= National Register of Historic Places listings in Sumner County, Kansas =

Location of Sumner County in Kansas

This is a list of the National Register of Historic Places listings in Sumner County, Kansas.

This is intended to be a complete list of the properties and districts on the National Register of Historic Places in Sumner County, Kansas, United States. The locations of National Register properties and districts for which the latitude and longitude coordinates are included below, may be seen in a map.

There are 10 properties and districts listed on the National Register in the county, and one former listing.

This National Park Service list is complete through NPS recent listings posted May 1, 2026.

== Current listings ==
| | Name on the Register | Image | Date listed | Location | City or town | Description |
|---|---|---|---|---|---|---|
| 1 | Bartlett Arboretum | Bartlett Arboretum | April 19, 2010 (#10000180) | Southwest corner of Highway 55 and Line St. 37°23′33″N 97°17′06″W | Belle Plaine | |
| 2 | Buresh Archeological Site | | May 14, 1971 (#71000333) | Address restricted | Caldwell | |
| 3 | Caldwell Carnegie Library | Caldwell Carnegie Library | February 24, 1983 (#83000443) | 13 N. Osage St. 37°01′58″N 97°36′34″W | Caldwell | |
| 4 | Downtown Wellington Historic District | | June 27, 2007 (#07000600) | Roughly bounded by 10th St., 4th St., Jefferson Ave., and the alley behind the Washington Ave. facing buildings 37°16′00″N 97°23′55″W | Wellington | |
| 5 | Old Oxford Mill | Old Oxford Mill | April 26, 1982 (#82002677) | Northeast of Oxford; 37°17′40″N 97°09′30″W | Oxford | |
| 6 | Salter House | Salter House | September 3, 1971 (#71000332) | 220 W. Garfield St. 37°15′53″N 97°46′00″W | Argonia | Home of first woman mayor in the United States, elected in 1887. |
| 7 | Edwin Smith House | Edwin Smith House | May 19, 2004 (#04000450) | 114 S. Jefferson; 37°15′54″N 97°23′58″W | Wellington | |
| 8 | H.F. Smith House | H.F. Smith House | April 18, 2007 (#07000318) | 721 W. Harvey Ave. 37°15′57″N 97°24′23″W | Wellington | |
| 9 | US Post Office-Caldwell | US Post Office-Caldwell | October 17, 1989 (#89001635) | 14 N. Main St. 37°01′58″N 97°36′31″W | Caldwell | |
| 10 | Wellington Carnegie Library | Wellington Carnegie Library | June 25, 1987 (#87000973) | 121 W. 7th 37°16′03″N 97°23′56″W | Wellington | |

== Former listings ==
| | Name on the Register | Image | Date listed | Date removed | Location | City or town | Description |
|---|---|---|---|---|---|---|---|
| 1 | Spring Creek School | | May 9, 1997 (#97000410) | January 13, 2017 | 4 miles north of U.S. Route 81, approximately 4 miles northeast of Caldwell; 37°06′56″N 97°37′01″W | Corbin | Delisted due to relocation on April 5, 2016 |

== See also ==
- List of National Historic Landmarks in Kansas
- National Register of Historic Places listings in Kansas
