= Same-sex marriage in Kansas =

Same-sex marriage became legal in Kansas following the U.S. Supreme Court's decision in Obergefell v. Hodges on June 26, 2015, which found the denial of marriage rights to same-sex couples unconstitutional. By June 30, all 31 judicial districts and all 105 Kansas counties were issuing marriage licenses to same-sex couples or had agreed to do so. Kansas state agencies initially delayed recognition of same-sex marriages for purposes including but not limited to changing names, ascribing health benefits and filing joint tax returns, but began doing so on July 6.

Kansas had previously defined marriage in its constitution as the "union of one man and one woman" and had by statute denied recognition to same-sex marriages from other jurisdictions. Before the Supreme Court resolved the issue, a series of lawsuits had challenged the state's policies with mixed success. In Marie v. Moser, U.S. District Judge Daniel D. Crabtree issued a preliminary injunction barring the Secretary of the Kansas Department of Health and Environment, Douglas County and Sedgwick County from enforcing Kansas' same-sex marriage ban on November 4, 2014. He temporarily stayed the injunction until November 11 to give state authorities time to appeal. On November 7, 2014, the Tenth Circuit Court of Appeals denied state officials' request for a stay pending appeal. On November 12, 2014, the U.S. Supreme Court denied the state officials' request for a stay pending the appeal of Marie. As the injunction in Marie was set to take effect, the Kansas Attorney General, Derek Schmidt, contended that Crabtree's preliminary injunction only applied to the two counties involved in the lawsuit, not statewide. The American Civil Liberties Union maintained that the injunction applied to all 105 of the state's counties. Some of the state district judges, who issue marriage licenses in Kansas, refused to authorize the issuing of marriage licenses to same-sex couples based on their own interpretation of the legal situation.

On November 18, 2014, the Kansas Supreme Court, acting in Schmidt v. Moriarty, allowed the licensing of same-sex marriages in the state's Tenth Judicial District, which covers Johnson County, to proceed. The court ruled that it was within the jurisdiction of Judge Kevin P. Moriarty, as chief judge of that district, to authorize the issuance of marriage licenses to same-sex couples based on his determination of the law. It left the issue of whether to license same-sex marriages to each judicial district.

== Legal restrictions ==
On April 4, 1996, the Kansas State Senate voted 39–1 in favor of a bill banning same-sex marriage and recognition of same-sex marriage performed out of state. The Kansas House of Representatives also passed the bill, and it was signed into law by Governor Bill Graves on April 11, 1996. A motion to pull legislation repealing the ban, introduced by representatives Brandon Woodard, Susan Ruiz and Heather Meyer in 2023, out of the Federal and State Affairs Committee and place it on the calendar for debate by the House failed in April 2024 by a 43–61 vote. The language banning same-sex marriage, while unenforceable, remains on the books.

On January 13, 2005, the State Senate voted 28–11 in favor of Kansas Amendment 1, a constitutional amendment banning same-sex marriage and the "rights or incidents of marriage". The House of Representatives voted 86–37 in favor of the amendment on February 2, 2005. On April 5, 2005, Kansas voters approved the amendment by a margin of more than 2 to 1. On January 26, 2017, Tom Witt, executive director of Equality Kansas, submitted bills to the Kansas Legislature to repeal the state's now-defunct constitutional ban on same-sex marriage and make appropriate changes in statutory law. The measures were unsuccessful.

== Lawsuits and recognition of some same-sex marriages ==
=== Nelson v. Kansas Department of Revenue ===
On December 30, 2013, private lawyers in Topeka filed a lawsuit in state court on behalf of two same-sex couples, Roberta and Julia Woodrick of Lawrence and Michael Nelson and Charles Dedmon of Alma, seeking recognition of their marriage licenses from other jurisdictions in order to be allowed to file joint state income tax returns. The lawsuit, Nelson v. Kansas Department of Revenue, stemmed from the June 2013 Supreme Court ruling in United States v. Windsor striking down part of the Defense of Marriage Act, after which the federal Internal Revenue Service began accepting joint income tax returns only if the couple's state of residence recognized the marriage. The plaintiffs' attorneys in Nelson argued that the Kansas Department of Revenue and the Kansas Constitution's definition of marriage made it impossible for the plaintiffs to file their state taxes honestly.

=== Tenth Circuit Court of Appeals precedent ===
The U.S. Supreme Court declined to hear two cases from the Tenth Circuit Court of Appeals on October 6, 2014, Kitchen v. Herbert and Bishop v. Smith. This left decisions that found Utah's and Oklahoma's bans on same-sex marriage unconstitutional as binding precedent on federal courts in Kansas. Legal experts expected Kansas to be required to allow same-sex marriage before long.

=== Schmidt v. Moriarty ===
On October 8, Judge Kevin P. Moriarty of the 10th Judicial District, covering Johnson County, the most populous in the state, directed the county clerk to issue marriage licenses to same-sex couples. A statement from Governor Sam Brownback said, "An overwhelming majority of Kansas voters amended the constitution to include a definition of marriage as one man and one woman. Activist judges should not overrule the people of Kansas." Kansas Attorney General Derek Schmidt said he was prepared for litigation and noted that the Kansas ban on same-sex marriage had not been invalidated in court. Schmidt filed a lawsuit in the Kansas Supreme Court, Schmidt v. Moriarty, asking the court to order Moriarty to stop issuing the licenses. Later that day, Kansas Chief Justice Lawton Nuss issued a temporary injunction suspending Moriarty's order authorizing the issuance of marriage licenses to same-sex couples "[i]n the interest of establishing statewide consistency" on the question of issuing licenses to same-sex couples, but the court allowed for the continued acceptance of applications for marriage licenses.

On November 13, following a federal court decision striking down the state's same-sex marriage ban in Marie v. Moser, Judge Moriarty asked the court to lift its temporary stay and allow him to issue licenses to same-sex couples. On November 18, the court ruled that Judge Moriarty was "within his jurisdiction" in ordering the issuance of marriage licenses to same-sex couples and lifted its stay, leaving other issues, including whether Moriarty's legal judgment was correct, to be resolved pending the final outcome of Marie.

=== Marie v. Moser ===
==== Proceedings and judgment ====
Once the decisions of the Tenth Circuit Court of Appeals in Kitchen v. Herbert and Bishop v. Smith became binding precedent on federal courts in Kansas, the American Civil Liberties Union (ACLU) filed a lawsuit, Marie v. Moser, in the U.S. District Court for the District of Kansas on October 10 on behalf of two lesbian couples who had been refused marriage licenses since the Supreme Court declined to review those decisions. The suit named as defendants Robert Moser, Secretary of the Kansas Department of Health and Environment (KDHE), and two district court clerks. Judge Daniel D. Crabtree heard oral arguments on October 31. On November 4, he ruled that "[b]ecause Kansas' constitution and statutes indeed do what Kitchen forbids, the Court concludes that Kansas' same-sex marriage ban violates the Fourteenth Amendment to the Constitution". He stayed enforcement of his ruling until 5 p.m. on November 11 unless the state defendants informed the court before then that they would not appeal the decision. The Tenth Circuit Court of Appeals rejected the state's request for a stay pending appeal. The Westboro Baptist Church sought to intervene in the suit without success. Anticipating the expiration of Judge Crabtree's temporary stay, Chief Judge Wayne Lampson of the 29th Judicial District, covering Wyandotte County, ordered his court's clerks to issue marriage licenses to same-sex couples beginning on November 12. The state defendants asked Supreme Court Justice Sonia Sotomayor, as Circuit Justice for the Tenth Circuit, to issue a stay pending appeal, and on November 10 she granted a temporary stay pending consideration of their request. In their briefs, the parties disputed the significance of the order issued by the Kansas Supreme Court in Schmidt v. Moriarty and of the recent decision of the Sixth Circuit Court of Appeals in DeBoer v. Snyder. The Supreme Court denied the state's request for a stay on November 12, 2014, allowing the district court order to take effect. Attorney General Schmidt said that order only applied to Douglas and Sedgwick counties.

On November 26, the plaintiffs amended their complaint to include three additional couples as plaintiffs and three additional defendants: the Secretary of the Kansas Department of Revenue, the Director of the Division of Vehicles, and the Director of the State Employee Health Plan. On December 2, the Tenth Circuit denied the state's request for an initial hearing en banc of their appeal. On December 8, the plaintiffs asked the court to extend its order to cover the three additional defendants and "any officers, agents, servants, employees, attorneys, other persons who are in active concert or participation with them". On December 10, the three original named defendants asked the district court to remove them as defendants. Moser wrote that he had resigned on November 30 after complying with the court's order, though stayed, by modifying the state's marriage license forms to accommodate same-sex couples, leaving no further action to be compelled from his successor. He and the two clerks noted that the plaintiffs had not married even though they were able to do so and that the plaintiffs had no ongoing dispute with the clerks and therefore no longer had standing. The plaintiffs' briefs in reply noted that Moser was named in his official capacity and is therefore succeeded as the principal named defendant by Susan Mosier, Interim Secretary of the KDHE. They noted that the duties of that office extend beyond providing marriage license forms and include "supervising the registration of all marriages" and related activities. They argued that the clerks' compliance with a preliminary injunction does not moot the case and that the "plaintiffs are entirely within their rights in adjusting the timing of their marriage so that their claims do not become moot before final judgment is entered."

Despite the replacement of Moser as Secretary of the KDHE by Mosier, the case remained Marie v. Moser. The new state defendants filed a motion to dismiss on January 20, 2015. Unlike most state officials' briefs, it cited section 2 of the Defense of Marriage Act to defend the state's refusal to recognize same-sex marriages from other jurisdictions. On March 17, Judge Crabtree rejected the defendants' motions to suspend proceedings pending action in similar cases by the U.S. Supreme Court. He gave them until April 13 to respond to the plaintiffs' motion for summary judgment. On August 10, 2015, Judge Crabtree issued an order declaring that "Article 15, § 16 of the Kansas Constitution, ... and any other Kansas statute, law, policy, or practice that prohibits issuing marriage licenses to same-sex couples in Kansas or recognizing such marriages on the same terms and conditions that apply to opposite-sex couples contravene the Fourteenth Amendment to the United States Constitution."

==== State agency response ====
As of November 19, 2014, state executive agencies such as the Division of Vehicles continued to deny recognition to same-sex marriages. Governor Brownback's office said policies would not change as long as the state was appealing the ruling in Marie, citing income tax filing as an example. A spokesperson for Governor Brownback said state agencies would "take the necessary legal actions once this issue is resolved." The Department of Health and Environment, on the other hand, under the U.S. district court's order not to enforce the state's ban, modified its marriage license application forms to accommodate same-sex couples.

==== Marriage licenses issued ====
One same-sex couple married in Kansas in the week following the U.S. Supreme Court's refusal to hear appeals in Kitchen and Bishop on October 6, 2014. The couple applied for a marriage license on October 7, a day when most county clerks were waiting for instructions, and submitted it to their district court the next day. Following the state's 3-day waiting period, they received their license on October 10 and held their wedding service at the Johnson County Courthouse just a few hours before the Kansas Supreme Court issued an injunction in Schmidt v. Moriarty to halt the issuance of marriage licenses to same-sex couples there.

Several Kansas counties began issuing marriage licenses to same-sex couples for the first time on November 13, 2014, though Attorney General Schmidt contended that the federal court order in Marie v. Moser only applied to two counties. The head of the LGBT advocacy group Equality Kansas said it was unclear whether all counties were required to issue such licenses, while the ACLU said "[t]he ruling was clear" and applied to all counties. Johnson County remained under a state court's temporary order not to issue such licenses. More counties began issuing licenses on November 17, even while the Kansas Supreme Court was deliberating whether district judges had the authority to authorize them. The National Organization for Marriage (NOM) urged Governor Brownback to "order local clerks to refuse to issue marriage licenses that violate Kansas law defining marriage as the union of one man and one woman." Its president, Brian Brown, said: "The question for the people of Kansas, and indeed the nation, is whether we are going to allow an illegitimate order by federal judges to trump state law and the vote of 70% of the Kansas electorate. Fifty million Americans in over thirty states have voted in support of traditional marriage and it's time that states fight back to protect the decision of those voters."

Following the Kansas Supreme Court ruling in Schmidt v. Moriarty, Equality Kansas confirmed that 19 counties were issuing licenses to same-sex couples: Brown, Chase, Cherokee, Cloud, Cowley, Crawford, Douglas, Jewell, Johnson, Labette, Lincoln, Lyon, Mitchell, Republic, Riley, Sedgwick, Shawnee, Washington and Wyandotte. On November 20, Judge Richard Walker, chief of the state's 9th Judicial District, said his district had begun issuing as well. Administrative directives existed in the 8th and 19th districts to issue as well. Judge Ed Bouker, chief of the state's 23rd Judicial District, also mentioned he would issue licenses although "...no one has [yet] filled out an application." This added the following counties to those issuing licenses: Dickinson, Ellis, Geary, Gove, Harvey, Marion, McPherson, Morris, Rooks and Trego. A November 24 update by Equality Kansas added the following counties, not listed previously, as issuing licenses: Doniphan, Marshall, and Nemaha. The following day, Equality Kansas confirmed the state's 31st Judicial District was issuing licenses, adding Allen, Neosho, Wilson, and Woodson. As of December 16, Equality Kansas reported another 7 counties were issuing such licenses: Clark, Clay, Comanche, Ford, Gray, Kiowa, and Meade. The six counties in the 26th Judicial District began issuing licenses during the week of December 22: Grant, Haskell, Morton, Seward, Stanton, and Stevens. Altogether, these 54 counties included 76% of the state's population. The 1st Judicial District, which includes Atchison and Leavenworth counties, approved issuing licenses, as did the 6th Judicial District, comprising Miami, Linn, and Bourbon counties, in January 2015. The 28th Judicial District, which includes Ottawa and Saline counties, began issuing licenses in February. On June 26, the 27th Judicial District which includes Reno agreed to start issuing marriages licenses, bringing the total population living in counties that issued same-sex marriage licenses to 86%.

The state's 4th Judicial District had announced that it "[would] have to wait for another court ruling before it will begin issuing licenses" after the ruling in Moriarty. Counties affected under this decision were: Anderson, Coffey, Franklin, and Osage. Judge David Ricke of the state's 13th Judicial District indicated that the ban would remain there as well, affecting Butler, Elk and Greenwood counties. Twelve more counties reported as denying marriage licenses to same-sex couples were: Cheyenne, Jackson, Jefferson, Logan, Pottawatomie, Rawlins, Sheridan, Sherman, Thomas, Wabaunsee, and Wallace. As of February 9, most of the remaining counties had announced that they would also refuse to issue licenses. These 38 counties comprised 12% of the state's population.

Eventually, after the Supreme Court's ruling in Obergefell, all 105 counties agreed to issue marriage licenses to same-sex couples.

== U.S. Supreme Court ruling ==
=== Judgment and reactions ===
Following the decision of the U.S. Supreme Court in Obergefell v. Hodges on June 26, 2015, which ruled that the denial of marriage rights to same-sex couples violates the Due Process and Equal Protection clauses of the Fourteenth Amendment, the number of judicial districts issuing marriage licenses to same-sex couples increased steadily. By the afternoon of June 30, all judicial districts had agreed to issue marriage licenses to same-sex couples, though some had yet to receive an application from a same-sex couple. On both July 9 and 14, 2015, state attorneys announced that the state was now fully recognising the marriages of same-sex couples for state benefits, taxation and other purposes.

On June 26, Governor Brownback decried the Obergefell ruling, saying in a statement, "Activist courts should not overrule the people of this state, who have clearly supported the Kansas Constitution's definition of marriage as being between one man and one woman". He later said the state would study the decision. A spokesperson said, "Our office is fully reviewing and analyzing the ruling in order to understand the implications and policy changes in order to follow and comply with the law". On July 7, 2015, Brownback issued an executive order to prohibit "state government from taking any discriminatory action against any 'individual clergy or religious leader,' or any 'religious organization' that chooses not to participate in a marriage that is inconsistent with its sincerely held religious belief or moral conviction that marriage is or should be recognized as the union of one man and one woman."

It remained unclear whether or when state agencies would begin complying with the Supreme Court ruling for such purposes as filing joint tax returns and providing spousal health care benefits, including the state's Medicaid program, with respect to same-sex couples married in Kansas or in other jurisdictions. Without making an official announcement, some state agencies began doing so on July 6, and July 7, although details of the state's implementation remained unclear as officials made contradictory statements about the state's policy change. On July 9, 2015, it was discovered that state agencies were recognizing same-sex marriages. Attorneys for the state filed a motion in federal court to dismiss a lawsuit against state agencies for not recognizing same-sex marriages, contending that agencies were now treating same-sex couples the same as heterosexual couples, eliminating the need for litigation. The state acknowledged in the brief that "driver license applications are being handled in the same manner for all married couples whatever the gender of the parties... and Kansas income tax returns filed jointly are now being accepted for all married couples." A spokesperson for Governor Brownback's office announced on July 14 that married same-sex couples would be able to file joint tax returns for the 2014 tax year.

=== Continuing litigation ===
On August 10, 2015, Judge Crabtree granted the plaintiffs in Marie v. Moser the specific relief they sought, but deferred judgment on their request for an injunction prohibiting enforcement of Kansas' denial of marriage rights to same-sex couples.

On July 22, 2016, Judge Crabtree issued a final ruling in Marie. He denied the state's motion that the case was moot in light of Obergefell given the failure of state officials to comply with that U.S. Supreme Court ruling consistently. He issued a permanent injunction against the enforcement of Kansas' denial of marriage rights to same-sex couples. He indicated that the court would maintain supervisory oversight for three years, allowing anyone who believed a state official was not complying with the injunction to address their complaint to his court rather than file a new lawsuit.

=== Developments after legalization ===
In February 2019, seven Republican lawmakers introduced the so-called Marriage and Constitution Restoration Act to the Kansas Legislature. (Note: The seven lawmakers were Randy Garber, Owen Donohoe, David French, Cheryl Helmer, Ron Highland, Steve Huebert, and Bill Rhiley.) The bill sought to define same-sex marriages as "parody marriages", forbid the state from recognizing such marriages, and establish an "elevated marriage" option for different-sex couples who seek "higher standards of commitment". The Wichita Eagle reported that the legislation stood very little chance of advancing. Indeed, the bill died at the end of the legislative session on May 29, 2019. One of the bill's sponsors, Representative Ron Highland, later asked to be removed as a sponsor of the legislation. His daughter, who described herself as a "proud member of the LGBTQ+ community in Kansas City", publicly condemned her father's decision to support the bill.

== Native American nations ==
The Law and Order Code of the Prairie Band Potawatomi Nation does not expressly forbid same-sex marriages. It states that "all marriages and divorces where an Indian person is a party, whether consummated in accordance with the State law or in accordance with Tribal law or custom, may be recorded in Tribal Court." As a result, same-sex marriages validly performed in another jurisdiction, including in the state of Kansas, are legally recognized on the reservation. Similar language is found in the tribal codes of the Kickapoo Tribe of Kansas, and the Sac and Fox Nation of Missouri in Kansas and Nebraska. It is unclear if same-sex marriages are recognized on the reservation of the Iowa Tribe of Kansas and Nebraska as tribal officials have not publicly commented on the issue.

While there are no records of same-sex marriages as understood from a Western perspective being performed in Native American cultures, there is evidence for identities and behaviours that may be placed on the LGBT spectrum. Many of these cultures recognized two-spirit individuals who were born male but wore women's clothing and performed everyday household work and artistic handiwork which were regarded as belonging to the feminine sphere. In the Chiwere language, two-spirit people are called mihxóge (pronounced [mihxoꜜgɛ]). "The mihxóge were respectfully treated as a special class of religious leaders. Among the late Baxoje, Jiwére-Ñút'achi elders, the mihxóge were still regarded with awe for their spiritual connection and consecrated role in harmony with the Holy Grandfather spirits. [...] They're half man, half woman. And they don't have (heterosexual) relationship(s). They do something (to fulfill needs) among themselves. [...] They're not crazy. They just got that born in them. Born in their nature." Two-spirit people had "visions of female deities or the Moon that served to endorse their identity". Sauk two-spirit individuals, known as nîshwi manetôwaki, also characterized their gender role change as "an unfortunate destiny which they cannot avoid, being supposed to be impelled to this course by a vision from the female spirit that resides in the Moon." They were sacred and honored annually with a dance in which only those men who had had sexual intercourse with a nîshwi manetôwaki were allowed to participate. The Potawatomi mnedokwé (pronounced [mnədoˈkʷɛ], plural: mnedokwék) were regarded as "esteemed persons with special spiritual powers". They "sought out female company" from an early age, possessed the "work skills" of both sexes and "talked like women". Ruth Landes reported in 1970 that they were "said to possess visions…but not to practice sorcery. [Mnedokwék] exemplified a distinct category of 'power'."

== Economic impact ==
According to a study conducted by the Williams Institute in 2015, Kansas would see more than 2,000 same-sex marriages in the following three years, which would add $14.1 million to the state's economy.

== Demographics and marriage statistics ==
Data from the 2000 U.S. census showed that 3,973 same-sex couples were living in Kansas. By 2005, this had increased to 6,663 couples, likely attributed to same-sex couples' growing willingness to disclose their partnerships on government surveys. Same-sex couples lived in all counties of the state and constituted 0.7% of coupled households and 0.4% of all households in the state. Most couples lived in Sedgwick, Johnson and Wyandotte counties, but the counties with the highest percentage of same-sex couples were Kearny (0.71% of all county households) and Jackson (0.68%). Same-sex partners in Kansas were on average younger than opposite-sex partners, and more likely to be employed. However, the average and median household incomes of same-sex couples were lower than different-sex couples, and same-sex couples were also far less likely to own a home than opposite-sex partners. 17% of same-sex couples in Kansas were raising children under the age of 18, with an estimated 1,797 children living in households headed by same-sex couples in 2005.

The 2020 U.S. census showed that there were 3,885 married same-sex couple households (1,547 male couples and 2,338 female couples) and 3,527 unmarried same-sex couple households in Kansas.

== Domestic partnerships ==
On May 22, 2007, the City Commission of Lawrence voted 4–1 in favor of the creation of a domestic partnership registry. The ordinance went into effect on August 1, 2007. A similar ordinance was enacted in Topeka on May 20, 2014, passing by a vote of 5–3. It went into effect on June 30, 2014.

== Public opinion ==
Public opinion for same-sex marriage in Kansas
Poll source	Dates administered	Sample size	Margin of error	Support	Opposition	Do not know / refused
Public Religion Research Institute	March 9 – December 7, 2023	187 adults	?	65%	33%	2%
Public Religion Research Institute	March 11 – December 14, 2022	?	?	69%	30%	1%
Public Religion Research Institute	March 8 – November 9, 2021	?	?	58%	39%	3%
Public Religion Research Institute	January 7 – December 20, 2020	425 adults	?	48%	44%	8%
Public Religion Research Institute	April 5 – December 23, 2017	686 adults	?	57%	37%	6%
Public Religion Research Institute	May 18, 2016 – January 10, 2017	1,091 adults	?	61%	32%	7%
Public Religion Research Institute	April 29, 2015 – January 7, 2016	876 adults	?	53%	38%	9%
Public Religion Research Institute	April 2, 2014 – January 4, 2015	568 adults	?	50%	43%	7%
Public Policy Polling	October 9–12, 2014	1,081 likely voters	± 3.0%	44%	49%	7%
New York Times/CBS News/YouGov	September 20 – October 1, 2014	2,013 likely voters	± 2.6%	44%	41%	15%
Public Policy Polling	February 18–20, 2014	693 voters	± 3.7%	44%	48%	8%
Public Policy Polling	February 21–24, 2013	1,229 registered voters	± 2.8%	39%	51%	10%

== See also ==
- LGBT rights in Kansas
- Status of same-sex marriage
- Timeline of same-sex marriage
- Same-sex marriage in the United States
