= Adamsville, Kansas =

Unincorporated community in Sumner County, Kansas

Coordinates: 37°10′24″N 97°10′35″W

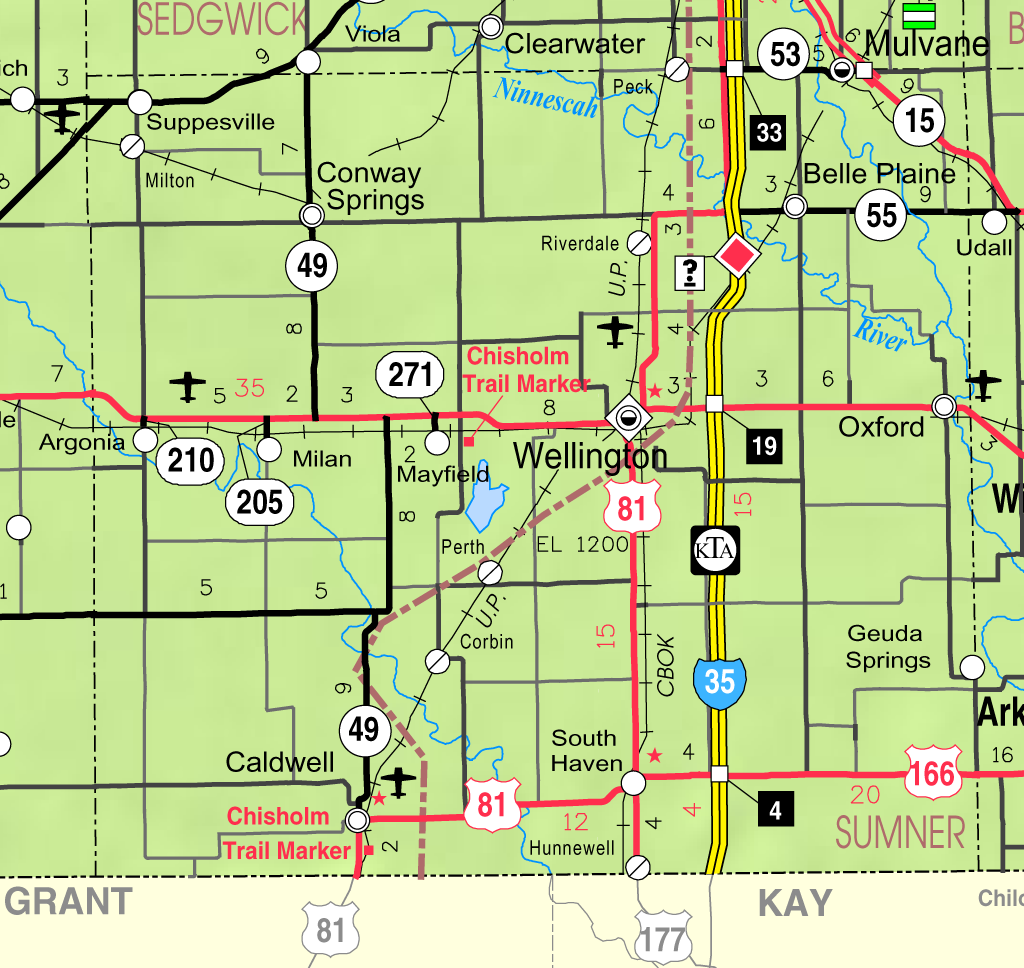
KDOT map of Sumner County (legend)

Adamsville is an unincorporated community in Sumner County, Kansas, United States. It is located approximately four miles north of Geuda Springs, at 0.5 mile west of the intersection of S Oxford Rd and E 80th St, adjacent to an abandoned railroad.

== History ==
A post office was opened in Adamsville in 1925, and remained in operation until it was discontinued in 1931.

A railroad previously passed through the community, north to south, from Oxford to Geuda Springs.

== Education ==
The community is served by Oxford USD 358 public school district.
