= Dalton, Kansas =

Unincorporated community in Sumner County, Kansas

- Unincorporated community
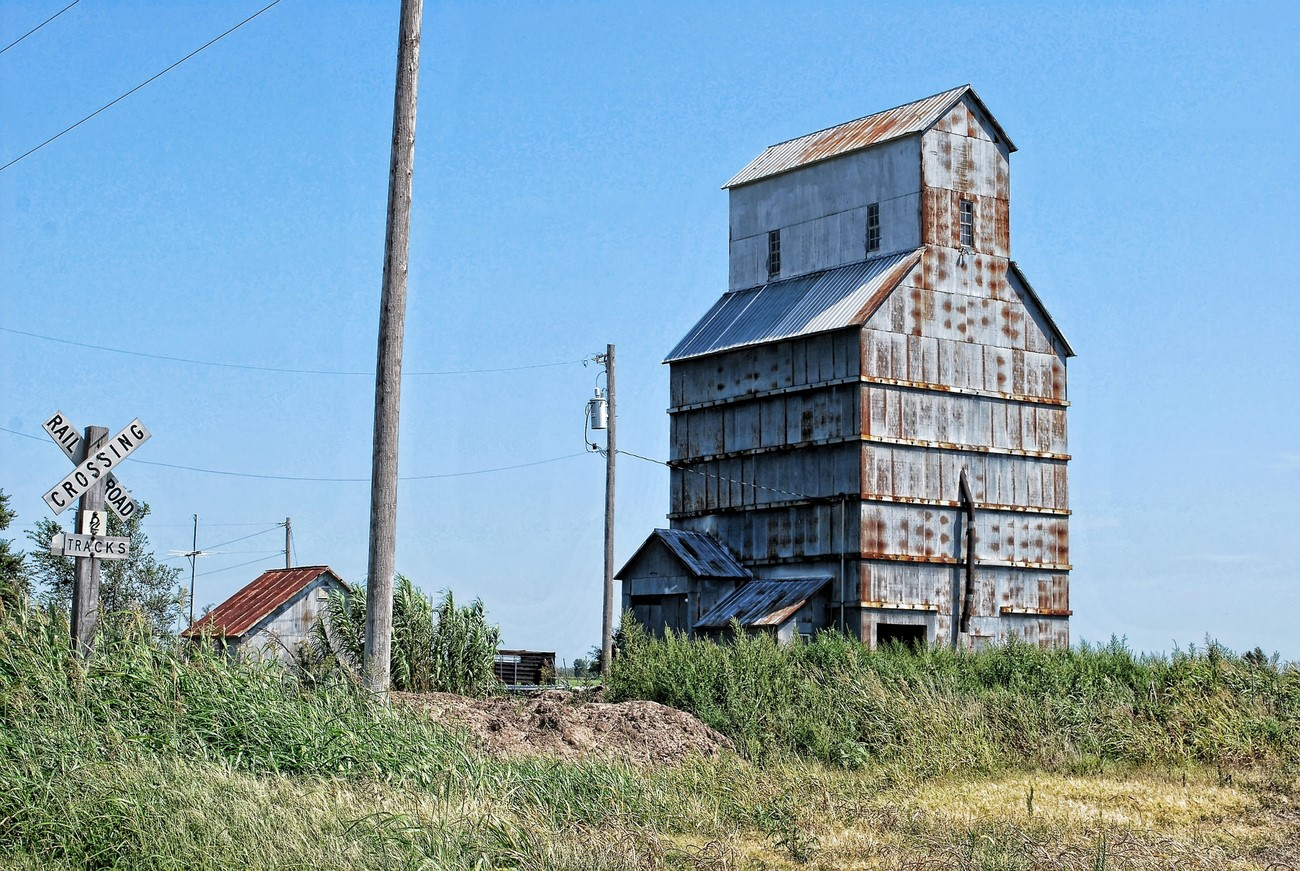
- Grain Elevator in Dalton (2009)

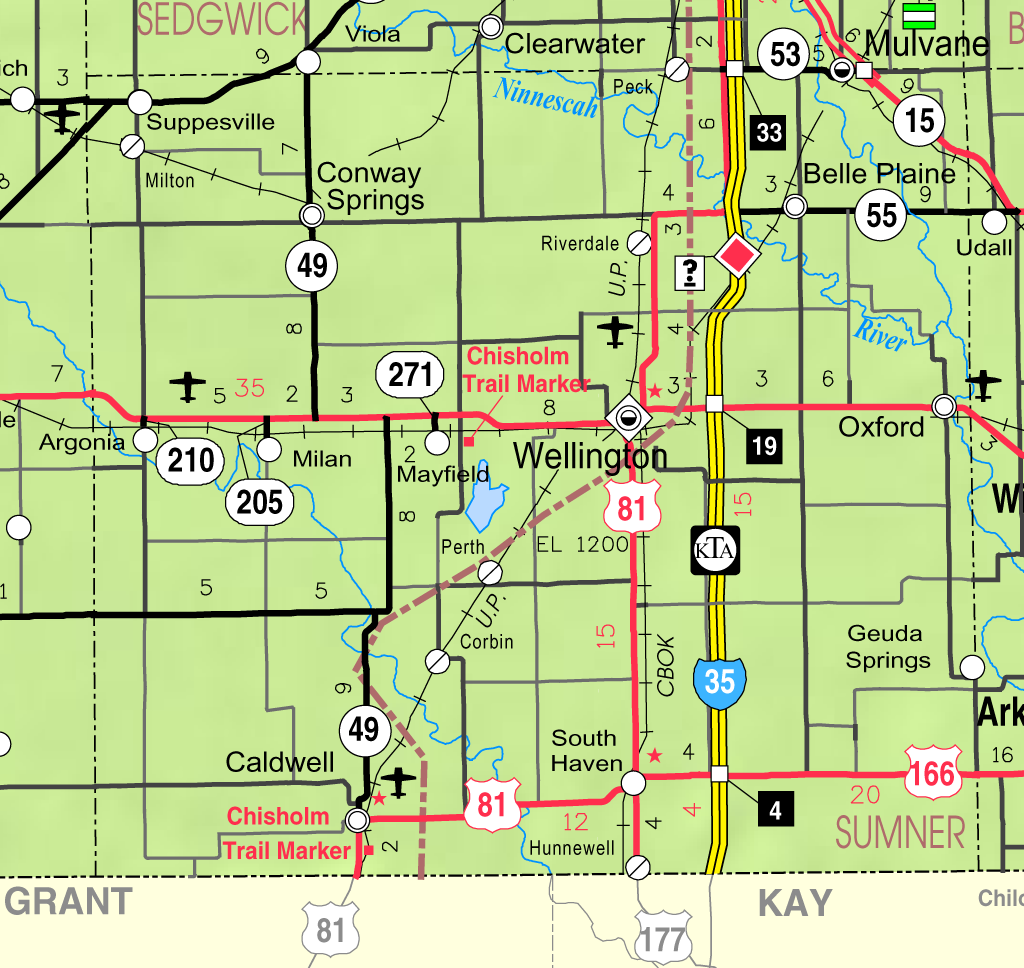
- KDOT map of Sumner County (legend)

- Location within Kansas Location within the United States
- Coordinates: 37°16′9″N 97°16′21″W
- Country: United States
- State: Kansas
- County: Sumner
- Elevation: 1,207 ft (368 m)
- Time zone: UTC-6 (CST)
  - Summer (DST): UTC-5 (CDT)
- Area code: 620
- FIPS code: 20-16950
- GNIS ID: 484503

Dalton is an unincorporated community in Avon Township, Sumner County, Kansas, United States. It is located about halfway between Wellington and Oxford at the intersection of S Oliver Rd and E 15th St S, next to an abandoned railroad.

== History ==
Dalton was a station on the Atchison, Topeka and Santa Fe Railway that previously passed through the community, east to west, from Oxford to Wellington.

A post office was opened in Dalton in 1885, and remained in operation until it was discontinued in 1939.

== Education ==
The community is served by Oxford USD 358 public school district.
