= Bartlett Arboretum =

Bartlett Arboretum may refer to:

- Bartlett Arboretum and Gardens, in Stamford, Connecticut, United States
- Bartlett Arboretum (Kansas), in Belle Plaine, Kansas, United States
