= Otto B. Wenrich =

American politician (1883–1959)

Otto B. Wenrich (1883 – January 28, 1959) was a politician in Kansas who served as mayor of Oxford, Kansas and as a state legislator. A Republican, he served as mayor of Oxford, Kansas. He represented the 26th District in the Kansas Senate from 1941 to 1943. He served on Oxford's city council.

In 1944 he lost his reelection campaign to Democrat John Potucek.
