= John Potucek =

John Potucek may refer to:

- John Potucek (Kansas politician)
- John Potucek (New Hampshire politician)
