= KEGT =

KEGT may refer to:

- Wellington Municipal Airport (ICAO code KEGT)
- KEGT (FM), a radio station (106.5 FM) licensed to serve San Miguel, California, United States; see List of radio stations in California
