= Ed Trimmer =

American politician

Member of the Kansas House of Representatives from the 79th district
- In office January 14, 2013 – January 14, 2019
- Preceded by: Kasha Kelley
- Succeeded by: Cheryl Helmer

Member of the Kansas House of Representatives from the 78th district
- In office August 9, 2005 – January 14, 2013
- Preceded by: Judy Showalter
- Succeeded by: Ron Ryckman Jr.

Personal details
- Born: January 12, 1952 (age 74)
- Party: Democratic
- Spouse: Krystal
- Children: 2
- Education: Emporia State University

Ed Trimmer (born January 12, 1952) was a Democratic member of the Kansas House of Representatives, representing the 79th district and had been the minority whip. He served from August 19, 2005 until January 14, 2019.

Trimmer was defeated for reelection by Republican Cheryl Helmer, who received 3,683 votes, 50.8% of the total ballots cast, to Trimmer's 3,570 votes 49.2% of the total.

In 2019, Trimmer was elected to the Winfield Board of Education, receiving the highest total of the four seated candidates who were running for four-year terms.

Trimmer taught in Winfield Public Schools from 1974–2006.

He has served on a number of organizations including Mosaic Patient Review Committee, ABCDE, National Forensic League, Vision 20/20 People Sub-committee, and the Kansas Speech Communication Association.

== Committee membership ==
- Education
- Health and Human Services
- Government Efficiency and Fiscal Oversight (Ranking Member)
- Joint Committee on Administrative Rules and Regulations

== Major Donors ==
The top 5 donors to Trimmer's 2008 campaign were all professional organizations:

- 1. Kansas Medical Society $1,000
- 2. Kansas Contractors Assoc $1,000
- 3. Kansas National Education Assoc $1,000
- 4. Kansas Assoc of Realtors $900
- 5. Kansas Optometric Assoc $750
