= Henry P. Larrabee =

Henry P. Larrabee (c. 1830 – December 19, 1906), also known as Hank Larrabee, was a 49er, and rancher in the Eel River Valley of Humboldt County, California. In this region, he was notorious for his treatment of Native American people. Subsequently, he was a sheriff in Montana, a family man, businessman and school board member in Kansas.

== History ==
He was born in Marion County, Ohio, son of Joseph and Lucy Larrabee, and lived there until leaving for California during the 1849 California Gold Rush. He established a ranch at "Larrabee" in Humboldt County in 1859. He also owned the land around Blocksburg from the Eel River to Larabee Valley to the east. The town of Blocksburg was originally called "Larabee" or its other spelling "Laribee" Several landmarks–including Larabee Creek, Little Larabee Creek, and Larabee Valley-are named for him, although old maps and writings occasionally use the alternate spelling "Laribee."

He was a reputed killer of Native Americans, having once bragged that he killed more than 60 Indian children with a hatchet, and served as a corporal in the Volunteer Guides during the Bald Hills War. He is widely believed to have been an instigator and among the killers in the Indian Island massacre.

United States Army Lieutenant Daniel Lynn, sent to Larrabee Valley with a detachment in March 1861, described Larrabee to his superior, Captain Charles Lovell:

"Here in this apparently lovely valley lived a man about whose qualities I feel myself impelled to speak. I heard no man speak in his favor, nor even intimate one redeeming trait in his character. The universal cry was against him. At the Thousand Acre Field and Iaqua Ranch even the woman who was shot and burned to death was condemned for living with such a man. Of most enormities of which he stands accused you are aware. An accomplice and actor in the massacre at Indian Island and South Bay; the murderer of Yo-keel-la-bah; recently engaged in killing unoffending Indians, his party, according to their own story, having killed eighteen at one time (eight bucks and ten squaws and children), and now at work imbruing his hands in the blood of slaughtered innocence. I do not think Mr. Larrabee can be too emphatically condemned."

An anonymous letter writer called attention to some of the abuses: "Larrabee, for his part, took offense at an Indian boy who worked for him but who would periodically run off to visit his relatives. Larrabee 'went down one morning and slaughtered the whole family of about six persons, boy and all. He then made a rude raft of logs, put the victims on it… and started the bodies down the river.'"

Leaving Humboldt County, Larrabee followed another gold rush to the Salmon River in 1862, ending up in Hellgate, Montana, where he was elected sheriff of Missoula County under the name "Henry P. Larrabie" in 1865, serving only about one year. Larrabee left Missoula in 1868 to return to Ohio at about the time his father died.

Larrabee married Catherine Linn Phillips (1849-1940) on February 14, 1869, in Indiana, with whom he had five children and moved from Indiana to Joplin, Missouri, then to Wellington, Kansas, and finally to Wichita, Kansas, where he ran an artificial stone business. Later he was a homesteader, cattle rancher, deputy sheriff and on the school board in Liberal, Seward County, Kansas, until he died on December 17, 1906, of cancer under the name "Henry Pierre Larrabee."

== See also ==
- 1860 Wiyot massacre
- Bald Hills War
