= J. C. Long =

American politician

J.C. Long

Member of the Kansas House of Representatives from the 105th district
- In office January 14, 1991 – January 11, 1993
- Preceded by: Leroy F. Fry
- Succeeded by: Richard Alldritt

Member of the Kansas House of Representatives from the 100th district
- In office January 10, 1983 – January 14, 1991
- Preceded by: Victor Elliott
- Succeeded by: Jack Sluiter

Personal details
- Born: May 6, 1959 (age 67) Wellington, Kansas, U.S.
- Party: Republican
- Education: University of Kansas

J.C. Long (May 6, 1959) is an American former politician who was a Republican member of the Kansas House of Representatives from Harper, representing the 100th district from 1983–1991 and the 105th district from 1991–1993.
