= Oxford USD 358 =

Public school district in Oxford, Kansas

Address
- 515 N. Water St. Oxford, Kansas, 67119; United States
- Coordinates: 37°16′45″N 97°9′56″W

District information
- Type: Public
- Grades: K to 12
- Schools: 2

Other information
- Website: usd358.com

Oxford USD 358 is a public unified school district headquartered in Oxford, Kansas, United States. The district includes the communities of Oxford, Geuda Springs, Adamsville, Dalton, Kellogg, and nearby rural areas.

== Schools ==
The school district operates the following schools:

- Oxford Jr/Sr High School
- Oxford Elementary School

== Sports ==
The school district supports a number of boys' and girls' sports. Oxford participates in the South Central Border League.

Boys' sports: baseball, basketball, football, track and field, wrestling

Girls' sports: basketball, cheerleading, track and field, volleyball

== See also ==
- List of high schools in Kansas
- List of unified school districts in Kansas
- Kansas State Department of Education
- Kansas State High School Activities Association
