= Kasha Kelley =

American politician (born 1969)

Member of the Kansas House of Representatives from the 80th district
- In office January 14, 2013 – January 9, 2017
- Preceded by: Vincent Wetta
- Succeeded by: Anita Judd-Jenkins

Member of the Kansas House of Representatives from the 79th district
- In office January 10, 2005 – January 14, 2013
- Preceded by: Joseph Shriver
- Succeeded by: Ed Trimmer

Personal details
- Born: October 5, 1969 (age 56)
- Party: Republican
- Education: University of Kansas

Kasha Kelley (October 5, 1969) was a Republican member of the Kansas House of Representatives, representing the 80th district. She had served since 2005. She lost her primary in 2016. The American Conservative Union gave her a 91% evaluation. Kelley, who received her BS in Broadcast Journalism from the University of Kansas, is CEO of the Customer Retention Company and of First Intermark Corporation.

== Committee membership ==
- Taxation
- Energy and Environment
- Education
- Appropriations
- Commerce
