= Anita Judd-Jenkins =

American politician

Member of the Kansas House of Representatives from the 80th district
- In office January 9, 2017 – January 14, 2019
- Preceded by: Kasha Kelley
- Succeeded by: Bill Rhiley

Personal details
- Party: Republican

Anita Judd-Jenkins is an American politician. She served as a member of the Kansas House of Representatives for the 80th district from 2017 to 2019.

== Early life ==
Judd-Jenkins graduated from Northeast Missouri State University (now Truman State University). She worked in sales and marketing before joining politics. She is married to Ronnie D. Jenkins and they have one son.

== Political career ==
Judd-Jenkins was first elected to the Kansas House of Representatives for the 80th district in the 2016 state legislative elections. She defeated representative Kasha Kelley in the Republican primary with 52.7% of the vote and she won the general election against Democrat Michelle Schiltz with 68.7% of the vote. Judd-Jenkins described herself as a "fiscally conservative, moderate Republican", who won the election with aims of expanding Medicaid and solving the state's financial issues. She was appointed to the general government budget committee, the children and seniors committee and the social services budget committee.

In June 2017, she joined a group of seven House Republicans who voted to override Governor Sam Brownback's veto of SB 30, passing into law a repeal of the governor's 2012 tax policy. She was unseated by Bill Rhiley in the 2018 Republican primary, receiving 41.9% of the vote.
