= Vincent Wetta =

American politician (born 1945)

Member of the Kansas House of Representatives from the 80th district
- In office January 8, 2007 – January 14, 2013
- Preceded by: Bill McCreary
- Succeeded by: Kasha Kelley

Personal details
- Born: December 5, 1945 (age 80) Wichita, Kansas, U.S.
- Party: Democratic
- Spouse: Marilyn
- Children: 3
- Education: Wichita State University (BA)

Vincent Wetta (born December 5, 1945) was a Democratic member of the Kansas House of Representatives, representing the 80th district (Sumner County), from 2007 to 2013.

== Early life and education ==
Wetta was born in Wichita and lived in Wellington, where he worked as a conductor/engineer with the Burlington Northern-Santa Fe Railway Company from 1966 to 2006. He graduated from Wichita State University with a BA in political science in 1996.

== Career ==
Wetta has been president and on the board of directors of the Panhandle Federal Credit Union, as well as being a member of the Crusader Club, Knights of Columbus and Wellington Rotary Club.

=== Committee membership ===
- Energy and Utilities
- Transportation
- Agriculture and Natural Resources

=== Major donors ===
The top five donors to Wetta's 2008 campaign:

- 1. Kimball Insurance Agency Inc: $1,000
- 2. Kansas Contractors Assoc: $600
- 3. Kansas Medical Society: $500
- 4. Shank, Hank, Heather & Scott: $500
- 5. McAlister, Tom: $500

== Personal life ==
He is married to Marilyn with three children.
