= Minnie Minnich =

American politician

Member of the Kansas House of Representatives from the 69th district
- In office January 10, 1921 – January 8, 1923
- Preceded by: Lafayette Finney
- Succeeded by: Joe Erwin

Personal details
- Born: January 26, 1889
- Died: February 28, 1941 (aged 52) Wichita, Kansas, U.S.
- Party: Republican

Minnie Minnich (January 26, 1889 – February 28, 1941) was an American politician who served one term in the Kansas House of Representatives representing the 69th District in Sumner County, Kansas. A social worker and resident of Wellington, Kansas, she was elected in 1920 as part of the second group of women elected to the Kansas Legislature, serving with Rep. Minnie J. Grinstead, Rep. Nellie Cline and Rep. Ida Walker.

1921-1922 Kansas House of Representatives Committee Assignments

- Agriculture
- Cities of the Second Class
- Employees
- Public Utilities
- State Institutions
