= Zeta V. Wood =

American singer

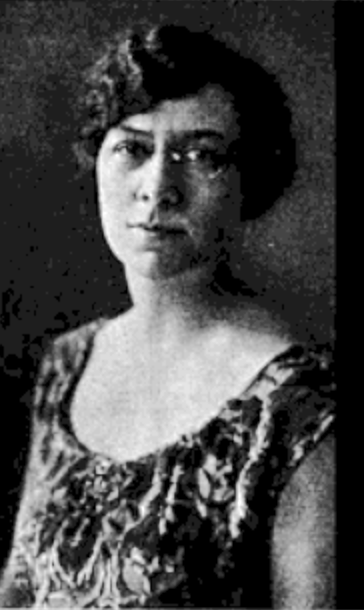
- Zeta V. Wood, from a 1926 publication
- Born: Zeta A. Van Gundy; July 22, 1892; Evanston, Illinois, U.S.
- Died: September 2, 1973 (aged 81); Santa Barbara, California, U.S.
- Occupations: Singer, voice teacher, lecturer

Zeta A. Van Gundy Wood (July 22, 1892 – September 2, 1973) was an American singer, lecturer, music director, and voice teacher. She taught and led vocal music ensembles in New York City in the 1920s, and in San Francisco in the 1940s.

== Early life and education ==
Wood was born in Evanston, Illinois, and raised in Wellington, Kansas, the daughter of William Austin Van Gundy and Elizabeth Ellen Kirkpatrick Van Gundy. Her father was a minister. She graduated from the Wichita College of Music in 1913, with further studies at the Northwestern University School of Music and in New York.

== Career ==
Wood taught music in Kansas schools before she married. She sang at a Red Cross benefit concert in Kansas in 1918. She organized the Zeta V. Wood School for Singers in New York, and directed the Manhattan Double Quartette, an all-women vocal ensemble. She was also the soloist at a 1926 concert of the double quartet at Aeolian Hall. In 1927 she conducted a Christmas musicale for radio station WNYC. She gave a recital at Steinway Hall in 1928. In 1929 she directed the Manhattan Ladies' Chorus in a concert at Steinway Hall.

In the 1930s she worked and performed in Kansas and Arkansas and lectured on music and voice techniques. In 1938 she taught at the University of Panama for a year. She moved to San Francisco in 1941, where she was music director at a Congregational church, and directed the San Francisco Schola Cantorum, a music school. She moved to Santa Barbara in 1952, and continued teaching and lecturing there in her later years. In the 1950s her interests turned to "personality building", and many of her classes were on that subject.

== Publications ==
- Tone Production (1929)

== Personal life ==
She married William H. Wood in 1917. He died in 1946. She remarried in 1952, to John Monforte Wilson, her sister's widower. He died in 1962. She died in 1973, at the age of 81, in Santa Barbara.
