= Ida Walker =

American politician

Ida Walker (February 22, 1876 - June 18, 1968) was an American politician, educator and journalist who served two terms as a member of the Kansas House of Representatives as the representative of the 101st District in Norton County, Kansas. A Republican, she was one of the first four women to serve in the House of Representatives, serving along with Rep. Minnie J. Grinstead, Rep. Minnie Minnich and Rep. Nellie Cline. She was elected to the House of Representatives in 1920 and reelected in 1921.

Representative Walker was a teacher and associate editor of a newspaper owned by her husband, in addition to her service in the Kansas Legislature. A native of Jewell County, Kansas, she was president of the Women's Christian Temperance Union and president of the Federation of Women's Clubs. She was also a Sunday school superintendent in the Methodist Church.

1921-1922 Kansas House of Representatives Committee Assignments

- Cities of the Second Class
- Education
- State Affairs
- State Institutions

1923-1924 Kansas House of Representatives Committee Assignments

- Vice Chairman of State Affairs
- Cities of the Second Class
- Education
