= Minnie J. Grinstead =

American politician (1869–1925)

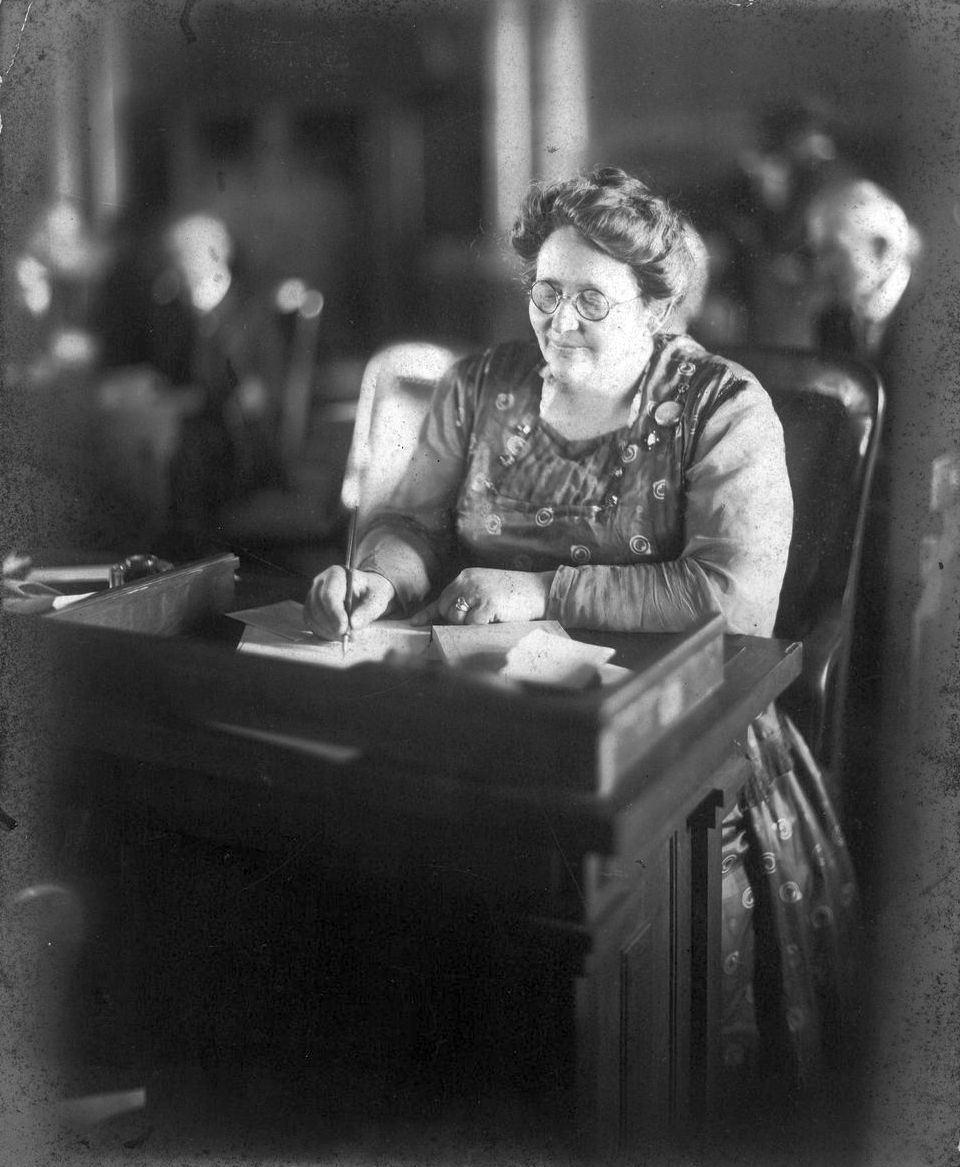
- Minnie J. Grinstead (circa 1920)

Member of the Kansas House of Representatives from the Seward County, Kansas district
- In office 1918–1924

Personal details
- Born: September 30, 1869 Crawford County, Kansas
- Died: December 24, 1925 (aged 56) Liberal, Kansas
- Party: Republican
- Spouse: Virgil Grinstead
- Profession: Teacher

Minnie J. Grinstead (née Johnson; born September 30, 1869 – December 24, 1925) was an American teacher, politician, and temperance lecturer and organizer. She was the first female member of the Kansas House of Representatives. Grinstead served as a state representative from 1918 to 1924. She was a Republican.

== Biography ==
Grinstead was born on September 30, 1869, in Crawford County, Kansas.

During her tenure in the Kansas House of Representatives she served as chairman of the House Education Committee, chairman of the House Public Welfare Committee and as a member of the House Roads and Highways Committee. In 1921 she was appointed by Gov. Henry Justin Allen to the State School Code Commission. The commission's job was to study the state's education laws and make recommendations to the 1923 Kansas Legislature for legislation related to education law.

Among the bills she had signed into law during her tenure in the House were bills related to organizing free public libraries in every county in Kansas and permitting county governments to have fences cross roads.

She was joined in the House of Representatives in 1921 by Rep. Minnie Minnich, Rep. Nellie Cline and Rep. Ida Walker.

In September 1924, it was reported that U.S. president Calvin Coolidge was considering Grinstead to head the United States Civil Service Commission. After leaving the state House of Representatives she was elected Probate Judge of Seward County, Kansas and held that position until her death.

Grinstead died in her home on December 24, 1925, following complications (stroke) arising from a fall.

== Commemoration ==
A painting by Phyllis Garibay-Coon depicting her and other Kansas suffragists was unveiled at the Kansas Statehouse in January 2025. It is titled "Rebel Women" and is the first art installation by any woman artist to be in the Kansas Statehouse.
