= Nellie Cline Steenson =

American 20th century politician

Kansas House of Representatives
- In office 1920–1924

Idaho House of Representatives

Idaho Senate

Personal details
- Born: December 7, 1885 Larned, Kansas
- Died: April 1, 1984 (aged 98)
- Party: Democratic
- Education: Baker University

Nellie Cline Steenson (December 7, 1885 – April 1, 1984) was an American politician and lawyer who served in the Kansas House of Representatives, Idaho House of Representatives and Idaho Senate. A Democrat, she was the elected county attorney of Pawnee County, Kansas before her 1920 election to the Kansas House of Representatives, where she served two terms. Moving to Pocatello, Idaho in 1935, she entered Idaho politics in 1942 and was the first woman elected to the Idaho Senate. She served a total of eight terms in the Idaho Legislature.

Senator Steenson was the first woman to argue a case before the Kansas Supreme Court.

A graduate of Baker University in Baldwin City, Kansas and a native of Larned, Kansas, she was part of the second group of women to serve in the Kansas House of Representatives, serving with Rep. Minnie J. Grinstead, Rep. Minnie Minnich and Rep. Ida Walker. During her tenure in the Kansas Legislature, she authored the state's first law providing protections to farm labor. During her tenure in the Idaho Legislature she passed legislation to provide pensions for retired police officers and firefighters and worked to promote the University of Idaho.

1921–1922 Kansas House of Representatives Committee Assignments

- Education
- Irrigation
- Judiciary
- State Institutions

1923–1924 Kansas House of Representatives Committee Assignments

- Agriculture
- Buildings and Grounds
- Education
- Judiciary
