= Bill Rhiley =

American politician, businessman, and educator

Member of the Kansas House of Representatives from the 80th district
- Incumbent
- Assumed office January 14, 2019
- Preceded by: Anita Judd-Jenkins

Personal details
- Party: Republican
- Education: University of Nebraska–Lincoln (BS, BA); Southwestern College (MEd)

Bill Rhiley is an American politician, businessman, and former educator serving as a member of the Kansas House of Representatives from the 80th district. Elected in 2018, he assumed office in January 2019.

== Education ==
Rhiley earned a Bachelor of Science degree in business administration and a Bachelor of Arts in business education from the University of Nebraska–Lincoln, followed by a Master of Education from Southwestern College.

== Career ==
Before entering politics, Rhiley worked a high school business and technology teacher, computer system integrator, and special education teacher. He was also the publisher of the Belle Plaine News and Oxford Register, both in Belle Plaine, Kansas. He owns a bed and breakfast in Wellington, Kansas with his wife. In the 2018 election for the 80th district of the Kansas House of Representatives, Rhiley defeated incumbent Anita Judd-Jenkins in the Republican primary. He did not face a Democratic challenger in the 2018 or 2020 election.
