= Webster Roth =

American politician

Member of the Kansas House of Representatives from the 79th district
- Incumbent
- Assumed office January 9, 2023
- Preceded by: Cheryl Helmer

Personal details
- Party: Republican

Webster T. Roth is an American politician. A member of the Republican Party, he has served as the representative for the 79th district in the Kansas House of Representatives since 2023.
