= Kellogg, Kansas =

Unincorporated community in Cowley County, Kansas

Coordinates: 37°15′33″N 97°06′34″W

Kellogg is an unincorporated community in Cowley County, Kansas, United States.

== History ==
A post office was established in Kellogg in 1884, and remained in operation until it was discontinued in 1910.

== Education ==
The community is served by Oxford USD 358 public school district.
