= Old Oxford Mill =

- U.S. National Register of Historic Places
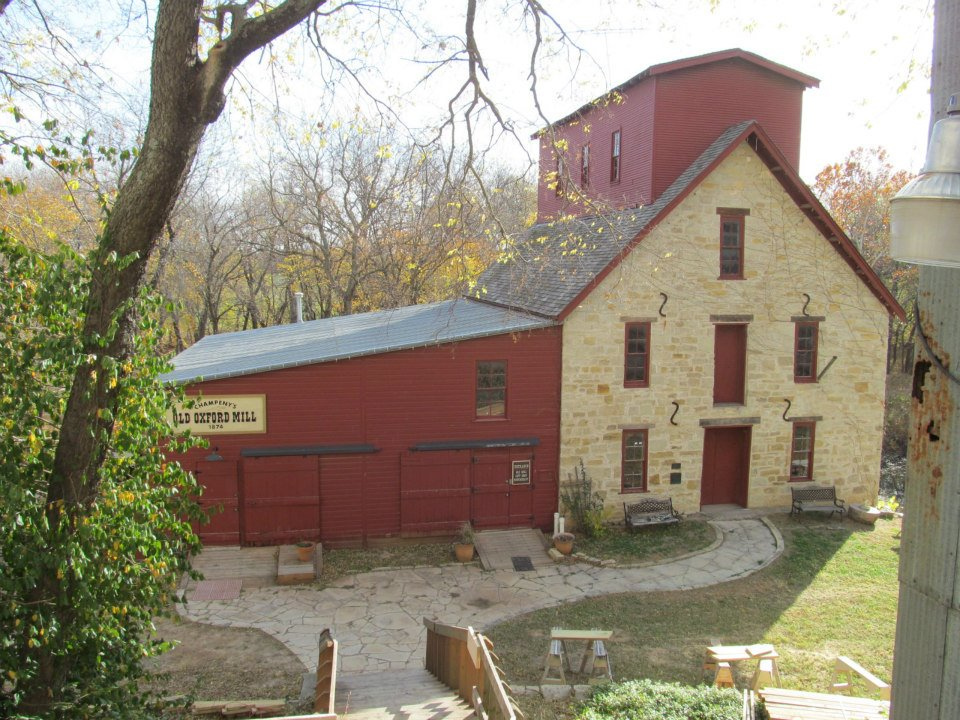

- Location within Kansas Location within the United States
- Location: Northeast of Oxford, Kansas
- Coordinates: 37°17′40″N 97°09′30″W
- Area: 12.5 acres (5.1 ha)
- Built: 1875
- Built by: Hewitt, John; Cook, D.N.
- NRHP reference No.: 82002677
- Added to NRHP: April 26, 1982

The Old Oxford Mill near Oxford, Kansas was built in 1875. It was listed on the National Register of Historic Places in 1982.

The mill is a three-story stone building, 40 by 30 feet (12.2 m × 9.1 m) in plan. It has a steep gable roof.

The listing included three contributing buildings.
