= Geuda Springs, Kansas =

City in Cowley and Sumner County, Kansas

- City
- Location within Sumner County and Kansas

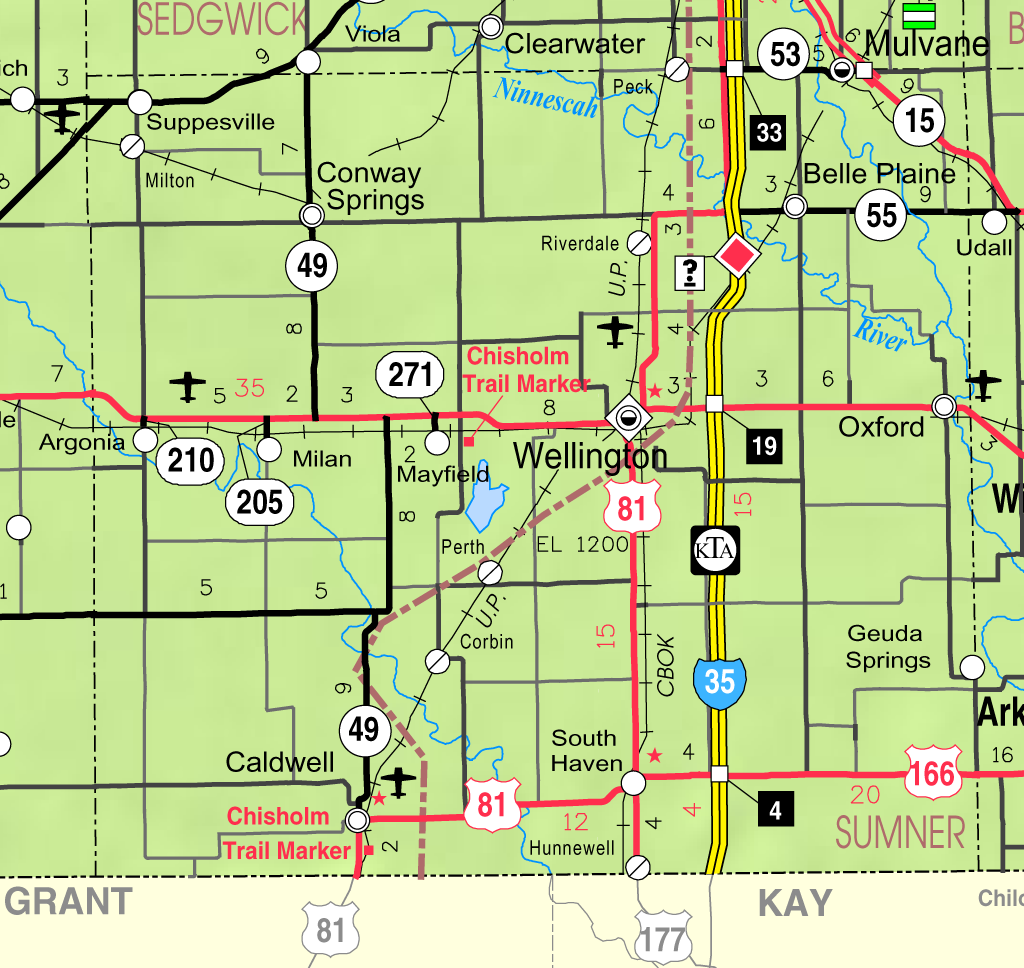
- KDOT map of Sumner County (legend)
- Coordinates: 37°06′41″N 97°09′02″W
- Country: United States
- State: Kansas
- Counties: Cowley, Sumner
- Founded: 1870s
- Incorporated: 1884
- Named for: Nearby mineral spring

Area
  - Total: 0.34 sq mi (0.88 km^{2})
  - Land: 0.34 sq mi (0.88 km^{2})
  - Water: 0 sq mi (0.00 km^{2})
- Elevation: 1,135 ft (346 m)

Population (2020)
  - Total: 158
  - Density: 470/sq mi (180/km^{2})
- Time zone: UTC-6 (CST)
  - Summer (DST): UTC-5 (CDT)
- ZIP Code: 67051
- Area code: 620
- FIPS code: 20-26200
- GNIS ID: 2394886

Geuda Springs is a city in Cowley and Sumner counties in the U.S. state of Kansas. As of the 2020 census, the population of the city was 158.

== History ==
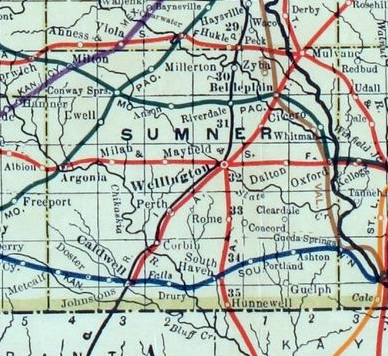
1915 railroad map of Sumner County

On the line between Cowley and Sumner counties is a remarkable group of salt springs that each put out 100 to 450 gallons per hour and have been known since the earliest settlement of that region. These springs are on a branch of the St. Louis & San Francisco railroad, a little to the north of the town of Geuda Springs and about 7 miles (11 km) from Arkansas City. The waters from these springs infiltrate the waters of the nearby creeks. A lake formed by the creek near these springs has been greatly enlarged by damming the creek and now covers about 50 acres (200,000 m^{2}), making it the largest body of salt water in the state. Geuda is said to be an Indian word, Ge-u-da, meaning healing springs, and the place must have been a well known stopping place with the Indians. Many improvements were made at the springs during the late 1880s, including a bath-house and hotel, lake improvements, and new automobile access. Much of the water has been bottled and shipped to points in Kansas and adjoining states. About 1890, a dam with a flume outlet was built across the salt marsh just north of the springs, which filled the marsh with water and created a lake large enough for recreational boating.

Later in the 1900s, the population of Geuda Springs slowly declined. During the 1950s, Geuda Springs had a bar which featured slot machines, dancing and music. A volunteer fire department exists to protect the town and the surrounding area but primary fire protection is provided by Arkansas City. In the 1990s, a new community center was built for the residents. It is surrounded by homes over 80 years of age and an old church building. Geuda Springs has a cemetery to the northwest of town with tombstones dating to the 1870s. One notable gunfighter Luke Short, died in Geuda Springs in 1893 of congestive heart failure.

== Geography ==
According to the United States Census Bureau, the city has a total area of 0.35 square miles (0.91 km^{2}), all land.

== Demographics ==
Historical population
Census	Pop.	Note	%±
1890	355		—
1900	218		−38.6%
1910	254		16.5%
1920	266		4.7%
1930	340		27.8%
1940	275		−19.1%
1950	245		−10.9%
1960	223		−9.0%
1970	223		0.0%
1980	217		−2.7%
1990	219		0.9%
2000	212		−3.2%
2010	185		−12.7%
2020	158		−14.6%
U.S. Decennial Census

=== 2020 census ===
The 2020 United States census counted 158 people, 71 households, and 44 families in Geuda Springs. The population density was 459.3 per square mile (177.3/km^{2}). There were 80 housing units at an average density of 232.6 per square mile (89.8/km^{2}). The racial makeup was 85.44% (135) white or European American (85.44% non-Hispanic white), 1.27% (2) black or African-American, 3.16% (5) Native American or Alaska Native, 0.63% (1) Asian, 0.0% (0) Pacific Islander or Native Hawaiian, 1.27% (2) from other races, and 8.23% (13) from two or more races. Hispanic or Latino of any race was 0.63% (1) of the population.

Of the 71 households, 26.8% had children under the age of 18; 46.5% were married couples living together; 14.1% had a female householder with no spouse or partner present. 33.8% of households consisted of individuals and 16.9% had someone living alone who was 65 years of age or older. The average household size was 1.9 and the average family size was 2.5. The percent of those with a bachelor's degree or higher was estimated to be 5.1% of the population.

21.5% of the population was under the age of 18, 5.1% from 18 to 24, 24.7% from 25 to 44, 29.1% from 45 to 64, and 19.6% who were 65 years of age or older. The median age was 43.5 years. For every 100 females, there were 90.4 males. For every 100 females ages 18 and older, there were 87.9 males.

The 2016–2020 5-year American Community Survey estimates show that the median household income was $43,942 (with a margin of error of +/- $5,575). Males had a median income of $35,313 (+/- $26,750) versus $22,083 (+/- $18,723) for females. The median income for those above 16 years old was $26,250 (+/- $15,039). Approximately, 0.0% of families and 1.5% of the population were below the poverty line, including 0.0% of those under the age of 18 and 0.0% of those ages 65 or over.

=== 2010 census ===
As of the census of 2010, there were 185 people, 77 households, and 47 families living in the city. The population density was 528.6 inhabitants per square mile (204.1/km^{2}). There were 88 housing units at an average density of 251.4 per square mile (97.1/km^{2}). The racial makeup of the city was 97.8% White, 0.5% Native American, 0.5% Pacific Islander, and 1.1% from two or more races. Hispanic or Latino of any race were 0.5% of the population.

There were 77 households, of which 27.3% had children under the age of 18 living with them, 45.5% were married couples living together, 9.1% had a female householder with no husband present, 6.5% had a male householder with no wife present, and 39.0% were non-families. 35.1% of all households were made up of individuals, and 14.3% had someone living alone who was 65 years of age or older. The average household size was 2.40 and the average family size was 3.04.

The median age in the city was 36.8 years. 25.4% of residents were under the age of 18; 7.5% were between the ages of 18 and 24; 24.3% were from 25 to 44; 26.9% were from 45 to 64; and 15.7% were 65 years of age or older. The gender makeup of the city was 53.5% male and 46.5% female.

=== 2000 census ===
As of the census of 2000, there were 212 people, 85 households, and 58 families living in the city. The population density was 476.2 inhabitants per square mile (183.9/km^{2}). There were 88 housing units at an average density of 197.7 per square mile (76.3/km^{2}). The racial makeup of the city was 98.58% White, 0.47% Native American, and 0.94% from two or more races. Hispanic or Latino of any race were 1.89% of the population.

There were 85 households, out of which 22.4% had children under the age of 18 living with them, 58.8% were married couples living together, 9.4% had a female householder with no husband present, and 30.6% were non-families. 28.2% of all households were made up of individuals, and 11.8% had someone living alone who was 65 years of age or older. The average household size was 2.49 and the average family size was 3.03.

In the city, the population was spread out, with 21.7% under the age of 18, 12.7% from 18 to 24, 23.1% from 25 to 44, 27.4% from 45 to 64, and 15.1% who were 65 years of age or older. The median age was 41 years. For every 100 females, there were 92.7 males. For every 100 females age 18 and over, there were 90.8 males.

The median income for a household in the city was $38,250, and the median income for a family was $41,250. Males had a median income of $28,750 versus $17,639 for females. The per capita income for the city was $12,787. About 14.7% of families and 16.0% of the population were below the poverty line, including 17.4% of those under the age of eighteen and none of those 65 or over.

== Education ==
The community is served by Oxford USD 358 public school district.
