= Wellington Carnegie Library =

- U.S. National Register of Historic Places
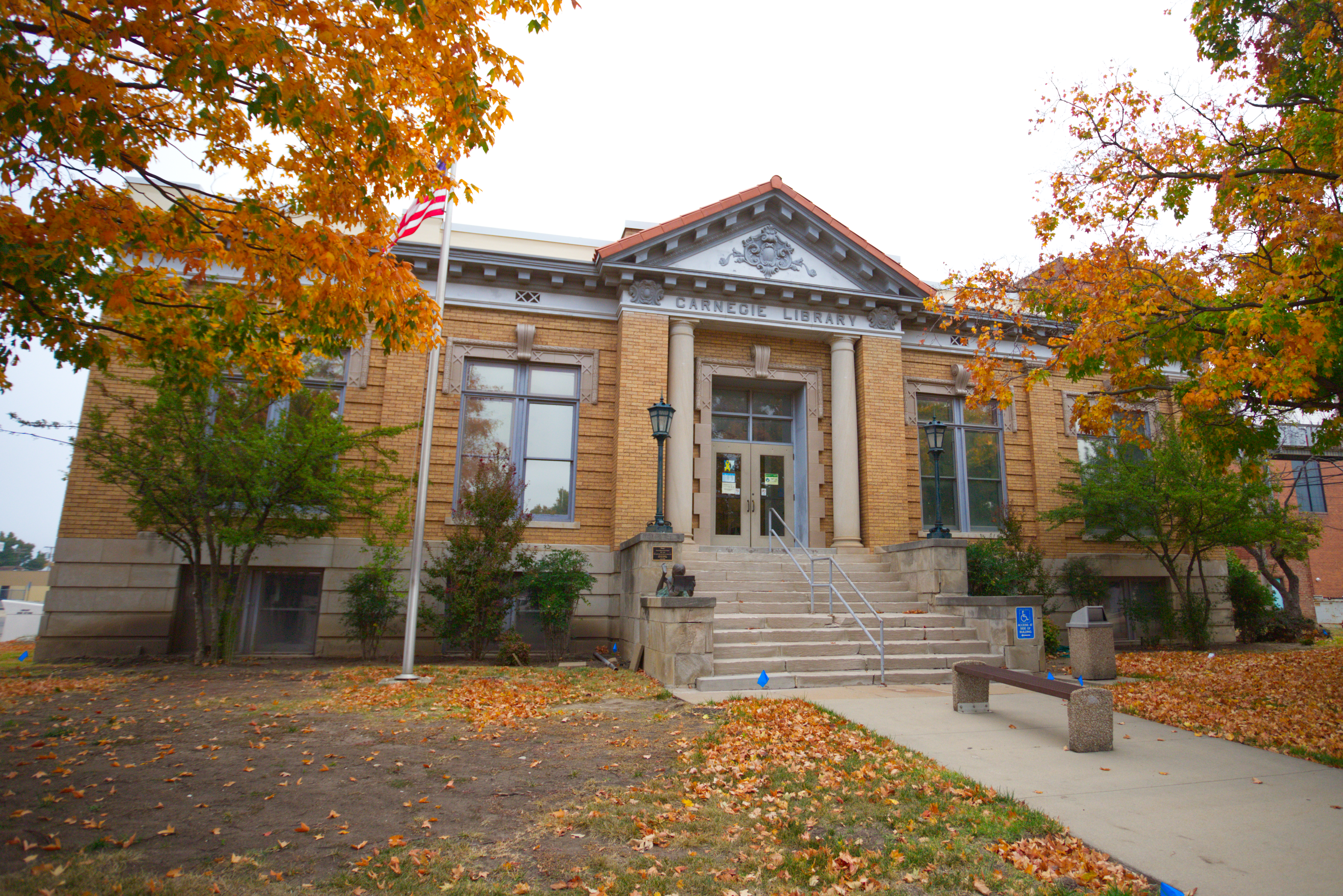
- Wellington Public Library

- Location within Kansas Location within the United States
- Location: 121 W. Seventh, Wellington, Kansas
- Coordinates: 37°16′03″N 97°23′56″W
- Area: less than one acre
- Built: c.1916
- Built by: J.H. Mitchell
- Architect: L.W. Terry
- Architectural style: Classical Revival
- MPS: Carnegie Libraries of Kansas TR
- NRHP reference No.: 87000973
- Added to NRHP: June 25, 1987

The Wellington Carnegie Library, located at 121 W. Seventh in Wellington, Kansas, is a Carnegie library built in c.1916. It was listed on the National Register of Historic Places in 1987.

It is one of 63 Carnegie libraries built in Kansas during the early 20th century. It is Classical Revival in style.
