= John Potucek (Kansas politician) =

American politician (1901–1982)

Member of the Kansas Senate from the 26th district
- In office 1945–1960
- Preceded by: Otto B. Wenrich
- Succeeded by: Ford Harbaugh

Personal details
- Born: July 17, 1901 Sumner County, Kansas, USA
- Died: June 26, 1982 (aged 80)
- Party: Democratic
- Spouse: Vera Epperson (m. 1935)
- Children: 3
- Education: University of Kansas
- Occupation: Lawyer

John Albert Potucek (July 17, 1901 - June 26, 1982) was a lawyer and state legislator in Kansas. He served in the Kansas Senate from 1945 to 1960. He lived in the city of Wellington.

== Early life and education ==
Potucek was born July 17, 1901, on a farm in Sumner County, Kansas. His parents were Joseph and Louisa Potucek, and he had an older sister Adelaide and two younger siblings Lona and Joseph. He went to the University of Kansas and received his law degree before obtaining the bar in 1924.

== Career ==
Although he was a Democrat, he was invited to run for county attorney on the Republican ticket in 1924, but refused, saying he would wait to run as a Democrat. He ran in 1928 but was defeated by the Republican candidate. He ran again in 1930 and won. He was efficient in the role, prosecuting 300 cases in his first four months and winning all but four. In total he was elected as county attorney five times.

He refused to take several thousand dollars in $25 fees for convicting liquor law violations, saying "the taxpayers don't have to bribe me to do my job."

In 1944 he was elected to the Kansas Senate, beating the incumbent Republican Otto B. Wenrich 4,755 to 4,350 votes. He was the only Democratic senator that session.

He entered the race for governor of Kansas in 1946 but withdrew to focus on the Senate. He stood again for the governorship in 1950, but lost the Democratic primary to Ken Anderson, who he immediately started supporting. Anderson eventually lost to the Republican candidate Frank L. Hagaman.

Potucek stood for re-election to the Senate in 1960 and lost to Republican Ford Harbaugh.

Potucek served as a district judge, and he later returned to the position of county attorney and served till he resigned in 1975 to take the new position of county counselor.

Potucek married Vera Epperson on February 16, 1935, and died June 26, 1982.
