= Wellington Municipal Airport =

- IATA: none; ICAO: KEGT; FAA LID: EGT

Summary
- Airport type: Public
- Owner: City of Wellington
- Serves: Wellington, Kansas
- Elevation AMSL: 1,277 ft / 389 m
- Coordinates: 37°19′25″N 097°23′18″W
- Interactive map of Wellington Municipal Airport

Runways
Direction	Length		Surface
Direction	ft	m	Surface
18/36	5,201	1,585	Concrete

Statistics (2021)
- Aircraft operations (year ending 5/21/2021): 18,100
- Based aircraft: 32
- Source: Federal Aviation Administration

Wellington Municipal Airport (ICAO: KEGT, FAA LID: EGT) is a small American airport three miles north of Wellington, Kansas, in Sumner County.

The airport's Federal Aviation Administration three-letter location identifier is EGT and it has no International Air Transport Association code.

== Facilities ==
The airport covers 190 acres (77 ha) at an elevation of 1,277 feet (389 m). Its one runway, 18/36, is 5,201 by 100 feet (1,585 x 30 m) concrete.

In the year ending May 21, 2021, the airport had 18,100 aircraft operations, an average of 50 per day: 98% general aviation, 1% commercial, and <1% military. At that time 32 aircraft were based at the airport, of which 30 were single-engine and 2 multi-engine.

== See also ==
- List of airports in Kansas
