= Cheryl Helmer =

American politician

Member of the Kansas House of Representatives from the 79th district
- In office January 14, 2019 – January 9, 2023
- Preceded by: Ed Trimmer
- Succeeded by: Webster Roth

Personal details
- Party: Republican

Cheryl Helmer is an American politician and educator who formerly served as a member of the Kansas House of Representatives as the representative from the 79th District. A former school counselor in Wichita, Kansas, she defeated Democratic Rep. Ed Trimmer in the 2018 election. She was defeated by Webster Roth in the 2022 Republican primary. She is a resident of Mulvane, Kansas.

== Kansas House of Representatives ==
2019-2020 Kansas House of Representatives Committee Assignments

- General Government Budget
- Education
- Rural Revitalization

== Controversy ==
Her career as a politician has been fraught with controversies. As an example, she blamed a break-in at her home on an influx of illegal immigrants. Her rural house is in the country off of a dirt road, nowhere near a town. She insisted without any evidence that the incident was due to nearby Wichita, Kansas being a "sanctuary city".

She has also targeted the LGBTQ+ community. She once famously sponsored a bill that referenced same-sex marriage as "parody marriage" and offered support for conversion therapy and other anti-LGBTQ provisions. When called out on this, she claimed to not have read the bill that she was sponsoring.

Helmer attracted national attention during the COVID-19 pandemic when she requested that Kansas Governor (of the opposing party) produce information on the Governor's hairstyling. “I am respectfully requesting the name and Kansas license No. of the hairdresser who has touched, colored, cut, performed any service on or with Governor Laura Kelly’s hair since March 12,” Helmer said. Governor Kelly later shared that her husband has been cutting her hair during the suspension of services from professional hairstylists.

In 2022, she again drew national controversy after writing in an email to a Kansas University student who identifies as transfeminine that she did not "appreciate the huge transgender female who is now in our restrooms in the Capitol," a comment aimed at Rep. Stephanie Byers, the first openly transgender person to serve in the state legislature. In the email, Helmer went on to falsely assert that "little girls have been raped, sodomized and beaten in the restrooms by these supposedly transgenders who may or may not be for real."

Preceded by Ed Trimmer	Kansas House of Representatives Representative from the 79th District; 2019 - 2023	Succeeded by Webster Roth
