= Equality Kansas =

Statewide gay rights advocacy group

The Equality Kansas, formerly Kansas Equality Coalition, is a statewide LGBT rights organization whose mission is to end discrimination based on sexual orientation and gender identity and expression. The coalition seeks to ensure the dignity, safety and legal equality of all Kansans.

Created on October 9, 2005, during a meeting in Emporia, Kansas, Equality Kansas is dedicated to ending discrimination based on sexual orientation and gender identity.

== Chapters ==
Equality Kansas started with five chapters:

- Johnson County (since reorganized as the Northeast Kansas Chapter)
- Lawrence/Douglas County
- Topeka
- The Flint Hills (since reorganized as the Riley/Geary County Chapter)
- Wichita

Since then, six more chapters have been added:

- Southwest Kansas (March 14, 2006)
- North Central (July 26, 2006)
- South East (January 13, 2008)
- Central Plains (April 27, 2008)
- Hutchinson Area (June 27, 2010)
- Northwest Kansas (July 18, 2010)

== Activities ==
Members of the Lawrence chapter were instrumental in persuading the city of Lawrence, Kansas, to institute a domestic partnership registry in 2007. It is the first of its kind in the state. Lawrence is the seat of Douglas County, which is the only county in Kansas where a majority of voters opposed the state's 2005 constitutional amendment banning same-sex marriage.

In February 2007, members of Equality Kansas testified before the Kansas House Committee on Federal and State affairs in opposition to a bill that would have outlawed domestic partnership registries in the state. No floor vote on the bill was held in 2007. In February 2008, the Kansas House of Representatives voted 66 to 50 to refer the bill to the House Judiciary Committee for more hearings.

In August 2007, members of the coalition stood with then Kansas Governor Kathleen Sebelius as she signed an executive order banning discrimination in employment based on sexual orientation and gender identity. The order applies to the executive branch of state government.

In March 2009, Members of the Topeka chapter were instrumental in successfully lobbying the Board of the Topeka/Shawnee Co. Library to prevent a move by local religious conservatives to restrict access and censor predominantly LGBT sexual education materials.

== Kansas Equality PAC ==
In 2006, the coalition formed a political action committee, Equality Kansas PAC, to work toward the election of state and local candidates for office in Kansas who support equality for LGBTQ Kansans. The mission of the PAC is to end discrimination based on sexual orientation and gender identity/expression and to ensure the dignity, safety and legal equality of all Kansans by working to elect fair minded candidates to office, regardless of party affiliation.

== See also ==
- LGBT rights in the United States
- List of LGBT rights organizations
- Human Rights Campaign
