= Downtown Wellington Historic District =

Historic district in Kansas, United States

- U.S. National Register of Historic Places
- U.S. Historic district
- Location within Kansas Location within the United States
- Location: Roughly bounded by 19th St., 4th St., Jefferson Ave. and the alley behind the Washington Ave.-facing buildings, Wellington, Kansas
- Coordinates: 37°16′00″N 97°23′55″W
- Area: 21 acres (8.5 ha)
- Architect: Smith & White; Taylor, J.K.; Boiler; Roberts, R.H.; Brostrom, E.O; Mitche
- Architectural style: Art Deco, Moderne, International
- NRHP reference No.: 07000600
- Added to NRHP: June 27, 2007

The Downtown Wellington Historic District, in Wellington, Kansas, is a 21 acres (8.5 ha) historic district which was listed on the National Register of Historic Places in 2007.

The district follows Washington Avenue, the main business thoroughfare, and is roughly bounded by 19th St., 4th St., Jefferson Ave. and the alley behind the Washington Ave.-facing buildings. The listing included 65 contributing buildings.
