= H. F. Smith House =

Historic house in Kansas, United States

- U.S. National Register of Historic Places
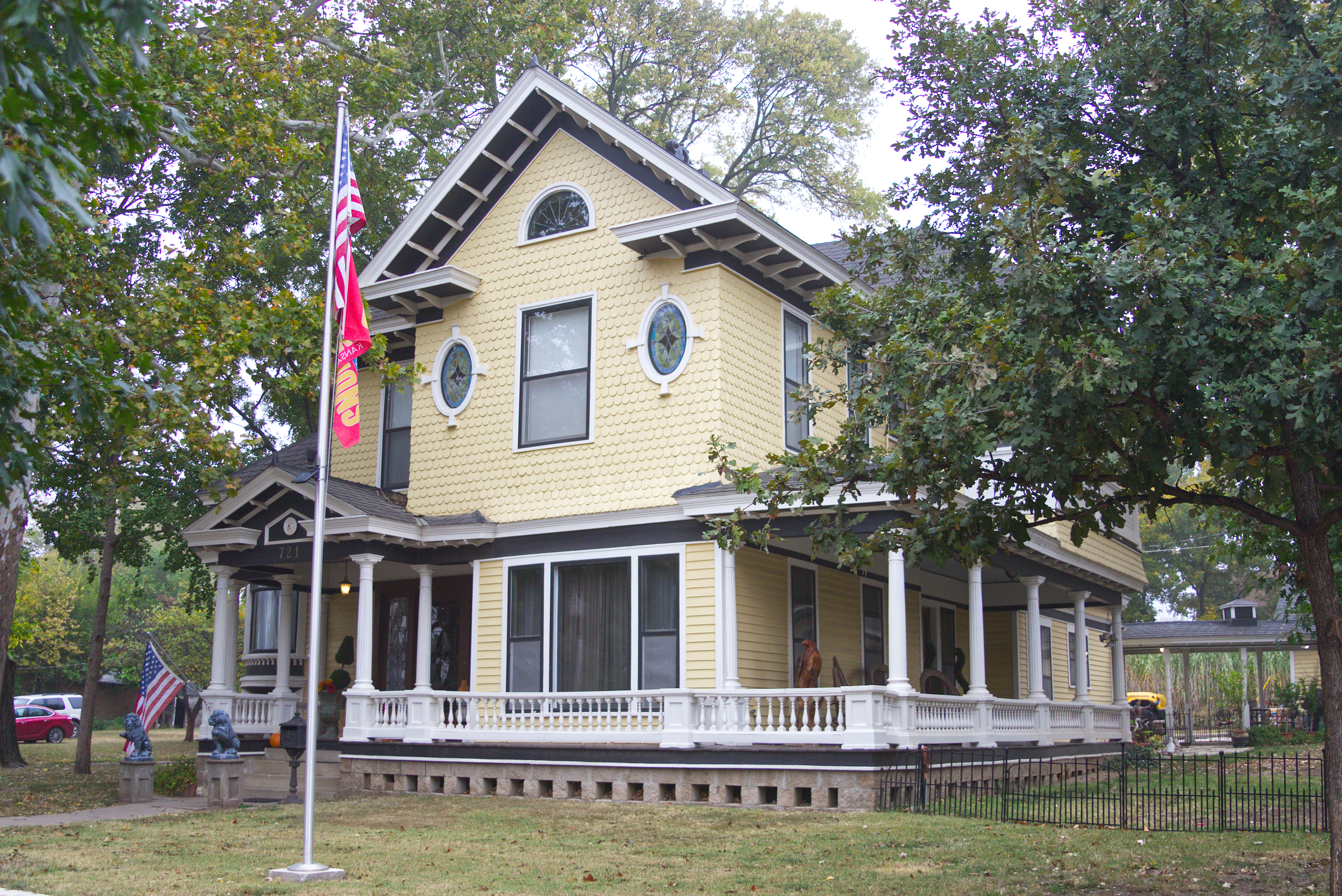
- H. F. Smith House

- Location within Kansas Location within the United States
- Location: 721 W. Harvey Ave., Wellington, Kansas
- Coordinates: 37°15′57″N 97°24′23″W
- Area: less than one acre
- Built: 1886, 1896
- Built by: Dumont, Elbert
- Architectural style: Queen Anne
- NRHP reference No.: 07000318
- Added to NRHP: April 18, 2007

The H. F. Smith House, at 721 W. Harvey Ave. in Wellington, Kansas, is a Queen Anne-style house built in 1886 as a one-story residence. It was expanded in 1896 by builder and architect Elbert Dumond to become the two-story Queen Anne Free Classic structure that it is now.

It was listed on the National Register of Historic Places in 2007.
