= 2005 Kansas Amendment 1 =

Amendment 1
- April 5, 2005
- Kansas Marriage Amendment

Results
Choice	Votes	%
Yes	417,627	69.95%
No	179,432	30.05%
Valid votes	597,059	99.71%
Invalid or blank votes	1,749	0.29%
Total votes	598,808	100.00%
Registered voters/turnout	1,688,926	35.45%
County results
Yes
90%–100%
80%–90%
70%–80%
60%–70%
50%–60%
No
60–70%

Kansas Amendment 1, which was put before voters on April 5, 2005, is an amendment to the Kansas Constitution that makes it unconstitutional for the state to recognize or perform same-sex marriages or civil unions. The referendum was approved by almost 70% of the voters.

The amendment states:

(a) The marriage contract is to be considered in law as a civil contract. Marriage shall be constituted by one man and one woman only. All other marriages are declared to be contrary to the public policy of this state and are void. (b) No relationship, other than a marriage, shall be recognized by the state as entitling the parties to the rights or incidents of marriage.

The Kansas Equality Coalition grew out of the organized but ultimately unsuccessful political opposition to the amendment. The KEC is a statewide group of people determined to end discrimination based on sexual orientation and gender identity and expression.

Only Douglas County, which contains Lawrence and the University of Kansas, voted against the amendment.

== Impact of Supreme Court decisions ==
Following the Supreme Court decision in Schmidt v. Moriarty in 2014, 19 Kansas counties began issuing marriage licenses to same sex couples. Following the ruling in Obergefell v. Hodges in 2015, all Kansas counties were issuing same sex marriage certificates. The combination of the Supreme Court decisions, effectively, albeit unofficially, overturned the constitutional amendment.
