= Bartlett Arboretum (Kansas) =

Arboretum in Belle Plaine, Kansas, United States

- U.S. National Register of Historic Places
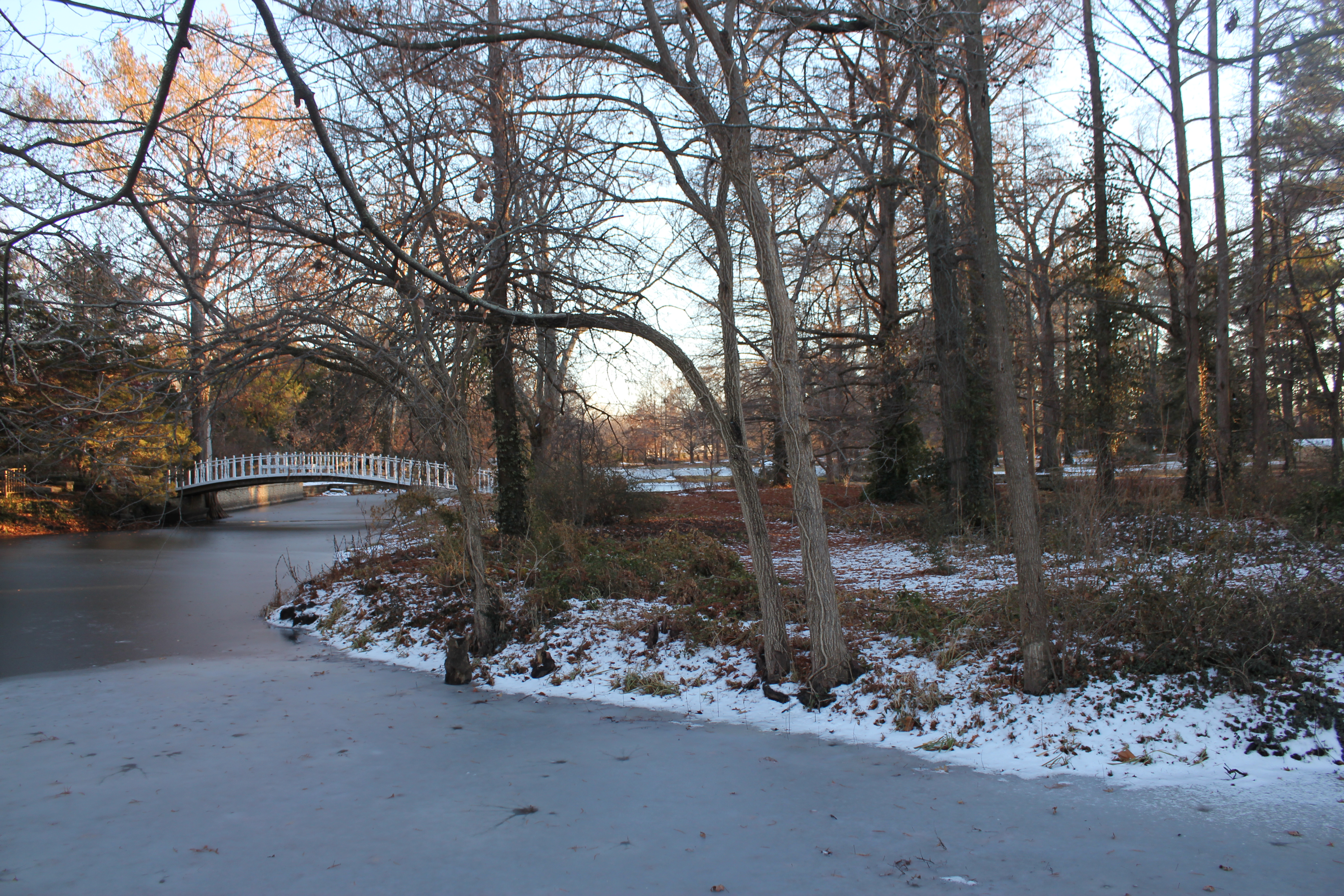
- The arboretum in late 2013.

- Location within Kansas Location within the United States
- Location: SW Corner of HWY 55 and Line St., Belle Plaine, Kansas
- Coordinates: 37°23′31″N 97°17′8″W
- Area: 15.2 acres (6.2 ha)
- Website: Official website
- NRHP reference No.: 10000180
- Added to NRHP: April 19, 2010

The Bartlett Arboretum (20 acres; 8 hectares) is a historic, nonprofit arboretum located in Belle Plaine, Kansas, United States. It is privately owned, and open to the public seasonally, as well as upon special request. It includes a stage and seating area for outdoor concerts.

The Arboretum was established in 1910 by Dr. Walter Bartlett, a general practitioner from Belle Plaine, who purchased pastureland to create his own arboretum. In the 1930s the arboretum became an approved test site for the United States Department of Agriculture which provided plants and trees from around the world for hardiness tests.

It incorporates a 135-year-old Santa Fe Railroad Depot, converted to a studio, at its edge.

The Arboretum now contains massive cypress, oaks and champion Japanese maples. It includes an apiary to facilitate pollination. Its steward is Robin Lynn Macy, otherwise known as a founding member of the Dixie Chicks bluegrass and country music group.

It was developed over many years, from relatively barren land with water only in a slough. Early in the process, Bartlett formed a dam and also built 4 islands in the slough.

According to the National Park Service:

The Bartlett Arboretum is a private fifteen acre park in rural Belle Plaine, Kansas, that evolved in early 20th century from a recreational park and conservation area to an arboretum with formal gardens and experimental plots and nurseries. The arboretum largely reflects the influences of professional landscape architect and horticulturist Glenn Bartlett, his wife and floral expert Margaret Bartlett, and Glenn's father who first purchased the property in 1910 to be used as a public athletic field for the small community and as a natural reserve complete with water fowl and non-indigenous trees. After years of being under maintained, the Bartlett Arboretum is currently being restored with the goal for it to serve as an educational and events space.

The property was listed on the U.S. National Register of Historic Places on April 19, 2010. The listing was announced as the featured listing in the National Park Service's weekly list of May 7, 2010.

== See also ==
- List of botanical gardens in the United States
