= Belle Plaine, Kansas =

City in Sumner County, Kansas

- City
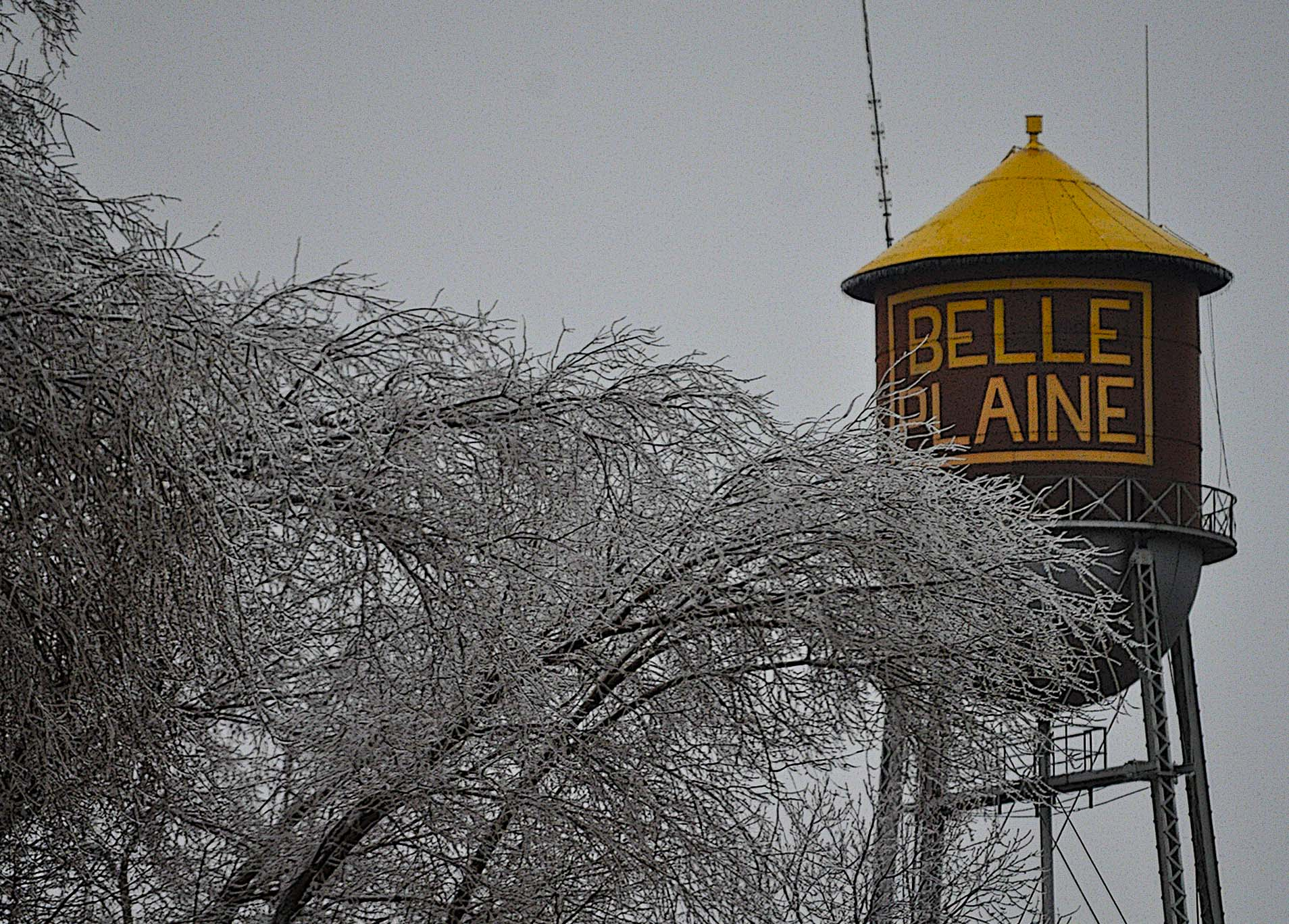
- Belle Plaine water tower (Jan 2017)

- Location within Sumner County and Kansas

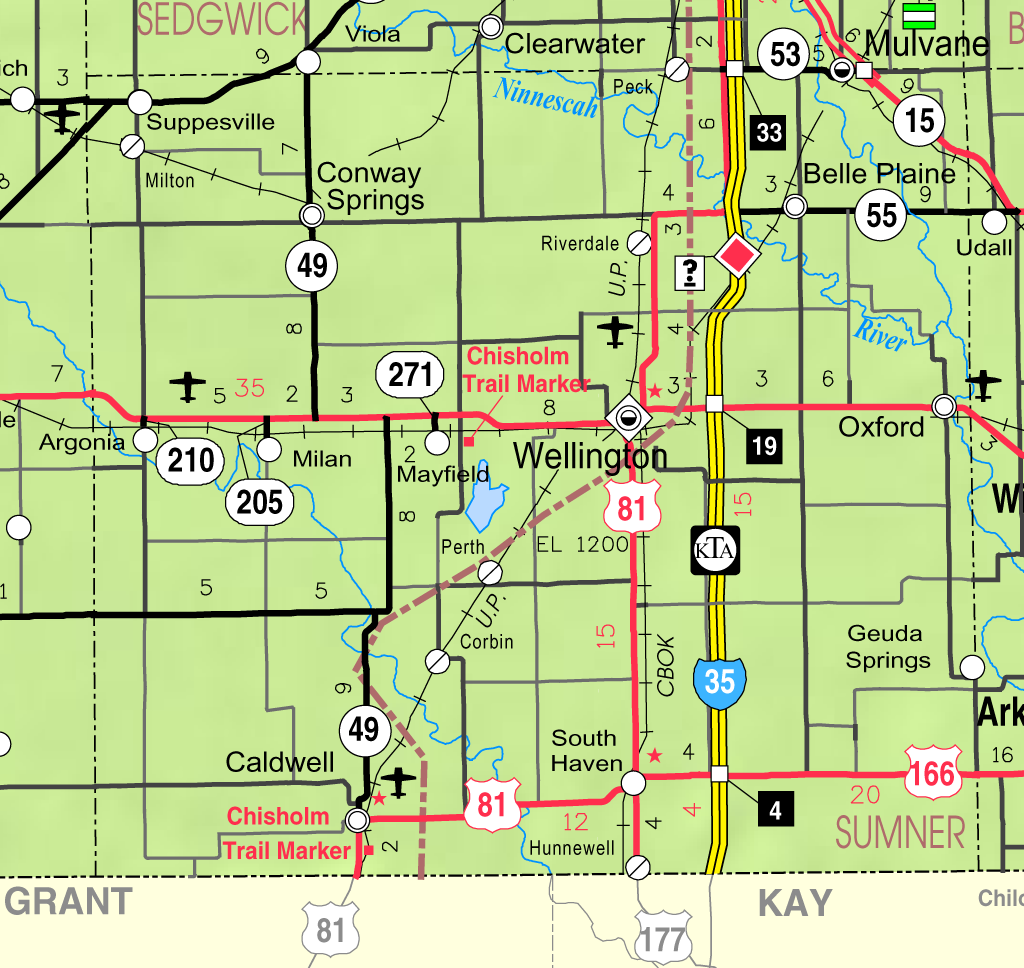
- KDOT map of Sumner County (legend)
- Coordinates: 37°23′36″N 97°16′46″W
- Country: United States
- State: Kansas
- County: Sumner
- Founded: 1871
- Incorporated: 1884
- Named for: beautiful plain

Area
  - Total: 0.83 sq mi (2.15 km^{2})
  - Land: 0.83 sq mi (2.15 km^{2})
  - Water: 0 sq mi (0.00 km^{2})
- Elevation: 1,221 ft (372 m)

Population (2020)
  - Total: 1,467
  - Density: 1,770/sq mi (682/km^{2})
- Time zone: UTC-6 (CST)
  - Summer (DST): UTC-5 (CDT)
- ZIP Code: 67013
- Area code: 620
- FIPS code: 20-05500
- GNIS ID: 2394114
- Website: bpks.org

Belle Plaine is a city in Sumner County, Kansas, United States. As of the 2020 census, the population of the city was 1,467.

== History ==
Belle Plaine was founded in 1871. Belle Plaine is a French name meaning "beautiful plain". In 1883, Belle Plaine was a station and shipping point for the Southern Central & Fort Scott Railway. By 1910, it was at the junction of two railroads: the Missouri Pacific and the Atchison, Topeka & Santa Fe. The first post office in Belle Plaine was established in April 1871. In the fall of 1871 and spring of 1872, Miss Olive North taught a subscription school, and in 1873, school district (No. 2) was established.

== Geography ==
According to the United States Census Bureau, the city has a total area of 0.91 square miles (2.36 km^{2}), all land.

=== Climate ===
The climate in this area is characterized by hot, humid summers and generally mild to cool winters. According to the Köppen Climate Classification system, Belle Plaine has a humid subtropical climate, abbreviated "Cfa" on climate maps.

== Area events ==
- Belle Plaine's Downtown Festival

== Area attractions ==
- Bartlett Arboretum, a nature preserve which incorporates a small concert venue.

== Demographics ==
Historical population
Census	Pop.	Note	%±
1880	348		—
1890	659		89.4%
1900	551		−16.4%
1910	849		54.1%
1920	839		−1.2%
1930	825		−1.7%
1940	878		6.4%
1950	971		10.6%
1960	1,579		62.6%
1970	1,553		−1.6%
1980	1,706		9.9%
1990	1,649		−3.3%
2000	1,708		3.6%
2010	1,681		−1.6%
2020	1,467		−12.7%
U.S. Decennial Census

=== 2020 census ===
The 2020 United States census counted 1,467 people, 588 households, and 411 families in Belle Plaine. The population density was 1,767.5 per square mile (682.4/km^{2}). There were 653 housing units at an average density of 786.7 per square mile (303.8/km^{2}). The racial makeup was 89.3% (1,310) white or European American (86.37% non-Hispanic white), 0.55% (8) black or African-American, 1.43% (21) Native American or Alaska Native, 0.14% (2) Asian, 0.0% (0) Pacific Islander or Native Hawaiian, 1.5% (22) from other races, and 7.09% (104) from two or more races. Hispanic or Latino of any race was 5.93% (87) of the population.

Of the 588 households, 36.1% had children under the age of 18; 51.0% were married couples living together; 21.6% had a female householder with no spouse or partner present. 24.7% of households consisted of individuals and 13.4% had someone living alone who was 65 years of age or older. The average household size was 2.2 and the average family size was 2.6. The percent of those with a bachelor's degree or higher was estimated to be 10.9% of the population.

26.2% of the population was under the age of 18, 7.8% from 18 to 24, 25.4% from 25 to 44, 24.9% from 45 to 64, and 15.7% who were 65 years of age or older. The median age was 37.8 years. For every 100 females, there were 96.9 males. For every 100 females ages 18 and older, there were 95.0 males.

The 2016–2020 5-year American Community Survey estimates show that the median household income was $58,977 (with a margin of error of +/- $11,281) and the median family income was $70,938 (+/- $14,280). Males had a median income of $45,518 (+/- $3,544) versus $26,806 (+/- $19,456) for females. The median income for those above 16 years old was $38,393 (+/- $15,962). Approximately, 9.8% of families and 13.8% of the population were below the poverty line, including 33.7% of those under the age of 18 and 3.1% of those ages 65 or over.

=== 2010 census ===
As of the census of 2010, there were 1,681 people, 630 households, and 466 families residing in the city. The population density was 1,847.3 inhabitants per square mile (713.2/km^{2}). There were 717 housing units at an average density of 787.9 per square mile (304.2/km^{2}). The racial makeup of the city was 96.1% White, 0.4% African American, 1.1% Native American, 0.1% Asian, 0.1% Pacific Islander, 0.5% from other races, and 1.7% from two or more races. Hispanic or Latino of any race were 3.1% of the population.

There were 630 households, of which 40.8% had children under the age of 18 living with them, 55.2% were married couples living together, 12.2% had a female householder with no husband present, 6.5% had a male householder with no wife present, and 26.0% were non-families. 23.5% of all households were made up of individuals, and 9.7% had someone living alone who was 65 years of age or older. The average household size was 2.67 and the average family size was 3.14.

The median age in the city was 35.5 years. 30.2% of residents were under the age of 18; 7.7% were between the ages of 18 and 24; 24.1% were from 25 to 44; 26% were from 45 to 64; and 12% were 65 years of age or older. The gender makeup of the city was 51.5% male and 48.5% female.

=== 2000 census ===
As of the census of 2000, there were 1,708 people, 662 households, and 475 families residing in the city. The population density was 2,105.9 inhabitants per square mile (813.1/km^{2}). There were 712 housing units at an average density of 877.9 per square mile (339.0/km^{2}). The racial makeup of the city was 93.21% White, 0.06% African American, 0.82% Native American, 0.29% Asian, 1.17% from other races, and 4.45% from two or more races. Hispanic or Latino of any race were 2.22% of the population.

There were 662 households, out of which 38.4% had children under the age of 18 living with them, 56.5% were married couples living together, 11.0% had a female householder with no husband present, and 28.1% were non-families. 26.0% of all households were made up of individuals, and 13.9% had someone living alone who was 65 years of age or older. The average household size was 2.58 and the average family size was 3.12.

In the city, the population was spread out, with 30.7% under the age of 18, 7.4% from 18 to 24, 28.6% from 25 to 44, 19.6% from 45 to 64, and 13.7% who were 65 years of age or older. The median age was 36 years. For every 100 females, there were 98.1 males. For every 100 females age 18 and over, there were 90.5 males.

The median income for a household in the city was $38,125, and the median income for a family was $47,422. Males had a median income of $34,821 versus $22,778 for females. The per capita income for the city was $16,414. About 7.9% of families and 9.2% of the population were below the poverty line, including 11.4% of those under age 18 and 9.0% of those age 65 or over.

== Education ==
The community is served by Belle Plaine USD 357 public school district.

== Notable people ==
- Jesse Beams (1898–1977) - physicist at University of Virginia, was born in Belle Plaine
- Robin Lynn Macy (b. 1958) - math teacher, community organizer, guitarist, co-founder of the Dixie Chicks, director of Bartlett Arboretum
