= Wellington, Kansas =

City in Sumner County

- City and County seat
- Sign in Wellington (2006)

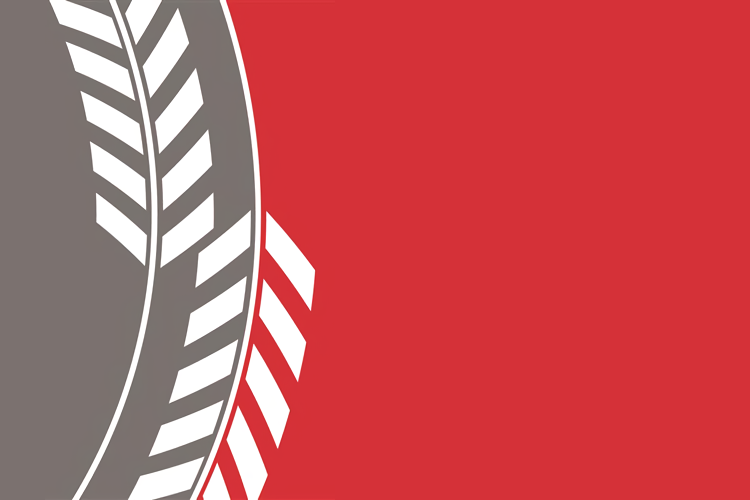
- Flag
- Nickname: "Wheat Capital of the World"
- Location within Sumner County and Kansas

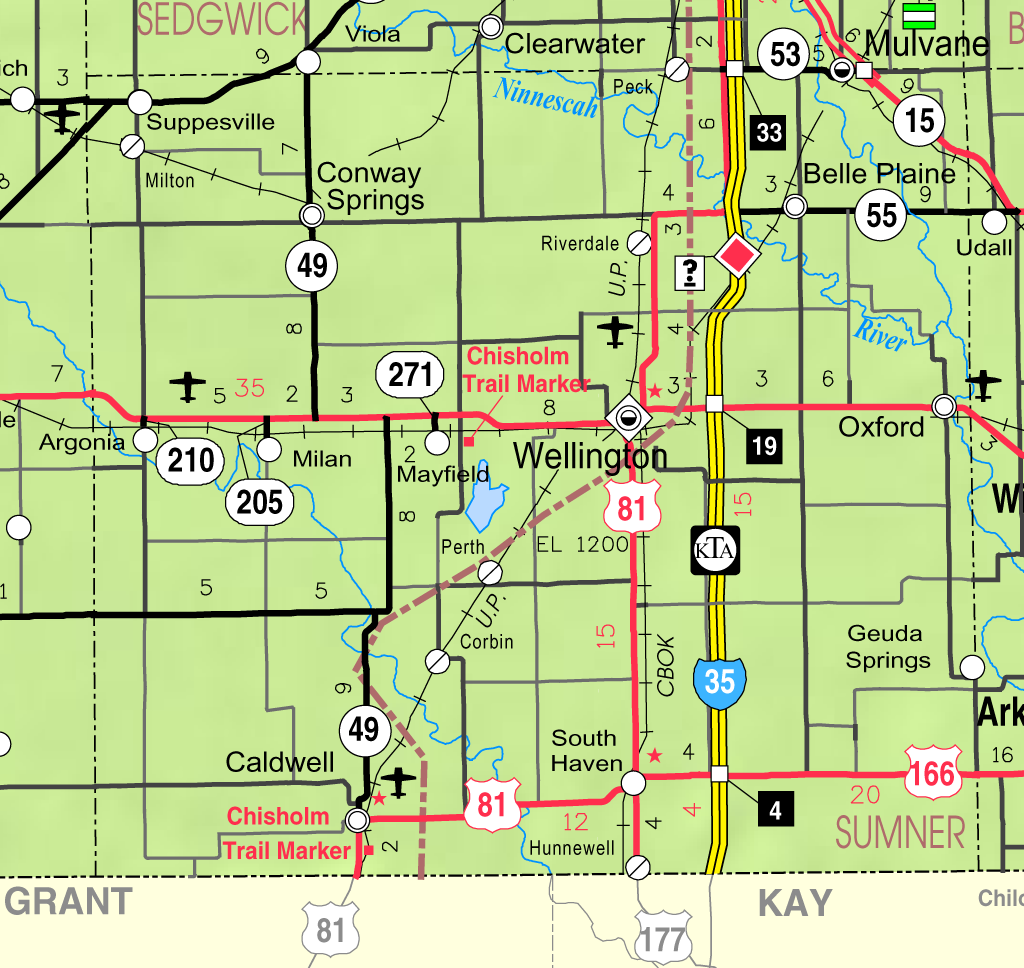
- KDOT map of Sumner County (legend)
- Coordinates: 37°16′02″N 97°24′0″W
- Country: United States
- State: Kansas
- County: Sumner
- Founded: 1870s
- Platted: 1871
- Incorporated: 1872
- Named for: Duke of Wellington

Government
  - Mayor: Joe Soria

Area
  - Total: 8.21 sq mi (21.27 km^{2})
  - Land: 7.32 sq mi (18.96 km^{2})
  - Water: 0.89 sq mi (2.31 km^{2})
- Elevation: 1,224 ft (373 m)

Population (2020)
  - Total: 7,715
  - Density: 1,054/sq mi (406.9/km^{2})
- Time zone: UTC-6 (CST)
  - Summer (DST): UTC-5 (CDT)
- ZIP Code: 67152
- Area code: 620
- FIPS code: 20-76475
- GNIS ID: 485658
- Website: cityofwellington.net

Wellington is a city in and the county seat of Sumner County, Kansas, United States. As of the 2020 census, the population was 7,715.

== History ==
=== 19th century ===
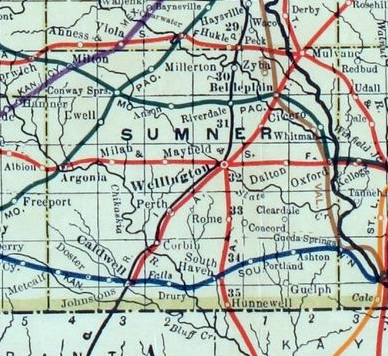
1915 railroad map of Sumner County

Wellington was platted in 1871 and named for the Duke of Wellington. It was designated as the Sumner County seat in 1872, winning out over Sumner City according to the Wellington library. Cattle herders coming up the Chisholm Trail helped to build the early town's economy.

The first post office in Wellington was established in July 1871.

In 1887, the Chicago, Kansas and Nebraska Railway built a north–south branch line from Herington through Wellington to Caldwell. Creditors foreclosed on it 1891 and the railroad was taken over by Chicago, Rock Island and Pacific Railroad, which shut down in 1980 and reorganized as Oklahoma, Kansas and Texas Railroad, merged in 1988 with Missouri Pacific Railroad, merged in 1997 with Union Pacific Railroad. Most locals still refer to this railroad as the "Rock Island".

On May 27, 1892, an estimated F4 tornado struck Wellington, destroying 100 homes and 30 businesses, and killing 12 people in town.

=== 21st century ===
In 2020, Wellington opened a flag design contest. After several rounds of committee and public input, Shayna Templeton's design with wheat stalks on a red, silver, and white flag was selected and revealed in 2021.

== Geography ==
According to the United States Census Bureau, the city has a total area of 8.19 square miles (21.21 km^{2}), of which 7.61 square miles (19.71 km^{2}) is land and 0.58 square miles (1.50 km^{2}) is water.

=== Climate ===
The climate in this area is characterized by hot, humid summers and generally mild to cool winters. According to the Köppen Climate Classification system, Wellington has a humid subtropical climate, abbreviated "Cfa" on climate maps.

Climate data for Wellington, Kansas, 1991–2020 normals, extremes 1894–present
Month	Jan	Feb	Mar	Apr	May	Jun	Jul	Aug	Sep	Oct	Nov	Dec	Year
Record high °F (°C)	79 (26)	88 (31)	94 (34)	99 (37)	103 (39)	112 (44)	120 (49)	119 (48)	112 (44)	101 (38)	87 (31)	85 (29)	120 (49)
Mean maximum °F (°C)	65.8 (18.8)	72.2 (22.3)	80.2 (26.8)	85.9 (29.9)	92.0 (33.3)	98.4 (36.9)	102.9 (39.4)	102.2 (39.0)	97.6 (36.4)	88.8 (31.6)	76.7 (24.8)	66.1 (18.9)	104.3 (40.2)
Mean daily maximum °F (°C)	43.7 (6.5)	48.5 (9.2)	58.7 (14.8)	68.0 (20.0)	76.8 (24.9)	86.7 (30.4)	91.8 (33.2)	90.5 (32.5)	82.8 (28.2)	71.0 (21.7)	57.1 (13.9)	45.4 (7.4)	68.4 (20.2)
Daily mean °F (°C)	32.9 (0.5)	36.9 (2.7)	46.5 (8.1)	55.4 (13.0)	65.6 (18.7)	75.6 (24.2)	80.5 (26.9)	79.1 (26.2)	71.0 (21.7)	58.8 (14.9)	45.7 (7.6)	35.3 (1.8)	56.9 (13.9)
Mean daily minimum °F (°C)	22.0 (−5.6)	25.2 (−3.8)	34.4 (1.3)	42.8 (6.0)	54.3 (12.4)	64.5 (18.1)	69.3 (20.7)	67.7 (19.8)	59.2 (15.1)	46.7 (8.2)	34.4 (1.3)	25.1 (−3.8)	45.5 (7.5)
Mean minimum °F (°C)	5.9 (−14.5)	8.7 (−12.9)	16.7 (−8.5)	27.7 (−2.4)	39.8 (4.3)	53.2 (11.8)	61.1 (16.2)	57.8 (14.3)	44.7 (7.1)	29.9 (−1.2)	18.3 (−7.6)	9.7 (−12.4)	2.0 (−16.7)
Record low °F (°C)	−19 (−28)	−20 (−29)	−4 (−20)	12 (−11)	24 (−4)	40 (4)	46 (8)	41 (5)	28 (−2)	12 (−11)	3 (−16)	−15 (−26)	−20 (−29)
Average precipitation inches (mm)	0.96 (24)	1.34 (34)	2.48 (63)	3.14 (80)	5.27 (134)	5.19 (132)	4.03 (102)	4.25 (108)	3.09 (78)	3.28 (83)	1.78 (45)	1.33 (34)	36.14 (917)
Average snowfall inches (cm)	2.6 (6.6)	2.0 (5.1)	1.5 (3.8)	0.0 (0.0)	0.0 (0.0)	0.0 (0.0)	0.0 (0.0)	0.0 (0.0)	0.0 (0.0)	0.0 (0.0)	0.3 (0.76)	2.8 (7.1)	9.2 (23.36)
Average precipitation days (≥ 0.01 in)	4.2	5.2	7.0	8.0	9.9	8.9	7.9	8.2	6.5	6.5	4.7	4.8	81.8
Average snowy days (≥ 0.1 in)	1.6	1.5	0.7	0.0	0.0	0.0	0.0	0.0	0.0	0.1	0.2	1.6	5.7
Source 1: NOAA
Source 2: National Weather Service

== Demographics ==
Historical population
Census	Pop.	Note	%±
1880	2,094		—
1890	4,391		109.7%
1900	4,245		−3.3%
1910	7,034		65.7%
1920	7,048		0.2%
1930	7,405		5.1%
1940	7,246		−2.1%
1950	7,747		6.9%
1960	8,809		13.7%
1970	8,072		−8.4%
1980	8,212		1.7%
1990	8,411		2.4%
2000	8,647		2.8%
2010	8,172		−5.5%
2020	7,715		−5.6%
2023 (est.)	7,568		−1.9%
U.S. Decennial Census; 2010-2020

=== 2020 census ===
As of the 2020 census, Wellington had a population of 7,715. The median age was 38.8 years. 25.9% of residents were under the age of 18 and 19.2% of residents were 65 years of age or older. For every 100 females there were 97.3 males, and for every 100 females age 18 and over there were 95.0 males age 18 and over.

95.8% of residents lived in urban areas, while 4.2% lived in rural areas.

There were 3,170 households in Wellington, of which 29.4% had children under the age of 18 living in them. Of all households, 40.9% were married-couple households, 22.1% were households with a male householder and no spouse or partner present, and 29.5% were households with a female householder and no spouse or partner present. About 34.7% of all households were made up of individuals and 15.9% had someone living alone who was 65 years of age or older. There were 1,906 families, and the average household size was 2.4 while the average family size was 3.0.

There were 3,690 housing units, of which 14.1% were vacant. The homeowner vacancy rate was 3.3% and the rental vacancy rate was 12.6%.

Racial composition as of the 2020 census
Race	Number	Percent
White	6,624	85.9%
Black or African American	142	1.8%
American Indian and Alaska Native	99	1.3%
Asian	43	0.6%
Native Hawaiian and Other Pacific Islander	0	0.0%
Some other race	201	2.6%
Two or more races	606	7.9%
Hispanic or Latino (of any race)	685	8.9%

Income and poverty

The 2016–2020 5-year American Community Survey estimates show that the median household income was $48,279 (with a margin of error of +/- $6,293) and the median family income $62,714 (+/- $5,998). Males had a median income of $36,052 (+/- $5,505) versus $25,179 (+/- $2,487) for females. The median income for those above 16 years old was $28,048 (+/- $3,535). Approximately, 12.0% of families and 14.7% of the population were below the poverty line, including 14.6% of those under the age of 18 and 15.5% of those ages 65 or over.

=== 2010 census ===
As of the 2010 United States census, there were 8,172 people, 3,246 households, and 2,105 families living in the city. The population density was 1,073.9 inhabitants per square mile (414.6/km^{2}). There were 3,736 housing units at an average density of 490.9 per square mile (189.5/km^{2}). The racial makeup of the city was 91.0% White, 1.7% African American, 1.5% Native American, 0.3% Asian, 2.0% from other races, and 3.5% from two or more races. Hispanic or Latino of any race were 8.3% of the population.

There were 3,246 households, of which 33.2% had children under the age of 18 living with them, 47.0% were married couples living together, 12.1% had a female householder with no husband present, 5.7% had a male householder with no wife present, and 35.2% were non-families. 30.6% of all households were made up of individuals, and 14% had someone living alone who was 65 years of age or older. The average household size was 2.44 and the average family size was 3.03.

The median age in the city was 37.7 years. 27.2% of residents were under the age of 18; 7.3% were between the ages of 18 and 24; 23.2% were from 25 to 44; 26.1% were from 45 to 64; and 16.1% were 65 years of age or older. The gender makeup of the city was 48.7% male and 51.3% female.

== Economy ==
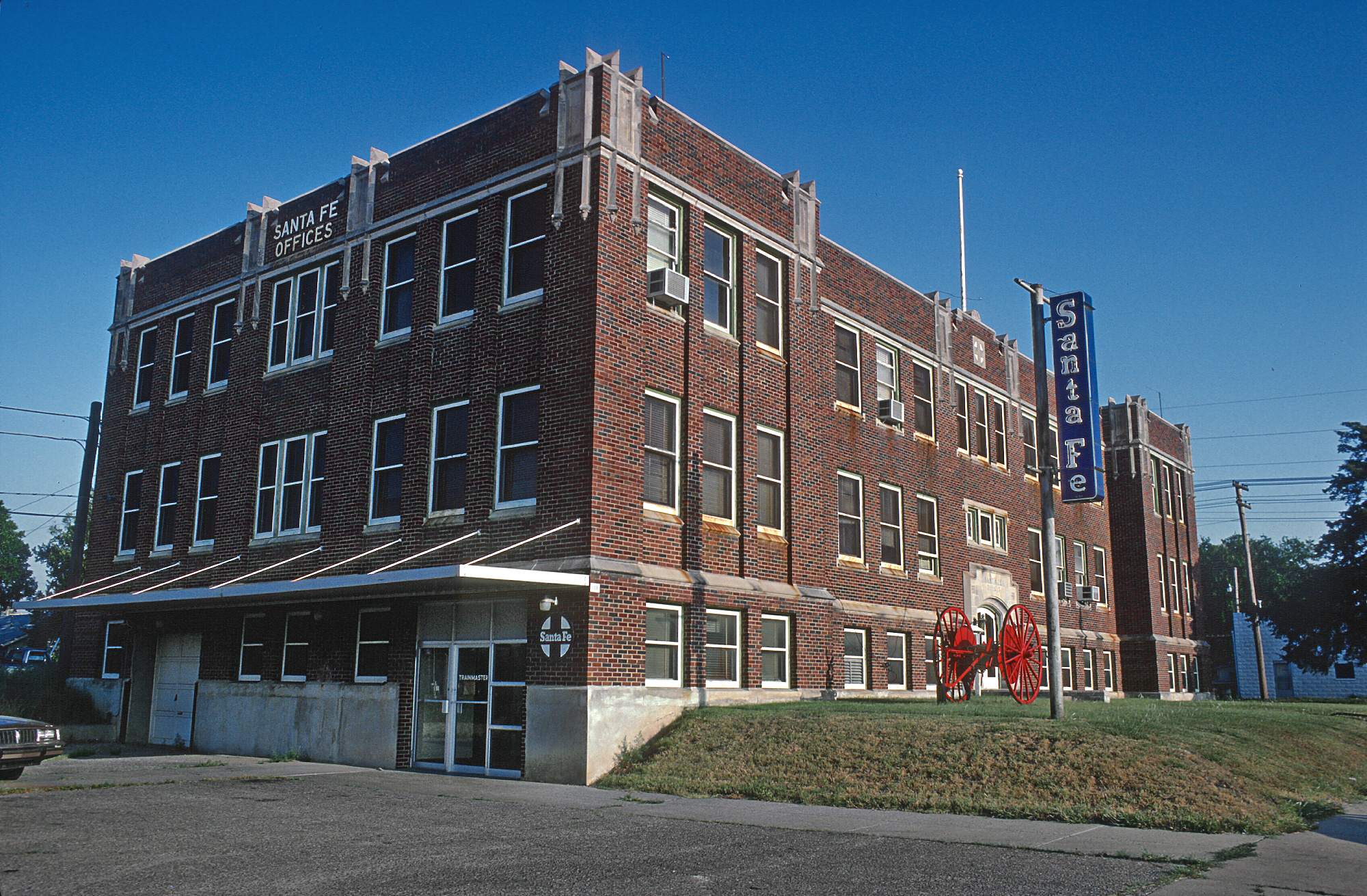
AT&SF Offices (1983)

The surrounding region produced large amounts of winter wheat which was the mainstay of the local economy as of 1997. Railroads, petroleum, and aircraft parts manufacturing are other important businesses.

== Notable places ==
- Downtown Wellington Historic District
- Wellington Carnegie Library
- H.F. Smith House

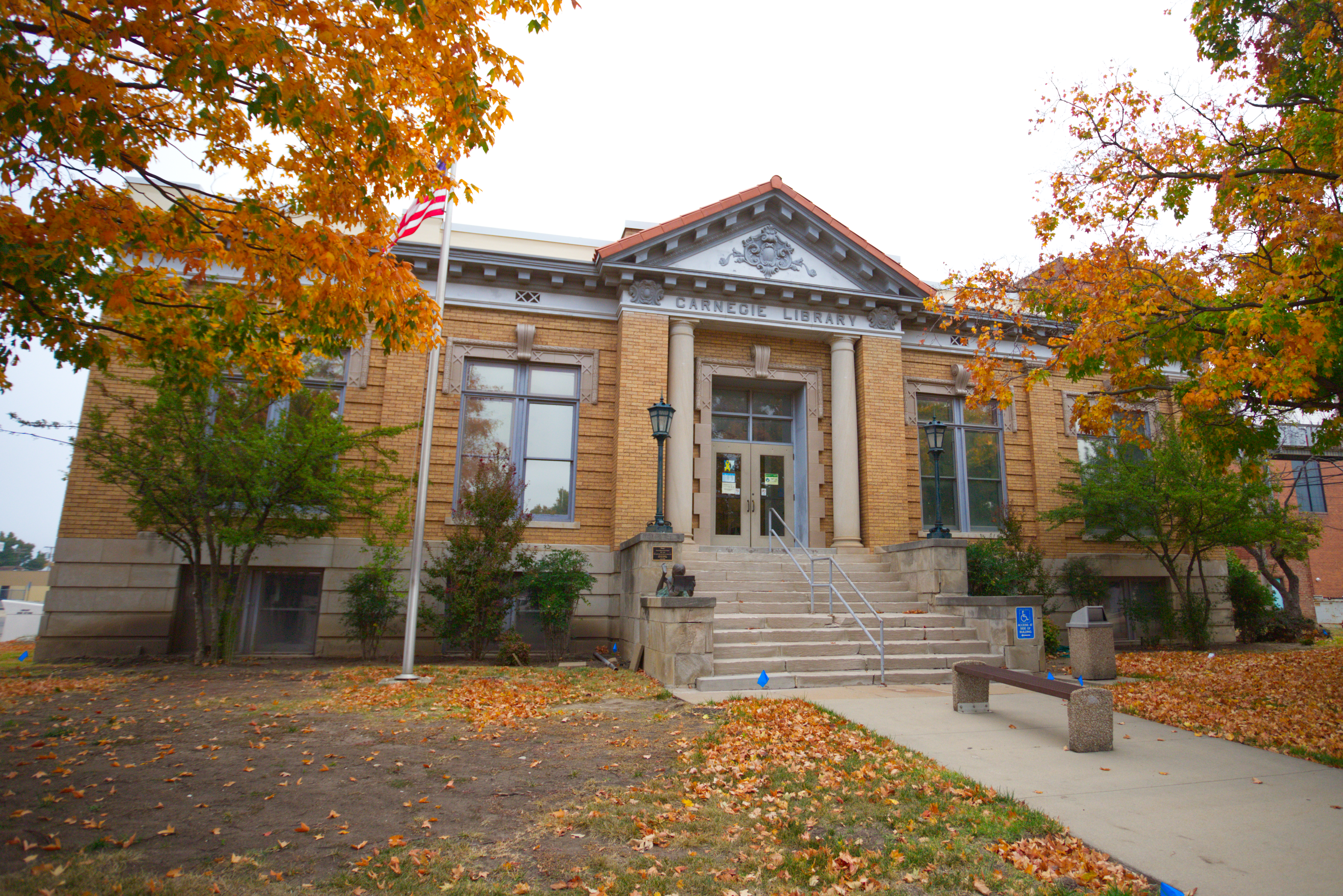
Wellington Public Library (2020)

== Education ==
The community is served by Wellington USD 353 public school district.

== Media ==
Wellington is also home to the Wellington Daily News.

== Transportation ==
The Chicago, Rock Island and Pacific Railroad formerly provided passenger rail service to Wellington on their mainline from Minneapolis to Houston until at least 1961. As of 2025, the nearest passenger rail station is located in Newton, where Amtrak's Southwest Chief stops once daily on a route from Chicago to Los Angeles.

As for rail freight, the BNSF Railway, Union Pacific Railway, and the Land Rush Rail Corporation (previously the Blackwell Northern Gateway Railroad), all have rail connections at or around Wellington.

Wellington is served by U.S. Route 81 and U.S. Route 160, and is just west of Interstate 35.

Wellington Municipal Airport is just north of town.

== Notable people ==
- Ernie Barrett, Professional basketball player for the Boston Celtics.
- Ara Bartlett, lawyer and judge. Second Chief Justice of the Supreme Court of the Dakota Territory.
- Ryleigh Buck, softball player on the United States women's national baseball team at the 2015 Pan American games in Toronto, Canada.
- David Carradine, American actor and film director lived in Wellington for around a year in the early 1980s
- Arthur S. Champeny, United States Army officer
- Mardie Cornejo, Major League Baseball player for the New York Mets.
- Nate Cornejo, Major League Baseball player for the Detroit Tigers.
- Mabel Cory Costigan, child labor law advocate, served on advisory council of the National Child Labor Committee
- Sue Jean Covacevich, artist
- Walter Chrysler, founder of the Chrysler Corporation
- Todd Diacon, president of Kent State University.
- Maurice Elder, 26th pick in the 1937 NFL Draft by the Boston Redskins.
- Phil Ferguson, politician, US Representative from the state of Oklahoma from 1935 to 1941.
- William M. Ferguson, 34th Kansas Attorney General
- Neil Frank, meteorologist and former director of the National Hurricane Center
- Gary Freeman, artist and professor emeritus at Indiana University-Purdue University Indianapolis.
- Betty Glamann, born in Wellington. She was a harpist, who played with the likes of Spike Jones and Duke Ellington.
- Loren Hibbs, Director of Baseball Operations at Wichita State University
- Francis Heydt, Four time NCAA Champion swimmer
- Robert B. Hood, United States Army officer and namesake of Fort Hood
- B. Everett Jordan, United States Senator from North Carolina.
- Henry P. Larrabee, 49er, and rancher.
- Gordon William Lillie, nicknamed Pawnee Bill, a showman who specialized in Wild West shows partner of Buffalo Bill.
- J. C. Long, Member of the Kansas House of Representatives.
- Joseph E. Maddy, pioneering music educator and founder of the Interlochen Arts Camp
- Chuck Miller, pop and jazz musician
- Minnie Minnich, American politician in the Kansas House of Representatives.
- Jack Mitchell, All-American quarterback at the University of Oklahoma
- Kate Pelham Newcomb, physician
- David L. Payne, American soldier and pioneer
- John Potucek, lawyer, member of the Kansas State Senate, and nominee for Governor of Kansas in 1946 and 1950.
- Bill Rhiley, American politician in the Kansas House of Representatives.
- Montie Rissell, serial killer, born in Wellington.
- Fred Roberts (American football coach), head football coach at the University of Oklahoma.
- Mary Bell Smith (1818–1894), farmer, educator, social reformer, and writer
- Karl Spear, head football coach and athletic director at Baker University.
- Vince Wetta, American politician, Kansas House of Representatives.
- Kent Whealy, activist and journalist, co-founder of the Seed Savers Exchange.
- Ed Willett, Major League Baseball player.
- Zeta V. Wood, singer and vocal teacher, raised in Wellington
- Logan Wright, Former president of the American Psychological Association.
