= Oxford, Kansas =

City in Sumner County, Kansas

- City
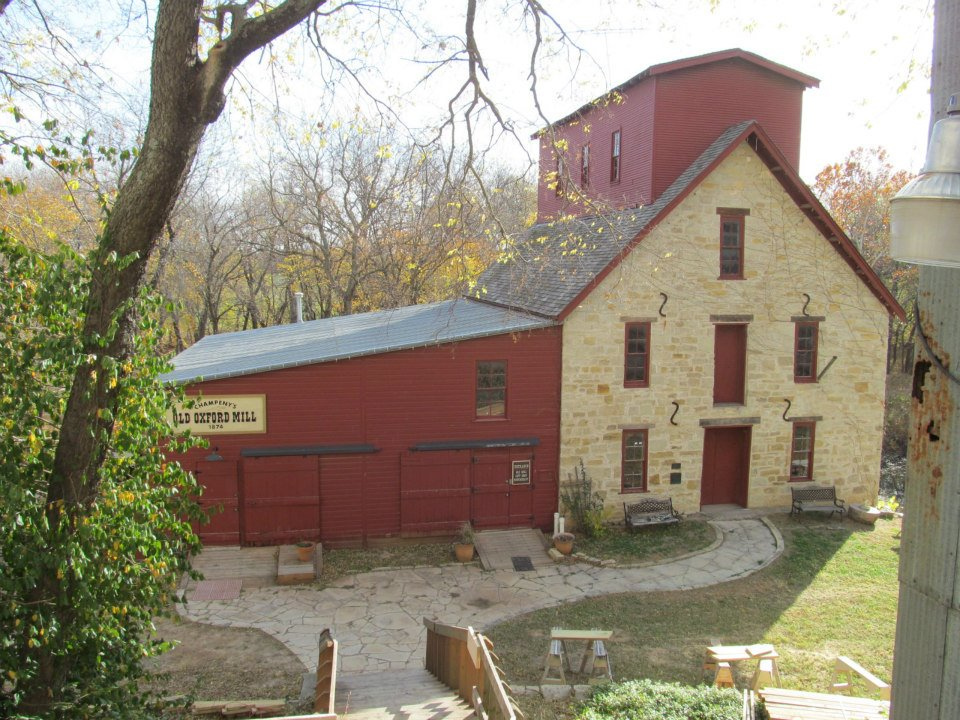
- Old Oxford Mill (2012)

- Location within Sumner County and Kansas

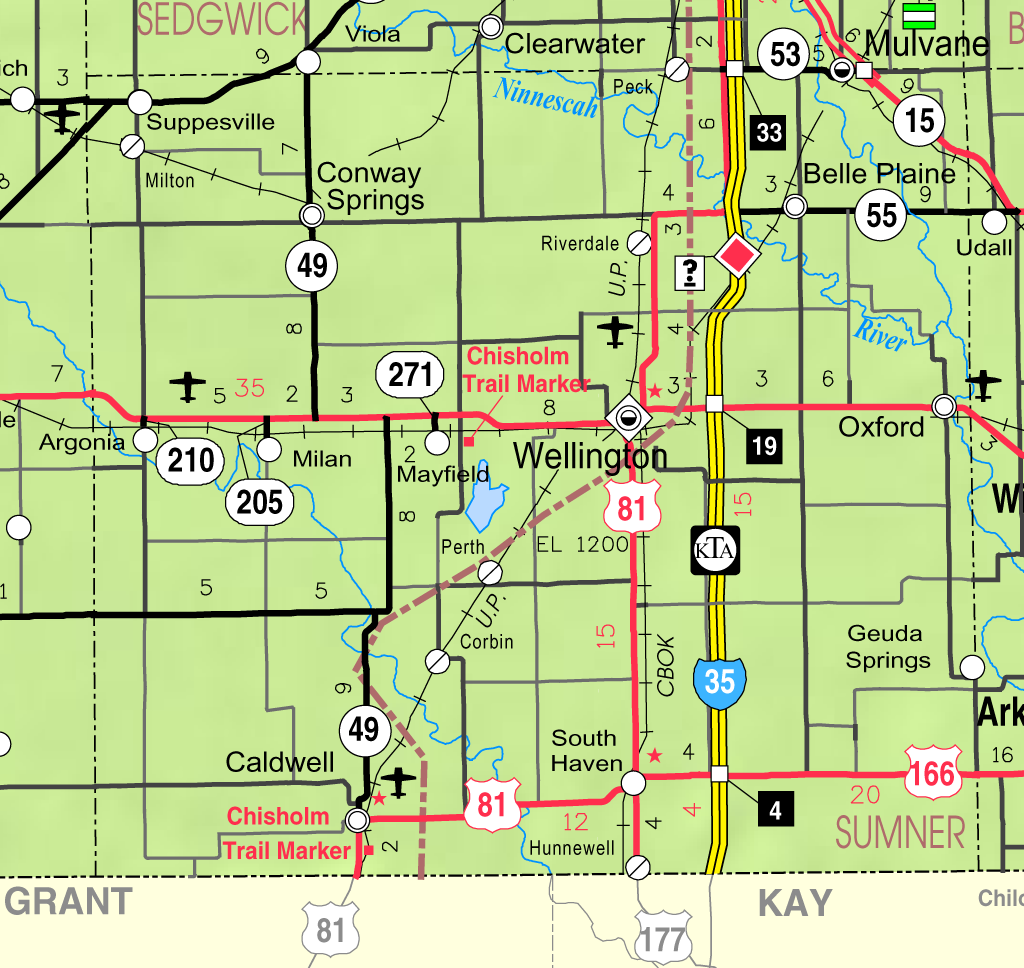
- KDOT map of Sumner County (legend)
- Coordinates: 37°16′26″N 97°10′11″W
- Country: United States
- State: Kansas
- County: Sumner
- Founded: 1871
- Incorporated: 1879
- Named for: Oxford University

Government
  - Mayor: David Olmsted (2022-2026)

Area
  - Total: 0.91 sq mi (2.35 km^{2})
  - Land: 0.91 sq mi (2.35 km^{2})
  - Water: 0 sq mi (0.00 km^{2})
- Elevation: 1,188 ft (362 m)

Population (2020)
  - Total: 1,048
  - Density: 1,160/sq mi (446/km^{2})
- Time zone: UTC-6 (CST)
  - Summer (DST): UTC-5 (CDT)
- ZIP Code: 67119
- Area code: 620
- FIPS code: 20-53850
- GNIS ID: 2396118
- Website: oxfordks.org

Oxford is a city in Sumner County, Kansas, United States. As of the 2020 census, the population of the city was 1,048.

== History ==
Oxford was founded in 1871 at the site of a former trading post. Oxford was incorporated as a city on October 17, 1879. It was named after Oxford University, in England. The founding city officials were Ben Smith (1831–1898), the elected mayor, Joseph Sleigh (1842–1924), the elected police judge and George Walton (1820–1902), the appointed city clerk.

When Oxford was known as Napawalla, a post office had been established and Lafe Binkley (1842–1917) was postmaster. When Oxford was founded, a new post office was opened and T.E. Clark was appointed postmaster.

== Geography ==
According to the United States Census Bureau, the city has a total area of 0.83 square miles (2.15 km^{2}), all land. It is located approximately thirty miles south of Wichita.

=== Climate ===
The climate in this area is characterized by hot, humid summers and generally mild to cool winters. According to the Köppen Climate Classification system, Oxford has a humid subtropical climate, abbreviated "Cfa" on climate maps.

== Demographics ==
Historical population
Census	Pop.	Note	%±
1880	403		—
1890	665		65.0%
1900	567		−14.7%
1910	624		10.1%
1920	748		19.9%
1930	1,129		50.9%
1940	1,020		−9.7%
1950	798		−21.8%
1960	989		23.9%
1970	1,113		12.5%
1980	1,125		1.1%
1990	1,143		1.6%
2000	1,173		2.6%
2010	1,049		−10.6%
2020	1,048		−0.1%
U.S. Decennial Census

=== 2020 census ===
The 2020 United States census counted 1,048 people, 444 households, and 269 families in Oxford. The population density was 1,156.7 per square mile (446.6/km^{2}). There were 479 housing units at an average density of 528.7 per square mile (204.1/km^{2}). The racial makeup was 88.93% (932) white or European American (85.31% non-Hispanic white), 0.86% (9) black or African-American, 0.19% (2) Native American or Alaska Native, 0.29% (3) Asian, 0.0% (0) Pacific Islander or Native Hawaiian, 0.95% (10) from other races, and 8.78% (92) from two or more races. Hispanic or Latino of any race was 6.58% (69) of the population.

Of the 444 households, 26.4% had children under the age of 18; 47.7% were married couples living together; 25.0% had a female householder with no spouse or partner present. 36.0% of households consisted of individuals and 17.3% had someone living alone who was 65 years of age or older. The average household size was 2.4 and the average family size was 3.0. The percent of those with a bachelor's degree or higher was estimated to be 14.9% of the population.

22.4% of the population was under the age of 18, 5.5% from 18 to 24, 20.0% from 25 to 44, 27.7% from 45 to 64, and 24.3% who were 65 years of age or older. The median age was 46.9 years. For every 100 females, there were 103.9 males. For every 100 females ages 18 and older, there were 107.9 males.

The 2016–2020 5-year American Community Survey estimates show that the median household income was $47,875 (with a margin of error of +/- $23,030) and the median family income was $79,583 (+/- $7,399). Males had a median income of $41,875 (+/- $8,390) versus $31,220 (+/- $6,251) for females. The median income for those above 16 years old was $34,055 (+/- $5,476). Approximately, 6.7% of families and 13.8% of the population were below the poverty line, including 18.1% of those under the age of 18 and 9.0% of those ages 65 or over.

=== 2010 census ===
As of the census of 2010, there were 1,049 people, 434 households, and 292 families residing in the city. The population density was 1,263.9 inhabitants per square mile (488.0/km^{2}). There were 484 housing units at an average density of 583.1 per square mile (225.1/km^{2}). The racial makeup of the city was 94.9% White, 1.0% African American, 1.1% Native American, 0.4% Asian, 0.7% from other races, and 1.9% from two or more races. Hispanic or Latino of any race were 2.2% of the population.

There were 434 households, of which 27.4% had children under the age of 18 living with them, 56.2% were married couples living together, 8.1% had a female householder with no husband present, 3.0% had a male householder with no wife present, and 32.7% were non-families. 30.0% of all households were made up of individuals, and 12.4% had someone living alone who was 65 years of age or older. The average household size was 2.32 and the average family size was 2.83.

The median age in the city was 44.7 years. 21.9% of residents were under the age of 18; 6.7% were between the ages of 18 and 24; 22.1% were from 25 to 44; 29.7% were from 45 to 64; and 19.5% were 65 years of age or older. The gender makeup of the city was 48.7% male and 51.3% female.

=== 2000 census ===
As of the census of 2000, there were 1,173 people, 465 households, and 327 families residing in the city. The population density was 1,401.8 inhabitants per square mile (541.2/km^{2}). There were 503 housing units at an average density of 601.1 per square mile (232.1/km^{2}). The racial makeup of the city was 95.99% White, 0.09% African American, 1.71% Native American, 0.17% Asian, 0.26% from other races, and 1.79% from two or more races. Hispanic or Latino of any race were 1.28% of the population.

There were 465 households, out of which 33.8% had children under the age of 18 living with them, 57.0% were married couples living together, 11.0% had a female householder with no husband present, and 29.5% were non-families. 28.6% of all households were made up of individuals, and 15.3% had someone living alone who was 65 years of age or older. The average household size was 2.43 and the average family size was 2.95.

In the city, the population was spread out, with 25.7% under the age of 18, 6.2% from 18 to 24, 26.5% from 25 to 44, 20.5% from 45 to 64, and 21.1% who were 65 years of age or older. The median age was 40 years. For every 100 females, there were 87.1 males. For every 100 females age 18 and over, there were 79.8 males.

The median income for a household in the city was $34,875, and the median income for a family was $42,500. Males had a median income of $36,250 versus $22,841 for females. The per capita income for the city was $16,479. About 4.3% of families and 5.8% of the population were below the poverty line, including 9.0% of those under age 18 and 1.9% of those age 65 or over.

== Area attractions ==
- The Old Oxford Mill, near Oxford, build in 1875
- Napawalla Park
- Cave Park
- The Oxford Watermelon Feed, takes place the first Saturday after Labor Day in September

== Education ==
The community is served by Oxford USD 358 public school district.

- Oxford Jr/Sr High School, 515 N Water St.

Oxford High School has produced several championship sports teams recently: district champions in football, regional champions in baseball, and tournament champions in basketball. Oxford High School has also produced academic Scholar's Bowl teams that have gone to state, in which it took 2nd place in 2008 and 4th in 2014.

== Notable people ==
- Keitha Adams, (b 1967), current UTEP Miners women's basketball head coach
- Vingie Roe (1879–1958), American novelist and screenwriter

== See also ==
- 1955 Great Plains tornado outbreak
