= Greene Township, Kansas =

Township in Sumner County, Kansas, U.S.

Greene Township
- Township
- Location within Sumner County
- Coordinates: 37.175022°N 97.307237°W
- Country: United States
- State: Kansas
- County: Sumner
- Established: 1879

Government
  - Trustee: John Larsen

Area
  - Total: 35.926 sq mi (93.05 km^{2})
  - Land: 35.889 sq mi (92.95 km^{2})
  - Water: 0.037 sq mi (0.096 km^{2}) 0.10%

Population (2020)
  - Total: 79
  - Density: 2.2/sq mi (0.85/km^{2})
- Time zone: UTC-6 (CST)
  - Summer (DST): UTC-5 (CDT)
- Area code: 620
- GNIS feature ID: 470326

Greene Township is a township in Sumner County, Kansas, United States. As of the 2020 census, its population was 79.

== History ==
Greene Township was established in 1879 from parts of Avon Township and Guelph Township.

== Geography ==
Greene Township covers an area of 35.926 square miles (93.05 km^{2}), with 0.10% of it being water. Slate Creek and Antelope Creek flow though it.

=== Adjacent townships ===
Avon Township, Sumner County
Wellington Township, Sedgwick County	northwest	north	northeast	Oxford Township, Sumner County
Jackson Township, Sumner County	west	self	east	Valverde Township, Sumner County
South Haven Township, Sumner County	southwest	south	southeast	Walton Township, Sumner County
Guelph Township, Sumner County

== Transportation ==
=== Major highways ===
- I-35 / Kansas Turnpike

== Demographics ==
As of the 2020 census, the township had a population of 79, giving a population density of 2.2 people per square mile (0.85 people/km^{2}).
