= Palestine Township, Kansas =

Township in Sumner County, Kansas, U.S.

Palestine Township
- Township
- Location within Sumner County
- Coordinates: 37.35693°N 97.218281°W
- Country: United States
- State: Kansas
- County: Sumner
- Established: 1872

Government
  - Trustee: Jeff Hatfield

Area
  - Total: 28.362 sq mi (73.46 km^{2})
  - Land: 28.006 sq mi (72.54 km^{2})
  - Water: 0.356 sq mi (0.92 km^{2}) 1.26%

Population (2020)
  - Total: 209
  - Density: 7.46/sq mi (2.88/km^{2})
- Time zone: UTC-6 (CST)
  - Summer (DST): UTC-5 (CDT)
- Area code: 316 and 620
- GNIS feature ID: 470131

Palestine Township is a township in Sumner County, Kansas, United States. As of the 2020 census, its population was 209.

== History ==
Palestine Township was established in 1872. Eventually Palestine Township and Gore Township exchanged land on the two sides of the Arkansas River. Palestine Township would also annex a small part of Belle Plaine Township.

== Geography ==
Palestine Township covers an area of 28.362 square miles (73.46 km^{2}), 1.26% of it being water. The Arkansas River and Ninnescah River flow through it, as well as Dry Creek, Cowskin Creek, and Dog Creek.

=== Adjacent townships ===
| Belle Plaine Township, Sumner County | northwest | | northeast | Gore Township, Sumner County |
| Harmon Township, Sumner County | west | self |
| Avon Township, Sumner County | southwest | south |
Oxford Township, Sumner County

== Transportation ==
=== Major highways ===
- K-55

== Demographics ==
As of the 2020 census, the township had a population of 209, giving a population density of 33.06 people per square mile (12.76 people/km^{2}). The racial makeup of the township was 89.5% White, 1.0% Black or African American, 0.5% Native American, 1.0% from some other race, and 8.1% from two or more races. Hispanics or Latinos of any race were 2.9% of the population.

The 2020–2024 American Community Survey estimated that the township contained 89 households and 109 housing units.
