= Gore Township, Kansas =

Township in Sumner County, Kansas, U.S.

Gore Township
- Township
- Location within Sumner County
- Coordinates: 37.426911°N 97.191742°W
- Country: United States
- State: Kansas
- County: Sumner
- Established: 1872

Government
  - Trustee: Terry Rutter

Area
  - Total: 32.418 sq mi (83.96 km^{2})
  - Land: 31.872 sq mi (82.55 km^{2})
  - Water: 0.546 sq mi (1.41 km^{2}) 1.68%

Population (2020)
  - Total: 1,837
  - Density: 57.64/sq mi (22.25/km^{2})
- Time zone: UTC-6 (CST)
  - Summer (DST): UTC-5 (CDT)
- Area code: 316
- GNIS feature ID: 470223

Gore Township is a township in Sumner County, Kansas, United States. As of the 2020 census, its population was 1,837.

== History ==
Gore Township was established in 1872. Part of Gore Township was eventually annexed by Belle Plaine Township.

== Geography ==
Gore Township covers an area of 32.418 square miles (83.96 km^{2}), with 1.68% of it being water. The Arkansas River flows through it, as well as Short Creek, Bitter Creek, and Dog Creek.

=== Communities ===
- part of Mulvane

=== Adjacent townships ===
Rockford Township, Sedgwick County
Salem Township, Sedgwick County	northwest	north	northeast	Richland Township, Butler County
Belle Plaine Township, Sumner County	west	self	east	Maple Township, Cowley County
Palestine Township, Sumner County	southwest	south	southeast	Ninnescah Township, Cowley County
Oxford Township, Sumner County

== Transportation ==
=== Major highways ===
- K-15
- K-53
- K-55

== Demographics ==
As of the 2020 census, the township had a population of 1,837, giving a population density of 57.64 people per square mile (22.25 people/km^{2}). The racial makeup of the township was 90.5% White, 1.5% Native American, 0.7% Black or African American, 0.2% Asian, 0.8% from some other race, and 6.4% from two or more races. Hispanics or Latinos of any race were 4.6% of the population.

The 2020–2024 American Community Survey estimated that the township contained 707 households and 835 housing units.
