= Strother Field =

Strother Field - KWLD (formerly Strother Army Air Field)
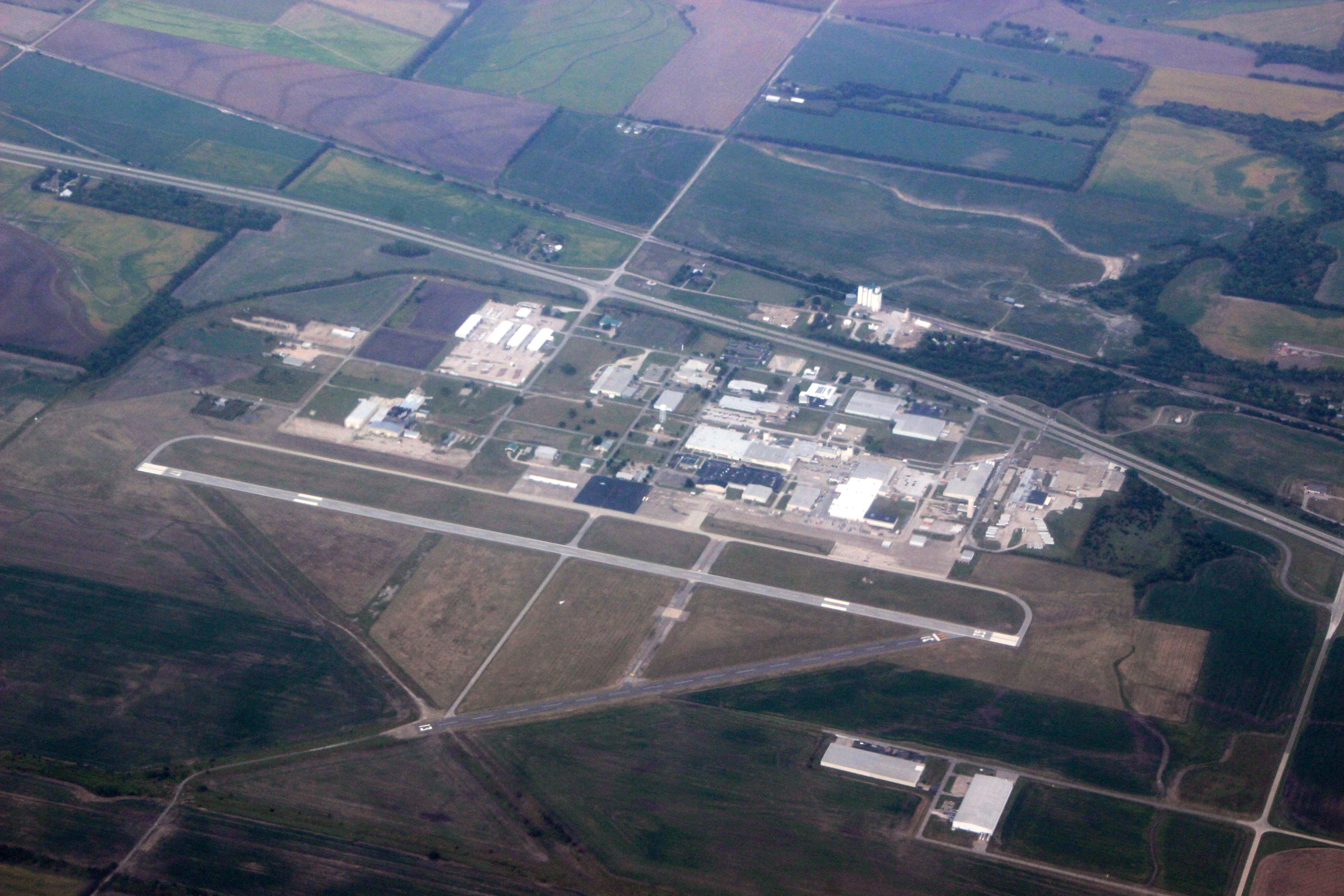
- Looking northeast in 2017
- IATA: WLD; ICAO: KWLD; FAA LID: WLD

Summary
- Airport type: Public
- Owner: Cities of Winfield & Arkansas City
- Serves: Winfield / Arkansas City, Kansas
- Location: Pleasant Valley Township / Beaver Township, Cowley County
- Time zone: Central Standard Time (CST) (UTC - 6, or during DST UTC - 5)
- Elevation AMSL: 1,160 ft (350 m)
- Coordinates: 37°10′07″N 097°02′15″W

Map
- Location within Kansas

Runways
Direction	Length		Surface
Direction	ft	m	Surface
17/35	5,506	1,678	Asphalt
13/31	3,137	956	Asphalt

Statistics (2021)
- Aircraft operations (year ending 5/21/2021): 6,500
- Based aircraft: 18
- Source: Federal Aviation Administration

Strother Field (IATA: WLD, ICAO: KWLD, FAA LID: WLD) is a public airport in Cowley County, Kansas, six miles southwest of Winfield and north of Arkansas City. The airport is jointly owned by the two cities. The National Plan of Integrated Airport Systems for 2011–2015 categorized it as a general aviation facility.

== History ==
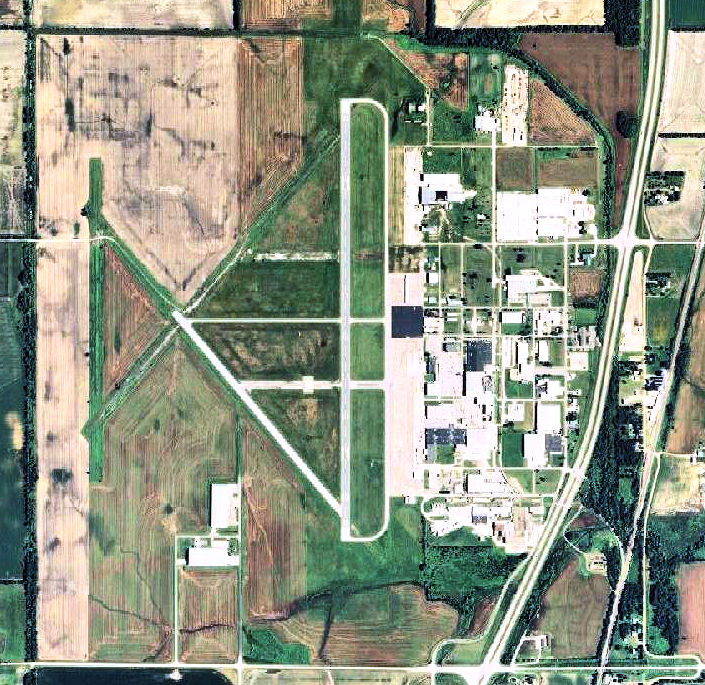
2006 orthophoto of Strother Field

- Strother Field Tetrahedron Wind Indicator
- U.S. National Register of Historic Places
- Location: 22215 Tupper St., Winfield, Kansas
- Area: Less than one acre
- NRHP reference No.: 15000143
- Added to NRHP: April 14, 2015

An airport, jointly owned by Arkansas City and Winfield, was under construction in April 1942 when the United States Army Air Forces indicated a need for a training airfield by the Army Air Forces Flying Training Command, Gulf Coast Training Center. Strother Army Airfield was rushed to completion with the first class of cadets scheduled to arrive for basic training in Vultee BT-13 Valiant aircraft on December 14, 1942. It played a role in the World War II Battle of Kansas.

Military use of Strother Field ended in October 1945 and it was turned over for civil use. Today, the site is Strother Field and Industrial Park. Remaining wartime structures include the runways, two hangars, two link training buildings, a tetrahedron wind cone, two ruins sites and a building of unknown original use.

The airport is named for Donald Root Strother, the first Army Air Corps pilot from Cowley County, Kansas to lose his life in World War II. His older brother Dean C. Strother became a four-star general in the United States Air Force.

Winfield had scheduled Central Airlines flights in 1950–53. on Bonanzas, then DC-3s.

The Strother Field Tetrahedron Wind Indicator was listed on the National Register of Historic Places in 2015.

== Facilities ==
Strother Field covers 1,656 acres (670 ha) at an elevation of 1,160 feet (354 m). It has two asphalt runways: 17/35 is 5,506 by 100 feet (1,678 x 30 m) and 13/31 is 3,137 by 75 feet (956 x 23 m).

Strother field's industrial park includes a jet engine maintenance and manufacturing facility for GE Aviation.

In the year ending May 21, 2021, the airport had 6,500 general aviation aircraft operations, average 125 per week. 18 aircraft were then based at the airport: all single-engine.

== See also ==
- List of airports in Kansas
