= Hooser, Kansas =

Unincorporated community in Cowley County, Kansas

Hooser is an unincorporated community in Dexter Township, Cowley County, Kansas, United States. It is located at 37°08′18″N 96°37′48″W.

== History ==
A post office was opened in Hooser in 1887, and remained in operation until it was discontinued in 1944.

Hooser was a station on the Missouri Pacific Railroad. In 1910, it contained a population of 23.

== Education ==
The community is served by Dexter USD 471 public school district.
