= Cowley County, Kansas =

County in Kansas, United States

- County
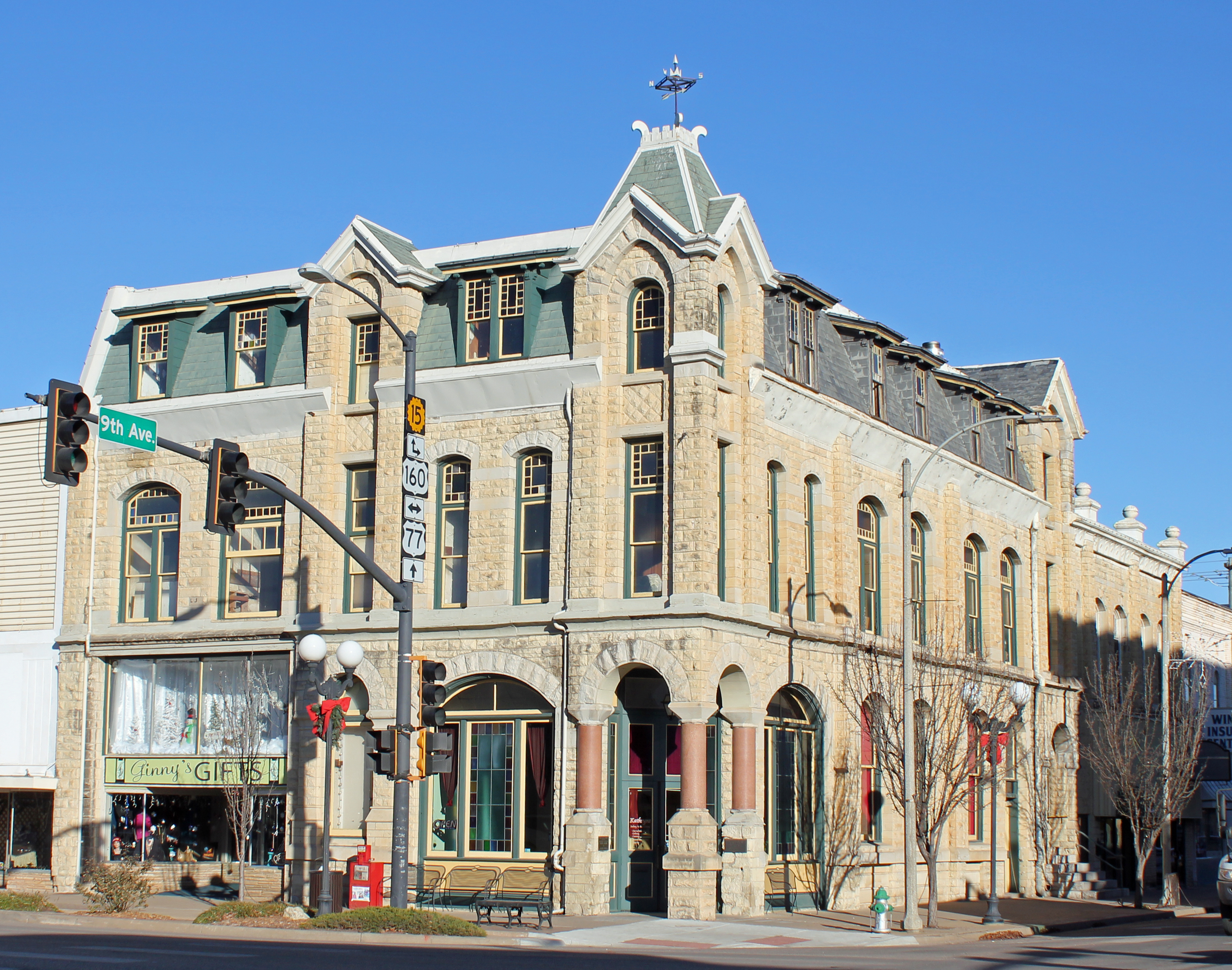
- Cowley County National Bank Building (2013)

- Location within the U.S. state of Kansas
- Coordinates: 37°14′N 96°50′W
- Country: United States
- State: Kansas
- Founded: February 26, 1867
- Named for: Matthew Cowley
- Seat: Winfield
- Largest city: Arkansas City

Area
  - Total: 1,132 sq mi (2,930 km^{2})
  - Land: 1,126 sq mi (2,920 km^{2})
  - Water: 6.7 sq mi (17 km^{2}) 0.6%

Population (2020)
  - Total: 34,549
  - Estimate (2025): 34,382 ▼
  - Density: 30.68/sq mi (11.85/km^{2})
- Time zone: UTC−6 (Central)
  - Summer (DST): UTC−5 (CDT)
- Area code: 620
- Congressional district: 4th
- Website: www.cowleycountyks.gov

Cowley County is a county located in the U.S. state of Kansas. Its county seat is Winfield, and its most populous city is Arkansas City. As of the 2020 census, the county population was 34,549. The county was named after Matthew Cowley, first lieutenant in Company I, 9th Kansas Cavalry, who died during the Civil War.

== History ==
For millennia, the land now known as Kansas was inhabited by Native Americans. The first European visitor to Kansas was the Spanish explorer Francisco Vasquez de Coronado in 1541. In 1601, the Governor of New Mexico, Juan de Oñate, visited Etzanoa, a settlement of several thousand Wichita people near Arkansas City along the Walnut River. The ruins of Etzanoa have been found by archaeologists.

=== 19th century ===
In 1803, most of modern Kansas was secured by the United States as part of the Louisiana Purchase. In 1854, the Kansas Territory was organized, then in 1861 Kansas became the 34th U.S. state. Cowley County was officially organized as a county, but reserved for the Osage Indians, by the Kansas Legislature in March 1867, originally named Hunter County for Robert Mercer Taliaferro Hunter (1809–1887), a Virginia Representative and Senator to Congress and Speaker of the House in the twenty-sixth Congress. In 1870, the county was renamed for Matthew Cowley, First Lieutenant in Company I, 9th Kansas Cavalry, who died at Little Rock, Arkansas, on October 7, 1864. Officially opened for settlement July 15, 1870, there was a lengthy and bitter disagreement between the towns of Winfield and Cresswell (the town now named Arkansas City) over the possession of the county seat of government. Finally settled after two special elections and numerous petitions to the Governor and Legislature, Winfield was determined to be the county seat and a courthouse was constructed in 1873 at a cost of $11,500.

=== 21st century ===
In 2010, the Keystone-Cushing Pipeline (Phase II) was constructed north to south through Cowley County. Controversy arose from the Kansas legislature's decision to grant the pipeline a ten-year exemption from property taxes; it was estimated that this would mean $15 million per year in lost revenue to the six counties through which the pipeline passed. The counties were unsuccessful in an attempt to eliminate the exemption.

== Geography ==
According to the U.S. Census Bureau, the county has a total area of 1,132 square miles (2,930 km^{2}), of which 1,126 square miles (2,920 km^{2}) is land and 6.7 square miles (17 km^{2}) (0.6%) is water.

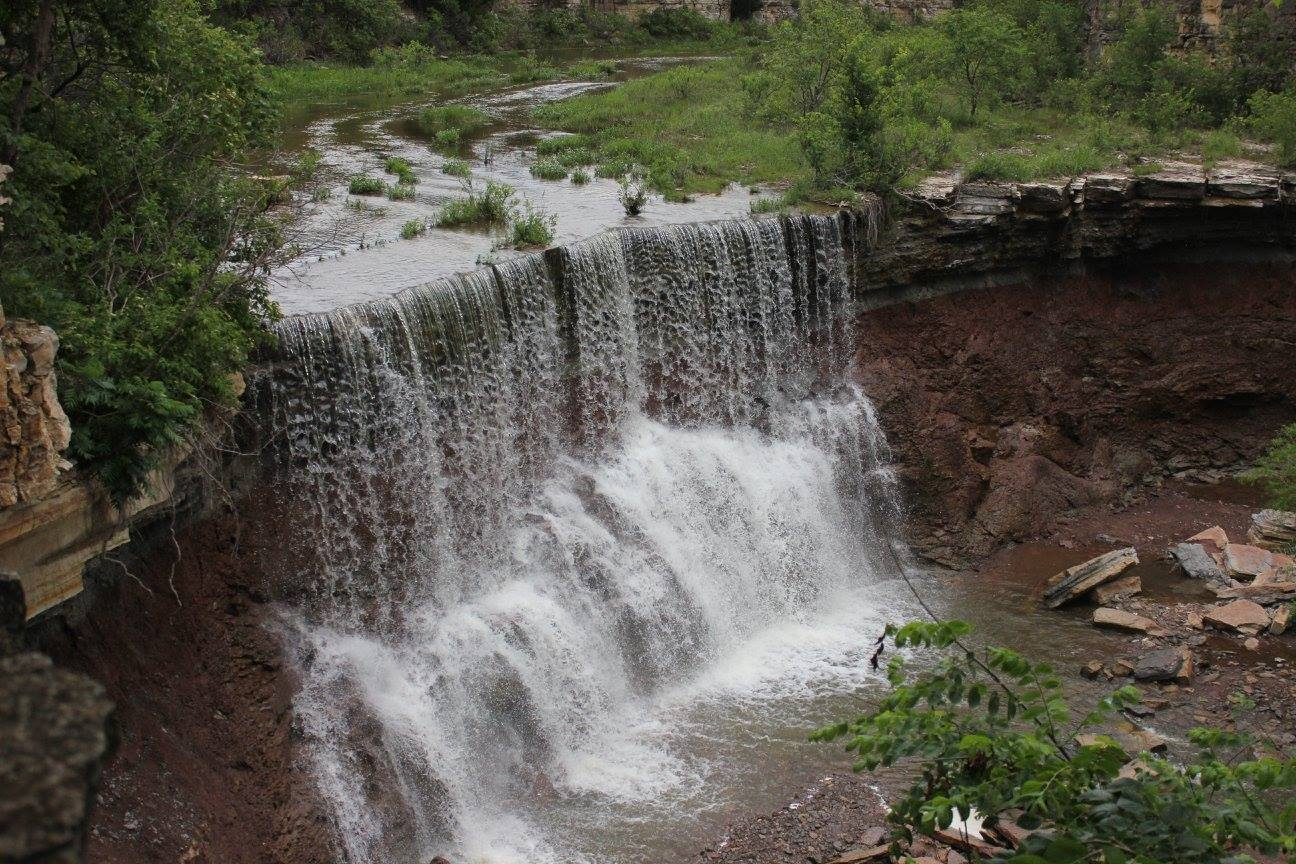
Waterfall located in the Cowley County Fishing Lake - Year 2016

West of Dexter, KS, Cowley County Fishing Lake is positioned just off of Highway 166. This fishing lake is the home of the Cowley County Waterfall, which can be visited following the road to the northwest side of the property. However, in recent years (as of 2021) the severe drought has caused the waterfall to stop flowing. It will likely continue if the area receives enough precipitation and ends the drought.

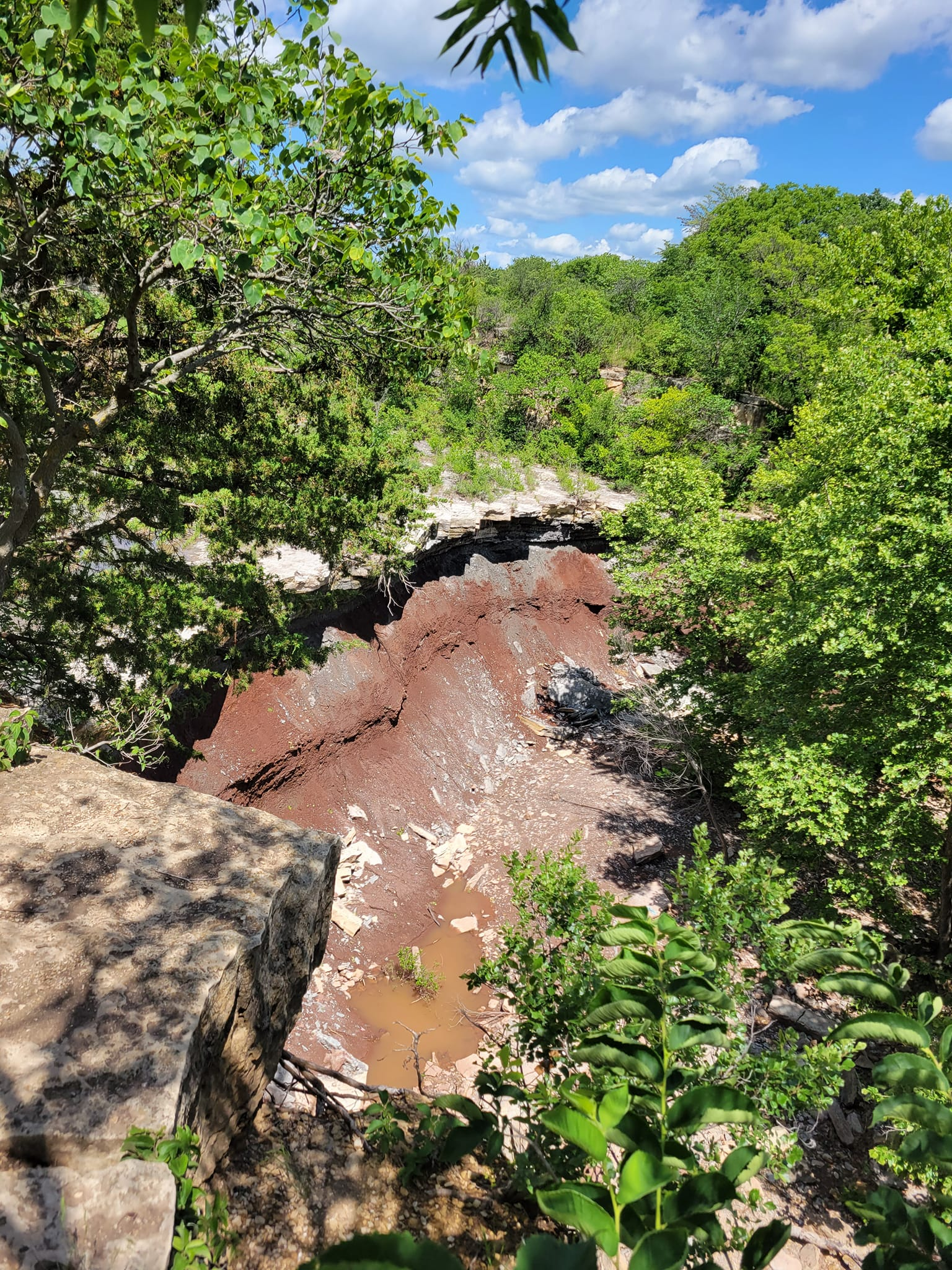
Waterfall base (not flowing) located in the Cowley County Fishing Lake - 2023

=== Adjacent counties ===
- Butler County (north)
- Elk County (northeast)
- Chautauqua County (east)
- Osage County, Oklahoma (south)
- Kay County, Oklahoma (southwest)
- Sumner County (west)
- Sedgwick County (northwest)

== Demographics ==
Historical population
Census	Pop.	Note	%±
1860	158		—
1870	1,175		643.7%
1880	21,538		1,733.0%
1890	34,478		60.1%
1900	30,156		−12.5%
1910	31,790		5.4%
1920	35,155		10.6%
1930	40,903		16.4%
1940	38,139		−6.8%
1950	36,905		−3.2%
1960	37,861		2.6%
1970	35,012		−7.5%
1980	36,824		5.2%
1990	36,915		0.2%
2000	36,291		−1.7%
2010	36,311		0.1%
2020	34,549		−4.9%
2025 (est.)	34,382	▼	−0.5%
U.S. Decennial Census; 1790-1960 1900-1990; 1990-2000 2010-2020

Cowley County comprises the Arkansas City-Winfield, KS Micropolitan Statistical Area, which is included in the Wichita-Arkansas City-Winfield, KS Combined Statistical Area.

=== Racial and ethnic composition ===
Cowley County, Kansas – Racial and ethnic composition Note: the US Census treats Hispanic/Latino as an ethnic category. This table excludes Latinos from the racial categories and assigns them to a separate category. Hispanics/Latinos may be of any race.
Race / Ethnicity (NH = Non-Hispanic)	Pop 1980	Pop 1990	Pop 2000	Pop 2010	Pop 2020	% 1980	% 1990	% 2000	% 2010	% 2020
White alone (NH)	34,354	33,789	32,091	29,832	26,227	93.29%	91.53%	88.43%	82.16%	75.91%
Black or African American alone (NH)	884	1,040	971	971	865	2.40%	2.82%	2.68%	2.67%	2.50%
Native American or Alaska Native alone (NH)	545	656	658	644	626	1.48%	1.78%	1.81%	1.77%	1.81%
Asian alone (NH)	97	315	550	578	499	0.26%	0.85%	1.52%	1.59%	1.44%
Native Hawaiian or Pacific Islander alone (NH)	x	x	5	13	179	x	x	0.01%	0.04%	0.52%
Other race alone (NH)	88	18	18	12	73	0.24%	0.05%	0.05%	0.03%	0.21%
Mixed race or Multiracial (NH)	x	x	694	969	2,109	x	x	1.91%	2.67%	6.10%
Hispanic or Latino (any race)	856	1,097	1,304	3,292	3,971	2.32%	2.97%	3.59%	9.07%	11.49%
Total	36,824	36,915	36,291	36,311	34,549	100.00%	100.00%	100.00%	100.00%	100.00%

=== 2020 census ===
As of the 2020 census, the county had a population of 34,549. The median age was 39.0 years. 23.6% of residents were under the age of 18 and 19.0% of residents were 65 years of age or older. For every 100 females there were 101.2 males, and for every 100 females age 18 and over there were 101.2 males age 18 and over. 68.0% of residents lived in urban areas, while 32.0% lived in rural areas.

The racial makeup of the county was 79.3% White, 2.6% Black or African American, 2.3% American Indian and Alaska Native, 1.5% Asian, 0.5% Native Hawaiian and Pacific Islander, 4.1% from some other race, and 9.7% from two or more races. Hispanic or Latino residents of any race comprised 11.5% of the population.

There were 13,322 households in the county, of which 29.5% had children under the age of 18 living with them and 26.0% had a female householder with no spouse or partner present. About 29.8% of all households were made up of individuals and 13.9% had someone living alone who was 65 years of age or older.

There were 15,558 housing units, of which 14.4% were vacant. Among occupied housing units, 66.3% were owner-occupied and 33.7% were renter-occupied. The homeowner vacancy rate was 2.3% and the rental vacancy rate was 13.7%.

=== 2000 census ===
As of the U.S. Census in 2000, there were 36,291 people, 14,039 households, and 9,616 families residing in the county. The population density was 32 inhabitants per square mile (12/km^{2}). There were 15,673 housing units at an average density of 14 per square mile (5.4/km^{2}). The racial makeup of the county was 90.13% White, 2.70% Black or African American, 1.96% Native American, 1.53% Asian, 0.01% Pacific Islander, 1.36% from other races, and 2.30% from two or more races. Hispanic or Latino of any race were 3.59% of the population.

There were 14,039 households, out of which 32.20% had children under the age of 18 living with them, 55.20% were married couples living together, 9.60% had a female householder with no husband present, and 31.50% were non-families. 27.90% of all households were made up of individuals, and 13.20% had someone living alone who was 65 years of age or older. The average household size was 2.46 and the average family size was 3.00.

In the county, the population was spread out, with 26.00% under the age of 18, 9.90% from 18 to 24, 26.00% from 25 to 44, 22.20% from 45 to 64, and 15.90% who were 65 years of age or older. The median age was 37 years. For every 100 females, there were 95.70 males. For every 100 females age 18 and over, there were 94.20 males.

The median income for a household in the county was $34,406, and the median income for a family was $43,636. Males had a median income of $31,703 versus $21,341 for females. The per capita income for the county was $17,509. About 9.20% of families and 12.90% of the population were below the poverty line, including 17.00% of those under age 18 and 11.20% of those age 65 or over.

== Government ==
=== Presidential elections ===
Presidential election results

United States presidential election results for Cowley County, Kansas
Year	Republican		Democratic		Third party(ies)	
Year	No.	%	No.	%	No.	%
1888	4,112	53.41%	1,933	25.11%	1,654	21.48%
1892	3,886	49.13%	0	0.00%	4,023	50.87%
1896	2,871	45.14%	3,410	53.62%	79	1.24%
1900	3,679	50.47%	3,436	47.14%	174	2.39%
1904	3,961	61.33%	1,456	22.54%	1,042	16.13%
1908	2,578	42.42%	2,995	49.28%	505	8.31%
1912	1,113	15.75%	2,539	35.93%	3,414	48.32%
1916	5,297	43.87%	5,962	49.37%	816	6.76%
1920	7,352	59.22%	4,733	38.13%	329	2.65%
1924	8,529	58.51%	3,161	21.68%	2,887	19.81%
1928	12,701	80.79%	2,818	17.93%	202	1.28%
1932	7,657	44.71%	8,681	50.69%	788	4.60%
1936	8,378	43.51%	10,805	56.12%	72	0.37%
1940	9,684	53.99%	8,115	45.25%	136	0.76%
1944	8,453	55.91%	6,577	43.50%	90	0.60%
1948	8,102	52.13%	7,042	45.31%	397	2.55%
1952	11,454	68.13%	5,242	31.18%	116	0.69%
1956	6,734	63.93%	3,753	35.63%	46	0.44%
1960	10,276	61.98%	6,205	37.42%	99	0.60%
1964	7,092	47.93%	7,591	51.30%	114	0.77%
1968	8,070	54.30%	5,014	33.74%	1,777	11.96%
1972	10,332	70.51%	3,592	24.51%	729	4.98%
1976	7,513	50.32%	7,095	47.52%	323	2.16%
1980	8,749	57.14%	5,474	35.75%	1,089	7.11%
1984	10,008	64.99%	5,193	33.72%	198	1.29%
1988	7,778	54.44%	6,186	43.30%	322	2.25%
1992	5,422	34.35%	5,405	34.24%	4,957	31.41%
1996	7,872	50.79%	5,588	36.05%	2,039	13.16%
2000	8,080	56.86%	5,535	38.95%	595	4.19%
2004	9,407	65.11%	4,818	33.35%	222	1.54%
2008	8,492	61.59%	5,012	36.35%	283	2.05%
2012	8,081	63.58%	4,319	33.98%	310	2.44%
2016	8,270	65.53%	3,551	28.14%	800	6.34%
2020	9,656	67.85%	4,273	30.03%	302	2.12%
2024	9,360	69.31%	3,919	29.02%	226	1.67%

=== Laws ===
Following amendment to the Kansas Constitution in 1986, the county remained a prohibition, or "dry", county until 1996, when voters approved the sale of alcoholic liquor by the individual drink without a food sales requirement.

The county voted "No" on the 2022 Kansas abortion referendum, an anti-abortion ballot measure, by 52% to 48% despite backing Donald Trump with 68% of the vote to Joe Biden's 30% in the 2020 presidential election.

== Education ==
=== Colleges ===
- Cowley College
- Southwestern College
- St. John's College (closed in 1986)

=== Unified school districts ===
- Central USD 462
- Udall USD 463
- Winfield USD 465
- Arkansas City USD 470
- Dexter USD 471

== Communities ==
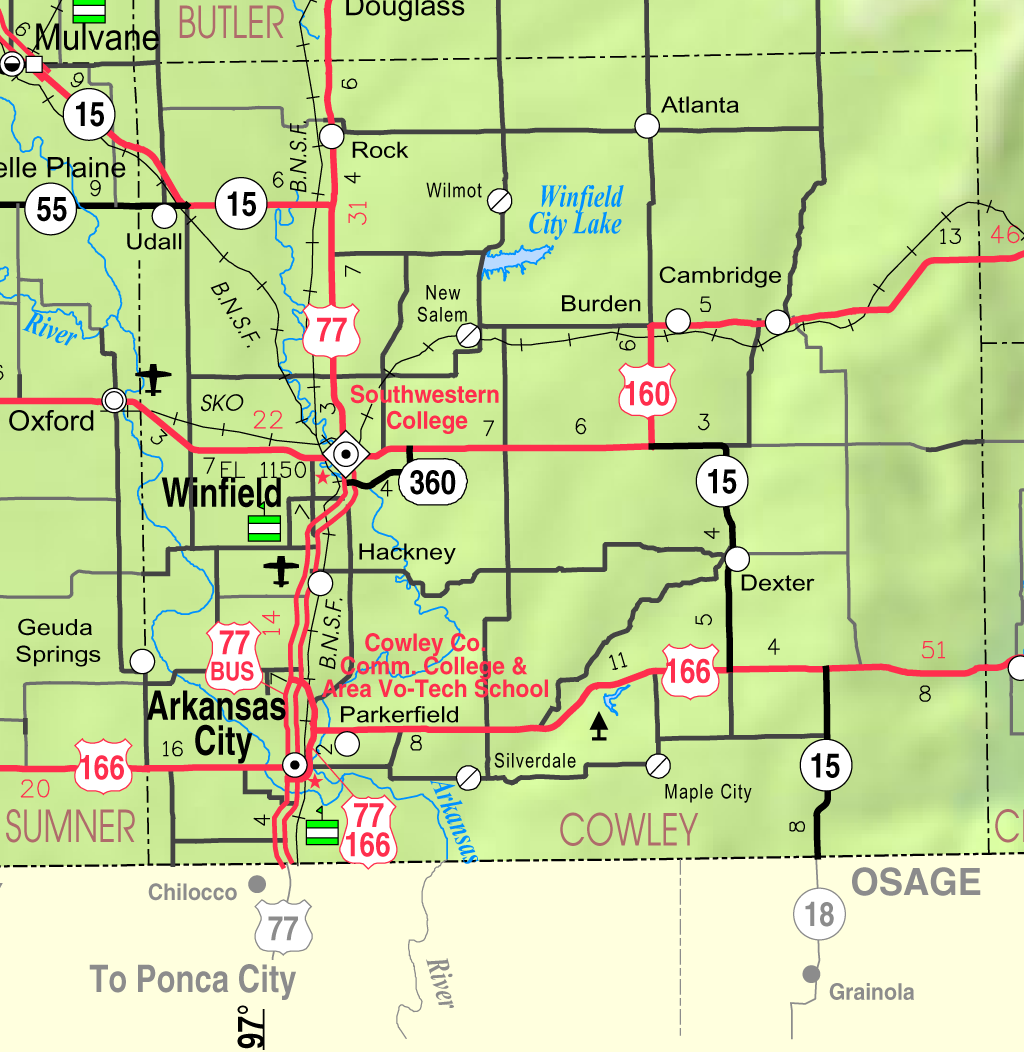
2005 map of Cowley County (map legend)

List of townships / incorporated cities / unincorporated communities / extinct former communities within Cowley County.

=== Cities ===
‡ means a community has portions in an adjacent county.

- Arkansas City
- Atlanta
- Burden
- Cambridge
- Dexter
- Geuda Springs‡
- Parkerfield
- Udall
- Winfield (county seat)

=== Unincorporated communities ===
† means a community is designated a Census-Designated Place (CDP) by the United States Census Bureau.

- Akron / Little Dutch
- Albright
- Box
- Cale
- Cameron / Townsend
- Dale / Seely
- Eaton
- Eschs
- Floral
- Glen Crouse
- Glen Grouse
- Grand Summit
- Hackney / Constant
- Hooser
- Kellogg
- Maple City
- Moxham
- New Salem†
- Otto
- Pleasant Valley
- Rainbow Bend
- Redbud
- Rock†
- Silverdale†
- Tannehill
- Taussig
- Tisdale
- Torrance
- Tresham
- Vinton
- Wilmot

=== Ghost towns ===
- Etzanoa
- Polo

=== Townships ===
Cowley County is divided into twenty-five townships. The cities of Arkansas City and Winfield are considered governmentally independent and are excluded from the census figures for the townships. In the following table, the population center is the largest city (or cities) included in that township's population total, if it is of a significant size.

Township	FIPS	Population center	Population	Population density /km^{2} (/sq mi)	Land area km^{2} (sq mi)	Water area km^{2} (sq mi)	Water %	Geographic coordinates
Beaver	05025		244	3 (7)	92 (36)	2 (1)	1.91%	37°10′42″N 97°5′26″W
Bolton	07875		1,754	13 (33)	136 (53)	2 (1)	1.59%	37°3′1″N 97°4′0″W
Cedar	11250		44	0 (1)	119 (46)	1 (0)	0.45%	37°5′9″N 96°36′27″W
Creswell	16375		2,098	22 (56)	97 (38)	2 (1)	2.07%	37°4′42″N 97°1′3″W
Dexter	17950		506	3 (7)	185 (71)	0 (0)	0.19%	37°11′56″N 96°42′27″W
Fairview	22475		203	2 (6)	93 (36)	0 (0)	0.29%	37°21′22″N 96°58′50″W
Grant	27550		76	1 (2)	116 (45)	0 (0)	0.09%	37°3′49″N 96°41′3″W
Harvey	30525		117	1 (2)	162 (63)	0 (0)	0.24%	37°26′47″N 96°37′58″W
Liberty	39950		218	2 (5)	124 (48)	0 (0)	0.02%	37°9′3″N 96°50′31″W
Maple	44450		702	8 (20)	91 (35)	0 (0)	0%	37°25′59″N 97°6′7″W
Ninnescah	50625		1,114	12 (31)	93 (36)	0 (0)	0.09%	37°21′59″N 97°6′21″W
Omnia	52850		357	4 (10)	93 (36)	0 (0)	0.22%	37°26′13″N 96°46′25″W
Otter	53625		54	0 (1)	135 (52)	1 (0)	0.68%	37°11′25″N 96°33′0″W
Pleasant Valley	56500		838	7 (18)	117 (45)	0 (0)	0.05%	37°9′45″N 97°0′0″W
Richland	59275		178	2 (4)	108 (42)	0 (0)	0%	37°25′33″N 96°52′50″W
Rock Creek	60525		243	3 (7)	92 (35)	1 (0)	0.55%	37°26′5″N 96°59′25″W
Salem	62625		364	5 (14)	66 (26)	0 (0)	0.27%	37°20′9″N 96°53′20″W
Sheridan	64650		159	2 (4)	93 (36)	0 (0)	0.01%	37°15′44″N 96°45′51″W
Silver Creek	65500		770	8 (21)	93 (36)	0 (0)	0.27%	37°20′8″N 96°45′41″W
Silverdale	65575	Silverdale	327	2 (6)	136 (53)	0 (0)	0.31%	37°3′55″N 96°52′56″W
Spring Creek	67400		77	1 (2)	115 (45)	0 (0)	0.26%	37°4′31″N 96°47′10″W
Tisdale	70725		340	4 (11)	78 (30)	0 (0)	0.13%	37°16′6″N 96°52′25″W
Vernon	73575		502	5 (13)	102 (39)	1 (0)	0.67%	37°15′25″N 97°5′18″W
Walnut	74925		626	7 (18)	89 (34)	0 (0)	0.18%	37°15′17″N 96°57′27″W
Windsor	79875		211	1 (2)	243 (94)	0 (0)	0.18%	37°19′13″N 96°38′22″W
Sources: "Census 2000 U.S. Gazetteer Files". U.S. Census Bureau, Geography Division. Archived from the original on August 2, 2002.

== Notable people ==
See List of people from Cowley County, Kansas

General Dean Coldwell Strother was a United States Air Force four-star general who served as U.S. Military Representative, NATO Military Committee (USMILREP), from 1962 to 1965; and as Commander in Chief, North American Air Defense Command/Commander in Chief, Continental Air Defense Command (CINCNORAD/CINCONAD), from 1965 to 1966.

Robert Docking was a successful banker and mayor of Arkansas City before he became the 38th Governor of Kansas.

Several college football head coaches have passed through Winfield that have gone on to become widely recognized. Jerry Kill is the current head coach for the Minnesota Golden Gophers—he played for the Southwestern Moundbuilders under Dennis Franchione when he was head coach. Jack Mitchell went on to coach several schools including the Kansas Jayhawks. Former head coach and for the Oklahoma Sooners and College Football Hall of Fame member Bennie Owen was born in Arkansas City.

Perhaps the most famous resident of Cowley County is the fictional character Mary Ann Summers from the television show Gilligan's Island. It is said on the show that she is "employed at the Winfield General Store."

== See also ==
- National Register of Historic Places listings in Cowley County, Kansas

Community information for Kansas

- Kansas locations by per capita income
- List of counties in Kansas
- List of townships in Kansas
- List of cities in Kansas
- List of unincorporated communities in Kansas
- List of ghost towns in Kansas
