= Valverde Township, Kansas =

Township in Sumner County, Kansas, U.S.

Valverde Township
- Township
- Location within Sumner County
- Coordinates: 37.177276°N 97.208451°W
- Country: United States
- State: Kansas
- County: Sumner
- Established: 1874

Government
  - Trustee: David Hutchins

Area
  - Total: 36.04 sq mi (93.3 km^{2})
  - Land: 35.764 sq mi (92.63 km^{2})
  - Water: 0.276 sq mi (0.71 km^{2}) 0.77%

Population (2020)
  - Total: 118
  - Density: 3.30/sq mi (1.27/km^{2})
- Time zone: UTC-6 (CST)
  - Summer (DST): UTC-5 (CDT)
- Area code: 620
- GNIS feature ID: 470336

Valverde Township is a township in Sumner County, Kansas, United States. As of the 2020 census, its population was 118.

== History ==
Valverde Township was established in 1874.

== Geography ==
Valverde Township covers an area of 36.04 square miles (93.3 km^{2}), 0.77% of it water. The Arkansas River flows through it, as well as Slate Creek and Winser Creek.

=== Communities ===
- Adamsville

=== Adjacent townships ===
Oxford Township, Sumner County
Avon Township, Sumner County	northwest	north	northeast	Vernon Township, Cowley County
Greene Township, Sumner County	west	self	east	Beaver Township, Cowley County
Guelph Township, Sumner County	southwest	south	southeast	Bolton Township, Cowley County
Walton Township, Sumner County

== Demographics ==
As of the 2020 census, the township had a population of 118, giving a population density of 3.30 people per square mile (1.27 people/km^{2}). The racial makeup of the township was 88.1% White, 1.7% Native American, 0.8% Asian, 1.7% from some other race, and 7.6% from two or more races. Hispanics or Latinos of any race were 2.5% of the population.

The 2020–2024 American Community Survey estimated that the township contained 22 households and 31 housing units.
