= Maple City =

Maple City may refer to:

- Maple City, Kansas
- Maple City, Michigan
