= Windsor Township, Kansas =

Windsor Township
- Township
- Location in Cowley County
- Coordinates: 37°19′43″N 096°34′55″W
- Country: United States
- State: Kansas
- County: Cowley

Area
  - Total: 94 sq mi (243 km^{2})
  - Land: 93.66 sq mi (242.58 km^{2})
  - Water: 0.17 sq mi (0.43 km^{2}) 0.18%
- Elevation: 1,355 ft (413 m)

Population (2020)
  - Total: 154
  - Density: 1.64/sq mi (0.635/km^{2})
- GNIS feature ID: 0469901

Windsor Township is a township in Cowley County, Kansas, United States. As of the 2020 census, its population was 154.

== Geography ==
Windsor Township covers an area of 93.82 square miles (243.0 km^{2}) and contains one incorporated settlement, Cambridge. According to the USGS, it contains two cemeteries: Gospel Ridge and Windsor.

The streams of Blue Branch, Cedar Creek, Chilocco Creek, Coon Creek and School Creek run through this township.
