= Grand Summit, Kansas =

Unincorporated community in Cowley County, Kansas

Coordinates: 37°22′05″N 96°32′48″W

Grand Summit is an unincorporated community in Cowley County, Kansas, United States.

== History ==
A post office was opened in Grand Summit in 1882, and remained in operation until it was discontinued in 1933.

Grand Summit was a shipping point on the Atchison, Topeka and Santa Fe Railway. According to the 1910 Census, Grand Summit contained 52 inhabitants.

== Education ==
The community is served by Central USD 462 public school district.
