= Omnia Township, Kansas =

Omnia Township
- Township
- Location in Cowley County
- Coordinates: 37°25′58″N 096°46′53″W
- Country: United States
- State: Kansas
- County: Cowley

Area
  - Total: 36.17 sq mi (93.67 km^{2})
  - Land: 36.09 sq mi (93.46 km^{2})
  - Water: 0.081 sq mi (0.21 km^{2}) 0.22%
- Elevation: 1,421 ft (433 m)

Population (2020)
  - Total: 274
  - Density: 7.59/sq mi (2.93/km^{2})
- GNIS ID: 0470035

Omnia Township is a township in Cowley County, Kansas, United States. As of the 2020 census, it had a population of 274.

== Geography ==
Omnia Township covers an area of 36.17 square miles (93.7 km^{2}) and contains one incorporated settlement, Atlanta.

The streams of Lower Dutch Creek, Mud Creek, and Upper Dutch Creek run through this township.
