= Akron, Kansas =

Unincorporated community in Cowley County, Kansas

Akron is an unincorporated community in Fairview Township, Cowley County, Kansas, United States. Akron is located at 37°21′06″N 97°00′54″W.

== History ==
The first post office at Akron (called Little Dutch until 1882) was opened in 1872, and remained in operation until it was discontinued in 1912.

== Education ==
The community is served by Winfield USD 465 public school district.
