= Otter Township =

Otter Township may refer to:

- Otter Township, Saline County, Arkansas, in Saline County, Arkansas
- Otter Township, Warren County, Iowa
- Otter Township, Cowley County, Kansas
