= Walton Township, Sumner County, Kansas =

Township in Sumner County, Kansas, U.S.

Walton Township
- Township
- Location within Sumner County
- Coordinates: 37.06407°N 97.202387°W
- Country: United States
- State: Kansas
- County: Sumner
- Established: 1872

Government
  - Trustee: Julie Russell

Area
  - Total: 53.504 sq mi (138.57 km^{2})
  - Land: 53.504 sq mi (138.57 km^{2})
  - Water: 0 sq mi (0 km^{2}) 0%

Population (2020)
  - Total: 306
  - Density: 5.72/sq mi (2.21/km^{2})
- Time zone: UTC-6 (CST)
  - Summer (DST): UTC-5 (CDT)
- Area code: 620
- GNIS feature ID: 470052

Walton Township is a township in Sumner County, Kansas, United States. As of the 2020 census, its population was 306.

== History ==
Walton Township was established in 1872. Walton Township was home to the extinct town of Salt City, whose post office was in operation from 1872 to 1885. Salt City was known as Remanto until October 26, 1874, and had a peak population of 60 in 1880.

== Geography ==
Valverde Township covers an area of 53.504 square miles (138.57 km^{2}), all of it land.

=== Communities ===
- part of Geuda Springs
- Ashton

=== Adjacent townships ===
Valverde Township, Sumner County
Greene Township, Sumner County	northwest	north	northeast	Beaver Township, Cowley County
Guelph Township, Sumner County	west	self	east	Bolton Township, Cowley County
		south
Kay County, Oklahoma

== Transportation ==
=== Major highways ===
- US-166

== Demographics ==
As of the 2020 census, the township had a population of 306, giving a population density of 5.72 people per square mile (2.21 people/km^{2}). The racial makeup of the township was 88.6% White, 2.6% Native American, 1.0% Black or African American, 2.6% from some other race, and 5.2% from two or more races. Hispanics or Latinos of any race were 2.3% of the population.

The 2020–2024 American Community Survey estimated that the township contained 127 households and 150 housing units.
