= Vinton, Kansas =

Unincorporated community in Cowley County, Kansas

Vinton is an unincorporated community in Cowley County, Kansas, United States. It is located at 37°06′20″N 96°49′31″W.

== History ==
Vinton had a post office from 1888 until 1926.

== Education ==
The community is served by Dexter USD 471 public school district.
