= Dexter Township =

Dexter Township may refer to the following places in the United States:

- Dexter Township, Cowley County, Kansas
- Dexter Township, Michigan
- Dexter Township, Minnesota
