= KWLD =

KWLD may refer to:

- KWLD (FM), a radio station (91.5 FM) licensed to Plainview, Texas, United States
- Strother Field (ICAO code KWLD)
