= Harvey Township =

Harvey Township may refer to the following townships in the United States:

- Harvey Township, Meeker County, Minnesota
- Harvey Township, Cowley County, Kansas
