= Ninnescah Township =

Ninnescah Township may refer to the following townships in the United States:

- Ninnescah Township, Cowley County, Kansas
- Ninnescah Township, Kingman County, Kansas
- Ninnescah Township, Sedgwick County, Kansas
