= Ferrell Anderson =

American baseball player (1918–1978)

- Catcher
- Born: January 9, 1918; Maple City, Kansas, U.S.
- Died: March 12, 1978 (aged 60); Joplin, Missouri, U.S.
- Batted: Right Threw: Right

MLB debut
- April 16, 1946, for the Brooklyn Dodgers

Last MLB appearance
- September 1, 1953, for the St. Louis Cardinals

MLB statistics
- Batting average: .261
- Home runs: 2
- Runs batted in: 15
- Stats at Baseball Reference

Teams
- Brooklyn Dodgers (1946); St. Louis Cardinals (1953)

Ferrell Jack Anderson (January 9, 1918 – March 12, 1978), nicknamed "Andy", was an American catcher in Major League Baseball.

Anderson was signed by the New York Yankees in 1939 after spending four years as an all conference football tackle at the University of Kansas. He was purchased by the Brooklyn Dodgers from the Yankees system in 1942. Only a few months into the season he was drafted and went into the Army. He left the service in 1945 and returned to the Dodgers minor league system. He appeared in 79 games for the Dodgers in 1946. He was traded to the Philadelphia Phillies in 1951 and then purchased by the St. Louis Browns. In 1953, he was sold again, this time to the St. Louis Cardinals. He played in 18 games for the Cards in 1953.

As a Dodger, Anderson caught Ed Head's no-hitter on April 23, 1946.
