= Grant Township, Cowley County, Kansas =

Grant Township
- Township
- Location in Cowley County
- Coordinates: 37°03′45″N 096°41′11″W
- Country: United States
- State: Kansas
- County: Cowley

Area
  - Total: 44.84 sq mi (116.13 km^{2})
  - Land: 44.80 sq mi (116.03 km^{2})
  - Water: 0.039 sq mi (0.1 km^{2}) 0.09%
- Elevation: 1,260 ft (384 m)

Population (2020)
  - Total: 75
  - Density: 1.7/sq mi (0.65/km^{2})
- GNIS feature ID: 0469069

Grant Township is a township in Cowley County, Kansas, United States. As of the 2020 census, its population was 75.

== Geography ==
Grant Township covers an area of 44.84 square miles (116.1 km^{2}) and contains no incorporated settlements. According to the USGS, it contains one cemetery, Patton.
