= Cedar Township, Cowley County, Kansas =

Cedar Township
- Township
- Location in Cowley County
- Coordinates: 37°03′10″N 096°34′57″W
- Country: United States
- State: Kansas
- County: Cowley

Area
  - Total: 46.21 sq mi (119.69 km^{2})
  - Land: 46.00 sq mi (119.15 km^{2})
  - Water: 0.21 sq mi (0.54 km^{2}) 0.45%
- Elevation: 1,240 ft (378 m)

Population (2020)
  - Total: 20
  - Density: 0.43/sq mi (0.17/km^{2})
- GNIS feature ID: 0469066

Cedar Township is a township in Cowley County, Kansas, United States. As of the 2020 census, its population was 20.

== Geography ==
Cedar Township covers an area of 46.21 square miles (119.7 km^{2}) and contains no incorporated settlements. According to the USGS, it contains one cemetery, Rock Creek.

The streams of Acker Creek, Bear Creek, Branson Creek, Dog Run, Donahue Creek, Rush Creek, Spring Creek, Spring Creek and Whartenby Creek run through this township.
