= Spring Creek Township, Cowley County, Kansas =

Spring Creek Township
- Township
- Location in Cowley County
- Coordinates: 37°04′00″N 096°46′01″W
- Country: United States
- State: Kansas
- County: Cowley

Area
  - Total: 44.6 sq mi (115.6 km^{2})
  - Land: 44.5 sq mi (115.3 km^{2})
  - Water: 0.12 sq mi (0.31 km^{2}) 0.27%
- Elevation: 1,348 ft (411 m)

Population (2020)
  - Total: 76
  - Density: 1.7/sq mi (0.66/km^{2})
- GNIS feature ID: 0469583

Spring Creek Township is a township in Cowley County, Kansas, United States. As of the 2020 census, its population was 76.

== Geography ==
Spring Creek Township covers an area of 44.63 square miles (115.6 km^{2}) and contains no incorporated settlements. According to the USGS, it contains one cemetery, Maple City.

The streams of Panther Creek and Shellrock Creek run through this township.
