= Walnut Township, Cowley County, Kansas =

Walnut Township
- Township
- Location in Cowley County
- Coordinates: 37°14′30″N 096°57′31″W
- Country: United States
- State: Kansas
- County: Cowley

Area
  - Total: 34.36 sq mi (88.99 km^{2})
  - Land: 34.30 sq mi (88.83 km^{2})
  - Water: 0.062 sq mi (0.16 km^{2}) 0.18%
- Elevation: 1,194 ft (364 m)

Population (2020)
  - Total: 590
  - Density: 17/sq mi (6.6/km^{2})
- GNIS feature ID: 0469557

Walnut Township is a township in Cowley County, Kansas, United States. As of the 2020 census, its population was 590.

== Geography ==
Walnut Township covers an area of 34.36 square miles (89.0 km^{2}) and surrounds the northern and eastern sides of the city of Winfield. According to the USGS, it contains one cemetery, Cowley.

The streams of Black Crook Creek, Cedar Creek, East Badger Creek, Lone Elm Creek, Timber Creek and West Badger Creek run through this township.
