= Wilmot, Kansas =

Unincorporated community in Cowley County, Kansas

Coordinates: 37°22′34″N 96°52′33″W

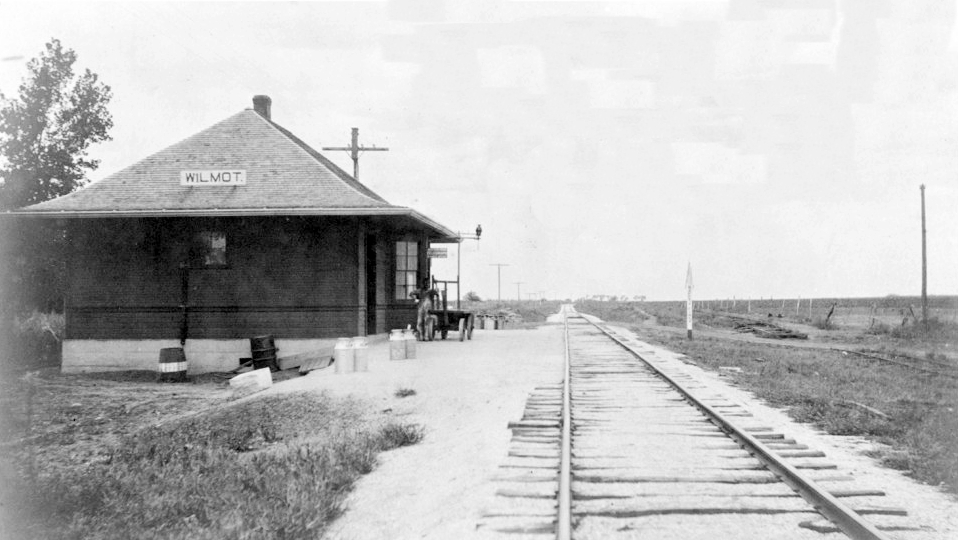
Former St. Louis–San Francisco Railway depot, 1916

Wilmot is an unincorporated community in Cowley County, Kansas, United States.

== History ==
A post office was opened in Wilmot in 1879, and remained in operation until it was closed in 1957. The population of Wilmot in 1910 was 75.

== Education ==
The community is served by Central USD 462 public school district.
