= Liberty Township, Cowley County, Kansas =

Liberty Township
- Township
- Location in Cowley County
- Coordinates: 37°10′34″N 096°50′03″W
- Country: United States
- State: Kansas
- County: Cowley

Area
  - Total: 47.97 sq mi (124.25 km^{2})
  - Land: 47.96 sq mi (124.22 km^{2})
  - Water: 0.012 sq mi (0.03 km^{2}) 0.02%
- Elevation: 1,250 ft (380 m)

Population (2020)
  - Total: 174
  - Density: 3.63/sq mi (1.40/km^{2})
- GNIS feature ID: 0469565

Liberty Township is a township in Cowley County, Kansas, United States. As of the 2020 census, its population was 174.

== Geography ==
Liberty Township covers an area of 47.97 square miles (124.2 km^{2}) and contains no incorporated settlements. According to the USGS, it contains two cemeteries: Prairie Ridge and Rose Valley.

The streams of Crabb Creek, Harper Creek, Horse Creek, Pebble Creek and Wildcat Creek run through this township.
