= K-55 (Kansas highway) =

State highway in Kansas, U.S.

K-55
- K-55 highlighted in red

Route information
- Maintained by KDOT
- Length: 12.049 mi (19.391 km)
- Existed: 1927–present

Major junctions
- West end: US-81 west of Belle Plaine
- East end: K-15 in Udall

Location
- Country: United States
- State: Kansas
- Counties: Sumner, Cowley

Highway system
- Kansas State Highway System; Interstate; US; State; Spurs
← US-54	→ K-57

K-55 is a 12.049-mile-long (19.391 km) west–east state highway in the U.S. state of Kansas. The highway's western terminus is at U.S. Route 81 (US-81) roughly 11 miles (18 km) north of Wellington and the eastern terminus is at K-15 in Udall. It passes through the city of Belle Plaine.

The road's westbound terminus is a triangle-type intersection. Just before the western terminus, the road passes under the Kansas Turnpike, although there is no intersection. Turnpike access is available at K-53 to the north and US-160 to the south near Wellington.

Before state highways were numbered in Kansas there were auto trails. K-55's western terminus closely follows the Meridian Highway and the South West Trail. It was first designated a state highway by 1927, and at that time ran from US-81 in Belle Plaine southeast to K-12 in Oxford. A year later, it had been realigned to travel east from US-81 to K-15 west of Udall. By 1945, a new alignment of K-15 had been completed, at which time K-55 was extended east to the new alignment. The entire length of K-55 was paved by 1948.

== Route description ==
K-55's western terminus is at US-81 north of Wellington. The highway travels east through flat rural farmland and after roughly 0.4 miles (0.64 km) passes under I-35, also known as the Kansas Turnpike, with no connection. K-55 continues east to an at-grade crossing with a BNSF Railway track as it enters the city of Belle Plaine. It continues through the city as 4th Avenue for about one mile (1.6 km) then exits the city. K-55 proceeds east to a crossing over Cowskin Creek, a tributary of the Arkansas River. It continues through flat farmland to a crossing over the Arkansas River, a tributary of the Mississippi River. K-55 continues east to a crossing over Antelope Creek before entering Cowley County. The roadway enters the city of Udall and has an at-grade crossing with a BNSF Railway track. K-55 reaches Clark Street where it turns north and reaches its eastern terminus at K-15.

The Kansas Department of Transportation (KDOT) tracks the traffic levels on its highways, and in 2018, they determined that on average the traffic varied from 805 vehicles per day near the eastern terminus to 2,050 vehicles per day just east of Belle Plaine. K-55 connects to the National Highway System at its junction with K-15.

== History ==
Before state highways were numbered in Kansas there were auto trails, which were an informal network of marked routes that existed in the United States and Canada in the early part of the 20th century. K-55's western terminus, US-81, closely follows the Meridian Highway and the South West Trail.

K-55 was first designated as a state highway by the State Highway Commission of Kansas, now known as KDOT, by 1927. At that time it ran from US-81 west of Belle Plaine southeast to K-12 in Oxford. By 1928, it was realigned to travel east from US-81 to K-15 west of Udall. In November 1930, it was announced that work would begin spring of 1931, to reconstruct the road from Belle Plaine east to the Cowley County line. This included a bridge over Cowskin Creek and Arkansas River. K-55 was extended east along K-15 to US-77 south of Rock by 1931. By 1932, K-55 was truncated back to its pre-1931 terminus. In late-March 1932, a bid was approved for grading, culvert, and bridge projects on K-55 east of Belle Plaine. The bridge over the Arkansas River was finished in 1933.

In a resolution passed on January 1, 1941, it was approved to realign K-15 from southeast of Mulvane to Udall, and to extend K-55 east to the new alignment in Udall. By October 1941, SHC engineers and surveyors were planning the new alignment of K-15 from Wichita to Winfield. The new alignment of K-15 and extension of K-55 was completed by 1945. By 1948, the entire length of K-55 was paved.

In October 2022 a complete over-haul and reconstruction of the bridge began after numerous delays. The rebuild is expected to be completed in November 2023.

== Major intersections ==
County	Location	mi	km	Destinations	Notes
Sumner	Belle Plaine Township	0.000	0.000	US-81 – Wellington, Wichita	Western terminus; highway continues south as US-81 (west as 90th Avenue North)
Cowley	Udall	12.049	19.391	K-15	Eastern terminus
1.000 mi = 1.609 km; 1.000 km = 0.621 mi
