= Silver Creek Township, Kansas =

Silver Creek Township
- Township
- Location in Cowley County
- Coordinates: 37°21′04″N 096°47′00″W
- Country: United States
- State: Kansas
- County: Cowley

Area
  - Total: 36.16 sq mi (93.65 km^{2})
  - Land: 36.1 sq mi (93.4 km^{2})
  - Water: 0.097 sq mi (0.25 km^{2}) 0.27%
- Elevation: 1,391 ft (424 m)

Population (2020)
  - Total: 689
  - Density: 19.1/sq mi (7.38/km^{2})
- GNIS feature ID: 0469912

Silver Creek Township is a township in Cowley County, Kansas, United States. As of the 2020 census, its population was 689.

== Geography ==
Silver Creek Township covers an area of 36.16 square miles (93.7 km^{2}) and contains one incorporated settlement, Burden. According to the USGS, it contains two cemeteries: Burden and Grand Prairie.
