= Salem Township, Cowley County, Kansas =

Salem Township
- Township
- Location in Cowley County
- Coordinates: 37°20′45″N 095°54′01″W
- Country: United States
- State: Kansas
- County: Cowley

Area
  - Total: 25.65 sq mi (66.43 km^{2})
  - Land: 25.58 sq mi (66.25 km^{2})
  - Water: 0.069 sq mi (0.18 km^{2}) 0.27%
- Elevation: 873 ft (266 m)

Population (2020)
  - Total: 307
  - Density: 12.0/sq mi (4.63/km^{2})
- GNIS feature ID: 0469924

Salem Township is a township in Cowley County, Kansas, United States. As of the 2020 census, its population was 307.

== Geography ==
Salem Township covers an area of 25.65 square miles (66.4 km^{2}) and contains no incorporated settlements. According to the USGS, it contains one cemetery, New Salem. The man-made Timber Creek Lake occupies the central portion of the township.
