= Richland Township, Cowley County, Kansas =

Richland Township
- Township
- Location in Cowley County
- Coordinates: 37°25′28″N 096°51′11″W
- Country: United States
- State: Kansas
- County: Cowley

Area
  - Total: 41.8 sq mi (108.2 km^{2})
  - Land: 41.8 sq mi (108.2 km^{2})
  - Water: 0 sq mi (0 km^{2}) 0%
- Elevation: 1,300 ft (400 m)

Population (2020)
  - Total: 169
  - Density: 4.05/sq mi (1.56/km^{2})
- GNIS feature ID: 0470024

Richland Township is a township in Cowley County, Kansas, United States. As of the 2020 census, its population was 169.

== Geography ==
Richland Township covers an area of 41.78 square miles (108.2 km^{2}) and contains no incorporated settlements.

The stream of Richland Creek runs through this township.
