= Oxford Township, Sumner County, Kansas =

Township in Sumner County, Kansas, U.S.

Oxford Township
- Township
- Location within Sumner County
- Coordinates: 37.264442°N 97.195267°W
- Country: United States
- State: Kansas
- County: Sumner
- Established: 1871

Government
  - Trustee: Anthony Metz

Area
  - Total: 38.514 sq mi (99.75 km^{2})
  - Land: 38.083 sq mi (98.63 km^{2})
  - Water: 0.431 sq mi (1.12 km^{2}) 1.12%

Population (2020)
  - Total: 1,259
  - Density: 33.06/sq mi (12.76/km^{2})
- Time zone: UTC-6 (CST)
  - Summer (DST): UTC-5 (CDT)
- Area code: 620 and 316
- GNIS feature ID: 470330

Oxford Township is a township in Sumner County, Kansas, United States. As of the 2020 census, its population was 1,259.

== History ==
Oxford Township was established in 1871. It eventually annexed a part of Palestine Township.

== Geography ==
Oxford Township covers an area of 38.514 square miles (99.75 km^{2}), 1.12% of it being water. The Arkansas River and Ninnescah River flow through it, as well as Winser Creek and Mill Race.

=== Communities ===
- Oxford

=== Adjacent townships ===
Palestine Township, Sumner County
Harmon Township, Sumner County	northwest	north	northeast	Ninnescah Township, Cowley County
Avon Township, Sumner County	west	self	east	Vernon Township, Cowley County
Greene Township, Sumner County	southwest	south	southeast	Beaver Township, Cowley County
Valverde Township, Sumner County

== Transportation ==
=== Major highways ===
- US-160

== Demographics ==
As of the 2020 census, the township had a population of 1,259, giving a population density of 33.06 people per square mile (12.76 people/km^{2}). The racial makeup of the township was 89.6% White, 0.7% Black or African American, 0.4% Native American, 0.2% Asian, 0.8% from some other race, and 8.3% from two or more races. Hispanics or Latinos of any race were 5.7% of the population.

The 2020–2024 American Community Survey estimated that the township contained 488 households and 535 housing units.
