= Sheridan Township, Cowley County, Kansas =

Sheridan Township
- Township
- Location in Cowley County
- Coordinates: 37°16′14″N 096°46′52″W
- Country: United States
- State: Kansas
- County: Cowley

Area
  - Total: 35.76 sq mi (92.62 km^{2})
  - Land: 35.76 sq mi (92.61 km^{2})
  - Water: 0.0039 sq mi (0.01 km^{2}) 0.01%
- Elevation: 1,266 ft (386 m)

Population (2020)
  - Total: 161
  - Density: 4.50/sq mi (1.74/km^{2})
- GNIS feature ID: 0469580

Sheridan Township is a township in Cowley County, Kansas, United States. As of the 2020 census, its population was 161.

== Geography ==
Sheridan Township covers an area of 35.76 square miles (92.6 km^{2}) and contains no incorporated settlements. According to the USGS, it contains one cemetery, Silver Creek.

The streams of Plum Creek and Plum Creek run through this township.
