= Tisdale Township, Kansas =

Tisdale Township
- Township
- Location in Cowley County
- Coordinates: 37°16′18″N 096°51′10″W
- Country: United States
- State: Kansas
- County: Cowley

Area
  - Total: 30.09 sq mi (77.93 km^{2})
  - Land: 30.05 sq mi (77.83 km^{2})
  - Water: 0.039 sq mi (0.1 km^{2}) 0.13%
- Elevation: 1,332 ft (406 m)

Population (2020)
  - Total: 298
  - Density: 9.92/sq mi (3.83/km^{2})
- GNIS feature ID: 0469566

Tisdale Township is a township in Cowley County, Kansas, United States. As of the 2020 census, its population was 298.

== Geography ==
Tisdale Township covers an area of 30.09 square miles (77.9 km^{2}) and contains no incorporated settlements. According to the USGS, it contains one cemetery, Tisdale.

The stream of Snake Creek runs through this township.
