= Harvey Township, Cowley County, Kansas =

Harvey Township
- Township
- Location in Cowley County
- Coordinates: 37°25′58″N 096°34′39″W
- Country: United States
- State: Kansas
- County: Cowley

Area
  - Total: 62.88 sq mi (162.85 km^{2})
  - Land: 62.73 sq mi (162.46 km^{2})
  - Water: 0.15 sq mi (0.39 km^{2}) 0.24%
- Elevation: 1,460 ft (445 m)

Population (2020)
  - Total: 83
  - Density: 1.3/sq mi (0.51/km^{2})
- GNIS feature ID: 0469947

Harvey Township is a township in Cowley County, Kansas, United States. As of the 2020 census, its population was 83.

== Geography ==
Harvey Township covers an area of 62.88 square miles (162.9 km^{2}) and contains no incorporated settlements. According to the USGS, it contains three cemeteries: Glen Grouse, Mount Vernon and Timber Creek.

The streams of Ferguson Creek, Gardners Branch, Goose Creek, Riley Creek and Wagoner Creek run through this township.
