= Maple Township, Kansas =

Maple Township
- Township
- Location in Cowley County
- Coordinates: 37°26′12″N 097°05′38″W
- Country: United States
- State: Kansas
- County: Cowley

Area
  - Total: 35.11 sq mi (90.94 km^{2})
  - Land: 35.11 sq mi (90.93 km^{2})
  - Water: 0 sq mi (0 km^{2}) 0%
- Elevation: 1,237 ft (377 m)

Population (2020)
  - Total: 761
  - Density: 21.7/sq mi (8.37/km^{2})
- GNIS feature ID: 0470215

Maple Township is a township in Cowley County, Kansas, United States. As of the 2020 census, its population was 761.

== Geography ==
Maple Township covers an area of 35.11 square miles (90.9 km^{2}) and contains no incorporated settlements. According to the USGS, it contains two cemeteries: Red Bud and Star Valley.

The stream of Coon Creek runs through this township.
