= Belle Plaine Township, Kansas =

Township in Sumner County, Kansas, U.S.

Belle Plaine Township
- Township
- Location within Sumner County
- Coordinates: 37.423966°N 97.292267°W
- Country: United States
- State: Kansas
- County: Sumner
- Established: 1871

Government
  - Trustee: David Armstrong

Area
  - Total: 40.69 sq mi (105.4 km^{2})
  - Land: 40.411 sq mi (104.66 km^{2})
  - Water: 0.279 sq mi (0.72 km^{2}) 0.69%

Population (2020)
  - Total: 3,082
  - Density: 76.27/sq mi (29.45/km^{2})
- Time zone: UTC-6 (CST)
  - Summer (DST): UTC-5 (CDT)
- Area code: 620 and 316
- GNIS feature ID: 470222

Belle Plaine Township is a township in Sumner County, Kansas, United States. As of the 2020 census, its population was 3,082.

== History ==
Belle Plaine Township was established in 1871. Harmon Township was eventually created from part of it. Several land exchanges eventually occurred between the townships of northeast Sumner County, with Belle Plaine annexing part of Gore Township and losing some land to Palestine Township.

== Geography ==
Belle Plaine Township covers an area of 40.69 square miles (105.4 square kilometers). The Ninnescah River and Arkansas River flow through the township, as well as Cowskin Creek.

=== Communities ===
- Belle Plaine
- part of Mulvane

=== Adjacent townships ===
Salem Township, Sedgwick County
		north	northeast	Rockford Township, Sedgwick County
London Township, Sumner County	west	self	east	Gore Township, Sumner County
		south	southeast	Palestine Township, Sumner County
Harmon Township, Sumner County

== Transportation ==
=== Major highways ===
- I-35 / Kansas Turnpike
- US-81
- K-53
- K-55

== Demographics ==
As of the 2020 census, there were 3,082 people and 1,299 households residing in the township. The population density was 76.27 people per square mile (29.45 people/km^{2}). There were 1,407 housing units. The racial makeup of the township was 89.5% White, 1.0% Native American, 0.3% Black or African American, 0.2% Asian, 1.5% from some other race, and 7.6% from two or more races. Hispanics or Latinos of any race were 5.1% of the population.

There were 1,299 households: 55.7% were married couples living together, 13.6% had a male householder with no spouse present, and 25.6% had a female householder with no spouse present. The average family size was 2.74 people. 34.9% of people in the township older than 24 had a college degree, and the township had an employment rate of 54.9%.
