= Udall USD 463 =

Public school district in Udall, Kansas

Address
- 303 S. Seymour St. Udall, Kansas, 67146; United States
- Coordinates: 37°23′7″N 97°7′16″W

District information
- Type: Public
- Grades: K to 12
- Accreditation(s): KSHSAA
- Schools: 2

Other information
- Website: usd463.org

Udall USD 463 is a public unified school district headquartered in Udall, Kansas, United States. The district includes the communities of Udall, Rock, and nearby rural areas.

== Schools ==
The school district operates the following schools:

- Udall Middle/High School
- Udall Elementary School

== See also ==
- Kansas State Department of Education
- Kansas State High School Activities Association
- List of high schools in Kansas
- List of unified school districts in Kansas
