= Cambridge, Kansas =

City in Cowley County, Kansas

- City
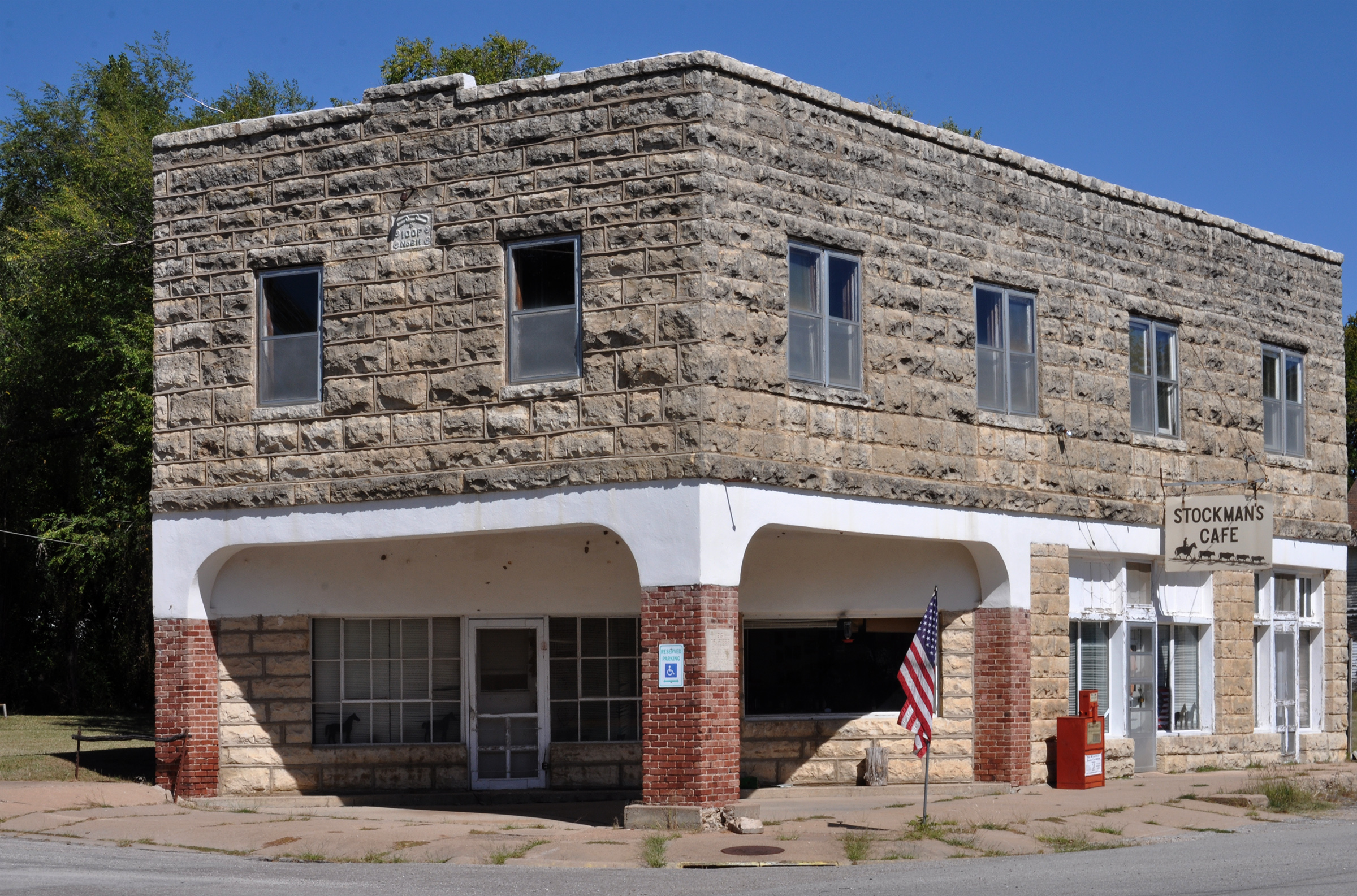
- Cambridge IOOF building, Stockman's Cafe

- Location within Cowley County and Kansas

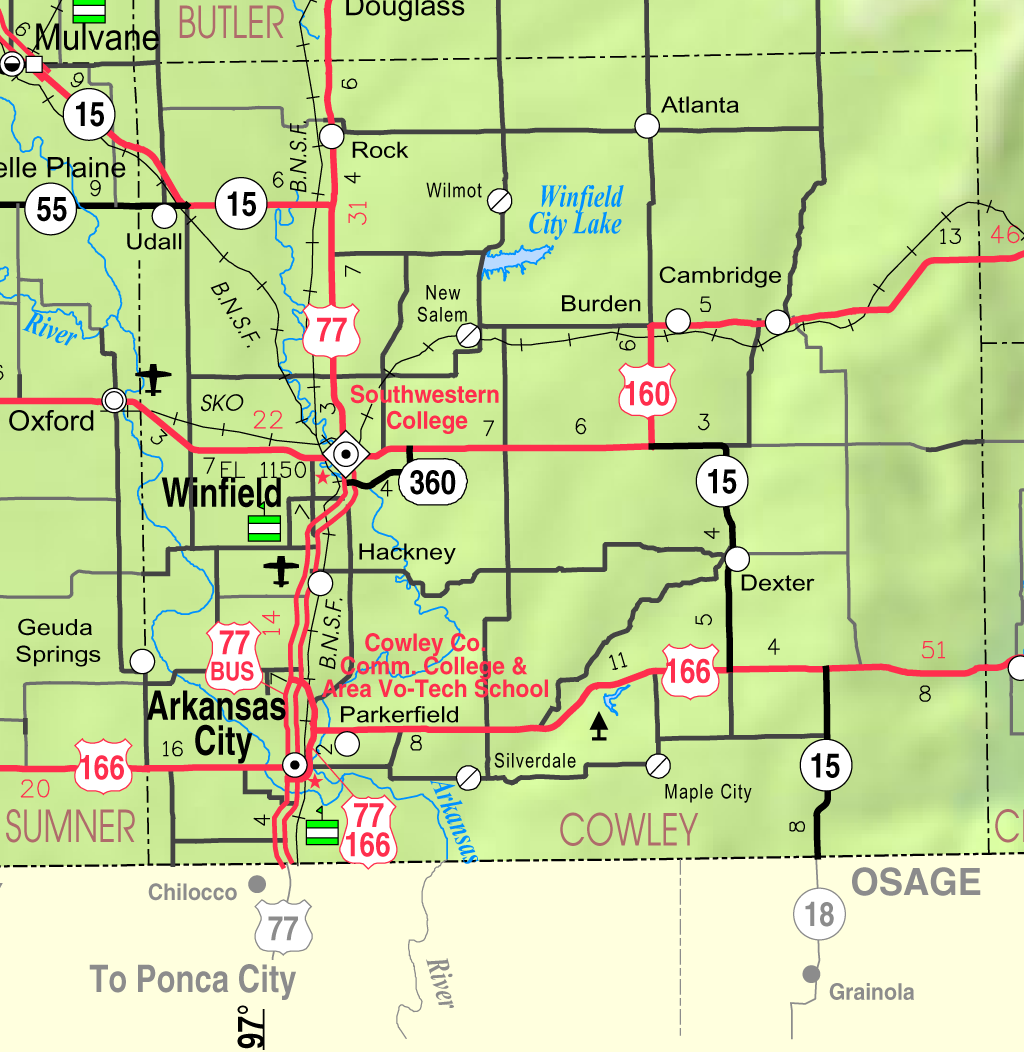
- KDOT map of Cowley County (legend)
- Coordinates: 37°19′04″N 96°40′02″W
- Country: United States
- State: Kansas
- County: Cowley
- Founded: 1880
- Incorporated: 1916
- Named for: Cambridge University

Area
  - Total: 0.17 sq mi (0.45 km^{2})
  - Land: 0.17 sq mi (0.45 km^{2})
  - Water: 0 sq mi (0.00 km^{2})
- Elevation: 1,276 ft (389 m)

Population (2020)
  - Total: 92
  - Density: 530/sq mi (200/km^{2})
- Time zone: UTC-6 (CST)
  - Summer (DST): UTC-5 (CDT)
- ZIP Code: 67023
- Area code: 620
- FIPS code: 20-10125
- GNIS ID: 2393507

Cambridge is a city in Cowley County, Kansas, United States. As of the 2020 census, the population of the city was 92.

== History ==
Like many communities in Kansas, Cambridge owes its existence to a railroad. When the Kansas City, Lawrence & Southern Railroad was built a mile south of Lazette, a new site was organized by Benjamin H. Clover and plotted on May 3, 1880, and it was named Cambridge after Cambridge University, in England. The first post office in Cambridge was established on January 30, 1880.

On December 15, 1880, the Atchison Topeka & Santa Fe Railway acquired nearly all the stock of the Kansas City, Lawrence & Southern Railroad and operated the railroad awhile as the Southern Kansas Railroad. Cambridge was a station and shipping point on the Atchison, Topeka and Santa Fe Railway.

The Cambridge Public Emergency Radio Tower was mooted as the location for one of two "control stations" of the Decision Information Distribution System, which would be used to alert the public of an enemy attack (the other was to have been in Ault, Colorado.) The control stations would send the "go" signal to ten distribution stations across the country that would then sign on and play taped messages to the public.

== Geography ==
According to the United States Census Bureau, the city has a total area of 0.17 square miles (0.44 km^{2}), all land. Cambridge is located on US Route 160 at State Highway 7. The community is located 45 miles southeast of Wichita.

=== Climate ===
The climate in this area is characterized by hot, humid summers and generally mild to cool winters. According to the Köppen Climate Classification system, Cambridge has a humid subtropical climate, abbreviated "Cfa" on climate maps.

== Demographics ==
Historical population
Census	Pop.	Note	%±
1880	98		—
1920	233		—
1930	277		18.9%
1940	246		−11.2%
1950	221		−10.2%
1960	140		−36.7%
1970	110		−21.4%
1980	113		2.7%
1990	74		−34.5%
2000	103		39.2%
2010	82		−20.4%
2020	92		12.2%
U.S. Decennial Census

=== 2020 census ===
The 2020 United States census counted 92 people, 43 households, and 34 families in Cambridge. The population density was 525.7 per square mile (203.0/km^{2}). There were 56 housing units at an average density of 320.0 per square mile (123.6/km^{2}). The racial makeup was 84.78% (78) white or European American (84.78% non-Hispanic white), 0.0% (0) black or African-American, 5.43% (5) Native American or Alaska Native, 0.0% (0) Asian, 0.0% (0) Pacific Islander or Native Hawaiian, 1.09% (1) from other races, and 8.7% (8) from two or more races. Hispanic or Latino of any race was 2.17% (2) of the population.

Of the 43 households, 30.2% had children under the age of 18; 53.5% were married couples living together; 18.6% had a female householder with no spouse or partner present. 16.3% of households consisted of individuals and 4.7% had someone living alone who was 65 years of age or older. The average household size was 2.4 and the average family size was 2.9. The percent of those with a bachelor's degree or higher was estimated to be 5.4% of the population.

20.7% of the population was under the age of 18, 4.3% from 18 to 24, 28.3% from 25 to 44, 30.4% from 45 to 64, and 16.3% who were 65 years of age or older. The median age was 42.0 years. For every 100 females, there were 80.4 males. For every 100 females ages 18 and older, there were 78.0 males.

The 2016–2020 5-year American Community Survey estimates show that the median household income was $41,250 (with a margin of error of +/- $38,538) and the median family income was $58,750 (+/- $29,982). Males had a median income of $44,583 (+/- $13,257) versus $26,250 (+/- $21,472) for females. The median income for those above 16 years old was $41,250 (+/- $15,131). Approximately, 20.0% of families and 22.5% of the population were below the poverty line, including 38.7% of those under the age of 18 and 20.0% of those ages 65 or over.

=== 2010 census ===
As of the census of 2010, there were 82 people, 39 households, and 28 families living in the city. The population density was 482.4 inhabitants per square mile (186.3/km^{2}). There were 58 housing units at an average density of 341.2 per square mile (131.7/km^{2}). The racial makeup of the city was 98.8% White and 1.2% Native American. Hispanic or Latino of any race were 1.2% of the population.

There were 39 households, of which 25.6% had children under the age of 18 living with them, 61.5% were married couples living together, 2.6% had a female householder with no husband present, 7.7% had a male householder with no wife present, and 28.2% were non-families. 28.2% of all households were made up of individuals, and 12.8% had someone living alone who was 65 years of age or older. The average household size was 2.10 and the average family size was 2.54.

The median age in the city was 50.5 years. 19.5% of residents were under the age of 18; 1.2% were between the ages of 18 and 24; 18.3% were from 25 to 44; 41.5% were from 45 to 64; and 19.5% were 65 years of age or older. The gender makeup of the city was 51.2% male and 48.8% female.

=== 2000 census ===
As of the census of 2000, there were 103 people, 46 households, and 31 families living in the city. The population density was 592.1 inhabitants per square mile (228.6/km^{2}). There were 55 housing units at an average density of 316.2 per square mile (122.1/km^{2}). The racial makeup of the city was 95.15% White, 0.97% African American, and 3.88% from two or more races.

There were 46 households, out of which 17.4% had children under the age of 18 living with them, 52.2% were married couples living together, 15.2% had a female householder with no husband present, and 32.6% were non-families. 28.3% of all households were made up of individuals, and 19.6% had someone living alone who was 65 years of age or older. The average household size was 2.24 and the average family size was 2.71.

In the city, the population was spread out, with 17.5% under the age of 18, 8.7% from 18 to 24, 24.3% from 25 to 44, 28.2% from 45 to 64, and 21.4% who were 65 years of age or older. The median age was 45 years. For every 100 females, there were 80.7 males. For every 100 females age 18 and over, there were 77.1 males.

The median income for a household in the city was $38,125, and the median income for a family was $53,500. Males had a median income of $25,625 versus $24,167 for females. The per capita income for the city was $19,413. There were 20.0% of families and 21.9% of the population living below the poverty line, including 47.1% of under eighteens and 42.9% of those over 64.

== Education ==
The community is served by Central USD 462 public school district. The Central High School mascot is Central Raiders. Cambridge High School was known as the Bulldogs.
