= Otter Township, Kansas =

Otter Township
- Township
- Location in Cowley County
- Coordinates: 37°11′14″N 096°33′57″W
- Country: United States
- State: Kansas
- County: Cowley

Area
  - Total: 52.39 sq mi (135.68 km^{2})
  - Land: 52.03 sq mi (134.76 km^{2})
  - Water: 0.36 sq mi (0.92 km^{2}) 0.68%
- Elevation: 1,056 ft (322 m)

Population (2020)
  - Total: 24
  - Density: 0.46/sq mi (0.18/km^{2})
- GNIS feature ID: 0485517

Otter Township is a township in Cowley County, Kansas, United States. As of the 2020 census, its population was 24.

== Geography ==
Otter Township covers an area of 52.39 square miles (135.7 km^{2}) and contains no incorporated settlements. According to the USGS, it contains one cemetery, Cedar Creek.

The streams of Jim Creek, Little Beaver Creek, North Cedar Creek, Shafer Creek and South Cedar Creek run through this township.
