= Pleasant Valley Township, Cowley County, Kansas =

Pleasant Valley Township
- Township
- Location in Cowley County
- Coordinates: 37°09′46″N 096°57′36″W
- Country: United States
- State: Kansas
- County: Cowley

Area
  - Total: 45.33 sq mi (117.41 km^{2})
  - Land: 45.31 sq mi (117.35 km^{2})
  - Water: 0.023 sq mi (0.06 km^{2}) 0.05%
- Elevation: 1,106 ft (337 m)

Population (2020)
  - Total: 813
  - Density: 17.9/sq mi (6.93/km^{2})
- GNIS feature ID: 0469060

Pleasant Valley Township is a township in Cowley County, Kansas, United States. As of the 2020 census, its population was 813.

== Geography ==
Pleasant Valley Township covers an area of 45.33 square miles (117.4 km^{2}) and contains no incorporated settlements. According to the USGS, it contains two cemeteries: Pleasant Valley and South Bend.

The streams of Big Badger Creek and Posey Creek run through this township.
