= Fairview Township, Cowley County, Kansas =

Fairview Township
- Township
- Location in Cowley County
- Coordinates: 37°20′45″N 096°58′21″W
- Country: United States
- State: Kansas
- County: Cowley

Area
  - Total: 36.00 sq mi (93.24 km^{2})
  - Land: 35.90 sq mi (92.97 km^{2})
  - Water: 0.10 sq mi (0.27 km^{2}) 0.29%
- Elevation: 1,286 ft (392 m)

Population (2020)
  - Total: 281
  - Density: 7.83/sq mi (3.02/km^{2})
- GNIS feature ID: 0469927

Fairview Township is a township in Cowley County, Kansas, United States. As of the 2020 census, its population was 281.

== Geography ==
Fairview Township covers an area of 36 square miles (93 km^{2}) and contains no incorporated settlements. According to the USGS, it contains one cemetery, Akron.

The streams of Dutch Creek, Foos Creek and Little Dutch Creek run through this township.
