= Dean C. Strother =

United States Air Force general

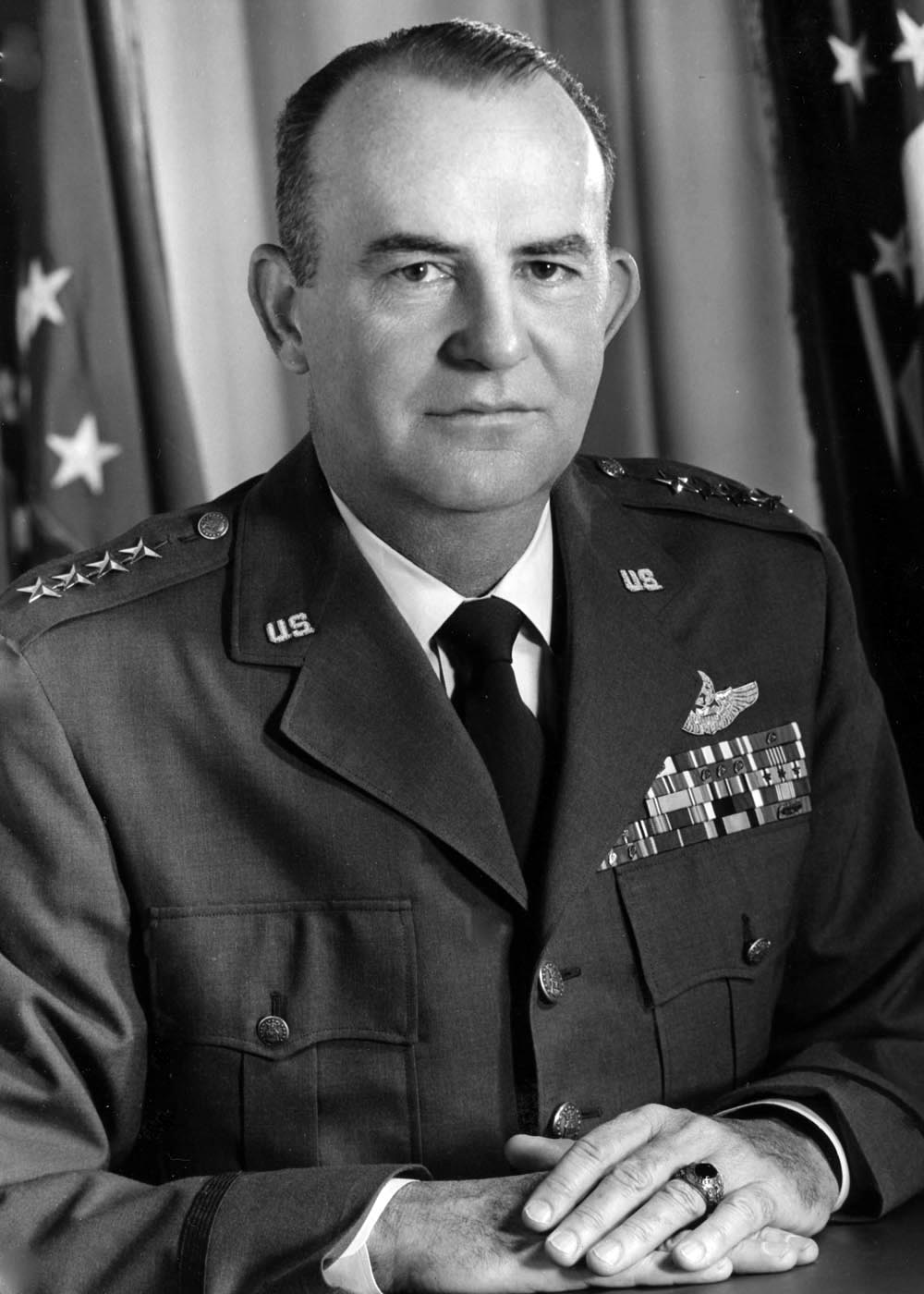
- Born: February 12, 1908; Winfield, Kansas
- Died: September 24, 2000 (aged 92); Colorado Springs, Colorado
- Military career
- Allegiance: United States of America
- Branch: United States Army; United States Air Force
- Service years: 1931–1947 (Army); 1947–1966 (Air Force)
- Rank: General
- Commands: Twelfth Air Force; Air University; NORAD
- Conflicts: World War II
- Awards: Army Distinguished Service Medal (2); Air Force Distinguished Service Medal; Silver Star; Legion of Merit (2); Distinguished Flying Cross; Air Medal (4)

Dean Coldwell Strother (February 12, 1908 – September 24, 2000) was a United States Air Force four-star general who served as U.S. Military Representative, NATO Military Committee (USMILREP), from 1962 to 1965; and as Commander in Chief, North American Air Defense Command/Commander in Chief, Continental Air Defense Command (CINCNORAD/CINCONAD), from 1965 to 1966. He also served in the United States Army Air Forces during World War II.

== Biography ==
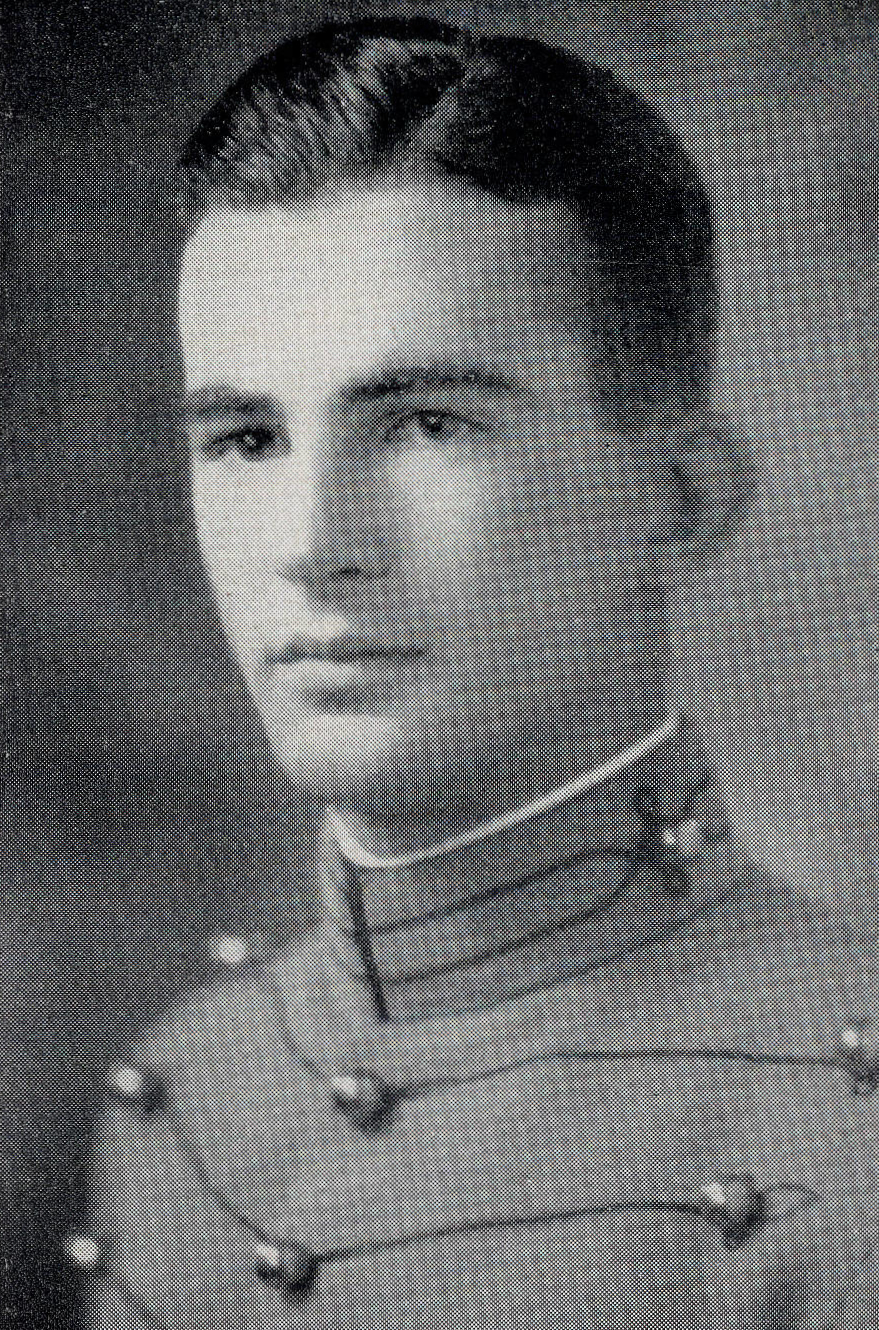
Strother as a United States Military Academy cadet c. 1931

Strother was born in Winfield, Kansas, in 1908, graduated from Winfield High School in 1925 and attended Southwestern College, Winfield, until 1927 when he received a Congressional appointment to the United States Military Academy. Upon graduation from the academy in 1931, he attended Primary and Advanced Flying Schools at Randolph Field, Texas, and received his wings at Kelly Field, Texas, in October 1932.

Some of his assignments during the period of 1932-1942 were: operations officer at Barksdale Field, Louisiana; air mail duty at the Municipal Airport, Chicago, Illinois; instrument flying instructor at Sherman Field, Fort Leavenworth, Kansas; pilot with the 72nd Bombardment Squadron, Luke Field, Hawaii; and adjutant of Randolph Field, Texas.

In July 1942, Strother became staff fighter officer of the U.S. Army Forces in the South Pacific area, and when the Thirteenth Air Force was organized in January 1943 he was appointed chief of the Fighter Command and promoted to brigadier general in May 1943. From July to January 1944, he headed an expanded outfit, the Solomon Islands Fighter Command, part of AirSol, AirSoPac; the unit directed U.S. Army, Navy and Marine, and New Zealand fighters who helped turn back the Japanese threatening Australia. His work earned him the Army Distinguished Service Medal.

Strother flew to Italy in January 1944 to command the 306th Fighter Wing of the Fifteenth Air Force, and assumed command of the XV Fighter Command in October 1944. For his services during this time, he was awarded an oak leaf cluster to the Army Distinguished Service Medal. He personally led a United States fighter task force from Italy to Russia to provide direct assistance for the Russian offensive in the East for which he was awarded the Silver Star and the Soviet Union's Order of Suvorov Second Class.

Returning to the United States in October 1945, Strother was assigned as commander of the West Coast Wing of the Air Training Command's Pacific Division at Hamilton Field, California, until August 1946 when he was selected to attend the National War College, Washington, D.C. Upon graduation from the War College in June 1947, he was assigned to Headquarters U.S. Air Force as chief, Military Personnel Division, DCS/PA; director military personnel, Office of the Deputy Chief of Staff and Assistant Deputy Chief of Staff for Personnel until March 1951 when he assumed command of the Twelfth Air Force (U.S. Air Forces in Europe) and the Fourth Allied Tactical Air Force at Wiesbaden, Germany.

Air Force portrait photograph of Strother, c. 1953

In November 1953, he returned to the United States as deputy commander of the Air University at Maxwell Air Force Base, Alabama, and became commander on June 6, 1956. In July 1958, Strother was assigned to Headquarters U.S. Air Force as deputy chief of staff, operations until November 1962 when he was appointed as the U.S. representative to the Military Committee and Standing Group NATO. In April 1965, he assumed his assignment as commander in chief NORAD and CONAD. He retired on July 31, 1966, and died on September 24, 2000.

His decorations include the Army Distinguished Service Medal with oak leaf cluster, Air Force Distinguished Service Medal, Silver Star, Legion of Merit with oak leaf cluster, Distinguished Flying Cross, Air Medal with three oak leaf clusters, and the Army Commendation Medal.

Strother's youngest brother, Donald Root Strother, was the first Army Air Corps pilot from Cowley County, Kansas to lose his life in World War II. Strother Field is named after him.

== Effective dates of promotions ==
Rank	Date
Second Lieutenant	June 11, 1931
First Lieutenant	April 20, 1935
Captain	June 11, 1941
Major	July 15, 1941
Lieutenant Colonel	January 23, 1942
Colonel	October 12, 1942
Brigadier General	May 4, 1943
Major General	May 16, 1949
Lieutenant General	September 5, 1956
General	June 30, 1962
