= Guelph Township, Kansas =

Township in Sumner County, Kansas, U.S.

Guelph Township
- Township
- Location within Sumner County
- Coordinates: 37.064561°N 97.310631°W
- Country: United States
- State: Kansas
- County: Sumner
- Established: 1873

Government
  - Trustee: Brian Byers

Area
  - Total: 54.608 sq mi (141.43 km^{2})
  - Land: 54.608 sq mi (141.43 km^{2})
  - Water: 0 sq mi (0 km^{2}) 0%

Population (2020)
  - Total: 151
  - Density: 2.77/sq mi (1.07/km^{2})
- Time zone: UTC-6 (CST)
  - Summer (DST): UTC-5 (CDT)
- Area code: 620
- GNIS feature ID: 470072

Guelph Township is a township in Sumner County, Kansas, United States. As of the 2020 census, its population was 151.

== History ==
Guelph Township was established in 1873 from South Haven Township. In 1879, part of Greene Township was created from part of Guelph Township. Guelph Township was home to the now extinct town of Guelph, whose post office was in operation from 1872 to 1902.

== Geography ==
Guelph Township covers an area of 54.608 square miles (141.43 km^{2}), all of it land. Meridian Creek flows through it.

=== Communities ===
- Portland

=== Adjacent townships ===
Greene Township, Sumner County
Jackson Township, Sumner County	northwest	north	northeast	Valverde Township, Sumner County
South Haven Township, Sumner County	west	self	east	Walton Township, Sumner County
		south
Kay County, Oklahoma

== Transportation ==
=== Major highways ===
- I-35 / Kansas Turnpike
- US-166

== Demographics ==
As of the 2020 census, the township had a population of 151, giving a population density of 2.77 people per square mile (1.07 people/km^{2}).
