= Maple City, Kansas =

Unincorporated community in Cowley County, Kansas

- Unincorporated community
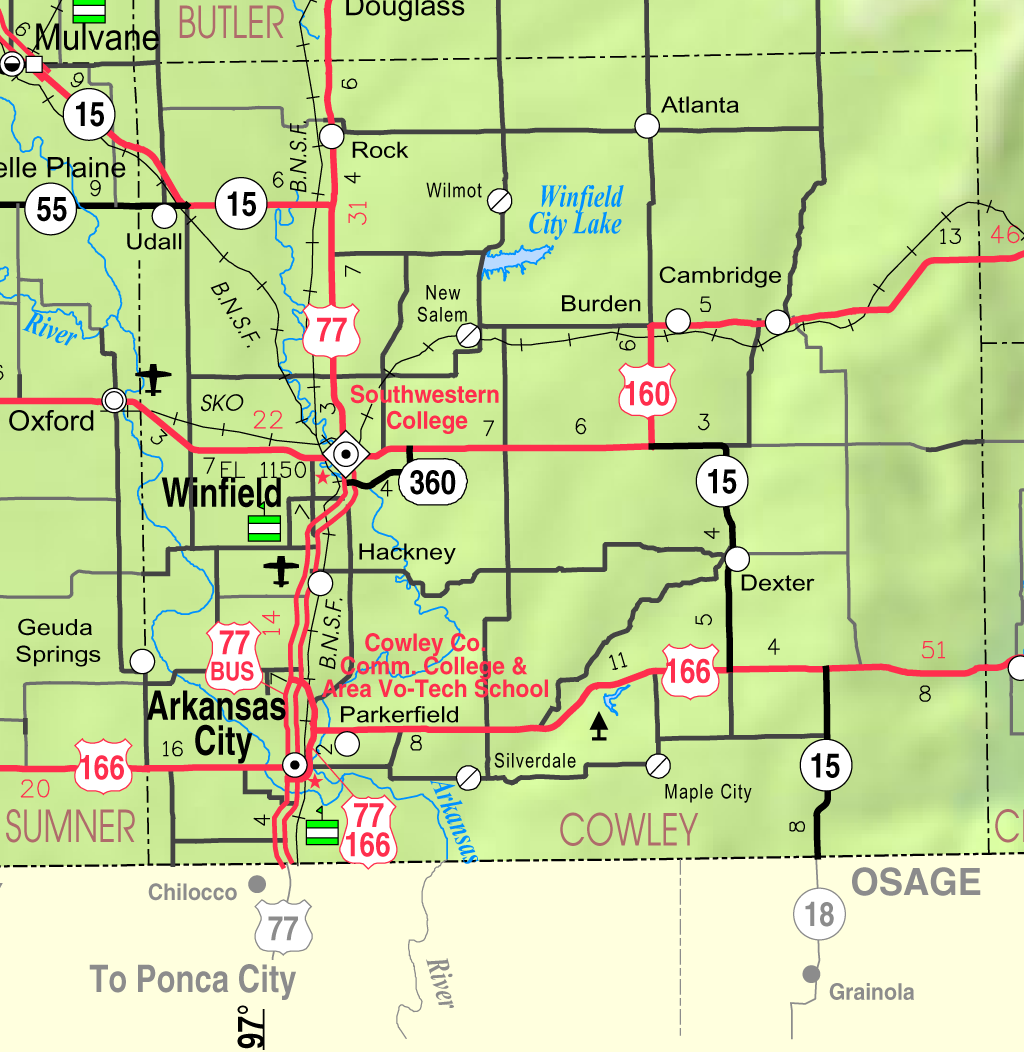
- KDOT map of Cowley County (legend)

- Location within Kansas Location within the United States
- Coordinates: 37°3′21″N 96°46′6″W
- Country: United States
- State: Kansas
- County: Cowley
- Elevation: 1,342 ft (409 m)
- Time zone: UTC-6 (CST)
  - Summer (DST): UTC-5 (CDT)
- ZIP Code: 67102
- Area code: 620
- FIPS code: 20-44475
- GNIS ID: 484425

Maple City is an unincorporated community in Cowley County, Kansas, United States.

== History ==
The post office was established December 16, 1872.

== Education ==
This community is served by Dexter USD 471 public school district.

== Notable people ==
- Ferrell Anderson - former Major League Baseball catcher for parts of two seasons and longtime minor leaguer, was born in Maple City.
- William Martin - Photographer and businessman, originally from Maple City before he moved to Ottawa, Kansas.
