= Atlanta, Kansas =

City in Cowley County, Kansas

- City
- Location within Cowley County and Kansas

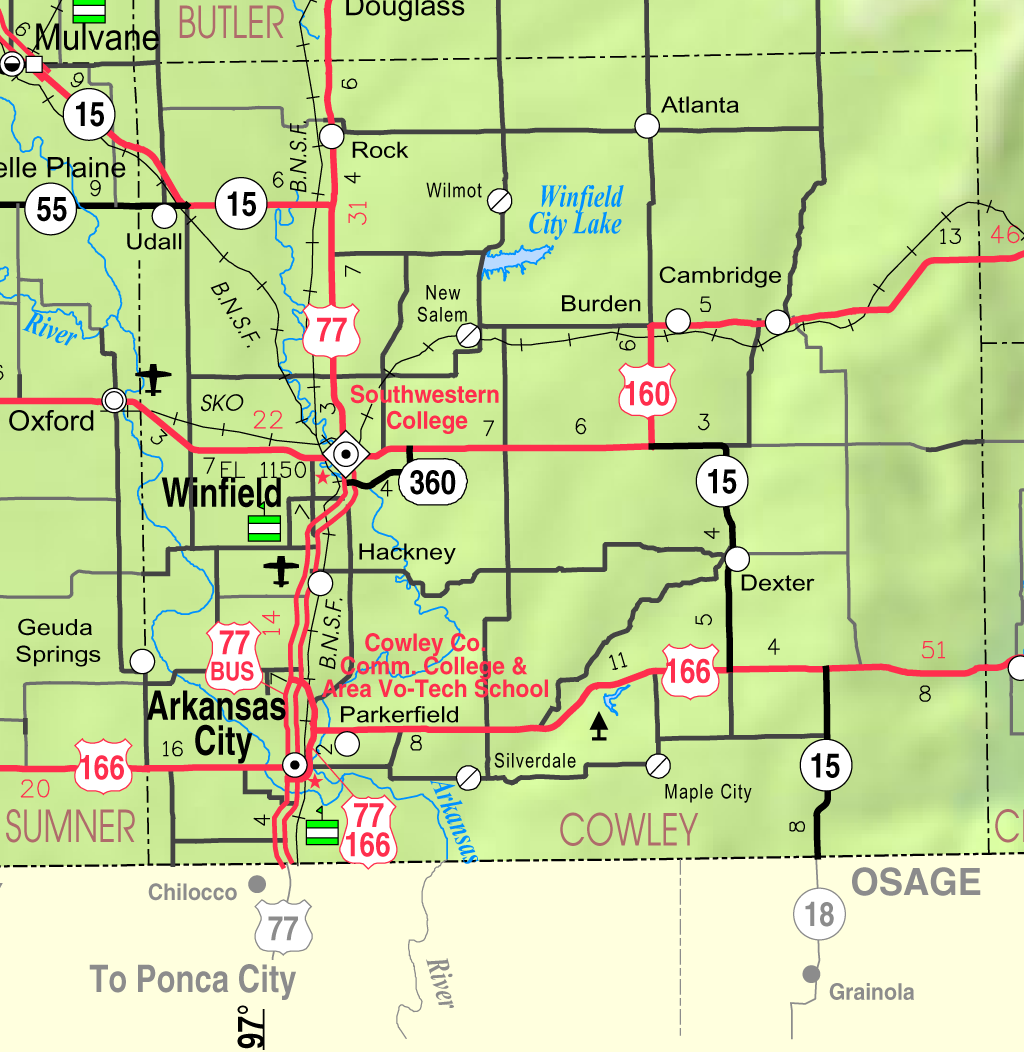
- KDOT map of Cowley County (legend)
- Coordinates: 37°26′09″N 96°46′01″W
- Country: United States
- State: Kansas
- County: Cowley
- Founded: 1885
- Incorporated: 1903

Area
  - Total: 0.48 sq mi (1.24 km^{2})
  - Land: 0.48 sq mi (1.24 km^{2})
  - Water: 0 sq mi (0.00 km^{2})
- Elevation: 1,424 ft (434 m)

Population (2020)
  - Total: 168
  - Density: 351/sq mi (135/km^{2})
- Time zone: UTC-6 (CST)
  - Summer (DST): UTC-5 (CDT)
- ZIP Code: 67008
- Area code: 620
- FIPS code: 20-03050
- GNIS ID: 2394016

Atlanta is a city in Cowley County, Kansas, United States. As of the 2020 census, the population of the city was 168.

== History ==
Atlanta was founded in 1885. The first post office in Atlanta was established on August 14, 1885.

== Geography ==
According to the United States Census Bureau, the city has a total area of 0.50 square miles (1.29 km^{2}), all land.

=== Climate ===
The climate in this area is characterized by hot, humid summers and generally mild to cool winters. According to the Köppen Climate Classification system, Atlanta has a humid subtropical climate, abbreviated "Cfa" on climate maps.

== Demographics ==
Historical population
Census	Pop.	Note	%±
1910	330		—
1920	379		14.8%
1930	348		−8.2%
1940	286		−17.8%
1950	309		8.0%
1960	267		−13.6%
1970	216		−19.1%
1980	256		18.5%
1990	232		−9.4%
2000	255		9.9%
2010	195		−23.5%
2020	168		−13.8%
U.S. Decennial Census

=== 2020 census ===
The 2020 United States census counted 168 people, 71 households, and 41 families in Atlanta. The population density was 350.7 per square mile (135.4/km^{2}). There were 98 housing units at an average density of 204.6 per square mile (79.0/km^{2}). The racial makeup was 93.45% (157) white or European American (91.07% non-Hispanic white), 0.0% (0) black or African-American, 1.79% (3) Native American or Alaska Native, 0.0% (0) Asian, 0.0% (0) Pacific Islander or Native Hawaiian, 0.0% (0) from other races, and 4.76% (8) from two or more races. Hispanic or Latino of any race was 2.38% (4) of the population.

Of the 71 households, 16.9% had children under the age of 18; 43.7% were married couples living together; 26.8% had a female householder with no spouse or partner present. 39.4% of households consisted of individuals and 14.1% had someone living alone who was 65 years of age or older. The average household size was 1.8 and the average family size was 2.2. The percent of those with a bachelor's degree or higher was estimated to be 10.7% of the population.

19.6% of the population was under the age of 18, 8.3% from 18 to 24, 24.4% from 25 to 44, 28.0% from 45 to 64, and 19.6% who were 65 years of age or older. The median age was 43.7 years. For every 100 females, there were 102.4 males. For every 100 females ages 18 and older, there were 95.7 males.

The 2016–2020 5-year American Community Survey estimates show that the median household income was $42,500 (with a margin of error of +/- $11,651) and the median family income was $49,000 (+/- $4,190). Males had a median income of $37,750 (+/- $7,925) versus $20,625 (+/- $18,584) for females. The median income for those above 16 years old was $30,833 (+/- $2,843). Approximately, 2.6% of families and 10.8% of the population were below the poverty line, including 0.0% of those under the age of 18 and 14.8% of those ages 65 or over.

=== 2010 census ===
As of the census of 2010, there were 195 people, 75 households, and 56 families living in the city. The population density was 390.0 inhabitants per square mile (150.6/km^{2}). There were 107 housing units at an average density of 214.0 per square mile (82.6/km^{2}). The racial makeup of the city was 83.1% White, 4.1% Native American, 4.6% from other races, and 8.2% from two or more races. Hispanic or Latino of any race were 13.3% of the population.

There were 75 households, of which 33.3% had children under the age of 18 living with them, 53.3% were married couples living together, 14.7% had a female householder with no husband present, 6.7% had a male householder with no wife present, and 25.3% were non-families. 20.0% of all households were made up of individuals, and 6.6% had someone living alone who was 65 years of age or older. The average household size was 2.60 and the average family size was 3.04.

The median age in the city was 40.4 years. 27.7% of residents were under the age of 18; 7.1% were between the ages of 18 and 24; 22.5% were from 25 to 44; 23.1% were from 45 to 64; and 19.5% were 65 years of age or older. The gender makeup of the city was 51.8% male and 48.2% female.

=== 2000 census ===
As of the census of 2000, there were 255 people, 99 households, and 70 families living in the city. The population density was 507.8 inhabitants per square mile (196.1/km^{2}). There were 116 housing units at an average density of 231.0 per square mile (89.2/km^{2}). The racial makeup of the city was 90.20% White, 5.49% Native American, and 4.31% from two or more races. Hispanic or Latino of any race were 0.39% of the population.

There were 99 households, out of which 29.3% had children under the age of 18 living with them, 56.6% were married couples living together, 9.1% had a female householder with no husband present, and 28.3% were non-families. 28.3% of all households were made up of individuals, and 14.1% had someone living alone who was 65 years of age or older. The average household size was 2.58 and the average family size was 3.07.

In the city, the population was spread out, with 29.4% under the age of 18, 5.9% from 18 to 24, 25.9% from 25 to 44, 24.7% from 45 to 64, and 14.1% who were 65 years of age or older. The median age was 36 years. For every 100 females, there were 94.7 males. For every 100 females age 18 and over, there were 85.6 males.

The median income for a household in the city was $29,375, and the median income for a family was $36,250. Males had a median income of $31,250 versus $19,286 for females. The per capita income for the city was $12,727. About 13.4% of families and 15.5% of the population were below the poverty line, including 18.2% of those under the age of eighteen and 8.8% of those 65 or over.

== Education ==
The community is served by Central USD 462 public school district.

Atlanta High School was closed through school unification. The Atlanta High School mascot was Tigers.

== Notable people ==
The Olympic-medalist runner Glenn Cunningham was born in Atlanta.
