= Ninnescah Township, Cowley County, Kansas =

Ninnescah Township
- Township
- Location in Cowley County
- Coordinates: 37°20′57″N 097°05′29″W
- Country: United States
- State: Kansas
- County: Cowley

Area
  - Total: 35.81 sq mi (92.74 km^{2})
  - Land: 35.78 sq mi (92.66 km^{2})
  - Water: 0.031 sq mi (0.08 km^{2}) 0.09%
- Elevation: 1,260 ft (384 m)

Population (2020)
  - Total: 915
  - Density: 25.6/sq mi (9.87/km^{2})
- GNIS feature ID: 0470572

Ninnescah Township is a township in Cowley County, Kansas, United States. As of the 2020 census, its population was 915.

== Geography ==
Ninnescah Township covers an area of 35.81 square miles (92.7 km^{2}) and contains one incorporated settlement, Udall. According to the USGS, it contains two cemeteries: Ninnescah and Udall.

The streams of Crooked Creek and Stewart Creek run through this township.
