= Bolton Township, Kansas =

Bolton Township
- Township
- Location in Cowley County
- Coordinates: 37°02′00″N 097°03′41″W
- Country: United States
- State: Kansas
- County: Cowley

Area
  - Total: 53.41 sq mi (138.34 km^{2})
  - Land: 52.56 sq mi (136.14 km^{2})
  - Water: 0.85 sq mi (2.19 km^{2}) 1.58%
- Elevation: 1,125 ft (343 m)

Population (2020)
  - Total: 1,434
  - Density: 27.28/sq mi (10.53/km^{2})
- GNIS feature ID: 0470045

Bolton Township is a township in Cowley County, Kansas, United States. As of the 2020 census, its population was 1,434.

== Geography ==
Bolton Township covers an area of 53.41 square miles (138.3 km^{2}) and contains no incorporated settlements. According to the USGS, it contains two cemeteries: Hope and Springside.

The streams of Negro Creek, Spring Creek and Spring Creek run through this township.

== Transportation ==
Bolton Township contains one airport or landing strip, Haines Landing Field.
