= Vernon Township, Kansas =

Vernon Township
- Township
- Location in Cowley County
- Coordinates: 37°16′19″N 097°05′06″W
- Country: United States
- State: Kansas
- County: Cowley

Area
  - Total: 39.68 sq mi (102.78 km^{2})
  - Land: 39.4 sq mi (102.1 km^{2})
  - Water: 0.27 sq mi (0.69 km^{2}) 0.67%
- Elevation: 1,198 ft (365 m)

Population (2020)
  - Total: 431
  - Density: 10.9/sq mi (4.22/km^{2})
- GNIS feature ID: 0470359

Vernon Township is a township in Cowley County, Kansas, United States. As of the 2020 census, its population was 431.

== Geography ==
Vernon Township covers an area of 39.68 square miles (102.8 km^{2}) and contains no incorporated settlements. According to the USGS, it contains two cemeteries: Mount Vernon and Mount Zion.

The stream of Spring Creek runs through this township.

== Transportation ==
Vernon Township contains two airports or landing strips: Oxford Municipal Airport and Richardson Landing Field.
