= Udall, Kansas =

City in Cowley County, Kansas

- City
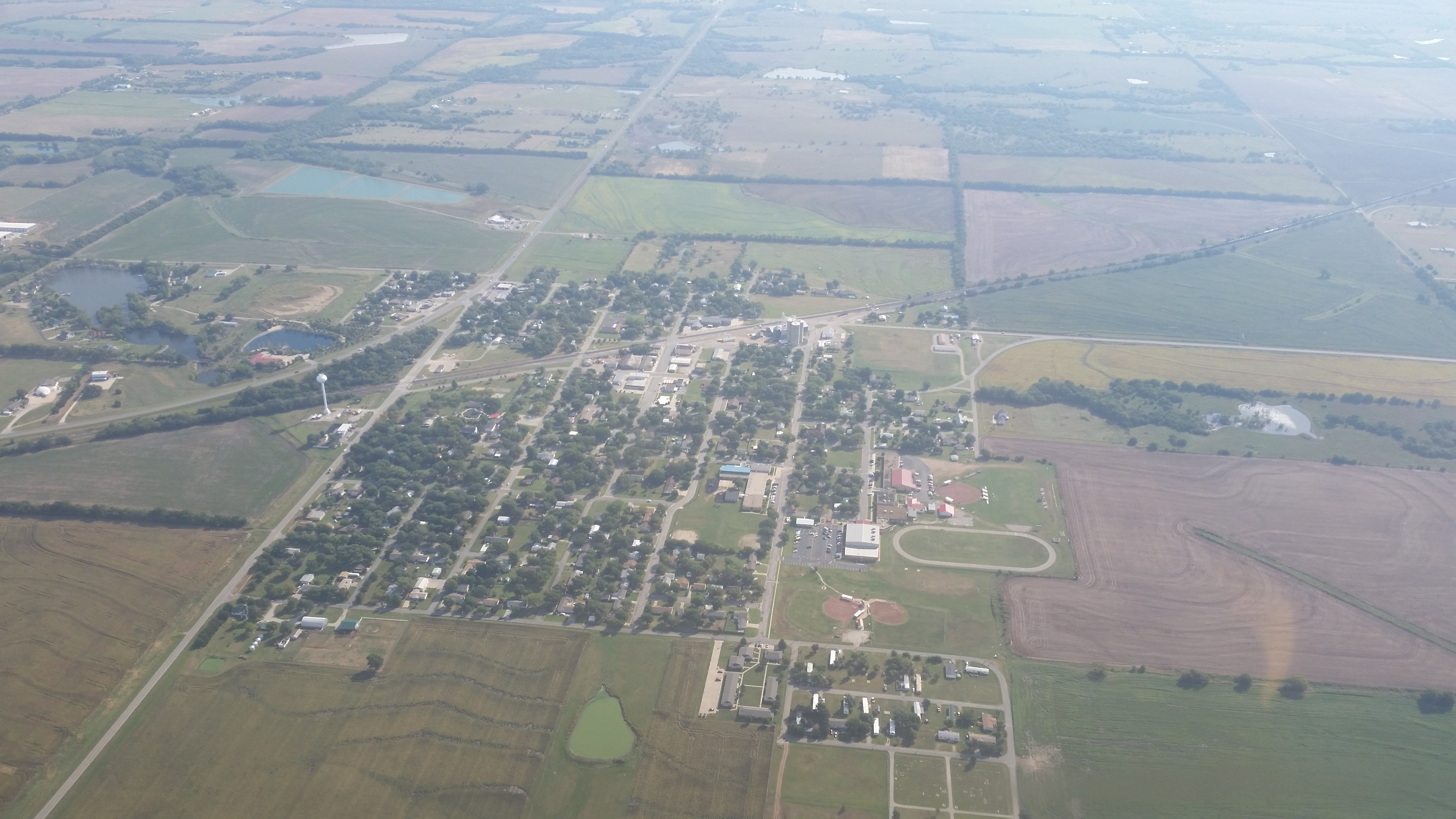
- Aerial photograph of Udall in 2015

- Location within Cowley County and Kansas

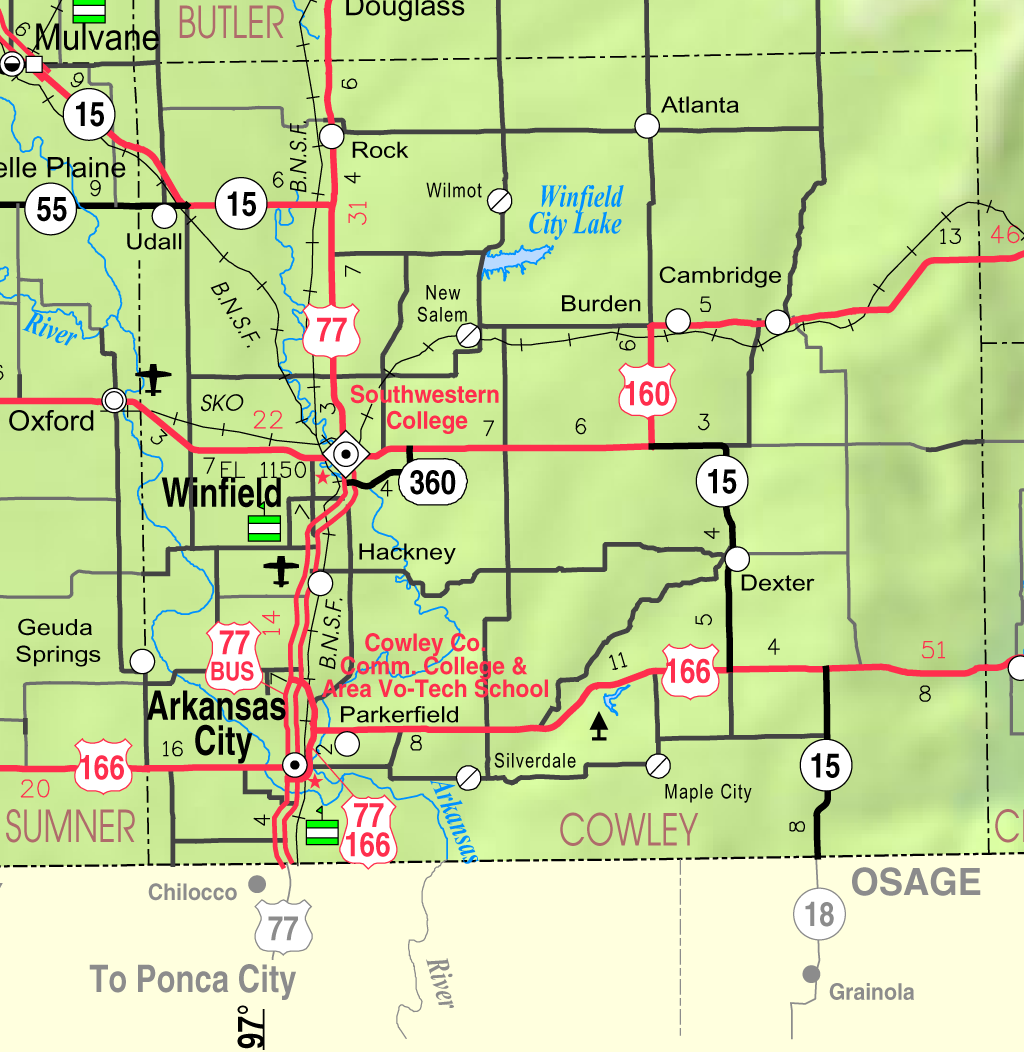
- KDOT map of Cowley County (legend)
- Coordinates: 37°23′21″N 97°07′04″W
- Country: United States
- State: Kansas
- County: Cowley
- Founded: 1870s
- Platted: 1881
- Incorporated: 1881
- Named for: Cornelius Udall

Area
  - Total: 0.54 sq mi (1.41 km^{2})
  - Land: 0.54 sq mi (1.41 km^{2})
  - Water: 0 sq mi (0.00 km^{2})
- Elevation: 1,283 ft (391 m)

Population (2020)
  - Total: 661
  - Density: 1,210/sq mi (469/km^{2})
- Time zone: UTC-6 (CST)
  - Summer (DST): UTC-5 (CDT)
- ZIP Code: 67146
- Area code: 620
- FIPS code: 20-71950
- GNIS ID: 2397077
- Website: cityofudall.com

Udall is a city in Cowley County, Kansas, United States. As of the 2020 census, the population of the city was 661.

== History ==
The first post office at Udall was established in September 1879. J.M. Napier and P.W. Smith purchased a ten-acre tract from I.N Nelson in 1879. Udall was laid out in 1881 by Napier and Smith. It was named after English author Cornelius Udall. D.C. Green built the first house in Udall and opened a store.

=== 1955 tornado ===
On May 25, 1955, after an F5 tornado killed 20 people, injured 250, and destroyed/damaged hundreds of buildings in Blackwell, Oklahoma, the same supercell produced another F5 tornado that struck Udall at 10:35 p.m, the deadliest tornado to ever hit the state of Kansas. A 1,300 yd (0.74 mi) wide F5 tornado demolished Udall; no building within the city limits was untouched, including the grain elevator, water tower, old grade school, new high school, city hall, three churches. The water tower had been knocked over and the streets were flooded. Vehicles were thrown hundreds of yards and mangled beyond recognition, including a pickup truck that was wrapped around a tree and stripped of everything but its frame and tires. In Udall, the tornado killed 77, injured 270, 192 buildings were destroyed, including 170 homes, around 50% of families lost one or more members.

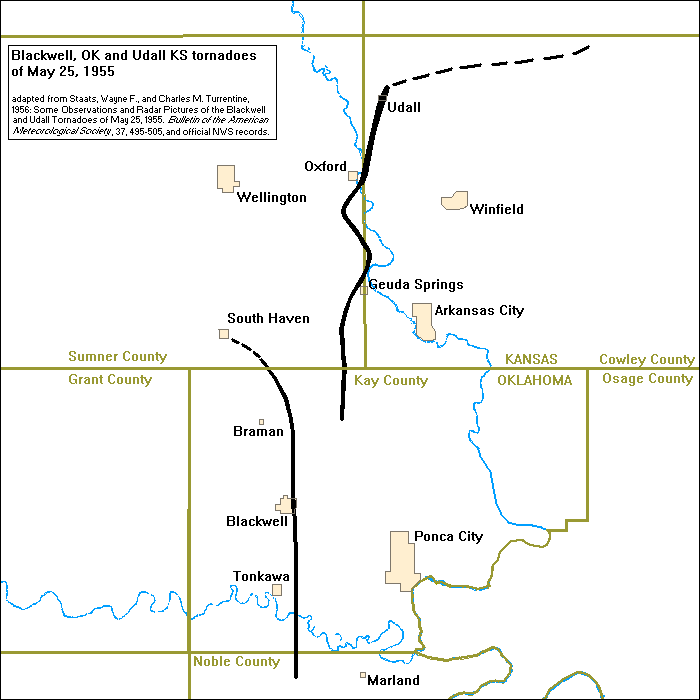
1955 tornado tracks map

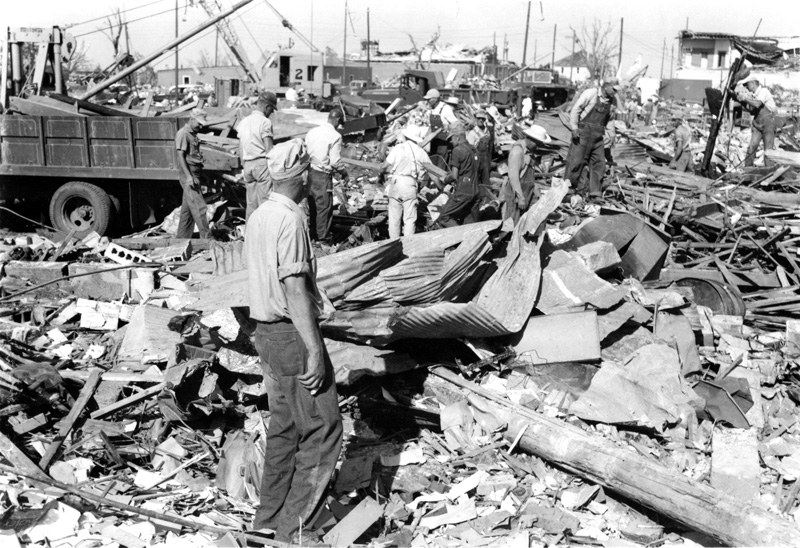
Men helping cleanup after tornado

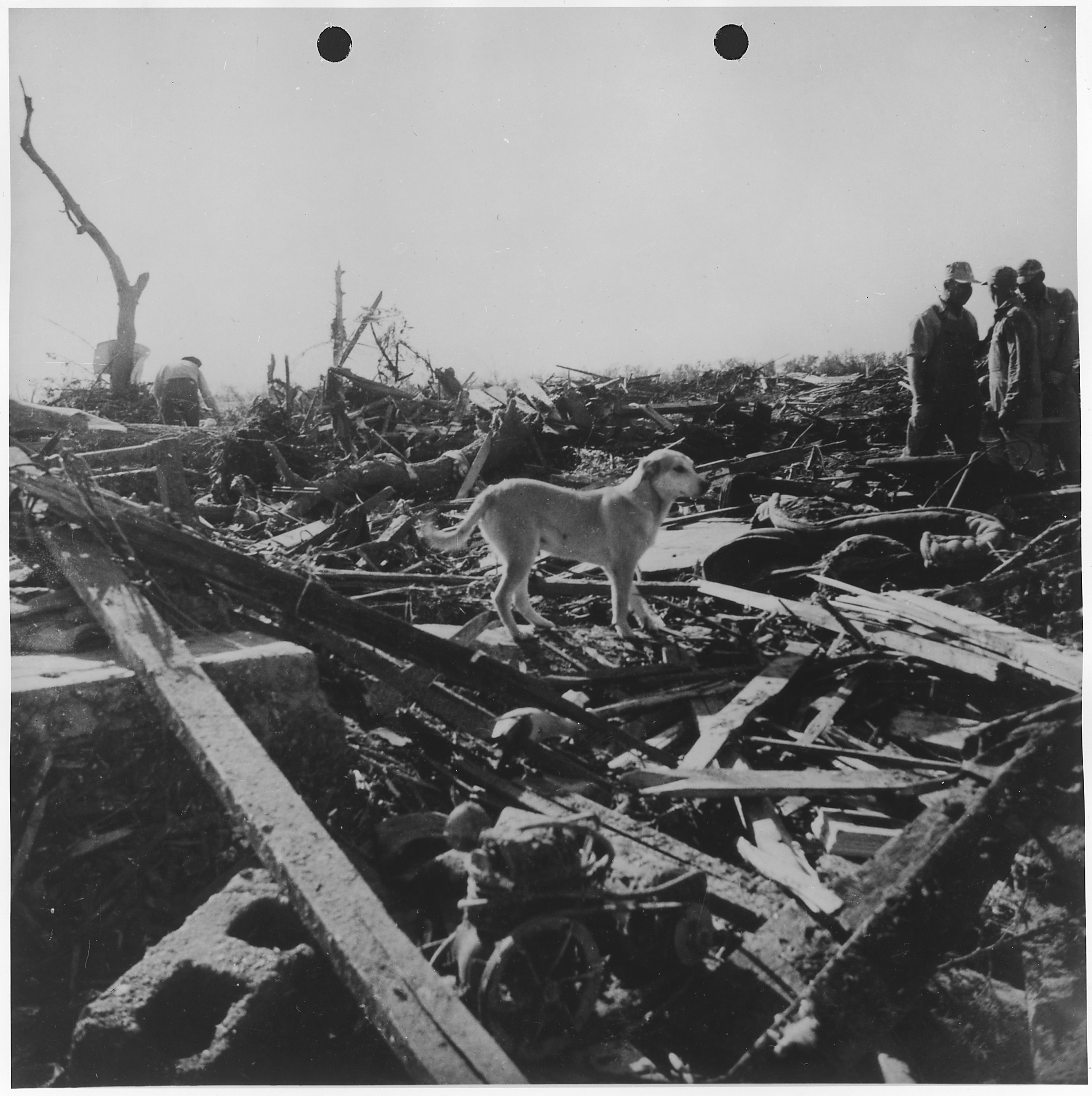
Men and dog inspect tornado rubble

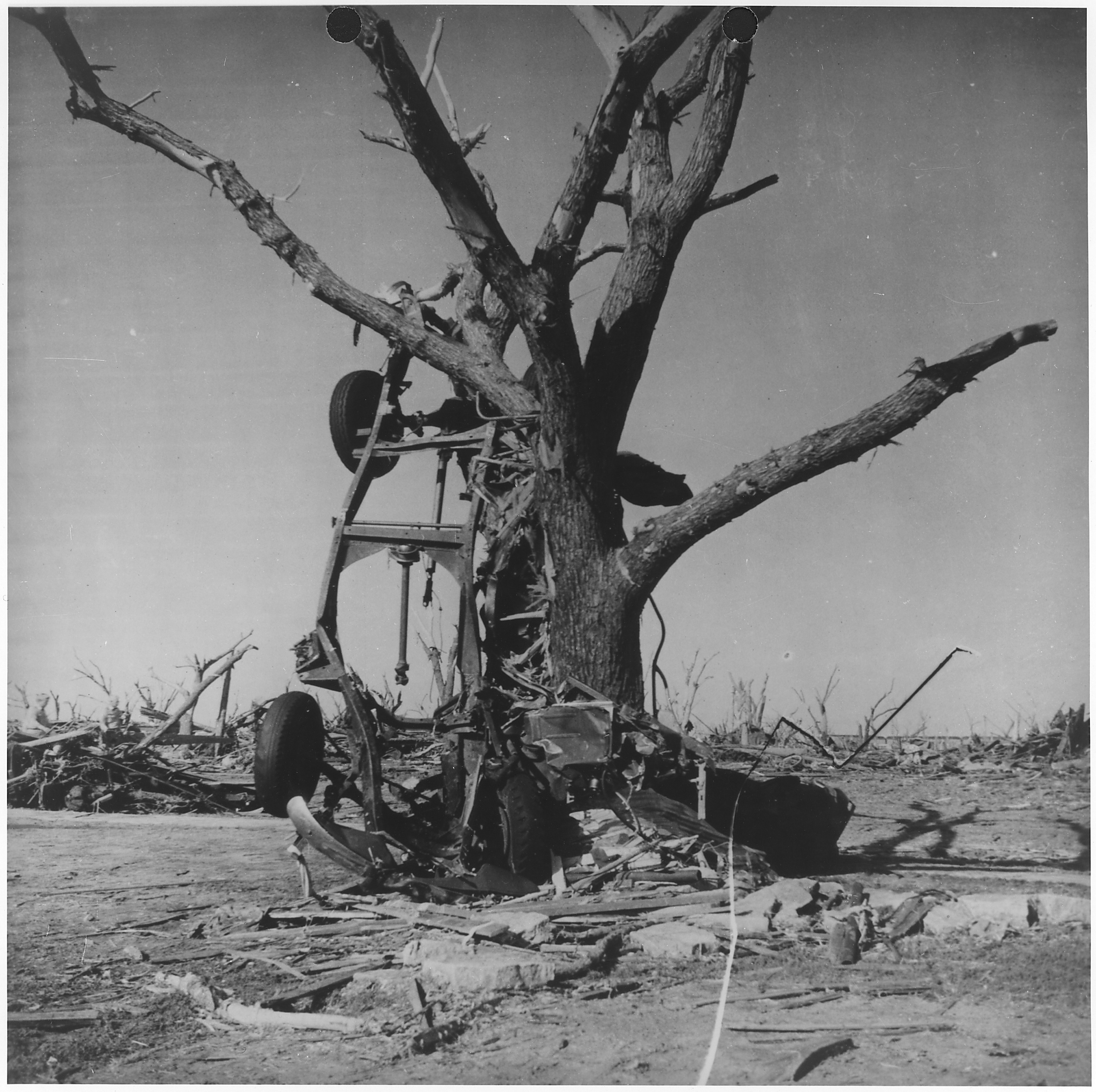
Stripped pickup truck caused by tornado

== Geography ==
According to the United States Census Bureau, the city has a total area of 0.57 square miles (1.48 km^{2}), all land.

== Demographics ==
Historical population
Census	Pop.	Note	%±
1880	85		—
1890	338		297.6%
1900	282		−16.6%
1910	330		17.0%
1920	381		15.5%
1930	436		14.4%
1940	419		−3.9%
1950	410		−2.1%
1960	600		46.3%
1970	668		11.3%
1980	891		33.4%
1990	824		−7.5%
2000	794		−3.6%
2010	746		−6.0%
2020	661		−11.4%
U.S. Decennial Census

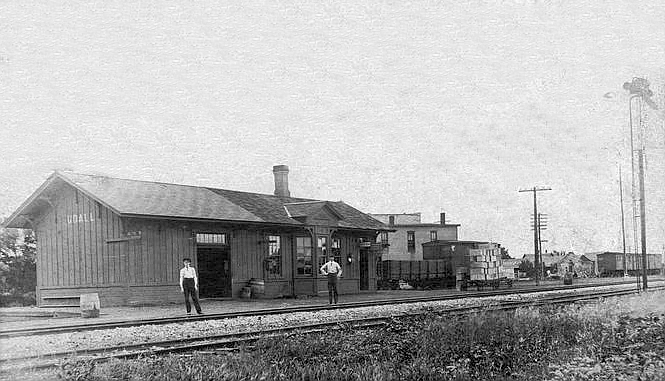
Atchison, Topeka and Santa Fe Railway depot in Udall, circa 1890

=== 2010 census ===
As of the census of 2010, there were 746 people, 289 households, and 203 families residing in the city. The population density was 1,308.8 inhabitants per square mile (505.3/km^{2}). There were 319 housing units at an average density of 559.6 per square mile (216.1/km^{2}). The racial makeup of the city was 94.8% White, 2.0% Native American, 0.1% Asian, 0.5% from other races, and 2.5% from two or more races. Hispanic or Latino of any race were 3.1% of the population.

There were 289 households, of which 38.8% had children under the age of 18 living with them, 51.2% were married couples living together, 13.8% had a female householder with no husband present, 5.2% had a male householder with no wife present, and 29.8% were non-families. 26.3% of all households were made up of individuals, and 11.5% had someone living alone who was 65 years of age or older. The average household size was 2.58 and the average family size was 3.07.

The median age in the city was 31.7 years. 30.4% of residents were under the age of 18; 9.2% were between the ages of 18 and 24; 25.3% were from 25 to 44; 22.5% were from 45 to 64; and 12.5% were 65 years of age or older. The gender makeup of the city was 46.4% male and 53.6% female.

=== 2000 census ===
As of the census of 2000, there were 794 people, 302 households, and 221 families residing in the city. The population density was 1,645.7 inhabitants per square mile (635.4/km^{2}). There were 322 housing units at an average density of 667.4 per square mile (257.7/km^{2}). The racial makeup of the city was 96.73% White, 1.64% Native American, 0.25% Asian, 0.63% from other races, and 0.76% from two or more races. Hispanic or Latino of any race were 3.27% of the population.

There were 302 households, out of which 41.1% had children under the age of 18 living with them, 59.6% were married couples living together, 10.3% had a female householder with no husband present, and 26.8% were non-families. 24.2% of all households were made up of individuals, and 9.9% had someone living alone who was 65 years of age or older. The average household size was 2.63 and the average family size was 3.16.

In the city, the population was spread out, with 32.2% under the age of 18, 10.5% from 18 to 24, 27.7% from 25 to 44, 18.6% from 45 to 64, and 11.0% who were 65 years of age or older. The median age was 28 years. For every 100 females, there were 92.7 males. For every 100 females age 18 and over, there were 94.9 males.

The median income for a household in the city was $37,639, and the median income for a family was $42,981. Males had a median income of $34,750 versus $20,227 for females. The per capita income for the city was $16,202. About 4.8% of families and 5.8% of the population were below the poverty line, including 8.0% of those under age 18 and 8.0% of those age 65 or over.

== Education ==
The community is served by Udall USD 463 public school district.

The Udall Eagles won the Kansas State High School class 1A volleyball championship in 1973.
