= Dexter Township, Kansas =

Dexter Township
- Township
- Location in Cowley County
- Coordinates: 37°12′00″N 096°41′31″W
- Country: United States
- State: Kansas
- County: Cowley

Area
  - Total: 71.44 sq mi (185.02 km^{2})
  - Land: 71.30 sq mi (184.67 km^{2})
  - Water: 0.14 sq mi (0.36 km^{2}) 0.19%
- Elevation: 1,234 ft (376 m)

Population (2020)
  - Total: 374
  - Density: 5.25/sq mi (2.03/km^{2})
- GNIS feature ID: 0469571

Dexter Township is a township in Cowley County, Kansas, United States. As of the 2020 census, its population was 374.

== Geography ==
Dexter Township covers an area of 71.44 square miles (185.0 km^{2}) and contains one incorporated settlement, Dexter.

The streams of Bullington Creek, Deer Creek, Little Crabb Creek and Turkey Creek run through this township.
