= Central USD 462 =

Public school district in Burden, Kansas

Address
- 700 N. Main St. Burden, Kansas, 67019; United States
- Coordinates: 37°19′11″N 96°45′11″W

District information
- Type: Public
- Grades: K to 12
- Accreditation(s): KSHSAA
- Schools: 2

Other information
- Website: usd462.org

Central USD 462 is a public unified school district headquartered in Burden, Kansas, United States. The district includes the communities of Burden, Atlanta, Cambridge, Grenola, Wilmot, and nearby rural areas.

== Schools ==
The school district operates the following schools:

- Central Jr/Sr High School
- Central Elementary School

== See also ==
- Kansas State Department of Education
- Kansas State High School Activities Association
- List of high schools in Kansas
- List of unified school districts in Kansas
