= Dexter USD 471 =

Public school district in Dexter, Kansas

Address
- 311 N. Main St. Dexter, Kansas, 67038; United States
- Coordinates: 37°10′55″N 96°42′56″W

District information
- Type: Public
- Grades: K to 12
- Schools: 1

Students and staff
- Students: 150

Other information
- Website: usd471.org

Dexter USD 471 is a public unified school district headquartered in Dexter, Kansas, United States. The district includes the communities of Dexter, Maple City, and nearby rural areas.

The school mascot is the Cardinals, but for most athletics the district co-ops with nearby Cedar Vale to form the CVD Spartans.

== See also ==
- Kansas State Department of Education
- Kansas State High School Activities Association
- List of high schools in Kansas
- List of unified school districts in Kansas
