= Beaver Township, Cowley County, Kansas =

Beaver Township
- Township
- Location in Cowley County
- Coordinates: 37°10′18″N 097°05′20″W
- Country: United States
- State: Kansas
- County: Cowley

Area
  - Total: 36.25 sq mi (93.88 km^{2})
  - Land: 35.55 sq mi (92.08 km^{2})
  - Water: 0.69 sq mi (1.79 km^{2}) 1.91%
- Elevation: 1,158 ft (353 m)

Population (2020)
  - Total: 212
  - Density: 5.96/sq mi (2.30/km^{2})
- GNIS feature ID: 0470355

Beaver Township is a township in Cowley County, Kansas, United States. As of the 2020 census, its population was 212.

== Geography ==
Beaver Township covers an area of 36.25 square miles (93.9 km^{2}) and contains no incorporated settlements. According to the USGS, it contains two cemeteries: Memorial Lawn and Tannehill.

The streams of Beaver Creek, Beaver Creek and Slate Creek run through this township.

== Transportation ==
Beaver Township contains one airport or landing strip, Strother Field.
