= National Register of Historic Places listings in Cowley County, Kansas =

Location of Cowley County in Kansas

This is a list of the National Register of Historic Places listings in Cowley County, Kansas.

This is intended to be a complete list of the properties and districts on the National Register of Historic Places in Cowley County, Kansas, United States. The locations of National Register properties and districts for which the latitude and longitude coordinates are included below, may be seen in a map.

There are 27 properties and districts listed on the National Register in the county. Another 2 properties were once listed, but have since been removed.

This National Park Service list is complete through NPS recent listings posted November 13, 2026.

== Current listings ==
	Name on the Register	Image	Date listed	Location	City or town	Description
1	Arkansas City Commercial Historic District	Arkansas City Commercial Historic District	October 28, 1983 (#83003599)	Summit St. and 5th Ave. 37°03′39″N 97°02′21″W	Arkansas City	
2	Arkansas City Country Club Site		August 25, 1978 (#78001277)	Eastern side of the Walnut River, on the Arkansas City Country Club; 37°04′27″N 97°00′46″W	Creswell Township	
3	Bryant School	Bryant School	October 4, 2017 (#100001701)	1011 Mansfield St. 37°14′19″N 97°00′04″W	Winfield	
4	Bucher Bridge	Bucher Bridge	July 2, 1985 (#85001420)	Off U.S. Route 77; 37°27′45″N 97°02′19″W	Rock	The Bucher bridge over Eight Mile Creek northwest of Rock, Kansas is 44 feet long and 13 feet wide. Completed in 1905 by Walter Sharp of El Dorado and constructed of solid concrete.
5	W. H. Coffin House	W. H. Coffin House	August 28, 2003 (#03000839)	421 E. 11th Ave. 37°14′18″N 96°59′30″W	Winfield	Built in 1892, the W. H. Coffin House is an example of Queen Anne style architecture in the United States popular from about 1880 to 1900.
6	Cowley County National Bank Building	Cowley County National Bank Building	August 11, 1983 (#83000421)	820-822 Main St. 37°14′25″N 96°59′47″W	Winfield	Completed in 1886 and first occupied as the Farmers' Bank. From 1891 until 1922, it was operated at the Cowley County National Bank. The building was designed in the style of Second Empire architecture by local architects by W. A. Ritchie and W.J. Ritchie. A boundary increase was approved on June 3, 2021.
7	Cowley County Poor Farm - Stone Arch Culvert		September 29, 2026 (#100013459)	Joel Mack Road, approximately 120 feet (37 m) South; 37°13′21″N 96°58′23″W	Winfield vicinity	
8	East Badger Creek Culvert	East Badger Creek Culvert	December 29, 2015 (#15000936)	182nd Rd. approx. .3 mi. E. of 131st Rd. 37°12′55″N 96°54′33″W	Winfield	
9	Esch's Spur Bridge	Esch's Spur Bridge	July 2, 1985 (#85001423)	3 miles south and 3 miles west of Dexter; 37°08′07″N 96°46′52″W	Dexter	
10	First Presbyterian Church		August 12, 2025 (#100012098)	1101 Millington Street; 37°14′17″N 96°59′45″W	Winfield	
11	Grace Methodist Episcopal Church	Grace Methodist Episcopal Church	November 15, 2005 (#05001241)	320 College St. 37°14′48″N 96°58′39″W	Winfield	
12	W. P. Hackney House	W. P. Hackney House	March 7, 1973 (#73000749)	417 E. 10th St. 37°14′21″N 96°59′31″W	Winfield	Completed in 1886, the three-story limestone house is an example of Vernacular architecture. It was home to W. P. Hackney, a prominent lawyer and politician.
13	Magnolia Ranch		March 7, 1973 (#73000750)	10 miles southeast of Winfield on U.S. Route 77; 37°08′03″N 96°55′23″W	Winfield	
14	Old Arkansas City High School	Old Arkansas City High School	November 21, 1974 (#74000824)	300 W. Central St. 37°03′45″N 97°02′29″W	Arkansas City	Now used by Cowley Community College.
15	Pettit Cleaners Building	Pettit Cleaners Building	January 5, 2005 (#04001427)	114 E. 8th Ave. 37°14′29″N 96°59′45″W	Winfield	
16	Pilgrim Congregational Church	Pilgrim Congregational Church	June 8, 2005 (#05000545)	101 N. Third St. 37°03′45″N 97°02′33″W	Arkansas City	
17	St. John's Lutheran College-Baden Hall	St. John's Lutheran College-Baden Hall	January 18, 2011 (#10001138)	Seventh Ave. and College St. 37°14′34″N 96°58′42″W	Winfield	
18	St. John's Lutheran College Girls Dormitory	St. John's Lutheran College Girls Dormitory	January 28, 2002 (#01001544)	6th Ave. and Gary St. 37°14′36″N 96°58′51″W	Winfield	
19	Silver Creek Bridge	Silver Creek Bridge	January 30, 1987 (#86003270)	East of Winfield; 37°12′03″N 96°50′34″W	Winfield	
20	Spring Creek Stone Arch Bridge		October 10, 2023 (#100009416)	Located in West Creswell Township, 2.5 mi. west of Arkansas City on 262nd Rd. 37°06′00″N 97°07′15″W	Arkansas City vicinity	
21	Strother Field Tetrahedron Wind Indicator		April 14, 2015 (#15000143)	22215 Tupper St. (Strother Field); 37°10′09″N 97°02′17″W	Winfield	
22	Weigle Barn		October 11, 2016 (#16000702)	14097 189th Rd. 37°17′02″N 96°48′41″W	Burden	
23	West Dormitory-St. John's College	West Dormitory-St. John's College	December 13, 1991 (#91001769)	1415 E. Sixth Ave. 37°13′50″N 96°46′38″W	Winfield	Rehwinkel Hall, originally known as the West Dormitory, was completed in 1916 as a three-story building with raised basement, facing south on the former St. John's College (Kansas) campus.
24	Wilmer House	Wilmer House	January 31, 2008 (#07001477)	1310 E. 9th Ave. 37°14′27″N 96°58′52″W	Winfield	
25	Winfield Fox Theatre		January 6, 2022 (#100007282)	1007 Main St. 37°14′20″N 96°59′50″W	Winfield	
26	Winfield National Bank Building	Winfield National Bank Building	January 20, 2012 (#11001031)	901 Main St. 37°14′25″N 96°59′51″W	Winfield	
27	Winfield Public Carnegie Library	Winfield Public Carnegie Library	January 11, 1988 (#87002230)	1001 Millington St. 37°14′19″N 96°59′47″W	Winfield	

== Former listings ==
	Name on the Register	Image	Date listed	Date removed	Location	City or town	Description
1	Gladstone Hotel		August 26, 1983 (#83000422)	February 25, 2004	N. Summit Street	Arkansas City	
2	George W. Yount Barn	George W. Yount Barn	May 16, 1997 (#97000436)	December 29, 2015	1 mile east of U.S. Route 77, approximately 2.5 miles north of Winfield; 37°16′49″N 96°59′12″W	Winfield	

== See also ==
- List of National Historic Landmarks in Kansas
- National Register of Historic Places listings in Kansas
