= Arkansas City High School =

Arkansas City High School may refer to:

- Arkansas City High School (Arkansas) - Arkansas City, Arkansas (1910-2005); listed on the National Register of Historic Places (NRHP)
- Arkansas City High School (Kansas) - Arkansas City, Kansas
- Old Arkansas City High School, Arkansas City, Kansas, NRHP-listed
