= Arkansas City USD 470 =

Public school district in Arkansas City, Kansas

Address
- 2545 Greenway Rd. Arkansas City, Kansas, 67005; United States
- Coordinates: 37°5′26″N 97°2′18″W

District information
- Type: Public
- Grades: Pre-K to 12

Other information
- Website: usd470.com

Arkansas City USD 470 is a public unified school district headquartered in Arkansas City, Kansas, United States. The district includes the communities of Arkansas City, Parkerfield, Silverdale, and nearby rural areas.

== History ==
The public school system developed beginning in 1872. The district, throughout its history, did not do racial segregation. The first class of high school students graduated in 1880.

== Schools ==
The school district operates the following schools:

Secondary:

- Arkansas City High School
  - See also: Old Arkansas City High School
- Arkansas City Middle School
  - The first junior high school, built south of an existing vocational training school, was 16-classroom facility with a cost of $100,000. It finished construction in Spring 1918 and had its dedication that May 16. In addition to classrooms and offices, it included an auditorium, a gymnasium, a library, and science laboratories.

Primary:

- Adams Elementary School
- C-4 Elementary School
- IXL Elementary School
- Jefferson Elementary School
- Roosevelt Elementary School
  - It originated as the First Ward School, which began using a brick building in that ward in 1874. It originally housed all grade levels but later became only an elementary school. In 1888 it received an expansion.
- Frances Willard Elementary School
  - It originated in 1885 as the Fourth Ward School and also was known as the Central School. Two classrooms, each in one of two 14 feet (4.3 m) wings, were added to the building in 1924 along with plumbing and heating services and more windows to improve lighting; the construction done by the Wichita company W. H. Underhill, who hired forty workers for the purpose.

Former schools:

- Washington Elementary School
  - It opened in 1887 as Third Ward Elementary School, in a brick and limestone building, equipped with steam heating, on a former hunting grounds. The Grand Rapids, Michigan firm Grand Rapids School and Furniture Company created the furniture used in the school. When the original building was affected by flooding, the school moved to another facility.
- The district's board approved the construction of a vocational/manual training school in 1910, and that facility, which had air circulation systems, was remodeled in 1917.

== See also ==
- Kansas State Department of Education
- Kansas State High School Activities Association
- List of high schools in Kansas
- List of unified school districts in Kansas
