= Louis Weller =

American football player (1904–1979)

Profile
- Position: Halfback

Personal information
- Born: March 2, 1904; Anadarko, Oklahoma Territory, U.S.
- Died: April 17, 1979 (aged 75); Albuquerque, New Mexico, U.S.

Career information
- High school: Chilocco Indian (OK); Arkansas City (KS)
- College: Arkansas City JC; Haskell

Career history
- Boston Redskins (1933); Tulsa Oilers (AFL) (1934)

Awards and highlights
- Second-team All-American (1930); American Indian Athletic Hall of Fame (1972); Kansas Sports Hall of Fame (1977); Cowley College Hall of Fame (2001)

Career statistics
- Games played: 7
- Touchdowns: 2
- Stats at Pro Football Reference

Louis "Rabbit" Weller (March 2, 1904 – April 17, 1979) was a professional football halfback with the Boston Redskins of the National Football League (NFL) in 1933. He was a Native American member of the Caddo tribe. He attended Haskell Institute. In 1972, Weller was a charter inductee into the American Indian Athletic Hall of Fame.

== Early life ==
Weller was born in Anadarko, Oklahoma. He was a multi-sport athlete at Arkansas City High School in Arkansas City, Kansas and then played football for Arkansas City Junior College from 1925 to 1926. During those two seasons, Weller scored 190 total points, which included 28 touchdowns. In 1927, he attended Chilocco Indian School, where he once returned seven punts for touchdowns in one game. After attending Chilocco, Weller was a four-sport athlete at the Haskell Institute. He was the first three-time captain of the Haskell football team, where he scored thirteen touchdowns of 60 yards or more. In 1930, he was selected to the Knute Rockne All-American team and the United Press second-team. One of Weller's most notable performances was in 1930 against the undefeated Oklahoma A&M Cowboys. In that game, he returned a kickoff 90 yards for a touchdown and later returned a punt 95 yards for the winning touchdown in a 13–12 victory. Weller participated in a 1930 charity football game for both teams, representing Chilocco Indian School in the second half and Arkansas City Junior College in the first.

== Other sports ==
Besides football, Weller excelled at other sports, including track and baseball. James Naismith, who invented the sport of basketball in 1891, called Weller "the most expert dribbler I have ever seen."

== Professional career ==
After college, Weller played two years of professional football. In 1933, he played in the National Football League (NFL) for the Boston Redskins under his former coach at Haskell, William Henry "Lone Star" Dietz, as well as with two other American Indian football players, "Chief" Larry Johnson and John Orien Crow. In 1934, he played in the American Football League for the Tulsa Oilers.

== Personal life ==
After retiring from football, Weller worked for the Bureau of Indian Affairs. He died on April 17, 1979, in Albuquerque, New Mexico, following a heart attack he sustained while playing golf with former teammate and former Commissioner of the Bureau of Indian Affairs John Orien Crow.
