= KSOK =

KSOK may refer to:

- KSOK (AM), a radio station (1280 AM) licensed to Arkansas City, Kansas, United States
- KSOK-FM, a radio station (95.9 FM) licensed to Winfield, Kansas
