= Arkansas City Country Club site =

- Arkansas City Country Club Site (14CO3)
- U.S. National Register of Historic Places
- Nearest city: Arkansas City, Kansas
- Area: 109 acres (44 ha)
- NRHP reference No.: 78001277
- Added to NRHP: August 25, 1978

The Arkansas City Country Club Site (14CO3), near Arkansas City, Kansas, United States, is a 109-acre (44 ha) archeological site of prehistoric village with graves/burials. It was listed on the National Register of Historic Places in 1978 for its potential to yield information in the future.

The site is located near the Walnut River, in or near Creswell Township. The site includes man-made mounds, some of which contain burials.

The site was first excavated in 1916. In 1994 and 1996, archaeologists excavating the site consulted with the Wichita and Affiliated Tribes, the likely descendants of the people who built the site.

== See also ==
- Etzanoa
