= KSOK-FM =

- Winfield, Kansas; United States
- Broadcast area: Winfield-Arkansas City-Wellington-Ponca City-Augusta; Southeast Wichita
- Frequency: 95.9 MHz
- Branding: 95.9 Bob FM

Programming
- Format: Variety hits
- Affiliations: Cumulus Media

Ownership
- Owner: Christi & Steve Lungren; (Doxa Wave, LLC)

History
- First air date: 1996
- Former call signs: KKWM (1992-1996); KAZY (1996-2000)
- Call sign meaning: Kansas and Oklahoma

Technical information
- Licensing authority: FCC
- Facility ID: 31893
- Class: C3
- ERP: 15,200 watts
- HAAT: 128 meters
- Transmitter coordinates: 37°4′32.00″N 96°56′13.00″W

Links
- Public license information: Public file; LMS
- Webcast: Listen live
- Website: KSOK-FM Online

KSOK-FM (95.9 FM) is a radio station broadcasting a variety hits format. Licensed to Winfield, Kansas, United States, the station serves southeast of the Wichita area. The station is currently owned by Christi & Steve Lungren, through licensee Doxa Wave, LLC.

== History ==
With the purchase of KSOK, KSOK-FM (now KWLS) and KAZY by Sherman Broadcast Co., KAZY flipped to a country format in mid 2000 and changed its call letters to KSOK-FM, a transfer from the older KSOK-FM, displacing the former classic rock format.

In January 2022, KSOK-FM flipped its format from country to variety hits branded as "95.9 Bob FM". The flip followed Doxa Wave, LLC purchasing the station from Cowley County Broadcasting.
