= Parkerfield, Kansas =

City in Cowley County, Kansas

- City
- Location within Cowley County and Kansas
- Interactive map of Parkerfield, Kansas
- Coordinates: 37°04′04″N 96°59′44″W
- Country: United States
- State: Kansas
- County: Cowley
- Township: Creswell
- Incorporated: 2004

Area
  - Total: 0.91 sq mi (2.36 km^{2})
  - Land: 0.91 sq mi (2.36 km^{2})
  - Water: 0 sq mi (0.00 km^{2})
- Elevation: 1,171 ft (357 m)

Population (2020)
  - Total: 406
  - Density: 446/sq mi (172/km^{2})
- Time zone: UTC-6 (CST)
  - Summer (DST): UTC-5 (CDT)
- ZIP Code: 67005 (Arkansas City)
- Area code: 620
- FIPS code: 20-54560
- GNIS ID: 2396150
- Website: parkerfieldks.org

Parkerfield is a city in Cowley County, Kansas, United States. As of the 2020 census, the population of the city was 406. It is an eastern suburb of Arkansas City.

== History ==
Parkerfield was incorporated as a city of the third class on March 16, 2004, and elections for mayor and city council were held March 30. The decision to incorporate the city grew out of a protest by area residents of neighboring Arkansas City's plan to annex the area. They believed the city codes to be too restrictive and the taxes too high. The residents hired an attorney to fight the annexation. The petition for incorporation was filed with the Cowley County Clerk on January 20, 2004, and was approved by the Board of County Commissioners on March 9.

== Geography ==
Parkerfield is located near the eastern edge of Arkansas City. The land topography consists of approximately 564 acres (261 acres platted and 302 acres (1.22 km^{2}) unplatted at the time of incorporation) with basically a flat terrain with no natural boundaries and a drainage pattern generally to the southeast for the southern half of the area and to the northwest for the northern half of the area.

According to the United States Census Bureau, the city has a total area of 0.94 square miles (2.43 km^{2}), all land.

== Demographics ==
Historical population
Census	Pop.	Note	%±
2010	426		—
2020	406		−4.7%
U.S. Decennial Census

The city was incorporated on March 16, 2004, thus its first census was the 2010 census.

=== 2020 census ===
The 2020 United States census counted 406 people, 157 households, and 121 families in Parkerfield. The population density was 444.7 per square mile (171.7/km^{2}). There were 158 housing units at an average density of 173.1 per square mile (66.8/km^{2}). The racial makeup was 89.9% (365) white or European American (86.45% non-Hispanic white), 0.0% (0) black or African-American, 1.72% (7) Native American or Alaska Native, 1.72% (7) Asian, 0.0% (0) Pacific Islander or Native Hawaiian, 0.99% (4) from other races, and 5.67% (23) from two or more races. Hispanic or Latino of any race was 5.42% (22) of the population.

Of the 157 households, 27.4% had children under the age of 18; 66.2% were married couples living together; 15.3% had a female householder with no spouse or partner present. 17.8% of households consisted of individuals and 10.8% had someone living alone who was 65 years of age or older. The average household size was 2.8 and the average family size was 3.0. The percent of those with a bachelor's degree or higher was estimated to be 17.5% of the population.

24.4% of the population was under the age of 18, 6.7% from 18 to 24, 19.7% from 25 to 44, 22.9% from 45 to 64, and 26.4% who were 65 years of age or older. The median age was 44.4 years. For every 100 females, there were 100.0 males. For every 100 females ages 18 and older, there were 93.1 males.

The 2016–2020 5-year American Community Survey estimates show that the median household income was $91,250 (with a margin of error of +/- $20,119) and the median family income was $103,750 (+/- $35,462). Males had a median income of $77,763 (+/- $44,465) versus $27,917 (+/- $6,901) for females. The median income for those above 16 years old was $32,096 (+/- $8,129). Approximately, 2.5% of families and 4.4% of the population were below the poverty line, including 8.9% of those under the age of 18 and 4.3% of those ages 65 or over.

=== 2010 census ===
As of the census of 2010, there were 426 people, 156 households, and 125 families residing in the city. The population density was 453.2 inhabitants per square mile (175.0/km^{2}). There were 158 housing units at an average density of 168.1 per square mile (64.9/km^{2}). The racial makeup of the city was 95.5% White, 0.2% African American, 1.2% Native American, 1.6% Asian, 0.7% from other races, and 0.7% from two or more races. Hispanic or Latino of any race were 1.9% of the population.

There were 156 households, of which 32.7% had children under the age of 18 living with them, 71.8% were married couples living together, 3.8% had a female householder with no husband present, 4.5% had a male householder with no wife present, and 19.9% were non-families. 16.0% of all households were made up of individuals, and 7.7% had someone living alone who was 65 years of age or older. The average household size was 2.73 and the average family size was 2.99.

The median age in the city was 47.1 years. 25.8% of residents were under the age of 18; 5.2% were between the ages of 18 and 24; 15% were from 25 to 44; 35.5% were from 45 to 64; and 18.5% were 65 years of age or older. The gender makeup of the city was 50.7% male and 49.3% female.

== Government ==
Parkerfield is incorporated as a city of the third class and, as such, receives services from Creswell Township and Cowley County. Governmental services are provided through the acquisition of water from a rural water district, private sewage systems, fire protection from a rural fire district, law enforcement from the Cowley County Sheriff's Department, and road maintenance by the township and the county. The city is run by an elected mayor and five-member city council, and an appointed city clerk and city treasurer—all unpaid positions.

== Education ==
The community is served by Arkansas City USD 470 public school district.
