= Weigle Barn =

- U.S. National Register of Historic Places
- Location within Kansas Location within the United States
- Location: 14097 189th Rd., in or near Burden, Kansas
- Coordinates: 37°17′02″N 96°48′41″W
- Area: Less than one acre
- Built: c. 1890, c. 1920
- Built by: Jacob Weigle
- NRHP reference No.: 16000702
- Added to NRHP: October 11, 2016

Weigle Barn was listed on the National Register of Historic Places in 2016.

It was built in c. 1890 by Jacob Weigle as a bank barn. A gable-roof barn addition was added in c. 1920.
