= Arkansas City High School (Kansas) =

Location
- 1200 West Radio Lane; Arkansas City, Kansas 67005; United States; 37°5′12″N 97°3′16″W

Information
- School type: Public, High School
- Established: 1880
- School district: Arkansas City USD 470
- CEEB code: 170110
- Principal: Ryan Taylor
- Teaching staff: 54.00 (FTE)
- Grades: 9–12
- Gender: coed
- Enrollment: 866 (2023–2024)
- Student to teacher ratio: 16.04
- Colors: Purple, gold, and white
- Team name: Bulldogs
- Rival: Winfield High School
- Website: hs.usd470.com

Arkansas City High School is a public high school in Arkansas City, Kansas, United States. It is operated by Arkansas City USD 470 school district. Similar to the nickname for the city, the high school is usually referred to as “Ark City”.

== History ==
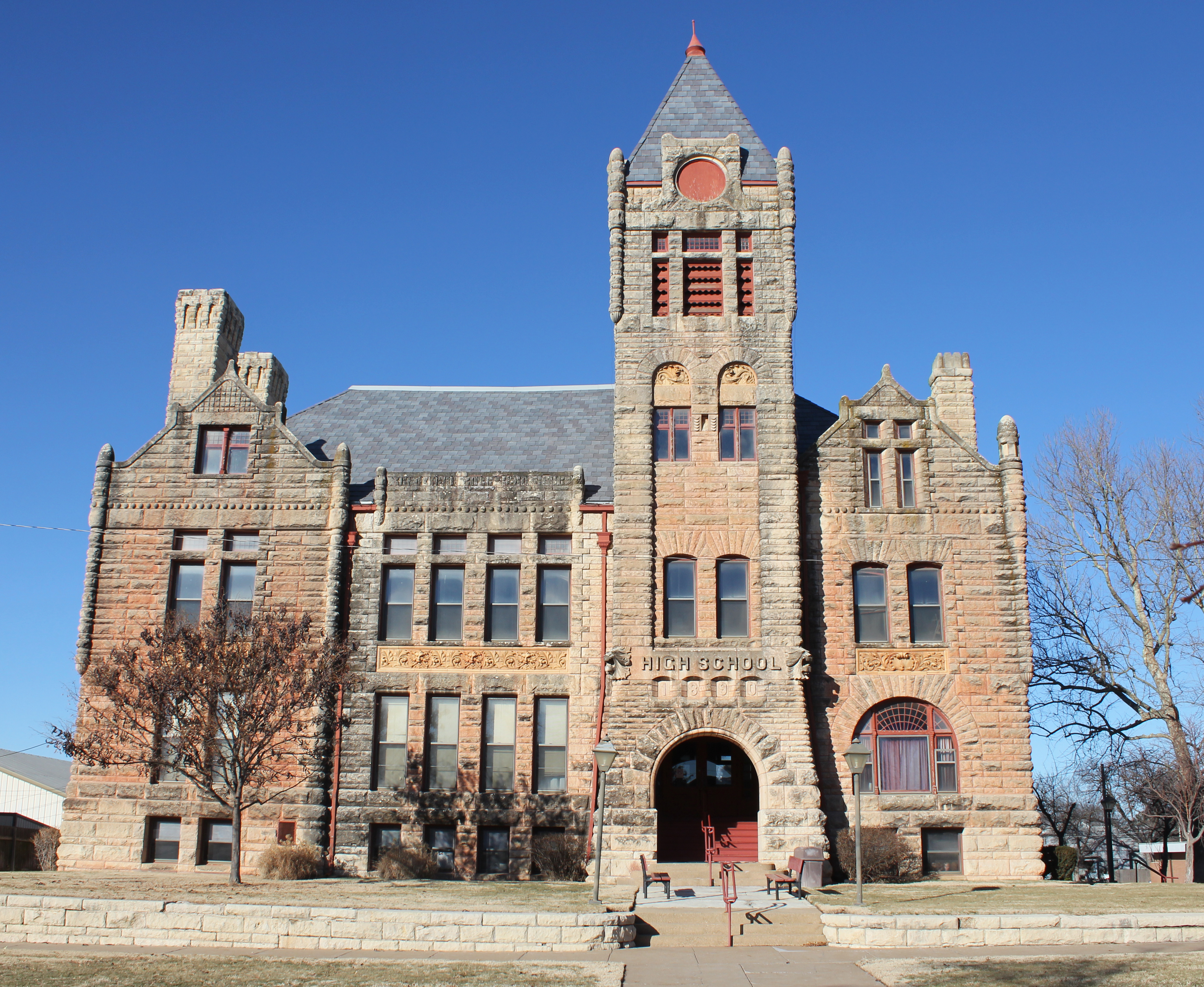
Old Arkansas City High School building, now Ireland Hall on the Cowley Community College campus

During the early days of many new communities, church buildings were used for multiple purposes until other facilities could be built. On June 4, 1880, the first Arkansas City High School graduating class had its commencement at the First United Methodist Church. The district rented space in a former boarding house owned by H. P. Farrar in the period 1888 to 1891 to use for high school classes. The building got the nickname "Bed Bug Hall" due to the discovery of the pests.

From September 7, 1892 to 1922, high school classes were held in what is now known as Old Arkansas City High School. In 1893 the principal was L. E. Eddy and there were a total of three faculty. Cowley Community College was established in 1922 as the Arkansas City Junior College and, for thirty years, its facilities were in the basement of the Old Arkansas City High School building, one of the oldest remaining buildings in Arkansas City. It is listed on the National Register of Historic Places as "Old Arkansas City High School" and is Cowley College's Ireland Hall.

In 1922, students moved to a "new" high school.

== Athletics ==
The first athletic activities were a girls' basketball team organized by chemistry and physics teacher Roxana Oldroyd. In 1906 the boys' basketball team was created.

The tennis team and softball team have won several state championships. Arkansas City native Darren Daulton played fourteen seasons with the Philadelphia Phillies, in one of which they won the 1993 National League pennant, and three with the Florida Marlins, with whom he won the 1997 World Series. He was inducted into the Kansas Sports Hall of Fame in 2006. Quarterback Jack Mitchell was an All-American in 1948 and the MVP of the 1949 Sugar Bowl.

=== State championships ===
State Championships
Season	Sport	Number of Championships	Year
Fall	Cross Country, Boys	2	1987, 1988
Fall	Golf, Girls	2	1994, 1995
Fall	Football	1	1979
Winter	Basketball, Boys	1	1918
Winter	Basketball, Girls	1	^1914
Winter	Wrestling	21	1964, 1966, 1969, 1970, 1982, 1988, 1989, 1990, 1991, 1992, 1993, 1994, 1995, 1996, 1997, 1998, 2000, 2003, 2012, 2013, 2018
Spring	Baseball	2	2002, 2018
Spring	Golf, Boys	2	1962, 1995
Spring	Softball	4	1996, 2000, 2006, 2007
Spring	Tennis, Boys	3	1989, 1990, 1992
Spring	Tennis, Girls	2	1997, 2016
Spring	Track & Field, Boys	2	1932, 1988
Total		42	
^No official KSHSAA records for girls basketball exist before 1973

== Notable alumni ==
- Darren Daulton (1962–2017), baseball player for the Philadelphia Phillies and Florida Marlins
- Frank Davis (1905–1987), writer and poet
- Howard Engleman (1919–2011), college basketball player for University of Kansas from 1939 to 1941
- Les Miller, former professional football player
- Jack Mitchell, former All-American quarterback for the Oklahoma Sooners and college coach
- Scott Taylor (born 1966), professional baseball player
- Louis Weller, pro football player
- Monroe Work (1866–1945), sociologist and historian

== See also ==
- List of high schools in Kansas
- List of unified school districts in Kansas
