= Arkansas City Commercial Historic District =

Historic district in Kansas, United States

- U.S. National Register of Historic Places
- U.S. Historic district
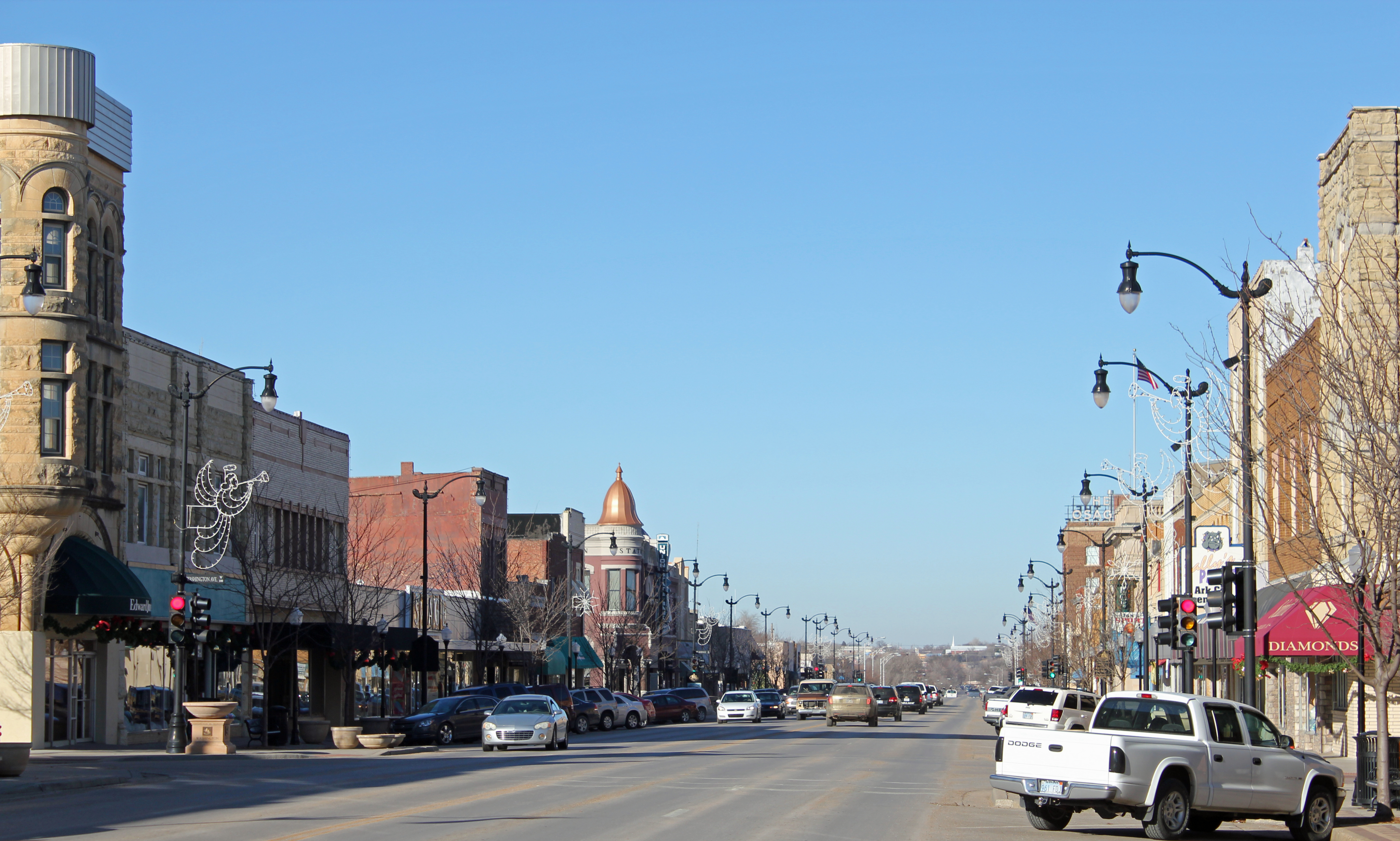

- Location within Kansas Location within the United States
- Location: Summit St. and 5th Ave., Arkansas City, Kansas
- Coordinates: 37°03′39″N 97°02′21″W
- Area: 21 acres (8.5 ha)
- Architectural style: Classical Revival, Italianate, Queen Anne
- NRHP reference No.: 83003599
- Added to NRHP: October 28, 1983

The Arkansas City Commercial Historic District is a 21 acres (8.5 ha) historic district at Summit St. and 5th Ave. in Arkansas City, Kansas which was listed on the National Register of Historic Places in 1983. It included 58 contributing buildings.

It includes Classical Revival, Italianate, and Queen Anne architecture.

According to its NRHP nomination,

The district is worthy of recognition beyond the local realm for its association with an event of national significance, the Cherokee Strip Run of September 16, 1893. As one of the few gateways for the start of this run, Arkansas City played an integral role in the settlement of the Cherokee Strip which is seen by many historians as marking the close of the American frontier. For years before the federal government opened the .Cherokee strip, there had been speculation about its availability for settlement. Anticipating the Run, would-be settlers moved to Arkansas City, swelling its population and adding to the boom atmosphere which had begun a few years earlier when depots were established by five railroad companies.

== See also ==
- Cherokee Strip (Kansas)
