= Overend & Boucher =

Overend & Boucher was an American architectural firm; Schmidt, Boucher & Overend was a related firm.

A number of its works are listed on the National Register of Historic Places.

Works include (with variations in attribution):

- Brown Building, 105 S Broadway St., Wichita, Kansas (Schmidt, Boucher & Overend), NRHP-listed
- Ellis-Singleton Building, 221 S Broadway, Wichita, Kansas (Schmidt, Boucher & Overend), NRHP-listed
- One or more works in Farmer's and Banker's Historic District, 1st & Market Sts., Wichita, Kansas (Overend & Boucher; Dieter & Wenzel), NRHP-listed
- St. John's Lutheran College Girls Dormitory, 6th Ave and Gary St., Winfield, Kansas (Overend & Boucher), NRHP-listed
- Washington County Courthouse, 214 C St., Washington, Kansas (Overend and Boucher), NRHP-listed
- The Hillcrest Apartment Building, 115 S Rutan, Wichita, Kansas (Overend & Boucher)
