= KACY =

Radio station in Arkansas City, Kansas

- Arkansas City, Kansas; United States
- Frequency: 102.5 MHz
- Branding: 102.5 The River

Programming
- Format: Classic hits

Ownership
- Owner: Tornado Alley Communications, LLC

History
- First air date: 1999 (as KLPQ)
- Former call signs: KLPQ (1996–2000)

Technical information
- Licensing authority: FCC
- Facility ID: 77876
- Class: A
- ERP: 6,000 watts
- HAAT: 100 meters (330 ft)
- Transmitter coordinates: 37°5′1″N 96°55′46″W

Links
- Public license information: Public file; LMS
- Webcast: Listen Live
- Website: 1025theriver.com

KACY (102.5 FM) is a radio station licensed in Arkansas City, Kansas, United States, broadcasting a classic hits format. The station is owned by Tornado Alley Communications, LLC.

== History ==
Third Coast Broadcasting General Manager/Broadcast Engineer Bob Fisher put KLPQ on the air on August 26, 1999. On August 26, 2000, the station changed its call letters to KACY. Previously, the KACY call letters which are branded as a reference to Arkansas City were previously used by an AM station in Lafayette, Louisiana, with "Acadiana" branding.
