= Willie Oates =

American philanthropist, social activist and politician

Will Etta Long Oates (January 14, 1918 – March 4, 2008) was an American philanthropist, social activist and politician in the state of Arkansas. She was known as the "Hat Lady" for her large collection of flamboyant hats.

== Early life and family ==
Oates was born in Arkansas City, Kansas, the daughter of Harry L. Long (1889-1974), a pharmacist who served several terms as mayor of Arkansas City, and Roberta Fern Jorden Long (1894–1983). She entered the University of Arkansas in Fayetteville in 1938, graduating in 1941 with a degree in foreign languages. While she was there she was a member of over twenty student organizations, many of which she helped organize, and was a cheerleader. Even after her graduation, she was known for "calling the Hogs" at the homecoming games. She met her husband, doctor Gordon P. Oates (1915–1999), at the university; they were married in 1941 and had two children.

Oates also went to modeling school. She became particularly known for her collection of hats and put them to good use in skits for fundraising.

== Career ==
Following World War II, she became deeply involved in a variety of philanthropic and volunteer organizations. She helped found the Salvation Army auxiliary in Arkansas, she organized the first Arkansas chapter of the American Cancer Society, and an auxiliary to support CARTI, an Arkansas cancer treatment organization. She travelled around Arkansas speaking, performing skits wearing her signature hats, and grand marshalling parades. She was the first woman to be a member of the Little Rock Founders' Lions Club, and the first woman to be president of the club. In 1959–1960 she served one term in the Arkansas House of Representatives, where she introduced the first motorcycle helmet law and also legislation to allow the teaching of the theory of evolution in Arkansas public schools. The legislation on teaching evolution was controversial at the time and led to her not seeking another term.

== Death ==
Oates died on March 4, 2008, in Little Rock, Arkansas. She and her husband are buried in the Roselawn Memorial Park in Little Rock.

== Awards and honors ==
In 1955 she was honored as Little Rock's "Woman of the Year". She was given a Distinguished Citizen Award in 1981, the University of Arkansas' Community Service Award for Outstanding Alumni in 1992, the Salvation Army Lifetime Achievement Award in 1995, the Senator David Pryor Award for Seniors in Community and Volunteer Service in 1997, and the United Cerebral Palsy National Achievement Award. She received public service awards from seven Arkansas governors, and was on a first-name basis with many of them. She was one of the Arkansas citizens selected to carry the Olympic torch in 1996. In 1989 the Arkansas General Assembly proclaimed her "Arkansas' Hat Lady". She visited the Clintons in the White House during the Clinton administration.
