= St. John's College (Kansas) =

Former Lutheran college in Winfield, Kansas

St. John's Evangelical Lutheran College
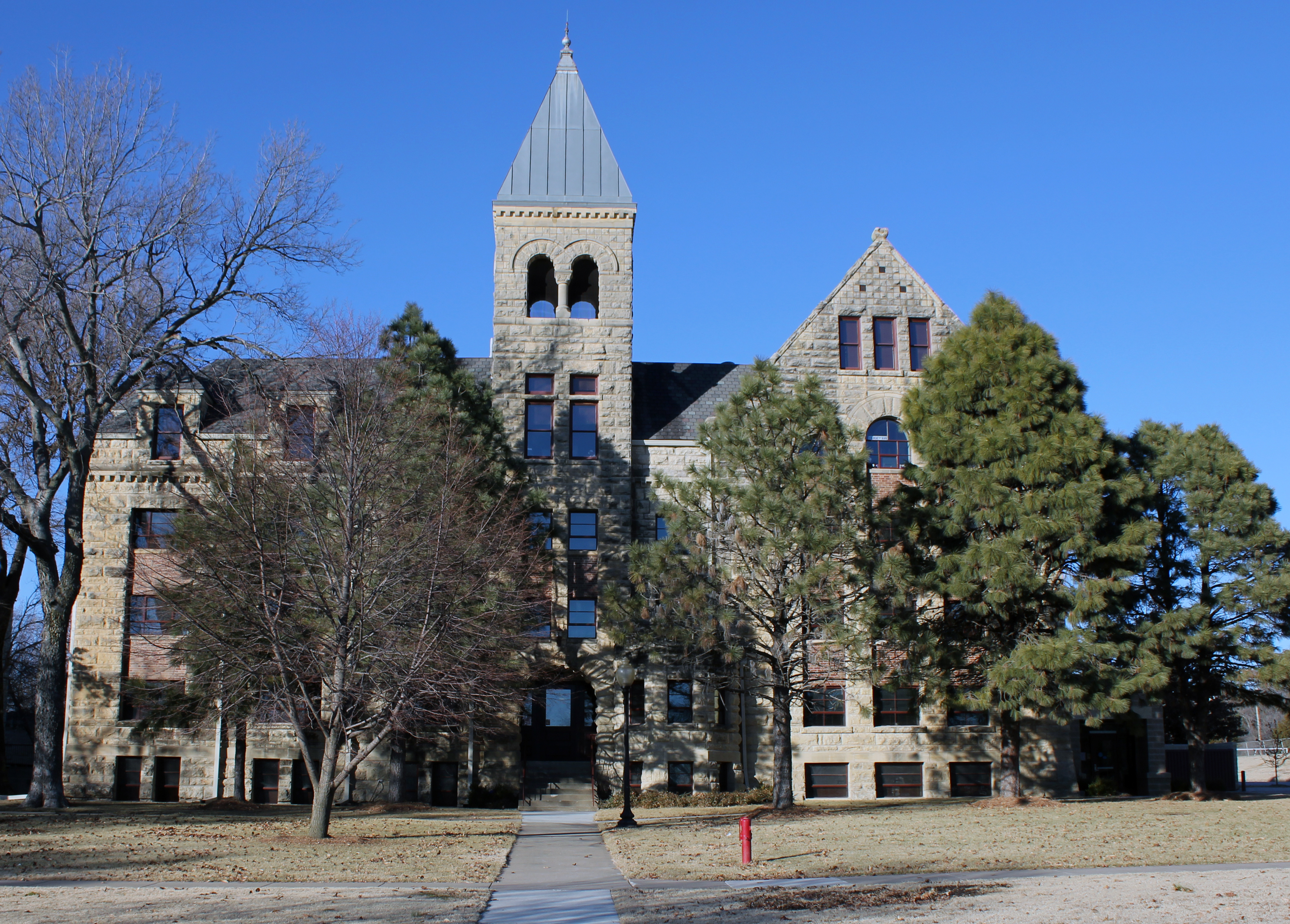
- Baden Hall, the original building of St. John's Lutheran College
- Active: 1893–1986
- Religious affiliation: English Synod (1893-1908); LCMS (1908-1986)
- Location: Winfield, Kansas, United States; 37°14′35.2″N 96°58′50.9″W

St. John's College was a two-year college located in Winfield, Kansas, and was operated by the Lutheran Church–Missouri Synod (LCMS). The school began operation in 1893 under the English Evangelical Lutheran Synod of Missouri and Other States and ceased operation in 1986, after over 9,000 students had been through its programs.

The college facilities now make up what is called "Baden Square", named to honor the college founder John Peter Baden. The City of Winfield uses the facilities for civic functions and municipal activities. Mundinger Hall, Rehwinkel Hall, and Baden Hall are each individually listed on the National Register of Historic Places.

== History ==
In the early 1890s, John Peter Baden, a wealthy Lutheran businessman in Winfield, donated $50,000 to create a college. A site in the eastern part of the city was selected for the construction of a 60-by-100-foot (18 m × 30 m) two-story stone building (Baden Hall) with an attic and a basement. The cornerstone was laid in June 1893 and construction was completed on March 1, 1894. Classes started in September 1893 with a five-member faculty, meeting in temporary quarters during construction.

The institution consisted of both a two-year college and four-year high school academy. While the training of men for the ministry was a focus of the school, Baden also wanted to provide a Christian education for both men and women entering secular occupations. The school was under the control of the English Evangelical Lutheran Synod of Missouri and Other States. In 1911, that synod merged with the German Evangelical Lutheran Synod of Missouri, Ohio, and Other States (today's LCMS).

For the first 20 years, Baden Hall was the only building on the campus, providing classrooms, administrative offices, dormitory space, and a dining hall. In 1916, a men's dormitory, Rehwinkel Hall, was built, and in 1925, a main classroom and administrative building, Meyer Hall, was added. A gymnasium was erected in 1940. The two wings of Mundinger Hall, the women's dormitory, were opened in 1950 and 1953, respectively.

Enrollment peaked in 1951 with 467 students. A college library building and a new gymnasium opened in 1961, and an additional men's dormitory, Timothy Hall, opened in 1965. The high school academy was closed in 1971 in order to concentrate finances on the college. The LCMS wanted to consolidate the college with its other schools, but the college administration was able to forestall that option for several years. Finally, during the spring 1986 semester, the school announced that it would be closing at the end of the semester.

== Redevelopment of the campus ==
Since 1988, when the City of Winfield purchased the campus and renamed it Baden Square, efforts have been made to utilize each of the buildings.

The Community Center is occupied by the Winfield Arts & Humanities Council, offering classes and workshops, with a gallery of year-round exhibitions. The office of Cowley County Council on Aging is also located in the Community Center.

The Winfield Recreation Commission moved to Baden Square in 1989 and their offices are located at Thornton Gym.

The Winfield Public Library moved to its present location in the college library building at Baden Square in 1990.

Timothy Hall is owned by TFI Family Services, Inc. TFI is a statewide not-for-profit agency that provides child welfare and behavioral services to meet the needs of the families and children of Kansas.

Cowley County Community College purchased Stevenson Hall in 1997, using it as its Winfield Outreach Facility.

Meyer Hall renovations were completed by the City of Winfield in January 2000. Each of the 3 floors were gutted. New common areas, elevator, accessible entrances, and restrooms were built. Creative Community Living serves as the anchor tenant, leasing nearly 10,000 square feet for office and activity rooms. Winfield Community Theater held its first production in the newly restored auditorium in June 2003.

Rehwinkel Hall was purchased by MetroPlains Development in 1993 and rehabilitated. It was opened February 1994 as a 36-unit Senior/Low Income Assisted Housing facility.

MetroPlains Development also purchased Mundinger Hall, Mundinger Hall #2, and the adjoining parking lot. Thirty-six general occupancy apartments were completed. In conjunction with the renovation, the City built a new 47 space parking lot on the former faculty housing site of the campus along 7th Avenue.

MetroPlains Development expanded its presence on Baden Square again in 2011 by purchasing Baden Hall. Renovations included a new accessible entrance, elevator, along with 24 newly constructed 1, 2, and 3 bedroom apartments. The city constructed a 57 space parking lot south of Baden Hall to serve tenants and the public.

== Presidents ==
St. John's had eight presidents during its existence.

- Henry Sieck (1893–1895)
- A. W. Meyer (1895–1928)
- Alfred A. Rehwinkle (1928–1936)
- Carl S. Mundinger (1938–1958)
- Reuben C. Beisel (1959-1972)
- Mike Stelmachowicz (1973-1979)
- Gordon Beckler (1980-1983
- Erich Helge (1985-1986)

== Athletics ==
The St. John's athletic teams were called the Eagles. The college was a member of the National Association of Intercollegiate Athletics (NAIA), primarily competing as an NAIA Independent from 1923–24 to 1985–86. The Eagles previously competed in the Kansas Collegiate Athletic Conference from 1902–03 to 1922–23.
