= W. H. Coffin House =

Historic house in Kansas, United States

- W.H. Coffin House
- U.S. National Register of Historic Places
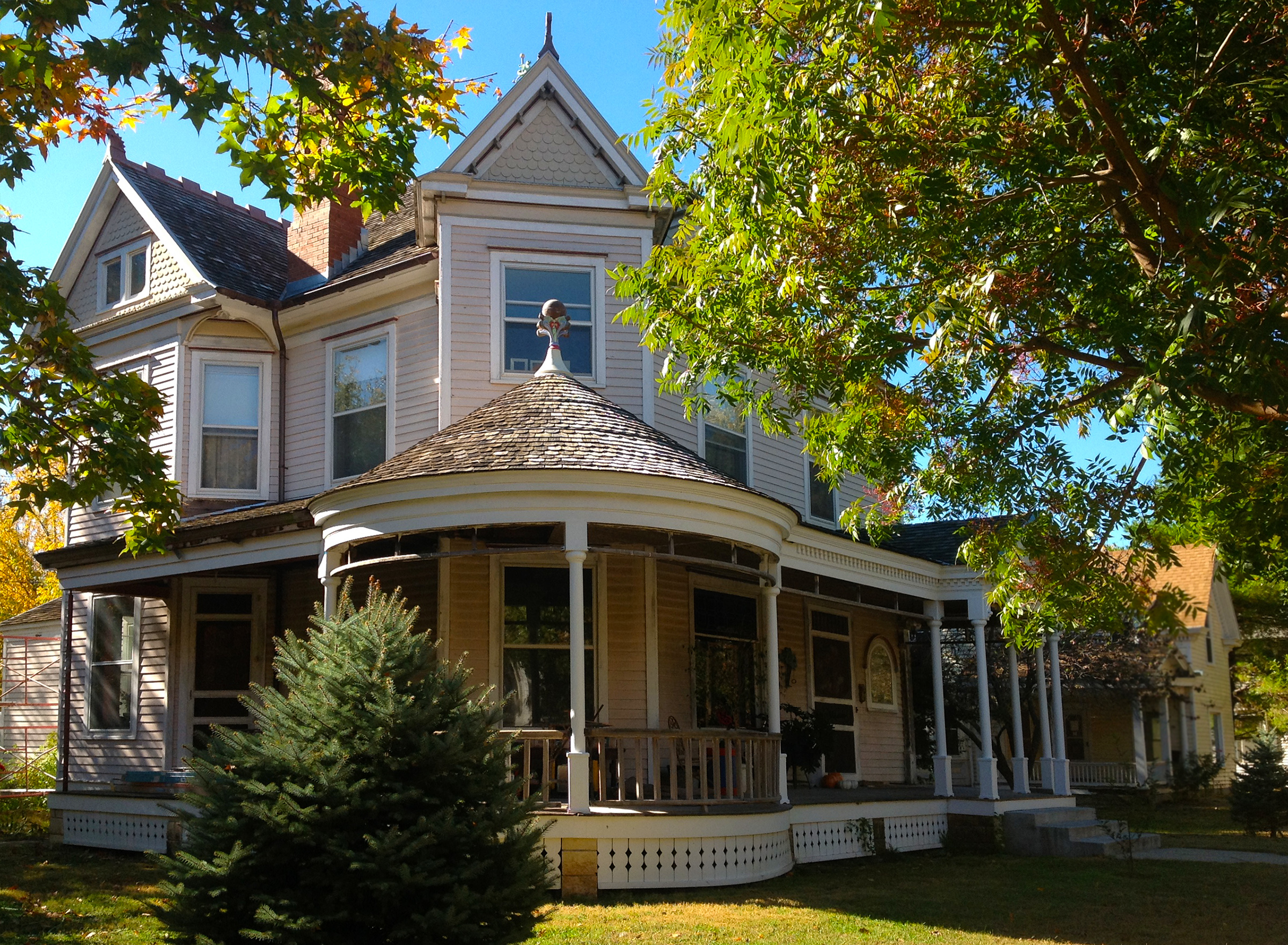

- Location within Kansas Location within the United States
- Location: 421 E. 11th Ave,, Winfield, Kansas
- Coordinates: 37°14′18″N 96°59′30″W
- Area: less than one acre
- Built: 1892
- Architect: Klausner, Emanuel
- Architectural style: Queen Anne
- NRHP reference No.: 03000839
- Added to NRHP: August 28, 2003

The W. H. Coffin House, located at 421 E. 11th Ave. in Winfield in Cowley County, Kansas, was listed on the National Register of Historic Places in 2003.

Built in 1892, the W. H. Coffin House is an example of Queen Anne style architecture in the United States popular from about 1880 to 1900.

It is a two-story cedar weatherboard-clad frame house upon a limestone foundation. It has gables with fish scale shingles made from cedar.
