= Bucher Bridge =

- U.S. National Register of Historic Places
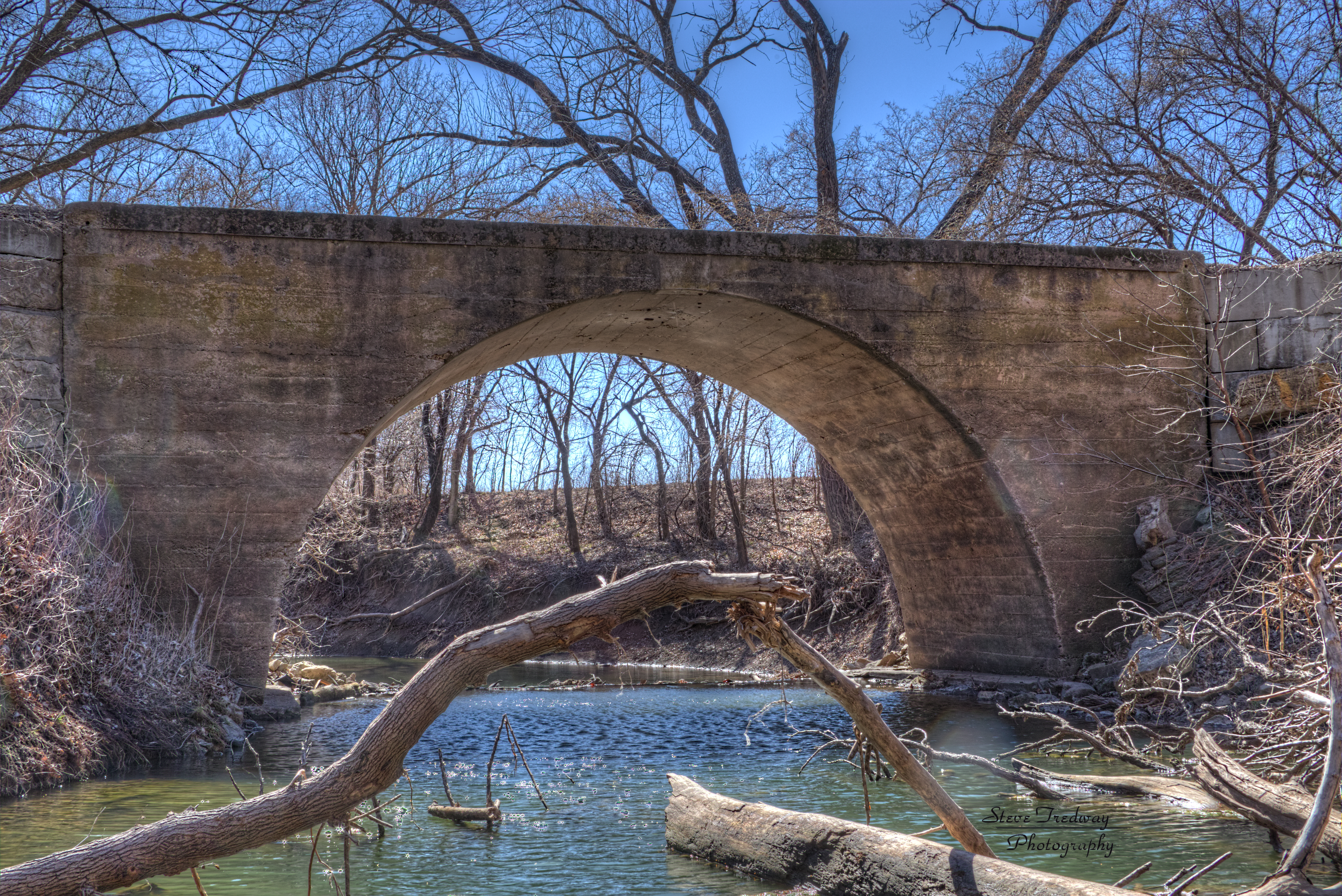

- Location within Kansas Location within the United States
- Location: Off U.S. Route 77, near Rock, Kansas
- Coordinates: 37°27′45″N 97°2′19″W
- Area: less than one acre
- Built: 1905
- Built by: Walter Sharp Bridge Co.
- Architectural style: Reinforced Concrete Arch
- MPS: Masonry Arch Bridges of Kansas TR
- NRHP reference No.: 85001420
- Added to NRHP: July 2, 1985

The Bucher Bridge, located off U.S. Route 77 near the town of Rock in Cowley County, Kansas, was listed on the National Register of Historic Places in 1985. It is located about 1.5 miles (2.4 km) north and 1.75 miles (2.82 km) west of Rock.

Also known as Eight Mile Creek Bridge, the bridge crosses Eight Mile Creek. It is 44 feet (13 m) long and 13 feet (4.0 m) wide. It was completed in 1905 by Walter Sharp of El Dorado and constructed of solid concrete. It is a concrete arch bridge, and is possibly reinforced by steel. It has short limestone wing walls.

It is possibly just the second bridge of this type built by Walter Sharp, who was experimenting. The township did not complete the approaches to the bridge, so people in the area who would use the bridge got together and built the approaches.
