= Rock, Kansas =

Unincorporated community in Cowley County, Kansas

- CDP
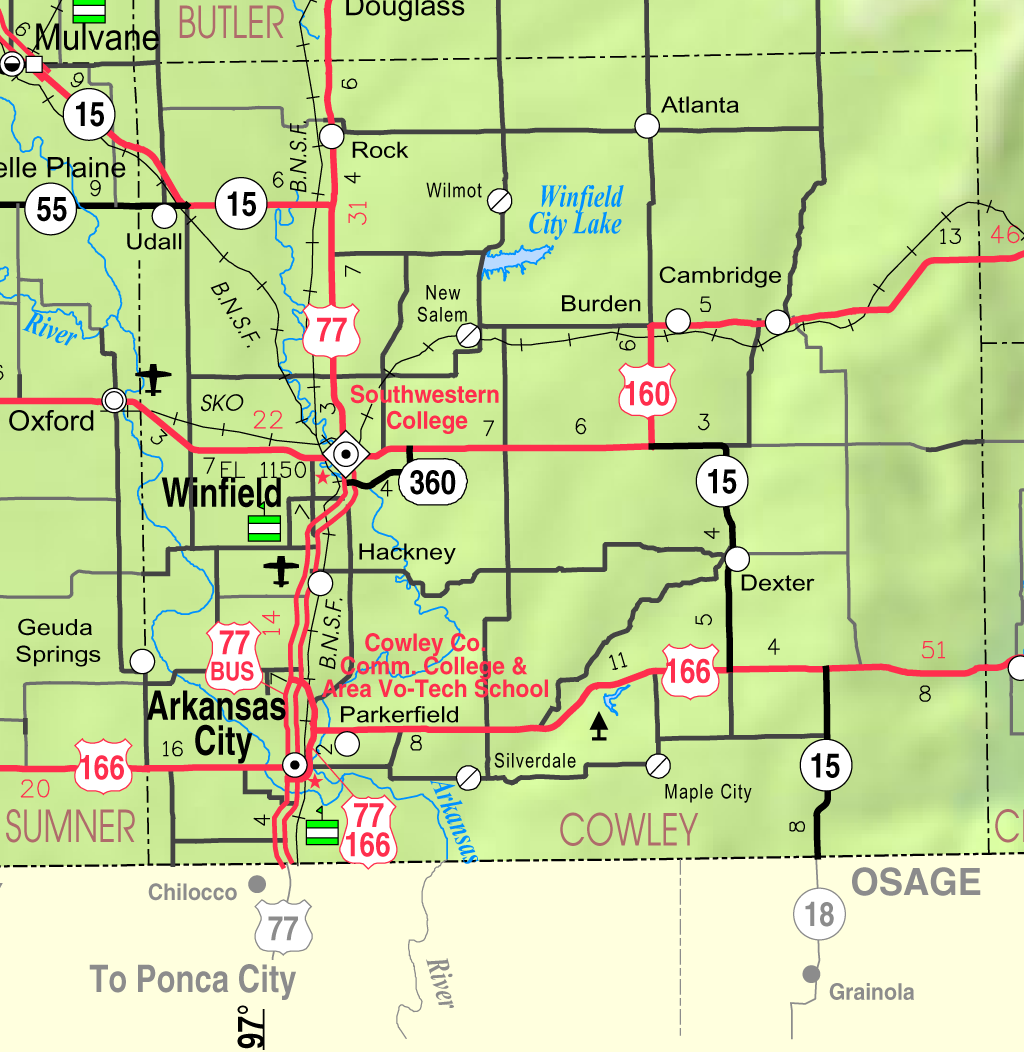
- KDOT map of Cowley County (legend)

- Location within Kansas Location within the United States
- Coordinates: 37°26′25″N 97°0′23″W
- Country: United States
- State: Kansas
- County: Cowley
- Elevation: 1,175 ft (358 m)

Population (2020)
  - Total: 94
- Time zone: UTC-6 (CST)
  - Summer (DST): UTC-5 (CDT)
- ZIP Code: 67131
- Area code: 620
- FIPS code: 20-60400
- GNIS ID: 470206

Rock is a census-designated place (CDP) in Cowley County, Kansas, United States. As of the 2020 census, the population was 94.

== History ==
=== 19th century ===
The post office was established on August 12, 1870.

In 1877, the Florence, El Dorado, and Walnut Valley Railroad Company built a branch line from Florence to El Dorado; in 1881 it was extended to Douglass, and later to Arkansas City. The line was leased and operated by the Atchison, Topeka and Santa Fe Railway. The line from Florence to El Dorado was abandoned in 1942. The original branch line connected Florence, Burns, De Graff, El Dorado, Augusta, Douglass, Rock, Akron, Winfield and Arkansas City.

=== 20th century ===
In 1905, the nearby Bucher Bridge, on the National Register of Historic Places, was built.

On August 24, 1978, the community was evacuated when a major oxidizer spill at a Titan II ICBM site (533-7) 2.5 miles south of Rock. The spill resulted in the deaths of two airmen who were based out of the 381st Strategic Missile Wing, McConnell Air Force Base, approximately 20 miles away.

=== 21st century ===
In 2010, the Keystone XL Pipeline was constructed about 2.5 miles west of Rock, north to south through Butler County, with much controversy over tax exemption and environmental concerns (if a leak ever occurs). A pumping station named Rock was built along the pipeline.

== Demographics ==
Historical population
Census	Pop.	Note	%±
2020	94		—
U.S. Decennial Census

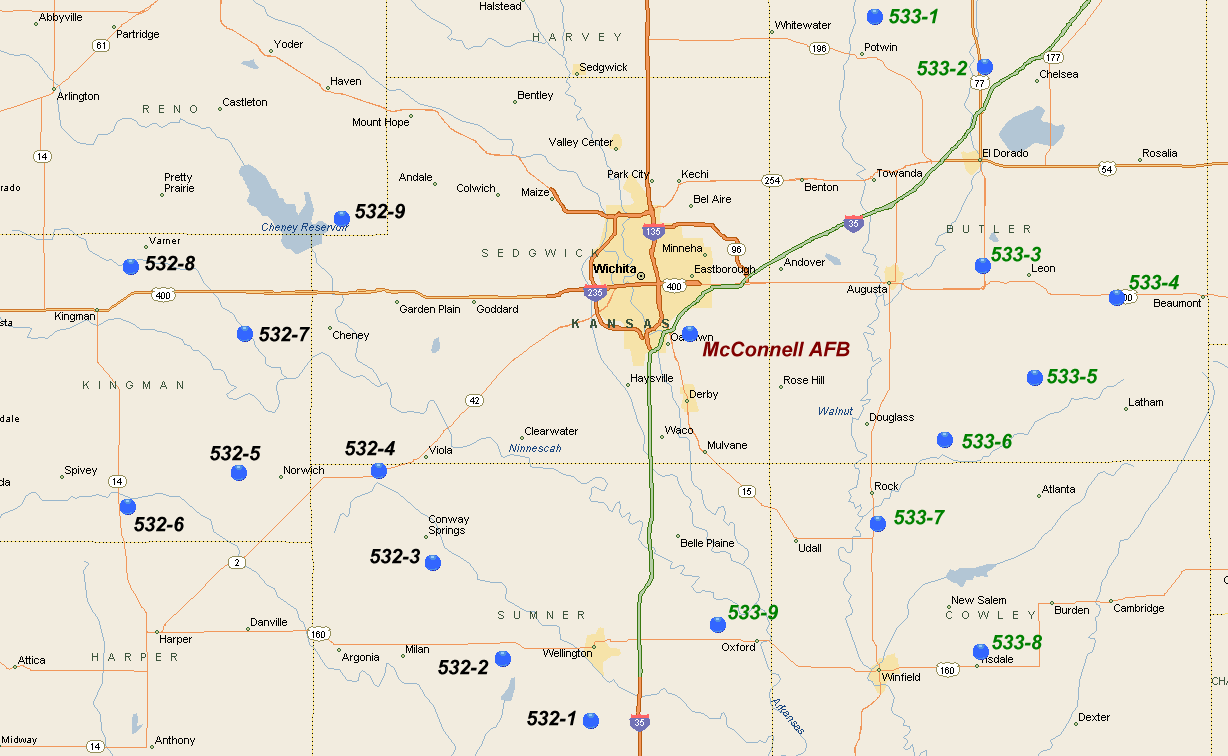
Map of former Titan II Missile sites around Wichita, active from early-1960s to mid-1980s. Site 533-7 was located 2.5 miles south of Rock.

== Education ==
The community is served by Udall USD 463 public school district.
