= Wilmer House =

Historic house in Kansas, United States

- U.S. National Register of Historic Places
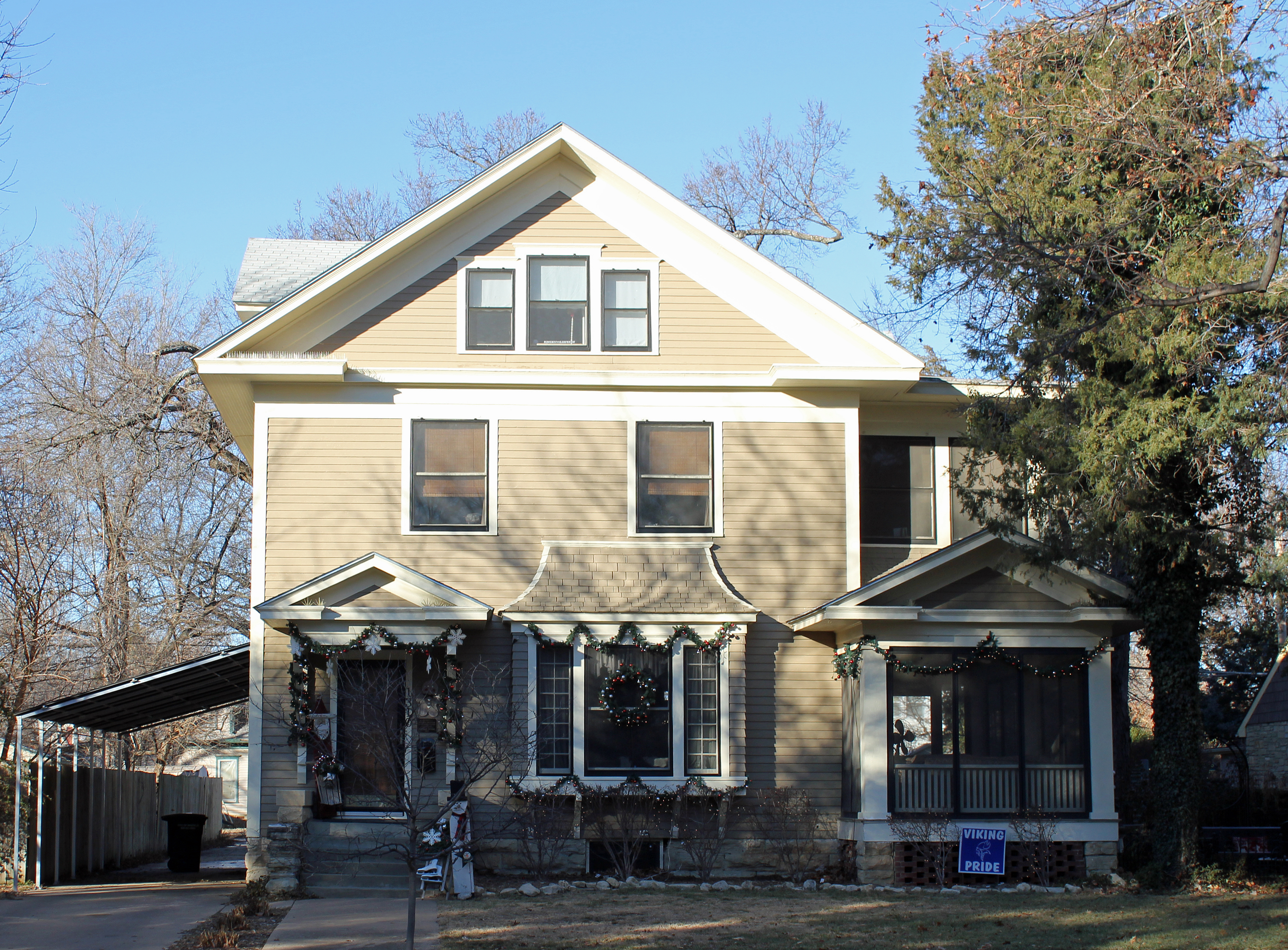

- Location within Kansas Location within the United States
- Location: 1310 E. 9th Ave., Winfield, Kansas
- Coordinates: 37°14′27″N 96°58′52″W
- Area: less than one acre
- Built: 1917
- Architectural style: Bungalow/craftsman
- NRHP reference No.: 07001477
- Added to NRHP: January 31, 2008

The Wilmer House, located at 1310 E. 9th Ave. in Winfield, Kansas, was built in 1917. It was listed on the National Register of Historic Places in 2008.

It is a three-story side-gabled frame house. The property includes a single-car garage built in about 1917.

It was home of physician Dr. F.M. Wilmer (b.1871), who came to Winfield in 1903 and served as an eye, ear, nose and throat doctor for 50 years. He also was active in the community, including by organizing an annual Fourth of July parade.
