= Creswell Township, Kansas =

Creswell Township
- Township
- Location in Cowley County
- Coordinates: 37°06′05″N 097°03′52″W
- Country: United States
- State: Kansas
- County: Cowley

Area
  - Total: 38.30 sq mi (99.19 km^{2})
  - Land: 37.51 sq mi (97.14 km^{2})
  - Water: 0.79 sq mi (2.05 km^{2}) 2.07%
- Elevation: 1,165 ft (355 m)

Population (2020)
  - Total: 1,888
  - Density: 50.34/sq mi (19.44/km^{2})
- GNIS feature ID: 0470065

Creswell Township is a township in Cowley County, Kansas, United States. As of the 2020 census, its population was 1,888.

== Geography ==
Creswell Township covers an area of 38.3 square miles (99 km^{2}) and contains two incorporated settlements, Arkansas City and Parkerfield. According to the USGS, it contains one cemetery, Parker.

The streams of Spring Creek and Walnut River run through this township.

== Transportation ==
Creswell Township contains two airports or landing strips: Charden Farms Airport and Marrs Field.
