= Winfield National Bank Building =

- U.S. National Register of Historic Places
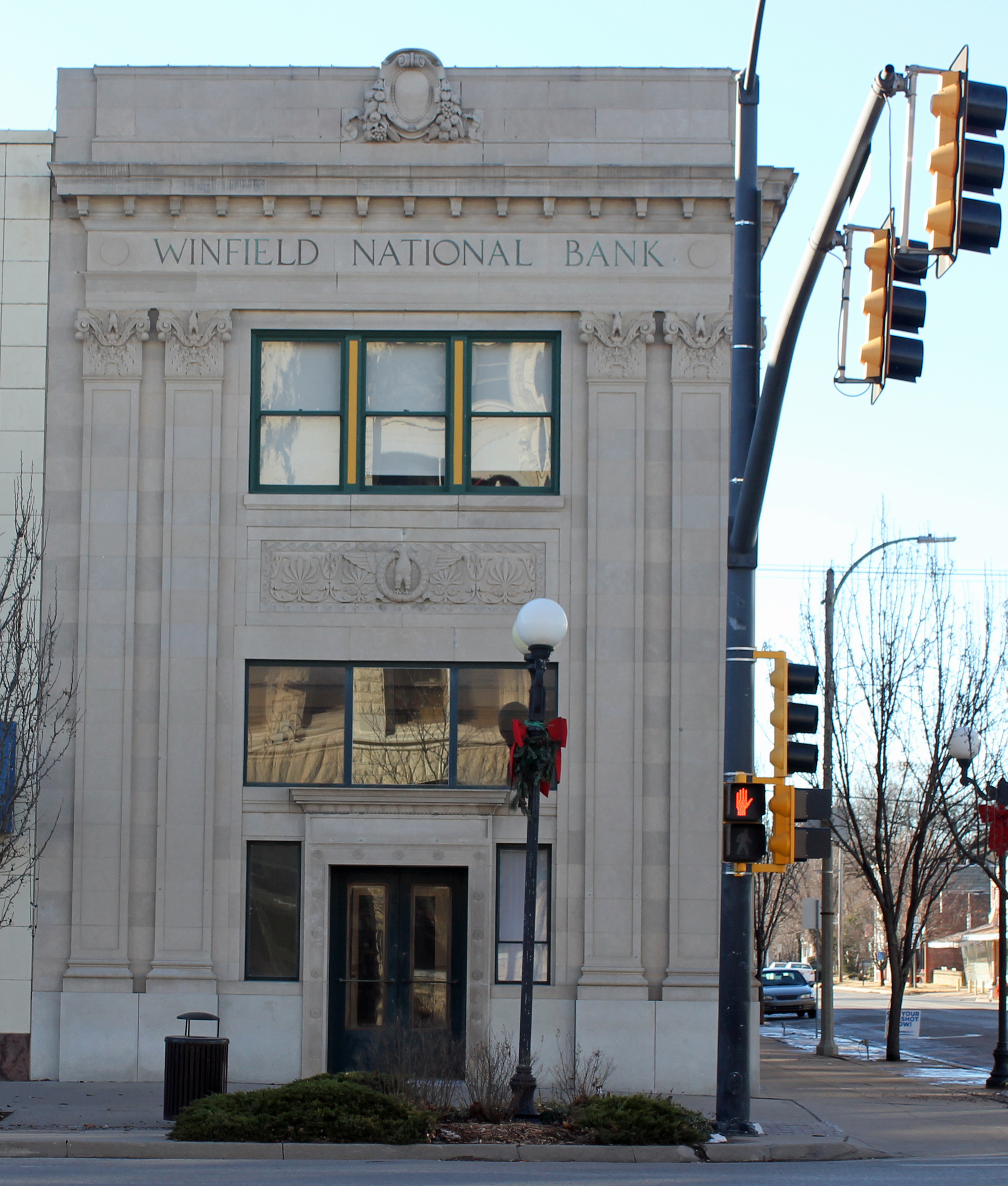
- The Winfield National Bank Building in 2013

- Location within Kansas Location within the United States
- Location: 901 Main St., Winfield, Kansas
- Coordinates: 37°14′25″N 96°59′51″W
- Area: Less than one acre
- Built: 1923
- Architectural style: Classical Revival
- NRHP reference No.: 11001031
- Added to NRHP: January 20, 2012

The Winfield National Bank Building, located at 901 Main Street in Winfield, Kansas, was built in 1923. It was listed on the National Register of Historic Places in 2012.

It is Classical Revival in style, with some Beaux-Arts details.
