= Cowley Community College =

Public college in Arkansas City, Kansas, US

Cowley College
- Type: Public community college
- Established: 1922
- President: Michelle Schoon
- Students: 2,166 (Fall 2023)
- Location: Arkansas City, Kansas, United States; 37°3′39″N 97°02′33″W
- Colors: Black and Orange
- Website: www.cowley.edu

Cowley College is a public community college in Arkansas City, Kansas. It also operates locations in nearby Wellington, Winfield, Mulvane, and Wichita. In addition to an online presence the college offers on-site courses at nine area high schools. Cowley College is accredited by the Higher Learning Commission.

== History ==
Cowley College held its first classes on Sept. 11, 1922. At this point, it was known as the Arkansas City Junior College (ACJC), and, like most junior colleges of the time, operated under the directorship of the local school district. Classes were held on the top floor of the Arkansas City High School, but were soon relocated to the basement, earning it the nickname "Basement University." In 1936, a combination auditorium-gymnasium was constructed, and in 1952, ACJC held its first classes in a dedicated college building.

During the mid-1960s, ACJC began a process of name changes in an attempt to keep current with state legislation designed to spur growth of junior colleges and vocational schools in Kansas. After no less than two revisions, in 1965, it was given the name Cowley County Community College and Vocational-Technical School, which was commonly abbreviated CCCC.

In 1967, the citizens of Cowley County elected a six-member board of trustees for CCCC, and on July 1, it assumed control of college operations. The new board appointed Paul Johnson as the first president of the college. Johnson had been the dean of the college under the school board's direction. The county continues to elect members to the board of trustees in four-year terms. Johnson died the following year and was succeeded on an interim basis by William S. Scott until the end of June. On July 1, 1968, Gwendel A. "Gwen" Nelson was appointed president of the college by the board of trustees. Immediately, Nelson began a far-reaching program of expansion and upgrades. When he arrived at the college, it owned no property (the land on which the buildings stood was rented from the school district), and its program offerings were limited. During his tenure, which lasted until 1987, Nelson would be instrumental in land negotiations with the school board, resulting in the college's ownership of all of its main campus and the adjacent old high school. His leadership resulted in great expansion of academic programs, including upgrading the vocational school, and he would oversee the construction of six new buildings, including the college's first dormitories.

In 2017, Sumner County passed a half-cent sales tax increase to fund a second campus of Cowley College to be built in Wellington. Sumner County Campus of Cowley College was planned to open for classes in the fall of 2018. The Short Family of Oxford, Kansas, donated the property for the campus to be built on the south side of Highway 160.

On February 2, 2023, the Cowley College Board of Trustees voted unanimously to terminate President Randy Smith's contract. Michelle Schoon was appointed to serve as Interim President.

== Campus ==
The college's main campus is in Arkansas City, Kansas. It also operates locations in nearby Winfield, Mulvane, Wellington, and Wichita. In addition to its online presence the college offers on-site courses at nine area high schools. Cowley College's Ireland Hall, was designed by architect Charles Sumner Sedgwick and constructed in 1890 as the Arkansas City High School. It is listed on the National Register of Historic Places as Old Arkansas City High School.

== Alumni ==
- Travis Hafner, professional baseball player
- Tyrus McGee, professional basketball player
- Trevor Rosenthal, professional baseball player
- Louis Weller, professional football player

== See also ==
- National Register of Historic Places listings in Cowley County, Kansas
