= Bryant School (Winfield, Kansas) =

- U.S. National Register of Historic Places
- Bryant School in 2026

- Location within Kansas Location within the United States
- Location: 1011 Mansfield St., Winfield, Kansas
- Coordinates: 37°14′19″N 97°00′04″W
- Area: Less than one acre
- Built: c. 1880, 1916, 1938
- NRHP reference No.: 100001701
- Added to NRHP: October 4, 2017

The Bryant School in Winfield, Kansas, United States was listed on the National Register of Historic Places on October 4, 2017. It was built and expanded in c. 1880, 1916, and 1938. It has also been known as West Ward School, as Second Ward School, as Western Public School, and as the Cowley County Historical Society Museum.

It served as a school until 1964. It became home of the Cowley County Historical Society Museum in the late 1960s and is used as a museum still in 2017.
