= Magnolia Ranch =

- U.S. National Register of Historic Places
- Location within Kansas Location within the United States
- Location: 10 miles southeast of Winfield, Kansas on U.S. Route 77
- Coordinates: 37°08′03″N 96°55′23″W
- Area: 6.5 acres (2.6 ha)
- Built: 1883
- Architectural style: Renaissance
- NRHP reference No.: 73000750
- Added to NRHP: March 7, 1973

Magnolia Ranch, near Winfield, Kansas dates from 1883. A 6.5 acres (2.6 ha) portion of the ranch was listed on the National Register of Historic Places in 1973 with six contributing buildings.

It has also been known as Chesbro Ranch. The ranch house is a two-and-a-half-story 30 by 50 feet (9.1 m × 15.2 m) stone house with early Renaissance styling.
