= KSOK (AM) =

- Arkansas City, Kansas; United States
- Frequency: 1280 kHz
- Branding: KSOK 103.3 FM/1280 AM

Programming
- Format: Classic country

Ownership
- Owner: Christi & Steve Lungren; (Doxa Wave, LLC)

History
- First air date: January 1, 1947
- Call sign meaning: Kansas and Oklahoma

Technical information
- Licensing authority: FCC
- Facility ID: 14238
- Class: D
- Power: 1,000 watts day 100 watts night
- Transmitter coordinates: 37°5′10.4″N 97°1′58.7″W
- Translator: 103.3 K277CK (Arkansas City)

Links
- Public license information: Public file; LMS
- Webcast: Listen live
- Website: ksokradio.com

KSOK (1280 AM) is a radio station licensed to Arkansas City, Kansas, in the United States. The station airs a classic country format, and is currently owned by Christi and Steve Lungren, through licensee Doxa Wave, LLC.
