= Pettit Cleaners Building =

- U.S. National Register of Historic Places
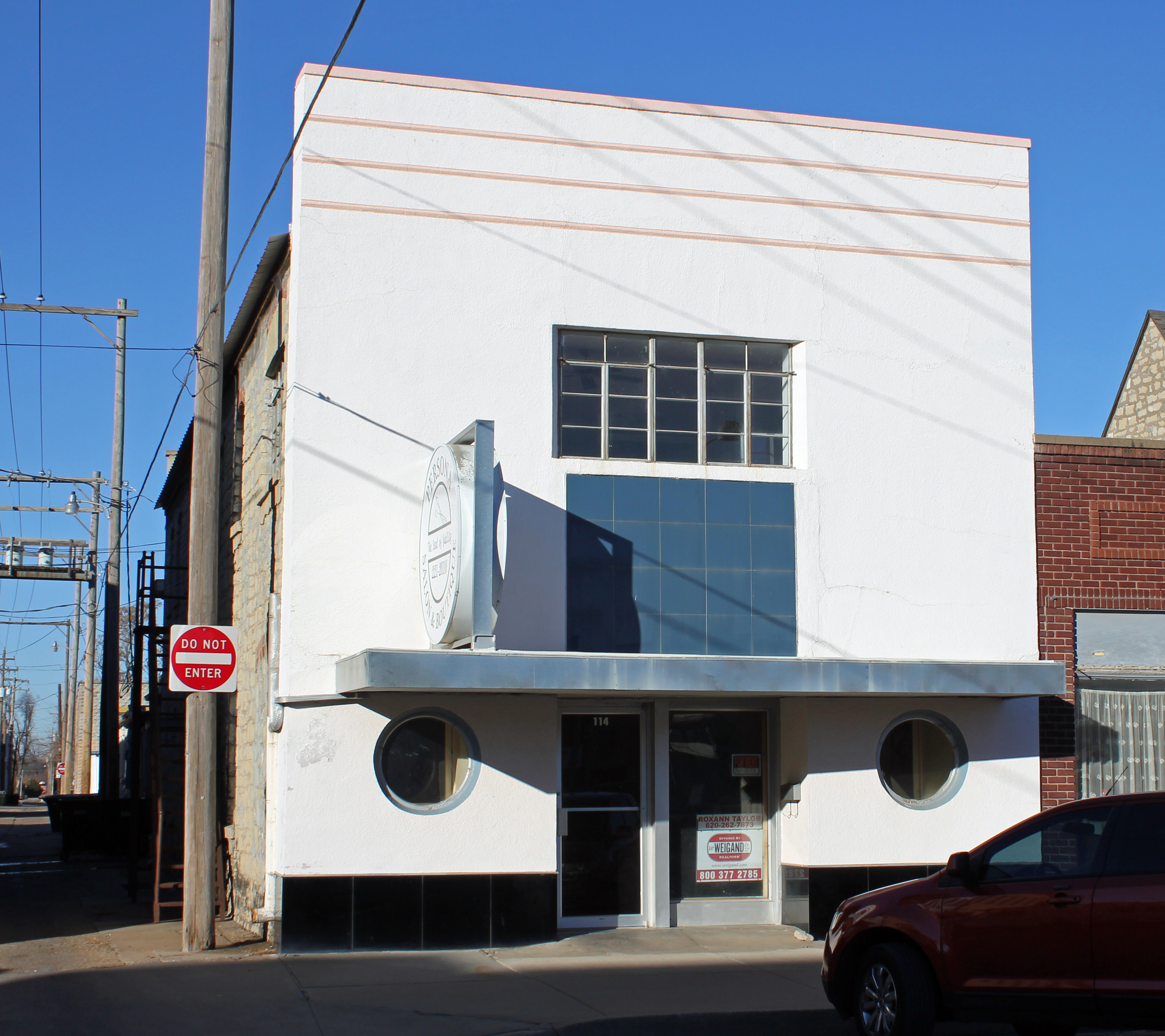
- The Pettit Cleaners Building in 2013

- Location within Kansas Location within the United States
- Location: 114 E. 8th Ave., Winfield, Kansas
- Coordinates: 37°14′29″N 96°59′45″W
- Area: Less than one acre
- Built: 1880, 1947
- Architects: Canton, William N.
- Architectural style: Moderne
- NRHP reference No.: 04001427
- Added to NRHP: January 5, 2005

The Pettit Cleaners Building, located at 114 E. 8th Ave. in Winfield, Kansas, was built in 1947 and listed on the National Register of Historic Places in 2005.

The building measures 25 by 145 feet (7.6 m × 44.2 m) in plan, and is partially one story and partially two stories. The original portion was built in about 1880. In 1947 local architect William N. Canton designed the current Streamline Moderne facade.
