= Rehwinkel Hall =

- West Dormitory-St. John's College
- U.S. National Register of Historic Places
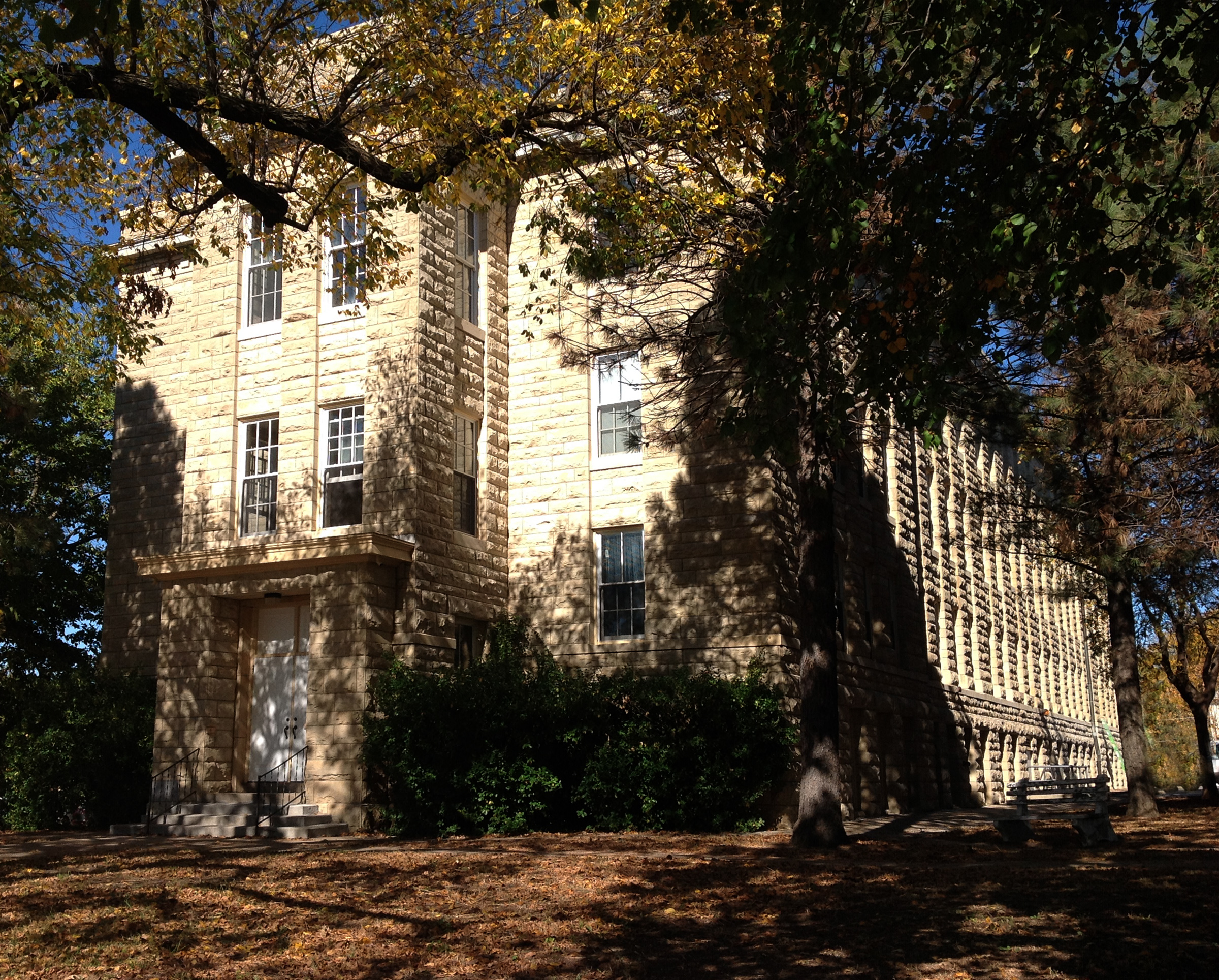

- Location within Kansas Location within the United States
- Location: 1415 E. Sixth Ave., Winfield, Kansas
- Coordinates: 37°13′50″N 96°46′38″W
- Area: less than one acre
- Built: 1915-1916
- Built by: Frankenfeld, Philo
- Architect: Charles F. May
- Architectural style: Classical Revival
- NRHP reference No.: 91001769
- Added to NRHP: December 13, 1991

Rehwinkel Hall, originally known as the West Dormitory, was completed in 1916 as a three-story building with raised basement, facing south on the former St. John's College (Kansas) campus. It was listed on the National Register of Historic Places as West Dormitory-St. John's College in 1991.

== See also ==
- Baden Hall
- Mundinger Hall
