= W. P. Hackney House =

Historic house in Kansas, United States

- U.S. National Register of Historic Places
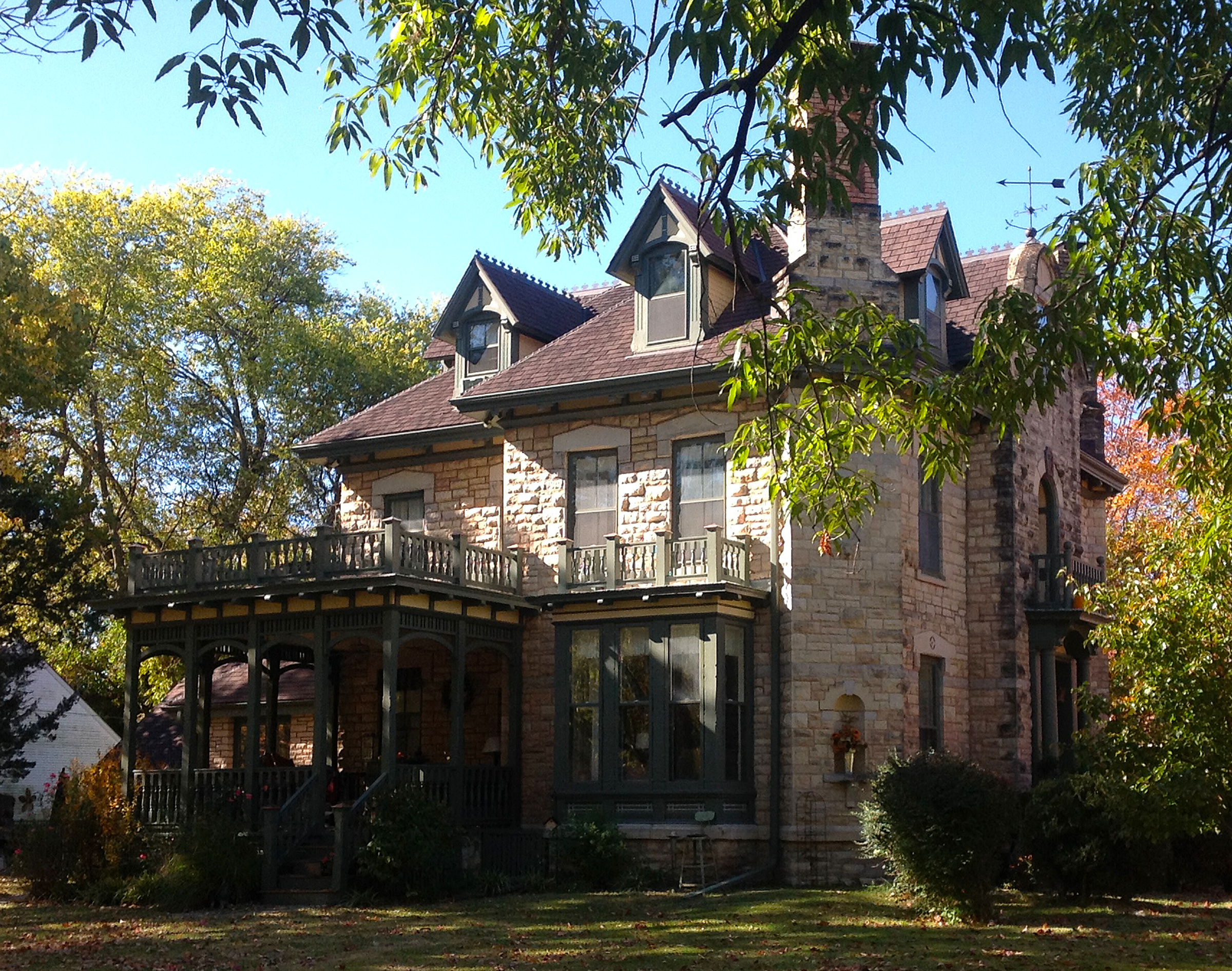

- Location within Kansas Location within the United States
- Location: 417 E. 10th St., Winfield, Kansas
- Coordinates: 37°14′21″N 96°59′31″W
- Area: 1 acre (0.40 ha)
- Built: 1886
- Built by: Caton, William
- NRHP reference No.: 73000749
- Added to NRHP: March 7, 1973

The W. P. Hackney House, located at 417 E. 10th St. in Winfield, Kansas, was built in 1886. Also known as the Jarvis House, it was listed on the National Register of Historic Places in 1973.

Completed in 1886, the three-story limestone house is an example of Vernacular architecture. It was home to W. P. Hackney, a prominent lawyer and politician.

Including a one-story rear wing, the building is about 80 by 40 feet (24 m × 12 m) in plan.
