= St. John's Lutheran College Girls Dormitory =

- U.S. National Register of Historic Places
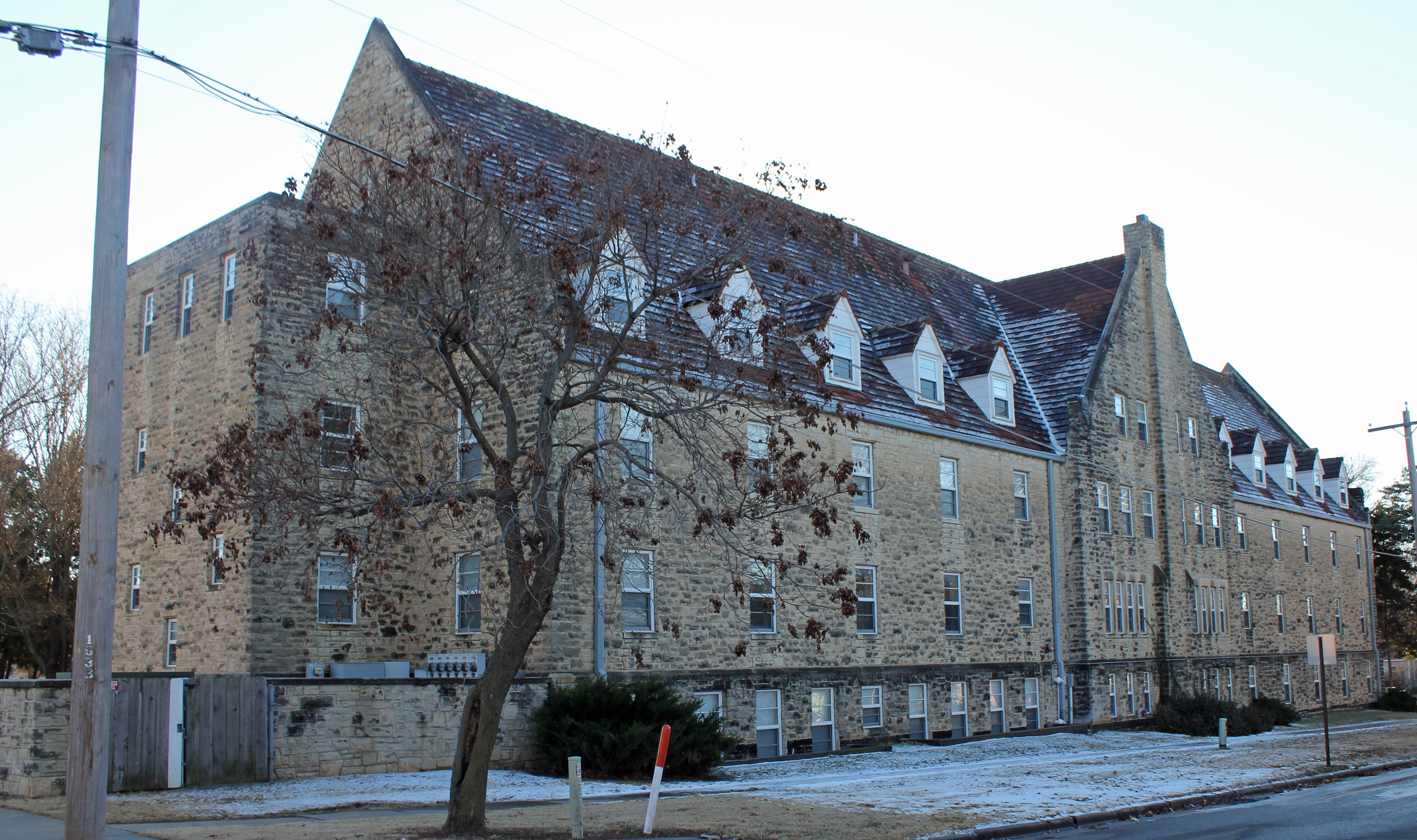
- A view of the back side of the building in late 2013.

- Location within Kansas Location within the United States
- Location: 6th Ave and Gary St., Winfield, Kansas
- Coordinates: 37°14′36″N 96°58′51″W
- Area: less than one acre
- Built: 1950
- Built by: Lippert Brothers Const. Co,
- Architect: Overend & Boucher
- Architectural style: Late Gothic Revival
- NRHP reference No.: 01001544
- Added to NRHP: January 28, 2002

The St. John's Lutheran College Girls Dormitory, also known as Mundinger Hall, is a historic building on the campus of the former St. John's College at 6th Ave and Gary Street in Winfield, Kansas. The main section of the Late Gothic Revival building was constructed in 1949–50. The building was added to the National Register of Historic Places in 2002.

It was designed by architects Overend & Boucher. The main section is 186 by 46 feet (57 m × 14 m) in plan.

== See also ==
- Baden Hall
- Rehwinkel Hall
