= St. John's Lutheran College-Baden Hall =

- U.S. National Register of Historic Places
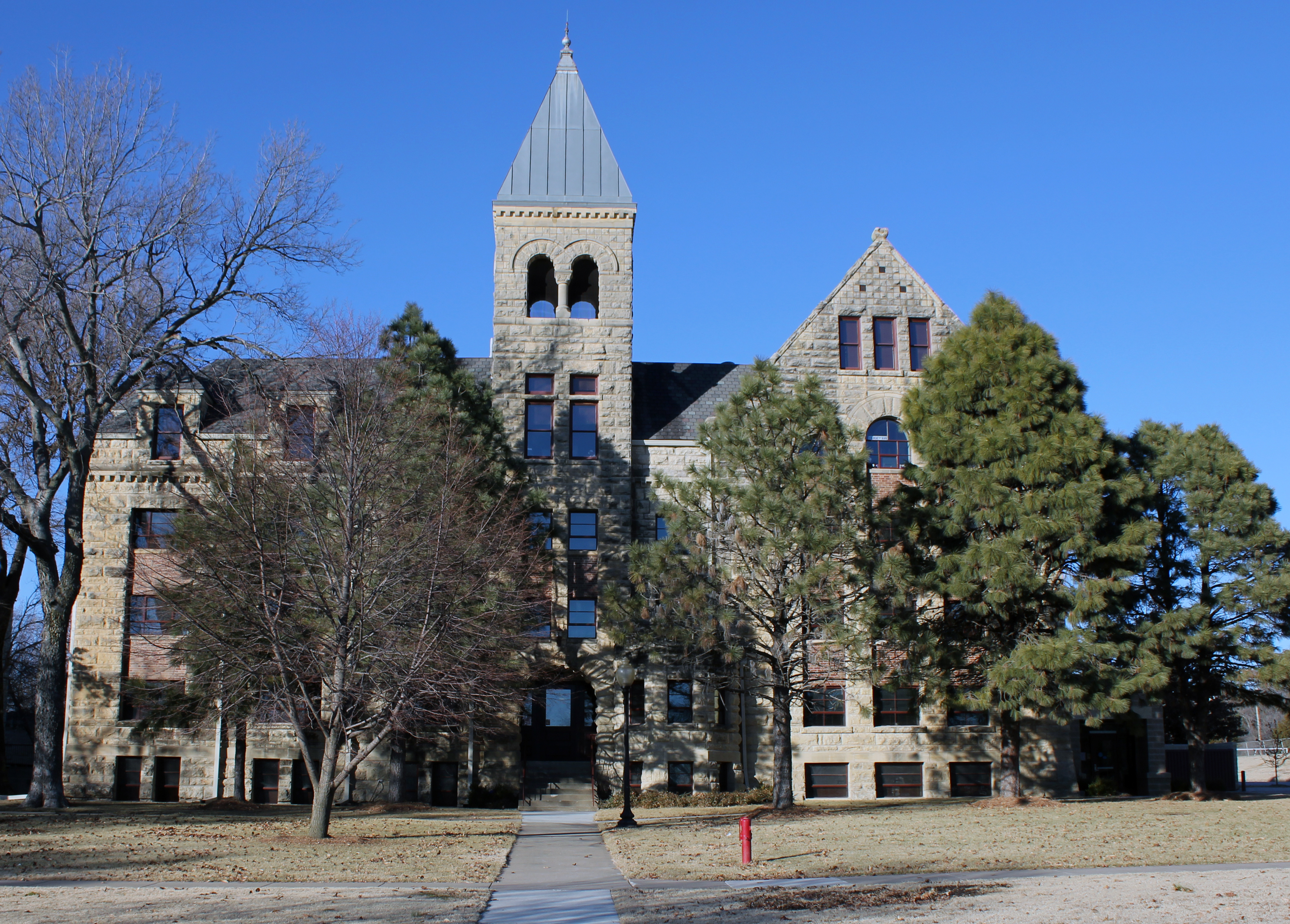

- Location within Kansas Location within the United States
- Location: Seventh Ave. and College St., Winfield, Kansas
- Coordinates: 37°14′34″N 96°58′42″W
- Area: less than one acre
- Built: 1893-94
- Built by: Emanuel Klauser
- Architect: Charles F. May
- Architectural style: Late Gothic Revival
- NRHP reference No.: 10001138
- Added to NRHP: January 18, 2011

The St. John's Lutheran College-Baden Hall is a historic three-story building on the east side of the campus of the former St. John's College, at Seventh Ave. and College St. in Winfield, Kansas. It is the original building of the college and was built during 1893–94. The building was added to the National Register of Historic Places in 2011.

It was designed by architect Charles F. May.

== See also ==
- Mundinger Hall
- Rehwinkel Hall
