= Old Arkansas City High School =

- U.S. National Register of Historic Places
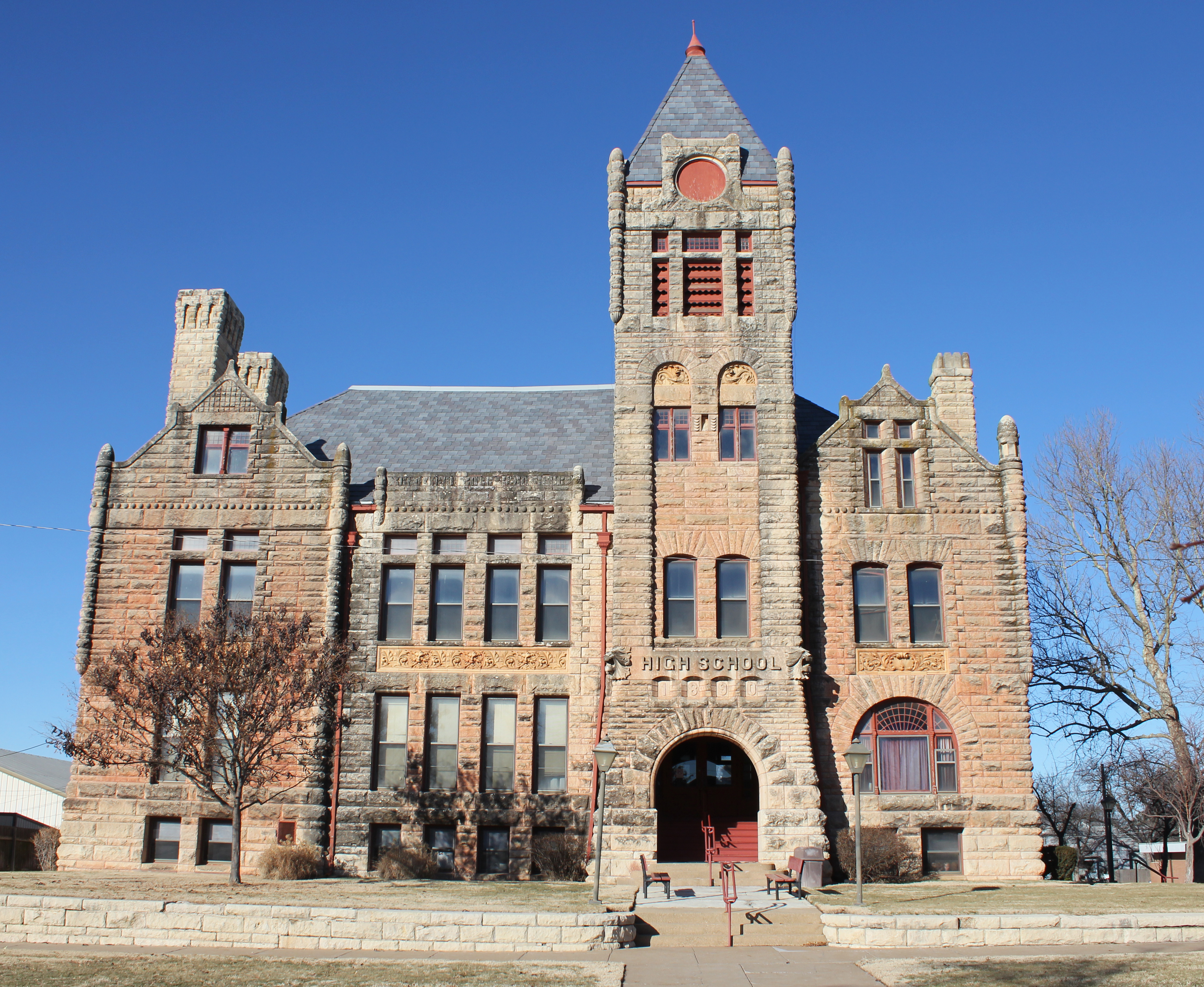
- The Old Arkansas City High School in 2013

- Location within Kansas Location within the United States
- Location: 300 W. Central St., Arkansas City, Kansas
- Coordinates: 37°03′45″N 97°02′29″W
- Area: Less than one acre
- Built: 1890–91
- Built by: Robert Baird
- Architect: Charles Sumner Sedgwick
- Architectural style: Romanesque
- NRHP reference No.: 74000824
- Added to NRHP: November 21, 1974

The Old Arkansas City High School, now known as Ireland Hall and part of the Cowley Community College campus, is located at 300 W. Central Street in Arkansas City, Kansas. It was built in 1890–91. It was listed on the National Register of Historic Places in 1974.

== History ==
The building was designed by architect Charles Sumner Sedgwick. It was previously called the Arkansas City High School. and was home to Arkansas City High School (Kansas).

The marble and stonemasons of the building were Charles Fredrick Rothfus and Antonio and Joseph Buzzi. Construction began on July 10, 1890, and it was occupied beginning September 7, 1892, with all work done by 1893. In 1922 the high school moved to a new building, and so it served as a sixth-grade center until elementary schools absorbed the sixth grade in 1941.

Area citizens protested against district plans to raze the building. Cowley Community College took possession of the building in 1971. The building was renovated by the college in 1982 and renamed Ireland Hall. In 2018 it was occupied by the Criminal Justice Program, the Office of NJCAA Commissioner, and Cosmetology classrooms.

== Architecture and features ==
The main entrance has lion figures created by M. E. Roderick. There was a fountain, garnished with plants, in the center of the ground floor foyer. Fireplaces were installed in the board room and superintendent's office. When the school first opened, Brussels carpet was used to furnish them.

It is a three-story-with-full-basement Romanesque Revival-style building which is 90 by 55 feet (27 m × 17 m) in plan. Its NRHP nomination explains its coloration:

It was constructed of white Silverdale limestone set in red mortar. At the time of construction the only red color available for mortar was vermillion, which was not waterproof. As a result of rain and weather, pink streaks soon appeared on the white stone, and the stone absorbed the color. With the passage of time and continual weathering, the entire structure has acquired a rosy hue. The color has led many viewers to the mistaken conclusion that the building was made of pink Colorado sandstone.

The building was deemed notable as

an outstanding example of the stonecutter's art. The fine detail and workmanship evident on the exterior make it one of the city's architectural landmarks. The building is also significant to the educational development of Arkansas City, having served the community since 1890.
