= Burden, Kansas =

City in Cowley County, Kansas

- City
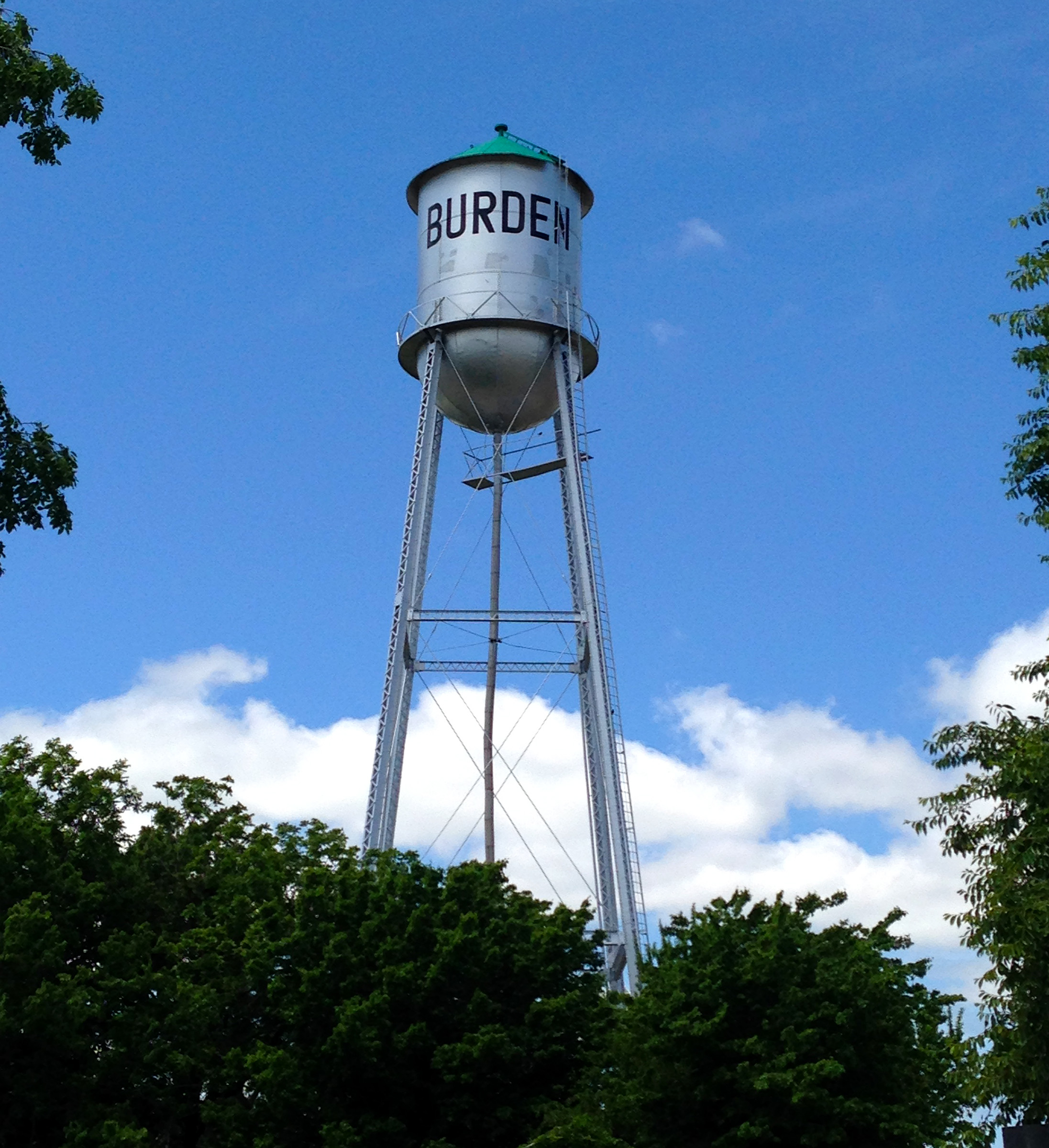
- Burden water tower (2015)

- Location within Cowley County and Kansas

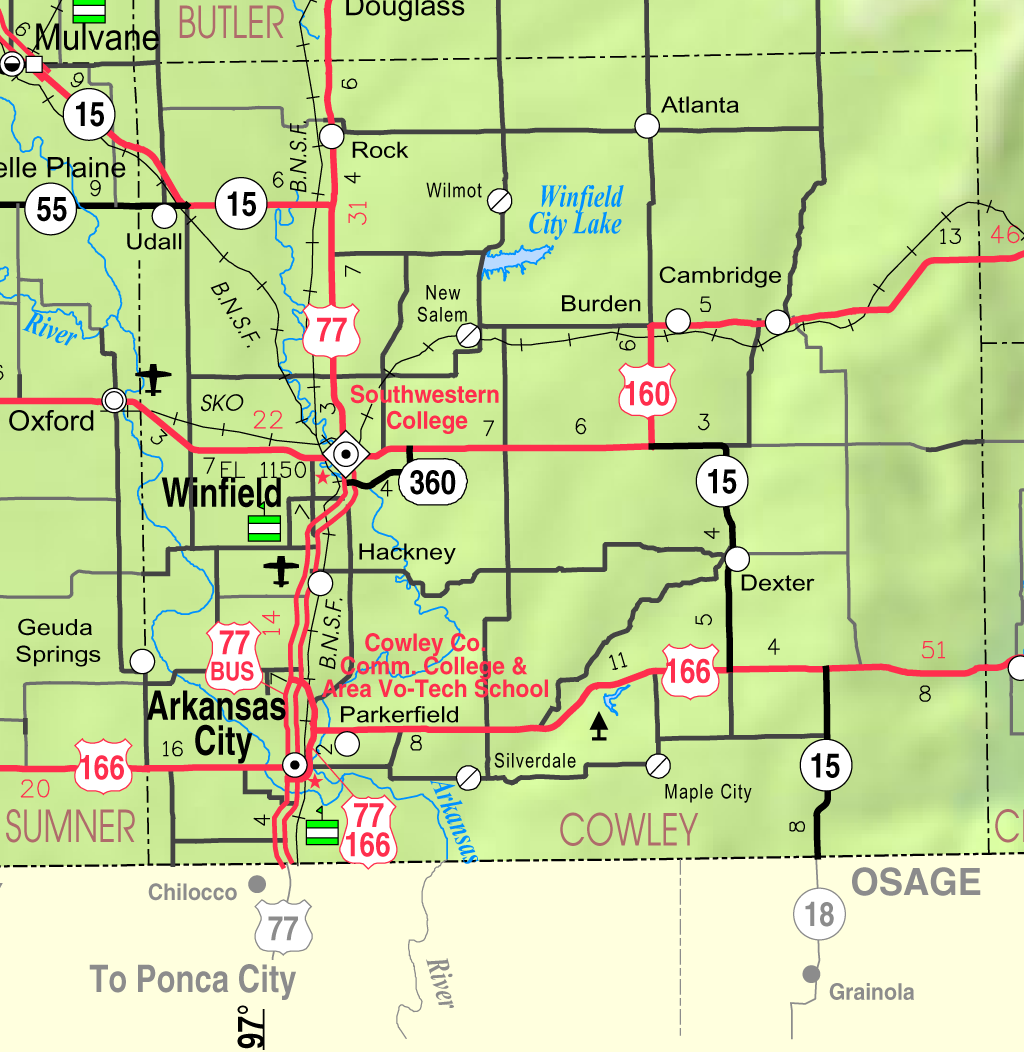
- KDOT map of Cowley County (legend)
- Coordinates: 37°18′54″N 96°45′19″W
- Country: United States
- State: Kansas
- County: Cowley
- Platted: 1879
- Incorporated: 1883
- Named for: Robert Burden

Area
  - Total: 0.52 sq mi (1.34 km^{2})
  - Land: 0.52 sq mi (1.34 km^{2})
  - Water: 0 sq mi (0.00 km^{2})
- Elevation: 1,375 ft (419 m)

Population (2020)
  - Total: 512
  - Density: 990/sq mi (382/km^{2})
- Time zone: UTC-6 (CST)
  - Summer (DST): UTC-5 (CDT)
- ZIP Code: 67019
- Area code: 620
- FIPS code: 20-09250
- GNIS ID: 2393466
- Website: burdenks.gov

Burden is a city in Cowley County, Kansas, United States. As of the 2020 census, the population of the city was 512.

== History ==
In 1879, in anticipation of the coming of the Kansas City, Lawrence and Southern Railroad, a town was surveyed and laid out by a local company. Among its staff was Robert F. Burden, for whom the town is named. The railroad, whose name changed to the Atchison, Topeka and Santa Fe, arrived on February 1, 1882, making Burden one of its stations and shipping points.

The early buildings included a general store, drug store, and post office. The post office, called Burdenville until 1884, was established in 1879. The first newspaper, printed in 1880, was The Enterprise, with a circulation in 1882 of 900. A school that had been one mile north of Burden was relocated to the town in the summer of 1881.

== Geography ==
According to the United States Census Bureau, the city has a total area of 0.54 square miles (1.40 km^{2}), of which 0.53 square miles (1.37 km^{2}) is land and 0.01 square miles (0.03 km^{2}) is water.

== Demographics ==
Historical population
Census	Pop.	Note	%±
1880	157		—
1890	508		223.6%
1900	519		2.2%
1910	424		−18.3%
1920	441		4.0%
1930	507		15.0%
1940	522		3.0%
1950	541		3.6%
1960	580		7.2%
1970	503		−13.3%
1980	518		3.0%
1990	518		0.0%
2000	564		8.9%
2010	535		−5.1%
2020	512		−4.3%
U.S. Decennial Census

=== 2020 census ===
The 2020 United States census counted 512 people, 189 households, and 135 families in Burden. The population density was 990.3 per square mile (382.4/km^{2}). There were 223 housing units at an average density of 431.3 per square mile (166.5/km^{2}). The racial makeup was 88.09% (451) white or European American (86.33% non-Hispanic white), 0.0% (0) black or African-American, 2.54% (13) Native American or Alaska Native, 0.0% (0) Asian, 0.0% (0) Pacific Islander or Native Hawaiian, 0.0% (0) from other races, and 9.38% (48) from two or more races. Hispanic or Latino of any race was 2.15% (11) of the population.

Of the 189 households, 33.3% had children under the age of 18; 50.3% were married couples living together; 24.9% had a female householder with no spouse or partner present. 25.4% of households consisted of individuals and 11.6% had someone living alone who was 65 years of age or older. The average household size was 2.9 and the average family size was 3.6. The percent of those with a bachelor's degree or higher was estimated to be 11.5% of the population.

33.6% of the population was under the age of 18, 5.7% from 18 to 24, 23.4% from 25 to 44, 23.6% from 45 to 64, and 13.7% who were 65 years of age or older. The median age was 34.5 years. For every 100 females, there were 102.4 males. For every 100 females ages 18 and older, there were 103.6 males.

The 2016–2020 5-year American Community Survey estimates show that the median household income was $54,375 (with a margin of error of +/- $20,395) and the median family income was $64,904 (+/- $12,991). Males had a median income of $42,639 (+/- $6,485) versus $21,964 (+/- $11,680) for females. The median income for those above 16 years old was $35,625 (+/- $13,340). Approximately, 10.2% of families and 12.3% of the population were below the poverty line, including 19.2% of those under the age of 18 and 7.0% of those ages 65 or over.

=== 2010 census ===
As of the census of 2010, there were 535 people, 195 households, and 145 families living in the city. The population density was 1,009.4 inhabitants per square mile (389.7/km^{2}). There were 234 housing units at an average density of 441.5 per square mile (170.5/km^{2}). The racial makeup of the city was 97.2% White, 1.7% Native American, and 1.1% from two or more races. Hispanic or Latino of any race were 3.7% of the population.

There were 195 households, of which 40.0% had children under the age of 18 living with them, 53.3% were married couples living together, 12.8% had a female householder with no husband present, 8.2% had a male householder with no wife present, and 25.6% were non-families. 23.1% of all households were made up of individuals, and 12.8% had someone living alone who was 65 years of age or older. The average household size was 2.74 and the average family size was 3.22.

The median age in the city was 33.2 years. 31.4% of residents were under the age of 18; 7.8% were between the ages of 18 and 24; 24% were from 25 to 44; 21% were from 45 to 64; and 15.5% were 65 years of age or older. The gender makeup of the city was 50.3% male and 49.7% female.

=== 2000 census ===
As of the census of 2000, there were 564 people, 210 households, and 158 families living in the city. The population density was 1,072.0 inhabitants per square mile (413.9/km^{2}). There were 236 housing units at an average density of 448.6 per square mile (173.2/km^{2}). The racial makeup of the city was 93.26% White, 0.18% African American, 2.48% Native American, 1.42% from other races, and 2.66% from two or more races. Hispanic or Latino of any race were 1.95% of the population.

There were 210 households, out of which 37.6% had children under the age of 18 living with them, 56.2% were married couples living together, 11.9% had a female householder with no husband present, and 24.3% were non-families. 21.4% of all households were made up of individuals, and 11.4% had someone living alone who was 65 years of age or older. The average household size was 2.69 and the average family size was 3.12.

In the city, the population was spread out, with 32.6% under the age of 18, 9.2% from 18 to 24, 26.6% from 25 to 44, 16.1% from 45 to 64, and 15.4% who were 65 years of age or older. The median age was 32 years. For every 100 females, there were 97.9 males. For every 100 females age 18 and over, there were 95.9 males.

The median income for a household in the city was $26,641, and the median income for a family was $33,833. Males had a median income of $29,821 versus $17,656 for females. The per capita income for the city was $13,549. About 8.1% of families and 12.2% of the population were below the poverty line, including 14.5% of those under age 18 and 14.4% of those age 65 or over.

== Education ==
The community is served by Central USD 462 public school district. The Central High School mascot is Central Raiders.

Prior to school unification, the Burden Raiders won the Kansas State High School class B Baseball championship in 1955. Central High School won the 3A State Championship in Football in 1987 and 2A State Championship in the Scholars Bowl in 2011.
