= Arkansas City, Kansas =

City in Cowley County, Kansas, USA

- City
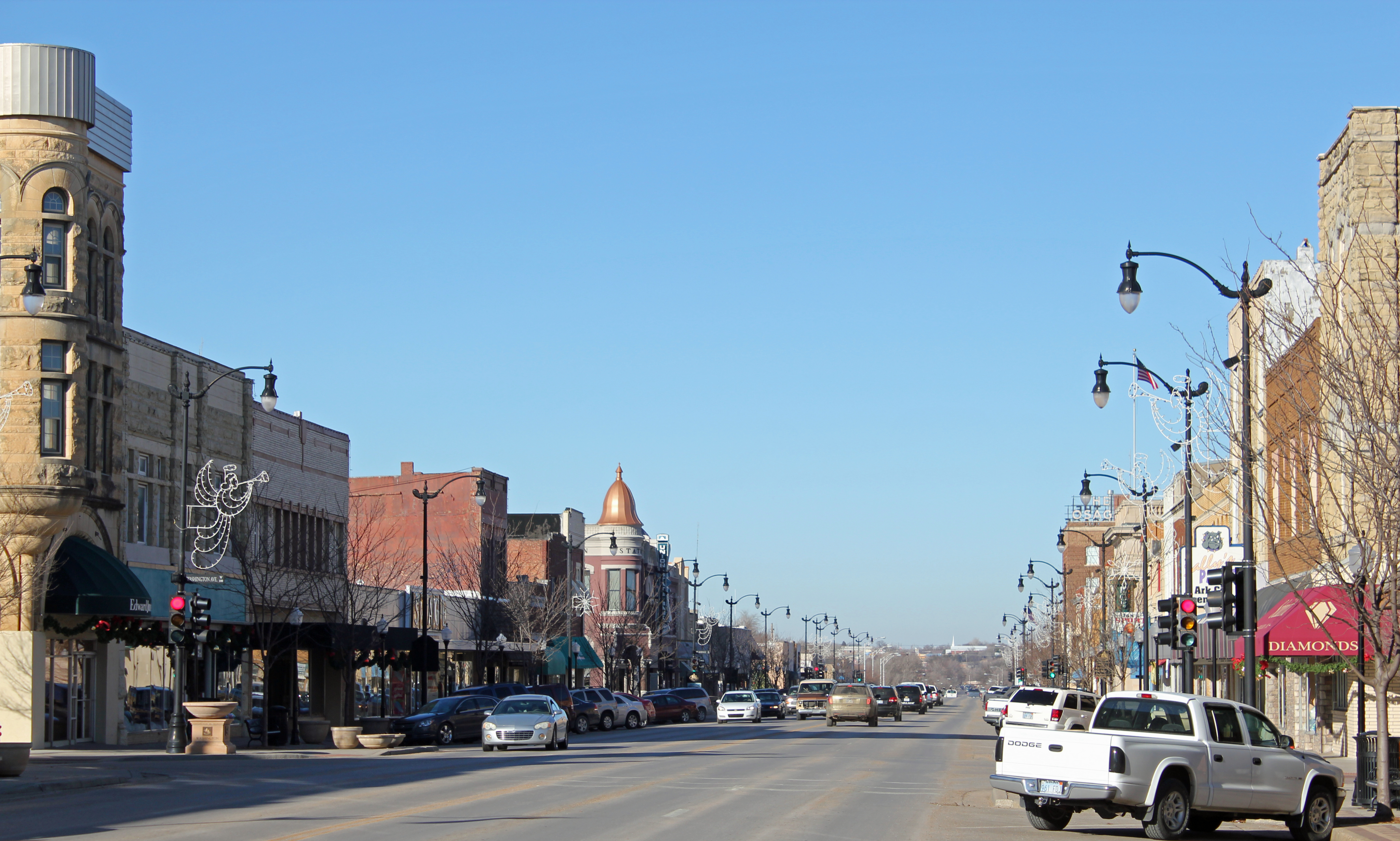
- Summit Avenue looking north (2013)

- Wordmark
- Nickname: Ark City
- Location within Cowley County and Kansas

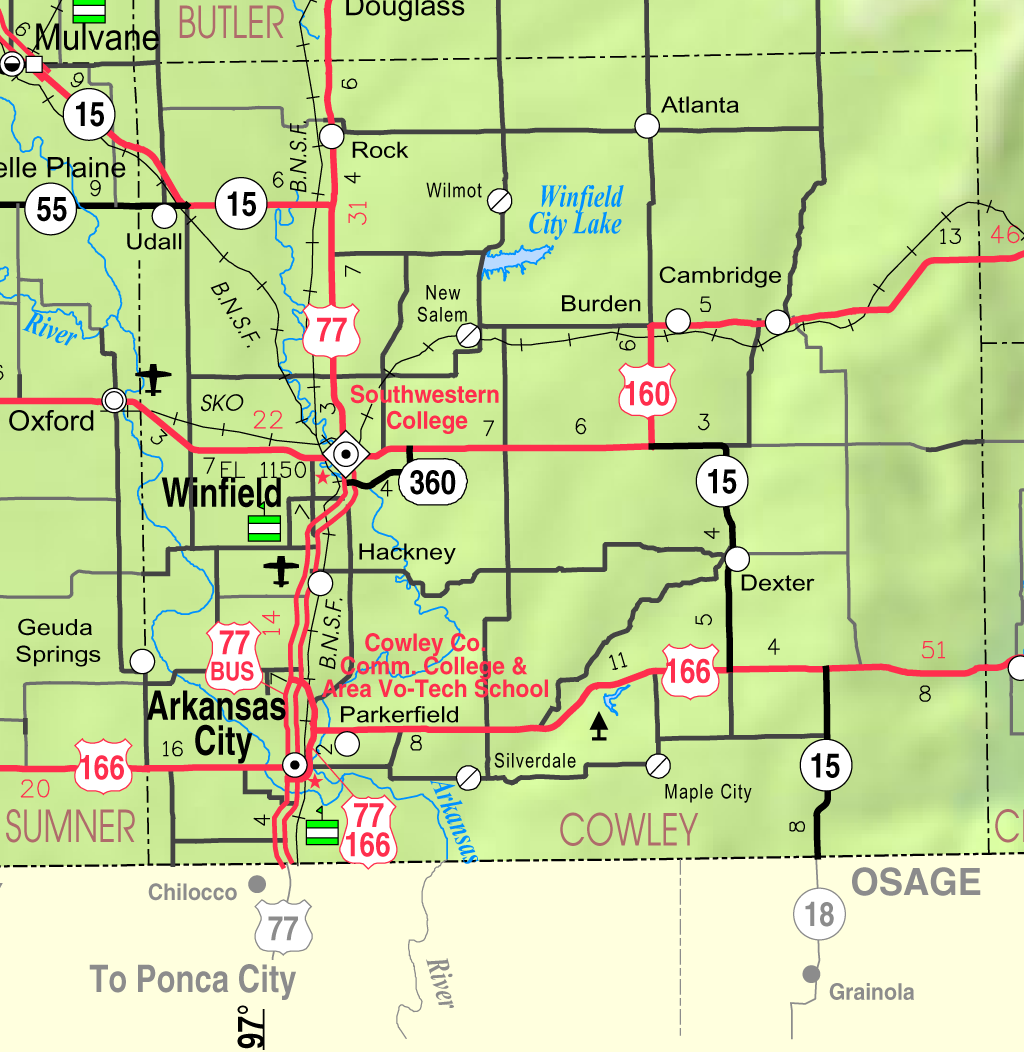
- KDOT map of Cowley County (legend)
- Coordinates: 37°04′22″N 97°02′19″W
- Country: United States
- State: Kansas
- County: Cowley
- Founded: 1870
- Incorporated: 1884

Government
  - City Manager: Randy Frazer

Area
  - Total: 9.34 sq mi (24.18 km^{2})
  - Land: 9.32 sq mi (24.13 km^{2})
  - Water: 0.019 sq mi (0.05 km^{2}) 0.21%
- Elevation: 1,086 ft (331 m)

Population (2020)
  - Total: 11,974
  - Density: 1,285/sq mi (496.2/km^{2})
- Time zone: UTC-6 (CST)
  - Summer (DST): UTC-5 (CDT)
- ZIP Code: 67005
- Area code: 620
- FIPS code: 20-02300
- GNIS ID: 485541
- Website: arkcity.org

Arkansas City (/ɑːrˈkænzəs/) is a city in Cowley County, Kansas, United States, situated at the confluence of the Arkansas and Walnut rivers in the southwestern part of the county. As of the 2020 census, the population of the city was 11,974.

== Pronunciation ==
The name of this city is not pronounced like the nearby state of Arkansas, but rather as /ɑːrˈkænzəs/ (the final "s" is pronounced, and it rhymes with Kansas). Over the years there has been much confusion about the regional pronunciation of "Arkansas", which locals render as /ɑːrˈkænzəs/ rather than /ˈɑːrkənsɔː/. Throughout much of Kansas, residents also use this alternative pronunciation when referring to the Arkansas River.

The city is also known as "Ark City".

== History ==
=== Early history ===
Present-day Arkansas City sits on the site of an ancestral Wichita city, Etzanoa, which flourished from 1450 to 1700 and had an estimated population of 20,000.

In 1601, New Mexico Governor Juan de Oñate led an expedition across the Great Plains and found a large settlement of Indians he called Rayados. They lived along the Walnut River in the eastern part of Arkansas City. Extensive remains of Indian settlements have been found along six miles (9.7 km) of the Walnut River. The Rayados were the ancestors of the Indians later called Wichita. Wichita settlements from the 18th century are also found a few miles south of Arkansas City on the west bank of the Arkansas River.

=== 19th century ===
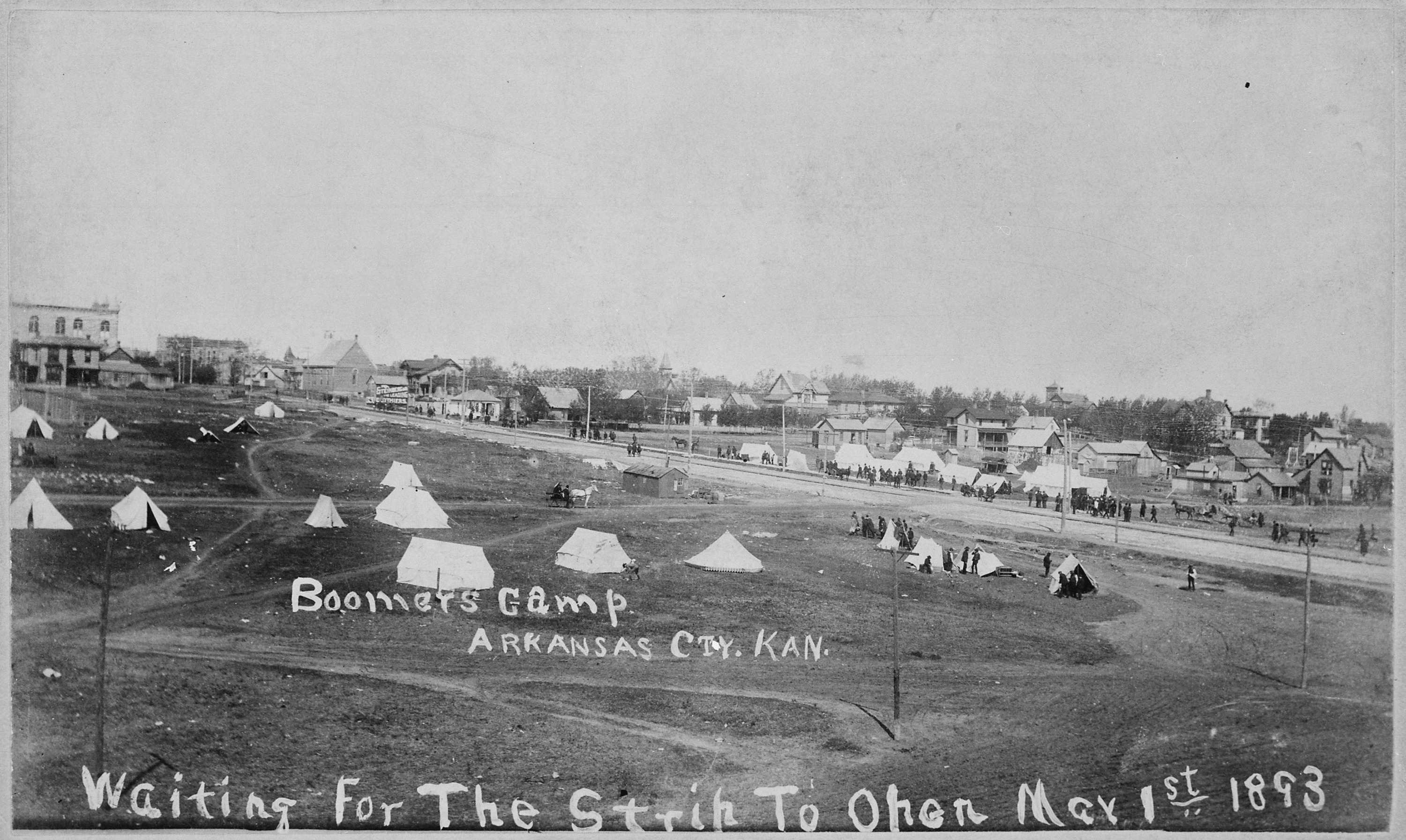
Boomer camp at Arkansas City waiting for Land Run of 1893 in Oklahoma

European-American settlers first congregated in the area where Arkansas City now stands in the 1860s.

Settlers established a town in 1870. They had difficulty choosing a name; early names included Adelphia, Creswell, and Walnut City before the present name was chosen. The first post office in Arkansas City was established on May 16, 1870.

In 1877, the Florence, El Dorado, and Walnut Valley Railroad Company built a branch line from Florence to El Dorado, in 1881 it was extended to Douglass, and later to Arkansas City. The line was leased and operated by the Atchison, Topeka and Santa Fe Railway. The line from Florence to El Dorado was abandoned in 1942. The original branch line connected Florence, Burns, De Graff, El Dorado, Augusta, Douglass, Rock, Akron, Winfield, and Arkansas City.

Arkansas City grew steadily through the latter part of the 19th century, and enjoyed a population explosion starting in 1891, when thousands of people moved into the area in anticipation of the Cherokee Strip Land Run.

=== 20th century ===
At the turn of the century, Arkansas City was a rival to Wichita in size and enterprise, boasting several busy rail lines, an elegant opera house, numerous fine hotels, a manufacturing base and a bustling agricultural economy. A popular swimming hole called Paris Lake was located west of downtown; the lake—and the hot springs at Geuda as well—was mired with silt in a flood about 1919. Nearly 20 years later the WPA would build the Paris Park pool in the same spot. African Americans were not allowed to swim in the Paris Park pool during the era of segregation and used a separate facility colloquially referred to as "the black pool" by local residents.

The Kirkwood Wind Engine Company, a former windmill manufacturer, was headquartered in Arkansas City near the turn of the 20th century; the now-defunct Kanotex Refining Company established a refinery and headquarters in the city in 1917.

During the 1920s, Arkansas City had an active group of Ku Klux Klan. The group was mostly concentrated in south-central and south-east Kansas. The state took action to shut down the group, and most Klans disbanded by 1927.

In 1928, the city's official fall festival, Arkalalah, was inaugurated. This annual event still draws thousands of visitors each October, and features a queen, a carnival, dozens of homegrown fair food vendors and a spectacular parade typically lasting two hours or more. During the 1955 Arkalalah celebration, retired Santa Fe steam locomotive 2542 was dedicated in Wilson Park, where it remains today.

The city prospered through much of the 20th century, but by the 1980s, the community was facing economic challenges. The railroads shifted many of their crews to other stops, the old Rodeo meat packing plant, which for a short time was Morrell Meats, closed. The only passenger train that served the city, Amtrak's Lone Star, was discontinued. In 1996 Total Petroleum closed their refinery in Ark City with a loss of 170 jobs. By 2003 other large employers in Cowley County closed operations. The Binney & Smith (Crayola) plant closed with a loss of 400 jobs. Winfield State Hospital and Gordon Piatt Industries were closed in nearby Winfield with a combined loss of 973 jobs. Montgomery KONE Elevator and Central Plains Book Manufacturing at nearby Strother Field were also shuttered.

=== 21st century ===
Arkansas City is now home to state-of-the-art meat processor Creekstone Farms Premium Beef LLC which employs over 1100 workers. Several smaller manufacturing companies are expanding their operations while new start ups are finding a home in Cowley County due in part to the workforce supplied by the two local colleges in the county. Both cities, only 11 miles (18 km) apart, now have large Wal-Mart stores (a new Wal-Mart Supercenter opened in Arkansas City in March 2006, and another has been constructed in Winfield, Kansas); conversely, both towns' (in Arkansas City—the Burford, the Howard, and the Crest) movie theaters recently closed and were replaced by a single facility halfway between the cities, just south of the Strother Field industrial park. B & B Theatres donated the two downtown buildings to non-profit organizations in each of the respective communities. The Ark City Burford Theatre and Commercial Building is undergoing a transformation/renovation that will become a new community arts center and gathering space. Construction began in spring 2006 on the planned downtown revitalization streetscape.

In 2006, the local physicians in Arkansas City banded together with the South Central Kansas Regional Medical Center (SCKRMC) board and the City of Arkansas City to build a new hospital, which opened in March 2011.

In 2010, the Keystone-Cushing Pipeline (Phase II) was constructed west of Arkansas City, north to south through Cowley County, with much controversy over tax exemption and environmental concerns (if a leak ever occurs).

In recent years, there have been proposals to extend Amtrak passenger rail service for the Heartland Flyer from Oklahoma City to Newton with new stops in Kansas at Arkansas City and Wichita.

In 2023, Oklahoma and Kansas state officials began seeking federal approval and funding to extend the Amtrak passenger rail train Heartland Flyer from Oklahoma City to Newton, with new stops in Kansas at Arkansas City and Wichita. In November 2023, KDOT said the service would start in 2029 if approved, but could begin sooner were the project to be fast tracked.

== Geography ==
Arkansas City is situated along the northern bank of the Arkansas River and to the west of its confluence with the Walnut River. It is located at the junction of US-77 and US-166, only four miles (6.4 km) north of the Kansas-Oklahoma border. Winfield, the county seat, is 13 miles (21 km) north of Arkansas City along US-77, and Strother Field, a general aviation airport, is approximately eight miles (13 km) north. Arkansas City is located 54 miles (87 km) southeast of Wichita.

According to the United States Census Bureau, the city has a total area of 9.38 square miles (24.29 km^{2}), of which 9.36 square miles (24.24 km^{2}) is land and 0.02 square miles (0.05 km^{2}) is water.

=== Climate ===
The climate in this area is characterized by hot, humid summers and generally mild to cool winters. According to the Köppen Climate Classification system, Arkansas City has a humid subtropical climate, abbreviated "Cfa" on climate maps.

== Demographics ==
Historical population
| Census | Pop. | Note | %± |
|---|---|---|---|
| 1880 | 1,012 | | — |
| 1890 | 8,347 | | 724.8% |
| 1900 | 6,140 | | −26.4% |
| 1910 | 7,508 | | 22.3% |
| 1920 | 11,253 | | 49.9% |
| 1930 | 13,946 | | 23.9% |
| 1940 | 12,752 | | −8.6% |
| 1950 | 12,903 | | 1.2% |
| 1960 | 14,262 | | 10.5% |
| 1970 | 13,216 | | −7.3% |
| 1980 | 13,201 | | −0.1% |
| 1990 | 12,762 | | −3.3% |
| 2000 | 11,963 | | −6.3% |
| 2010 | 12,415 | | 3.8% |
| 2020 | 11,974 | | −3.6% |
| 2023 (est.) | 11,765 | | −1.7% |
U.S. Decennial Census; 2010-2020

=== 2020 census ===
As of the 2020 census, Arkansas City had a population of 11,974 people, with 4,467 households and 2,762 families. The population density was 1,285.2 per square mile (496.2/km^{2}). There were 5,382 housing units at an average density of 577.7 per square mile (223.0/km^{2}).

The median age was 33.8 years. 26.8% of residents were under the age of 18, 12.1% were from 18 to 24, 23.6% were from 25 to 44, 21.0% were from 45 to 64, and 16.5% were 65 years of age or older. For every 100 females, there were 94.1 males, and for every 100 females age 18 and over, there were 92.0 males age 18 and over. 96.0% of residents lived in urban areas, while 4.0% lived in rural areas.

Of the 4,467 households, 32.5% had children under the age of 18 living in them. Of all households, 40.2% were married-couple households, 21.0% were households with a male householder and no spouse or partner present, and 30.4% were households with a female householder and no spouse or partner present. About 32.3% of all households were made up of individuals, and 15.5% had someone living alone who was 65 years of age or older.

Racial composition as of the 2020 census
| Race | Number | Percent |
|---|---|---|
| White | 8,345 | 69.7% |
| Black or African American | 375 | 3.1% |
| American Indian and Alaska Native | 380 | 3.2% |
| Asian | 52 | 0.4% |
| Native Hawaiian and Other Pacific Islander | 94 | 0.8% |
| Some other race | 1,010 | 8.4% |
| Two or more races | 1,718 | 14.3% |
| Hispanic or Latino (of any race) | 2,613 | 21.8% |

The non-Hispanic white share of the population was 64.56%.

=== 2016–2020 American Community Survey estimates ===
The average household size was 2.2 and the average family size was 3.0. The percent of those with a bachelor's degree or higher was estimated to be 12.7% of the population.

The 2016–2020 5-year American Community Survey estimates show that the median household income was $46,331 (with a margin of error of +/- $4,847) and the median family income was $56,522 (+/- $5,710). Males had a median income of $33,097 (+/- $2,008) versus $26,731 (+/- $2,569) for females. The median income for those above 16 years old was $30,455 (+/- $1,980). Approximately, 12.4% of families and 14.1% of the population were below the poverty line, including 16.9% of those under the age of 18 and 6.4% of those ages 65 or over.

=== 2010 census ===
As of the census of 2010, there were 12,415 people, 4,802 households, and 3,030 families residing in the city. The population density was 1,326.4 inhabitants per square mile (512.1/km^{2}). There were 5,646 housing units at an average density of 603.2 per square mile (232.9/km^{2}). The racial makeup of the city was 79.4% White, 3.9% African American, 2.7% Native American, 0.6% Asian, 0.1% Pacific Islander, 8.7% from other races, and 4.6% from two or more races. Hispanic or Latino of any race were 17.3% of the population.

There were 4,802 households, of which 33.8% had children under the age of 18 living with them, 43.4% were married couples living together, 13.9% had a female householder with no husband present, 5.9% had a male householder with no wife present, and 36.9% were non-families. 31.9% of all households were made up of individuals, and 13.6% had someone living alone who was 65 years of age or older. The average household size was 2.47 and the average family size was 3.07.

The median age in the city was 33.8 years. 26.4% of residents were under the age of 18; 12.7% were between the ages of 18 and 24; 23.3% were from 25 to 44; 22.7% were from 45 to 64; and 14.8% were 65 years of age or older. The gender makeup of the city was 48.3% male and 51.7% female.

== Education ==
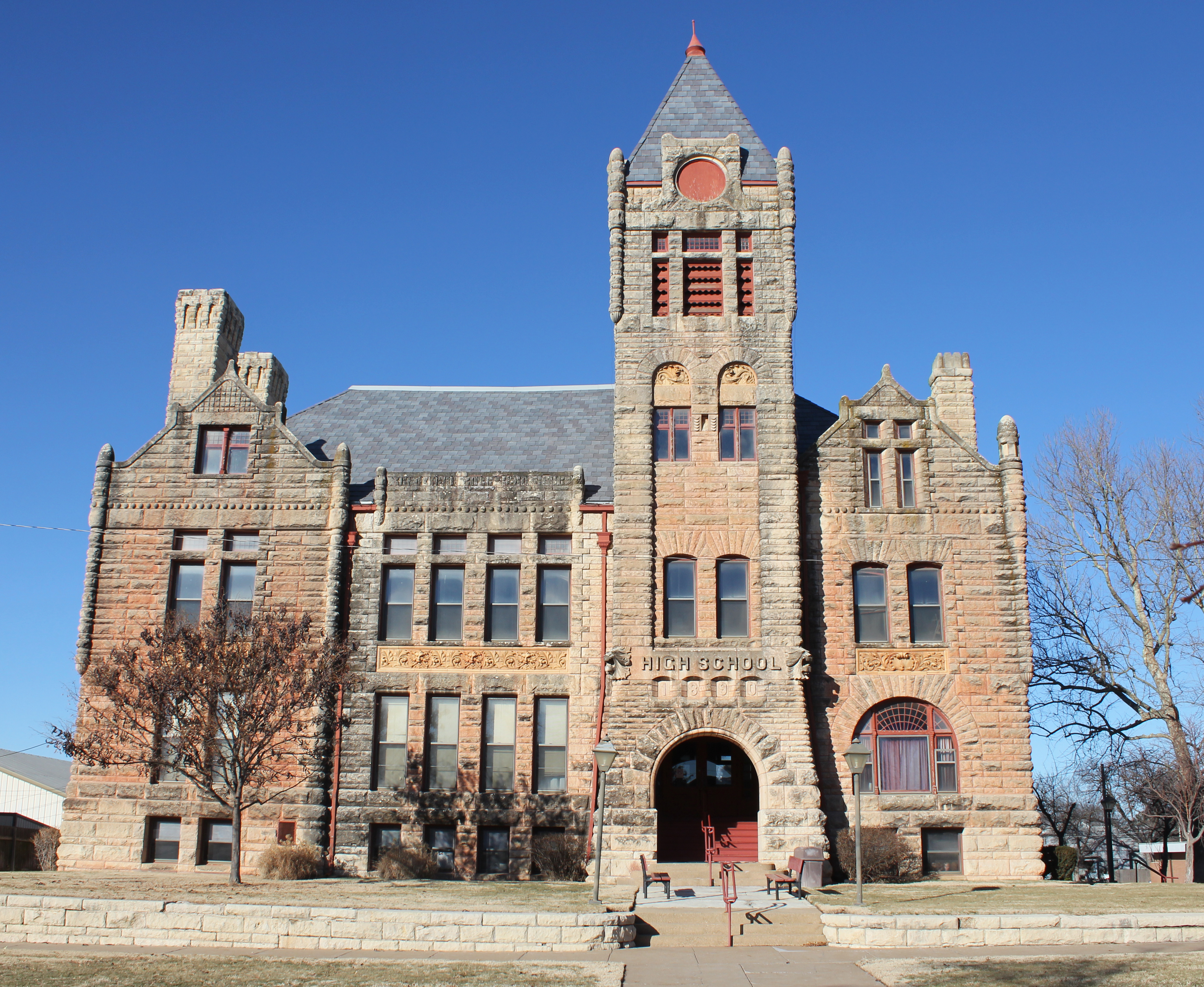
Old Arkansas City High School (2013)

The community is served by the Arkansas City USD 470 public school district.

Professor H. B. Norton first hosted a school in his home when Arkansas City was first established. The public school system began development in 1872.

Cowley College, formerly Cowley County Community College, is located between 1st and 4th streets, and Central and Adams Avenues in Arkansas City. Cowley is a community college and vocational/technical school with more than 68 majors and degree options. It began in 1922 in the basement of Arkansas City High School. Other campuses include: Aviation Tech Center (Wichita), Allied Health Center (Winfield, Kansas), Career & Technical Education Center (Mulvane, Kansas), and Bloomenshine Center (Mulvane). Its primary buildings are the Brown Center Theatre, W.S. Scott Auditorium, Renn-Memorial Library, Kerr Building, Walker Industrial Technology Building, Ben Cleveland Wellness Center, Kerr Building, Galle-Johnson Hall and four separate dormitories: Storbeck, Kirke W. Dale, Docking, and Kimmell. The college also owns one of the old high school buildings (Ireland Hall), which houses its criminal justice and cosmetology classes. The most recent building, Webb-Brown, is located on the Eastern corner of 3rd and Washington, replacing the former Ark City Junior High School.

== Media ==
=== Print ===
- The Arkansas City Traveler
- The Winfield Daily Courier for nearby Winfield

=== Radio ===
- KSOK, 1280 AM, Country
- KAXR, 91.3 FM, Religious
- KACY, 102.5 FM, Classic hits
- KYQQ, 106.5 FM, Spanish

== Notable people ==
- Maurice E. Baringer, Iowa State treasurer and state legislator
- Michael Bradford, playwright and artistic director of the Connecticut Repertory Theatre
- Darren Daulton, baseball player for the Philadelphia Phillies and Florida Marlins
- Frank Davis, American journalist, poet, political and labor movement activist, born in Arkansas City
- Robert Docking, Mayor of Arkansas City, Governor of Kansas, 1967–1975
- Robert Eaton, automobile businessman, grew up in Arkansas City
- Tim Elliott, American Mixed Martial Artist, UFC.
- Lionel Hollins, former NBA professional basketball player and former head coach of the Brooklyn Nets
- Richard Killblane, author and military historian, born in Arkansas City and attended first two years of elementary school.
- Anna Larkin, folk sculptor, lived in Arkansas City upon moving to the United States
- Delano Lewis, former US ambassador to South Africa, born in Arkansas City.
- Morris Lolar, American football coach
- Nila Mack, actress, writer and director, golden age radio program Let's Pretend
- Dick Metz, professional golfer, born in Arkansas City
- Leslie Miller, former professional football player, born in Arkansas City
- Jack Mitchell, football head coach, Arkansas and Kansas, born in Arkansas City
- Billy Mize, musician, born in Arkansas City
- Willie Oates, philanthropist, social activist, and politician, born in Arkansas City
- Helen Parsons, biochemist, born in Arkansas City
- Jim Sheets, Republican politician in Arkansas, former executive director of Kiwanis International Foundation
- Euclid Sherwood, commonly known as Motorhead Sherwood, vocalist and saxophonist for The Mothers of Invention during the band's early years
- Sara Sothern, actress, mother of Elizabeth Taylor

== See also ==
- National Register of Historic Places listings in Cowley County, Kansas
- List of Kansas railroads
