= Mawdsley =

Mawdsley is a surname. Notable people with the surname include:

- Andrés Aguilar Mawdsley (1924–1995), Venezuelan lawyer and diplomat
- Barbara Mawdsley, the name of M, a fictional character in Ian Fleming's James Bond series
- Evan Mawdsley (born 1945), British historian
- James Mawdsley (trade unionist) (1848–1902), English trade unionist and Conservative Party candidate
- James Mawdsley (born 1973), Traditionalist Catholic priest
- Richard Mawdsley (born 1945), American artist known for his work in metalsmithing
- Robert Mawdsley (born 1953), British serial killer responsible for the murders of four people
- Sharlene Mawdsley (born 1998), Irish athlete

== See also ==
- Capt. John Mawdsley House, one of the oldest houses in Newport, Rhode Island
- Maudsley
- Maudslay (disambiguation)
