= Winfield, Kansas =

City in Cowley County, Kansas

- City and county seat
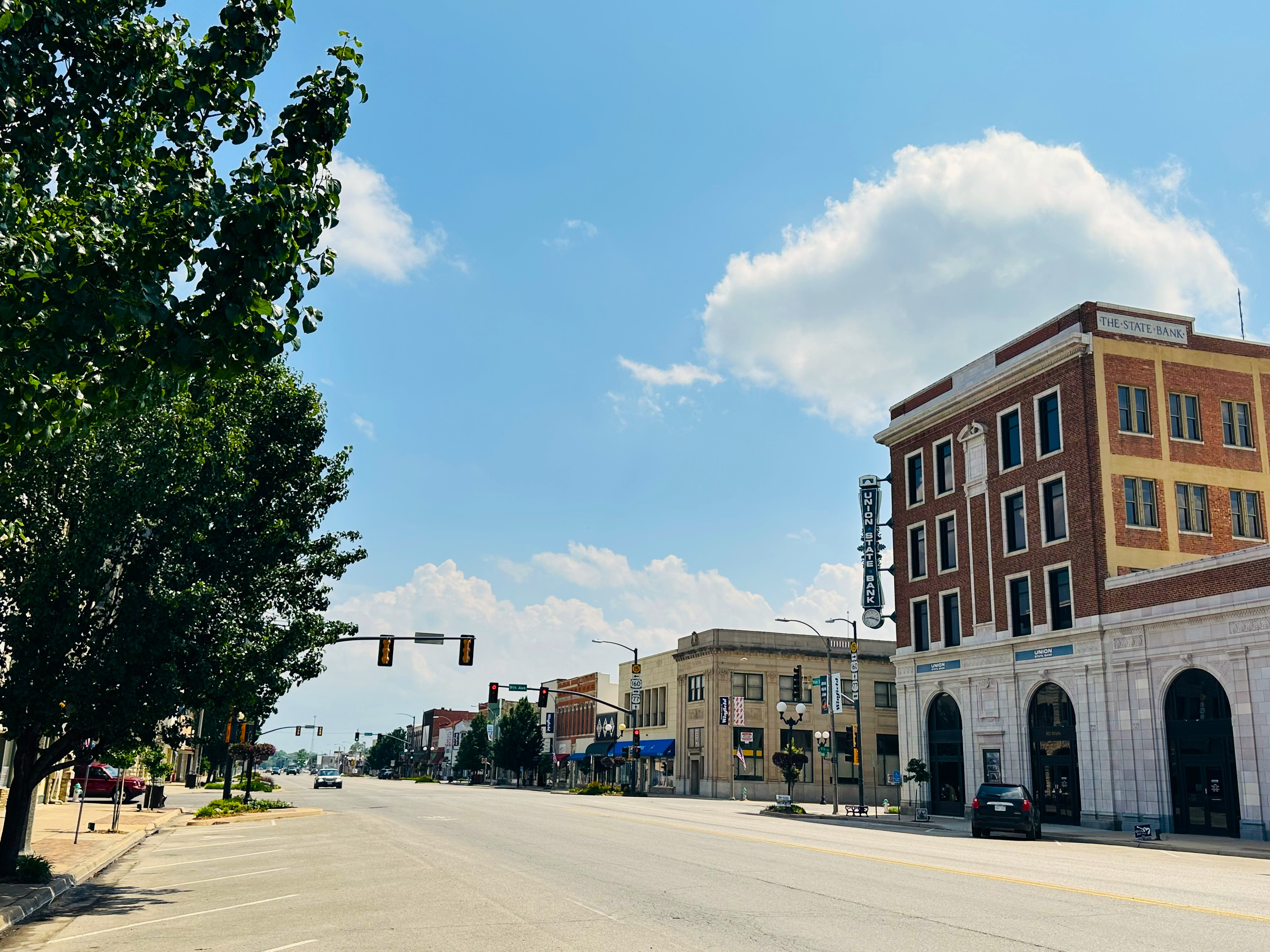
- Downtown Winfield in June 2023

- Location within Cowley County and Kansas

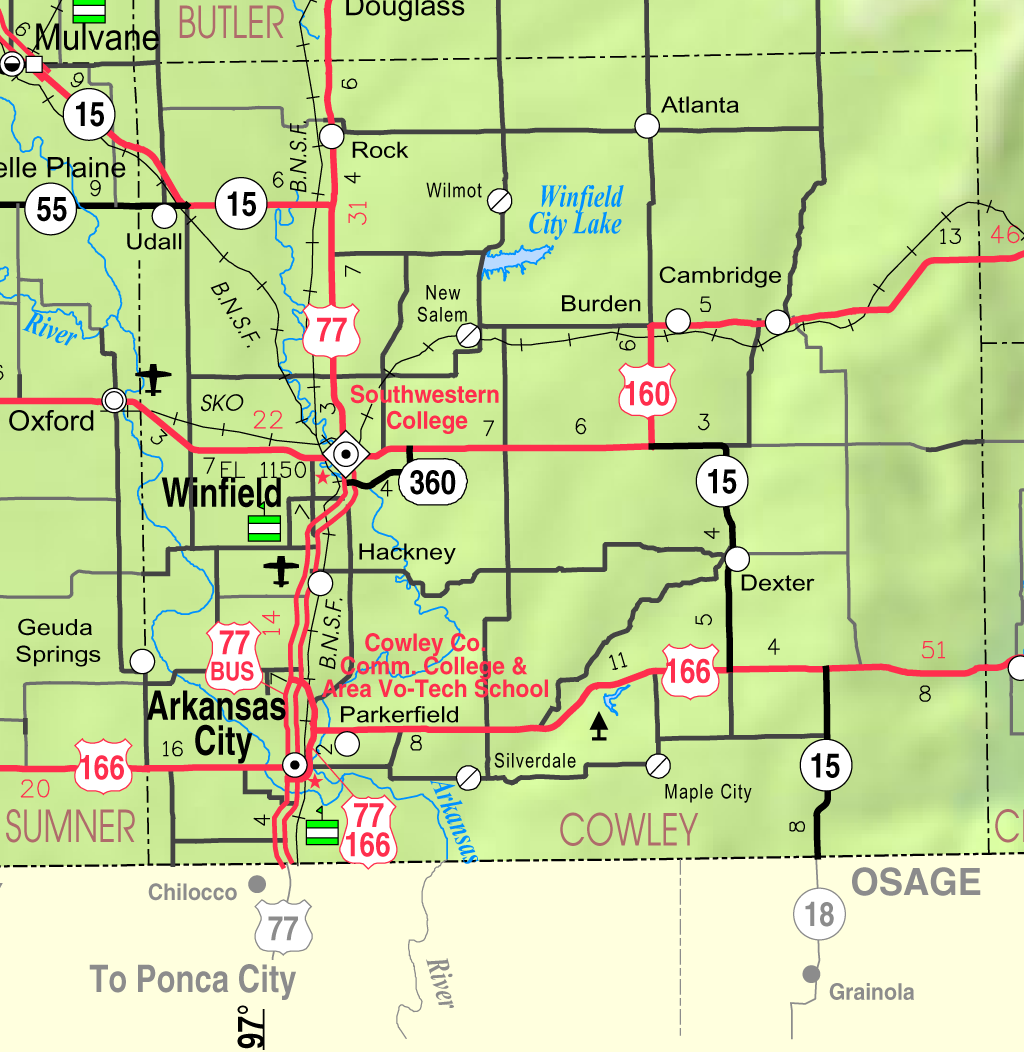
- KDOT map of Cowley County (legend)
- Coordinates: 37°14′16″N 96°59′07″W
- Country: United States
- State: Kansas
- County: Cowley
- Township: Walnut, Vernon, P.V.
- Founded: 1870 (156 years ago)
- Incorporated: 1873 (153 years ago)
- Named for: Winfield Scott

Government
  - City manager: Taggart Wall

Area
  - Total: 12.51 sq mi (32.41 km^{2})
  - Land: 11.14 sq mi (28.86 km^{2})
  - Water: 1.37 sq mi (3.55 km^{2}) 10.60%
- Elevation: 1,139 ft (347 m)

Population (2020)
  - Total: 11,777
  - Density: 1,057/sq mi (408.1/km^{2})
- Time zone: UTC-6 (CST)
  - Summer (DST): UTC-5 (CDT)
- ZIP Code: 67156
- Area code: 620
- FIPS code: 20-79950
- GNIS ID: 485663
- Website: winfieldks.org

Winfield is a city in and the county seat of Cowley County, Kansas, United States. It is situated along the Walnut River in south central Kansas. As of the 2020 census, the population of the city was 11,777. It is home to Southwestern College.

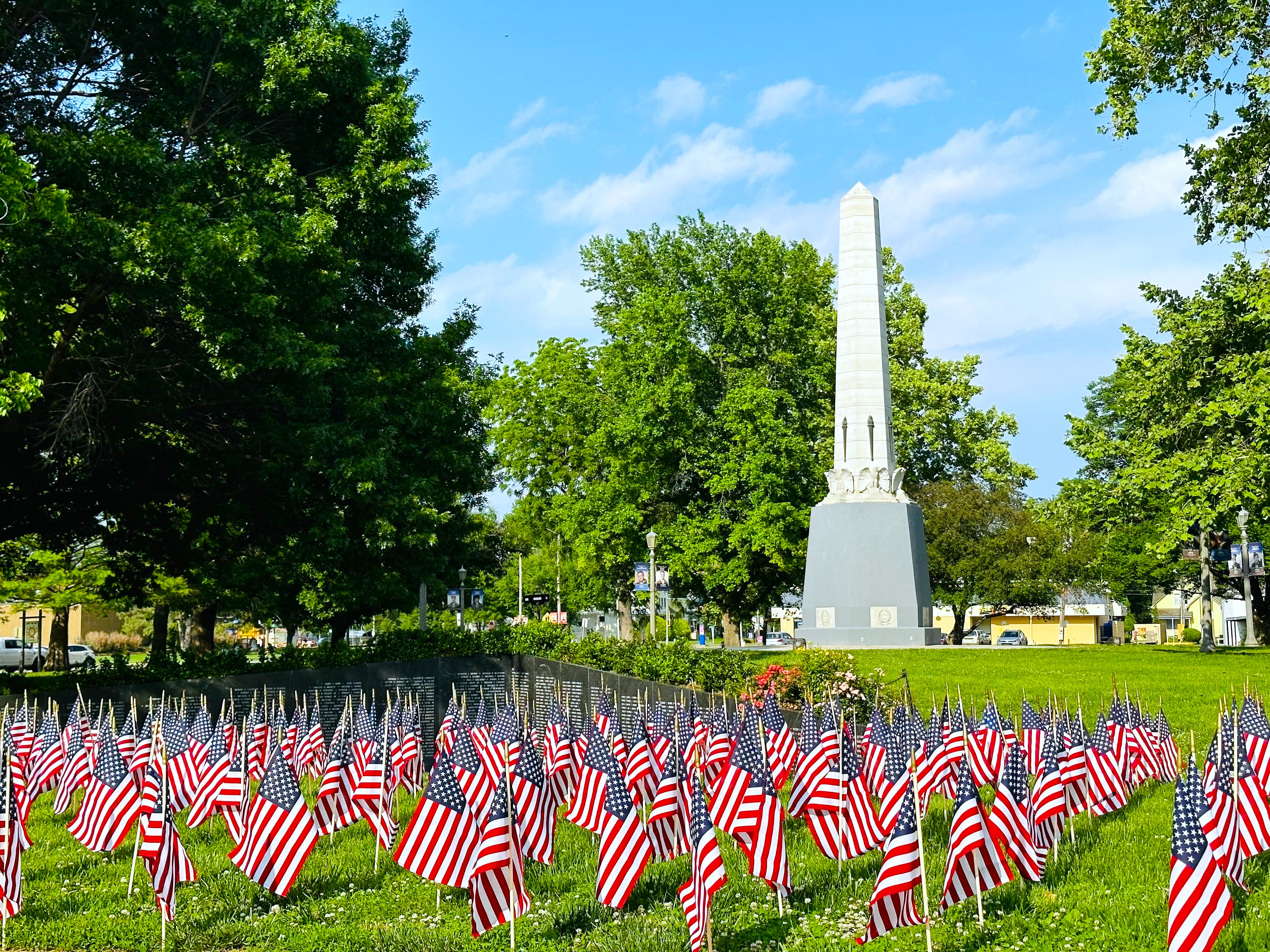
Veterans Memorial Park in downtown Winfield, 2023

== History ==
=== 19th century ===
Winfield was founded in 1870. It was named for Rev. Winfield Scott, who promised to build the town a church in exchange for the naming rights. The first post office at Winfield was established in May 1870. In 1873, Winfield incorporated as a city.

==== Railroads ====
Railroads reached Winfield in the late 1870s, and finished at Arkansas City in 1881. Eventually, a total of five railroads passed through Winfield.

==== State mental hospital ====
In 1881, the State of Kansas established the Kansas State Asylum for Idiotic and Imbecile Youth, temporarily established at Lawrence, but moved to Winfield in 1887/1888, where it served as a dominant local employer for 117 years.

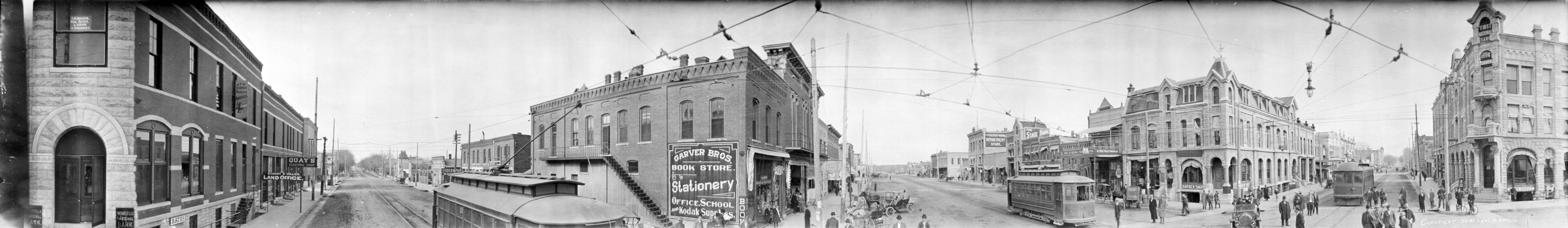
Winfield panorama (1910)

=== 20th century ===
The Winfield–Arkansas City area became an industrial community in the 20th century, manufacturing consumer goods, and eventually aircraft and aircraft parts, while retaining its traditional dominant employer, the Winfield State Hospital.

==== Strother Field ====
In World War II, Winfield, along with neighboring Arkansas City, became home to a military pilot–training base, Strother Field, which remained in operation until the end of the war, bringing several thousand military personnel into the area. After the war, in the early 1950s, the field became the shared municipal airport and industrial park for Winfield and Arkansas City.

==== Aviation industry ====
The aircraft-manufacturing industry in nearby Wichita (40 mi or 64 km to the north)—one of the world's principal aircraft-manufacturing centers—provided employment for many Winfield residents, directly and indirectly. That opportunity grew substantially in the last half of the century, as General Electric's GE Aviation division, in the late 1940s, began producing engines for Wichita aircraft, and eventually in the 1960s, one of Wichita's principal manufacturers, Cessna Aircraft Company built a factory at Strother Field.

==== Crayola ====
The Crayola plant, near Winfield, was established in 1952. At the time, it was the only Crayola plant that made paints. The plant made a large part of the jobs in the county. Tours were conducted until 1992, and five years later, in 1997, the plant shut down and the paint-making equipment was moved to Pennsylvania. Lots of crayons and memorabilia from the plant can still be seen at the Winfield Historical Society museum.

==== Institutions ====
The Winfield State Hospital and Training Center, established in the community in the prior century to house and confine the mentally ill and developmentally disabled, remained as a dominant local employer throughout the 20th century. Towards the end of the century the (now designated "Winfield State Hospital and Training Center") housed developmentally disabled people. Social, political and legal changes, led to closing of most of the facility in 1998. It was gradually turned into the Winfield Correctional Facility.

Southwestern College grew to become a leading local institution and employer, drawing students from throughout the central United States, and bringing an extra level of intellectual and cultural development and diversity to the community.

Pi Gamma Mu International Honor Society in Social Sciences was founded at Southwestern College in Winfield in 1924. The international headquarters is now housed at a repurposed Carnegie Library building on Millington Street in downtown Winfield. Pi Gamma Mu is the oldest and preeminent interdisciplinary social science honor society. Its mission is to encourage and promote excellence in the Social Sciences and to uphold and nurture scholarship, leadership, and service.

=== 21st century ===
In the 21st century, Winfield remained an industrial and institutional town. With the exception of Cessna, most of the area's major employers (some under new names and ownership) continued into the early 21st century.

== 1902 shooting ==
On August 13, 1903, 35-year-old Gilbert Twigg, armed with a 12-gauge double-barrelled shotgun, opened fire at a concert, killing six people and wounding at least 25, before killing himself.

== Geography ==
Winfield is situated along the Walnut River at its confluence with Timber Creek. It is located 17 miles (27 km) north of the Kansas-Oklahoma state border at the junction of U.S. Routes 77 and 160. State highway route K-15 follows U.S. Route 77 to the north of the city and U.S. Route 160 to the east. K-360 is a bypass around the southeastern part of the city between U.S. Route 77 and U.S. Route 160. Arkansas City is 13 miles (21 km) south of Winfield along U.S. Route 77, and Strother Field, a general aviation airport, is approximately five miles (8 km) south.

According to the United States Census Bureau, the city has a total area of 12.93 square miles (33.49 km^{2}), of which 11.56 square miles (29.94 km^{2}) is land and 1.37 square miles (3.55 km^{2}) is water.

=== Climate ===
According to the Köppen Climate Classification system, Winfield has a humid subtropical climate, abbreviated "Cfa" on climate maps. The hottest temperature recorded in Winfield was 118 °F (47.8 °C) on August 12, 1936, while the coldest temperature recorded was −27 °F (−32.8 °C) on February 13, 1905.

Climate data for Winfield, Kansas, 1991–2020 normals, extremes 1894–present
| Month | Jan | Feb | Mar | Apr | May | Jun | Jul | Aug | Sep | Oct | Nov | Dec | Year |
|---|---|---|---|---|---|---|---|---|---|---|---|---|---|
| Record high °F (°C) | 77 (25) | 88 (31) | 94 (34) | 98 (37) | 102 (39) | 110 (43) | 115 (46) | 118 (48) | 110 (43) | 100 (38) | 87 (31) | 81 (27) | 118 (48) |
| Mean maximum °F (°C) | 66.6 (19.2) | 72.9 (22.7) | 80.5 (26.9) | 85.8 (29.9) | 90.0 (32.2) | 95.9 (35.5) | 101.3 (38.5) | 100.6 (38.1) | 95.9 (35.5) | 87.6 (30.9) | 76.2 (24.6) | 67.2 (19.6) | 102.9 (39.4) |
| Mean daily maximum °F (°C) | 44.2 (6.8) | 49.2 (9.6) | 59.1 (15.1) | 68.4 (20.2) | 76.5 (24.7) | 85.7 (29.8) | 91.1 (32.8) | 90.2 (32.3) | 82.2 (27.9) | 70.8 (21.6) | 57.6 (14.2) | 46.1 (7.8) | 68.4 (20.2) |
| Daily mean °F (°C) | 32.2 (0.1) | 36.4 (2.4) | 46.0 (7.8) | 55.5 (13.1) | 65.2 (18.4) | 74.6 (23.7) | 79.7 (26.5) | 78.1 (25.6) | 70.0 (21.1) | 57.8 (14.3) | 45.2 (7.3) | 34.8 (1.6) | 56.3 (13.5) |
| Mean daily minimum °F (°C) | 20.2 (−6.6) | 23.6 (−4.7) | 32.9 (0.5) | 42.5 (5.8) | 53.9 (12.2) | 63.5 (17.5) | 68.2 (20.1) | 66.0 (18.9) | 57.8 (14.3) | 44.8 (7.1) | 32.8 (0.4) | 23.4 (−4.8) | 44.1 (6.7) |
| Mean minimum °F (°C) | 4.2 (−15.4) | 7.7 (−13.5) | 16.6 (−8.6) | 27.5 (−2.5) | 38.9 (3.8) | 52.1 (11.2) | 58.9 (14.9) | 55.6 (13.1) | 42.3 (5.7) | 28.9 (−1.7) | 16.9 (−8.4) | 8.3 (−13.2) | 0.3 (−17.6) |
| Record low °F (°C) | −20 (−29) | −27 (−33) | −3 (−19) | 15 (−9) | 26 (−3) | 40 (4) | 48 (9) | 45 (7) | 30 (−1) | 12 (−11) | 2 (−17) | −15 (−26) | −27 (−33) |
| Average precipitation inches (mm) | 1.10 (28) | 1.54 (39) | 2.91 (74) | 4.05 (103) | 6.02 (153) | 5.69 (145) | 4.26 (108) | 4.53 (115) | 3.13 (80) | 3.67 (93) | 2.12 (54) | 1.67 (42) | 40.69 (1,034) |
| Average snowfall inches (cm) | 2.4 (6.1) | 2.4 (6.1) | 1.3 (3.3) | 0.0 (0.0) | 0.0 (0.0) | 0.0 (0.0) | 0.0 (0.0) | 0.0 (0.0) | 0.0 (0.0) | 0.0 (0.0) | 0.3 (0.76) | 2.6 (6.6) | 9.0 (23) |
| Average precipitation days (≥ 0.01 in) | 4.9 | 5.0 | 7.2 | 8.3 | 11.0 | 9.4 | 8.2 | 7.7 | 7.0 | 7.4 | 5.8 | 5.3 | 87.2 |
| Average snowy days (≥ 0.1 in) | 1.7 | 1.2 | 0.7 | 0.1 | 0.0 | 0.0 | 0.0 | 0.0 | 0.0 | 0.1 | 0.2 | 1.4 | 5.4 |
Source 1: NOAA
Source 2: National Weather Service

== Demographics ==
Historical population
| Census | Pop. | Note | %± |
|---|---|---|---|
| 1870 | 472 | | — |
| 1880 | 2,844 | | 502.5% |
| 1890 | 5,184 | | 82.3% |
| 1900 | 5,554 | | 7.1% |
| 1910 | 6,700 | | 20.6% |
| 1920 | 7,933 | | 18.4% |
| 1930 | 9,398 | | 18.5% |
| 1940 | 9,506 | | 1.1% |
| 1950 | 10,264 | | 8.0% |
| 1960 | 11,117 | | 8.3% |
| 1970 | 11,405 | | 2.6% |
| 1980 | 10,736 | | −5.9% |
| 1990 | 11,931 | | 11.1% |
| 2000 | 12,206 | | 2.3% |
| 2010 | 12,301 | | 0.8% |
| 2020 | 11,777 | | −4.3% |
| 2023 (est.) | 11,669 | | −0.9% |
U.S. Decennial Census; 2010-2020

=== 2020 census ===
As of the 2020 census, Winfield had a population of 11,777. The median age was 38.3 years. 20.8% of residents were under the age of 18 and 19.0% of residents were 65 years of age or older. For every 100 females there were 105.6 males, and for every 100 females age 18 and over there were 107.3 males age 18 and over. The population density was 1,057.2 per square mile (408.1/km^{2}).

97.8% of residents lived in urban areas, while 2.2% lived in rural areas.

There were 4,532 households in Winfield, of which 28.0% had children under the age of 18 living in them. Of all households, 40.6% were married-couple households, 20.5% were households with a male householder and no spouse or partner present, and 31.3% were households with a female householder and no spouse or partner present. About 34.5% of all households were made up of individuals and 15.0% had someone living alone who was 65 years of age or older.

There were 5,240 housing units, of which 13.5% were vacant. The homeowner vacancy rate was 3.3% and the rental vacancy rate was 13.0%.

Racial composition as of the 2020 census
| Race | Number | Percent |
|---|---|---|
| White | 9,454 | 80.3% |
| Black or African American | 487 | 4.1% |
| American Indian and Alaska Native | 182 | 1.5% |
| Asian | 411 | 3.5% |
| Native Hawaiian and Other Pacific Islander | 78 | 0.7% |
| Some other race | 285 | 2.4% |
| Two or more races | 880 | 7.5% |
| Hispanic or Latino (of any race) | 923 | 7.8% |

=== 2016–2020 American Community Survey ===
The 2016–2020 5-year American Community Survey estimates show that the median household income was $48,027 (with a margin of error of +/- $3,412) and the median family income $57,236 (+/- $5,345). Males had a median income of $31,570 (+/- $3,388) versus $25,677 (+/- $2,934) for females. The median income for those above 16 years old was $28,904 (+/- $3,107). Approximately, 12.5% of families and 18.7% of the population were below the poverty line, including 24.2% of those under the age of 18 and 12.7% of those ages 65 or over.

=== 2010 census ===
As of the census of 2010, there were 12,301 people, 4,600 households, and 2,848 families residing in the city. The population density was 1,064.1 inhabitants per square mile (410.9/km^{2}). There were 5,217 housing units at an average density of 451.3 per square mile (174.2/km^{2}). The racial makeup of the city was 85.7% White, 3.9% African American, 1.3% Native American, 3.9% Asian, 1.8% from other races, and 3.4% from two or more races. Hispanic or Latino people of any race were 6.1% of the population.

There were 4,600 households, of which 32.0% had children under the age of 18 living with them, 44.7% were married couples living together, 12.2% had a female householder with no husband present, 5.1% had a male householder with no wife present, and 38.1% were non-families. 32.5% of all households were made up of individuals, and 13.8% had someone living alone who was 65 years of age or older. The average household size was 2.37 and the average family size was 2.98.

The median age in the city was 36.7 years. 23% of residents were under the age of 18; 12% were between the ages of 18 and 24; 25% were from 25 to 44; 24.4% were from 45 to 64; and 15.7% were 65 years of age or older. The gender makeup of the city was 50.7% male and 49.3% female.

== Economy ==
=== 19th century ===
==== Railroads ====
In 1877, the Florence, El Dorado, and Walnut Valley Railroad Company built a branch line from Florence to El Dorado. The line was extended to Douglass then reached Winfield on October 1, 1879, and finished at Arkansas City in 1881. The line was leased and operated by the Atchison, Topeka and Santa Fe Railway. The line from Florence to El Dorado was abandoned in 1942. The original branch line connected Florence, Burns, De Graff, El Dorado, Augusta, Douglass, Rock, Akron, Winfield, Arkansas City.

The Southern Kansas and Western Railroad was completed from the east to Winfield on February 17, 1880, then continued westward, and it reached the western county line on March 16. This railroad changed its name over time as it merged or purchased by other railroads.

Eventually, a total of five railroads passed through Winfield.

==== State mental hospital ====
In 1881, The Kansas Constitution stated that the care, treatment, and education of the handicapped were responsibilities of public residential institutions. Accordingly, the Kansas State Asylum for Idiotic and Imbecile Youth was temporarily established at Lawrence, moving to Winfield in 1887.

The Kansas State Imbecile Asylum (later the Winfield State Hospital and Training Center) was established in the community in 1888, on a hill overlooking the city. For the next 117 years, it served as a dominant local employer, housing and confining those with mental problems from throughout the state of Kansas.

=== 20th century ===
==== Industry ====
The Winfield-Arkansas City area has a wide range of industrial employers—most of which emerged and developed in the 20th century. Many are based at, and around, Strother Field—a municipal airport that the two cities share.

===== Consumer goods =====
In 1916, Gott Manufacturing was established in Winfield to produce metal water coolers. Over the next 70 years, the enterprise grew into a major supplier of insulated water jugs and urns.

In 1986, Gott was acquired by Rubbermaid, a globally dominant manufacturer of rubber storage containers, and converted to producing Rubbermaid-branded products, manufacturing insulated water coolers, ice chests, outdoor-living and outdoor-storage products. Subsequent expansion of its facilities have continued into the present day.

A Crayola crayon-manufacturing plant was located in Winfield from 1952 to 1997.

===== Aviation industry =====
====== Strother Field ======
In 1942, as America entered World War II, Winfield, along with neighboring Arkansas City, began development of a shared municipal airport. However, the entry of the U.S. into the war led to military acquisition and completion of the airfield, which became Strother Field. During the war, the airfield was used for military pilot training.

In 1953, the airport reverted to shared control of Winfield and Arkansas City, and became a major industrial center for both communities, which it remains to the present.

====== GE Aviation ======
In 1951, at Strother Field, GE Aviation—an aircraft-engine division of General Electric—began producing General Electric J47 jet engines for U.S. military aircraft (notably the Boeing B-47 Stratojet intercontinental bomber, built primarily in Wichita, and also built by Douglas Aircraft at Tulsa in neighboring Oklahoma). Approximately 3,000 of those engines were produced at Strother by 1955.

With the end of the Korean War, the GE factory switched to overhauling jet engine parts and accessories. In 1962, GE began overhauling and repairing entire military jet engines (particularly J73 and J85), and related parts and accessories—ultimately processing over 6,000 jet engines between 1962 and 1975.

With the advent of business jets in the mid-1960s—led by Wichita's Learjet (using General Electric CJ-610 engines, also used on other business aircraft)—the Strother Field GE facility switched to servicing GE's business jet engines, ultimately processing over 6,000 by 1975, as the factory grew to 125,000 square feet. During those years, several hundred business jets, from around the world, flew into Strother Field to be serviced directly at the GE facility.

Subsequently, GE's Strother facility overhauled J33 military engines, and General Electric CF6 engines for "jumbo" jetliners.

In 1985, GE acquired much of the abandoned Cessna facility for use in its engine-overhaul enterprise.

====== Cessna ======
In 1967, Cessna Aircraft Company, the world's highest-volume producer of aircraft (mostly light aircraft, at the time) addressed booming demand for its smallest, most-popular aircraft, by opening a Cessna factory at Strother Field. Initially, the factory produced the Cessna 150, at that time the world's most popular two-seat light aircraft (the world's dominant pilot-training aircraft for several decades).

In 1975, Cessna also began to move the assembly of the world's most popular light aircraft, the Cessna 172, from its Wichita factory to Strother Field.

Several thousand of both aircraft models were produced at Strother Field (making it a globally major aircraft factory complex, in total unit production). The factory employed several hundred to a few thousand workers until the early 1980s recession and other factors crashed the market for light aircraft, and Cessna, following layoffs of 700 workers at Strother Field, eventually shut down the Strother Field factory in the early 1980s.

==== Institutions ====
The Winfield State Hospital and Training Center, established in the community in the prior century to house and confine the mentally ill and developmentally disabled, remained as a dominant local employer throughout the 20th century, housing and confining those with mental problems from throughout the state of Kansas—housing up to 1,492 "patients" at its maximum in 1952.

Towards the end of the century the (now designated "Winfield State Hospital and Training Center") housed developmentally disabled people. Changing social and political attitudes, and SCOTUS decisions, and conservative political economics (developmentally disabled persons supported in the community cost the state $25,000 annually, versus $130,000 for confinement in the Winfield facility), led to the gradual closing of most of the facility—despite heated protests from residents' families and local community leaders. In 1998, the Kansas Legislature officially voted to close it. At that time, it was the oldest and largest of the three Kansas state hospitals for developmentally disabled persons. When the closure of the facility was announced in 1997, the patient population had declined to only 250 residents.

The facility was gradually taken over by the Kansas Department of Corrections, and repurposed as the Winfield Correctional Facility, expanded to contain up to 556 prisoners.

=== 21st century ===
With the exception of Cessna, most of the area's major employers (some under new names and ownership) continued into the early 21st century. The Strother Field municipal airport remains the site of the area's principal industrial park, employing thousands.

In 2010, the Keystone-Cushing Pipeline (Phase II) was constructed west of Winfield, north to south through Cowley County, with much controversy over tax exemption and environmental concerns (if a leak ever occurs).

In 2011–2012, Rubbermaid (now Newell Rubbermaid) announced it was moving 200 jobs from a Texas factory to Winfield, increasing its Winfield capacity to add manufacturing of Rubbermaid's trash cans and home-organization products. Further, Rubbermaid would invest $26.6 million to expand its operations, beginning construction of a 500,000-square-foot distribution center next to its factory. In early 2017, the company was employing 1,054 people

GE Aviation, which began Winfield operations in 1947, continued, generally, until the present day, (according to a local government statement online in April 2017), now employing 750 people in the area.

Creekstone Farms beef processing plant, in neighboring Arkansas City, Kansas, employed over 600 in early 2017.

Hospitals and nursing-care facilities in Winfield and Arkansas City, combined, employed over 600 workers in early 2017—about half at William Newton Memorial Hospital in Winfield.

The Winfield Correctional Facility employed another 200.

== Arts and culture ==
=== Entertainment ===
Winfield hosts the annual Walnut Valley Festival, one of the nation's oldest and largest bluegrass and acoustic music festivals, on the third weekend of every September. Crowds have exceeded 15,000, arriving from around the nation—with hundreds of the bluegrass and acoustic music enthusiasts camping, socializing and "jamming" at the site for weeks before the festival begins. The event also often features folk music and Celtic music performances, and related cultural activities and exhibits.

== Education ==
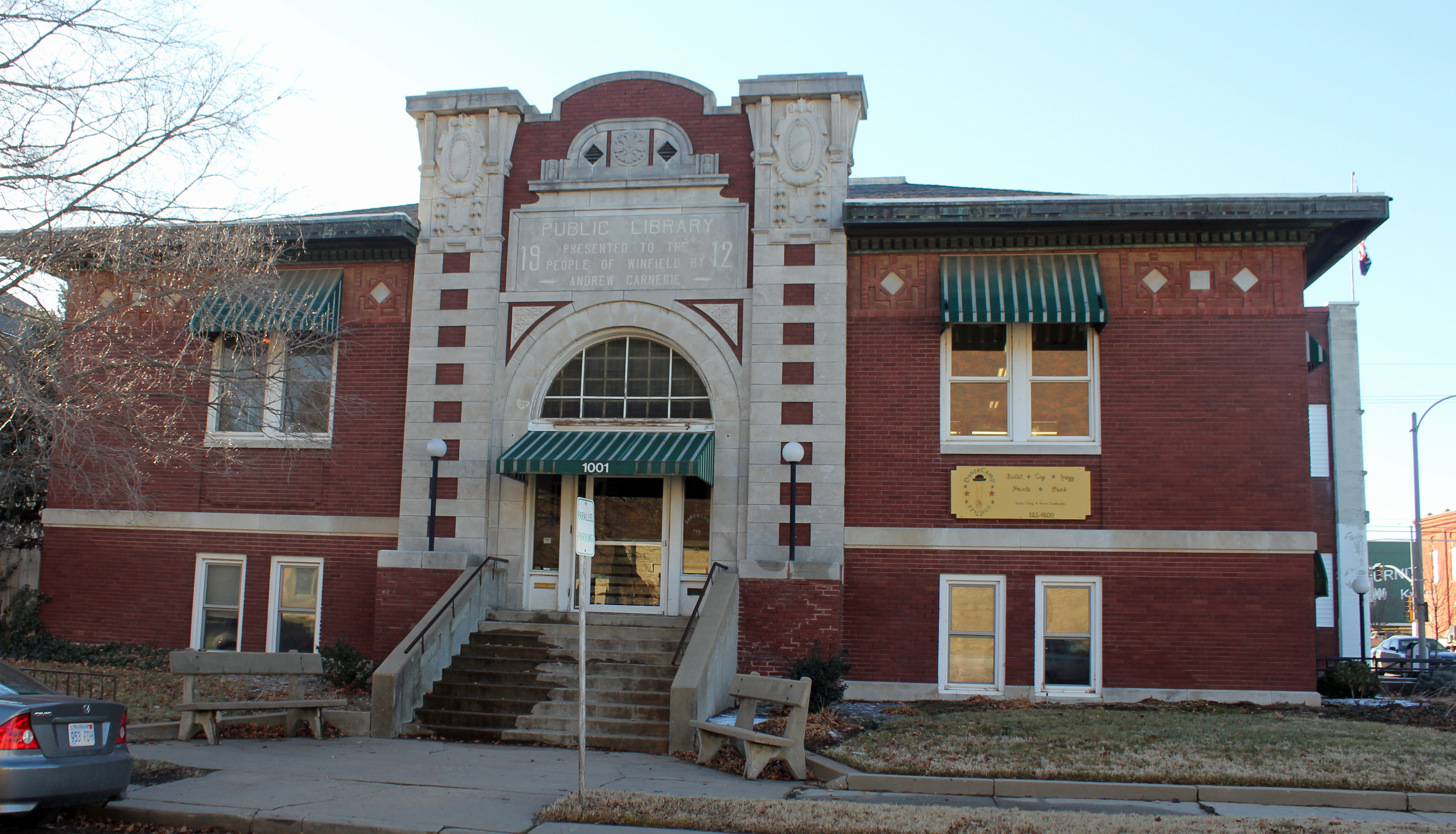
Winfield Public Carnegie Library (2013)

=== Primary and secondary education ===
The community is served by Winfield USD 465 public school district, which operates Winfield High School.

=== College ===
Southwestern College is located in Winfield. It is a four-year private higher-educational institution affiliated with the United Methodist Church.

St. John's College was located in Winfield before it closed in 1986.

== Media ==
=== Print ===
- The Cowley Courier Traveler for both Winfield and Arkansas City, formed by the merger of The Winfield Daily Courier and The Arkansas City Traveler

=== Radio ===
- KKLE, 1550 AM, News/Talk
- KBDD, 91.9 FM, Religious
- KSWC, 94.7 FM, College (low power)
- KSOK, 95.9 FM, Country
- KSOK, 103.3 FM, Classic Hits (translator for KSOK-AM)
- KSOK-AM, 1280 AM, Classic Hits
- KWLS, 107.9 FM, Country

== Notable people ==
- Robert A. Alberty (1921–2014), biophysical chemist
- Bob Brannum (1925–2005), basketball player
- Gilbert Bundy (1911–1955), cartoonist and illustrator
- Darren E. Burrows (born 1966), artist, director and actor; most notably as Ed Chigliak in the television series Northern Exposure
- Josh Clarke (1879–1962), baseball player
- Harold Corbin (1906–1988), Olympian in fencing
- Ira Davenport (1887–1941), Olympic bronze-medal winner in track and field
- Greta Goodwin (1936–2010), member Kansas Senate and Kansas House of Representatives
- John Harts (1873–1947), football coach
- Bob Kenney (1931–2014), University of Kansas NCAA National Men's Basketball Championship team in 1952, 1952 Olympic gold medal
- Richard Mawdsley (born 1945), artist known for his work in metalsmithing
- Ruth Maycliffe (1888–1981), Broadway actress
- Guy McAfee (1888–1960), law enforcement officer, owner of brothels and gambling saloons in Los Angeles and co-founder of casinos in Las Vegas
- George McDermott (1886–1937), U.S. federal judge
- Eugene Pallette (1889–1954), actor; appeared in over 240 silent-era and sound-era motion pictures
- Steve Sidwell (1944–2023), football coach
- Dean Strother (1908–2000), U.S. Air Force four-star general; Commander in Chief of the North American Air Defense Command and the Continental Air Defense Command
- Caroline Thorington (born 1943), artist
- Donald E. Voorhees (1930–2001), politician
- Karen Wheeler (born 1955), artist

== See also ==
- National Register of Historic Places listings in Cowley County, Kansas
- List of Kansas railroads
