= GWR railcars =

Railcars used on the Great Western Railway

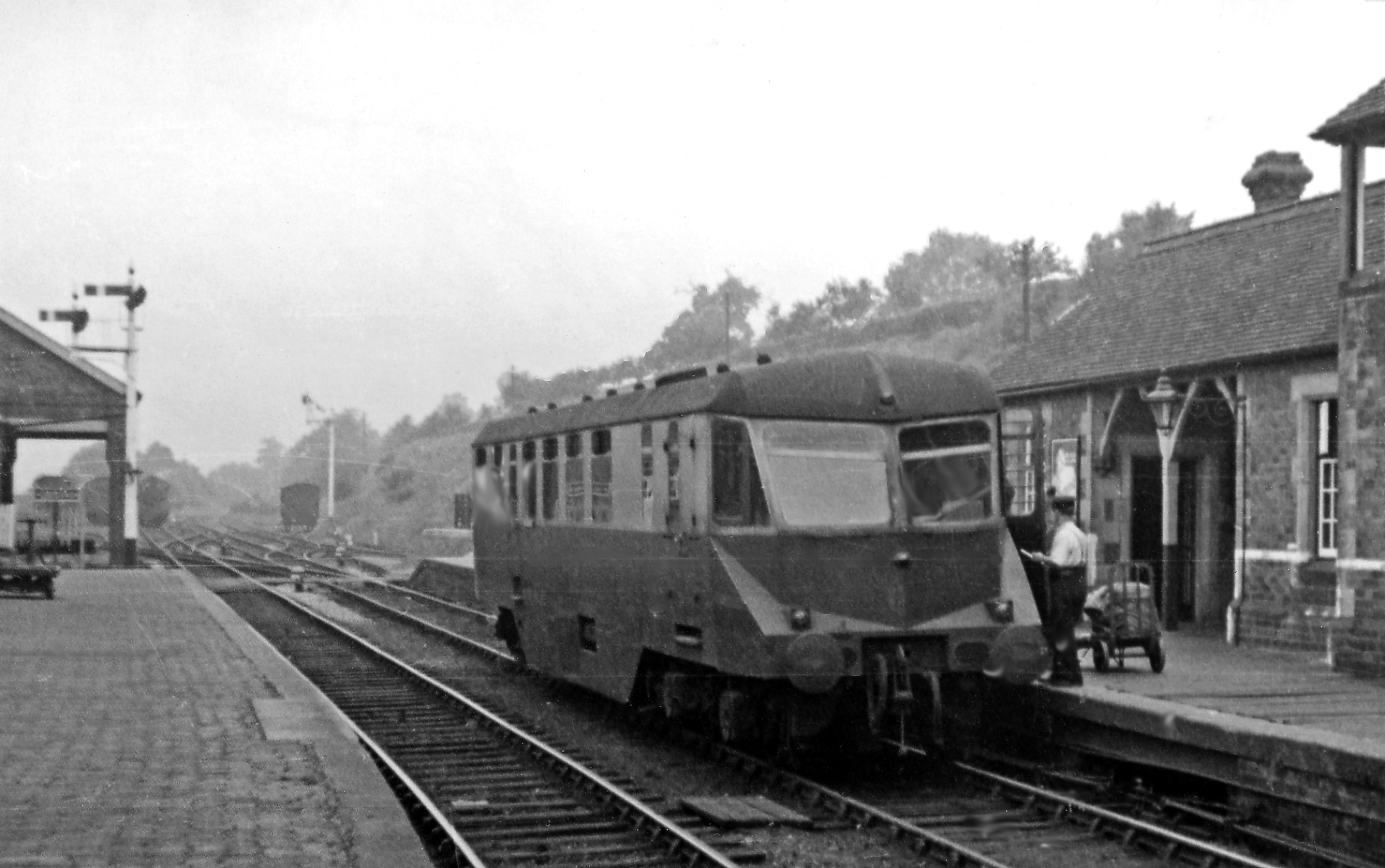
- AEC railcar No. 27 at Tenbury Wells station in 1949
- In service: 1934–1962
- Manufacturers: Hardy Motors; Park Royal; Gloucester RCW; Swindon Works
- Replaced: Steam locomotives and carriages
- Constructed: 1934–1942
- Entered service: 1934
- Scrapped: 1954–1962
- Number built: 38 cars
- Number preserved: 3 cars
- Number scrapped: 35 cars
- Successor: British Rail Class 121; British Rail Class 122
- Fleet numbers: 1–38
- Capacity: 44–70 seats
- Operator: Great Western Railway; British Railways
- Line served: Western Region

Specifications
- Maximum speed: 63 mph (101 km/h) to 80 mph (130 km/h)
- HVAC: steam heating
- Track gauge: 4 ft 8 1/2 in (1,435 mm) standard gauge

In 1933, the Great Western Railway introduced the first of what was to become a successful series of diesel railcars, which survived in regular use into the 1960s, when they were replaced with the new British Rail "first generation" diesel multiple units.

== Design ==
=== Bodywork ===
The original design featured streamlined bodywork, which was very much the fashion at the time. The rounded lines of the first examples built led to their nickname: "flying banana". The preserved W4W is an example of the original, rounded body shape. Later "razor edge" examples, such as No. 27 (pictured), had much more angular (and practical) bodywork, yet the nickname persisted for these too.

=== Heating ===
The interiors of railcars No. 1 to No. 18 were heated by using waste heat from the engine cooling water. This system proved unreliable in service due to issues with the thermostatic valves. Later vehicles abandoned this system due to its unreliability and because their revised specification demanded that they be able to haul steam-heated rolling stock.

These later vehicles, No. 19 onwards, were equipped with steam heating systems which were capable of heating both the vehicle's interior and that of any additional trailed vehicles, via a steam supply to the standard steam heating equipment. Steam was produced by a fully automatic Vapor Clarkson steam generator manufactured by Gresham and Craven Ltd under licence from the Vapor Car co. The generator was of the water tube with counterflow arrangement type, and could supply up to 300 lb of steam per hour, at 45 lb per square inch. The quantity of steam supplied could be varied by the driver to suit the demands of a solo railcar, or plus one, or plus two, trailer vehicles. The fuel was the same diesel as was used by the railcar's engines, drawn from a separate 45-gallon tank. The water supply for the heating system was a single 100-gallon tank.

=== Powertrain ===
Railcars No. 1 to No. 18 were powered by a high-speed diesel engine manufactured by A.E.C, producing a maximum brake power output of 130 hp (97 kW). The engine was of the straight 6 configuration, with a bore of 115 mm diameter and a stroke of 142 mm. This gave a total displacement of 8.85 litres. The maximum operating speed was 1,800 rpm.

Railcars No. 19 onwards were powered by a modified version of the previous engine. This engine was equipped with direct injection and the bore diameter was enlarged to 120 mm, the stroke remaining at 142 mm. This engine produced a lower brake power output of 105 hp at 1,650 rpm.

An unusual feature was the external cardan shaft drive from the gearbox on the rear of a horizontally mounted engine to road-vehicle style reduction boxes outboard of the two axles on one bogie. Later units had two such engine-and-drive combinations placed on opposite sides. Railcars 19–20 were fitted with a separate high-low ratio gearbox on the final drive side of the gearbox, which allowed a top speed of about 60–70 mph (97–113 km/h) in high and about 40–45 mph (64–72 km/h) in low. Railcar W20W retains this in preservation.

=== Brakes ===
The brake system on railcars No. 2, 3 and 4 was unconventional. Instead of the usual vacuum-actuated tread brakes used on most British rolling stock of the period, an automotive-style system was adopted, utilising vacuum-hydraulically actuated drum brakes. A vacuum brake cylinder and hydraulic master cylinder set was mounted on each bogie. From the master cylinder, hydraulic fluid passed through hoses to the operating cylinders. The operating cylinders actuated cam mechanisms within the brake drums to apply the internally expanding brake shoes to the inside circumference of the drums. The 20-inch internal diameter cast steel brake drums were bolted to the inside face of one wheel per axle.

The vacuum necessary for brake operation was created by three rotary exhausters, two being driven directly from the engines (one by each engine). The third exhauster was chain-driven by the final drive shaft. This arrangement allowed vacuum to be maintained during coasting, when the engines would be idling. The system operated at a vacuum of 22 to 24 inches of mercury, stored in four reservoirs on the chassis. Another unusual aspect to this system was that vacuum was increased in the vacuum brake cylinder to apply the brakes, this being contrary to normal British railway practice, in which the vacuum is reduced to apply the brakes.

== Operational history ==
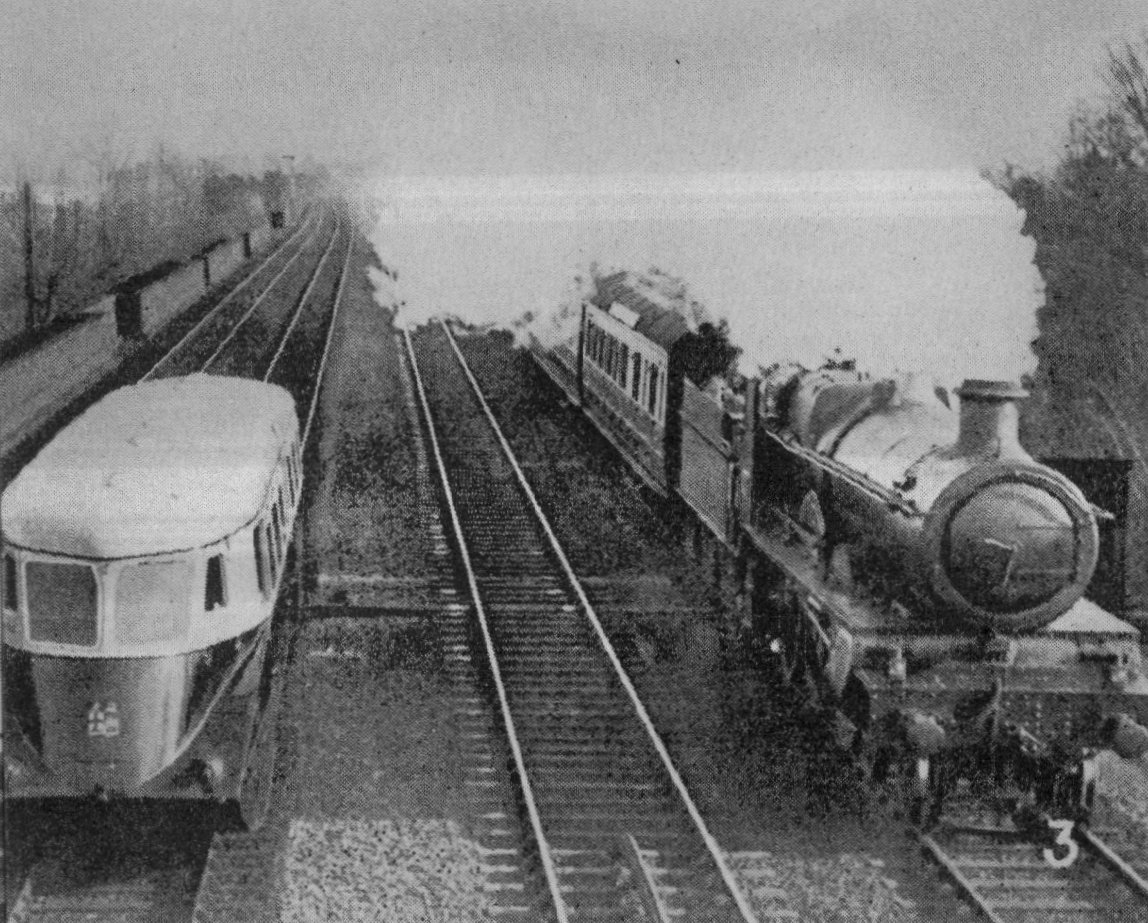
1934 publicity photograph.

Constructed by the Hardy Rail Motors subsidiary of AEC, the prototype unit, No. 1, made its first run on 1 December 1933 between London Paddington and Reading with a large number of press representatives. Three days later, the unit was allocated to Southall DMU Depot to operate on various services from Southall to Slough, Windsor, Henley-on-Thames, Reading and Didcot. Within the same month, the unit was taken out of service for modifications to be made to its braking systems as well as improvements to the engine suspension. Automatic train control was installed during this time, and the unit was sent back into service proper on 5 February 1934, again operating out of Southall depot along the Thames Valley lines.

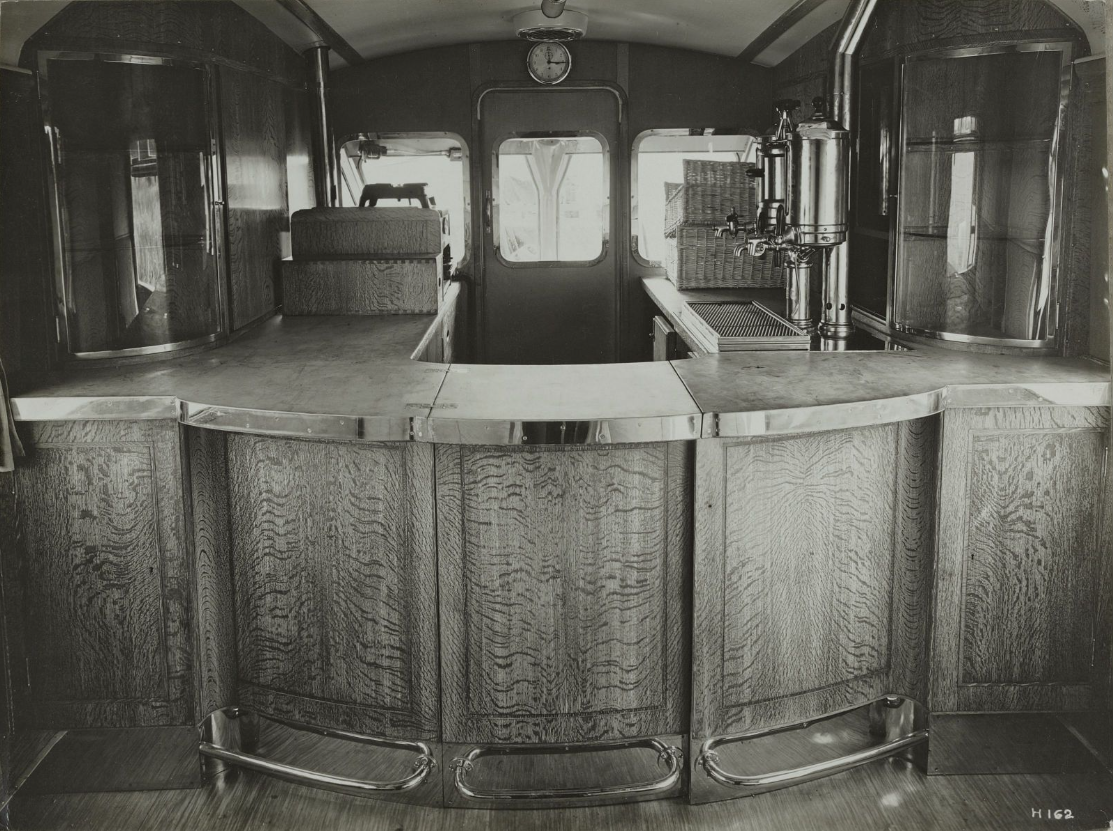
Buffet counter in railcar No. 2

Due to the popularity of railcar No. 1, in February 1934 the GWR ordered a further six production units, Nos. 2 to 7, which were built with two engines (instead of one) allowing them to reach a maximum speed of 80 mph (130 km/h). Nos. 2 to 4 would be built by Park Royal with a buffet and two lavatories for use on express services. These units were delivered five months later in July 1934, with a trial run being undertaken on 6 July 1934 between Birmingham Snow Hill and Cardiff General. Proper service would commence with the summer timetable on 9 July 1934, with two of the new railcars operating from Birmingham Snow Hill to Cardiff, Gloucester and Newport, although one of the units was not able to begin running until the 16 July 1934. These were amongst the first long-distance diesel express services in Britain, with the 117.5 miles (189.1 km) of the Birmingham to Cardiff route being covered in 2 hours 20 minutes, at an average speed of 50 mph (80 km/h). This was intended as a businessman's service; fares were charged at the normal rate, although bookings were limited by the 44 seats of the railcar.

The next three units of the first batch order, Nos. 5 to 7, were built by Gloucester RCW, with No.7 entering service in July 1935 in time for the summer timetable, No.5 following on the 22 July, and No.6 on 30 August. All three units had 68 seats, due to the absence of lavatories and a buffet. They were used on services between London, Oxford and Hereford. A second batch of units, Nos. 8 to 17, was ordered by GWR and again built by Gloucester RCW before Nos. 5 to 7 had been delivered, with Nos. 8, 9, 13 to 16 being the same as these prior units. Meanwhile, Nos. 10 to 12 were outfitted with a lavatory, bringing their seating capacity down to 63, and were placed on the cross-country service from Bristol to Weymouth and Salisbury from 17 February 1935. The rest of the Gloucester units were placed into service on 16 March 1935 between Tenby, Carmarthen and Swansea, 23 March between Monmouth, Pontypool and Newport, 6 April between March, Cheltenham, Swindon and Marlborough, and finally 14 April between Birmingham, Stratford-upon-Avon and Hatton.

Unlike all the prior units, which were built for passenger services, No. 17 was built for express parcels services, being placed into service from 4 May 1936. This was done primarily as an experiment, and to increase the punctuality of stopping passenger services out of London by having parcels moved by a dedicated unit. This would ultimately prove a success, with No. 17 operating from London Paddington to Kensington, Messrs. Lyons to Reading and Oxford, Oxford to London Paddington, and then from London Paddington to Reading and back, a daily distance of 222 miles (357 km).

No. 18, also built by Gloucester RCW, was another experimental unit, with standard buffers & draw gear, permitting it to haul up to 60 long tons (61.0 t; 67.2 short tons). This was primarily due to the single-unit railcars struggling with over-capacity due to their increasing popularity, although these units had not been fitted with proper buffers and draw gear. After a series of tests and trial runs undertaken between 1935 and 1937, the unit was put into service on the Lambourn Valley Railway, with a seating capacity of 49 on its own. It remained on the Lambourn Branch until the outbreak of World War II, where it was transferred around the western region, from Cowbridge to the branch line towards Staines, never returning to the Lamborn Branch. Notably, No. 18 was intended to have a dedicated trail coach built for it, with a drawing made in 1936 showing this proposed trailer coach, which was similar in style to No. 18. It would have had a seating capacity of 60, and would have also been fitted with a driving compartment at one end. This trailer was not built, and instead No. 18 entered into service with the standard GWR autocoaches.

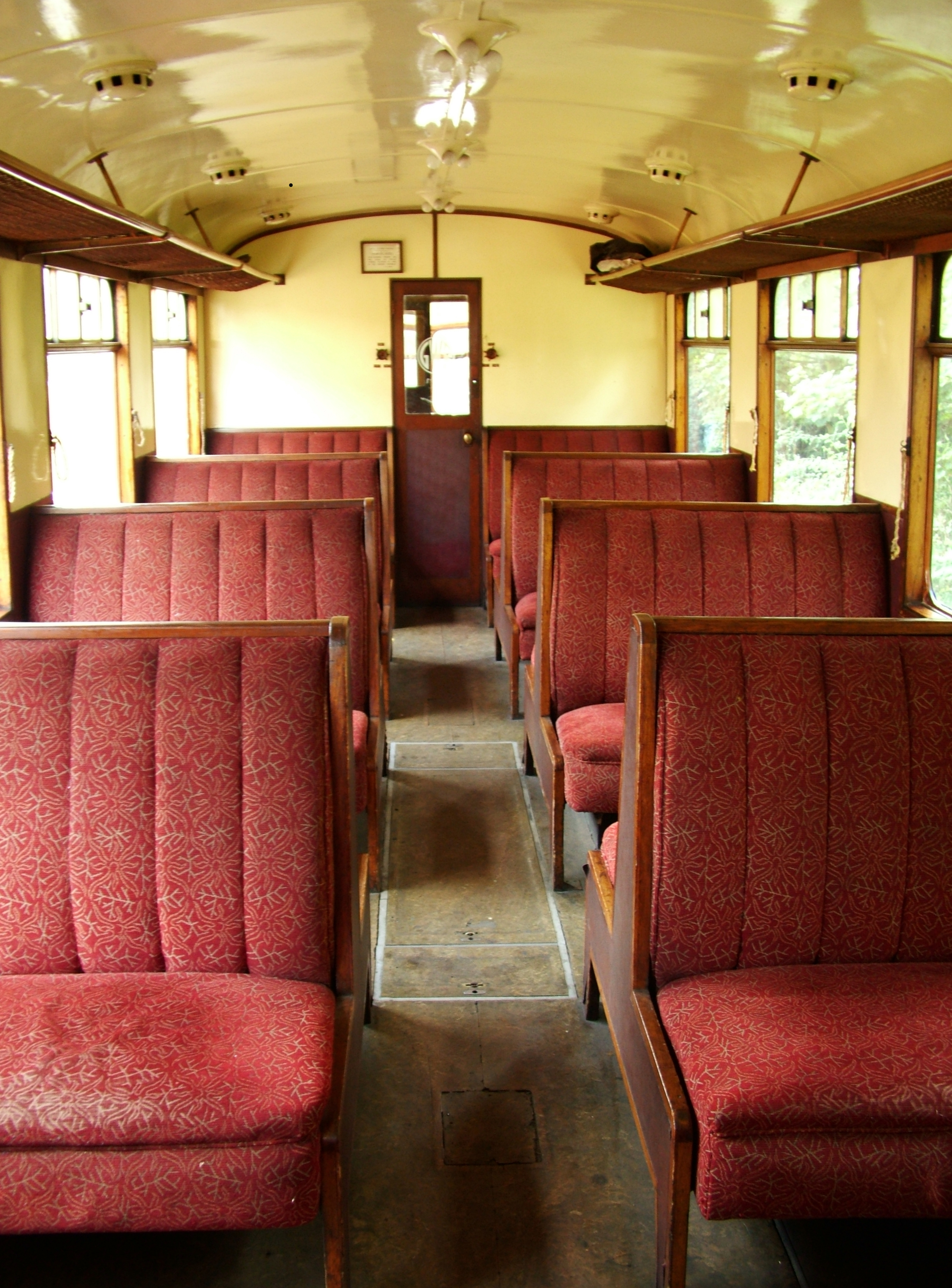
Interior of railcar No. 22

This experiment was, much like the ones before it, a success, leading to the GWR ordering a further 20 units in September 1938. This not only doubled the size of the GWR diesel railcar fleet, but was the largest order of diesel railcars placed by the Big Four railway companies at the time. The bodies of this final batch were built at the GWR's own Swindon Works, most likely due to the international climate. Nos. 19 to 33 were built primarily for branch line services, whilst No. 34 was destined for express parcels services to supplement No. 17. Nos. 35 to 38 were built as two twin-sets, fitted with buffets and lavatories, and cabs at the outer ends of the sets, and the capability for a corridor coach to be placed between the two units. These twin-sets replaced the Park Royal units, Nos. 2 to 4, on the Birmingham to Cardiff express service due to the increasing volume of traffic; the twin-sets had seating capacity for 104 passengers, increasing to 184 with the addition of the aforementioned corridor coach. The introduction of the Swindon units into service was notably slower than previous batches, primarily due to the outbreak of World War II, with the first unit being delivered in 1940, and the last in 1942, some four years after the order was placed.

All units continued operating well into the British Railways era, excluding units that were condemned due to fire damage. The first unit to be withdrawn was No. 2, in February 1954, and the last, No. 32, in November 1962.

== Fleet list ==
Number Range	Introduced	Builder	Engine	Weight (long tons)	Seats	Withdrawn	Notes
1	1934	Hardy Motors	1 AEC of 130 hp (97 kW)	24 long tons (24.4 t; 26.9 short tons)	69	1955	Prototype railcar, referred to as the "Hardy Railcar".
2–4	1934	Park Royal	2 AEC of 130 hp (97 kW)	26.2 long tons (26.6 t; 29.3 short tons)	44	1954–1958	Buffet fitted.
5–7	1935	Gloucester RCW	2 AEC of 130 hp (97 kW)	25.3 long tons (25.7 t; 28.3 short tons)	68	1957–59	Standard single car.
8–9, 13–16	1936	Gloucester RCW	2 AEC of 130 hp (97 kW)	29.5 long tons (30.0 t; 33.0 short tons)	68	1957–60	9 withdrawn in 1946 after fire.
10–12	1936	Gloucester RCW	2 AEC of 130 hp (97 kW)	29.9 long tons (30.4 t; 33.5 short tons)	63	1956–57	Lavatory fitted.
17	1936	Gloucester RCW	2 AEC of 130 hp (97 kW)	28.85 long tons (29.31 t; 32.31 short tons)	None	1959	Parcels car, capacity 10 long tons (10.2 t; 11.2 short tons).
18	1937	Gloucester RCW	2 AEC of 130 hp (97 kW)	33.6 long tons (34.1 t; 37.6 short tons)	49	1957	Prototype, with buffers & draw gear for hauling extra coaching stock and vans.
19–33	1940–41	GWR, Swindon	2 AEC of 105 hp (78 kW)	35.65 long tons (36.22 t; 39.93 short tons)	48	1960–62	33 rebuilt in 1954 to replace 37.
34	1941	GWR, Swindon	2 AEC of 105 hp (78 kW)	34.9 long tons (35.5 t; 39.1 short tons)	None	1960	Parcels car, capacity 10 long tons (10.2 t; 11.2 short tons).
35–38	1941–42	GWR, Swindon	2 AEC of 105 hp (78 kW)	36.7 long tons (37.3 t; 41.1 short tons) + 37.6 long tons (38.2 t; 42.1 short tons)	60 + 44	1957, 1962	Power twins with buffet and lavatory 35+36 and 37+38; 37 withdrawn in 1949 after fire and replaced by 33.

Five of the 38 railcars were destroyed by fires:

- No 9 was burnt out at Heyford on 24 July 1945; officially condemned in May 1946
- No 10 was burnt out at Bridgnorth on 9 March 1956; officially condemned in April 1956
- No 35 and No 36 were destroyed by fire at St Anne's Park, Bristol on 10 April 1956; officially condemned in April 1957
- No 37 was damaged by fire in February 1949 and was stored until being scrapped; officially condemned in September 1949

== Preservation ==
Three of the GWR railcars have survived into preservation:

Vehicle no.	Builder	Year built	Location	Comments	Photograph
W4W	Park Royal	1934	National Railway Museum, York	Static display	
W20W	GWR Swindon	1940	Kent & East Sussex Railway	Under restoration at Tenterden since 1983	
W22W	GWR Swindon	1940	Didcot Railway Centre	Operational	

== Models ==
Hornby Railways manufacture a model of the 1940-style railcar in OO gauge, using tooling acquired in their takeover of Lima. In late 2017, Dapol released an OO model of the streamlined 1936 Gloucester RCW railcars in a variety of liveries and numbers. Heljan manufacture a model of the 1940-style railcar in OO gauge, using new tooling, that includes internal lighting and front and rear lighting.

Graham Farish produced an N-gauge model (with various numbers, e.g. 19, 22, and 20), both before and after their takeover by Bachmann.

== See also ==
- GWR petrol-electric railcar
- GWR steam rail motors
- GNR(I) AEC Class railcars
- ČSD Class M 290.0
