= Maudslay (disambiguation) =

Henry Maudslay (1771–1831) was a British machine tool innovator, tool and die maker, and inventor.

Maudslay may also refer to:

- Maudslay, Sons and Field
- Maudslay Motor Company, a British vehicle maker
- Maudslay State Park, a Massachusetts state park

== People with the surname ==
- Alfred Maudslay (1850–1931), British colonial diplomat, explorer and archaeologist
- Algernon Maudslay (1873–1948), British sailor
- Reginald Walter Maudslay (1871-1934), founder of the Standard Motor Company

== See also ==
- Maudsley
