= New Salem, Kansas =

Unincorporated community in Cowley County, Kansas

- CDP
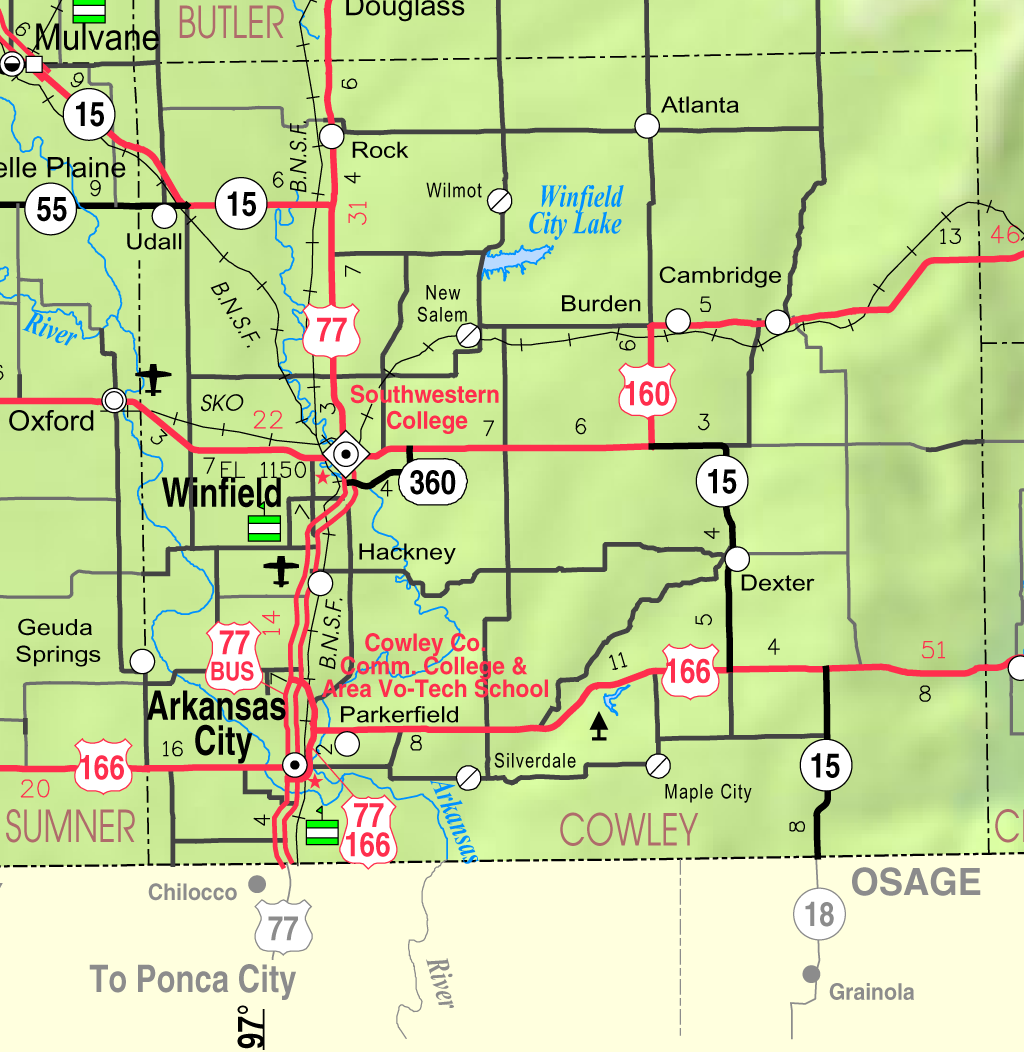
- KDOT map of Cowley County (legend)

- Location within Kansas Location within the United States
- Coordinates: 37°18′38″N 96°53′43″W
- Country: United States
- State: Kansas
- County: Cowley
- Elevation: 1,250 ft (380 m)

Population (2020)
  - Total: 58
- Time zone: UTC-6 (CST)
  - Summer (DST): UTC-5 (CDT)
- Area code: 620
- FIPS code: 20-50425
- GNIS ID: 469917

New Salem is a census-designated place (CDP) in Cowley County, Kansas, United States. As of the 2020 census, the population was 58.

== History ==
A post office was opened in New Salem in 1872, and remained in operation until it was discontinued in 1972.

== Demographics ==
Historical population
Census	Pop.	Note	%±
2020	58		—
U.S. Decennial Census

The 2020 United States census counted 58 people, 25 households, and 21 families in New Salem. The population density was 158.0 per square mile (61.0/km^{2}). There were 27 housing units at an average density of 73.6 per square mile (28.4/km^{2}). The racial makeup was 86.21% (50) white or European American (86.21% non-Hispanic white), 0.0% (0) black or African-American, 8.62% (5) Native American or Alaska Native, 0.0% (0) Asian, 0.0% (0) Pacific Islander or Native Hawaiian, 0.0% (0) from other races, and 5.17% (3) from two or more races. Hispanic or Latino of any race was 0.0% (0) of the population.

Of the 25 households, 28.0% had children under the age of 18; 76.0% were married couples living together; 8.0% had a female householder with no spouse or partner present. 16.0% of households consisted of individuals and 12.0% had someone living alone who was 65 years of age or older. The percent of those with a bachelor's degree or higher was estimated to be 0.0% of the population.

17.2% of the population was under the age of 18, 8.6% from 18 to 24, 27.6% from 25 to 44, 17.2% from 45 to 64, and 29.3% who were 65 years of age or older. The median age was 44.0 years. For every 100 females, there were 100.0 males. For every 100 females ages 18 and older, there were 100.0 males.

== Education ==
The community is served by Winfield USD 465 public school district.
