= Hackney, Kansas =

Unincorporated community in Cowley County, Kansas

- Unincorporated community
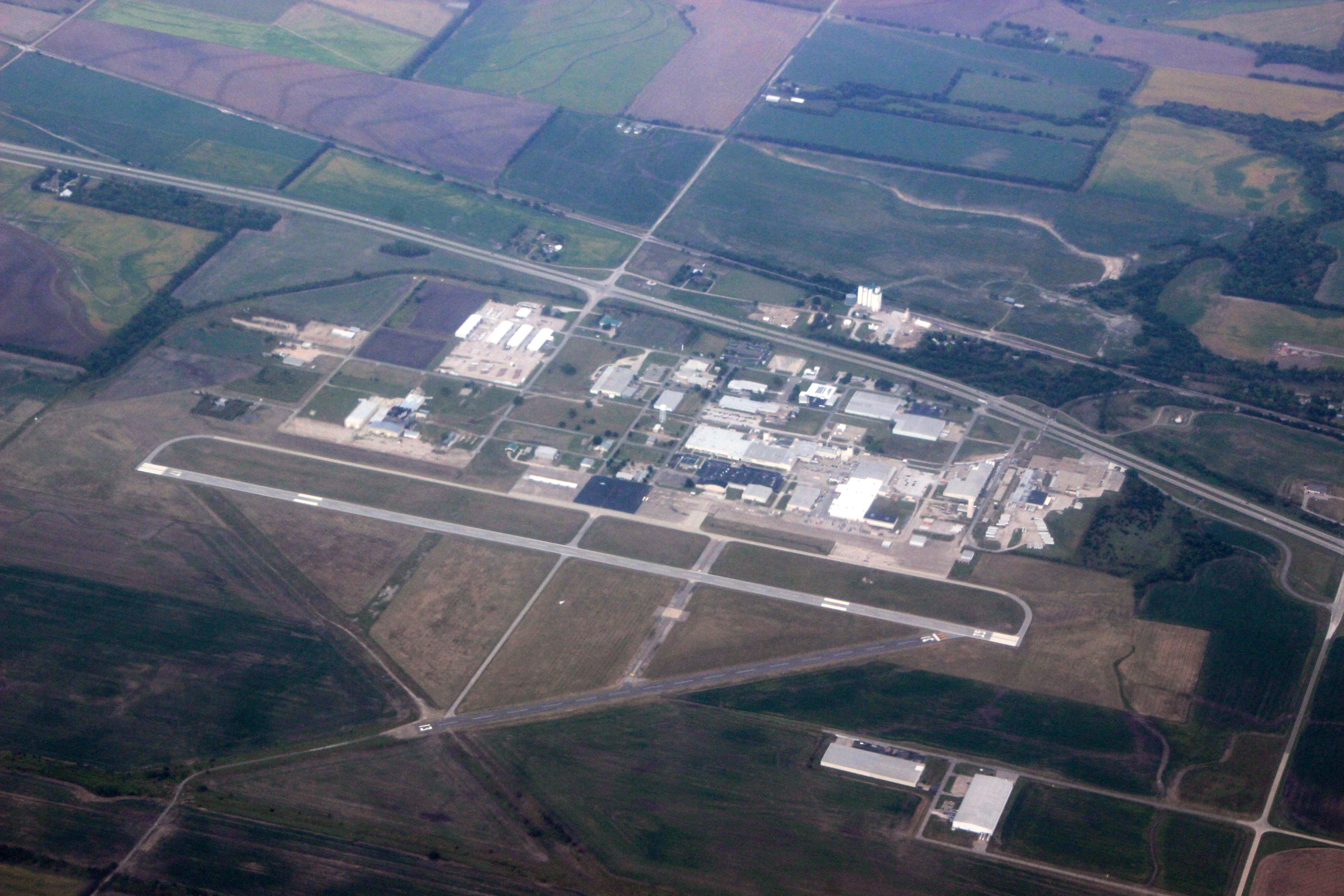
- Aerial view of Hackney, including Strother Field industrial park and airport

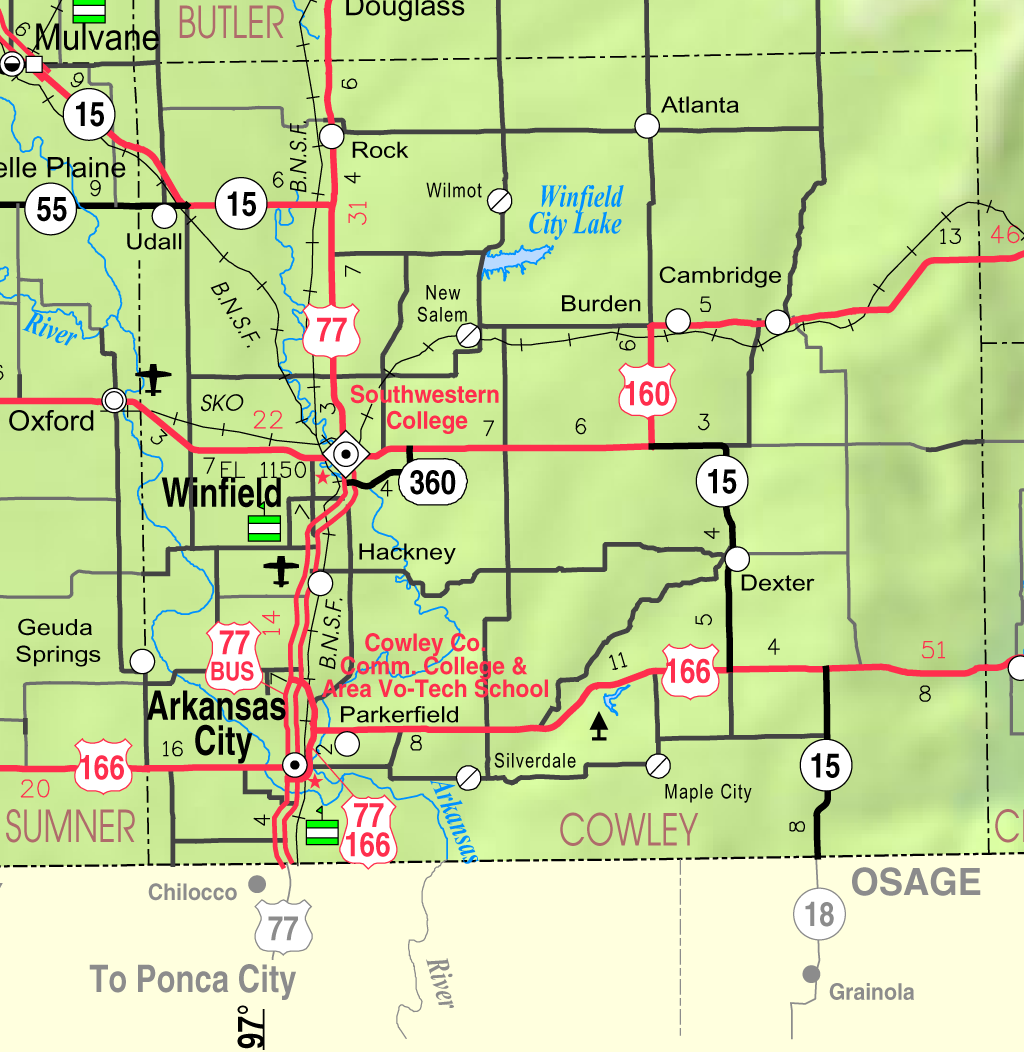
- KDOT map of Cowley County (legend)

- Location within Kansas Location within the United States
- Coordinates: 37°10′27″N 97°1′52″W
- Country: United States
- State: Kansas
- County: Cowley
- Elevation: 1,099 ft (335 m)
- Time zone: UTC-6 (CST)
  - Summer (DST): UTC-5 (CDT)
- Area code: 620
- FIPS code: 20-29375
- GNIS ID: 470349

Hackney is an unincorporated community in Cowley County, Kansas, United States.

== History ==
The town was named after William P. Hackney, a colorful frontier lawyer and politician from Cowley County. Hackney was a station and shipping point on the Atchison, Topeka and Santa Fe Railway. The post office was established March 31, 1894, and discontinued February 15, 1924.

An airport was built in the early 1940s and was used as a training airfield by the United States Army Air Forces during World War II. The airport is now called Strother Field and it is the home of Strother Field Industrial Park.

== Education ==
The community is served by Winfield USD 465 public school district.
