= Maudsley =

Maudsley is a surname. Notable people with the surname include:

- Henry Maudsley (1835–1918), English psychiatrist
- Robert Maudsley (born 1953), British serial killer
- Ron Maudsley (1918–1981), British law professor and cricketer
- Tony Maudsley (born 1968), English actor

== See also ==
- Maudsley Hospital
- Maudslay (disambiguation)
- Mawdsley
