= Tisdale, Kansas =

Unincorporated community in Cowley County, Kansas

- Unincorporated community
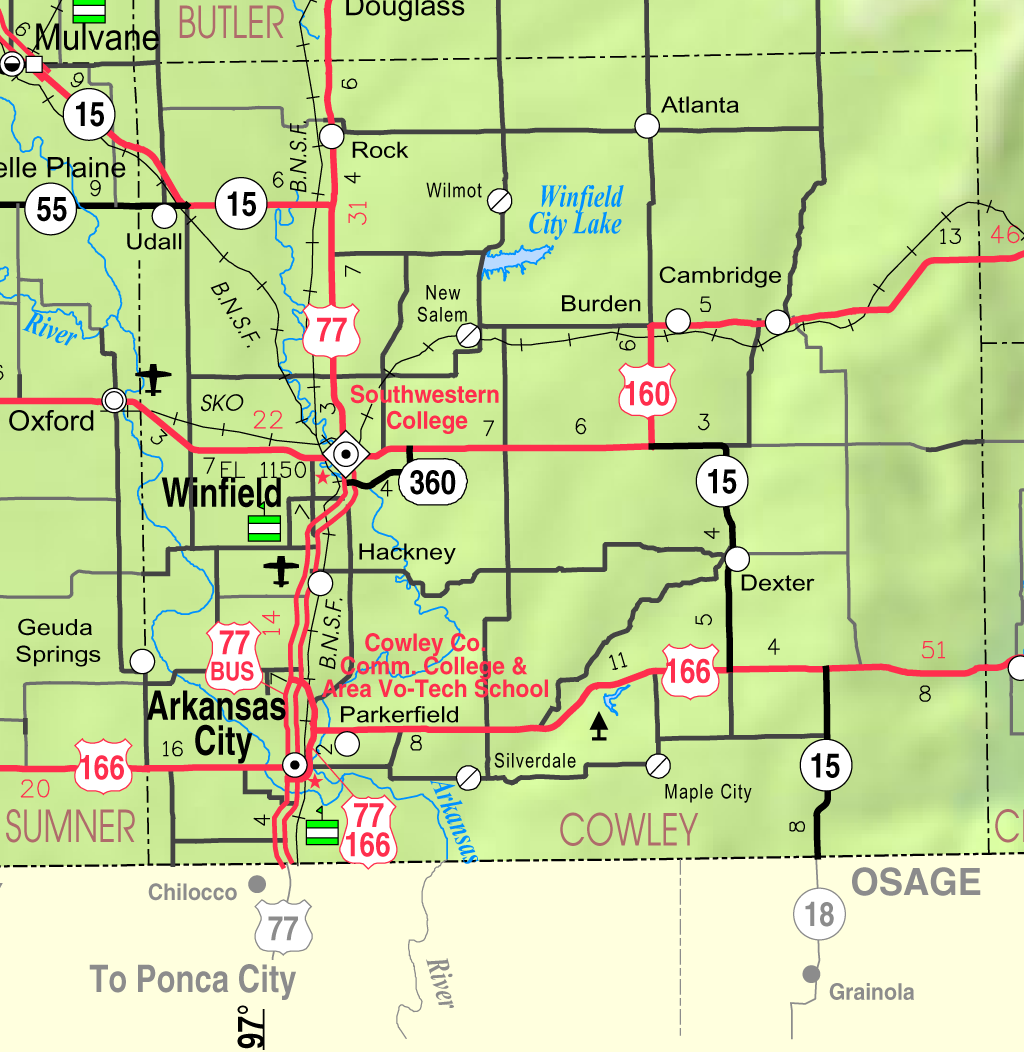
- KDOT map of Cowley County (legend)

- Location within Kansas Location within the United States
- Coordinates: 37°16′6″N 96°52′25″W
- Country: United States
- State: Kansas
- County: Cowley
- Elevation: 1,322 ft (403 m)
- Time zone: UTC-6 (CST)
  - Summer (DST): UTC-5 (CDT)
- Area code: 620
- FIPS code: 20-70700
- GNIS ID: 469566

Tisdale is an unincorporated community in Cowley County, Kansas, United States.

== History ==
The post office was established December 1, 1871, and discontinued April 15, 1920. Tisdale once had three stores and several other buildings, and did a flourishing trade with the surrounding area until the spring of 1880 when the railroad was built four miles to the north through Burden.

== Geography ==
Tisdale is a ghost town, located approximately six miles east of Winfield on US Route 160, near the Tisdale Methodist Church, and west of State Highway 15.

== Education ==
The community is served by Winfield USD 465 public school district.
