= Winfield High School (Kansas) =

Coordinates: 37.2472°N 96.9684°W

Location
- 300 Viking Blvd; Winfield, Kansas

Information
- Former name: Winfield Junior-Senior High School
- School district: Winfield USD 465
- Enrollment: 664 (2023–2024)
- Newspaper: The Oracle
- Website: winfieldhs.usd465.com

Winfield High School (WHS), previously Winfield Junior-Senior High School, is a senior high school in Winfield, Kansas. It is a part of Winfield Unified School District 465.

== History ==
The school first opened prior to the start of the 20th Century in the former Central School, which received an addition in 1880. A new building, with three stories, and having an auditorium and gymnasium, opened in 1910; this facility, made of brick, was colored red. The new building began hosting assemblies of area schools and allowed for increased programming.

In 1911 the school newspaper, The Oracle, debuted. A bond proposal for an addition known as a "manual high school" building passed in 1916. In 1951 an industrial arts building opened to the west of the 1910 facility. In 1974 a new facility opened.

== Extracurricular activities ==
The Winfield High School band appeared around 1910 and the first recording of its activities appeared in 1916; previously teenagers wanting to do band activities joined practice sessions from the junior league of the city band.

Beverley Olson Buller, who wrote the book Winfield, stated that the 1910s physical education classes "likely" resulted in the May Fete celebrations held in the mid-1910s.
