= Winfield USD 465 =

Public school district in Winfield, Kansas

Address
- 1407 Wheat Rd. Winfield, Kansas, 67156; United States
- Coordinates: 37°14′9″N 96°58′20″W

District information
- Type: Public
- Grades: PreK to 12

Other information
- Website: usd465.com

Winfield USD 465 is a public unified school district headquartered in Winfield, Kansas, United States. The district includes the communities of Winfield, Akron, Floral, Hackney, New Salem, Tisdale, and nearby rural areas.

== Schools ==
The school district operates the following schools:

Secondary:

- Winfield High School
- Winfield Middle School

Primary:

- Country View Elementary School
- Irving Elementary School
  - It was built in 1893 for Winfield's north ward. Its current building opened in 1963.
- Lowell Elementary School
  - It was built in 1893 for Winfield's south ward. Its current building opened in 1958.
- Whittier Elementary School
  - It opened in 1955 to serve areas along Mound Street.

Preschool:

- Early Learning Center

Former schools:

- Byrant Elementary School opened in 1884, serving the west ward. The Cowley County Historical Museum now uses the building.
- Stevenson Elementary School opened in 1925.
- Webster Elementary School opened in 1884, serving the east ward. In 1938 a replacement facility opened. As of 2015 the district still used the original building.

When the district first established its elementary schools, each one was intended for a particular ward and was named after a poet.

== See also ==
- Kansas State Department of Education
- Kansas State High School Activities Association
- List of high schools in Kansas
- List of unified school districts in Kansas
