= Karen Wheeler =

American artist (born 1955)

Karen Sue Wheeler
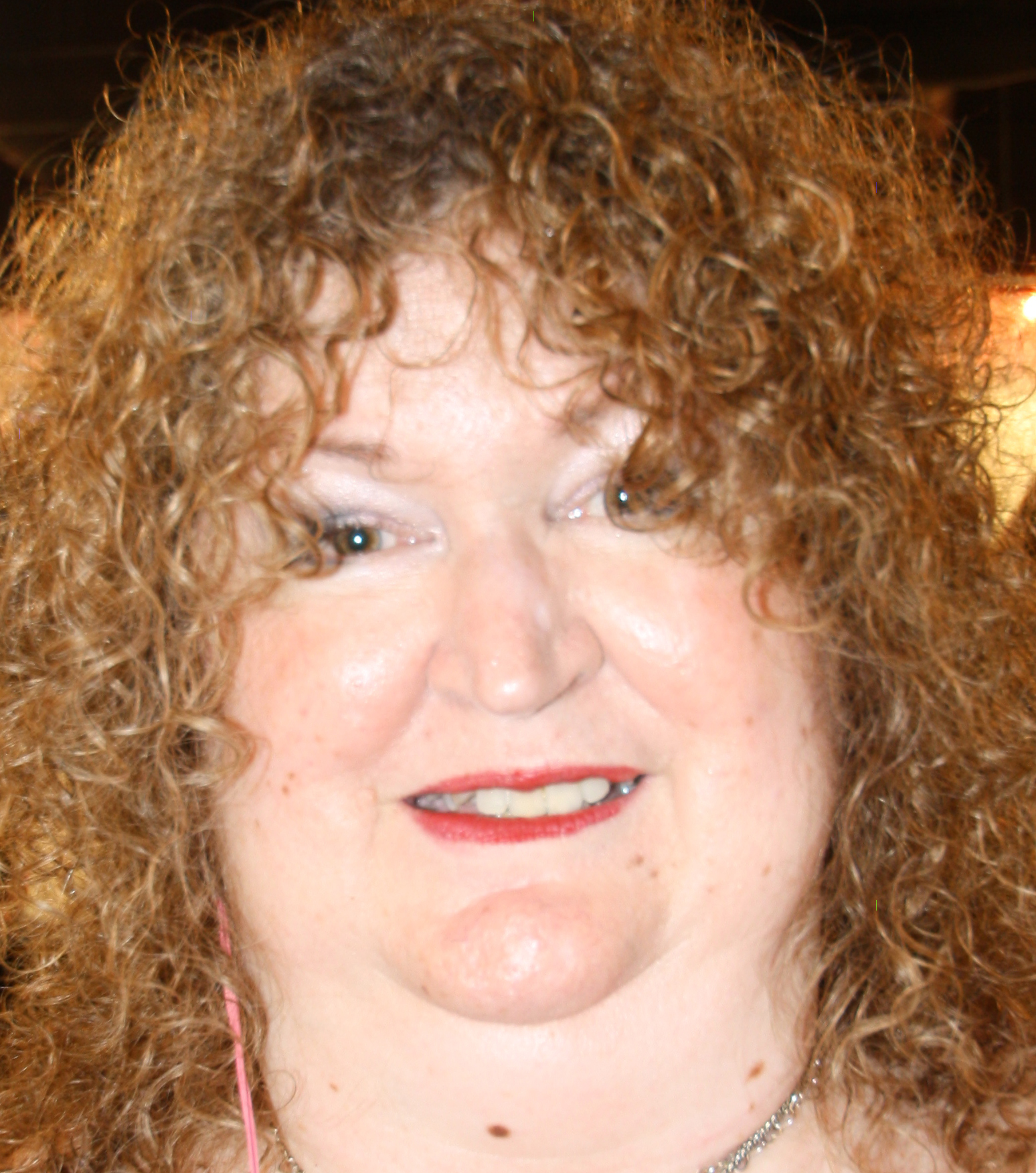
- Born: 1955 (age 70–71); Winfield, Kansas
- Occupation: Artist

Karen Sue Wheeler (born 1955 in Winfield, Kansas) is an American artist who was born with a neurodegenerative condition called spinal muscular atrophy which causes muscle wasting. She uses a technique called "layering" that resembles colored pencil. Each painting that she produces takes from 150 to 500 hours to complete.

== Childhood ==
Wheeler was born in 1955 in Winfield, Kansas, and is the middle of three children. Her parents were told she would not live beyond a year old. Wheeler says that she started creating art when she was 5, because she was unable to play outside.

== College ==
Wheeler attended Santa Ana College before transferring to California State University, Fullerton, where she received a master's degree in art in 1981 with a 4.0 grade point average.

== Career ==
Wheeler has developed a sling-like device that she wears on her arm to assist her with wielding her tools, rather a brush, pencil or pen. She uses a small brush and very little pigment that creates a dry-brush effect called "layering" that resembles colored pencil. Each painting that she produces takes from 150 to 500 hours to complete.

Wheeler served on the Board of Directors of Very Special Arts California from 1985 to 1992, and currently serves as an honorary board member. She was selected as Disabled Professional Woman of the Year by the Pilot Club of Southeast Los Angeles in 1990, and has been a board member of the (Las) Vegas Artists Guild since 2003, serving two terms as president and was the Director of Vegas Artists Guild, and in charge of Shows until September 2012.

In April 2012, Wheeler with business partner, William Schnell co-created GoHitYourself.com. They created the site to educate persons with disabilities on how to better their situations and to illuminate these situations for the able-bodied person. In 2014, Wheeler and Schnell rebranded and merged GoHitYourself.com with Wheeler's personal site where her art was profiled alongside her stories about living with a disability. The rebranded site used to be located at KarenWheeler.com.

== Works ==
Wheeler's early works are watercolor, but she has also used oil paints, acrylics, pencils and ink. Her subject matter varies but she is known to hide a rose in most of her pieces which symbolizes herself.
