= Richard W. Thorington Jr. =

American zoologist and curator

Richard Wainwright "Thor" Thorington Jr. (December 24, 1937 - February 24, 2017) was an American zoologist who made seminal contributions to mammalogy and evolutionary biology. He was known especially for his expertise on squirrels. After preparatory school at the Haverford School, he received the A.B. in biology from Princeton University in 1959 followed by the M.A. in 1963 and Ph.D. in 1964, both from Harvard University. His doctoral dissertation, supervised by Ernst Mayr, was entitled The biology of rodent tails: A Study of form and function. On completing his doctorate he took a position as primatologist with Harvard's Regional Primate Center, in which capacity he studied monkeys in Brazil, Colombia, and Panama. In 1969 he moved to the Smithsonian Institution as a curator of mammals, where he remained until his retirement in 2009. From 1987 until 1992 he served as chair of the department of vertebrate zoology.

In the late 1970s he developed Charcot-Marie-Tooth syndrome, which ultimately left him a quadriplegic. As a result, he shifted his research to squirrels. He carried out field research in North America, India, and Southeast Asia. As his mobility deteriorated he shifted his focus to museum studies of systematics and anatomy, using the Smithsonian's collection of over 30,000 specimens of squirrels. In addition to numerous technical publications, he co-authored the book Squirrels of the World, a profusely illustrated, encyclopedic treatment of all 285 known species of squirrel.

Thorington was a member of the American Society of Mammalogists. The oldest known fossil squirrel species, Hesperopetes thoringtoni, is named in his honor.

== Personal life ==
Thorington was born on December 24, 1937, in Philadelphia, Pennsylvania to Katherine Louise Moffat Thorington and Richard Wainwright Thorington Sr. In 1967, he married Caroline "Carey" Miller, an artist. They had two daughters, Ellen and Katherine, also a biologist. He died on February 24, 2017, at the age of 79 in Bethesda, Maryland of a blood infection.
