= Ruth Maycliffe =

American actress (1888–1981)

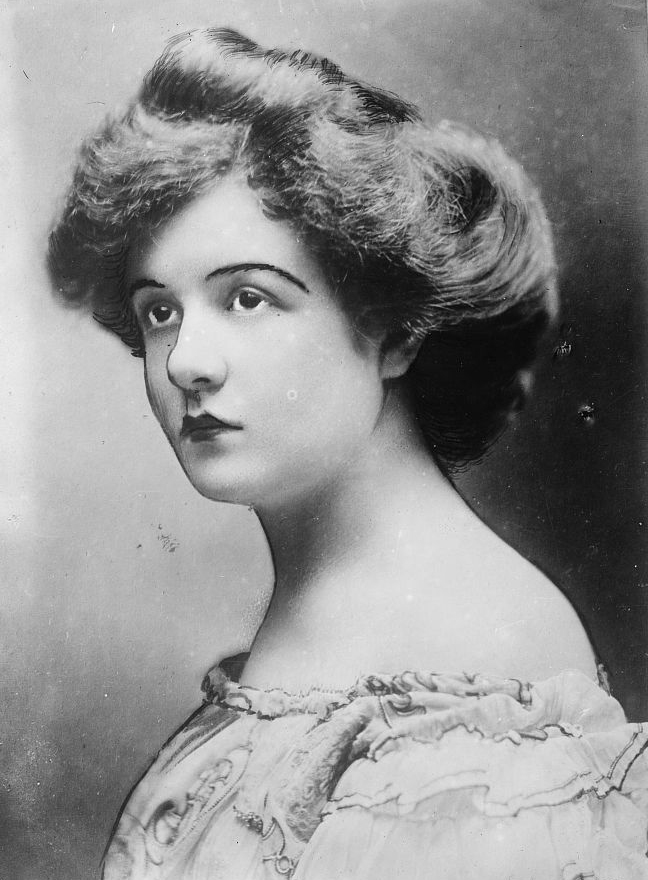
- Ruth Maycliffe circa 1910
- Born: Fern Krehbiel; December 19, 1888; Winfield, Kansas, U.S.
- Died: November 9, 1981 (aged 92); San Francisco, California, U.S.
- Resting place: Union Cemetery, Winfield
- Occupation: Actress
- Spouses: J. Braganza d'Avellar; Georges Benetau Dubuat

Ruth Maycliffe (born Fern Krehbiel; 1888–1981) was an American actress who rose to fame when she made her Broadway debut in the Clyde Fitch comedy, Girls, in 1908. She made national headlines again when she reportedly married a prince in 1913 and a count in 1919.

== Biography ==
Fern Krehbiel (sometimes spelled Kraybill) was born near Winfield, Kansas, on December 19, 1888, the daughter of Reuben and Luella (Roberts) Krehbiel. Her mother, Luella Krehbiel, was a Socialist Party organizer who traveled the country giving speeches. Fern grew up in Winfield and Coffeyville. When she was sixteen, she moved with her mother to Kansas City, where she attended a drama school and acted with the Woodward Stock Company in Omaha and Kansas City.

=== Broadway career ===
In the fall of 1907, she moved to New York and obtained a part in the Clyde Fitch vaudeville comedy, Miss McCobb, Manicuriste. It was there that she was "discovered" by Fitch, who was reportedly so taken with her performance that he wrote a character into his next play, Girls, especially for her. She made her Broadway debut in Girls the following year, and immediately became "one of the most popular ingénue actresses that ever stepped upon a Broadway stage."

Maycliffe starred opposite Charles Cherry in Fitch's The Bachelor in 1909, and Edward Peple's The Spitfire in 1910. In 1912 she starred in George M. Cohan's Officer 666, which was later made into a silent film. Soon afterwards she married and retired from acting, returning to the stage one last time in 1917 to star in Saturday to Monday, a satire of the women's suffrage movement. A reviewer in Life magazine wrote at the time, "After a considerable absence from the New York stage Miss Ruth Maycliffe returns to display an unexpected versatility of a young person considerably more attractive than those usual to Suffrage ranks, who is strong in her convictions and actions at first, but later shows herself a womanly woman of the right sort."

=== Personal life ===
Newspapers and magazines printed many conflicting and sensational stories about Maycliffe. When the Washington Post described her as an accomplished horsewoman who could rope a steer in record time, President Theodore Roosevelt was reportedly so impressed that he summoned her to the White House for a meeting. In 1914 she made national headlines when she disembarked from an ocean liner, the Laconia, claiming that she had married a Portuguese nobleman and was now the Princess Braganza d'Avellar. Some sources reported that she had grown up on a cattle ranch in Mexico, claims which were refuted by her hometown newspaper. According to one widely circulated news story, Maycliffe had been married only a short time when the prince was killed in a revolutionary battle in Portugal, leaving her a widow.

In 1919 she met Georges Benetau du Buat (1894–1973), a French officer who was doing engineering work at Fort Dix, and married him. It was only when she accompanied him to France to meet his family, and was greeted as the "Countess du Buat", that she learned he was a count. The couple moved to Paris in 1920, then to a village in Brittany in 1937. After World War II they returned to the United States, where her husband worked as an electrical engineer for the Pacific Gas and Electric Company. They moved to Italy in 1969. Her husband died in 1973 and is buried in Bordighera. Maycliffe, then known as the Countess Fern du Buat, died in San Francisco on November 9, 1981. She is buried in the Union Cemetery in Winfield.

== Image gallery ==
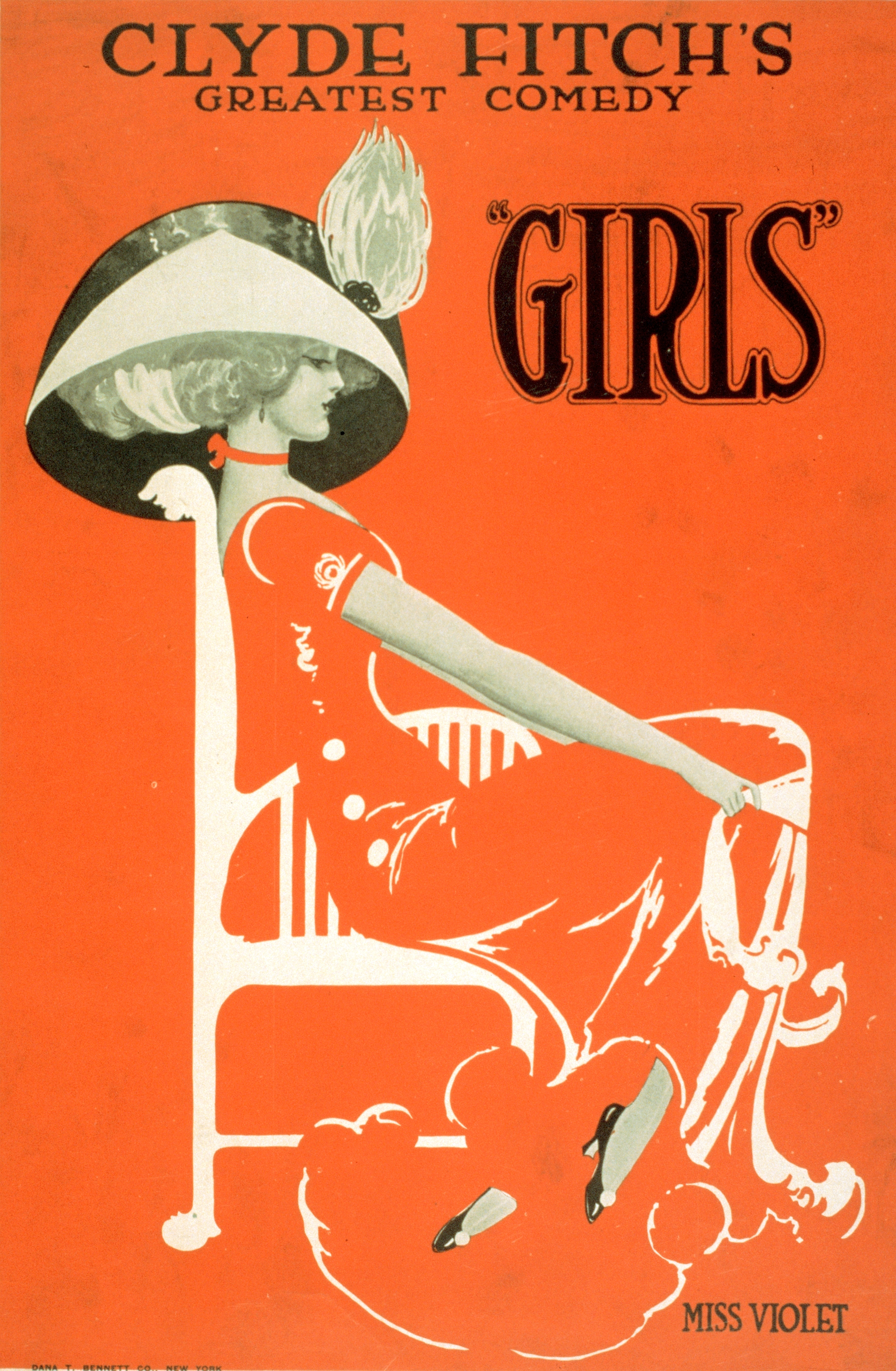
Poster for the Clyde Fitch comedy Girls, featuring Maycliffe's character, Violet.

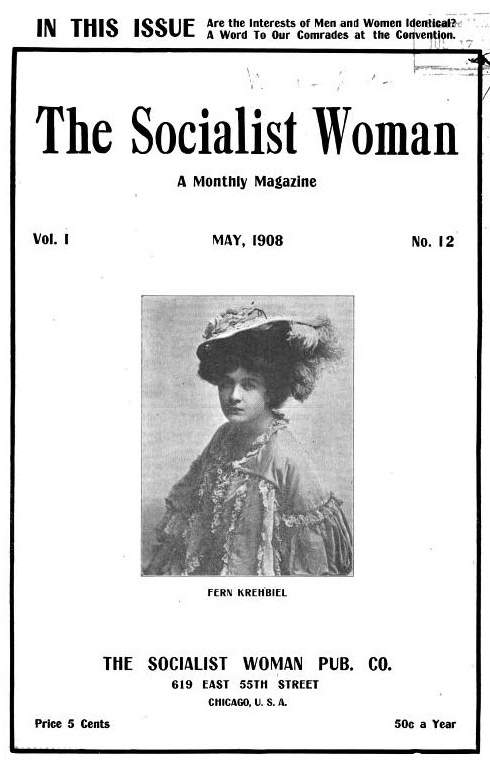
Maycliffe on the cover of The Socialist Woman, 1908.

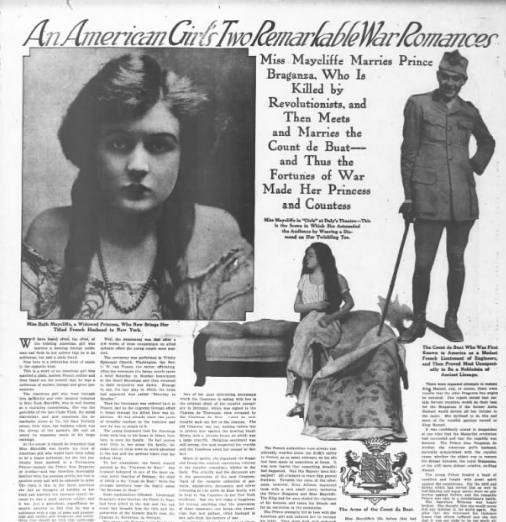
Ruth Maycliffe in the Washington Times, May 18, 1919.
