= Caroline Thorington =

Print maker specializing in lithography

Caroline Thorington is a print maker specializing in lithography. She was born in Winfield, Kansas on March 2, 1943 to Frank and Ellen Miller. She received a B.A. from Kansas State University in 1965 and spent the following year on a fellowship at the Academy of Fine Arts in Munich, Germany, where she learned print making. In 1967 she married zoologist Richard W. Thorington Jr. When he became curator of mammals at the Smithsonian Institution in 1969, she moved with him to the Washington, D.C. area where she has made her home ever since. In 1975 she received a Master of Fine Arts from George Washington University.

She taught printmaking and drawing at Montgomery College from 1975 to 2001. She has exhibited widely. She received the Muskat Studios Prize at the Boston Printmakers Biennial Exhibition in 2017. Her print Covid Feat was featured in the Washington Post.

Thorington is also known as a competitive adult figure skater. She was still skating competitively in 2024.

She was widowed in 2017. She has two daughters, Ellen and Katherine.
