= GWR petrol-electric railcar =

GWR railcar introduced in 1911

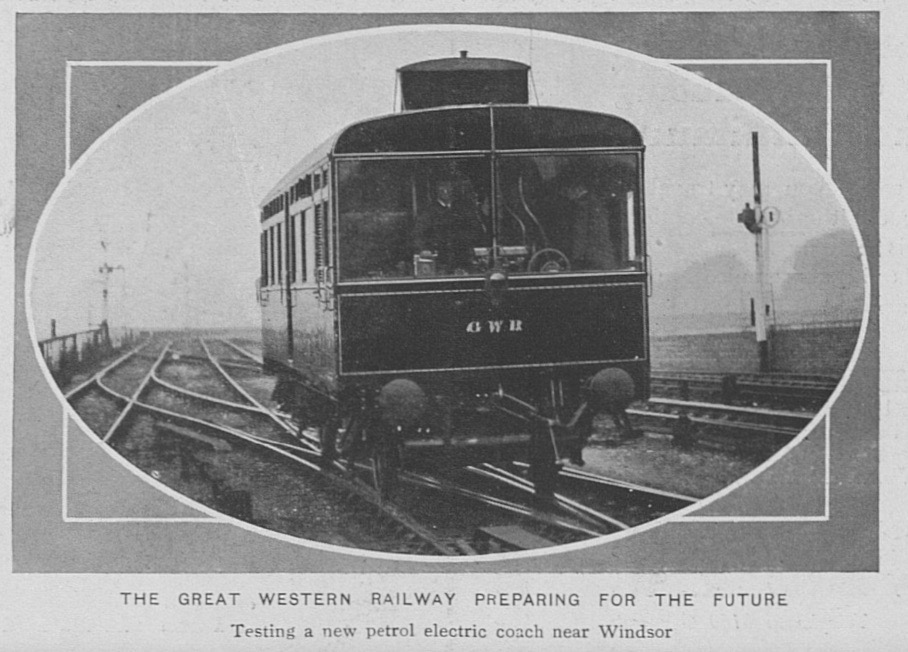
- From The Sphere, Saturday 9 March 1912
- In service: 1912-1923
- Manufacturer: British Thomson-Houston
- Designer: British Thomson-Houston
- Assembly: Rugby, Warwickshire
- Fleet numbers: 100
- Capacity: 44
- Operators: GWR; Lever Brothers

Specifications
- Maximum speed: Almost 35 mph (56 km/h)
- Weight: 14 long tons (14 metric tons)
- Axle load: 7 long tons (7.1 metric tons)
- Engine type: Maudslay petrol
- Cylinder count: 4
- Cylinder size: 5 by 5 inches (130 mm × 130 mm)
- Power output: 35–45 horsepower (26–34 kW)
- UIC classification: Bo
- Seating: 44 passengers
- Track gauge: 4 ft 8 1/2 in (1,435 mm) standard gauge

The GWR petrol-electric railcar was a 4-wheel motorised coach ordered by the GWR in 1911 from British Thomson-Houston, who designed it and supplied the electrical fittings. It was powered by a 35–45 horsepower (26–34 kW) Maudslay petrol engine driving a dynamo which supplied two electric motors, one on each axle. It was provided with a driving position at both ends, and could carry 44 passengers at over 30 mph (48 km/h). It was numbered 100.

The first journey undertaken was on 28 January 1912 when the railcar ran from Leamington to Slough. It was then put through a series of tests on the line between Slough and Windsor.

It was in use on the GWR until October 1919, when it was sold to Lever Brothers, who ran it at Port Sunlight until 1923.
