= Richard Mawdsley =

American artist (born 1945)

Richard Willis Mawdsley
- Born: 1945 (age 80–81); Winfield, Kansas, U.S.

Richard Mawdsley (born 1945) is an American artist known for his work in metalsmithing, particularly narrative sculptures and vessels made of precious metal tubing, cogs, gears, and mechanical components.

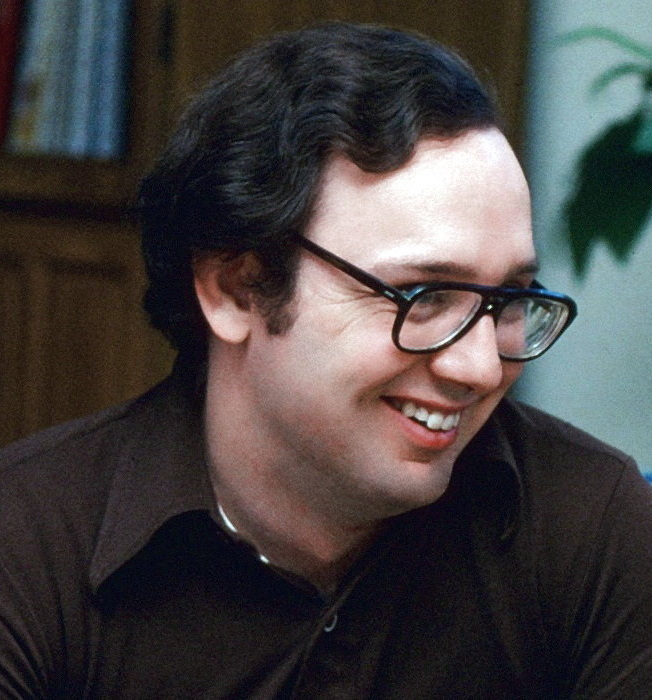

== Early years ==
Richard Mawdsley was born in 1945 at Winfield, Kansas. He attended Emporia State University from 1963 to 1967, majoring in Art under instructors Don Hazelrigg and Ron Hickman. He stumbled upon metalsmithing accidentally as he could not get into a printmaking class and opted to take metals instead. After this introduction, Mawdsley majored in metals and began to make works inspired by Pop art.

Upon graduation, he entered the University of Kansas and studied Jewelry and Silversmithing from 1967 to 1969 as a graduate student under the tutelage of Carlyle Smith.

== Teaching career ==
After obtaining his MFA, Mawdsley taught at Illinois State University from 1969 to 1978. He then joined the faculty of Southern Illinois University Carbondale in 1978 and taught there for the rest of his teaching career, retiring in 2004 after teaching for 36 years at the university level.

== Artwork ==
Mawdsley's artwork has been exhibited extensively since the 1960s, including many exhibitions in over a dozen countries in Europe, Australia, and Asia. His work has been collected by several major museums, including the Renwick Gallery of the Smithsonian Institution, the Yale University Art Gallery, the Museum of Fine Arts in Boston, and the Museum of Fine Arts in Houston.

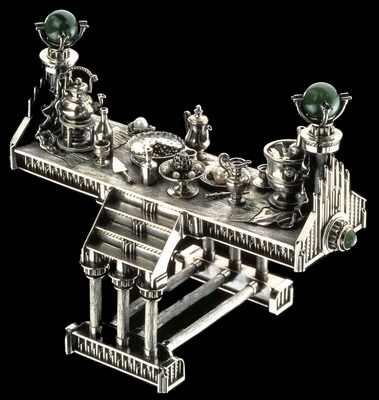
FEAST BRACELET Renwick Gallery Included in 175th Anniversary Smithsonian Traveling Exhibition

== Awards ==
Mawdsley has been awarded two National Endowment for the Arts Artist Fellowships and three Illinois Arts Council Fellowships. Other honors given to Mawdsley include the arts award from the Honor Society of Phi Kappa Phi, North Central Regional for the 2001-2004 Triennium; Outstanding Scholar Award for 2003 from SIUC's College of Liberal Arts; elected to the American Craft Council's College of Fellows in 1998; and the Distinguished Alumnus Award from Emporia State University, Kansas, in 1993.
