= The Cowley Courier Traveler =

Newspaper in Arkansas City, Kansas

- Type: Daily newspaper
- Owner(s): Winfield Publishing Company
- Founder(s): M. G. Mains
- Publisher: David Allen Seaton
- Founded: 1870 (As The Arkansas City Traveler)
- Language: English
- Headquarters: 200 E 5th Avenue; Arkansas City, Kansas
- Circulation: 3,561
- ISSN: 2473-8107
- OCLC number: 953100866
- Website: ctnewsonline.com

The Cowley Courier Traveler is a local newspaper published in Arkansas City, Kansas, United States. It covers communities across Cowley County and is publishes a print edition mailed to readers on Tuesdays, Thursdays and Saturdays. The paper was formed in 2016 through the merger of The Winfield Daily Courier and The Arkansas City Traveler. The Cowley Courier Traveler is a member of the Kansas Press Association.

== History ==
Windfield Courier masthead, cirxa 2014

The Arkansas City Traveler was founded in 1870 by M. G. Mains. It was named after a song of the same name and early issues had a fiddle below the masthead. The newspaper was sold to Stauffer Communications in 1924, which was acquired by Morris Communications in 1995. Morris sold the paper to Winfield Publishing Company in 2001.

The Winfield Courier was first published in Jan. 1, 1874 by Col. E.C. Manning. It was renamed to The Winfield Daily Courier in 1884. The paper's owner bought The Arkansas City Traveler in 2001and merged the two together in 2016 to form The Cowley Courier Traveler.

== See also ==
- List of newspapers in Kansas
