= Reginald Walter Maudslay =

Reginald Walter Maudslay (1 September 1871 – 14 December 1934) was a British car manufacturer and founder of the Standard Motor Company. Born in Paddington, London, Maudslay was the son of Athol Edward Maudslay, "gentleman", and Kate, daughter of Sir Thomas Lucas, founder of a large firm of building contractors.

Maudslay was educated at St David's School in Moffat, Scotland, followed by Marlborough College. After leaving school he attended the Crystal Palace School of Engineering, trained as a civil engineer under Sir John Wolfe-Barry, during which time he worked on a number of major engineering projects such as Barry Docks. Maudslay abandoned his civil engineering career in 1902 and with financial support from Wolfe-Barry moved to Coventry, where he leased a small workshop; his cousin, Cyril Maudslay, was by then managing director of the nearby Maudslay Motor Company. In 1903 Reginald Maudslay established the Standard Motor Company in larger premises in Much Park Street. Unable to use the family name to brand his vehicles, Maudslay appears to have been influenced in his adoption of the "Standard" marque by the Roman standard on display in the lounge of his house.

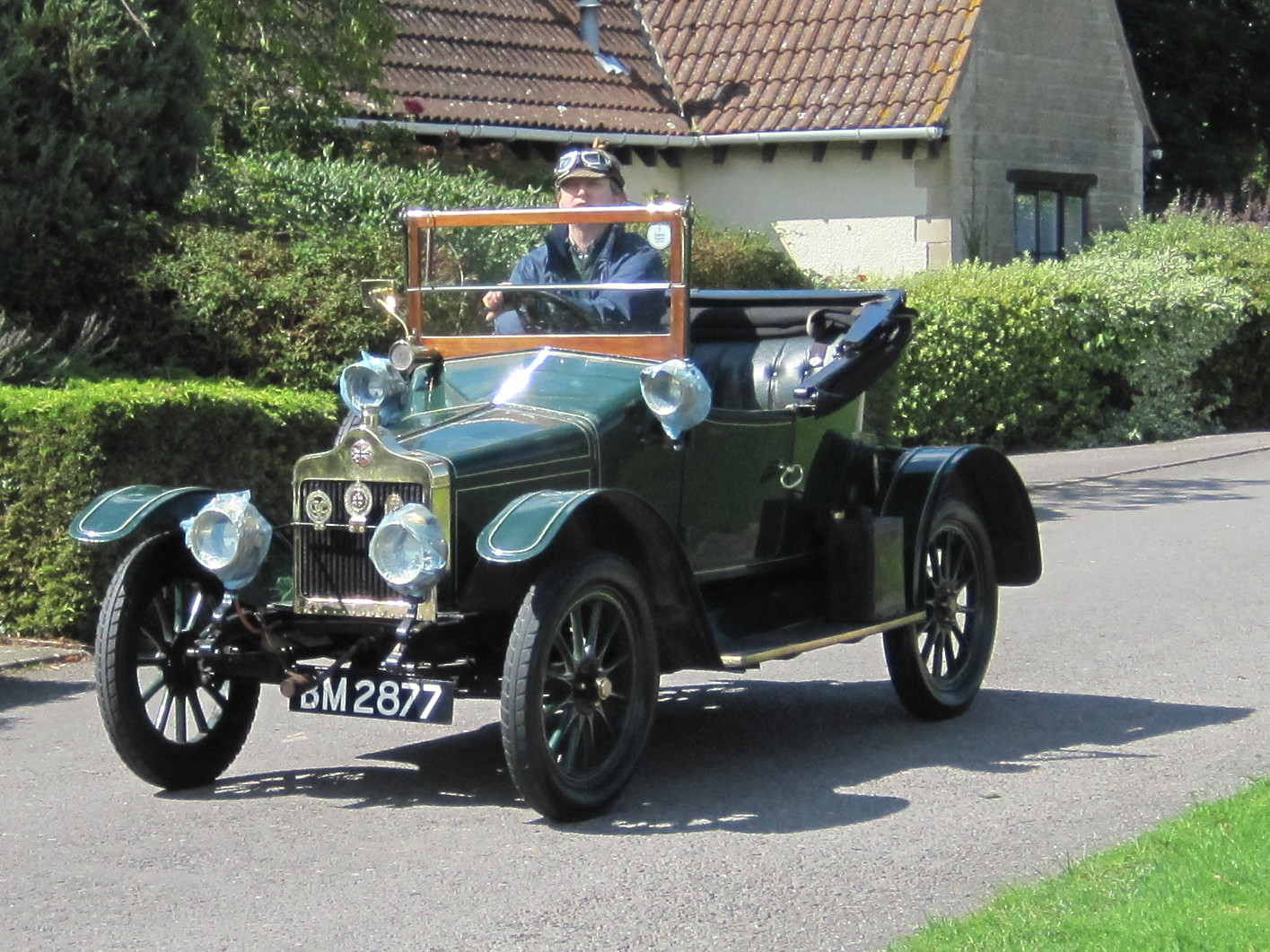
1913 Model S 2-seater tourer

In 1914 the Standard Motor Company went public, for a "comparatively modest" £50,000 (equivalent to £6.18 million in 2024 (Note: United Kingdom Gross Domestic Product deflator figures follow the MeasuringWorth "consistent series" supplied in Thomas, Ryland; Williamson, Samuel H. (2026), "What Was the U.K. GDP Then?", MeasuringWorth)). Production was increased and soon reached 750 cars per year. Maudslay was reported to be a designer of "considerable ability", and reputedly invented the side-entrance car body so familiar today, but his contribution to the development of Standard after the First World War is "difficult to assess". He relied heavily on the engineering skills of others such as John Budge and later John Black, who by 1933 was joint managing director with Maudslay. Maudslay's enthusiasm for the export market drove the company's finances into the doldrums during the 1920s, particularly in 1927 after an anticipated large Australian order, to which most of the company's production had been diverted, failed to materialise.

Maudslay married Susan Gwendolen, née Herbert, on 30 January 1908; the couple had two sons and a daughter. One of the sons, Henry, flew with the Royal Air Force in World War II, and was killed on the famous Dam Busters' Raid in May 1943.

Little is known of his private life, but "he acquired the reputation of a country gentleman and was fond of inspecting the shop floor wearing a deerstalker hat and matching overcoat." Contemporaries described him as "a gentlemanly engineer of the old school who found it difficult to adjust his ideas to the post-1918 industry". He died in Marylebone, London, on 14 December 1934 after a short illness.
