= Maudslay Motor Company =

British automobile manufacturer

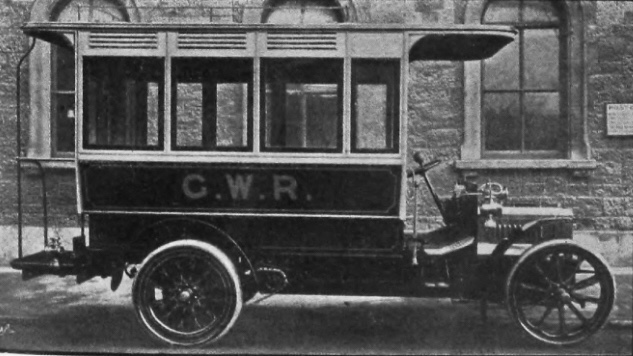
Maudslay bus (1905)

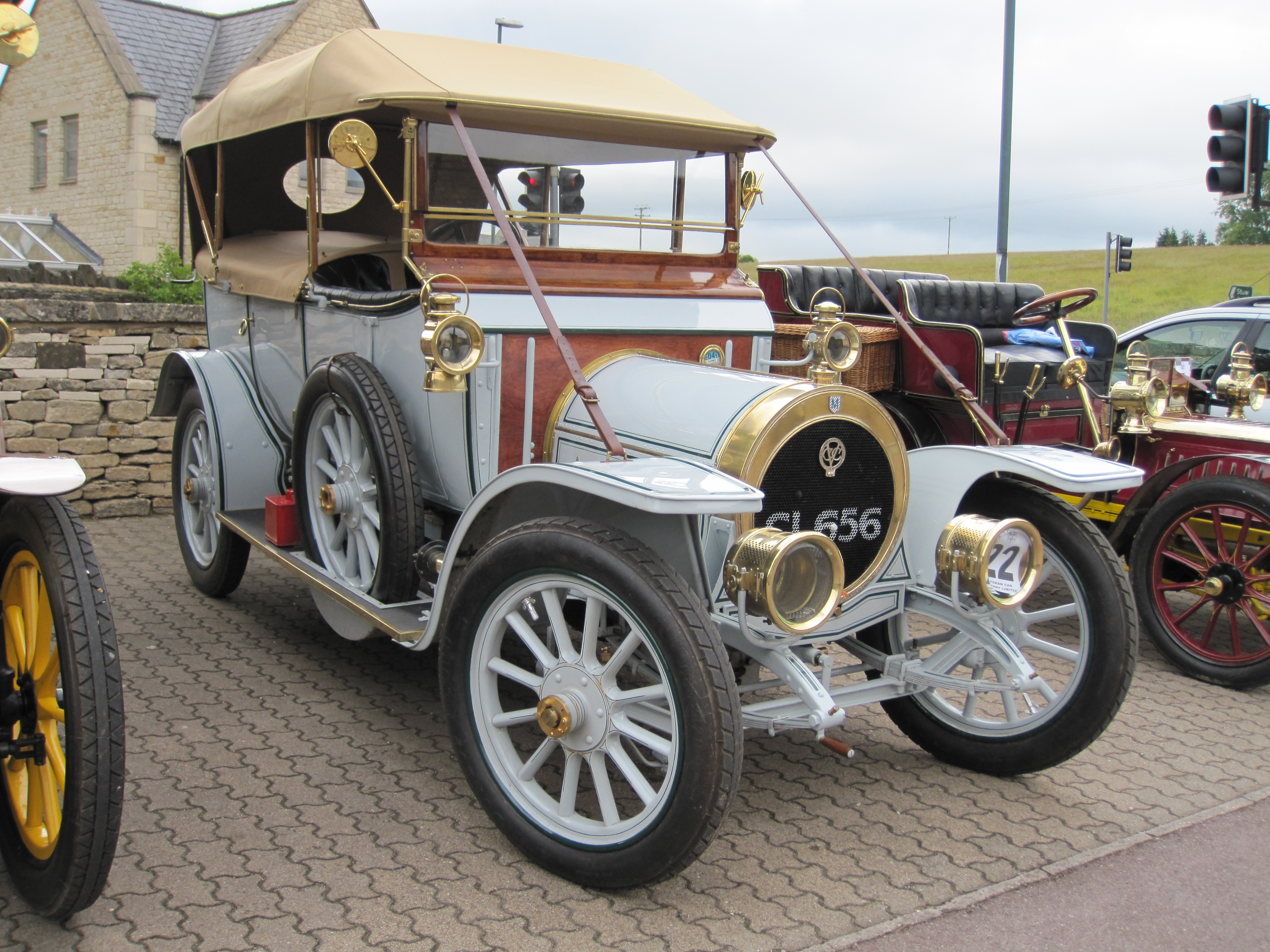
1910 Maudslay 17hp Tourer

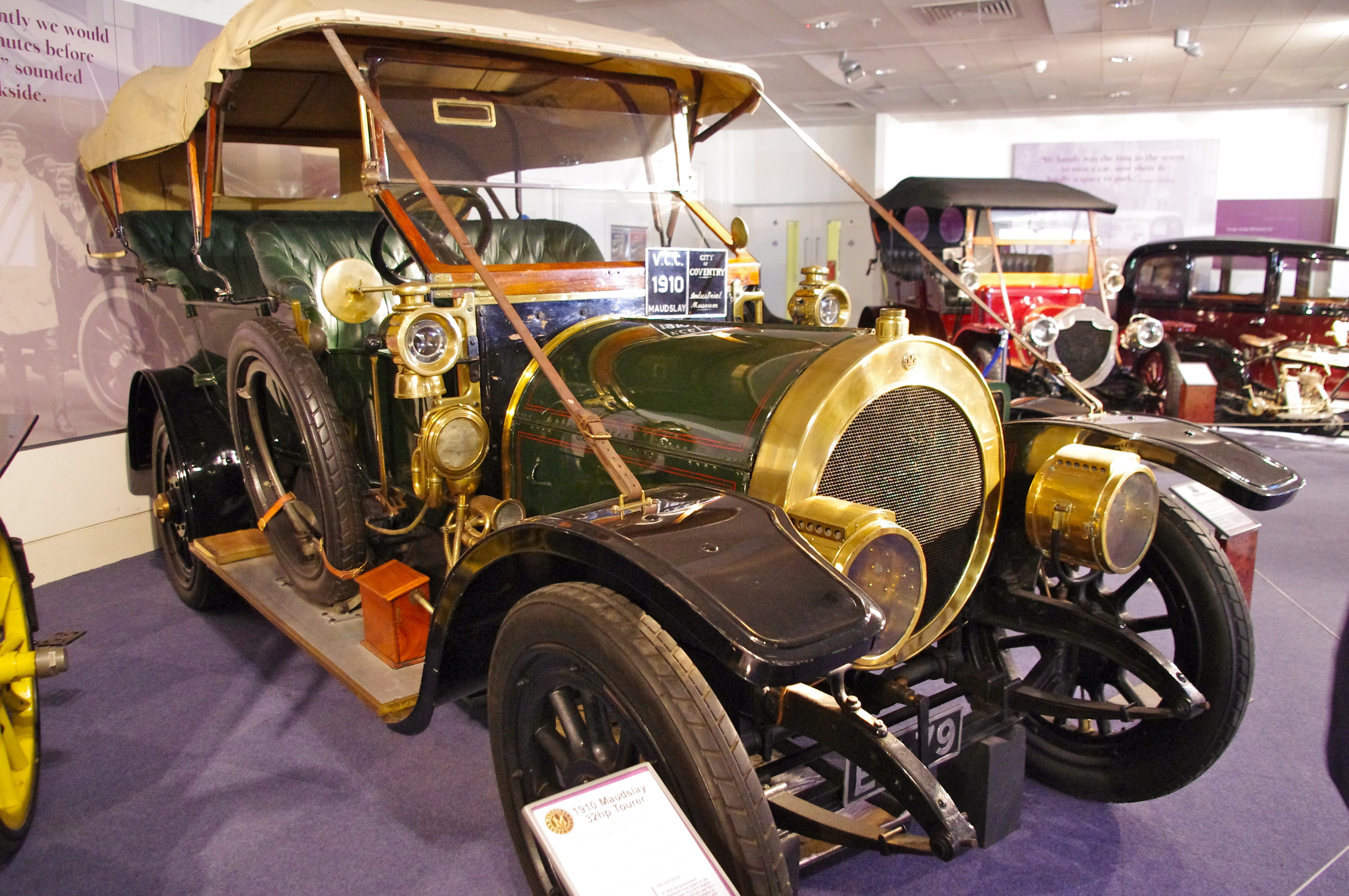
1910 Maudslay 32hp Tourer at Coventry Transport Museum

The Maudslay Motor Company was a British vehicle maker based in Coventry. It was founded in 1901 and continued until 1948 when it was taken over by the Associated Equipment Company (AEC) and along with Crossley Motors the new group was renamed Associated Commercial Vehicles (ACV) Ltd.

== Early history ==
The Maudslay Motor Company was founded in 1901 by Walter Henry Maudslay, grandson of the eminent engineer Henry Maudslay to make marine internal combustion engines at a factory in Parkside, Coventry. He was joined by his son Cyril Charles Maudslay and his nephew Reginald Walter Maudslay, who left in 1903 to found the Standard Motor Company.

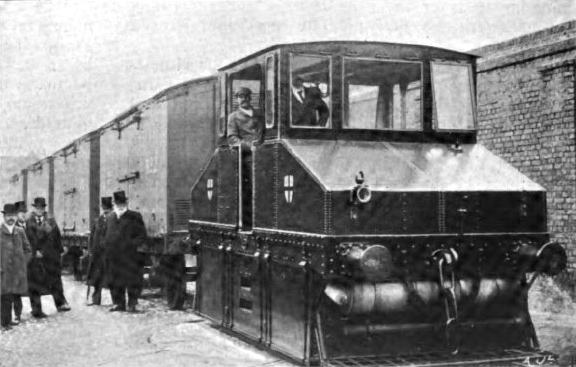
1902 Maudslay Petrol Locomotive

The marine engines did not sell very well, and in 1902 they made their first engine intended for a car which was fitted to chain-drive chassis. The three-cylinder engine, designed by Alexander Craig, was an advanced unit with a single overhead camshaft and pressure lubrication. Also In 1902, Maudslay Motors made a petrol railway locomotive for the City of London Corporation to draw trucks from the London, Brighton and South Coast Railway to the Corporation meat market at Deptford, this requiring 50 tons to be drawn up a gradient of 1 in 36. It was fitted with a three-cylinder engine developing 85 bhp at 450 rpm, with cylinders of 9inch bore and stroke. Transmission was via a 2-speed change gear. The locomotive weighed 12 tons, and was provided with an 8 hp auxiliary engine which was used to start the main engine. This was the first commercially successful petrol locomotive in the world.

The three-cylinder engine was followed in 1903 by a six-cylinder version, possibly the first overhead-camshaft six to go into production. For 1904 a range of cars was on offer from 25hp to 60hp, including one with a 9.6-litre version of the six-cylinder engine. The cars were among the most expensive on the British market, with the range and engine types continuing to evolve during this time.

In addition to cars, the company expanded into manufacture of commercial vehicles, ranging from small two-cylinder delivery vans to six ton lorries. The first Maudslay double decker buses were produced in 1905, being used by Scottish Motor Traction and the London Road Car Company. The Great Western Railway operated Maudslay buses and lorries in this period. In 1912 Maudslay supplied a 40 hp (30 kW) engine to power an early petrol-electric railcar.

== World War I ==
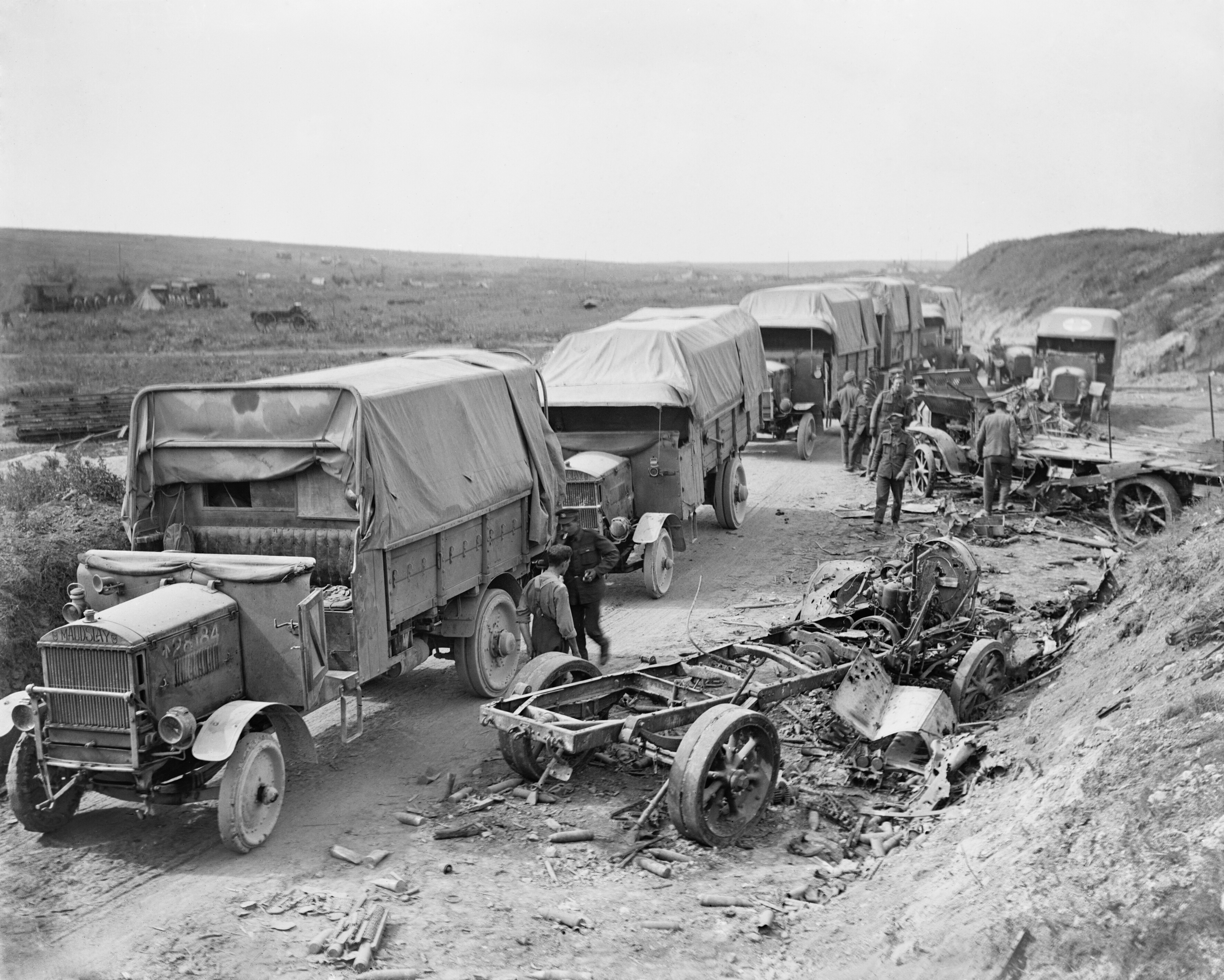
British Maudslay 3-ton lorries parked up alongside the wreckage of German motor transport destroyed by shell fire during Third Army's attack on Quéant, 2 September 1918

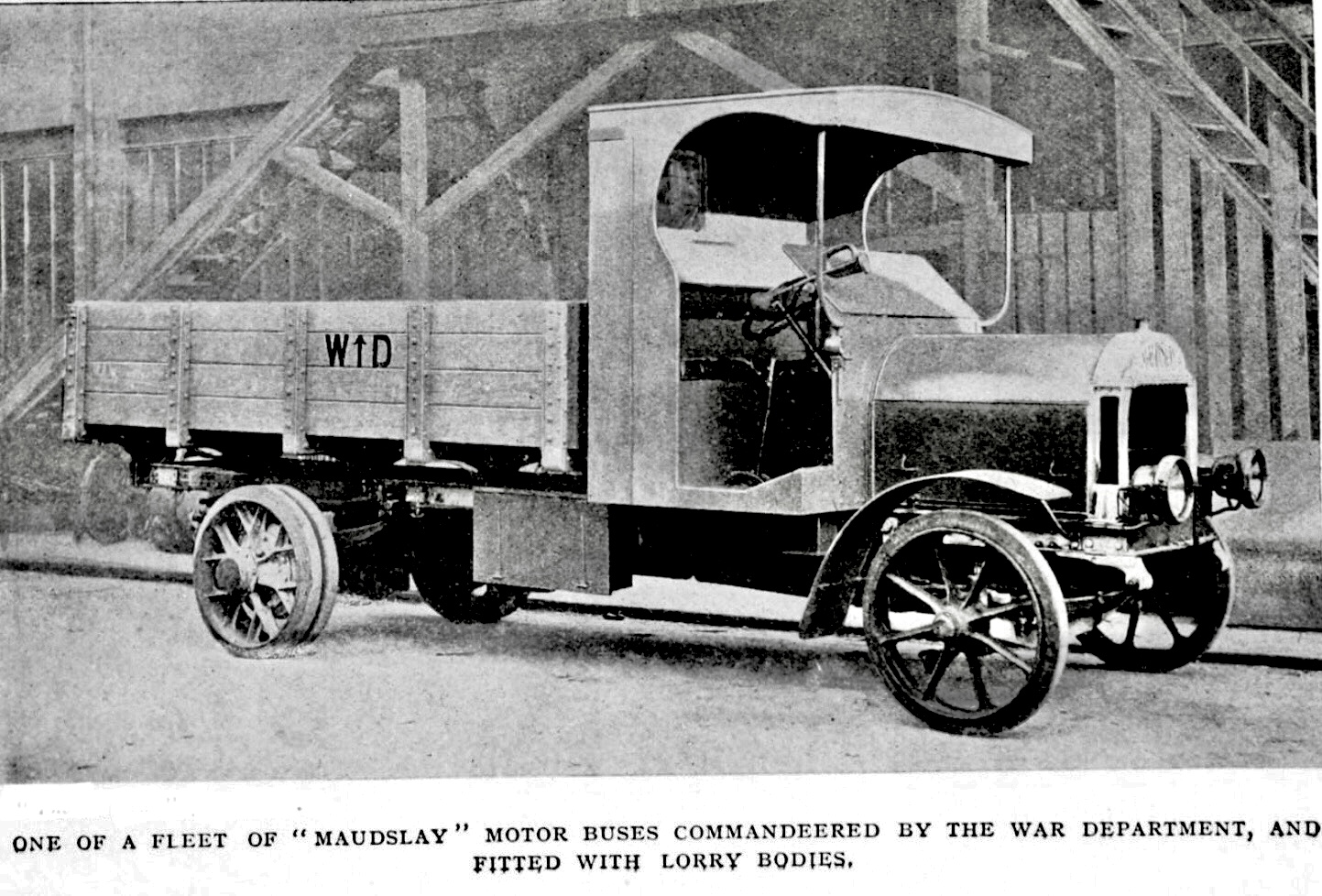
Maudslay Lorry (1914).

Private car production stopped with the outbreak of war. Five- and six-ton "A Type" lorries had been supplied to the British War Office in 1913, and these, along with a three-ton model, became the main product during hostilities. In addition, aircraft undercarriages were made, as well as reconditioning work carried out on radial engines. Production of complete engines was started in 1918, but the contract was cut short by the Armistice.

== Inter-War Years ==
Despite the advent of peace in 1918, private car building was not resumed, apart from a solitary example of an advanced sports car, shown at the 1923 London Motor Show. A new forward control chassis (designated as "CP") was launched in 1923, being used for lorries and buses, with various other models being introduced over the following years. Despite this, sales gradually fell during the 1930s, with total sales of only 21 chassis in 1937. By 1939 a total of just over 2,000 Maudslay commercial vehicles had been manufactured. In 1920, 3, 4, and 5 ton trucks were produced.

== World War II and after ==
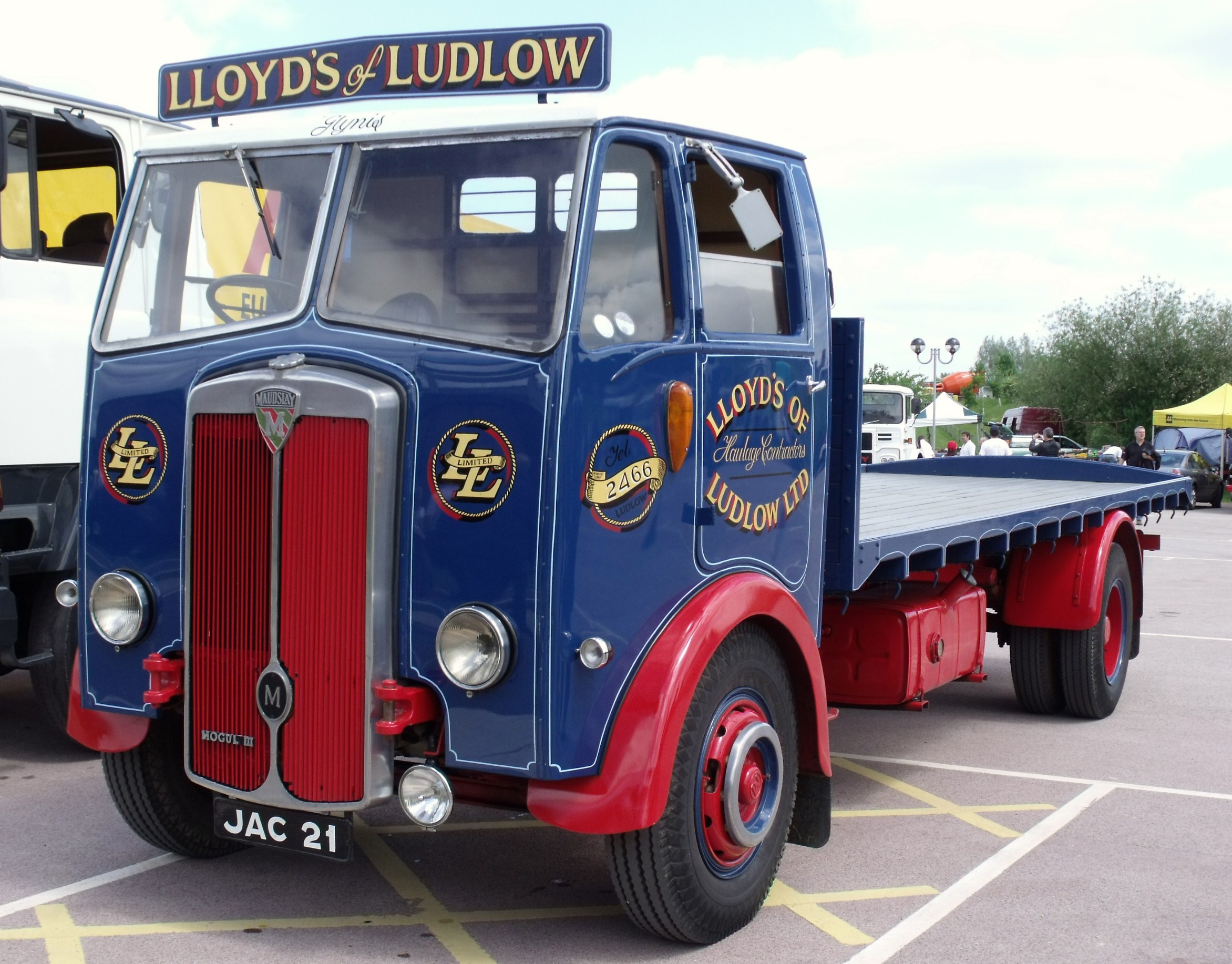
Preserved 1948 Maudslay Mogul III

All civilian vehicle production stopped in 1939, and the company turned out general service vehicles, tank and aircraft components. In 1941, virtually all production was transferred to a new works at Great Alne, near Alcester to escape air raids.

However, some production remained in Coventry, and when the factory was bombed in the Coventry Blitz several people were killed there.

The Great Alne works would be known as Castle Maudslay. Automotive production remained at this site for many years. During the 1990s brakes and axles for automotive manufactures like Volvo and Renault heavy vehicles were produced there, and ArvinMeritor, the company that once owned the Castle Maudslay site, maintained a small office and manufacturing facility there until the site was eventually demolished and became 'Great Alne Park', a retirement housing development, in 2017.

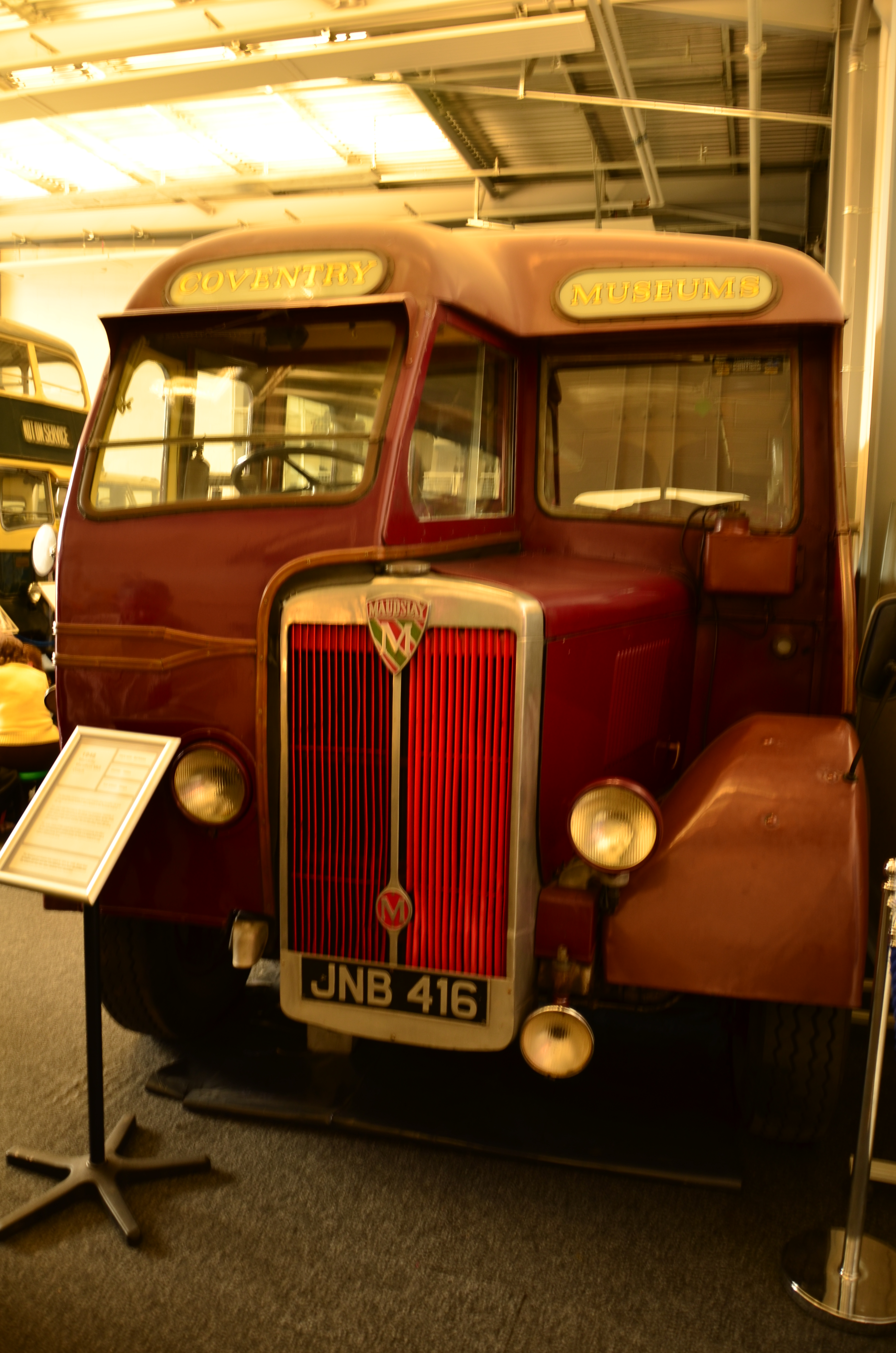
1948 Maudslay Marathon II Trans-United coach at Coventry Transport Museum

A completely new range of heavy vehicles with 4, 6 and 8 wheel chassis as well as luxury coaches was introduced. Castle Maudslay at Alcester would make components, and these would be taken to the Parkside, Coventry works for vehicle assembly.

== Merger ==
In 1948, Maudslay joined AEC and Crossley in the new Associated Commercial Vehicles (ACV) Ltd. The name was kept on at first, but in 1950 it was phased out. The Maudslay plants continued to assemble AEC-designed models in the 1950s and there were some badge-engineered Maudslays to give AEC extra space at Motor Shows. After the formation of Leyland Motor Corporation the Castle Maudslay plant produced axles; Rockwell bought it in the late 1970s.

In 1942, three of Henry Maudslay's grandsons commemorated their grandfather's name by forming the Maudslay Society, an organisation to encourage young engineers.

== See also ==
- List of car manufacturers of the United Kingdom
