= 2024 Kansas House of Representatives election =

- November 5, 2024

All 125 seats in the Kansas House of Representatives 63 seats needed for a majority
	Majority party	Minority party
Leader	Daniel Hawkins	Vic Miller (retired)
Party	Republican	Democratic
Leader's seat	100th district	58th district
Seats before	85	40
Seats won	88	37
Seat change	▲3	▼3
- Republican gain Republican hold Democratic hold 50–60% 60–70% 70–80% 80–90% >90% 50–60% 60–70% 70–80% >90%
Speaker before election
Daniel Hawkins
Republican
Elected Speaker
Daniel Hawkins
Republican

The 2024 Kansas House of Representatives election was held on November 5, 2024, alongside the 2024 United States elections. All 125 seats in the Kansas House of Representatives were up for election.

== Retirements ==
Twenty incumbents retired.

=== Democrats ===
1. District 10: Christina Haswood retired to run for State Senate.
2. District 46: Dennis Highberger retired.
3. District 58: Vic Miller retired to run for State Senate.

=== Republicans ===
1. District 1: Michael Houser retired.
2. District 4: Trevor Jacobs retired.
3. District 26: Adam Thomas retired to run for State Senate.
4. District 51: Kenny Titus retired to run for State Senate.
5. District 62: Randy Garber retired.
6. District 63: John Eplee retired to run for State Senate.
7. District 67: Mike Dodson retired.
8. District 73: Lori Shultz retired.
9. District 74: Stephen Owens retired to run for State Senate.
10. District 76: Eric Smith retired.
11. District 90: Carl Maughan retired.
12. District 105: Brenda Landwehr retired.
13. District 107: Susan Concannon retired.
14. District 112: Tory Marie Arnberger retired to run for State Senate.
15. District 114: Michael Murphy retired to run for State Senate.
16. District 122: Bill Clifford retired to run for State Senate.
17. District 124: David Younger retired.

== Incumbents defeated ==
=== In primary election ===
Two incumbent representatives, one Democrat and one Republican, were defeated in the August 6 primary election.

==== Democrats ====
1. District 35: Marvin Robinson lost renomination to Wanda Paige. Robinson subsequently died on August 23.

==== Republicans ====
1. District 65: Jeff Underhill lost renomination to Shawn Chauncey.

== Predictions ==
Source	Ranking	As of
Sabato's Crystal Ball	Likely R	October 23, 2024

== Close races ==
Districts where the margin of victory was under 10%:

1. District 28, 1.18%
2. District 49, 1.18%
3. District 15, 1.36% (flip)
4. District 88, 2.12%
5. District 14, 2.64% (flip)
6. District 39, 3.16%
7. District 102, 4.06% (flip)
8. District 67, 4.86%
9. District 41, 5.1%
10. District 30, 5.2%
11. District 48, 5.76%
12. District 53, 7.49%
13. District 87, 8.58%
14. District 78, 8.8%
15. District 95, 7.92%
16. District 56, 9.28%
17. District 96, 9.45%

== Detailed results ==
=== District 1 ===
Kansas House of Representatives District 1 Republican primary election, 2024
Party	Candidate	Votes	%
Republican	Dale Helwig	3,022	100%
Total votes		3,022	100%

Kansas House of Representatives District 1 Democratic primary election, 2024
Party	Candidate	Votes	%
Democratic	Janie G. Jarrett	637	78.74%
Democratic	Paul D. Rogers	172	21.26%
Total votes		809	100%

Kansas House of Representatives District 1 general election, 2024
Party	Candidate	Votes	%
Republican	Dale Helwig	7,805	74.68%
Democratic	Janie G. Jarrett	2,646	25.32%
Total votes		10,451	100%
Republican hold			

=== District 2 ===
Kansas House of Representatives District 2 Republican primary election, 2024
Party	Candidate	Votes	%
Republican	Ken Collins (incumbent)	1,852	100%
Total votes		1,852	100%

Kansas House of Representatives District 2 Democratic primary election, 2024
Party	Candidate	Votes	%
Democratic	Melesia Rhodes	653	100%
Total votes		653	100%

Kansas House of Representatives District 2 general election, 2024
Party	Candidate	Votes	%
Republican	Ken Collins (incumbent)	7,547	69.23%
Democratic	Melesia Rhodes	3,355	30.77%
Total votes		10,902	100%
Republican hold			

=== District 3 ===
Kansas House of Representatives District 3 Republican primary election, 2024
Party	Candidate	Votes	%
Republican	Chuck Smith (incumbent)	1,011	100%
Total votes		1,011	100%

Kansas House of Representatives District 3 Democratic primary election, 2024
Party	Candidate	Votes	%
Democratic	Jordan Metcalf	748	100%
Total votes		748	100%

Kansas House of Representatives District 3 general election, 2024
Party	Candidate	Votes	%
Republican	Chuck Smith (incumbent)	5,261	60.18%
Democratic	Jordan Metcalf	3,481	39.82%
Total votes		8,742	100%
Republican hold			

=== District 4 ===
Kansas House of Representatives District 4 Republican primary election, 2024
Party	Candidate	Votes	%
Republican	Rick James	2,258	57.37%
Republican	Joshua Jones	1,678	42.63%
Total votes		3,936	100%

Kansas House of Representatives District 4 general election, 2024
Party	Candidate	Votes	%
Republican	Rick James	9,500	100%
Total votes		9,500	100%
Republican hold			

=== District 5 ===
Kansas House of Representatives District 5 Republican primary election, 2024
Party	Candidate	Votes	%
Republican	Carrie Barth (incumbent)	1,793	100%
Total votes		1,793	100%

Kansas House of Representatives District 5 Democratic primary election, 2024
Party	Candidate	Votes	%
Democratic	Henry Johns	742	100%
Total votes		742	100%

Kansas House of Representatives District 5 general election, 2024
Party	Candidate	Votes	%
Republican	Carrie Barth (incumbent)	8,464	68.34%
Democratic	Henry Johns	3,921	31.66%
Total votes		12,385	100%
Republican hold			

=== District 6 ===
Kansas House of Representatives District 6 Republican primary election, 2024
Party	Candidate	Votes	%
Republican	Samantha Poetter Parshall (incumbent)	2,152	100%
Total votes		2,152	100%

Kansas House of Representatives District 6 Democratic primary election, 2024
Party	Candidate	Votes	%
Democratic	Elena Super	453	100%
Total votes		453	100%

Kansas House of Representatives District 6 general election, 2024
Party	Candidate	Votes	%
Republican	Samantha Poetter Parshall (incumbent)	8,703	70.74%
Democratic	Elena Super	3,600	29.26%
Total votes		12,303	100%
Republican hold			

=== District 7 ===
Kansas House of Representatives District 7 Republican primary election, 2024
Party	Candidate	Votes	%
Republican	Dan Goddard (incumbent)	2,140	100%
Total votes		2,140	100%

Kansas House of Representatives District 7 Democratic primary election, 2024
Party	Candidate	Votes	%
Democratic	Vicki N. Pribble	446	100%
Total votes		446	100%

Kansas House of Representatives District 7 general election, 2024
Party	Candidate	Votes	%
Republican	Dan Goddard (incumbent)	6,595	73.51%
Democratic	Vicki N. Pribble	2,377	26.49%
Total votes		8,972	100%
Republican hold			

=== District 8 ===
Kansas House of Representatives District 8 Republican primary election, 2024
Party	Candidate	Votes	%
Republican	Chris Croft (incumbent)	1,505	100%
Total votes		1,505	100%

Kansas House of Representatives District 8 Democratic primary election, 2024
Party	Candidate	Votes	%
Democratic	Pam Shernuk	789	100%
Total votes		789	100%

Kansas House of Representatives District 8 general election, 2024
Party	Candidate	Votes	%
Republican	Chris Croft (incumbent)	7,287	55.26%
Democratic	Pam Shernuk	5,899	44.74%
Total votes		13,186	100%
Republican hold			

=== District 9 ===
Kansas House of Representatives District 9 Republican primary election, 2024
Party	Candidate	Votes	%
Republican	Fred Gardner (incumbent)	3,076	100%
Total votes		3,076	100%

Kansas House of Representatives District 9 general election, 2024
Party	Candidate	Votes	%
Republican	Fred Gardner (incumbent)	9,944	100%
Total votes		9,944	100%
Republican hold			

=== District 10 ===
Kansas House of Representatives District 10 Democratic primary election, 2024
Party	Candidate	Votes	%
Democratic	Suzanne Wikle	1,790	90.63%
Democratic	Zachary Thomas Hawkins	185	9.37%
Total votes		1,975	100%

Kansas House of Representatives District 10 general election, 2024
Party	Candidate	Votes	%
Democratic	Suzanne Wikle	7,864	100%
Total votes		7,864	100%
Democratic hold			

=== District 11 ===
Kansas House of Representatives District 11 Republican primary election, 2024
Party	Candidate	Votes	%
Republican	Ron Bryce (incumbent)	2,217	100%
Total votes		2,217	100%

Kansas House of Representatives District 11 general election, 2024
Party	Candidate	Votes	%
Republican	Ron Bryce (incumbent)	7,653	100%
Total votes		7,653	100%
Republican hold			

=== District 12 ===
Kansas House of Representatives District 12 Republican primary election, 2024
Party	Candidate	Votes	%
Republican	Doug Blex (incumbent)	2,217	100%
Total votes		2,217	100%

Kansas House of Representatives District 12 general election, 2024
Party	Candidate	Votes	%
Republican	Doug Blex (incumbent)	10,133	100%
Total votes		10,133	100%
Republican hold			

=== District 13 ===
Kansas House of Representatives District 13 Republican primary election, 2024
Party	Candidate	Votes	%
Republican	Duane Droge (incumbent)	3,161	100%
Total votes		3,161	100%

Kansas House of Representatives District 13 Democratic primary election, 2024
Party	Candidate	Votes	%
Democratic	Edgar D. Chrisman	310	100%
Total votes		310	100%

Kansas House of Representatives District 13 general election, 2024
Party	Candidate	Votes	%
Republican	Duane Droge (incumbent)	8,065	80.26%
Democratic	Edgar D. Chrisman	1,984	19.74%
Total votes		10,049	100%
Republican hold			

=== District 14 ===
Kansas House of Representatives District 14 Republican primary election, 2024
Party	Candidate	Votes	%
Republican	Charlotte Esau	1,958	100%
Total votes		1,958	100%

Kansas House of Representatives District 14 Democratic primary election, 2024
Party	Candidate	Votes	%
Democratic	Dennis Miller (incumbent)	1,467	100%
Total votes		1,467	100%

Kansas House of Representatives District 14 general election, 2024
Party	Candidate	Votes	%
Republican	Charlotte Esau	7,589	51.37%
Democratic	Dennis Miller (incumbent)	7,185	48.63%
Total votes		14,774	100%
Republican gain from Democratic			

=== District 15 ===
Kansas House of Representatives District 15 Republican primary election, 2024
Party	Candidate	Votes	%
Republican	Lauren N. Bohi	914	100%
Total votes		914	100%

Kansas House of Representatives District 15 Democratic primary election, 2024
Party	Candidate	Votes	%
Democratic	Allison Hougland (incumbent)	756	100%
Total votes		756	100%

Kansas House of Representatives District 15 general election, 2024
Party	Candidate	Votes	%
Republican	Lauren N. Bohi	3,935	50.68%
Democratic	Allison Hougland (incumbent)	3,829	49.32%
Total votes		7,764	100%
Republican gain from Democratic			

=== District 16 ===
Kansas House of Representatives District 16 Democratic primary election, 2024
Party	Candidate	Votes	%
Democratic	Linda Featherston (incumbent)	1,374	100%
Total votes		1,374	100%

Kansas House of Representatives District 16 general election, 2024
Party	Candidate	Votes	%
Democratic	Linda Featherston (incumbent)	8,742	100%
Total votes		8,742	100%
Democratic hold			

=== District 17 ===
Kansas House of Representatives District 17 Democratic primary election, 2024
Party	Candidate	Votes	%
Democratic	Jo Ella Hoye (incumbent)	1,568	100%
Total votes		1,568	100%

Kansas House of Representatives District 17 general election, 2024
Party	Candidate	Votes	%
Democratic	Jo Ella Hoye (incumbent)	8,150	66.68%
Libertarian	Michael Kerner	4,073	33.32%
Total votes		12,223	100%
Democratic hold			

=== District 18 ===
Kansas House of Representatives District 18 Republican primary election, 2024
Party	Candidate	Votes	%
Republican	Robert Whitman	1,385	100%
Total votes		1,385	100%

Kansas House of Representatives District 18 Democratic primary election, 2024
Party	Candidate	Votes	%
Democratic	Cindy Neighbor (incumbent)	1,514	100%
Total votes		1,514	100%

Kansas House of Representatives District 18 general election, 2024
Party	Candidate	Votes	%
Democratic	Cindy Neighbor (incumbent)	7,049	55.96%
Republican	Robert Whitman	4,988	39.60%
Libertarian	Steven A. Hohe	560	4.45%
Total votes		12,597	100%
Democratic hold			

=== District 19 ===
Kansas House of Representatives District 19 Republican primary election, 2024
Party	Candidate	Votes	%
Republican	Mark Hermes	1,084	68.26%
Republican	Anthony Marshall Orwick	504	31.74%
Total votes		1,588	100%

Kansas House of Representatives District 19 Democratic primary election, 2024
Party	Candidate	Votes	%
Democratic	Stephanie Clayton (incumbent)	2,064	100%
Total votes		2,064	100%

Kansas House of Representatives District 19 general election, 2024
Party	Candidate	Votes	%
Democratic	Stephanie Clayton (incumbent)	9,682	62.44%
Republican	Mark Hermes	5,823	37.56%
Total votes		15,505	100%
Democratic hold			

=== District 20 ===
Kansas House of Representatives District 20 Republican primary election, 2024
Party	Candidate	Votes	%
Republican	Jerry Charlton	1,601	100%
Total votes		1,601	100%

Kansas House of Representatives District 20 Democratic primary election, 2024
Party	Candidate	Votes	%
Democratic	Mari-Lynn Poskin (incumbent)	1,738	100%
Total votes		1,738	100%

Kansas House of Representatives District 20 general election, 2024
Party	Candidate	Votes	%
Democratic	Mari-Lynn Poskin (incumbent)	8,826	57.58%
Republican	Jerry Charlton	6,501	42.42%
Total votes		15,327	100%
Democratic hold			

=== District 21 ===
Kansas House of Representatives District 21 Democratic primary election, 2024
Party	Candidate	Votes	%
Democratic	Jerry Stogsdill (incumbent)	2,026	100%
Total votes		2,026	100%

Kansas House of Representatives District 21 general election, 2024
Party	Candidate	Votes	%
Democratic	Jerry Stogsdill (incumbent)	10,708	100%
Total votes		10,708	100%
Democratic hold			

=== District 22 ===
Kansas House of Representatives District 22 Democratic primary election, 2024
Party	Candidate	Votes	%
Democratic	Lindsay Vaughn (incumbent)	1,555	100%
Total votes		1,555	100%

Kansas House of Representatives District 22 general election, 2024
Party	Candidate	Votes	%
Democratic	Lindsay Vaughn (incumbent)	8,149	100%
Total votes		8,149	100%
Democratic hold			

=== District 23 ===
Kansas House of Representatives District 23 Democratic primary election, 2024
Party	Candidate	Votes	%
Democratic	Susan Ruiz (incumbent)	1,311	100%
Total votes		1,311	100%

Kansas House of Representatives District 23 general election, 2024
Party	Candidate	Votes	%
Democratic	Susan Ruiz (incumbent)	7,536	100%
Total votes		7,536	100%
Democratic hold			

=== District 24 ===
Kansas House of Representatives District 24 Republican primary election, 2024
Party	Candidate	Votes	%
Republican	Dale L. Redick	832	100%
Total votes		832	100%

Kansas House of Representatives District 24 Democratic primary election, 2024
Party	Candidate	Votes	%
Democratic	Jarrod Ousley (incumbent)	1,580	100%
Total votes		1,580	100%

Kansas House of Representatives District 24 general election, 2024
Party	Candidate	Votes	%
Democratic	Jarrod Ousley (incumbent)	7,121	64.82%
Republican	Dale L. Redick	3,865	35.18%
Total votes		10,986	100%
Democratic hold			

=== District 25 ===
Kansas House of Representatives District 25 Republican primary election, 2024
Party	Candidate	Votes	%
Republican	Greg J. Schoofs	1,179	100%
Total votes		1,179	100%

Kansas House of Representatives District 25 Democratic primary election, 2024
Party	Candidate	Votes	%
Democratic	Rui Xu (incumbent)	2,136	100%
Total votes		2,136	100%

Kansas House of Representatives District 25 general election, 2024
Party	Candidate	Votes	%
Democratic	Rui Xu (incumbent)	9,719	64.46%
Republican	Greg J. Schoofs	5,358	35.54%
Total votes		15,077	100%
Democratic hold			

=== District 26 ===
Kansas House of Representatives District 26 Republican primary election, 2024
Party	Candidate	Votes	%
Republican	Chip VanHouden	1,556	100%
Total votes		1,556	100%

Kansas House of Representatives District 26 general election, 2024
Party	Candidate	Votes	%
Republican	Chip VanHouden	10,502	100%
Total votes		10,502	100%
Republican hold			

=== District 27 ===
Kansas House of Representatives District 27 Republican primary election, 2024
Party	Candidate	Votes	%
Republican	Sean Tarwater (incumbent)	1,937	100%
Total votes		1,937	100%

Kansas House of Representatives District 27 Democratic primary election, 2024
Party	Candidate	Votes	%
Democratic	David Benson	973	100%
Total votes		973	100%

Kansas House of Representatives District 27 general election, 2024
Party	Candidate	Votes	%
Republican	Sean Tarwater (incumbent)	9,049	58.93%
Democratic	David Benson	6,307	41.07%
Total votes		15,356	100%
Republican hold			

=== District 28 ===
Kansas House of Representatives District 28 Republican primary election, 2024
Party	Candidate	Votes	%
Republican	Carl Turner (incumbent)	1,540	100%
Total votes		1,540	100%

Kansas House of Representatives District 28 Democratic primary election, 2024
Party	Candidate	Votes	%
Democratic	Ace Allen	1,076	100%
Total votes		1,076	100%

Kansas House of Representatives District 28 general election, 2024
Party	Candidate	Votes	%
Republican	Carl Turner (incumbent)	6,604	50.59%
Democratic	Ace Allen	6,449	49.41%
Total votes		13,053	100%
Republican hold			

=== District 29 ===
Kansas House of Representatives District 29 Democratic primary election, 2024
Party	Candidate	Votes	%
Democratic	Heather Meyer (incumbent)	1,413	100%
Total votes		1,413	100%

Kansas House of Representatives District 29 general election, 2024
Party	Candidate	Votes	%
Democratic	Heather Meyer (incumbent)	8,708	100%
Total votes		8,708	100%
Democratic hold			

=== District 30 ===
Kansas House of Representatives District 30 Republican primary election, 2024
Party	Candidate	Votes	%
Republican	Laura Williams (incumbent)	1,380	100%
Total votes		1,380	100%

Kansas House of Representatives District 30 Democratic primary election, 2024
Party	Candidate	Votes	%
Democratic	Betsey Lasister	1,022	100%
Total votes		1,022	100%

Kansas House of Representatives District 30 general election, 2024
Party	Candidate	Votes	%
Republican	Laura Williams	6,149	52.60%
Democratic	Betsey Lasister	5,542	47.40%
Total votes		11,691	100%
Republican hold			

=== District 31 ===
Kansas House of Representatives District 31 Republican primary election, 2024
Party	Candidate	Votes	%
Republican	Dennis Grindel	202	100%
Total votes		202	100%

Kansas House of Representatives District 31 Democratic primary election, 2024
Party	Candidate	Votes	%
Democratic	Louis Ruiz (incumbent)	732	100%
Total votes		732	100%

Kansas House of Representatives District 31 general election, 2024
Party	Candidate	Votes	%
Democratic	Louis Ruiz (incumbent)	4,405	70.28%
Republican	Dennis Grindel	1,863	29.72%
Total votes		6,268	100%
Democratic hold			

=== District 32 ===
Kansas House of Representatives District 32 Republican primary election, 2024
Party	Candidate	Votes	%
Republican	Joe Quinn	109	100%
Total votes		109	100%

Kansas House of Representatives District 32 Democratic primary election, 2024
Party	Candidate	Votes	%
Democratic	Pam Curtis (incumbent)	584	100%
Total votes		584	100%

Kansas House of Representatives District 32 general election, 2024
Party	Candidate	Votes	%
Democratic	Pam Curtis (incumbent)	2,636	74.15%
Republican	Joe Quinn	919	25.85%
Total votes		3,555	100%
Democratic hold			

=== District 33 ===
Kansas House of Representatives District 33 Republican primary election, 2024
Party	Candidate	Votes	%
Republican	Mike Thompson (incumbent)	926	90.70%
Republican	Clifton N. Boje	95	9.30%
Total votes		1,021	100%

Kansas House of Representatives District 33 Democratic primary election, 2024
Party	Candidate	Votes	%
Democratic	Eli Woody	583	57.95%
Democratic	Mathew Reinhold	423	42.05%
Total votes		1,006	100%

Kansas House of Representatives District 33 general election, 2024
Party	Candidate	Votes	%
Republican	Mike Thompson (incumbent)	5,244	56.67%
Democratic	Eli Woody	4,009	43.33%
Total votes		9,253	100%
Republican hold			

=== District 34 ===
Kansas House of Representatives District 34 Democratic primary election, 2024
Party	Candidate	Votes	%
Democratic	Valdenia Winn (incumbent)	1,061	100%
Total votes		1,061	100%

Kansas House of Representatives District 34 general election, 2024
Party	Candidate	Votes	%
Democratic	Valdenia Winn (incumbent)	3,894	100%
Total votes		3,894	100%
Democratic hold			

=== District 35 ===
Kansas House of Representatives District 35 Democratic primary election, 2024
Party	Candidate	Votes	%
Democratic	Wanda Brownlee Paige (incumbent)	835	48.72%
Democratic	Marvin Robinson	383	22.35%
Democratic	Michelle Watley	345	20.13%
Democratic	Kimberly DeWitt	151	8.81%
Total votes		1,714	100%

Kansas House of Representatives District 35 general election, 2024
Party	Candidate	Votes	%
Democratic	Wanda Brownlee Paige (incumbent)	4,837	100%
Total votes		4,837	100%
Democratic hold			

=== District 36 ===
Kansas House of Representatives District 36 Republican primary election, 2024
Party	Candidate	Votes	%
Republican	Mark Gilstrap	786	100%
Total votes		786	100%

Kansas House of Representatives District 36 Democratic primary election, 2024
Party	Candidate	Votes	%
Democratic	Lynn Melton (incumbent)	1,811	100%
Total votes		1,811	100%

Kansas House of Representatives District 36 general election, 2024
Party	Candidate	Votes	%
Democratic	Lynn Melton (incumbent)	6,629	60.95%
Republican	Mark Gilstrap	4,247	39.05%
Total votes		10,876	100%
Democratic hold			

=== District 37 ===
Kansas House of Representatives District 37 Republican primary election, 2024
Party	Candidate	Votes	%
Republican	Kevan Myers	367	100%
Total votes		367	100%

Kansas House of Representatives District 37 Democratic primary election, 2024
Party	Candidate	Votes	%
Democratic	Melissa Oropeza (incumbent)	893	100%
Total votes		893	100%

Kansas House of Representatives District 37 general election, 2024
Party	Candidate	Votes	%
Democratic	Melissa Oropeza (incumbent)	4,336	62.82%
Republican	Kevan Myers	2,566	37.18%
Total votes		6,902	100%
Democratic hold			

=== District 38 ===
Kansas House of Representatives District 38 Republican primary election, 2024
Party	Candidate	Votes	%
Republican	Timothy H. Johnson (incumbent)	2,435	100%
Total votes		2,435	100%

Kansas House of Representatives District 38 Democratic primary election, 2024
Party	Candidate	Votes	%
Democratic	Richard Paz	762	100%
Total votes		762	100%

Kansas House of Representatives District 38 general election, 2024
Party	Candidate	Votes	%
Republican	Timothy H. Johnson (incumbent)	8,965	66.42%
Democratic	Richard Paz	4,533	33.58%
Total votes		13,498	100%
Republican hold			

=== District 39 ===
Kansas House of Representatives District 39 Republican primary election, 2024
Party	Candidate	Votes	%
Republican	Angela Stiens	1,448	100%
Total votes		1,448	100%

Kansas House of Representatives District 39 Democratic primary election, 2024
Party	Candidate	Votes	%
Democratic	Vanessa Vaughn West	1,149	100%
Total votes		1,149	100%

Kansas House of Representatives District 39 general election, 2024
Party	Candidate	Votes	%
Republican	Angela Stiens	6,837	51.58%
Democratic	Vanessa Vaughn West	6,418	48.42%
Total votes		13,255	100%
Republican hold			

=== District 40 ===
Kansas House of Representatives District 40 Republican primary election, 2024
Party	Candidate	Votes	%
Republican	David Buehler (incumbent)	1,892	100%
Total votes		1,892	100%

Kansas House of Representatives District 40 general election, 2024
Party	Candidate	Votes	%
Republican	David Buehler (incumbent)	7,678	100%
Total votes		7,678	100%
Republican hold			

=== District 41 ===
Kansas House of Representatives District 41 Republican primary election, 2024
Party	Candidate	Votes	%
Republican	Pat Proctor (incumbent)	910	65.85%
Republican	Robert Owens	472	34.15%
Total votes		1,382	100%

Kansas House of Representatives District 41 Democratic primary election, 2024
Party	Candidate	Votes	%
Democratic	Aimee M. Bateman	477	100%
Total votes		477	100%

Kansas House of Representatives District 41 general election, 2024
Party	Candidate	Votes	%
Republican	Pat Proctor (incumbent)	3,338	52.55%
Democratic	Aimee M. Bateman	3,014	47.45%
Total votes		6,352	100%
Republican hold			

=== District 42 ===
Kansas House of Representatives District 42 Republican primary election, 2024
Party	Candidate	Votes	%
Republican	Lance Neelly (incumbent)	1,237	50.76%
Republican	Mike Stieben	1,200	49.24%
Total votes		2,437	100%

Kansas House of Representatives District 42 Democratic primary election, 2024
Party	Candidate	Votes	%
Democratic	Eddy Martinez	670	100%
Total votes		670	100%

Kansas House of Representatives District 42 general election, 2024
Party	Candidate	Votes	%
Republican	Lance Neelly (incumbent)	7,866	66.40%
Democratic	Eddy Martinez	3,980	33.60%
Total votes		11,846	100%
Republican hold			

=== District 43 ===
Kansas House of Representatives District 43 Republican primary election, 2024
Party	Candidate	Votes	%
Republican	Bill Sutton (incumbent)	1,376	100%
Total votes		1,376	100%

Kansas House of Representatives District 43 general election, 2024
Party	Candidate	Votes	%
Republican	Bill Sutton (incumbent)	8,166	100%
Total votes		8,166	100%
Republican hold			

=== District 44 ===
Kansas House of Representatives District 44 Democratic primary election, 2024
Party	Candidate	Votes	%
Democratic	Barbara Ballard (incumbent)	2,335	100%
Total votes		2,335	100%

Kansas House of Representatives District 44 general election, 2024
Party	Candidate	Votes	%
Democratic	Barbara Ballard (incumbent)	10,466	100%
Total votes		10,466	100%
Democratic hold			

=== District 45 ===
Kansas House of Representatives District 45 Democratic primary election, 2024
Party	Candidate	Votes	%
Democratic	Mike Amyx (incumbent)	2,237	100%
Total votes		2,237	100%

Kansas House of Representatives District 45 general election, 2024
Party	Candidate	Votes	%
Democratic	Mike Amyx (incumbent)	11,195	100%
Total votes		11,195	100%
Democratic hold			

=== District 46 ===
Kansas House of Representatives District 46 Democratic primary election, 2024
Party	Candidate	Votes	%
Democratic	Brooklynne Mosley	1,377	67.01%
Democratic	Brittany Kathleen Hall	578	28.13%
Democratic	Logan Ginavan	100	4.87%
Total votes		2,055	100%

Kansas House of Representatives District 46 general election, 2024
Party	Candidate	Votes	%
Democratic	Brooklynne Mosley	6,651	100%
Total votes		6,651	100%
Democratic hold			

=== District 47 ===
Kansas House of Representatives District 47 Republican primary election, 2024
Party	Candidate	Votes	%
Republican	Ronald Ellis (incumbent)	1,991	100%
Total votes		1,991	100%

Kansas House of Representatives District 47 Democratic primary election, 2024
Party	Candidate	Votes	%
Democratic	Mary T. Williams	627	100%
Total votes		627	100%

Kansas House of Representatives District 47 general election, 2024
Party	Candidate	Votes	%
Republican	Ronald Ellis (incumbent)	8,298	66.14%
Democratic	Mary T. Williams	4,248	33.86%
Total votes		12,546	100%
Republican hold			

=== District 48 ===
Kansas House of Representatives District 48 Republican primary election, 2024
Party	Candidate	Votes	%
Republican	Randy Ross	952	51.63%
Republican	Debbie Paulbeck	892	48.37%
Total votes		1,844	100%

Kansas House of Representatives District 48 Democratic primary election, 2024
Party	Candidate	Votes	%
Democratic	Dan Osman (incumbent)	1,135	100%
Total votes		1,135	100%

Kansas House of Representatives District 48 general election, 2024
Party	Candidate	Votes	%
Democratic	Dan Osman (incumbent)	6,632	52.88%
Republican	Randy Ross	5,909	47.12%
Total votes		12,541	100%
Democratic hold			

=== District 49 ===
Kansas House of Representatives District 49 Republican primary election, 2024
Party	Candidate	Votes	%
Republican	Kurtis Ruf	1,299	100%
Total votes		1,299	100%

Kansas House of Representatives District 49 Democratic primary election, 2024
Party	Candidate	Votes	%
Democratic	Nikki McDonald (incumbent)	1,083	100%
Total votes		1,083	100%

Kansas House of Representatives District 49 general election, 2024
Party	Candidate	Votes	%
Democratic	Nikki McDonald (incumbent)	6,305	50.59%
Republican	Kurtis Ruf	6,157	49.41%
Total votes		12,462	100%
Democratic hold			

=== District 50 ===
Kansas House of Representatives District 50 Republican primary election, 2024
Party	Candidate	Votes	%
Republican	Kyle McNorton (incumbent)	2,135	100%
Total votes		2,135	100%

Kansas House of Representatives District 50 Democratic primary election, 2024
Party	Candidate	Votes	%
Democratic	Jessica Porter	684	100%
Total votes		684	100%

Kansas House of Representatives District 50 general election, 2024
Party	Candidate	Votes	%
Republican	Kyle McNorton (incumbent)	8,663	66.34%
Democratic	Jessica Porter	4,396	33.66%
Total votes		13,059	100%
Republican hold			

=== District 51 ===
Kansas House of Representatives District 51 Republican primary election, 2024
Party	Candidate	Votes	%
Republican	Megan D. Steele	1,572	50.35%
Republican	Eli Kormanik	1,550	49.65%
Total votes		3,122	100%

Kansas House of Representatives District 51 Democratic primary election, 2024
Party	Candidate	Votes	%
Democratic	Linda Morse	417	100%
Total votes		417	100%

Kansas House of Representatives District 51 general election, 2024
Party	Candidate	Votes	%
Republican	Megan D. Steele	8,090	68.78%
Democratic	Linda Morse	3,672	31.22%
Total votes		11,762	100%
Republican hold			

=== District 52 ===
Kansas House of Representatives District 52 Republican primary election, 2024
Party	Candidate	Votes	%
Republican	Jesse Borjon (incumbent)	2,570	100%
Total votes		2,570	100%

Kansas House of Representatives District 52 Democratic primary election, 2024
Party	Candidate	Votes	%
Democratic	Jacquie Whitney Lightcap	977	100%
Total votes		977	100%

Kansas House of Representatives District 52 general election, 2024
Party	Candidate	Votes	%
Republican	Jesse Borjon (incumbent)	7,646	55.64%
Democratic	Jacquie Whitney Lightcap	6,097	44.36%
Total votes		13,743	100%
Republican hold			

=== District 53 ===
Kansas House of Representatives District 53 Republican primary election, 2024
Party	Candidate	Votes	%
Republican	Jeff Coen	1,590	100%
Total votes		1,590	100%

Kansas House of Representatives District 53 Democratic primary election, 2024
Party	Candidate	Votes	%
Democratic	Kirk Haskins (incumbent)	1,030	100%
Total votes		1,030	100%

Kansas House of Representatives District 53 general election, 2024
Party	Candidate	Votes	%
Democratic	Kirk Haskins (incumbent)	5,556	51.10%
Republican	Jeff Coen	4,742	43.61%
Libertarian	Aric Hermann	575	5.29%
Total votes		10,873	100%
Democratic hold			

=== District 54 ===
Kansas House of Representatives District 54 Republican primary election, 2024
Party	Candidate	Votes	%
Republican	Ken Corbet (incumbent)	2,323	100%
Total votes		2,323	100%

Kansas House of Representatives District 54 Democratic primary election, 2024
Party	Candidate	Votes	%
Democratic	Jade Pearson Ramsdell	605	100%
Total votes		605	100%

Kansas House of Representatives District 54 general election, 2024
Party	Candidate	Votes	%
Republican	Ken Corbet (incumbent)	8,028	67.73%
Democratic	Jade Pearson Ramsdell	3,825	32.27%
Total votes		11,853	100%
Republican hold			

=== District 55 ===
Kansas House of Representatives District 55 Republican primary election, 2024
Party	Candidate	Votes	%
Republican	Michael Barron	814	100%
Total votes		814	100%

Kansas House of Representatives District 55 Democratic primary election, 2024
Party	Candidate	Votes	%
Democratic	Tobias Schlingensiepen (incumbent)	1,515	100%
Total votes		1,515	100%

Kansas House of Representatives District 55 general election, 2024
Party	Candidate	Votes	%
Democratic	Tobias Schlingensiepen (incumbent)	5,662	63.23%
Republican	Michael Barron	3,292	36.77%
Total votes		8,954	100%
Democratic hold			

=== District 56 ===
Kansas House of Representatives District 56 Republican primary election, 2024
Party	Candidate	Votes	%
Republican	Pennie Boyer-Kloos	1,444	100%
Total votes		1,444	100%

Kansas House of Representatives District 56 Democratic primary election, 2024
Party	Candidate	Votes	%
Democratic	Virgil Weigel (incumbent)	1,105	100%
Total votes		1,105	100%

Kansas House of Representatives District 56 general election, 2024
Party	Candidate	Votes	%
Democratic	Virgil Weigel (incumbent)	5,925	54.64%
Republican	Pennie Boyer-Kloos	4,918	45.36%
Total votes		10,843	100%
Democratic hold			

=== District 57 ===
Kansas House of Representatives District 57 Republican primary election, 2024
Party	Candidate	Votes	%
Republican	Donna J. McGinty	659	100%
Total votes		659	100%

Kansas House of Representatives District 57 Democratic primary election, 2024
Party	Candidate	Votes	%
Democratic	John Alcala (incumbent)	979	100%
Total votes		979	100%

Kansas House of Representatives District 57 general election, 2024
Party	Candidate	Votes	%
Democratic	John Alcala (incumbent)	4,140	58.96%
Republican	Donna J. McGinty	2,882	41.04%
Total votes		7,022	100%
Democratic hold			

=== District 58 ===
Kansas House of Representatives District 58 Republican primary election, 2024
Party	Candidate	Votes	%
Republican	Michael Mathewson	721	100%
Total votes		721	100%

Kansas House of Representatives District 58 Democratic primary election, 2024
Party	Candidate	Votes	%
Democratic	Alexis Simmons	1,090	85.22%
Democratic	Wendy Damman-Bednar	189	14.78%
Total votes		1,279	100%

Kansas House of Representatives District 58 general election, 2024
Party	Candidate	Votes	%
Democratic	Alexis Simmons	4,759	63.54%
Republican	Michael Mathewson	2,731	36.46%
Total votes		7,490	100%
Democratic hold			

=== District 59 ===
Kansas House of Representatives District 59 Republican primary election, 2024
Party	Candidate	Votes	%
Republican	Rebecca Schmoe (incumbent)	1,661	100%
Total votes		1,661	100%

Kansas House of Representatives District 59 Democratic primary election, 2024
Party	Candidate	Votes	%
Democratic	Michael Lewis	378	100%
Total votes		378	100%

Kansas House of Representatives District 59 general election, 2024
Party	Candidate	Votes	%
Republican	Rebecca Schmoe (incumbent)	7,895	72.27%
Democratic	Michael Lewis	3,030	27.73%
Total votes		10,925	100%
Republican hold			

=== District 60 ===
Kansas House of Representatives District 60 Republican primary election, 2024
Party	Candidate	Votes	%
Republican	Mark Schreiber (incumbent)	1,105	64.43%
Republican	Will Spencer	610	35.57%
Total votes		1,715	100%

Kansas House of Representatives District 60 Democratic primary election, 2024
Party	Candidate	Votes	%
Democratic	Mic McGuire	582	100%
Total votes		582	100%

Kansas House of Representatives District 60 general election, 2024
Party	Candidate	Votes	%
Republican	Mark Schreiber (incumbent)	4,948	58.02%
Democratic	Mic McGuire	3,580	41.98%
Total votes		8,528	100%
Republican hold			

=== District 61 ===
Kansas House of Representatives District 61 Republican primary election, 2024
Party	Candidate	Votes	%
Republican	Francis Awerkamp (incumbent)	3,033	100%
Total votes		3,033	100%

Kansas House of Representatives District 61 general election, 2024
Party	Candidate	Votes	%
Republican	Francis Awerkamp (incumbent)	6,678	64.97%
Libertarian	Robert Thomas	3,600	35.03%
Total votes		10,278	100%
Republican hold			

=== District 62 ===
Kansas House of Representatives District 62 Republican primary election, 2024
Party	Candidate	Votes	%
Republican	Sean M. Willcott	1,825	39.48%
Republican	Dylan Keim	1,675	36.23%
Republican	Dorothy Goodman	1,123	24.29%
Total votes		4,623	100%

Kansas House of Representatives District 62 general election, 2024
Party	Candidate	Votes	%
Republican	Sean M. Willcott	9,874	100%
Total votes		9,874	100%
Republican hold			

=== District 63 ===
Kansas House of Representatives District 63 Republican primary election, 2024
Party	Candidate	Votes	%
Republican	Allen B. Reavis	2,944	100%
Total votes		2,944	100%

Kansas House of Representatives District 63 general election, 2024
Party	Candidate	Votes	%
Republican	Allen B. Reavis	8,881	100%
Total votes		8,881	100%
Republican hold			

=== District 64 ===
Kansas House of Representatives District 64 Republican primary election, 2024
Party	Candidate	Votes	%
Republican	Lewis Bloom (incumbent)	2,059	100%
Total votes		2,059	100%

Kansas House of Representatives District 64 general election, 2024
Party	Candidate	Votes	%
Republican	Lewis Bloom (incumbent)	8,214	100%
Total votes		8,214	100%
Republican hold			

=== District 65 ===
Kansas House of Representatives District 65 Republican primary election, 2024
Party	Candidate	Votes	%
Republican	Shawn Chauncey	504	54.96%
Republican	Jeff Underhill (incumbent)	413	45.04%
Total votes		917	100%

Kansas House of Representatives District 65 Democratic primary election, 2024
Party	Candidate	Votes	%
Democratic	Lorraine M. Ceniceros	302	100%
Total votes		302	100%

Kansas House of Representatives District 65 general election, 2024
Party	Candidate	Votes	%
Republican	Shawn Chauncey	3,519	57.02%
Democratic	Lorraine M. Ceniceros	2,653	42.98%
Total votes		6,172	100%
Republican hold			

=== District 66 ===
Kansas House of Representatives District 66 Democratic primary election, 2024
Party	Candidate	Votes	%
Democratic	Sydney Carlin (incumbent)	313	100%
Total votes		313	100%

Kansas House of Representatives District 66 general election, 2024
Party	Candidate	Votes	%
Democratic	Sydney Carlin (incumbent)	4,546	100%
Total votes		4,546	100%
Democratic hold			

=== District 67 ===
Kansas House of Representatives District 67 Republican primary election, 2024
Party	Candidate	Votes	%
Republican	Angelina Roeser	643	51.11%
Republican	Kaleb James	615	48.89%
Total votes		1,258	100%

Kansas House of Representatives District 67 Democratic primary election, 2024
Party	Candidate	Votes	%
Democratic	Kim Zito	476	100%
Total votes		476	100%

Kansas House of Representatives District 67 general election, 2024
Party	Candidate	Votes	%
Republican	Angelina Roeser	5,704	52.43%
Democratic	Kim Zito	5,175	47.57%
Total votes		10,879	100%
Republican hold			

=== District 68 ===
Kansas House of Representatives District 68 Republican primary election, 2024
Party	Candidate	Votes	%
Republican	Nathan Butler (incumbent)	1,656	100%
Total votes		1,656	100%

Kansas House of Representatives District 68 Democratic primary election, 2024
Party	Candidate	Votes	%
Democratic	Michael Seymour II	263	100%
Total votes		263	100%

Kansas House of Representatives District 68 general election, 2024
Party	Candidate	Votes	%
Republican	Nathan Butler (incumbent)	4,417	68.94%
Democratic	Michael Seymour II	1,990	31.06%
Total votes		6,407	100%
Republican hold			

=== District 69 ===
Kansas House of Representatives District 69 Republican primary election, 2024
Party	Candidate	Votes	%
Republican	Clarke Sanders (incumbent)	1,090	100%
Total votes		1,090	100%

Kansas House of Representatives District 69 Democratic primary election, 2024
Party	Candidate	Votes	%
Democratic	Lori Blake	290	100%
Total votes		290	100%

Kansas House of Representatives District 69 general election, 2024
Party	Candidate	Votes	%
Republican	Clarke Sanders (incumbent)	5,590	58.21%
Democratic	Lori Blake	4,013	41.79%
Total votes		9,603	100%
Republican hold			

=== District 70 ===
Kansas House of Representatives District 70 Republican primary election, 2024
Party	Candidate	Votes	%
Republican	Scott Hill (incumbent)	3,446	100%
Total votes		3,446	100%

Kansas House of Representatives District 70 general election, 2024
Party	Candidate	Votes	%
Republican	Scott Hill (incumbent)	9,874	100%
Total votes		9,874	100%
Republican hold			

=== District 71 ===
Kansas House of Representatives District 71 Republican primary election, 2024
Party	Candidate	Votes	%
Republican	Steven Howe (incumbent)	1,589	100%
Total votes		1,589	100%

Kansas House of Representatives District 71 general election, 2024
Party	Candidate	Votes	%
Republican	Steven Howe (incumbent)	9,223	100%
Total votes		9,223	100%
Republican hold			

=== District 72 ===
Kansas House of Representatives District 72 Republican primary election, 2024
Party	Candidate	Votes	%
Republican	Avery Anderson (incumbent)	1,797	100%
Total votes		1,797	100%

Kansas House of Representatives District 72 Democratic primary election, 2024
Party	Candidate	Votes	%
Democratic	Heidi Hoskinson	437	100%
Total votes		437	100%

Kansas House of Representatives District 72 general election, 2024
Party	Candidate	Votes	%
Republican	Avery Anderson (incumbent)	6,788	65.14%
Democratic	Heidi Hoskinson	3,633	34.86%
Total votes		10,421	100%
Republican hold			

=== District 73 ===
Kansas House of Representatives District 73 Republican primary election, 2024
Party	Candidate	Votes	%
Republican	Rick Wilborn	1,391	100%
Total votes		1,391	100%

Kansas House of Representatives District 73 general election, 2024
Party	Candidate	Votes	%
Republican	Rick Wilborn	8,973	100%
Total votes		8,973	100%
Republican hold			

=== District 74 ===
Kansas House of Representatives District 74 Republican primary election, 2024
Party	Candidate	Votes	%
Republican	Mike King	2,045	100%
Total votes		2,045	100%

Kansas House of Representatives District 74 Democratic primary election, 2024
Party	Candidate	Votes	%
Democratic	Jenna Ratzlaff	398	100%
Total votes		398	100%

Kansas House of Representatives District 74 general election, 2024
Party	Candidate	Votes	%
Republican	Mike King	7,794	70.66%
Democratic	Jenna Ratzlaff	3,236	29.34%
Total votes		11,030	100%
Republican hold			

=== District 75 ===
Kansas House of Representatives District 75 Republican primary election, 2024
Party	Candidate	Votes	%
Republican	Will Carpenter (incumbent)	1,270	100%
Total votes		1,270	100%

Kansas House of Representatives District 75 general election, 2024
Party	Candidate	Votes	%
Republican	Will Carpenter (incumbent)	8,995	100%
Total votes		8,995	100%
Republican hold			

=== District 76 ===
Kansas House of Representatives District 76 Republican primary election, 2024
Party	Candidate	Votes	%
Republican	Brad Barrett	3,114	100%
Total votes		3,114	100%

Kansas House of Representatives District 76 general election, 2024
Party	Candidate	Votes	%
Republican	Brad Barrett	10,083	100%
Total votes		10,083	100%
Republican hold			

=== District 77 ===
Kansas House of Representatives District 77 Republican primary election, 2024
Party	Candidate	Votes	%
Republican	Kristey Williams (incumbent)	1,780	72.09%
Republican	Douglas Law	689	27.91%
Total votes		2,469	100%

Kansas House of Representatives District 77 general election, 2024
Party	Candidate	Votes	%
Republican	Kristey Williams (incumbent)	9,340	100%
Total votes		9,340	100%
Republican hold			

=== District 78 ===
Kansas House of Representatives District 78 Republican primary election, 2024
Party	Candidate	Votes	%
Republican	Robyn Essex (incumbent)	1,596	100%
Total votes		1,596	100%

Kansas House of Representatives District 78 Democratic primary election, 2024
Party	Candidate	Votes	%
Democratic	Daniel Goodman	1,007	100%
Total votes		1,007	100%

Kansas House of Representatives District 78 general election, 2024
Party	Candidate	Votes	%
Republican	Robyn Essex (incumbent)	6,880	54.40%
Democratic	Daniel Goodman	5,767	45.60%
Total votes		12,647	100%
Republican hold			

=== District 79 ===
Kansas House of Representatives District 79 Republican primary election, 2024
Party	Candidate	Votes	%
Republican	Webster Roth (incumbent)	1,183	100%
Total votes		1,183	100%

Kansas House of Representatives District 79 Democratic primary election, 2024
Party	Candidate	Votes	%
Democratic	Siobhan McIntyre	342	100%
Total votes		342	100%

Kansas House of Representatives District 79 general election, 2024
Party	Candidate	Votes	%
Republican	Webster Roth (incumbent)	7,491	72.75%
Democratic	Siobhan McIntyre	2,806	27.25%
Total votes		10,297	100%
Republican hold			

=== District 80 ===
Kansas House of Representatives District 80 Republican primary election, 2024
Party	Candidate	Votes	%
Republican	Bill Rhiley (incumbent)	1,419	100%
Total votes		1,419	100%

Kansas House of Representatives District 80 general election, 2024
Party	Candidate	Votes	%
Republican	Bill Rhiley (incumbent)	7,369	100%
Total votes		7,369	100%
Republican hold			

=== District 81 ===
Kansas House of Representatives District 81 Republican primary election, 2024
Party	Candidate	Votes	%
Republican	Blake Carpenter (incumbent)	523	100%
Total votes		523	100%

Kansas House of Representatives District 81 general election, 2024
Party	Candidate	Votes	%
Republican	Blake Carpenter (incumbent)	5,896	100%
Total votes		5,896	100%
Republican hold			

=== District 82 ===
Kansas House of Representatives District 82 Republican primary election, 2024
Party	Candidate	Votes	%
Republican	Leah Howell (incumbent)	801	100%
Total votes		801	100%

Kansas House of Representatives District 82 Democratic primary election, 2024
Party	Candidate	Votes	%
Democratic	Kyle Beauchamp	246	100%
Total votes		246	100%

Kansas House of Representatives District 82 general election, 2024
Party	Candidate	Votes	%
Republican	Leah Howell (incumbent)	7,464	67.30%
Democratic	Kyle Beauchamp	3,626	32.70%
Total votes		11,090	100%
Republican hold			

=== District 83 ===
Kansas House of Representatives District 83 Republican primary election, 2024
Party	Candidate	Votes	%
Republican	Erik Seligman	369	100%
Total votes		369	100%

Kansas House of Representatives District 83 Democratic primary election, 2024
Party	Candidate	Votes	%
Democratic	Henry Helgerson (incumbent)	411	100%
Total votes		411	100%

Kansas House of Representatives District 83 general election, 2024
Party	Candidate	Votes	%
Democratic	Henry Helgerson (incumbent)	4,037	58.02%
Republican	Erik Seligman	2,921	41.98%
Total votes		6,958	100%
Democratic hold			

=== District 84 ===
Kansas House of Representatives District 84 Democratic primary election, 2024
Party	Candidate	Votes	%
Democratic	Ford Carr (incumbent)	485	100%
Total votes		485	100%

Kansas House of Representatives District 84 general election, 2024
Party	Candidate	Votes	%
Democratic	Ford Carr (incumbent)	5,195	100%
Total votes		5,195	100%
Democratic hold			

=== District 85 ===
Kansas House of Representatives District 85 Republican primary election, 2024
Party	Candidate	Votes	%
Republican	Patrick Penn (incumbent)	1,163	100%
Total votes		1,163	100%

Kansas House of Representatives District 85 Democratic primary election, 2024
Party	Candidate	Votes	%
Democratic	Aonya Kendrick Barnett	407	100%
Total votes		407	100%

Kansas House of Representatives District 85 general election, 2024
Party	Candidate	Votes	%
Republican	Patrick Penn (incumbent)	6,870	57.85%
Democratic	Aonya Kendrick Barnett	5,005	42.15%
Total votes		11,875	100%
Republican hold			

=== District 86 ===
Kansas House of Representatives District 86 Democratic primary election, 2024
Party	Candidate	Votes	%
Democratic	Silas Miller (incumbent)	353	100%
Total votes		353	100%

Kansas House of Representatives District 86 general election, 2024
Party	Candidate	Votes	%
Democratic	Silas Miller (incumbent)	4,098	100%
Total votes		4,098	100%
Democratic hold			

=== District 87 ===
Kansas House of Representatives District 87 Republican primary election, 2024
Party	Candidate	Votes	%
Republican	Susan Estes (incumbent)	1,056	100%
Total votes		1,056	100%

Kansas House of Representatives District 87 Democratic primary election, 2024
Party	Candidate	Votes	%
Democratic	Mike Snider	456	100%
Total votes		456	100%

Kansas House of Representatives District 87 general election, 2024
Party	Candidate	Votes	%
Republican	Susan Estes (incumbent)	6,105	54.29%
Democratic	Mike Snider	5,140	45.71%
Total votes		11,245	100%
Republican hold			

=== District 88 ===
Kansas House of Representatives District 88 Republican primary election, 2024
Party	Candidate	Votes	%
Republican	Sandy Pickert (incumbent)	514	100%
Total votes		514	100%

Kansas House of Representatives District 88 Democratic primary election, 2024
Party	Candidate	Votes	%
Democratic	Veronica Gillette	319	55.29%
Democratic	Chuck Schmidt	258	44.71%
Total votes		577	100%

Kansas House of Representatives District 88 general election, 2024
Party	Candidate	Votes	%
Republican	Sandy Pickert (incumbent)	4,524	51.06%
Democratic	Veronica Gillette	4,337	48.94%
Total votes		8,861	100%
Republican hold			

=== District 89 ===
Kansas House of Representatives District 89 Democratic primary election, 2024
Party	Candidate	Votes	%
Democratic	KC Ohaebosim (incumbent)	695	100%
Total votes		695	100%

Kansas House of Representatives District 89 general election, 2024
Party	Candidate	Votes	%
Democratic	KC Ohaebosim (incumbent)	5,967	100%
Total votes		5,967	100%
Democratic hold			

=== District 90 ===
Kansas House of Representatives District 90 Republican primary election, 2024
Party	Candidate	Votes	%
Republican	Steve Huebert	1,117	62.86%
Republican	Jesse McCurry	453	25.49%
Republican	Darren Pugh	118	6.64%
Republican	Carl Maughan (incumbent)	89	5.01%
Total votes		1,777	100%

Kansas House of Representatives District 90 Democratic primary election, 2024
Party	Candidate	Votes	%
Democratic	Tracy Edingfield	270	100%
Total votes		270	100%

Kansas House of Representatives District 90 general election, 2024
Party	Candidate	Votes	%
Republican	Steve Huebert	8,243	70.96%
Democratic	Tracy Edingfield	3,373	29.04%
Total votes		11,616	100%
Republican hold			

=== District 91 ===
Kansas House of Representatives District 91 Republican primary election, 2024
Party	Candidate	Votes	%
Republican	Emil Bergquist (incumbent)	1,248	100%
Total votes		1,248	100%

Kansas House of Representatives District 91 Democratic primary election, 2024
Party	Candidate	Votes	%
Democratic	Keisha McClish Couts	364	100%
Total votes		364	100%

Kansas House of Representatives District 91 general election, 2024
Party	Candidate	Votes	%
Republican	Emil Bergquist (incumbent)	8,145	65.89%
Democratic	Keisha McClish Couts	4,216	34.11%
Total votes		12,361	100%
Republican hold			

=== District 92 ===
Kansas House of Representatives District 92 Democratic primary election, 2024
Party	Candidate	Votes	%
Democratic	John Carmichael (incumbent)	639	100%
Total votes		639	100%

Kansas House of Representatives District 92 general election, 2024
Party	Candidate	Votes	%
Democratic	John Carmichael (incumbent)	6,116	100%
Total votes		6,116	100%
Democratic hold			

=== District 93 ===
Kansas House of Representatives District 93 Republican primary election, 2024
Party	Candidate	Votes	%
Republican	Brian Bergkamp (incumbent)	1,466	100%
Total votes		1,466	100%

Kansas House of Representatives District 93 Democratic primary election, 2024
Party	Candidate	Votes	%
Democratic	Justin L. Shore	244	100%
Total votes		244	100%

Kansas House of Representatives District 93 general election, 2024
Party	Candidate	Votes	%
Republican	Brian Bergkamp (incumbent)	8,464	74.72%
Democratic	Justin L. Shore	2,863	25.28%
Total votes		11,327	100%
Republican hold			

=== District 94 ===
Kansas House of Representatives District 94 Republican primary election, 2024
Party	Candidate	Votes	%
Republican	Leo Delperdang (incumbent)	1,808	100%
Total votes		1,808	100%

Kansas House of Representatives District 94 general election, 2024
Party	Candidate	Votes	%
Republican	Leo Delperdang (incumbent)	8,812	100%
Total votes		8,812	100%
Republican hold			

=== District 95 ===
Kansas House of Representatives District 95 Republican primary election, 2024
Party	Candidate	Votes	%
Republican	Christopher Parisho	377	100%
Total votes		377	100%

Kansas House of Representatives District 95 Democratic primary election, 2024
Party	Candidate	Votes	%
Democratic	Tom Sawyer (incumbent)	323	100%
Total votes		323	100%

Kansas House of Representatives District 95 general election, 2024
Party	Candidate	Votes	%
Democratic	Tom Sawyer (incumbent)	3,289	53.96%
Republican	Christopher Parisho	2,806	46.04%
Total votes		6,095	100%
Democratic hold			

=== District 96 ===
Kansas House of Representatives District 96 Republican primary election, 2024
Party	Candidate	Votes	%
Republican	Tom Kessler (incumbent)	362	100%
Total votes		362	100%

Kansas House of Representatives District 96 Democratic primary election, 2024
Party	Candidate	Votes	%
Democratic	Dan Johnson	231	100%
Total votes		231	100%

Kansas House of Representatives District 96 general election, 2024
Party	Candidate	Votes	%
Republican	Tom Kessler (incumbent)	2,947	52.04%
Democratic	Dan Johnson	2,412	42.59%
Libertarian	Joseph Trotter	304	5.37%
Total votes		5,663	100%
Republican hold			

=== District 97 ===
Kansas House of Representatives District 97 Republican primary election, 2024
Party	Candidate	Votes	%
Republican	Nick Hoheisel (incumbent)	713	100%
Total votes		713	100%

Kansas House of Representatives District 97 Democratic primary election, 2024
Party	Candidate	Votes	%
Democratic	Christine Pruitt	265	100%
Total votes		265	100%

Kansas House of Representatives District 97 general election, 2024
Party	Candidate	Votes	%
Republican	Nick Hoheisel (incumbent)	5,177	61.48%
Democratic	Christine Pruitt	3,244	38.52%
Total votes		8,421	100%
Republican hold			

=== District 98 ===
Kansas House of Representatives District 98 Republican primary election, 2024
Party	Candidate	Votes	%
Republican	Cyndi Howerton (incumbent)	492	100%
Total votes		492	100%

Kansas House of Representatives District 98 Democratic primary election, 2024
Party	Candidate	Votes	%
Democratic	Carol Brewer	239	100%
Total votes		239	100%

Kansas House of Representatives District 98 general election, 2024
Party	Candidate	Votes	%
Republican	Cyndi Howerton (incumbent)	4,370	62.22%
Democratic	Carol Brewer	2,654	37.78%
Total votes		7,024	100%
Republican hold			

=== District 99 ===
Kansas House of Representatives District 99 Republican primary election, 2024
Party	Candidate	Votes	%
Republican	Susan Humphries (incumbent)	927	100%
Total votes		927	100%

Kansas House of Representatives District 99 general election, 2024
Party	Candidate	Votes	%
Republican	Susan Humphries (incumbent)	9,696	100%
Total votes		9,696	100%
Republican hold			

=== District 100 ===
Kansas House of Representatives District 100 Republican primary election, 2024
Party	Candidate	Votes	%
Republican	Daniel Hawkins (incumbent)	1,724	100%
Total votes		1,724	100%

Kansas House of Representatives District 100 Democratic primary election, 2024
Party	Candidate	Votes	%
Democratic	Mike McCorkle	548	100%
Total votes		548	100%

Kansas House of Representatives District 100 general election, 2024
Party	Candidate	Votes	%
Republican	Daniel Hawkins (incumbent)	7,368	60.79%
Democratic	Mike McCorkle	4,753	39.21%
Total votes		12,121	100%
Republican hold			

== See also ==
- 2024 Kansas elections
- Elections in Kansas
