= Carol Brewer =

American politician

Member-elect of the Kansas House of Representatives from the 89th district
- Assuming office January 11, 2027
- Succeeding: KC Ohaebosim

Personal details
- Born: Wichita, Kansas
- Party: Democratic
- Parent: Carl Brewer

Carol Brewer is an American politician who is the member-elect for the 89th district of the Kansas House of Representatives. She was elected at the 2026 election succeeding K.C. Ohaebosim who ran for lieutenant governor. She was previously a candidate in 2024. She is the daughter of Carl Brewer, former mayor of Wichita, Kansas. Brewer supports term limits.
