= Diana Dierks =

American politician (born 1944)

Member of the Kansas House of Representatives from the 71st district
- In office January 14, 2013 – January 11, 2021
- Preceded by: Charles Roth
- Succeeded by: Steven Howe

Personal details
- Born: January 13, 1944 (age 82) Sacramento, California, U.S.
- Died: May 19, 2025 Topeka, Kansas
- Party: Republican
- Spouse: Heinz Dierks
- Children: 4
- Education: Butler Community College
- Profession: Broker

Diana Dierks (born January 13, 1944) is an American politician. She served as a Republican member for the 71st district in the Kansas House of Representatives from 2013 to 2021. She was defeated for reelection in 2020 by Steven Howe and she was an unsuccessful candidate for the Democratic nomination for lieutenant governor in 1994.
