= Carl Maughan =

American politician

Member of the Kansas House of Representatives from the 90th district
- In office January 9, 2023 – January 13, 2025
- Preceded by: Steve Huebert
- Succeeded by: Steve Huebert

Personal details
- Party: Republican

Carl Maughan is an American politician. A member of the Republican Party, he served as the representative for 90th district in the Kansas House of Representatives from 2023 to 2025.

In March 2024, Maughan was arrested in Shawnee County on suspicion of driving under the influence. The following day, he stepped down as vice chair of the House Judiciary, though still remained a member. Several months later on May 8, he was officially charged with driving under the influence and possession of a firearm while under the influence. A week later, Maughan suspended his re-election campaign for the 2024 Kansas House of Representatives election, citing "personal and family reasons."

In January 2026, after accepting responsibility for his actions, acknowledging that his behavior in the face of difficult personal and family circumstance was unacceptable, Maughan announced his intent to seek election to the Kansas House of Representatives for District 100. In his announcement, Maughan noted that he had completed multiple rounds of intensive alcohol treatment and sought professional assistance to stabilize his emotional health and ensure continued sobriety.
