= Don Hill (politician) =

American politician (born 1946)

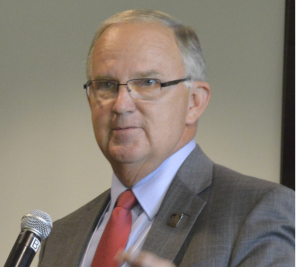

Member of the Kansas House of Representatives from the 60th district
- In office January 6, 2003 – January 9, 2017
- Preceded by: Lloyd A. Stone
- Succeeded by: Mark Schreiber

Personal details
- Born: December 28, 1946 (age 79) Emporia, Kansas, U.S.
- Party: Republican
- Spouse: Robbie Hill
- Education: University of Kansas (BS)

Military service
- Branch/service: United States Army

Don Hill is an American politician and retired pharmacist who served as a member of the member of the Kansas House of Representatives for the 60th district from 2003 to 2017.

== Early life and education ==
Hill was born and raised in Smith Center, Kansas. He earned a Bachelor of Science degree in pharmacy from the University of Kansas.

== Career ==
Hill served as a medical service officer in the United States Army.

Since 1975, Hill has been an adjunct faculty member of the University of Kansas Pharmacy School. He also worked as a pharmacist for the Medicine Shoppe until he sold the business in 2013.

Hill is a former member of the Kansas Pharmacy Service Corporation and a past President of the Emporia Rotary Club, and previously had been involved with the Emporia Regional Development Association, National Community Pharmacists Association, Emporia Chamber of Commerce, Kansas Pharmacist Association, and the Emporia Arts Council.

On August 1, 2017, it was announced that Hill would serve as the government relations consultant for Emporia State University, though he has retired since then.
