= Aaron Coleman =

American politician (born 2000)

Member of the Kansas House of Representatives from the 37th district
- In office January 11, 2021 – January 9, 2023
- Preceded by: Stan Frownfelter
- Succeeded by: Melissa Oropeza

Personal details
- Born: September 20, 2000 (age 26) Kansas City, Kansas, U.S.
- Party: Democratic (before Jan. 2021; Feb. 2021–present)
- Other political affiliations: Independent (Jan.–Feb. 2021)

Aaron Coleman (born September 20, 2000) is an American politician from the state of Kansas. A Democrat, he represented District 37 in the Kansas House of Representatives from 2021 to 2023. The district covers the Turner neighborhood and parts of the Argentine and Armourdale neighborhoods of Kansas City in Wyandotte County, Kansas. Coleman was elected to the Kansas House of Representatives at the age of 20. Coleman previously ran a write-in campaign for governor of Kansas in 2018 and ran for the Kansas City Board of Utilities in 2019.

Coleman's tenure in office was marred by various allegations. He has been accused of engaging in abusive and harassing behavior on a series of occasions and has admitted to and apologized for childhood acts of online bullying, blackmail, and revenge porn. As a juvenile, he pleaded guilty to misdemeanor harassment after threatening to shoot another teen. Following Coleman's 2020 election to the Kansas House of Representatives, many members of his own party called for his resignation due to his acts of misconduct; some called for his removal. In February 2021, the Select Investigating Committee of the Kansas House of Representatives sent Coleman a letter of warning and admonition in regard to past conduct unbecoming of a state legislator. In October 2021, Coleman was arrested on a domestic violence charge; the following month, he was arrested for suspected DUI. Following his 2021 arrests, Gov. Laura Kelly called for his resignation. In February 2022, Coleman was suspended from the state Democratic Party for two years. Also in 2022, Coleman entered into a diversion agreement under which he avoided prosecution for domestic battery; he was not criminally charged in connection with the November 2021 arrest due to a lack of evidence of intoxication.

Coleman sought re-election in 2022, but was defeated in a landslide by Melissa Oropeza in the Democratic primary.

== Early life ==
Coleman comes from Kansas City, Kansas. He has worked as a dishwasher. As of 2020, Coleman attended Johnson County Community College. He is Jewish.

== Political career ==
In 2017, as a seventeen-year-old who had dropped out of high school, Coleman entered the race for governor of Kansas as a write-in independent candidate ahead of the 2018 election. Democrat Laura Kelly won the election.

In 2019, Coleman ran for the board of public utilities in Kansas City.

=== Kansas House of Representatives ===
==== Elections ====
In 2020, Coleman defeated seven-term incumbent Stan Frownfelter in a Democratic primary in Kansas House of Representatives District 37. The victory was considered an upset. Coleman, then 19 years of age, won by just 14 votes. The district covers the Turner neighborhood and parts of the Argentine and Armourdale neighborhoods of Kansas City in Wyandotte County, Kansas.

After Coleman admitted to online bullying, blackmail and revenge porn, Frownfelter announced he would run a write-in campaign against Coleman. Coleman initially dropped out of the race, but later reversed his decision. Democratic House Minority Leader Tom Sawyer, supported Frownfelter's write-in campaign, as did Democratic Governor Laura Kelly. Another candidate, Kristina Smith, a paralegal and treasurer of the Wyandotte County Republican Party, also pursued a write-in campaign. The Kansas Young Democrats endorsed Frownfelter and condemned Coleman.

In August 2020, Coleman told former Republican state lawmaker John Whitmer that he would "laugh and giggle when you get COVID and die". Coleman claimed Whitmer was repeating anti-mask “conspiracy theories”.

Coleman ran on a platform of women's rights (specifically, access to contraceptives and abortion services, as well as equal pay), tuition-free public college, defunding the police, Medicare for all, legalizing cannabis, and the Green New Deal.

Coleman won the general election to the Kansas House of Representatives on November 3, 2020 at the age of 20, garnering 66% of the vote against two write-in candidates, including Frownfelter.

In November 2020, Coleman tweeted that he would "call out a hit" on Kansas Governor Laura Kelly, and predicted she would face an "extremely bloody" Democratic primary in 2022. Coleman said that his tweet was not a call for physical violence against the governor, but an expression of his belief that Kelly's moderate political positions did not appeal to him or the party's left wing; he self-identifies as a democratic socialist. In response, Sawyer and state Democratic chair Vicki Hiatt stated that Democrats in the House would file a complaint against Coleman when he was sworn in and work for the two-thirds vote required to remove him from office. Seven recently elected female Democratic state legislators signed a December 21, 2020, letter calling on Coleman to resign before taking office.

Coleman ran for re-election to the Kansas House of Representatives in 2022. He faced two primary challengers and finished in a distant third with just 13.1% of the vote. Melissa Oropeza, a nurse practitioner, won the Democratic primary with 49.2% of the vote.

==== Tenure ====
On December 31, 2020, Democratic House Minority Leader Tom Sawyer denied Coleman committee assignments in the incoming legislature.

On January 13, 2021, two days after being sworn in to the Kansas House of Representatives, Coleman announced he had left the Democratic Party and would sit as an independent. On February 8, he re-joined the Democrats.

In February 2021, following a hearing, the Select Investigating Committee of the Kansas House of Representatives dismissed a complaint against Coleman regarding acts of misconduct he committed before taking office. The Committee later sent Coleman a letter of warning and admonition in regard to past conduct unbecoming of a state legislator. Following Coleman's October 2021 arrest on domestic violence charges, Sawyer called Coleman's more recent arrest "extremely disturbing news" and said Coleman should "resign and get the help he badly needs." After Coleman was arrested again in November 2021, for allegedly driving under the influence of alcohol, Sawyer again requested Coleman's resignation. Gov. Kelly called for the legislature to expel Coleman if he did not voluntarily leave office. A complaint was filed seeking Coleman's removal from office.

In February 2022, the Kansas Democratic Party suspended Coleman for two years.

=== Other campaigns ===
In November 2023, Coleman was defeated in his bid for a seat on the Turner USD 202 Board of Education in Wyandotte County.

== Legal troubles and allegations of wrongdoing ==
Coleman has been accused of engaging in abusive, harassing and/or unlawful behavior on a series of occasions.

=== Juvenile misconduct ===
After his 2020 Kansas House primary victory, Coleman's past history generated significant controversy, leading to him admitting that he had leaked revenge porn in middle school when he was 12. He has also admitted to bullying, extortion, and threats of physical violence at his middle school.

The Kansas City Star reported that in 2015, when Coleman was 14, he was arrested and charged for threatening to shoot a girl at another high school. He was initially charged with a felony count of making a criminal threat, but later pleaded guilty to a misdemeanor charge of harassment.

Coleman has apologized for his bullying, extortion, and revenge porn activities. Coleman asserted he had experienced child abuse from his elementary school teachers. On June 17, 2020, Coleman said, on Facebook, that he spent “the vast majority” of his elementary school education “in a closet” instead of getting proper help at school. Coleman claims that he was diagnosed with post-traumatic stress disorder at 15. Turner USD #202 school district, where Coleman went to elementary school, stated that it does not “put kids in closets”.

=== Allegations and charges of adult misconduct ===
==== Harassment ====
On December 4, 2020, Kathleen Lynch, a Wyandotte County, Kansas judge, issued a temporary anti-stalking order (no-contact order) against Coleman after Brandie Armstrong, the campaign manager for Frownfelter, accused Coleman of harassment. The two later reached an agreement.

In 2021, Democratic House Minority Leader Tom Sawyer accused Coleman of having threatened Sawyer's former chief of staff, Heather Scanlon.

In October 2021, Kansas Department of Labor Secretary Amber Shultz sent Coleman a letter notifying him that he had been banned from all Department of Labor offices. The letter alleged that Coleman had attempted to enter an employees-only area of the agency's Topeka headquarters and had accosted a police officer in "a loud and demanding tone". Coleman disputed this account.

==== Violence ====
Coleman's ex-girlfriend, Taylor Passow, has alleged that Coleman choked and slapped her in late 2019, and that he had sent her abusive and threatening text messages. Coleman disputed aspects of Passow's account.

On October 30, 2021, Coleman was arrested by Overland Park police on a domestic violence charge. Coleman was alleged to have hit, pushed, and spat upon his brother and to have threatened to "kick" his grandfather's "ass". The domestic dispute allegedly arose from Coleman's objection to his brother's desire to be baptized. Coleman pleaded not guilty and was released on bail. In March 2022, Coleman entered into a diversion agreement in which he "agreed to complete a domestic violence assessment, spend a year in counseling and take random alcohol and drug tests in lieu of facing prosecution for the battery charge".

==== 2021 driving infraction ====
On November 28, 2021, Coleman was arrested in Douglas County, Kansas on suspicion of (DUI). He had been cited for doing 91 mph on an Interstate, and for failing to follow the instructions of the police officer who made the traffic stop. In January 2022, it was announced that no criminal charge would be filed due to lack of evidence of intoxication. Coleman was instead charged with traffic violations for speeding and for failing to yield to emergency vehicles.

== Electoral history ==
Kansas House of Representatives 37th District 2020 Democratic Primary
Party	Candidate	Votes	%
Democratic	Aaron Coleman	823	50.43%
Democratic	Stan Frownfelter (incumbent)	809	49.57%
Total votes		1,632	100.00%

Kansas House of Representatives 37th District 2020 General Election
Party	Candidate	Votes	%
Democratic	Aaron Coleman	3,649	66.45%
Independent	Stan Frownfelter (write-in) (incumbent)	1,222	22.25%
Independent	Kristina Smith (write-in)	620	11.29%
Total votes		5,491	100.00%
Democratic hold			

Kansas House of Representatives 37th District 2022 Democratic Primary
Party	Candidate	Votes	%
Democratic	Melissa Oropeza	1,203	49.16%
Democratic	Faith Rivera	923	37.72%
Democratic	Aaron Coleman (incumbent)	321	13.12%
Total votes		2,447	100.00%

2023 Unified School District No. 202 Board Member election
Candidate	Votes	%
Daniel Soptic (incumbent)	1,111	25.48%
Theresa Tillery (incumbent)	1,058	24.26%
Becky Billigmeier (incumbent)	948	21.74%
Brian Fishbaugh (incumbent)	886	20.18%
Aaron Coleman	319	7.31%
Write-in	39	0.89%
Total votes	4,361	100.00%
