= Patty Markley =

American politician

Member of the Kansas House of Representatives from the 8th district
- In office January 9, 2017 – January 14, 2019
- Preceded by: Craig McPherson
- Succeeded by: Chris Croft

Personal details
- Born: March 27, 1969 (age 57) Kansas City, Missouri
- Party: Republican

Patty Markley (born March 27, 1969) is an American politician who served in the Kansas House of Representatives from the 8th district from 2017 to 2019.

On August 7, 2018, she was defeated in the Republican primary for the 8th district.
