= Roderick Houston =

American politician

Member of the Kansas House of Representatives from the 89th district
- In office January 14, 2013 – January 9, 2017
- Preceded by: Melody McCray-Miller
- Succeeded by: KC Ohaebosim

Personal details
- Born: June 9, 1962 (age 64) Wichita, Kansas, U.S.
- Party: Democratic
- Spouse: Patricia
- Children: 3
- Education: Cowley County Community College; Wichita State University; Kansas Southwest Bible College
- Profession: pastor

Roderick A. Houston (born June 9, 1962) is an American politician and pastor. He served as a Democratic member for the 89th district in the Kansas House of Representatives from 2013 to 2017. He is a senior pastor at the Mount Olive Tabernacle of Praise Church in Wichita.

== Biography ==
As of 2012, he had been a pastor for eight years at the Mount Olive Tabernacle of Praise Church of God. Prior to running for office, he worked for seventeen years at Wichita's school district.

=== Kansas House of Representatives ===
In 2012, he ran to succeed Democratic representative Melody McCray-Miller, where he faced a contested primary.
