= Greg Lakin =

American politician

Member of the Kansas House of Representatives from the 91st district
- In office 2017 – January 8, 2018
- Preceded by: Gene Suellentrop
- Succeeded by: Emil Bergquist

Personal details
- Party: Republican

Greg Lakin is an American politician who served in the Kansas House of Representatives as a Republican for one year, from January 2017 to January 8, 2018.

A physician, Lakin worked as the medical director of a private clinic when he was elected to the state legislature in the 2016 elections. He won the Republican primary election, 64% to 36%, and faced no opposition in the general election. A year after he took office, Lakin resigned his seat after he was appointed by Kansas Governor Sam Brownback as Chief Medical Officer of the Kansas Department of Health and Environment. Local Republican officials chose Emil Bergquist to replace him.
