= Mary Good =

Mary Good may refer to:

- Mary L. Good (1931–2019), American inorganic chemist
- Mary Martha Good (born 1954), member of the Kansas House of Representatives

== See also ==
- Mary Dee (born Mary Goode; 1912–1964), American disc jockey
- Mary Goode (born 1979), Irish field hockey player
- Mary H. Goode (born 1927), Massachusetts politician
