= Kuether =

Kuether is a surname of German origin. Notable people with the surname include:

- Annie Kuether (born 1950), American politician
- Joe Kuether (born 1988), American poker player
- John Ward Kuether (born 1957),

American opera singer and performer
