= 2026 Kansas gubernatorial election =

- November 3, 2026

Nominee	Cindy Holscher	Ty Masterson
Party	Democratic	Republican
Running mate	KC Ohaebosim	Jeff Klemp
Popular vote	562,012	550,643
Percentage	50.51%	49.49%
- Holscher: 50–60% 60–70% 70–80% Masterson: 50–60% 60–70% 70–80% 80–90%
Governor before election
Laura Kelly
Democratic
Elected Governor
Cindy Holscher
Democratic

The 2026 Kansas gubernatorial election took place on November 3, 2026, to elect the next governor of Kansas. The primary elections took place on August 4, 2026.

Democrat Cindy Holscher was declared the winner on November 12, 2026, over Republican Ty Masterson. Holscher's victory was the first time a party won the governorship for the third consecutive time since 1970 when Democratic governor Robert Docking won his third of four two-year terms. Holscher was the first Kansas gubernatorial candidate to receive over 50% of the vote since Republican Sam Brownback in 2010, and the first Democrat to do so since 2006.

Incumbent Democratic governor Laura Kelly was term-limited and ineligible to seek a third consecutive term. Kansas was one of five Democratic-held governorships up for election in states Donald Trump carried in the 2024 presidential election. Of these five, Kansas was the only state that Trump won by a double-digit margin, 57 percent to 41 percent. All five were successfully defended by the Democrats.

== Background ==
Kansas has a long tradition of ticket-splitting at the gubernatorial level as compared to presidential winners. Despite the state's consistent majority support for Republican presidential nominees, Democratic candidates won the governor's office in most of the years since the late 1960s, reflecting a pattern of voters distinguishing between state executive and federal races.

This competitive tradition continued in the 2018 election, when Laura Kelly, a Kansas State Senator, won the open governor's seat in a favorable national environment during the 2018 midterms, and benefited from widespread dissatisfaction with the outgoing administration of Sam Brownback, who had resigned in January 2018 after being confirmed by the Senate as United States Ambassador-at-Large for International Religious Freedom, having been nominated for that position in July 2017. Kelly won re-election in 2022 on the strength of her own personal popularity, with the negative reaction to the overturning of Roe v. Wade providing additional tailwind, amplified by the presence of an abortion referendum on the ballot a few months prior.

Since her re-election, Kelly saw a continued rise in personal popularity, and as of 2024 ranks among the ten most popular governors in the country, which some commentators attributed to her frequent use of her veto powers and extensive travel across the state.

While Democratic candidates have remained competitive at the gubernatorial level, winning most of the elections, the Republican Party historically dominated Kansas in federal and legislative politics. After the 2024 elections, Republicans maintained their 3–1 majority in Kansas's U.S. House delegation. Kansas had been represented in the U.S. Senate exclusively by Republicans from 1939 until Adam Hamilton's victory in the concurrent election in 2026. Both chambers of the Kansas Legislature also had Republican supermajorities. Since 1957, neither major political party has held the Kansas governor's office for longer than two consecutive terms, reflecting the ongoing competitiveness of the state's executive elections.

== Democratic primary ==
=== Candidates ===
==== Nominee ====
- Cindy Holscher, state senator from the 8th district (2021–present)
  - Running mate: KC Ohaebosim, state representative from the 89th district (2017–present)

==== Eliminated in primary ====
- Ethan Corson, state senator from the 7th district (2021–present)
  - Running mate: Renee Duxler, president and CEO of the Salina Area Chamber of Commerce (2023–present)
- Curt Skoog, mayor of Overland Park (2021–present)
  - Running mate: Jennifer Bacani McKenny, physician

==== Withdrawn ====
- Marty Tuley, teacher (failed to find running mate)

==== Declined ====
- Matt All, president and CEO of Blue Cross Blue Shield of Kansas (2018–present)
- Dinah Sykes, minority leader of the Kansas Senate (2021–present) (running for insurance commissioner)
- David Toland, lieutenant governor of Kansas (2021–present) (endorsed Corson)

=== Endorsements ===
Ethan Corson

Executive branch officials

- Kathleen Sebelius, former secretary of health and human services (2009–2014)

Statewide officials

- Laura Kelly, governor of Kansas (2019–present)
- David Toland, lieutenant governor of Kansas (2021–present) and secretary of commerce of Kansas (2019–present)

Organizations

- End Citizens United
- Planned Parenthood Great Plains
Cindy Holscher

Statewide officials

- John Carlin, former governor of Kansas (1979–1987)
- Lynn Rogers, former state treasurer of Kansas (2021–2023)

Newspapers

- The Kansas City Star (Democratic primary only)
Declined to endorse

Labor unions

- Kansas National Education Association

=== Polling ===
Poll source	Date(s) administered	Sample size (Note: Key: A – all adults RV – registered voters LV – likely voters V – unclear)	Margin of error	Ethan Corson	Cindy Holscher	Curt Skoog	Other	Undecided
Change Research (D) (Note: Poll commissioned by Civic Clarity)	June 11–15, 2026	1,022 (LV)	± 3.0%	10%	37%	7%	2% (Note: "Would not vote" with 2%)	44%
Public Policy Polling (D) (Note: Poll sponsored by Holscher's campaign)	January 8–9, 2026	699 (V)	–	9%	33%	—	—	58%

=== Results ===
Primary results by county: Holscher: 30–40%; 40–50%; 50–60%; 60–70%; Corson: 40–50%; 50–60%; 60–70%; Skoog: 40–50%; 50–60%; Tie: 40–50%

Democratic primary results
Party	Candidate	Votes	%
Democratic	Cindy Holscher KC Ohaebosim	108,478	48.6
Democratic	Ethan Corson Renee Duxler	86,623	38.8
Democratic	Curt Skoog Jennifer Bacani McKenny	28,024	12.6
Total votes		223,125	100.0

== Republican primary ==
=== Candidates ===
==== Nominee ====
- Ty Masterson, president of the Kansas Senate (2021–present) from the 16th district (2009–present)
  - Running mate: Jeff Klemp, state senator from the 5th district (2025–present)

==== Eliminated in primary ====
- Charlotte O'Hara, former Johnson County commissioner (2021–2025) and former state representative from the 17th district (2011–2013)
  - Running mate: Michelle Dombrosky, member of the Kansas State Board of Education
- Nick Reinecker, restaurant manager and husband of Katy Reinecker
  - Running mate: Katy Reinecker, restaurant manager and wife of Nick Reinecker
- Stacy Rogers, consignment sale business owner
  - Running mate: Michael Smith, former mayor of Lansing
- Philip Sarnecki, financial services executive
  - Running mate: Joy Eakins, former Wichita Schools board member (2013–2018)
- Vicki Schmidt, Kansas insurance commissioner (2019–present)
  - Running mate: Joe Newland, president of the Kansas Farm Bureau (2022–present)
- Scott Schwab, Kansas secretary of state (2019–present)
  - Running mate: Ken Rahjes, state representative from the 110th district (2016–present) (previously ran for secretary of state)

==== Withdrawn ====
- Jeff Colyer, former governor (2018–2019) (endorsed Masterson)
- Joy Eakins, former Wichita Schools board member (2013–2018) (unsuccessfully ran for lieutenant governor with Sarnecki)

==== Declined ====
- Ron Estes, U.S. representatives from KS-04 (2017–present)
- Jake LaTurner, U.S. representatives from KS-02 (2021–2025)
- Dayton Moore, former Kansas City Royals executive (2006–2022)
- Ken Rahjes, state representative from the 110th district (2016–present)
- Jon Rolph, member of the Kansas Board of Regents (2019–present)

=== Endorsements ===
Ty Masterson

Executive branch officials

- Donald Trump, president of the United States (2017–2021, 2025–present)

U.S. senators

- Roger Marshall, Kansas (2021–present)

Statewide officials

- Jeff Colyer, 47th governor of Kansas (2018–2019) and former candidate for this seat

Labor unions

- Kansas State Council of Fire Fighters

Organizations

- Americans for Prosperity
- NRA Political Victory Fund
Philip Sarnecki

State legislators

- Mark Steffen, former SD-34 (2021–2025) (previously endorsed Colyer)
Vicki Schmidt

Organizations

- Maggie's List

Newspapers

- The Kansas City Star (Republican primary only)
Doug Billings (withdrawn)

Executive branch officials

- Michael Flynn, former national security advisor (2017)

Individuals

- Ryan Fournier, cofounder of Students for Trump
- Chad Prather, political commentator
Jeff Colyer (withdrawn)

Executive branch officials

- Ben Carson, former secretary of housing and urban development (2017–2021)

State legislators

- Susan Estes, HD-87 (2021–present)

=== Results ===
Primary results by county: Masterson: 20–30%; 30–40%; 40–50%; 50–60%; 60–70%; Sarnecki: 30–40%; 40–50%; 50–60%; Schwab: 40–50%; Tie: 30–40%

Republican primary results
Party	Candidate	Votes	%
Republican	Ty Masterson Jeff Klemp	147,213	43.2
Republican	Philip Sarnecki Joy Eakins	76,292	22.4
Republican	Vicki Schmidt Joe Newland	46,693	13.7
Republican	Scott Schwab Ken Rahjes	37,318	10.9
Republican	Charlotte O'Hara Michelle Dombrosky	14,493	4.3
Republican	Stacy Rogers Michael Smith	11,789	3.5
Republican	Nick Reinecker Katy Reinecker	7,122	2.1
Total votes		340,920	100.0

== General election ==
=== Post-primary endorsements ===
Cindy Holscher (D)

Statewide officials

- Laura Kelly, governor of Kansas (2019–present)
- Kathleen Sebelius, former governor of Kansas (2003–2009) and former HHS Secretary (2009–2014)

Labor unions

- Kansas AFL-CIO
- United Auto Workers

Organizations

- EMILYs List
Ty Masterson (R)

Labor unions

- International Brotherhood of Electrical Workers Local 124
- SMART-TD

=== Predictions ===
Source	Ranking	As of
The Cook Political Report	Tossup	October 29, 2026
Decision Desk HQ	Lean R (flip)	November 3, 2026
Fox News	Lean R (flip)	November 1, 2026
Inside Elections	Tilt R (flip)	October 29, 2026
NBC News	Lean R (flip)	November 3, 2026
RealClearPolitics	Tossup	November 1, 2026
Sabato's Crystal Ball	Lean R (flip)	November 2, 2026
Silver Bulletin	Tossup	November 3, 2026

=== Polling ===
Aggregate polls

Source of poll aggregation	Dates administered	Dates updated	Cindy Holscher (D)	Ty Masterson (R)	Other/ Undecided (Note: Calculated by taking the difference of 100% and all other candidates combined.)	Margin
270toWin	October 29 – November 1, 2026	November 2, 2026	47.8%	48.4%	3.8%	Masterson +0.6%
Decision Desk HQ	through November 1, 2026	November 2, 2026	47.4%	48.1%	4.5%	Masterson +0.7%
FiftyPlusOne	through November 1, 2026	November 2, 2026	47.4%	48.7%	3.9%	Masterson +1.3%
RealClearPolitics	September 8 – November 1, 2026	November 1, 2026	47.0%	48.8%	4.2%	Masterson +1.8%
Silver Bulletin	through November 1, 2026	November 2, 2026	47.8%	49.0%	3.2%	Masterson +1.2%
Average			47.4%	48.6%	4.0%	Masterson +1.2%

Poll source	Date(s) administered	Sample size	Margin of error	Cindy Holscher (D)	Ty Masterson (R)	Other	Undecided
AtlasIntel	October 28 – November 1, 2026	2,038 (LV)	± 2.0%	50%	46%	3% (Note: "Would not vote" with 2%; "Other" with 1%)	1%
Survey 160	October 27 – November 1, 2026	1,267 (LV)	± 3.6%	49% (Note: With voters who lean toward a given candidate)	48%	2%	1%
Survey 160	October 27 – November 1, 2026	1,267 (LV)	± 3.6%	49%	47%	2%	2%
Survey 160	October 27 – November 1, 2026	1,339 (RV)	± 3.6%	49%	47%	2%	2%
Survey 160	October 27 – November 1, 2026	1,339 (RV)	± 3.6%	48%	47%	2%	4%
New York Times/Siena University	October 27 – November 1, 2026	736 (LV)	± 4.4%	48%	47%	0%	5%
YouGov	October 26–29, 2026	2,092 (LV)	± 2.8%	49%	50%	0%	0%
Emerson College	October 26–28, 2026	800 (LV)	± 3.5%	48%	53%	—	—
Emerson College	October 26–28, 2026	800 (LV)	± 3.5%	46%	50%	—	4%
The Washington Post/SSPG	October 22–26, 2026	801 (LV)	± 3.9%	51%	45%	3% (Note: "Would not vote" with 2%)	1%
SSRS (Note: Poll conducted for CNN)	October 20–26, 2026	838 (LV)	± 4.5%	45%	50%	5% (Note: "Neither" with 4%)	0%
Global Strategy Group (D)	October 18–21, 2026	600 (LV)	± 4.0%	47%	47%	—	6%
YouGov	September 24 – October 4, 2026	2,255 (LV)	± 3.2%	44%	47%	—	7%
New York Times/Siena University	September 22–30, 2026	605 (LV)	± 2.1%	44%	49%	—	7%
Emerson College (Note: Poll sponsored by Nexstar Media Group)	September 15–16, 2026	750 (LV)	± 3.6%	44%	51%	—	6%
Global Strategy Group (D) (Note: Poll sponsored by the Democratic Attorneys General Association)	September 13–16, 2026	800 (LV)	± 3.5%	49%	46%	—	5%
co/efficient (R)	September 8–10, 2026	915 (LV)	± 3.2%	43%	51%	—	6%
Global Strategy Group (D)	August 13–16, 2026	600 (LV)	± 4.0%	47%	46%	—	7%

=== Results ===
2026 Kansas gubernatorial election
Party	Candidate	Votes	%	±%
Democratic	Cindy Holscher; KC Ohaebosim	562,012	50.51	
Republican	Ty Masterson; Jeff Klemp	550,643	49.49	
Total votes		1,112,655	100.0	
Democratic hold				

==== Counties that flipped from Republican to Democratic ====
- Finney (largest municipality: Garden City)
- Seward (largest municipality: Liberal)

==== By congressional district ====
Despite losing statewide, Masterson won three congressional districts, while Holscher won one.

District	Holscher	Masterson	Representative
1st	42.79%	57.21%	Tracey Mann
2nd	48.57%	51.43%	Derek Schmidt
3rd	59.74%	40.26%	Sharice Davids
4th	47.26%	52.74%	Ron Estes

== Analysis ==
This was the first gubernatorial election since 2006 that a Democrat won over 50% of the vote statewide. This was also the first time that Kansas elected a governor of the same party as the outgoing governor since 1964, and the first time the Democrats accomplished this.

=== Exit poll ===
2026 Kansas gubernatorial election (CNN)
Demographic subgroup	Holscher	Masterson	% of total vote
Ideology
Liberals	99	1	21
Moderates	70	30	38
Conservatives	8	92	41
Party
Democrats	98	2	25
Republicans	11	89	42
Independents	64	36	33
Donald Trump job approval
Approve	2	98	42
Disapprove	86	14	58
2024 presidential vote
Kamala Harris	99	1	42
Donald Trump	8	92	52
Did not vote	74	26	4
Gender
Men	46	54	49
Women	53	47	50
Income
$100,000 or more	54	46	35
$50,000-$99,999	48	52	34
Less than $50,000	48	52	31
White born-again or evangelical Christian?
Yes	17	83	30
No	64	36	70
Race by gender
White men	44	56	42
White women	50	50	43
All other voters	65	35	14
Age
18–29 years old	78	22	8
30–44 years old	52	48	18
45–64 years old	46	54	34
65 and older	47	53	40
Area type
Urban	70	30	13
Suburban	58	42	40
Rural	38	62	47
Education
College graduate	58	42	45
No college degree	44	56	55
Education by race
White college graduates	56	44	40
Whites without college	40	60	46
Non-whites	60	40	15
Education by gender and race
White women with college degrees	59	41	21
White women without college degrees	42	58	22
White men with college degrees	51	49	19
White men without college degrees	39	61	23
Voters of color	66	34	15
Educational attainment
Advanced degree	61	39	20
Bachelor's degree	56	44	24
Associate's degree	50	50	11
Some college	34	66	22
Never attended college	51	49	22

== See also ==
- Elections in Kansas
- Political party strength in Kansas
- Kansas Democratic Party
- Kansas Republican Party
- Government of Kansas
- 2026 United States Senate election in Kansas
- 2026 Kansas elections
- 2026 United States gubernatorial elections
- 2026 United States elections

== Notes ==
Partisan clients
