= Mike Dodson =

American politician

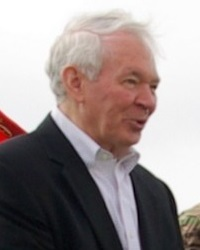

Member of the Kansas House of Representatives from the 67th district
- In office January 11, 2021 – January 13, 2025
- Preceded by: Tom Phillips
- Succeeded by: Angelina Roeser

Personal details
- Born: Michael Lee Dodson; November 16, 1945 (age 80) Oklahoma City, Oklahoma, U.S.
- Party: Republican
- Spouse: Diane W. Dodson
- Education: Kansas State University (M.S.); National War College (diploma); Massachusetts Institute of Technology (certificate); Center for Creative Leadership (certificate); United States Army Command and General Staff College (diploma); Field Artillery Officer Advanced Course (diploma)
- Profession: construction consultant

Military service
- Allegiance: United States
- Branch/service: United States Army
- Rank: Lieutenant General
- Commands: Stabilisation Force in Bosnia and Herzegovina; Fort Riley, Kansas; III Corps Artillery; 1st Infantry Division Artillery; 3rd Battalion, 16th FA; C Battery, 2nd Bn, 1st FA
- Battles/wars: Vietnam War; Gulf War

Michael Lee Dodson (born November 16, 1945) is an American politician who served as a Republican member of the Kansas House of Representatives, representing the 67th district from 2021 to 2025.

Dodson was elected to two full terms in the Kansas House of Representatives, defeating Democrats Cheryl Arthur and Kim Zito in 2020 and 2022 respectively.

Dodson is a general manager for Bechtel, the largest construction company in the United States. He is a retired United States Army lieutenant general and had previous political experience as a city commissioner and mayor of Manhattan, Kansas (2015–2018). On May 23, 2024, Dodson announced he would not seek re-election to the Kansas House.

== Committee membership ==
Dodson serves on four legislative committees in 2024:

- Elections
- Commerce, Labor and Economic Development
- Insurance
- Financial Institutions and Pensions

== Early life and education ==
Michael Lee Dodson was born in Oklahoma City, Oklahoma, where his mother was staying with his aunt's family while his father was serving as a bomber pilot with the Army Air Forces. After his father was discharged from World War II service, they moved back to Colville, Washington. Dodson graduated from Colville High School and then enrolled at the University of Washington. He enlisted in the Army during the Vietnam War and was commissioned as a field artillery officer in 1968. Dodson later earned an M.S. degree in operations research and systems analysis from Kansas State University. He is also a graduate of the Army Command and General Staff College and the National War College.

== Military career ==
Dodson received fixed-wing and rotary flight training at Fort Rucker in Alabama. He was deployed to Vietnam twice, first with the 334th Armored Helicopter Company and then with the 2nd Battalion, 20th Aerial Rocket Artillery, 1st Cavalry Division.

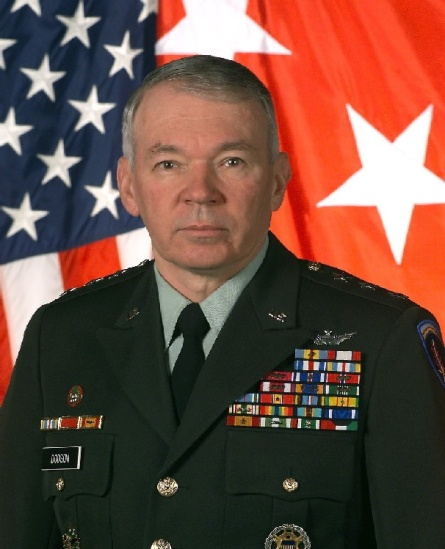
Dodson as a Lieutenant General

In peacetime, Dodson commanded C Battery, 2nd Battalion, 1st Field Artillery Regiment and then 3rd Battalion, 16th Field Artillery Regiment in Baumholder, West Germany. During Operation Desert Storm, he commanded the 1st Infantry Division Artillery. Dodson later served as commanding general of the III Corps Artillery at Fort Sill in Oklahoma and then of Fort Riley in Kansas.

As a lieutenant general, he served as commander of the Stabilisation Force in Bosnia and Herzegovina from September 8, 2000, to September 7, 2001, and then as deputy commander of U.S. Army Europe and the Seventh Army from September 17, 2001, to November 4, 2003.

Dodson's military decorations include two Defense Distinguished Service Medals, two Army Distinguished Service Medals, a Silver Star Medal, a Defense Superior Service Medal, four awards of the Legion of Merit, two Distinguished Flying Crosses, four Bronze Star Medals, four Meritorious Service Medals and forty-five Air Medals.

== Personal ==
Dodson is the son of Tom Dodson and Shirley Elizabeth (Wylie) Dodson (January 12, 1925 – September 19, 2014). They were married on January 12, 1945, in Pullman, Washington. Dodson has a brother and a sister.

Dodson is married to Diane Dodson and they have three adult children.

== See also ==
- List of mayors of Manhattan, Kansas
