= List of mayors of Manhattan, Kansas =

Manhattan, Kansas mayors

The following is a list of mayors of the city of Manhattan, Kansas, United States of America.

== List of mayors ==
- A.J. Mead, c.1857
- Elisha Madison Thurston, c.1858-1859
- Robert Bruce Spilman, c.1870
- Thomas Hunter, c.1894
- A.M. Story, c.1899
- George T. Fielding, c.1904
- John J. Paddock, 1908
- S.F. Goheen, c.1916-1917
- J.C. Barber, c.1922
- Clarence Johnson, 1925-1928
- Harold Westgate, c.1935
- Z.R. Hook, 1951-1952
- Richard Dean Rogers, 1952-1953
- Harold Howe, 1953-1954
- Ray P. Martin, 1954–1955, 1959-1960
- N.D. Harwood, 1955-1956
- Charles Arthur, 1956-1957
- Ray H. Pollom, 1957-1958
- L.E. Conrad, 1958-1959
- Cecil D. Hunter, 1960-1961
- Lowell E. Jack, 1961-1962
- Emil C. Fischer, 1962-1963
- Forest D. Campbell, 1963-1964
- Richard D. Rogers, 1964-1965
- Mrs. William C. Tremmel, 1965-1966
- Holly C. Fryer, 1966-1967
- John F. Stites, 1967-1968
- A.W. “Art” Torluemke, 1968-1969
- Barbara C. Yeo, 1969-1970
- William O. Rehschuh, 1970-1971
- Robert D. Linder, 1971–1972, 1978-1979
- Murt Hanks, 1972–1973, 1975-1976
- James N. Akin, 1973-1974
- T. Russell Reitz, 1974–1975, 1977–1978, 1981-1982
- Dean Coughenour, 1976-1977
- Terrance L. Glasscock, 1979-1980
- Edward F. Horne, 1980-1981
- Eugene A. Klingler, 1982–1983, 1987–1988, 1981-1992
- Wanda L. Fateley, 1983-1984
- David J. Fiser, 1984–1985, 1988-1989
- Suzanne Lindamood, 1985-1986
- J. Eric “Rick” Mann, 1986-1987
- Kent Glasscock, 1989-1990
- Richard B. Hayter, 1990-1991
- Richard Seidler, 1992-1993
- Roger Maughmer, 1993-1994
- Helen G. Cooper, 1994-1995
- Edith Stunkel, 1995-1996
- Sydney Carlin, 1996-1997
- Bruce Snead, 1997–1998, 2001–2002, 2006–2007, 2010-2011
- Steve Hall, 1998-1999
- Roger Reitz, 1999-2000
- Ed Klimek, 2002–2003, 2005-2006
- Mark Taussig, 2003-2004
- Brad Everett, 2004-2005
- Tom Phillips, 2007-2008
- Mark J. Hatesohl, 2008–2009, 2023
- Bob Strawn, 2009-2010
- James E. Sherow, 2011-2012
- Loren J. Pepperd, 2012-2013
- John E. Matta, 2013-2014
- Winfried W. P. Butler, 2014–2015, 2021, 2024
- Karen McCulloh, c.2015
- Usha Reddi, 2016–2017, 2020
- Linda Morse, 2017–2018, 2022
- Michael L. Dodson, 2018-2020
- Susan E. Adamchak, 2024–present

== See also ==
- Manhattan history
