= Trevor Jacobs (politician) =

American politician

Member of the Kansas House of Representatives from the 4th district
- In office January 9, 2017 – January 13, 2025
- Preceded by: Marty Read
- Succeeded by: Rick James

Personal details
- Born: July 25, 1976 (age 49)
- Party: Republican

Trevor Jacobs (born July 25, 1976) is an American politician and rancher who served as a Republican member of the Kansas House of Representatives from the 4th district from 2017 to 2025. He has a Bible outreach ministry with Jesus Saves Ministry and preaches on the radio and elsewhere. He has been described as a far-right conservative, having introduced a bill that would ban abortions in Kansas, criminalizing it with the same penalty as murder. He did not seek re-election in 2024.
