= Angelina Roeser =

American politician

Member of the Kansas House of Representatives from the 67th district
- Incumbent
- Assumed office January 13, 2025
- Preceded by: Mike Dodson

Personal details
- Born: Angelina Tran Sacramento, California
- Party: Republican
- Spouse: Joshua Roeser (m. 2024; div. 2025)
- Education: Kansas State University (graduated 2024)
- Profession: Business Development Strategist
- Website: angelroeserkansas.com

Angelina "Angel" Roeser (née Tran) is an American politician from Kansas that currently represents the 67th district of the Kansas House of Representatives since 2024 as a Republican.

== Biography ==
Angelina "Angel" Roeser was born in Sacramento, California, to Vietnamese immigrants. By the age of 3 her parents had separated and her mother, who was frequently moving around the country while also fighting illness, neglected both Angelina and her younger sister until they were ultimately taken by child protective services while they were living in Lincoln, Nebraska. In 2011 Roeser was placed under the guardianship of the Buresh family and graduated from Lincoln High School with honors before attending Kansas State University. While working on her B.S. in Human Development and Family Sciences she became involved in local civic engagement projects. During the COVID-19 pandemic Roeser worked in retail, and in 2022 she transitioned to commercial banking and then as a business development strategist.

=== Kansas state house ===
In 2024 Roeser ran for the 67th district of the Kansas House of Representatives as a Republican, seeking to replace the retiring Mike Dodson running on an anti-bossism platform. She was challenged in the primaries by Kaleb James, a member of the Riley County Law Enforcement Agency Board who ran on lowering taxes. Roeser narrowly defeated James with 643 votes to his 615 to face off against Democrat Kim Zito, who sought the Democratic nomination unopposed.

Zito, who was also the Democratic nominee in 2022, was widely condemned for her use of racial slurs in a Facebook post where she claimed to be quoting a heckler at a pro-Kamala Harris party shortly after the 2020 election. Zito responded by calling Roeser a "fundamentally flawed candidate who has a broken relationship with the truth", pointing out campaign material which incorrectly identified her as a Kansas State University graduate. Roeser narrowly defeated Zito with 5,704 votes to Zito's 5,175.

In May 2026, Roeser announced that she would not seek reelection when her current term ends on January 11, 2027. She had faced criticism from fellow Republicans for voting against legislatively referring the 2026 Kansas Elections for Supreme Court Justices Amendment to voters, which would have changed the way Kansas Supreme Court justices are selected and was ultimately rejected by a 20-point margin in August 2026.

== Personal life ==
In 2025, Roeser divorced her then-husband Joshua Roeser, whom she had married in 2024. Although she legally changed her surname back to Tran with their divorce decree, she continues to use her former surname professionally.
