= Rick James (politician) =

American politician

Member of the Kansas House of Representatives from the 4th district
- Incumbent
- Assumed office January 13, 2025
- Preceded by: Trevor Jacobs

Personal details
- Party: Republican
- Spouse: Allyson V. James

Rick “Ricky” James is an American politician is a Republican member of the Kansas House of Representatives from the 4th district, starting in 2025.

== Early life and career ==
James was raised in La Cygne, Kansas, attending the local elementary school. He graduated from Prairie View High School in La Cygne in 1981. After graduating, James enlisted in the Marines, serving for 30 years and retiring in 2011. He participated in the Gulf War, Operation Uphold Democracy, the Iraq War, served on an embassy, and was also a Marine Drill instructor. James attained the rank of Sergeant Major and was awarded the Bronze Star Medal and Legion of Merit. He also obtained a bachelor's and a master's degree from the American Military University. After retiring, James started an auction business and a real estate business.

== Political career ==
In 2014, James ran for the Linn County Commission’s first district. He was reelected, serving 2 terms, but did not seek reelection in 2022. He was elected to the 4th House of Representatives district in the 2024 Kansas House of Representatives election.

== Political positions ==
James is a self described Conservative Republican and is against solar energy, abortion, and tax increases. He supports the second amendment and Term limits, citing term limits as a factor in his choice to not seek reelection to the county commission.

== Electoral history ==
In 2014, James was elected to the Linn County commission and reelected in 2018.

James ran in the 2016 house Republican primary, but lost to Trevor Jacobs.

=== 2024 ===
2024 Kansas House of Representatives District 4 Republican primary election
Party	Candidate	Votes	%
Republican	Rick James	2,258	57.37%
Republican	Joshua Jones	1,678	42.63%
Total votes		3,936	100%

2024 Kansas House of Representatives District 4 general election
Party	Candidate	Votes	%
Republican	Rick James	9,500	100%
Total votes		9,500	100%
Republican hold			
