= Annie Kuether =

American politician

Member of the Kansas House of Representatives from the 55th district
- In office January 13, 1997 – January 9, 2023
- Preceded by: Jill Grant
- Succeeded by: Tobias Schlingensiepen

Personal details
- Born: March 20, 1952 (age 74) St. Louis, MO, U.S.
- Party: Democratic

Annie Kuether (born March 20, 1952) is an American politician who served as a Democratic member of the Kansas House of Representatives, representing the 55th district from 1997 to 2023.

== Committee membership ==
- Energy and Utilities (Ranking Member)
- Judiciary

== Major donors ==
The top 5 donors to Kuether's 2008 campaign:

- 1. Kansans for Lifesaving Cures $1,000
- 2. Golden Belt Telephone Assoc $1,000
- 3. Kansas Contractors Assoc $1,000
- 4. Kansas City Power and Light $1,000
- 5. Kansas National Education Assoc $1,000
