= Mary Martha Good =

American politician

Member of the Kansas House of Representatives from the 75th district
- In office January 9, 2017 – January 14, 2019
- Preceded by: Will Carpenter
- Succeeded by: Will Carpenter

Personal details
- Born: December 14, 1954 (age 71)
- Party: Republican

Mary Martha Good (born December 14, 1954) is an American politician who served in the Kansas House of Representatives for the 75th district from 2017 to 2019.

In November 2019, she was elected to an at-large seat on the Board of Trustees of Butler County College.
