= Suzanne Wikle =

American politician

Member of the Kansas House of Representatives from the 11th district
- Incumbent
- Assumed office January 13, 2025
- Preceded by: Christina Haswood

Personal details
- Born: Kansas City, Missouri
- Party: Democratic
- Spouse: David Jordan

Suzanne Wikle is an American politician. She has served as a member of the Kansas House of Representatives since 2025.

== Personal life ==
Wikle is a United Methodist.

== Electoral history ==
=== 2024 ===
2024 Kansas House of Representatives District 10 Democratic primary election
Party	Candidate	Votes	%
Democratic	Suzanne Wikle	1,790	90.63%
Democratic	Zachary Thomas Hawkins	185	9.37%
Total votes		1,975	100%

2024 Kansas House of Representatives District 10 general election
Party	Candidate	Votes	%
Democratic	Suzanne Wikle	7,864	100%
Total votes		7,864	100%
Democratic hold			
