= Nathan Butler =

American politician

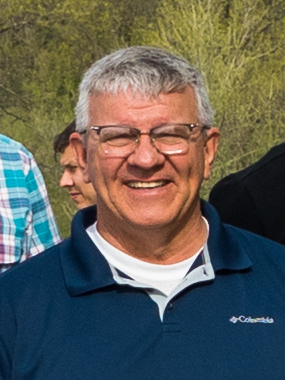
- Butler in 2023

Member of the Kansas House of Representatives from the 68th district
- Incumbent
- Assumed office January 9, 2023
- Preceded by: Dave Baker

Personal details
- Party: Republican

Nathan Butler is an American politician. He has served as a member of the Kansas House of Representatives since 2023, representing the 68th district. He is a member of the Republican Party.
