= Melissa Oropeza =

American politician

Member of the Kansas House of Representatives from the 37th district
- Incumbent
- Assumed office January 9, 2023
- Preceded by: Aaron Coleman

Personal details
- Born: Wyandotte County, Kansas, U.S.
- Party: Democratic
- Education: Kansas City Kansas Community College (AAS); University of Kansas (BSN, MSN); University of Missouri-Kansas City (DNP)
- Website: Campaign website

Melissa Oropeza is an American politician serving as a member of the Kansas House of Representatives from the 37th district. Her term began on January 9, 2023.

== Biography ==
Oropeza was born and raised in Wyandotte County, Kansas, and graduated from Turner High School. She attended Kansas City Kansas Community College and received her associate degree in nursing. She then attended the University of Kansas, where she received a Bachelor of Science in Nursing and a Master of Science in Nursing. She received her Doctor of Nursing Practice from the University of Missouri-Kansas City in 2020. Prior to entering politics, she worked as a registered nurse, a gastroenterology nurse practitioner, and as a member of the Kansas State Board of Nursing.

== Electoral history ==
Kansas House of Representatives 37th District 2022 Democratic Primary
Party	Candidate	Votes	%
Democratic	Melissa Oropeza	1,203	49.2%
Democratic	Faith Rivera	923	37.7%
Democratic	Aaron Coleman (incumbent)	321	13.1%
Total votes		1,203	100.00
