= Duane Droge =

American politician

Member of the Kansas House of Representatives from the 13th district
- Incumbent
- Assumed office January 9, 2023
- Preceded by: Joe Newland

Personal details
- Party: Republican

Duane Droge is an American politician. He has served as a member of the Kansas House of Representatives since 2023, representing the 13th district. He is a member of the Republican Party.
