= Kristey Williams =

American politician (born 1970)

Member of the Kansas House of Representatives from the 77th district
- Incumbent
- Assumed office January 12, 2015
- Preceded by: J. David Crum

Personal details
- Born: October 16, 1970 (age 55) Augusta, Kansas, U.S.
- Party: Republican
- Education: University of Kansas (BSEd, MSEd)
- Website: www.KristeyWilliamsHouse.com

Kristey Williams (born October 16, 1970) is an American politician who has served in the Kansas House of Representatives from the 77th district since 2015. She is a Republican.In 2026, Wiliams spoke in support of a Kansas House bill which would outlaw the teaching of "DEI," (Diversity, Equity and Inclusion) and "CRT," (Critical Race Theory) in Kansas universities.
