= Ron Bryce =

American politician

Member of the Kansas House of Representatives from the 11th district
- Incumbent
- Assumed office January 9, 2023
- Preceded by: Jim Kelly

Personal details
- Party: Republican
- Spouse: Lydia Bryce

Ron Bryce is an American politician. He has served as a member of the Kansas House of Representatives from the 11th district since 2023. He is a member of the Republican Party.
