= Susan Humphries =

American politician

Member of the Kansas House of Representatives from the 99th district
- Incumbent
- Assumed office January 9, 2017
- Preceded by: Dennis Hedke

Personal details
- Born: October 31, 1957 (age 68) Hot Springs, Arkansas, U.S.
- Party: Republican
- Spouse: Cary
- Children: 4
- Education: Texas Christian University; Sturm College of Law

Susan Humphries (born October 31, 1957) is an American politician who has served in the Kansas House of Representatives from the 99th district since 2017. The Butler County Times-Gazette article concerning the announcement of her candidacy says she is an attorney and describes her as a conservative. In 2026, Humphries spoke in support of a Kansas House bill which would outlaw the teaching of "DEI," (Diversity, Equity and Inclusion) and "CRT," (Critical Race Theory) in Kansas universities.
