= Rebecca Schmoe =

American politician

Member of the Kansas House of Representatives from the 59th district
- Incumbent
- Assumed office January 9, 2023
- Preceded by: Blaine Finch

Personal details
- Party: Republican

Rebecca Schmoe is an American politician serving as a member of the Kansas House of Representatives from the 59th district. Elected in November 2022, she assumed office on January 9, 2023.

== Biography ==
Schmoe has lived in Franklin County, the area she represents in the Kansas House, for over twenty years. Schmoe is a spokesperson for the organization 1 Million Moms Against Gun Control, and is the Kansas State Director for The DC Project. She is a Christian.
