= Susan Ruiz =

American politician

Member of the Kansas House of Representatives from the 23rd district
- Incumbent
- Assumed office January 15, 2019
- Preceded by: Linda Gallagher

Personal details
- Party: Democratic
- Education: Our Lady of the Lake University (BSW, MSW)
- Website: www.susanruizforkansas.com

Susan Ruiz is an American politician, who was elected to the Kansas House of Representatives in the 2018 elections. She represents the 23rd House District as a member of the Democratic Party.

Openly lesbian, she was elected alongside Brandon Woodard as the state's first-ever LGBT state legislators.

2019-2020 Kansas House of Representatives Committee Assignments

- Social Services Budget
- Veterans and Military
- Children and Seniors
