= Tobias Schlingensiepen =

American politician

Member of the Kansas House of Representatives from the 55th district
- Incumbent
- Assumed office January 9, 2023
- Preceded by: Annie Kuether

Personal details
- Born: November 24, 1963 (age 62) Berlin, Germany
- Party: Democratic

Tobias Schlingensiepen (born November 24, 1963) is a Democratic member of the Kansas House of Representatives, representing the 55th district since 2023. Schlingensiepen was elected in the 2022 general election following the retirement of Democratic incumbent representative Annie Kuether.

== Committee membership ==
- Energy, Utilities and Telecommunications
- Agriculture and Natural Resources
- Ranking Member, Corrections and Juvenile Justice
