= Lynn Melton =

American politician

Member of the Kansas House of Representatives from the 36th district
- Incumbent
- Assumed office January 9, 2023
- Preceded by: Kathy Wolfe Moore

Personal details
- Party: Democratic
- Spouse: John Melton

Lynn Melton is an American Democratic member of the Kansas House of Representatives, representing the 36th district. She has served since 2023, winning the seat in the 2022 Kansas House of Representatives election against the Republican nominee Kevin Braun.

== Biography ==
Melton graduated from Turner High School.
