= Sandy Pickert =

American politician

Member of the Kansas House of Representatives from the 88th district
- Incumbent
- Assumed office January 9, 2023
- Preceded by: Chuck Schmidt

Personal details
- Party: Republican
- Occupation: Retired Nurse

Sandy Pickert is an American politician and former nurse serving as a member of the Kansas House of Representatives from the 88th district. She assumed office on January 9, 2023.

== Biography ==
Pickert was a nurse for 49 years before retiring. For the 2024 United States presidential election, she endorsed Ron DeSantis.
