= Steven Howe =

American politician

Member of the Kansas House of Representatives from the 71st district
- Incumbent
- Assumed office January 11, 2021
- Preceded by: Diana Dierks

Personal details
- Party: Republican
- Education: Kansas State University (BS)

Steven K. Howe is an American businessman and politician serving as a member of the Kansas House of Representatives from the 71st district. Elected in November 2020, he assumed office on January 11, 2021.

== Education ==
Howe earned a Bachelor of Science degree in speech communication and rhetoric from Kansas State University.

== Career ==
From 2003 to 2010, Howe served in the office of Congressman Jerry Moran, first as a legislative correspondent and later as district representative. He joined the staff of Congressman Tim Huelskamp in 2011, serving as deputy district director until 2012 and as district director from 2012 to 2017. Howe also co-owns the Tamara Howe School of Dance with his wife. Howe was elected to the Kansas House of Representatives in November 2020 and assumed office on January 11, 2021.
