= Daniel Hawkins (politician) =

American politician

Dan Hawkins

Kansas Insurance Comissioner-elect
- Assuming office January 11, 2027
- Governor: Cindy Holscher (elect)
- Succeeding: Vicki Schmidt

Speaker of the Kansas House of Representatives
- Incumbent
- Assumed office January 9, 2023
- Preceded by: Ron Ryckman Jr.

Majority Leader of the Kansas House of Representatives
- In office January 14, 2019 – January 9, 2023
- Preceded by: Don Hineman
- Succeeded by: Chris Croft

Member of the Kansas House of Representatives from the 100th district
- Incumbent
- Assumed office January 14, 2013
- Preceded by: Mario Goico

Personal details
- Born: November 1, 1960 (age 66)
- Party: Republican
- Spouse: Diane
- Children: 2
- Education: Hutchinson Community College (attended); Emporia State University (BS)

Daniel R. Hawkins (born November 1, 1960) is an American politician who is the Kansas Insurance Commissioner-elect. He has served as a Republican member for the 100th district in the Kansas House of Representatives since 2013. In 2017, the American Conservative Union gave him a lifetime rating of 78%. He has been the speaker of the Kansas House of Representatives since 2023.

Kansas House of Representatives
Preceded by Don Hineman	Majority Leader of the Kansas House of Representatives; 2019–2023	Succeeded by Chris Croft
Political offices
Preceded by Ron Ryckman Jr.	Speaker of the Kansas House of Representatives; 2023–present	Incumbent
