= Kyle McNorton =

American politician

Member of the Kansas House of Representatives from the 50th district
- Incumbent
- Assumed office October 24, 2023
- Preceded by: Fred Patton

Personal details
- Party: Republican

Kyle McNorton is an American politician. He has served as a member of the Kansas House of Representatives since 2023, representing the 50th district. He is a member of the Republican Party.
