= Carl Turner (politician) =

American politician

Member of the Kansas House of Representatives from the 28th district
- Incumbent
- Assumed office January 11, 2021
- Preceded by: Kellie Warren

Personal details
- Party: Republican
- Children: 1
- Education: University of Central Missouri (BS); Rockhurst University (MBA)

Carl Turner is an American politician serving as a member of the Kansas House of Representatives from the 28th district. Elected in November 2020, he assumed office on January 11, 2021.

== Education ==
Turner earned a Bachelor of Science degree in accounting from the University of Central Missouri and a Master of Business Administration in finance from Rockhurst University.

== Career ==
From 1996 to 2008, Turner worked as in various project manager and program director roles at Aquila, Inc. From 2008 to 2013, he was an IT project manager at the Kansas City Power and Light Company. From 2014 to 2016, he was a technical project manager at Genesis10. From 2016 to 2017, he was a financial and business analyst at the Midwest Consulting Group. From 2017 to 2020, he worked as a financial and business analyst at the Science Applications International Corporation. He was elected to the Kansas House of Representatives in November 2020 and assumed office on January 11, 2021.
