= Ronald Ellis (politician) =

American politician

Member of the Kansas House of Representatives from the 47th district
- Incumbent
- Assumed office January 9, 2017
- Preceded by: Ramon Gonzalez Jr.

Personal details
- Born: July 24, 1952 (age 74) Fredonia, Kansas, U.S.
- Party: Republican
- Spouse: Paula
- Profession: rancher

Ronald B. Ellis (born July 24, 1952) is an American politician. He has served as a Republican member for the 47th district in the Kansas House of Representatives since 2017.
