= David Buehler (politician) =

American politician

Member of the Kansas House of Representatives from the 40th district
- Incumbent
- Assumed office January 9, 2023
- Preceded by: David French

Personal details
- Party: Republican
- Education: University of Missouri-Kansas City (BBA); Webster University (MA)

David Buehler is an American politician. He has served as a member of the Kansas House of Representatives since 2023, representing the 40th district. He is a member of the Republican Party.
