= Chris Croft =

American politician

Majority Leader of the Kansas House of Representatives
- Incumbent
- Assumed office January 9, 2023
- Preceded by: Dan Hawkins

Member of the Kansas House of Representatives from the 8th district
- Incumbent
- Assumed office January 14, 2019
- Preceded by: Patty Markley

Personal details
- Party: Republican
- Spouse: Connie
- Children: 2
- Education: University of Florida (attended); Valencia College (AA); University of Central Florida (BS); United States Army Command and General Staff College (MA)
- Website: Campaign website

Military service
- Allegiance: United States
- Branch/service: United States Army
- Years of service: 1988–2018
- Rank: Colonel
- Commands: 725th Main Support Battalion; 101st Sustainment Brigade (Rear); 106th Transportation Battalion; 101st Airborne Division (Air Assault)
- Battles/wars: Iraq War
- Awards: See list

Christopher D. Croft Sr. is a retired United States Army colonel and American politician serving as a Republican member of the Kansas House of Representatives. He represents District 8, which includes the southwestern portion of the city of Overland Park, Kansas.

Croft is the chair of House Redistricting Committee and the vice chair of the House Insurance and Pensions Committee. Prior to his tenure in the Kansas House of Representatives, he served in the United States Army for thirty years and retired in 2018.

== Military career ==
Croft was commissioned as a second lieutenant after graduating from the University of Central Florida in 1987. His initial assignment was to the 28th Transportation Platoon and the 22nd Area Support group at Caserma Ederle in Vicenza, Italy. He was then assigned to Schofield Barracks, Hawaii, where he commanded Delta Company, 725th Main Support Battalion, 25th Infantry Division.

Upon graduating from Command and General Staff College in 2000 and the School of Advanced Military Studies in 2001, Croft served as Chief of Plans and Exercises and as a division transportation officer of the 4th Infantry Division at Fort Hood, Texas, and continued to serve in that role at Tikrit South Air Base, Iraq. Croft then became an operations officer to the 2d Brigade Combat Team in Baqubah, Iraq, and commanded both the 106th Transportation Battalion, 101st Airborne Division (Air Assault) and the 101st Sustainment Brigade (Rear) (Provisional) at Fort Campbell, Kentucky, and later in Balad, Iraq.

Following these assignments, Croft served as Chief of the Grade Logistics Branch for two years and one year as Chief of the Force Sustainment Division of the United States Army Human Resources Command. From 2013 to 2017, he was stationed at Fort Leavenworth, Kansas, where he served as executive director of the Center for Army Leadership. He retired from the U.S. Army as a colonel in January 2018.

== Political career ==
In the 2018 primary elections, Croft defeated incumbent Republican Patty Markley, 57.8% to 42.2%. After the general election later that year, he was elected to the Kansas House of Representatives.

In 2020 he was re-elected to the Kansas House of Representatives for a second term.

During the 2020, legislative session, Croft introduced legislation which would speed up and expand the process of granting occupational licenses to working professionals from other states. The legislation expedites the process of acquiring a Kansas occupational license if an individual holds an equivalent license in another state and seeks to continue their practice in Kansas. This was brought forth in effort to bring more jobs and fill current vacant positions available in Kansas.

== Personal life ==
Croft resides in Overland Park, Kansas, with his wife Connie. They have two children and six grandchildren.

== Awards and decorations ==
Legion of Merit
Bronze Star Medal with one oak leaf cluster
Defense Meritorious Service Medal
Meritorious Service Medal with four oak leaf clusters
Global War on Terrorism Expeditionary Medal
Iraqi Campaign Medal
Humanitarian Service Medal
Military Outstanding Volunteer Service Medal

Kansas House of Representatives
Preceded by Dan Hawkins	Majority Leader of the Kansas House of Representatives; 2023–present	Incumbent
