= Steve Huebert =

American politician

Member of the Kansas House of Representatives from the 90d
- Incumbent
- Assumed office January 25, 2025
- Preceded by: Carl Maughan
- In office January 8, 2001 – January 9, 2023
- Preceded by: Billie Vining
- Succeeded by: Carl Maughan

Personal details
- Born: April 5, 1959 (age 67) Wichita, Kansas, U.S.
- Party: Republican
- Spouse: Marsha
- Children: 3
- Education: Wichita State University

Steve Huebert (born April 5, 1959) is an American politician who has served as a Republican member of the Kansas House of Representatives, representing the 90th district. He served from 2001 to 2023, returning to the house in 2025. The American Conservative Union has given him a lifetime evaluation of 81%.

Huebert, who earned his BS from Wichita State University, has worked as an ergonomic analyst and systems engineer. His is married to Marsha and has three children, Sara, Allyson and Jake. From 1993 to 1995 he served on the Unified School District 262 School Board.
