= KC Ohaebosim =

American politician (born 1978)

Lieutenant Governor-elect of Kansas
- Assuming office January 11, 2027
- Governor: Cindy Holscher (elect)
- Succeeding: David Toland

Member of the Kansas House of Representatives from the 89th district
- Incumbent
- Assumed office January 9, 2017
- Preceded by: Roderick Houston
- Succeeded by: Carol Brewer (elect)

Personal details
- Born: Kelechi Ohaebosim; December 27, 1978 (age 47) Wichita, Kansas, U.S.
- Party: Democratic
- Education: Wichita State University (BS); Newman University (MBA)

Kelechi "KC" Ohaebosim (born December 27, 1978) is an American politician who is the lieutenant governor-elect of Kansas. He has served as a Democratic member for the 89th district in the Kansas House of Representatives since 2017. Ohaebosim's district comprises portions of Wichita, Kansas.

== Early life and education ==
Ohaebosim was born in Wichita, Kansas, the son of Nigeria-born Dr. Linus Ohaebosim. His father, who delivered over a thousand babies over a 41-year period, completed part of his residency in Kansas City before establishing his career in Wichita. KC Ohaebosim's mother is a registered nurse. He has four siblings.

KC Ohaebosim received his early education in Nigeria and later attended Wichita Heights High School. He earned a Bachelor of Science degree in information technology from Wichita State University. As a college student, he was a member of the Alpha Phi Alpha fraternity, an African-American fraternity. In 2005, he graduated with a master's degree in business administration from Newman University in Wichita.

== Career ==
=== Kansas State Senate ===
In 2008, Ohaebosim unsuccessfully ran for a seat in the Kansas Senate, losing the Democratic primary to Oletha Faust-Goudeau, who won with over 70% of the vote. Ohaebosim filed for a rematch against Faust-Goueau in the 2012 election. He lost the rematch by approximately 78.4% to 21.5%.

=== Kansas House of Representatives ===
He was elected to the Kansas House of Representatives in the 2016 election, replacing Roderick Houston. In 2017, he was among the legislators who voted to override Governor Sam Brownback's veto of a tax package designed to fix Kansas' budget shortfall. He was reelected in 2018 without opposition.

=== 2026 Kansas gubernatorial election ===
In May 2026, State Representative Cindy Holscher selected Ohaebosim as her running mate in the 2026 Kansas gubernatorial election. In August, Holscher placed first in the Democratic primary. She and Ohaebosim faced Ty Masterson and his running mate, Jeff Klemp, in the November general election.

Ohaebosim will become the first African-American official elected to statewide office in Kansas since Edward P. McCabe in the 1880s.

Party political offices
Preceded by David Toland	Democratic nominee for Lieutenant Governor of Kansas; 2026	Most recent
Political offices
Preceded by David Toland	Lieutenant Governor of Kansas; Taking office 2027	Elect
