= Mark Schreiber (Kansas politician) =

American politician

Member of the Kansas House of Representatives from the 60th district
- Incumbent
- Assumed office January 9, 2017
- Preceded by: Don Hill

Personal details
- Party: Republican
- Education: Emporia State University (BS, MS)

Mark Schreiber is an American politician serving as a member of the Kansas House of Representatives from the 60th district. Elected in November 2016, he assumed office on January 9, 2017.

Schreiber is a moderate Republican.

== Education ==
Schreiber earned a Bachelor of Science degree and Master of Science degree in biology from Emporia State University.

== Career ==
As a graduate student, Schreiber worked as a biologist at the Wolf Creek Generating Station. From 1979 to 2017, Schreiber worked for Westar Energy, retiring as the company's vice president for government affairs. In his role, Schreiber was tasked with lobbying members of the Kansas Legislature. Schreiber was elected to the Kansas House of Representatives in November 2016 and assumed office on January 9, 2017. Since 2019, he has also served as vice chair of the House Energy, Utilities, and Telecommunications Committee.

In 2025, Schreiber was the only Republican in the Kansas legislature to join Democrats in opposing a bill to ban gender-affirming care for minors.

He opposed Trump's push to convince Kansas to redistrict their congressional maps.
