= Fred Gardner (politician) =

American politician

Member of the Kansas House of Representatives from the 9th district
- Incumbent
- Assumed office January 9, 2023

Personal details
- Party: Republican
- Spouse: Jackie

Fred Gardner is an American politician. He is serving as a member of the Kansas House of Representatives from the 9th district. He is a member of the Republican Party.
