= Kirk Haskins =

American politician

Member of the Kansas House of Representatives from the 53rd district
- Incumbent
- Assumed office January 9, 2023
- Preceded by: Jim Gartner

Personal details
- Party: Democratic
- Education: Washburn University (BA); Wichita State University (MBA); University of Kansas (EdD)

Kirk Haskins is an American politician. He has served as a member of the Kansas House of Representatives since 2023, representing the 53rd district. He is a member of the Democratic Party.
