= Emil Bergquist =

American politician from Kansas (born 1955)

Member of the Kansas House of Representatives from the 91st district
- Incumbent
- Assumed office January 23, 2018
- Preceded by: Greg Lakin

Personal details
- Born: December 16, 1955 (age 70)
- Party: Republican
- Spouse: Ralene
- Children: 4

Emil Bergquist (born December 16, 1955) is an American politician serving as a member of the Kansas House of Representatives from the 91st district. He assumed office on January 23, 2018.

== Career ==
Prior to entering politics, Bergquist worked in the research and development department of Textron Aviation. For 15 years, Bergquist served as a member of the Park City City Council, including as mayor of the city. He retired in 2013, citing a desire to spend more time with his family. In 2018, Bergquist was selected by the Sedgwick County Republican precinct committee to succeed Greg Lakin in the Kansas House of Representatives. He assumed office on January 23, 2018.
