= Sydney Carlin (politician) =

American politician (born 1944)

Member of the Kansas House of Representatives from the 66th district
- Incumbent
- Assumed office January 13, 2003
- Preceded by: Jeff Peterson

Personal details
- Born: November 20, 1944 (age 81) Wichita, Kansas, U.S.
- Party: Democratic
- Spouse: John E. Carlin (deceased 2015)
- Children: 4
- Education: Kansas State University (B.S., 2000)

Sydney Lynn Carlin (born November 20, 1944) is a Democratic member of the Kansas House of Representatives, representing the 66th district. She has served since 2003. Carlin was not challenged for her seat in 2020, 2022, or 2024.

== Career ==
Carlin is a member of a number of community organizations, including the American Cancer Society, American Legion, Fraternal Order of Police, Habitat for Humanity, American Heart Association, and the Manhattan Arts Center. Prior to serving in the Kansas House, Carlin served on the Manhattan City Commission from 1993 to 1997, and served as mayor of Manhattan from 1996 to 1997.

She was originally elected to the Kansas House of Representatives in the 2002 Kansas elections, and is currently serving her twelfth consecutive term.

== Personal life ==
In 1975, Carlin married John Edward Carlin. John died in 2015 after battling cancer. Carlin has four children, Blaine, Becce, Ryan and Mike. Through her sister's marriage, Carlin is related to former Kansas State Senator Tom Hawk.

== See also ==
- List of mayors of Manhattan, Kansas
