= Mike Amyx =

Politician from Kansas, US

Member of the Kansas House of Representatives from the 45th district
- Incumbent
- Assumed office January 14, 2019
- Preceded by: Thomas Sloan

Personal details
- Party: Democratic
- Spouse: Marilyn Amyx

Mike Amyx is the incumbent member of the Kansas House of Representatives for the 45th district, which covers Northwestern Douglas County, including western Lawrence. He has served since 2019. He is a member of the Democratic Party. He had previously been the mayor of Lawrence for six terms, 1985–86, 1987–88, 2006–07, 2010–11, 2014–15, and 2015–17. He served a four-year term as a Douglas County Commissioner.

2019-2020 Kansas House committee assignments

- Local Government
- General Government Budget
- Higher Education Budget (2020)

== See also ==
- List of mayors of Lawrence, Kansas

Preceded by Tom Sloan	Kansas House of Representatives Representative from the 45th District; 2019 - Present	Succeeded by Incumbent
Preceded by Ernest Angino	Mayor of Lawrence, Kansas; 1985 - 1986	Succeeded by Sandy Praeger
Preceded by Sandy Praeger	Mayor of Lawrence, Kansas; 1987 - 1988	Succeeded by Robert J. Schumm
Preceded by Dennis Highberger	Mayor of Lawrence, Kansas; 2006 - 2007	Succeeded by Sue Hack
Preceded by Mike Dever	Mayor of Lawrence, Kansas; 2014 - 2015	Succeeded by Jeremy Farmer
Preceded by Jeremy Farmer	Mayor of Lawrence, Kansas; August 2015 - 2016	Succeeded by Leslie Soden
