= Robyn Essex =

American politician

Member of the Kansas House of Representatives from the 78th district
- Incumbent
- Assumed office January 9, 2023

Personal details
- Party: Republican
- Spouse: Steve Essex
- Children: 3
- Education: MidAmerica Nazarene University

Robyn Essex is an American politician who has served in the Kansas House of Representatives from the 78th district since January 9, 2023. In 2015, she ran for leadership in Olathe USD 233, but lost to Joe Beveridge.

== Biography ==
Essex has served on Olathe's Historic Preservation Board, its Planning Commission, and on the city council representing the first ward. She has worked under Federal Senator Jerry Moran.
