= Will Carpenter =

American politician and businessman

Member of the Kansas House of Representatives from the 75th district
- Incumbent
- Assumed office January 2019
- Preceded by: Mary Martha Good
- In office 2013–2017
- Preceded by: John Grange
- Succeeded by: Mary Martha Good

Personal details
- Born: July 4, 1956 (age 70) Hamilton, Kansas, U.S.
- Party: Republican
- Spouse: Ann
- Children: 3

Will Carpenter (born July 4, 1956) is an American politician and businessman serving as a member of the Kansas House of Representatives from the 75th district. Elected in November 2018, he assumed office in January 2019.

== Early life and education ==
Carpenter was born in Hamilton, Kansas, in 1956.

== Career ==
Outside of politics, Carpenter has owned several small businesses, including a car wash, market, and storage facility. He represented the 75th district in the Kansas House of Representatives from 2013 to 2017. In August 2016, Carpenter was defeated for re-election in the Republican primary. He was re-elected to his old seat in November 2018. Since 2019, he has served as chair of the House Social Services Budget Committee.
