= Susan Estes (politician) =

American politician

Member of the Kansas House of Representatives from the 87th district
- Incumbent
- Assumed office January 11, 2021
- Preceded by: Renee Erickson

Personal details
- Born: Susan Oliver
- Party: Republican
- Spouse: Ron Estes
- Children: 3
- Education: Florida Atlantic University (Bachelor of Arts)

Susan Oliver Estes is an American politician and former educator serving as a member of the Kansas House of Representatives from the 87th district. Elected in 2020, she assumed office on January 11, 2021.

== Education ==
Estes earned a Bachelor of Arts in Elementary education from Florida Atlantic University.

== Career ==
Prior to entering politics, Estes worked as a teacher. She was also the president of the Wichita Public Library Board and co-chair of the Metropolitan Area Planning Committee. Estes was elected to the Kansas House of Representatives in 2020, succeeding Renee Erickson.

Committee Assignments

- Appropriations
- Education
- K-12 Education Budget

== Personal life ==
Estes is married to the U.S. Congressman Ron Estes. They have three children and live in Wichita, Kansas.
