= Kansas House of Representatives =

Lower house of the government of Kansas

Coordinates: 39°02′54″N 95°40′41″W

- Kansas Legislature

Type
- Type: Lower house
- Term limits: None

History
- New session started: January 13, 2025

Leadership
- Speaker: Dan Hawkins (R) since January 9, 2023
- Speaker pro tempore: Blake Carpenter (R) since January 9, 2023
- Majority Leader: Chris Croft (R) since January 9, 2023
- Minority Leader: Brandon Woodard (D) since January 10, 2025

Structure
- Seats: 125
- Political groups: Republican (88); Democratic (37)
- Length of term: 2 years
- Authority: Article 2, Kansas Constitution
- Salary: $88.66/day + per diem

Elections
- Last election: November 3, 2026 (125 seats)
- Next election: November 7, 2028 (125 seats)
- Redistricting: Kansas Reapportionment Commission

Meeting place
- House of Representatives Chamber; Kansas State Capitol; Topeka, Kansas

Website
- Kansas House of Representatives

Rules
- Rules of the Kansas House of Representatives

The Kansas House of Representatives is the lower house of the legislature of the U.S. state of Kansas. Composed of 125 state representatives from districts with roughly equal populations of at least 19,000, its members are responsible for crafting and voting on legislation, helping to create a state budget, and legislative oversight over state agencies. Representatives are elected to two-year terms. The Kansas House of Representatives does not have term limits. The legislative session convenes at the Kansas State Capitol in Topeka annually.

== History ==
On January 29, 1861, President James Buchanan authorized Kansas to become the 34th state of United States, a free state. The ratification of the Kansas Constitution created the Kansas House of Representatives as the lower house of the state legislature.

Members of the Kansas House voted to impeach Governor Charles L. Robinson in 1862, but the impeachment trial did not lead to his conviction and removal of office. The Kansas Senate did vote to impeach the secretary of state and state auditor for the unlawful sale of bonds, but only three state senators voted for the governor's impeachment.

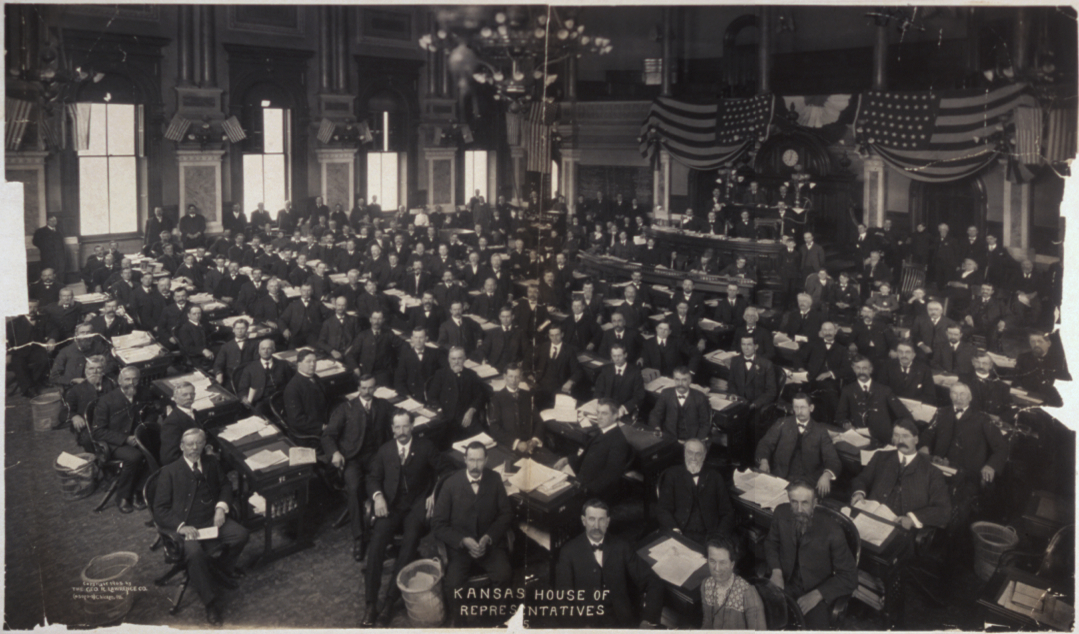
The Kansas House of Representatives in 1905

In 1870, the Kansas House of Representatives first met at the Kansas State Capitol, which was not officially completed until 1903.

Populists and Republicans both claimed control of the Kansas House of Representatives in 1893, with the Populists accusing the Republican Party of election fraud. The dispute led to separate Populist-led and Republican-led Houses in 1893 until the Kansas Supreme Court sided with the Republicans and the Populist-led House disbanded.

In 1888, Alfred B. Fairfax became the first African American elected to the House. He served as chairman of the House Committee on Immigration.

In 1918, Minnie J. Grinstead became the first female elected to the House.

In 1966, the state legislature began to hold annual general sessions and a constitutional amendment adopted at the 1974 general election extended the duration of the session held in the even-numbered years to 90 calendar days, subject to extension by a vote of two-thirds of the elected membership of each house.

United States presidential candidate Bob Dole, the 1996 Republican nominee, began his political career with a two-year term in the Kansas House of Representatives after his election in 1950.

== Legislative procedure ==
State representatives introduce a proposed law in the Kansas House of Representatives in the form of a bill, which must be approved by a standing committee, the Committee of the Whole and the entire membership of the chamber. Other state representatives can amend a bill in committee or on the floor of the chamber.

A bill must be approved by both houses of the Kansas Legislature in order to be submitted to the governor, who can sign it into law or veto the bill. State legislators can override the veto with the support of two-thirds majority of both houses.

== Party composition ==
Republicans have controlled the chamber for all but six years since statehood, and without interruption since 1993. The GOP presently holds a supermajority in the chamber. The following is the official make-up for the 2025–2026 session:

| Affiliation | Party (Shading indicates majority caucus) | | | Total | Vacant |
| Affiliation | Republican | Democratic | Independent | Total | Vacant |
|---|---|---|---|---|---|
| Begin 2021 | 86 | 38 | 1 | 125 | 0 |
| End 2022 | 86 | 39 | 0 | 125 | 0 |
| 2023–2024 | 85 | 40 | 0 | 125 | 0 |
| Begin 2025 | 88 | 37 | 0 | 125 | 0 |
| March 1, 2026 | 87 | 37 | 0 | 124 | 1 |
| Latest voting share | 70.2% | 29.8% | | | |

Map of current (2024) partisan composition of Kansas House of Representatives: Republican Party Democratic Party

== Leadership ==
The Speaker of the Kansas House of Representatives is the leader of the chamber and is elected by his fellow state representatives. The speaker presides over the legislative process on the floor of the chamber or appoints a presiding officer. The speaker decides the committee structure. The majority and minority leaders, are elected by their respective party caucuses relative to their party's strength in the chamber.

=== Officers ===
| Position | Name | Party | District |
|---|---|---|---|
| Speaker of the House | Daniel Hawkins | Republican | 100 |
| Speaker Pro Tem | Blake Carpenter | Republican | 81 |
| Majority Leader | Chris Croft | Republican | 8 |
| Assistant Majority Leader | Kyle Hoffman | Republican | 116 |
| Majority Whip | Nick Hoheisel | Republican | 97 |
| Majority Caucus Chair | Kristey Williams | Republican | 77 |
| Minority Leader | Brandon Woodard | Democratic | 108 |
| Assistant Minority Leader | Mike Amyx | Democratic | 45 |
| Minority Whip | Jo Ella Hoye | Democratic | 17 |
| Minority Caucus Chair | Barbara Ballard | Democratic | 44 |
| Minority Agenda Chair | Jerry Stogsdill | Democratic | 21 |
| Minority Policy Chair | Dan Osman | Democratic | 48 |

== Members of the Kansas House of Representatives ==
| District | Representative | Party | Residence | First elected |
|---|---|---|---|---|
| 1 | Dale Helwig | Republican | Columbus | 2024 |
| 2 | Ken Collins | Republican | Mulberry | 2018 |
| 3 | Chuck Smith | Republican | Pittsburg | 2014 |
| 4 | Ricky James | Republican | La Cygne | 2024 |
| 5 | Courtney Sappington | Republican | Baldwin City | 2025 |
| 6 | Samantha Poetter Parshall | Republican | Paola | 2020 |
| 7 | Vacant (Note: Dan Goddard died on October 29, 2026) | Republican | | |
| 8 | Chris Croft | Republican | Overland Park | 2018 |
| 9 | Fred Gardner | Republican | Garnett | 2022 |
| 10 | Suzanne Wikle | Democratic | Lawrence | 2024 |
| 11 | Ron Bryce | Republican | Coffeyville | 2022 |
| 12 | Doug Blex | Republican | Independence | 2016 |
| 13 | Duane Droge | Republican | Eureka | 2022 |
| 14 | Charlotte Esau | Republican | Olathe | 2024 |
| 15 | Lauren Bohi | Republican | Olathe | 2024 |
| 16 | Linda Featherston | Democratic | Overland Park | 2020 |
| 17 | Jo Ella Hoye | Democratic | Lenexa | 2020 |
| 18 | Cindy Neighbor | Democratic | Shawnee | 2002 |
| 19 | Stephanie Clayton | Democratic | Overland Park | 2012 |
| 20 | Mari-Lynn Poskin | Democratic | Leawood | 2020 |
| 21 | Jerry Stogsdill | Democratic | Prairie Village | 2016 |
| 22 | Lindsay Vaughn | Democratic | Overland Park | 2020 |
| 23 | Susan Ruiz | Democratic | Shawnee | 2018 |
| 24 | Jarrod Ousley | Democratic | Merriam | 2014 |
| 25 | Rui Xu | Democratic | Westwood | 2018 |
| 26 | Chip VanHouden | Republican | Spring Hill | 2024 |
| 27 | Sean Tarwater | Republican | Stilwell | 2016 |
| 28 | Carl Turner | Republican | Leawood | 2020 |
| 29 | Heather Meyer | Democratic | Overland Park | 2022 |
| 30 | Laura Williams | Republican | Lenexa | 2022 |
| 31 | Louis Ruiz | Democratic | Kansas City | 2004 |
| 32 | Pam Curtis | Democratic | Kansas City | 2014 |
| 33 | Carolyn Caiharr | Republican | Edwardsville | 2025 |
| 34 | Valdenia Winn | Democratic | Kansas City | 2000 |
| 35 | Wanda Brownlee Paige | Democratic | Kansas City | 2024 |
| 36 | Lynn Melton | Democratic | Kansas City | 2022 |
| 37 | Melissa Oropeza | Democratic | Kansas City | 2022 |
| 38 | Timothy H. Johnson | Republican | Basehor | 2020 |
| 39 | Angela Stiens | Republican | Shawnee | 2024 |
| 40 | David Buehler | Republican | Lansing | 2022 |
| 41 | Pat Proctor | Republican | Leavenworth | 2020 |
| 42 | Lance Neelly | Republican | Tonganoxie | 2020 |
| 43 | Bill Sutton | Republican | Gardner | 2012 |
| 44 | Barbara Ballard | Democratic | Lawrence | 1992 |
| 45 | Mike Amyx | Democratic | Lawrence | 2018 |
| 46 | Brooklynne Mosley | Democratic | Lawrence | 2024 |
| 47 | Ronald Ellis | Republican | Meriden | 2016 |
| 48 | Dan Osman | Democratic | Overland Park | 2020 |
| 49 | Nikki McDonald | Democratic | Olathe | 2023 |
| 50 | Kyle McNorton | Republican | Topeka | 2023 |
| 51 | Megan Steele | Republican | Manhattan | 2024 |
| 52 | Jesse Borjon | Republican | Topeka | 2020 |
| 53 | Kirk Haskins | Democratic | Topeka | 2022 |
| 54 | Ken Corbet | Republican | Topeka | 2012 |
| 55 | Tobias Schlingensiepen | Democratic | Topeka | 2022 |
| 56 | Virgil Weigel | Democratic | Topeka | 2012 |
| 57 | John Alcala | Democratic | Topeka | 2012 |
| 58 | Alexis Simmons | Democratic | Topeka | 2024 |
| 59 | Rebecca Schmoe | Republican | Ottawa | 2022 |
| 60 | Mark Schreiber | Republican | Emporia | 2016 |
| 61 | Francis Awerkamp | Republican | St. Marys | 2016 |
| 62 | Sean Willcott | Republican | Holton | 2024 |
| 63 | Allen Reavis | Republican | Atchison | 2024 |
| 64 | Lewis Bloom | Republican | Clay Center | 2022 |
| 65 | Shawn Chauncey | Republican | Junction City | 2024 |
| 66 | Sydney Carlin | Democratic | Manhattan | 2002 |
| 67 | Angelina Roeser | Republican | Manhattan | 2024 |
| 68 | Nathan Butler | Republican | Junction City | 2022 |
| 69 | Clarke Sanders | Republican | Salina | 2020 |
| 70 | Greg Wilson | Republican | Abilene | 2025 |
| 71 | Steven Howe | Republican | Salina | 2020 |
| 72 | Avery Anderson | Republican | Newton | 2020 |
| 73 | Rick Wilborn | Republican | McPherson | 2024 |
| 74 | Mike King | Republican | Hesston | 2024 |
| 75 | Will Carpenter | Republican | El Dorado | 2012 |
| 76 | Bradley Barrett | Republican | Osage City | 2024 |
| 77 | Kristey Williams | Republican | Augusta | 2014 |
| 78 | Robyn Essex | Republican | Olathe | 2022 |
| 79 | Webster Roth | Republican | Winfield | 2022 |
| 80 | Bill Rhiley | Republican | Wellington | 2018 |
| 81 | Blake Carpenter | Republican | Derby | 2014 |
| 82 | Leah Howell | Republican | Derby | 2022 |
| 83 | Henry Helgerson | Democratic | Eastborough | 1982 |
| 84 | Ford Carr | Democratic | Wichita | 2022 |
| 85 | Steven Brunk | Republican | Wichita | 2025 |
| 86 | Abi Boatman | Democratic | Wichita | 2026 |
| 87 | Susan Estes | Republican | Wichita | 2020 |
| 88 | Sandy Pickert | Republican | Wichita | 2022 |
| 89 | KC Ohaebosim | Democratic | Wichita | 2018 |
| 90 | Steve Huebert | Republican | Valley Center | 2024 |
| 91 | Emil Bergquist | Republican | Park City | 2022 |
| 92 | John Carmichael | Democratic | Wichita | 2012 |
| 93 | Brian Bergkamp | Republican | Wichita | 2020 |
| 94 | Leo Delperdang | Republican | Wichita | 2018 |
| 95 | Tom Sawyer | Democratic | Wichita | 1986 |
| 96 | Tom Kessler | Republican | Wichita | 2020 |
| 97 | Nick Hoheisel | Republican | Wichita | 2018 |
| 98 | Cyndi Howerton | Republican | Wichita | 2020 |
| 99 | Susan Humphries | Republican | Wichita | 2016 |
| 100 | Daniel Hawkins | Republican | Wichita | 2012 |
| 101 | Joe Seiwert | Republican | Pretty Prairie | 2008 |
| 102 | Kyler Sweely | Republican | Hutchinson | 2024 |
| 103 | Angela Martinez | Democratic | Wichita | 2022 |
| 104 | Paul Waggoner | Republican | Hutchinson | 2018 |
| 105 | Jill Ward | Republican | Wichita | 2024 |
| 106 | Lisa Moser | Republican | Wheaton | 2020 |
| 107 | Dawn Wolf | Republican | Bennington | 2024 |
| 108 | Brandon Woodard | Democratic | Lenexa | 2018 |
| 109 | Troy Waymaster | Republican | Bunker Hill | 2012 |
| 110 | Ken Rahjes | Republican | Agra | 2014 |
| 111 | Barb Wasinger | Republican | Hays | 2018 |
| 112 | Sherri Brantley | Republican | Great Bend | 2024 |
| 113 | Brett Fairchild | Republican | St. John | 2020 |
| 114 | Kevin Schwertfeger | Republican | Turon | 2024 |
| 115 | Gary White | Republican | Ashland | 2022 |
| 116 | Kyle Hoffman | Republican | Coldwater | 2010 |
| 117 | Adam Turk | Republican | Shawnee | 2022 |
| 118 | Jim Minnix | Republican | Scott City | 2020 |
| 119 | Jason Goetz | Republican | Dodge City | 2022 |
| 120 | Adam Smith | Republican | Weskan | 2016 |
| 121 | Mike Storm | Republican | Olathe | 2026 |
| 122 | Lon Pishny | Republican | Garden City | 2024 |
| 123 | Bob Lewis | Republican | Garden City | 2022 |
| 124 | Marty Long | Republican | Ulysses | 2024 |
| 125 | Shannon Francis | Republican | Liberal | 2014 |

== Committee leadership ==
=== 2023–2024 ===
| Committee | Chairman | Vice Chairman | Ranking Minority Member |
|---|---|---|---|
| Agriculture and Natural Resources | Ken Rahjes | Lance Neelly | Sydney Carlin |
| Agriculture and Natural Resources Budget | Lisa Moser | Marty Long | Sydney Carlin |
| Appropriations | Troy Waymaster | Kristey Williams | Barbara Ballard |
| Calendar and Printing | Chris Croft | Daniel Hawkins | Brandon Woodard |
| Child Welfare and Foster Care | Cyndi Howerton | Timothy H. Johnson | Jarrod Ousley |
| Commerce, Labor and Economic Development | Sean Tarwater | Adam Turk | Stephanie Clayton |
| Corrections and Juvenile Justice | Bob Lewis | John Resman | Tobias Schlingensiepen |
| Education | Susan Estes | Kyle McNorton | Jerry Stogsdill |
| Elections | Pat Proctor | Paul Waggoner | Kirk Haskins |
| Energy, Utilities and Telecommunications | Leo Delperdang | Rick Wilborn | KC Ohaebosim |
| Federal and State Affairs | Tom Kessler | Rebecca Schmoe | Silas Miller |
| Financial Institutions and Pensions | Nick Hoheisel | Angela Stiens | Rui Xu |
| General Government Budget | Barb Wasinger | Sandy Pickert | Lynn Melton |
| Health and Human Services | Will Carpenter | Ron Bryce | Susan Ruiz |
| Higher Education Budget | Steven Howe | Clarke Sanders | Mike Amyx |
| Insurance | Bill Sutton | Brian Bergkamp | Cindy Neighbor |
| Interstate Cooperation | Daniel Hawkins | Blake Carpenter | Mike Amyx |
| Judiciary | Susan Humphries | Laura Williams | Dan Osman |
| K-12 Education Budget | Jason Goetz | Scott Hill | Valdenia Winn |
| Legislative Budget (House) | Troy Waymaster | Kristey Williams | Barbara Ballard |
| Legislative Modernization | Patrick Penn | Jesse Borjon | Alexis Simmons |
| Local Government | Emil Bergquist | Doug Blex | Linda Featherston |
| Rules and Journal | Susan Humphries | — | Stephanie Clayton |
| Social Services Budget | David Buehler | Will Carpenter | Melissa Oropeza |
| Taxation | Adam Smith | Carl Turner | Tom Sawyer |
| Transportation | Shannon Francis | Robyn Essex | Henry Helgerson |
| Transportation and Public Safety Budget | Avery Anderson | Leah Howell | Jo Ella Hoye |
| Veterans and Military | Mike Thompson | Nathan Butler | Mari-Lynn Poskin |
| Water | Jim Minnix | Gary White | Lindsay Vaughn |
| Welfare Reform | Francis Awerkamp | Bill Rhiley | Jarrod Ousley |

== Past composition ==
The Republican Party has controlled the Kansas House in most of Kansas History, with the Democratic control occurring less. Since 1992, the GOP has held most seats. The Democratic Party of Kansas had held most seats in the early 90s, but the party has never gained a trifecta in Kansas political history.

== See also ==
- List of Kansas state legislatures
