= 2026 Kansas House of Representatives election =

- November 3, 2026

All 125 seats in the Kansas House of Representatives 63 seats needed for a majority
	Majority party	Minority party
Leader	Daniel Hawkins (retiring)	Brandon Woodard
Party	Republican	Democratic
Leader's seat	100th district	108th district
Seats before	88	37
Seats won	68	57
Seat change	▼20	▲20
- Republican incumbent Democratic incumbent Democratic gain Results TBD
Speaker before election
Daniel Hawkins
Republican
Elected Speaker
TBD

The 2026 Kansas House of Representatives election was held on November 3, 2026, alongside the other 2026 United States elections. Voters elected members of the Kansas House of Representatives in all 125 of the U.S. state of Kansas's legislative districts to serve a two-year term.

== Retirements ==
=== Republicans ===
1. District 3: Chuck Smith is retiring for personal reasons.
2. District 7: Dan Goddard died.
3. District 12: Doug Blex is retiring for personal reasons.
4. District 41: Pat Proctor is retiring to run for secretary of state.
5. District 67: Angelina Roeser is retiring for personal reasons.
6. District 73: Rick Wilborn is retiring for personal reasons.
7. District 75: Will Carpenter is retiring for personal reasons.
8. District 76: Bradley Barrett is retiring for personal reasons.
9. District 100: Daniel Hawkins is retiring to run for Kansas Insurance Commissioner.
10. District 101: Joe Seiwert is retiring for personal reasons.
11. District 104: Paul Waggoner is retiring for personal reasons.
12. District 110: Ken Rahjes is retiring to run for secretary of state.

=== Democrats ===
1. District 22: Lindsay Vaughn is retiring for personal reasons.
2. District 31: Louis Ruiz is retiring for personal reasons.
3. District 89: KC Ohaebosim is retiring to run for Lieutenant Governor of Kansas

== Predictions ==
Source	Ranking	As of
Sabato's Crystal Ball	Likely R	January 22, 2026
State Navigate	Safe R	October 21, 2026

== Summary of results ==
† retirement

District	2024 Pres.	Incumbent	Party	Elected Representative	Party
1st	R+54.1	Dale Helwig	Rep	Dale Helwig	Rep
2nd	R+42.5	Ken Collins	Rep	Daniel Muter	Rep
3rd	R+14.5	Chuck Smith†	Rep	D. J. Perry	Rep
4th	R+58.3	Ricky James	Rep	Ricky James	Rep
5th	R+29.4	Courtney Sappington	Rep	Courtney Sappington	Rep
6th	R+39.0	Samantha Poetter Parshall	Rep	Samantha Poetter Parshall	Rep
7th	R+35.8	Dan Goddard†	Rep	Thomas Douglas Allen	Rep
8th	R+6.1	Chris Croft	Rep	TBD	
9th	R+51.7	Fred Gardner	Rep	Fred Gardner	Rep
10th	D+54.8	Suzanne Wikle	Dem	Suzanne Wikle	Dem
11th	R+46.8	Ron Bryce	Rep	Ron Bryce	Rep
12th	R+64.1	Doug Blex†	Rep	Marci Laffen	Rep
13th	R+57.0	Duane Droge	Rep	Duane Droge	Rep
14th	D+2.4	Charlotte Esau	Rep	Sherry Giebler	Dem
15th	R+0.8	Lauren Bohi	Rep	Allison Hougland	Dem
16th	D+9.9	Linda Featherston	Dem	Linda Featherston	Dem
17th	D+12.4	Jo Ella Hoye	Dem	Jo Ella Hoye	Dem
18th	D+12.2	Cindy Neighbor	Dem	Cindy Neighbor	Dem
19th	D+26.4	Stephanie Clayton	Dem	Stephanie Clayton	Dem
20th	D+15.7	Mari-Lynn Poskin	Dem	Mari-Lynn Poskin	Dem
21st	D+33.0	Jerry Stogsdill	Dem	Jerry Stogsdill	Dem
22nd	D+25.3	Lindsay Vaughn†	Dem	Reed Krewson	Dem
23rd	D+21.6	Susan Ruiz	Dem	Susan Ruiz	Dem
24th	D+29.0	Jarrod Ousley	Dem	Jarrod Ousley	Dem
25th	D+36.0	Rui Xu	Dem	Rui Xu	Dem
26th	R+13.7	Chip VanHouden	Rep	TBD	
27th	R+9.7	Sean Tarwater	Rep	TBD	
28th	D+4.9	Carl Turner	Rep	Bryan Mouber	Dem
29th	D+21.3	Heather Meyer	Dem	Heather Meyer	Dem
30th	R+3.2	Laura Williams	Rep	Amanda Wiederaenders	Dem
31st	D+35.9	Louis Ruiz†	Dem	Emily Hane	Dem
32nd	D+40.5	Pam Curtis	Dem	Pam Curtis	Dem
33rd	R+4.5	Carolyn Caiharr	Rep	Emily Blanks	Dem
34th	D+54.6	Valdenia Winn	Dem	Valdenia Winn	Dem
35th	D+53.4	Wanda Brownlee Paige	Dem	Wanda Brownlee Paige	Dem
36th	D+13.3	Lynn Melton	Dem	Lynn Melton	Dem
37th	D+16.7	Melissa Oropeza	Dem	Melissa Oropeza	Dem
38th	R+25.1	Timothy H. Johnson	Rep	Timothy H. Johnson	Rep
39th	R+0.2	Angela Stiens	Rep	Zach Maier	Dem
40th	R+11.7	David Buehler	Rep	TBD	
41st	R+16.8	Pat Proctor†	Rep	Jeff Pittman	Dem
42nd	R+25.8	Lance Neelly	Rep	Lance Neelly	Rep
43rd	R+23.2	Bill Sutton	Rep	TBD	
44th	D+51.8	Barbara Ballard	Dem	Barbara Ballard	Dem
45th	D+39.9	Mike Amyx	Dem	Mike Amyx	Dem
46th	D+70.6	Brooklynne Mosley	Dem	Brooklynne Mosley	Dem
47th	R+32.2	Ronald Ellis	Rep	Paula Newell Ellis	Rep
48th	D+9.1	Dan Osman	Dem	Dan Osman	Dem
49th	D+4.2	Nikki McDonald	Dem	Nikki McDonald	Dem
50th	R+28.4	Kyle McNorton	Rep	Kyle McNorton	Rep
51st	R+34.8	Megan Steele	Rep	Megan Steele	Rep
52nd	R+2.6	Jesse Borjon	Rep	Jesse Borjon	Rep
53rd	D+10.5	Kirk Haskins	Dem	Kirk Haskins	Dem
54th	R+34.2	Ken Corbet	Rep	Ken Corbet	Rep
55th	D+23.4	Tobias Schlingensiepen	Dem	Tobias Schlingensiepen	Dem
56th	D+9.4	Virgil Weigel	Dem	Virgil Weigel	Dem
57th	D+7.9	John Alcala	Dem	John Alcala	Dem
58th	D+23.4	Alexis Simmons	Dem	Alexis Simmons	Dem
59th	R+39.6	Rebecca Schmoe	Rep	Rebecca Schmoe	Rep
60th	R+2.7	Mark Schreiber	Rep	Mark Schreiber	Rep
61st	R+45.3	Francis Awerkamp	Rep	Francis Awerkamp	Rep
62nd	R+58.8	Sean Willcott	Rep	Sean Willcott	Rep
63rd	R+46.0	Allen Reavis	Rep	Allen Reavis	Rep
64th	R+51.9	Lewis Bloom	Rep	Lewis Bloom	Rep
65th	R+14.7	Shawn Chauncey	Rep	Shawn Chauncey	Rep
66th	D+24.4	Sydney Carlin	Dem	Sydney Carlin	Dem
67th	D+5.5	Angelina Roeser†	Rep	Brenda Bandy	Dem
68th	R+34.3	Nathan Butler	Rep	Nathan Butler	Rep
69th	R+33.5	Clarke Sanders	Rep	Luci Larson	Rep
70th	R+54.1	Greg Wilson	Rep	Greg Wilson	Rep
71st	R+29.9	Steven Howe	Rep	Steven Howe	Rep
72nd	R+22.7	Avery Anderson	Rep	Avery Anderson	Rep
73rd	R+37.1	Rick Wilborn†	Rep	Lori Shultz	Rep
74th	R+33.8	Mike King	Rep	Mike King	Rep
75th	R+45.2	Will Carpenter†	Rep	Tyler Coats	Rep
76th	R+49.0	Bradley Barrett†	Rep	Russel Stukey	Rep
77th	R+42.6	Kristey Williams	Rep	Kristey Williams	Rep
78th	R+1.8	Robyn Essex	Rep	Tim Lundberg	Dem
79th	R+40.6	Webster Roth	Rep	Webster Roth	Rep
80th	R+40.6	Bill Rhiley	Rep	Bill Rhiley	Rep
81st	R+26.5	Blake Carpenter	Rep	Blake Carpenter	Rep
82nd	R+32.5	Leah Howell	Rep	Leah Howell	Rep
83rd	D+17.7	Henry Helgerson	Dem	Brandon Whipple	Dem
84th	D+42.2	Ford Carr	Dem	Bonita Gooch	Dem
85th	R+8.1	Steven Brunk	Rep	Mackenzi Truelove	Dem
86th	D+12.4	Abi Boatman	Dem	Abi Boatman	Dem
87th	R+4.6	Susan Estes	Rep	Susan Estes	Rep
88th	D+0.4	Sandy Pickert	Rep	Candace Landers	Dem
89th	D+23.2	KC Ohaebosim†	Dem	Carol Brewer	Dem
90th	R+40.5	Steve Huebert	Rep	Steve Huebert	Rep
91st	R+26.3	Emil Bergquist	Rep	Emil Bergquist	Rep
92nd	D+15.9	John Carmichael	Dem	John Carmichael	Dem
93rd	R+49.1	Brian Bergkamp	Rep	Brian Bergkamp	Rep
94th	R+25.0	Leo Delperdang	Rep	Leo Delperdang	Rep
95th	D+0.8	Tom Sawyer	Dem	Tom Sawyer	Dem
96th	R+7.6	Tom Kessler	Rep	Jessica Maldonado	Dem
97th	R+22.1	Nick Hoheisel	Rep	Nick Hoheisel	Rep
98th	R+25.3	Cyndi Howerton	Rep	Cyndi Howerton	Rep
99th	R+24.2	Susan Humphries	Rep	Susan Humphries	Rep
100th	R+19.9	Daniel Hawkins†	Rep	Al Jirak	Rep
101st	R+47.5	Joe Seiwert†	Rep	Kevin O'Brien	Rep
102nd	R+17.9	Kyler Sweely	Rep	Jason Probst	Dem
103rd	D+23.0	Angela Martinez	Dem	Angela Martinez	Dem
104th	R+35.3	Paul Waggoner†	Rep	Randy Parks	Rep
105th	R+13.8	Jill Ward	Rep	John Burke	Dem
106th	R+60.8	Lisa Moser	Rep	Lisa Moser	Rep
107th	R+56.5	Dawn Wolf	Rep	Dawn Wolf	Rep
108th	D+17.2	Brandon Woodard	Dem	Brandon Woodard	Dem
109th	R+62.1	Troy Waymaster	Rep	Troy Waymaster	Rep
110th	R+69.3	Ken Rahjes	Rep	Ken Rahjes	Rep
111th	R+41.0	Barb Wasinger	Rep	Barb Wasinger	Rep
112th	R+55.4	Sherri Brantley	Rep	Sherri Brantley	Rep
113th	R+58.6	Brett Fairchild	Rep	Brett Fairchild	Rep
114th	R+54.9	Kevin Schwertfeger	Rep	Kevin Schwertfeger	Rep
115th	R+63.5	Gary White	Rep	Gary White	Rep
116th	R+62.3	Kyle Hoffman	Rep	Kyle Hoffman	Rep
117th	R+6.6	Adam Turk	Rep	TBD	
118th	R+74.9	Jim Minnix	Rep	Jim Minnix	Rep
119th	R+23.3	Jason Goetz	Rep	Jason Goetz	Rep
120th	R+69.4	Adam Smith	Rep	Adam Smith	Rep
121st	R+4.3	Mike Storm	Rep	Kelsey Stock	Dem
122nd	R+56.0	Lon Pishny	Rep	Lon Pishny	Rep
123rd	R+27.6	Bob Lewis	Rep	TBD	
124th	R+67.9	Marty Long	Rep	Marty Long	Rep
125th	R+40.8	Shannon Francis	Rep	Shannon Francis	Rep

== List of districts ==
=== District 1 ===
The 1st district is represented by Republican Dale Helwig, who is eligible to run for re-election but has not yet stated if he will do so.

=== District 2 ===
The 2nd district is represented by Republican Ken Collins, who is eligible to run for re-election but has not yet stated if he will do so.

=== District 3 ===
The 3rd district is represented by Republican Chuck Smith, who is retiring.

=== District 4 ===
The 4th district is represented by Republican Ricky James, who is eligible to run for re-election but has not yet stated if he will do so.

=== District 5 ===
The 5th district is represented by Republican Courtney Sappington, who is eligible to run for re-election but has not yet stated if she will do so.

=== District 6 ===
The 6th district is represented by Republican Samantha Poetter Parshall, who is eligible to run for re-election but has not yet stated if she will do so.

=== District 7 ===
The 7th district is represented by Republican Dan Goddard, who is retiring.

=== District 8 ===
The 8th district is represented by Republican Chris Croft, who is eligible to run for re-election but has not yet stated if he will do so.

=== District 9 ===
The 9th district is represented by Republican Fred Gardner, who is eligible to run for re-election but has not yet stated if he will do so.

=== District 10 ===
The 10th district is represented by Democrat Suzanne Wikle, who is eligible to run for re-election but has not yet stated if she will do so.

=== District 11 ===
The 11th district is represented by Republican Ron Bryce, who is eligible to run for re-election but has not yet stated if he will do so.

=== District 12 ===
The 12th district is represented by Republican Doug Blex, who is retiring.

=== District 13 ===
The 13th district is represented by Republican Duane Droge, who is eligible to run for re-election but has not yet stated if he will do so.

=== District 14 ===
The 14th district is represented by Republican Charlotte Esau, who is eligible to run for re-election but has not yet stated if she will do so.

=== District 15 ===
The 15th district is represented by Republican Lauren Bohi, who is eligible to run for re-election but has not yet stated if she will do so.

=== District 16 ===
The 16th district is represented by Democrat Linda Featherston, who is eligible to run for re-election but has not yet stated if she will do so.

=== District 17 ===
The 17th district is represented by Democrat Jo Ella Hoye, who is eligible to run for re-election but has not yet stated if she will do so.

=== District 18 ===
The 18th district is represented by Democrat Cindy Neighbor, who is eligible to run for re-election but has not yet stated if she will do so.

=== District 19 ===
The 19th district is represented by Democrat Stephanie Clayton, who is eligible to run for re-election but has not yet stated if she will do so.

=== District 20 ===
The 20th district is represented by Democrat Mari-Lynn Poskin, who is eligible to run for re-election but has not yet stated if she will do so.

=== District 21 ===
The 21st district is represented by Democrat Jerry Stogsdill, who is eligible to run for re-election but has not yet stated if he will do so.

=== District 22 ===
The 22nd district is represented by Democrat Lindsay Vaughn, who is retiring.

=== District 23 ===
The 23rd district is represented by Democrat Susan Ruiz, who is eligible to run for re-election but has not yet stated if she will do so.

=== District 24 ===
The 24th district is represented by Democrat Jarrod Ousley, who is eligible to run for re-election but has not yet stated if he will do so.

=== District 25 ===
The 25th district is represented by Democrat Rui Xu, who is eligible to run for re-election but has not yet stated if he will do so.

=== District 26 ===
The 26th district is represented by Republican Chip VanHouden, who is eligible to run for re-election but has not yet stated if he will do so.

=== District 27 ===
The 27th district is represented by Republican Sean Tarwater, who is eligible to run for re-election but has not yet stated if he will do so.

=== District 28 ===
The 28th district is represented by Republican Carl Turner, who is eligible to run for re-election but has not yet stated if he will do so.

=== District 29 ===
The 29th district is represented by Democrat Heather Meyer, who is eligible to run for re-election but has not yet stated if she will do so.

=== District 30 ===
The 30th district is represented by Republican Laura Williams, who is eligible to run for re-election but has not yet stated if she will do so.

=== District 31 ===
The 31st district is represented by Democrat Louis Ruiz, who is retiring.

=== District 32 ===
The 32nd district is represented by Democrat Pam Curtis, who is eligible to run for re-election but has not yet stated if she will do so.

=== District 33 ===
The 33rd district is represented by Republican Carolyn Caiharr, who is eligible to run for re-election but has not yet stated if he will do so.

=== District 34 ===
The 34th district is represented by Democrat Valdenia Winn, who is eligible to run for re-election but has not yet stated if she will do so.

=== District 35 ===
The 35th district is represented by Democrat Wanda Brownlee Paige, who is eligible to run for re-election but has not yet stated if she will do so.

=== District 36 ===
The 36th district is represented by Democrat Lynn Melton, who is eligible to run for re-election but has not yet stated if she will do so.

=== District 37 ===
The 37th district is represented by Democrat Melissa Oropeza, who is eligible to run for re-election but has not yet stated if she will do so.

=== District 38 ===
The 38th district is represented by Republican Timothy H. Johnson, who is eligible to run for re-election but has not yet stated if he will do so.

=== District 39 ===
The 39th district is represented by Republican Angela Stiens, who is eligible to run for re-election but has not yet stated if she will do so.

=== District 40 ===
The 40th district is represented by Republican David Buehler, who is eligible to run for re-election but has not yet stated if he will do so.

=== District 41 ===
The 41st district is represented by Republican Pat Proctor, who is retiring to run for Kansas Secretary of State. Former Democratic representative Jeff Pittman is running to reclaim his old seat against Republican nominee Ann Reinhart, who was disavowed by the state Republican Party due to her history of domestic violence.

=== District 42 ===
The 42nd district is represented by Republican Lance Neelly, who is eligible to run for re-election but has not yet stated if he will do so.

=== District 43 ===
The 43rd district is represented by Republican Bill Sutton, who is eligible to run for re-election but has not yet stated if he will do so.

=== District 44 ===
The 44th district is represented by Democrat Barbara Ballard, who is eligible to run for re-election but has not yet stated if she will do so.

=== District 45 ===
The 45th district is represented by Democrat Mike Amyx, who is eligible to run for re-election but has not yet stated if he will do so.

=== District 46 ===
The 46th district is represented by Democrat Brooklynne Mosley, who is eligible to run for re-election but has not yet stated if she will do so.

=== District 47 ===
The 47th district is represented by Republican Ronald Ellis, who is eligible to run for re-election but has not yet stated if he will do so.

=== District 48 ===
The 48th district is represented by Democrat Dan Osman, who is eligible to run for re-election but has not yet stated if he will do so.

=== District 49 ===
The 49th district is represented by Democrat Nikki McDonald, who is eligible to run for re-election but has not yet stated if she will do so.

=== District 50 ===
The 50th district is represented by Republican Kyle McNorton, who is eligible to run for re-election but has not yet stated if he will do so.

=== District 51 ===
The 51st district is represented by Republican Megan Steele, who is eligible to run for re-election but has not yet stated if she will do so.

=== District 52 ===
The 52nd district is represented by Republican Jesse Borjon, who is eligible to run for re-election but has not yet stated if he will do so.

=== District 53 ===
The 53rd district is represented by Democrat Kirk Haskins, who is eligible to run for re-election but has not yet stated if he will do so.

=== District 54 ===
The 54th district is represented by Republican Ken Corbet, who is eligible to run for re-election but has not yet stated if he will do so.

=== District 55 ===
The 55th district is represented by Democrat Tobias Schlingensiepen, who is eligible to run for re-election but has not yet stated if he will do so.

=== District 56 ===
The 56th district is represented by Democrat Virgil Weigel, who is eligible to run for re-election but has not yet stated if he will do so.

=== District 57 ===
The 57th district is represented by Democrat John Alcala, who is eligible to run for re-election but has not yet stated if he will do so.

=== District 58 ===
The 58th district is represented by Democrat Alexis Simmons, who is eligible to run for re-election but has not yet stated if she will do so.

=== District 59 ===
The 59th district is represented by Republican Rebecca Schmoe, who is eligible to run for re-election but has not yet stated if she will do so.

=== District 60 ===
The 60th district is represented by Republican Mark Schreiber, who is eligible to run for re-election but has not yet stated if he will do so.

=== District 61 ===
The 61st district is represented by Republican Francis Awerkamp, who is eligible to run for re-election but has not yet stated if he will do so.

=== District 62 ===
The 62nd district is represented by Republican Sean Willcott, who is eligible to run for re-election but has not yet stated if he will do so.

=== District 63 ===
The 63rd district is represented by Republican Allen Reavis, who is eligible to run for re-election but has not yet stated if he will do so.

=== District 64 ===
The 64th district is represented by Republican Lewis Bloom, who is eligible to run for re-election but has not yet stated if he will do so.

=== District 65 ===
The 65th district is represented by Republican Shawn Chauncey, who is eligible to run for re-election but has not yet stated if he will do so.

=== District 66 ===
The 66th district is represented by Democrat Sydney Carlin, who is running for re-election.

=== District 67 ===
The 67th district is represented by Republican Angelina Roeser, who is retiring.

=== District 68 ===
The 68th district is represented by Republican Nathan Butler, who is eligible to run for re-election but has not yet stated if he will do so.

=== District 69 ===
The 69th district is represented by Republican Clarke Sanders, who is eligible to run for re-election but has not yet stated if he will do so.

=== District 70 ===
The 70th district is represented by Republican Greg Wilson, who is eligible to run for re-election but has not yet stated if he will do so.

=== District 71 ===
The 71st district is represented by Republican Steven Howe, who is eligible to run for re-election but has not yet stated if he will do so.

=== District 72 ===
The 72nd district is represented by Republican Avery Anderson, who is eligible to run for re-election but has not yet stated if she will do so.

=== District 73 ===
The 73rd district is represented by Republican Rick Wilborn, who is retiring.

=== District 74 ===
The 74th district is represented by Republican Mike King, who is eligible to run for re-election but has not yet stated if he will do so.

=== District 75 ===
The 75th district is represented by Republican Will Carpenter, who is retiring.

=== District 76 ===
The 76th district is represented by Republican Bradley Barrett, who is retiring.

=== District 77 ===
The 77th district is represented by Republican Kristey Williams, who is eligible to run for re-election but has not yet stated if she will do so.

=== District 78 ===
The 78th district is represented by Republican Robyn Essex, who is eligible to run for re-election but has not yet stated if she will do so.

=== District 79 ===
The 79th district is represented by Republican Webster Roth, who is eligible to run for re-election but has not yet stated if he will do so.

=== District 80 ===
The 80th district is represented by Republican Bill Rhiley, who is running for re-election. Recent high school graduate Lex Goff is challenging Rhiley as a Bi-Partisan Independent, focused on issues like agriculture, tax relief, and healthcare access.

=== District 81 ===
The 81st district is represented by Republican Blake Carpenter, who is eligible to run for re-election but has not yet stated if he will do so.

=== District 82 ===
The 82nd district is represented by Republican Leah Howell, who is eligible to run for re-election but has not yet stated if she will do so.

=== District 83 ===
The 83rd district is represented by Democrat Henry Helgerson, who is eligible to run for re-election but has not yet stated if he will do so.

=== District 84 ===
The 84th district is represented by Democrat Ford Carr, who is eligible to run for re-election but has not yet stated if he will do so.

=== District 85 ===
The 85th district is represented by Republican Steve Brunk, who is eligible to run for re-election but has not yet stated if he will do so.

=== District 86 ===
The 86th district is represented by Democrat Abi Boatman, who is eligible to run for re-election but has not yet stated if she will do so.

=== District 87 ===
The 87th district is represented by Republican Susan Estes, who is eligible to run for re-election but has not yet stated if she will do so.

=== District 88 ===
The 88th district is represented by Republican Sandy Pickert, who is eligible to run for re-election but has not yet stated if she will do so.

=== District 89 ===
The 89th district is represented by Democrat KC Ohaebosim, who is retiring to run for lieutenant governor.

=== District 90 ===
The 90th district is represented by Republican Steve Huebert, who is eligible to run for re-election but has not yet stated if he will do so.

=== District 91 ===
The 91st district is represented by Republican Emil Bergquist, who is eligible to run for re-election but has not yet stated if she will do so.

=== District 92 ===
The 92nd district is represented by Democrat John Carmichael, who is eligible to run for re-election but has not yet stated if he will do so.

=== District 93 ===
The 93rd district is represented by Republican Brian Bergkamp, who is eligible to run for re-election but has not yet stated if he will do so.

=== District 94 ===
The 94th district is represented by Republican Leo Delperdang, who is eligible to run for re-election but has not yet stated if he will do so.

=== District 95 ===
The 95th district is represented by Democrat Tom Sawyer, who is eligible to run for re-election but has not yet stated if he will do so.

=== District 96 ===
The 96th district is represented by Republican Tom Kessler, who is eligible to run for re-election but has not yet stated if he will do so.

=== District 97 ===
The 97th district is represented by Republican Nick Hoheisel, who is eligible to run for re-election but has not yet stated if he will do so.

=== District 98 ===
The 98th district is represented by Republican Cyndi Howerton, who is eligible to run for re-election but has not yet stated if she will do so.

=== District 99 ===
The 99th district is represented by Republican Susan Humphries, who is eligible to run for re-election but has not yet stated if she will do so.

Mark B Barlow has filed to run as a Democrat in District 99.

=== District 100 ===
The 100th district is represented by Republican Daniel Hawkins, who is retiring to run for Kansas Insurance Commissioner.

=== District 101 ===
The 101st district is represented by Republican Joe Seiwert, who is retiring.

=== District 102 ===
The 102nd district is represented by Republican Kyler Sweely, who is eligible to run for re-election but has not yet stated if he will do so.

=== District 103 ===
The 103rd district is represented by Democrat Angela Martinez, who is running re-election. She is being challenged by Jordan Chessher. A child welfare advocate and aircraft inspector.

=== District 104 ===
The 104th district is represented by Republican Paul Waggoner, who is retiring.

=== District 105 ===
The 105th district is represented by Republican Jill Ward, who is eligible to run for re-election but has not yet stated if she will do so.

=== District 106 ===
The 106th district is represented by Republican Lisa Moser, who is eligible to run for re-election but has not yet stated if she will do so.

=== District 107 ===
The 107th district is represented by Republican Dawn Wolf, who is eligible to run for re-election but has not yet stated if she will do so.

=== District 108 ===
The 108th district is represented by Democrat Brandon Woodard, who is eligible to run for re-election but has not yet stated if he will do so.

=== District 109 ===
The 109th district is represented by Republican Troy Waymaster, who is eligible to run for re-election but has not yet stated if he will do so.

=== District 110 ===
The 110th district is represented by Republican Ken Rahjes, who is retiring to run for Kansas Secretary of State.

=== District 111 ===
The 111th district is represented by Republican Barb Wasinger, who is eligible to run for re-election but has not yet stated if she will do so.

=== District 112 ===
The 112th district is represented by Republican Sherri Brantley, who is eligible to run for re-election but has not yet stated if she will do so.

=== District 113 ===
The 113th district is represented by Republican Brett Fairchild, who is eligible to run for re-election but has not yet stated if he will do so.

=== District 114 ===
The 114th district is represented by Republican Kevin Schwertfeger, who is eligible to run for re-election but has not yet stated if he will do so.

=== District 115 ===
The 115th district is represented by Republican Gary White, who is eligible to run for re-election but has not yet stated if he will do so.

=== District 116 ===
The 116th district is represented by Republican Kyle Hoffman, who is eligible to run for re-election but has not yet stated if he will do so.

=== District 117 ===
The 117th district is represented by Republican Adam Turk, who is eligible to run for re-election but has not yet stated if he will do so.

=== District 118 ===
The 118th district is represented by Republican Jim Minnix, who is eligible to run for re-election but has not yet stated if he will do so.

=== District 119 ===
The 119th district is represented by Republican Jason Goetz, who is eligible to run for re-election but has not yet stated if he will do so.

=== District 120 ===
The 120th district is represented by Republican Adam Smith, who is eligible to run for re-election but has not yet stated if he will do so.

=== District 121 ===
The 121st district is represented by Republican Mike Storm, who is eligible to run for re-election but has not yet stated if he will do so.

=== District 122 ===
The 122nd district is represented by Republican Lon Pishny, who is running for re-election unopposed. Democratic challenger Amy Arteaga was disqualified after her filing paperwork arrived late due to a handling error.

=== District 123 ===
The 123rd district is represented by Republican Bob Lewis, who is eligible to run for re-election but has not yet stated if he will do so.

=== District 124 ===
The 124th district is represented by Republican Marty Long, who is eligible to run for re-election but has not yet stated if he will do so.

=== District 125 ===
The 125th district is represented by Republican Shannon Francis, who is eligible to run for re-election but has not yet stated if she will do so.
