= 2020 Kansas House of Representatives election =

- November 3, 2020

All 125 seats in the Kansas House of Representatives 63 seats needed for a majority

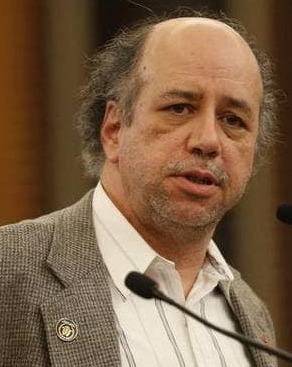
	Majority party	Minority party
Leader	Ron Ryckman Jr.	Tom Sawyer
Party	Republican	Democratic
Leader's seat	78th district	95th district
Seats before	84	41
Seats won	86	39
Seat change	▲2	▼2
Popular vote	789,261	479,381
Percentage	61.92%	37.61%
- Republican gain Democratic gain Republican hold Democratic hold 50–60% 60–70% 70–80% >90% 40–50% 50–60% 60–70% 70–80% 80–90% >90%
Speaker before election
Ray Merrick
Republican
Elected Speaker
Ron Ryckman Jr.
Republican

The 2020 Kansas House of Representatives elections took place as part of the 2020 United States elections. All 125 seats in the Kansas House of Representatives were up for re-election. Representatives serve two-year terms and are not term-limited.

== Results summary ==
Summary of the November 3, 2020 Kansas House of Representatives election results
Party	Votes	%	Seats	+/–	%
Republican Party	789,261	61.92%	86	+2	68.8%
Democratic Party	479,381	37.61%	39	-2	31.2%
Libertarian Party	3,865	0.30%	0	–	0%
Independent	2,125	0.17%	0	–	0%
Total	1,274,632	%	125	–	

== Predictions ==
Source	Ranking	As of
The Cook Political Report	Likely R	October 21, 2020

== Close races ==
Districts where the margin of victory was under 10%:

1. District 48, 0.46%
2. District 102, 0.46%
3. District 16, 0.48%
4. District 49, 2.14%
5. District 56, 2.36%
6. District 15, 2.94%
7. District 20, 3.1% (flip)
8. District 30, 4.18%
9. District 18, 4.7%
10. District 78, 4.72%
11. District 17, 5.06% (flip)
12. District 14, 5.8%
13. District 41, 6% (flip)
14. District 28, 6.3%
15. District 96, 6.52% (flip)
16. District 33, 7.16%
17. District 67, 7.44%
18. District 3, 7.96% (flip)
19. District 40, 8.08%
20. District 87, 8.76%
21. District 53, 9.74%
22. District 72, 9.84% (flip)
23. District 39, 9.56%

== Results ==
=== District 1 ===
District 1
Party	Candidate	Votes	%
Republican	Michael Houser	8,381	100.00
Total votes		8,381	100.00
Republican hold			

=== District 2 ===
District 2
Party	Candidate	Votes	%
Republican	Ken Collins	6,759	62.16
Democratic	Lynn D. Grant	4,115	37.84
Total votes		10,874	100.00
Republican hold			

=== District 3 ===
District 3
Party	Candidate	Votes	%
Republican	Chuck Smith	4,942	53.98
Democratic	Monica Murnan (incumbent)	4,213	46.02
Total votes		9,155	100.00
Republican gain from Democratic			

=== District 4 ===
District 4
Party	Candidate	Votes	%
Republican	Trevor Jacobs	7,881	74.89
Democratic	Bill Meyer	2,642	25.11
Total votes		10,523	100.00
Republican hold			

=== District 5 ===
District 5
Party	Candidate	Votes	%
Republican	Mark Samsel	8,061	77.34
Democratic	Roger Sims	2,362	22.66
Total votes		10,423	100.00
Republican hold			

=== District 6 ===
District 6
Party	Candidate	Votes	%
Republican	Samantha Poetter	11,111	100.00
Total votes		11,111	100.00
Republican hold			

=== District 7 ===
District 7
Party	Candidate	Votes	%
Republican	Richard Proehl	7,795	100.00
Total votes		7,795	100.00
Republican hold			

=== District 8 ===
District 8
Party	Candidate	Votes	%
Republican	Chris Croft	12,649	100.00
Total votes		12,649	100.00
Republican hold			

=== District 9 ===
District 9
Party	Candidate	Votes	%
Republican	Kent Thompson	6,879	74.84
Democratic	Alana Cloutier	2,312	25.16
Total votes		9,191	100.00
Republican hold			

=== District 10 ===
District 10
Party	Candidate	Votes	%
Democratic	Christina Haswood	9,446	100.00
Total votes		9,446	100.00
Democratic hold			

=== District 11 ===
District 11
Party	Candidate	Votes	%
Republican	Jim Kelly	7,467	100.00
Total votes		7,467	100.00
Republican hold			

=== District 12 ===
District 12
Party	Candidate	Votes	%
Republican	Doug Blex	8,908	100.00
Total votes		8,908	100.00
Republican hold			

=== District 13 ===
District 13
Party	Candidate	Votes	%
Republican	Joe Newland	7,633	77.20
Democratic	Mark Pringle	2,254	22.80
Total votes		9,887	100.00
Republican hold			

=== District 14 ===
District 14
Party	Candidate	Votes	%
Republican	Charlotte Esau	8,539	52.40
Democratic	Angela Schweller	7,757	47.60
Total votes		16,296	100.00
Republican hold			

=== District 15 ===
District 15
Party	Candidate	Votes	%
Republican	John Toplikar	5,361	51.47
Democratic	Cole Fine	5,054	48.53
Total votes		10,415	100.00
Republican hold			

=== District 16 ===
District 16
Party	Candidate	Votes	%
Democratic	Linda Featherston	7,130	50.24
Republican	Rashard Young	7,063	49.76
Total votes		14,193	100.00
Democratic hold			

=== District 17 ===
District 17
Party	Candidate	Votes	%
Democratic	Jo Ella Hoye	7,058	50.93
Republican	Kristine Sapp	6,356	45.87
Libertarian	Michael Kerner	443	3.20
Total votes		13,857	100.00
Democratic gain from Republican			

=== District 18 ===
District 18
Party	Candidate	Votes	%
Democratic	Cindy Neighbor	7,098	52.35
Republican	Cathy Gordon	6,460	47.65
Total votes		13,558	100.00
Democratic hold			

=== District 19 ===
District 19
Party	Candidate	Votes	%
Democratic	Stephanie Clayton	12,369	100.00
Total votes		12,369	100.00
Democratic gain from Republican			

=== District 20 ===
District 20
Party	Candidate	Votes	%
Democratic	Mari-Lynn Poskin	8,249	51.55
Republican	Jane Dirks	7,752	48.45
Total votes		16,001	100.00
Democratic gain from Republican			

=== District 21 ===
District 21
Party	Candidate	Votes	%
Democratic	Jerry Stogsdill	9,421	61.98
Republican	Bob Reese	5,778	38.02
Total votes		15,199	100.00
Democratic hold			

=== District 22 ===
District 22
Party	Candidate	Votes	%
Democratic	Lindsay Vaughn	8,413	100.00
Total votes		8,413	100.00
Democratic hold			

=== District 23 ===
District 23
Party	Candidate	Votes	%
Democratic	Susan Ruiz	6,069	55.00
Republican	Jeff Shull	4,386	39.75
Libertarian	Matthew Clark	579	5.25
Total votes		11,034	100.00
Democratic hold			

=== District 24 ===
District 24
Party	Candidate	Votes	%
Democratic	Jarrod Ousley	9,545	100.00
Total votes		9,545	100.00
Democratic hold			

=== District 25 ===
District 25
Party	Candidate	Votes	%
Democratic	Rui Xu	12,177	100.00
Total votes		12,177	100.00
Democratic hold			

=== District 26 ===
District 26
Party	Candidate	Votes	%
Republican	Adam Thomas	9,758	61.28
Democratic	W. Michael Shimeall	6,166	38.72
Total votes		15,924	100.00
Republican hold			

=== District 27 ===
District 27
Party	Candidate	Votes	%
Republican	Sean Tarwater	12,119	63.52
Democratic	Sona Patel	6,961	36.48
Total votes		19,080	100.00
Republican hold			

=== District 28 ===
District 28
Party	Candidate	Votes	%
Republican	Carl Turner	7,638	53.15
Democratic	Sally Jercha	6,732	46.85
Total votes		14,370	100.00
Republican hold			

=== District 29 ===
District 29
Party	Candidate	Votes	%
Democratic	Brett Parker	7,636	56.85
Republican	Jerry Clinton	5,795	43.15
Total votes		13,431	100.00
Democratic hold			

=== District 30 ===
District 30
Party	Candidate	Votes	%
Democratic	Brandon Woodard	6,913	52.09
Republican	Laura Williams	6,357	47.91
Total votes		13,270	100.00
Democratic hold			

=== District 31 ===
District 31
Party	Candidate	Votes	%
Democratic	Louis Ruiz	5,211	71.57
Republican	Landon Griffith	2,070	28.43
Total votes		7,281	100.00
Democratic hold			

=== District 32 ===
District 32
Party	Candidate	Votes	%
Democratic	Pam Curtis	2,822	74.66
Republican	Greg Conchola	958	25.34
Total votes		3,780	100.00
Democratic hold			

=== District 33 ===
District 33
Party	Candidate	Votes	%
Democratic	Tom Burroughs	5,156	48.73
Republican	Jordan Mackey	4,398	41.57
Libertarian	Rick Parsons	1,027	9.71
Total votes		10,581	100.00
Democratic hold			

=== District 34 ===
District 34
Party	Candidate	Votes	%
Democratic	Valdenia Winn	5,544	100.00
Total votes		5,544	100.00
Democratic hold			

=== District 35 ===
District 35
Party	Candidate	Votes	%
Democratic	Broderick Henderson	5,694	80.13
Republican	Mark Snelson	1,412	19.87
Total votes		7,106	100.00
Democratic hold			

=== District 36 ===
District 36
Party	Candidate	Votes	%
Democratic	Kathy Wolfe Moore	8,280	62.58
Republican	Mark Gilstrap	4,952	37.42
Total votes		13,232	100.00
Democratic hold			

=== District 37 ===
District 37
Party	Candidate	Votes	%
Democratic	Aaron Coleman (Note: Coleman was elected as a Democrat but changed his affiliation to independent in January 2021 after admitting to allegations of bullying, blackmail and revenge porn from before his election. After a House committee investigation in February 2021, he was allowed to rejoin the Democrats.)	3,649	66.45
Independent	Stan Frownfelter (write-in)	1,222	22.25
Independent	Kristina Smith (write-in)	620	11.29
Total votes		5,491	100.00
Democratic hold			

=== District 38 ===
District 38
Party	Candidate	Votes	%
Republican	Timothy H. Johnson	9,368	63.16
Democratic	Sherri D. Grogan	5,464	36.84
Total votes		14,832	100.00
Republican hold			

=== District 39 ===
District 39
Party	Candidate	Votes	%
Republican	Owen Donohoe	8,511	54.78
Democratic	Les Lampe	7,027	45.22
Total votes		15,538	100.00
Republican hold			

=== District 40 ===
District 40
Party	Candidate	Votes	%
Republican	David French	5,318	54.04
Democratic	Joana Scholtz	4,523	45.96
Total votes		9,841	100.00
Republican hold			

=== District 41 ===
District 41
Party	Candidate	Votes	%
Republican	Pat Proctor	3,846	53.00
Democratic	Mike Griswold	3,411	47.00
Total votes		7,257	100.00
Republican gain from Democratic			

=== District 42 ===
District 42
Party	Candidate	Votes	%
Republican	Lance Neelly	9,652	97.15
Independent	Jim Karleskint (write-in)	283	2.85
Total votes		7,257	100.00
Republican hold			

=== District 43 ===
District 43
Party	Candidate	Votes	%
Republican	Bill Sutton	7,893	64.72
Democratic	Pamela Finley	4,302	35.28
Total votes		12,195	100.00
Republican hold			

=== District 44 ===
District 44
Party	Candidate	Votes	%
Democratic	Barbara Ballard (incumbent)	11,358	100.0%
Total votes		11,358	11,358
Democratic hold			

=== District 45 ===
District 45
Party	Candidate	Votes	%
Democratic	Mike Amyx	14,500	100.0%
Total votes		14,500	100.0%
Democratic hold			

=== District 46 ===
District 46
Party	Candidate	Votes	%
Democratic	Dennis Highberger (incumbent)	9,295	85.97%
Libertarian	Dante Javaheri	1,517	14.03%
Total votes		10,812	100.0%
Democratic hold			

=== District 47 ===
District 47
Party	Candidate	Votes	%
Republican	Ronald Ellis (incumbent)	8,209	71.36%
Democratic	Michael Caddell	3,294	28.64%
Total votes		11,503	100.0%
Republican hold			

=== District 48 ===
District 48
Party	Candidate	Votes	%
Democratic	Jennifer Day (incumbent)	6,911	50.23%
Republican	Terry Frederick	6,849	49.77%
Total votes		13,760	100.0%
Republican hold			

=== District 49 ===
District 49
Party	Candidate	Votes	%
Republican	Megan Lynn (incumbent)	5,546	51.07%
Democratic	Katie Dixon	5,313	48.93%
Total votes		10,859	100.0%
Republican hold			

=== District 50 ===
District 50
Party	Candidate	Votes	%
Republican	Fred Patton (incumbent)	9,901	74.85%
Democratic	Timothy B. Reed	3,326	25.15%
Total votes		13,227	100.0%
Republican hold			

=== District 51 ===
District 51
Party	Candidate	Votes	%
Republican	Ron Highland (incumbent)	11,368	100.0%
Total votes		11,368	100.0%
Republican hold			

=== District 52 ===
District 52
Party	Candidate	Votes	%
Republican	Jesse Borjon	7,957	56.28%
Democratic	Mary Lous Davis	6,182	43.72%
Total votes		14,139	100.0%
Republican hold			

=== District 53 ===
District 53
Party	Candidate	Votes	%
Democratic	Jim Gartner (incumbent)	6,326	54.87%
Republican	Jeff Coen	5,203	45.13%
Total votes		11,529	100.0%
Democratic hold			

=== District 54 ===
District 54
Party	Candidate	Votes	%
Republican	Ken Corbet (incumbent)	8,297	67.87%
Democratic	John Brosz	3,927	32.13%
Total votes		12,224	100.0%
Republican hold			

=== District 55 ===
District 55
Party	Candidate	Votes	%
Democratic	Annie Kuether (incumbent)	5,960	62.90%
Republican	Janlyn Nesbett Tucker	3,516	37.10%
Total votes		9,476	100.0%
Democratic hold			

=== District 56 ===
District 56
Party	Candidate	Votes	%
Democratic	Virgil Weigel (incumbent)	5,661	51.18%
Republican	Tim Clothier	5,400	48.82%
Total votes		11,061	100.0%
Democratic hold			

=== District 57 ===
District 57
Party	Candidate	Votes	%
Democratic	John Alcala (incumbent)	4,513	63.42%
Republican	Michael Martin	2,603	36.58%
Total votes		7,116	100.0%
Democratic hold			

=== District 58 ===
District 58
Party	Candidate	Votes	%
Democratic	Vic Miller	4,786	69.63%
Republican	Geoffrey H. Gawdun	2,087	30.37
Total votes		6,873	100.0%
Democratic hold			

=== District 59 ===
District 59
Party	Candidate	Votes	%
Republican	Blaine Finch (incumbent)	7,679	73.10%
Democratic	Caren Rugg	2,826	26.90%
Total votes		10,505	100.0%
Republican hold			

=== District 60 ===
District 60
Party	Candidate	Votes	%
Republican	Mark Schreiber (incumbent)	5,685	59.32%
Democratic	Todd Maddox	3,898	40.68%
Total votes		9,583	100.0%
Republican hold			

=== District 61 ===
District 61
Party	Candidate	Votes	%
Republican	Francis Awerkamp (incumbent)	9,684	100.0%
Total votes		9,684	100.0%
Republican hold			

=== District 62 ===
District 62
Party	Candidate	Votes	%
Republican	Randy Garber (incumbent)	9,757	100.0%
Total votes		9,757	100.0%
Republican hold			

=== District 63 ===
District 63
Party	Candidate	Votes	%
Republican	John Eplee (incumbent)	9,238	100.0%
Total votes		9,238	100.0%
Republican hold			

=== District 64 ===
District 64
Party	Candidate	Votes	%
Republican	Suzi Carlson (incumbent)	5,050	75.69%
Democratic	Jim Vathauer	1,622	24.31%
Total votes		6,672	100.0%
Republican hold			

=== District 65 ===
District 65
Party	Candidate	Votes	%
Republican	Lonnie Clark (incumbent)	4,345	100.0%
Total votes		4,345	100.0%
Republican hold			

=== District 66 ===
District 66
Party	Candidate	Votes	%
Democratic	Sydney Carlin (incumbent)	7,491	100.0%
Total votes		7,491	100.0%
Democratic hold			

=== District 67 ===
District 67
Party	Candidate	Votes	%
Republican	Mike Dodson	6,928	53.72%
Democratic	Cheryl A. Arthur	5,969	46.28%
Total votes		12,897	100.0%
Republican hold			

=== District 68 ===
District 68
Party	Candidate	Votes	%
Republican	Dave Baker	6,740	72.64%
Democratic	Scott T. Dawson	2,538	27.36%
Total votes		9,278	100.0%
Republican hold			

=== District 69 ===
District 69
Party	Candidate	Votes	%
Republican	Clarke Sanders	4,976	59.00%
Democratic	Ryan Holmquist	3,458	41.00%
Total votes		8,434	100.0%
Republican hold			

=== District 70 ===
District 70
Party	Candidate	Votes	%
Republican	John Barker (incumbent)	8,295	76.61%
Democratic	Jo Schwartz	2,533	23.39%
Total votes		10,828	100.0%
Republican hold			

=== District 71 ===
District 71
Party	Candidate	Votes	%
Republican	Steven Howe	7,169	68.83%
Democratic	Jeffrey A. Zamrzla	3,246	31.17%
Total votes		10,415	100.0%
Republican hold			

=== District 72 ===
District 72
Party	Candidate	Votes	%
Republican	Avery Anderson	6,159	54.92%
Democratic	Tim Hodge (incumbent)	5,056	45.08%
Total votes		11,215	100.0%
Republican gain from Democratic			

=== District 73 ===
District 73
Party	Candidate	Votes	%
Republican	Les Mason (incumbent)	9,761	100.0%
Total votes		9,761	100.0%
Republican hold			

=== District 74 ===
District 74
Party	Candidate	Votes	%
Republican	Stephen Owens (incumbent)	9,204	100.0%
Total votes		9,204	100.0%
Republican hold			

=== District 75 ===
District 75
Party	Candidate	Votes	%
Republican	Will Carpenter (incumbent)	7,146	75.61%
Democratic	Ethan D. Caylor	2,305	24.39%
Total votes		9,451	100.0%
Republican hold			

=== District 76 ===
District 76
Party	Candidate	Votes	%
Republican	Eric Smith (incumbent)	9,413	100.0%
Total votes		9,413	100.0%
Republican hold			

=== District 77 ===
District 77
Party	Candidate	Votes	%
Republican	Kristey Williams (incumbent)	9,601	100.0%
Total votes		9,601	100.0%
Republican hold			

=== District 78 ===
District 78
Party	Candidate	Votes	%
Republican	Ron Ryckman Jr. (incumbent)	6,835	52.36%
Democratic	Kathy Meyer	6,219	47.64%
Total votes		13,054	100.0%
Republican hold			

=== District 79 ===
District 79
Party	Candidate	Votes	%
Republican	Cheryl Helmer (incumbent)	6,208	64.83%
Democratic	Ken White	3,368	35.17%
Total votes		9,576	100.0%
Republican hold			

=== District 80 ===
District 80
Party	Candidate	Votes	%
Republican	Bill Rhiley (incumbent)	7,268	100.0%
Total votes		7,268	100.0%
Republican hold			

=== District 81 ===
District 81
Party	Candidate	Votes	%
Republican	Blake Carpenter (incumbent)	5,478	64.48%
Democratic	Matthew Joyce	3,018	35.52%
Total votes		8,496	100.0%
Republican hold			

=== District 82 ===
District 82
Party	Candidate	Votes	%
Republican	Jesse Burris (incumbent)	7,892	70.13%
Democratic	Edward Hackerott	3,361	29.87%
Total votes		11,253	100.0%
Republican hold			

=== District 83 ===
District 83
Party	Candidate	Votes	%
Democratic	Henry Helgerson (incumbent)	4,536	59.96%
Republican	David Robbins	3,029	40.04%
Total votes		7,565	100.0%
Democratic hold			

=== District 84 ===
District 84
Party	Candidate	Votes	%
Democratic	Gail Finney (incumbent)	5,553	74.06%
Republican	Janet Sue Rine	1,938	25.94%
Total votes		7,491	100.0%
Democratic hold			

=== District 85 ===
District 85
Party	Candidate	Votes	%
Republican	Patrick Penn	8,411	59.93%
Democratic	Marcey Gregory	5,624	40.07%
Total votes		14,035	100.0%
Republican hold			

=== District 86 ===
District 86
Party	Candidate	Votes	%
Democratic	Stephanie Byers	3,616	55.49%
Republican	Cyndi Howerton	2,901	44.51%
Total votes		6,517	100.0%
Democratic hold			

=== District 87 ===
District 87
Party	Candidate	Votes	%
Republican	Susan Estes	6,430	54.38%
Democratic	Matt Fox	5,394	45.62%
Total votes		11,824	100.0%
Republican hold			

=== District 88 ===
District 88
Party	Candidate	Votes	%
Democratic	Elizabeth Bishop	5,923	100.0%
Total votes		5,923	100.0%
Democratic hold			

=== District 89 ===
District 89
Party	Candidate	Votes	%
Democratic	KC Ohaebosim	5,891	61.61%
Republican	Robert W. Herrick Jr.	3,671	38.39%
Total votes		9,562	100.0%
Democratic hold			

=== District 90 ===
District 90
Party	Candidate	Votes	%
Republican	Steve Huebert (incumbent)	10,476	100.0%
Total votes		10,476	100.0%
Republican hold			

=== District 91 ===
District 91
Party	Candidate	Votes	%
Republican	Emil Bergquist (incumbent)	9,585	100.0%
Total votes		9,585	100.0%
Republican hold			

=== District 92 ===
District 92
Party	Candidate	Votes	%
Democratic	John Carmichael (incumbent)	5,254	57.62%
Republican	Patrick McCormack	3,864	42.38%
Total votes		9,118	100.0%
Democratic hold			

=== District 93 ===
District 93
Party	Candidate	Votes	%
Republican	Brian Bergkamp	9,434	100.0%
Total votes		9,434	100.0%
Republican hold			

=== District 94 ===
District 94
Party	Candidate	Votes	%
Republican	Leo Delperdang (incumbent)	8,394	66.84%
Democratic	Derek Milligan	4,164	33.16%
Total votes		12,558	100.0%
Republican hold			

=== District 95 ===
District 95
Party	Candidate	Votes	%
Democratic	Tom Sawyer (incumbent)	3,726	55.50%
Republican	Christopher Parisho	2,988	44.50%
Total votes		6,714	100.0%
Democratic hold			

=== District 96 ===
District 96
Party	Candidate	Votes	%
Republican	Tom Kessler	3,542	53.26%
Democratic	Stephanie Yeager (incumbent)	3,109	46.74%
Total votes		6,651	100.0%
Republican gain from Democratic			

=== District 97 ===
District 97
Party	Candidate	Votes	%
Republican	Nick Hoheisel (incumbent)	5,626	62.30%
Democratic	Kim Webb	3,404	37.70%
Total votes		9,030	100.0%
Republican hold			

=== District 98 ===
District 98
Party	Candidate	Votes	%
Republican	Ron Howard (incumbent)	4,174	56.58%
Democratic	Steven G. Crum	3,203	43.42%
Total votes		7,377	100.0%
Republican hold			

=== District 99 ===
District 99
Party	Candidate	Votes	%
Republican	Susan Humphries (incumbent)	9,860	66.75%
Democratic	Phil Hodson	4,911	33.25%
Total votes		14,771	100.0%
Republican hold			

=== District 100 ===
District 100
Party	Candidate	Votes	%
Republican	Daniel Hawkins (incumbent)	7,976	62.92%
Democratic	Chad Smith	4,700	37.08%
Total votes		12,676	100.0%
Republican hold			

=== District 101 ===
District 101
Party	Candidate	Votes	%
Republican	Joe Seiwert (incumbent)	9,396	74.29%
Democratic	Elliott R. Adams	3,252	25.71%
Total votes		12,648	100.0%
Republican hold			

=== District 102 ===
District 102
Party	Candidate	Votes	%
Democratic	Jason Probst (incumbent)	3,368	50.23%
Republican	John Whitesel	3,337	49.77%
Total votes		6,705	100.0%
Democratic hold			

=== District 103 ===
District 103
Party	Candidate	Votes	%
Democratic	Ponka-We Victors (incumbent)	2,615	61.21%
Republican	Susanne Haynes	1,358	31.79%
Libertarian	Loren John Hermreck	299	7.0%
Total votes		4,272	100.0%
Democratic hold			

=== District 104 ===
District 104
Party	Candidate	Votes	%
Republican	Paul Waggoner (incumbent)	7,583	62.93%
Democratic	Garth Strand	4,466	37.07%
Total votes		12,049	100.0%
Republican hold			

=== District 105 ===
District 105
Party	Candidate	Votes	%
Republican	Brenda Landwehr (incumbent)	5,563	59.07%
Democratic	Michelle Snyder	3,855	40.93%
Total votes		9,418	100.0%
Republican hold			

=== District 106 ===
District 106
Party	Candidate	Votes	%
Republican	Lisa Moser	8,374	75.13%
Democratic	James L. Swim	2,772	24.87%
Total votes		11,146	100.0%
Republican hold			

=== District 107 ===
District 107
Party	Candidate	Votes	%
Republican	Susan Concannon (incumbent)	9,863	100.0%
Total votes		9,863	100.0%
Republican hold			

=== District 108 ===
District 108
Party	Candidate	Votes	%
Republican	Steven C. Johnson (incumbent)	9,592	100.0%
Total votes		9,592	100.0%
Republican hold			

=== District 109 ===
District 109
Party	Candidate	Votes	%
Republican	Troy Waymaster (incumbent)	10,414	100.0%
Total votes		10,414	100.0%
Republican hold			

=== District 110 ===
District 110
Party	Candidate	Votes	%
Republican	Ken Rahjes (incumbent)	9,827	100.0%
Total votes		9,827	100.0%
Republican hold			

=== District 111 ===
District 111
Party	Candidate	Votes	%
Republican	Barbara Wasinger (incumbent)	7,343	63.97%
Democratic	Eber Phelps	4,135	36.03%
Total votes		11,478	100.0%
Republican hold			

=== District 112 ===
District 112
Party	Candidate	Votes	%
Republican	Tory Marie Arnberger (incumbent)	10,414	100.0%
Total votes		10,414	100.0%
Republican hold			

=== District 113 ===
District 113
Party	Candidate	Votes	%
Republican	Brett Fairchild	8,165	100.0%
Total votes		8,165	100.0%
Republican hold			

=== District 114 ===
District 114
Party	Candidate	Votes	%
Republican	Michael Murphy	7,428	70.57%
Democratic	Jeff Stroberg	3,097	29.43%
Total votes		10,525	100.0%
Republican hold			

=== District 115 ===
District 115
Party	Candidate	Votes	%
Republican	Boyd Orr (incumbent)	6,646	100.0%
Total votes		6,646	100.0%
Republican hold			

=== District 116 ===
District 116
Party	Candidate	Votes	%
Republican	Kyle Hoffman (incumbent)	7,809	77.17%
Democratic	Rick Roitman	2,310	22.83%
Total votes		10,119	100.0%
Republican hold			

=== District 117 ===
He died in office on September 30, 2020, but still remained on the ballot.

District 117
Party	Candidate	Votes	%
Republican	Leonard Mastroni (incumbent)	8,092	100.0%
Total votes		8,092	100.0%
Republican hold			

=== District 118 ===
District 118
Party	Candidate	Votes	%
Republican	Jim Minnix	10,217	100.0%
Total votes		10,217	100.0%
Republican hold			

=== District 119 ===
District 119
Party	Candidate	Votes	%
Republican	Bradley Ralph (incumbent)	3,312	60.70%
Democratic	Jan Scoggins	2,144	39.30%
Total votes		5,456	100.0%
Republican hold			

=== District 120 ===
District 120
Party	Candidate	Votes	%
Republican	Adam Smith	10,171	100.0%
Total votes		10,171	100.0%
Republican hold			

=== District 121 ===
District 121
Party	Candidate	Votes	%
Republican	John Resman (incumbent)	10,040	59.18%
Democratic	James Rexford	6,924	40.82%
Total votes		16,964	100.0%
Republican hold			

=== District 122 ===
District 122
Party	Candidate	Votes	%
Republican	Russell Jennings (incumbent)	6,808	100.0%
Total votes		6,808	100.0%
Republican hold			

=== District 123 ===
District 123
Party	Candidate	Votes	%
Republican	John Wheeler (incumbent)	6,090	100.0%
Total votes		6,090	100.0%
Republican hold			

=== District 124 ===
District 124
Party	Candidate	Votes	%
Republican	Marty Long (incumbent)	6,977	100.0%
Total votes		6,977	100.0%
Republican hold			

=== District 125 ===
District 125
Party	Candidate	Votes	%
Republican	Shannon Francis (incumbent)	4,490	100.0%
Total votes		4,490	100.0%
Republican hold			
