= 2022 Kansas House of Representatives election =

- November 8, 2022

All 125 seats in the Kansas House of Representatives 63 seats needed for a majority

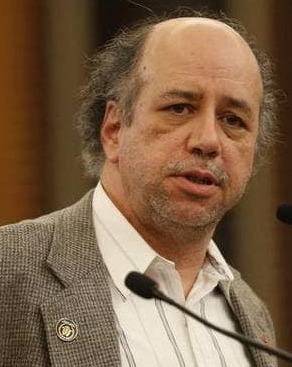
	Majority party	Minority party
Leader	Daniel Hawkins	Tom Sawyer
Party	Republican	Democratic
Leader's seat	100th district	95th district
Seats before	86	39
Seats won	85	40
Seat change	▼1	▲1
Popular vote	566,412	334,211
Percentage	62.57%	36.92%
Swing	▲0.65%	▼0.69%
- Republican gain Democratic gain Republican hold Democratic hold 50–60% 60–70% 70–80% 80–90% >90% 50–60% 60–70% 70–80% 80–90% >90%
Speaker before election
Ron Ryckman Jr.
Republican
Elected Speaker
Daniel Hawkins
Republican

The 2022 Kansas House of Representatives elections took place as a part of the 2022 United States elections. All 125 seats in the Kansas House of Representatives were up for re-election. Representatives serve two year terms and are not term limited.

Democrats gained 1 seat, decreasing the narrow Republican supermajority to 85 out of 125 seats.

== Results summary ==
-
Party	Votes	%	Seats	+/–	%
Republican Party	566,412	62.57%	85	-1	68%
Democratic Party	334,211	36.92%	40	+1	32%
Libertarian Party	4,584	0.50%	0	–	0%
Total	905,207	100%	125	–	

== Predictions ==
Source	Ranking	As of
Sabato's Crystal Ball	Safe R	May 19, 2022

== Close races ==
Districts where the margin of victory was under 10%:

1. District 28, 0.58%
2. District 15, 1.36%
3. District 49, 1.54% (flip)
4. District 30, 1.58%
5. District 88, 1.92% (flip)
6. District 14, 2% (flip)
7. District 39, 2.08%
8. District 48, 2.66%
9. District 117, 2.88%
10. District 41, 3.2%
11. District 67, 4.82%
12. District 102, 4.88%
13. District 33, 5.6% (flip)
14. District 78, 7%
15. District 121, 8.22%
16. District 16, 8.46%
17. District 8, 8.96%
18. District 17, 9.06%

== Results ==
=== District 1 ===
District 1
Party	Candidate	Votes	%
Republican	Michael Houser	5,847	75.20
Democratic	Paul Rogers	1,928	24.80
Total votes		7,775	100.00

=== District 2 ===
District 2
Party	Candidate	Votes	%
Republican	Ken Collins	6,566	100.00
Total votes		6,566	100.00

=== District 3 ===
District 3
Party	Candidate	Votes	%
Republican	Chuck Smith	4,714	100.00
Total votes		4,714	100.00

=== District 4 ===
District 4
Party	Candidate	Votes	%
Republican	Trevor Jacobs	7,069	100.00
Total votes		7,069	100.00

=== District 5 ===
District 5
Party	Candidate	Votes	%
Republican	Carrie Barth	7,085	100.00
Total votes		7,085	100.00

=== District 6 ===
District 6
Party	Candidate	Votes	%
Republican	Samantha Poetter	6,265	67.96
Democratic	Nina Fricke	2,954	32.04
Total votes		9,219	100.00

=== District 7 ===
District 7
Party	Candidate	Votes	%
Republican	Dan Goddard	5,789	100.00
Total votes		5,789	100.00

=== District 8 ===
District 8
Party	Candidate	Votes	%
Republican	Chris Croft	5,451	54.48
Democratic	Pam Shernuk	4,555	45.52
Total votes		10,006	100.00

=== District 9 ===
District 9
Party	Candidate	Votes	%
Republican	Fred Gardner	6,101	74.15
Democratic	Alana Cloutier	2,127	25.85
Total votes		8,228	100.00

=== District 10 ===
District 10
Party	Candidate	Votes	%
Democratic	Christina Haswood	6,695	100.00
Total votes		6,695	100.00

=== District 11 ===
District 11
Party	Candidate	Votes	%
Republican	Ron Bryce	5,104	74.88
Democratic	Gregory Wilkinson	1,712	25.12
Total votes		6,816	100.00

=== District 12 ===
District 12
Party	Candidate	Votes	%
Republican	Doug Blex	7,674	100.00
Total votes		7,674	100.00

=== District 13 ===
District 13
Party	Candidate	Votes	%
Republican	Joe Newland	7,742	100.00
Total votes		7,742	100.00

=== District 14 ===
District 14
Party	Candidate	Votes	%
Democratic	Dennis Miller	5,647	51.00
Republican	Charlotte Esau	5,426	49.00
Total votes		11,073	100.00

=== District 15 ===
District 15
Party	Candidate	Votes	%
Democratic	Allison Hougland	2,915	50.68
Republican	Matt Bingesser	2,837	49.32
Total votes		5,752	100.00

=== District 16 ===
District 16
Party	Candidate	Votes	%
Democratic	Linda Featherston	5,970	54.23
Republican	Ed Roitz	5,039	45.77
Total votes		11,009	100.00

=== District 17 ===
District 17
Party	Candidate	Votes	%
Democratic	Jo Ella Hoye	6,139	53.58
Republican	Emily Carpenter	5,102	44.53
Libertarian	Michael Kerner	217	1.89
Total votes		11,458	100.00

=== District 18 ===
District 18
Party	Candidate	Votes	%
Democratic	Cindy Neighbor	5,746	57.34
Republican	Cathy Gordon	4,275	42.66
Total votes		10,021	100.00

=== District 19 ===
District 19
Party	Candidate	Votes	%
Democratic	Stephanie Clayton	8,027	61.99
Republican	Nicholas Reddell	4,922	38.01
Total votes		12,949	100.00

=== District 20 ===
District 20
Party	Candidate	Votes	%
Democratic	Mari-Lynn Poskin	7,048	55.70
Republican	Carrie Rahfaldt	5,606	44.30
Total votes		12,654	100.00

=== District 21 ===
District 21
Party	Candidate	Votes	%
Democratic	Jerry Stogsdill	9,143	100.00
Total votes		9,143	100.00

=== District 22 ===
District 22
Party	Candidate	Votes	%
Democratic	Lindsay Vaughn	5,574	65.03
Republican	Robert "Chris" Colburn	2,997	34.97
Total votes		8,571	100.00

=== District 23 ===
District 23
Party	Candidate	Votes	%
Democratic	Susan Ruiz	6,115	100.00
Total votes		6,115	100.00

=== District 24 ===
District 24
Party	Candidate	Votes	%
Democratic	Jarrod Ousley	6,733	100.00
Total votes		6,733	100.00

=== District 25 ===
District 25
Party	Candidate	Votes	%
Democratic	Rui Xu	9,766	100.00
Total votes		9,766	100.00

=== District 26 ===
District 26
Party	Candidate	Votes	%
Republican	Adam Thomas	5,766	59.30
Democratic	Cheron Tiffany	3,958	40.70
Total votes		9,724	100.00

=== District 27 ===
District 27
Party	Candidate	Votes	%
Republican	Sean Tarwater	6,648	57.34
Democratic	Christi Pribula	4,945	42.66
Total votes		11,593	100.00

=== District 28 ===
District 28
Party	Candidate	Votes	%
Republican	Carl Turner	5,151	50.29
Democratic	Ace Allen	5,091	49.71
Total votes		10,242	100.00

=== District 29 ===
District 29
Party	Candidate	Votes	%
Democratic	Heather Meyer	5,558	57.16
Republican	David Soffer	4,166	42.84
Total votes		9,724	100.00

=== District 30 ===
District 30
Party	Candidate	Votes	%
Republican	Laura Williams	4,499	50.79
Democratic	Courtney Eiterich	4,359	49.21
Total votes		8,858	100.00

=== District 31 ===
District 31
Party	Candidate	Votes	%
Democratic	Louis Ruiz	3,290	73.77
Republican	Dennis Grindel	1,170	26.23
Total votes		4,460	100.00

=== District 32 ===
District 32
Party	Candidate	Votes	%
Democratic	Pam Curtis	1,857	100.00
Total votes		1,857	100.00

=== District 33 ===
District 33
Party	Candidate	Votes	%
Republican	Mike Thompson	3,350	51.44
Democratic	Bill Hutton	2,983	45.80
Libertarian	Stephanie Barton	180	2.76
Total votes		6,513	100.00

=== District 34 ===
District 34
Party	Candidate	Votes	%
Democratic	Valdenia Winn	2,572	79.43
Republican	Pepe Cabrera	666	20.57
Total votes		3,238	100.00

=== District 35 ===
District 35
Party	Candidate	Votes	%
Democratic	Marvin Robinson II	3,290	80.13
Republican	Sam Stillwell	816	19.87
Total votes		4,106	100.00

=== District 36 ===
District 36
Party	Candidate	Votes	%
Democratic	Lynn Melton	4,999	62.29
Republican	Kevin Braun	3,027	37.71
Total votes		8,026	100.00

=== District 37 ===
District 37
Party	Candidate	Votes	%
Democratic	Melissa Oropeza	2,944	61.84
Republican	Diana Whittington	1,834	38.16
Total votes		4,846	100.00

=== District 38 ===
District 38
Party	Candidate	Votes	%
Republican	Timothy H. Johnson	7,832	100.00
Total votes		7,832	100.00

=== District 39 ===
District 39
Party	Candidate	Votes	%
Republican	Owen Donohoe	5,052	51.04
Democratic	Vanessa Vaughn West	4,847	48.96
Total votes		9,899	100.00

=== District 40 ===
District 40
Party	Candidate	Votes	%
Republican	David Buehler	3,999	55.38
Democratic	Martha Allen	3,222	44.62
Total votes		7,221	100.00

=== District 41 ===
District 41
Party	Candidate	Votes	%
Republican	Pat Proctor	2,324	51.60
Democratic	Harry Schwarz	2,180	48.40
Total votes		4,504	100.00

=== District 42 ===
District 42
Party	Candidate	Votes	%
Republican	Lance Neelly	6,705	100.00
Total votes		6,705	100.00

=== District 43 ===
District 43
Party	Candidate	Votes	%
Republican	Bill Sutton	4,202	58.07
Democratic	Keith Davenport	3,034	41.93
Total votes		7,236	100.00

=== District 44 ===
District 44
Party	Candidate	Votes	%
Democratic	Barbara Ballard	8,890	100.00
Total votes		8,890	100.00

=== District 45 ===
District 45
Party	Candidate	Votes	%
Democratic	Mike Amyx	9,613	100.00
Total votes		9,613	100.00

=== District 46 ===
District 46
Party	Candidate	Votes	%
Democratic	Dennis Highberger	5,715	100.00
Total votes		5,715	100.00

=== District 47 ===
District 47
Party	Candidate	Votes	%
Republican	Ronald Ellis	7,819	100.00
Total votes		7,819	100.00

=== District 48 ===
District 48
Party	Candidate	Votes	%
Democratic	Dan Osman	5,161	51.33
Republican	Terry Frederick	4,894	48.67
Total votes		10,005	100.00

=== District 49 ===
District 49
Party	Candidate	Votes	%
Democratic	Brad Boyd	4,789	50.77
Republican	Kristin Clark	4,643	49.23
Total votes		9,432	100.00

=== District 50 ===
District 50
Party	Candidate	Votes	%
Republican	Fred Patton	8,918	100.00
Total votes		8,918	100.00

=== District 51 ===
District 51
Party	Candidate	Votes	%
Republican	Kenny Titus	7,702	100.00
Total votes		7,702	100.00

=== District 52 ===
District 52
Party	Candidate	Votes	%
Republican	Jesse Borjon	6,426	56.30
Democratic	Derik Flerlage	4,987	43.70
Total votes		11,413	100.00

=== District 53 ===
District 53
Party	Candidate	Votes	%
Democratic	Kirk Haskins	4,948	55.37
Republican	Bruce Williamson	3,988	44.63
Total votes		8,936	100.00

=== District 54 ===
District 54
Party	Candidate	Votes	%
Republican	Ken Corbet	6,446	66.61
Democratic	Lyndon Johnson	3,231	33.39
Total votes		9,677	100.00

=== District 55 ===
District 55
Party	Candidate	Votes	%
Democratic	Tobias Schlingensiepen	4,853	65.61
Republican	Todd Staerkel	2,544	34.39
Total votes		7,397	100.00

=== District 56 ===
District 56
Party	Candidate	Votes	%
Democratic	Virgil Weigel	6,349	100.00
Total votes		6,349	100.00

=== District 57 ===
District 57
Party	Candidate	Votes	%
Democratic	John Alcala	4,221	100.00
Total votes		4,221	100.00

=== District 58 ===
District 58
Party	Candidate	Votes	%
Democratic	Vic Miller	4,455	100.00
Total votes		4,455	100.00

=== District 59 ===
District 59
Party	Candidate	Votes	%
Republican	Rebecca Schmoe	5,344	64.53
Democratic	Darrell McCune	2,937	35.37
Total votes		8,281	100.00

=== District 60 ===
District 60
Party	Candidate	Votes	%
Republican	Mark Schreiber	3,649	55.27
Democratic	Mic McGuire	2,953	44.73
Total votes		6,602	100.00

=== District 61 ===
District 61
Party	Candidate	Votes	%
Republican	Francis Awerkamp	6,677	100.00
Total votes		6,677	100.00

=== District 62 ===
District 62
Party	Candidate	Votes	%
Republican	Randy Garber	7,872	100.00
Total votes		7,782	100.00

=== District 63 ===
District 63
Party	Candidate	Votes	%
Republican	John Eplee	7,116	100.00
Total votes		7,116	100.00

=== District 64 ===
District 64
Party	Candidate	Votes	%
Republican	Lewis "Bill" Bloom	5,721	77.34
Democratic	Patricia Smetana	1,676	22.66
Total votes		7,397	100.00

=== District 65 ===
District 65
Party	Candidate	Votes	%
Republican	Jeff Underhill	3,121	100.00
Total votes		3,121	100.00

=== District 66 ===
District 66
Party	Candidate	Votes	%
Democratic	Sydney Carlin	3,317	100.00
Total votes		3,317	100.00

=== District 67 ===
District 67
Party	Candidate	Votes	%
Republican	Mike Dodson	4,559	52.41
Democratic	Kim Zito	4,139	47.59
Total votes		8,698	100.00

=== District 68 ===
District 68
Party	Candidate	Votes	%
Republican	Nate Butler	3,207	67.77
Democratic	Michael Seymour II	1,525	32.23
Total votes		4,732	100.00

=== District 69 ===
District 69
Party	Candidate	Votes	%
Republican	Clarke Sanders	4,747	65.00
Democratic	Sarah Crews	2,556	35.00
Total votes		7,303	100.00

=== District 70 ===
District 70
Party	Candidate	Votes	%
Republican	Scott Hill	7,460	100.00
Total votes		7,460	100.00

=== District 71 ===
District 71
Party	Candidate	Votes	%
Republican	Steven Howe	7,096	100.00
Total votes		7,096	100.00

=== District 72 ===
District 72
Party	Candidate	Votes	%
Republican	Avery Anderson	6,325	100.00
Total votes		6,325	100.00

=== District 73 ===
District 73
Party	Candidate	Votes	%
Republican	Les Mason	7,258	100.00
Total votes		7,258	100.00

=== District 74 ===
District 74
Party	Candidate	Votes	%
Republican	Stephen Owens	6,414	76.80
Libertarian	Henry Hein	1,938	23.20
Total votes		8,352	100.00

=== District 75 ===
District 75
Party	Candidate	Votes	%
Republican	Will Carpenter	6,813	100.00
Total votes		6,813	100.00

=== District 76 ===
District 76
Party	Candidate	Votes	%
Republican	Eric Smith	6,623	72.82
Democratic	Chuck Torres	2,472	27.18
Total votes		9,095	100.00

=== District 77 ===
District 77
Party	Candidate	Votes	%
Republican	Kristey Williams	6,753	100.00
Total votes		6,753	100.00

=== District 78 ===
District 78
Party	Candidate	Votes	%
Republican	Robyn Essex	5,030	53.50
Democratic	W. Michael Shimeall	4,371	46.50
Total votes		9,401	100.00

=== District 79 ===
District 79
Party	Candidate	Votes	%
Republican	Webster Roth	5,244	63.43
Democratic	Kris Trimmer	3,024	36.57
Total votes		8,268	100.00

=== District 80 ===
District 80
Party	Candidate	Votes	%
Republican	Bill Rhiley	5,409	100.00
Total votes		5,409	100.00

=== District 81 ===
District 81
Party	Candidate	Votes	%
Republican	Blake Carpenter	4,231	100.00
Total votes		4,231	100.00

=== District 82 ===
District 82
Party	Candidate	Votes	%
Republican	Leah Howell	5,453	65.48
Democratic	Misti Hobbs	2,875	34.52
Total votes		8,328	100.00

=== District 83 ===
District 83
Party	Candidate	Votes	%
Democratic	Henry Helgerson	3,695	100.00
Total votes		3,695	100.00

=== District 84 ===
District 84
Party	Candidate	Votes	%
Democratic	Ford Carr	4,067	100.00
Total votes		4,067	100.00

=== District 85 ===
District 85
Party	Candidate	Votes	%
Republican	Patrick Penn	5,064	57.02
Democratic	Jalon Britton	3,817	42.98
Total votes		8,881	100.00

=== District 86 ===
District 86
Party	Candidate	Votes	%
Democratic	Silas Miller	2,527	57.79
Republican	Rick Lindsey	1,846	42.21
Total votes		4,373	100.00

=== District 87 ===
District 87
Party	Candidate	Votes	%
Republican	Susan Estes	4,890	55.72
Democratic	Chris Strong	3,886	44.28
Total votes		8,776	100.00

=== District 88 ===
District 88
Party	Candidate	Votes	%
Republican	Sandy Pickert	3,022	50.96
Democratic	Chuck Schmidt	2,908	49.04
Total votes		5,930	100.00

=== District 89 ===
District 88
Party	Candidate	Votes	%
Democratic	KC Ohaebosim	4,547	100.00
Total votes		4,547	100.00

=== District 90 ===
District 90
Party	Candidate	Votes	%
Republican	Carl Maughan	6,683	100.00
Total votes		6,683	100.00

=== District 91 ===
District 91
Party	Candidate	Votes	%
Republican	Emil Bergquist	5,826	64.04
Democratic	Brooke Chong	2,962	32.56
Libertarian	Steve Baird	309	3.40
Total votes		8,976	100.00

=== District 92 ===
District 92
Party	Candidate	Votes	%
Democratic	John Carmichael	4,752	100.00
Total votes		4,752	100.00

=== District 93 ===
District 93
Party	Candidate	Votes	%
Republican	Brian Bergkamp	6,646	100.00
Total votes		6,646	100.00

=== District 94 ===
District 94
Party	Candidate	Votes	%
Republican	Leo Delperdang	5,840	64.16
Democratic	Robert Howes	3,262	35.84
Total votes		9,102	100.00

=== District 95 ===
District 95
Party	Candidate	Votes	%
Democratic	Tom Sawyer	2,433	56.00
Republican	Christopher Parisho	1,912	44.00
Total votes		4,345	100.00

=== District 96 ===
District 96
Party	Candidate	Votes	%
Republican	Tom Kessler	2,648	100.00
Total votes		-	100.00

=== District 97 ===
District 97
Party	Candidate	Votes	%
Republican	Nick Hoheisel	4,289	100.00
Total votes		4,289	100.00

=== District 98 ===
District 98
Party	Candidate	Votes	%
Republican	Cyndi Howerton	3,627	100.00
Total votes		3,627	100.00

=== District 99 ===
District 99
Party	Candidate	Votes	%
Republican	Susan Humphries	7,273	100.00
Total votes		7,273	100.00

=== District 100 ===
District 100
Party	Candidate	Votes	%
Republican	Daniel Hawkins	5,641	59.70
Democratic	Mike McCorkle	3,808	40.30
Total votes		9,449	100.00

=== District 101 ===
District 101
Party	Candidate	Votes	%
Republican	Joe Seiwert	7,501	100.00
Total votes		7,501	100.00

=== District 102 ===
District 102
Party	Candidate	Votes	%
Democratic	Jason Probst	2,719	52.44
Republican	John Whitesel	2,466	47.56
Total votes		5,185	100.00

=== District 103 ===
District 103
Party	Candidate	Votes	%
Democratic	Angela Martinez	1,717	73.60
Libertarian	Loren John Hermreck	616	26.40
Total votes		2,333	100.00

=== District 104 ===
District 104
Party	Candidate	Votes	%
Republican	Paul Waggoner	6,003	60.57
Democratic	Garth Strand	3,908	39.43
Total votes		9,911	100.00

=== District 105 ===
District 105
Party	Candidate	Votes	%
Republican	Brenda Landwehr	3,788	58.30
Democratic	Jaelynn Abegg	2,709	41.70
Total votes		6,497	100.00

=== District 106 ===
District 106
Party	Candidate	Votes	%
Republican	Lisa Moser	8,302	100.00
Total votes		8,302	100.00

=== District 107 ===
District 107
Party	Candidate	Votes	%
Republican	Susan Concannon	7,570	100.00
Total votes		7,570	100.00

=== District 108 ===
District 108
Party	Candidate	Votes	%
Democratic	Brandon Woodard	6,753	100.00
Total votes		6,753	100.00

=== District 109 ===
District 109
Party	Candidate	Votes	%
Republican	Troy Waymaster	7,698	85.32
Libertarian	Peter Solie	1,324	14.68
Total votes		9,022	100.00

=== District 110 ===
District 110
Party	Candidate	Votes	%
Republican	Ken Rahjes	8,366	100.00
Total votes		8,366	100.00

=== District 111 ===
District 111
Party	Candidate	Votes	%
Republican	Barbara Wasinger	5,038	60.49
Democratic	Edward Hammond	3,291	39.51
Total votes		8,329	100.00

=== District 112 ===
District 112
Party	Candidate	Votes	%
Republican	Tory Blew	6,074	100.00
Total votes		6,074	100.00

=== District 113 ===
District 113
Party	Candidate	Votes	%
Republican	Brett Fairchild	6,610	75.99
Democratic	Jo Ann Roth	2,089	24.01
Total votes		8,699	100.00

=== District 114 ===
District 114
Party	Candidate	Votes	%
Republican	Michael Murphy	7,768	100.00
Total votes		7,768	100.00

=== District 115 ===
District 115
Party	Candidate	Votes	%
Republican	Gary White	6,738	100.00
Total votes		6,738	100.00

=== District 116 ===
District 116
Party	Candidate	Votes	%
Republican	Kyle Hoffman	6,996	79.38
Democratic	Kristen Barger	1,817	20.62
Total votes		8,813	100.00

=== District 117 ===
District 117
Party	Candidate	Votes	%
Republican	Adam Turk	5,813	51.94
Democratic	Courtney Tripp	5,378	48.06
Total votes		11,191	100.00

=== District 118 ===
District 118
Party	Candidate	Votes	%
Republican	Jim Minnix	8,414	100.00
Total votes		8,414	100.00

=== District 119 ===
District 119
Party	Candidate	Votes	%
Republican	Jason Goetz	2,213	100.00
Total votes		2,213	100.00

=== District 120 ===
District 120
Party	Candidate	Votes	%
Republican	Adam Smith	8,120	100.00
Total votes		8,120	100.00

=== District 121 ===
District 121
Party	Candidate	Votes	%
Republican	John Resman	4,972	54.61
Democratic	Mel Pinick	4,133	45.39
Total votes		9,105	100.00

=== District 122 ===
District 122
Party	Candidate	Votes	%
Republican	Bill Clifford	4,465	100.00
Total votes		4,465	100.00

=== District 123 ===
District 123
Party	Candidate	Votes	%
Republican	Bob Lewis	3,746	100.00
Total votes		3,746	100.00

=== District 124 ===
District 124
Party	Candidate	Votes	%
Republican	David Younger	5,350	100.00
Total votes		5,350	100.00

=== District 125 ===
District 125
Party	Candidate	Votes	%
Republican	Shannon Francis	2,859	100.00
Total votes		2,859	100.00

== See also ==
- Elections in Kansas
