= Boyd Orr =

Boyd Orr may refer to:

- John Boyd Orr (1880–1971), Scottish teacher, doctor, biologist and Nobel Peace Prize recipient
- Boyd Orr (politician) (born 1945), American politician in the Kansas House of Representatives
