= Angela Martinez =

Angela Martinez may refer to:

- Angela Martinez (politician), member of the Kansas House of Representatives
- Angela M. Martinez, American lawyer and judge
- Angie Martinez, American radio personality, podcaster, singer, rapper and actress
