= Lisa Moser =

Lisa Moser may refer to:

- Lisa-Maria Moser (born 1991), Austrian tennis player
- Lisa Moser (politician), American businesswoman and member of the Kansas House of Representatives
