= Freda Warfield =

American politician

Member of the Kansas House of Representatives from the 58th district
- In office January 14, 2019 – January 11, 2021
- Preceded by: Vic Miller
- Succeeded by: Vic Miller

Personal details
- Party: Democratic

Freda Warfield is an American politician who served as a member of the Kansas House of Representatives, as the representative of the 58th district in Topeka, Kansas, from 2019 to 2021. She was selected by Democratic Party precinct committee members on December 27, 2018, to succeed Democratic Rep. Vic Miller, who had been picked by precinct committee members to succeed Democratic Sen. Laura Kelly, who was resigning from the Senate after her election as Governor of Kansas. Warfield's election was to fill the two-year term Miller had won in the 2018 election.

Warfield defeated former Rep. Ben Scott by a vote of 20–4 to succeed Miller in the House of Representatives. Warfield is a retired employee of the Kansas Department of Revenue. She did not seek reelection in 2020.

2019–2020 Kansas House of Representatives Committee assignments

- Agriculture and Natural Resources Budget
- Veterans and Military
- Taxation

Preceded by Vic Miller	Kansas House of Representatives; Representative for the 58th district 2019–2021	Succeeded by Vic Miller
