= Laura Williams (politician) =

American politician

Member of the Kansas House of Representatives from the 30th district
- Incumbent
- Assumed office January 9, 2023
- Preceded by: Brandon Woodard

Personal details
- Born: Houston
- Party: Republican
- Spouse: Married
- Children: 2
- Education: Bachelor's degree
- Alma mater: University of Kansas
- Profession: Digital marketing
- Website: www.LauraWilliamsforKansas.com

Laura Williams is an American politician who has served in the Kansas House of Representatives from the 30th district since January 9, 2023. She ran for the seat in 2020, but lost to democratic opponent Brandon Woodard. She owns Wilde Creative Company, a digital marketing agency.

In 2024, Williams introduced legislation along with Linda Featherston to eliminate patient out-of-pocket costs for medically necessary diagnostic and supplemental MRIs, ultrasounds, and mammograms to detect breast cancer.
