= Doug Gatewood =

American politician (born 1955)

Member of the Kansas House of Representatives from the 1st district
- In office January 11, 1999 – January 14, 2013
- Preceded by: Tim Shallenburger
- Succeeded by: Michael Houser

Personal details
- Born: November 16, 1955 (age 70) Columbus, Kansas
- Party: Democratic
- Spouse: Crystal

Doug Gatewood (born November 16, 1955) is an American Democratic politician in the state of Kansas. He served as a member of the Kansas House of Representatives, representing the 1st district from 1999 to 2012. First elected to the House in 1998, he has previously served as mayor and city council member in Columbus and city council in Galena, Kansas.

Governor Kathleen Sebelius appointed Gatewood to serve on the Kansas Technology Enterprise Corporation, which encourages technology based economic development. Additionally, he has been a small business owner for over 30 years and has also been active in the local Chamber of Commerce and the Lions Club.
