= Bill Pannbacker =

American politician

Member of the Kansas House of Representatives from the 106th district
- In office January 14, 2019 – January 11, 2021
- Preceded by: Clay Aurand
- Succeeded by: Lisa Moser

Personal details
- Party: Republican

Bill Pannbacker is an American politician who served as a member of the Kansas House of Representatives for the 106th district from 2019 to 2021. Pannbacker is also a farmer and stockman. Pannbacker did not seek re-election in 2020 and left office after a single term in January 2021.

Pannbacker is a resident of Washington, Kansas.
