= Scott Hill (politician) =

American politician

Member of the Kansas Senate from the 24th district
- Incumbent
- Assumed office June 26, 2025
- Preceded by: J. R. Claeys

Member of the Kansas House of Representatives from the 70th district
- In office January 9, 2023 – June 26, 2025
- Preceded by: John Barker
- Succeeded by: Greg Wilson

Personal details
- Party: Republican

Scott Hill is an American politician. He has served as a member of the Kansas Senate since 2025, representing the 24th district. He previously served in the Kansas House of Representatives from 2023 to 2025, representing the 70th district. He is a member of the Republican Party. Hill was appointed to the Kansas Senate in June 2025 after J. R. Claeys was appointed Administrator of the Rural Business-Cooperative Service at the USDA.
