= Reed Krewson =

American politician

Member of the Kansas House of Representatives from the 22nd district
- Incumbent
- Assumed office January 11, 2027
- Preceded by: Lindsay Vaughn

Personal details
- Party: Democratic
- Education: Kansas State University (BA) University of Kansas (MPA)

Reed Krewson is an American administrator and politician who is a member-elect of the Kansas House of Representatives from the 22nd district. Elected in the November 2026 election, he will assume office on January 11, 2027. He is a Democrat.

== Early life and education ==
Krewson graduated from Blue Valley Southwest High School. He earned a Bachelor of Arts degree in political science and Spanish from Kansas State University. Krewson is a 2019 alumnus of American Legion Boys' State of Kansas. He also has earned a Master of Public Administration from the University of Kansas.

== Career ==
Krewson has worked as an administrative services manager for Overland Park Parks and Recreation, especially focusing on long-range planning. He has also served as the President of the Kansas Young Democrats and Johnson County Young Democrats.

In the November 2026 election, Krewson ran unopposed for his seat in both the primary and the general election. His predecessor, Lindsay Vaughn, served as the treasurer for his campaign.

As of 2026, Krewson will be the youngest member of the Kansas House of Representatives.
