= Dawn Wolf =

American politician

Member of the Kansas House of Representatives from the 107th district
- Incumbent
- Assumed office January 13, 2025
- Preceded by: Susan Concannon

Personal details
- Party: Republican
- Profession: School district employee
- Website: House Website

Dawn Wolf is an American politician from Kansas who currently represents the 107th district of the Kansas House of Representatives. She is a Republican.

== Biography ==
Wolf worked as an online-coordinator for the Twin Valley USD 240 and two terms as a commissioner of Ottawa County.

=== State representative ===
Wolf ran to replace the retiring incumbent Republican Susan Concannon in the 107th district, touting herself as a "champion for local control." Wolf was endorsed by the Kansas Farm Bureau, a lobbying group for farmers, and its PAC "Elect Farm Bureau Friends," and would face Gerald Johnson during the primaries. Johnson, a combat veteran, had previously challenged Concannon in 2022, and Concannon would endorse Wolf. Wolf would beat Johnson with 2,051 votes to his 1,748 votes, and would be unopposed during the general election.

== Personal life ==
Dawn is married to Tim Wolf and the couple have four children and nine grandchildren and are protestant.
