= Zach Maier =

American politician

Member-elect of the Kansas House of Representatives from the 39th district
- Assuming office January 11, 2027
- Succeeding: Angela Stiens

Personal details
- Party: Democratic
- Children: 2
- Education: Kansas State University
- Website: Campaign website

Zach Maier is an American politician and businessman who is the member-elect of the Kansas House of Representatives for the 39th district. A member of the Democratic Party, he was elected in November 2026.

== Early life and education ==
Maier was raised on a farm. He graduated from Kansas State University in 2009 with a bachelor's degree in computer engineering.

== Career ==
Before entering politics, Maier worked in product management at Google, Foursquare, and Meta. His work at Google included Google Maps. He operates ZPM LLC, a consulting company.

In 2017, Maier received the Professional Progress Award from Kansas State University's College of Engineering. He served on the K-State Alumni Association's board of directors from 2019 to 2024.

== Political career ==
Maier first ran for the Kansas House of Representatives in 2026, seeking the 39th district seat. The district includes parts of Shawnee and Lake Quivira. When he filed, he identified increased state funding for K–12 public education as a priority. He was unopposed in the Democratic primary. His campaign was endorsed by LGBTQ+ Victory Fund.

Maier defeated the Republican incumbent in the November 3 general election. He received 54% of the vote. His victory was among Democratic gains in Johnson County in an election that ended the Republican supermajority in the Kansas House.

His term is scheduled to begin on January 11, 2027.

== Personal life ==
Maier lives in Lake Quivira, Kansas, with his husband and their two daughters.

== Electoral history ==
2026 Kansas House District 39 general election — unofficial results reported November 4, 2026
Candidate	Party	Votes	%
Zach Maier	Democratic	6,206	54
Angela Stiens	Republican	5,255	46
