= Amanda Wiederaenders =

American politician

Member-elect of the Kansas House of Representatives from the 30th district
- Assuming office January 2027
- Succeeding: Laura Williams

Personal details
- Party: Democratic

Amanda Wiederaenders is an American politician. A member of the Democratic Party, she is the member-elect for the 30th district of the Kansas House of Representatives.
