= Allen Reavis =

American politician

Member of the Kansas House of Representatives from the 63rd district
- Incumbent
- Assumed office January 13, 2025
- Preceded by: John Eplee

Personal details
- Party: Republican
- Education: University of Missouri–Kansas City
- Profession: Dentist
- Website: allenreavis.com

Allen Reavis is an American politician from Kansas that currently represents the 63rd district of the Kansas House of Representatives since 2024 as a Republican.

== Biography ==
Reavis is a University of Missouri–Kansas City educated dentist having spent a lengthy career within the profession, serving on the Kansas Dental Association and the American Dental Association.He is currently serving as a Trustee on the ADA national Board of Trustees. The District he represents includes Kansas, Oklahoma, Arkansas and Louisiana. A resident of Atchison, Kansas, he also helped with the creation of a federally qualified health center dental clinic within the city. Prior to his election to the Kansas House of Representatives, he had served on the Atchison County commission. He also served 13 years on the Atchison City Commission, five years as mayor of Atchison.

Reavis was unopposed in both the Republican Primary and the General Election.
