= Greg Wilson (politician) =

American politician

Member of the Kansas House of Representatives from the 70th district
- Incumbent
- Assumed office August 1, 2025
- Preceded by: Scott Hill

Personal details
- Party: Republican
- Spouse: Marcia Wilson
- Education: Kansas State University
- Profession: Farmer
- Website: House Website

Greg Wilson is an American politician serving as a Republican member of the Kansas House of Representatives following the latter being named to the Kansas Senate.

== Biography ==
Incumbent representative Scott Hill resigned from the heavily Republican 70th legislative district on June 26, 2025, to fill a vacancy in the Kansas Senate, opening a competition among local Republicans as to who would replace him. The two leading candidates were Wilson and Brandon Rein, the chair of the Dickinson County Republican Party and the incumbent mayor of Abilene. Rein saw an endorsement from Dickinson County Commissioner Kenny Roelofsen and Bret Nagely, a committeeman of Garfield Township while Wilson was endorsed by Kevin Harris, a committeeman of Jefferson Township, and Kent Rock, a committeeman of Ridge Township.

Due to the strong presence of the Republican Party in the district, no formal election was called, instead a precinct committee was formed to name a successor, with 79 voters. 6 would abstain or otherwise not be present at the vote, but of the remainder, 30 voted for Rein and 43 voted for Wilson. Wilson was sworn in on August 1, 2025, by judge Ben Sexton, with the two being in the same fraternity together while at Kansas State University. One of his first acts as a legislator was to sign a pledge to term limit himself, and to advocate for term limit legislation in Kansas, and the broader United States.

== Personal life ==
Wilson's wife, Marcia, is the chairwoman of the Dickinson County Republican Women, and the couple have two daughters; Hannah Uhart and Hillary Kersten.
