= Sean Willcott =

American politician

Member of the Kansas House of Representatives from the 62nd district
- Incumbent
- Assumed office January 13, 2025
- Preceded by: Randy Garber

Personal details
- Party: Republican
- Profession: Business owner
- Website: kslegislature.gov

Sean Willcott is an American politician from Kansas that currently represents the 62nd district of the Kansas House of Representatives since 2024 as a Republican.

== Biography ==
Willcott would stand for the Republican primary for the 62nd district of the Kansas House of Representatives. The election was highly competitive with four candidates. Willcott would be endorsed by Americans for Prosperity, an advocacy group established by the Koch Brothers. Willcott would narrowly win the nomination with 39.48% of the vote ahead of the second place Dylan Keim of Seneca with 36.23% of the vote. Since there was no Democratic candidate, Willcott would win his election unopposed.
