= Alexis Simmons =

American politician

Member of the Kansas House of Representatives from the 58th district
- Incumbent
- Assumed office January 13, 2025
- Preceded by: Vic Miller

Personal details
- Party: Democratic
- Education: Washburn University; American University
- Profession: Educator
- Website: simmonsforkansas.org

Alexis Simmons is an American politician from Kansas that currently represents the 58th district of the Kansas House of Representatives since 2024 as a Democrat.

== Biography ==
Simmons is a graduate from Washburn University where she was student president, before earning a master's degree in politics and government from American University. Out of college Simmons joined a DEI consultancy where she worked to get more women elected to public office and worked as communication director for Tom Sawyer in 2021. She then worked as the Kansas House Democrats Communications Director from 2021-2025 before assuming office. She has been an adjunct professor at Washburn University since 2022, teaching American government.

=== Kansas representative ===
In 2024 Simmons would run to replace incumbent Democrat Vic Miller who ran for Kansas Senate. She would face a primary opponent in Wendy Damman-Bednar, which she would defeat with 85.22% of the vote to face off against Republican Michael Mathewson who she defeated with 63.54% of the vote. She campaigned on building more affordable housing, increasing funding for public schools, and "defending women’s health."
