= Tory Marie Blew =

American politician (born 1993)

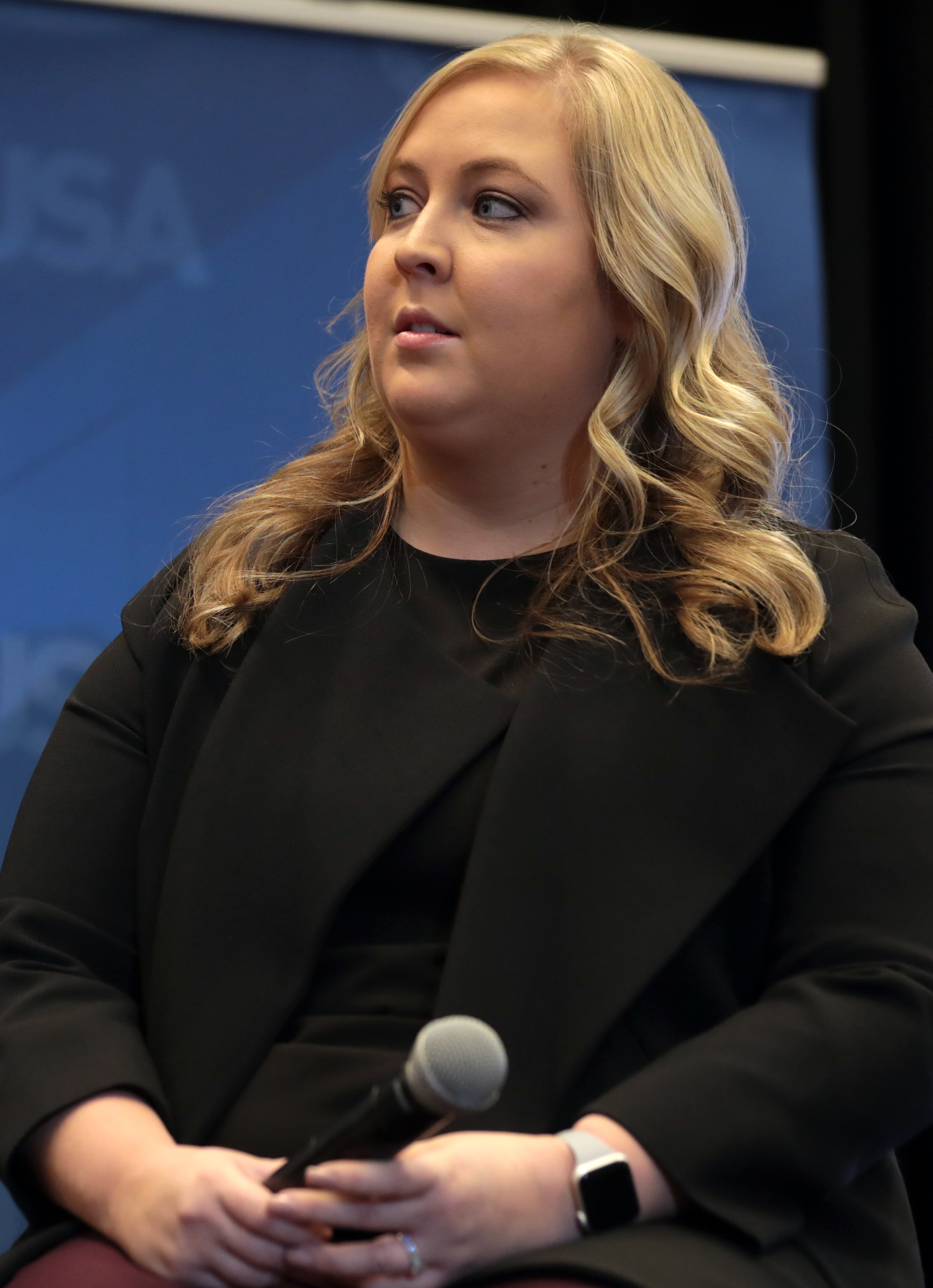

Member of the Kansas Senate from the 33rd district
- Incumbent
- Assumed office January 13, 2025
- Preceded by: Alicia Straub

Member of the Kansas House of Representatives from the 112th district
- In office January 9, 2017 – January 13, 2025
- Preceded by: John Edmonds
- Succeeded by: Sherri Brantley

Personal details
- Born: Tory Marie Arnberger; May 3, 1993 (age 33) Great Bend, Kansas, U.S.
- Party: Republican
- Spouse: Justin Blew (m. 2020)
- Education: Fort Hays State University

Tory Marie Blew (née Arnberger; born May 3, 1993) is an American politician from the state of Kansas. She served as a Republican member of the Kansas House of Representatives from 2017 to 2025, representing the 112th district in Barton County, Kansas.

She announced her candidacy while a senior at Fort Hays State University, and was the youngest member of the Kansas Legislature from 2017 to 2021. In 2022, she was elected as the House Majority Whip. She also was the chair of Kansas Young Republicans in 2021-2022 and currently serves as their National Committeewoman. In 2024, she was elected to the state senate.

== Personal life ==
Blew is from Great Bend, Kansas. She graduated from Fort Hays State University with a degree in business education and subsequently worked as a teacher in a rural school district. She continues to work for her family business as the Human Resources Director of Pryor Automatic Fire Sprinkler.

Arnberger married her husband, Justin Blew, on September 26, 2020.

== Kansas House of Representatives (2017–present) ==
=== Committee assignments ===
2021–2022

- Federal and State Affairs (Vice Chairman)
- Health and Human Services
- General Government Budget
- 2021 Special Committee on Mental Health Modernization and Reform
- 2021 Special Committee on Child Support Enforcement and Collection

2019–2020

- General Government Budget (Vice Chairman)
- Federal and State Affairs
- Health and Human Services
- 2020 Special Committee on Mental Health Modernization and Reform

2017–2018

- Federal and State Affairs
- Education
- Agriculture and Natural Resources Budget
