= Brooklynne Mosley =

American politician

Member of the Kansas House of Representatives from the 46th district
- Incumbent
- Assumed office January 13, 2025
- Preceded by: Dennis Highberger

Personal details
- Party: Democratic
- Profession: Community organizer
- Website: brooklynnemosley.com

Brooklynne Mosley is an American politician from Kansas that currently represents the 46th district of the Kansas House of Representatives since 2024 as a Democrat.

== Biography ==
Mosley was born in Kansas City, Missouri, but would be raised in Waldo, Kansas, until she was nine when her father's work made her family move to Queens and later South Suburban Chicago. Mosley joined the United States Air Force and was deployed during Operation Iraqi Freedom and Operation Enduring Freedom. She separated in 2013 and moved to Lawrence, Kansas, to attend The University of Kansas. Since moving to Kansas, Mosley has worked as a community organizer.

=== Kansas House of Representatives ===
Mosley ran for the Kansas House of Representatives in the 46th district in 2024 with a platform calling for extending property tax relief programs, addressing food insecurity and the threat of climate change; and expanding voting rights. Mosley and Democrats Brittany Kathleen Hall and Logan Ginavan vied for the Democratic nomination. Hall campaigned on increasing immigrant and American Indian rights while Ginavan was a 21 year old part time master Lego builder at Legoland. Mosley won with 67.01% of the vote. She was unopposed in the general election.
