= Megan Steele =

American politician

Member of the Kansas House of Representatives from the 51st district
- Incumbent
- Assumed office January 13, 2025
- Preceded by: Kenny Titus

Personal details
- Party: Republican
- Profession: Nurse
- Website: Kansas Legislature Website

Megan Steele is an American politician from Kansas that currently represents the 51st district of the Kansas House of Representatives since 2024 as a Republican.

== Biography ==
Prior to her election, Steele worked as a PhD level nurse. During high school Steele had a baby, which shaped her opposition to abortion and support for increased community support for young mothers.

Steele ran for the Kansas House of Representatives seeking to succeed Kenny Titus who ran for the Kansas Senate. She narrowly won the Republican primary with 1,572 to her challenger, Eli Kormanik's, 1,550. Steele defeated Democratic former mayor of Manhattan, Linda Morse, with 7,903 votes to Morse's 3,602. In 2026, Steele spoke in support of a Kansas House bill which would outlaw the teaching of "DEI," (Diversity, Equity and Inclusion) and "CRT," (Critical Race Theory) in Kansas universities.
