= Bradley Ralph =

American attorney and politician

Member of the Kansas House of Representatives from the 119th district
- In office January 9, 2017 – January 9, 2023
- Preceded by: Bud Estes
- Succeeded by: Jason Goetz

Personal details
- Born: December 31, 1969 (age 56)
- Party: Republican
- Spouse: Shannon
- Children: 3
- Education: St. Mary of the Plains College (BA); Washburn University (JD)

Bradley Ralph (born December 31, 1969) is an American attorney and politician who served as a member of the Kansas House of Representatives from the 119th district from 2017 to 2023.

== Education ==
Ralph earned a Bachelor of Arts degree in history from St. Mary of the Plains College in 1981 and a Juris Doctor from the Washburn University School of Law in 1984.

== Career ==
From 1984 to 2014, Ralph was an attorney and partner at Williams Malone & Ralph in Dodge City, Kansas. In 2014, he was elected the city and prosecuting attorney of Dodge City. In the November 2016 general election for district 119 in the Kansas House of Representatives, Ralph defeated Democratic nominee Daniel L. Love.
