= John Barker (Kansas politician) =

American politician

Member of the Kansas House of Representatives from the 70th district
- In office January 14, 2013 – January 9, 2023
- Preceded by: J. Robert Brookens
- Succeeded by: Scott Hill

Personal details
- Born: April 16, 1951 (age 75)
- Party: Republican
- Spouse: April
- Children: 2
- Profession: Judge, lawyer, farmer
- Website: www.Barker4Kansas.com

John E. Barker (born April 16, 1951) is an American politician. He served as a Republican member of the Kansas House of Representatives, representing the 70th district, and served as the chairman of the House Committee on Federal and State Affairs. He was initially elected to the Kansas House of Representatives in 2012, and lost the Republican primary for r-election in 2022.

Barker served as a judge for the Kansas Eighth Judicial District for 25 years.
