= Dale Helwig =

American politician

Member of the Kansas House of Representatives from the 1st district
- Incumbent
- Assumed office January 13, 2025
- Preceded by: Michael Houser

Personal details
- Party: Republican
- Profession: Rancher, contractor
- Website: dalehelwigforkansas.com

Dale Helwig is an American politician from Kansas that currently represents the first district of the Kansas House of Representatives since 2024 as a Republican.

== Biography ==
Helwig was born in Columbus, Kansas, and graduated from Riverton High School and Kansas State University. A farmer, Helwig also worked in the construction business and was the Cherokee County Agricultural Agent for Kansas State University for 10 years prior to his election.

=== State representative ===
Helwig was elected to the Kansas House of Representatives in 2024.
