= Lon Pishny =

American politician

Member of the Kansas House of Representatives from the 122nd district
- Incumbent
- Assumed office January 13, 2025
- Preceded by: Bill Clifford

Personal details
- Party: Republican
- Education: Fort Hays State University
- Profession: Financial Counselor
- Website: lonpishny.com

Lon Pishny is an American politician from Kansas who currently represents the 122nd district of the Kansas House of Representatives. He is as a Republican.

== Biography ==
Lon Pishny was born and raised on a farm in Marshall County. He graduated from the Valley Heights High School in Waterville, Kansas in 1967 and earned a B.S. at Fort Hays State University (FHSU) in 1971, and an M.S. at FHSU in 1978. Pishny attended the College for Financial Planning earning his Certified Financial Planner status there in 1988 before attending the Graduate School of Banking at the University of Wisconsin - Madison graduating in 1991. Afterwards he worked as a financial counselor for various insurance agencies. Prior to his election to the state house Pishny was a member of the Finney County Board of Commissioners and had served on the board of the FHSU Foundation, the Kansas Public Employee Retirement System's, as a member of the State Broadband Task Force, the Kansas Supreme Court Nominating Commission, and the Workforce Investment Board.

=== State representative ===
Pishny describes himself as "committed to Biblical principles." Pishny stated that life begins at conception, but also called for an increased welfare system to support the disabled and elderly.

Pishny was unopposed in both the primaries and the general election.

== Personal life ==
Lon is married to Janyth Pishny, the couple have two children. Lon is a grandfather with five granddaughters, and a grandson.
