= Kevin Schwertfeger =

American politician

Member of the Kansas House of Representatives from the 114th district
- Incumbent
- Assumed office January 13, 2025
- Preceded by: Michael Murphy

Personal details
- Born: Stafford, KS
- Party: Republican
- Education: Hutchinson Community College; Kansas State University
- Profession: Crop Consultant /Cattleman
- Website: ksforkansas.com

Kevin Schwertfeger is a Conservative Republican American politician from Kansas that currently represents the 114th district of the Kansas House of Representatives since 2024 as a Republican.

== Early life ==
Schwertfeger grew up on his parents farm. Ron & Sharon 4th Generation Kansas Farmers & Cattleman. They worked and sacrificed that Kevin and his brother Jeff would be raised in a home where Christ was the center focus of life. Raised in a SC Kansas community with friends and caring neighbors exhibiting hard working Kansas values. Kevin attended Turon Grade School and Fairfield High School in Langdon, Kansas, Hutchinson Community College earning an Associate of Arts in agriculture. Later attendedKansas State University and earned a Bachelor of Science in crop protection. For 23 years Schwertfeger worked as a volunteer firefighter and serves as a 25 yr trustee of Miami township as well as a term on the Fairfield USD 310 school board.
