= Sherri Brantley =

American politician

Member of the Kansas House of Representatives from the 112th district
- Incumbent
- Assumed office January 13, 2025
- Preceded by: Tory Marie Blew

Personal details
- Party: Republican
- Profession: Math specialist
- Website: House Website

Sherri Brantley is an American politician from Kansas who currently represents the 112th district of the Kansas House of Representatives. She is a Republican.

== Biography ==
Brantley graduated from Great Bend High School in 1984 and graduated from the University of Central Oklahoma in 1989 with a degree in elementary education. She earned a Master of Science degree in Elementary Education/English Speakers of Other Languages in 2004 and a Master of Science in Building Administration in 2008 from Fort Hays State University (SHSU). In 2014 she earned an Educational Doctorate in Educational Leadership from Walden University. Brantley had a 32-year career as a math teacher across Oklahoma and Kansas including working as a professor at SHSU before becoming a Math specialist for Kansas MTSS and Alignment.

=== State representative ===
Brantley sought to replace outgoing State Representative Tory Marie Blew in 2024, running unopposed in the Republican primary. Her prior political experience was limited to being the Precinct Committeewoman for the Eureka Township.
