= Boog Highberger =

American politician

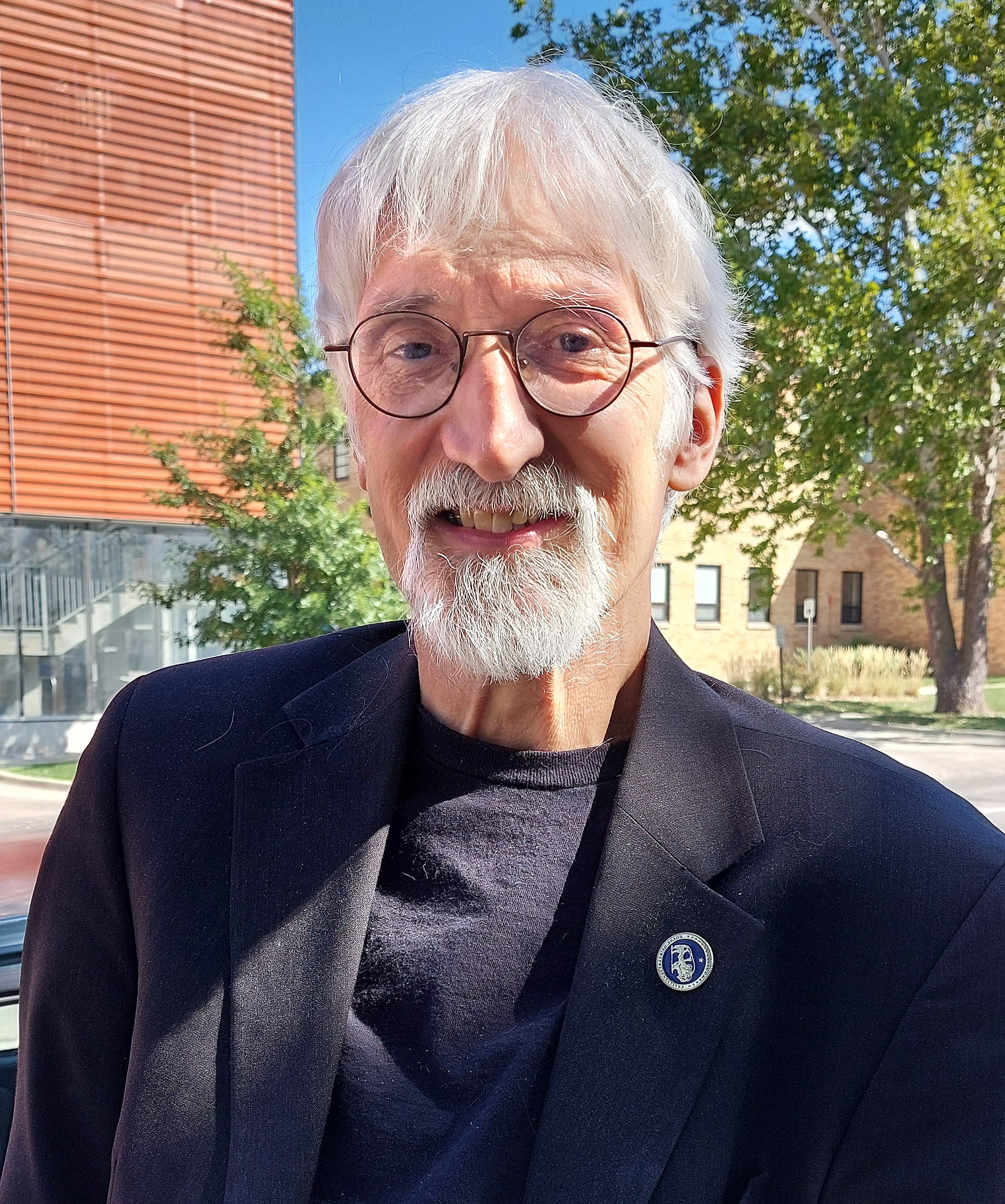

Member of the Kansas House of Representatives from the 46th district
- In office January 12, 2015 – January 13, 2025
- Preceded by: Paul Davis
- Succeeded by: Brooklynne Mosley

Personal details
- Born: Dennis Highberger; September 26, 1959 (age 67) Garnett, Kansas, U.S.
- Party: Democratic
- Education: University of Kansas JD 1992
- Profession: attorney

Dennis "Boog" Highberger (born September 26, 1959) is an American politician. He served as a City Council member in Lawrence, Kansas from 2003 through 2009 and was the city's mayor from 2005 through 2006. He graduated from the University of Kansas School of Law in 1992. He was an attorney with the Kansas Department of Health and Environment (KDHE) from 1992 to 2011. He served as a Democratic member of the Kansas House of Representatives for the 46th district from 2015 to 2025.
