= Michael Houser (politician) =

American politician

Member of the Kansas House of Representatives from the 1st district
- In office January 14, 2013 – January 13, 2025
- Preceded by: Doug Gatewood
- Succeeded by: Dale Helwig

Personal details
- Party: Republican
- Profession: Construction estimator
- Website: www.houser4house.com

Michael Houser is an American politician who served as a Republican member of the Kansas House of Representatives, representing the 1st district (Columbus, Kansas in Cherokee County, Kansas). He served from 2013 until after the 2024 elections, when he did not seek re-election. He lost the 2010 election after calling for a recount. He was given a lifetime evaluation of 88% by the American Conservative Union.
