= Angela Martinez (politician) =

American politician

Member of the Kansas House of Representatives from the 103rd district
- Incumbent
- Assumed office January 9, 2023
- Preceded by: Ponka-We Victors

Personal details
- Party: Democratic

Angela Martinez is a Democratic member of the Kansas House of Representatives, representing the 103rd district.
