= Stephanie Clayton =

American politician (born 1977)

Member of the Kansas House of Representatives from the 19th district
- Incumbent
- Assumed office January 14, 2013
- Preceded by: Jim Denning

Personal details
- Born: July 9, 1977 (age 49)
- Party: Democratic (since 2018)
- Other political affiliations: Republican (until December 2018)
- Education: Emporia State University (BS)

Stephanie Clayton (born July 9, 1977) is an American politician who has served as a Democratic member of the Kansas House of Representatives from the 19th district (Overland Park in Johnson County) since 2013. She was elected as a Republican, but after winning reelection on November 6, 2018, with 58.9% of the vote, she announced she was changing her party affiliation on December 19, 2018.

On November 15, 2019, she announced her candidacy for the 7th district seat in the Kansas Senate. On January 21, 2020, she announced that she was ending her campaign for the Kansas Senate and would seek reelection to a fifth term in the Kansas House of Representatives.

On March 10, 2020, she was appointed as ranking minority member of the House Education Committee. Clayton assumed the posts of minority whip and ranking minority member of the Commerce, Labor and Economic Development Committee in January 2021. She retained her House seat, running unopposed and winning on November 3, 2020, with 12,369 votes.

On November 8, 2022, she was reelected to her House seat, with 58.9% of the vote.

== Kansas House of Representatives ==
2023–2024 Committees

- Commerce, Labor and Economic Development
- Federal and State Affairs
- Taxation
- Unemployment Compensation Modernization and Improvement Council
- Rules

2021–2022 Committees

- Ranking Minority Member of Commerce, Labor and Economic Development
- Federal and State Affairs
- Taxation
- Redistricting
- Rules and Journal

2019–2020 Committees

- Ranking Minority Member of Education (March 10, 2020 – January 11, 2021)
- Federal and State Affairs
- Member of Education (January 15, 2019 - March 10, 2020)
- Taxation
- 2019 Special Committee on Federal and State Affairs

2017–2018 Committees

- Vice Chairman of Social Services Budget
- Federal and State Affairs
- Commerce, Labor and Economic Development

2015–2016 Committees

- Federal and State Affairs
- Agriculture and Natural Resources Budget
- Social Services Budget

2013–2014 Committees

- Utilities and Telecommunications
- Transportation and Public Safety Budget
- Local Government

== Memberships ==
- Bipartisan Women’s Caucus (founding member)
- Johnson County Commission on Aging (since 2013)
- National Council of State Legislators Women’s Legislative Network (President)
- Women in Government (State Director)
- National Council of State Legislatures (Budget and Revenue Committee)
- Council of State Government (Education and Workforce Development Committee)

== Education ==
Clayton graduated from the Shawnee Mission School District and Emporia State University, earning a Bachelor's degree in History.

Kansas House of Representatives
Preceded by Jim Gartner	Minority Whip of the Kansas House of Representatives; January 11, 2021 - Present	Succeeded by Incumbent
Preceded by Stan Frownfelter	Kansas House of Representatives Ranking Minority Member of the Commerce, Labor and Economic Development Committee; January 11, 2021 - Present	Succeeded by Incumbent
Preceded by Jim Ward	Kansas House of Representatives Ranking Minority Member of the Education Committee; March 10, 2020 - January 11, 2021	Succeeded by Jerry Stogsdill
Preceded by Peggy Mast	Kansas House of Representatives Vice Chairman of the Social Services Budget Committee; January 10, 2017 - January 15, 2019	Succeeded by Leonard Mastroni
