= Boyd Orr (politician) =

American politician

Member of the Kansas House of Representatives from the 115th district
- In office January 9, 2017 – January 9, 2023
- Preceded by: Ron Ryckman Sr.
- Succeeded by: Gary White

Personal details
- Born: November 29, 1945 (age 80)
- Party: Republican
- Spouse: Sandie
- Profession: farmer/rancher

Boyd Orr (born November 29, 1945) is an American politician. He served as a Republican member for the 115th district in the Kansas House of Representatives from 2017 to 2023.
