= Vic Miller =

American politician

Minority Leader of the Kansas House of Representatives
- In office January 9, 2023 – January 10, 2025
- Preceded by: Tom Sawyer
- Succeeded by: Brandon Woodard

Member of the Kansas House of Representatives from the 53rd district
- In office January 8, 1979 – January 14, 1985
- Preceded by: Jim Slattery
- Succeeded by: Bill Roy Jr.

Member of the Kansas House of Representatives from the 58th district
- In office January 9, 2017 – January 14, 2019
- Preceded by: Ben Scott
- Succeeded by: Freda Warfield
- In office January 11, 2021 – January 13, 2025
- Preceded by: Freda Warfield
- Succeeded by: Alexis Simmons

Member of the Kansas Senate from the 18th district
- In office January 14, 2019 – January 11, 2021
- Preceded by: Laura Kelly
- Succeeded by: Kristen O'Shea

Personal details
- Born: October 19, 1951 (age 74) Topeka, Kansas, U.S.
- Party: Democratic

Victor W. Miller (born October 19, 1951) is an American politician from the state of Kansas. He served as a member of the Kansas House of Representatives, including as minority leader from 2023 to 2025, and of the Kansas Senate.

== Political career ==
Miller was originally elected to the Kansas House in 1978 from the 53rd House district, serving from 1979 to 1984. In 1984, he ran for the Kansas State Senate in the 18th Senate district, but was defeated by Republican Jeanne Hoferer. After leaving the House in 1984, he served as a County Commissioner in Shawnee County, Kansas, then as a Topeka Municipal Court Judge.

In 2016, he re-entered the legislature, winning election to the 58th House district. He served one term there before being appointed to the 18th Senate district in January 2019, after the seat was left vacant when Laura Kelly resigned to serve as Governor of Kansas. Miller finished out the remaining two years of Kelly's term, and then returned to his House seat, successfully running for the House in 2020. During his tenure in the Kansas Senate, he served as Ranking Minority Member of the Senate Judiciary Committee. In 2024, he ran for the 19th Senate district, but he lost in the Democratic primary.

== Personal life ==
On May 7, 2019, he was arrested on suspicion of drunk driving when he drove his car into a Topeka ditch. He was charged with DUI on November 25, 2019 by a special prosecutor assigned the case to avoid conflicts of interest. Miller agreed to enter a diversion program to resolve the charge on July 14, 2020.

Kansas House of Representatives
Preceded by Tom Sawyer	Minority Leader of the Kansas House of Representatives; 2023–2025	Succeeded by Brandon Woodard
