= Angela Stiens =

American politician

Member of the Kansas House of Representatives from the 39th district
- Incumbent
- Assumed office March 14, 2024
- Preceded by: Owen Donohoe

Personal details
- Party: Republican
- Website: kslegislature.gov

Angela Stiens is an American politician from Kansas who represents the 39th district of the Kansas House of Representatives since 2024 as a Republican.

== Biography ==
In 2021 Stiens was elected to the Shawnee City Council. In 2024 she was tapped by the Johnson County Republican party to succeed incumbent Owen Donohoe who had announced his retirement. In the general election later that year she defeated Democratic challenger Vanessa Vaughn West 51.58% to 48.42%.
