= John Eplee =

American politician

Member of the Kansas House of Representatives from the 63rd district
- In office January 9, 2017 – January 13, 2025
- Preceded by: Jerry Henry
- Succeeded by: Allen Reavis

Personal details
- Born: March 24, 1953 (age 73) Fredonia, Kansas, U.S.
- Party: Republican
- Spouse: Deborah
- Children: 3
- Education: Kansas State University, University of Kansas School of Medicine
- Profession: physician

John Eplee (born March 24, 1953) is an American politician. He served as a Republican member of the Kansas House of Representatives, representing the 63rd district from 2017 to 2025. He lost the Republican primary for a seat in the Kansas Senate in 2024.
