= Ken Collins (Kansas politician) =

American politician

Member of the Kansas House of Representatives from the 2nd district
- Incumbent
- Assumed office January 14, 2019
- Preceded by: Adam Lusker

Personal details
- Born: January 27, 1963 (age 63) Pittsburg, Kansas, U.S.
- Party: Republican
- Education: Fort Scott Community College (AS); Friends University (BS)
- Website: kenforkansas.net

Kenneth Collins (born January 27, 1963) is an American politician in the state of Kansas. He has served as a Republican in the Kansas House of Representatives for the 2nd district since 2019.

He attended Fort Scott Community College where he earned an Associates of Science and attended Friends University from 1999 to 2001 where he earned a Bachelors of Science in Computer Information Systems.
