= Virgil Weigel =

American politician from Kansas (born 1953)

Member of the Kansas House of Representatives from the 56th district
- Incumbent
- Assumed office January 14, 2013
- Preceded by: Annie Tietze

Personal details
- Born: February 25, 1953 (age 73)
- Party: Democratic
- Spouse: Jeanette

Virgil Weigel (born February 25, 1953) is an American politician, a Democratic member of the Kansas House of Representatives. He represents the 56th district, Topeka, Kansas in Shawnee County, Kansas.
