= Lance Neelly =

American politician

Member of the Kansas House of Representatives from the 42nd district
- Incumbent
- Assumed office January 11, 2021
- Preceded by: Jim Karleskint

Personal details
- Party: Republican

Lance Neelly is an American politician. He served as a Republican member for the 42nd district of the Kansas House of Representatives.

In 2021, Neelly won the election for the 42nd district of the Kansas House of Representatives. He succeeded Jim Karleskint. Neelly assumed his office on January 11, 2021.
