= Brian Bergkamp =

American accountant and politician

Member of the Kansas House of Representatives from the 93rd district
- Incumbent
- Assumed office January 11, 2021
- Preceded by: J.C. Moore

Personal details
- Party: Republican
- Education: Friends University (BS)

Brian Bergkamp is an American accountant and politician, serving as a member of the Kansas House of Representatives from the 93rd district. Elected in November 2020, he assumed office on January 11, 2021.

== Education ==
Bergkamp graduated from Pretty Prairie High School in Pretty Prairie, Kansas, and earned a Bachelor of Science in Accounting from Friends University.

== Career ==
After graduating from college in 2008, Bergkamp joined Koch Supply & Trading, a subsidiary of Koch Industries, as a tax analyst. He later worked as a trade accounting analyst and a logistics analyst for Koch Ag & Energy Solutions before working as a marketing supervisor and project manager for Koch Fertilizer. Bergkamp was elected to the Kansas House of Representatives in November 2020 and assumed office on January 11, 2021.
