= Jo Ella Hoye =

American politician

Member of the Kansas House of Representatives from the 17th district
- Incumbent
- Assumed office January 11, 2021
- Preceded by: Tom Cox

Personal details
- Born: Lincoln, Nebraska, U.S.
- Party: Democratic
- Spouse: Brian
- Education: Cornell College (BA); University of Kansas (MPA)

Jo Ella Hoye is an American politician serving as a member of the Kansas House of Representatives from the 17th district. Elected in November 2020, she assumed office on January 11, 2021.

== Early life and education ==
Hoye was born in Lincoln, Nebraska, and graduated from Nebraska City High School. She earned a Bachelor of Arts degree from Cornell College in Mount Vernon, Iowa, and a Master of Public Administration from the University of Kansas.

== Career ==
Hoye worked as a senior analyst for the Johnson County manager's office. She also served as a member and vice chair of the Lenexa Planning Commission Advisory Board. She was elected to the Kansas House of Representatives in November 2020 and assumed office on January 11, 2021. Hoye was also a representative for the Kansas chapter of Moms Demand Action, a gun control group. In the House, she advocated for stricter gun control regulations, including an amendment that would repeal permitless concealed carry in Kansas.
