= Sean Tarwater =

American politician

Member of the Kansas House of Representatives from the 27th district
- Incumbent
- Assumed office January 9, 2017
- Preceded by: Raymond Merrick

Personal details
- Born: February 25, 1969 (age 57) Kansas City, Kansas, U.S.
- Party: Republican
- Spouse: Lexie
- Children: 4
- Education: University of Missouri-Kansas City
- Website: www.TeamTarwater.com

Sean E. Tarwater, Sr. (born February 25, 1969) is an American politician who has served as a Republican member of the Kansas House of Representatives from the 27th district since 2017.

== Political career ==
Tarwater was first elected to represent District 27 in the Kansas House of Representatives in 2016. He was re-elected in 2018 and 2020.

=== Electoral history ===
2016 Republican primary: Kansas House of Representatives, District 27
Party	Candidate	Votes	%
Republican	Sean Tarwater	1,539	53.53%
Republican	Timothy Harmon	1,336	46.47%

2016 general election: Kansas House of Representatives, District 27
Party	Candidate	Votes	%
Republican	Sean Tarwater	9,712	69.34%
Democratic	Larry Miller	4,294	30.66%

2018 Republican primary: Kansas House of Representatives, District 27
Party	Candidate	Votes	%
Republican	Sean Tarwater	1,916	45.4%
Republican	Rochelle Bird	1,268	30.0%
Republican	Karen Snyder	1,040	24.6%

2018 general election: Kansas House of Representatives, District 27
Party	Candidate	Votes	%
Republican	Sean Tarwater	8,420	60.6%
Democratic	Nicole Rome	5,476	39.4%
