= Shannon Francis =

American politician (born 1959)

Member of the Kansas House of Representatives from the 125th district
- Incumbent
- Assumed office January 12, 2015
- Preceded by: Reid Petty

Personal details
- Born: April 19, 1959 (age 67) Meade, Kansas, U.S.
- Party: Republican
- Spouse: Carol
- Children: 3
- Education: Kansas State University; Seward County Community College

Shannon Francis (born April 19, 1959) is an American politician who has served in the Kansas House of Representatives from the 125th district since 2015.

Kansas House of Representatives
| Preceded by Richard Proehl | Kansas House of Representatives Chairman of the Transportation Committee; January 15, 2023–present | Succeeded by Incumbent |
