= Kyle Hoffman =

American politician (born 1971)

Kyle D. Hoffman

Member of the Kansas House of Representatives from the 116th district
- Incumbent
- Assumed office January 10, 2011
- Preceded by: Patrick Maloney

Personal details
- Born: June 11, 1971 (age 55) Greensburg, Kansas, U.S.
- Party: Republican
- Spouse: Kristi Hoffman
- Children: 2
- Education: Kansas State University
- Website: www.KyleHoffman.net

Kyle D. Hoffman (born June 11, 1971) is an American politician who represents the 116th District in the Kansas House of Representatives, and serves as the Chairman of the House Agriculture Committee. He was first elected in 2010.

Hoffman previously served as the Chairman of the House Agriculture & Natural Resources Budget Committee from January 2015 until January 2017. He also is the former Majority Caucus Chairman in the Kansas House.
