= Doug Blex =

American politician

Member of the Kansas House of Representatives from the 12th district
- Incumbent
- Assumed office January 9, 2017
- Preceded by: Virgil Peck Jr.

Personal details
- Born: December 19, 1946 (age 79) Montgomery County, Kansas, U.S.
- Party: Republican
- Spouse: Meggin
- Children: 5
- Education: Kansas State University
- Profession: farmer, retired wildlife biologist

Charles Douglas Blex (born December 19, 1946) is an American politician. He has served as a Republican member for the 12th district in the Kansas House of Representatives since 2017.
