= Pam Curtis =

American politician

Member of the Kansas House of Representatives from the 32nd district
- Incumbent
- Assumed office March 8, 2014
- Preceded by: Michael Peterson

Personal details
- Born: May 4, 1955 (age 71) Kansas City, Kansas, U.S.
- Party: Democratic
- Spouse: Steven
- Profession: Elected Official & Chief of Staff

Pam Curtis (née Horton; born May 4, 1955) is an American politician. She has served as a Democratic member for the 32nd district in the Kansas House of Representatives since 2014. She was appointed to this position after the death of the incumbent, and won re-election in November 2020 with 75% of the vote.
