= Joe Seiwert =

American politician

Member of the Kansas House of Representatives from the 101st district
- Incumbent
- Assumed office January 12, 2009
- Preceded by: Mark Treaster

Personal details
- Born: August 21, 1951 (age 74) Pretty Prairie, Kansas, U.S.
- Party: Republican
- Spouse: Linda
- Children: 3
- Education: University of Nebraska–Lincoln; Friends University

Joe Seiwert (born August 21, 1951) is a Republican member of the Kansas House of Representatives, representing the 101st district. He has served since 2009. In 2017, the American Conservative Union gave him a lifetime evaluation of 77%. In 2022, during a public forum, Seiwert promulgated the litter boxes in schools hoax.
