= John Alcala =

American politician

Member of the Kansas House of Representatives from the 57th district
- Incumbent
- Assumed office January 14, 2013
- Preceded by: Sean Gatewood

Personal details
- Born: May 23, 1959 (age 67)
- Party: Democratic
- Education: Washburn University

John Alcala (May 23, 1959) is an American politician currently serving as a Democratic member of the Kansas House of Representatives, representing the 57th district (Topeka, Kansas in Shawnee County, Kansas). He is a graduate of both Topeka High School and Washburn University. For 14 years he was a member of the Topeka City Council after which he became city's Deputy Mayor.
