= Paul Waggoner (politician) =

American politician

Member of the Kansas House of Representatives from the 104th district
- Incumbent
- Assumed office January 14, 2019
- Preceded by: Steven Becker

Personal details
- Party: Republican
- Spouse: Debra
- Children: 3
- Education: University of Kansas (BA); Trinity International University (MA)

Paul Waggoner is an American politician and businessman serving as a member of the Kansas House of Representatives from the 104th district. Elected in 2018, he assumed office in 2019.

== Education ==
Waggoner earned a Bachelor of Science in business from the University of Kansas and a Master of Arts in history from Trinity International University.

== Career ==
Prior to entering politics, Waggoner owned and managed Waggoners, Inc., a cushioning and upholstery business based in Hutchinson, Kansas. Waggoner also served as a precinct committeeman of Medora Township, Reno County, Kansas. In the 2018 Republican primary for the 104th district in the Kansas House of Representatives Waggoner defeated incumbent Steven Becker by nine points. He then defeated Democratic nominee Garth Strand in the November general election. Waggoner defeated Strand again in the 2020 November general election.
