= Timothy H. Johnson =

American politician

Timothy Johnson

Member of the Kansas House of Representatives from the 38th district
- Incumbent
- Assumed office January 11, 2021
- Preceded by: Willie Dove

Personal details
- Party: Republican
- Education: Bethany College (BA); Wichita State University (MS); Pittsburg State University (MEd)

Timothy H. Johnson is an American politician serving as a member of the Kansas House of Representatives from the 38th district. Elected in November 2020, he assumed office on January 11, 2021.

== Education ==
Johnson earned a Bachelor of Arts degree in education from Bethany College, a Master of Science in administration of justice from Wichita State University, and a Master of Education from Pittsburg State University.

== Career ==
Johnson worked as a teacher at Basehor-Linwood High School and Wyandotte High School. He also served as a special investigator for the state of Kansas and as director of public safety for Lindsborg, Kansas. Johnson was elected to the Kansas House of Representatives in November 2020 and assumed office on January 11, 2021.

Committee assignments

- K-12 Education Budget
- Veterans and Military
- Children and Seniors
