= Barbara Ballard =

American politician (born 1944)

Member of the Kansas House of Representatives from the 44th district
- Incumbent
- Assumed office January 11, 1993
- Preceded by: Sandy Praeger

Personal details
- Born: November 14, 1944 (age 81) Petersburg, Virginia, U.S.
- Party: Democratic
- Spouse: Albert Ballard
- Education: Webster College (BMEd); Kansas State University (MS, PhD)

Barbara W. Ballard (born November 14, 1944) is a Democratic member of the Kansas House of Representatives, representing the 44th district. Born in Petersburg, Virginia, she has served since 1993.

Prior to her election to the House, Ballard served on the Lawrence School Board from 1985 to 1993. Ballard is treasurer of the Kansas African American Legislative Caucus.

Ballard earned a bachelor's degree from Webster College in 1967, a Master of Science in 1976 and a doctorate in 1980, both from Kansas State University. She worked as an elementary school teacher, and from 1980 until 2004 was dean of students at the University of Kansas as well as director of the Emily Taylor Women's Resource Center. She is now the senior associate director at the Dole Institute of Politics.

Ballard is the chairwoman of the House Democratic Caucus.
