= Valdenia Winn =

American politician (born 1950)

Valdenia C. Winn

Member of the Kansas House of Representatives from the 34th district
- Incumbent
- Assumed office January 8, 2001
- Preceded by: David Haley

Personal details
- Born: December 7, 1950 (age 75) Kansas City, Kansas, U.S.
- Party: Democratic
- Spouse: Keith V. Persley
- Education: University of Kansas (BSEd, MA, PhD)
- Profession: Community college professor

Valdenia Camille "Val" Winn (born December 7, 1950) is a member of the Kansas House of Representatives, representing the 34th district. A Democrat, she has served since 2001.

Since 1972, Winn has worked as a professor at Kansas City Kansas Community College. Dr. Winn currently serves as the Vice President of the Kansas City Kansas Public Schools Board of Education.

== Early life and education ==
Winn received a bachelor's degree in Secondary Education (1972), a Master's in History, and a PhD (1994) History from the University of Kansas.

== Career ==
Winn is currently the chairman/treasurer for the Northeast Coalition, treasurer for the Northeast Cooperative Council, and a member of the Struggler's Hill/Roots Neighborhood Association.

She is a member of the Governor's Council on Travel & Tourism, and a previous member of the Health for All Kansas Steering Commission, Kansas Incorporated Strategic Planning Steering Committee, Governor's Council on Development of Including Kansas, and Kansas Sesquicentennial Steering Commission.

In March 2015, Republicans proposed ejecting her from the legislature, after she'd referred to actions taken by Republican colleagues as "racist." The bill would have denied lower in-state tuition to undocumented immigrants. Winn, the ranking Democrat on the committee considering the proposed legislation explained her objections to it. "This is a racist, sexist, fear-mongering bill." "I would like first to apologize to the progressively-minded people of Kansas who are appalled that we are turning back the hands of time." She characterized the proponents as employing, "Jim Crow tactics, once again making Kansas a laughingstock." She apologized, "...to the students and their parents whose lives are being hijacked by the racist bigots who support this bill."

=== Elections ===
From 2008 through 2020, Winn had no opposition in the primaries or in the general elections. In 2015, she also ran for Kansas City Kansas Public Schools Board, winning a four-year term.
