= Lindsay Vaughn =

American politician

Member of the Kansas House of Representatives from the 22nd district
- Incumbent
- Assumed office January 11, 2021
- Preceded by: Nancy Lusk

Personal details
- Born: Overland Park, Kansas, U.S.
- Party: Democratic
- Education: University of North Carolina at Chapel Hill (BA)

Lindsay Vaughn is an American politician serving as a member of the Kansas House of Representatives from the 22nd district. Elected in the November 2020, she assumed office on January 11, 2021.

== Early life and education ==
Vaughn was born in Overland Park, Kansas, and graduated from Blue Valley Northwest High School. She earned a Bachelor of Arts degree in political science and cultural anthropology from the University of North Carolina at Chapel Hill.

== Career ==
Vaughn has worked as a volunteer coordinator for Literary KC. In 2018, she was a field organizer for Sharice Davids. She was also the chair of the Johnson County Young Democrats. She worked on the campaigns of state representatives Brett Parker and Brandon Woodard.

Vaughn was elected to the Kansas House of Representatives in November 2020 and assumed office on January 11, 2021.

She has led efforts to protect groundwater in Kansas by endorsing legislation to curtail pumping in the state. She has also sponsored legislation to abolish Capital punishment in Kansas.
