= Jesse Borjon =

American politician and businessman

Member of the Kansas House of Representatives from the 52nd district
- Incumbent
- Assumed office January 11, 2021
- Preceded by: Brenda Dietrich

Personal details
- Born: February 18, 1975 (age 51) Topeka, Kansas, U.S.
- Party: Republican
- Children: 3
- Education: Washburn University (BA)

Jesse Borjon is an American politician and businessman serving as a member of the Kansas House of Representatives from the 52nd district. Elected in November 2020, he assumed office on January 11, 2021.

== Early life and education ==
Born and raised in Topeka, Kansas, Borjon earned a Bachelor of Arts degree in political science from Washburn University.

== Career ==
Prior to entering politics, Borjon owned a retail store and property management company. He also served as director of the Kansas Corporation Commission for public affairs and consumer protection. He also worked as a spokesperson for former Kansas Secretary of State Ron Thornburgh during the 2010 Kansas gubernatorial election.
