= Adam Smith (Kansas politician) =

American politician

Member of the Kansas House of Representatives from the 120th district
- Incumbent
- Assumed office January 9, 2017
- Preceded by: Rick Billinger

Personal details
- Born: Kansas, U.S.
- Party: Republican
- Spouse: Christine
- Children: 3
- Education: Kansas State University (BS)

Adam W. Smith is an American politician serving as a member of the Kansas House of Representatives from the 120th district. Elected in November 2016, he assumed office on January 9, 2017. He was appointed chairman of Rural Revitalization Committee in 2020. He was appointed chairman of the Taxation Committee in 2021.

== Early life and education ==
Born in Kansas, Smith was raised in the unincorporated community of Weskan. Smith earned a Bachelor of Science degree in animal science, agronomy, and agricultural technology management from Kansas State University.

== Career ==
Outside of politics, Smith has worked as a farmer and rancher. He was elected to the Kansas House of Representatives in November 2016 and assumed office on January 9, 2017. During the 2019–2020 legislative session, Smith served as vice chair of the House Rural Revitalization Committee. Since 2021, he has served as chair of the House Taxation Committee.
