= Clarke Sanders =

American politician

Member of the Kansas House of Representatives from the 69th district
- Incumbent
- Assumed office January 11, 2021
- Preceded by: J. R. Claeys

Personal details
- Party: Republican

Clarke Sanders is an American politician. He serves as a Republican member for the 69th district of the Kansas House of Representatives.

== Career ==
In 2020, Sanders gave an interview where he declared support for the "Value Them Both" Amendment, the 2nd Amendment, and term limits of six years for Kansas Representatives. He indicated that he did not support expanding Medicaid due to the costs. He has also expressed support for medical marijuana, and pledged to vote in favor of it in the legislature.

In 2021, Sanders was elected for the 69th district of the Kansas House of Representatives. He succeeded J. R. Claeys. Sanders assumed office on January 11, 2021. Sanders serves on the committees for Taxation, Federal and State Affairs, and Education. Prior to his time in the legislature, he was a radio personality for the radio broadcasting station KSAL, hosting Friendly Fire and The Clarke Sanders Show. He has also served as the President of Salinians for Life.

Sanders opposed Trump's push the Kansas legislature to redistrict its congressional maps, which would have net Republicans an additional seat in the U.S. House of Representatives.
