= Jim Minnix =

Kansas state politician

Member of the Kansas House of Representatives from the 118th district
- Incumbent
- Assumed office January 11, 2021
- Preceded by: Don Hineman

Personal details
- Party: Republican
- Spouse: Eileen Minnix
- Education: Colby Community College; Kansas State University

Jim Minnix is a state representative in the Kansas House of Representatives, representing the 118th district. Elected in November 2020, he assumed office on January 11, 2021. Minnix is a Republican.

== Early life and education ==
Minnix graduated from Scott Community High School in 1972 and earned a degree at Colby Community College in 1974. He also earned a Bachelor of Science degree in agricultural economics from Kansas State University in 1977, a Bachelor of Science degree in business finance in 1978, and a Master of Business Administration in 1980.

== Political career ==
Minnix served as a Scott County Commissioner for 25 years. In March 2020, he announced his candidacy for State House in the 118th district as a Republican. He won the Republican primary on August 4, 2020 and won the general election on November 3, 2020.

2021-2022 Kansas House of Representatives Committee Assignments

- Water
- Transportation
- Agriculture

== Personal life ==
Minnix is married to Eileen. They have three children and three grandchildren.
