= Leo Delperdang =

American politician

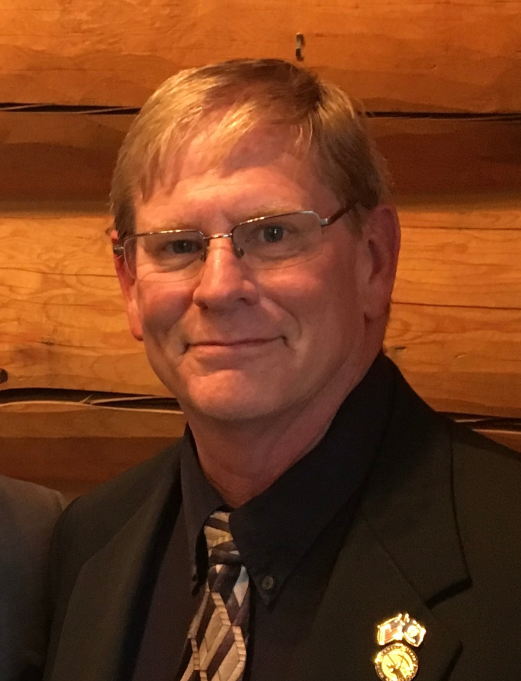

Member of the Kansas House of Representatives from the 94th district
- Incumbent
- Assumed office January 9, 2017
- Preceded by: Mario Goico

Personal details
- Born: February 18, 1962 (age 64) Sioux City, Iowa, U.S.
- Party: Republican
- Spouse: Connie
- Children: 2
- Education: Newman; University of Nebraska Omaha; Iowa Western Community College

Leo Delperdang (born February 18, 1962) is an American politician. He has served as a Republican member for the 94th district in the Kansas House of Representatives since 2017. He and his wife have two sons. He has an engineering degree and a Masters of Business Administration degree. He has been active in the Kansas Patriot Guard and his local west-side Wichita neighborhood association. He was endorsed by Kansans for Life, the National Rifle Association, the Wichita Chamber of Commerce and the Wichita Builders Association.
