= Ken Corbet =

American politician

Member of the Kansas House of Representatives from the 54th district
- Incumbent
- Assumed office January 14, 2013
- Preceded by: Joe Patton

Personal details
- Born: August 19, 1948 (age 77) Topeka, Kansas, U.S.
- Party: Republican
- Spouse: Beverly

Kenneth "Ken" Corbet (August 19, 1948) is Republican member of the Kansas House of Representatives, representing the 54th district (Topeka in Shawnee County, Kansas).
