= Nick Hoheisel =

American Politician

Member of the Kansas House of Representatives from the 97th district
- Incumbent
- Assumed office January 14, 2019
- Preceded by: Leslie Osterman

Personal details
- Party: Republican
- Spouse: Misti
- Children: 2

Nick Hoheisel is an American politician serving as a member of the Kansas House of Representatives from the 97th district. Elected in November 2018, he assumed office in 2019. Hoheisel is a native of Wichita, Kansas.
