= Francis Awerkamp =

American politician

Member of the Kansas House of Representatives from the 61st district
- Incumbent
- Assumed office January 9, 2017
- Preceded by: Becky Hutchins

Personal details
- Born: September 20, 1980 (age 45) St. Marys, Kansas, U.S.
- Party: Republican

Francis Awerkamp (born September 20, 1980) is an American politician who has served in the Kansas House of Representatives from the 61st district since 2017.
