= Bill Sutton (Kansas politician) =

American politician

Member of the Kansas House of Representatives from the 43rd district
- Incumbent
- Assumed office January 14, 2013
- Preceded by: Mike Kiegerl

Personal details
- Born: William Sutton; August 31, 1967 (age 58) Kansas City, Kansas, U.S.
- Party: Republican
- Spouse: Lana
- Children: 3

William Sutton (born August 31, 1967) is an American politician serving as a member of the Kansas House of Representatives from the 43rd district. Elected in November 2012, he assumed office on January 14, 2013.

== Background ==
Sutton was born and raised in Kansas City, Kansas. Outside of politics, Sutton has worked for Steel & Pipe Supply. He was elected to the Kansas House of Representatives in November 2012 and assumed office on January 14, 2013. During the 2017 legislative session, Sutton served as chair of the House General Government Budget. In 2019 and 2020, he served as chair of the House Elections Committee.
