= Mari-Lynn Poskin =

Kansas politician

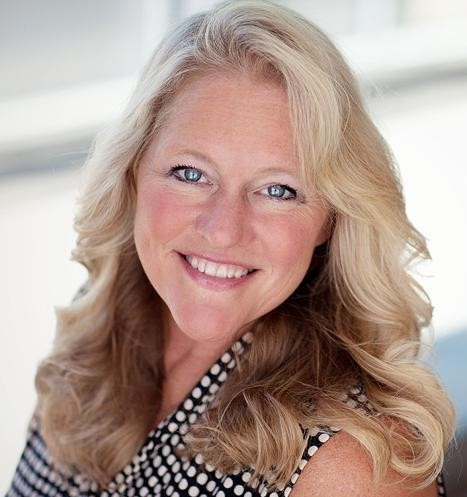

Member of the Kansas House of Representatives from the 20th district
- Incumbent
- Assumed office January 11, 2021
- Preceded by: Jan Kessinger

Personal details
- Born: Merced, California, U.S.
- Party: Democratic
- Education: University of Nebraska–Lincoln (BS)

Mari-Lynn Poskin is an American politician serving as a member of the Kansas House of Representatives from the 20th district. Originally elected in November 2020, she assumed office on January 11, 2021.

== Early life and education ==
Poskin was born in Merced, California. After attending the University of Southern California, she earned a Bachelor of Science degree in English, psychology, and education from the University of Nebraska–Lincoln.

== Career ==
Poskin has also had experience as a small business owner and in higher education. She was elected to the Kansas House of Representatives in November 2020, where she was endorsed by President Barack Obama. She assumed office on January 11, 2021. She was reelected in 2022 and 2024.

She represents parts of Leawood and parts of Overland Park.

2020 Kansas House of Representatives District 20
Party	Candidate	Votes	%
Democratic	Mari-Lynn Poskin	8,249	51.55
Republican	Jane Dirks	7,752	48.45

2022 Kansas House of Representatives District 20
Party	Candidate	Votes	%
Democratic	Mari-Lynn Poskin (incumbent)	7,048	55.70
Republican	Carrie Rahfaldt	5,606	44.30

2024 Kansas House of Representatives District 20
Party	Candidate	Votes	%
Democratic	Mari-Lynn Poskin (incumbent)	8,826	57.58
Republican	Jerry Charlton	6,501	42.42

== Personal life ==
Poskin lives in Leawood with her husband, David. They have seven children and three grandchildren.
