= Jarrod Ousley =

American politician

Member of the Kansas House of Representatives from the 24th district
- Incumbent
- Assumed office January 12, 2015
- Preceded by: Emily Perry

Personal details
- Born: October 29, 1977 (age 48)
- Party: Democratic

Jarrod Ousley (born October 29, 1977) is an American politician who has served in the Kansas House of Representatives from the 24th district since 2015.
