= Jerry Stogsdill =

American politician from Kansas

Member of the Kansas House of Representatives from the 21st district
- Incumbent
- Assumed office January 9, 2017
- Preceded by: Barbara Bollier

Personal details
- Born: June 15, 1947 (age 79) Topeka, Kansas, U.S.
- Party: Democratic
- Spouse: Deanna Hunter
- Children: 1
- Profession: Real Estate Investor,

Jerry Stogsdill (born June 15, 1947) is an American politician. He has served as a Democratic member for the 21st district in the Kansas House of Representatives since 2017.
