= Linda Featherston =

American politician

Member of the Kansas House of Representatives from the 16th district
- Incumbent
- Assumed office January 11, 2021
- Preceded by: Cindy Holscher

Personal details
- Born: Topeka, Kansas, U.S.
- Party: Democratic
- Education: Kansas State University (BME, MM)

Linda Featherston is an American politician and music teacher serving as a member of the Kansas House of Representatives from the 16th district. Elected in November 2020, she assumed office on January 11, 2021.

== Early life and education ==
Featherston was born and raised in Topeka, Kansas. She earned a bachelor's degree in music education and master's degree in music history from Kansas State University.

== Career ==
Featherston has worked as a piano teacher. She became involved in politics while working as a campaign volunteer for her predecessor, Cindy Holscher. She was elected to the Kansas House of Representatives in November 2020 and she assumed office on January 11, 2021.
