= Lisa Moser (politician) =

American politician

Member of the Kansas House of Representatives from the 106th district
- Incumbent
- Assumed office January 11, 2021
- Preceded by: Bill Pannbacker

Personal details
- Party: Republican
- Education: Kansas State University (BS)

Lisa Moser is an American businesswoman, rancher, and politician serving as a member of the Kansas House of Representatives from the 106th district.

== Background ==
Moser earned a Bachelor of Science degree in animal science from Kansas State University in 1981. Mosner has worked as a farmer and is the co-owner of Moser Ranch. Elected to the Kansas House of Representatives in November 2020, she assumed office on January 11, 2021.
