= Brandon Woodard =

American politician from Kansas (born 1990)

Minority Leader of the Kansas House of Representatives
- Incumbent
- Assumed office January 10, 2025
- Preceded by: Vic Miller

Member of the Kansas House of Representatives from the 108th district
- Incumbent
- Assumed office January 14, 2019
- Preceded by: Randy Powell

Personal details
- Born: September 1, 1990 (age 36) Topeka, Kansas, U.S.
- Party: Democratic
- Education: University of Kansas (BA)
- Website: Campaign website

Brandon Woodard is an American politician currently serving in the Kansas House of Representatives, representing the 108th House District as a member of the Democratic Party. Woodard was elected House Minority Leader in December 2024.

Openly gay, he was elected alongside Susan Ruiz as one of the state's first-ever LGBT state legislators. During the campaign, he weathered a controversy when it was revealed that he had previously spent five days in jail for a second offense of driving under the influence.

He has been the Ranking Minority Member of the House Higher Education Budget Committee since January 2020, succeeding Democrat Brandon Whipple, who left the Kansas House of Representatives after being elected Mayor of Wichita, Kansas.

2019-2020 House Committee Assignments

- Ranking Minority Member of Higher Education Budget (2020)
- Federal and State Affairs
- Insurance
- Member of Higher Education Budget (2019)

Kansas House of Representatives
Preceded by Vic Miller	Minority Leader of the Kansas House of Representatives; 2025–present	Incumbent
