= 2007 Wichita mayoral election =

- February 27, 2007 (primary); April 3, 2007 (general)
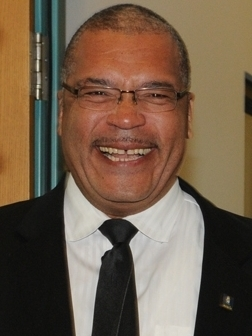

Candidate	Carl Brewer	Carlos Mayans
Popular vote	28,390	17,230
Percentage	61.7%	37.5%
Mayor before election
Carlos Mayans
Republican
Elected mayor
Carl Brewer
Democratic

The 2007 Wichita mayoral election took place on April 3, 2007, to elect the Mayor of Wichita, Kansas. The election was held concurrently with various other local elections, and was officially nonpartisan. It saw the election of Carl Brewer, who unseated incumbent mayor Carlos Mayans. Brewer was the first African American to be elected mayor of Wichita.

== Results ==
=== Primary ===
Primary results
Party	Candidate	Votes	%
Nonpartisan	Carl Brewer	13,155	57.7
Nonpartisan	Carlos Mayans (incumbent)	5,882	25.8
Nonpartisan	Larry G. White	1,474	6.5
Nonpartisan	Darrell E. Leffew	984	4.3
Nonpartisan	James D. Mendenhall	742	3.3
Nonpartisan	Randy Pace	327	1.4
Nonpartisan	King David Davis	250	1.1
Turnout		22,814	11.79

=== General election ===
General election results
Party	Candidate	Votes	%
Nonpartisan	Carl Brewer	28,390	61.7
Nonpartisan	Carlos Mayans (incumbent)	17,230	37.5
Write-in		359	0.8
Turnout		45,979	19.53
