= Brandon Whipple =

American politician (born 1982)

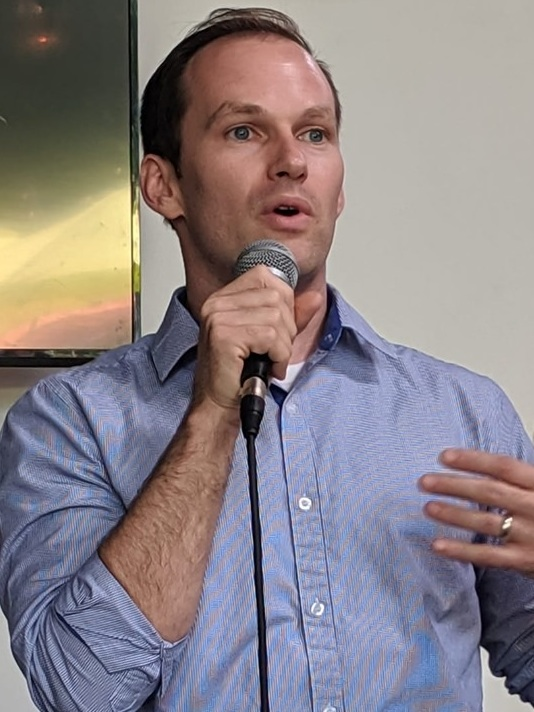

102nd Mayor of Wichita
- In office January 13, 2020 – January 8, 2024
- Preceded by: Jeff Longwell
- Succeeded by: Lily Wu

Member of the Kansas House of Representatives from the 96th district
- In office January 14, 2013 – January 13, 2020
- Preceded by: Phil Hermanson
- Succeeded by: Stephanie Yeager

Personal details
- Born: Brandon James Whipple; July 13, 1982 (age 44) Rochester, New Hampshire, U.S.
- Party: Democratic
- Education: Mount Washington College; Wichita State University (BA, MA); Franklin Pierce University (DArts); University of the People (MBA)

Brandon Whipple (born July 13, 1982) is an American politician and academic who formerly served as mayor of Wichita, Kansas. He previously served as a Democratic Party member of the Kansas House of Representatives representing the 96th district, which included part of south Wichita and was the Ranking Minority member on the Higher Education Budget committee.

When the Kansas Legislature was not in session, Whipple served as an adjunct professor of American politics at Wichita State University, his alma mater. Whipple defeated incumbent Jeff Longwell in the 2019 Wichita mayoral election. He ran for a second term as mayor in the 2023 Wichita mayoral election, but lost to Lily Wu.

== Early life and education ==
Whipple was raised in Dover, New Hampshire.

Whipple earned his Associate of Arts in liberal studies from New Hampshire's Hesser College in 2003. He moved to Wichita, Kansas, at age 21 in a year-long education-service mission with AmeriCorps, working with at-risk youth at Wichita South High School. While there, he discovered he could afford to attend Wichita State University (WSU). He graduated from WSU with a bachelor's degree in sociology and a minor in psychology; later at WSU, he earned a master's degree in liberal studies, with an emphasis on cross-cultural studies and public administration. While at Wichita State, Whipple was a student senator in WSU's Student Government Association, an experience he credits as decisive in his later entry into the Kansas legislature (particularly a trip to the state capitol to lobby for student issues).

Whipple later acquired a Doctor of Arts in leadership studies from Franklin Pierce University, a private college in New Hampshire.

== Career ==
As a member of Wichita's Southwest Neighborhood Association, Whipple served on its executive board.

Whipple first ran for the Kansas House of Representatives in 2010 against Phil Hermanson. Whipple lost, but shortly afterward the Sedgwick County Democratic Party elected him its vice chair. In 2012, he was elected the county party's chair.

Subsequently, while serving in the Kansas Legislature, Whipple also served as an adjunct instructor for various Wichita-area colleges and universities, including Wichita State University, Southwestern College and some commercial colleges—particularly teaching political science, history and sociology.

=== Kansas House of Representatives ===
In 2012, in a run for the Kansas House 96th District seat (in south Wichita), he was criticized by Tea Party Republican Craig Gable for not having children. Whipple defeated Republican Rick Lindsey. Whipple was re-elected to the seat in 2014, 2016 and 2018, in a district that voted for Donald Trump for president in 2016.

In 2016, Whipple was elected Agenda Chair for the Democrats in the Kansas House of Representatives—the #6 position in House Democratic party leadership. In 2018, he co-founded the bipartisan Kansas Future Caucus, a group of under-45 Kansas legislators, to focus attention on issues of concern to young people.

Among his principal efforts in office was increased funding for education, particularly restoration of funding cuts made during the administration of Kansas governor Sam Brownback.

In the 2019 Kansas Legislature, Whipple was Ranking minority member on the Joint Committee on Information Technology, and the Higher Education Budget Committee. He was also assigned to the Committee on Elections and the Joint Committee on Corrections and Juvenile Justice Oversight.

==== Committee assignments ====
2019–2020 session

- Ranking Minority Member of Higher Education Budget
- Ranking Minority Member of Joint Information Technology
- Elections
- Joint Corrections and Juvenile Justice

2017–2018 session

- Ranking Minority Member of Commerce, Labor and Economic Development
- Financial Institutions and Pensions
- Higher Education Budget
- Joint Information Technology

2015–2016 session

- Utilities and Telecommications
- Commerce, Labor and Economic Development
- Taxation
- House Select Investigating Committee
- Telecommunications Study Committee
- Joint Information Technology

2013–2014 session

- Children and Seniors
- Judiciary
- Utilities and Telecommications
- Commerce, Labor and Economic Development
- Telecommunications Study Committee
- Joint Information Technology

=== Wichita Mayor ===
==== 2019 Wichita mayoral race ====
Whipple ran in the 2019 election for mayor of Wichita. In the nonpartisan primary election, preliminary results put Whipple (with 5,729 votes; 25.9% of the total) second only to Republican Mayor Longwell (who had 7,136 votes; 32.3%).

Candidate Lyndy Wells, also a Republican, had only 160 votes fewer in initial returns: 5,569 votes; 25.2%, so delayed acceptance of the result in hopes that a review of 1,000 yet-uncounted ballots (including 500 provisional ballots) might turn the election to his favor. The final count nearly doubled Whipple's lead over Wells, advancing Whipple and Longwell to the ballot for the November 5 runoff election. Wells mounted a write-in campaign.

In October 2019, Whipple found himself the victim of an elaborate, multi-state, covert smear campaign in which Republican state Representative Michael Capps was implicated as a perpetrator. After Sedgwick County, Kansas Republican party chair Dalton Glasscock called for Capps to resign, Capps claimed that Glasscock had actually approved the production of the ad, which Glasscock denied.

Money raised for the production of the video was alleged to have been laundered through a charitable non-profit organization directed by Capps to conceal the identities of the alleged perpetrators.

Newly created anonymous entities also attacked both Whipple and Wells weighed via several mailers. Although the sending organizations used different names, they were all linked through a postal permit held by a Kansas City bulk-mail service. The funding of the salacious video as well as the anonymous mailers will not be required to be reported, according to the Kansas Governmental Ethics Commission. It has ruled outside organizations must report their identities and spending only if they use specific key terms such as "vote for," "elect," "vote against" or "defeat". The Democratic party was also criticized for publicly sending a mailer claiming that Longwell was being investigated by the District Attorney for "corruption". In fact, he had just been advised to report contributions and gifts received from the contractor to which a half-billion-dollar contract had been awarded.

On election day, November 5, 2019, Longwell conceded the election to Whipple, who won with 46% of the ballots versus 36% for Longwell, with the balance cast for write-in candidates which remained to be counted. The results were certified on November 15, 2019.

In October 2020, Whipple, represented by former U.S. Attorney Randy Rathbun, filed suit against Capps, Wichita City Councilman James Clendenin, and Sedgwick County Commissioner Michael O'Donnell, for defamation involving the false charges made against him in the 2019 mayoral election race. Allegations cited were that the co-conspirators tried to blame the conspiracy on Sedgwick Republican County Committee Chairman Dalton Glasscock, and that, with false accusations, they intended to generate marital discord within Whipple's own family.

To conceal the donors and funding of the smear, monies were said to have been laundered through a 501(c)3 non-profit charity directed by Capps. The suit had originally been filed against the maker of the video, Matthew Colburn. It was dropped after Colburn provided audio, text messages, and other evidence, that had identified O'Donnell as the alleged leader of the conspiracy to defame Whipple. O'Donnell was accused of writing the script for the video frame-up, Whipple said that he felt sorry for the then-21-year-old Colburn who had been scapegoated by the actual perpetrators.

On November 25, Marc Bennett, the Sedgwick County D.A., moved to have the state take up the case of the removal of Capps from office since the D.A. is precluded from doing so by statute in the case of a state legislator. He was proceeding to remove Clendenin from the City Council where he possessed such authority.

==== Tenure ====
===== COVID-19 pandemic response =====
Whipple entered office about the time the COVID-19 pandemic erupted. The state governor, Laura Kelly, issued a requirement for the community to wear face masks in public to prevent the spread of the highly contagious disease, which had become widely fatal. However, the conservative state legislature outlawed her mandate, and the conservative local county commission, ignoring advice of its Health Director, withdrew its corresponding mask mandate and other restrictions, to Whipple's dismay.

Responding, Whipple "spearheaded" a move by the City Council to re-impose the mask mandate within the city limits—over intense opposition from many in the community, including around 100 who showed up to protest at the City Council meeting. The Council passed the ordinance, but many bitterly resented it, and blamed Whipple.

===== Death threat =====
On October 16, 2020, Meredith Dowty, a 59-year-old local musician and retired firefighter, was arrested on suspicion of threatening to kidnap and kill Whipple after he attempted to get Whipple's address from another city official. He was reportedly frustrated by the city's mask ordinance and other mitigation measures against the COVID-19 pandemic, which prevented him from seeing his mother. Whipple, who had been a target of local criticism for passing the ordinance, said he will increase security at his home in response to the alleged threat.

In October 2020, prosecutors charged Dowty with three felony counts of criminal threats causing "terror, evacuation or disruption." Shortly before trial, in May 2023, he pled "no contest" to a lesser charge of disorderly conduct, and was sentenced to two years probation, with the threat of 30 days in jail if violating the terms of probation.

===== City Council ethics policy =====
In keeping with a campaign promise, in reaction to the developer-dealings of the prior City Council, Whipple pushed for a City Council Code of Ethics—which forbid Council members to vote on matters which had a material benefit to them personally or to a member of their immediate family, and restricted Council members from accepting gifts that represented a conflict-of-interest. The Code had further provisions as well. It was adopted by the City Council in May, 2021.

===== Land development =====
Whipple, along with nearly all City Council members, approved the controversial bargain sale and subsequent development of city land on the West Bank of the Arkansas River, opposite downtown, into apartment and hotel buildings, adjacent to the city's new ballpark, saying it was needed to improve the city's quantity of housing and to offset the costs of the costly new ballpark, which had been a financial failure for the city. However, Whipple expressed reluctance to fully trust the same developers with the new project.

In this case, and others, Whipple urged greater transparency in the deals, and prior public notice of the details, opposing "secret" deals between the city and developers.

===== Juvenile death in law enforcement custody =====
September 24, 2021, a mentally ill juvenile, Cedric Lofton, died while physically restrained in a county juvenile detention center, where he had been taken by Wichita police. When the local district attorney refused to file charges against any involved, Whipple publicized police bodycam footage that exposed police to increased criticism for their handling of the youth.

Whipple appeared critical of the police decision to arrest Lofton rather than take him to a mental care facility—a criticism opposed by the local police union.

===== Police exchanges of bigoted messages =====
March, 2022, it was revealed that a small group of local law enforcement officers, including 13 Wichita Police officers—some of them members of the SWAT team, and some who had shot civilians—had been exchanging racist, sexist and homophobic text messages, and jokes about shooting people, a year earlier.

While the County had dismissed its officers involved, the Wichita officers involved had received only disciplinary action. Responding, the city's Citizens' Review Board (CRB) and the local newspaper made the matter public, resulting in pressure for more aggressive discipline, ultimately resulting in 3 officers resigning, 3 suspended, and others reprimanded.

Though an ordinance forbid the mayor and council from controlling the City's discipline of employees, Whipple initially said, "We should not be tolerating this type of behavior from any employees in our city," promising to make the issue a "top priority.”

===== Confrontation with police =====
On September 24, 2022, while at a community cleanup event—delivering trash from his nearby rental property—Whipple became involved in a verbal altercation with a Wichita Police officer after cutting in line at a dump site, and then resisting the officer's orders to turn around.

In footage obtained from the officer's body-worn camera, Whipple is seen calling City Manager Robert Layton and telling him that the officer "doesn't know who I am," before requesting the name of the acting chief of police so that he could file a complaint.

Whipple released the footage, himself, on October 13, after learning the officer's body camera was not turned on for the beginning of the altercation, during which Whipple claimed the officer yelled at him. Whipple used the situation to call for a review of Wichita police body-camera policies, but ultimately apologized for his role in the event.

The local police union expressed offense, countering that the video Whipple released was not complete, and claimed that Whipple's version of the story was false or exaggerated. They said the officer had been defamed by Whipple and his political associates, and called for an apology.

On May 11, 2023, the City of Wichita Ethics Board ruled 4-0 that Whipple had violated the city code of ethics, concluding that he had, "Used his office to seek favor and private gain by the manner in which he sought to dump his trash instead of waiting in line," and further cited him for using "his unique direct access to the city manager [by calling] him during an encounter with a police officer, on a Saturday, to make a complaint about the officer."

===== Roller rink conflict =====
New Year's Eve 2022/2023, there was an incident at a roller skating rink in which Wichita PD said that off-duty officers were attempting to remove a teenager who had been threatening staff when another teenager hit one of the officers on the back of the head. Video from after showed the teen and the officer in a physical altercation. Two days later Whipple gave a statement at a press conference stating:

When I saw a grown trained armed man with 100 pounds on that kid posture up and try to kill him with a punch like that. I know that this could have been a lot worse. He didn't deserve to be thrown into a wall, slammed to the ground and have someone sit on his back, and then handcuffed.

The local Fraternal Order of Police lodge responded, stating: "We would hope the Mayor who is tasked with leading the city would not make reckless statements without knowing all the facts and context, this only causes more division within the community."

==== 2023 mayoral election ====
===== 2023 mayoral primary election =====
In the primary, Whipple was opposed by several candidates in the non-partisan Mayoral primary, particularly including strong opposition from:

- City Council Member Bryan Frye (widely backed by the business community)
- Celeste Racette (a community activist who led a campaign to save Century II convention center from demolition); and
- Lily Wu, a former TV reporter, and political newcomer.

...each of whom raised more campaign donations than Whipple, particularly Wu and Frye.

Wu (with 30% of the vote) and Whipple (with 24% of the vote, narrowly defeating Bryan Frye) were the two top vote-getters, and proceeded to the 2023 Wichita City General Election.

===== 2023 mayoral general election =====
The general election campaign was bitterly contested, and heavily covered in local media, with multiple head-to-head candidate debates and joint appearances at various public forums. But most public contact was through extensive advertising campaigns by the candidates and their supporters.

Whipple received support from a PAC run by his wife, the Kansas Democratic Party, and from the local firefighters' union.

Wu far outdistanced Whipple in campaign donations, receiving broad support from the business community, including over $440,000 in direct donations, plus over $192,000 spent by Americans for Prosperity (created by Wichita billionaire Charles Koch and his brother David)—and from the local police union.

With 24% of registered voters voting, Whipple (42%) lost to Wu (58%), who was sworn in on January 8, 2024.

== Personal life ==
Whipple is married to Chelsea (Grady) Whipple, also a Wichita State University graduate. The two are members of the Episcopal Church. The couple has three boys.

== Elections ==
Wichita mayoral election, 2023
Primary election
Party	Candidate	Votes	%
Nonpartisan	Lily Wu	12,217	30.0
Nonpartisan	Brandon Whipple (incumbent)	9,775	24.0
Nonpartisan	Bryan Frye	9,070	22.3
Nonpartisan	Celeste Racette	6,831	16.8
Nonpartisan	Jared Cerullo	1,870	4.6
Nonpartisan	Shelia M Davis (Rainman)	254	0.6
Nonpartisan	Julie Rose Stroud	246	0.6
Nonpartisan	Tom Kane	220	0.5
Nonpartisan	Anthony Gallardo	182	0.4
Total votes		40,665	100.0
General election
Nonpartisan	Lily Wu	37,004	57.6
Nonpartisan	Brandon Whipple (incumbent)	26,841	41.8
Nonpartisan	Write-in	415	0.6
Total votes		48,288	100.0

Wichita mayoral election, 2019
Primary election
Party	Candidate	Votes	%
Nonpartisan	Jeff Longwell (incumbent)	7,409	32.1
Nonpartisan	Brandon Whipple	6,067	26.3
Nonpartisan	Lyndy Wells	5,770	25.0
Nonpartisan	Amy Lyon	1,470	6.4
Nonpartisan	Mark Gietzen	1,349	5.8
Nonpartisan	Brock Booker	457	2.0
Nonpartisan	Ian Demory	239	1.0
Nonpartisan	Joshua Atkinson	166	0.7
Nonpartisan	Marty Mork	144	0.6
Total votes		23,071	100.0
General election
Nonpartisan	Brandon Whipple	22,256	46.1
Nonpartisan	Jeff Longwell (incumbent)	17,516	36.3
Nonpartisan	Write-in	8,516	17.6
Total votes		48,288	100.0

Kansas House of Representatives 96th district election, 2018
Party	Candidate	Votes	%
Democratic	Brandon Whipple (incumbent)	3,483	94.7
Nonpartisan	Write-in	196	5.3
Total votes		3,679	100.0
Democratic hold			

Kansas House of Representatives 96th district election, 2016
Party	Candidate	Votes	%
Democratic	Brandon Whipple (incumbent)	4,346	97.3
Nonpartisan	Write-in	120	2.7
Total votes		4,466	100.0
Democratic hold			

Kansas House of Representatives 96th district election, 2014
Party	Candidate	Votes	%
Democratic	Brandon Whipple (incumbent)	2,544	56.1
Republican	Rick Lindsey	1,983	43.8
Total votes		4,531	100.0
Democratic hold			

Kansas House of Representatives 96th district election, 2012
Party	Candidate	Votes	%
Democratic	Brandon Whipple	3,509	58.4
Republican	Rick Lindsey	2,490	41.4
Total votes		6,008	100.0
Democratic gain from Republican			

Kansas House of Representatives 96th district election, 2010
Party	Candidate	Votes	%
Republican	Phil Hermanson (incumbent)	2,660	52.9
Democratic	Brandon Whipple	2,355	46.8
Total votes		5,027	100.0
Republican hold			

Kansas House of Representatives
Preceded by Phil Hermanson	Member of the Kansas House of Representatives from the 96th district 2013–2020	Succeeded by Stephanie Yeager
Political offices
Preceded by Jeff Longwell	Mayor of Wichita; 2020–2024	Succeeded by Lily Wu
