= 2011 Wichita mayoral election =

- March 1, 2011 (primary); April 5, 2011 (general)
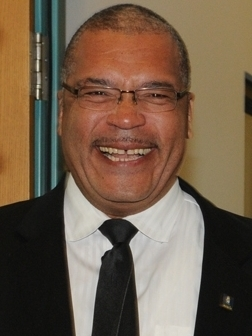

| Candidate | Carl Brewer | Darrell E. Leffew |
| Popular vote | 17,285 | 7,494 |
| Percentage | 69.6% | 30.2% |
Mayor before election
Carl Brewer
Democratic
Elected mayor
Carl Brewer
Democratic

The 2011 Wichita mayoral election took place on April 5, 2011, to elect the Mayor of Wichita, Kansas. The election was held concurrently with various other local elections, and was officially nonpartisan. It saw the reelection of incumbent mayor Carl Brewer.

== Results ==
=== Primary ===
Primary results
| Party | Candidate | Votes | % |
|---|---|---|---|
| Nonpartisan | Carl Brewer (incumbent) | 11,401 | 76.9 |
| Nonpartisan | Darrell E. Leffew | 1,470 | 9.9 |
| Nonpartisan | Paul Rhodes | 800 | 5.4 |
| Nonpartisan | Martin "Marty" Mork | 546 | 3.7 |
| Nonpartisan | Roy R. Malcom | 302 | 2.0 |
| Nonpartisan | Scott Thode | 308 | 2.1 |
| Turnout | | 14,827 | 7.37 |

=== General election ===
General election results
| Party | Candidate | Votes | % |
|---|---|---|---|
| Nonpartisan | Carl Brewer (incumbent) | 17,285 | 69.6 |
| Nonpartisan | Darrell E. Leffew | 7,494 | 30.2 |
| Write-in | | 66 | 0.2 |
| Turnout | | 24,845 | 9.57 |
