= McLeland =

McLeland is a surname. Notable people with the surname include:

- Albert McLeland, American football and basketball coach
- Joe McLeland (born 1946), American politician
- Wayne McLeland (1924–2004), American baseball player

== See also ==
- McClelland
