= 2019 Wichita mayoral election =

- August 6 (primary); November 5, 2019 (general)
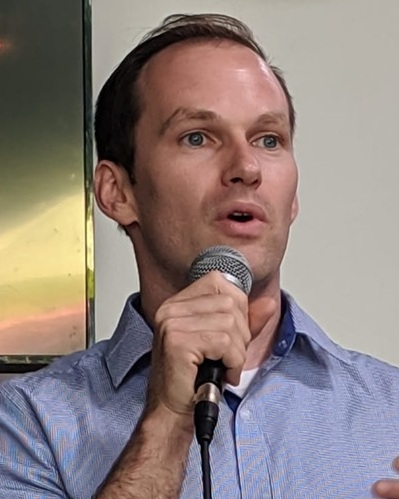

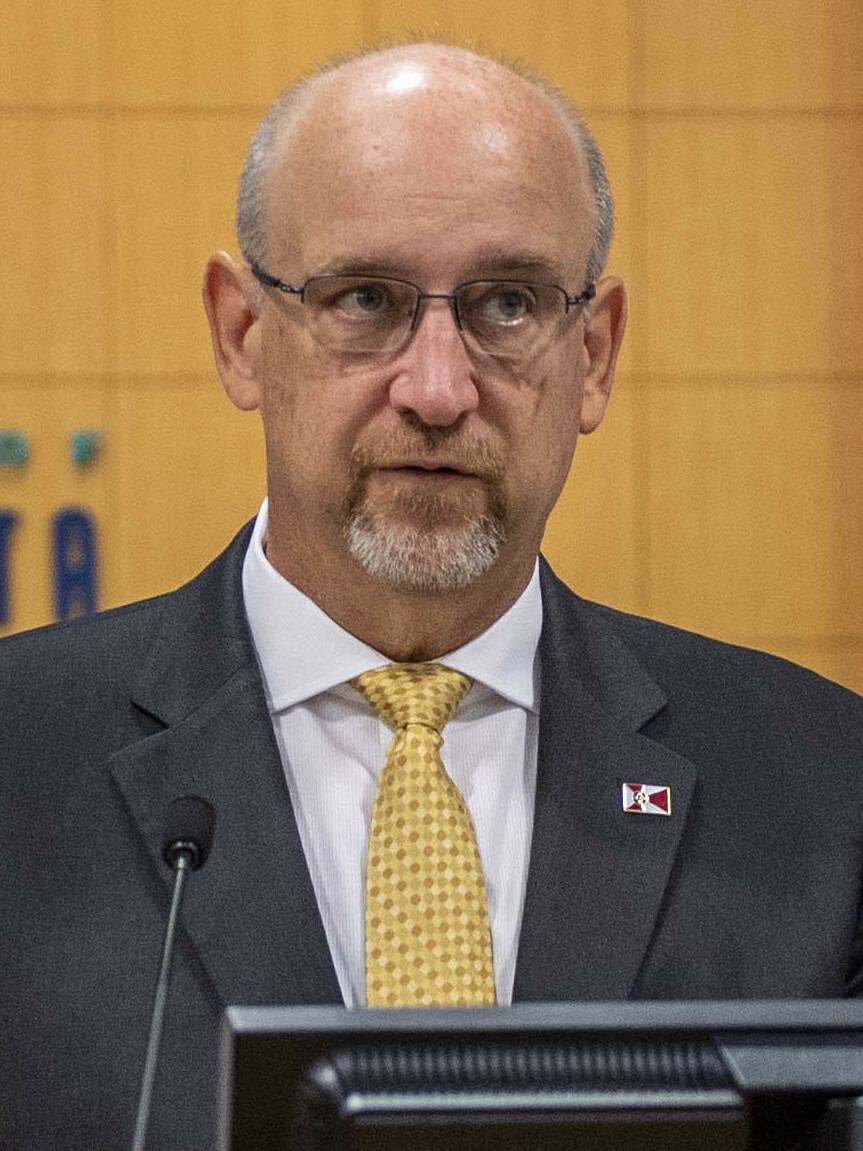

Nominee	Brandon Whipple	Jeff Longwell	Lyndy Wells (write-in)
Popular vote	22,256	17,516	8,426
Percentage	46.1%	36.3%	16.88%
Mayor before election
Jeff Longwell
Republican
Elected mayor
Brandon Whipple
Democratic

The 2019 Wichita mayoral election took place on November 5, 2019, to elect the mayor of Wichita, Kansas. The election is officially nonpartisan. Incumbent Jeff Longwell ran for reelection and faced Brandon Whipple in the runoff election. Whipple defeated Longwell, who conceded on election night.

== Primary campaign and election ==
In a contest with nine candidates, the three principal candidates who emerged were incumbent mayor Jeff Longwell, state representative Brandon Whipple, and businessman Lyndy Wells. While Longwell emphasized his track record, and plans for area development (particularly development of a new baseball stadium and team), Whipple and Wells focused on other issues, particularly the transparency in government, and promotion of local education development.

Whipple further prioritized "an underfunded police force. [because of] crime rising in our city." and proposed the involvement of mental health professionals in sensitive police conflict situations (a proposal similar to a program already in development at the Wichita Police Department). He also proposed re-instituting the Wichita Commission on Civil Rights, and a new "comprehensive non-discrimination ordinance expanding protections to include Military, Veterans, gender identity, gender expression, and sexual orientation."

In the 2019 city primary election, preliminary results put Whipple (with 5,729 votes; 25.9% of the total) second only to Mayor Longwell (who had 7,136 votes; 32.3%).

Candidate Lyndy Wells, however, had nearly the same number of primary votes as Whipple (only 160 votes fewer in initial returns: 5,569 votes; 25.2%), and initially delayed acceptance of the defeat in hopes that a review of 1,000 yet-uncounted ballots (including 500 provisional ballots) would turn the election to his favor. Accordingly, Whipple delayed a formal declaration of victory until the final canvass the following week. However, the final count nearly doubled Whipple's lead (6,067 votes over 5,770 for Wells; Longwell led with 7,404).

=== Results ===
Wichita Mayoral primary election, 2019
Party	Candidate	Votes	%
Nonpartisan	Jeff Longwell (incumbent)	7,409	32.1
Nonpartisan	Brandon Whipple	6,067	26.3
Nonpartisan	Lyndy Wells	5,770	25.0
Nonpartisan	Amy Lyon	1,470	6.4
Nonpartisan	Mark Gietzen	1,349	5.8
Nonpartisan	Brock Booker	457	2.0
Nonpartisan	Ian Demory	239	1.0
Nonpartisan	Joshua Atkinson	166	0.7
Nonpartisan	Marty Mork	144	0.6
Total votes		23,071	100.0

== Run-off campaign and general election ==
As the two top vote-getters, Whipple and Longwell were on the November 5 ballot as the two finalists for voters to choose between in the runoff in the city's 2019 general mayoral election. During the run-off campaign, Whipple gained endorsements from the unions representing the city's police and firefighters.

In late September, a heated controversy arose over Mayor Longwell's actions to steer the city's largest-ever contract – a $500-million contract to replace the city's water-treatment facility – away from the experienced out-of-state contractor recommended by an official study, and initially approved by the City Council – towards, instead, a less-experienced Wichita contractor who relied partly on project guidance from a firm implicated in the Flint water crisis. The local contractor was headed by one of the mayor's golfing partners, who had a lengthy personal relationship with the mayor, and who had given the mayor an unreported $1,000 gift.

Longwell argued that his efforts were not simply favoritism, but an attempt to bolster "keep money in the community", but the revelation aggravated questions of transparency in government that Whipple and Wells campaigned on. An investigation by the District Attorney declined to charge Longwell, but advised him to report gifts from the contractor.

In response to the controversy, Wichita restaurateur Jon Rolph, aided by former mayors (Republican Bob Knight and Democrat Carl Brewer), launched a $10,000 campaign to persuade third-place primary loser Lyndy Wells to resume his campaign as a write-in candidate, noting that Whipple lacked experience in city affairs. Whipple countered that he had "governing experience", and Wells did not. Whipple expressed anger at the move, calling it an attack upon his candidacy to actually get Longwell elected. In late October, Wells agreed to resume his campaign (as a write-in candidate).

In October 2019, Whipple found himself the victim of an elaborate, covert, multi-state defamatory campaign in which Republican state Representative Michael Capps was implicated. After the publication of the identities of those involved in the attacks, Sedgwick County Republican party chair Dalton Glasscock called for Capps to resign. Two days before the election, Capps claimed that Glasscock had actually approved the production of the ad, an allegation which Glasscock denied. Newly created anonymous entities also attacked both Whipple and Wells weighed via several mailers. Although the sending organizations used different names, they were all linked through a postal permit held by a Kansas City bulk-mail service. The funding of the salacious video as well as the anonymous mailers will not be required to be reported, according to the Kansas Governmental Ethics Commission. It has ruled outside organizations must report their identities and spending only if they use specific key terms such as "vote for," "elect," "vote against" or "defeat". The Democratic party was also criticized for publicly sending a mailer claiming that Longwell was being investigated by the District Attorney for "corruption". In fact, he had just been advised to report contributions and gifts received from the contractor to which a half-billion-dollar contract had been awarded. In October 2020, Whipple, represented by former U.S. Attorney Randy Rathburn, filed suit against Capps, Wichita City Councilman James Clendenin, and Sedgwick County Commissioner Michael O'Donnell, for defamation involving the false charges made against him in the 2019 mayoral election race. Allegations cited were that the co-conspirators tried to blame the conspiracy on Glasscock or Matthew Colburn, and that, with false accusations, they further intended to generate marital discord within Whipple's own family. The suit had originally been filed against the maker of the video, Colburn. It was dropped after Colburn provided audio, text messages, and other evidence, that had identified O'Donnell as the alleged leader of the conspiracy to defame Whipple, and who was accused for writing the script for the video frame-up, Whipple said that he felt sorry for the then-21-year-old Colburn who had been scapegoated by the perpetrators.

=== Results ===
On election day, November 5, 2019, Longwell conceded the election to Whipple, who won 46.43% of the ballots versus 36% for Longwell. The results were certified on November 15, 2019. Write-in candidate Lyndy Wells finished third with 16.88% of the total cast.

2019 Wichita mayoral runoff election results
Party	Candidate	Votes	%
Nonpartisan	Brandon Whipple	23,174	46.43%
Nonpartisan	John Longwell (incumbent)	17,969	36.00%
Write-in		8,767	17.57%
Total votes		49,910	100%
