= Carl Brewer =

Carl Brewer may refer to:

- Carl Brewer (ice hockey) (1938–2001), Canadian ice hockey defenceman
- Carl Brewer (politician) (1957–2020), former mayor of Wichita, Kansas
