= 2023 Wichita mayoral election =

- August 1 (primary); November 7, 2023 (general); Officially non-partisan
- Turnout: 15.93% (primary)
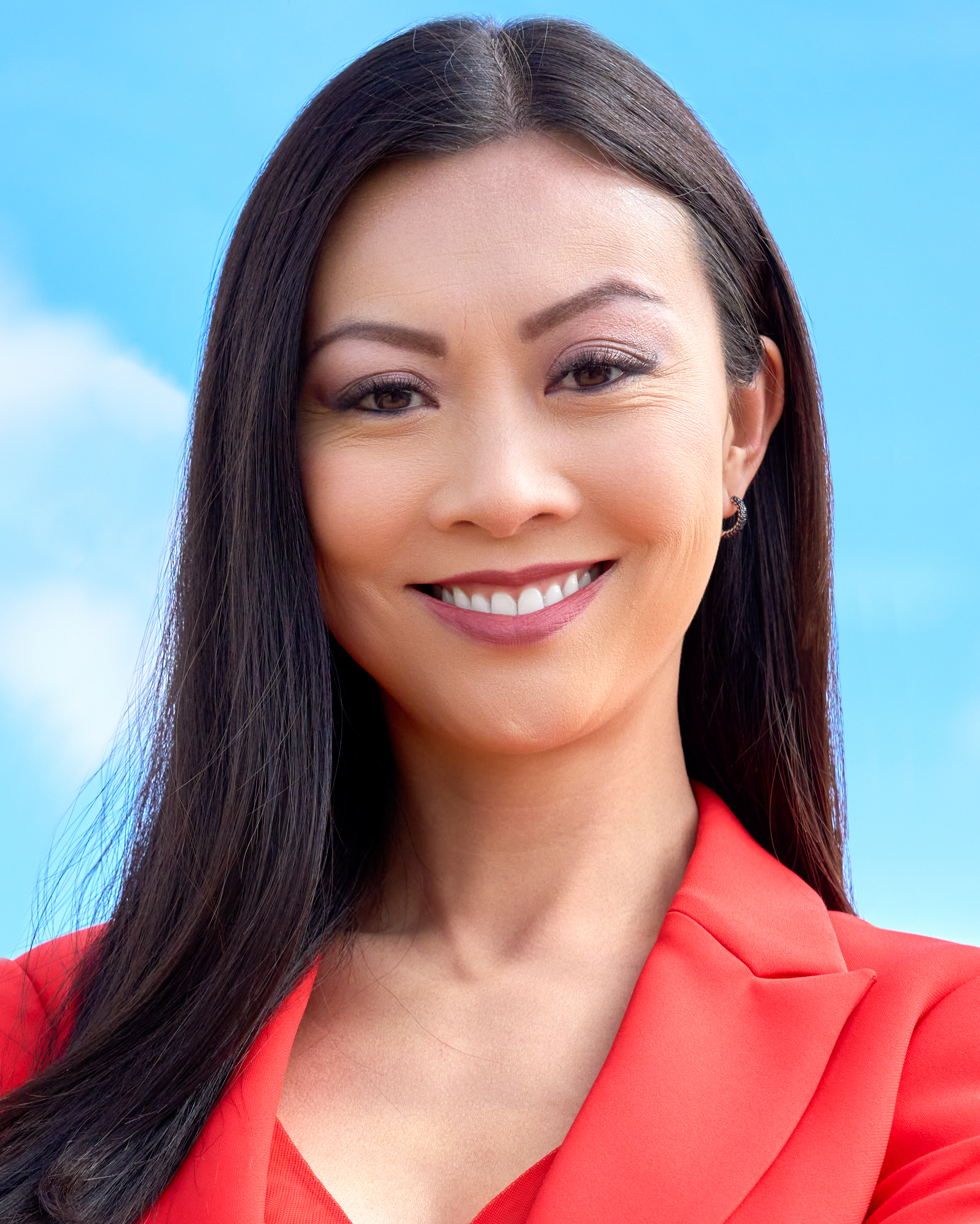

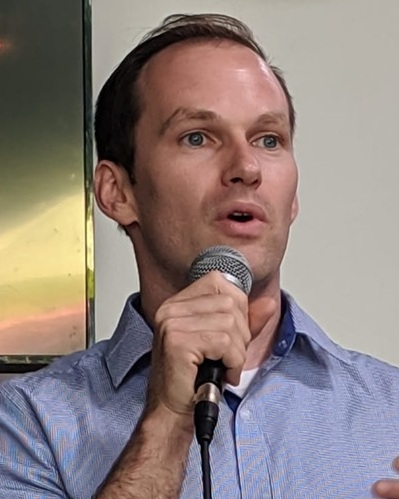
Candidate	Lily Wu	Brandon Whipple
Party	Nonpartisan	Nonpartisan
Alliance	Libertarian	Democratic
Popular vote	37,004	26,841
Percentage	57.22%	41.50%
- Wu 20–30% 30–40% 40–50% 50–60% 60–70% 70–80% 80–90% 90–100% Whipple 20–30% 30–40% 40–50% 50–60% 60–70% 70–80% 90–100% Frye 20–30% 30–40% 40–50% 90–100% Racette 20–30% 30–40% 40–50% 60–70% 90–100% Tie 20–30% 30–40% 40–50% 50% Not reported
Mayor before election
Brandon Whipple
Democratic
Elected mayor
Lily Wu
Libertarian

The 2023 Wichita mayoral election was held on November 7, 2023, to elect the mayor of Wichita, Kansas. The election is required to be non-partisan, but most candidates are known to be affiliated with political parties. Incumbent Democratic mayor Brandon Whipple unsuccessfully ran for re-election to a second term, losing to registered Libertarian candidate Lily Wu.

Former TV news anchor Wu finished first in the primary election, with Whipple narrowly defeating Republican city councilor Brian Frye to secure the second spot in the general election. Wu was backed by numerous prominent Republicans in the general election, including former U.S. Secretary of State Mike Pompeo, who was a U.S. Representative for KS-4, which encompasses Wichita. Despite Wu being a registered Libertarian, the Libertarian Party of Kansas declined to endorse Wu because of her being a registered Republican shortly before the election.

Without getting an endorsement from any political party, Wu pitched herself as a political outsider, while Whipple ran on his record. Wu defeated Whipple by a wide margin and became the first Asian-American and second female mayor in Wichita history.

== Primary election ==
=== Candidates ===
==== Advanced to general ====
- Brandon Whipple, incumbent mayor (registered Democrat)
- Lily Wu, former KWCH-DT news anchor (registered Libertarian)

==== Eliminated in primary ====
- Jared Cerullo, former city councilor (registered Republican)
- Bryan Frye, city councilor (registered Republican)
- Tom Kane
- Celeste Racette, community activist and former Federal Deposit Insurance Corporation investigator (registered independent)
- Julie Stroud, environmental health specialist (registered independent)

==== Withdrew ====
- Irving Freige, U.S. Navy veteran

==== Declined ====
- Jeff Blubaugh, city councilor (running for Sedgwick County commission, endorsed Frye)
- Pete Meitzner, chair of the Sedgwick County commission and former city councilor (endorsed Wu)

=== Endorsements ===
Brandon Whipple

County officials

- Lacey Cruse, former Sedgwick County Commissioner

Local officials

- Maggie Ballard, city councilmember
- Mike Hoheisel, city councilmember

Party chapters

- Sedgwick County Democratic Party

Labor unions

- International Association of Fire Fighters Local 135
- International Association of Machinists and Aerospace Workers Local 839
Lily Wu

County officials

- Pete Meitzner, chair of the Sedgwick County commission and former Wichita city councilor (Republican)
- Jeff Easter, Sedgwick County sheriff (Republican)

Local officials

- Robert G. Knight, former mayor (Republican)

Organizations

- Americans for Prosperity
- Wichita Regional Chamber PAC

Labor unions

- Wichita Fraternal Order of Police
Bryan Frye

Local officials

- Margalee Wright, former mayor (1983–1984)
- Elma Broadfoot, former mayor (1993–1995)
- Jeff Blubaugh, city councilor

Individuals

- Charles F. McAfee, architect and housing activist
Declined to endorse

Political parties

- Kansas Libertarian Party

=== Results ===
2023 Wichita mayoral primary election
Party	Candidate	Votes	%
Nonpartisan	Lily Wu	12,217	30.04%
Nonpartisan	Brandon Whipple (incumbent)	9,775	24.04%
Nonpartisan	Brian Frye	9,070	22.30%
Nonpartisan	Celeste Racette	6,831	16.80%
Nonpartisan	Jared Cerullo	1,870	4.60%
Nonpartisan	Sheila M. Davis	254	0.62%
Nonpartisan	Julie Rose Stroud	246	0.60%
Nonpartisan	Tom Kane	220	0.54%
Nonpartisan	Anthony Gallardo	182	0.45%
Total votes		40,665	100.00%

== General election ==
=== Post-primary endorsements ===
Lily Wu (Libertarian)
- Mike Pompeo, U.S. secretary of state (2018–2021), director of the Central Intelligence Agency (2017–2018), and U.S. representative from KS-04 (2011–2017) (Republican)

=== Results ===
2023 Wichita mayoral general election
Party	Candidate	Votes	%
Nonpartisan	Lily Wu	37,004	57.22%
Nonpartisan	Brandon Whipple (incumbent)	26,841	41.50%
Write-in		415	0.64%
Total votes		64,260	100.00%
