= 2015 Wichita mayoral election =

- March 3, 2015 (primary); April 7, 2015 (general)
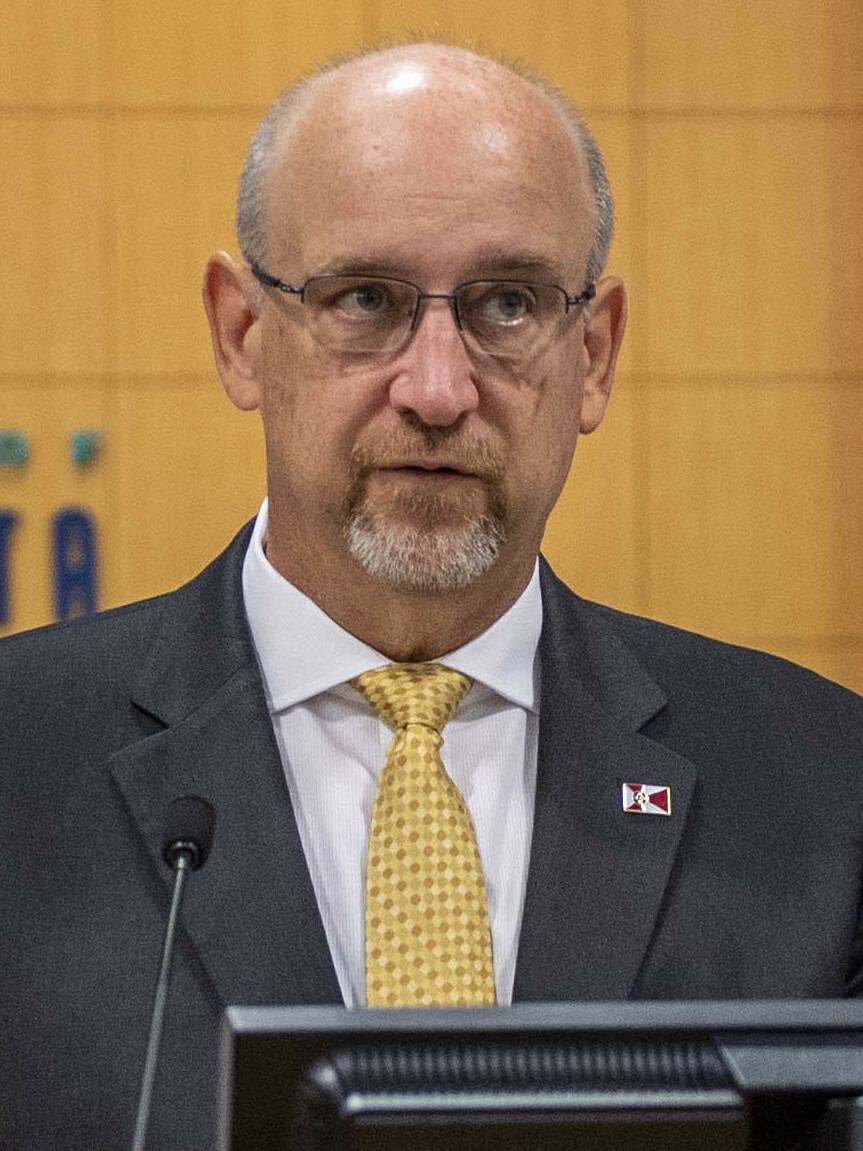

Nominee	Jeff Longwell	Sam Williams
Popular vote	22,292	13,478
Percentage	59.41%	35.92%
Mayor before election
Carl Brewer
Democratic
Elected mayor
Jeff Longwell
Republican

The 2015 Wichita mayoral election took place on April 7, 2015, to elect the mayor of Wichita, Kansas. The election was held concurrently with various other local elections, and is officially nonpartisan.

Incumbent mayor Carl Brewer, a Democrat, was term-limited and could not seek a third term in office.

A primary election was held on March 3, 2015, to decide the two candidates that moved on to the general election. City council member Jeff Longwell defeated retired business executive Sam Williams to become the next mayor.

== Primary election ==
=== Candidates ===
- Robert Culver, metal worker
- Sean Hatfield, attorney
- Dan Heflin, product engineer
- Frances Jackson, retired director
- Jeff Longwell, city council member for District 5
- Tony Rosales, businessman
- Tracy Stewart, banker
- Lavonta Williams, city council member for District 1
- Sam Williams, retired business executive and accountant
- Jennifer Winn, businesswoman and Republican candidate for governor in 2014

==== Declined ====
- Bob Knight, former mayor
- Norman Williams, former chief of the Wichita Police Department

=== Endorsements ===
Sean Hatfield
- Kansans for Life PAC
Sam Williams
- Bob Knight, former Mayor
- The Wichita Eagle

=== Results ===
Wichita mayoral primary election, 2015
Party	Candidate	Votes	%
Nonpartisan	Jeff Longwell	5,506	28.21
Nonpartisan	Sam Williams	5,000	25.62
Nonpartisan	Lavonta Williams	3,537	18.12
Nonpartisan	Jennifer Winn	2,094	10.73
Nonpartisan	Sean Hatfield	2,029	10.39
Nonpartisan	Dan Heflin	535	2.74
Nonpartisan	Frances Jackson	311	1.59
Nonpartisan	Tony Rosales	227	1.16
Nonpartisan	Tracy Stewart	147	0.75
Nonpartisan	Robert Culver	133	0.68
Total votes		19,519	100.00

== General election ==
=== Candidates ===
- Jeff Longwell, city council member for District 5
- Sam Williams, retired business executive and accountant

=== Polling ===
Poll source	Date(s) administered	Sample size	Margin of error	Jeff Longwell	Sam Williams	Undecided
SurveyUSA	March 18–23, 2015	501	± 4.5%	42%	35%	22%

=== Results ===
Wichita mayoral general election, 2015
Party	Candidate	Votes	%
Nonpartisan	Jeff Longwell	22,292	59.41
Nonpartisan	Sam Williams	13,478	35.92
Write-in		1,752	4.67
Total votes		37,522	100.00
