= Thomas Kessler =

Thomas Kessler may refer to:

- Thomas Kessler (footballer) (born 1986), German footballer
- Thomas Kessler (composer) (born 1937), Swiss composer
- Tommy Kessler, musician
- Tom Kessler, member of the Kansas House of Representatives
