= Edwin Bird Allen =

American politician

Kansas Secretary of State
- In office January 12, 1885 – January 14, 1889
- Preceded by: James Smith
- Succeeded by: William Higgins

Kansas House of Representatives
- In office 1883–1884

Kansas House of Representatives
- In office 1872–1876

Mayor of Wichita, Kansas
- In office 1871–1872
- Preceded by: None
- Succeeded by: James G. Hope

Personal details
- Born: March 7, 1836 Lorain County, Ohio
- Died: March 31, 1908 (aged 72) Buchanan County, Missouri
- Party: Republican

Edwin Bird Allen (March 7, 1836 - March 31, 1908) was an American politician who served as the Secretary of State of Kansas (1885–1889), as a representative in the Kansas House of Representatives (1883–1884 and 1872–1876), and as the first mayor of Wichita (1871–1872).

== Biography ==
Allen was born on March 7, 1836, in Lorain County, Ohio. He moved to Kansas in 1865. He trained as a physician and served a coroner from 1870 to 1871. He was one of 124 signers of the petition to incorporate Wichita. He served as the first Mayor of Wichita (1871–1872) and twice in the Kansas House of Representatives (1872–1876 and 1883–1884). He served as the Secretary of State of Kansas (1885–1889).

== Personal life ==
Allen died on March 31, 1908, in Buchanan County, Missouri. On May 25, 1857, he married Eliza Sewell; he later married Mary J. Garrison. He was the elder brother of Wichita mayor Joseph P. Allen who served as mayor from 1887 to 1888.
