= Phil Kerpen =

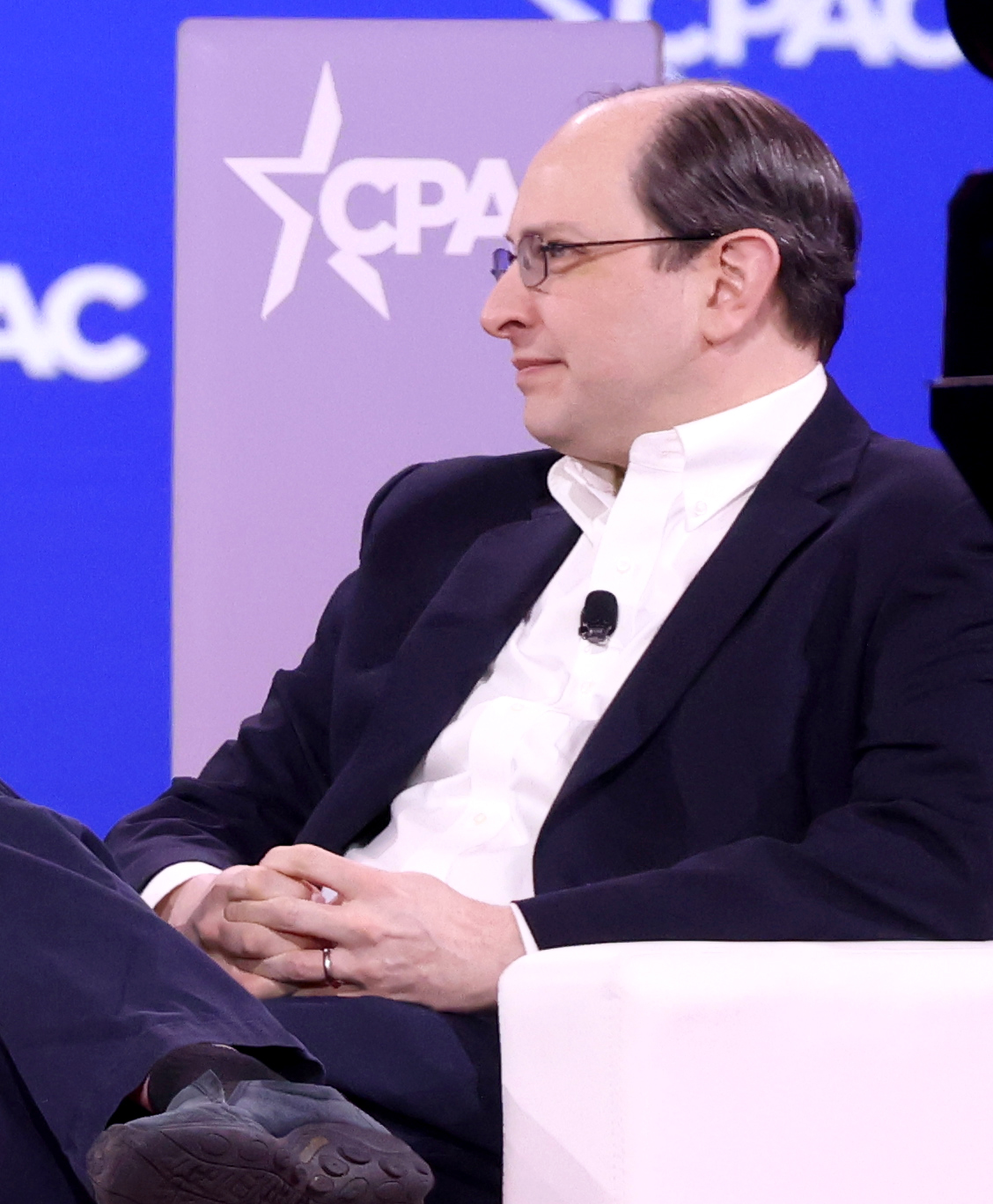
Kerpen at the 2025 Conservative Political Action Conference

Philip G. Kerpen is an American free-market policy analyst and political organizer. He is the president of American Commitment, a conservative 501(c)(4) organization which he founded in 2012. He previously served for over five years as the vice president of Americans for Prosperity.

== Career ==
=== Policy analysis and debate ===
Kerpen began his career in 1999 as an intern at the Cato Institute, because he “became disillusioned with insularity of academic debate” while attending the University of Pittsburgh.

Kerpen was a policy analyst for the Club for Growth. Until June 23, 2006, he was Policy Director for the Free Enterprise Fund, a United States free market advocacy group. Kerpen was the vice president of Americans for Prosperity for more than five years, ending his tenure there in April 2012. Kerpen is a syndicated columnist and a frequent radio and television commentator on economic growth issues. Kerpen is president of American Commitment, a conservative 501(c)(4) organization which he founded in 2012.

=== Works ===
In 2011, Kerpen wrote a book entitled Democracy Denied: How Obama is Ignoring You and Bypassing Congress to Radically Transform America – and How to Stop Him.

== Personal ==
A native of Brooklyn, Kerpen attended Stuyvesant High School. He lives in Washington, D.C., with his wife Joanna and their four children. His brother is social media entrepreneur Dave Kerpen.
