= Libertarian Party of Kansas =

State affiliate of the Libertarian Party

- Chairperson: Tim Giblin
- Secretary: Eric Lund
- Founded: December 1971
- Membership (2021): 21,297
- Ideology: Libertarianism; Non-interventionism; Fiscal conservatism Economic liberalism Cultural liberalism Laissez-faire
- National affiliation: Libertarian Party
- Colors: Gold, Blue
- U.S. Senate: 0 / 2
- U.S. House: 0 / 4
- Statewides: 0 / 6
- State Senate: 0 / 40
- State House: 0 / 125
- Other elected officials: 2 (June 2024)

Website
- www.lpks.org

The Libertarian Party of Kansas (LPKS) is the Kansas affiliate of the Libertarian Party. The LPKS earned full ballot access in 1992 as a minor party, with Libertarian candidates appearing on every statewide general election ballot since then. This kind of ballot access has long been considered a core goal for Libertarian Party state-level affiliates.

Since 2010 the party has pursued major party status which would give them the same primary ballot access enjoyed by the Republican and Democratic parties. To achieve major party status, their candidate for Governor of Kansas, needs to receive 5% or more of the statewide vote in the general election, but failed to do so in past elections.

The Libertarian Party of Kansas has advocated for protection of the 2nd amendment.

In 2023, Libertarian Lily Wu was elected mayor of Wichita, the largest city in Kansas, in an officially non-partisan election. This was considered an exceptional victory at the time.

In 2017 it had been growing faster than other parties for a decade, and continued steady growth until 2022 before plateauing.

== See also ==
- List of state Libertarian Parties in the United States
