= Stephanie Yeager =

American politician

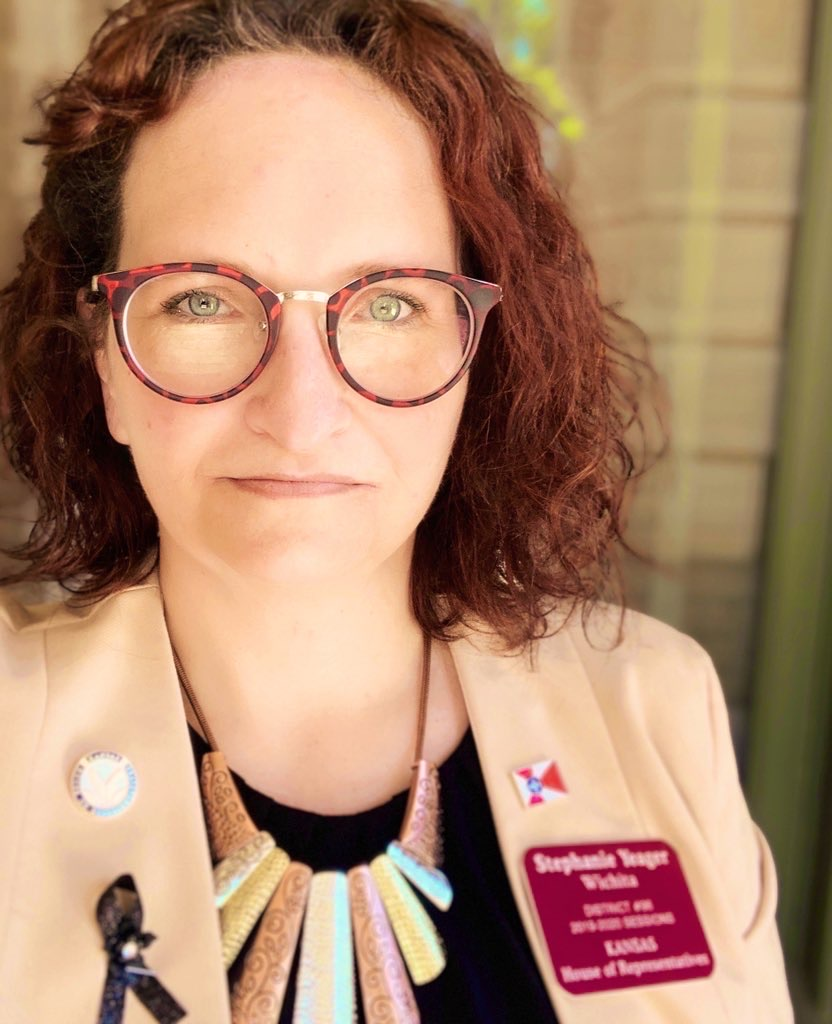

Member of the Kansas House of Representatives from the 96th district
- In office January 14, 2020 – January 11, 2021
- Preceded by: Brandon Whipple
- Succeeded by: Tom Kessler

Personal details
- Party: Democratic

Stephanie Yeager is an American politician and a former member of the Kansas House of Representatives, representing the 96th district. She was selected by Democratic Party precinct committee members in Sedgwick County on December 4, 2019, to succeed Democrat Brandon Whipple, who resigned on January 13, 2020, to be sworn-in as mayor of Wichita. Yeager was sworn in as a state representative on January 14, following a formal appointment by Governor Laura Kelly.

2019–2020 Kansas House of Representatives Committee assignments

- Education
- Elections

Kansas House of Representatives
Preceded by Brandon Whipple	Member of the Kansas House of Representatives from the 96th district 2020–2021	Succeeded by Tom Kessler
