= Lily Wu =

American politician (born 1984)

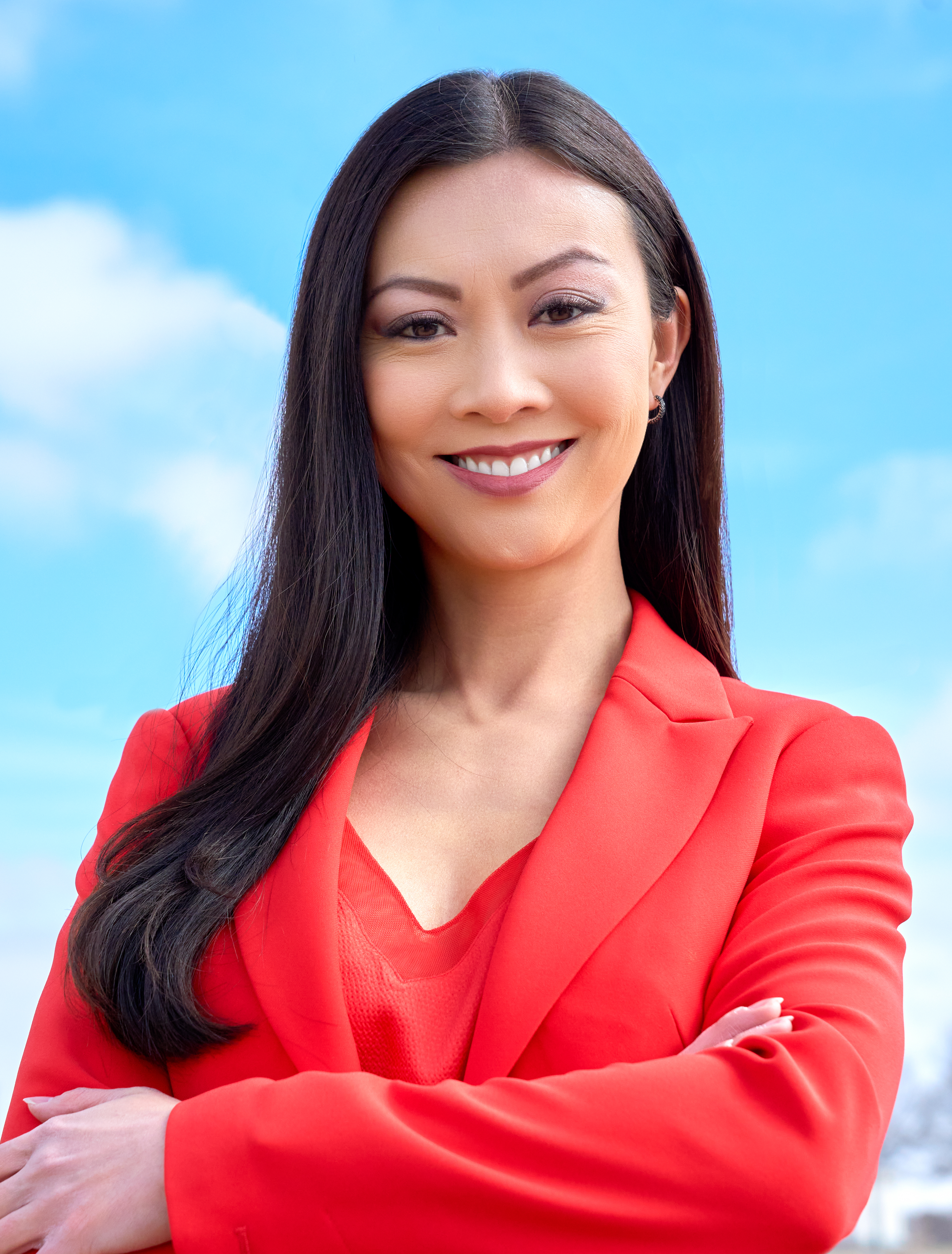

103rd Mayor of Wichita
- Incumbent
- Assumed office January 8, 2024
- Preceded by: Brandon Whipple

Personal details
- Born: September 4, 1984 (age 42) Antigua Guatemala, Guatemala
- Party: Libertarian (2022–present)
- Other political affiliations: Republican (before 2022)
- Education: Wichita State University (BA); University of Hong Kong (MA)

Lily Wu (born September 4, 1984) is an American politician and former television news anchor, serving as the 103rd mayor of Wichita, Kansas, since 2024. A member of the Libertarian Party, she is the first Asian American mayor in Kansas, the first woman elected to a full term as mayor of Wichita, and the only Libertarian mayor of one of the 100 largest cities in the United States.

== Early life and education ==
Wu was born in Antigua, Guatemala, in 1984 to Chinese immigrant parents. The family moved to Wichita, Kansas, United States in 1993. Wu graduated from the International Baccalaureate program at Wichita East High School, earned her bachelor's degree in international business and integrated marketing communication from Wichita State University, and a master's degree in journalism from the University of Hong Kong.

== Career ==
=== News career ===
Wu joined the news department at KAKE in Wichita as a reporter in 2010. She hosted their morning show from August 2014 to September 2016. She left KAKE in December 2019, and joined KWCH-DT as an anchor and reporter in June 2020. She resigned her position in March 2023 in order to run for mayor.

=== Political career ===
Wu attended the Charles Koch Institute and completed a one-year associate program. She was previously a member of the Republican Party but later switched her voter registration to the Libertarian Party in 2022.

== Mayor of Wichita ==
In April 2023, Wu announced her candidacy in the 2023 non-partisan election for mayor of Wichita. She was endorsed by the Koch brothers' organization Americans for Prosperity (AFP), the Wichita Regional Chamber PAC, the Wichita Fraternal Order of Police, and former U.S. Secretary of State Mike Pompeo. Wu raised $440,000, a record amount and number of contributors, and AFP spent an additional $192,000 on her behalf.

Wu finished the primary election in first place and advanced to a runoff election with incumbent mayor Brandon Whipple. She defeated Whipple in the general election, 58% to 42% making her the first Asian American mayor in Kansas and the first woman elected to a full term as mayor of Wichita. Newsweek called her win the Libertarian Party's "Biggest Ever Election Win", though the state affiliate Libertarian Party of Kansas released a statement saying she is a, "registered libertarian, but not a recognized candidate."

=== Tenure ===
Wu was sworn into office on January 8, 2024, in a ceremony at Wichita City Hall. In her first year, in addition to increasing salaries and equipment for police, many of Wu's efforts were aimed at increased transparency, such as spending Mondays with local news to better inform the public, instituting rules for reporting gifts, more clarity on council member travel, and adding opportunities for the public to attend and speak at city council meetings. However, several of her plans were stopped by the city council.

== Elections ==
Wichita mayoral election, 2023
Primary election
Party	Candidate	Votes	%
Nonpartisan	Lily Wu	12,217	30.0
Nonpartisan	Brandon Whipple (incumbent)	9,775	24.0
Nonpartisan	Bryan Frye	9,070	22.3
Nonpartisan	Celeste Racette	6,831	16.8
Nonpartisan	Jared Cerullo	1,870	4.6
Nonpartisan	Shelia M Davis ("Rainman")	254	0.6
Nonpartisan	Julie Rose Stroud	246	0.6
Nonpartisan	Tom Kane	220	0.6
Nonpartisan	Anthony Gallardo	182	0.4
Total votes		40,665	100.0
General election
Nonpartisan	Lily Wu	37,004	57.6
Nonpartisan	Brandon Whipple (incumbent)	26,841	41.8
Nonpartisan	Write-in	415	0.6
Total votes		64,260	100.0

== See also ==
- List of American libertarians

Political offices
Preceded by Brandon Whipple	Mayor of Wichita; 2024–present	Incumbent
