= Jeff Longwell =

Mayor of Wichita, Kansas, United States

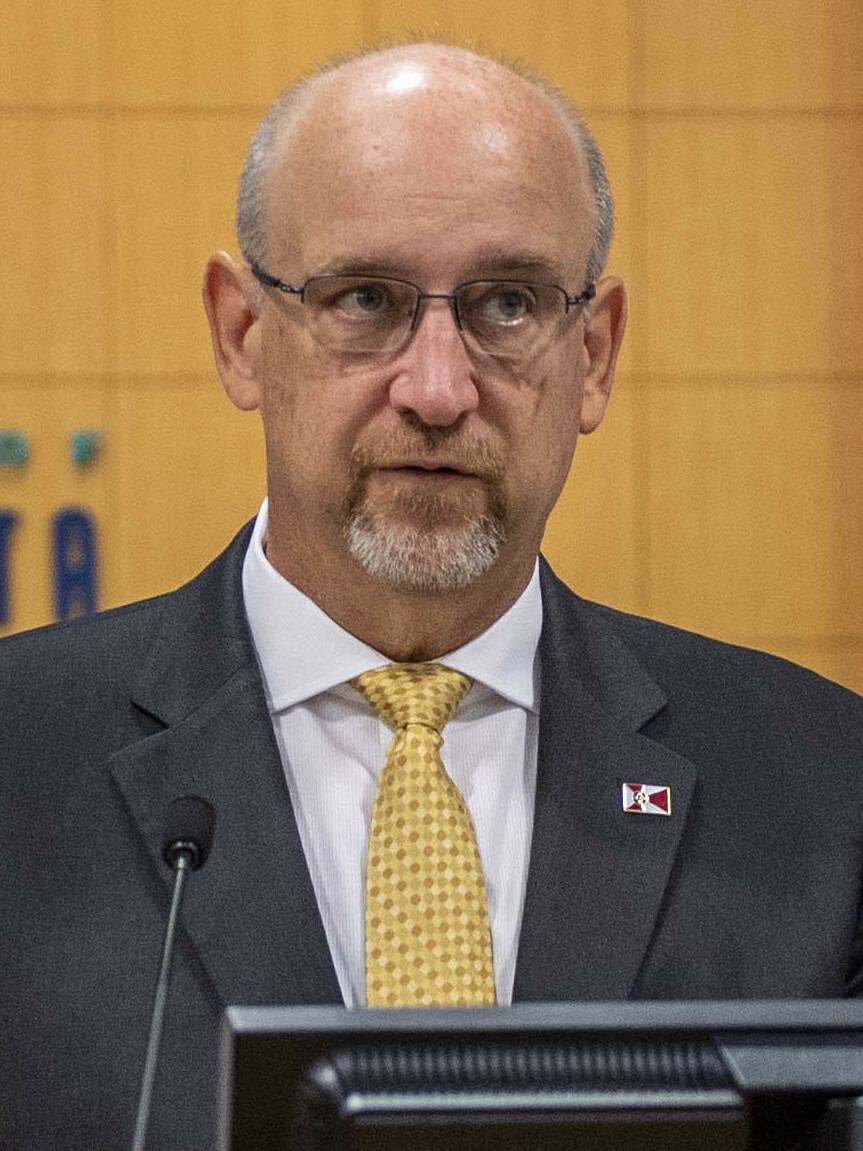

101st Mayor of Wichita
- In office April 13, 2015 – January 13, 2020
- Preceded by: Carl Brewer
- Succeeded by: Brandon Whipple

Personal details
- Born: June 15, 1960 (age 66)
- Party: Republican
- Spouse: Susie (m. 1980)
- Children: 3
- Education: Wichita State University
- Website: Government website

Jeff Longwell (born June 15, 1960) is an American politician and businessman. He served as the 101st mayor of Wichita, Kansas from 2015 to 2020. Prior to his election as mayor, Longwell served eight years on the Wichita city council and twelve years on the Maize school board.

== Career ==
Longwell was elected mayor of Wichita in the 2015 mayoral election. In 2019, Longwell was accused of steering an over $500 million new drinking water facility project to his golfing friends. Via email, Longwell had communicated with contractors of his friends' business saying, "I'm going to be super nice to you for a long time."

Running for reelection in 2019, Longwell gathered 32.1% of ballots cast in a low-turnout election. Kansas state Representative Brandon Whipple received 26.3% in a nine-person field, advancing the two to a runoff to be held on November 5.

On election day, November 5, 2019, Longwell conceded the election to Whipple, who won 46% of the ballots versus 36% for Longwell, with the remainder cast for write-in candidates which remained to be counted. The results were certified on November 15, 2019. Following his defeat, Longwell indicated he was not going to run for office in the future.

== See also ==
- 2015 Wichita mayoral election
- 2019 Wichita mayoral election

Political offices
Preceded by Carl Brewer	Mayor of Wichita; 2015–2020	Succeeded by Brandon Whipple
