= Mario Goico =

American politician

Member of the Kansas House of Representatives from the 94th district
- In office January 14, 2013 – January 9, 2017
- Preceded by: Joe McLeland
- Succeeded by: Leo Delperdang

Member of the Kansas House of Representatives from the 100th district
- In office January 13, 2003 – January 14, 2013
- Preceded by: Carlos Mayans
- Succeeded by: Daniel Hawkins

Personal details
- Born: July 24, 1945 (age 80) Cuba
- Party: Republican
- Spouse: Susan
- Education: Wichita State University

Mario Goico (born July 24, 1945) is a former Republican member of the Kansas House of Representatives who represented Wichita, Kansas.

Goico represented the 100th district from 2003 to 2013, and the 94th district from 2013 to 2017. Goico was first elected in 2002 but did not run for reelection in 2016. He had no primary or general election opposition in 2010–2014. He served as the assistant majority leader in 2015–2017. He had a lifetime rating of 88% from the American Conservative Union.

An aeronautical engineer, Goico is married to Susan Goico and is a native of Cuba.

== Committee membership ==
- Taxation
- Vision 2020
- Veterans, Military and Homeland Security (Vice-Chair)
- Financial Institutions
- Local Government
- Joint Committee on Kansas Security (Chair)

== Major donors ==
The top 5 donors to Goico's 2008 campaign:

- 1. Astrazeneca $1,000
- 2. Kansas Medical Society $750
- 3. HSBC North America $550
- 4. Kansas Chamber of Commerce & Industry $500
- 5. Sunflower Electric Power Corp $500
