= Tim Phillips (political strategist) =

American political strategist

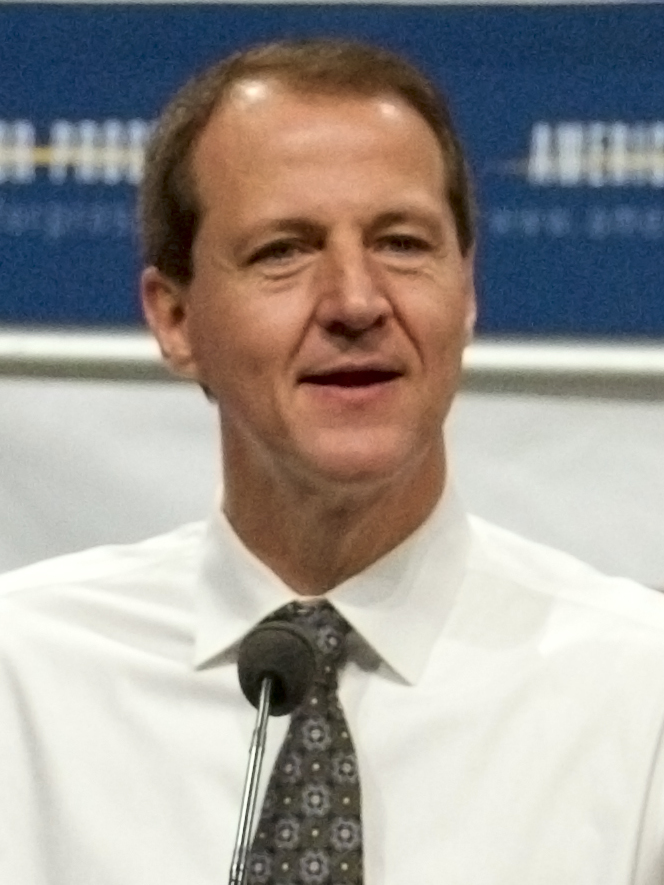
- Phillips in 2011
- Born: July 13, 1964 (age 61)
- Education: Liberty University; Virginia Tech (BA)
- Occupations: Former president, Americans for Prosperity

Timothy A. Phillips (born July 13, 1964) or Tim Phillips is the former president of Americans for Prosperity (AFP) from 2006 through November 2021. He was an early Tea Party movement organizer. Prior to joining AFP, Phillips was a Republican campaign strategist.

== Personal life ==
Phillips grew up in Spartanburg, South Carolina. After briefly attending Liberty University in 1983, he went to Washington D.C. as part of a school sponsored internship with the United States Department of Education. There he met fellow intern Julia Reider Phillips, whom he later married. The couple have four children, including son Cabot Phillips.

Phillips completed his education in 1985 as a Phi Beta Kappa graduate of Virginia Tech, graduating magna cum laude with a B.A. in political science.

== Career ==
Phillips was chief of staff to United States House of Representatives member Bob Goodlatte of Virginia. Phillips co-founded political consulting firm Century Strategies with political strategist Ralph Reed.

In 2005, Phillips was hired to lead Americans for Prosperity, a conservative political advocacy group active in building the Tea Party movement.
