= Don Enoch =

American politician and businessman

Mayor of Wichita, Kansas
- In office 1969–1970
- Preceded by: William D. Anderson, Jr.
- Succeeded by: A. Price Woodard, Jr.

Personal details
- Born: June 22, 1916 Neosho, Missouri
- Died: June 24, 2010 (aged 94)
- Profession: Businessman, politician

Donald Kirk Enoch (June 22, 1916 – June 24, 2010) was an American politician who served as the Mayor of Wichita, Kansas, from 1969 until 1970. Enoch also served as Wichita's City Commissioner for three separate terms: (1967–1968, 1968–1969, 1970–1971). He is credited as one of the key people who established the Wichita River Festival.

== Biography ==
=== Early life ===
Enoch was born on June 22, 1916, in Neosho, Missouri. He moved to Wichita with his family when he was an elementary school student. Enoch graduated from Wichita North High School. He received a bachelor's degree in music from the University of Wichita (now called Wichita State University), graduating magna cum laude.

Enoch began his career as a band director at Atwood High School during the late 1930s. The school's band won Kansas and national awards. Enoch left his teaching position to enlist in the United States Army Air Corps at the beginning of World War II. He worked as an aircraft instructor and test pilot in the Air Corps during the war.

He left the Army Air Corp following the end of World War II. Enoch moved back to Wichita and acquired the Wichita Brush Company, his family's business. The company, which would later be renamed the Wichita Brush and Chemical Company, became a maintenance and cleaning supply business under Enoch. By the 1960s, Enoch had all of his company's chemicals into biodegradable products, including the cleaning solutions, soaps and waxes.

=== Politics ===
Enoch was first elected to the Wichita City Commission in 1967. Enoch soon developed an idea to hold a parade and festival along the city's Arkansas River waterfront to celebrate Wichita's centennial. Enoch, who became Wichita's 61st mayor in 1969, oversaw the Centennial of Progress Pageant, which evolved into the annual Wichita River Festival. Enoch envisioned the Wichita River Festival as a vehicle for potential urban renewal and economic growth for the city.

Don Enoch died on June 24, 2010, two days after his 94th birthday. He was survived by his wife of 54 years, Margery Trively; three sons – Craig T. Enoch, a retired Texas Supreme Court justice, Dr. Rolland Enoch and Mark Enoch and one daughter – Dawn Moore; 10 grandchildren and one great-grandchild.
