= Jessica Maldonado =

American politician

Jessica Maldonaldo

Member-elect of the Kansas House of Representatives from the 96th district
- Assuming office January 2027
- Succeeding: Tom Kessler

Personal details
- Party: Democratic

Jessica Maldonaldo is an American politician. A member of the Democratic Party, she is the member-elect for the 96th district of the Kansas House of Representatives.
