= Joe McLeland =

American politician

Member of the Kansas House of Representatives from the 94th district
- In office January 8, 2001 – January 14, 2013
- Preceded by: David P. Gregory
- Succeeded by: Mario Goico

Personal details
- Born: July 27, 1946 (age 79)
- Party: Republican
- Spouse: Jennifer
- Children: 3
- Education: Fort Hays State University

Joe McLeland (born July 27, 1946) is a former Republican member of the Kansas House of Representatives, representing the 94th district. He served from 2001 to 2013. In 2010, the Kansas Chapter of Americans for Prosperity gave him a freedom index score of 72%. In 2010, it gave him a 100% evaluation on conservative issues.

McLeland, who has his BS in Mathematics from Fort Hays State University, has worked as a computer network analyst.

He has been involved with the Catholic Family Federal Credit Union, Family Consultation Service, Kansas Research and Education Network, and the Knights of Columbus Council 4118.

== Committee membership ==
- Appropriations
- Higher Education
- Education Budget (Chair)
- Joint Committee on Information Technology (Chair)

== Major donors ==
The top 5 donors to McLeland's 2008 campaign:

- 1. Koch Industries $800
- 2. Prairie Band Potawatomi Nation $750
- 3. Kansas Medical Society $500
- 4. Kansas Contractors Assoc $500
- 5. Kansas Optometric Assoc $500
