= William Greiffenstein =

American politician

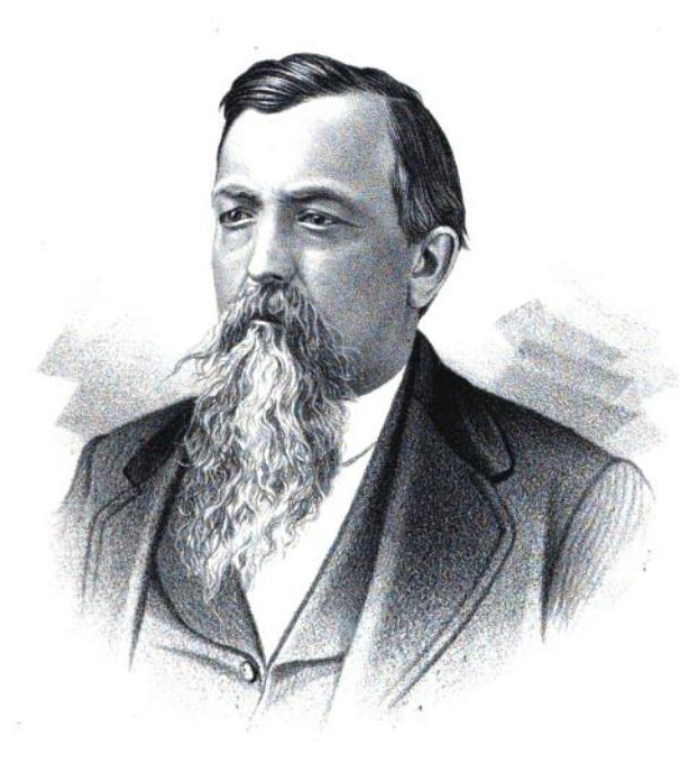

Mayor of Wichita
- In office 1879–1884
- Preceded by: Sol H. Kohn
- Succeeded by: Benajah W. Aldrich
- In office 1878
- Preceded by: James G. Hope
- Succeeded by: Sol H. Kohn

Personal details
- Born: July 28, 1829; Free City of Frankfurt
- Died: September 26, 1899 (aged 63); Burnett, Oklahoma Territory
- Political party: Democratic

William Greiffenstein (July 28, 1829 - September 26, 1899) was a German American pioneer and trader who served as the Mayor of Wichita, Kansas in 1878 and again from 1879 to 1884.

== Biography ==
Greiffenstein was born on July 28, 1829, in the Free City of Frankfurt. He first settled in St. Louis, Missouri and worked as a clerk in his uncle's store. In the 1850s, Greiffenstein moved to Kansas Territory, where he established trading posts to trade with the Native Americans in neighboring Indian Territory. Greiffenstein and his wife were instrumental in rescuing white captives from a number of tribes. In 1870, he helped found the city of Wichita, and twice served as its mayor. Greiffenstein later moved to Oklahoma Territory, where he founded the town of Burnett in Pottawatomie County, which is no longer inhabited. He died in Burnett in 1899.
