= Russell Jump =

American politician

Frank Russell Jump
- Russell Jump during his tenure as mayor

Mayor of Wichita
- In office 1952–1953
- Preceded by: Floyd Throckmorton Amsden
- Succeeded by: Walter M. Keeler

Personal details
- Born: March 16, 1895 Galesburg, Illinois, U.S.
- Died: April 18, 2000 (aged 105) Pratt, Kansas, U.S.
- Spouse: Florence M. Regnier (m. 1918; died 1999)
- Children: 1
- Education: University of California, Berkeley
- Occupation: Founder of Arotext Co.

Frank Russell Jump (March 16, 1895 – April 18, 2000) was Mayor of Wichita, Kansas, serving from 1952 to 1953. Born in Illinois, Jump's family moved to Kansas, the state where he would spend most of his life, when he was a child. After briefly attending Kansas State University, Jump decided to join the war effort and graduated from the University of California, Berkeley's School of Military Aeronautics. Although he never flew any combat missions, aviation would become a significant part of the rest of his life.

After marrying and returning to Kansas, Jump started a uniform manufacturing company with his wife Florence, and had a daughter, Marjorie. He served as city commissioner of Wichita, Kansas for several years, before becoming the city's mayor. During his brief stint, his most noted achievement was the sale of the city's airport to the United States Air Force, which later became McConnell Air Force Base. After his one-year term as mayor, Jump retired from politics and continued operating his company until the 1960s. At the time of his death, he was recognized as one of the longest lived individuals ever to have held public office.

== Early life ==
Jump was born on March 16, 1895, to Frank and Mary Alice Durbin Jump in Galesburg, Illinois, a city in Knox County, and was a Methodist his entire life. His family moved to Anthony, Kansas, in 1902 when he was 7 years old, and at the onset of the first World War I, he was attending Kansas State University. Wanting to join the war effort, Jump headed to California.

Jump signed up to serve during World War I, enlisting on December 22, 1917. He finished his studies at the University of California, Berkeley's School of Military Aeronautics, graduating on July 8, 1918, and proceeded to train for the war effort. He was among the first flight class to train at March Air Reserve Base in Riverside, California. Jump was prepared to serve as an Army Air Corps pilot, having received his Reserve Military Aviator rating, but the war ended before he was able to engage in any dogfights against Germany. On November 2, 1918, days before the armistice, he had been made a Second Lieutenant. He was able, however, to fly over Los Angeles for a war bond drive in 1918, along with classmate and future aviation pioneer Walter Varney. Afterwards, Jump spent two months as an instructor at the base, before being discharged on January 4, 1919.

Several weeks after the armistice, on November 28, 1918, Jump married Florence Regnier. He had met Reginer on a blind date at 19 years old when she was 16. After his military career, in 1921, he and his wife returned to Kansas, and settled in Wichita, where they had a daughter, Marjorie. In 1924, the couple formed a uniform manufacturing company, Arotex Co.

== Political career ==
Jump served as city commissioner of Wichita from 1949 until 1952, when he became mayor, succeeding Floyd Throckmorton Amsden. During his time in political office, which lasted through 1953, he was instrumental in negotiating the sale of the local airport to the United States Air Force. Upon acquiring the city's airport in 1951, the Air Force converted it into McConnell Air Force Base. He also helped the city expand as mayor, overseeing a bond issue that would help future development by funding water and sewer extensions. He was succeeded as mayor by Walter M. Keeler

== Later life ==
Jump retired from politics after his tenure as mayor and he and his wife continued to operate their business until the 1960s. He was a member of the Order of Daedalians, an organization for former military pilots, until his death. The Jumps had celebrated their 80th wedding anniversary in 1998 Russell was 103, Florence was 100. Jump died on April 18, 2000, a month and 2 days after his 105th birthday in Pratt, Kansas, his wife having died four months prior at 101, 18 days after their 81st wedding anniversary. At the time of his death, he had two grandsons, five great-grandchildren, and one great-great grandson, and was recognized as one of the longest lived people to have ever held public office.

Preceded by Floyd Throckmorton Amsden	Mayor of Wichita, Kansas; 1952 – 1953	Succeeded by Walter M. Keeler
