= Americans for Prosperity =

Libertarian conservative political advocacy group

Coordinates: 38.8918°N 77.0854°W

- Predecessor: Citizens for a Sound Economy
- Formation: March 10, 2004; 22 years ago
- Type: Nonprofit political advocacy group
- Tax ID no.: 75-3148958
- Legal status: 501(c)(4)
- Headquarters: Arlington County, Virginia, U.S.
- Members: 2.3 million (2013)
- President/CEO: Emily Seidel
- Board chair: Mark Holden
- Affiliations: Americans for Prosperity Foundation, PDIST LLC
- Revenue: 223,706,334 USD (2024)
- Expenses: 201,414,745 USD (2024)
- Website: americansforprosperity.org

Americans for Prosperity (AFP), founded in 2004, is a libertarian conservative political advocacy group in the United States affiliated with brothers Charles Koch and the late David Koch. As the Koch brothers' primary political advocacy group, it has been viewed as one of the most influential American conservative organizations.

After the 2009 inauguration of President Barack Obama, AFP helped transform the Tea Party movement into a political force. It organized significant opposition to Obama administration initiatives such as global warming regulation, the Patient Protection and Affordable Care Act, the expansion of Medicaid, and economic stimulus. It helped turn back cap and trade, the major environmental proposal of Obama's first term. AFP advocated for limits on the collective bargaining rights of public-sector trade unions and for right-to-work laws and opposed raising the federal minimum wage. AFP played an active role in achieving the Republican majority in the House of Representatives in 2010 and in the Senate in 2014.

In the 2014 midterm election cycle, AFP led all groups other than political action committees (PACs) in spending on political television advertising. AFP's scope of operations has drawn comparisons to political parties. AFP, an educational social welfare organization, and the associated Americans for Prosperity Foundation, a public charity, are tax-exempt nonprofits. As a tax-exempt nonprofit, AFP is not legally required to disclose its donors to the general public; the extent of its political activities while operating as a tax-exempt entity has raised concerns among some campaign finance watchdogs as to the transparency of its funding.

== Background, founding, and growth ==
Americans for Prosperity was founded in 2004 when internal rivalries caused a split in the conservative political advocacy group Citizens for a Sound Economy (CSE), creating Americans for Prosperity and FreedomWorks. AFP's founding was funded by businessmen and philanthropist brothers David H. Koch and Charles Koch, of Koch Industries. The Americans for Prosperity Foundation is the Koch brothers' primary political advocacy group. According to a spokesperson from Koch Industries, the Koch companies do not direct the activities of AFP.

AFP's original stated mission was "educating citizens about economic policy and mobilizing citizens as advocates in the public policy process". Its current stated mission is "to mobilize citizens to advocate for policies that cut red tape and increase opportunity, put the brakes on government overspending, and get the economy working for hard workers – not special interests". It is focused on "fiscal responsibility," and in particular on cutting taxes, reducing regulation of business, and limiting the power of the courts. According to FactCheck.org, "AFP seeks to support free markets and entrepreneurship by advocating lower taxes and limited government spending and regulation." Its leaders view the organization as a counterbalance to the progressive movement's unions and activist organizations. According to NBC News, The New York Times and others, some of AFP's policy positions align with the business interests of the Koch brothers and Koch Industries, including its support for rescinding energy regulations and environmental restrictions; expanding domestic energy production; lowering taxes; and reducing government spending, especially Social Security, Medicare, and Medicaid.

From 2004 to 2007, AFP was led by Nancy Pfotenhauer. In 2005, the Kochs hired political strategist Tim Phillips to work at AFP.

AFP had a staff of 116 employees in September 2012, and the next year it had chapters in 34 states and reported a membership of 2.3 million. In June 2014, it had 240 employees in 32 states. AFP has been active in national, state, and local elections. AFP registered to lobby in 2014. According to FactCheck.org, by 2011, AFP had "emerged as one of the most influential conservative issue advocacy groups on the national and state political scene". The Los Angeles Times said AFP performed roles typical of national and state political parties. ABC News said in August 2014 that AFP was "poised to be the most influential conservative group in the nation this year, and among the most influential and heaviest spending across the political spectrum this year and into the looming presidential race".

As of mid-September 2018, AFP has become one of just 15 groups that account for three-quarters of the anonymous cash following the 2010 Supreme Court decision Citizens United v. FEC, which paved the way for dark money to flow into U.S. elections.

In 2023 in Wyoming, Tyler Lindholm formed the 36th state chapter of Americans for Prosperity.

== Leadership, structure and funding ==
Tim Phillips was the president of AFP and the AFP Foundation from 2006 to 2021, when he was forced to resign.

AFP has been called both the political and educational arm of the AFP Foundation. AFP and the AFP Foundation share offices and staff.

=== AFP ===
As of 2014, New Jersey businesswoman Frayda Levin chaired the board of directors of AFP. Other directors include Pfotenhauer, former U.S. government official and economist James C. Miller III, James E. Stephenson, and Mark Holden. AFP files with the Internal Revenue Service (IRS) as a 501(c)(4) nonprofit, tax-exempt, social welfare organization, and contributions to it are not tax-deductible. AFP is legally required to operate as nonpartisan: it may not endorse or oppose political candidates, its primary purpose may not be political, it must be primarily engaged in social welfare activities, and no more than half its expenditures may be political.

=== AFP Foundation ===
David H. Koch chaired the board of directors of the AFP Foundation. Other directors include Pfotenhauer, Debra Humphreys, and Cy Nobles. The AFP Foundation is an associate member of the State Policy Network, a national network of free-market oriented think tanks. As a 501(c)(3) non-profit, tax-exempt charity, contributions to the AFP Foundation are tax deductible, and such charities are largely prohibited from political activity.

=== AFP Action ===
Americans for Prosperity Action is a super PAC that supports conservative candidates. It spent more than $47 million to support or oppose candidates in 2020 elections.

=== Transparency ===
Tax-exempt, nonprofit charitable organizations such as AFP are generally not required to disclose their contributors, unlike political action committees. Some campaign finance watchdogs and Democrats have criticized AFP for what they perceive to be its funding of political activities from undisclosed sources. For example, the Sunlight Foundation and others have accused non-disclosing political groups like AFP of filing for nonprofit status solely to invoke the right to hide their donors. President Obama, speaking at a Democratic National Committee fundraising dinner in August 2010, criticized AFP for its political spending and non-disclosure of donors. The Democratic Congressional Campaign Committee filed a complaint with the IRS charging that the AFP Foundation had funded political advertisements in violation of the law applicable to the foundation's tax-exempt classification. AFP responded that the charges were without merit. AFP President Tim Phillips later suggested that the reason for the Democrats' filing of the complaint was simply that they were scared of the impact the organization was having.

In 2010 and 2011, AFP reported to the IRS that it was not involved in political activities. Questioned by a reporter before the 2012 Wisconsin recall elections, AFP's Wisconsin director said AFP was educating the public and not engaging in political activity. In 2014, an AFP spokesperson said AFP had the right to keep its donors private, citing NAACP v. Alabama, a 1958 Supreme Court ruling that protected National Association for the Advancement of Colored People (NAACP) donors from potential harassment. In 2014, Phillips said that protecting donors' identities was prudent given the Obama administration's ideology-based IRS targeting of citizens. The AFP Foundation said its supporters have received serious threats. In February 2015, a federal judge granted the Foundation's motion for a preliminary injunction staying California Attorney General Kamala Harris's request for the names and addresses of Foundation donors, pending resolution of the legality of the request.

=== Funding ===
While AFP does not disclose its funding sources, some supporters have acknowledged their contributions and investigative journalism has documented others. AFP has been funded by the Kochs and others.

At AFP's 2009 Defending the Dream summit, David Koch said he and his brother Charles provided the initial funding for AFP. In initial funding, David Koch was the top contributor to the founding of the AFP Foundation at $850,000. Several American companies also provided initial funding of the AFP Foundation, including $275,000 from State Farm Insurance and lesser amounts from 1-800 Contacts, medical products firm Johnson & Johnson, and carpet and flooring manufacturer Shaw Industries.

Later grants from the Koch family foundations include $1 million in 2008 to AFP from the David H. Koch Charitable Foundation and $3 million between 2005 and 2007 to the AFP Foundation from the Claude R. Lambe Charitable Foundation, controlled by Charles Koch. Other grants from Koch-related funding sources include $32.3 million in 2012 and $1.5 million in 2013 from Freedom Partners and $4.2 million through 2011 to the AFP Foundation from the Center to Protect Patient Rights.

Between 2003 and 2012, the AFP Foundation received $4.17 million from the John William Pope Foundation, chaired by AFP director Pope, the largest identifiable donor to the AFP Foundation. In 2011, the AFP Foundation received $3 million from the foundation of the family of billionaire Richard DeVos, the founder of Amway, making the DeVos family the second largest identifiable donor to the AFP Foundation. In 2010, AFP received half a million dollars from the Bradley Foundation. AFP received smaller grants in 2012 from tobacco company Reynolds American and in 2010 and 2012 from the American Petroleum Institute. The donor-advised fund Donors Trust granted $11 million to AFP between 2002 and 2010 and $7 million to the AFP Foundation in 2010.

== Tea Party movement and 2010 midterm election ==
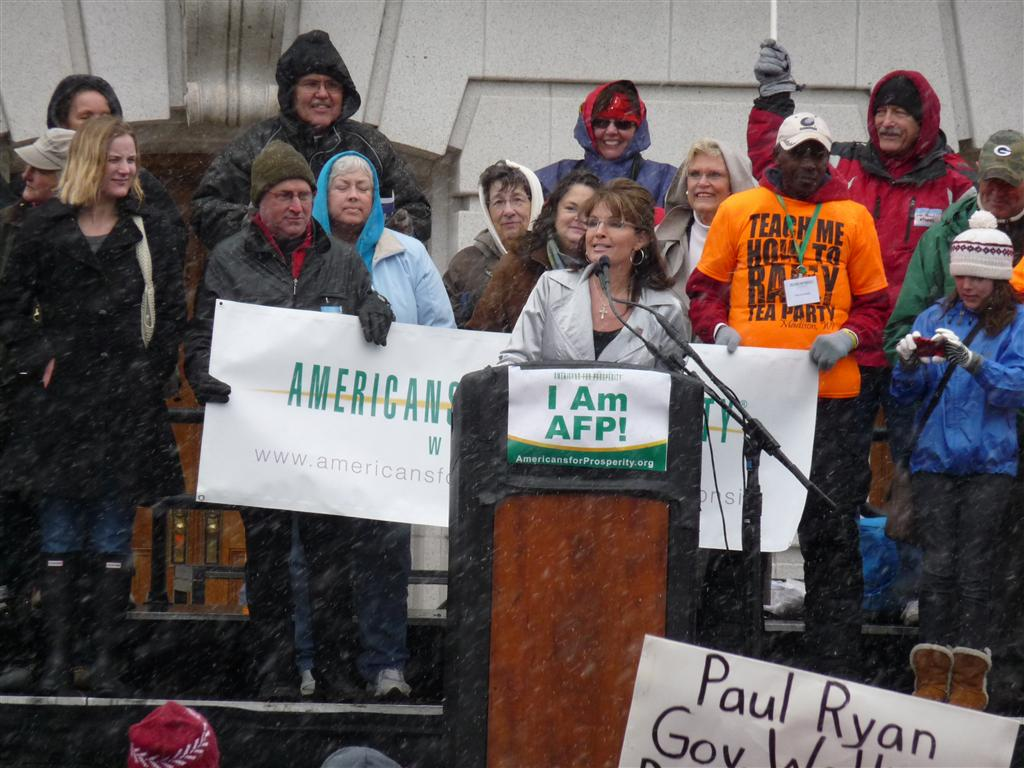
Sarah Palin at the Americans for Prosperity-run 2011 Tax Day Tea Party Rally in Madison, Wisconsin, in April 2011

AFP helped transform the nascent Tea Party movement into a political force.

AFP supported the Tea Party movement by obtaining permits and supplying speakers for rallies. AFP helped organize and publicize a "Porkulus"-themed protest on the state capitol steps in Denver, Colorado on February 17, 2009, in conjunction with Obama signing the American Recovery and Reinvestment Act of 2009. Within hours of CNBC on-air editor Rick Santelli's remarks on February 19, 2009, that criticized the Act and called for a "Chicago tea party," AFP registered and launched the website "TaxDayTeaParty.com," calling for protests against Obama. AFP had a lead role in organizing Taxpayer Tea Party rallies in Sacramento, Austin, and Madison in April 2009. AFP was one of the leading organizers of the September 2009 Taxpayer March on Washington, also known as the "9/12 Tea Party," according to The Guardian. On April 16, 2011, former Republican vice presidential candidate Sarah Palin was the keynote speaker at an AFP annual tax day tea party rally at the state capitol in Madison, Wisconsin.

In the 2010 midterm elections, AFP played a major role in achieving a Republican majority in the U.S. House of Representatives. AFP supported tea party groups, purchased political advertisements, and sponsored a nationwide bus tour themed "November is Coming" to recruit organizers and canvassers. AFP helped Tea Party groups organize voter registration drives. An AFP website offered "Tea party Talking Points." The organization provided Tea Party activists with education on policy, training in methods, and lists of politicians to target. In October 2010, AFP sponsored a workshop on the political use of the internet at a Tea Party convention in Virginia. AFP said it spent $40 million on rallies, phone banks, and canvassing during the 2010 election cycle. Of the six freshman Republican members of the House Committee on Energy and Commerce in 2010, five benefited from AFP advertisements and grassroots activity.

David Weigel wrote in Slate that AFP "in the Tea Party era evolved into one of the most powerful conservative organizations in electoral politics." AFP and the Tea Party share many of the same principles. In 2010, AFP was one of the most influential organizations in the Tea Party movement, and the largest in terms of membership and spending. According to Bloomberg News, with AFP the Koch brothers "harnessed the Tea Party's energy in service of their own policy goals, including deregulation and lower taxes....As the Tea Party movement grew in the aftermath of Obama's election, the Kochs positioned Americans for Prosperity as the Tea Party's staunchest ally".

== Labor law ==
AFP advocates for a reduction in public sector union benefits and pensions, in conjunction with curtailments of public sector collective bargaining rights. AFP has opposed raising the minimum wage.

=== Wisconsin collective bargaining ===
AFP's activities in Wisconsin developed the state into the nation's foremost conservative-progressive battleground, and AFP used tactics in Wisconsin that were applied in later campaigns.

AFP has been a major supporter of Republican Wisconsin Governor Scott Walker. In 2009 and 2010, AFP helped raise the statewide profile of Walker, then Milwaukee County county executive, by inviting him to address its rallies. In 2011, when Walker's agenda of reduced spending, cuts to union benefits, and limits on public-sector collective bargaining drew thousands in opposition to the streets around the state capitol in Madison, AFP bussed in hundreds to counter-protest. AFP spent $320,000 on television advertisements and sponsored a website and bus tour themed "Stand Against Spending, Stand With Walker", and spent a total of $7 million in support of Walker.

AFP spent $3 million in opposition to the recall campaign against Walker in 2011–2012 and sent 75 trained canvassers to Wisconsin. After the passage of Walker's signature legislation, the 2011 Wisconsin Act 10, which limited collective bargaining rights for most public employees, AFP ran advertisements and held town-hall meetings with the theme "It's Working Wisconsin!" Days before the recall election, AFP sponsored a ten-city bus tour themed "A Better Wisconsin." In the context of Walker's 2014 reelection campaign, AFP purchased television issue advertisements in support of Act 10.

=== Michigan right-to-work ===
Americans for Prosperity's Wisconsin campaign curtailing collective bargaining rights and turning back a recall demonstrated to AFP that similar efforts could succeed in Michigan. A top priority of AFP in Michigan was right-to-work legislation, which prohibited employers from deducting union dues from employee pay checks and prohibited labor contracts from excluding non-union members.

AFP had opposed Michigan Governor Rick Snyder, a Republican, on a number of issues, including the Detroit River International Crossing Bridge project, an expansion of Medicaid funded by the federal Patient Protection and Affordable Care Act, and a road bill which raised taxes. AFP coordinated support for right-to-work in Michigan. The AFP Foundation produced a 15-page booklet titled Unions: The Good, the Bad and the Ugly: How forced unionization has harmed workers and Michigan. AFP's website urged members to gather at the state capital in Lansing on December 6, 2012, and some three hundred protestors showed up. AFP bussed in activists and offered supporters $25 gas cards, free lunch, and drinks. AFP reserved space and erected a large heated tent near the Capitol steps for supporters. On the morning of December 6, during a lame duck session of the Republican-controlled Michigan legislature, Snyder called a joint press conference with the legislative leadership to announce fast-track right-to-work legislation. The legislation passed both houses of the Michigan legislature that day, as protesters and counterprotesters demonstrated outside. Michigan state police responded. AFP said protesters tore down the AFP tent. No arrests were made. On December 10, President Obama visited Daimler AG's Detroit Diesel factory in Redford, Michigan, and told employees the legislation was about the "right to work for less money." Snyder signed the legislation on December 11. In 2014, Snyder ran for reelection and AFP posted an online advertisement praising his legislative record.

== Obama reelection ==
AFP ran an early television advertising campaign opposing Obama's reelection. An August 2012 ProPublica analysis of broadcast television political advertising purchases by category showed that two nonprofit organizations, AFP and Crossroads GPS, combined, outspent all other categories, including political parties, political action committees, super PACs, unions, and trade associations. While previously AFP had run issue advertising that opposed Obama's programs, in August 2012 the organization shifted to express advocacy, which explicitly called for his defeat. That month, AFP spent $25 million on television commercials against Obama. AFP said the goal of the commercials was to educate voters. AFP raised $140 million in the 2012 election cycle, and it spent $122 million, more than in all the previous eight years since its founding. The organization spent more than $33.5 million on television advertisements opposing Obama's reelection.

In 2011 and 2012, AFP spent $8.4 million in swing states on television advertisements denouncing a loan guarantee the Department of Energy had made to Solyndra, a manufacturer of solar panels. Solyndra was the first recipient of such a guarantee under the American Recovery and Reinvestment Act of 2009, and the company went bankrupt. In January 2012, The Wall Street Journal said AFP's Solyndra campaign was "perhaps the biggest attack on Mr. Obama so far in the 2012 election campaign." AFP sent a bus on a nationwide tour condemning Obama's economic policies called the "Obama's Failing Agenda Tour."

In April 2011 in New Hampshire, AFP sponsored an informal gathering of five Republican presidential candidates, including Mitt Romney, Tim Pawlenty, Michele Bachmann, Rick Santorum, and Herman Cain. AFP offered Tea Party groups $2 for every new AFP member their volunteers signed up at polling places in the February 2012 Florida Republican primary. AFP employed methodologies developed in its efforts to thwart the recall of Wisconsin governor Scott Walker, including deploying a smartphone application called "Prosperity Knocks" to canvassers. AFP canvassers utilized "Themis", an online voter database of millions of Americans. Phillips said that AFP's canvassing support application offered field operatives the previous voting history of voters integrated with census data and consumer data including purchases, magazine subscriptions, and favorite websites.

== Programs and advocacy ==
=== Energy and environment ===
AFP supports oil and gas development and opposes regulation, including environmental restrictions. The AFP Foundation opposed Obama's efforts to address global warming. AFP was important in creating the Tea Party movement and in encouraging the movement to focus on climate change. AFP helped defeat proposed U.S. legislation embracing cap and trade, a market-based approach to control pollution by providing economic incentives. In August 2009, Mother Jones magazine identified cap and trade as one of the key domestic policy goals of the Obama administration, and identified AFP as one of the most prominent groups in opposition.

In 2008, AFP circulated the No Climate Tax Pledge to government officials at the federal, state, and local levels, a pledge to "oppose any legislation relating to climate change that includes a net increase in government revenue." By July 2013, 411 lawmakers and candidates, including a quarter of U.S. Senators and more than a third of U.S. Representatives, primarily Republicans, had signed the pledge. Of the twelve Republicans on the House Energy and Commerce Committee in 2011, nine signed the pledge.

AFP held more than eighty events in opposition to cap and trade, including the nationwide Hot Air Tour, which involved floating hot air balloons in protest of what AFP described as "global warming alarmism." AFP raised a balloon in Phoenix, Arizona, in fall 2008 and also over Al Gore's house in Tennessee. AFP described cap and trade as "the largest excise tax in history." AFP sponsored a Regulation Reality Tour to foment opposition to climate change legislation and federal regulation of carbon emissions. The tour involved fake "carbon cops" with badges in green Smart cars with flashing lights who wrote citations for "carbon crimes" like running a lawn mower. In 2011, AFP launched a Running on Empty website and national tour featuring a 14-foot inflatable gas pump intended to link rising gas prices to the Obama administration's environmental regulations and to promote offshore drilling for oil. Long lines formed in several states in 2012 when AFP offered drivers gas discounted to the price in effect when Obama took office. In 2012, AFP campaigned against Republican political candidates who acknowledged the science of climate change.

AFP advocates for the construction of the proposed Keystone XL Pipeline. In February 2015, AFP organized supporters to telephone the White House urging Obama to sign legislation authorizing the project. AFP led an effort to repeal a federal tax credit for wind power. In Kansas, Ohio, North Carolina, and other states, AFP campaigned to overturn renewable portfolio standards, state laws that mandated a percentage of the state's electricity come from renewable resources. AFP announced plans to oppose Republican candidates who support a carbon tax in the 2016 presidential primaries.

=== Health care and 2014 midterm ===
AFP has described itself as the nation's largest grassroots champion for health care freedom. In August 2009, Mother Jones magazine identified health care reform as one of the key domestic policy goals of the Obama administration, and identified AFP as one of the most prominent groups in opposition. AFP sponsored two other groups advocating against the Obama administration's proposed health care reform, Patients United Now and Patients First.

In May 2009, AFP launched Patients United Now, which opposed a single-payer health care system and a government-funded health insurance option. It purchased television advertisements warning of "government-controlled health care" or a "Washington takeover" of health care. In one Patients United Now television advertisement, a Canadian woman, Shona Holmes, said she could not get timely treatment in Canada and ultimately was treated in the U.S. Patients United Now staged more than three hundred rallies to oppose the Obama administration's proposed Patient Protection and Affordable Care Act (ACA).

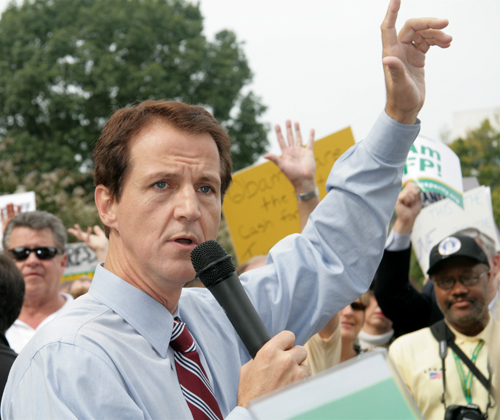
AFP president Tim Phillips speaking at an AFP health care rally next to the U.S. Capitol in October 2009

In summer 2009, Patients First sponsored a six-week "Hands Off My Health Care" bus tour. Hands Off My Health Care events included rallies protesting against the health care plan and collected signatures in an effort to raise awareness about free-market-based health care reforms.

After the ACA became law, AFP worked for its repeal and campaigned to block states from accepting federal funds made available under the law to expand Medicaid. State legislators who supported Medicaid expansion were targeted, including Republican Virginia state senators Emmett Hanger and John Watkins. AFP bussed in volunteers to a hearing in the state capital and to call constituents, distribute flyers, and send mailings. AFP campaigned against Medicaid expansion in Michigan, Louisiana, and Nebraska and helped defeat Medicaid expansion in Florida. AFP president Phillips said AFP advocated for repeal of the ACA to keep the issue "in front of the public" and to use the threat of a presidential veto to portray Obama as "unwilling to take some reasonable commonsense reforms." Phillips told The New York Times that a broader goal of AFP's anti-ACA advertising spending was to present the ACA as a "social welfare boondoggle" which would foster opposition to spending on climate change. In March 2012, AFP, with support from the California-based Tea Party Express, organized a rally at the Capitol during the Supreme Court's oral arguments regarding the constitutionality of the ACA.

AFP played a major role in the 2014 midterm elections, helping Republicans achieve a majority in the U.S. Senate. AFP targeted legislators who had supported the ACA four years earlier. AFP's first campaign advertisement aired in September 2013, and by January 2014 the organization had spent $20 million, by May, $35 million, and by July, $44 million, amounts unprecedented so early in a political campaign cycle. Senators targeted Kay Hagan, Mary Landrieu, Mark Begich, and Jeanne Shaheen, all Democrats. In early 2014, AFP ran nationwide advertisements featuring stories about people whose health care, according to the ads, had been compromised by the ACA, whom AFP termed "ObamaCare victims."

Between January 1, 2013, and August 31, 2014, in the campaign to control the Senate, AFP aired more than 27,000 television advertisements, about one in every 16 ads. AFP was one of the leading spenders on political advertising in 2014. AFP lead all non-political action committees in terms of spending on television air time for political advertisements in the 2014 election cycle through April.

=== Fiscal policy advocacy ===
AFP advocates limited government. Within two days of Obama's inauguration in January 2009, AFP launched a television advertising campaign and a website, "nostimulus.com", that featured an online "No Stimulus" petition addressed to U.S. senators, notifying them that the vote on Obama's first major legislative initiative, the American Recovery and Reinvestment Act, would be included in AFP's congressional rankings and urging a "no" vote. The petition characterized the Act as "dramatically increasing federal debt and spending...under the pretense of stimulus or recovery." Internet traffic overwhelmed the website, but it was unable to prevent passage in the legislature and a petition to repeal the act. In 2011, AFP opposed the extension of unemployment benefits, writing that unemployment benefits increase unemployment. In late 2012, AFP opposed a proposed federal relief bill after Hurricane Sandy, the second-costliest hurricane in U.S. history. AFP's New Jersey director questioned the federal government's role in natural disaster relief, saying it should be limited to the repair of federal buildings. AFP opposed smoking bans in Texas and Virginia.

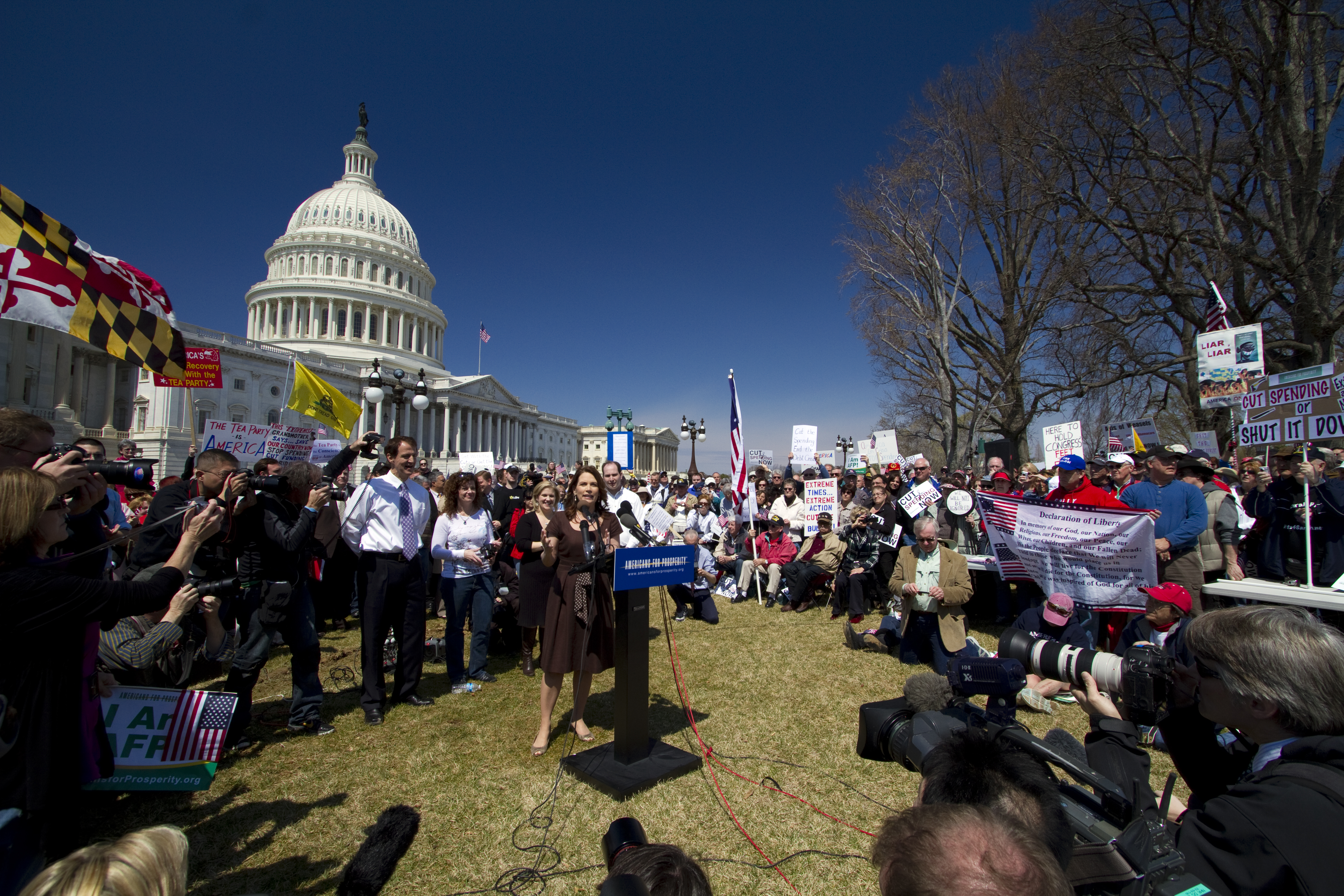
Michele Bachmann speaking at the "Cut the spending now" rally at the United States Capitol in Washington, D.C., on April 6, 2011 sponsored by Americans for Prosperity.

"Government overspending is the greatest threat to economic prosperity," according to AFP. In 2013, AFP launched a "Spending Accountability Project" which supported letting the $85 billion in automatic cuts to federal spending required by the budget sequestration take effect. AFP opposed the Bipartisan Budget Act of 2013, also known as the Ryan-Murray deal, which proposed $40 billion in spending in excess of the sequestration. AFP said the deal was "not just bad policy, it is bad politics" and noted the loss of the "hard-won bipartisan spending limits set by the sequester."

AFP advocates lower taxes. AFP opposed a 2006 cigarette tax hike in Indiana and helped fund the "No on 29" effort in opposition to California Proposition 29 (2012), which would have placed a $1 excise tax on tobacco products to fund smoking medical research and smoking cessation. In 2013 in Indiana, AFP ran a television advertising campaign in support of Governor Mike Pence's ten percent state income tax cut. AFP advocates for the repeal of the estate tax, which it calls the "death tax".

AFP advocates for free market solutions. In 2011, AFP sent mailings and funded radio advertisements criticizing the proposed construction of the Gordie Howe International Bridge, a publicly financed project that would compete with the nearby privately owned Ambassador Bridge linking Detroit, Michigan, with Windsor, Ontario; AFP charged that the project would be a waste of taxpayer money if toll revenues did not cover debt service. The bridge will be funded by Canada, and paid back with toll revenues.

AFP advocated the dissolution of the Export-Import Bank of the United States.

=== Other policy advocacy ===
AFP opposes consideration of race and economic class in the assignment of students to schools. According to the group's North Carolina state director, in 2009 the AFP ran voter education courses and supplied volunteers in school board-elections in Wake County, North Carolina. Wake County includes the state capital, Raleigh, and has the 18th-largest school district. AFP supported candidates who opposed desegregation busing, which AFP has called "forced busing". The group ran phone banks and canvassed in another school board election in Kenosha, Wisconsin, in 2014. It also helped organize rallies in favor of virtual and charter schools.

AFP is a member of the Internet Freedom Coalition, which opposes net neutrality. AFP's vice president for policy Phil Kerpen chaired the coalition. AFP supported January 2014's federal appeals court ruling against the Federal Communications Commission's authority to enforce net neutrality. AFP urged Congress to legislatively preempt regulation of the internet.

In 2016, AFP sponsored the Grassroots Leadership Academy, a training program designed to help build a conservative movement in response to the rise of Trumpism. In February 2023, the group hardened its stance against Trump, saying it would work to support a different Republican presidential nominee and that "we need to turn the page on the past".

APF also backs Concerned Veterans for America (CVA), which advocates for greater outsourcing of health care from the U.S. Department of Veterans Affairs. In 2016, CVA was placed in a group with other AFP projects, including the Latino front group Libre Initiative and the youth front group Generation Opportunity.

After Trump's 2024 reelection, the AFP announced a $20 million campaign to try to extend the tax cuts he introduced during his first term. This was part of a "herculean undertaking" to support deeper tax cuts and an "unwinding [of] as many of the growth and innovation killing regulations as possible".

=== Annual events ===
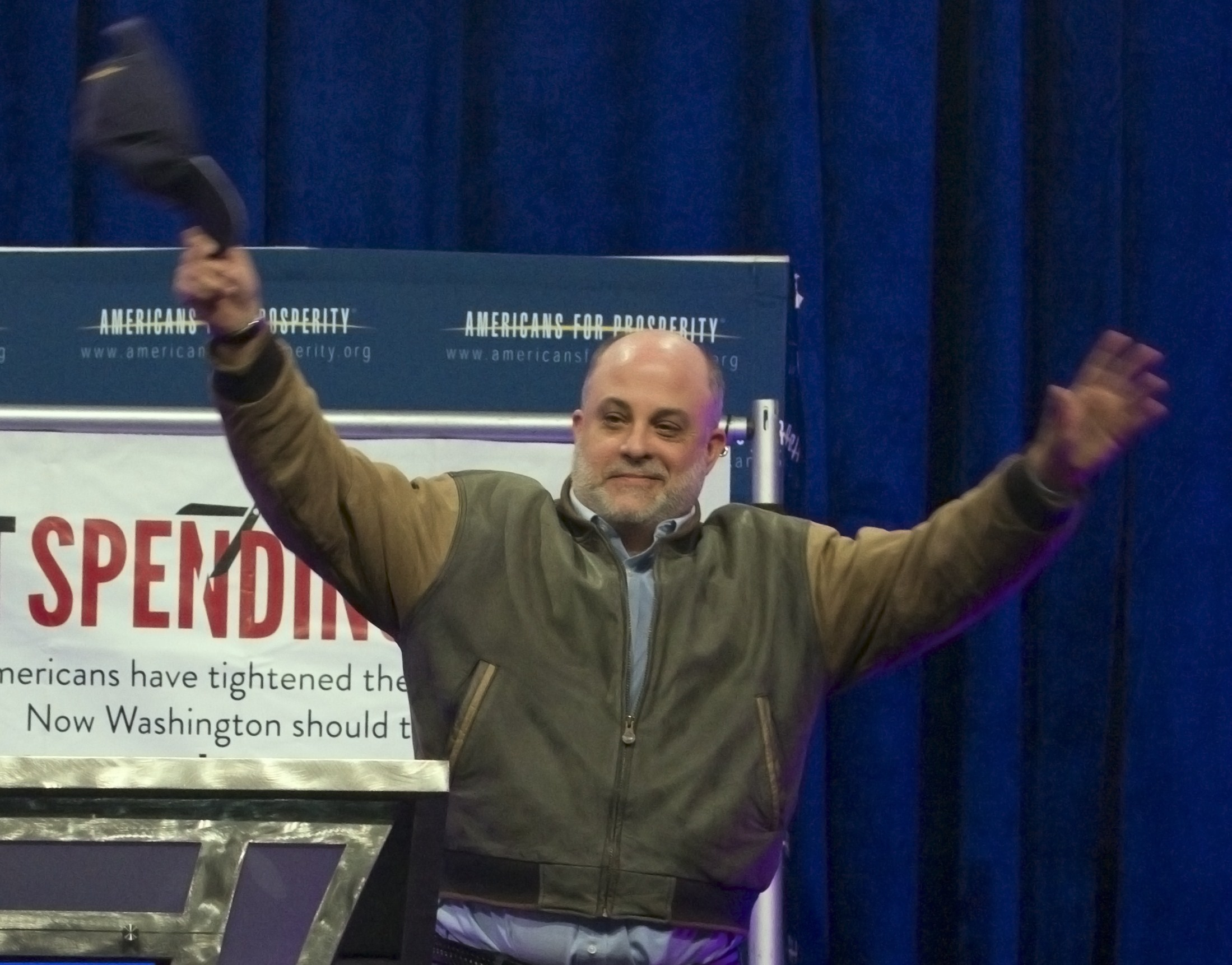
Political commentator Mark Levin at a Defending the American Dream event in 2007

In 2007, AFP began hosting a yearly Defending the American Dream Summit, which was for a time the second-largest annual gathering of conservatives in Washington, D.C. In conjunction with the July 2008 Netroots Nation conference in Austin, Texas, AFP hosted RightOnline, a conference of conservative bloggers and activists that aimed to develop conservative social media strategies, which became an annual event.

== Election-related activities ==
In June 2011, AFP placed fake eviction notices on doors in the Delray neighborhood of Detroit, stating that homes might be taken to make way for the Detroit River International Crossing project.

In August 2011, AFP mailed absentee voter applications to Democratic voters in at least two recall elections in Wisconsin that included a filing deadline two days after the election. The return envelopes were addressed to an "Absentee Ballot Application Processing Center" with the post office box number of Wisconsin Family Action, a socially conservative group, rather than to the clerk's office. Responding to charges of voter suppression, AFP said the incorrect date was a "printing mistake" and was intended only for voters in the two districts where Democrats are set to face recalls on a later date. The state board of elections opened an investigation.

In 2013 in Virginia and 2014 in Arkansas, the AFP Foundation mailed "voter history report cards," which included the public-record voting history of both the addressee and its neighbors.

A 2014 television advertisement targeting Democratic U.S. Senate candidate Gary Peters of Michigan for his support of the Affordable Care Act featured leukemia patient Julie Boonstra, who said she could no longer afford the cost of her treatment after the ACA. The Washington Post reported that the advertisement had "significant factual errors and/or obvious contradictions." Boonstra would save at least $1,000 a year under the ACA, according to The Detroit News. AFP aired another television advertisement in which Boonstra said Peters was trying to silence her. AFP apologized for another television advertisement that criticized the ACA and Democratic Senator Mark Udall, a candidate for reelection, using images of a somber Obama and Udall from their visit to Aurora, Colorado, in the wake of the mass shooting there.

In April 2014, AFP mailed voters in at least eight West Virginia counties material that may have led them to believe they were ineligible to vote in an upcoming primary election. The mailings, received just before the deadline to update voter registration, included registration cards and prepaid return envelopes addressed to county clerks, with a message cautioning voters that if they did not update their voter registration, they might lose their right to vote in the upcoming primary election. AFP's West Virginia director said the mailings were a non-partisan, get out the vote effort targeting unregistered voters.

In September 2014, AFP was investigated by the state board of elections of North Carolina after the state Democratic Party filed a complaint regarding an AFP voter registration mailing labelled "official application form" containing inaccurate information including an incorrect filing deadline five days before the actual deadline. AFP stated the mistakes in the North Carolina mailings were "administrative errors."

In 2017, AFP ran ads attacking Virginia Democratic candidate for governor Ralph Northam.

In 2018, the New Hampshire attorney general's office began investigating the nonprofit status of AFP after a group of Republican representatives accused the conservative activist group of improperly wading into state elections. The investigation was closed after the attorney general's office concluded the mailers in question constituted permitted issue advocacy and not political advocacy.

The organization said that it may support Democrats in the 2020 United States elections as part of a broader effort to adjust its strategy.

In March 2023, the group said it was opposing Trump's reelection as president and was seeking an alternative to Kari Lake in her 2024 Senate run.

The group supported Lily Wu's successful campaign for mayor of Wichita, Kansas, in the November 2023 election. Wu had completed an associate program at the Charles Koch Institute.

On November 28, 2023, the group announced its support for Nikki Haley in her campaign for the Republican Party's nomination for president of the United States in the 2024 United States presidential election.

On February 25, 2024, after she lost the primary in her home state, the group cut funding to Haley's campaign.

== See also ==
- Concerned Veterans for America
- Concerned Veterans for America Action
- Donors Trust
- Mark Block, former AFP Wisconsin state director
- Political activities of the Koch brothers
- The LIBRE Initiative
