= Carl Brewer (politician) =

American politician (1957–2020)

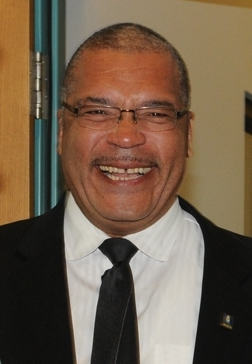

100th Mayor of Wichita, Kansas
- In office April 10, 2007 – April 13, 2015
- Preceded by: Carlos Mayans
- Succeeded by: Jeff Longwell

Personal details
- Born: March 8, 1957 Wichita, Kansas, U.S.
- Died: June 12, 2020 (aged 63) Wichita, Kansas, U.S.
- Party: Democratic
- Spouse: Cathy Brewer (m. 1980)
- Children: 4 (including Carol)
- Education: Southern University (BA)

Military service
- Branch/service: Kansas Army National Guard
- Years of service: 1977–1998
- Rank: Captain

Carl Brewer (March 8, 1957 – June 12, 2020) was an American politician who served as the 100th mayor of Wichita, Kansas, and was the city's second elected black mayor. He was elected to the mayoralty in 2007 and reelected in 2011.

He was a member of the Democratic Party and ran for the party's gubernatorial nomination in 2018.

== Early life and education ==
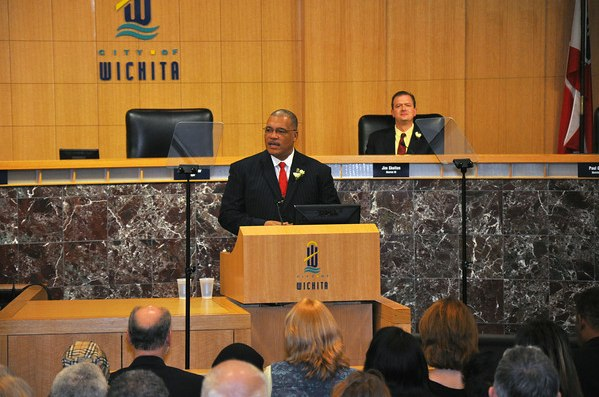
Brewer delivering the 2009 Wichita State of the City address

Carl Brewer was born on March 8, 1957, in Wichita, Kansas. In 1975, he graduated from North High School and briefly attended Friends University. He earned a Bachelor of Arts degree in criminal justice from Southern University. From 1977 to 1998, he served in the Kansas Army National Guard and retired as a captain. In 1980, Brewer married Cathy Brewer and the couple had four children.

== Career ==
Before getting into politics Carl Brewer worked in the aircraft industry for over 30 years. He started as a sheet metal worker and a union steward. Later, he worked in the management department at Spirit AeroSystems.

=== Wichita municipal politics ===
From 2001 to 2007, Brewer served in the Wichita city council from District 1. In 2004, he ran in a special election to replace state senator Rip Gooch, but was defeated by Donald Betts.

In 2007, he was elected mayor of Wichita becoming the city's second elected black mayor; A. Price Woodard Jr. was selected by the city council to serve as mayor for one term in 1970. He was reelected in the 2011 mayoral election. He left office in 2015 and was succeeded by Jeff Longwell.

=== 2018 gubernatorial campaign and aftermath ===
Despite speculation, Brewer declined to run for Governor of Kansas in the 2014 election against incumbent Sam Brownback.

On February 20, 2017, he announced that he would run for the Democratic nomination in the 2018 gubernatorial election. His running mate was Chris Morrow, the mayor of Gardner, for lieutenant gubernatorial nomination. Brewer was endorsed by Joan Wagnon, a former mayor of Topeka. He was defeated by state senator Laura Kelly, taking 20% of the vote.

Brewer served on Kelly's transition team after she defeated Republican nominee Kris Kobach in the general election. Kelly appointed him to serve on the Governor's Council on Tax Reform.

In 2019, he and Robert G. Knight appeared in a commercial asking for Lyndy Wells to launch a write-in campaign for the 2019 Wichita mayoral election.

== Death ==
On June 12, 2020, Brewer died in Wichita after a long struggle with an illness. Following his death, the Wichita city council had the city's flags flown at half-staff and Governor Laura Kelly said that "Carl truly embodied all of the best qualities of what it means to be a Kansan, and he will be dearly missed."

== Personal life ==
Brewer was a Catholic. He was a member of Wichita's African American Catholic Council.

== Electoral history ==
2007 Wichita mayoral election
Primary election
Party	Candidate	Votes	%
Nonpartisan	Carl Brewer	13,155	57.7
Nonpartisan	Carlos Mayans (incumbent)	5,882	25.8
Nonpartisan	Larry G. White	1,474	6.5
Nonpartisan	Darrell E. Leffew	984	4.3
Nonpartisan	James D. Mendenhall	742	3.3
Nonpartisan	Randy Pace	327	1.4
Nonpartisan	King David Davis	250	1.1
Total votes		22,814	100.0
General election
Nonpartisan	Carl Brewer	28,390	61.7
Nonpartisan	Carlos Mayans (incumbent)	17,230	37.5
Write-in		359	0.8
Total votes		45,979	100.0

2011 Wichita mayoral election
Primary election
Party	Candidate	Votes	%
Nonpartisan	Carl Brewer (incumbent)	11,401	76.9
Nonpartisan	Darrell E. Leffew	1,470	9.9
Nonpartisan	Paul Rhodes	800	5.4
Nonpartisan	Martin "Marty" Mork	546	3.7
Nonpartisan	Roy R. Malcom	302	2.0
Nonpartisan	Scott Thode	308	2.1
Total votes		14,827	100.0
General election
Nonpartisan	Carl Brewer (incumbent)	17,285	69.6
Nonpartisan	Darrell E. Leffew	7,494	30.2
Write-in		66	0.2
Total votes		24,845	9.57

2018 Kansas gubernatorial Democratic primary
Party	Candidate	Votes	%
Democratic	Laura Kelly	80,377	51.4
Democratic	Carl Brewer	31,493	20.2
Democratic	Josh Svaty	27,292	17.5
Democratic	Arden Andersen	13,161	8.4
Democratic	Jack Bergeson	3,950	2.5
Total votes		156,273	100.0

== See also ==
- List of first African-American mayors
