= Carlos Mayans =

American politician (born 1948)

Member of the Kansas House of Representatives from the 100th district
- In office January 11, 1993 – January 13, 2003
- Preceded by: Jack Sluiter
- Succeeded by: Mario Goico

Mayor of Wichita, Kansas
- In office 2003–2007
- Preceded by: Robert G. Knight
- Succeeded by: Carl Brewer

Personal details
- Born: July 8, 1948 (age 78) Havana, Cuba
- Party: Republican
- Spouse: Linda

Carlos Mayans (born July 8, 1948) is a Cuba-born American politician. A member of the Republican party, he was elected mayor of the city of Wichita, Kansas in April 2003.

== Early life ==
He was born in Havana, Cuba on July 8, 1948. He emigrated to the United States through the Operation Peter Pan shortly after the Cuban Revolution of 1959.

== Political career ==
In addition to serving as mayor, Mayans also served as a Republican representative for Wichita's 100th district in the Kansas House of Representatives for five terms and ran an insurance agency before becoming mayor. He lost a re-election bid for mayor to Carl Brewer by 61% to 37% in 2007. In the 2008 Republican presidential primary, he supported Mitt Romney's campaign.
