= Mount Washington College =

For-profit college in Manchester, New Hampshire (1900–2016)

Coordinates: 42°58′20″N 71°28′10″W

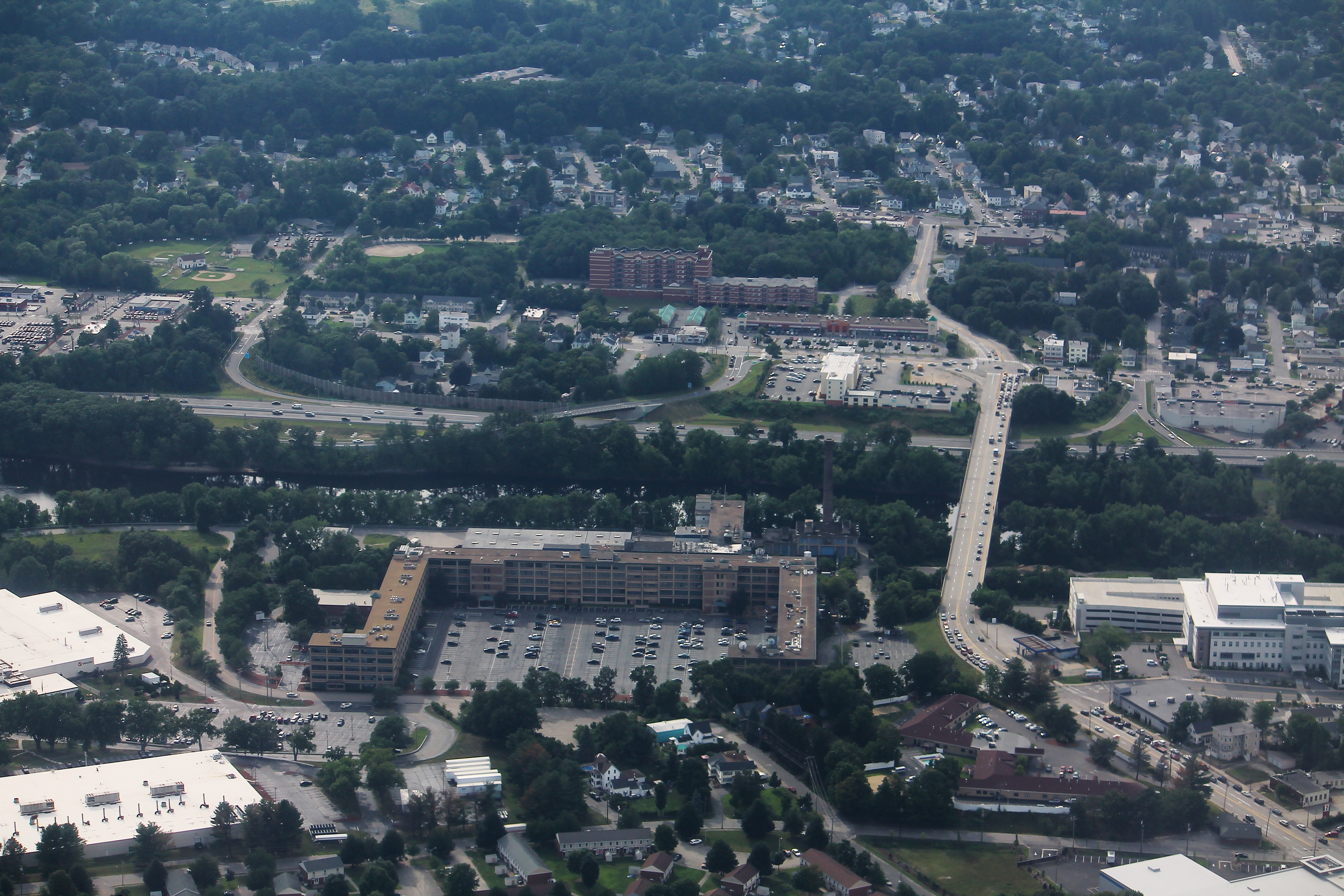
- Aerial view of the location in Manchester
- Former names: Hesser College (1900-2013), Hesser Business College
- Type: For-profit
- Active: 1900–2016
- Location: Manchester, New Hampshire, United States

Mount Washington College was a for-profit college in Manchester, New Hampshire, United States. It opened in 1900 and was known as Hesser College until 2013. It was owned by Kaplan, Inc., and offered associate and bachelor's degrees focused in business and information technology. It was accredited by the New England Association of Schools and Colleges (NEASC).

It closed in May 2016.

== Campus locations ==
Mount Washington College had five campus locations — in Manchester, Nashua, Portsmouth, Salem and Concord, where the school offered associate's and bachelor's degrees in a range of programs including business, information technology, digital media, criminal justice, liberal studies, healthcare management, psychology, and paralegal studies. The school also had an expanded national presence via its online education programs where students could obtain an associate's or bachelor's degree in business or information technology.

== Academics ==
Old Hesser College logo

The location of the Manchester campus, among the Sundial Center of Commerce & Education, enabled students to have exposure to local businesses and potential internships not available in other locations and in other small colleges. The college incorporated a unique advisory program to ensure that students choose appropriate fields of study based on their specific strengths.

Mount Washington College also had what was known as the "Mount Washington Commitment", an innovative program that allowed prospective students to attend the college in their selected field without any tuition obligation. When the introductory period was over, students had the option to continue their studies or drop out without having to pay for classes.

Academically, Mount Washington maintained a relatively low student-faculty ratio for a college. The school encouraged students to continue their education to improve their professions. Student life incorporated various student organizations. The urban setting provided numerous opportunities for student life and professional opportunities.

The eight-week semester of many courses was popular amongst the students at the college, allowing for flexibility and solid career skill foundation.

The college offered multiple scholarships and financial aid, as well as federal work study programs that helped students pay for tuition and fees.

The college had resources for students with disabilities and had a good success rate for students with learning disabilities. In 2000 the college began offering information technology programs, and was recognized as a Microsoft Authorized Academic Training Program Institution.

== History ==
Founded as Hesser Business College in Manchester in 1900, Mount Washington College followed the principle of providing individual encouragement and assistance to all students instilled by its founder, Joel H. Hesser. Hesser was a New Hampshire educator and businessman who believed in providing educational opportunities for every citizen.

Hesser College began to expand its educational services beyond the city of Manchester in 1975 when the first extension campus was opened in Nashua, renting space at Bishop Guertin High School. In the decades that followed, additional campuses were opened in Portsmouth, Salem, and Concord.

In 2000 Hesser College celebrated its 100-year anniversary. In 2001 the college was approved by the New Hampshire Division of Higher Education to grant additional baccalaureate degrees in business administration. In 2005 the school offered bachelor of science degrees in psychology.

In July 2013, it was announced that Hesser College had changed its name to Mount Washington College. The college's new name also came with new online degree options.

On July 10, 2014, the college announced it was closing its Nashua and Salem campuses by September 2014 and laying off 50 employees. The closure of the campuses was due to the recent decline of student enrollment by 30%. This closure comes approximately one year after the college closed its Concord and Portsmouth campuses.

On August 4, 2015, the college's board of trustees announced it was closing the college. The college taught out their programs and closed their last remaining campus, in Manchester.
