= Tom Kessler =

American politician

Member of the Kansas House of Representatives from the 96th district
- Incumbent
- Assumed office January 11, 2021
- Preceded by: Stephanie Yeager
- Succeeded by: Jessica Maldonado (elect)

Personal details
- Party: Republican

Tom Kessler is an American politician. He served as a Republican member for the 96th district of the Kansas House of Representatives.

In 2021, Kessler won the election for the 96th district of the Kansas House of Representatives against Stephanie Yeager with 53.3% of the vote. Kessler assumed his office on January 11, 2021. In 2023 he ran unopposed and was re-elected to his position. He owned a liquor store.

In 2025, Kessler as Chair of the House Federal State and Affairs Committee pushed forward a bill to legalize the sale of tobacco products in vending machines. The bill died in committee.
