= Mayor of Wichita, Kansas =

Head executive of the Wichita government

Mayor of the City of Wichita
- Flag of Wichita

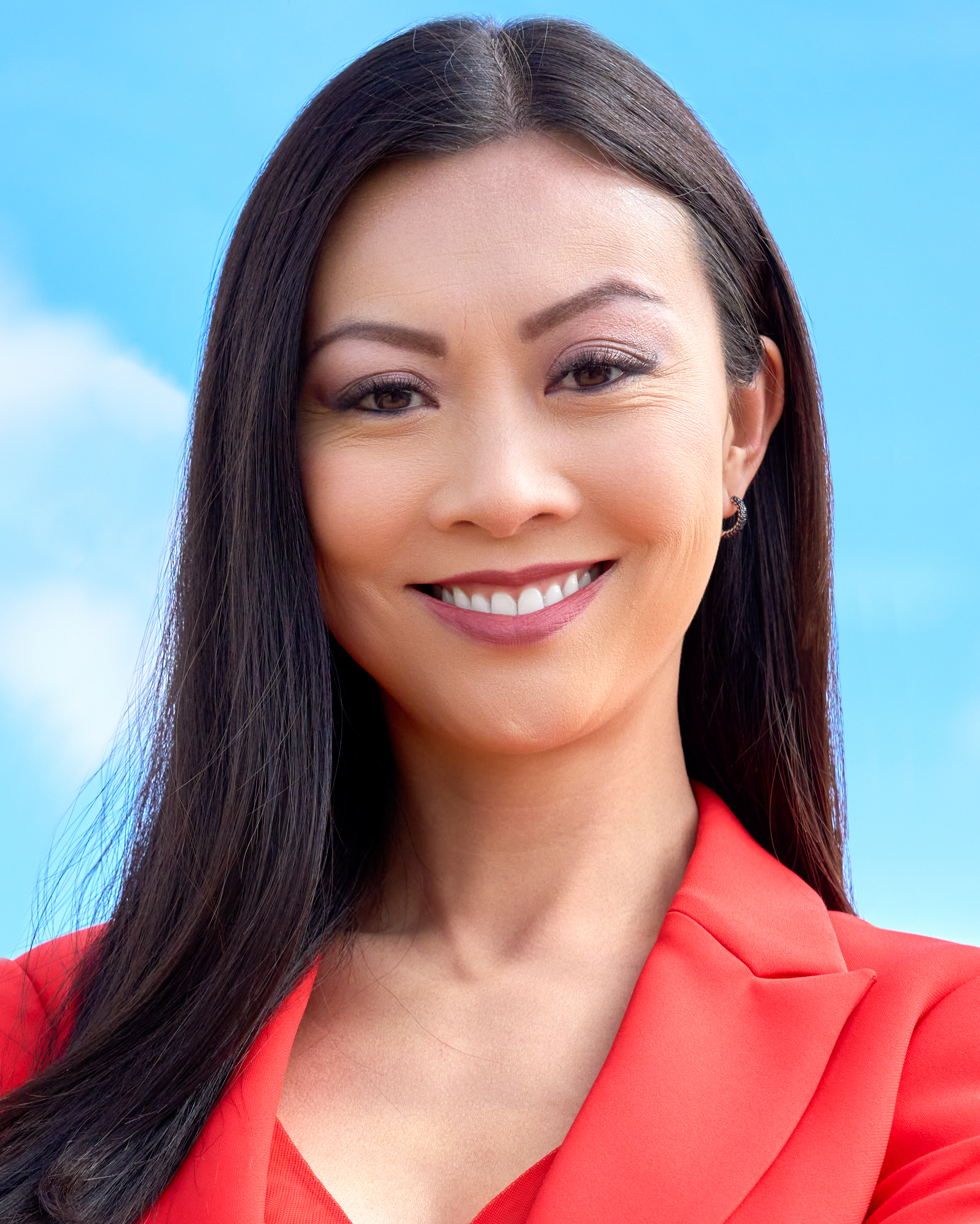
- Incumbent; Lily Wu since January 8, 2024
- Term length: Four years, renewable once
- Inaugural holder: Edwin Bird Allen
- Formation: 1871
- Website: Mayor's Office

The mayor of the City of Wichita is the head of the executive branch of the Wichita, Kansas city government. The mayor serves a four-year term and is limited to two successive terms.

== List ==
Following is a list of mayors of the American city of Wichita, Kansas. As of 2024, there have been 81 people who have served as mayor of Wichita in 103 administrations excluding one honorary mayor.

Number	Person	Image	Mayor	Years	Notes
1	1		Edwin Bird Allen	1871–1872	Elder brother of mayor Joseph P. Allen
2	2		James G. Hope (1st term)	1873–1874	
3	3		George E. Harris	1875	
4	(2)		James G. Hope (2nd term)	1876–1877	
5	4		William Greiffenstein (1st term)	1878	
6	5		Sol H. Kohn	1879	First Jewish mayor of Wichita
7	(4)		William Greiffenstein (2nd term)	1879–1884	
8	6		Benajah W. Aldrich	1885–1886	
9	7		Joseph P. Allen	1887–1888	
10	8		George W. Clement	1889–1890	
11	9		John B. Carey	1891–1892	
12	10		Lindley Murray Cox	1893–1896	
13	11		Finlay Ross (1st term)	1897–1900	
14	12		Benjamin Franklin McLean (1st term)	1901–1904	
15	(11)		Finlay Ross (2nd term)	1905–1906	
16	13		John H. Graham (1st term)	1907–1908	
17	14		Charles Lock Davidson	1909–1910	
18	(13)		John H. Graham (2nd term)	April 1911 – Sept 1911	Lost recall election in September 1911
19	15		William Walter Minick	1911–1912	
20	16		William Jasper Babb	1913–1914	
21	17		Orsemus Hills Bentley	1915–1916	
22	18		Lewis William Clapp	1917–1919	Resigned on October 3, 1919 to become City Manager
23	19		John Lee Powell	1919–1920	
24	20		Wallace C. Kemp	1921–1922	
25	21		George Henry Hamilton	1922	
26	22		William Coffin Coleman	1922–1923	
27	(12)		Benjamin Franklin McLean (2nd term)	1923–1924	
28	23		Frank Leslie Dunn (1st term)	1924–1925	
29	24		Ben F. Copley	1925–1926	
30	25		Frank Nighswonger (1st term)	1926–1927	
31	26		A.J. Coombs	1927–1928	
32	(23)		Frank Leslie Dunn (2nd term)	1928–1929	
33	27		Charles S. Lawrence (1st term)	1929–1930	
34	28		Herman A. Hill	1930–1931	
35	(25)		Frank Nighswonger (2nd term)	1931–1932	
36	29		Harry D. Cottman	1932–1933	
37	(27)		Charles S. Lawrence (2nd term)	1933–1934	
38	30		James Schuyler Crawford	1934–1935	
39	(25)		Frank Nighswonger (3rd term)	1935–1936	
40	31		Robert E. Israel	1936–1937	
41	32		T. Walker Weaver	1937–1938	
42	33		Elmer R. Corn (1st term)	1938–1939	
43	34		Frank W. Coleman (1st term)	1939–1940	
44	(33)		Elmer R. Corn (2nd term)	1940–1941	
45	35		John I. Dotson	1941–1942	
46	36		Odom Farrell Sullivan	1942–1943	
47	37		Eugene Calendar Moriarty	1943–1944	
48	38		Herman William Beuttel	1944–1945	
49	39		Phil H. Manning	1945–1946	
50	(34)		Frank W. Coleman (2nd term)	1946–1947	
51	40		Charles S. Ritchie	1947–1948	
52	41		Louis August Donnell (1st term)	1948–1949	
53	42		William Christian Salome, Jr. (1st term)	1949–1950	
54	43		Earl K. Duke	1950–1951	
55	44		Floyd Throckmorton Amsden	1951–1952	
56	45		Frank Russell Jump	1952–1953	
57	46		Walter M. Keeler	1953–1954	
58	(42)		William Christian Salome Jr.	1954 (2nd term)	
59	(41)		Louis August Donnell (2nd term)	1954–1955	
60	47		Claude M. DeVorss	1955–1956	
61	48		Hugh David Lester	1956	
62	49		Alfred E. Howse	1956–1957	
63	50		Elzie E. Baird	1957–1958	
64	51		James L. Gardner	1958–1959	
65	52		Justus H. Fugate	1959–1960	
66	53		Levi Budd Rymph	1960–1961	
67	54		Herbert Piper Lindsley	1961–1962	
68	55		Carl A. Bell, Jr.	1962–1963	
69	56		Gerald F. Byrd	1963–1964	
70	57		Vincent L. Bogart	1964–1965	
71	58		William D. Tarrant	1965–1966	
72	59		John S. Stevens	1966–1967	
73	60		Clarence Eldert Vollmer	1967–1968	
74	61		William D. Anderson Jr.	1968–1969	
75	62		Donald K. Enoch	1969–1970	
76	63		A. Price Woodard Jr.	1970–1971	First African–American mayor.
77	64		Jack H. Greene	1971–1972	
78	65		Glenn J. "Jack" Shanahan	1972–1973	
79	66		James M. Donnell (1st term)	1973–1974	
80	67		Garry L. Porter	1974–1975	
81	68		Connie Ames Peters Kennard (1st term)	1975–1976	First woman commissioner and first woman mayor
82	(66)		James M. Donnell (2nd term)	1976–1977	
83	69		Antonio F. "Tony" Casado (1st term)	1977–1978	First Latino (Cuban) mayor of Wichita
84	(68)		Connie Ames Peters Kennard (2nd term)	1978–1979	
85	(69)		Antonio F. "Tony" Casado (2nd term)	1979–1980	
86	70		Robert G. Knight (1st term)	1980–1981	
87	71		Robert C. Brown (1st term)	1981–1982	
88	72		Albert J. Kirk	1982–1983	
89	73		Margalee Wright	1983–1984	
90	(70)		Robert G. Knight (2nd term)	1984– April 9, 1985	
x	x		Kathlien Edmiston (honorary)	April 9, 1985 – April 9, 1985	Edmiston was elected in a 3–1 vote to the City Commission on February 12, 1985 to serve the remaining two-month term through April 9 of commissioner Margalee Wright who resigned to serve on the Kansas Corporation Commission. Mayor Robert Knight resigned on April 2, 1985 in order for Edmiston to hold the office of mayor until the swearing of two new commissioners so that she might have the honor of serving as mayor. Knight was unaware that he was required to provide a week's notice making April 9 the earliest she could be sworn in, the same day the new commissioners took office. She was sworn in on April 9. After the newly elected commissioners were sworn in shortly after, a vote was held and Robert C. Brown was elected as the next mayor. Edmiston held the office of mayor for approximately 30 minutes.
91	(71)		Robert C. Brown (2nd term)	1985–1986	
92	(69)		Antonio F. "Tony" Casado (3rd term)	1986–1987	
93	(70)		Robert G. Knight (3rd term)	1987–1988	
94	74		Sheldon Kamen	1988–1989	
95	(70)		Robert G. Knight (4th term)	1989–1992	
96	75		Frank M. Ojile	1992–1993	
97	76		Elma Broadfoot	1993–1995	
98	(70)		Robert G. Knight (5th term)	1995–2003	
99	77		Carlos Mayans	2003–2007	2nd Latino (Cuban) mayor of Wichita
100	78		Carl Brewer	2007–2015	First elected African–American mayor
101	79		Jeff Longwell	2015–2020	
102	80		Brandon Whipple	2020–2024	
103	81		Lily Wu	2024–Present	First elected Asian-American mayor

== See also ==
- List of people from Wichita, Kansas
