= Lori Shultz =

American politician

Member of the Kansas House of Representatives from the 73rd district
- In office June 18, 2024 – January 13, 2025
- Preceded by: Les Mason
- Succeeded by: Rick Wilborn

Personal details
- Party: Republican
- Spouse: Clark Shultz
- Children: 3

Lori Shultz is an American politician who served as a Republican member of the Kansas House of Representatives for the 73rd district. She was nominated to fill the remainder of Les Mason's term following his death on June 3, 2024.

== Career ==
Shultz was nominated by Katie Sawyer to succeed Les Mason in the Kansas House of Representatives, and received a majority of the votes from precinct committee members on the first ballot. She cast her first (and only) votes of the term on June 18, 2024. As a representative, she represented all of McPherson County.

== Personal life ==
Shultz is the wife of former State Representative and current Lindsborg Mayor Clark Shultz. She lives in Lindsborg with her family.

Kansas House of Representatives
Preceded by Les Mason	Member of the Kansas House of Representatives for the 73rd District; June 18, 2024 - Present	Succeeded by Incumbent
