= T. J. Rose =

American politician

Member of the Kansas Senate from the 35th district
- Incumbent
- Assumed office January 13, 2025
- Preceded by: Rick Wilborn

Personal details
- Party: Republican
- Education: Kansas State University
- Occupation: Health insurance agent

T. J. Rose is an American politician from Kansas currently representing their 35th Senate district as a Republican.

== Biography ==
Rose attended the Shawnee Mission Northwest High School and graduated from Kansas State University. Prior to his election he worked as a secondary school mathematics teacher, mortgage underwriter, pastor, and at the time of his election was a health insurance agent. Rose ran unopposed in the Republican primaries to face off against Democrat Jason Anderson, beating Anderson with 52.8% of the vote.

Rose has called for Kansas Republican leaders to host a Convention of States against "federal overreach" by implementing an amendment to the United States Constitution for stringent term limits for both federal and state officials.

== Personal life ==
Rose is married and has six children.
