= Roy Ehrlich =

American politician

Member of the Kansas State Senate from the 35th District
- In office 1981–1992
- Preceded by: Jack Janssen
- Succeeded by: Don Steffes

Member of the Kansas House of Representatives from the 112th District
- In office 1973–1980

Member of the Kansas House of Representatives from the 109th District
- In office 1971–1972

Personal details
- Born: December 6, 1928 Hoisington, Kansas
- Died: November 28, 1997 Wichita, Kansas
- Party: Republican
- Spouse: Lila Jean Ochs (m. 1950)

Roy M. Ehrlich (December 6, 1928 – November 28, 1997) was an American politician who served as a Republican in the Kansas State Senate and Kansas House of Representatives from 1971 to 1992.

Ehrlich was born in Hoisington, Kansas and worked as a farmer and rancher. He was originally elected to the Kansas House from the 109th district in 1970, switching to the 112th district in 1972 after redistricting; he eventually served five full terms in the state House. In 1980, he ran for the 35th Senate district, and served three terms there. He was succeeded in the legislature by fellow Republican Don Steffes.
