= Steffes =

Steffes is a surname, occurring primarily in the United States. Notable people with the surname include:

- Don Steffes (1930–2018), American politician in Kansas
- Gary Steffes (born 1987), American ice hockey player
- Helen Filarski-Steffes (1924–2014), American baseball player
- Herbert Steffes (1904–1975), American jurist and judge in Milwaukee
- Josef Steffes-Mies (1940–2021), German rower
- Kent Steffes (born 1968), American beach volleyball player
- Martin Steffes-Mies (born 1967), German rower, son of Josef
- Peter Steffes (1907–c.1992), German cyclist
- Randy Steffes, Canadian musician and manager
