= List of state applications for an Article V Convention =

Of known applications made to the United States Congress

This is a list of known applications made to the United States Congress by the state legislatures for a Convention to propose amendments to the United States Constitution under Article V of the Constitution which provides in pertinent part:

The Congress, ..., on the Application of the Legislatures of two thirds of the several States, shall call a Convention for proposing Amendments ... which, ..., shall be valid to all Intents and Purposes, as Part of this Constitution, when ratified by the Legislatures of three fourths thereof, or by Conventions in three fourths thereof, as the one or the other Mode of Ratification may be proposed by the Congress.

A discussion on the history of this process can be found at Convention to propose amendments to the United States Constitution. In particular, theories as to the validity of rescission of applications may also be found there as well as in List of rescissions of Article V Convention applications. All known applications are listed here, noting if and when such an application was known to have been subsequently rescinded.

On January 6, 2015, the United States House of Representatives began the process of cataloging applications submitted to the House by the state legislatures with the adoption of a new provision in the House's parliamentary rules of procedure. Previously, all documents related to Article V Convention applications were administratively processed as memorials and only summarized in the House's portion of the Congressional Record and then referred to the House's Judiciary Committee. The Clerk of the House, on that office's webpage, has since listed some—but not all—applications and rescissions received by Congress' lower chamber since 1960. As this list may so easily be subsequently removed by a mere change in House rules, references to the actual Congressional Record are preferred. In its portion of the Congressional Record, the United States Senate, by contrast, typically publishes the entire verbatim text of a state legislature's application for an Article V Convention rather than to merely summarize the application's content. Once published verbatim in the Record, the Senate refers such memorials to its own Judiciary Committee.

The Congressional Record prior to 1876 is available through the Library of Congress, and online since 1995. In 1990, Judge Bruce Van Sickle and attorney Lynn M. Boughey compiled a list from the Congressional Record of state applications for an Article V Convention in the Hamline Law Review. Photocopies of the relevant sections of the Congressional Record have are available through Friends of the Article V Convention (FOAVC) for the gap in the electronically available Congressional Record.

== Van Sickle–Boughey classification ==
In "A Lawful and Peaceful Revolution", Van Sickle and Boughey define five classifications of applications:

- Class I: A call for a general convention, with no motivating issue listed
- Class II: A call for a general convention, with a separate statement of proposed amendment or explicit statement that the convention may consider other amendments proposed by states
- Class III: A call for a general convention tied to a proposed amendment
- Class IV: A call for a convention, with language aimed to limit the convention to the issue presented
- Class V: A call for a convention, with language to rescind the application from consideration for a convention if any other topic is to be covered

The following is added to this list, where the original text was not recorded in the Congressional Record:

- Class ??: A note of an application without the actual text

The following is also added to this list:

- Class VI: A call for Congress to propose an amendment, with no call for a convention

Van Sickle and Boughey indicate which applications have been rescinded by their state by encasing these in parentheses, and make no note of which applications have led to amendments proposed by Congress.

In the table below, the classification of rescinded applications are stricken, with the year of rescission given in parentheses and a link to the record of the rescission. Those applications which led to amendments proposed by Congress are listed in parentheses.

== List of state applications for an Article V convention ==
Although the table below has sortable columns, applications are initially arranged by date approved by the state legislature or by date of entry into the Congressional Record. Application classes are encased in parentheses if Congress presented an amendment on the topic given and stricken if the state legislature has subsequently rescinded its application. All descriptions with six or more states have identical amendment text, unless specified. As of March 2025, only the Hawaii State Legislature has never approved an Article V convention application through both its upper chamber and its lower chamber during the same legislative session.

State applications for an Article V convention (and rescissions thereof)
State	Issue / Topic	Date of approval by state's legislature	Receipt by Congress	Application classification (or year of application's rescission)
Virginia	Bill of Rights	November 14, 1788	AC V.1 258-259	~~(II)~~ 2004
New York	Bill of Rights	February 5, 1789	AC V.1 282; Text	(II)
Georgia	Clarify Amendment X	December 12, 1832	J HR V22.2 270-271	~~II~~ 2004
South Carolina	Clarify Amendment X	December 19, 1832	J HR V22.2 219-220	~~II~~ 2004
Alabama	Limitation on Tariffs	January 12, 1833	J HR V22.2 361-362	II
Indiana	General and Unlimited Article V Convention	March 13, 1861?	CG V.37.S 1465-6	I
Ohio	General and Unlimited Article V Convention	March 20, 1861	1861 Ohio Laws 181	I
New Jersey	Final Resolution for Slavery	February 1, 1861	CG V. 36.2 p. 681	(II)
Kentucky	Final Resolution for Slavery	February 5, 1861	CG V.36.2 p. 773	(II)
Illinois	Final Resolution for Slavery	February 28, 1861	CG V.36.2 p. 1270	(??)
Nebraska	Direct Election of Senators, Other	April 14, 1893	1893 Neb. Laws 466-7	III
Texas	General and Unlimited Article V Convention	June 5, 1899?	Cong. Rec. Vol. 33, p. 219 ("Concurrent resolution, S.C.R. No. 4")	~~(II)~~ 2017 TX 85th Legislature SJR 38
Minnesota	Direct Election of Senators, Other	February 13, 1901?	CR V.34 p.2561	(III)
Pennsylvania	Direct Election of Senators, II	February 13, 1901?	CR V.45 p.7118	(III)
Idaho	Direct Election of President, Vice-President and Senators	February 14, 1901?	CR V.45 p.7114	~~III~~ 1999
Montana	Direct Election of Senators, II; Direct Election of Senators, II	February 21, 1901? January 31, 1905?	CR V.35 p.208 CR V.39 p.2447	~~(III)~~ 2007; ~~(III)~~ 2007
Oregon	Direct Election of Senators, Other; Direct Election of Senators, I Direct Election of Senators, Other	February 23, 1901? March 10, 1903? January 26, 1909?	CR V.35 p.117 CR V.45 p.7118 CR V.43 p.2025	~~(III)~~ 2000; ~~(III)~~ 2000; ~~(III)~~ 2000
Tennessee	Direct Election of Senators, II; Direct Election of Senators, Other	March 27, 1901? March 14, 1905?	CR V.35 p.2344 CR V.45 p.7119	~~(III)~~ 2010; ~~(III)~~
Colorado	Direct Election of Senators, I	April 1, 1901?	CR V.45 p.7113	(II)
Michigan	Direct Election of Senators, Other	April 9, 1901?	CR V.35 p.117	(III)
Texas	Direct Election of Senators, I	April 17, 1901?	CR V.45 p.7119	(II)
Arkansas	Direct Election of Senators, Other	April 25, 1901?	CR V.45 p.7113	(III)
Kentucky	Direct Election of Senators, II	February 10, 1902?	CR V.45 p.7115	(III)
Illinois	Direct Election of Senators, I Direct Election of Senators, Other	February 10, 1903? May 23, 1907?	CR V.45 p.7114 CR V.42 p.164	(II) (III)
Nevada	Direct Election of Senators, II	February 25, 1903?	CR V.37 p.24	(III)
Utah	Direct Election of Senators, I	March 12, 1903?	CR V.45 p.7119	~~III~~ 2001
Washington	Direct Election of Senators, Other	March 12, 1903?	CR V.45 p.7119	(II)
Nebraska	Direct Election of Senators, I	March 25, 1903?	CR V.45 p.7116-7	(III)
Iowa	Direct Election of Senators, I	March 24, 1904?	CR V.38 p.4959	(III)
Missouri	Direct Election of Senators, II	March 18, 1905?	CR V.40 p.1905	(III)
South Dakota	Direct Election of Senators, Other; Direct Election of Senators, I	February 2, 1907? February 9, 1909?	CR V.41 p.1907 CR V.43 p.2667-2668	(III) (III)
Delaware	Anti-Polygamy	February 11, 1907?	CR V.41 p.3011	~~III~~ 2016
Missouri	General and Unlimited Article V Convention	March 6, 1907?	CR V.45 p.7116	I
Indiana	Direct Election of Senators, Other	March 11, 1907?	CR V.45 p.7114	(II)
Iowa	Direct Election of Senators, Other	March 12, 1907?	CR V.45 p.7114-5	(II)
Nevada	Direct Election of Senators, I	March 23, 1907?	CR V.42 p.163	(II)
New Jersey	Direct Election of Senators, I	May 28, 1907?	CR V.42 p.164	(III)
Louisiana	Direct Election of Senators, Other	November 25, 1907?	CR V.42 p.5906	~~(II)~~ 1990
Oklahoma	Direct Election of Senators, Other	January 20, 1908?	CR V.45 p.7117-8	~~(II)~~ 2009
South Dakota	Anti-Polygamy	February 6, 1909?	CR V.43 p.2670	III
Kansas	Direct Election of Senators, I	March 6, 1909?	CR V.45 p.7115	(II)
Wisconsin	Direct Election of Senators, I	May 31, 1910?	CR V.45 p.7119-20	(III)
Washington	Anti-Polygamy	September 1, 1910?	CR V.46 p.651	III
Montana	Direct Election of Senators, Other	January 20, 1911?	CR V.46 p.2411	~~(II)~~ 2007
Maine	Direct Election of Senators, Other	February 22, 1911?	Cong. Rec. Vol. 46, p. 4280 ("Joint resolution")	(III)
Tennessee	Anti-Polygamy	February 17, 1911?	Cong. Rec. Vol. 47, p. 187 ("Senate joint resolution 43")	~~III~~ 2010
Montana	Anti-Polygamy	March 1, 1911?	Cong. Rec. Vol. 47, pp. 98-99 ("House joint memorial 7") remainder of text p. 99	~~III~~ 2007
Nebraska	Anti-Polygamy	March 14, 1911?	Cong. Rec. Vol. 47, p. 99 ("Joint resolution by House and Senate of Nebraska Legislature")	III
Ohio	Anti-Polygamy	March 15, 1911?	Cong. Rec. Vol. 47, pp. 660-661 ("House joint resolution 13") remainder of text p. 661	III
Illinois	Prevent and Suppress Monopolies	May 11, 1911?	Cong. Rec. Vol. 47, p. 1298 ("House joint resolution 9")	III
Wisconsin	General and Unlimited Article V Convention	June 12, 1911?	Cong. Rec. Vol. 47, p. 1873 ("Joint resolution (J. Res. 15, S.)")	I
California	Direct Election of Senators, I	June 13, 1911?	CR V.47 p.2000	(??)
Vermont	Anti-Polygamy	December 18, 1912?	Cong. Rec. Vol. 49, p. 1433 ("Joint resolution")	III
Illinois	Anti-Polygamy	March 12, 1913?	Cong. Rec. Vol. 50, pp. 120-121 (Senate joint resolution 12") remainder of text p. 121	III
Oregon	Anti-Polygamy	January 20, 1913?	Cong. Rec. Vol. 49, p. 2463 ("Senate joint resolution 2")	~~III~~ 2000
Wisconsin	Anti-Polygamy	March 26, 1913?	Cong. Rec. Vol. 50, pp. 42-43 (No number, or resolution type, is given for this resolution) remainder of text p. 43 See, also, Cong. Rec. Vol. 50, p. 116	III
Missouri	Supreme Court Jurisdiction	April 15, 1913?	Cong. Rec. Vol. 50, p. 2428 ("House joint and concurrent resolution 23")	III
Michigan	Anti-Polygamy	July 2, 1913?	Cong. Rec. Vol. 50, p. 2290 ("House resolution No. 120")	III
South Carolina	Anti-Polygamy	February 15, 1915?	Cong. Rec. Vol. 53, p. 2442 ("Concurrent resolution")	~~III~~ 2004
Louisiana	Mode of Amendment, Other	January 12, 1920?	CR V.60 p.31	~~??~~ 1990
Nevada	Anti-Prohibition	December 7, 1925?	CR V.67 p.458	(??)
Wisconsin	Direct Election of President and VP	December 7, 1925?	CR V.67 p.458	(??)
Wisconsin	General and Unlimited Article V Convention	June 10, 1929	Cong. Rec. Vol. 71, p. 2590 ("Senate Joint Resolution 65")	(??)
Wisconsin	Article V Requirements Already Met for Convention Call	September 4, 1929?	Cong. Rec. Vol. 71, p. 3369 ("Senate Joint Resolution 83")	(??)
Wisconsin	Article V Requirements Already Met for Convention Call	September 23, 1929?	Cong. Rec. Vol. 71, p. 3856 ("Joint Resolution No. 83, S.")	(??)
Massachusetts	Anti-Prohibition	March 13, 1931?	Cong. Rec. Vol. 75, p. 45 ("Resolutions")	(III)
New York	Anti-Prohibition	December 8, 1931?	Cong. Rec. Vol. 75, p. 48 ("Assembly 4")	(IV)
Wisconsin	Anti-Prohibition	December 8, 1931?	Cong. Rec. Vol. 75, p. 57 ("Joint resolution")	(III)
New Jersey	Anti-Prohibition	February 1, 1932?	Cong. Rec. Vol. 75, p. 3299 ("Joint Resolution 1")	(III)
California	Tax on Government Securities	July 9, 1935?	Cong. Rec. Vol. 79, p. 10814 ("Senate joint resolution")	III
California	Federal Labor Laws	July 9, 1935?	Cong. Rec. Vol. 79, p. 10814 ("Senate Joint Resolution 23")	III
Oregon	General Welfare Act of 1937 ("Townsend National Recovery Plan")	February 1, 1939?	Cong. Rec. Vol. 84, p. 985 ("House Joint Memorial 1")	~~III~~ 2000
Wyoming	Income Tax, Limit II	March 8, 1939?	Cong. Rec. Vol. 84, pp. 2509-2510 ("House Joint Memorial 4") remainder of text p. 2510	~~III~~ 2009
Maryland	Income Tax, Limit II	March 27, 1939?	Cong. Rec. Vol. 84, p. 3320 ("House resolution") appearing to have been approved only by the Maryland House of Delegates—and NOT at all by the Maryland Senate	III
Rhode Island	Income Tax, Limit I	March 26, 1940?	Cong. Rec. Vol. 86, p. 3407 ("Resolution")	III
Iowa	Income Tax, Limit II	April 18, 1941?	Cong. Rec. Vol. 87, p. 3172 ("House Concurrent Resolution 15")	III
Maine	Income Tax, Limit I	April 17, 1941?	Cong. Rec. Vol. 87, pp. 3370-3371 ("Resolution") remainder of text p. 3371	~~III~~ 1953
Massachusetts	Income Tax, Limit I	April 29, 1941?	Cong. Rec. Vol. 87, pp. 3812-3813 ("Resolutions") remainder of text p. 3813	~~III~~ 1952
Michigan	Income Tax, Limit I	May 16, 1941?	Cong. Rec. Vol. 87, p. 4537 ("Senate Concurrent Resolution 20")	III
Iowa	Presidential Term Limits	March 26, 1943?	Cong. Rec. Vol. 89, p. 2516 ("House Concurrent Resolution 26")	(III)
Illinois	Presidential Term Limits	March 26, 1943?	Cong. Rec. Vol. 89, pp. 2516-2517 ("Senate Joint Resolution 8") remainder of text p. 2517	(III)
Michigan	Presidential Term Limits	April 6, 1943?	Cong. Rec. Vol. 89, p. 2944 ("Senate Concurrent Resolution 24")	(III)
New Hampshire	Income Tax, II	April 29, 1943?	Cong. Rec. Vol. 89, pp. 3761-3762 ("A concurrent resolution") remainder of text p. 3762	~~III~~ 2010
Delaware	Income Tax, Limit I	May 3, 1943?	Cong. Rec. Vol. 89, p. 4017 ("Senate Concurrent Resolution 6")	~~III~~ 2016
Illinois	Income Tax, Limit II	May 26, 1943?	Cong. Rec. Vol. 98, pp. 742-743 (HJR 32) remainder of text p. 743	~~III~~ 1952
Pennsylvania	Limited Funding Mandates, Various	May 27, 1943?	Cong. Rec. Vol. 89, p. 8220 ("Joint resolution")	III
Pennsylvania	Income Tax, Limit II	May 27, 1943?	CR V.89 pp.8220-8221 ("[House Concurrent resolution [No. 50]"]	III
Alabama	Income Tax, Limit I	July 8, 1943?	Cong. Rec. Vol. 89, pp. 7523-7524 ("House Joint Resolution 66") remainder of text p. 7524	III
Wisconsin	Income Tax, Limit I	September 14, 1943?	Cong. Rec. Vol. 89, p. 7524 ("Assembly Joint Resolution 55")	III
Wisconsin	Presidential Term Limits	September 14, 1943?	Cong. Rec. Vol. 89, p. 7525 ("Joint Resolution No. 38, A")	(III)
Kentucky	Income Tax, Limit I	March 20, 1944?	Cong. Rec. Vol. 90, pp. 4040-4041 ("House Resolution 79") remainder of text p. 4041	~~III~~ 1951
New Jersey	Income Tax, Limit I	February 25, 1944?	CR V.90 p.6141	~~III~~ 1954
California	World Federation	April 14, 1949?	Cong. Rec. Vol. 95, pp. 4568-4569 ("Assembly Joint Resolution 26") remainder of text p. 4569	IV
New Jersey	World Federation	April 14, 1949?	Cong. Rec. Vol. 95, p. 4571 ("Assembly Concurrent Resolution 17")	IV
North Carolina	World Federation	April 20, 1949?	Cong. Rec. Vol. 95, pp. 6587-6588 ("Resolution 37") remainder of text p. 6588	~~IV~~ 1953
Michigan	Revenue Sharing, II	May 5, 1949?	Cong. Rec. Vol. 95, pp. 5628-5629 (HCR 26) remainder of text p. 5629	IV
Florida	World Federation	May 16, 1949?	Cong. Rec. Vol. 95, p. 7000 ("Senate Memorial 282")	~~III~~ 2010
Nebraska	Revenue Sharing, II	May 25, 1949?	Cong. Rec. Vol. 95, pp. 7893-7894 ("Legislative Resolution 32") remainder of text p. 7894	~~IV~~ 1953
Connecticut	World Federation	June 1, 1949?	Cong. Rec. Vol. 95, p. 7689 ("Joint Resolution")	IV
Kansas	Income Tax, Limit I	March 28, 1951?	Cong. Rec. Vol. 97, p. 2936 (SCR 4)	III
Iowa	Revenue Sharing, II	April 17, 1951?	Cong. Rec. Vol. 97, pp. 3939-3940 (SCR 11) remainder of text p. 3940	IV
Florida	Income Tax, Limit I	May 10, 1951?	Cong. Rec. Vol. 97, pp. 5155-5156 (SCR 206) remainder of text p. 5156	~~III~~ 2010
Maine	Revenue Sharing, II	June 4, 1951?	Cong. Rec. Vol. 97, pp. 6033-6034 ("Joint Resolution") remainder of text p. 6034	IV
New Hampshire	Revenue Sharing, II	August 28, 1951?	Cong. Rec. Vol. 97, pp. 10716-10717 ("Concurrent Resolution") remainder of text p. 10717	~~IV~~ 2010
Arkansas	Income Tax, Limit II	February 4, 1952?	Cong. Rec. Vol. 98, p. 742 (SCR 10)	III
Utah	Income Tax, Limit I	February 11, 1952?	Cong. Rec. Vol. 98, p. 947 ("Joint Resolution")	~~III~~ 2001
New Mexico	Revenue Sharing, II	February 11, 1952?	Cong. Rec. Vol. 98, pp. 947-948 (HJR 12) p. 948	IV
Georgia	Limited Treaty Powers, Various	January 29, 1952?	CR V.98 p.1057	~~III~~ 2004
Georgia	Income Tax, Limit I	February 6, 1952?	CR V.98 p.1057	~~III~~ 2004
Indiana	Income Tax, Limit II; Income Tax, Limit II	February 18, 1952? March 12, 1957?	Cong. Rec. Vol. 98, pp. 1056-1057 (HCR 10) remainder of text p. 1057; Cong. Rec. Vol. 103, pp. 6474-6475 ("House Enrolled Concurrent Resolution 8") remainder of text p. 6475	III; III
Virginia	Income Tax, Limit I	February 21, 1952?	Cong. Rec. Vol. 98, p. 1496 (HJR 32)	~~III~~ 2004
California	Motor Vehicle Tax Distribution	April 16, 1952?	Cong. Rec. Vol. 98, pp. 4003-4004 (AJR 8) remainder of text p. 4004	III
Louisiana	Income Tax, Limit I	January 13, 1953?	Cong. Rec. Vol. 99, p. 320 ("Concurrent resolution") remainder of text p. 321	~~III~~ 1954
South Dakota	Mode of Amendment, Other; Mode of Amendment, by 12 States; Mode of Amendment, Identical Text	March 5, 1953? February 15, 1955? March 2, 1963?	Cong. Rec. Vol. 99, pp. 9180-9181 (SJR 4) remainder of text p. 9181; Cong. Rec. Vol. 101, pp. 2861-2862 (SJR 5) remainder of text p. 2862; Cong. Rec. Vol. 109, pp. 14638-14639 (SJR 1) remainder of text p. 14639	~~IV~~ 2010; ~~IV~~ 2010; ~~III~~ 2010
Illinois	Mode of Amendment, Other; Mode of Amendment, Identical Text	June 25, 1953? March 5, 1963?	Cong. Rec. Vol. 99, p. 9864 (HJR 37); Cong. Rec. Vol. 109, p. 3788 (SJR 4)	IV; III
Georgia	School Management, States' Right; School Management, States' Right; School Management, States' Right	January 31, 1955? February 5, 1959? March 4, 1965?	Cong. Rec. Vol. 101, p. 1532 ("Resolution"); Cong. Rec. Vol. 105, p. 1834 (HR 99); Cong. Rec. Vol. 111, p. 5817 (HR 128-212)	~~III~~ 2004; ~~III~~ 2004; ~~III~~ 2004
Texas	Mode of Amendment, by 12 States; Mode of Amendment, Identical Text	March 14, 1955? April 4, 1963?	Cong. Rec. Vol. 101, pp. 2770-2771 (SCR 15) remainder of text p. 2771; Cong. Rec. Vol. 109, p. 11852 (HCR 21)	~~(III)~~ 2017 TX 85th Legislature SJR 38 ~~(IV)~~ 2017 TX 85th Legislature SJR 38
Oklahoma	Income Tax, Limit Other	May 23, 1955?	Cong. Rec. Vol. 101, pp. 8397-8398 (SJR 15) remainder of text p. 8398 (referred to the Committee on Finance rather than to the Committee on the Judiciary)	~~III~~ 2009
Michigan	Mode of Amendment, by 12 States	April 4, 1956?	Cong. Rec. Vol. 102, pp. 7240-7241 (HCR 8) remainder of text p. 7241	IV
Idaho	Mode of Amendment, by 12 States	April 1, 1957?	Cong. Rec. Vol. 103 pp. 4831-4832 (HCR 6) remainder of text p. 4832	~~IV~~ 1999
Indiana	Mode of Amendment, by 12 States	March 12, 1957?	Cong. Rec. Vol. 103, pp. 6471-6472 ("House Enrolled Concurrent Resolution 2") remainder of text p. 6472	IV
Indiana	Limited Treaty Powers, Various	March 12, 1957?	Cong. Rec. Vol. 103, pp. 6472-6473 ("House Enrolled Concurrent Resolution 4") remainder of text p. 6473	III
Indiana	Proportional Electoral College, Other	March 12, 1957?	Cong. Rec. Vol. 103, pp. 6473-6474 ("House Enrolled Concurrent Resolution 7") remainder of text p. 6474	III
Indiana	Repeal of Constitution's 16th Amendment	March 12, 1957?	Cong. Rec. Vol. 103, pp. 6474-6475 ("House Enrolled Concurrent Resolution 8") remainder of text p. 6475	III
Indiana	Balanced Budget, Other; Balanced Budget, Other	March 12, 1957? January 26, 1976?	Cong. Rec. Vol. 103, pp. 6475-6476 ("House Enrolled Concurrent Resolution 9") remainder of text p. 6476; Cong. Rec. Vol. 122, p. 931 ("Concurrent Resolution")	III; III
Florida	Supreme Court Review, Other	June 5, 1957?	Cong. Rec. Vol. 103, p. 12787 (SCR 116)	~~III~~ 2010
Alabama	Judicial Term Limits	June 25, 1957?	Cong. Rec. Vol. 103, p. 10863 (SJR 47)	III
Connecticut	Prohibit Interstate Income Tax	May 6, 1958?	Cong. Rec. Vol. 104, pp. 8085-8086 (SJR 9) remainder of text p. 8086	III
Alabama	Limited Federal Preemption	January 1, 1959?	Cong. Rec. Vol. 105, p. 3083 (SJR 2)	III
Wyoming	Limit Federal Powers	February 26, 1959?	Cong. Rec. Vol. 105, pp. 3085-3086 ("Enrolled Joint Resolution 2") remainder of text p. 3086	~~III~~ 2009
Arkansas	Validity of 14th Amendment	March 18, 1959?	Cong. Rec. Vol. 105, p. 4398 (HCR 24)	III
Nevada	Limit Federal Powers	March 11, 1960?	Cong. Rec. Vol. 106, p. 10749 (SJR 7)	III
Louisiana	Limit Federal Powers	June 11, 1960?	Cong. Rec. Vol. 106, p. 14401 (HCR 22)	~~III~~ 1990
Arkansas	Supreme Court Review, Other	February 2, 1961?	Cong. Rec. Vol. 107, p. 2154 (HCR 14)	III
Wyoming	Balanced Budget, Other; Balanced Budget, Emergency	February 21, 1961? February 8, 1979?	Cong. Rec. Vol. 107, p. 2759 ("Enrolled Joint Resolution 4"); CR V.125 p.2116	~~III~~ 2009; ~~IV~~ 2009
Georgia	Supreme Court Review, Other	March 9, 1961?	Cong. Rec. Vol. 107, p. 4715 (SR 39)	~~III~~ 2004
South Carolina	Limit Federal Powers	March 11, 1962?	Cong. Rec. Vol. 108, p. 5051 ("Concurrent Resolution")	~~III~~ 2004
Oklahoma	Mode of Amendment, Identical Text	January 21, 1963?	Cong. Rec. Vol. 109, p. 1172 ("Enrolled Senate Concurrent Resolution 2")	~~III~~ 2009
Oklahoma	Apportionment of Legislature, I	January 21, 1963?	Cong. Rec. Vol. 109, pp. 1172-1173 ("Enrolled Senate Concurrent Resolution 3") remainder of text p. 1173	~~III~~ 2009
Kansas	Mode of Amendment, Identical Text	January 31, 1963?	Cong. Rec. Vol. 109, p. 2769 (SCR 3)	~~III~~ 1970
Kansas	Apportionment of Legislature, I	January 31, 1963?	Cong. Rec. Vol. 109, p. 2769 (SCR 4)	~~III~~ 1970
Florida	Supreme Court Review, Court of the Union	February 5, 1963?	Cong. Rec. Vol. 109, pp. 2071-2072 ("Senate Memorial 12-X(63)" remainder of text p. 2072	~~III~~ 2010
Florida	Mode of Amendment, Identical Text	February 5, 1963?	Cong. Rec. Vol. 109, p. 2072 ("Senate Memorial 13-X(63)"	~~III~~ 2010
Idaho	Apportionment of Legislature, I Apportionment of Legislature, II	February 14, 1963? January 26, 1965?	Cong. Rec. Vol. 109, p. 2281 (SJM 4); Cong. Rec. Vol. 111, p. 1229 (SJM 1)	~~III~~ 1999; ~~III~~ 1999
Arkansas	Mode of Amendment, Identical Text	February 21, 1963?	Cong. Rec. Vol. 109, p. 2768 (HJR 2)	III
Arkansas	Supreme Court Review, Court of the Union	February 21, 1963?	Cong. Rec. Vol. 109, pp. 2768-2769 (HJR 3) remainder of text p. 2769	III
Arkansas	Apportionment of Legislature, I Apportionment of Legislature, II	February 21, 1963? April 5, 1965?	Cong. Rec. Vol. 109, p. 2769 (HJR 4); Cong. Rec. Vol. 111, pp. 6917-6918 (SJR 1) remainder of text p. 6918	III; III
Arkansas	Proportional Electoral College, Other	February 21, 1963?	Cong. Rec. Vol. 109, p. 2769 (HJR 12)	III
South Dakota	Proportional Electoral College, Other	March 11, 1963?	CR V.109 p.3982	??
Montana	Apportionment of Legislature, I Apportionment of Legislature, II	March 11, 1963? February 17, 1965?	Cong. Rec. Vol. 109, p. 3854 (SJR 15); Cong. Rec. Vol. 111, p. 2777 ("A Joint Resolution")	~~III~~ 2007; ~~III~~ 2007
Idaho	Balanced Budget, Other	March 11, 1963?	Cong. Rec. Vol. 109, p. 3855 ("SJM 9")	~~III~~ 1999
Montana	Proportional Electoral College, I	March 25, 1963?	Cong. Rec. Vol. 109, p. 4469 ("HJR 13")	~~III~~ 2007
Wyoming	Supreme Court Review, Court of the Union	February 14, 1963?	Cong. Rec. Vol. 109 pp. 4778-4779 ("Enrolled Joint Resolution 2") remainder of text p. 4779	~~III~~ 2009
Wyoming	Apportionment of Legislature, I	February 9, 1963?	Cong. Rec. Vol. 109, p. 4779 ("Enrolled Joint Memorial 14")	~~III~~ 2009
Wyoming	Mode of Amendment, Identical Text	February 15, 1963?	Cong. Rec. Vol. 109, p. 4779 ("Enrolled Joint Memorial 15")	~~III~~ 2009
Alabama	Supreme Court Review, Court of the Union	March 13, 1963?	Cong. Rec. Vol. 109, p. 5250 (HJR 13)	III
Washington	Apportionment of Legislature, I	March 30, 1963?	Cong. Rec. Vol. 109, p. 5867 (HJM 1)	III
Missouri	Apportionment of Legislature, I Apportionment of Legislature, II	April 8, 1963? February 22, 1965?	Cong. Rec. Vol. 109, p. 5868 (HCR 4); Cong. Rec. Vol. 111, p. 3304 (HCR 2)	III; III
Missouri	Mode of Amendment, Identical Text	April 8, 1963?	Cong. Rec. Vol. 109, p. 5868 (HCR 5)	III
Utah	Proportional Electoral College, I	April 8, 1963?	Cong. Rec. Vol. 109, p. 5947 (HCR 1)	~~III~~ 2001
Colorado	Proportional Electoral College, I	April 11, 1963?	Cong. Rec. Vol. 109, p. 6659 (HJM 4)	III
Colorado	Income Tax, Limit Other	April 25, 1963?	Cong. Rec. Vol. 109, p. 7060 (SJM 9)	III
Nevada	Apportionment of Legislature, I	February 12, 1963? February 17, 1965?	Cong. Rec. Vol. 109, p. 9942 (SJR 2)	III
South Carolina	Apportionment of Legislature, I Apportionment of Legislature, II	June 10, 1963? February 18, 1965?	Cong. Rec. Vol. 109, p. 10441 ("House Concurrent Resolution"); Cong. Rec. Vol. 111, p. 3304 ("Concurrent Resolution")	~~III~~ 2004
South Carolina	Apportionment of Legislature, I	June 10, 1963?	Cong. Rec. Vol. 109, p. 10442 (SCR 149)	~~III~~ 2004
South Carolina	Mode of Amendment, Identical Text	June 10, 1963?	Cong. Rec. Vol. 109, p. 10441 ("House Concurrent Resolution")	~~III~~ 2004
South Carolina	Mode of Amendment, Identical Text	June 10, 1963?	Cong. Rec. Vol. 109, p. 10442 (SCR 148)	~~III~~ 2004
South Carolina	Supreme Court Review, Court of the Union	June 10, 1963?	Cong. Rec. Vol. 109, pp. 10441-10442 ("House Concurrent Resolution") remainder of text p. 10442	~~III~~ 2004
South Carolina	Supreme Court Review, Court of the Union	June 10, 1963?	Cong. Rec. Vol. 109, pp. 10442-10443 (SCR 147) remainder of text p. 10443	~~III~~ 2004
Texas	Apportionment of Legislature, I Apportionment of Legislature, II	April 4, 1963? July 26, 1965?	Cong. Rec. Vol. 109, p. 11852 (HCR 22); Cong. Rec. Vol. 111, p. 18171 (SCR 24)	~~(II)~~ 2017 TX 85th Legislature SJR 38; ~~(II)~~ 2017 TX 85th Legislature SJR 38
Texas	Proportional Electoral College, I	May 22, 1963?	Cong. Rec. Vol. 109, pp. 11852-11853 (HCR 29) remainder of text p. 11853	~~(II)~~ 2017 TX 85th Legislature SJR 38
South Dakota	Apportionment of Legislature, I Apportionment of Legislature, II	March 2, 1963? March 1, 1965?	Cong. Rec. Vol. 109, p. 14639 (SJR 2); Cong. Rec. Vol.111, pp.3722-3723 ("Joint resolution") remainder of text p. 3723	~~III~~ 2010; ~~III~~
Wisconsin	Proportional Electoral College, I	March 2, 1963?	Cong. Rec. Vol. 109, p. 14808 (Resolution Number Not Provided)	III
Virginia	Apportionment of Legislature, I Apportionment of Legislature, II	March 15, 1964? December 3, 1964?	Cong. Rec. Vol. 110, p. 5659 (HJR 90); Cong. Rec. Vol. 111, pp. 880-881 (HJR 6) remainder of text p. 881	~~III~~; ~~III~~ 2004
Massachusetts	School Management, Other	March 18, 1964?	Cong. Rec. Vol. 110, p. 7616 (Unnumbered resolution) appearing to have been approved only by the Massachusetts House of Representatives—and NOT at all by the Massachusetts Senate	III
Massachusetts	Senior Pensions	April 23, 1964?	Cong. Rec. Vol. 110, p. 9875 (Unnumbered resolution)	III
Virginia	Mode of Amendment, Identical Text	December 3, 1964?	Cong. Rec. Vol. 111, p. 880 (HJR 5)	~~III~~ 2004
Louisiana	School Management, States' Right	January 6, 1965?	Cong. Rec. Vol. 111, pp. 164-165 (SCR 3) remainder of text p. 165	~~III~~ 1990
Arizona	Apportionment of Legislature, II	February 18, 1965?	Cong. Rec. Vol. 111, p. 3061 (HCM 1)	~~III~~ 2003
Kansas	Apportionment of Legislature, II	January 27, 1965?	Cong. Rec. Vol. 111, pp. 3061-3062 (SCR 1) remainder of text p. 3062	~~III~~ 1970
South Carolina	School Management, States' Right	February 18, 1965?	CR V.111 p.3304	~~III~~ 2004
Utah	Apportionment of Legislature, II	March 8, 1965?	CR V.111 p.4320	~~III~~ 2001
Maryland	Apportionment of Legislature, II	March 25, 1965?	Cong. Rec. Vol. 111, p. 5820 (SJR 1)	III
North Carolina	Apportionment of Legislature, II	May 17, 1965?	Cong. Rec. Vol. 111, p. 10673 ("Resolution 60")	~~III~~ 1969-Not Joint
Minnesota	Apportionment of Legislature, II	May 17, 1965?	Cong. Rec. Vol. 111, p. 10673 ("Resolution 5")	III
Oklahoma	Proportional Electoral College, I	May 12, 1965?	Cong. Rec. Vol. 111, p. 11488 (SCR 35) also found at Cong. Rec. Vol. 111, pp. 11802-11803 ("Enrolled Senate Concurrent Resolution No. 35") remainder of text p. 11803	~~III~~ 2009
Louisiana	Apportionment of Legislature, II	June 1, 1965?	Cong. Rec. Vol. 111, p. 12110 (SCR 25)	~~III~~ 1990
New Hampshire	Apportionment of Legislature, II	June 8, 1965?	CR V.111 p.12853	~~III~~ 2010
Illinois	Revenue Sharing, Other	June 9, 1965?	CR V.111 p.14144	III
Florida	Apportionment of Legislature, II	June 22, 1965?	Cong. Rec. Vol. 111, p. 14308 (HM 2433)	~~III~~ 2010
Mississippi	Apportionment of Legislature, II	July 7, 1965?	Cong. Rec. Vol. 111, p. 15769 ("S. Con. Res. 101")	III
Mississippi	School Management, States' Right	July 7, 1965?	Cong. Rec. Vol. 111, pp. 15769-15770 ("S. Con. Res. 102") remainder of text p. 15770	III
Mississippi	Anti-Subversion	July 7, 1965?	Cong. Rec. Vol. 111, p. 15770 ("H. Con. Res. 14")	III
Illinois	Apportionment of Legislature, II; Apportionment of Legislature, Other	June 22, 1965; March 13, 1967	Cong. Rec. Vol. 111, p. 19379 ("Senate Resolution No. 52" and unicameral--not likewise approved by Illinois House of Representatives); Cong. Rec. Vol. 113, p. 8004 (HJR 32)	~~III~~ 1969-Not Joint; III
Nebraska	Proportional Electoral College, I	August 10, 1965?	CR V.111 p.19775	III
Nebraska	Apportionment of Legislature, I	September 22, 1965?	Cong. Rec. Vol. 111, p. 24723 ("Legislative Resolution")	III
Ohio	Revenue Sharing, Other	September 28, 1965?	Cong. Rec. Vol. 111, p. 25237 (SJR 16)	III
Kentucky	Apportionment of Legislature, II	October 6, 1965?	Cong. Rec. Vol. 111, pp. 26073-26074 ("Senate" Concurrent "Resolution 8") remainder of text p. 26074	III
Alabama	Apportionment of Legislature, II	January 14, 1966?	Cong. Rec. Vol. 112, pp. 200-201 (SJR 3) remainder of text p. 201	III
New Mexico	Apportionment of Legislature, II	January 14, 1966?	Cong. Rec. Vol. 112, p. 199 (SJR 2)	III
Tennessee	Apportionment of Legislature, II	January 14, 1966?	Cong. Rec. Vol. 112, p. 199-200 (HJR 34) remainder of text p. 200	~~III~~ 2010
Illinois	Apportionment of Legislature, Other	March 13, 1967	Cong. Rec. Vol. 113, p. 8004 (HJR 32)	III
Indiana	Apportionment of Legislature, II	March 13, 1967?	Cong. Rec. Vol. 113, p. 6384 ("House Enrolled Concurrent Resolution No. 58")	III
Alabama	Revenue Sharing, Other	April 19, 1967?	Cong. Rec. Vol. 113, pp. 10117-10118 ("Resolution No. 11") remainder of text p. 10118	III
North Dakota	Apportionment of Legislature, Other	April 28, 1967?	Cong. Rec. Vol. 113, p. 11175 (HCR I-1)	~~III~~ 2001
Georgia	Revenue Sharing, Other	May 4, 1967?	Cong. Rec. Vol. 113, pp. 11743-11744 ("Resolution 96") remainder of text p. 11744	~~III~~ 2004
Texas	Revenue Sharing, Other	June 28, 1967?	Cong. Rec. Vol. 113, p. 17634 (SCR 12)	~~(III)~~ 2017 TX 85th Legislature SJR 38
Illinois	Revenue Sharing, Other	June 28, 1967?	Cong. Rec. Vol. 113, p. 17634-17635 (SJR 63) remainder of text p. 17635	~~III~~ 1969-Not Joint
Iowa	Apportionment of Legislature, Other	May 13, 1969?	Cong. Rec. Vol. 115, p. 12249 (SCR 13)	III
Florida	Revenue Sharing, Other	September 3, 1969?	Cong. Rec. Vol. 115, p. 24116 (SM 397)	~~III~~ 2010
New Hampshire	Revenue Sharing, I	December 1, 1969?	Cong. Rec. Vol. 115, p. 36153-36154 ("Concurrent resolution..." remainder of text p. 36154	~~III~~ 2010
Mississippi	School Management, Other; School Management, No Assignment	March 5, 1970? March 15, 1973?	Cong. Rec. Vol. 113, p. 6097 (SCR 514); Cong. Rec. Vol. 119, p. 8089 (HCR 55)	III; IV
Louisiana	Anti-Subversion	June 22, 1970?	Cong. Rec. Vol. 116, pp. 20672-20673 (HCR 4-A) remainder of text p. 20673	~~III~~ 1990
Louisiana	Income Tax, Limit Other	July 7, 1970?	Cong. Rec. Vol. 116, p. 22906 (SCR 25)	~~III~~ 1990
Louisiana	Revenue Sharing, Other	July 10, 1970?	Cong. Rec. Vol. 116, p. 23765 (HCR 270)	~~III~~ 1990
New Jersey	Revenue Sharing, I	December 16, 1970?	Cong. Rec. Vol. 116, p. 41879 (SCR 77)	IV
West Virginia	Revenue Sharing, I	January 26, 1971?	Cong. Rec. Vol. 117, pp. 541-542 (HCR 9) remainder of text p. 542	IV
Massachusetts	Revenue Sharing, I	March 4, 1971?	Cong. Rec. Vol. 117, p. 5020 (Unnumbered resolution)	IV
South Dakota	Revenue Sharing, I	March 8, 1971?	Cong. Rec. Vol. 117, p. 5303 (HJR 503)	IV
North Dakota	Revenue Sharing, I	April 26, 1971?	Cong. Rec. Vol. 117, p. 11841 (SCR 4013)	~~IV~~ 2001
Louisiana	Revenue Sharing, I	June 15, 1971?	Cong. Rec. Vol. 117, pp. 19801-19802 (SCR 138) remainder of text p. 19802	~~IV~~ 1990
Ohio	Revenue Sharing, I	June 28, 1971?	Cong. Rec. Vol. 117, p. 22280 ("Joint Resolution")	IV
Delaware	Revenue Sharing, I	February 18, 1971?	CR V.117 p.3175	~~??~~ 2016
Oregon	Revenue Sharing, I	May 24, 1971?	CR V.117 p.16574	??
Massachusetts	School Management, Other; School Management, Other	September 8, 1971? March 28, 1973?	Cong. Rec. Vol. 117, p. 30905 (Unnumbered resolution); CR Vol. 119, pp. 12408-12409 (Unnumbered resolution) remainder of text p. 12409	IV; IV
Michigan	School Management, No Assignment	November 16, 1971?	CR V.117 pp.41598-41599 (SCR 172) Printed in "Extensions of Remarks" portion of Congressional Record remainder of text p. 41599	IV
Iowa	Revenue Sharing, I	March 2, 1972?	Cong. Rec. Vol. 118, pp. 6501-6502 (HJR 1) remainder of text p. 6502	IV
Florida	Senate Control of Presiding Officer	April 4, 1972?	Cong. Rec. Vol. 118, p. 11444 (SM 227)	~~IV~~ 2010
Arizona	School Management, Prayer	April 4, 1972?	Cong. Rec. Vol. 118, p. 11445 (HCR 2009)	~~III~~ 2003
Tennessee	School management, No Assignment	May 8, 1972?	CR V.118 p.16214	~~??~~ 2010
New York	School Management, Other	October 2, 1972?	Cong. Rec. Vol. 118, pp. 33047-33048 ("Joint Resolution No. 7) remainder of text p. 33048	IV
Virginia	Balanced Federal Budget	March 15, 1973? March 10, 1975? March 29, 1976?	Cong. Rec. Vol. 119, p. 8091 (HJR 75); CR Vol. 121, p. 5793 (SJR 107); CR Vol. 122, pp. 8335-8336 (SJR 36) remainder of text p. 8336	>~~IV~~; ~~III~~; ~~IV~~ 2004
Mississippi	Prayer in Public Buildings	March 20, 1973?	Cong. Rec. Vol. 119, p. 8689 (HCR 14)	IV
Virginia	School management, No Assignment	April 3, 1973?	CR V.119 p.10675	~~??~~ 2004
New Jersey	School Management, Other	April 9, 1973?	CR V.119 p.11446	??
Texas	School Management, No Assignment	April 10, 1973?	Cong. Rec. Vol. 119, p. 11515 ("House Concurrent Resolution")	~~(IV)~~ 2017 TX 85th Legislature SJR 38
Oklahoma	School Management, No Assignment	April 25, 1973?	Cong. Rec. Vol. 119, p. 14428 (HCR 1026)	~~III~~ 2009
Maryland	School Management, Other	May 7, 1973?	CR V.119 p.14421	??
Nevada	School Management, No Assignment	May 29, 1973?	Cong. Rec. Vol. 119, pp. 17022-17023 (SJR 7) remainder of text p. 17023	IV
New Hampshire	School Management, Other	June 5, 1973?	CR V.119 p.18190	~~??~~ 2010
Arkansas	Balanced Federal Budget	March 10, 1975? March 8, 1979?	Cong. Rec. Vol. 121, p. 5793 ("Senate Concurrent Resolution"); CR Vol. 125, p. 4372, POM-78 (HJR 1)	III; IV
North Dakota	Balanced Federal Budget	March 11, 1975?	Cong. Rec. Vol. 125, p. 9782, POM-205 (Senate Concurrent Resolution No. 4018) The wording of S.C.R. No. 4018 is extremely poor and—depending upon interpretation—it might not even be a valid Article V Convention call	~~II~~ 2001
Mississippi	Balanced Federal Budget	April 29, 1975?	Cong. Rec. Vol. 121, pp. 12175-12176 (HCR 51) remainder of text p. 12176	III
Missouri	Right to Life, Various	May 5, 1975?	Cong. Rec. Vol. 121, p. 12867 (SCR 7)	III
Nevada	Limited Funding Mandates, Various	June 26, 1975?	Cong. Rec. Vol. 121, p. 21065 (AJR 47)	III
Louisiana	Balanced Federal Budget	July 28, 1975? February 8, 1979? July 19, 1979?	Cong. Rec. Vol. 121, p. 25312 (SCR 109); CR V.125 p.2110-1 Cong. Rec. Vol. 125, pp. 19470-19471, POM-394 (SCR 4) remainder of text p. 19471	~~III~~ 1990; ~~IV~~ 1990; ~~V~~ 1990
Kentucky	School Management, No Assignment	September 8, 1975?	Cong. Rec. Vol. 121, p. 27821 ("House" Joint "Resolution No. 29")	III
Alabama	Balanced Federal Budget	September 10, 1975?	Cong. Rec. Vol. 121, p. 28347 (HJR 105)	~~IV~~ 1989
Georgia	Balanced Federal Budget	February 6, 1976?	Cong. Rec. Vol. 122, p. 2740 (HR 469-1267)	~~IV~~ 2004
Delaware	Balanced Federal Budget	February 25, 1976?	Cong. Rec. Vol. 122, p. 4329 (HCR 36)	~~IV~~ 2016
South Carolina	Balanced Federal Budget	February 25, 1976? February 8, 1979?	Cong. Rec. Vol. 122, p. 4329 (Numerically Undesignated Resolution); CR V.125 p.2114	~~IV~~ 2004; ~~IV~~ 2004
Massachusetts	School Management, No Assignment	April 7, 1976?	Cong. Rec. Vol. 122, p. 9735, (Unnumbered resolution)	III
Oklahoma	Limited Funding Mandates, Various	June 7, 1976?	CR V.122 p.16814	III
Louisiana	Right to Life, Various	July 22, 1976?	CR V.122 p.23550	~~IV~~ 1990
Alabama	Balanced Federal Budget	August 18, 1976?	Cong. Rec. Vol. 125, p. 4861, POM-91 (House Joint Resolution No. 227)	
Delaware	Right to Life, Various	January 1, 1977?	Cong. Rec. Vol. 124, p. 17055, POM-687 (House Concurrent Resolution No. 9)	~~III~~ 2016
Maryland	Balanced Federal Budget	January 28, 1977?	Cong. Rec. Vol. 123, pp. 2545-2546, POM-59 (Senate Joint Resolution No. 4—also known as "Resolution No. 77") remainder of text p. 2546	~~IV~~ 2017
Virginia	Line Item Veto, Various	March 28, 1977?	CR V.123 p.9289 (1977 House Joint Resolution No. 168)	~~??~~ 2004
New Jersey	Right to Life, Various	April 5, 1977?	Cong. Rec. Vol. 123, p. 10481, POM-124 ("Senate No. 1271")	IV
South Dakota	Right to Life, Unborn; Right to Life, Sacred Life	April 18, 1977? April 18, 1980?	Cong. Rec. Vol. 123, p. 11048, POM-135 (HJR 503)	~~IV~~ 2010
Utah	Right to Life, Various	May 2, 1977?	Cong. Rec. Vol. 123, pp. 13057-13058, POM-151 (HJR 28) remainder of text p.13058	~~III~~ 2001
Arkansas	Right to Life, Various	May 20, 1977?	Cong. Rec. Vol. 123, pp. 15808-15809, POM-189 (HJR 2) remainder of text p. 15809	IV
Rhode Island	Right to Life, Various	May 20, 1977?	Cong. Rec. Vol. 123, p. 15809, POM-190 ("Resolution")	IV
Texas	Balanced Federal Budget	May 30, 1977?	Cong. Rec. Vol. 125, pp. 5223-5224, POM-95 (HCR 31) remainder of text p. 5224	IV
Arizona	Balanced Federal Budget	June 14, 1977?	Cong. Rec. Vol. 123, pp. 18873-18874, POM-231 (HCM 2003) remainder of text p. 18874	~~III~~ 2003
Oregon	Balanced Federal Budget	June 16, 1977?	Cong. Rec. Vol. 125, p. 5953, POM-104 (Senate Joint Memorial No. 2)	~~IV~~ 2000
Massachusetts	Right to Life, Various	June 23, 1977?	CR V.123 p.20659	??
Indiana	Right to Life, Various	July 22, 1977?	CR V.123 p.4797	
Delaware	Appointment and Tenure of Federal Judges	January 1, 1978?	Cong. Rec. Vol. 124, p. 2193, POM-453 (Senate Concurrent Resolution No. 79)	~~III~~ 2016
Colorado	Balanced Federal Budget	April 5, 1978?	Cong. Rec. Vol. 124, p. 8778, POM-579 (Senate Joint Memorial No. 1)	V
Nebraska	Right to Life, Various	April 21, 1978?	Cong. Rec. Vol. 124, p. 12694, POM-637 (Legislative Resolution No. 152)	IV
Tennessee	Judicial Term Limits	April 25, 1978?	Cong. Rec. Vol. 124, p. 11437, POM-612 (HJR 21)	~~III~~ 2010
Tennessee	Balanced Federal Budget	April 25, 1978?	Cong. Rec. Vol. 124, pp. 11437-11438, POM-613 (HJR 22) remainder of text p. 11438	~~III~~ 2010
Pennsylvania	Right to Life, Various	April 25, 1978?	Cong. Rec. Vol. 124, p. 11438, POM-614 (House Bill No. 71--described as a "Joint Resolution")	IV
Oklahoma	Balanced Federal Budget	May 3, 1978?	Cong. Rec. Vol. 124, p. 12397 (POM-629) (HJR 1049)	~~IV~~ 2009
Kansas	Balanced Federal Budget	May 19, 1978?	Cong. Rec. Vol. 124, p. 14584, POM-657 (SCR 1661)	IV
Louisiana	Balanced Federal Budget	July 14, 1978?	[Cong. Rec. Vol. 124, pp. 20911-20912, POM-739 (Senate Concurrent Resolution No. 73)]	
North Carolina	Balanced Federal Budget	January 29, 1979?	Cong. Rec. Vol. 125, p. 1923, POM-37 (Senate Joint Resolution No. 1—also known as Resolution No. 5)	??
Mississippi	Right to Life, Various	February 26, 1979?	Cong. Rec. Vol. 125, p. 3196, POM-49 (HCR 3)	IV
Florida	Balanced Federal Budget	March 1, 1979? June 21, 1988?	Cong. Rec. Vol. 125, p. 3655, POM-59 ("Senate Memorial" No. 234); Cong. Rec. Vol. 125, pp. 3655-3656, POM-60 (HM 2801) remainder of text p. 3656; Cong. Rec. Vol. 134, p. 15363, POM-549 (SM 302)	~~IV~~ 1988; ~~VI~~ 2010
Idaho	Balanced Federal Budget	March 1, 1979?	Cong. Rec. Vol. 125, p. 3657, POM-64 (HCR 7)	~~V~~ 1999
New Mexico	Balanced Federal Budget	March 1, 1979?	Cong. Rec. Vol. 125, pp. 3656-3657, POM-62 (SJR 1) remainder of text p. 3657	IV
South Dakota	Balanced Federal Budget	March 1, 1979?	Cong. Rec. Vol. 125, p. 3656, POM-61 (SJR 1)	~~V~~ 2010
Nebraska	Balanced Federal Budget	March 7, 1979?	Cong. Rec. Vol. 125, p. 4152, POM-67 (Legislative Resolution No. 106)	IV
Georgia	Right to Life, Various	March 8, 1979?	Cong. Rec. Vol. 125, p. 4372, POM-79 (House Resolution No. 254) The wording of H.R. No. 254 indicates that it was adopted only by the Georgia House of Representatives—therefore, it cannot be a valid Article V Convention call	~~IV~~ 2004
Utah	Balanced Federal Budget	March 8, 1979?	Cong. Rec. Vol. 125, pp. 4372-4373, POM-80 (HJR 12)	~~III~~ 2001
Arizona	Balanced Federal Budget	March 9, 1979	Cong. Rec. Vol. 125, pp. 7920-7921, POM-149 (Senate Joint Resolution No. 1002)	~~III~~ 2003
Pennsylvania	Balanced Federal Budget	March 12, 1979?	Cong. Rec. Vol. 125, p. 4627-4628, POM-85 (House Concurrent "Resolution No. 236")	IV
Arizona	Repeal Constitution's 16th Amendment and Prohibit Federal Government from Engaging in Business, Professional, Commercial, Financial or Industrial Enterprises	April 18, 1979	Cong. Rec. Vol. 125, p. 122201 POM-244 (House Joint Memorial No. 2001)	V
Indiana	Balanced Federal Budget	May 1, 1979?	Cong. Rec. Vol. 125, p. 9188, POM-192 ("Senate Enrolled Joint Resolution No. 8")	IV
New Hampshire	Balanced Federal Budget	May 16, 1979?	Cong. Rec. Vol. 125 p. 11584, POM-223 (HCR 8)	~~IV~~ 2010
Iowa	Balanced Federal Budget	June 18, 1979?	Cong. Rec. Vol. 125, p. 15227, POM-301 (SJR 1)	IV
Nevada	Right to Life, Various	June 25, 1979?	Cong. Rec. Vol. 125, p. 16350, POM-312 (SJR 27)	V
Louisiana	Federal Executive Branch Rules and Regulations	July 17, 1979?	[Cong. Rec. Vol. 125, p. 18954, POM-383 (Senate Concurrent Resolution No. 105)]	~~??~~ 1990
Nevada	Balanced Federal Budget	January 29, 1980?	Cong. Rec. Vol. 126, pp. 1104-1105, POM-535 (SJR 8) remainder of text p. 1105	III; ~~V~~ 1989-Not Joint
Idaho	Right to Life, Various	March 21, 1980?	Cong. Rec. Vol. 126, p. 6172, POM-602 (SCR 132)	~~V~~ 1999
Arizona	Coercive use of Federal Funds	April 17, 1980	Cong. Rec. Vol. 126, p. 11389, POM-730, (House Concurrent Resolution No. 2001)	~~III~~ 2003
Oklahoma	Right to Life, Various	April 24, 1980?	Cong. Rec. Vol. 126, p. 8972, POM-701 (HJR 1053)	~~IV~~ 2009
Tennessee	Right to Life, Various	May 2, 1980?	Cong. Rec. Vol. 126, p. 9765, POM-712 (SJR 23)	~~IV~~ 2010
Alabama	Right to Life, Various	May 8, 1980?	Cong. Rec. Vol. 126, p. 10650, POM-717 (SJR 9)	IV
Alabama	Require Federal Judges to be elected, or re-elected, every six years, rather than to be appointed	August 13, 1981	Cong. Rec. Vol. 127, p. 20491 as well as p. 21684, POM-416 (Senate Joint Resolution No. 41)	V
Alaska	Balanced Federal Budget	January 18, 1982?	Cong. Rec. Vol. 128, p. 2278 as well as p. 5643, POM-706 (House Joint Resolution No. 17—also designated as Legislative Resolve No. 1)	V
Missouri	Balanced Federal Budget	July 21, 1983?	Cong. Rec. Vol. 129, p. 20352, POM-323 (SCR 3)	V
Arizona	Line Item Veto, Various	June 5, 1984?	Cong. Rec. Vol. 130, p. 15611, POM-684 (SCR 1008)	~~III~~ 2003
South Dakota	Line Item Veto, Various	March 12, 1986?	Cong. Rec. Vol. 132, pp. 4473-4474, POM-599, (Senate Joint Resolution No. 4) remainder of text p. 4474	~~V~~ 2010
Utah	Income Tax, Limit Other	February 23, 1987	Cong. Rec. Vol. 133, p. 9736, POM-94 (SJR 8)	~~III~~ 2001
South Dakota	Term Limits on Members of Congress	April 4, 1989?	Cong. Rec. Vol. 135, pp. 5395-5396, POM-42 (HJR 1001) remainder of text p. 5396	~~IV~~ 2010
Georgia	Flag Desecration	April 16, 1991?	Cong. Rec. Vol. 137, pp. 8085-8086, POM-26 (House "Resolution No. 105") remainder of text p. 8086	~~IV~~ 2004
Colorado	Limited Funded Mandates, Various	June 26, 1992?	Cong. Rec. Vol. 138, p. 16552, POM-428 (SJM 92-3)	V
South Dakota	Limited Funded Mandates, Various	March 22, 1993?	Cong. Rec. Vol. 139, p. 5905, POM-50 (SJR 3)	~~V~~ 2010
Missouri	No Judicial Taxing Power	June 29, 1993?	Cong. Rec. Vol. 139, p. 14565, POM-175 (SCR 9)	V
Delaware	Income Tax, Limit Other	June 28, 1994?	Cong. Rec. Vol. 140, p. 14718, POM-554 (HCR 56)	~~IV~~ 2016
Missouri	Limited Funding Mandates, Various	June 29, 1994?	Cong. Rec. Vol. 140, pp. 15072-15073, POM-575 (SCR 21) remainder of text p. 15073	V
Arizona	No Judicial Taxing Power	March 27, 1996?	Cong. Rec. Vol. 142, pp. S3012-S3013, POM-523 (SCR 1014) remainder of text p. S3013	~~III~~ 2003
South Dakota	No Judicial Taxing Power	March 27, 1996?	Cong. Rec. Vol. 142, p. S3013, POM-526 (HCR 1010)	III
Nevada	Term Limits on Members of Congress	June 29, 1996?	Nevada Constitution	III
North Dakota	No Judicial Taxing Power	April 6, 2001?	Cong. Rec. Vol. 147, pp. S3704-S3705, POM-7 ("House Concurrent Resolution No. 3031") remainder of text p. S3705	III
Louisiana	Posse Comitatus	April 29, 2008?	Cong. Rec. Vol. 154, p. S3504, POM-329 ("House Concurrent Resolution No. 38")	IV
Florida	Balanced Federal Budget	April 19, 2010	Cong. Rec. Vol. 160, pp. S5563-S5564, POM-323 ("Senate Concurrent Resolution 10") remainder of text p. S5564	V
Nebraska	Balanced Federal Budget (Reaffirmation of 1976 Legislative Resolution No. 106)	April 13, 2010	"Legislative Resolution No. 538"	V
North Dakota	Mode of Amendment, Other	April 14, 2011	"House Concurrent Resolution No. 3048"	V
North Dakota	Increase in federal debt to require approval by majority of state legislatures	April 11, 2011	Cong. Rec. Vol. 158, p. S1459, POM-66 ("Senate Concurrent Resolution No. 4007")	IV
Alabama	Balanced Federal Budget	June 1, 2011	Cong. Rec. Vol. 160, pp. S3666-S3667, POM-251 ("Senate Joint Resolution No. 100") remainder of text p. S3667	V
Louisiana	Increase in federal debt to require approval by majority of state legislatures	June 21, 2011	Cong. Rec. Vol. 158, p. S2241, POM-69 ("House Concurrent Resolution No. 87")	IV
New Hampshire	Balanced Federal Budget	May 16, 2012	Cong. Rec. Vol. 162, p. S5153, POM-197 ("House Concurrent Resolution 40")	V
Ohio	Balanced Federal Budget	November 20, 2013	Cong. Rec. Vol. 160, p. S1174, POM-197 Senate Joint Resolution No. 5 also known as simply "Joint Resolution No. 5")	V
Georgia	Balanced Federal Budget	February 20, 2014	Cong. Rec. Vol. 160, pp. S3667-S3668, POM-254 ("Senate Resolution 371") remainder of text p. S3668	V
Georgia	Fiscal restraints on the federal government, limiting the power and jurisdiction of the federal government, and limiting the terms of office of federal officials, including members of Congress	March 6, 2014	Cong. Rec. Vol. 160, p. S4332, POM-285 ("Senate Resolution No. 736")	V
Michigan	Balanced Federal Budget	March 26, 2014	Cong. Rec. Vol. 163, p. S2098, POM-14 ("Enrolled Senate Joint Resolution V")	V
Tennessee	Balanced Federal Budget	April 9, 2014	Cong. Rec. Vol. 165, p. S5406, POM-128 ("House Joint Resolution No. 548")	V
Alaska	Fiscal restraints on the federal government, limiting the power and jurisdiction of the federal government, and limiting the terms of office of federal officials, including members of Congress	April 19, 2014	Cong. Rec. Vol. 160, p. S6021, POM-345 ("House Joint Resolution 22", also referred to as "Legislative Resolve No. 68")	V
Florida	Fiscal restraints on the federal government, limiting the power and jurisdiction of the federal government, and limiting the terms of office of federal officials, including members of Congress	April 21, 2014	Cong. Rec. Vol. 160, p. S4332, POM-286 ("Senate Memorial 476")	V
Florida	Balanced Federal Budget	April 21, 2014	Cong. Rec. Vol. 160, p. S4333, POM-288 ("Senate Memorial 658")	V
Florida	Legislation in Congress to contain only one subject and that one subject must be clearly expressed in the measure's title	April 23, 2014	Cong. Rec. Vol. 160, p. S4333, POM-289 ("House Memorial 261")	V
Vermont	Regulation of election campaign donations and expenditures; end legal concept of "corporate personhood"; overturn 2010 U.S. Supreme Court decision in case of Citizens United v. Federal Election Commission	May 2, 2014	Cong. Rec. Vol. 160, p. S4331, POM-284 ("Joint Senate Resolution No. 27")	V
Louisiana	Balanced Federal Budget	May 15, 2014	Cong. Rec. Vol. 160, p. S5563, POM-322 ("House Concurrent Resolution No. 70")	V
California	Regulation of election campaign donations and expenditures; end legal concept of "corporate personhood"; overturn 2010 U.S. Supreme Court decision in case of Citizens United v. Federal Election Commission	June 23, 2014	Cong. Rec. Vol. 160, p. S5507, POM-320 ("Assembly Joint Resolution No. 1")	V
Illinois	Regulation of election campaign donations and expenditures; end legal concept of "corporate personhood"; overturn 2010 U.S. Supreme Court decision in case of Citizens United v. Federal Election Commission	December 3, 2014	Cong. Rec. Vol. 162, p. S71, POM-126 ("Senate Joint Resolution No. 42")	V
South Dakota	Balanced Federal Budget	February 17, 2015	Cong. Rec. Vol. 162, p. S6550, POM-255 ("House Joint Resolution No. 1001")	V
New Jersey	Regulation of election campaign donations and expenditures; end legal concept of "corporate personhood"; overturn 2010 U.S. Supreme Court decision in case of Citizens United v. Federal Election Commission	February 23, 2015	"Senate Concurrent Resolution No. 132"	V
Utah	Balanced Federal Budget	March 6, 2015	"House Joint Resolution No. 7"	V
North Dakota	Balanced Federal Budget	March 24, 2015	Cong. Rec. Vol. 161, pp. S2399-S2400, POM-17 ("House Concurrent Resolution 3015") remainder of text p. S2400	V
Alabama	Fiscal restraints on the federal government, limiting the power and jurisdiction of the federal government, and limiting the terms of office of federal officials, including members of Congress	May 21, 2015	Cong. Rec. Vol. 161 pp. S8601-S8602, POM-124 ("House Joint Resolution 112")	V
Tennessee	Fiscal restraints on the federal government, limiting the power and jurisdiction of the federal government, and limiting the terms of office of federal officials, including members of Congress	February 4, 2016	Cong. Rec. Vol. 163, p. S6534, POM-117 ("Senate Joint Resolution No. 67")	V
Florida	Term limits on Members of Congress	February 10, 2016	Cong. Rec. Vol. 163, p. S112, POM-6 ("House Memorial 417")	V
Indiana	Fiscal restraints on the federal government, limiting the power and jurisdiction of the federal government, and limiting the terms of office of federal officials, including members of Congress	February 29, 2016	Cong. Rec. Vol. 162, p. S6663, POM-256 ("Senate Enrolled Joint Resolution No. 14")	V
West Virginia	Balanced Federal Budget	March 12, 2016	Cong. Rec. Vol. 162, p. S5277, POM-201 and POM-202 ("House Concurrent Resolution 36")	V
Alaska	Countermand Amendment, which would allow states to propose initiatives that could repeal any federal statute, executive order, judicial decision, or regulatory decision if three-fifths of state legislatures approved.	April 16, 2016	Cong. Rec. Vol. 164, p. S703, POM-164 ("House Joint Resolution No. 14", also referred to as "Legislative Resolve No. 49")	V
Oklahoma	Combination of: (1) Balanced Federal Budget; and (2) Fiscal restraints on the federal government, limiting the power and jurisdiction of the federal government, and limiting the terms of office of federal officials, including members of Congress	April 18, 2016	Cong. Rec. Vol. 162, pp. S6354-6355, POM-213 ("Senate Joint Resolution No. 4") remainder of text p. S6355	V
Louisiana	Fiscal restraints on the federal government, limiting the power and jurisdiction of the federal government, and limiting the terms of office of federal officials, including members of Congress	May 25, 2016	"Senate Concurrent Resolution No. 52"	V
Rhode Island	Regulation of election campaign donations and expenditures; end legal concept of "corporate personhood"; overturn 2010 U.S. Supreme Court decision in case of Citizens United v. Federal Election Commission (Rhode Island lawmakers chose to approve two separate unicameral resolutions, rather than to adopt a single bicameral resolution. The validity of this approach is subject to question).	June 16, 2016 (R.I. House version) and June 17, 2016 (R.I. Senate version)	Cong. Rec. Vol. 162, p. S5276, POM-198 (R 326—H 7670) and Cong. Rec. Vol. 162, pp. S5276-S5277, POM-199 (R 327—S 2589) remainder of text p. S5277	V
Wyoming	Balanced Federal Budget	February 27, 2017	"House Enrolled Joint Resolution No. 2"	V
Arizona	Fiscal restraints on the federal government, limiting the power and jurisdiction of the federal government, and limiting the terms of office of federal officials, including members of Congress	March 13, 2017	Cong. Rec. Vol. 163, pp. S6534-S6535, POM-118 and POM-120 ("House Concurrent Resolution 2010")	V
North Dakota	Fiscal restraints on the federal government, limiting the power and jurisdiction of the federal government, and limiting the terms of office of federal officials, including members of Congress	March 24, 2017	Cong. Rec. Vol. 163, p. S2527, POM-16 ("House Concurrent Resolution No. 3006")	V
Arizona	Balanced Federal Budget	March 27, 2017	Cong. Rec. Vol. 163, p. S6535, POM-119 and POM-121 ("House Concurrent Resolution 2013")	V
Texas	Fiscal restraints on the federal government, limiting the power and jurisdiction of the federal government, and limiting the terms of office of federal officials, including members of Congress	May 10, 2017	Cong. Rec. Vol. 163, p. S4056, POM-65 ("Senate Joint Resolution No. 2")	V
Missouri	Fiscal restraints on the federal government, limiting the power and jurisdiction of the federal government, and limiting the terms of office of federal officials, including members of Congress	May 12, 2017	Cong. Rec. Vol. 163, pp. S3361-S3362, POM-40 ("Senate Concurrent Resolution No. 4")	V
Wisconsin	Balanced Federal Budget	November 7, 2017	Cong. Rec. Vol. 164, pp. S109-S110, POM-154 ("Assembly Joint Resolution No. 21")	V
Alabama	Term Limits on Members of Congress	January 25, 2018	Cong. Rec. Vol. 164, pp. S3759-S3760, POM-243 ("House Joint Resolution No. 23")	V
Missouri	Term Limits on Members of Congress	May 17, 2018	Cong. Rec. Vol. 164, p. S5422, POM-278 ("Senate Concurrent Resolution No. 40")	V
Arkansas	Fiscal restraints on the federal government, limiting the power and jurisdiction of the federal government, and limiting the terms of office of federal officials, including members of Congress	February 14, 2019	Cong. Rec. Vol. 165, pp. S5601-S5602, POM-138 and POM-139 ("Senate Joint Resolution No. 3")	V
Utah	Fiscal restraints on the federal government, limiting the power and jurisdiction of the federal government, and limiting the terms of office of federal officials, including members of Congress	March 5, 2019	"Senate Joint Resolution No. 9"	V
Mississippi	Fiscal restraints on the federal government, limiting the power and jurisdiction of the federal government, and limiting the terms of office of federal officials—but specifically excluding the imposition of term limits upon members of Congress	March 27, 2019	Cong. Rec. Vol. 165, p. S5447, POM-133 ("Senate Concurrent Resolution No. 596")	V
West Virginia	Term Limits on Members of Congress	March 22, 2021	Cong. Rec. Vol. 167, p. S4517, POM-18 ("House Concurrent Resolution No. 9")	V
Oklahoma	Combination of: (1) Balanced Federal Budget; and (2) Fiscal restraints on the federal government, limiting the power and jurisdiction of the federal government, and limiting the terms of office of federal officials, including members of Congress (reprising 2016 joint resolution numbered as "Senate Joint Resolution No. 4" which was scheduled to expire on December 31, 2023)	April 20, 2021	Cong. Rec., Vol. 167, pages S6839 through S6841, POM-85 and POM-86 ("Senate Joint Resolution No. 23")	V
Missouri	Fiscal restraints on the federal government, limiting the power and jurisdiction of the federal government, and limiting the terms of office of federal officials, including members of Congress (reprising 2017 concurrent resolution likewise numbered as "Senate Concurrent Resolution No. 4" which was scheduled to expire on the fifth anniversary of its adoption—that being in 2022)	May 13, 2021	Cong. Rec., Vol. 167, pp. S4770-S4771, POM-22 ("Senate Concurrent Resolution No. 4")	V
Wisconsin	Fiscal restraints on the federal government, limiting the power and jurisdiction of the federal government, and limiting the terms of office of federal officials, including members of Congress	January 25, 2022	Cong. Rec. Vol. 168, p. S4618, POM-219 ("Assembly Joint Resolution No. 9"—also known as "Enrolled Joint Resolution No. 9")	V
Nebraska	Fiscal restraints on the federal government, limiting the power and jurisdiction of the federal government, and limiting the terms of office of federal officials, including members of Congress	January 28, 2022	Cong. Rec., Vol. 168, pp. S1117-S1118, POM-114 ("Legislative Resolution No. 14")	V
Wisconsin	Term Limits on Members of Congress	February 24, 2022	Cong. Rec. Vol. 168, pp. S4616-S4617, POM-216 ("Senate Joint Resolution No. 102"—also known as "Enrolled Joint Resolution No. 18")	V
West Virginia	Fiscal restraints on the federal government, limiting the power and jurisdiction of the federal government, and limiting the terms of office of federal officials, including members of Congress	March 4, 2022	Cong. Rec., Vol. 168, pp. S2336-S2337, POM-136 ("House Concurrent Resolution No. 31")	V
South Carolina	Fiscal restraints on the federal government, limiting the power and jurisdiction of the federal government, and limiting the terms of office of federal officials, including members of Congress	March 29, 2022	Cong. Rec., Vol. 168, p. S3074, POM-155 ("H. 3205")	V
Missouri	Term Limits on Members of Congress (reprising 2018 concurrent resolution numbered as "Senate Concurrent Resolution No. 40" which was scheduled to expire on the fifth anniversary of its adoption—that being in 2023)	May 10, 2022	Cong. Rec., Vol. 168, p. S4043, POM-185 ("Senate Concurrent Resolution No. 25")	V
Oklahoma	Term Limits on Members of Congress	April 20, 2023	Cong. Rec., Vol. 169, p. S4755, POM-70 and POM-71 ("House Joint Resolution No. 1032")	V
California	Regulation of Firearms; Raising Age to 21	September 14, 2023	Cong. Rec., Vol. 170, pp. S72-S73, POM-92 ("Senate Joint Resolution No. 7")	V
Florida	Term Limits on Members of Congress	February 1, 2024	("House Concurrent Resolution No. 693")	V
Florida	Balanced Federal Budget	February 1, 2024	("House Concurrent Resolution No. 703")	V
Florida	Prohibit Congress from making any federal law applying to the general public that does not also equally apply to all U.S. Representatives, to all U.S. Senators, and to all other persons within the legislative branch of the federal government	March 4, 2024	("House Concurrent Resolution No. 7055")	V
Florida	Grant to President of the United States Line-Item Veto Authority within Federal Appropriations Legislation	March 4, 2024	("House Concurrent Resolution No. 7057")	V
Tennessee	Term Limits on Members of Congress	April 11, 2024	Cong. Rec., Vol. 170, pp. S5188-S5189, POM-144 ("House Joint Resolution No. 5")	V
Louisiana	Term Limits on Members of Congress	May 13, 2024	Cong. Rec. Vol. 171, pp. S7138-S7139, POM-20 ("Senate Concurrent Resolution No. 2")	V
North Carolina	Term Limits on Members of Congress	December 2, 2024	("House Joint Resolution No. 151")	V
South Dakota	Term Limits on Members of Congress	March 4, 2025	Cong. Rec. Vol. 172, pp. S160-S161, POM-28 and POM-29 ("Senate Joint Resolution No. 5002")	V
Indiana	Term Limits on Members of Congress	March 17, 2025	("Senate Joint Resolution No. 21")	V
South Carolina	Term Limits on Members of Congress	May 7, 2025	Cong. Rec. Vol. 172, pp. S730-S731, POM-32 ("House Concurrent Resolution No. 3008")	V
Texas	Fiscal restraints on the federal government, limiting the power and jurisdiction of the federal government, and limiting the terms of office of federal officials, including members of Congress (reprising 2017 joint resolution numbered as "Senate Joint Resolution No. 2" which—per 2017 Texas Senate Joint Resolution No. 38—was scheduled to expire on the eighth anniversary of 2017 Texas Senate Joint Resolution No. 2's adoption, that being in 2025; likewise per 2017 Texas Senate Joint Resolution No. 38, 2025 Texas House Joint Resolution No. 98 possibly might expire in the year 2033)	May 8, 2025	("House Joint Resolution No. 98")	V
South Carolina	Balanced Federal Budget	January 14, 2026	Cong. Rec. Vol. 172, pp. S2078-S2079, POM-36 ("House Concurrent Resolution No. 3007")	V
Kansas	Fiscal restraints on the federal government, limiting the power and jurisdiction of the federal government, and limiting the terms of office of federal officials, including members of Congress	January 22, 2026	Cong. Rec. Vol. 172, pp. S4262-S4263, POM-59 ("Senate Concurrent Resolution No. 1604")	V
Kansas	Term Limits on Members of Congress	March 5, 2026	Cong. Rec. Vol. 172, p. S2079, POM-37 ("House Concurrent Resolution No. 5022")	V
Arizona	Term Limits on Members of Congress	April 21, 2026	Cong. Rec. Vol. 172, p S2695, POM-46 ("House Concurrent Resolution No. 2043")	V

== Counts by states ==
In 1929 Wisconsin presented a list of states having made applications for a convention exceeding the two-thirds requirement that was referred to the Senate Judiciary Committee, with no further action. In 2013 states began listing existing state applications when joining them.

=== Wisconsin 1929 ===
In 1929 Wisconsin applied to Congress to perform their constitutional duty to call a convention, listing Alabama, Arkansas, California, Colorado, Delaware, Georgia, Idaho, Illinois, Indiana, Iowa, Kansas, Kentucky, Louisiana, Maine, Michigan, Minnesota, Missouri, Montana, Nebraska, Nevada, New Jersey, New York, North Carolina, Ohio, Oklahoma, Oregon, Pennsylvania, South Dakota, Tennessee, Texas, Utah, Vermont, Virginia, Washington, and Wisconsin as states having made an application for a convention. There were 48 states in 1929, so 32 applications would be required to call a convention. 35 states were named.

Links to the text of applications by all states except California and North Carolina are provided in the table above. A reference to an application by California has been found in the Congressional Record and the text of an application by South Carolina is given in the table above. It may be that North Carolina was mistakenly included for South Carolina.

Three states, Missouri, Texas, and Wisconsin, had applied for a general convention. Eleven states listed had applied for a convention to prohibit polygamy (Delaware, Illinois, Michigan, Minnesota, Montana, Nebraska, Ohio, Oregon, South Dakota, Vermont, and Washington), plus South Carolina. Idaho had included the direct election of the President and Vice President with their request for direct election of Senators. Thus, 16 states clearly had outstanding applications.

Alabama and Georgia had outstanding issues from 1832 and 1833, making a less certain 18. Colorado, Indiana, Iowa, Kansas, Louisiana, Nevada, and Oklahoma would be added if we include class II requests for Direct Elections of Senators, for a total of 25.

The only known records for an application New York and Virginia are their ratification documents, before the Bill of Rights. New Jersey and Kentucky applied for a convention to prevent the Civil War, and class III applications for the Direct Election of Senators. Arkansas, Maine, Pennsylvania, Tennessee, and Utah only had documented class III applications for the Direct Election of Senators. California is most likely in this group. These ten states have applications that may have been mooted by amendments proposed by Congress.

=== Balanced budget ===
The balanced budget application of Ohio in 2013 through that of Arizona in 2017—except North Dakota—include a list of previous state applications for a balanced budget. Wisconsin's 2017 application also does not contain such a list. These lists mostly extend the previous lists, except possibly omitting state applications from the same legislative session.

Arizona has the most complete list, including Alabama, Alaska, Arizona, Arkansas, Colorado, Florida, Georgia, Indiana, Iowa, Kansas, Louisiana, Maryland, Michigan, Mississippi, Missouri, Nebraska, Nevada, New Hampshire, New Mexico, North Carolina, North Dakota, Ohio, Oklahoma, Pennsylvania, South Dakota, Tennessee, Texas, Utah and West Virginia. This represents 29 states.

Applications for all of the states mentioned above can be found in the list. Additionally, rescinded applications can be found for Delaware, Idaho, Oregon and Virginia. In particular, Delaware is included in lists prior to their rescission in 2016, but not after.

Wyoming and Wisconsin have made recent applications not included by Arizona, while Maryland, Nevada, New Mexico, and Colorado have recently rescinded their applications. This suggests a current total of 27 states, seven short of the required 34.

=== Convention of States Resolution ===
The Convention of States Resolution includes fiscal restraints on the federal government, limiting the power and jurisdiction of the federal government, and limiting the terms of office of federal officials, including members of Congress.

A complete list of passed resolutions with vote summaries, filing dates, and related links can be found using the Convention of States website.

As of January 22, 2026, 20 of the 34 states needed have passed the resolution—with zero rescissions.

=== Wolf Pac Resolution ===
The Wolf Pac Resolution calls for regulation of election campaign donations and expenditures; end legal concept of "corporate personhood"; overturn 2010 U.S. Supreme Court decision in case of Citizens United v. Federal Election Commission. Rhode Island included a count of the states in their 2016 application.

Rhode Island has the most complete list, including the following five states: California, Illinois, New Jersey, Rhode Island and Vermont. All of these applications are included in the list, with no recent additions. The legislatures of California (2025), Illinois (2022) and New Jersey (2021) subsequently rescinded their Article V Convention applications for Wolf Pac's resolution—as well as canceling other such prior Convention-requesting resolutions on other topics.

=== U.S. Term Limits ===
The U.S. Term Limits Resolution, campaigned for by US Term Limits, calls for a constitutional amendment limiting the terms of members of Congress. States passing applications are Florida in 2016; Alabama in 2018; Missouri in 2018 (reprised in 2022 to avert expiration); West Virginia in 2021; Wisconsin in 2022; Oklahoma in 2023; Louisiana, North Carolina and Tennessee all in 2024; Indiana, South Carolina and South Dakota all in 2025 and Arizona and Kansas both in 2026—for a total of 14 states to date.

== Paulsen style application counts ==
Michael Stokes Paulsen holds that the applications for a convention alone should govern the convention. Thus, this section contains counts of applications based on groupings not excluded by the applications themselves.

Counts including class IV, V, or VI applications would be limited to those with the same description and can be found by sorting the list by topic.

=== Class I and II applications ===
Indiana, Missouri, Ohio, Texas, and Wisconsin have outstanding applications for a convention to propose amendments, with no accompanying issue.

Alabama has a request for a convention limiting tariffs, and South Carolina one for clarification on Amendment X, each implying that other amendments may be considered.

=== Class I, II, and III Applications ===
24 more states have outstanding class III applications. These are Arkansas, California, Colorado, Connecticut, Delaware, Illinois, Iowa, Kansas, Kentucky, Maryland, Massachusetts, Michigan, Minnesota, Mississippi, Nebraska, Nevada, New Mexico, North Dakota, Pennsylvania, Rhode Island, South Dakota, Vermont, Virginia, and Washington.

This gives a total of 31 states with known class I, II, or III applications. Three more applications would meet the 2/3rds requirement to call a convention.

== Brennan style application counts ==
Thomas E. Brennan holds that, in 1982, it was necessary, desirable, and feasible to hold a convention. He lists the following counts in the introduction to his claim:

- 450 applications through 1980, plus 25 more since 1980, gives 475 total applications.
- Applications from every state in the union (Hawaii's expired and did not call for a convention, 8 states have rescinded all applications, leaving 41).
- 36 states with more than six or more separate applications (Ten of those have since rescinded all or most of their applications, and five are not identified in the table above, but several states have five applications listed here).

== See also ==
- List of rescissions of Article V Convention applications
- Convention to propose amendments to the United States Constitution
- Second Constitutional Convention of the United States
