= Jack Janssen =

American politician

Member of the Kansas State Senate from the 35th District
- In office 1973–1980
- Succeeded by: Roy Ehrlich

Member of the Kansas State Senate from the 23rd District
- In office 1969–1972

Member of the Kansas State Senate from the 33rd District
- In office 1965–1968

Personal details
- Born: July 6, 1923 Lyons, Kansas
- Died: March 7, 2013 Lyons, Kansas
- Party: Democratic
- Spouse: Dorothy Link (m. August 14, 1943)

Jack Wesley Janssen (July 6, 1923–March 7, 2013) was an American politician who served as a Democrat in the Kansas State Senate from 1965 to 1980.

Janssen was born and resided in Lyons, Kansas. He was elected to the Kansas State Senate in 1964 and served for four terms: first in the 33rd District, followed by one term in the 23rd District, and two final terms in the 35th District.
