= Wolf-PAC =

American nonpartisan political action committee

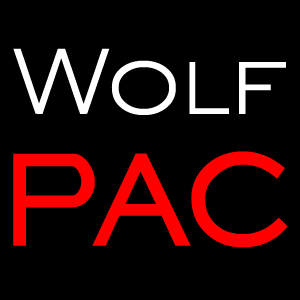
- Formation: October 19, 2011; 15 years ago
- Founder: Cenk Uygur
- Type: Political action committee
- Headquarters: Carthay, Los Angeles, California, U.S.
- National Director: Josh Aciz
- Website: wolf-pac.com

Wolf-PAC is an American nonpartisan political action committee formed in 2011 with the goal of adding an "amendment to the United States Constitution to ensure balance, integrity, and transparency to our national system of campaign finance".

Wolf-PAC argues that Congress is too corrupted by big money and special interests to adequately address campaign finance reform, citing sources ranging from personal experience to a well known Princeton study. The organization works nationwide with state legislators using the state initiated convention procedure in Article V of the Constitution to propose an amendment to fix the influence that big money and special interests have over the American government. Wolf-PAC asserts that applying for a convention will either directly result in the desired amendment or pressure Congress to act.

Wolf-PAC was founded in October 2011 in response to the idea that big money interests had bought influence over American politics at the federal level and that this corrupt system had been entrenched by Supreme Court cases dating back decades that ruled many bipartisan campaign finance laws unconstitutional. The name was intended to be a strong response to the aggressive tactics of the special interests the group was fighting against, as explained by Wolf-PAC founder Cenk Uygur, "from now on, they're not coming for us, we're coming for them."

Wolf-PAC introduced its first convention call in Texas in 2013 and passed its first call in Vermont in 2014. As of 2019, five states have passed Wolf-PAC's call for a convention to propose an amendment to reform the U.S. campaign finance system, and 24 more introduced the resolution for consideration in 2019. Wolf-PAC has an active chapter in every state in the U.S. and has a membership that includes more than 50,000 volunteer sign ups. The organization has four full-time staffers.

== Early history ==
=== Supreme Court cases ===
The catalyst behind much of the modern campaign finance reform effort is Citizens United v. FEC, which overturned the Bipartisan Campaign Reform Act (BCRA) of 2003, commonly known as McCain-Feingold. Uygur, though, says he was motivated principally by the major precedents that lead to Citizens United, like Buckley v. Valeo (1976), which equated campaign spending with free speech and First National Bank of Boston v. Bellotti (1978), which allowed independent expenditures by corporations to influence elections. Wolf-PAC has also cited subsequent cases as further demonstrating the need for a Constitutional Amendment, such as American Tradition Partnership, Inc. v. Bullock (2012) and McCutcheon v. FEC (2015).

=== Research into the Article V convention process ===
The inspiration for Wolf-PAC's plan comes from previous efforts to call for a limited Article V convention that ultimately pressured Congress to propose an Amendment to the U.S. Constitution themselves. The group frequently cites the Bill of Rights, which was proposed after New York and Virginia called for a convention and the Seventeenth Amendment, which was proposed after 29 states called for a convention for direct election of senators. The Congressional Research Service refers to this as the "prodding effect."

In addition to three contemporary Congressional Research Service reports, Wolf-PAC also heavily relies on primary source reports from the Department of Justice and American Bar Association. These studies readily examined the Article V process as applied to the states, and found multiple, well-maintained safety nets to assure an amendment called by convention could stay focused and effective.

Lawrence Lessig, a Harvard professor and constitutional law scholar, provided input on the amendment process in the founding of Wolf-PAC.

=== Launch of Wolf-PAC ===
Uygur announced the formation and launch of Wolf-PAC on October 19, 2011, in New York City's Zuccotti Park in the midst of the Occupy Wall Street movement. He expressed that the frustration motivating the liberal Wall Street protest mirrored that which motivated the formation of the conservative Tea Party, saying "I think the Tea Party and Occupy Wall Street have a lot of similarities. You know, on the fringes, and when you get to the issues they may have a lot of disagreements. I believe this on health care and I believe that on health care. But the core of both movements is, we're tired of our corrupt government." Through Wolf-PAC, Uygur hoped to address what he believed to be the root-cause of this mutual anger: an errant campaign finance system.

=== Early organization ===
Following the announcement of its founding, the foundations for Wolf-PAC including its website and its messaging were laid out by a handful of volunteers. Among the first volunteers of Wolf-PAC was current National Director Michael Monetta, who signed up within hours of the announced launch. The first National Director, Christopher Campbell, was hired shortly after the official announcement.

By 2013, a handful of states introduced resolutions for an Article V Convention to restore free and fair elections without being asked by Wolf-PAC, including Minnesota, Massachusetts, and California. Representative Burnam of Texas was the first to introduce Wolf-PAC's Free and Fair Elections resolution on February 21, 2013. That resolution included a "daisy chain," listing other convention calls on the same subject matter in order to ensure there could be no question about which ones were intended to count as part of the same application.

== Passed resolutions ==
Map showing states which have called for an Article V convention as advocated by Wolf PAC.

As a national group, Wolf PAC is working in all 50 states and reports over 20,000 volunteers. Note that it is not uncommon for an introduced resolution to be left to a committee where it dies after the legislative session of that state ends without any voting or sufficient votes to move the motion forward (a death in committee). Such resolutions can simply be reintroduced in current legislative sessions until a vote is called. Only when bill(s) have passed in both legislative chambers would the state be listed as calling a limited convention of the states.

=== Vermont ===
On March 21, 2014, the Vermont Senate passed JRS 27, a Wolf PAC-backed resolution, in a bipartisan 25 to 2 vote. On May 2, 2014, the Vermont House passed the resolution by a vote of 95–43, making Vermont the first state in the nation to call for an Article V convention concerning campaign finance reform. The language of the resolution called for a convention "for the sole purpose of proposing amendments to the Constitution of the United States of America that would limit the corrupting influence of money in our electoral process, including, inter alia, by overturning the Citizens United decision."

Sen Dick Sears, D-Bennington, was a key figure in passing the resolution. He received a call from a constituent and became convinced that the strategy made sense. "I think it's an important resolution," Sears said. "Congress isn't going to act, and we've got to do something to get this country back under control." When the resolution reached the House, an emotional plea from South Burlington farmer Benjamin Brown brought about a sense of urgency. "What am I going to tell my children, what am I going to be able to say to them about this democracy?" Brown asked the legislators. "Vermont has an opportunity to lead right now it's not left and right, it's an issue of democracy," he said. Rep. Mike Yantachka, D-Charlotte, agreed. He described the resolution as, "an opportunity to kick-start a movement that I hope will spread throughout the country and let people become aware of the real problems we have with the influence of money on elections and on our public policy." In contrast to these views, Senate Minority Leader Joe Benning, R-Caledonia, saw the resolution as a grave mistake. "I see it as an attack on free speech," Benning said. "I did not want to give my vote to something that clearly restricts free speech, because I think the First Amendment is one of the most important amendments we have, if not the most important."

On May 15, 2014, following the passage of JRS 27, U.S. Senator Patrick Leahy of Vermont scheduled a June 3 hearing for S.J Res 19, a proposed amendment by Senator Tom Udall (D-NM) to address the influence of money in US elections, in the Senate Judiciary committee. Senator Leahy cited his home state's application for a convention to propose an amendment as part of his motivation, stating: "It is time for Congress to follow the lead of the states and build support for amending the Constitution to ensure that all Americans can exercise their First Amendment rights…. Vermonters have been leading the nation on this issue, and many in our country took note that our Legislature was the first to call for a constitutional convention for the purpose of drafting a remedy." "Not only have Vermonters urged me to advance a constitutional amendment in the Senate, but they have acted themselves on this vital issue by calling for a constitutional convention…. Vermont's call for a constitutional convention is a separate approach for amending the Constitution that can operate on a parallel track to the congressional approach that we are initiating today. It is my hope that the two efforts can work in tandem to create even more momentum on this critical issue."

=== California ===
On March 20, 2012, resolution was introduced in the California State Assembly, but was voted down in the Judiciary Committee. On January 30, 2014, the California State Assembly became the second state lower chamber to pass a resolution calling for a constitutional convention. On June 23, 2014, California became the second state in the nation to pass a resolution. The language of the resolution called for a convention "for the sole purpose of proposing an amendment to the United States Constitution that would limit corporate personhood for purposes of campaign finance and political speech and would further declare that money does not constitute speech and may be legislatively limited."

The state Senate voted 23–11 to support the resolution. Assemblyman Mike Gatto, the author of the resolution, remarked, "I doubt our founding fathers had the free-speech rights of multinational and foreign corporations in mind when they drafted the First Amendment." Senator Hannah-Beth Jackson, D-Santa Barbara, recognized young people for their contribution to countering the Citizens United decision. "They have taken the lead in this effort," she observed, "because they recognize that the future of democracy, that their futures, that the future of this nation...are very much at risk as a result of this decision. Money is not speech. Corporations are not people. And up until the Supreme Court decision that flipped that on its head, that was the standard in the United States of America."

High school teacher Alison Hartson served as the volunteer State Leader for California and would later become National Director of Wolf-PAC, before stepping down to run for United States Senate. She continues to work with the organization.

=== Illinois ===
On April 9, 2014, SJR 42 passed the Illinois Senate by a 37–15 vote. State Sen. Christine Radogno, R-Lemont, was the lone Republican state Senator to vote in favor of the resolution. On December 3, 2014, the Illinois House voted 74–40 in favor of the joint resolution, making Illinois the third state to pass such a resolution. The Illinois resolution called for a convention "in order to address concerns such as those raised by the decision of the United States Supreme Court in Citizens United v. Federal Election Commission and related cases and events, including those occurring long before or afterward, or for a substantially similar purpose, and desires that the convention should be so limited."

Prior to the House vote, Harvard Law professor Lawrence Lessig testified before a House committee, saying: "My ideal amendment is one that secures Congress the power to guarantee free and fair elections by making sure that we don't have a Congress that's dependent on raising millions...There are two things that have to change: the way we fund elections and the ability to eliminate entities like Super PACs from dominating the political arena." John McGinnis, a Northwestern University professor of constitutional law, disagreed with his assessment. "I think it's a very bad idea," he opined. "I think we should have more speech at the time of elections. This seems to me to make the United States system a less participatory system...I see this as an attempt by people like Professor Lessig and what I call the 'new class,' the media and academics, to restrict people who don't have opinions for a living from participating. If you look at the media and academics, they look a lot less diverse in their ideological views than rich people. Rich people are pretty divided between Republicans and Democrats."

=== New Jersey ===
A resolution to call for a constitutional convention to overturn Citizens United was introduced on August 11, 2014.

Testimony before the New Jersey Senate included speeches from Wolf PAC volunteers as well as an appearance from Americans for Prosperity. Wolf-PAC saw the attendance by the latter group as a sign of concern from moneyed interests at the progress that has been made to counter the undue influence of money in elections.

On February 23, 2015, the New Jersey Assembly passed the resolution by a vote of 44–25, and New Jersey's became the fourth state legislature to adopt Wolf-PAC's amendment resolution. The resolution called for a convention for the purpose of "proposing amendments to the Constitution of the United States that would limit the corrupting influence of money in our political system."

The resolution had previously been passed by the state Senate. "A constitutional convention is clearly needed to correct the disastrous impact of recent court decisions on the integrity of elections in New Jersey and throughout the nation," declared Assemblyman Dan Benson, D-Hamilton Township. "Citizens United opened the door to unlimited spending by shadowy, well-funded groups with no transparency or accountability – spending that drowns out the voice of the American voter and threatens the fundamental fairness of our democracy." Benson found some agreement across the aisle as Assemblyman Declan O'Scanlon, R-Little Silver, supported certain campaign funding restrictions. "We restrict corporations but not unions. Perhaps a convention like this would come up with solutions," O'Scanlon said. However, Assemblyman Michael Patrick Carroll, R-Morris Township, disagreed with the resolution. "America boosts a long and salutary tradition of robust forceful unrestrained political expression," Carroll said. "The influence of money is grossly understated. It profoundly insults the American people to imply or insert that they are so stupid that they can't make informed political decision that they cannot assess the merits of political arguments before them."

=== Rhode Island ===
Rhode Island adopted their resolution on June 17, 2016, the fifth state to do so. The resolution was introduced in the House by Representative Arthur Handy and in the Senate by Senator Joshua Miller. The language of the Rhode Island resolution called for a convention "in order to address concerns such as those raised by the decision of the United States Supreme Court in Citizens United v. Federal Election Commission and related cases and events, including those occurring long before or afterward, or for a substantially similar purpose, and desires that the convention should be so limited."

The resolution received a vote in the House on the second to last day of session and was adopted in the Senate on the final day. The Senators were so moved by the work of the dedicated volunteers that they took the time to give short speeches congratulating them for their work before the vote. While the Senators had instructed those watching that applause was forbidden in the gallery, after adopting the resolution unanimously in the Senate the Senators gave the Wolf-PAC volunteers a standing ovation.

== Criticism ==
=== "Runaway convention" theory ===
Because an Article V convention has never occurred (since historically, Congress has pre-emptively proposed the amendment itself on several occasions when the states have come close to calling for one), it is unclear how such a convention would function in practice. While the convention called for by Wolf-PAC is one that is limited in scope to the topic of campaign finance reform, there is disagreement over whether delegates to the convention are legally bound from going beyond the established topic. This ambiguity has led to concerns that an Article V convention could lead to a "runaway convention", in which rogue delegates might make proposals outside the permissible scope of the convention topic.

Wolf-PAC has argued that even if an unintended runaway convention was to occur, it would not pose a threat to the Constitution because any amendment proposed by an Article V convention would still need to be ratified by a three-fourths supermajority of the states. Other groups that have called for similar Article V conventions, such as U.S. Term Limits, are often faced with the idea of a runaway convention, and respond with the same argument.

=== Conflict with Common Cause ===
Cenk Uygur published a video on The Young Turk's YouTube channel on April 4, 2017, discussing Washington D.C.-based lobbying group Common Cause's efforts to lobby New Mexico's House of Representatives to not bring to a vote SJR12, which was passed in the State Senate. In the video, Uygur outlines issues Wolf PAC has with Common Cause, such as using paid lobbyists to thwart efforts of Wolf-PAC volunteers, using an appearance as a progressive organization despite having centrist goals, opposing the use of an Article V convention to create an amendment, and their lobbyists' attempts to rescind the bill Wolf PAC helped to pass in Vermont.

Uygur later published videos in May 2017 alleging that Democratic strategists at the national level have begun whisper campaigns in Hawaii and Maryland with lobbying groups such as Common Cause, which caused resolutions Wolf-PAC supported in those states to be denied a vote, despite initially having heavy support.

== See also ==
- Mayday PAC
- Move to Amend
- Second Constitutional Convention of the United States
- Justice Democrats
