= Federal Convention (disambiguation) =

Federal Convention, a gathering to consider reforming a Frame of Government, may refer to any convention called under the authority of a central government; such as:

- Constitutional Convention (United States) (1787), the convention where the United States Constitution was written, also called the Philadelphia Convention
- Convention to propose amendments to the United States Constitution, method of proposing amendment(s) under Article Five of the United States Constitution
- Constitutional conventions called by Acts of the United States Congress under Article Four of the United States Constitution for the admission of new states from federal territories
- Constitutional conventions mandated by the Reconstruction Acts after the American Civil War
- Second Constitutional Convention of the United States, a proposal for reforming the United States Federal government by rewriting its Constitution.
- Federal Convention (German Confederation), the legislative body of the German Confederation
- Federal Convention (Germany), the body that elects the President of Germany
- Federal Convention of Namibia, a former political party in Namibia
- National Democratic and Federal Convention, a political party in Chad
- Conventions held preliminary to the Federation of Australia#Early constitutional conventions
