= Les Mason =

American politician (1954–2024)

Member of the Kansas House of Representatives from the 73rd district
- In office February 19, 2014 – June 3, 2024
- Preceded by: Clark Shultz
- Succeeded by: Lori Shultz

Personal details
- Born: October 11, 1954 McPherson County, Kansas, U.S.
- Died: June 3, 2024 (aged 69) Wichita, Kansas, U.S.
- Party: Republican
- Spouse: Kala
- Children: 3
- Education: Central Christian College
- Profession: businessman

Les Mason (October 11, 1954 – June 3, 2024) was an American politician. He served as a Republican member for the 73rd district in the Kansas House of Representatives from 2014 to 2024.

Mason died on June 3, 2024, at the age of 69, following a brain aneurysm.
