= Clark Shultz =

American politician

Member of the Kansas Senate from the 35th district
- In office February 3, 2014 – January 12, 2015
- Preceded by: Jay Emler
- Succeeded by: Rick Wilborn

Member of the Kansas House of Representatives from the 73rd district
- In office January 13, 1997 – February 3, 2014
- Preceded by: Delbert Crabb
- Succeeded by: Les Mason

Personal details
- Born: February 13, 1957 (age 69)
- Party: Republican
- Spouse: Lori
- Children: 6
- Education: Wichita State University (BA); Baker University (MBA)

Clark Shultz (born 1957) is a former Republican member of the Kansas Senate, having represented the 35th district. Following the resignation of Jay Emler in January 2014, he was selected to take the position by Precinct and Township Republican Committeemen and Committeewomen. He previously served in the Kansas House of Representatives, representing the 73rd district. His was succeeded in the House by Les Mason. He had served since 1997. He and his family currently reside in Lindsborg.

== Committee membership ==
- Health and Human Services
- Financial Institutions
- Insurance (Chair)
- Rules and Journal (Chair)
- Select Committee on KPERS (Vice-Chair)

== Major Donors ==
The top 5 donors to Shultz's 2008 campaign:

- 1. Kansas Assoc of Insurance Agents $1,000
- 2. Koch Industries $1,000
- 3. Kansas Bankers Assoc $1,000
- 4. Kansas Hospital Assoc $1,000
- 5. HSBC North America $1,000
