= Jay Emler =

American politician

Member of the Kansas Senate from the 35th district
- In office January 8, 2001 – January 16, 2014
- Preceded by: Don Steffes
- Succeeded by: Clark Shultz

Personal details
- Born: May 25, 1949 (age 77) Denver, Colorado, U.S.
- Party: Republican
- Spouse: Lorraine Emler
- Children: 2
- Education: Naval Postgraduate School; University of Denver; Bethany College
- Profession: attorney

Jay Scott Emler (born May 25, 1949) is a former Republican member of the Kansas Senate, representing the 35th district from 2001 until 2014. He previously worked as a Municipal Judge in Lindsborg. Emler was elected by his colleagues to serve as majority leader of the Senate, following Derek Schmidt's election as Kansas Attorney General. Emler assumed the position when the Senate convened January 10, 2011. Emler accepted an appointment to the Kansas Corporation Commission and resigned his seat in the Kansas Senate in 2014; he was succeeded by Clark Shultz.

He lives in Lindsborg, is married to Lorraine Emler and practices law in McPherson.

== Committee assignments ==
Sen. Emler works on these legislative committees:

- Ways and Means
- Joint Committee on Kansas Security (vice-chair)
- Commerce
- Joint Committee on Pensions, Investments and Benefits
- Joint Committee on State Building Construction
- Utilities

== Major donors ==
Some of the top contributors to Sen. Emler's 2008 campaign, according to the National Institute on Money in State Politics:

Kansas Republican Senatorial Committee, Greater Kansas City Chamber of Commerce, Kansas Contractors Association, Koch Industries, Pioneer Communications

Energy and natural resources companies were his largest donor group.
