= Don Steffes =

American politician

Member of the Kansas Senate from the 35th district
- In office 1993–2000
- Preceded by: Roy Ehrlich
- Succeeded by: Jay Emler

Personal details
- Born: January 13, 1930 Olpe, Kansas, U.S.
- Died: May 24, 2018 McPherson, Kansas
- Party: Republican
- Spouse: Janie Steele (m. October 10, 1953 in Gladewater, Texas)
- Children: 7
- Education: Emporia State University (B.A. and M.A.)

Don Steffes (January 13, 1930 – May 24, 2018) was an American politician who served in the Kansas State Senate as a Republican from 1993 to 2000.

Steffes was born in Olpe, Kansas as the second of four children. He graduated high school in 1947 and served for 18 months in the U.S. Army before enrolling in Emporia State University, graduating in 1952. After graduation, he worked on oil pipeline construction and married Janie Steele in Gladewater, Texas.

He returned to Kansas and earned his master's degree at Emporia State, while working for various Chambers of Commerce in the state. In 1968, he became president of a bank in McPherson, Kansas. He became active in local Republican party politics, and in 1992 ran for a vacant seat in the Kansas Senate. He served two full terms in the Senate; after the 2000 elections, he retired and began splitting his time between Kansas and Arizona. He died in McPherson in 2018.
