= Convention to propose amendments to the United States Constitution =

Process for amending the U.S. constitution

A convention to propose amendments to the United States Constitution, also referred to as an Article V Convention, state convention, or amendatory convention is one of two methods authorized by Article Five of the United States Constitution whereby amendments to the United States Constitution may be proposed: on the Application of two thirds of the State legislatures (34 of the 50) the Congress shall call a convention for proposing amendments, which become law only after ratification by three-fourths of the states (38 of the 50). The Article V convention method has never been used; but 33 amendments have been proposed by the other method, a two-thirds vote in both houses of Congress; and 27 of these have been ratified by three-fourths of the States. Although there has never been a federal constitutional convention since the original one, at the state level more than 230 constitutional conventions have assembled in the United States.

While there have been calls for an Article V Convention based on a single issue such as the balanced budget amendment, it is not clear whether a convention summoned in this way would be legally bound to limit discussion to a single issue; law professor Michael Stokes Paulsen has suggested that such a convention would have the "power to propose anything it sees fit", whereas law professor Michael Rappaport and attorney-at-law Robert Kelly believe that a limited convention is possible.

In recent years, some have argued that state governments should call for such a convention. They include Michael Farris, Lawrence Lessig, Sanford Levinson, Larry Sabato, Jonathan Turley, Mark Levin, Ben Shapiro, and Greg Abbott. (Note: Attributed to multiple sources:) In 2015, Citizens for Self-Governance launched a nationwide effort to require Congress to call an Article V Convention, through a project called Convention of the States, in a bid to "rein in the federal government". As of January 27, 2026, CSG's resolution has passed in 20 states. Similarly, the group Wolf-PAC chose this method to promote its cause, which is to overturn the U.S. Supreme Court's decision in Citizens United v. FEC. Their resolution has passed in five states.

In late 2023, The Heritage Foundation issued a report titled Reconsidering the Wisdom of an Article V Convention of the States.

Organizations opposed to an Article V convention include the John Birch Society, the Center on Budget and Policy Priorities, Eagle Forum, Common Cause, Cato Institute, and the Ron Paul Institute for Peace and Prosperity. Law Professor emeritus William A. Woodruff has pointed out that James Madison, the Father of the Constitution, a member of the Virginia legislature, a delegate to the Philadelphia Convention, and a delegate to the Annapolis Convention that recommended what became the Philadelphia Convention, was opposed to an Article V convention to consider adding a bill of rights to the Constitution. When asked whether a convention should be called to consider a bill of rights, Madison said, "Having witnessed the difficulties and dangers experienced by the first Convention which assembled under every propitious circumstance, I should tremble for the result of a second . . . . " Woodruff urges state legislators who are asked to vote in favor of an application to Congress to call an Article V convention to carefully consider the knowns and unknowns of the convention method before opening Constitutions to a series of unintended consequences. Peter M. Shane writes that a convention could be more malapportioned than Congress. Amendments pending ratifications could polarize state-level politics.

== History ==
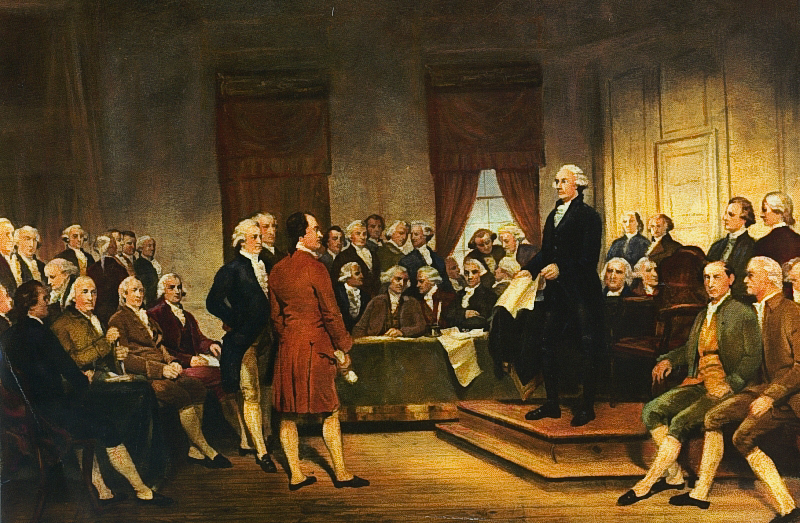
A painting depicting the signing of the United States Constitution

At the time the 1787 Constitutional Convention convened in Philadelphia, eight state constitutions included an amendment mechanism. Amendment-making power rested with the legislature in three of the states and in the other five it was given to specially elected conventions. The Articles of Confederation provided that amendments were to be proposed by Congress and ratified by the unanimous vote of all thirteen state legislatures. This was seen by the Federalists as a major flaw in the Articles, as it created a nearly insurmountable obstacle to constitutional reform. The amendment process crafted during the Constitutional Convention, James Madison later wrote in The Federalist No. 43, was designed to establish a balance between pliancy and rigidity:

It guards equally against that extreme facility which would render the Constitution too mutable; and that extreme difficulty which might perpetuate its discovered faults. It moreover equally enables the General and the State Governments to originate the amendment of errors, as they may be pointed out by the experience on one side, or on the other.

=== Creation of the amendment process ===
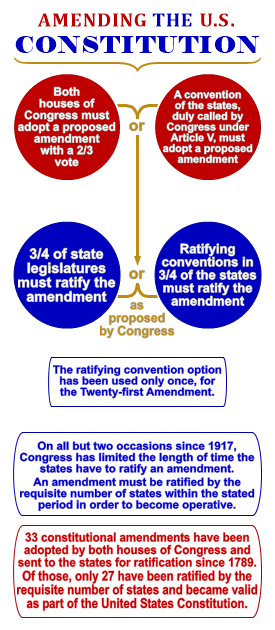
The U.S. constitutional amendment process

One of the main reasons for the 1787 Convention was that the Articles of Confederation required the unanimous consent of all 13 states for the national government to take action. This system had proved unworkable, and the newly written Constitution sought to address this problem.

The first proposal for a method of amending the Constitution offered in the Constitutional Convention, contained in the Virginia Plan, sought to circumvent the national legislature, stating that "the assent of the National Legislature ought not to be required." This was subsequently modified by the Committee of Detail to include a process whereby Congress would call for a constitutional convention on the request of two-thirds of the state legislatures.

During the debate on the Committee of Detail's report, James Madison expressed concern about the lack of detail in the article regarding how the convention amendment process would work, stating that "difficulties might arise as to the form" a convention would take. He later proposed removing reference to the convention amendment process, thus giving the national legislature sole authority to propose amendments whenever it thought necessary or when two-thirds of the states applied to the national legislature. Several delegates voiced opposition to the idea of the national legislature retaining sole power to propose constitutional amendments. George Mason argued from the floor of the Convention that it "would be improper to require the consent of the National Legislature, because they may abuse their power, and refuse their consent on that very account." Mason added that, "no amendments of the proper kind would ever be obtained by the people, if the Government should become oppressive." In response to these concerns, the Convention unanimously voted to add the language allowing states to apply to Congress for a convention to propose amendments to the Constitution.

== Permissible scope of applications to Congress ==
A frequent question is whether applications from the states can omit to mention subject matter, and instead request an unlimited convention. Practice suggests that separate unlimited applications submitted to Congress at different times are not allowed. Article V itself calls for "the application of the legislatures" instead of calling for plural "applications".

States have requested that Congress convene an Article V convention to propose amendments on a variety of subjects. According to the National Archives, Congress has, however, never officially tabulated the applications, nor separated them by subject matter. On at least one occasion though, the Congressional Record has included such a tabulation, which indicated that, as of September 22, 1981, thirty states had made a request for a balanced budget amendment. In 1993, professor Michael Paulsen and his research staff assembled a listing of all state applications to date, but neither Paulsen's list, nor any other, can be safely characterized as "complete" since there may very well be state applications that have been overlooked and/or forgotten.

In two law review articles in 1993 and again in 2011, Paulsen argued that state applications for an Article V convention limited to a particular subject matter are invalid and that only applications that include a call for an unrestricted convention are valid. If Paulsen's criteria that state applications must not be limited to particular subject matter and that a rescission by states are valid, then forty-five applications from states were active as of 1993. Paulsen argues that Congress has had ample direction to call a convention on these grounds.

There has been no definitive determination by the Supreme Court regarding the state convention amendment method, though it has handled several cases and an array of arguments on the scope which Amendments can ultimately affect. The 1939 case Coleman v. Miller, which questioned whether a state legislature could relinquish endorsement of an Amendment pertaining to child labor, decided in part, "the question whether a reasonable time had elapsed since submission of the proposal was a nonjusticiable political question, the kinds of considerations entering into deciding being fit for Congress to evaluate, and the question of the effect of a previous rejection upon a ratification was similarly nonjusticiable, because the 1868 Fourteenth Amendment precedent of congressional determination 'has been accepted.'" The case is seen to stand as authority for the proposition that at least some decisions with respect to the proposal and ratifications of constitutional amendments are exclusively within the purview of Congress, either because they are textually committed to Congress or because the courts lack adequate criteria of determination to pass on them.

== Permissible scope of proposed amendments ==
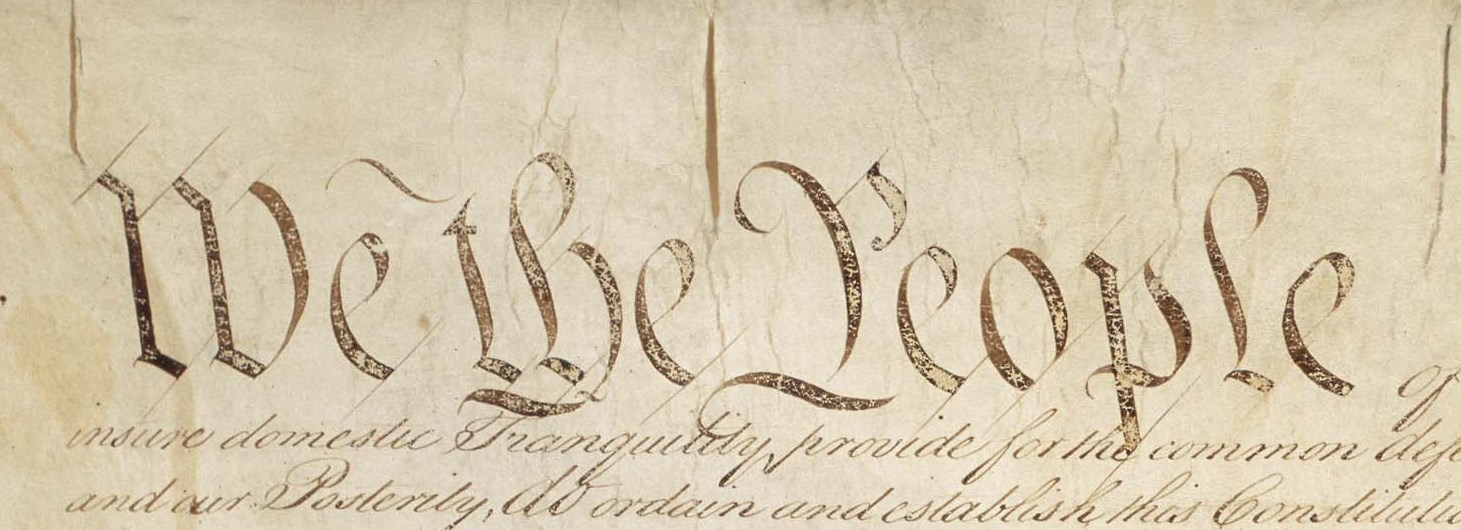
"We the People" in an original edition of the Constitution

Because no Article V convention has ever been convened, there are various questions about how such a convention would function in practice. One major question is whether the scope of the convention's subject matter could be limited.

The language of Article V leaves no discretion to Congress, merely stating that Congress "shall" call a convention when the proper number of state applications have been received. Comments made at the time the Constitution was adopted indicate that it was understood when the Constitution was drafted that Congress would have no discretion. In The Federalist, Alexander Hamilton stated that when the proper number of applications had been received, Congress was "obliged" to call a convention and that "nothing is left to the discretion of Congress." James Madison also affirmed Hamilton's contention that Congress was obligated to call a convention when the requisite number of states requested it.

In the North Carolina debates about ratifying the Constitution, James Iredell, who subsequently became one of the founding members of the Supreme Court, stated that when two-thirds of states have applied to Congress for a convention, Congress is "under the necessity of convening one" and that they have "no option."

By citing the Constitution's Necessary and Proper Clause, Congress has tried to enact a statute to regulate how an Article V convention would function. Sponsored by the late Senator Sam Ervin, such a bill passed the U.S. Senate unanimously in 1971 and again in 1973, but the proposed legislation remained bottled up in the Committee on the Judiciary in the U.S. House of Representatives and died both times. Senator Orrin Hatch made a similar proposal several times in the late 1980s culminating in 1991 with no more success. Opponents to congressional regulation of an Article V convention's operations argue that neither Article I nor Article V of the Constitution grants Congress this power, and that the Founders intended that Congress "have no option." There has been no opportunity for federal courts to decide whether Congress has such authority because such legislation has never been adopted by Congress.

Some scholars believe that states have the power to limit the scope of an Article V convention: Larry Sabato is one scholar who advanced that view. Some feel that Congress's duty to call a convention when requested by the states means that it must call the convention that the states requested. If the states, therefore, request a convention limited to a certain subject matter, then the convention that is called would likely need to be limited in the way the states requested.

If states have the power to limit an Article V convention to a particular subject matter, and Congress only has power to call a convention but no further power to control or regulate it, then a potential concern becomes whether an Article V convention could become a "runaway convention" that attempts to exceed its scope. If a convention did attempt to exceed its scope, none of the amendments it proposed would become part of the constitution until three-fourths of the states ratified them, which is more states than are required to call a convention in the first place. Some proponents of a convention express doubt that an Article V convention would exceed its scope, in light of the United States' experience with state constitutional conventions; over 600 state constitutional conventions have been held to amend state constitutions, with little evidence that any of them have exceeded their scope. This is reinforced by the fact that prior to the 1787 Philadelphia Convention, there were many other conventions of the states (some called by Congress, but most called by the states themselves) where the delegates operated within the scope of their commissions.

Further, at many Conventions, States have directly controlled their delegates. In the New Hampshire Convention to ratify the U.S. Constitution, delegates were sent with instructions to vote against the Constitution: when they were convinced that the voters had been mistaken, the delegates later returned to their constituents to convince them and request new instructions, allowing the convention to represent the true voice of the people.

Similarly, in the 1787 Convention, problems arose after two of New York's delegates walked out in protest, as the New York State Legislature had created a rule that required two delegates to agree to cast a vote on behalf of the state. As the legislature opted not to send new delegates, Alexander Hamilton accepted the authority of the state and was unable to cast a vote for the remainder of the convention. This is the fundamental difference between a Delegate to a Convention, there to do the bidding of their constituents, and a Representative to a Legislature, there to stand in place of their constituents and make decisions based on their own deliberation.

The delegates to the 1787 Constitutional Convention did disregard Congress's recommendation to "solely amend the Articles" but as Madison noted in Federalist No. 40, the resolution Congress passed in February 1787 endorsing the convention was only a recommendation. Regardless, the delegates sent nothing to the States at all, sending their new Constitution to Congress, as was their mandate. Congress debated the matter before voting to send it on to the States for ratification with no recommendation for or against.

== Ability of states to rescind applications to Congress ==
The legislatures of some states have adopted rescissions of their prior applications. It is not clear from the language of Article V whether a subsequent vote to rescind an application is permissible. As discussed above, however, if the purpose of Article V is to give state legislatures power over a recalcitrant Congress—and if state lawmakers may indeed limit their applications by specific subject matter—it is possible that federal courts would hold that rescissions of previous applications are likewise valid, in order to give more meaningful effect to the power which Article V confers upon state legislators.

If it is ultimately adjudicated that a state may not rescind a prior application, then Ohio's 2013 application for a balanced budget amendment convention would be the 33rd and Michigan's 2014 application would be the 34th (out of the necessary 34) on that topic, rather than the 20th and 22nd, respectively. The balanced budget amendment applications by Ohio and Michigan were new, first-time convention applications, whereas the renewed applications from Alabama, Florida, Georgia, Louisiana, New Hampshire, North Dakota, Tennessee, South Dakota, and Utah simply reprised applications made by those states during the 1970s but which had been rescinded during the period between 1988 and 2010.

Those claiming that rescission is impossible often also argue that different topics can be combined during a convention's deliberations. Congress has more than enough applications on a single issue to call a convention—if rescission is not valid—and more than enough applications on multiple topics regardless of rescissions. Consequently, if a State believes that combining topics could be done by Congress, even if a State feels that doing so would be contrary to the intent of the Constitution, then that State would also have to conclude that Congress can ignore rescission.

Since 2016, 10 state legislatures (Delaware in 2016; New Mexico, Maryland, Nevada and Texas all in 2017; South Dakota in 2019; Colorado and New Jersey in 2021, Illinois in 2022, and Oregon in 2023) have rescinded previous applications to call for such a convention.

== Supreme Court interpretations of Article V ==
While the Supreme Court has never definitively interpreted the meaning of Article V, it has, on four occasions, referred to the Article V convention process:

Dodge v. Woolsey, 59 U.S. 331 (1855): "[The people] have directed that amendments should be made representatively for them, by the Congress ...; or where the legislatures of two thirds of the several States shall call a convention for proposing amendments, which, in either case, become valid, to all intents and purposes, as a part of the constitution, when ratified ..."

Hawke v. Smith, 253 U.S. 221 (1920): "[Article V] makes provision for the proposal of amendments either by two-thirds of both houses of Congress or on application of the legislatures of two-thirds of the states, thus securing deliberation and consideration before any change can be proposed. The proposed change can only become effective by the ratification of the legislatures of three-fourths of the states or by conventions in a like number of states. The method of ratification is left to the choice of Congress."

Dillon v. Gloss 256 U.S. 368 (1921): In a ruling upholding Congress's authority to place a deadline on a particular Constitutional amendment's ratification, the Court reaffirmed that "A further mode of proposal—as yet never invoked—is provided, which is that, on the application of two-thirds of the states, Congress shall call a convention for the purpose."

United States v. Sprague, 282 U.S. 716 (1931): "[A]rticle 5 is clear in statement and in meaning, contains no ambiguity and calls for no resort to rules of construction. ... It provides two methods for proposing amendments. Congress may propose them by a vote of two-thirds of both houses, or, on the application of the legislatures of two-thirds of the States, must call a convention to propose them."

Because of the political question doctrine and the Court's ruling in the 1939 case of Coleman v. Miller (307 U.S. 433), it remains an open question whether federal courts could assert jurisdiction over a legal challenge to Congress, if Congress were to refuse to call a convention.

== Attempts to call an Article V convention ==
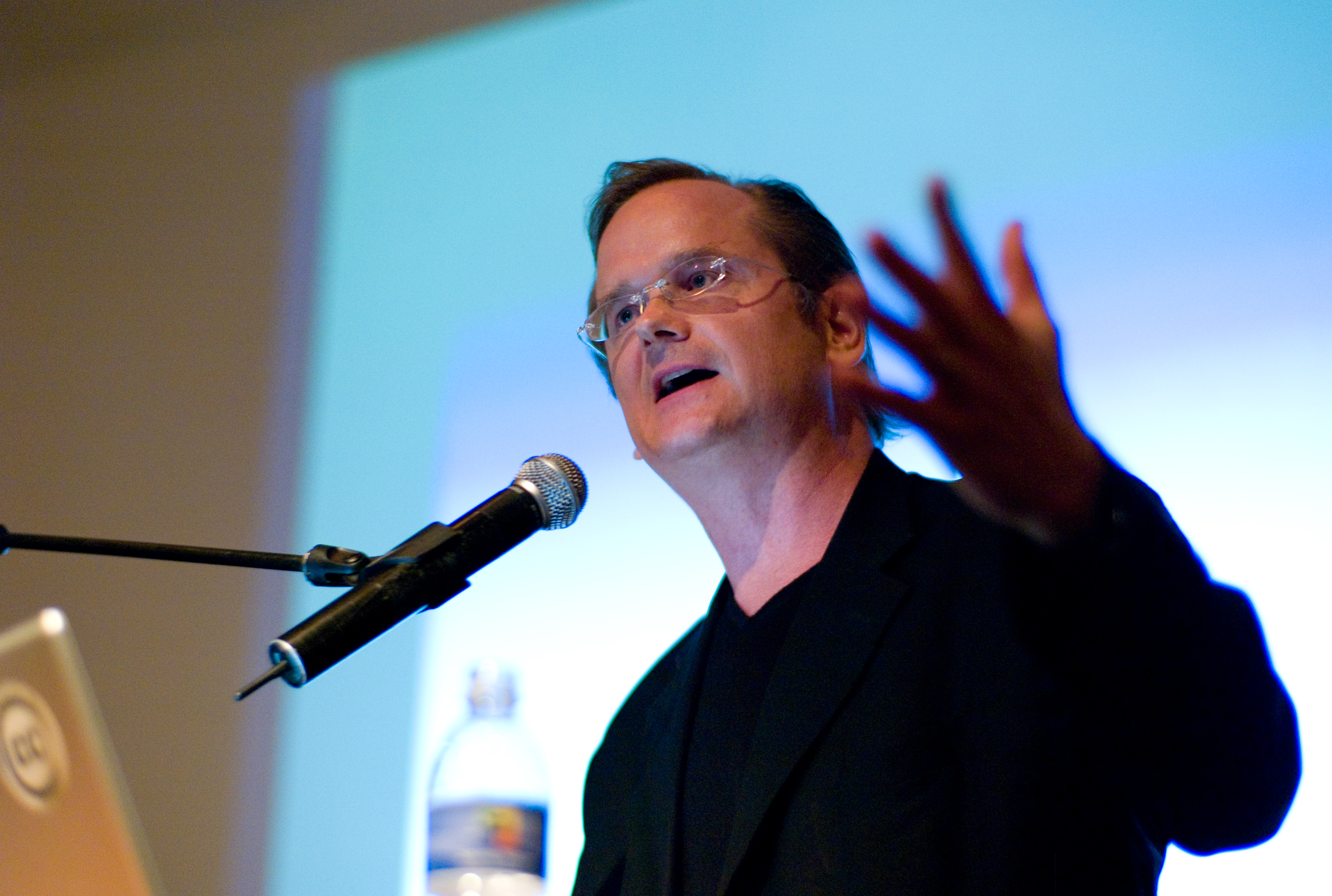
Harvard Law School professor Lawrence Lessig has called for a Second Constitutional Convention of the United States.

Every state except Hawaii has applied for an Article V Convention at one time or another. The majority of such applications were made in the 20th century. Before any official count had been taken, one private count puts the total number of applications at over 700. (Note: The listing, prepared by the Friends of the Article V Convention, a group that believes that Congress has purposefully ignored its mandate to call such a convention, included, as of March 20, 2010, 39 entries where the state legislature rescinded one or more earlier applications.)

Even though the Article V Convention process has never been used to amend the Constitution, the number of states applying for a convention has nearly reached the required threshold several times. Congress has proposed amendments to the Constitution on some occasions, at least in part, because of the threat of an Article V Convention. Rather than risk such a convention taking control of the amendment process away from it, Congress acted pre-emptively to propose the amendments instead. The Bill of Rights, which includes the first ten amendments, as well as the Twenty-seventh Amendment, were proposed in part because of a Convention application by the New York and Virginia legislatures at the suggestion of a letter from the New York State Convention to ratify the Constitution. The convention would have been limited to those changes discussed at the various State ratifying Conventions. At least four other amendments (the Seventeenth, Twenty-First, Twenty-Second, and Twenty-Fifth Amendments) have been identified as being proposed by Congress at least partly in response to the threat of an Article V convention, bringing the total to 15 out of 27, a majority of the Amendments.

=== Direct election of Senators ===
In the late 1890s, the House of Representatives passed multiple resolutions for a constitutional amendment providing for direct election of senators. The Senate refused to consider those resolutions. In 1893, Nebraska filed the first Article V application for direct election of senators. By 1911, 29 states had Article V convention applications on file for an amendment providing for direct election of senators, just two short of the 31-state threshold. (Note: There were only 46 states prior to admission of Arizona and New Mexico in 1912.) As new states were being added the threshold increased, however those States had already passed resolutions supporting such a Convention. The final count is somewhat uncertain, but when either just one or two further states were required, the Senate finally conceded and passed its version of an amendment in May 1911, which was then approved by the House in 1912 and submitted to the states.

=== World federal government ===
In 1949, six states — California, Connecticut, Florida, Maine, New Jersey, and North Carolina — applied for a convention to propose an amendment "to enable the participation of the United States in a world federal government." Multiple other state legislatures introduced or debated the same proposal. These resolutions were part of an effort at the time to integrate the United States into a potential world government.

=== Congressional apportionment ===
There have been two nearly successful attempts to amend the Constitution via an Article V Convention since the late 1960s. The first try was an attempt to propose an amendment that would overturn two Supreme Court decisions, Wesberry v. Sanders and Reynolds v. Sims, decisions that required states to adhere to the one man, one vote principle in drawing electoral districts for state and federal elections. The attempt fell only one state short of reaching the 34 needed to force Congress to call a convention in 1969, but ended by the death of its main promoter Senator Everett Dirksen. After this peak, several states (whose legislatures by this point had been re-engineered in the wake of the rulings) rescinded their applications, and interest in the proposed amendment subsided.

=== Balanced budget ===
In response to increasing federal deficits, a movement in the 1970s by the states to impose fiscal discipline on the federal government began. Between 1975 and 1979, thirty states petitioned Congress for a convention to write a balanced budget amendment. By 1983, the number of applications had reached 32, only two states short of the 34 needed to force such a convention. In addition, at least four states (California, Illinois, Kentucky, and Montana) had adopted resolutions requesting that Congress propose a deficit spending amendment. California and Montana were set to hold ballot initiatives that would have forced their legislatures to file convention applications, but state courts ruled the two ballot initiatives unconstitutional, and the effort stalled. Enthusiasm for the amendment subsided in response to fears that an Article V Convention could not be limited to a single subject and because Congress passed the Gramm–Rudman–Hollings Balanced Budget Act in 1985 (the act was overturned by the Supreme Court in 1986 but Congress enacted a reworked version of the law in 1987). By 1988, two states (Alabama and Florida) had rescinded their applications on the topic of a federal balanced budget amendment. Similar rescissions were approved in Louisiana (1990), Oregon (1999), Idaho (2000), Utah, (2001), North Dakota (2001) Wyoming (2001), Arizona (2003) and Georgia (2004).

On November 20, 2013, the Ohio General Assembly applied to Congress for a convention to propose a balanced budget amendment. This effort made Ohio the 21st state to join a push for a national convention of states. On March 26, 2014, the Michigan Legislature applied to Congress for a convention to propose a balanced budget amendment, making Michigan the 22nd to participate in the national effort. On April 27, 2016, the Oklahoma Senate approved an Article V convention on a balanced budget amendment, making Oklahoma the 29th state to participate in the national effort. On November 7, 2017, the Wisconsin Legislature approved an Article V convention resolution for a balanced budget amendment.

=== Campaign finance ===
A political action committee called Wolf-PAC emerged from New York's Occupy Wall Street movement in October 2011. Wolf-PAC calls for a convention of states in order to propose a constitutional amendment that addresses the issue of campaign finance. The resolution reads "Corporations are not people. They have none of the Constitutional rights of human beings. Corporations are not allowed to give money to any politician, directly or indirectly. No politician can raise over $100 from any person or entity. All elections must be publicly financed."

As of 2022, Wolf-PAC's application had been adopted in three states: California and Vermont in 2014; and Rhode Island in 2016. New Jersey and Illinois previously adopted the application in 2014, but rescinded it in 2021 and 2022, respectively.

=== Convention of States Project ===
Convention of States map (20) Passed Convention of States Resolution (3) Passed One Chamber (10) Active Legislation (17) No Action

The conservative group Citizens for Self-Governance (CSG) is engaged in an ongoing effort to call an Article V Convention. Through its "Convention of States Project", CSG is seeking "to urge and empower state legislators to call a convention of states." CSG states that it initiated the Convention of States project "for the purpose of stopping the runaway power of the federal government." (Note: Attributed to multiple sources:) Mark Levin has supported CSG's efforts to a call a convention for the purpose of proposing amendments to the constitution.

In December 2013, nearly 100 legislators from 32 states met at Mount Vernon to talk about how to call a convention of states. According to Slate, "The meeting lasted four hours, ending when legislators agreed to meet again in the spring of 2014. That’s the most progress anyone’s made in decades toward a states-first constitutional amendment campaign."

In February 2014, U.S. Senator Tom Coburn announced that after his retirement from Congress, he would focus on promoting the Convention of States to state legislatures. In December 2015, Marco Rubio endorsed CSG's efforts to a call an Article V Convention. In January 2016, Texas Governor Greg Abbott called for a Convention of States to restrict the power of the federal government. In June 2017, former U.S. Senator and former Heritage Foundation president Jim DeMint announced his role as a senior adviser for the Convention of States project.

In September 2016, CSG held a simulated convention to propose amendments to the United States Constitution in Williamsburg, Virginia. An assembly of 137 delegates representing every state gathered to conduct a simulated convention. The simulated convention passed amendments relating to six topics, including requiring the states to approve any increase in the national debt, imposing term limits, restricting the scope of the Commerce Clause, limiting the power of federal regulations, requiring a supermajority to impose federal taxes and repealing the 16th Amendment, and giving the states the power to abrogate any federal law, regulation, or executive order. In August 2023, CSG held a simulated Article V convention in Williamsburg.

As of February 2026, CSG's application for a Convention of States had been passed in 20 states. 34 states are required for a convention to be called.

=== Single Subject Amendment PAC ===
A Super PAC called Single Subject Amendment registered with the Federal Election Commission on March 1, 2013. It is actively engaged in an effort to call an Article V Convention for the limited purpose of proposing an amendment to provide every law enacted by Congress shall embrace only one subject which shall be clearly expressed in the bill's title. Forty-one state constitutions have a single subject provision but this provision is not in the United States Constitution. In April 2014, Florida became the first state to make an application for an Article V Convention to constitutionally prohibit unrelated riders in Congress.

=== Aggregation strategy ===
Some Article V convention proponents have proposed aggregating unrelated applications, including aggregating plenary convention and balanced budget applications, to reach the 34-state threshold necessary to call a convention. In 2021–2022, resolutions advocating for such an approach were introduced in Georgia, Mississippi, South Carolina, and Utah. Additionally, legislation was introduced in the 117th Congress to convene a convention by aggregating state applications.

An alternative proposal is to amend the constitution to allow the states to ratify amendments asynchronously, of their own initiative.

According to Common Cause, 28 states have called for a convention in aggregate, which means that only six additional states would trigger a convention.

=== Gun control ===
On June 8, 2023, Gavin Newsom proposed a 28th amendment to the constitution to address gun control (SJR-7), specifically by raising the minimum age to purchase firearms to 21, instituting universal background checks for firearm purchases, requiring mandatory waiting periods, and banning assault weapons. He proposed having an Article V convention to address this amendment. In September, the California State Legislature formally applied for an Article V convention proposing such an amendment. The language of the bill states that the application would become null and void if any other topic is discussed at the convention other than this one on firearms.

=== Term limits ===
Since 2016, U.S. Term Limits has called for an Article V Convention with the limited purpose of imposing term limits on Congress. Resolutions calling for such a convention have been passed by the state legislatures of Florida, Alabama, Missouri, West Virginia, Wisconsin, Oklahoma, and Tennessee.

== See also ==
- Constituent assembly
- Democratic backsliding in the United States
- Federal Convention (disambiguation)
- Intergovernmental Conference
- List of state applications for an Article V Convention
- Second Constitutional Convention of the United States

== Bibliography ==
- Paulsen, Michael (1993). "A General Theory of Article V: The Constitutional Lessons of the Twenty-Seventh Amendment". Yale Law Journal. 103 (3): 677–789. doi:10.2307/797083. JSTOR 797083.
- Paulsen, Michael (2011). "How to Count to Thirty-Four: The Constitutional Case for a Constitutional Convention". Harvard Journal of Law and Public Policy. 34: 837. SSRN 1856719.
- Rogers, James (2007). "The Other Way to Amend the Constitution: The Article V Constitutional Convention Amendment Process" (PDF). Harvard Journal of Law and Public Policy. 30: 1005.
