= Rick Wilborn =

American politician

Vice President of the Kansas Senate
- In office January 11, 2021 – January 10, 2025
- Preceded by: Jeff Longbine
- Succeeded by: Tim Shallenburger

Member of the Kansas Senate from the 35th district
- In office January 12, 2015 – January 13, 2025
- Preceded by: Clark Shultz
- Succeeded by: T. J. Rose

Member of the Kansas House of Representatives from the 73rd district
- Incumbent
- Assumed office January 13, 2025
- Preceded by: Lori Schultz

Personal details
- Born: February 10, 1945 (age 81)
- Party: Republican
- Spouse: Pam Wilborn
- Children: 2
- Education: Kansas State University (BA)
- Website: Campaign website

Richard E. Wilborn (born February 10, 1945) is an American politician from the state of Kansas. He served as a Republican member of the Kansas Senate, representing the 35th district from 2015 to 2025. In 2024, he was elected to the Kansas House of Representatives from the 73rd district.

== Early life ==
Wilborn graduated from Kansas State University, and has resided in McPherson, Kansas, for over 45 years.

== Political positions ==
Wilborn opposes abortion, gun control, Obamacare and left-leaning policies.

Kansas Senate
Preceded by Jeff Longbine	Vice President of the Kansas Senate; 2021–2025	Succeeded by Tim Shallenburger
