= U.S. Term Limits =

Organization

- Founded at: Washington D.C.
- Purpose: Term limits
- Region served: United States
- Methods: Referendums; Article V Convention; Grassroots campaigns
- Key people: Philip Blumel (president); Nick Tomboulides (executive director)
- Website: termlimits.com

U.S. Term Limits (USTL) is a non-profit, non-partisan grassroots organization dedicated to enacting term limits for elected officials at every level of government in the United States. The organization was founded in 1992 and says it has helped facilitate more than 500 successful term limits initiatives at various levels of government.

Among other activities, USTL supports statewide ballot initiatives to impose term limits. In the early 1990s, USTL organized grassroots campaigns that placed term limits on the congressional delegations of 23 states. These were overturned as unconstitutional in 1995 by the Supreme Court, in a 5–4 decision in U.S. Term Limits v. Thornton.

U.S. Term Limits is promoting a convention to propose amendments under Article V of the U.S. Constitution, focused specifically on a term limits amendment. Resolutions calling for such a convention have been passed by the state legislatures of Florida, Alabama, Missouri, West Virginia, Wisconsin, Oklahoma, Tennessee, Louisiana, North Carolina, South Dakota, Indiana, South Carolina, and Arizona. This is 14 of the 34 states required to call for a convention.

Additionally, a resolution have been passed by the Georgia State Senate. However, the resolution must be passed by both houses of the state legislature to take effect.
