= Kansas's 35th Senate district =

American legislative district

Kansas's 35th State Senate district
Senator
T. J. Rose; R–Olathe
- Demographics: 90% White; 1% Black; 5% Hispanic; 1% Asian; 2% Other
- Population (2018): 68,253

Kansas's 35th Senate district is one of 40 districts in the Kansas Senate. It has been represented by Republican T. J. Rose since the 2024 Kansas Senate election.

== Geography ==
District 35 covers the rural geographical center of the state to the north of Wichita, including all of Chase, Ellsworth, Marion, McPherson, and Morris Counties and parts of Dickinson and Rice Counties. Communities in the district include McPherson, Hillsboro, Ellsworth, Lyons, Lindsborg, Sterling, Marion, Council Grove, Herington, and Moundridge.

The district is located entirely within Kansas's 1st congressional district, and overlaps with the 68th, 70th, 73rd, 74th, 108th, 113th, and 114th districts of the Kansas House of Representatives.

== Recent election results ==
=== 2024 ===
2024 Kansas Senate election, District 35
Party	Candidate	Votes	%
Republican	T. J. Rose	23,088	52.8
Democratic	Jason Anderson	20,664	47.2
Total votes		43,752	100
Republican hold			

=== 2020 ===
2020 Kansas Senate election, District 35
Party	Candidate	Votes	%
Republican	Rick Wilborn (incumbent)	28,779	100
Total votes		28,779	100
Republican hold			

=== 2016 ===
2016 Kansas Senate election, District 35
Party	Candidate	Votes	%
Republican	Rick Wilborn (incumbent)	21,271	71.4
Democratic	Levi Morris	8,538	28.6
Total votes		29,809	100
Republican hold			

=== 2014 special ===
2014 Kansas Senate special election, District 35
Primary election
Party	Candidate	Votes	%
Republican	Rick Wilborn	3,949	40.1
Republican	Donald Hobson	2,851	28.9
Republican	Marshall Christmann	1,646	16.7
Republican	James Toews	884	8.9
Republican	Nick Reinecker	517	5.2
Total votes		9,847	100
General election
Republican	Rick Wilborn	20,149	100
Total votes		20,149	100
Republican hold			

=== 2012 ===
2012 Kansas Senate election, District 35
Primary election
Party	Candidate	Votes	%
Republican	Jay Emler (incumbent)	6,435	73.3
Republican	Jesse Bryant	2,346	26.7
Total votes		8,781	100
General election
Republican	Jay Emler (incumbent)	21,063	76.7
Libertarian	Jesse Bryant	6,381	23.3
Total votes		27,444	100
Republican hold			

=== Federal and statewide results ===
Year	Office	Results
2020	President	Trump 71.9 – 25.8%
2018	Governor	Kobach 52.0 – 37.6%
2016	President	Trump 70.2 – 23.0%
2012	President	Romney 70.4 – 27.1%
