= 2026 Kansas Secretary of State election =

- November 3, 2026
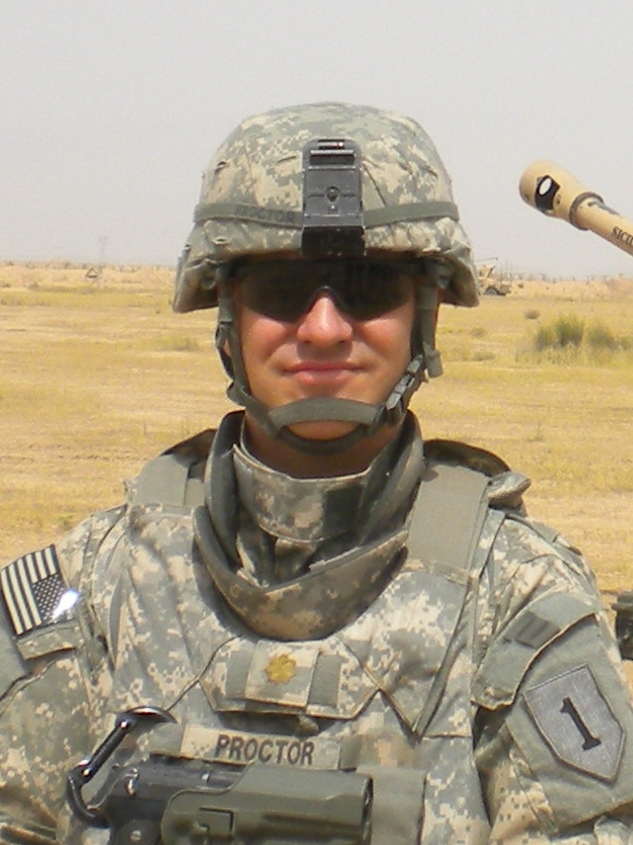

Nominee	Pat Proctor	Jennifer Day	Scott Morgan
Party	Republican	Democratic	United Kansas
Popular vote	523,937	514,512	45,942
Percentage	48.3%	47.4%	4.2%
- Proctor: 40–50% 50–60% 60–70% 70–80% 80–90% Day: 40–50% 50–60% 60–70% 70–80%
Secretary of State before election
Scott Schwab
Republican
Elected Secretary of State
Pat Proctor
Republican

The 2026 Kansas Secretary of State election was held on November 3, 2026, to elect the Secretary of State of Kansas. Incumbent Republican Scott Schwab retired to run for governor.

== Republican primary ==
=== Candidates ===
==== Nominee ====
- Pat Proctor, state representative from the 41st district (2021–present)

==== Withdrawn ====
- Ken Rahjes, state representative from the 110th district (2016–present) (running for lieutenant governor)

==== Declined ====
- Scott Schwab, incumbent Secretary of State (running for governor)

=== Results ===
Republican primary results
Party	Candidate	Votes	%
Republican	Pat Proctor	266,853	100.0
Total votes		266,853	100.0

== Democratic primary ==
=== Candidates ===
==== Nominee ====
- Jennifer Day, former state representative from the 48th district (2020–2021)

==== Eliminated in primary ====
- Samuel Lane, construction inspector

==== Endorsements ====
Jennifer Day

State officials

- Laura Kelly, governor of Kansas (2019–present)

State representatives

- Brandon Woodard, minority leader of the Kansas House of Representatives (2025–present) from the 30th district (2019–present) and minority leader

=== Results ===
Primary results by county: Day: 50–60%; 60–70%; 70–80%; 80–90%; >90%

Democratic primary results
Party	Candidate	Votes	%
Democratic	Jennifer Day	176,899	85.3
Democratic	Samuel Lane	30,467	14.7
Total votes		207,366	100.0

== Third-party and independent candidates ==
=== Declared ===
- Scott E. Morgan (United Kansas), former Lawrence school board member

== General election ==
=== Predictions ===
Source	Ranking	As of
Sabato's Crystal Ball	Lean R	October 29, 2026

=== Endorsements ===
Scott Morgan (UK)

Political parties

- Forward Party

=== Polling ===
Poll source	Date(s) administered	Sample size (Note: Key: A – all adults RV – registered voters LV – likely voters V – unclear)	Margin of error	Pat Proctor (R)	Jennifer Day (D)	Undecided
Public Policy Polling (D) (Note: Poll sponsored by Day's campaign)	August 31 – September 1, 2026	542 (RV)	–	39%	37%	24%

==== Results ====
2026 Kansas Secretary of State election results
Party	Candidate	Votes	%	±%
Republican	Pat Proctor	523,937	48.3	−10.1
Democratic	Jennifer Day	514,512	47.4	+8.6
United Kansas	Scott Morgan	45,942	4.2	N/A
Total votes		1,084,391	100.0	

== See also ==
- 2026 United States secretary of state elections

== Notes ==
Partisan clients
