= National Plan for Hispanic Ministry =

The National Plan for Hispanic Ministry

The 1988 General Conference of the United Methodist Church (UMC), the highest legislative body of the organization, authorized the development of a comprehensive national plan for Hispanic ministries, but first a committee to gather information about demographic changes and trends, and ministerial needs of 320 Hispanic congregations in the country was formed. The National Hispanic Ministries Committee, headed by Bishop Elias Gabriel Galvan of Phoenix, Arizona, drafted a recommendation that was presented at the 1992 General Conference of the United Methodist Church for approval. The church, upon seeing the significance of reaching out to the growing number of Hispanic/Latinos in the mainland U.S., approved the establishment of the National Plan for Hispanic/Latino Ministry.

== Early accomplishments ==
There were 38 conferences in the US and Puerto Rico involved in some Hispanic/Latino ministry when the National Plan for Hispanic/Latino Ministry began in 1993. By 1999, 61 Annual Conferences (AC) joined in. To encourage the church and to push ahead with this growing ministry, it was reported in the 2000 General Conference through the General Board of Global Ministries that there were very significant Annual Conference involvements in new and strengthened Hispanic ministries across the board.

At the UMC's General Conference gathering in 2000, the church approved a total of $2.8 million intended to assist churches in the UMC to implement the program. By 2002 Annual Conferences reported 75 newly chartered churches and other ministries. Still, according to Rev. Saul Trinidad, the interim coordinator of the national plan for the quadrennial 2004–2008, the Hispanic population needs new models to develop ministries that address the socioeconomic, cultural and linguistic characteristics of the people.

== Recent developments ==
In a workshop facilitated by the Rev. Francisco Cañas, the national coordinator for the National Plan for Hispanic/Latino Ministry in the California-Pacific Conference, he explained why reaching out to the Latino population is a priority. He lists these major points.

- The United States is the 3rd country having the largest Latino population after Brazil and México. In July 2007, there were 45.5 million documented Latinos in the US.
- 18 million reside in the Western Jurisdiction alone, the largest concentration of Latinos in any Jurisdiction.
- California has the biggest concentration having 13.2 million Latinos, a third of California's population.
- There are only 25 Hispanic elders and 13 local pastors in the entire California-Pacific Conference.

== What lies ahead ==
In 2009, according to the U.S. Census Bureau there were more than 48 million Hispanics in the U.S. Another report foresees the Hispanic or Latino population rising from 16% today to 30% by 2050. There is no doubt ministry to Hispanic populations should be one of the greater priorities of any church in the U.S. if that church wants to become a vital part of society in the future. Yet churches are often unsure of how to deal with immigration and the problems of immigrant communities. For instance, almost a quarter of the Hispanic/Latino population which are illegal aliens and if churches truly want to serve and welcome “the strangers among their midst,” this is one issue which must be faced. Among U.S. Christians, there is much quandary as to how to do this. For instance, Evangelical Christians were asked, by Christianity Today, how illegal aliens should be dealt with. A whopping 82% know that the Bible verses on “welcoming the stranger” (Matthew 25:31-46) has much to do with how we should deal with immigrants. However, within that same group, were varying opinions regarding how to deal with illegal immigration. Fifty four (54%) percent said the government should adopt policies giving illegal immigrants a better “path to citizenship” while 31% say there should be blanket amnesty while 15% say the current laws have to be enforced. The issue of illegal immigrants and how U.S. Christians think of the issue reflects the general uncertainty around the more general issue of changing demographics and the role churches will play in the lives of these people.
