= United Kansas =

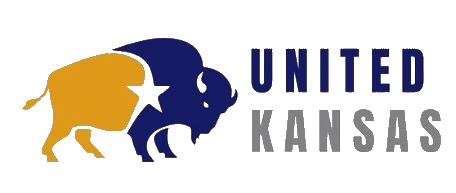
- Chairperson: Jack Curtis
- Founded: 2024
- Ideology: Fusion voting
- Political position: Center
- Colors: Orange
- Slogan: One Vision, One Kansas

Website
- unitedkansas.com

United Kansas: The Free State Party (also known as United Kansas in short) is a minor political party in the U.S. state of Kansas. United Kansas was founded in 2024 by Jack Curtis, who currently chairs the party. Other party leadership includes Sally Cauble, a Republican who formerly served on the Kansas State Board of Education, and Aaron Estabrook, an independent who served on the Manhattan City Commission. United Kansas advocates for fusion voting, nominating existing Republican or Democratic candidates.

== History ==
On May 24, 2024, Kansas Secretary of State Scott Schwab declared that United Kansas had met the requirements to become officially recognized as a political party in Kansas. They collected 35,152 signatures, greater than the requisite 2% of total votes in the previous gubernatorial election. United Kansas joined No Labels Kansas and the Libertarian Party as a minor political party in Kansas.

In United Kansas's first year as an official party, they nominated three candidates for the Kansas House and Kansas Senate. These included Lori Blake, a Democrat running for the 69th Kansas House district, J.C. Moore, a Republican running for the 26th Kansas Senate district, and Jason Probst, the incumbent representative for the 102nd Kansas House district. Additionally, they nominated two candidates for the Leavenworth City Commission.

Chairman Jack Curtis said that the party's organizers were interested in recreating fusion voting in Kansas, "an idea that would enable United Kansas to cross-nominate Republican or Democratic candidates".

In April 2026, United Kansas merged with the Free State Party, an unofficial party pursuing ballot access. The executive committee will have an equal number of members from the United Kansas and Free State parties. Executive director Scott Morgan said the party will not require candidates to adhere to a strict platform but would expect candidates to share "broad principles," such as support for electoral reform (including ranked-choice voting), environmentalism, reasonable gun rights and regulations, and strong border immigration policies as well as a pathway to citizenship. The party expressed intent to contest uncontested races in an effort to break the Republican supermajority in the 2026 midterm elections.

The party nominated Scott Morgan, cofounder of the Free State Party, for the 2026 Kansas Secretary of State election.
