= Air Assault Task Force =

2006 video game

- Developer(s): ProSIM Company
- Publisher(s): Shrapnel Games
- Designer(s): Pat Proctor
- Platform(s): Microsoft Windows
- Release: November 17, 2006
- Genre(s): Wargame
- Mode(s): Single-player, Multiplayer

Air Assault Task Force is a computer wargame developed by ProSIM Company and published by Shrapnel Games. The lead developer was ProSIM Company founder, Pat Proctor. Other developers included Gary Bezant and Curt Pangracs.

Air Assault Task Force is a combat simulator and includes four campaigns, set at the Joint Readiness Training Center at Fort Polk, LA, at LZ X-Ray during the Vietnam War, in the ill-fated Ranger raid in Mogadishu, Somalia (the famous "Black Hawk Down" incident), and Operation Anaconda during Operation Enduring Freedom in Afghanistan. The game built on the pausable real-time gameplay of ProSIM's BCT Commander and the AI and hierarchy system of Armored Task Force. In addition to a major upgrade to these earlier game systems, it also includes a graphical and GUI overhaul that makes the game's graphics better.

In 2007, defense contractor Boeing commissioned ProSIM to create a custom version of the game for use as a ground combat simulator, to be paired with an intelligent tutor and after-action review agent application developed by Boeing.
