= Dan Osman (Kansas politician) =

American politician

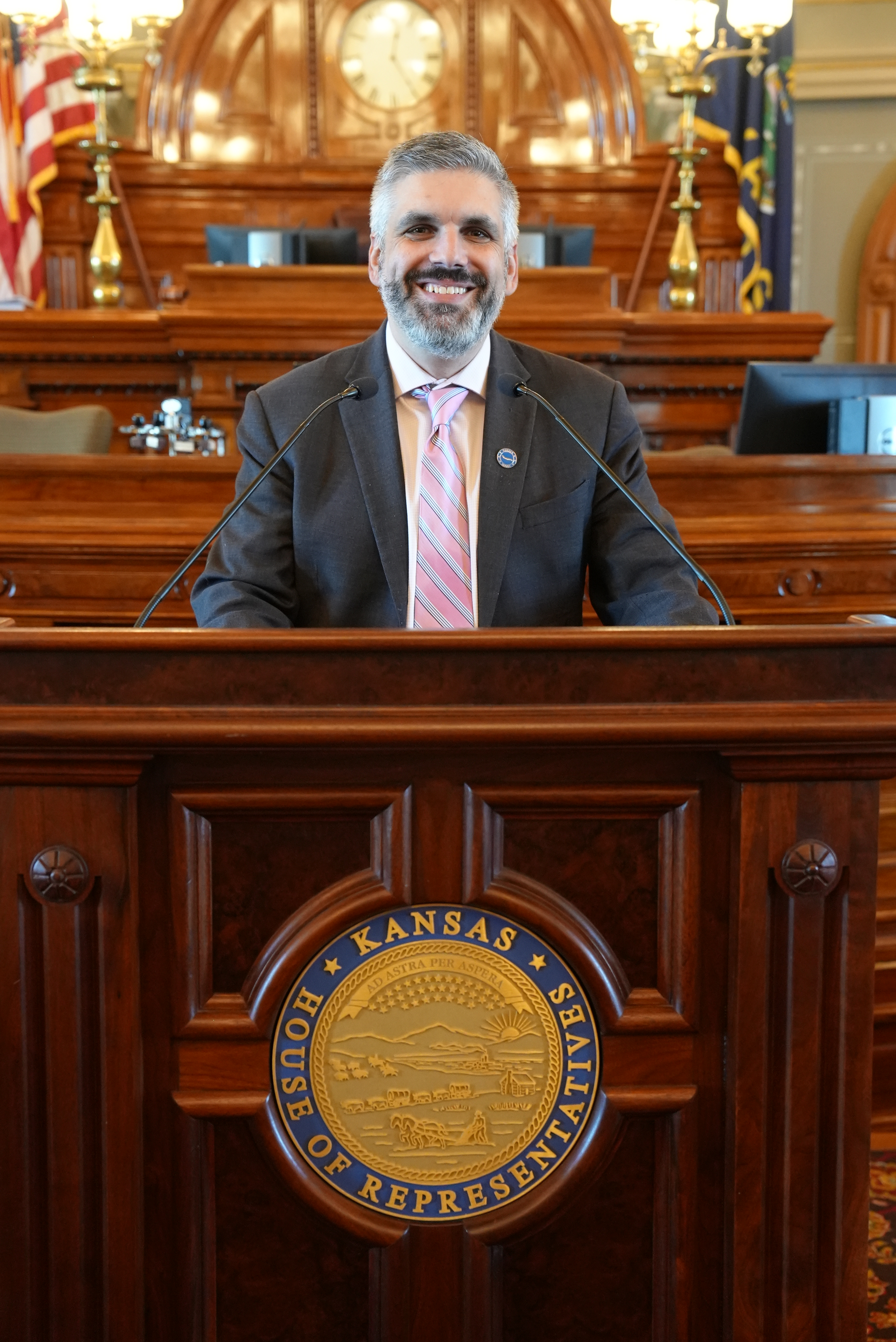

Member of the Kansas House of Representatives from the 48th district
- Incumbent
- Assumed office July 7, 2021
- Preceded by: Jennifer Day

Personal details
- Born: Overland Park, Kansas
- Party: Democratic
- Education: University of Wisconsin-Madison (BA); University of Kansas (JD)

Dan Osman is an American politician and attorney who serves as a member of the Kansas House of Representatives representing the 48th district in Johnson County, Kansas since July 7, 2021. Osman was reelected in the 2022 Kansas State House Elections.

== Early life and education ==
Osman was born in Overland Park, Kansas. He attended Hyman Brand Hebrew Academy until eighth grade, then graduated from the Shawnee Mission School District. Representative Osman is an attorney and graduate of the University of Kansas School of Law.

== Career ==
Osman previously served on the Hickman Mills Board of Education in Kansas City, Missouri, including as vice president of the board. He was previously a prosecutor in Jackson County, Missouri. Representative Osman unsuccessfully sought a seat on the Overland Park City Council in 2019.

He was elected by Democratic Party committee members in the 48th district on July 7, 2021, to complete the term of former Rep. Jennifer Day who resigned in June 2021. The 48th district includes parts of Overland Park.

Since his election to the Kansas House of Representatives, Osman has served on the committees for Commerce, Labor, and Economic Development; Judiciary; and Fiduciary Financial Institutions Oversight. Osman ran for reelection in 2022, and won. He stated later that he planned on running for reelection in 2024.

2022 Kansas House of Representatives District 48
Party	Candidate	Votes	%
Democratic	Dan Osman (incumbent)	5,161	51.33
Republican	Terry Frederick	4,894	48.67

== Personal life ==
Osman lives in Overland Park with his family. Osman is Jewish.

Kansas House of Representatives
Preceded by Jennifer Day	Member of the Kansas House of Representatives for the 48th District; July 7, 2021 - Present	Succeeded by Incumbent
