= Immigration policy of the Biden administration =

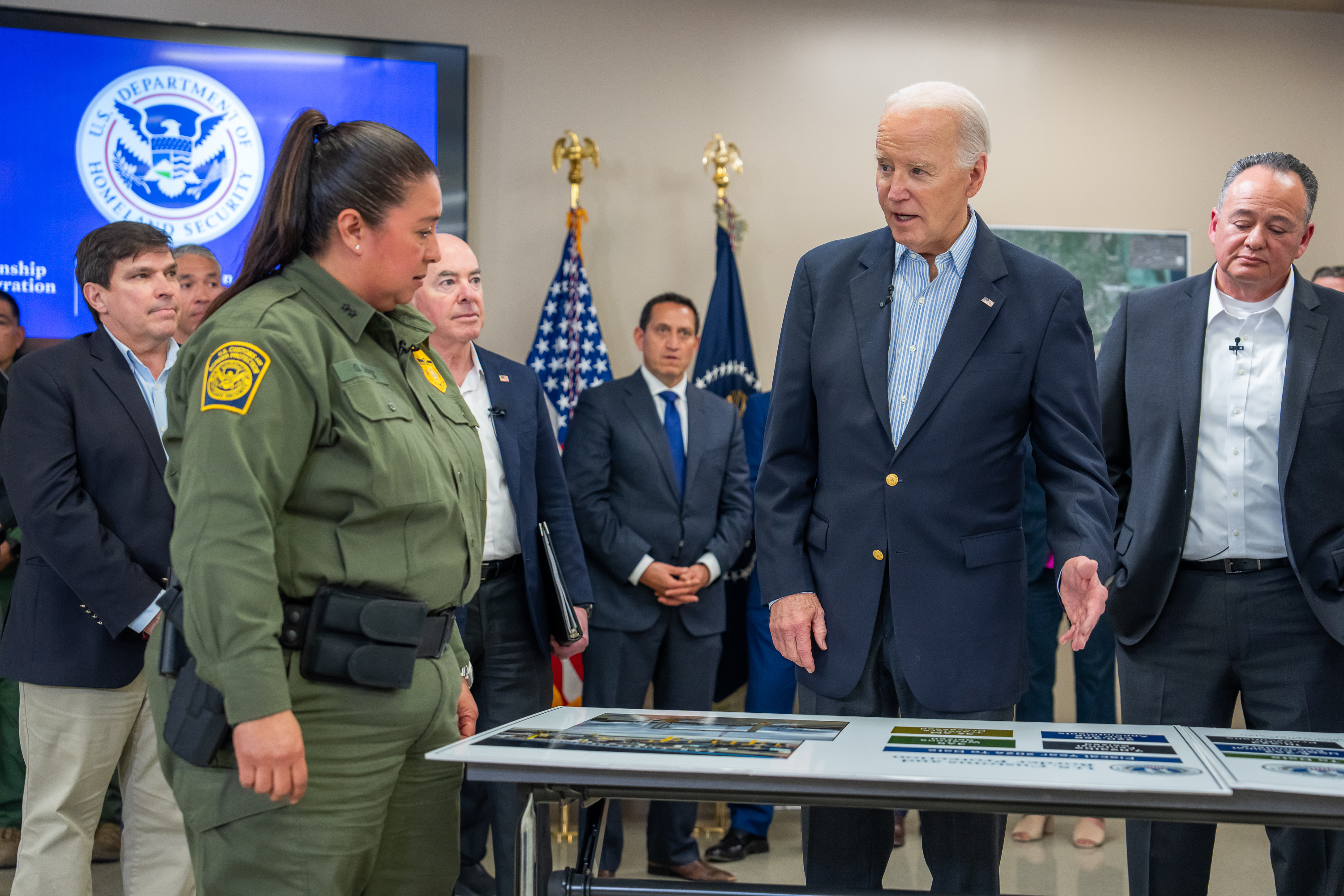
President Joe Biden receives an operational briefing from U.S. Border Patrol, USCIS and ICE at the Brownsville Border Patrol Station on February 29, 2024.

The immigration policy of the Biden administration initially focused on reversing many of the immigration policies of the previous Trump administration and expanding legal pathways. It later focused on efforts to restrict unlawful entry amid rising border crossings.

On his first day in office, Biden unveiled the U.S. Citizenship Act of 2021, which would provide a pathway to citizenship for as many as 11 million immigrants living in the United States illegally. Upon taking office, Biden moved to dismantle several policies implemented under Donald Trump, halting construction of the Mexico–United States border wall, ending Trump's travel ban on countries with predominantly Muslim populations, and signing an executive order to reaffirm protections for DACA recipients. The Department of Homeland Security, under the leadership of Alejandro Mayorkas, narrowed the scope of interior immigration enforcement, directing Immigration and Customs Enforcement (ICE) to prioritize national security and violent crime concerns over petty and nonviolent offenses. The administration also attempted to terminate the Remain in Mexico policy.

The administration also ended or revised policies limiting asylum eligibility and expanded the use of humanitarian protections such as Temporary Protected Status (TPS) and DACA. In January 2023, Biden announced a humanitarian parole program to increase the admission of immigrants from Cuba, Haiti, Nicaragua, and Venezuela, while also announcing that his administration would crack down on those who fail to use the plan's legal pathway and strengthen border security. Nearly 530,000 migrants took advantage of the parole program as of August 2024. Biden also launched the CBP One app in January 2023, allowing over 813,000 migrants to enter the country and schedule asylum appointments online, as of August 2024.

Between January 2021 and January 2024, US Border Patrol confirmed more than 7.2 million illegal migrants trying to cross the US-Mexico border, not counting gotaways. 2023 was a record year with over 2.5 million encounters. In response to sustained high levels of migration and growing political pressure, the administration implemented stricter measures beginning in 2023. Biden faced criticism from immigration advocates for extending Title 42, a Trump administration border restriction that arose due to the COVID-19 pandemic, as well as restarting the use of "expedited removal" of certain Central American families. In May 2023, the Biden Administration approved sending 1,500 more troops to the U.S.-Mexico border following Title 42's expiration.

On June 4, 2024, Biden signed A Proclamation on Securing the Border to shut down the border if illegal crossings reached an average of 2,500 migrants a day in a given week. Migrant encounters subsequently dropped down to 2020 levels.

== Background ==
Over 86 million people have immigrated to the U.S. legally since 1783. Immigration policies have changed from president to president. There are significant differences between the immigration policies of the two major political parties, the Democratic Party and Republican Party.

Immigration to the United States is the international movement of non-U.S. nationals in order to reside permanently in the country. Immigration has been a major source of population growth and cultural change throughout much of U.S. history.

== Immigration policy ==
=== Border wall ===
Presidential Proclamation 10141 – Ending Discriminatory Bans on Entry to the United States

On January 20, 2021, soon after his inauguration, Biden halted construction on the Mexico–United States border wall, ending the national emergency declared by the Trump administration in February 2019.

=== Travel ban ===
Biden also ended the Trump travel ban, a set of three executive orders issued by Donald Trump restricting entry into the United States from 14 countries, most of which had majority-Muslim populations.

=== Deferred Action for Childhood Arrivals ===
Biden reaffirmed protections to DACA recipients and urged Congress to enact permanent protections for the 700,069 illegal immigrants benefited by the policy.

=== Deferred Enforced Departure ===
==== Liberia ====
The same day, Biden sent a memorandum to the Department of State reinstating Deferred Enforced Departure (DED) for Liberians, deferring the deportation of any "person without nationality who last habitually resided in Liberia, who is present in the United States and who was under a grant of DED as of January 10, 2021" until June 30, 2022. It was later extended to June 30, 2026.

==== Hong Kong ====
On August 5, 2021, Biden instituted 18 months of Deferred Enforced Departure for certain Hong Kong residents who were present in the U.S. on August 5, 2021. On January 15, 2025, Biden instituted 24 months of Deferred Enforced Departure for Hong Kong residents who were present in the U.S. as of January 15, 2025, as well as Hong Kong residents already covered under the previous Deferred Enforced Departure. It is scheduled to end on February 5, 2027.

==== Lebanon ====
On July 26, 2024, Biden instituted 18 months of Deferred Enforced Departure for certain nationals of Lebanon who were in the U.S. on July 26, 2024, and have continuously lived in the U.S. since then. As scheduled, it ended on January 25, 2026.

=== Deportations ===
US southwest border encounters throughout Biden's term in office

In context, as a proportion of U.S. population, the number of nationwide border encounters have previously reached levels comparable to those experienced during Biden's administration.

The administration also issued a pause on deportations from the Department of Homeland Security for the first 100 days of Biden's presidency.

On January 22, 2021, Texas Attorney General Ken Paxton sued the Biden administration on the grounds of violating Biden's written pledge to cooperatively work with the State of Texas.

On January 26, 2021, federal judge Drew B. Tipton blocked the Biden administration's 100-day deportation memorandum, citing that the state of Texas would indeed "suffer imminent and irreparable harm" and the restraining order requested by Paxton would not harm the administration nor the public.

In July 2021, Biden resumed "expedited removal" of certain Central American families to be sent back in weeks instead of years. In January 2022 the Biden administration deported Venezuelan migrants to Colombia without a chance to seek asylum after entering the United States from Mexico. The U.S. Department of Homeland Security declared it would deport Venezuelans to Colombia “on a regular basis", limited to migrants that resided in Colombia previously.

In October, the Biden administration invoked Title 42, a Trump era measure, to expel Venezuelan migrants to Mexico. Amnesty International and Human Rights Watch criticized the decision. On November 15, 2022, the United States District Court for the District of Columbia ruled that expulsions under Title 42 were a violation of the Administrative Procedure Act and that it was an “arbitrary and capricious" violation of the Act. The ruling required the United States government to process all asylum seekers under immigrant law as previous to Title 42's implementation. The ruling was celebrated by the ACLU, a plaintiff in the case. In response to the ruling, a group of states seeking to keep the policy in place appealed to the U.S. Supreme Court, and on December 19, 2022, Chief Justice John Roberts temporarily maintained Title 42 and stayed the decision by Judge Emmet G. Sullivan. In the year after Title 42 ended, the Biden administration deported more people than in any year since 2010.

As of February 2024, Biden nonetheless deported or expelled a smaller share of migrants who crossed the border than Donald Trump did. Deportations by ICE also fell to an average of 35,000 per year, versus 80,000 a year during Trump's presidency.

On December 19, 2024, ICE reported that deportations had surged to a 10-year high under the Biden administration with 271,000 unauthorized immigrants deported in fiscal year 2024, surpassing the Trump-era high of 267,000 deportations in 2019. The numbers were noted to be the highest since the 316,000 deportations in 2014 during the Obama administration. ICE stated that increased deportations came from efforts to streamline the deportation process and diplomatic efforts with countries to take back more deportees. The numbers did not include removals and returns of migrants at the border, which had sharply increased following Biden's June Executive Order.

=== Unlawful spouses of American citizens ===
In 2020, Biden declared to reverse the actions by the former Trump administration and planned to create a task force designed to specifically reunite and keep separated families back together. On 26 January 2021, Biden rescinded the controversial family separation policy that was implemented during the Trump administration.

On 19 August 2024, President Biden announced a new program called Keeping Families Together specifically created for legally married spouses of U.S. citizens without legal status in the country. Referring the older law reserved for military personnels since 1952, the law was expanded to civilian spouses of U.S. citizens married before 17 June 2024. These spouses are given the opportunity to be inspected and either admitted or paroled into the country to later have a path to citizenship through their spouse. The new procedures will allow any undocumented spouse of good moral character, with some discretionary restrictions, who has been in the country for validated record of at least ten years to apply for parole in place, giving them the legal status needed to subsequently apply for a legal authorization to work, permanent residency and eventual American citizenship.

The controversial program was later sued by the various Attorneys General of sixteen American states and was adjudicated as unlawful and unenforceable by the U.S. Federal Judge John Campbell Barker at the U.S. District Court for the Eastern District of Texas in Tyler on 7 November 2024.

On 13 November 2024, the USCIS formally issued a directive complying with the U.S. Federal Court Order and shall no longer adjudicate its pending cases. Accordingly, it shall cease accepting applications for the program, along with canceling any scheduled biometric appointments for current applicants.

=== Legal pathways ===
The Biden administration encouraged legal pathways for immigrants, including by opening regional processing centers in Latin America to help migrants apply for asylum, and expanded access to CBP One, a mobile application for migrants to schedule asylum appointments. 813,000 migrants entered the country legally through Mexico by making appointments on CBP One between January 2023 and August 2024.

==== Other Parole programs ====
The Biden administration relied heavily on parole, including the humanitarian parole of detained migrants, and targeted programs for certain nationalities. Under the Parole for Cubans, Haitians, Nicaraguans, and Venezuelans program started in 2022, as many as 30,000 migrants per month could legally fly to the United States from the four target countries. Similar programs provided parole to migrants from Ukraine and Afghanistan.

The Biden administration argued these programs help reduce illegal Mexico-United States border crossings. This controversial program was terminated in August 2024 due to concerns about fraudulent practices among sponsors, after approximately 520,000 migrants had used the program. The parole programs have been the subject of lawsuits by multiple Republican-led states.

=== Mexican border ===
In January 2021, Biden called Mexican President Andrés Manuel López Obrador to speak about immigration, where Biden spoke of reducing immigration from Mexico to the United States by targeting the root causes, including $4 billion to aid development in El Salvador, Guatemala, and Honduras.

The U.S. Border Patrol made more than 1.7 million arrests of migrants crossing the U.S.–Mexico border illegally in fiscal year 2021, the highest number ever recorded. In September 2024, it was reported that about 8 million "encounters" (attempts to cross successfully met and denied by border patrol) had occurred at the Mexican border since Biden took office, up from 2.4 million across Trump's first term. 1,589,155 "gotaways" (automated detections of illegal crossings into the United States unmet by border patrol agents) occurred between fiscal year 2021 and 2023, compared with 521,247 "gotaways" between fiscal years 2017 and 2020. 2.3 million migrants were released into the country at the border between 2021 and 2023, compared to 6 million who were taken into custody by the CBP. 50.9% of migrants arrested at the southern border were expelled rather than released during Biden's first two years in office, up from 47.4% during Trump's last two.

=== Immigration and Customs Enforcement ===
On February 7, 2021, Biden began the implementation of new guidelines for Immigration and Customs Enforcement agents, forbidding or restricting them from seeking out deportations on the basis of "drug based crimes (less serious offenses), simple assault, DUI, money laundering, property crimes, fraud, tax crimes, solicitation, or charges without convictions," as stated by Tae Johnson, the acting director of ICE, instead prioritizing "violent behavior, well-documented gang affiliations," and a record of child abuse, murder, rape, and major drug infractions. Deportations merely on the basis of at least 10-year old felonies or "loose" gang affiliations would also be prevented. The guidelines also required permission from the director of ICE for agents to arrest suspects outside of jails and prisons. As of February 7, 2021, the guidelines were awaiting confirmation from Secretary of Homeland Security Alejandro Mayorkas.

On February 27, 2021, the Biden administration moved to expand the government's capacity to house migrant children as it attempts to respond to an increase in border crossings of unaccompanied minors, notably by its re-opening of a temporary influx holding facility in Carrizo Springs, Texas.

=== Refugees ===
On February 4, 2021, Biden signed an executive order aimed at rescinding some of Trump's immigration policies. It also called for a review to determine whether Afghan and Iraqi applicants for the Special Immigrant Visa were unduly delayed. The order also called for a report on the effect of man-made Climate change on environmental immigration to the United States within 180 days. It reversed a 2019 executive order restricting federal funding for the resettlement of refugees unless state and local governments to consent to it. However, a federal judge already struck down the order in January 2020.

In fiscal year 2022, the Biden administration resettled 25,465 people through the U.S. Refugee Admissions Program, followed by 60,014 refugees in fiscal year 2023. For fiscal year 2024, the refugee cap was once again set at 125,000.

=== Asylum ===
In early 2021, the Biden administration issued an executive order restoring an Obama-era policy repealed by Trump that grants asylum to apprehended migrants fleeing domestic or gang violence, allowing them to stay in the United States while their case is being reviewed.

Effective May 11, 2023, the Biden administration issued new restrictions on asylum seekers at the Mexican border to discourage people arriving at the border illegally. DHS and DOJ finalized a new rule effective after the end of Title 42 to further incentivize individuals to use lawful, safe, and orderly pathways. The rule presumes those who do not use lawful pathways to enter the United States are ineligible for asylum and allows the United States to remove individuals who do not establish a reasonable fear of persecution or torture in the country of removal. Noncitizens can rebut this presumption based only on exceptionally compelling circumstances. The ACLU immediately challenged the rule as a continuation of a previous Trump administration rule that was enjoined in 2018.

On June 4, 2024, Biden passed an executive order to shut down the border if illegal crossings reached an average of 2,500 migrants a day in a given week.

The order suspended protection for asylum seekers without a "credible fear" for requiring asylum, allowing for immediate deportation of unauthorized migrants. The order went into effect immediately after it was signed due to the threshold of 2,500+ daily border encounters being met for its execution. As part of the new action, the Biden administration announced the closure of the South Texas Family Residential Center, the largest immigrant detention center in the United States. The primary reason cited for this decision was the high cost of operating the facility.

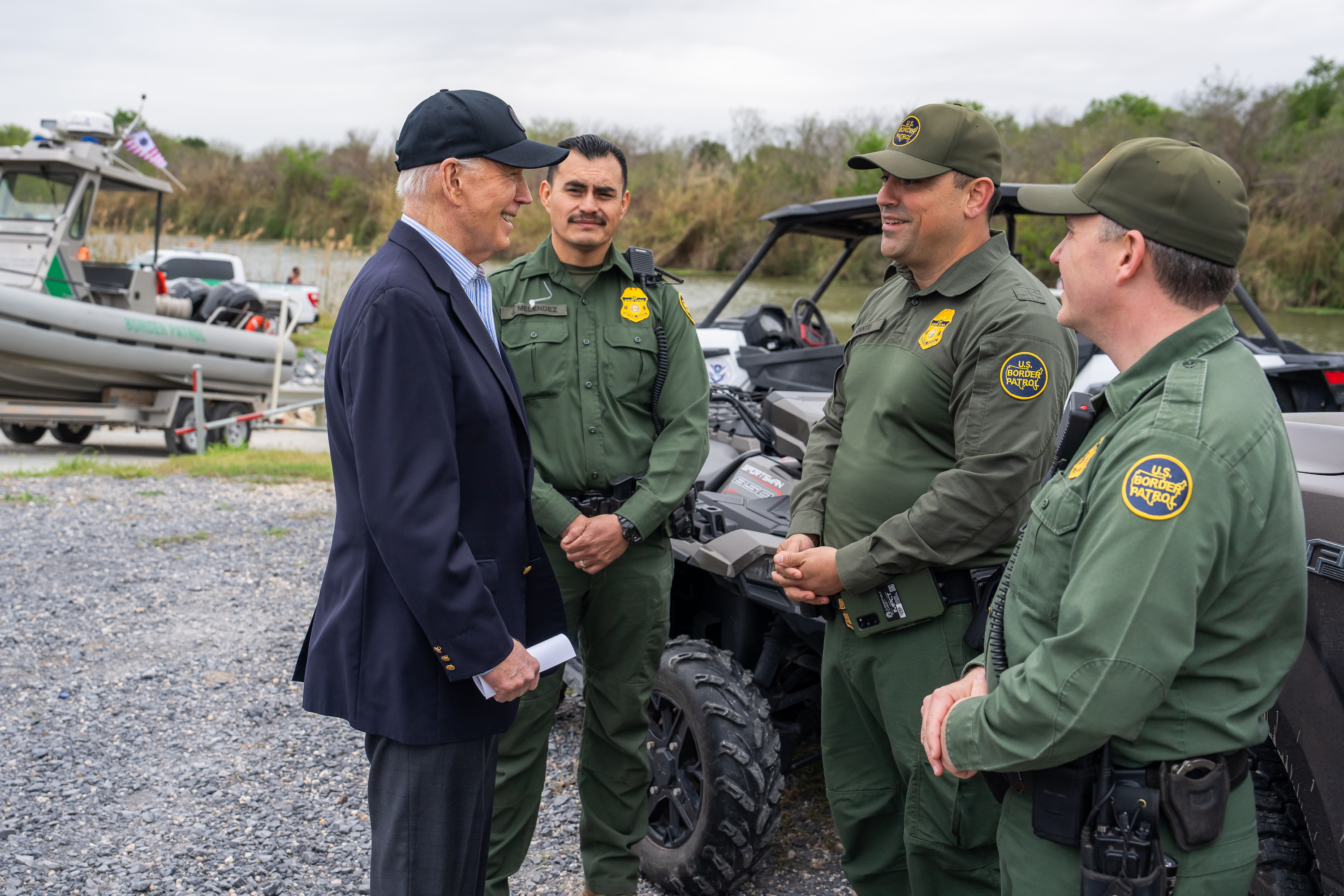
President Biden (left) with United States Border Patrol agents in Brownsville, Texas in 2024

=== Public charge rule ===
After courts struck down Trump's 2019 tightening of the public charge rule, Biden adopted a narrower version in September 2022 that prevents immigrants from becoming citizens if they will be primarily dependent on the government for subsistence. The 2019 rule had previously denied immigrants green cards if they were to use benefits like Medicaid.

=== Canadian border ===
On March 24, 2023, President Biden and Canadian Prime Minister Justin Trudeau announced tougher immigration policies for people traveling through the Canada-U.S. border after revising the Safe Third Country agreement. Trudeau confirmed that the new policy would go into effect that midnight. Under the new agreement, Canada will be allowed to send migrants who cross at unofficial ports of entry at America's northern border back to the U.S., while the U.S. will also be able to turn back asylum seekers who travel across the border from Canada. In return, Trudeau agreed to allow 15,000 more people from the Western Hemisphere to migrate to Canada legally.

=== Congressional legislation supported ===
==== U.S. Citizenship Act (2021) ====
On his first day in office in January 2021, Biden proposed the U.S. Citizenship Act of 2021 which would have made the pathway to citizenship easier for those already in the United States, provide funding to reduce asylum backlogs and strengthen the border and ports of entry through modern technology. It also would have replaced the word "alien" with "noncitizen" in United States immigration law. On January 23, 2021, Biden introduced the immigration bill to Congress, however it was not passed. As introduced, the bill would have given a path to citizenship to 11 million undocumented immigrants currently living in the United States. The bill also would have made it easier for foreign workers to stay in the U.S.

==== Bipartisan Border Security Bill (2023-2024) ====
In February 2024 and again in May 2024, Republicans in the Senate blocked a bipartisan border security bill Biden had pushed for to reduce the number of migrants who can claim asylum at the border and provide more money for Customs and Border Protection officials, asylum officers, immigration judges and scanning technology at the border. It also provided for thousands of work visas for migrant spouses of U.S. citizens awaiting immigrant visas, and 250,000 new visas over five years for people seeking to work in the U.S. or join family members. It was negotiated in a bipartisan manner and initially looked like it had the votes to pass until Donald Trump opposed it, citing that it would boost Biden's reelection chances. Five Democratic senators voted against it for not providing enough relief for migrants already in the United States.

== Reception ==
=== Republicans ===
In response to the series of executive orders signed on February 4, 2021, intended to rescind former President Donald Trump's policies regarding refugees and resettlement, Republican Senator Tom Cotton of Arkansas argued that Biden's relaxed immigration policy would "put American jobs and safety at risk during a pandemic." Cotton also argued in a Fox & Friends interview that "A lot of these migrants that are coming, we have no way to screen their backgrounds for either health or for security" in response to the Biden administration, a claim debunked by PolitiFact.

On January 17, 2024, a Republican-led non-binding resolution denouncing the Biden-Harris administration's handling of the U.S. southern border passed the House of Representatives by a vote of 225–187, with 211 Republicans and 14 Democrats supporting it.

On February 13, 2024, Secretary of Homeland Security Alejandro Mayorkas was impeached on a 214-213 party-line vote by the United States House of Representatives over his handling of the Mexico–United States border.

On July 25, 2024, the United States House of Representatives voted 220–196 to pass another Republican-led resolution condemning the Biden-Harris administration for their handling of the U.S. southern border. Six Democrats voted with all Republicans in the House to pass the resolution.

=== Democrats ===
In March 2021, the immigration policy of Joe Biden continued to draw criticism after a series of pictures emerged of a crowded detention facility housing migrant children. Democratic U.S. Representative Henry Cuellar released photos from the migrant facility in Donna, Texas, which showed children in an overcrowded border facility. Cuellar claimed the children were being held in “terrible conditions”. Cuellar said the facility consists of “pods” that can hold up to 260 people. Cuellar said one particular pod housed 400 boys.

=== Advocacy groups ===
In February 2021, President of the Lutheran Immigration and Refugee Service Krish O'Mara Vignarajah commended Biden's proposed eight-fold increase of the refugee cap, stating that it would save the lives of "hundreds of thousands fleeing violence and persecution." As many as 160 criminal justice and immigration advocacy groups signed a letter that month arguing Biden should do more than just reverse Trump's immigration policies and achieve comprehensive immigration reform and racial justice, citing immigration policies enacted during the Bush and Obama administrations such as Operation Streamline. Jacinta Gonzalez, representing Mijente, criticized Biden's initial immigration policy, arguing that "[Biden] said he would phase out private prisons but didn't end contracts with private detention centers where most immigrants are being locked up." Activists also referenced the Biden-Sanders Unity Task Forces, a group intended to bridge the divide between the moderate and progressive wings of the party, whose recommendations included the end of "mass prosecutions of individuals who cross the border without regards to the facts and circumstances of their cases...that deny individuals their right to a fair hearing and due process," as well as ending the criminalization of illegal immigration and prioritizing services to provide economic and humanitarian aid to undocumented immigrants.

In January 2023, advocates would condemn Biden's tougher approach to immigration including plans to strengthen Title 42 deportations for immigrants who crossed the Southern U.S. border.

=== ICE officials ===
In response to Biden's order on February 7, 2021, an anonymous ICE official chafed that the Biden administration had "abolished ICE without abolishing ICE [...] The pendulum swing is so extreme. It literally feels like we've gone from the ability to fully enforce our immigration laws to now being told to enforce nothing." Other ICE officials and agents argued that said changes were more dramatic than even Biden promised during his campaign. On the other hand, former acting director of ICE under the Obama administration, John Sandweg, commended the actions, criticizing the Trump administration's policies as authoritarian and distracting from violent criminals, and drawing the comparison that "No one judges the FBI by the number of arrests they make. They judge them by the quality of arrests."

=== Polling ===
A Morning Consult poll released in March 2021 found that 49% of American voters disapproved of Joe Biden's immigration policy with only 40% approving. Overall, 70% of Democrats and 11% of Republicans approve of Joe Biden's immigration policies. Another poll by The Associated Press-NORC Center for Public Affairs Research released in April 2021 found that 42% of Americans approved of Joe Biden's immigration policies with 74% of Democrats and 10% of Republicans approving. In addition, 74% of African Americans, 50% of Hispanics, and 34% of white Americans approve of Biden's immigration policy.

In a February 2023 Gallup poll, 33% of Americans approved of Joe Biden's immigration policies, with 62% of Democrats, 31% of Independents, and 6% of Republicans approving. A February 2024 Monmouth poll found that 26% of Americans approved of Biden's handle on immigration while 71% disapproved. In a Marquette poll taken that same month, 54% of Americans said that Biden's predecessor, Donald Trump, would do a better job handling immigration compared to 26% who preferred Biden.

== Causes and impact ==
As of the spring of 2024, immigration during the Biden administration has been credited as a major driver of economic growth, in part by helping to address the large labor shortage during the COVID-19 recovery as many workers retired or took different jobs. The large number of job openings played an important role in motivating migration as the pandemic was receding. The rise in immigration has also been credited with helping to moderate inflation, though the impact is debated. The Economist cites Giovanni Peri who says that immigrants tend to raise wages in communities that they move to as they allow for more specialization by taking lower-paying jobs, competing mostly with the last generation of immigrants for pay.

The surge in immigration is also not without costs on various systems that are adjusting to the influx, including housing shortages.

== See also ==
- United States v. Hansen
- United States v. Texas (2023)
- Biden v. Texas

== External link ==
- Media related to Immigration policy of the Joe Biden administration at Wikimedia Commons
