= Mexico–United States border crisis =

Ongoing migrant crisis

- Part of War on drugs and Mexican drugs war
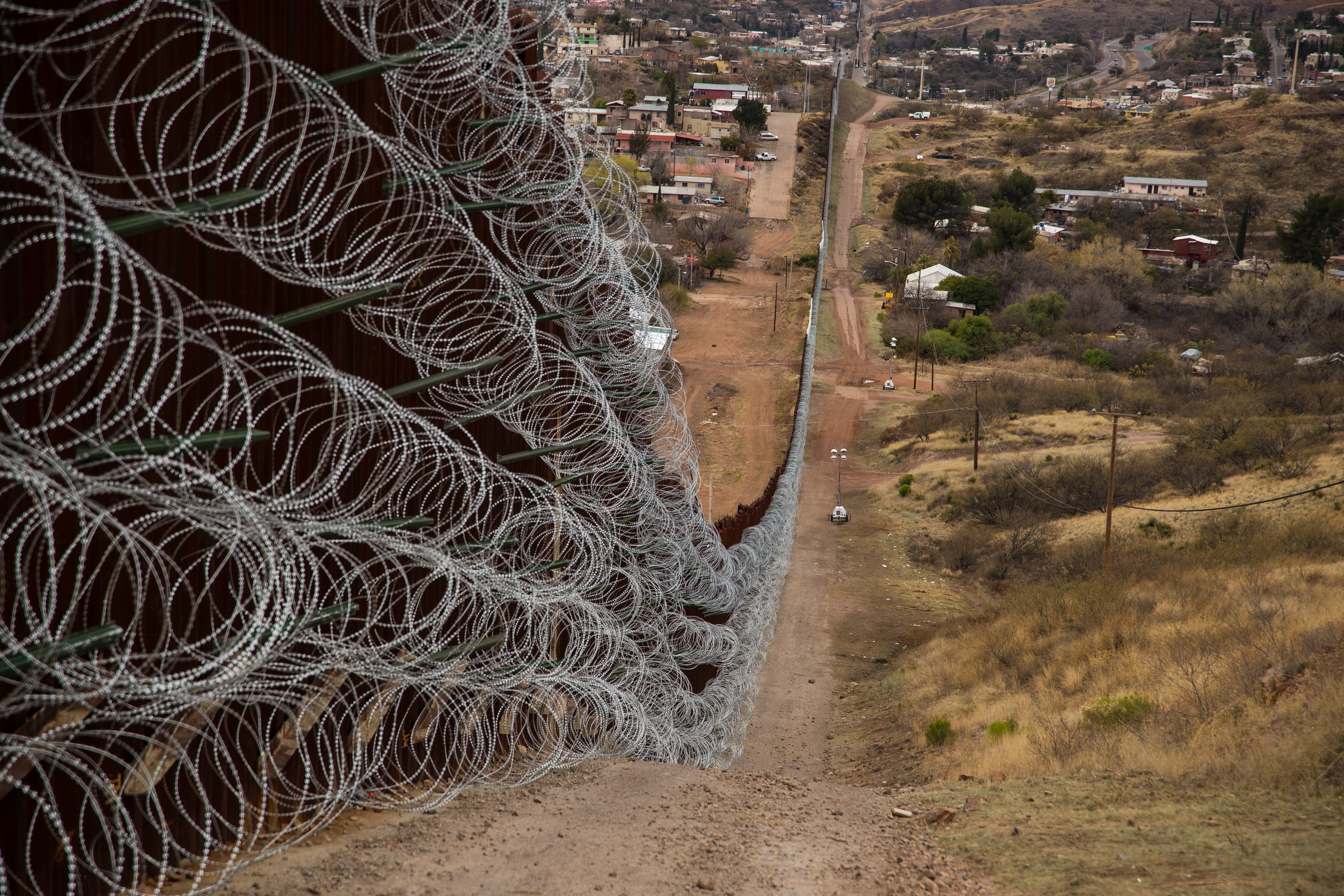
- Border between Nogales, Arizona, and Nogales, Sonora
- Motive: Immigration and asylum seeking in the US
- Deaths: 7,216 (1998–2017); At least 853 in 2022
- Arrests: 2.3 million in 2022

The illegal migration of people into the United States across the Mexico-United States border has caused an ongoing migrant crisis. U.S. presidents Barack Obama and Donald Trump both referred to surges in migrants at the border as a "crisis" during their tenure. Following a decline in migrants crossing the border during the first Trump administration, illegal border crossings surged during the Biden administration, with over 7.2 million migrants encountered between January 2021 and January 2024, not counting gotaways. Experts have attributed the increase in attempted crossings to pent-up demand, changes in global migration patterns, a change of perceptions by migrants about the ease of crossing, and incentives for migrants to try to cross again after Title 42 expulsions. The number of migrants sent back increased as a result, though the percentage sent back decreased. Border apprehensions fell back to 2020 levels in mid-2024.

The migrants, who are mostly of Guatemalan, Salvadoran, Honduran, and Venezuelan citizenship, are reported to be escaping economic hardship, gang violence and environmental disaster in their home countries and seeking asylum in the United States. Unlike the demographic of migrants in the preceding years, an increasing proportion of current migrants arriving at the Mexico–US border are children, including unaccompanied children and from countries outside Latin America.

== Background ==
The agents of the US Border Patrol (USBP), a federal law enforcement agency, are tasked with deterring, detecting, and apprehending any person crossing into the US illegally at any point not designated as a port of entry by the US attorney general. Additionally, agents interdict and seize contraband smuggled into the US through non-ports of entry. USBP agents are both immigration and customs officials. Border security and immigration policy has been a wedge issue in politics for a long time. In 1996, the Illegal Immigration Reform and Immigrant Responsibility Act was passed, which expedited the deportation of immigrants who were detained crossing the border. After the terrorist attacks of September 11, 2001, more aggressive immigration laws were implemented, which gave more power to the USBP.

Violence is a leading cause of immigration north to the United States. According to the GAO, the ATF found that 70% of firearms recovered and submitted for tracing in Mexico from 2014 through 2018 were "U.S. sourced". An estimated 200,000 to 500,000 weapons smuggled across the U.S.-Mexico border every year. In El Salvador 49% of the illegal weapons come from the United States. In Honduras 45% of guns recovered at crime scenes traced to the United States. In 2021, the Mexican government sued U.S. gun makers seeking to hold them liable for harms inflicted by Mexican drug cartels in the ongoing drug war.

American interference in Latin America (including through regime change) has also contributed to instability that has caused emigration.

== Deaths along the border ==
The International Organization for Migration (IOM) documented 686 deaths and disappearances of migrants crossing the U.S.-Mexico border in 2022, making it the deadliest land route for migrants worldwide. This is a stark surge compared to when the USBP reported 294 migrant deaths in the fiscal year 2017 (ending September 30, 2017), which was lower than in 2016 (321), and any year during the period 2003–2014. Some of the leading causes are exposure (including heat stroke, dehydration, and hyperthermia). Many recent deaths and disappearances have been linked to the record-breaking heat and, therefore, hazardous crossing conditions of the Sonoran and Chihuahuan Deserts. However, rates of migrant deaths and disappearances have only increased in recent years.

According to the estimates by the group Border Angels, about 10,000 people have died in their attempt to cross the border since 1994. However, the statistics mentioned above reflect only known deaths and do not include estimates for those who have never been found. Some migrant deaths may go unreported even when they are brought to the attention of officials. In a recent interaction between WOLA and Border Patrol officials, the agency claims to have found 640 deceased migrants between October 2022 and August 2023. Yet, this still reflects an undercount. There have been minimal efforts from local law enforcement agencies to keep accurate and robust tracking of migrant deaths. Additionally, there is inadequate infrastructure to identify and return remains to families.

== Timeline ==
=== Obama administration (2009–2017) ===
History of immigration enforcement actions, raw numbers as reported by the U.S. Department of Homeland Security

As a percent of the US population, recent figures for enforcement actions are similar to those in several past decades.

US Southwest Border Encounters since 2001

In 2014, the US declared a crisis at the border due to an influx of unaccompanied minors and women making their way through checkpoints. The US southern border had long struggled with implementing policies that aim to prevent immigration-related tragedies. With a decline in unlawful immigration from Mexico, the crisis predominantly concerned increased immigration from the Northern Triangle of Central America (NTCA), encompassing Honduras, Guatemala, and El Salvador. Academics claimed the immigration crisis was a result of US interventions in Central America during the Cold War, with high amounts of political instability, violent crime, and poverty stemming from the US's support of authoritarian regimes.

==== Proposed legislative remedies ====
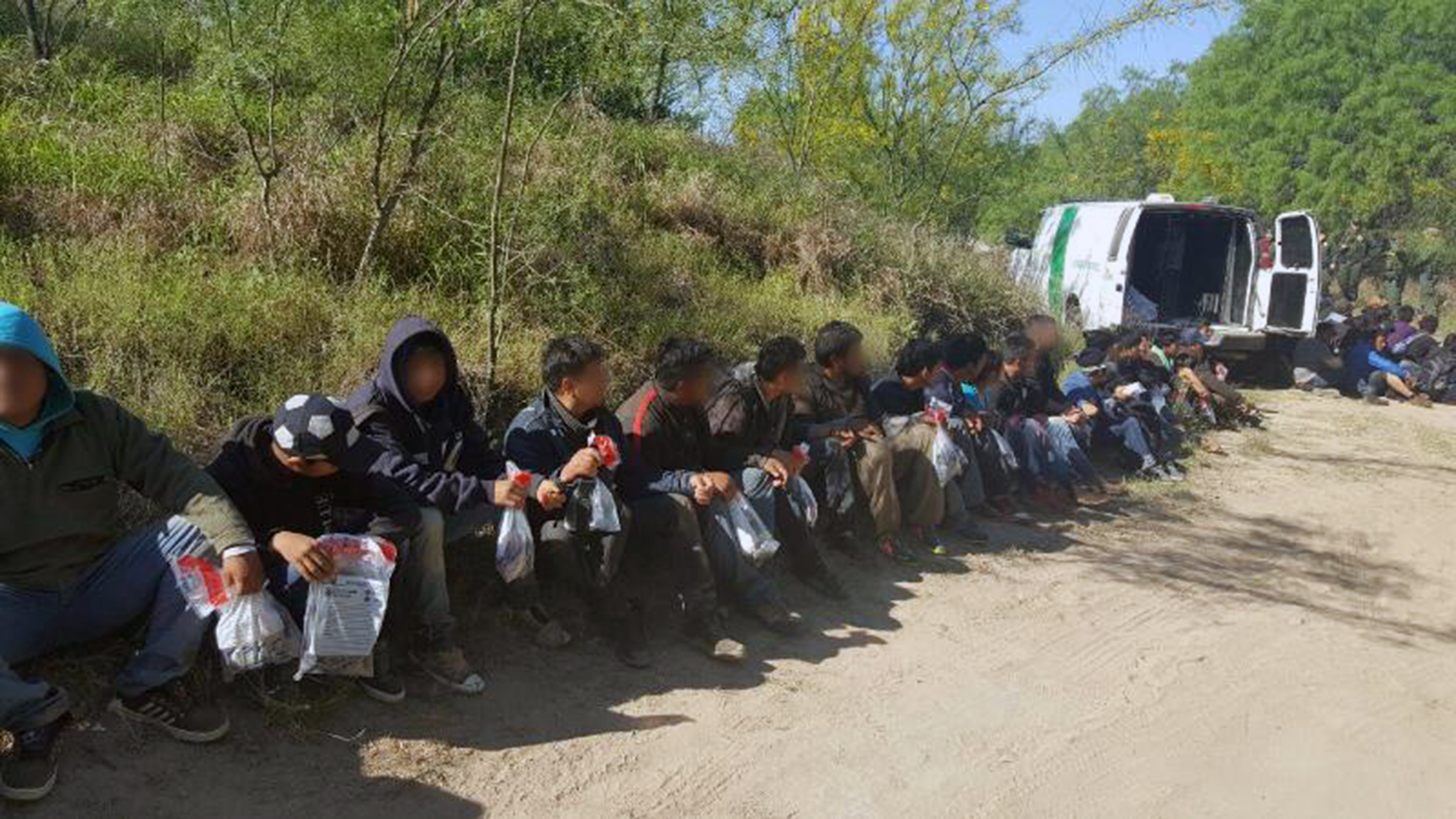
Illegal immigrants apprehended by United States Border Patrol near Rio Grande City, 2016

In June 2013, the Senate approved the most comprehensive immigration overhaul bill since 1986. Negotiated by a bipartisan group of eight senators, fourteen Republicans joined all Democrats in voting for the measure; President Obama promised to sign it. Most conservative Republicans opposed the bill and said it would be dead on arrival in the House. The bill provided for increased border security, including 20,000 new border patrol officers, completion of 700 miles of border fencing, and new border surveillance equipment. The bill also provided a "path to citizenship" for some eleven million undocumented immigrants already living in the country. Gallup polling found the overhaul was broadly supported by both Democrats and Republicans. Speaker John Boehner refused to consider the bill in the House, promising "to do our own bill." No immigration reform bill emerged.

Legacy

The immigration legacy of the Obama Administration is marked by complexity. While it was known for its stringent enforcement of immigration laws, resulting in the deportation of a significant number of migrants, the establishment of Deferred Action for Childhood Arrivals (DACA) stands out. This initiative has protected from deportation over 750,000 individuals who were brought to the U.S. as children. Though no permanent solution was put in place, DACA was a success, allowing individuals within the program to pursue higher education.

=== First Trump administration (2017–2021) ===
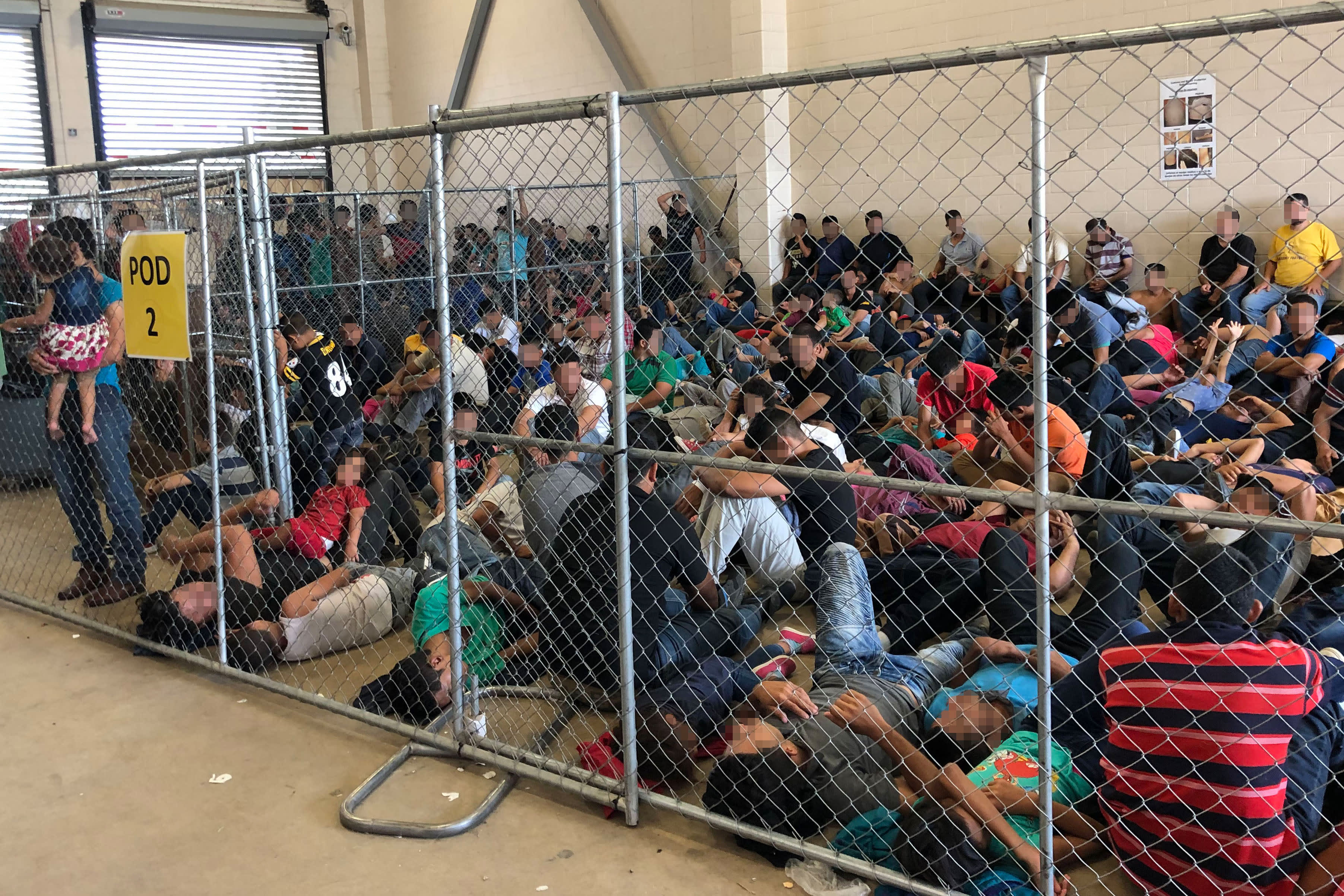
Detained illegal immigrants at the overcrowded United States Border Patrol's McAllen, Texas station, 2019

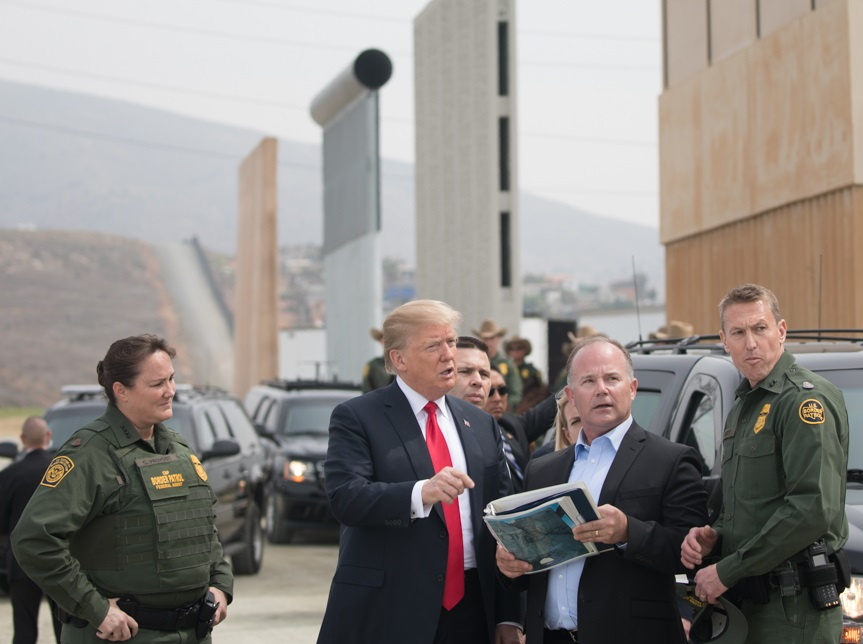
President Donald Trump examines border wall prototypes in Otay Mesa, San Diego.

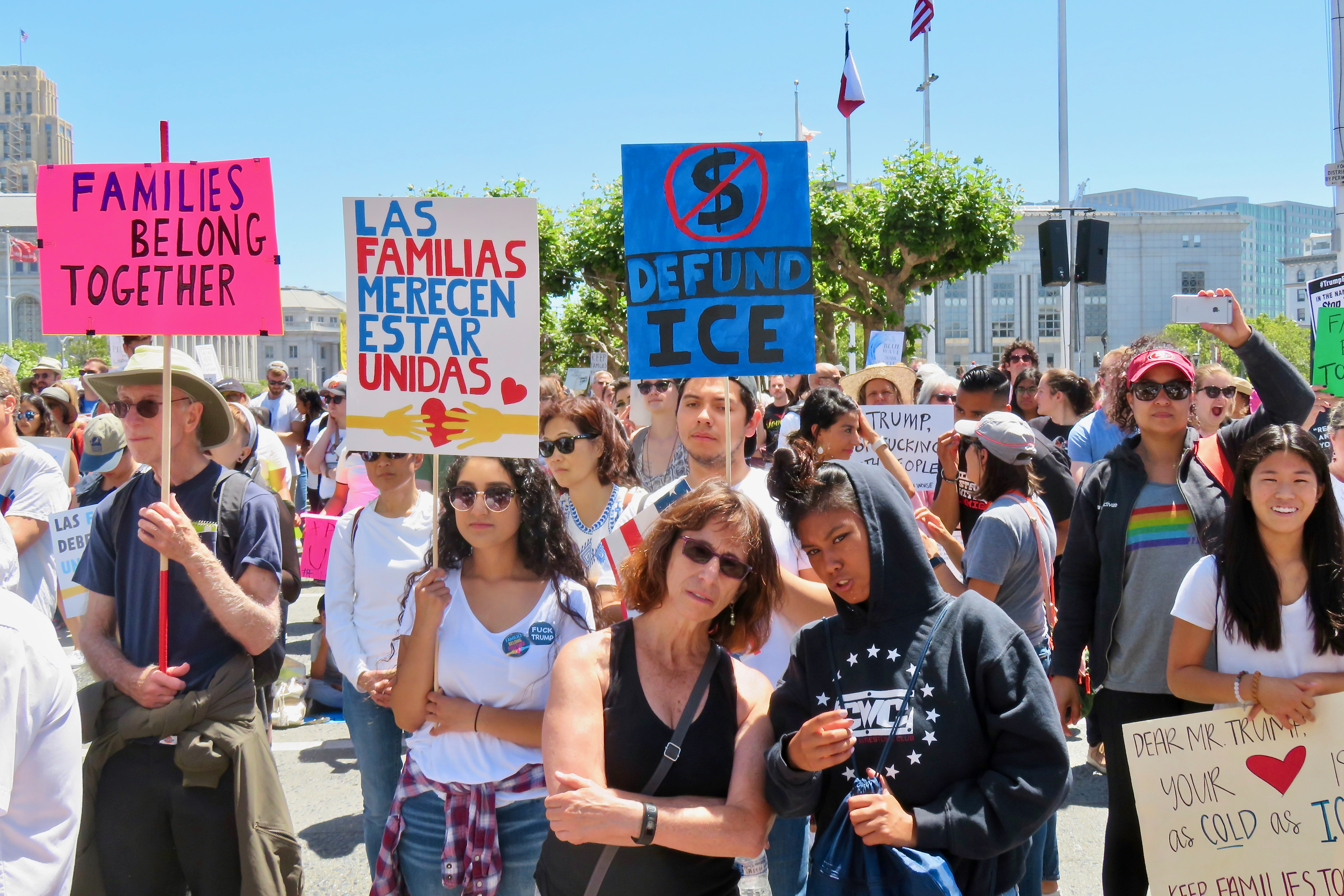
In June 2018, thousands protested the family separation policy in San Francisco for "Families Belong Together".

In January 2019, Trump introduced the Migrant Protection Protocols (also known as "Remain in Mexico"), which forced asylum seekers to wait in Mexico for their US immigration hearings. About 70,000 people were returned to Mexico as a result. The Trump administration asked migrants to take a number at the border and to wait until they are called for a chance to have their asylum cases heard. As a result, in September 2019, the US immigration court faced over one million waiting for their cases to be heard, matching the highest backlog seen in the US.

In September 2019, the US Supreme Court allowed a new ruling to take effect that could curtail most asylum applications at the border. The ruling would demand that most asylum seekers who pass through another country first will be ineligible for asylum at the US's southern border. Mark A. Morgan, acting commissioner of the US Customs and Border Protection (CBP), stated the ruling was set to take effect the week of October 8, 2019.

In several places, dangers including kidnapping, murder, and sexual assault threatened thousands of Central American migrants who had been clustered in Mexican border cities like Matamoros, Tamaulipas for months, blocked from seeking asylum in the US because of new restriction policies. The US government and United Nations provided free transportation to return refugees to their homes in Central America, but many others who were stuck in Matamoros said that desperation had led them to consider treacherous and potentially life-threatening methods of illegal entry—crossing the river, climbing into tractor-trailers driven by human smugglers, or both. In 2019, as the USBP reported, the number of migrants caught hiding in tractor-trailers along the border had risen by 40 percent that year.

In March 2020, Trump instituted Title 42, which allowed U.S. authorities to swiftly expel migrants, including asylum seekers, at the border. Between its implementation and January 2021, nearly 400,000 people were expelled through Title 42. Encounters had fallen by about half in fiscal 2020, when the border was closed during the COVID pandemic, following a surge in encounters in fiscal 2019.

On January 16, 2021, Guatemala and Mexico deployed the military to their borders, in an attempt to stop a migrant caravan from transiting through their countries on the way to the US.

=== Biden administration (2021–2025) ===
On his first day in office, Biden halted the construction of the Mexico–United States border wall, ending the national emergency declared by the Trump administration on February 1, 2019. He also suspended Trump's "Remain in Mexico" policy, and while a court initially blocked its cancellation, the Supreme Court of the United States upheld it on June 30, 2022.

Early during Biden's tenure, a surge in migrants at the US border stirred controversy. According to a 2021 Politico report, Republicans expected prior to Joe Biden taking office that there would be a border surge at the start of 2021 (due to seasonal patterns and regional crises) and planned to make it a central issue in the lead-up to the 2022 midterm elections. The USBP reported 5,858 encounters with unaccompanied children in January 2021 and 9,457 in February 2021. This was the largest percentage increase month-to-month since CBP began tracking the data point in 2010.

On February 21, 2021, a group of migrants was found massacred in northern Mexico. A few months later, U.S. Customs and Border Protection reported that various colored bracelets with writing on them were being used as a method to track a migrant's payment status to their coyote and drug cartels that control various parts of Mexico. The bracelets reportedly are used for tracking status of protection from cartel actions such as death, kidnapping, and the right to be in cartel controlled territory or to cross the border into the US.

On March 18, 2021, amid a rise in migrants entering the US from Mexico, Biden told migrants, "Don't come over." He said that the US was arranging a plan for migrants to apply for asylum in place, without leaving their original locations, and that migrant adults would be continue to be sent back under Title 42. Biden earlier announced that his administration would not deport unaccompanied migrant children; the rise in arrivals of such children exceeded the capacity of facilities meant to shelter them (before they were sent to sponsors), leading the Biden administration in March to direct the Federal Emergency Management Agency to help manage these children, but facilities are being overwhelmed because of the numbers of adults and children coming into the country.

On March 24, 2021, Biden asked Vice President Kamala Harris to work with Mexico and Northern Triangle nations to curb the current flow of migrants to the border and develop a long-term solution. In June 2021, Harris visited Guatemala and Mexico in an attempt to address the root causes of migration from Central America to the United States. During her visit, in a joint press conference with Guatemalan President Alejandro Giammattei, Harris issued an appeal to potential migrants, stating "I want to be clear to folks in the region who are thinking about making that dangerous trek to the United States-Mexico border: Do not come. Do not come."

The USBP detained more than 1.7 million migrants crossing the Mexico–US border illegally in the 2021 fiscal year, the largest annual total on record. According to Customs and Border Protection (CBP) data, in fiscal year 2022, undocumented immigrant crossings reached 2.76 million. One month before the end of fiscal year 2023, crossings for that year reached 2.8 million. CBP reported a monthly record of approximately 250,000 migrant encounters in December 2023. 7.2 million migrants were encountered between January 2021 and January 2024, more than the individual populations of 36 states.

2.3 million migrants were released into the country at the border between 2021 and 2023, compared to 6 million who were taken into custody by the CBP. Over 1.5 million migrants were additionally recorded as "gotaways", detected illegally crossing the border while evading the CBP, up from about 521 thousand between 2017 and 2020. The DHS has said the true number of illegal entries is not known because an unknown number evade detection. In fiscal year 2023, CBP figures showed that 169 people on the United States' terrorist watch list were arrested at the border, compared to 98 in 2022 and 15 in 2021. According to a November 30, 2021 Gallup poll, only 31 percent of Americans approved of the president's handling of immigration.

Progressives have pressed the Biden administration to impede the expulsions and provide asylum to migrants who have legitimate claims of persecution in their homelands. It was stated in April that the order would be lifted on May 8, 2022, with new plans in place to deal with the influx.

Title 42 expulsions: 42 U.S. Code § 265 governs suspension of entries to prevent spread of communicable diseases. Shown: expulsions from the southwest U.S. border at the time of the COVID-19 pandemic.

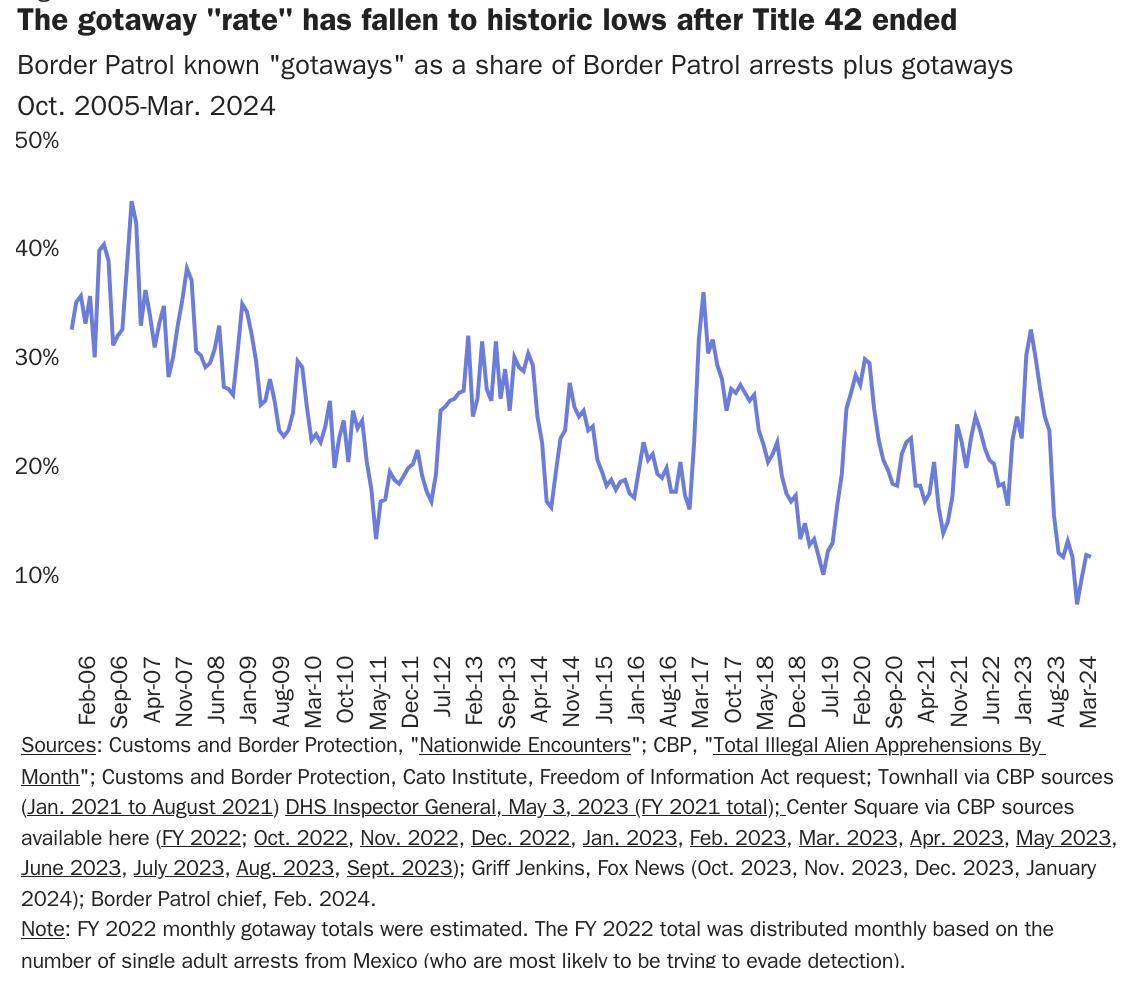
'Gotaway' rate fell to historic lows after Title 42 ended in May 2023.

Biden kept Title 42 in place until its expiration on May 11, 2023, with nearly three million expulsions between March 2020 and its expiration. Title 42 resulted in many repeat attempts from people expelled, as well as an increase in 'gotaways' which dropped to a record low rate after Title 42 expired. According to the libertarian Cato Institute, the drop in gotaways allowed border patrol to apprehend more criminals and make the border more secure. Following the end of Title 42, illegal crossings temporarily decreased, partly due to the Biden administration creating more legal pathways in its place. Between June and September 2023, the number of illegal crossings increased every month and returned to pre-Title 42 levels.

Over the course of the year after Title 42 ended, the Biden administration deported more people in a fiscal year than any year since 2010. However, as of February 2024, Biden deported or expelled a smaller share of migrants who crossed the border than Donald Trump did. Deportations by Immigration and Customs Enforcement (ICE) also fell to an average of 35,000 per year, versus 80,000 a year during Trump's presidency.

The Biden administration encouraged legal pathways for immigrants, including by opening regional processing centers in Latin America to help migrants apply for asylum, and expanded access to CBP One, an app for migrants to schedule asylum appointments. 813,000 migrants entered the country legally through CBP One between January 2023 and August 2024. It has also relied heavily on parole, including the humanitarian parole of detained migrants, and targeted programs for certain nationalities. Nearly 530,000 migrants between January 2023 and August 2024 legally flew to the United States under parole programs for four Latin American countries, with the Biden administration arguing it helped reduce illegal Mexico-United States border crossings. The parole programs have been the subject of lawsuits by multiple Republican-led states.

According to immigration lawyer and Case Western Reserve University professor Alex Cuic, part of the surge in illegal immigration is because migrants "think they can just come". Human smugglers used the change in presidency to create a sense of urgency for migrants to cross the border. The Dallas Morning News reported in September 2023 that a July survey conducted in four Central American countries found that many in those countries had heard misinformation that the United States had an "open border" policy. The executive director of America's Voice, an advocacy group that promotes immigration reform, said human smugglers were amplifying the false "open border" narrative to lure Central Americans to the United States border, under the impression they would be granted asylum upon arrival. BSP Research, which conducted the survey, asserted that disinformation originated with politicians and conservative media. Media Matters used a video database to track the use of the term "open borders," finding that Fox News and Newsmax each used the term over 3,000 times from November 2020 through August 2023.

On January 17, 2024, a non-binding resolution denouncing the Biden-Harris administration's handling of the U.S. southern border passed the House of Representatives by a vote of 225–187, with all Republicans and 14 Democrats supporting it.

Many Republicans and conservative commentators alleged Homeland Security Secretary Alejandro Mayorkas committed "willful and systemic refusal to comply with the law" as justification for impeachment. Constitutional scholars, Democrats, and some conservatives asserted Republicans were improperly using impeachment to address immigration policy disputes rather than for high crimes and misdemeanors, of which there was no evidence. On February 13, 2024, Mayorkas was impeached on a 214–213 party-line vote by the United States House of Representatives.

On June 4, 2024, Biden signed Executive Order 14123, temporarily shutting down asylum requests and rendering any migrants who crossed the border illegally or without explicit authorization ineligible for asylum, and allowing the removal of migrants who do not have a credible reason for requesting asylum. The order shut down the border if illegal crossings reached an average of 2,500 migrants a day in a given week. The order went into effect immediately after being signed due to the threshold of average daily encounters reaching 2,500 people being exceeded. As part of the new action, the Biden administration announced the closure of the South Texas Family Residential Center, the largest immigrant detention center in the United States. The primary reason cited for this decision was the high cost of operating the facility.

By the end of June 2024, illegal crossings reached a three-year low following four consecutive monthly drops, which senior U.S. officials attributed to increased enforcement between the United States and Mexico and the weather, as well as the effects of Biden's executive order. Daily apprehensions fell to 2,000 from May's 3,800. By July 2024, border arrests dropped 33% to a 46-month low after it had previously dropped by 55% in June, the lowest level since September 2020.

On July 25, 2024, the United States House of Representatives voted 220–196 to pass another resolution condemning the Biden-Harris administration for its handling of the U.S. southern border. Six Democrats voted with all Republicans in the House to pass the resolution.

On September 28, 2024, ICE released figures showing that 435,719 convicted criminals were illegally living in the United States outside of ICE detention, including 62,231 who had been convicted of assault, 15,811 of sexual assault, and 56,533 of drug possession. 226,847 additional undocumented residents were facing criminal charges. In a letter to Republican congressman Tony Gonzales, ICE blamed the high figures on local prosecutors refusing to comply with its detainer requests, which ask police to hold migrants in custody to give ICE time to receive them. In a statement to NBC News, the Department of Homeland Security noted that "the data in this letter is being misinterpreted. The data goes back decades; it includes people who entered the country over the past 40 years or more, the vast majority of whose custody determination was made long before this administration. It also includes many who are under the jurisdiction or currently incarcerated by federal, state, or local law enforcement partners."

On December 19, 2024, ICE reported that deportations had surged to a 10-year high under the Biden administration, with 271,000 unauthorized immigrants deported in fiscal year 2024, surpassing the Trump-era high of 267,000 deportations in 2019. The numbers were noted to be the highest since the 316,000 deportations in 2014 during the Obama administration. ICE stated that increased deportations came from efforts to streamline the deportation process and diplomatic efforts with countries to take back more deportees. The numbers did not include removals and returns of migrants at the border, which had sharply increased following Biden's executive order in June.

==== Proposed legislation ====
===== Republican proposals =====
On May 3, 2023, the Republican-led House passed H.R. 2, or the "Secure the Border Act", which would drastically restrict the asylum process, require United States employers to verify that employees were not undocumented under penalty of prison, build a border wall, defund nonprofits that provide services to undocumented immigrants, and allow the DHS to close the border entirely if it determines doing so is necessary. The bill largely passed on a party-line basis, with no Democratic support, and all but two Republicans voting for it. A similar bill to H.R. 2 called H.R. 3602, or the "End The Border Catastrophe Act", was turned down on a 215–199 vote by the House on April 8, 2024, with five Democrats voting in support, joining all Republicans. The H.R. 3602 "End The Border Catastrophe Act" was brought to the floor under a fast-track procedure known as suspension of the rules, which requires a two-thirds majority for passage. Since the vote result was only a simple majority, it did not pass.

On June 18, 2023, Senate Republicans unveiled a bill that would resume border wall construction, increase pay for Border Patrol agents, reform the nation's asylum laws, crack down on humanitarian parole of illegal migrants, and deny asylum to migrants who come to the United States through safe third countries. They demanded that the reforms be attached to any foreign aid package funding Ukraine. Democratic Senate Majority Leader Chuck Schumer called the proposal partisan and "a total non-starter" and compared it to the H.R. 2 bill. The White House pointed out that it would do nothing to create a path for citizenship for DREAMers. Dick Durbin said the bill was a good starting point but critiqued it for deporting refugees from Ukraine and Afghanistan.

===== 2024 bipartisan border bill =====
Following months of negotiations, on February 4, 2024, a bipartisan group of senators released a 370-page bill intended to sharply reduce incentives for migrants to attempt border crossings. The bill included a "border emergency" provision that would automatically require the border to be closed if border encounters reached an average of 5,000 per day over several days. Trump, Speaker Mike Johnson, and other Republicans falsely claimed the bill allowed 5,000 illegal border crossings per day. In reality, the bill would have ended the practice of "catch and release" that allows migrants entry into the country while they await immigration hearings; instead, migrants would have been detained pending hearings. The plan included a tighter asylum application and approval process with speedy removal of migrants who do not qualify, the hiring of thousands more border patrol and asylum officers and an increase in detention capacity. The bill also provided for thousands of work visas for migrant spouses of U.S. citizens awaiting immigrant visas, and 250,000 new visas over five years for people seeking to work in the U.S. or join family members. It aimed to provide a pathway to citizenship for "Documented Dreamers", children who accompanied their parents on a work visa and who could lose their place in line for a green card at age 21.

President Biden supported the bill, while Speaker Johnson said days before its release that it would be "dead on arrival" in the Republican-controlled House. Shortly after the proposal was announced, House majority leader Steve Scalise declared it would not be brought before the House for a vote. One negotiator, independent Arizona Senator Kyrsten Sinema, asserted the border would have been closed every day so far in early January 2024 if the bill had been law; Biden promised in January that he would immediately close the border if the bill was enacted. Lead Republican negotiator James Lankford of Oklahoma, among the most conservative Republican Senators, attempted to defend the bill throughout the weeks leading to the vote. Trump, the leading Republican candidate for president in 2024, publicly and privately pressured Republicans during the Senate negotiations to oppose the proposal. The National Border Patrol Council, a labor union representing some 18,000 border patrol officers, quickly endorsed the Senate bill. The union had endorsed Trump in 2020 and had been critical of Biden's policies.

Senate Republicans swiftly turned against the bill upon its release, after Trump openly said he did not want Joe Biden to score a political win with the legislation. On February 7, 2024, Senate Republicans blocked the proposal in a floor vote. Lankford said on the floor before the vote that a "popular commentator" had told him a month earlier, "'If you try to move a bill that solves the border crisis during this presidential year, I will do whatever I can to destroy you, because I do not want you to solve this during the presidential election.'" Two days before the vote, Trump told a radio host, "This is a very bad bill for his career." Trump said at a rally days later, "We crushed crooked Joe Biden's disastrous open borders bill," while Biden said, "Every day between now and November, the American people are going to know that the only reason the border is not secure is Donald Trump and his MAGA Republican friends."

=== Second Trump administration (2025–present) ===
US southwest border encounters decreased with Trump's second term.

The number of people arrested by ICE increased in the second term of Donald Trump, expanding to include greater numbers who had no criminal record.

On January 20, 2025, the National Emergency Concerning the Southern Border of the United States was reinstated by an executive order on the first day of the second presidency of Donald Trump. He had also signed executive orders reviving several of his first policies from the first presidency, such as reconstructing the border wall, reinstating the "Remain in Mexico" policy, and more. Additionally, he had set new policies to address the fentanyl crisis, and predominantly designating cartels as Foreign Terrorist Organizations.

In response to pressure from the United States, Mexico increased its border enforcement in 2025. Combined with tighter U.S. border restrictions, migrant encounters at the U.S.–Mexico border fell to 237,538 in fiscal year 2025, the lowest level since 1970. Between February and July 2025, total encounters dropped by 93.3% compared with the same period in 2024.

Monthly figures for apprehensions on the US-Mexico border showed a precipitous year-on-year decrease in excess of 90% to 8,300, 7,200, and 8,400 for February, March, and April 2025, respectively, compared with the corresponding months in 2024. Historically, no full year has averaged below 9,000 apprehensions per month since the late 1960s. The drop in apprehensions has been attributed to the increased militarization of the US-Mexico border and domestic deportation efforts.

== See also ==
- Mexico–United States relations
- Operation Lone Star – 2021 to present Texas border operation
- Repatriation – Return of a thing or person to their country
- Remigration – Forced or promoted return of non-European immigrants
- Replacement migration – Theory of human migration
