= AATF =

AATF may refer to:

- Air Assault Task Force, a computer wargame
- Airport and Airway Trust Fund, a fund for the federal commitment to the US's aviation system
- American Association of Teachers of French, a professional organisation for teachers of French in the US
- Apoptosis antagonizing transcription factor, a human gene
