= Travis Couture-Lovelady =

American politician

Member of the Kansas House of Representatives from the 110th district
- In office January 14, 2013 – November 29, 2015
- Preceded by: Dan Collins
- Succeeded by: Ken Rahjes

Personal details
- Born: September 25, 1983 (age 42) Hays, Kansas, U.S.
- Party: Republican
- Education: Fort Hays State University

Travis Couture-Lovelady (September 25, 1983) (from Zurich, Kansas) was a two-term member of the Kansas House of Representatives, representing House District 110. He was given evaluations of 87%, 89% and 91% by the American Conservative Union. Couture-Lovelady gave up his House seat before the 2016 legislative session to become a full-time state liaison and lobbyist for the National Rifle Association of America.
