= David Benson (politician) =

American politician

Member of the Kansas House of Representatives from the 48th district
- In office January 14, 2019 – May 15, 2020
- Preceded by: Abraham Rafie
- Succeeded by: Jennifer Day

Personal details
- Party: Democratic

David Benson is an American politician and educator who served in the Kansas House of Representatives, as the representative of 48th district in Johnson County, Kansas, from January 2019 until his resignation in May 2020.

== Career ==
A resident of Overland Park, Kansas, he was an educator before serving in the Kansas Legislature. A native of Chanute, Kansas and a Democrat, he was elected in 2018, unseating Republican incumbent Abraham Rafie. Benson was superintendent of the Blue Valley Public Schools in Johnson County from 1993 to 2004.

Benson has been an educator in Joplin, Missouri, Salina, Kansas, Moundridge, Kansas, Junction City, Kansas and Kingman, Kansas during his career. Prior to his service as schools superintendent for Blue Valley, he was superintendent of schools in Fort Madison, Iowa and Moundridge, Kansas. Benson was also superintendent of schools in Cedar Rapids, Iowa and interim superintendent of schools in Lee's Summit, Missouri.

2019-2020 Kansas House of Representatives Committee Assignments

- Financial Institutions and Pensions
- Education
- K-12 Education Budget

Kansas House of Representatives
Preceded by Abraham Rafie	Kansas House of Representatives Representative from the 48th District; January 2019 - May 2020	Succeeded by Jennifer Day
