= U.S. Citizenship Act of 2021 =

2021 United States legislative bill

- Long title: To provide an earned path to citizenship, to address the root causes of migration and responsibly manage the southern border, and to reform the immigrant visa system, and for other purposes.
- Announced in: the 117th United States Congress
- Number of co-sponsors: 153

Legislative history
- Introduced in the House of Representatives as H.R. 1177 by Linda Sanchez (D–CA) on February 18, 2021; Committee consideration by House Judiciary

The U.S. Citizenship Act of 2021 was a legislative bill that was proposed by President Joe Biden on his first day in office. It was formally introduced in the House by Representative Linda Sánchez. It died with the ending of the 117th Congress.

The bill would have made sweeping changes across the board to the United States immigration, visa, and border control system, including reversal and Congressional prohibition of many of the immigration-related executive actions of former president Donald Trump; providing a path to legal residence and eventual citizenship for as many as 11 million undocumented immigrants, as well as current DACA and Temporary Protected Status beneficiaries, essential workers on a non-immigrant status, and agricultural laborers; recreating the V visa program to allow families to await immigrant visa approval together in the US; ending country-specific visa annual maximums; granting immediate relative status to spouses and children of green card holders; and other changes.

== Background ==
The bill was introduced in the House and Senate on February 18, 2021, by Representative Linda Sanchez and Senator Bob Menendez.

Several Republican lawmakers expressed their opposition to the bill, with Republican Senator Marco Rubio referring to it as a '"non-starter" and "blanket amnesty". Menendez led lobbying efforts for the bill in the Senate, which he called a "Herculean" task due to Republican opposition.

In addition to sending the bill to Congress, on his first day in office, Joe Biden signed three orders related to immigration. The first, in a Presidential Memorandum to the Attorney General of the United States and the Secretary of Homeland Security, aims to reinstate the DACA program. The second, in the form of a Presidential Proclamation, overturned the travel ban imposed by Donald Trump through Executive Order 13780. The third was an Executive Order reversing Executive Order 13768, which had declared "sanctuary" cities that refused to comply with immigration enforcement measures ineligible to receive Federal grants. Another Presidential Proclamation halted the construction of the Mexico-United States barrier by ending the emergency declaration that allowed Trump to divert U.S. Department of Defense funds for its construction.

Under Senate rules, the bill needed 60 votes for cloture to overcome a filibuster. Facing Republican opposition, the White House indicated the possibility of breaking the reform bill into pieces so that portions more likely to be approved (like the DACA, and employment visa provisions), could pass sooner.

== Support ==
- Zoe Lofgren (CA-19)
- Lucille Roybal-Allard (CA-40)
- Nydia Velázquez (NY-07)
- Yvette Clarke (NY-09)
- Karen Bass (CA-37)
- Judy Chu (CA-27)
- Raul Ruiz (CA-36)
- Grace Napolitano (CA-32)
- Adriano Espaillat (NY-13)
- Salud Carbajal (CA-24)
- Juan Vargas (CA-51)
- Jimmy Gomez (CA-34)
- Ruben Gallego (AZ-07)
- Lou Correa (CA-46)
- Pete Aguilar (CA-31)
- Veronica Escobar (TX-16)
- Sylvia Garcia (TX-29)
- Tony Cardenas (CA-29)
- Teresa Leger Fernandez (NM-03)
- Joaquin Castro (TX-20)
- Nanette Barragan (CA-44)
- Filemon Vela (TX-34)
- Darren Soto (FL-09)
- Mike Levin (CA-49)
- Jim Costa (CA-16)
- Ritchie Torres (NY-15)
- Albio Sires (NJ-08)
- Lori Trahan (MA-03)
- Gregorio Sablan (MP-AL)
- Michael San Nicolas (GU-AL)
- Katherine Clark (MA-05)
- Jerrold Nadler (NY-10)
- Jim McGovern (MA-02)
- Bonnie Watson Coleman (NJ-12)
- Debbie Wasserman Schultz (FL-23)
- Peter Welch (VT-AL)
- Suzanne Bonamici (OR-01)
- Mary Gay Scanlon (PA-05)
- Lisa Blunt Rochester (DE-AL)
- Kathy Manning (NC-06)
- Steven Horsford (NV-04)
- Gerald Connolly (VA-11)
- Jimmy Panetta (CA-20)
- Mark Takano (CA-41)
- Diana DeGette (CO-01)
- Brenda Lawrence (MI-14)
- Eleanor Holmes Norton (DC-AL)
- Sara Jacobs (CA-53)
- Brad Schneider (IL-10)
- Ted Lieu (CA-33)
- Frederica Wilson (FL-24)
- Jerry McNerney (CA-09)
- Adam Schiff (CA-28)
- Betty McCollum (MN-04)
- Val Demings (FL-10)
- Al Green (TX-09)
- Thomas Suozzi (NY-03)
- Marie Newman (IL-03)
- Dwight Evans (PA-03)
- Carolyn Maloney (NY-12)
- Gregory Meeks (NY-05)
- Anthony G. Brown (MD-04)
- Nikema Williams (GA-05)
- Joe Neguse (CO-02)
- Donald Beyer (VA-08)
- Eric Swalwell (CA-15)
- David Trone (MD-06)
- Lois Frankel (FL-21)
- Frank Pallone (NJ-06)
- John Garamendi (CA-03)
- Dina Titus (NV-01)
- Danny K. Davis (IL-07)
- Doris Matsui (CA-06)
- David Cicilline (RI-01)
- Deborah Ross (NC-02)
- Mondaire Jones (NY-17)
- Marc Veasey (TX-33)
- Earl Blumenauer (OR-03)
- Hank Johnson (GA-04)
- Stacey Plaskett (VI-AL)
- Bobby Rush (IL-01)
- Dutch Ruppersberger (MD-02)
- Kathy Castor (FL-14)
- Mike Quigley (IL-05)
- Jim Cooper (TN-05)
- Julia Brownley (CA-26)
- Sheila Jackson Lee (TX-18)
- Hakeem Jeffries (NY-08)
- Jake Auchincloss (MA-04)
- Alcee Hastings (FL-20)
- Jahana Hayes (CT-05)
- Barbara Lee (CA-13)
- Ted Deutch (FL-22)
- Josh Harder (CA-10)
- André Carson (IN-07)
- Kaiali'i Kahele (HI-02)
- John B. Larson (CT-01)
- Ed Perlmutter (CO-07)
- Chellie Pingree (ME-01)
- Maxine Waters (CA-43)
- Sean Casten (IL-06)
- Mike Thompson (CA-05)
- Anna Eshoo (CA-18)
- Eddie Bernice Johnson (TX-30)
- Lloyd Doggett (TX-35)
- Ann McLane Kuster (NH-02)
- Alan Lowenthal (CA-47)
- Adam Smith (WA-09)
- Mark DeSaulnier (CA-11)
- Seth Moulton (MA-06)
- John Yarmuth (KY-03)
- Rosa DeLauro (CT-03)
- Marilyn Strickland (WA-10)
- Dan Kildee (MI-05)
- Madeleine Dean (PA-04)
- Grace Meng (NY-06)
- Joseph Morelle (NY-25)
- Bill Foster (IL-11)
- Chuy García (IL-04)
- Brian Higgins (NY-26)
- Jared Huffman (CA-02)
- Bill Keating (MA-09)
- Robin Kelly (IL-02)
- Gwen Moore (WI-04)
- Jamie Raskin (MD-08)
- Terri Sewell (AL-07)
- Rick Larsen (WA-02)
- Raja Krishnamoorthi (IL-08)
- Brendan Boyle (PA-02)
- Kweisi Mfume (MD-07)
- Joyce Beatty (OH-03)
- Pramila Jayapal (WA-07)
- David Price (NC-04)
- Mark Pocan (WI-02)
- Marcy Kaptur (OH-09)
- Brad Sherman (CA-30)
- Bill Pascrell (NJ-09)
- Raúl Grijalva (AZ-03)
- Lauren Underwood (IL-14)
- Paul Tonko (NY-20)
- Alma Adams (NC-12)
- Suzan DelBene (WA-01)
- Emanuel Cleaver (MO-05)
- Donald McEachin (VA-04)
- Ro Khanna (CA-17)
- Debbie Dingell (MI-12)
- Jamaal Bowman (NY-16)
- John Sarbanes (MD-03)
- Steve Cohen (TN-09)
- Melanie Stansbury (NM-01)
- Donald Payne Jr. (NJ-10)
- Haley Stevens (MI-11)
- Rashida Tlaib (MI-13)

== Provisions ==
=== Administrative reform ===
The bill would increase the number of immigration courts, judges, and USCIS adjudicators aiming to reduce the backlog of immigration cases. It also provides funding for legal orientation programs and counseling on immigration-related matters. Besides, existing state, local and private not-for-profit programs promoting integration and inclusion, including English language training, would receive supplemental federal funding.

Federal housing programs including FHA mortgage insurance, the Rural Housing Service, and Freddie Mac/Fannie Mae, would be prohibited from discriminating against single-family homebuyers who have DACA status.

State institutions of higher education would no longer be forced to deny resident tuition status to individuals who are not lawfully present in the United States. DACA recipients who received employment authorization would no longer be barred from federal employment on the basis of their non citizenship.

=== Asylum reform ===
Under the legislation, U and T visa applicants, as well as VAWA applicants would receive increased protections. All asylum seekers would also face reduced administrative burdens for their application.

=== Border security ===
In contrast to the Trump administration's policy of building a border wall, this legislation focuses on smart border screening technology and security between ports of entry and enhanced penalties against criminal gangs and drug traffickers.

It also seeks to protect border communities, by increasing CBP agent training and education for professionalism and develops a unified standard of care for those in CBP custody. It creates a Border Community Stakeholder Advisory Committee to investigate misconduct by DHS agents.

=== Employment-based visa reform ===
The bill proposes to reduce the administrative burden for employment-based visas, especially for those with advanced STEM degrees from US universities. This includes making F-1 Visas 'dual-intent' visas; under current law, a prospective student who cannot satisfy a consular official of their intent to return home after their studies would be denied a visa under Section 214(b) of the INA.

In addition, it proposes removing per-country limits in the US visa system. These limits have particularly affected people born in India, for whom current waits for green cards run into several decades. According to a CATO analysis, without removing these limits, a person chargeable to India applying today would need to wait 150 years to get a green card under the EB-2 category. The removal of per-country limits has previously been approved by both houses of Congress, but was never signed into law.

The bill prevents children from aging out of the visa system. Under current law, a child whose parents were awaiting a green card would have no legal status on their own upon reaching the age of 21.

The Department of Homeland Security would be able to adjust the annual cap on employment-based visas based on macro-economic conditions.

=== Family and diversity visa reform ===
The bill raises the cap on diversity green cards from 55,000 per year to 80,000 per year.

Those awaiting family visas would be allowed to join their family members in the United States while they await their green card priority date. It would increase protections for LGBTQ+ families, and families of those who fought along with the United States military in World War II. Unlike with employment-based visas, the per-country limits on family visas would be increased, but not eliminated. The countries of chargeability most affected by per-country limits on family visas are Mexico and the Philippines.

It would reinstate the Central American Minors Program and creates a new Central American Family Reunification program to allow quicker reunification for those with approved family petitions.

=== NO-BAN Act ===
The bill incorporates the provisions of the National-Origin Based Anti Discrimination Act for Nonimmigrants (NO-BAN) Act. This would prevent a future administration from imposing a ban like the one imposed by Donald Trump in Executive Order 13769, popularly labeled as the "Muslim Ban".

=== Nomenclature ===
The bill proposed changing all references to the word "alien" in US law with the word "noncitizen," addressing growing concerns that the term was dehumanizing.

=== Pathways to permanent residence ===
The bill proposed amending the Immigration and Nationality Act's Section 245, which concerns adjustment of status—the process by which a noncitizen already in the United States can acquire lawful permanent residency, commonly known as "green card" status, without having to travel abroad and receive an immigrant visa from a US consular post. Once permanent residence is obtained, immigrants would then have the ability to apply for citizenship after a waiting period and if conduct and civic knowledge requirements are met. The bill did not propose to change the existing adjustment of status rules under INA §245A, which generally allow adjustment of status to those immediately eligible for an immigrant visa. Instead, it would have added the four new pathways to citizenship described below.

==== General eligibility ====
The bill would have applied to noncitizens who were physically present in the U.S. on January 1, 2021, and who remained present until the approval of their application (except for authorized travel, such as that under advance parole or "casual, brief, and innocent" sojourns). Additionally, any non-citizen who left the US under a deportation, removal, or exclusion order or under voluntary departure, and was either outside the US on the January 1 cutoff or illegally re-entered after that date, would be ineligible. However, those who left the US voluntarily or by deportation before January 1, 2021, but on or after January 20, 2017 (the Inauguration of Donald Trump), and were physically present for three continuous years prior to removal or departure, could have the required presence waived based on humanitarian purposes, family unity, or the public interest of the U.S.

The new pathways generally did not apply to those who, on January 1, 2021, were existing green card holders, had refugee or asylee status (which provide their own pathways to citizenship), were lawfully present in a nonimmigrant status, or were paroled into CNMI or Guam and did not reside there on November 28, 2009.

==== Lawful prospective immigrants ====
Under the legislation, any noncitizen (along with their spouse and children) who meets the general requirements above (in particular, note the requirement of residence beginning January 1, 2021, and the exclusion of most noncitizens who currently hold a legal status), would be eligible to receive the newly created "lawful prospective immigrant" status. The status will be valid for renewable 6-year terms so long as the requirements continue to be met. These individuals would not be permanent residents, but would be treated as such under most US laws and would have the right to work legally. They would be eligible to purchase health insurance under the Affordable Care Act's "marketplace" scheme, but would not receive any tax credits for insurance premiums of other ACA benefits. The lawful prospective immigrant card will serve as a travel document, and holders of that status will not need a visa nor advance parole to return to the US after absences of no more than 180 days if they continue to meet the eligibility requirements. They will receive Social Security numbers, as do all individuals authorized to work in the US.

Lawful prospective immigrants will be able to adjust status to lawful permanent residence after maintaining their prospective immigrant status for at least five years, if they have not been absent for more than 180 continuous days without authorization and not due to circumstances beyond their control, and are current on their federal income tax obligations.

==== Childhood arrivals ====
The act would provide a path to permanent residence and citizenship for Deferred Action for Childhood Arrivals beneficiaries and others who entered as children, who currently only hold protection from deportation and work privileges under executive order, not statute.

Any noncitizen who arrived in the US prior to age 18 (whether or not they were accompanied at the time and regardless of the legality of their initial entry) would be able to become a permanent resident, along with their spouse and children, if they have: graduated from high school or obtained a high school equivalency certification; registered for the Selective Service if required; and has either completed 2 years of or finished a bachelor's degree program or a postsecondary vocational program, served in the uniformed services for at least 2 years and not received a less than honorable discharge, or has earned income for at least three years and at least 75% of the total time they have held employment authorization, excepting such periods when they were enrolled in postsecondary education.

Those who already hold DACA status and meet the requirements for renewal of that status, would be able to immediately apply for permanent residence under a streamlined program.

==== Temporary protected status ====
Temporary protected status is a humanitarian protection allowing individuals who were present when an armed conflict or disaster occurred in their home countries to remain and work in the US legally until the triggering conditions subside. By itself, it currently does not provide any pathway to citizenship or lawful permanent residence, though time spent under TPS is not unlawful presence and does not prevent later applications that are otherwise available.

The US Citizenship Act would provide TPS beneficiaries and those under Deferred Enforced Departure, a similar humanitarian program, with the ability to obtain permanent residence for themselves, their spouse, and their children, if they have been present in the US continuously since January 1, 2017 and were eligible for TPS or DED on that date.

==== Agricultural workers ====
Any non-citizen, including those who worked lawfully under the H-2A temporary agricultural worker program, may become a permanent resident if they have performed at least 2,300 hours or 400 days of agricultural labor or services, and meet the general requirements above. Agricultural labor or services is as defined under the H-2A program or the Migrant and Seasonal Agricultural Workers Protection Act of 1983. The individuals' spouse and children need not meet the work requirement themselves.

=== Root causes of migration ===
To address what the Biden administration considers the 'root cause of migration', the legislation allows for up to $4 billion in aid to Guatemala, El Salvador, and Honduras, "conditioned on their ability to reduce the endemic corruption, violence, and poverty that causes people to flee their home countries".

It would also create Designated Processing Centers throughout Central America, allowing displaced persons to apply for resettlement either to the United States or to partner countries.

== Legislative history ==
As of April 10, 2024:

Congress	Short title	Bill number(s)	Date introduced	Sponsor(s)	# of cosponsors	Latest status
117th Congress	U.S Citizenship Act of 2021	H.R. 1177	February 18, 2021	Linda Sánchez (D-CA)	153	Died in Committee.
117th Congress	U.S Citizenship Act of 2021	S.348	February 22, 2021	Bob Menendez (D-NJ)	26	Died in Committee.
118th Congress	U.S Citizenship Act of 2023	H.R. 3194	May 10, 2023	Linda Sánchez (D-CA)	118	Referred to committees of jurisdiction.

Lobbying for the bill in the United States Senate was led by Sen. Bob Menendez, who indicated gathering the necessary 10 Republican votes would be a 'herculean' challenge. Democrats have indicated they are unlikely to take up this bill immediately, instead focusing on advancing piecemeal legislation in the form of the American Dream and Promise Act of 2021 and the Farm Workforce Modernization Act of 2021. Joe Biden has indicated that he would be open to this piecemeal approach.

== Related actions ==
In addition to sending the bill to Congress, on his first day in office, Joe Biden signed three orders related to immigration. The first, in a Presidential Memorandum to the Attorney General of the United States and the Secretary of Homeland Security, aims to reinstate the DACA program. The second, in the form of a Presidential Proclamation, overturns the travel ban imposed by Donald Trump through Executive Order 13780. The third was an Executive Order reversing Executive Order 13768, which had declared "sanctuary" cities that refused to comply with immigration enforcement measures ineligible to receive Federal grants. Another Presidential Proclamation halted the construction of the Mexico-United States barrier by ending the emergency declaration that allowed Donald Trump to divert U.S. Department of Defense funds for its construction.

== See also ==
- Bipartisan Border Bill
- Immigration policy of the Joe Biden administration
- Illegal immigration to the United States
