= Pat Proctor =

American politician

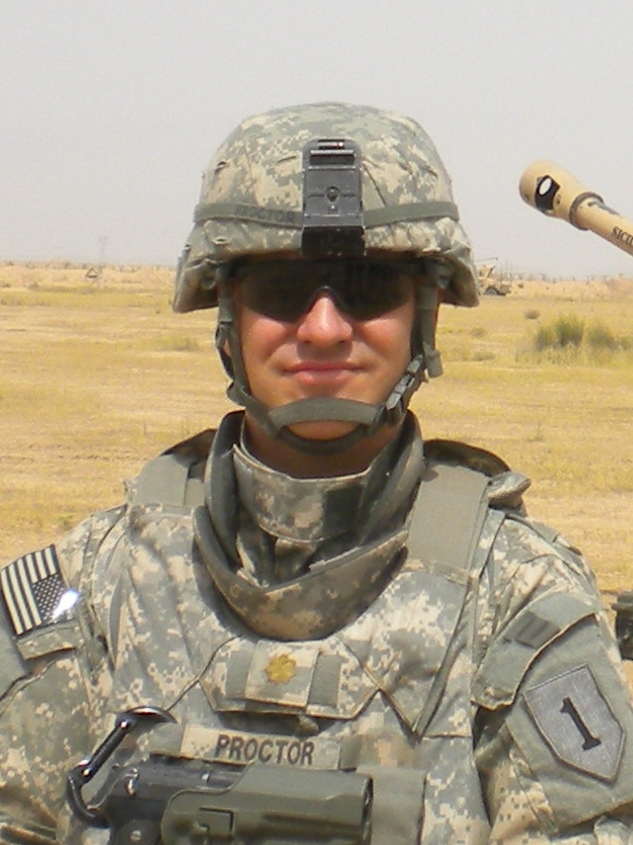
- Proctor at COB Speicher in Tikrit, Iraq, 2010

Secretary of State-elect of Kansas
- Assuming office January 11, 2027
- Governor: Cindy Holscher (elect)
- Succeeding: Scott Schwab

Member of the Kansas House of Representatives from the 41st district
- Incumbent
- Assumed office January 11, 2021
- Preceded by: Jeff Pittman

Personal details
- Born: June 14, 1971 (age 55)
- Party: Republican
- Spouse: Aree
- Education: Purdue University (BS); United States Army Command and General Staff College (MMAS, MMAS); Kansas State University (PhD); United States Army War College (MS)

Military service
- Allegiance: United States
- Branch/service: United States Army
- Rank: Colonel
- Battles/wars: War in Afghanistan; Iraq War

Patrick E. Proctor (born June 14, 1971) is an American politician serving as a member of the Kansas House of Representatives, representing the 41st district since 2021. First elected in 2020, Proctor's district includes Fort Leavenworth and Leavenworth, Kansas.

Proctor is a retired United States Army colonel and the Republican Party nominee for Kansas Secretary of State in 2026.

== Career ==
Proctor is a retired United States Army colonel. He settled in Leavenworth, Kansas, upon retirement from the Army. Proctor is a graduate of the School of Advanced Military Studies. Proctor most recently deployed to Jordan as a battalion commander. In 2009, he deployed as the operations officer for Task Force Patriot (2nd Battalion, 32nd Field Artillery) to Saddam Hussein's hometown of Tikrit, Iraq. In 2007, Proctor worked as part of the Joint Strategic Assessment Team, a team of diplomats, military theorists, and intellectuals assembled by Gen. David Petraeus and Ambassador Ryan Crocker and led by Col. H.R. McMaster to develop the strategy for post-surge Iraq.

Proctor is an assistant professor of homeland security at Wichita State University. Proctor is also a wargame developer and founder of ProSIM Company. The company develops computer wargames that are published by distributor Shrapnel Games. ProSIM is known for its simulations of modern warfare, including titles such as BCT Commander, Armored Task Force, and Air Assault Task Force. ProSIM has also worked with military contractors such as Boeing and Lockheed Martin to produce ground combat simulations.

Proctor and his wife, Aree, co-own Leavenworth restaurants Baan Thai Restaurant Inc. and Noodles of Asia. In 2016, the U.S. Department of Labor approached Proctor for failure to record employees' hours, violations of federal minimum wage law, and failure to pay required overtime over the course of the previous two years. Proctor blamed the violations on federal bureaucrats. Baan Thai Restaurant was ultimately cited for 41 violations and fined $93,008.

== Political career ==
In the 2020 Kansas House of Representatives election, Proctor ran for the 41st district of the Kansas House of Representatives. The seat was open following Democratic incumbent Jeff Pittman's decision to run for the Kansas Senate. During the campaign, Proctor stated he opposed Medicaid expansion, instead supporting using the funds to support small businesses. He defeated Democratic Leavenworth mayor Mike Griswold, flipping the seat to the Republican Party.

In 2022, Proctor was re-elected with 51.7% of the vote over Democratic nominee Harry Schwarz.

In March 2023, Proctor and Leavenworth school board member Vanessa Reid visited the David Brewer Elementary School library, where Proctor took a photo of a student's drawing of a pride flag and wrote "It was clear that the school library was doing more indoctrinating than educating" in his official newsletter. Proctor also reiterated his support for Reid, who faced calls to resign after joking that the best attribute in a new superintendent would be "blue eyes."

In 2024, Proctor was re-elected over Democratic nominee Aimee Bateman. The race was noted by the The Topeka Capital-Journal as a priority for Democrats to break the Republican Party's supermajority in the body.

In April 2025, Proctor announced his campaign for secretary of state of Kansas in the 2026 election.

== Writings ==
Since 2008, Proctor has been an active freelance writer. He has been published in the US Army War College journal, Parameters, and online at StrategyPage.com and Armchair General. He just completed work on his fourth book, Lessons Unlearned: The U.S. Army's Role in Creating the Forever-Wars in Afghanistan and Iraq. This book will be published by the University of Missouri Press in February 2020.

- Proctor, Pat (Spring 2008). "The Mythical Shia Crescent" (PDF). Parameters. 38 (1): 30–42. Archived from the original (PDF) on June 7, 2010.
- Proctor, Pat (November 2009). "Decision at Talil Airbase". Armchair General.
- Proctor, Pat (with Carolyn Wheater and Jane R. Burstein), ASVAB AFQT Cram Plan, (New York: Cliffs Notes, 2010), ISBN 978-0-470-59889-4.
- Proctor, Pat, Media War: The Media-Enabled Insurgency in Iraq, (Manhattan, KS: ProSIM, 2010), ISBN 978-0-615-43267-0.
- Proctor, Pat (Spring 2011). "Message vs. Perception during the 'Americanization' of the Vietnam War". The Historian. 73 (5). doi:10.1111/j.1540-6563.2010.00287.x. S2CID 145247884. Archived from the original on June 7, 2011.
- Proctor, Pat (March–April 2011). "Fighting to Understand". Military Review. 40 (7). Archived from the original on June 8, 2010.
- Proctor, Pat; Oakley, Dave (Spring 2012). "Ten Years of GWOT, the Failure of Democratization and the Fallacy of "Ungoverned Spaces"". Journal of Strategic Security. 5 (1).
- Proctor, Pat (Summer 2012). "War without Violence: Leveraging the Arab Spring to Win the War on Terrorism". Journal of Strategic Security. 5 (2): 47–64. doi:10.5038/1944-0472.5.2.3.
- Proctor, Pat, Task Force Patriot and the End of Combat Operations in Iraq, (Lanham, MD: Government Institutes, 2012), ISBN 978-1-60590-777-2.
- Proctor, Pat, Containment and Credibility: The Ideology and Deception that Plunged America into the Vietnam War, (New York: Carrel Books, 2016), ISBN 978-1631440564.
- Proctor, Pat (Winter 2017–18). "Lessons Unlearned: Army Transformation and Low-Intensity Conflict" (PDF). Parameters. 47 (4): 33–45.
- Proctor, Pat, Lessons Unlearned: The U.S. Army's Role in Creating the Forever Wars in Afghanistan and Iraq, (Columbia, MO: University of Missouri, 2020), ISBN 978-0826221940.

Proctor also maintains a blog, Media Warfare, which covers various topics and includes discussion of wargames, book reviews, and commentary on current events.

== Notes ==
Political offices
Preceded by Scott Schwab	Secretary of State of Kansas; Taking office 2027	Elect
