= Marvin Kleeb =

American politician

Member of the Kansas House of Representatives from the 48th district
- In office January 12, 2009 – January 10, 2017
- Preceded by: Jeff Colyer
- Succeeded by: Abraham Rafie

Personal details
- Born: December 21, 1956 (age 69)
- Party: Republican

Marvin Kleeb (born December 21, 1956) is a former Republican member of the Kansas House of Representatives, representing the 48th district from 2009 to 2017. After re-election in 2016, he decided to retire and was replaced by Abraham Rafie.

Kleeb is a member of the Kansas National Federation of Independent Businesses State Council, Mid-America Personnel and Staffing Services, and the Overland Park Rotary.

== Issue positions ==
Kleeb's website lists his legislative priorities as economic development, jobs growth and retention, education, fiscally responsible government and fair taxes, healthcare, a comprehensive and strategic energy plan, and seniors. In 2016, the American Conservative Union gave him a lifetime rating of 79%

== Committee membership ==
- Taxation
- Transportation
- Judiciary

== Major Donors ==
The top 5 donors to Kleeb's 2008 campaign:

- 1. Tall T Enterprises Inc $1,000
- 2. Kansas Chamber of Commerce $500
- 3. Home Builders Assoc of Greater Kansas City $500
- 4. Hartman, Jill $500
- 5. Kansas Medical Society $500
