= Abraham Rafie =

American politician

Member of the Kansas House of Representatives from the 48th district
- In office 2017–2018
- Preceded by: Marvin Kleeb
- Succeeded by: David Benson

Personal details
- Party: Republican
- Education: University of Texas (MD)

Abraham B. Rafie is an American politician who served for one term as a Republican member of the Kansas House of Representatives, from 2017 to 2018. He represented the 48th District in the Kansas House, residing in Overland Park, Kansas.

In addition to his time in the state legislature, Rafie worked as a diagnostic radiologist.
