= American Dream and Promise Act =

2021 United States legislative bill

- Long title: To authorize the cancellation of removal and adjustment of status of certain aliens, and for other purposes.
- Announced in: the 119th United States Congress
- Number of co-sponsors: 221

Legislative history
- Introduced in the House of Representatives as H.R. 1589 by Rep. Sylvia Garcia (D–TX) on February 26, 2025; Committee consideration by House Judiciary, House Education and Labor

The American Dream and Promise Act is a proposed United States law that would incorporate the provisions of the DACA program into federal law. Up to 4.4 million DREAMers would be eligible for Conditional Permanent Residence or Temporary Protected Status. The bill is a reintroduced version of a bill by the same name that was passed in the House of Representatives in the 116th Congress, but was never taken up by the Senate. The provisions of the bill granting pathways to permanent residence are less expansive than the US Citizenship Act of 2021, however, Democrats have indicated they are more likely to progress this bill, along with the accompanying Farm Workforce Modernization Act of 2021 since it is more likely to receive the 60 votes needed in the United States Senate.

== Provisions ==
The bill contains 3 routes to obtaining lawful status in the United States.

=== Expedited permanent residence for DACA recipients ===
DACA recipients would be eligible for 'streamlined' processing of conditional permanent residence, including not having to pay an additional fee, or, if they already meet the qualifying criteria for removing the conditional status, would be eligible to apply for adjustment of status to full permanent residence immediately. In the latter case, the normal adjustment of status fee may be charged.

=== Conditional permanent residence ===
Any person meeting all of the following criteria would be eligible for conditional permanent residence.

- Continuously resident in the United States before January 1, 2021
- Were 18 years or younger on the date of their initial entry to the United States
- Pass security and law enforcement background checks and pay a reasonable fee
- Not have been convicted of any of the following. Note that crimes where immigration status is an essential element of the crime do not count:
  - A federal or state crime punishable by a term of more than 1 year
  - 3 or more crimes committed at different dates where the person was sentenced to an aggregate of 90 days or more
  - A crime of domestic violence (unless the person is themselves a victim of domestic violence)
- Graduate from high school or obtain a GED

After receiving conditional status, recipients would have 10 years to meet the requirements for full permanent residence. In order to be eligible they must still meet the criteria above, and fulfill one of these conditions:

- Have received at least 2 years worth of post-secondary academic credit; or
- Completed at 2 years of military service, and if discharged, have received an honorable discharge
- Have accumulated at least 3 years of employment, 75% of which was obtained while having lawful work authorization.

=== Temporary protected status ===
Nationals of those countries that are considered unsafe to accept return who have received Temporary Protected Status or Deferred Enforced Departure would receive LPR status and have all removal proceedings cancelled if they meet the following criteria:

- Have been in the United States for at least 3 years at the date the act is adopted
- Were eligible for TPS on September 17, 2017, or had DED status on January 20, 2021.

== Legislative history ==
As of November 18, 2026:

Congress	Short title	Bill number(s)	Date introduced	Sponsor(s)	# of cosponsors	Latest status
116th Congress	American Dream and Promise Act of 2019	H.R. 6	March 12, 2019	Lucille Roybal-Allard (D-CA)	232	Passed in the House (237-187)
116th Congress	American Dream and Promise Act of 2019	S.874	March 26, 2019	Lindsey Graham (R-SC)	5	Died in Committee
117th Congress	American Dream and Promise Act of 2021	H.R. 6	March 3, 2021	Lucille Roybal-Allard (D-CA)	175	Passed in the House (228-197)
117th Congress	American Dream and Promise Act of 2021	S. 264	February 4, 2021	Dick Durbin (D-IL)	1	Died in Committee
118th Congress	American Dream and Promise Act of 2023	H.R. 16	June 15, 2023	Sylvia Garcia (D-TX)	188	Died in Committee
119th Congress	American Dream and Promise Act of 2025	H.R. 1589	February 26, 2025	Sylvia Garcia (D-TX)	221	Referred to Committee

== See also ==
- DREAM Act
- American Dream
