= Hyman Brand Hebrew Academy =

Location
- 5801 W. 115th Street, Overland Park, Kansas 66211; United States; 38.9184°N 94.6526°W

Information
- School type: Private Religious School
- Religious affiliation: Judaism
- Established: 1966
- Head of school: Annie Glickman
- Grades: K–12
- Gender: Coed
- Enrollment: 199
- Student to teacher ratio: 6.2:1
- Colors: Blue; White
- Mascot: Rams
- Website: http://www.hbha.edu

Hyman Brand Hebrew Academy is a K-12 community Jewish Day School located on the Jewish Community Campus in Overland Park, Kansas, United States. A private school offering Judaic instruction along with a college-preparatory secular education, HBHA serves about 200 students from diverse reform through orthodox backgrounds. A 2005 Blue Ribbon Kansas School, Hyman Brand Hebrew Academy celebrated its 50th anniversary in the 2015–16 school year.

== History ==
Hyman Brand Hebrew Academy was founded in 1966 by a group of parents seeking a Jewish day school education for their children in Kansas City. Initially named Hebrew Academy, the school began with 33 students in a rented space at Ohev Shalom Synagogue. With each year, new grades were added, and by 1973, the school had grown to include an upper school and graduated its first class in 1976. In 1978, the school was renamed Hyman Brand Hebrew Academy in honor of its first president, Hyman Brand. As enrollments continued to increase, the school outgrew the synagogue and relocated to a former Blue Valley elementary school before relocating again in 1988 to its current location at the Jewish Community Center of Greater Kansas City in Overland Park.

Hyman Brand Hebrew Academy follows the philosophy of tikkun olam, a Hebrew phrase meaning "world repair". Following the 2014 Jewish Community Center shooting, Hyman Brand recommitted to their social justice work.

== Jewish Connections ==
Hyman Brand Hebrew Academy is deeply rooted in its Jewish nature. Throughout the school year, Hyman Brand Hebrew Academy teaches its students about Jewish culture and holidays though classes and special programs. Every Friday morning, Hyman Brand Hebrew Academy hosts a 20 minute ceremony called "Taste of Shabbat" where groups of students say the prayers of the Jewish holiday Shabbat.
