= Armored Task Force =

2002 video game

The Armored Task Force is a computer wargame developed by ProSIM Company and published by Shrapnel Games in 2002. The lead developer was Pat Proctor, the founder of ProSIM Company.

== Gameplay ==
The game is a combat simulation that includes four campaigns in the following settings:

- Death Valley, California.
- The National Training Center in Fort Irwin, California.
- A hypothetical World War III in the Fulda Gap.
- A fictional war in Iraq (the game was created before Operation Iraqi Freedom).

The gameplay framework was built on the real-time gameplay of its predecessor, BCT Commander. The game has an AI and hierarchy system that allows players to command their forces, from individual vehicles to larger units.

The game engine for Armored Task Force inspired a series of ProSIM games, including The Falklands War: 1982, Raging: The Second Korean War, and The Star and the Crescent.

== Reception ==
In a preview, The Wargamer said the game "[...] looks to be a detailed and groundbreaking simulation of modern armored combat at the individual vehicle level."
