= Jennifer Day (Kansas politician) =

American politician

Member of the Kansas House of Representatives from the 48th district
- In office June 3, 2020 – June 30, 2021
- Preceded by: David Benson
- Succeeded by: Dan Osman

Personal details
- Party: Democratic
- Education: Marymount College (attended); Pepperdine University (BA)

Jennifer Day is an American politician who served as a member of the Kansas House of Representatives representing the 48th district in Johnson County, Kansas, from June 3, 2020, to June 30, 2021. She was appointed to the seat on May 24, 2020, by Democratic Party committee members to complete the term of Democratic Rep. David Benson, who resigned. Day was appointed after the Kansas Legislature adjourned the 2020 legislative session.

Day co-sponsored legislation to prohibit the hiring law enforcement officers with a history of misconduct allegations and make certain law enforcement disciplinary records public. The bill was introduced into the state House of Representatives on June 3, 2020, at the start of the special session.

Day resigned from the Legislature on June 30, 2021, due to a move out of her district. Johnson County Democrats picked attorney Dan Osman to complete the remaining 18 months on her term.

2021–2022 Kansas House of Representatives Committee assignments

- Financial Institutions and Rural Development
- Taxation
- Corrections and Juvenile Justice
