= Ken Rahjes =

American politician

Member of the Kansas House of Representatives from the 110th district
- Incumbent
- Assumed office January 11, 2016
- Preceded by: Travis Couture-Lovelady

Personal details
- Born: May 16, 1966 (age 60) Wichita, Kansas, U.S.
- Party: Republican
- Spouse: Lori
- Children: 4
- Education: Colby Community College (attended); Kansas State University (attended)

Ken Rahjes (May 16, 1966) is an American politician from the state of Kansas. A Republican, Rahjes is a member of the Kansas House of Representatives, representing the 110th district.

Rahjes was appointed to the Kansas House in January 2016, following the resignation of Travis Couture-Lovelady. He was reelected in 2018.
