= Title 42 expulsion =

Type of removal of persons by the US government

Section 362 of the Public Health Service Act (42 U.S.C. § 265) governs suspension of entries to prevent spread of communicable diseases. Shown: expulsions from the southwest U.S. border at the time of the COVID-19 pandemic.

A Title 42 expulsion is the removal, out of the territory of the United States, by the U.S. government, of a person who has recently been in a country where a communicable disease was present. The extent of authority for such contagion-related expulsions is set out in federal law in section 362 of the Public Health Service Act of 1944 (42 U.S.C. § 265).

During the COVID-19 pandemic, the Centers for Disease Control and Prevention (CDC) under the Trump administration, used this provision to generally block land entry for many migrants. This practice was initially continued by the Biden administration but was halted with the end of the COVID-19 national emergency, on May 12, 2023. Title 42 of the United States Code includes numerous sections dealing with public health, social welfare, and civil rights, but, in the context of immigration, the phrase "Title 42" came to be used to refer specifically to expulsions under section 362.

The program allows U.S. Customs and Border Protection (CBP) to prohibit the entry of persons who potentially pose a health risk by being subject to previously announced travel restrictions or by unlawfully entering the country to bypass health-screening measures. Persons subject to the order are not held in congregate areas for processing and are instead immediately expelled to their country of last transit. If they are unable to be returned to the country of last transit (because that country will not accept them due to their nationality), CBP will work with its interagency partners to expel the person to their country of origin. In some cases, this is not possible, and migrants may be expelled to a third country that will accept them based on previous residency. Expulsions under Title 42 are not based on immigration status and are tracked separately from immigration. At the discretion of the presidential administration, Title 42 can be used even for people who would normally have temporary protected status based on their country of origin.

The CDC's policy under Title 42 was unenforceable from November 15, 2022, when D.C. federal judge Emmet G. Sullivan ruled that the policy is a violation of the Administrative Procedure Act, until December 19 when the chief justice of the United States, John Roberts, issued a temporary hold on Sullivan's ruling, followed by the full court in a 5–4 vote on December 27.

In the days preceding the policy's repeal on May 11, 2023, the number of migrants crossing the border increased. To mitigate the potential surge in border crossings following the end of Title 42, the federal government implemented new rules for incoming migrants at the US-Mexico border. These new rules bar from the United States those who attempt to enter illegally for five years if they do not qualify for asylum. The new rule also presumes that migrants are ineligible for asylum if they did not arrive at a legal port of entry or if they passed through other countries first without seeking asylum. This policy has contributed to a decline in both 'gotaways' and border encounters as those who are apprehended are subject to stricter rules upon removal from the United States if they were to attempt to reenter.

== Statutory text ==
Section 362 of the Public Health Service Act of 1944 (42 U.S.C. § 265), the statutory authority in question, reads as follows:

§362. Suspension of entries and imports from designated places to prevent spread of communicable diseases

Whenever the Surgeon General determines that by reason of the existence of any communicable disease in a foreign country there is serious danger of the introduction of such disease into the United States, and that this danger is so increased by the introduction of persons or property from such country that a suspension of the right to introduce such persons and property is required in the interest of the public health, the Surgeon General, in accordance with regulations approved by the President, shall have the power to prohibit, in whole or in part, the introduction of persons and property from such countries or places as he shall designate in order to avert such danger, and for such period of time as he may deem necessary for such purpose.

== History ==
=== 2020 ===
In March 2020, the Center for Disease Control under the Trump administration issued a public health order allowing for the rapid expulsion of unauthorized border crossers and asylum seekers, citing COVID-19 concerns. As it is considered an "expulsion" rather than a "deportation", the migrants were not afforded the right to make a case to stay in the U.S. before an immigration judge. Most migrants subject to the orders were returned to Mexico within hours. Trump advisor Stephen Miller had a role in shaping the policy, and has since defended it in interviews.

In November 2020, a federal court ordered a halt to the practice in regard to unaccompanied minor children; on January 29, 2021, the stay was lifted by DC Circuit Court of Appeals, allowing minors to be expelled pending its review of the case.

=== 2021 ===
In February 2021, Mexico stopped accepting families with children under the program. Physicians for Human Rights noted that the policy had been applied unfairly against migrants and asylees and that its stated purpose of containing the spread of COVID-19 was dubious as the U.S. continued to allow millions of people to cross the US–Mexico border weekly. In early February 2021, the Mexican government announced that it would stop accepting non-Mexican family units with minor children returned to Mexico under Title 42.

In June 2021, it was reported that the Biden administration had been considering rescinding Title 42. However, in September 2021, NPR reported that the administration had defended Title 42 expulsion in court under the pretext of slowing the spread of COVID-19.

In December 2021, Anne Schuchat, the second-highest official at the CDC, testified that the expulsions of migrants under Title 42 lacked a sufficient public health rationale.

=== 2022 ===
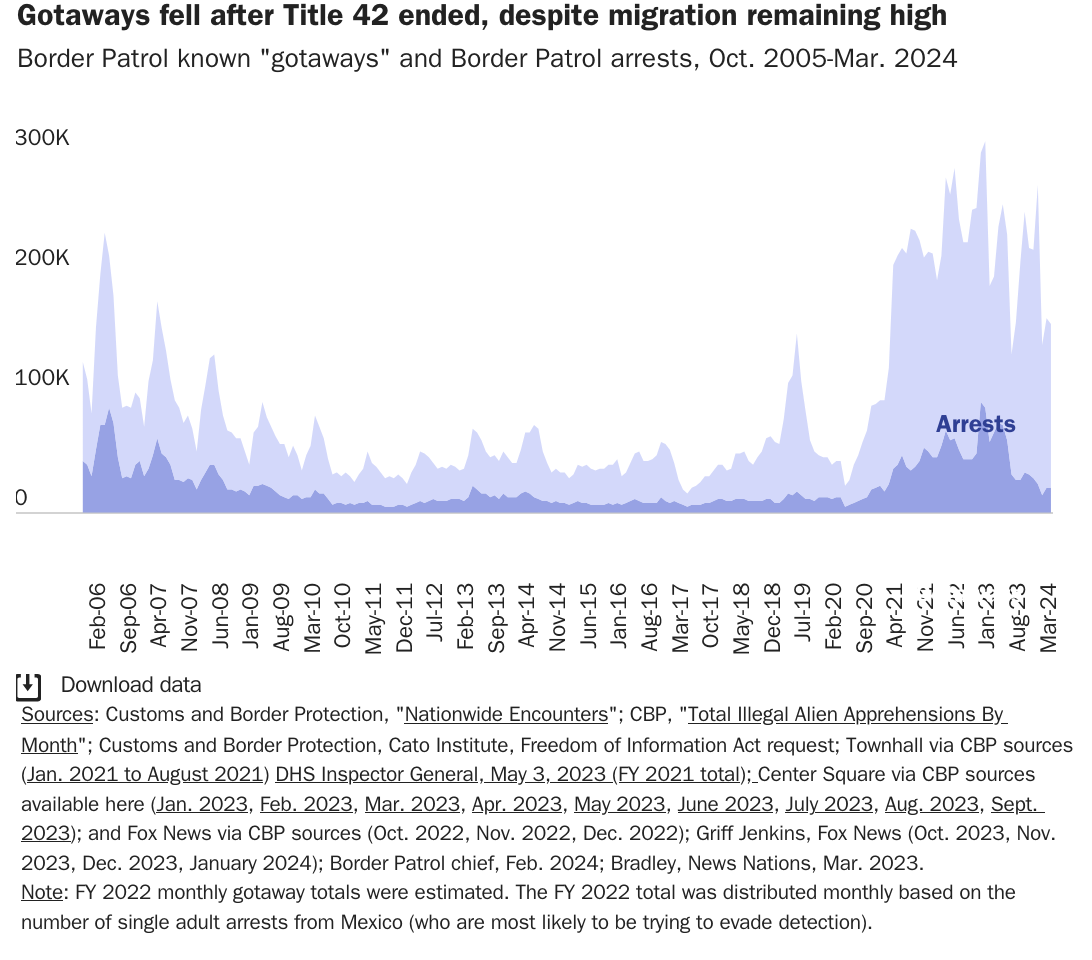
Arrests (light blue) and gotaways (dark blue)

In March 2022, the DC Circuit Court of Appeals ruled that the Biden administration could continue to swiftly remove migrant families under Title 42, but "only to places where they will not be persecuted or tortured."

On April 1, 2022, the CDC officially announced they would end Title 42 expulsions. However, in order to allow for the implementation of a vaccine program to get migrants vaccinated at the border, the policy was not scheduled to officially end until May 23, 2022. On May 20, federal judge for the United States District Court for the Western District of Louisiana, Robert R. Summerhays, issued a ruling blocking the CDC from ending Title 42 expulsions.

That same month, in response to the Russian invasion of Ukraine two months earlier, the Biden administration introduced an unprecedented streamlined program for any Ukrainian nationals who pass various checks and are sponsored by various organizations under the "Uniting for Ukraine" program to be exempted from Title 42 and get humanitarian parole and work permits. In October 2022, it introduced a similar program for Venezuelan nationals, who must arrive by air. The number of Venezuelans was capped at 24,000, and those arriving by crossing into Mexico or Panama illegally would start to be expelled under Title 42. Amnesty International and Human Rights Watch criticized the latter aspect of the plan.

Arizona v. Mayorkas
- Court: United States District Court for the District of Columbia
- Docket nos.: 1:21-cv-00100 (D.D.C.); 22-5325 (D.C. Cir.); 22-592 (SCOTUS)

Case history
- Appealed to: Court of Appeals for the District of Columbia Circuit
- Subsequent action: district ruling stayed by Supreme Court via shadow docket

Court membership
- Judge sitting: Emmet G. Sullivan

On November 15, 2022, Senior Judge of the United States District Court for the District of Columbia, Emmet G. Sullivan, ruled that expulsions under Title 42 were a violation of the Administrative Procedure Act, noting that the policy was an "arbitrary and capricious" violation of the Act. The ruling required the United States government to process all asylum seekers under immigration law as previous to Title 42's implementation, and Sullivan specifically called out the CDC for intentionally ignoring the negative effects of implementing Title 42 and not considering alternative approaches to expulsion such as vaccination, outdoor processing, and allowing asylum seekers to quarantine with U.S. relatives. Sullivan opined that the policy had no rational basis as COVID-19 was already widespread throughout the U.S. when the program was initiated. The ruling was celebrated by the ACLU, a plaintiff in the case.

In response to the ruling, a group of states seeking to keep the policy in place appealed to the U.S. Supreme Court, and on December 19, 2022, Chief Justice John Roberts temporarily maintained Title 42 and stayed the decision by Judge Emmet G. Sullivan. On December 27, the Supreme Court granted a stay against Sullivan's decision with a 5–4 split. The case, Arizona v. Mayorkas, was set for oral argument, though it was about whether the states were allowed to intervene, rather than the merits of the policy.

=== 2023 ===
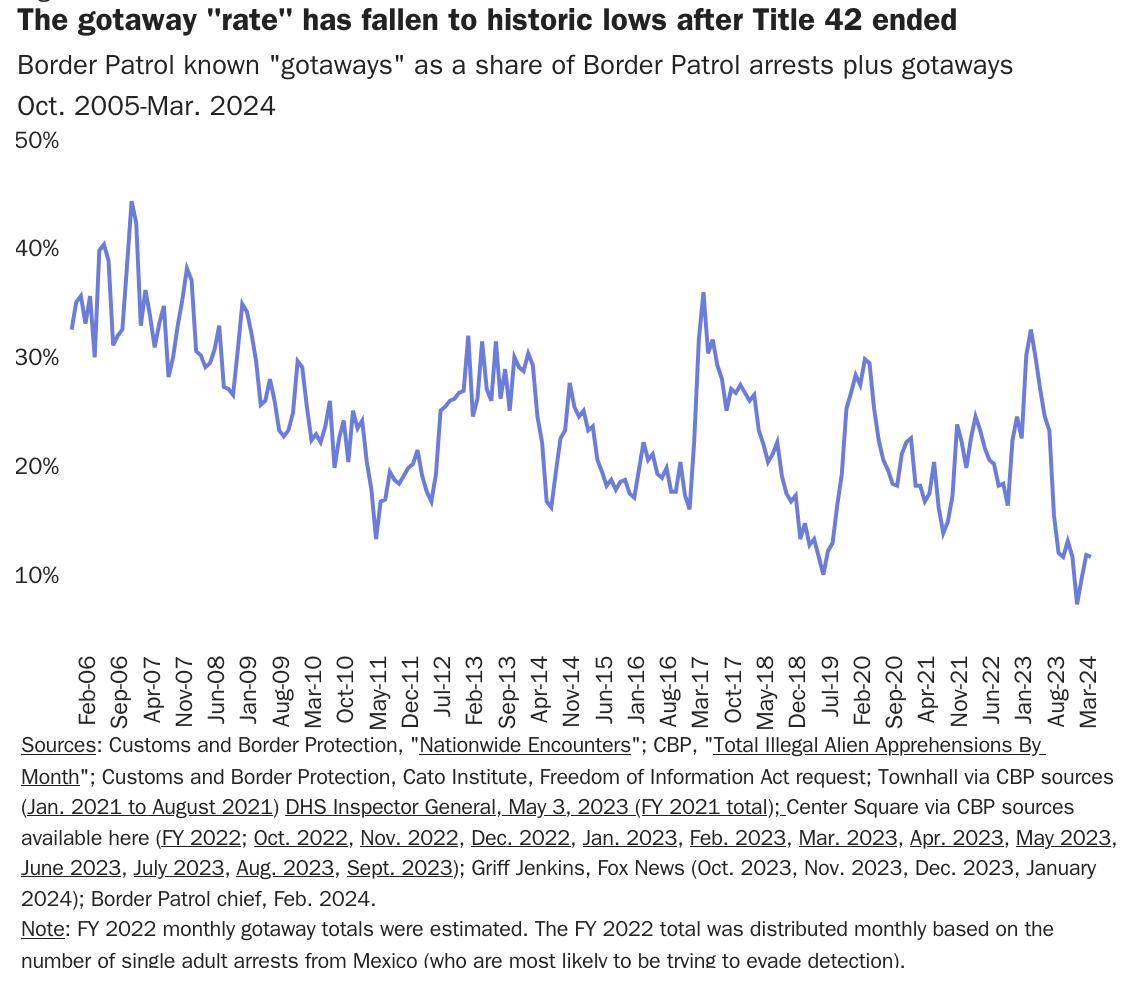
'Gotaway' rate fell to historic lows after Title 42 ended in May 2023

The Biden administration lifted the order authorizing Title 42 on May 11, 2023, when the federal government ended the official national emergency on COVID-19. Senators Thom Tillis and Kyrsten Sinema in May 2023 introduced a bill to extend Title 42, but it was never was voted on. The House of Representatives also passed a Republican-led bill to improve border security following the end of Title 42, but it failed in the Senate. In order to mitigate any potential increase in migrants due to the end of this policy, the Biden administration announced plans to strengthen the number of troops stationed at the U.S.–Mexico border. U.S. cities expected to receive some of these migrants once they crossed the border. New York City said it was receiving 500 cases a day and expected that number to rise after Title 42 expired on May 11. The Texas cities of Brownsville, Laredo, and El Paso declared a state of emergency in anticipation of more migrants. Texas governor Greg Abbott also announced that Texas would resume a program to send migrants to cities controlled by Democrats, such as Los Angeles, Chicago, Denver, and Washington, D.C.

== Reception ==
Title 42, which resulted in many repeat attempts from people expelled, led to illegal border crossings at record levels between 2021 and 2023, averaging around 2 million people per year, as well as an increase in 'gotaways' which dropped to a record low rate after Title 42 expired. This drop in gotaways allows border patrol to apprehend more criminals and make the border more secure. In fiscal year 2023, CBP figures showed that 169 people on the United States’ terrorist watch list were arrested at the border, compared to 98 in the previous fiscal year and 15 in 2021. In the year after Title 42 ended, the Biden administration deported more people than in any year since 2010.

=== Criticism ===
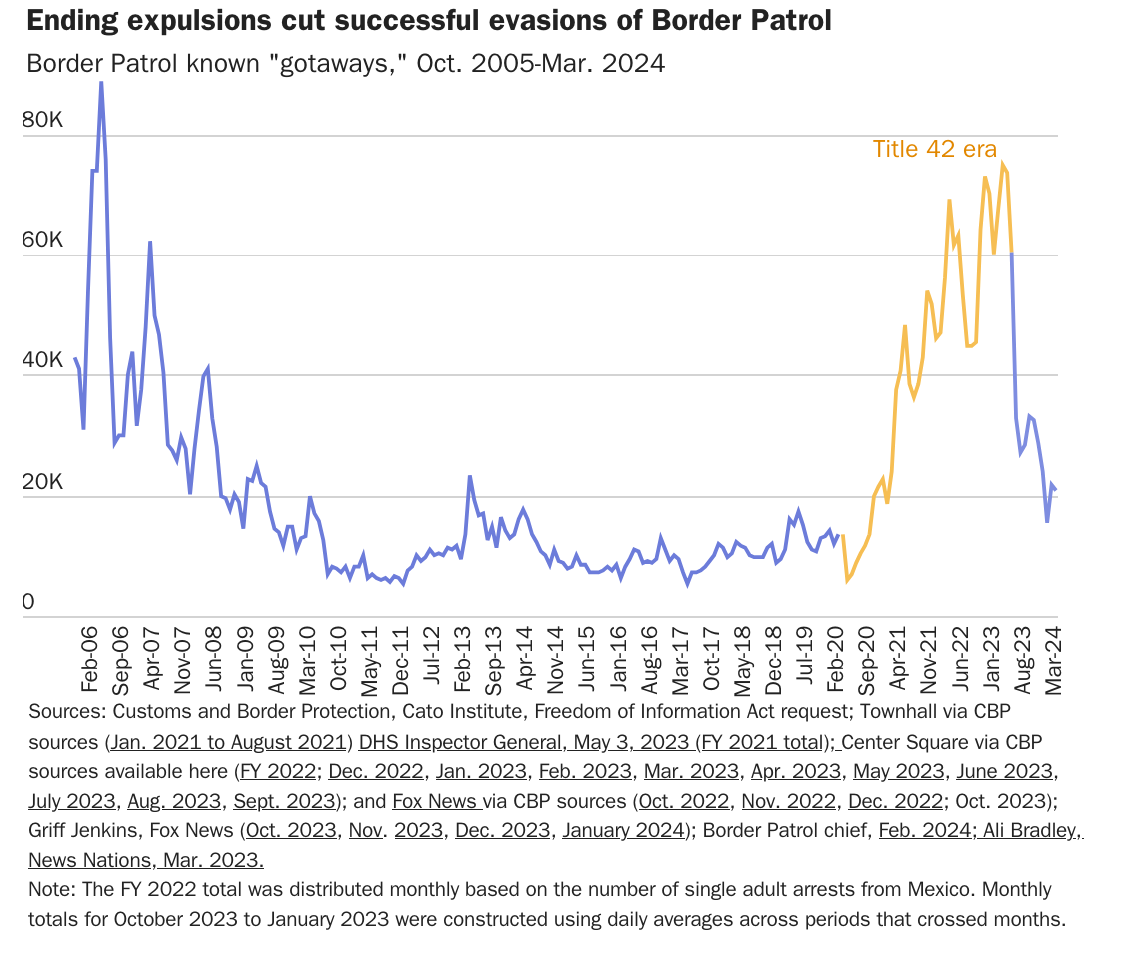
'Gotaways' surged during Title 42 compared to Title 8

Title 42 has been criticized by several human rights groups including the American Civil Liberties Union, Amnesty International USA, Human Rights Watch, Human Rights First, and the American Immigration Council. These groups argue that the policy allows the United States to illegally expel asylum seekers without any legal process.

In February 2021, more than 60 congresspeople, led by Congresswoman Frederica S. Wilson, House Foreign Affairs Committee Chair Gregory W. Meeks, Congresswoman Pramila Jayapal, and Homeland Security Committee Chair Bennie G. Thompson, sent a letter to Homeland Security Secretary Alejandro Mayorkas calling on him to end the practice. In the letter, they argued that Mayorkas should employ alternative forms of humanitarian relief for detainees subject to deportation for the remainder of the pandemic.

More criminals were allowed to enter the United States due to the overwhelming number of border crossings fueled by Title 42, with repeat migrants who did not face the same penalties for trying to reenter the country if they were processed under Title 42 in comparison to Title 8.

== Statistics ==
Title 42 expulsions listed by month and by department from March 2020 to May 2023:

Month	U.S. Border Patrol	Office of Field Operations	Total
March 2020	7,094	76	7,170
April 2020	15,018	526	15,544
May 2020	20,084	875	20,959
June 2020	28,534	1,423	29,957
July 2020	35,444	1,694	37,138
August 2020	42,808	2,272	45,080
September 2020	48,839	2,546	51,385
October 2020 (FY 2021 start)	63,006	2,777	65,783
November 2020	61,326	2,454	63,780
December 2020	60,535	2,498	63,033
January 2021	62,383	2,230	64,613
February 2021	70,200	2,213	72,413
March 2021	101,931	2,343	104,274
April 2021	109,993	2,029	112,022
May 2021	110,717	2,241	112,958
June 2021	103,110	2,358	105,468
July 2021	93,830	2,727	96,557
August 2021	93,117	2,290	95,407
September 2021	100,558	2,115	102,673
October 2021 (FY 2022 start)	92,632	2,710	95,342
November 2021	87,843	3,073	90,526
December 2021	79,220	3,491	82,711
January 2022	76,312	3,335	79,647
February 2022	90,773	3,534	94,307
March 2022	109,372	3,965	113,337
April 2022	98,090	3,912	102,002
May 2022	103,354	4,453	107,807
June 2022	92,785	4,709	97,494
July 2022	72,260	5,249	77,509
August 2022	71,153	6,080	77,233
September 2022	72,494	4,970	77,464
October 2022 (FY 2023 start)	80,097	5,004	85,101
November 2022	69,101	4,339	73,440
December 2022	51,385	4,036	55,421
January 2023	66,538	3,509	70,047
February 2023	76,209	3,920	80,129
March 2023	91,160	3,837	94,997
April 2023	84,203	3,007	87,210
May 2023	31,585	1,154	32,739

== See also ==
- Immigration policy of Donald Trump
- Immigration policy of the Joe Biden administration
