= BCT Commander =

2002 video game

- Developer: ProSIM Company
- Publisher: Shrapnel Games
- Platform: Windows
- Release: WW: February 25, 2002
- Genre: Computer wargame

BCT Commander is a computer wargame developed by ProSIM Company and published by Shrapnel Games. The lead developer was ProSIM Company founder, Pat Proctor. It is a modern combat simulator and includes scenarios ranging from the 1973 October War to near-future scenarios in Cuba.

This game began life was BCT: Brigade Combat Team, published online, independently by ProSIM Company in 1998. It was picked up by Shrapnel Games in 2000 and spawned the follow-on products, BCT Expansion Pack 1 & 2 and BCT Construction Kit. Just before the roll out of ProSIM's second generation engine, Armored Task Force, the game and all of its expansions were repackaged as a single product and, along with a number of upgrades, renamed BCT Commander. The game was also, for the first time, sold as a physical product rather than as a download.

== Reception ==
BCT Commander received mixed reviews from critics. On the review aggregator Metacritic, the game received an average score of 61 out of 100 based on 10 reviews. PC Gamer was initially among the most positive of reviewers, giving it a 93% rating in their November 2001 issue. PC Gamer revisited the title again in their March 2002 issue and reduced their rating to 81%.
