= Path to citizenship =

Proposed U.S. immigration reform

In the United States, a path (or pathway) to citizenship is proposed immigration reform providing a process whereby illegal immigrants can become citizens.

== Obama administration ==
During his 2008 presidential campaign, Barack Obama promised to support a path to citizenship for illegal immigrants, whereby such immigrants, if they were in good standing, could pay a fine in return for gaining the opportunity to become citizens. In 2013, Obama called on Congress to include a path to citizenship in any immigration reform bill it passed. The Border Security, Economic Opportunity, and Immigration Modernization Act of 2013, passed by the United States Senate on June 27, 2013, would create a 13-year path to citizenship for millions of illegal immigrants, a path that would require them to pass several security checks before they can get a green card. The House of Representatives did not act on this bill.

== Trump administration ==
In 2018, president Donald Trump proposed a pathway to citizenship for 1.8 million undocumented immigrants who had arrived as children in exchange for $25 billion in funds to build a border wall. The deal was not successful.

== Biden administration ==
Biden introduced the U.S. Citizenship Act of 2021 on his first day in office. Lobbying for the bill in the United States Senate was led by Sen. Bob Menendez, who indicated gathering the necessary 10 Republican votes to overcome a Senate filibuster would be a 'herculean' challenge.

== Public opinion ==
Multiple polls conducted during Obama's presidency have found that a large majority of Americans support a path to citizenship, but with stronger support among Democrats than among Republicans.

A poll conducted in February 2017 found that 87% of Democrats and 69% of Republicans supported a path to citizenship, as did 72% of President Donald Trump's supporters.

Polling conducted in June 2024 found that 56% of Joe Biden supporters and 15% of Trump supporters supported a pathway to citizenship.

== See also ==
- History of immigration to the United States
- Immigration reform in the United States
