= List of U.S. statewide elected officials =

This is a list of U.S. statewide elected executive officials. These state constitutional officers have their duties and qualifications mandated in state constitutions. This list does not include those elected to serve in non-executive branches of government, such as justices of the state supreme courts or at-large members of the state legislatures. This list also excludes federal legislators, such as the two members of the United States Senate elected from each state or at-large members of the United States House of Representatives. Equivalent officeholders from territories and the federal district are also included.

== Number of offices by type ==
This list is only for the below roles that are elected statewide, and not equivalent roles that are filled by appointment.

- Governor (55/56)
- Lieutenant governor (47/56)
  - In 26 states and four territories, the lieutenant governor is elected on a ticket with the governor, eight of them using separate primaries.
- Secretary of state (35/56)
- Attorney general (46/56)
- Treasurer (36/56)
- Auditor (34/56)
- Superintendent of public instruction (13/56)
- Agriculture commissioner (12/56)
- Insurance commissioner (10/56)
- Land commissioner (5/56)
- Labor commissioner (4/56)
- Mine inspector (1/56)
- Tax commissioner (1/56)

== Alabama ==
Office	Name	Party	Term start	Next election	Term limited	Max term length
Governor	Kay Ivey	Republican	April 10, 2017	2026	Yes	Two consecutive terms
Lieutenant Governor	Will Ainsworth	Republican	January 14, 2019	2026	Yes	Two consecutive terms
Secretary of State	Wes Allen	Republican	January 16, 2023	2026	No (retiring)	Two consecutive terms
Attorney General	Steve Marshall	Republican	February 10, 2017	2026	Yes	Two consecutive terms
Treasurer	Young Boozer	Republican	October 1, 2021	2030	Yes	Two consecutive terms
Auditor	Andrew Sorrell	Republican	January 16, 2023	2030	Yes	Two consecutive terms
Commissioner of Agriculture and Industries	Rick Pate	Republican	January 14, 2019	2026	Yes	Two consecutive terms
Public Service Commissioners (Note: The Alabama Public Service Commission will begin transitioning to elect members from districts coterminous to each of its congressional districts following the 2028 elections. Its three at-large elected members will continue until that transition is completed from the 2032 elections. Four appointed members who will serve in the interim of this expansion's completion are not listed here.)	Cynthia Almond	Republican	June 16, 2025	2028	No	—N/a
Public Service Commissioners	Chris Beeker	Republican	September 23, 2024	2026	No (primaried)	—N/a
Public Service Commissioners	Jeremy Oden	Republican	December 3, 2012	2026	No (primaried)	—N/a
Board of Education District 1	Jackie Zeigler	Republican	January 1, 2017	2028	No	—N/a
Board of Education District 2	Tracie West	Republican	January 1, 2019	2030	No	—N/a
Board of Education District 3	Kelly Mooney	Republican	January 20, 2025	2028	No	—N/a
Board of Education District 4	Yvette Richardson	Democratic	January 17, 2011	2030	No	—N/a
Board of Education District 5	Tonya Smith Chestnut	Democratic	January 18, 2021	2028	No	—N/a
Board of Education District 6	Marie Manning	Republican	January 16, 2023	2026	No (primaried)	—N/a
Board of Education District 7	Allen Long	Republican	January 20, 2025	2028	No	—N/a
Board of Education District 8	Wayne Reynolds	Republican	January 1, 2019	2026	No (retiring)	—N/a

=== Incoming Alabama officials ===
Office	Name	Party	Term start	Next election	Term limited	Max term length
Governor	Tommy Tuberville	Republican	January 18, 2027	2030	No	—N/a
Lieutenant Governor	John Wahl	Republican	January 18, 2027	2030	No	Two consecutive terms
Secretary of State	Caroleene Dobson	Republican	January 18, 2027	2030	No	Two consecutive terms
Attorney General	Katherine Robertson	Republican	January 18, 2027	2030	No	Two consecutive terms
Commissioner of Agriculture and Industries	Corey Hill	Republican	January 18, 2027	2030	No	Two consecutive terms
Public Service Commissioners
Public Service Commissioners	Matt Gentry	Republican	January 18, 2027	2030	No	—N/a
Public Service Commissioners	Jim Zeigler	Republican	January 18, 2027	2030	No	—N/a
Board of Education District 6	Cathi Bradford	Republican	January 18, 2027	2030	No	—N/a
Board of Education District 8	Emily Jones	Republican	January 18, 2027	2030	No	—N/a

== Alaska ==
Office	Name	Party	Term start	Next election	Term limited	Max term length
Governor	Mike Dunleavy	Republican	December 3, 2018	2026	Yes	Two consecutive terms
Lieutenant Governor (Note: In this state, the lieutenant governor is elected on a ticket with the governor, eight of them using separate primaries.)	Nancy Dahlstrom	Republican	December 5, 2022	2026	No (retiring)	Two consecutive terms

=== Incoming Alaska officials ===
Office	Name	Party	Term start	Next election	Term limited	Max term length
Governor	Jonathan Kreiss-Tomkins	Democratic	December 7, 2026	2030	No	Two consecutive terms
Lieutenant Governor	Zac Johnson	Independent	December 7, 2026	2030	No	Two consecutive terms

== Arizona ==
Office	Name	Party	Term start	Next election	Term limited	Max term length
Governor	Katie Hobbs	Democratic	January 2, 2023	2030	Yes	Two consecutive terms
Secretary of State	Adrian Fontes	Democratic	January 2, 2023	2030	Yes	Two consecutive terms
Attorney General	Kris Mayes	Democratic	January 2, 2023	2030	Yes	Two consecutive terms
Treasurer	Kimberly Yee	Republican	January 7, 2019	2026	Yes	Two consecutive terms
Superintendent of Public Instruction	Tom Horne	Republican	January 2, 2023	2026	No (primaried)	Two consecutive terms
Mine Inspector	Les Presmyk	Republican	September 12, 2025	2026	No (defeated)	Four lifetime terms
Corporation Commissioners	Rene Lopez	Republican	January 6, 2025	2028	No	Two consecutive terms
Corporation Commissioners	Lea Márquez Peterson	Republican	May 30, 2019	2028	Yes	Two consecutive terms
Corporation Commissioners	Nick Myers	Republican	January 3, 2023	2026	No (primaried)	Two consecutive terms
Corporation Commissioners	Kevin Thompson	Republican	January 3, 2023	2026	No (defeated)	Two consecutive terms
Corporation Commissioners	Rachel Walden	Republican	January 6, 2025	2028	No	Two consecutive terms

=== Incoming Arizona officials ===
Office	Name	Party	Term start	Next election	Term limited	Max term length
Lieutenant Governor	John Giles	Independent	January 4, 2027	2030	No	—N/a
Treasurer	Nick Mansour	Democratic	January 4, 2027	2030	No	Two consecutive terms
Superintendent of Public Instruction	Teresa Leyba Ruiz	Democratic	January 4, 2027	2030	No	Two consecutive terms
Mine Inspector	Brian Matlock	Democratic	January 4, 2027	2030	No	Four lifetime terms
Corporation Commissioners	Clara Pratte	Democratic	January 4, 2027	2030	No	Two consecutive terms
Corporation Commissioners	Jonathon Hill	Democratic	January 4, 2027	2030	No	Two consecutive terms

== Arkansas ==
Office	Name	Party	Term start	Next election	Term limited	Max term length
Governor	Sarah Huckabee Sanders	Republican	January 10, 2023	2030	Yes	Two lifetime terms
Lieutenant Governor	Leslie Rutledge	Republican	January 10, 2023	2030	Yes	Two lifetime terms
Secretary of State	Cole Jester	Republican	January 1, 2025	2026	Yes (Note: According to Arkansas state law, appointed officials cannot run in the election to complete the term.)	Two lifetime terms
Attorney General	Tim Griffin	Republican	January 10, 2023	2030	Yes	Two lifetime terms
Treasurer	John Thurston	Republican	January 1, 2025	2030	Yes	Two lifetime terms
Auditor	Dennis Milligan	Republican	January 10, 2023	2030	Yes	Two lifetime terms
Commissioner of State Lands	Tommy Land	Republican	January 15, 2019	2026	Yes	Two lifetime terms

=== Incoming Arkansas officials ===
Office	Name	Party	Term start	Next election	Term limited	Max term length
Secretary of State	Kim Hammer	Republican	January 12, 2027	2030	No	Two lifetime terms
Commissioner of State Lands	Cole Jester	Republican	January 12, 2027	2030	No	Two lifetime terms

== California ==
Office	Name	Party	Term start	Next election	Term limited	Max term length
Governor	Gavin Newsom	Democratic	January 7, 2019	2026	Yes	Two lifetime terms
Lieutenant Governor	Eleni Kounalakis	Democratic	January 7, 2019	2026	Yes	Two lifetime terms
Secretary of State	Shirley Weber	Democratic	February 2, 2021	2030	Yes	Two lifetime terms
Attorney General	Rob Bonta	Democratic	April 23, 2021	2030	Yes	Two lifetime terms
Treasurer	Fiona Ma	Democratic	January 7, 2019	2026	Yes	Two lifetime terms
Controller	Malia Cohen	Democratic	January 2, 2023	2030	Yes	Two lifetime terms
Insurance Commissioner	Ricardo Lara	Democratic	January 7, 2019	2026	Yes	Two lifetime terms
Superintendent of Public Instruction (Note: De jure nonpartisan.)	Tony Thurmond	Democratic	January 7, 2019	2026	Yes	Two lifetime terms
Board of Equalization District 1	Ted Gaines	Republican	January 7, 2019	2026	Yes	Two lifetime terms
Board of Equalization District 2	Sally Lieber	Democratic	January 2, 2023	2026	Yes	Two lifetime terms
Board of Equalization District 3	Tony Vazquez	Democratic	January 12, 2019	2026	Yes	Two lifetime terms
Board of Equalization District 4	Mike Schaefer	Democratic	January 7, 2019	2026	Yes	Two lifetime terms

=== Incoming California officials ===
Office	Name	Party	Term start	Next election	Term limited	Max term length
Governor	Xavier Becerra	Democratic	January 4, 2027	2030	No	Two lifetime terms
Lieutenant Governor	Fiona Ma	Democratic	January 4, 2027	2030	No	Two lifetime terms
Treasurer	Eleni Kounalakis	Democratic	January 4, 2027	2030	No	Two lifetime terms
Insurance Commissioner	Jane Kim	Democratic	January 4, 2027	2030	No	Two lifetime terms
Superintendent of Public Instruction	Richard Barrera	Democratic	January 4, 2027	2030	No	Two lifetime terms
Board of Equalization District 1	Nelson Esparza	Democratic	January 4, 2027	2030	No	Two lifetime terms
Board of Equalization District 3	Mike Gipson	Democratic	January 4, 2027	2030	No	Two lifetime terms
Board of Equalization District 4	Tom Umberg	Democratic	January 4, 2027	2030	No	Two lifetime terms

== Colorado ==
Office	Name	Party	Term start	Next election	Term limited	Max term length
Governor	Jared Polis	Democratic	January 8, 2019	2026	Yes	Two consecutive terms
Lieutenant Governor	Dianne Primavera	Democratic	January 8, 2019	2026	Yes	Two consecutive terms
Secretary of State	Jena Griswold	Democratic	January 8, 2019	2026	Yes	Two consecutive terms
Attorney General	Phil Weiser	Democratic	January 8, 2019	2026	Yes	Two consecutive terms
Treasurer	Dave Young	Democratic	January 8, 2019	2026	Yes	Two consecutive terms
Board of Education At-large District	Kathy Plomer	Democratic	January 10, 2023	2028	No	Two consecutive terms
Board of Education District 1	Lisa Escárcega	Democratic	January 12, 2021	2032	Yes	Two consecutive terms
Board of Education District 2	Kathy Gebhardt	Democratic	January 8, 2025	2030	No	Two consecutive terms
Board of Education District 3	Sherri Wright	Republican	October 28, 2024	2032	No	Two consecutive terms
Board of Education District 4	Kristi Burton Brown	Republican	January 8, 2025	2030	No	Two consecutive terms
Board of Education District 5	Steven J. Durham	Republican	December 3, 2014	2028	Yes	Two consecutive terms
Board of Education District 6	Rebecca McClellan	Democratic	January 11, 2017	2028	Yes	Two consecutive terms
Board of Education District 7	Karla Esser	Democratic	January 12, 2021	2032	No	Two consecutive terms
Board of Education District 8	Yazmin Navarro	Republican	January 8, 2025	2030	No	Two consecutive terms
University of Colorado Board of Regents At-large District	Elliot Hood	Democratic	January 7, 2025	2030	No	Two consecutive terms
University of Colorado Board of Regents District 1	Wanda James	Democratic	January 5, 2023	2028	No	Two consecutive terms
University of Colorado Board of Regents District 2	Callie Rennison	Democratic	January 7, 2021	2026	No (retiring)	Two consecutive terms
University of Colorado Board of Regents District 3	Ray Scott	Republican	January 7, 2025	2030	No	Two consecutive terms
University of Colorado Board of Regents District 4	Frank McNulty	Republican	January 5, 2023	2028	No	Two consecutive terms
University of Colorado Board of Regents District 5	Ken Montera	Republican	January 5, 2022	2030	No	Two consecutive terms
University of Colorado Board of Regents District 6	Ilana Spiegel	Democratic	January 7, 2021	2032	No	Two consecutive terms
University of Colorado Board of Regents District 7	Nolbert Chavez	Democratic	January 7, 2021	2032	No	Two consecutive terms
University of Colorado Board of Regents District 8	Mark VanDriel	Republican	January 5, 2023	2028	No	Two consecutive terms

=== Incoming Colorado officials ===
Office	Name	Party	Term start	Next election	Term limited	Max term length
Governor	Phil Weiser	Democratic	January 12, 2027	2030	No	Two consecutive terms
Lieutenant Governor	Lesley Dahlkemper	Democratic	January 12, 2027	2030	No	Two consecutive terms
Secretary of State	Amanda Gonzalez	Democratic	January 12, 2027	2030	No	Two consecutive terms
Attorney General	Jena Griswold	Democratic	January 12, 2027	2030	No	Two consecutive terms
Treasurer	Jeff Bridges	Democratic	January 12, 2027	2030	No	Two consecutive terms
University of Colorado Board of Regents District 2	Edie Hooton	Democratic	January 12, 2027	2032	No	Two consecutive terms

== Connecticut ==
Office	Name	Party	Term start	Next election	Term limited	Max term length
Governor	Ned Lamont	Democratic	January 9, 2019	2030	No	—N/a
Lieutenant Governor	Susan Bysiewicz	Democratic	January 9, 2019	2030	No	—N/a
Secretary of State	Stephanie Thomas	Democratic	January 4, 2023	2030	No	—N/a
Attorney General	William Tong	Democratic	January 9, 2019	2030	No	—N/a
Treasurer	Erick Russell	Democratic	January 4, 2023	2030	No	—N/a
Comptroller	Sean Scanlon	Democratic	January 4, 2023	2030	No	—N/a

== Delaware ==
Office	Name	Party	Term start	Next election	Term limited	Max term length
Governor	Matt Meyer	Democratic	January 21, 2025	2028	No	Two lifetime terms
Lieutenant Governor	Kyle Evans Gay	Democratic	January 21, 2025	2028	No	Two lifetime terms
Attorney General	Kathy Jennings	Democratic	January 1, 2019	2030	No	—N/a
Treasurer	Colleen Davis	Democratic	January 1, 2019	2026	No (retiring)	—N/a
Auditor of Accounts	Lydia York	Democratic	January 3, 2023	2030	No	—N/a
Commissioner of Insurance	Trinidad Navarro	Democratic	January 17, 2017	2028	No	—N/a

=== Incoming Delaware officials ===
Office	Name	Party	Term start	Next election	Term limited	Max term length
Treasurer	Ted Lauzen	Democratic	January 5, 2027	2030	No	—N/a

== Florida ==
Office	Name	Party	Term start	Next election	Term limited	Max term length
Governor	Ron DeSantis	Republican	January 8, 2019	2026	Yes	Two consecutive terms
Lieutenant Governor	Jay Collins	Republican	August 12, 2025	2026	No (retiring)	Two consecutive terms
Attorney General	James Uthmeier	Republican	February 17, 2025	2030	Yes	Two consecutive terms
Chief Financial Officer	Blaise Ingoglia	Republican	July 21, 2025	2030	Yes	Two consecutive terms
Commissioner of Agriculture and Consumer Services	Wilton Simpson	Republican	January 3, 2023	2030	Yes	Two consecutive terms

=== Incoming Florida officials ===
Office	Name	Party	Term start	Next election	Term limited	Max term length
Governor	Byron Donalds	Republican	January 5, 2027	2030	No	Two consecutive terms
Lieutenant Governor	Bryan Avila	Republican	January 5, 2027	2030	No	Two consecutive terms

== Georgia ==
Office	Name	Party	Term start	Next election	Term limited	Max term length
Governor	Brian Kemp	Republican	January 14, 2019	2026	Yes	Two consecutive terms
Lieutenant Governor	Burt Jones	Republican	January 9, 2023	2026	No (retiring)	—N/a
Secretary of State	Brad Raffensperger	Republican	January 14, 2019	2026	No (retiring)	—N/a
Attorney General	Chris Carr	Republican	November 1, 2016	2026	No (retiring)	—N/a
Commissioner of Agriculture	Tyler Harper	Republican	January 12, 2023	2026	No (defeated)	—N/a
Insurance and Safety Fire Commissioner	John King	Republican	July 1, 2019	2026	No (defeated)	—N/a
Commissioner of Labor	Bárbara Rivera Holmes	Republican	April 4, 2025	2026	No (defeated)	—N/a
Superintendent of Schools	Richard Woods	Republican	January 12, 2015	2026	No (defeated)	—N/a
Public Service Commissioners	Peter Hubbard	Democratic	January 11, 2026	2032	No	—N/a
Public Service Commissioners	Alicia Johnson	Democratic	January 11, 2026	2030	No	—N/a
Public Service Commissioners	Bubba McDonald	Republican	January 1, 2009	2028	No	—N/a
Public Service Commissioners	Jason Shaw	Republican	January 3, 2019	2028	No	—N/a
Public Service Commissioners	Stan Wise	Republican	September 4, 2026	2026	No (retiring)	—N/a

=== Incoming Georgia officials ===
Office	Name	Party	Term start	Next election	Term limited	Max term length
Governor	Keisha Lance Bottoms	Democratic	January 11, 2027	2030	No	Two consecutive terms
Lieutenant Governor	Josh McLaurin	Democratic	January 11, 2027	2030	No	—N/a
Secretary of State	Penny Brown Reynolds	Democratic	January 11, 2027	2030	No	—N/a
Attorney General	Tanya Miller	Democratic	January 11, 2027	2030	No	—N/a
Commissioner of Agriculture	Katherine Juhan-Arnold	Democratic	January 11, 2027	2030	No	—N/a
Insurance and Safety Fire Commissioner	Keisha Waites	Democratic	January 11, 2027	2030	No	—N/a
Commissioner of Labor	Nikki Porcher	Democratic	January 11, 2027	2030	No	—N/a
Superintendent of Schools	Lydia Powell	Democratic	January 11, 2027	2030	No	—N/a
Public Service Commissioners	Shelia Edwards	Democratic	January 11, 2027	2032	No	—N/a

== Hawaii ==
Office	Name	Party	Term start	Next election	Term limited	Max term length
Governor	Josh Green	Democratic	December 5, 2022	2026	No	Two consecutive terms
Lieutenant Governor	Sylvia Luke; On leave	Democratic	December 5, 2022	2026	No (retiring)	Two consecutive terms
Lieutenant Governor	Keith Regan; Acting	Democratic	April 23, 2026	2026	No (retiring)	Two consecutive terms
Office of Hawaiian Affairs Board of Trustees At-large
Office of Hawaiian Affairs Board of Trustees At-large	Keli‘i Akina	Republican	December 8, 2016	2028	No	—N/a
Office of Hawaiian Affairs Board of Trustees At-large	Brickwood Galuteria	Democratic	December 8, 2022	2030	No	—N/a
Office of Hawaiian Affairs Board of Trustees At-large	Keoni Souza	Republican	December 8, 2022	2030	No	—N/a
Office of Hawaiian Affairs Board of Trustees At-large	John Waihee IV	Democratic	December 2000	2026	No (defeated)	—N/a
Office of Hawaiian Affairs Board of Trustees Hawaii Island District	Kai Kahele	Democratic	December 5, 2024	2028	No	—N/a
Office of Hawaiian Affairs Board of Trustees Kauaʻi & Niʻihau District	Dan Ahuna	Independent	December 12, 2012	2028	No	—N/a
Office of Hawaiian Affairs Board of Trustees Maui District	Carmen Hulu Lindsey	Independent	January 17, 2012	2030	No	—N/a
Office of Hawaiian Affairs Board of Trustees Molokaʻi & Lānaʻi District	Luana Alapa	Independent	December 10, 2020	2028	No	—N/a
Office of Hawaiian Affairs Board of Trustees Oʻahu District	Kalei Akaka	Democratic	December 10, 2018	2030	No	—N/a

=== Incoming Hawaii officials ===
Office	Name	Party	Term start	Next election	Term limited	Max term length
Lieutenant Governor	Derek Kawakami	Democratic	December 7, 2026	2030	No	Two consecutive terms
Office of Hawaiian Affairs Board of Trustees At-large	Ikaika Anderson	Democratic	December 7, 2026	2030	No	—N/a

== Idaho ==
Office	Name	Party	Term start	Next election	Term limited	Max term length
Governor	Brad Little	Republican	January 6, 2019	2030	No	—N/a
Lieutenant Governor	Scott Bedke	Republican	January 2, 2023	2030	No	—N/a
Secretary of State	Phil McGrane	Republican	January 2, 2023	2030	No	—N/a
Attorney General	Raúl Labrador	Republican	January 2, 2023	2030	No	—N/a
Treasurer	Julie Ellsworth	Republican	January 6, 2019	2030	No	—N/a
Controller	Brandon Woolf	Republican	October 15, 2012	2030	No	—N/a
Superintendent of Public Instruction	Debbie Critchfield	Republican	January 2, 2023	2030	No	—N/a

== Illinois ==
Office	Name	Party	Term start	Next election	Term limited	Max term length
Governor	J. B. Pritzker	Democratic	January 14, 2019	2026	No	—N/a
Lieutenant Governor	Juliana Stratton	Democratic	January 14, 2019	2026	No (retiring)	—N/a
Attorney General	Kwame Raoul	Democratic	January 14, 2019	2030	No	—N/a
Secretary of State	Alexi Giannoulias	Democratic	January 9, 2023	2030	No	—N/a
Comptroller	Susana Mendoza	Democratic	December 5, 2016	2026	No (retiring)	—N/a
Treasurer	Mike Frerichs	Democratic	January 12, 2015	2030	No	—N/a

=== Incoming Illinois officials ===
Office	Name	Party	Term start	Next election	Term limited	Max term length
Lieutenant Governor	Christian Mitchell	Democratic	January 11, 2027	2030	No	—N/a
Comptroller	Margaret Croke	Democratic	January 11, 2027	2030	No	—N/a

== Indiana ==
Office	Name	Party	Term start	Next election	Term limited	Max term length
Governor	Mike Braun	Republican	January 13, 2025	2028	No	Eight out of twelve years
Lieutenant Governor	Micah Beckwith	Republican	January 13, 2025	2028	No	Eight out of twelve years
Secretary of State	Diego Morales	Republican	January 1, 2023	2026	No (primaried)	Eight out of twelve years
Attorney General	Todd Rokita	Republican	January 11, 2021	2028	Yes	Eight out of twelve years
Treasurer	Daniel Elliott	Republican	January 9, 2023	2030	Yes	Eight out of twelve years
Auditor	Elise Nieshalla	Republican	December 1, 2023	2026	No (defeated)	Eight out of twelve years

=== Incoming Indiana officials ===
Office	Name	Party	Term start	Next election	Term limited	Max term length
Secretary of State	Beau Bayh	Democratic	January 1, 2027	2030	No	Eight out of twelve years
Auditor	Jessica Bailey	Democratic	January 1, 2027	2030	No	Eight out of twelve years

== Iowa ==
Office	Name	Party	Term start	Next election	Term limited	Max term length
Governor	Kim Reynolds	Republican	May 24, 2017	2026	No (retiring)	—N/a
Lieutenant Governor	Chris Cournoyer	Republican	December 16, 2024	2026	No (retiring)	—N/a
Secretary of State	Paul Pate	Republican	January 1, 2015	2030	No	—N/a
Attorney General	Brenna Bird	Republican	January 3, 2023	2026	No (defeated)	—N/a
Treasurer	Roby Smith	Republican	January 1, 2023	2030	No	—N/a
Auditor	Rob Sand	Democratic	January 2, 2019	2026	No (retiring)	—N/a
Secretary of Agriculture and Land Stewardship	Mike Naig	Republican	March 5, 2018	2030	No	—N/a

=== Incoming Iowa officials ===
Office	Name	Party	Term start	Next election	Term limited	Max term length
Governor	Rob Sand	Democratic	January 12, 2027	2030	No	—N/a
Lieutenant Governor	Dave Muhlbauer	Democratic	January 12, 2027	2030	No	—N/a
Attorney General	Nathan Willems	Democratic	January 12, 2027	2030	No	—N/a
Auditor	Taylor Wettach	Democratic	January 12, 2027	2030	No	—N/a

== Kansas ==
Office	Name	Party	Term start	Next election	Term limited	Max term length
Governor	Laura Kelly	Democratic	January 14, 2019	2026	Yes	Two consecutive terms
Lieutenant Governor	David Toland	Democratic	January 2, 2021	2026	No (retiring)	Two consecutive terms
Secretary of State	Scott Schwab	Republican	January 14, 2019	2026	No (retiring)	—N/a
Attorney General	Kris Kobach	Republican	January 9, 2023	2026	No (defeated)	—N/a
Treasurer	Steven Johnson	Republican	January 9, 2023	2030	No	—N/a
Insurance Commissioner	Vicki Schmidt	Republican	January 14, 2019	2026	No (retiring)	—N/a
Board of Education District 1	Danny Zeck	Republican	January 3, 2023	2026	No (retiring)	—N/a
Board of Education District 2	Melanie Haas	Democratic	January 12, 2021	2028	No	—N/a
Board of Education District 3	Michelle Dombrosky	Republican	January 1, 2019	2026	No (retiring)	—N/a
Board of Education District 4	Connie O'Brien	Republican	January 13, 2025	2028	No	—N/a
Board of Education District 5	Cathy Hopkins	Republican	January 3, 2023	2026	No (retiring)	—N/a
Board of Education District 6	Beryl New	Democratic	January 13, 2025	2028	No	—N/a
Board of Education District 7	Dennis Hershberger	Republican	January 3, 2023	2026	No (retiring)	—N/a
Board of Education District 8	Betty Arnold	Democratic	January 12, 2021	2028	No	—N/a
Board of Education District 9	Jim Porter	Republican	January 2, 2015	2026	No (retiring)	—N/a
Board of Education District 10	Debby Potter	Republican	January 13, 2025	2028	No	—N/a

=== Incoming Kansas officials ===
Office	Name	Party	Term start	Next election	Term limited	Max term length
Governor	Cindy Holscher	Democratic	January 11, 2027	2030	No	Two consecutive terms
Lieutenant Governor	KC Ohaebosim	Democratic	January 11, 2027	2030	No	Two consecutive terms
Secretary of State	Pat Proctor	Republican	January 11, 2027	2030	No	—N/a
Attorney General	Chris Mann	Democratic	January 11, 2027	2030	No	—N/a
Insurance Commissioner	Daniel Hawkins	Republican	January 11, 2027	2030	No	—N/a
Board of Education District 1	Amy Cawvey	Republican	January 11, 2027	2030	No	—N/a
Board of Education District 3	Amy Diediker	Democratic	January 11, 2027	2030	No	—N/a
Board of Education District 5	Jean Clifford	Republican	January 11, 2027	2030	No	—N/a
Board of Education District 7	Alana McWilliams	Republican	January 11, 2027	2030	No	—N/a
Board of Education District 9	Destry Brown	Republican	January 11, 2027	2030	No	—N/a

== Kentucky ==
Office	Name	Party	Term start	Next election	Term limited	Max term length
Governor	Andy Beshear	Democratic	December 10, 2019	2027	Yes	Two consecutive terms
Lieutenant Governor	Jacqueline Coleman	Democratic	December 10, 2019	2027	Yes	Two consecutive terms
Secretary of State	Michael Adams	Republican	January 6, 2020	2027	Yes	Two consecutive terms
Attorney General	Russell Coleman	Republican	January 1, 2024	2027	No	Two consecutive terms
Auditor of Public Accounts	Allison Ball	Republican	January 1, 2024	2027	No	Two consecutive terms
State Treasurer	Mark Metcalf	Republican	January 1, 2024	2027	No	Two consecutive terms
Commissioner of Agriculture	Jonathan Shell	Republican	January 1, 2024	2027	No	Two consecutive terms

== Louisiana ==
Office	Name	Party	Term start	Next election	Term limited	Max term length
Governor	Jeff Landry	Republican	January 8, 2024	2027	No	Two lifetime terms
Lieutenant Governor	Billy Nungesser	Republican	January 11, 2016	2027	No	—N/a
Secretary of State	Nancy Landry	Republican	January 8, 2024	2027	No	—N/a
Attorney General	Liz Murrill	Republican	January 8, 2024	2027	No	—N/a
Treasurer	John Fleming	Republican	January 8, 2024	2027	No	—N/a
Commissioner of Insurance	Tim Temple	Republican	January 8, 2024	2027	No	—N/a
Commissioner of Agriculture and Forestry	Mike Strain	Republican	January 14, 2008	2027	No	—N/a
Public Service Commissioner District 1	Eric Skrmetta	Republican	January 1, 2009	2026	Yes	Two and a half consecutive terms
Public Service Commissioner District 2	Jean-Paul Coussan	Republican	January 1, 2025	2030	No	Two and a half consecutive terms
Public Service Commissioner District 3	Davante Lewis	Democratic	December 31, 2022	2028	No	Two and a half consecutive terms
Public Service Commissioner District 4	Mike Francis	Republican	January 3, 2017	2028	No	Two and a half consecutive terms
Public Service Commissioner District 5	Foster Campbell	Democratic	January 1, 2003	2026	Yes	Two and a half consecutive terms
Board of Elementary and Secondary Education District 1 (Note: Louisiana's Board of Elementary and Secondary Education elects eight of its members, and the governor appoints an additional three members. The appointed members are not listed here.)	Joseph Cao	Republican	January 14, 2026	2027	No	Two and a half consecutive terms
Board of Elementary and Secondary Education District 2	Sharon Latten Clark	Democratic	January 8, 2024	2027	No	Two and a half consecutive terms
Board of Elementary and Secondary Education District 3	Sandy Holloway	Republican	January 11, 2016	2027	Yes	Two and a half consecutive terms
Board of Elementary and Secondary Education District 4	Stacey Melerine	Republican	January 8, 2024	2027	No	Two and a half consecutive terms
Board of Elementary and Secondary Education District 5	Lance Harris	Republican	January 8, 2024	2027	No	Two and a half consecutive terms
Board of Elementary and Secondary Education District 6	Ronnie Morris	Republican	January 13, 2020	2027	No	Two and a half consecutive terms
Board of Elementary and Secondary Education District 7	Kevin Berken	Republican	January 8, 2024	2027	No	Two and a half consecutive terms
Board of Elementary and Secondary Education District 8	Preston Castille	Democratic	January 13, 2020	2027	No	Two and a half consecutive terms

=== Incoming Louisiana officials ===
Office	Name	Party	Term start	Next election	Term limited	Max term length
Public Service Commissioner District 1	Stephanie Hilferty	Republican	January 1, 2027	2032	No	Two and a half consecutive terms
Public Service Commissioner District 5	John Atkins	Republican	January 1, 2027	2032	No	Two and a half consecutive terms

== Maine ==
Office	Name	Party	Term start	Next election	Term limited	Max term length
Governor	Janet Mills	Democratic	January 2, 2019	2026	Yes	Two consecutive terms

=== Incoming Maine officials ===
Office	Name	Party	Term start	Next election	Term limited	Max term length
Governor	Hannah Pingree	Democratic	January 6, 2027	2030	No	Two consecutive terms

== Maryland ==
Office	Name	Party	Term start	Next election	Term limited	Max term length
Governor	Wes Moore	Democratic	January 18, 2023	2030	Yes	Two consecutive terms
Lieutenant Governor	Aruna Miller	Democratic	January 18, 2023	2030	No	—N/a
Attorney General	Anthony Brown	Democratic	January 3, 2023	2030	No	—N/a
Comptroller	Brooke Lierman	Democratic	January 16, 2023	2030	No	—N/a

== Massachusetts ==
Office	Name	Party	Term start	Next election	Term limited	Max term length
Governor	Maura Healey	Democratic	January 5, 2023	2030	No	—N/a
Lieutenant Governor	Kim Driscoll	Democratic	January 5, 2023	2030	No	—N/a
Secretary of the Commonwealth	William F. Galvin	Democratic	January 1, 1995	2030	No	—N/a
Attorney General	Andrea Campbell	Democratic	January 18, 2023	2030	No	—N/a
Treasurer and Receiver-General	Deb Goldberg	Democratic	January 21, 2015	2030	No	—N/a
Auditor	Diana DiZoglio	Democratic	January 18, 2023	2030	No	—N/a
Governor's Councilor District 1	Joseph Ferreira	Democratic	January 8, 2015	2028	No	—N/a
Governor's Councilor District 2	Tamisha Civil	Democratic	January 2, 2025	2028	No	—N/a
Governor's Councilor District 3	Mara Dolan	Democratic	January 2, 2025	2028	No	—N/a
Governor's Councilor District 4	Christopher Iannella Jr.	Democratic	January 7, 1993	2028	No	—N/a
Governor's Councilor District 5	Eunice Zeigler	Democratic	January 2, 2025	2028	No	—N/a
Governor's Councilor District 6	Terrence W. Kennedy	Democratic	January 6, 2011	2028	No	—N/a
Governor's Councilor District 7	Paul DePalo	Democratic	January 7, 2021	2028	No	—N/a
Governor's Councilor District 8	Tara Jacobs	Democratic	January 5, 2023	2028	No	—N/a

== Michigan ==
Office	Name	Party	Term start	Next election	Term limited	Max term length
Governor	Gretchen Whitmer	Democratic	January 1, 2019	2026	Yes	Two lifetime terms
Lieutenant Governor	Garlin Gilchrist	Democratic	January 1, 2019	2026	Yes	Two lifetime terms
Secretary of State	Jocelyn Benson	Democratic	January 1, 2019	2026	Yes	Two lifetime terms
Attorney General	Dana Nessel	Democratic	January 1, 2019	2026	Yes	Two lifetime terms
Board of Education	Marshall Bullock	Democratic	December 22, 2022	2028	No	—N/a
Board of Education	Ellen Lipton	Democratic	January 1, 2021	2028	No	—N/a
Board of Education	Tom McMillin	Republican	January 1, 2017	2032	No	—N/a
Board of Education	Judith Pritchett	Democratic	January 1, 2019	2034	No	—N/a
Board of Education	Pamela Pugh	Democratic	January 1, 2015	2030	No	—N/a
Board of Education	Mitchell Robinson	Democratic	January 1, 2023	2030	No	—N/a
Board of Education	Nikki Snyder	Republican	January 1, 2017	2032	No	—N/a
Board of Education	Tiffany Tilley	Democratic	January 1, 2019	2034	No	—N/a
Michigan State University Board of Trustees	Rebecca Bahar-Cook	Democratic	January 1, 2025	2032	No	—N/a
Michigan State University Board of Trustees	Mike Balow	Republican	January 1, 2025	2032	No	—N/a
Michigan State University Board of Trustees	Kelly Tebay	Democratic	January 1, 2019	2034	No	—N/a
Michigan State University Board of Trustees	Dennis Denno	Democratic	January 1, 2023	2030	No	—N/a
Michigan State University Board of Trustees	Renee Knake Jefferson	Democratic	December 4, 2019	2030	No	—N/a
Michigan State University Board of Trustees	Sandy Pierce	Democratic	December 27, 2022	2028	No	—N/a
Michigan State University Board of Trustees	Brianna Scott	Democratic	January 1, 2019	2034	No	—N/a
Michigan State University Board of Trustees	Rema Vassar	Democratic	January 1, 2021	2028	No	—N/a
University of Michigan Board of Regents	Jordan Acker	Democratic	January 1, 2019	2026	No (primaried)	—N/a
University of Michigan Board of Regents	Michael Behm	Democratic	January 1, 2015	2030	No	—N/a
University of Michigan Board of Regents	Mark Bernstein	Democratic	January 1, 2013	2028	No	—N/a
University of Michigan Board of Regents	Paul Brown	Democratic	January 1, 2019	2034	No	—N/a
University of Michigan Board of Regents	Sarah Hubbard	Republican	January 1, 2021	2028	No	—N/a
University of Michigan Board of Regents	Denise Ilitch	Democratic	January 1, 2009	2032	No	—N/a
University of Michigan Board of Regents	Carl Meyers	Republican	January 1, 2025	2032	No	—N/a
University of Michigan Board of Regents	Katherine White	Democratic	January 1, 1999	2030	No	—N/a
Wayne State University Board of Governors	Danielle Atkinson	Democratic	January 1, 2023	2030	No	—N/a
Wayne State University Board of Governors	Bryan Barnhill	Democratic	January 1, 2019	2026	No (retiring)	—N/a
Wayne State University Board of Governors	Michael Busuito	Democratic	January 1, 2017	2032	No	—N/a
Wayne State University Board of Governors	Marilyn Kelly	Democratic	January 1, 2015	2030	No	—N/a
Wayne State University Board of Governors	Anil Kumar	Democratic	January 1, 2019	2026	No (retiring)	—N/a
Wayne State University Board of Governors	Terri Lynn Land	Republican	January 1, 2021	2028	No	—N/a
Wayne State University Board of Governors	Sunny Reddy	Republican	January 1, 2025	2032	No	—N/a
Wayne State University Board of Governors	Shirley Stancato	Democratic	December 12, 2019	2028	No	—N/a

=== Incoming Michigan officials ===
Office	Name	Party	Term start	Next election	Term limited	Max term length
Governor	Jocelyn Benson	Democratic	January 1, 2027	2030	No	Two lifetime terms
Lieutenant Governor	Winnie Brinks	Democratic	January 1, 2027	2030	No	Two lifetime terms
Secretary of State	Garlin Gilchrist	Democratic	January 1, 2027	2030	No	Two lifetime terms
Attorney General	Eli Savit	Democratic	January 1, 2027	2030	No	Two lifetime terms
University of Michigan Board of Regents	Amir Makled	Democratic	January 1, 2027	2034	No	—N/a
Wayne State University Board of Governors	Shereef Akeel	Democratic	January 1, 2027	2034	No	—N/a
Wayne State University Board of Governors	Richard Mack	Democratic	January 1, 2027	2034	No	—N/a

== Minnesota ==
Office	Name	Party	Term start	Next election	Term limited	Max term length
Governor	Tim Walz	Democratic–Farmer–Labor	January 7, 2019	2026	No (retiring)	—N/a
Lieutenant Governor	Peggy Flanagan	Democratic–Farmer–Labor	January 7, 2019	2026	No (retiring)	—N/a
Secretary of State	Steve Simon	Democratic–Farmer–Labor	January 5, 2015	2030	No	—N/a
Attorney General	Keith Ellison	Democratic–Farmer–Labor	January 7, 2019	2030	No	—N/a
Auditor	Julie Blaha	Democratic–Farmer–Labor	January 7, 2019	2026	No (retiring)	—N/a

=== Incoming Minnesota officials ===
Office	Name	Party	Term start	Next election	Term limited	Max term length
Governor	Amy Klobuchar	Democratic–Farmer–Labor	January 4, 2027	2030	No	—N/a
Lieutenant Governor	Ben Schierer	Democratic–Farmer–Labor	January 4, 2027	2030	No	—N/a
Auditor	Zack Filipovich	Democratic–Farmer–Labor	January 4, 2027	2030	No	—N/a

== Mississippi ==
Office	Name	Party	Term start	Next election	Term limited	Max term length
Governor	Tate Reeves	Republican	January 14, 2020	2027	Yes	Two lifetime terms
Lieutenant Governor	Delbert Hosemann	Republican	January 14, 2020	2027	Yes	Two consecutive terms
Secretary of State	Michael Watson	Republican	January 14, 2020	2027	No (retiring)	—N/a
Attorney General	Lynn Fitch	Republican	January 14, 2020	2027	No (retiring)	—N/a
Treasurer	David McRae	Republican	January 14, 2020	2027	No	—N/a
Auditor	Shad White	Republican	July 16, 2018	2027	No (retiring)	—N/a
Commissioner of Insurance and Fire Marshal	Mike Chaney	Republican	January 10, 2008	2027	No	—N/a
Commissioner of Agriculture and Commerce	Andy Gipson	Republican	April 2, 2018	2027	No (retiring)	—N/a
Public Service Commissioner Northern District	Chris Brown	Republican	January 4, 2024	2027	No	—N/a
Public Service Commissioner Central District	De'Keither Stamps	Democratic	January 4, 2024	2027	No	—N/a
Public Service Commissioner Southern District	Nelson Wayne Carr	Republican	January 4, 2024	2027	No	—N/a
Transportation Commissioner Northern District	John Caldwell	Republican	January 7, 2020	2027	No (retiring)	—N/a
Transportation Commissioner Central District	Willie Lee Simmons	Democratic	January 7, 2020	2027	No	—N/a
Transportation Commissioner Southern District	Charles Busby	Republican	January 4, 2024	2027	No	—N/a

== Missouri ==
Office	Name	Party	Term start	Next election	Term limited	Max term length
Governor	Mike Kehoe	Republican	January 13, 2025	2028	No	Two lifetime terms
Lieutenant Governor	David Wasinger	Republican	January 13, 2025	2028	No	—N/a
Secretary of State	Denny Hoskins	Republican	January 13, 2025	2028	No	—N/a
Attorney General	Catherine Hanaway	Republican	September 8, 2025	2028	No	—N/a
Treasurer	Vivek Malek	Republican	January 17, 2023	2028	No	Two lifetime terms
Auditor	Scott Fitzpatrick	Republican	January 9, 2023	2030	No	—N/a

== Montana ==
Office	Name	Party	Term start	Next election	Term limited	Max term length
Governor	Greg Gianforte	Republican	January 4, 2021	2028	Yes	Eight out of sixteen years
Lieutenant Governor	Kristen Juras	Republican	January 4, 2021	2028	Yes	Eight out of sixteen years
Secretary of State	Christi Jacobsen	Republican	January 4, 2021	2028	Yes	Eight out of sixteen years
Attorney General	Austin Knudsen	Republican	January 4, 2021	2028	Yes	Eight out of sixteen years
Auditor	James Brown	Republican	January 6, 2025	2028	No	Eight out of sixteen years
Superintendent of Public Instruction	Susie Hedalen	Republican	January 6, 2025	2028	No	Eight out of sixteen years
Public Service Commissioner District 1	Randy Pinocci	Republican	January 1, 2019	2026	Yes	Eight out of sixteen years
Public Service Commissioner District 2	Brad Molnar suspended	Republican	January 6, 2025	2028	No	Eight out of sixteen years
Public Service Commissioner District 2	Kirk Bushman acting	Republican	August 31, 2026	2028	No	Eight out of sixteen years
Public Service Commissioner District 3	Jeffrey Welborn	Republican	January 6, 2025	2028	No	Eight out of sixteen years
Public Service Commissioner District 4	Jennifer Fielder	Republican	January 4, 2021	2028	Yes	Eight out of sixteen years
Public Service Commissioner District 5	Annie Bukace	Republican	January 2, 2023	2030	Yes	Eight out of sixteen years

=== Incoming Montana officials ===
Office	Name	Party	Term start	Next election	Term limited	Max term length
Public Service Commissioner District 1	Jeff Pattison	Republican	January 4, 2027	2030	No	Eight out of sixteen years

== Nebraska ==
Office	Name	Party	Term start	Next election	Term limited	Max term length
Governor	Jim Pillen	Republican	January 5, 2023	2030	Yes	Two consecutive terms
Lieutenant Governor	Joe Kelly	Republican	January 5, 2023	2030	No	—N/a
Secretary of State	Bob Evnen	Republican	January 10, 2019	2026	No (primaried)	—N/a
Attorney General	Mike Hilgers	Republican	January 5, 2023	2030	No	—N/a
Treasurer	Joey Spellerberg	Republican	November 6, 2025	2030	No	Two consecutive terms
Auditor of Public Accounts	Mike Foley	Republican	January 5, 2023	2030	No	—N/a
Public Service Commissioner District 1	Dan Watermeier	Republican	January 9, 2019	2030	No	—N/a
Public Service Commissioner District 2	Christian Mirch	Republican	January 27, 2023	2026	No (retiring)	—N/a
Public Service Commissioner District 3	Tim Schram	Republican	January 7, 2007	2030	No	—N/a
Public Service Commissioner District 4	Eric Kamler	Republican	January 5, 2023	2028	No	—N/a
Public Service Commissioner District 5	Kevin Stocker	Republican	January 5, 2023	2028	No	—N/a
Board of Education District 1	Kristin Christensen	Democratic	January 9, 2025	2028	No	—N/a
Board of Education District 2	Maggie Douglas	Democratic	January 9, 2025	2028	No	—N/a
Board of Education District 3	Lisa Schonhoff	Republican	January 9, 2025	2028	No	—N/a
Board of Education District 4	Liz Renner	Democratic	January 9, 2025	2028	No	—N/a
Board of Education District 5	Kirk Penner	Republican	December 23, 2021	2026	No (retiring)	—N/a
Board of Education District 6	Sherry Jones	Republican	January 5, 2023	2030	No	—N/a
Board of Education District 7	Elizabeth Tegtmeier	Republican	January 5, 2023	2030	No	—N/a
Board of Education District 8	Deborah Neary	Democratic	January 1, 2019	2026	No (retiring)	—N/a
University of Nebraska Board of Regents District 1	Tim Clare	Republican	January 7, 2009	2026	No (retiring)	—N/a
University of Nebraska Board of Regents District 2	Jack Stark	Republican	January 7, 2021	2026	No (retiring)	—N/a
University of Nebraska Board of Regents District 3	Jim Scheer	Republican	February 3, 2023	2030	No	—N/a
University of Nebraska Board of Regents District 4	Joel Makovicka	Republican	February 3, 2026	2026 (special)	No (retiring)	—N/a
University of Nebraska Board of Regents District 5	Robert Schafer	Republican	March 26, 2013	2030	No	—N/a
University of Nebraska Board of Regents District 6	Paul Kenney	Republican	January 4, 2017	2028	No	—N/a
University of Nebraska Board of Regents District 7	Kathy Wilmo	Republican	January 5, 2023	2028	No	—N/a
University of Nebraska Board of Regents District 8	Barbara Weitz	Democratic	January 10, 2019	2030	No	—N/a

=== Incoming Nebraska officials ===
Office	Name	Party	Term start	Next election	Term limited	Max term length
Secretary of State	Scott Petersen	Republican	January 7, 2027	2030	No	—N/a
Public Service Commissioner District 2	Wendy DeBoer	Democratic	January 7, 2027	2032	No	—N/a
Board of Education District 5	Angie Eberspacher	Republican	January 7, 2027	2030	No	—N/a
Board of Education District 8	Lou Ann Goding	Republican	January 7, 2027	2030	No	—N/a
University of Nebraska Board of Regents District 1	Brent Comstock	Democratic	January 7, 2027	2032	No	—N/a
University of Nebraska Board of Regents District 2	Elizabeth Butler	Democratic	January 7, 2027	2032	No	—N/a
University of Nebraska Board of Regents District 4	Justin Solomon	Democratic	January 7, 2027	2032	No	—N/a

== Nevada ==
Office	Name	Party	Term start	Next election	Term limited	Max term length
Governor	Joe Lombardo	Republican	January 2, 2023	2026	No (defeated)	Two lifetime terms
Lieutenant Governor	Stavros Anthony	Republican	January 2, 2023	2026	No (defeated)	Two lifetime terms
Secretary of State	Cisco Aguilar	Democratic	January 2, 2023	2030	Yes	Two lifetime terms
Attorney General	Aaron Ford	Democratic	January 7, 2019	2026	Yes	Two lifetime terms
Treasurer	Zach Conine	Democratic	January 7, 2019	2026	Yes	Two lifetime terms
Controller	Andy Matthews	Republican	January 2, 2023	2026	No (defeated)	Two lifetime terms
Board of Regents District 1	Carlos Fernandez	Democratic	January 16, 2025	2028	No	Twelve years
Board of Regents District 2	Jennifer McGrath	Republican	March 1, 2025	2030	No	Twelve years
Board of Regents District 3	Byron Brooks	Republican	January 15, 2021	2030	No	Twelve years
Board of Regents District 4	Aaron Bautista	Democratic	January 16, 2025	2028	No	Twelve years
Board of Regents District 5	Patrick Boylan	Democratic	January 15, 2021	2026	No (primaried)	Twelve years
Board of Regents District 6	Heather Brown	Democratic	January 13, 2023	2028	No	Twelve years
Board of Regents District 7	Susan Brager	Democratic	January 13, 2023	2028	No	Twelve years
Board of Regents District 8	Pete Goicoechea	Republican	December 4, 2024	2028	No	Twelve years
Board of Regents District 9	Carol Del Carlo	Republican	January 1, 2017	2028	Yes	Twelve years
Board of Regents District 10	Joseph Arrascada	Democratic	January 15, 2021	2030	No	Twelve years
Board of Regents District 11	Jeff Downs	Republican	January 13, 2023	2028	No	Twelve years
Board of Regents District 12	Amy Carvalho	Democratic	January 18, 2019	2028	No	Twelve years
Board of Regents District 13	Stephanie Goodman	Republican	January 13, 2023	2028	No	Twelve years
Board of Education District 1 (Note: Nevada's Board of Education elects four of its members, and there are an additional seven appointed members. The appointed members are not listed here.)	Tricia Braxton	Democratic	January 1, 2025	2028	No	Three lifetime terms
Board of Education District 2	Stephanie Goodman	Republican	November 1, 2023	2028	No	Three lifetime terms
Board of Education District 3	Danielle Ford	Democratic	January 1, 2025	2028	No	Three lifetime terms
Board of Education District 4	Tim Hughes	Democratic	January 1, 2025	2028	No	Three lifetime terms

=== Incoming Nevada officials ===
Office	Name	Party	Term start	Next election	Term limited	Max term length
Governor	Aaron Ford	Democratic	January 4, 2027	2030	No	Two lifetime terms
Lieutenant Governor	Sandra Jauregui	Democratic	January 4, 2027	2030	No	Two lifetime terms
Attorney General	Nicole Cannizzaro	Democratic	January 4, 2027	2030	No	Two lifetime terms
Treasurer	Tya Mathis-Coleman	Democratic	January 4, 2027	2030	No	Two lifetime terms
Controller	Michael MacDougall	Democratic	January 4, 2027	2030	No	Two lifetime terms
Board of Regents District 5	Stephanie Molina	Democratic	January 4, 2027	2030	No	Twelve years

== New Hampshire ==
Office	Name	Party	Term start	Next election	Term limited	Max term length
Governor	Kelly Ayotte	Republican	January 9, 2025	2028	No	—N/a
Executive Councilor District 1	Joseph Kenney	Republican	January 7, 2021	2026	No (defeated)	—N/a
Executive Councilor District 2	Karen Liot Hill	Democratic	January 9, 2025	2026	No	—N/a
Executive Councilor District 3	Janet Stevens	Republican	January 7, 2021	2026	No (defeated)	—N/a
Executive Councilor District 4	John Stephen	Republican	January 9, 2025	2026	No (defeated)	—N/a
Executive Councilor District 5	Dave Wheeler	Republican	January 7, 2021	2026	No (defeated)	—N/a

=== Incoming New Hampshire officials ===
Office	Name	Party	Term start	Next election	Term limited	Max term length
Executive Councilor District 1	Luz Bay	Democratic	January 6, 2027	2028	No	—N/a
Executive Councilor District 3	Lisa Sheldon	Democratic	January 6, 2027	2028	No	—N/a
Executive Councilor District 4	Jim O'Connell	Democratic	January 6, 2027	2028	No	—N/a
Executive Councilor District 5	Melanie Levesque	Democratic	January 6, 2027	2028	No	—N/a

== New Jersey ==
Office	Name	Party	Term start	Next election	Term limited	Max term length
Governor	Mikie Sherrill	Democratic	January 20, 2026	2029	No	Two consecutive terms
Lieutenant Governor	Shirley Emehelu	Democratic	Novemver 9, 2026	2029	No	Two consecutive terms

== New Mexico ==
Office	Name	Party	Term start	Next election	Term limited	Max term length
Governor	Michelle Lujan Grisham	Democratic	January 1, 2019	2026	Yes	Two consecutive terms
Lieutenant Governor	Howie Morales	Democratic	January 1, 2019	2026	Yes	Two consecutive terms
Secretary of State	Maggie Toulouse Oliver	Democratic	December 6, 2016	2026	Yes	Two consecutive terms
Attorney General	Raúl Torrez	Democratic	January 1, 2023	2030	Yes	Two consecutive terms
Treasurer	Laura Montoya	Democratic	January 1, 2023	2030	Yes	Two consecutive terms
Auditor	Joe Maestas	Democratic	January 1, 2023	2030	Yes	Two consecutive terms
Commissioner of Public Lands	Stephanie Garcia Richard	Democratic	January 1, 2019	2026	Yes	Two consecutive terms
Public Education Commissioner District 1	Sam Obenshain	Democratic	January 1, 2025	2028	No	—N/a
Public Education Commissioner District 2	Timothy Beck	Republican	January 1, 2023	2026	No (retiring)	—N/a
Public Education Commissioner District 3	Jacob Trujillo	Democratic	June 22, 2026	2030	No	—N/a
Public Education Commissioner District 4	Rebekka Burt	Democratic	January 1, 2021	2028	No	—N/a
Public Education Commissioner District 5	Sharon Clahchischilliage	Republican	January 1, 2023	2030	No	—N/a
Public Education Commissioner District 6	Stewart Ingham	Republican	January 1, 2023	2030	No	—N/a
Public Education Commissioner District 7	Patricia Gipson	Democratic	January 1, 2015	2026	No (retiring)	—N/a
Public Education Commissioner District 8	Michael Taylor	Republican	January 1, 2021	2028	No	—N/a
Public Education Commissioner District 9	K. T. Manis	Republican	January 1, 2021	2028	No	—N/a
Public Education Commissioner District 10	Steven Carrillo	Democratic	January 1, 2021	2028	No	—N/a

=== Incoming New Mexico officials ===
Office	Name	Party	Term start	Next election	Term limited	Max term length
Governor	Deb Haaland	Democratic	January 1, 2027	2030	No	Two consecutive terms
Lieutenant Governor	Stephanie Garcia Richard	Democratic	January 1, 2027	2030	No	Two consecutive terms
Secretary of State	Amanda López Askin	Democratic	January 1, 2027	2030	No	Two consecutive terms
Commissioner of Public Lands	Juan Sanchez	Democratic	January 1, 2027	2030	No	Two consecutive terms
Public Education Commissioner District 2	Ken Pascoe	Republican	January 1, 2027	2030	No	—N/a
Public Education Commissioner District 7	Frederick Walton Parker	Democratic	January 1, 2027	2030	No	—N/a

== New York ==
Office	Name	Party	Term start	Next election	Term limited	Max term length
Governor	Kathy Hochul	Democratic	August 24, 2021	2026	No	—N/a
Lieutenant Governor	Antonio Delgado	Democratic	May 25, 2022	2026	No (retiring)	—N/a
Attorney General	Letitia James	Democratic	January 1, 2019	2030	No	—N/a
Comptroller	Thomas DiNapoli	Democratic	February 7, 2007	2030	No	—N/a

=== Incoming New York officials ===
Office	Name	Party	Term start	Next election	Term limited	Max term length
Lieutenant Governor	Adrienne Adams	Democratic	January 1, 2027	2030	No	—N/a

== North Carolina ==
Office	Name	Party	Term start	Next election	Term limited	Max term length
Governor	Josh Stein	Democratic	January 1, 2025	2028	No	Two consecutive terms
Lieutenant Governor	Rachel Hunt	Democratic	January 1, 2025	2028	No	Two consecutive terms
Secretary of State	Elaine Marshall	Democratic	January 3, 1997	2028	No	—N/a
Attorney General	Jeff Jackson	Democratic	January 1, 2025	2028	No	—N/a
Treasurer	Brad Briner	Republican	January 1, 2025	2028	No	—N/a
Auditor	Dave Boliek	Republican	January 1, 2025	2028	No	—N/a
Agriculture and Consumer Affairs Commissioner	Steve Troxler	Republican	February 8, 2005	2028	No	—N/a
Insurance Commissioner	Mike Causey	Republican	January 1, 2017	2028	No	—N/a
Labor Commissioner	Luke Farley	Republican	January 1, 2025	2028	No	—N/a
Superintendent of Public Instruction	Mo Green	Democratic	January 1, 2025	2028	No	—N/a

== North Dakota ==
Office	Name	Party	Term start	Next election	Term limited	Max term length
Governor	Kelly Armstrong	Republican	December 15, 2024	2028	No	Two lifetime terms
Lieutenant Governor	Michelle Strinden	Republican	December 15, 2024	2028	No	—N/a
Secretary of State	Michael Howe	Republican	January 1, 2023	2030	No	—N/a
Attorney General	Drew Wrigley	Republican	February 9, 2022	2030	No	—N/a
Treasurer	Thomas Beadle	Republican	January 1, 2021	2028	No	—N/a
Auditor	Josh Gallion	Republican	January 1, 2017	2028	No	—N/a
Agriculture Commissioner	Doug Goehring	Republican	April 6, 2009	2030	No	—N/a
Insurance Commissioner	Jon Godfread	Republican	January 1, 2017	2028	No	—N/a
Superintendent of Public Instruction	Levi Bachmeier	Republican	November 24, 2025	2028	No	—N/a
Tax Commissioner	Brian Kroshus	Republican	January 4, 2022	2030	No	—N/a
Public Service Commissioners	Randy Christmann	Republican	January 15, 2013	2030	No	—N/a
Public Service Commissioners	Sheri Haugen-Hoffart	Republican	February 11, 2022	2032	No	—N/a
Public Service Commissioners	Jill Kringstad	Republican	January 6, 2025	2028	No	—N/a

== Ohio ==
Office	Name	Party	Term start	Next election	Term limited	Max term length
Governor	Mike DeWine	Republican	January 14, 2019	2026	Yes	Two consecutive terms
Lieutenant Governor	Jim Tressel	Republican	February 12, 2025	2026	No (retiring)	Two consecutive terms
Secretary of State	Frank LaRose	Republican	January 14, 2019	2026	Yes	Two consecutive terms
Attorney General	Andy Wilson	Republican	June 7, 2026	2026	No (retiring)	Two consecutive terms
Treasurer	Robert Sprague	Republican	January 14, 2019	2026	Yes	Two consecutive terms
Auditor	Keith Faber	Republican	January 14, 2019	2026	Yes	Two consecutive terms

=== Incoming Ohio officials ===
Office	Name	Party	Term start	Next election	Term limited	Max term length
Governor	Amy Acton	Democratic	January 11, 2027	2030	No	Two consecutive terms
Lieutenant Governor	David Pepper	Democratic	January 11, 2027	2030	No	Two consecutive terms
Secretary of State	Allison Russo	Democratic	January 11, 2027	2030	No	Two consecutive terms
Attorney General	John Kulewicz	Democratic	January 11, 2027	2030	No	Two consecutive terms
Treasurer	Seth Walsh	Democratic	January 11, 2027	2030	No	Two consecutive terms
Auditor	Frank LaRose	Republican	January 11, 2027	2030	No	Two consecutive terms

== Oklahoma ==
Office	Name	Party	Term start	Next election	Term limited	Max term length
Governor	Kevin Stitt	Republican	January 14, 2019	2026	Yes	Two lifetime terms
Lieutenant Governor	Matt Pinnell	Republican	January 14, 2019	2026	Yes	Two lifetime terms
Attorney General	Gentner Drummond	Republican	January 9, 2023	2026	No (retiring)	Two lifetime terms
Treasurer	Todd Russ	Republican	January 9, 2023	2026	No (primaried)	Two lifetime terms
Auditor and Inspector	Cindy Byrd	Republican	January 14, 2019	2026	Yes	Two lifetime terms
Insurance Commissioner	Glen Mulready	Republican	January 14, 2019	2026	Yes	Two lifetime terms
Superintendent of Public Instruction	Lindel Fields	Republican	October 2, 2025	2026	No (retiring)	Two lifetime terms
Labor Commissioner	Leslie Osborn	Republican	January 14, 2019	2026	Yes	Two lifetime terms
Corporation Commissioners	Brian Bingman	Republican	January 13, 2025	2030	No	Twelve years
Corporation Commissioners	Kim David	Republican	January 9, 2023	2028	No	Twelve years
Corporation Commissioners	Todd Hiett	Republican	January 12, 2015	2026	Yes	Twelve years

=== Incoming Oklahoma officials ===
Office	Name	Party	Term start	Next election	Term limited	Max term length
Governor	Mike Mazzei	Republican	January 14, 2027	2030	No	Two lifetime terms
Lieutenant Governor	T. W. Shannon	Republican	January 14, 2027	2030	No	Two lifetime terms
Attorney General	Jon Echols	Republican	January 14, 2027	2030	No	Two lifetime terms
Treasurer	Cindy Byrd	Republican	January 14, 2027	2030	No	Two lifetime terms
Auditor and Inspector	Melissa Capps	Republican	January 14, 2027	2030	No	Two lifetime terms
Insurance Commissioner	Bob Sullivan	Republican	January 14, 2027	2030	No	Two lifetime terms
Superintendent of Public Instruction	Robert Franklin	Republican	January 14, 2027	2030	No	Two lifetime terms
Labor Commissioner	Kevin West	Republican	January 14, 2027	2030	No	Two lifetime terms
Corporation Commissioners	Brad Boles	Republican	January 14, 2027	2032	No	Twelve years

== Oregon ==
Office	Name	Party	Term start	Next election	Term limited	Max term length
Governor	Tina Kotek	Democratic	January 9, 2023	2030	Yes	Eight out of twelve years
Secretary of State	Tobias Read	Democratic	January 6, 2025	2028	No	Eight out of twelve years
Attorney General	Dan Rayfield	Democratic	December 31, 2024	2028	No	—N/a
Treasurer	Elizabeth Steiner	Democratic	January 6, 2025	2028	No	Eight out of twelve years
Commissioner of Labor and Industries	Christina Stephenson	Democratic	January 2, 2023	2030	No	—N/a

== Pennsylvania ==
Office	Name	Party	Term start	Next election	Term limited	Max term length
Governor	Josh Shapiro	Democratic	January 17, 2023	2030	Yes	Two consecutive terms
Lieutenant Governor	Austin Davis	Democratic	January 17, 2023	2030	Yes	Two consecutive terms
Attorney General	Dave Sunday	Republican	January 21, 2025	2028	No	Two consecutive terms
Treasurer	Stacy Garrity	Republican	January 19, 2021	2028	Yes	Two consecutive terms
Auditor General	Tim DeFoor	Republican	January 19, 2021	2028	Yes	Two consecutive terms

== Rhode Island ==
Office	Name	Party	Term start	Next election	Term limited	Max term length
Governor	Dan McKee	Democratic	March 2, 2021	2026	No (primaried)	Two consecutive terms
Lieutenant Governor	Sabina Matos	Democratic	April 14, 2021	2030	Yes	Two consecutive terms
Secretary of State	Gregg Amore	Democratic	January 3, 2023	2030	Yes	Two consecutive terms
Attorney General	Peter Neronha	Democratic	January 1, 2019	2026	Yes	Two consecutive terms
General Treasurer	James Diossa	Democratic	January 3, 2023	2030	Yes	Two consecutive terms

=== Incoming Rhode Island officials ===
Office	Name	Party	Term start	Next election	Term limited	Max term length
Governor	Helena Foulkes	Democratic	January 5, 2027	2030	No	Two consecutive terms
Attorney General	Kim Ahern	Democratic	January 5, 2027	2030	No	Two consecutive terms

== South Carolina ==
Office	Name	Party	Term start	Next election	Term limited	Max term length
Governor	Henry McMaster	Republican	January 24, 2017	2026	Yes	Two consecutive terms
Lieutenant Governor	Pamela Evette	Republican	January 9, 2019	2026	Yes	Two consecutive terms
Secretary of State	Mark Hammond	Republican	January 15, 2003	2030	No	—N/a
Attorney General	Alan Wilson	Republican	January 12, 2011	2026	No (retiring)	—N/a
Treasurer	Curtis Loftis	Republican	January 12, 2011	2030	No	—N/a
Comptroller General	Brian Gaines	Democratic	May 12, 2023	2026	No (retiring)	—N/a
Commissioner of Agriculture	Hugh Weathers	Republican	September 14, 2004	2026	No (retiring)	—N/a
Superintendent of Education	Ellen Weaver	Republican	January 11, 2023	2030	No	—N/a

=== Incoming South Carolina officials ===
Office	Name	Party	Term start	Next election	Term limited	Max term length
Governor	Alan Wilson	Republican	January 13, 2027	2030	No	Two consecutive terms
Lieutenant Governor	Mike Reichenbach	Republican	January 13, 2027	2030	No	Two consecutive terms
Attorney General	David Stumbo	Republican	January 13, 2027	2030	No	—N/a
Comptroller General	Mike Burkhold	Republican	January 13, 2027	2030	No	—N/a
Commissioner of Agriculture	Cody Simpson	Republican	January 13, 2027	2030	No	—N/a

== South Dakota ==
Office	Name	Party	Term start	Next election	Term limited	Max term length
Governor	Larry Rhoden	Republican	January 25, 2025	2030	No	Two consecutive terms
Lieutenant Governor	Tony Venhuizen	Republican	January 30, 2025	2030	No	Two consecutive terms
Secretary of State	Monae Johnson	Republican	December 5, 2022	2026	No (primaried)	Two consecutive terms
Attorney General	Marty Jackley	Republican	January 3, 2023	2026	No (retiring)	Two consecutive terms
Treasurer	Josh Haeder	Republican	January 5, 2019	2026	Yes	Two consecutive terms
Auditor	Rich Sattgast	Republican	January 5, 2019	2026	Yes	Two consecutive terms
School and Public Lands Commissioner	Brock Greenfield	Republican	January 7, 2023	2030	Yes	Two consecutive terms
Public Utilities Commissioners	Kristie Fiegen	Republican	August 9, 2011	2030	No	—N/a
Public Utilities Commissioners	Gary Hanson	Republican	January 7, 2003	2026	No (retiring)	—N/a
Public Utilities Commissioners	Chris Nelson	Republican	January 8, 2011	2028	No	—N/a

=== Incoming South Dakota officials ===
Office	Name	Party	Term start	Next election	Term limited	Max term length
Secretary of State	Heather Baxter	Republican	January 9, 2027	2030	No	Two consecutive terms
Attorney General	Lance Russell	Republican	January 9, 2027	2030	No	Two consecutive terms
Treasurer	Melissa Hull	Republican	January 9, 2027	2030	No	Two consecutive terms
Auditor	Catherine Barranco	Republican	January 9, 2027	2030	No	Two consecutive terms
Public Utilities Commissioners	Don Haggar	Republican	January 9, 2027	2032	No	—N/a

== Tennessee ==
Office	Name	Party	Term start	Next election	Term limited	Max term length
Governor	Bill Lee	Republican	January 19, 2019	2026	Yes	Two consecutive terms

=== Incoming Tennessee officials ===
Office	Name	Party	Term start	Next election	Term limited	Max term length
Governor	Marsha Blackburn	Republican	January 16, 2027	2030	No	Two consecutive terms

== Texas ==
Office	Name	Party	Term start	Next election	Term limited	Max term length
Governor	Greg Abbott	Republican	January 20, 2015	2026	No (defeated)	—N/a
Lieutenant Governor	Dan Patrick	Republican	January 20, 2015	2026	No (defeated)	—N/a
Attorney General	Ken Paxton	Republican	January 5, 2015 (Note: Suspended: May 27, 2023 – September 16, 2023)	2026	No (retiring)	—N/a
Comptroller of Public Accounts	Don Huffines; Acting	Republican	August 1, 2026	2026	No (defeated)	—N/a
General Land Commissioner	Dawn Buckingham	Republican	January 10, 2023	2026	No (defeated)	—N/a
Agriculture Commissioner	Sid Miller	Republican	January 20, 2015	2026	No (primaried)	—N/a
Railroad Commissioners	Wayne Christian	Republican	January 9, 2017	2028	No	—N/a
Railroad Commissioners	Christi Craddick	Republican	December 12, 2012	2030	No	—N/a
Railroad Commissioners	Jim Wright	Republican	January 4, 2021	2026	No (primaried)	—N/a
Board of Education District 1	Gustavo Reveles	Democratic	January 1, 2025	2028	No	—N/a
Board of Education District 2	LJ Francis	Republican	January 1, 2023	2026	No (primaried)	—N/a
Board of Education District 3	Marisa Perez-Diaz	Democratic	January 1, 2013	2028	No	—N/a
Board of Education District 4	Tammie Nielsen	Republican	August 14, 2026	2026 (special)	No (defeated)	—N/a
Board of Education District 5	Rebecca Bell-Metereau	Democratic	January 1, 2021	2026	No (retiring)	—N/a
Board of Education District 6	Will Hickman	Republican	January 1, 2021	2026	No (retiring)	—N/a
Board of Education District 7	Julie Pickren	Republican	January 1, 2023	2030	No	—N/a
Board of Education District 8	Audrey Young	Republican	January 1, 2021	2026	No	—N/a
Board of Education District 9	Keven Ellis	Republican	January 1, 2017	2026	No (retiring)	—N/a
Board of Education District 10	Tom Maynard	Republican	January 1, 2013	2028	No	—N/a
Board of Education District 11	Brandon Hall	Republican	January 1, 2025	2028	No	—N/a
Board of Education District 12	Pam Little	Republican	January 1, 2019	2028	No	—N/a
Board of Education District 13	Tiffany Clark	Democratic	January 1, 2025	2030	No	—N/a
Board of Education District 14	Evelyn Brooks	Republican	January 1, 2023	2026	No (retiring)	—N/a
Board of Education District 15	Aaron Kinsey	Republican	January 1, 2023	2028	No	—N/a

=== Incoming Texas officials ===
Office	Name	Party	Term start	Next election	Term limited	Max term length
Governor	Gina Hinojosa	Democratic	January 19, 2027	2030	No	—N/a
Lieutenant Governor	Vikki Goodwin	Democratic	January 19, 2027	2030	No	—N/a
Attorney General	Nathan M. Johnson	Democratic	January 19, 2027	2030	No	—N/a
Comptroller of Public Accounts	Sarah Eckhardt	Democratic	January 19, 2027	2030	No	—N/a
General Land Commissioner	Benjamin Flores	Democratic	January 19, 2027	2030	No	—N/a
Agriculture Commissioner	Clayton Tucker	Democratic	January 19, 2027	2030	No	—N/a
Railroad Commissioners	Jon Rosenthal	Democratic	January 19, 2027	2032	No	—N/a
Board of Education District 2	Thomas Garcia	Democratic	January 19, 2027	2030	No	—N/a
Board of Education District 4	Coretta Mallet-Fontenot	Democratic	January 19, 2027	2030	No	—N/a
Board of Education District 5	Allison Bush	Democratic	January 19, 2027	2030	No	—N/a
Board of Education District 6	Michelle Palmer	Democratic	January 19, 2027	2030	No	—N/a
Board of Education District 8	Dana Van De Walker	Democratic	January 19, 2027	2030	No	—N/a
Board of Education District 9	Kason Huddleston	Republican	January 19, 2027	2030	No	—N/a
Board of Education District 14	Mindy Bumgarner	Republican	January 19, 2027	2030	No	—N/a

== Utah ==
Office	Name	Party	Term start	Next election	Term limited	Max term length
Governor	Spencer Cox	Republican	January 4, 2021	2028	No (retiring)	—N/a
Lieutenant Governor	Deidre Henderson	Republican	January 4, 2021	2028	No	—N/a
Attorney General	Derek Brown	Republican	January 6, 2025	2028	No	—N/a
Treasurer	Marlo Oaks	Republican	June 29, 2021	2028	No	—N/a
Auditor	Tina Cannon	Republican	January 6, 2025	2028	No	—N/a
Board of Education District 1	Jennie Earl	Republican	January 9, 2019	2030	No	—N/a
Board of Education District 2	Katrina Gibson	Republican	November 5, 2026	2026	No (retiring)	—N/a
Board of Education District 3	Rod Hall	Republican	January 6, 2025	2028	No	—N/a
Board of Education District 4	LeAnn Wood	Republican	January 2, 2023	2030	No	—N/a
Board of Education District 5	Sarah Reale	Democratic	January 2, 2023	2030	No	—N/a
Board of Education District 6	Carol Lear	Democratic	January 2, 2023	2028	No	—N/a
Board of Education District 7	Erin Longacre	Republican	January 2, 2023	2026 (special)	No (defeated)	—N/a
Board of Education District 8	Christina Boggess	Republican	January 2, 2023	2026	No (retiring)	—N/a
Board of Education District 9	Amanda Bollinger	Republican	January 6, 2025	2028	No	—N/a
Board of Education District 10	Matt Hymas	Republican	January 2, 2023	2028	No	—N/a
Board of Education District 11	Cindy Davis	Republican	January 2, 2023	2026	No (retiring)	—N/a
Board of Education District 12	Cole Kelley	Republican	January 6, 2025	2028	No	—N/a
Board of Education District 13	Randy Boothe	Republican	January 4, 2021	2028	No	—N/a
Board of Education District 14	Cindy Davis	Republican	January 2, 2023	2026	No (retiring)	—N/a
Board of Education District 15	Joann Brinton	Republican	January 6, 2025	2028	No	—N/a

=== Incoming Utah officials ===
Office	Name	Party	Term start	Next election	Term limited	Max term length
Board of Education District 2	Sarah Reale	Democratic	January 4, 2027	2030	No	—N/a
Board of Education District 7	James Martin	Democratic	January 4, 2027	2028	No	—N/a
Board of Education District 8	Araueni Olivares	Democratic	January 4, 2027	2030	No	—N/a
Board of Education District 11	Tracy Nuttall	Republican	January 4, 2027	2030	No	—N/a
Board of Education District 14	Linda Hanks	Republican	January 4, 2027	2030	No	—N/a

== Vermont ==
Office	Name	Party	Term start	Next election	Term limited	Max term length
Governor	Phil Scott	Republican	January 5, 2017	2028	No	—N/a
Lieutenant Governor	John S. Rodgers	Republican	January 9, 2025	2026	No (defeated)	—N/a
Secretary of State	Sarah Copeland Hanzas	Democratic	January 5, 2023	2028	No	—N/a
Attorney General	Charity Clark	Democratic	January 5, 2023	2028	No	—N/a
Treasurer	Mike Pieciak	Democratic	January 5, 2023	2028	No	—N/a
Auditor of Accounts	Doug Hoffer	Progressive	January 10, 2013	2026	No (retiring)	—N/a
Auditor of Accounts	Doug Hoffer	Democratic	January 10, 2013	2026	No (retiring)	—N/a

=== Incoming Vermont officials ===
Office	Name	Party	Term start	Next election	Term limited	Max term length
Lieutenant Governor	Molly Gray	Democratic	January 7, 2027	2028	No	—N/a
Auditor of Accounts	Tim Ashe	Progressive	January 7, 2027	2028	No	—N/a
Auditor of Accounts	Tim Ashe	Democratic	January 7, 2027	2028	No	—N/a

== Virginia ==
Office	Name	Party	Term start	Next election	Term limited	Max term length
Governor	Abigail Spanberger	Democratic	January 17, 2026	2029	Yes	One consecutive term
Lieutenant Governor	Ghazala Hashmi	Democratic	January 17, 2026	2029	No	—N/a
Attorney General	Jay Jones	Democratic	January 17, 2026	2029	No	—N/a

== Washington ==
Office	Name	Party	Term start	Next election	Term limited	Max term length
Governor	Bob Ferguson	Democratic	January 15, 2025	2028	No	—N/a
Lieutenant Governor	Denny Heck	Democratic	January 13, 2021	2028	No	—N/a
Secretary of State	Steve Hobbs	Democratic	November 22, 2021	2028	No	—N/a
Attorney General	Nick Brown	Democratic	January 15, 2025	2028	No	—N/a
Treasurer	Mike Pellicciotti	Democratic	January 13, 2021	2028	No	—N/a
Auditor	Pat McCarthy	Democratic	January 11, 2017	2028	No	—N/a
Insurance Commissioner	Patty Kuderer	Democratic	January 15, 2025	2028	No	—N/a
Public Lands and Natural Resources Commissioner	Dave Upthegrove	Democratic	January 15, 2025	2028	No	—N/a
Superintendent of Public Instruction	Chris Reykdal	Democratic	January 11, 2017	2028	No (retiring)	—N/a

== West Virginia ==
Office	Name	Party	Term start	Next election	Term limited	Max term length
Governor	Patrick Morrisey	Republican	January 13, 2025	2028	No	Two consecutive terms
Secretary of State	Kris Warner	Republican	January 13, 2025	2028	No	—N/a
Attorney General	JB McCuskey	Republican	January 13, 2025	2028	No	—N/a
Treasurer	Larry Pack	Republican	January 3, 2025	2028	No	—N/a
Auditor	Mark Hunt	Republican	January 13, 2025	2028	No	—N/a
Commissioner of Agriculture	Kent Leonhardt	Republican	January 16, 2017	2028	No	—N/a

== Wisconsin ==
Office	Name	Party	Term start	Next election	Term limited	Max term length
Governor	Tony Evers	Democratic	January 7, 2019	2026	No (retiring)	—N/a
Lieutenant Governor	Sara Rodriguez	Democratic	January 3, 2023	2026	No (retiring)	—N/a
Secretary of State	Sarah Godlewski	Democratic	March 17, 2023	2026	No (retiring)	—N/a
Attorney General	Josh Kaul	Democratic	January 7, 2019	2030	No	—N/a
Treasurer	John Leiber	Republican	January 3, 2023	2026	No (defeated)	—N/a
Superintendent of Public Instruction	Jill Underly	Democratic	July 5, 2021	2029	No	—N/a

=== Incoming Wisconsin officials ===
Office	Name	Party	Term start	Next election	Term limited	Max term length
Governor	David Crowley	Democratic	January 4, 2027	2030	No	—N/a
Lieutenant Governor	Sarah Godlewski	Democratic	January 4, 2027	2030	No	—N/a
Secretary of State	JoCasta Zamarripa	Democratic	January 4, 2027	2030	No	—N/a
Treasurer	Yee Leng Xiong	Democratic	January 4, 2027	2030	No	—N/a

== Wyoming ==
Office	Name	Party	Term start	Next election	Term limited	Max term length
Governor	Mark Gordon	Republican	January 7, 2019	2026	Yes	Eight out of sixteen years
Secretary of State	Chuck Gray	Republican	January 2, 2023	2026	No (retiring)	—N/a
Treasurer	Curt Meier	Republican	January 7, 2019	2030	No	—N/a
Auditor	Kristi Racines	Republican	January 7, 2019	2030	No	—N/a
Superintendent of Public Instruction	Megan Degenfelder	Republican	January 2, 2023	2026	No (retiring)	—N/a

=== Incoming Wyoming officials ===
Office	Name	Party	Term start	Next election	Term limited	Max term length
Governor	Eric Barlow	Republican	January 4, 2027	2030	No	Eight out of sixteen years
Secretary of State	Robert Short	Republican	January 4, 2027	2030	No	—N/a
Superintendent of Public Instruction	Steve Harshman	Republican	January 4, 2027	2030	No	—N/a

== American Samoa ==
Office	Name	Party	Term start	Next election	Term limited	Max term length
Governor	Nikolao Pula	Republican	January 3, 2025	2028	No	Two consecutive terms
Lieutenant Governor	Pulu Ae Ae	Republican	January 3, 2025	2028	No	Two consecutive terms

== District of Columbia ==
Office	Name	Party	Term start	Next election	Term limited	Max term length
Mayor	Muriel Bowser	Democratic	January 2, 2015	2026	No (retiring)	—N/a
Attorney General	Brian Schwalb	Democratic	January 2, 2023	2030	No	—N/a

=== Incoming District of Columbia officials ===
Office	Name	Party	Term start	Next election	Term limited	Max term length
Mayor	Janeese Lewis George	Democratic	January 2, 2027	2030	No	—N/a

== Guam ==
Office	Name	Party	Term start	Next election	Term limited	Max term length
Governor	Lou Leon Guerrero	Democratic	January 7, 2019	2026	Yes	Two consecutive terms
Lieutenant Governor	Josh Tenorio	Democratic	January 7, 2019	2026	Yes	Two consecutive terms
Attorney General	Doug Moylan	Republican	January 2, 2023	2026	No (defeated)	—N/a
Public Auditor	Benjamin Cruz	Democratic	September 13, 2018	2028	No	—N/a
Consolidated Commission on Utilities	Melvin Duenas	Independent	January 1, 2025	2028	No	—N/a
Consolidated Commission on Utilities	Mike Limtiaco	Republican	January 1, 2019	2030	No	—N/a
Consolidated Commission on Utilities	Pedro Martinez	Independent	March 22, 2021	2028	No	—N/a
Consolidated Commission on Utilities	Simon Sanchez	Republican	January 1, 2003	2030	No	—N/a
Consolidated Commission on Utilities	Francis Santos	Democratic	January 1, 2015	2030	No	—N/a
Board of Education (Note: The Guam Board of Education also has six appointed members, one for each elected member, that are not included here.)	Peter Ada	Republican	January 4, 2021	2026	No (retiring)	—N/a
Board of Education	Judi Guthertz	Democratic	January 6, 2025	2026	No (retiring)	—N/a
Board of Education	Maria Gutierrez	Democratic	January 1, 2007	2026	No (retiring)	—N/a
Board of Education	Ron McNinch	Republican	January 2, 2023	2026	No	—N/a
Board of Education	Mary Okada	Republican	January 4, 2021	2026	No (retiring)	—N/a
Board of Education	Angel Sablan	Democratic	January 2, 2023	2026	No (retiring)	—N/a

=== Incoming Guam officials ===
Office	Name	Party	Term start	Next election	Term limited	Max term length
Governor	Vicente Ada	Republican	January 4, 2027	2030	No	Two consecutive terms
Lieutenant Governor	Edward Calvo	Republican	January 4, 2027	2030	No	Two consecutive terms
Attorney General	Phil Tydingco	Independent	January 4, 2027	2030	No	—N/a
Board of Education
Board of Education	John R. Taitano II	Democratic	January 4, 2027	2030	No	—N/a
Board of Education	Isaiah Aguon	Republican	January 4, 2027	2030	No	—N/a
Board of Education	Ronald Ayuyu	Democratic	January 4, 2027	2030	No	—N/a

== Northern Mariana Islands ==
Office	Name	Party	Term start	Next election	Term limited	Max term length
Governor	Dave Apatang	Independent	July 23, 2025	2026	No (retiring)	Two lifetime terms
Lieutenant Governor	Dennis Mendiola	Republican	July 23, 2025	2026	No (retiring)	Two lifetime terms
Attorney General	Ed Manibusan	Democratic	January 12, 2015	2026	No (retiring)	—N/a
Board of Education District 1 (Note: The Northern Mariana Islands Board of Education also has three appointed members, that are not included here.)	Anthony Barcinas	Independent	January 13, 2025	2028	No	—N/a
Board of Education District 2	Antonio Borja	Independent	October 30, 2020	2026	No (retiring)	—N/a
Board of Education District 3	Aschumar Ogumoro-Uludong	Independent	January 13, 2025	2028	No	—N/a
Board of Education District 3	Andrew Orsini	Independent	January 14, 2019	2026	No (retiring)	—N/a
Board of Education District 3	Maisie Tenorio	Independent	January 11, 2021	2028	No	—N/a

=== Incoming Northern Mariana Islands officials ===
Office	Name	Party	Term start	Next election	Term limited	Max term length
Board of Education District 3	Daniel Quitugua	Democratic	January 11, 2027	2030	No	—N/a

== Puerto Rico ==
Office	Name	Party	Term start	Next election	Term limited	Max term length
Governor	Jenniffer González-Colón	New Progressive	January 2, 2025	2028	No	—N/a
Governor	Jenniffer González-Colón	Republican	January 2, 2025	2028	No	—N/a

== United States Virgin Islands ==
Office	Name	Party	Term start	Next election	Term limited	Max term length
Governor	Albert Bryan	Democratic	January 7, 2019	2026	Yes	Two consecutive terms
Lieutenant Governor	Tregenza Roach	Democratic	January 7, 2019	2026	Yes	Two consecutive terms
Board of Education (Note: The U.S. Virgin Islands elects eight addition members to its Board of Education by district, with one member elected at large by voters who must be a resident of Saint John. The other members are not listed here.)	Abigail Hendricks Cagan	Independent	January 6, 2025	2028	No	—N/a
Constitutional Convention (Note: The Virgin Islands Constitutional Convention elected 15 members to draft an inaugural constitution in 2024, and later extended the scheduled referendum to July 3, 2027 with a proposed effective date of January 31, 2028. Wells is the single member elected at large. The other members are not listed here.)	Alecia Wells	Independent	January 18, 2025	—N/a	Yes	—N/a

=== Incoming United States Virgin Islands officials ===
Office	Name	Party	Term start	Next election	Term limited	Max term length
Governor	Stacey Plaskett	Democratic	January 4, 2027	2030	No	Two consecutive terms
Lieutenant Governor	Milton E. Potter	Democratic	January 4, 2027	2030	No	Two consecutive terms

== See also ==
- List of United States governors
- List of United States lieutenant governors
- List of state parties of the Democratic Party (United States)
- List of state parties of the Republican Party (United States)
