= 2026 Nebraska State Board of Education election =

- November 3, 2026; Officially nonpartisan

4 of 8 seats on the Nebraska State Board of Education 5 seats needed for a majority
Party	Republican	Democratic
Current seats	4	4
Seats needed	▲1	▲1

The 2026 Nebraska State Board of Education election was held on November 3, 2026, to elect four members to the Nebraska State Board of Education. Primary elections were held on May 12. The election is officially nonpartisan, but many candidates align with a political party.

== District 5 ==
=== Primary election ===
==== Candidates ====
===== Advanced to general election =====
- Michaela Conway, Crete school board member (Democratic)
- Angie Eberspacher, former educator (Republican)

===== Eliminated in primary =====
- Lana Daws, retired educator and principal (Republican)

===== Declined =====
- Kirk Penner, incumbent board member (Republican)

==== Endorsements ====
Angie Eberspacher

State board of education members

- Kirk Penner, member of the state board of education from the 5th district (2021–present)

==== Results ====
Nonpartisan primary
Candidate	Votes	%
Angie Eberspacher	19,956	45.3
Michaela Conway	13,878	31.5
Lana Daws	10,194	23.2
Total votes	44,028	100.0

=== General election ===
==== Results ====
2026 Nebraska State Board of Education election, district 5
Candidate	Votes	%
Angie Eberspacher	45,407	55.70
Michaela Conway	36,107	44.30
Total votes	81,514	100.00

== District 6 ==
=== Primary election ===
==== Candidates ====
===== Advanced to general election =====
- Sherry Jones, incumbent board member (Republican)
- Grady Erickson, attorney (Democratic)

==== Results ====
Nonpartisan primary
Candidate	Votes	%
Sherry Jones (incumbent)	23,271	64.5
Grady Erickson	12,788	35.5
Total votes	36,059	100.0

=== General election ===
==== Results ====
2026 Nebraska State Board of Education election, district 6
Candidate	Votes	%
Sherry Jones (incumbent)	41,090	62.21
Grady Erickson	24,959	37.79
Total votes	66,049	100.00

== District 7 ==
=== Primary election ===
==== Candidates ====
===== Advanced to general election =====
- Elizabeth Tegtmeier, incumbent board member (Republican)

==== Results ====
Nonpartisan primary
Candidate	Votes	%
Elizabeth Tegtmeier (incumbent)	37,190	100.0
Total votes	37,190	100.0

=== General election ===
==== Results ====
2026 Nebraska State Board of Education election, district 7
Candidate	Votes	%
Elizabeth Tegtmeier (incumbent)	68,830	100.00
Total votes	68,830	100.00

== District 8 ==
=== Primary election ===
==== Candidates ====
===== Advanced to general election =====
- Lou Ann Goding, former Omaha Public Schools board president (Republican)
- Sherrye Hutcherson, Bellevue University executive vice president (Nonpartisan)

===== Declined =====
- Deborah Neary, incumbent board member (Democratic)

==== Endorsements ====
Sherrye Hutcherson

State board of education members

- Deborah Neary, member of the state board of education from the 8th district (2019–present)

==== Results ====
Nonpartisan primary
Candidate	Votes	%
Sherrye Hutcherson	23,852	52.2
Lou Ann Goding	21,821	47.8
Total votes	45,673	100.0

=== General election ===
==== Results ====
2026 Nebraska State Board of Education election, district 8
Candidate	Votes	%
Lou Ann Goding	40,352	51.19
Sherrye Hutcherson	38,469	48.81
Total votes	78,821	100.00
