= 2026 Utah State Board of Education election =

- November 3, 2026

8 of 15 seats on the Utah State Board of Education 8 seats needed for a majority
| Party | Republican | Democratic |
| Current seats | 13 | 2 |
| Seats needed | Steady | ▲6 |

The 2026 Utah State Board of Education election was held on November 3, 2026, to elect eight of fifteen seats on the Utah State Board of Education. Primary elections were held on June 23.

== District 1 ==
=== Republican primary ===
==== Candidates ====
===== Nominee =====
- Jennie Earl, incumbent board member

=== Democratic primary ===
==== Candidates ====
===== Nominee =====
- Cathy Callow-Heusser

===== Eliminated at convention =====
- Milo Anderson
- Curtis Benjamin

== District 2 ==
=== Republican primary ===
==== Candidates ====
===== Withdrawn =====
- Joseph Kerry, former board member

=== Democratic primary ===
==== Candidates ====
===== Nominee =====
- Kacee Weaver

== District 4 ==
=== Republican primary ===
==== Candidates ====
===== Nominee =====
- LeAnn Wood, incumbent board member

===== Eliminated at convention =====
- Gary Widders, perennial candidate

===== Withdrawn =====
- Adam Gerlach

=== Democratic primary ===
==== Candidates ====
===== Eliminated at convention =====
- Heather Dopp

== District 5 ==
=== Democratic primary ===
==== Candidates ====
===== Nominee =====
- Sarah Reale, incumbent board member

=== Republican primary ===
==== Candidates ====
===== Withdrawn =====
- J. Michael Clara

== District 7 (special) ==
=== Republican primary ===
==== Candidates ====
===== Nominee =====
- Erin Longacre, incumbent board member

=== Democratic primary ===
==== Candidates ====
===== Nominee =====
- James Martin

== District 8 ==
=== Republican primary ===
==== Candidates ====
===== Nominee =====
- Nicole McDermott

===== Eliminated in primary =====
- Trina Christensen

===== Declined =====
- Christina Boggess, incumbent board member

==== Results ====
Republican primary
| Party | Candidate | Votes | % |
|---|---|---|---|
| Republican | Nicole McDermott | 5,780 | 58.8 |
| Republican | Trina Christensen | 4,047 | 41.2 |
| Total votes | | 9,827 | 100.0 |

=== Democratic primary ===
==== Candidates ====
===== Nominee =====
- Araueni Olivares

== District 11 ==
=== Republican primary ===
==== Candidates ====
===== Nominee =====
- Tracy Nuttall, legislative attorney

===== Eliminated in primary =====
- Terry Hutchinson

===== Declined =====
- Cindy Davis, incumbent board member

==== Results ====
Republican primary
| Party | Candidate | Votes | % |
|---|---|---|---|
| Republican | Tracy Nuttall | 10,297 | 50.7 |
| Republican | Terry Hutchinson | 10,020 | 49.3 |
| Total votes | | 20,317 | 100.0 |

=== Democratic primary ===
==== Candidates ====
===== Nominee =====
- Lacey Peterson

== District 14 ==
=== Republican primary ===
==== Candidates ====
===== Nominee =====
- Linda Hanks

===== Eliminated in primary =====
- Nichole Isom

===== Eliminated at convention =====
- Will Pierce

===== Declined =====
- Emily Green, incumbent board member

==== Results ====
Republican primary
| Party | Candidate | Votes | % |
|---|---|---|---|
| Republican | Linda Hanks | 21,646 | 68.8 |
| Republican | Nichole Isom | 9,830 | 31.2 |
| Total votes | | 31,476 | 100.0 |

=== Democratic primary ===
==== Candidates ====
===== Withdrawn =====
- Danielle Stratton
