= 2026 New Mexico Public Education Commission election =

- November 3, 2026

5 of 10 seats on the New Mexico Public Education Commission 6 seats needed for a majority
Party	Democratic	Republican
Current seats	5	5

The 2026 New Mexico Public Education Commission election was held on November 3, 2026, to elect five of ten members to the New Mexico Public Education Commission. Primary elections were held on June 2, 2026.

== District 2 ==
=== Republican primary ===
==== Candidates ====
===== Nominee =====
- Ken Pascoe, engineer

===== Declined =====
- Timothy Beck, incumbent commissioner

==== Results ====
Republican primary
Party	Candidate	Votes	%
Republican	Ken Pascoe	10,841	100.0
Total votes		10,841	100.0

=== General election ===
==== Results ====
2026 New Mexico Public Education Commission election, district 2
Party	Candidate	Votes	%
Republican	Ken Pascoe		
Total votes			100.00

== District 3 ==
=== Democratic primary ===
==== Candidates ====
===== Nominee =====
- Jacob Trujillo, incumbent commissioner (write-in) (appointed after primary)

==== Results ====
Democratic primary
Party	Candidate	Votes	%
Democratic	Jacob Trujillo (write-in)	4,644	100.0
Total votes		4,644	100.0

=== General election ===
==== Results ====
2026 New Mexico Public Education Commission election, district 3
Party	Candidate	Votes	%
Democratic	Jacob Trujillo (incumbent)		
Forward	Dennis Dinge		
Total votes			100.00

== District 5 ==
=== Republican primary ===
==== Candidates ====
===== Nominee =====
- Sharon Clahchischilliage, incumbent commissioner

==== Results ====
Republican primary
Party	Candidate	Votes	%
Republican	Sharon Clahchischilliage (incumbent)	8,987	100.0
Total votes		8,987	100.0

=== General election ===
==== Results ====
2026 New Mexico Public Education Commission election, district 5
Party	Candidate	Votes	%
Republican	Sharon Chalchischilliage (incumbent)		
Total votes			100.00

== District 6 ==
=== Republican primary ===
==== Candidates ====
===== Nominee =====
- Stewart Ingham, incumbent commissioner

==== Results ====
Republican primary
Party	Candidate	Votes	%
Republican	Stewart Ingham (incumbent)	12,890	100.0
Total votes		12,890	100.0

=== General election ===
==== Results ====
2026 New Mexico Public Education Commission election, district 6
Party	Candidate	Votes	%
Republican	Stewart Ingham (incumbent)		
Total votes			100.00

== District 7 ==
=== Democratic primary ===
==== Candidates ====
===== Nominee =====
- Frederick Parker

===== Declined =====
- Patricia Gipson, incumbent commissioner

==== Results ====
Democratic primary
Party	Candidate	Votes	%
Democratic	Frederick Parker	12,665	100.0
Total votes		12,665	100.0

=== Republican primary ===
==== Candidates ====
===== Nominee =====
- John Foreman, nominee for the 52nd state house district in 2020 and 2022

==== Results ====
Republican primary
Party	Candidate	Votes	%
Republican	John Foreman	5,468	100.0
Total votes		5,468	100.0

=== General election ===
==== Results ====
2026 New Mexico Public Education Commission election, district 7
Party	Candidate	Votes	%
Democratic	Frederick Parker		
Republican	John Foreman		
Total votes			100.00
