= 2026 South Dakota Public Utilities Commission election =

- November 3, 2026
Candidate	Don Haggar	Frank Kloucek
Party	Republican	Democratic
Popular vote	174,568	115,224
Percentage	60.2%	39.8%
- County results Haggar: 50–60% 60–70% 70–80% 80–90% >90% Kloucek: 50–60% 60–70% 70–80% 80–90%
Public Utilities Commissioner before election
Gary Hanson
Republican
Elected Public Utilities Commissioner
TBD

The 2026 South Dakota Public Utilities Commission election was held on November 3, 2026, to elect one of three members of the South Dakota Public Utilities Commission. Incumbent Republican Gary Hanson declined to run for re-election.

== Republican convention ==
=== Candidates ===
==== Nominee ====
- Don Haggar, former speaker pro tempore of the South Dakota House of Representatives (2017) and former state representative from the 10th district (2013–2017)

==== Eliminated at convention ====
- Peri Pourier, state representative from the 27th district (2019–present)

==== Declined ====
- Gary Hanson, incumbent public utilities commissioner

== Democratic convention ==
=== Candidates ===
==== Nominee ====
- Frank Kloucek, former state senator from the 19th district (2003–2011) and former state representative from the 19th district (2011–2013; 1991–2003)
