= 2026 Kansas State Board of Education election =

- November 3, 2026
	First party	Second party
Party	Republican	Democratic
Seats before	7	3
Seats after	6	4
Seat change	▼1	▲1

The 2026 Kansas State Board of Education election was held on November 3, 2026, to elect five of ten seats to the Kansas State Board of Education. Primary elections were held on August 4.

== District 1 ==
=== Republican primary ===
==== Candidates ====
===== Nominee =====
- Amy Cawvey, former local school board member

===== Declined =====
- Danny Zeck, incumbent board member

==== Results ====
Republican primary
Party	Candidate	Votes	%
Republican	Amy Cawvey	27,541	100.0
Total votes		27,541	100.0

=== Democratic primary ===
==== Candidates ====
===== Nominee =====
- Jennifer Lloyd, elementary school librarian

==== Results ====
Democratic primary
Party	Candidate	Votes	%
Democratic	Jennifer Lloyd	16,061	100.0
Total votes		16,061	100.0

=== General election ===
==== Results ====
2026 Kansas State Board of Education election, district 1
Party	Candidate	Votes	%
Republican	Amy Cawvey	55,736	54.66
Democratic	Jennifer Lloyd	46,231	45.34
Total votes		101,967	100.00

== District 3 ==
=== Republican primary ===
==== Candidates ====
===== Nominee =====
- Jim McMullen, business owner and former Blue Valley school board member

===== Eliminated in primary =====
- Steve Roberts, teacher

===== Declined =====
- Michelle Dombrosky, incumbent board member

==== Results ====
Republican primary
Party	Candidate	Votes	%
Republican	Jim McMullen	20,375	63.5
Republican	Steve Roberts	11,699	36.5
Total votes		32,074	100.0

=== Democratic primary ===
==== Candidates ====
===== Nominee =====
- Amy Diediker, former music teacher

==== Results ====
Democratic primary
Party	Candidate	Votes	%
Democratic	Amy Diediker	27,976	100.0
Total votes		27,976	100.0

=== General election ===
==== Results ====
2026 Kansas State Board of Education election, district 3
Party	Candidate	Votes	%
Democratic	Amy Diediker	74,482	55.15
Republican	Jim McMullen	60,568	44.85
Total votes		135,050	100.00

== District 5 ==
=== Republican primary ===
==== Candidates ====
===== Nominee =====
- Jean Clifford, retired attorney

===== Eliminated in primary =====
- Kelly Ancar, nursing educator

===== Declined =====
- Cathy Hopkins, incumbent board member

==== Results ====
Republican primary
Party	Candidate	Votes	%
Republican	Jean Clifford	19,038	51.1
Republican	Kelly Ancar	18,250	48.9
Total votes		37,288	100.0

=== Democratic primary ===
==== Candidates ====
===== Nominee =====
- Lorie Wood, retired teacher

==== Results ====
Democratic primary
Party	Candidate	Votes	%
Democratic	Lorie Wood	6,145	100.0
Total votes		6,145	100.0

=== General election ===
==== Results ====
2026 Kansas State Board of Education election, district 5
Party	Candidate	Votes	%
Republican	Jean Clifford	65,139	73.16
Democratic	Lorie Wood	23,901	26.84
Total votes		89,040	100.00

== District 7 ==
=== Republican primary ===
==== Candidates ====
===== Nominee =====
- Alana McWilliams, small business owner

===== Declined =====
- Denis Hershberger, incumbent board member

==== Results ====
Republican primary
Party	Candidate	Votes	%
Republican	Alana McWilliams	33,475	100.0
Total votes		33,475	100.0

=== Democratic primary ===
==== Candidates ====
===== Nominee =====
- Ann Zimmerman, Salina school board member

==== Results ====
Democratic primary
Party	Candidate	Votes	%
Democratic	Ann Zimmerman	12,252	100.0
Total votes		12,252	100.0

=== General election ===
==== Results ====
2026 Kansas State Board of Education election, district 7
Party	Candidate	Votes	%
Republican	Alana McWilliams	67,331	62.77
Democratic	Ann Zimmerman	39,939	37.23
Total votes		107,270	100.00

== District 9 ==
=== Republican primary ===
==== Candidates ====
===== Nominee =====
- Destry Brown, former Fort Scott superintendent

===== Eliminated in primary =====
- Kristian Gerken, Paola school board member
- Renee Slinkard

===== Declined =====
- Jim Porter, incumbent board member

==== Results ====
Republican primary
Party	Candidate	Votes	%
Republican	Destry Brown	16,228	43.4
Republican	Kristian Gerken	13,452	36.0
Republican	Renee Slinkard	7,704	20.6
Total votes		37,384	100.0

=== Democratic primary ===
==== Candidates ====
===== Nominee =====
- Heather Guernsey, Chanute school board member

==== Results ====
Democratic primary
Party	Candidate	Votes	%
Democratic	Heather Guernsey	11,761	100.0
Total votes		11,761	100.0

=== General election ===
==== Results ====
2026 Kansas State Board of Education election, district 9
Party	Candidate	Votes	%
Republican	Destry Brown	67,515	68.64
Democratic	Heather Guernsey	30,845	31.36
Total votes		98,360	100.00
