= State Superintendent of Public Instruction =

State Superintendent of Education is an elected office of a constitutional nature in some U.S. states and may refer to:

- California State Superintendent of Public Instruction
- Montana Superintendent of Public Instruction
- North Carolina Superintendent of Public Instruction
- Oklahoma Superintendent of Public Instruction
- Oregon Superintendent of Public Instruction
- Texas Commissioner of Education
- Washington State Superintendent of Public Instruction
- Wisconsin Superintendent of Public Instruction
