= 2026 Oklahoma Labor Commissioner election =

- November 3, 2026
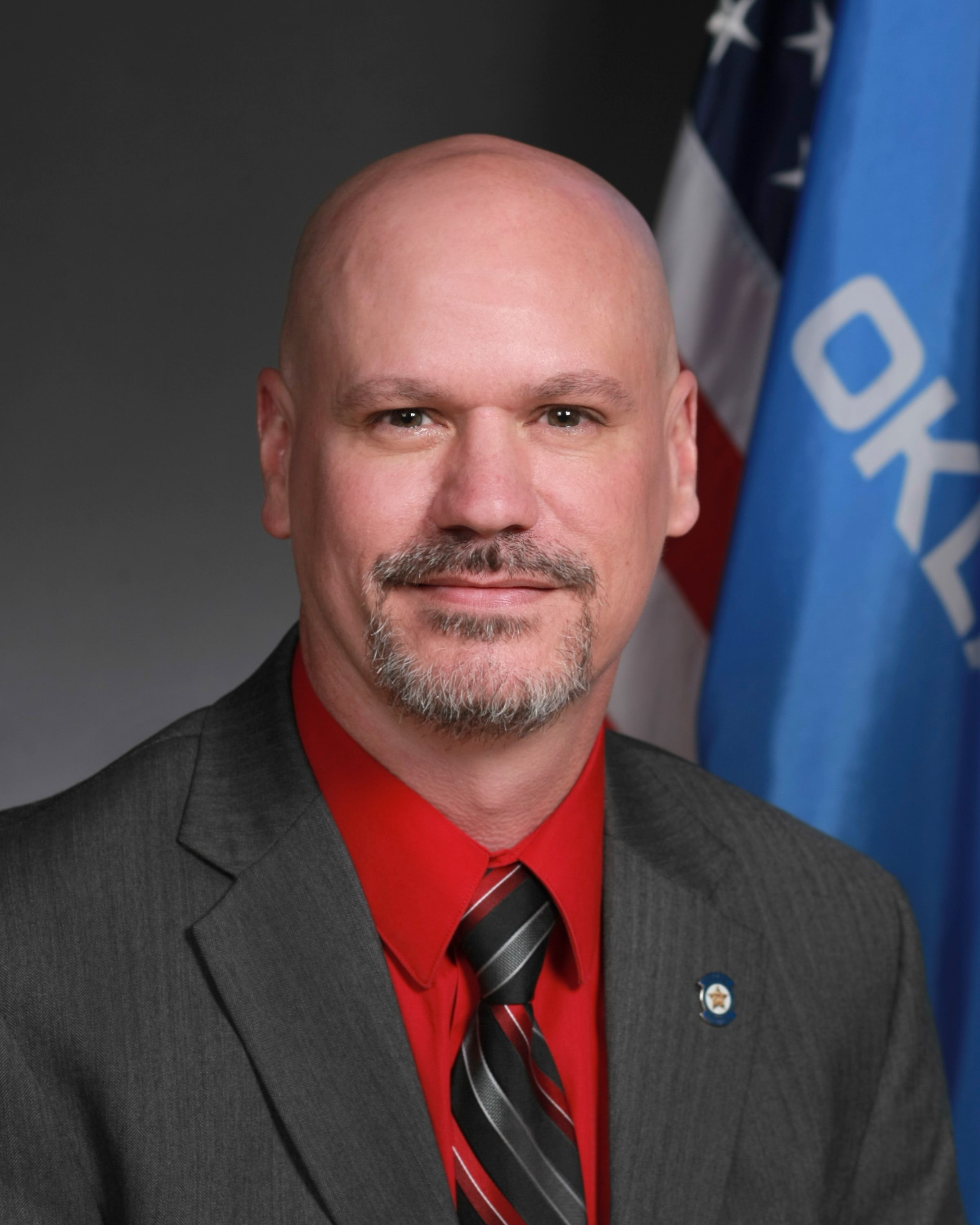

Candidate	Kevin West	Kevin Dawson
Party	Republican	Democratic
Popular vote	620,848	436,655
Percentage	55.9%	39.3%
- West: 40–50% 50–60% 60–70% 70–80% 80–90% >90% Dawson: 40–50% 50–60% 60–70% 70–80% 80–90% >90% Tie: 50% No votes
Labor Commissioner before election
Leslie Osborn
Independent
Elected Labor Commissioner
Kevin West
Republican

The 2026 Oklahoma Labor Commissioner election was held on November 3, 2026, to elect the Oklahoma Labor Commissioner. Incumbent independent Labor Commissioner Leslie Osborn was term-limited and ineligible to run for re-election. Republican candidate Kevin West was elected, defeating Democratic candidate Kevin Dawson.

Primary elections were held on June 16. Dawson won the Democratic primary uncontested; while West was challenged by fellow Oklahoma House of Representatives member John Pfeiffer.

== Republican primary ==
=== Candidates ===
==== Nominee ====
- Kevin West, state representative from the 54th district (2017–present)

==== Eliminated in runoff ====
- John Pfeiffer, state representative from the 38th district (2019–present)

==== Eliminated in primary ====
- Lisa Mahmood Janloo, small business owner and candidate for Oklahoma's 97th state house district in 2022
- Keith Swinton, mechanical engineer and candidate for commissioner of labor in 2018 and 2022

=== First round ===
==== Results ====
Primary results by county: West: 30–40%; 40–50%; 50–60%; 60–70%; Pfeiffer: 30–40%; 40–50%; 50–60%; 60–70%

Republican primary results
Party	Candidate	Votes	%
Republican	Kevin West	153,384	41.8
Republican	John Pfeiffer	129,482	35.3
Republican	Lisa Mahmood Janloo	53,269	14.5
Republican	Keith Swinton	30,952	8.4
Total votes		367,087	100.0

=== Runoff ===
==== Polling ====
Poll source	Date(s) administered	Sample size (Note: Key: A – all adults RV – registered voters LV – likely voters V – unclear)	Margin of error	John Pfeiffer	Kevin West	Undecided
Cole Hargrave Snodgrass & Associates	August 3–6, 2026	600 (LV)	± 4.0%	25%	27%	48%

==== Results ====
Runoff results by county: West: 50–60%; 60–70%; 70–80%; Pfeiffer: 50–60%; 60–70%; 70–80%

Republican primary runoff results
Party	Candidate	Votes	%
Republican	Kevin West	204,001	58.3
Republican	John Pfeiffer	146,014	41.7
Total votes		350,015	100.0

== Democratic primary ==
=== Candidates ===
==== Nominee ====
- Kevin Dawson, engineer

== Third-party and independent candidates ==
=== Candidates ===
==== Nominee ====
- Mike Hall (Libertarian)

== General election ==
=== Endorsements ===
Kevin Dawson (D)

U.S. Representatives

- Beto O'Rourke, former representative for Texas's 16th congressional district

Statewide officials

- Christina Stephenson, Oregon Commissioner of Labor

=== Results ===
2026 Oklahoma Labor Commissioner election
Party	Candidate	Votes	%	±%
Republican	Kevin West	620,848	55.89	−9.77
Democratic	Kevin Dawson	436,655	39.31	+9.98
Libertarian	Mike Hall	53,364	4.80	−0.21
Total votes		1,110,867	100.0	
Republican gain from Independent				
