= 2026 Louisiana Public Service Commission election =

- November 3, 2026

2 of 5 seats on the Louisiana Public Service Commission 3 seats needed for a majority
	First party	Second party
Party	Republican	Democratic
Seats before	3	2
Seats after	4	1
Seat change	▲1	▼1

The 2026 Louisiana Public Service Commission election was held on November 3, 2026, to elect 2 of 5 members to the Louisiana Public Service Commission. Primary elections were held on May 16 and primary runoff elections were held on June 27 in races where no candidate received 50% of the vote.

== District 1 ==
District 1 covers St. Tammany, Washington, St. Bernard, Plaquemines, St. Helena and Tangipahoa parishes, together with parts of Jefferson, Orleans, Livingston and St. Charles parishes. Republican incumbent Eric Skrmetta, the commission's chairman, was first elected in 2008 and was ineligible to run again under the commission's term limits. The 2026 election was the first for the commission held under Louisiana's closed party primary system, in which Republican and Democratic nominees were chosen in party primaries on May 16 with runoffs on June 27, and the general election was held on November 3, 2026.

=== Republican primary ===
Five candidates sought the Republican nomination: state representative Stephanie Hilferty of Metairie, former Jefferson Parish councilman John Young, state representative Mark Wright of Covington, Wallace "Wayne" Cooper II, and John Mason. No candidate received a majority on May 16, and Young and Hilferty advanced to a June 27 runoff.

==== Results ====
Republican primary results
Party	Candidate	Votes	%
Republican	John Young	29,801	31.24
Republican	Stephanie Hilferty	26,500	27.78
Republican	Mark Wright	22,791	23.89
Republican	Wallace Cooper II	9,485	9.94
Republican	John Mason	6,819	7.15
Total votes		95,396	100.00

==== Runoff ====
In the runoff Hilferty, who had finished second in the primary, defeated Young with 62.5% of the vote, carrying every parish in the district. Hilferty had been endorsed by a number of statewide officials and parish officials within the district, and campaigned on reducing bureaucracy at the commission and requiring greater transparency from regulated utilities.

===== Results =====
Republican primary runoff results
Party	Candidate	Votes	%
Republican	Stephanie Hilferty	49,047	62.47
Republican	John Young	29,459	37.53
Total votes		78,506	100.00

=== Democratic primary ===
Connie Norris, a retired teacher from Slidell, was the only Democrat to qualify and was nominated without a primary.

=== General election ===
The general election was contested by Hilferty, Norris, and Chris Justin, who qualified without party affiliation and therefore did not take part in the closed primaries. The campaign took place as the commission considered grid connections and new natural gas generation for large data centers, including a pending vote on additional gas plants to serve a data center in Richland Parish, and the effect of those projects on residential rates was a central issue.

Hilferty was elected on November 3, 2026, with 58.9% of the vote, a majority in the three-candidate field, defeating Norris by about 93,000 votes. She carried nine of the district's ten parishes, losing only St. Helena Parish to Norris, and finished first in Orleans Parish, where Democrats hold a large registration advantage. Her result came in an election in which Republican candidates statewide ran well behind their 2024 performance; Republican Julia Letlow won the state's U.S. Senate race by under two percentage points on the same ballot.

==== Results ====
2026 Louisiana Public Service Commission election, district 1
Party	Candidate	Votes	%
Republican	Stephanie Hilferty	176,505	58.88
Democratic	Connie Norris	83,259	27.78
Independent	Chris Justin	39,984	13.34
Total votes		299,748	100.00

==== Results by parish ====
Parish	Hilferty	%	Norris	%	Justin	%	Total
St. Tammany	61,042	60.5	25,320	25.1	14,537	14.4	100,899
Jefferson (part)	50,617	58.9	25,010	29.1	10,307	12.0	85,934
Tangipahoa	22,084	57.3	11,562	30.0	4,895	12.8	38,541
Livingston (part)	13,314	73.7	2,601	14.4	2,151	11.8	18,066
Orleans (part)	7,320	45.4	5,047	31.3	3,757	23.3	16,124
Washington	7,015	55.8	4,023	32.0	1,535	12.2	12,573
St. Bernard	5,662	50.1	4,430	39.2	1,209	10.8	11,301
Plaquemines	4,530	59.9	2,368	31.3	665	8.8	7,563
St. Charles (part)	3,201	72.6	778	17.6	430	9.8	4,409
St. Helena	1,758	40.5	2,095	48.3	485	11.2	4,338
Total	176,505	58.9	83,259	27.8	39,984	13.3	299,748

== District 5 ==
=== Democratic primary ===
==== Candidates ====
===== Nominee =====
- James Green, Shreveport city councilor

===== Eliminated in primary =====
- Austin Lawson, restaurant worker

===== Declined =====
- Foster Campbell, incumbent commissioner

==== Results ====
Democratic primary results
Party	Candidate	Votes	%
Democratic	James Green	44,078	76.2
Democratic	Austin Lawson	13,735	23.8
Total votes		57,813	100.0

=== Republican primary ===
==== Candidates ====
===== Nominee =====
- John Atkins, Caddo Parish commissioner

===== Eliminated in primary =====
- Aiden Joyner, political science student

==== Results ====
Republican primary results
Party	Candidate	Votes	%
Republican	John Atkins	67,436	88.4
Republican	Aiden Joyner	8,878	11.6
Total votes		76,314	100.0

=== General election ===
==== Results ====
2026 Louisiana Public Service Commission election, district 5
Party	Candidate	Votes	%
Republican	John Atkins	161,038	59.16
Democratic	James Green	111,188	40.84
Total votes		272,226	100.00
