= 2026 Kansas Insurance Commissioner election =

- November 3, 2026

Nominee	Daniel Hawkins	Dinah Sykes
Party	Republican	Democratic
Popular vote	529,858	512,335
Percentage	48.99%	47.37%
Insurance Commissioner before election
Vicki Schmidt
Republican
Elected Insurance Commissioner
Daniel Hawkins
Republican

The 2026 Kansas Insurance Commissioner election was held on November 3, 2026, to elect the Kansas Insurance Commissioner. The Incumbent Republican commissioner Vicki Schmidt decided to retire to run for governor and not seek a third-term. Republican nominee Daniel Hawkins narrowly won the election against Democratic nominee Dinah Sykes. Both candidates had previously served as their respective party leaders in the Kansas State Legislature, with Hawkins in the House of Representatives and Sykes in the Senate.

Primary elections were held on August 4. In the primaries; both major party nominees were uncontested.

== Republican primary ==
=== Candidates ===
==== Nominee ====
- Daniel Hawkins, speaker of the Kansas House of Representatives (2023–present) from the 100th district (2013–present)

==== Declined ====
- Vicki Schmidt, incumbent insurance commissioner (ran for governor)

=== Results ===
Republican primary results
Party	Candidate	Votes	%
Republican	Daniel Hawkins	272,016	100.0
Total votes		272,016	100.0

== Democratic primary ==
=== Candidates ===
==== Nominee ====
- Dinah Sykes, minority leader of the Kansas Senate (2021–present) from the 21st district (2017–present)

=== Results ===
Democratic primary results
Party	Candidate	Votes	%
Democratic	Dinah Sykes	194,563	100.0
Total votes		194,563	100.0

== Third-party and independent candidates ==
=== Declared ===
- Ric Koehn (Libertarian)

== General election ==
=== Results ===
2026 Kansas Insurance Commissioner election results
Party	Candidate	Votes	%	±%
Republican	Daniel Hawkins	529,858	48.99	−14.02
Democratic	Dinah Sykes	512,335	47.37	+10.38
Libertarian Party of Kansas	Ric Koehn	39,401	3.64	N/A
Total votes		1,081,594	100.00	
