= 2027 Kentucky elections =

A general election will be held in the U.S. state of Kentucky on November 2, 2027. The primary election for all offices will be held on May 18, 2027.

== Governor and lieutenant governor ==
Incumbent Democratic governor Andy Beshear is term-limited and ineligible for reelection.

== Secretary of State ==
Incumbent Republican secretary of state Michael Adams is term-limited and ineligible for reelection.

== Attorney General ==
Incumbent Republican attorney general Russell Coleman was elected in 2023 and is eligible for reelection.

== Auditor of Public Accounts ==
Incumbent Republican auditor of public accounts Allison Ball was elected in 2023 and is eligible for reelection.

=== Republican primary ===
==== Candidates ====
===== Filed paperwork =====
- Allison Ball, incumbent auditor of public accounts

== State Treasurer ==
Incumbent Republican state treasurer Mark Metcalf was elected in 2023 and is eligible for reelection.

=== Republican primary ===
==== Candidates ====
===== Declared =====
- Mark Metcalf, incumbent state treasurer

== Commissioner of Agriculture ==
Incumbent Republican commissioner of agriculture Jonathan Shell was elected in 2023 and is eligible for reelection.

=== Republican primary ===
==== Candidates ====
===== Declared =====
- Jonathan Shell, incumbent commissioner of agriculture

== See also ==
- Elections in Kentucky
- Politics of Kentucky
- Political party strength in Kentucky
