= 2026 Nevada State Board of Regents election =

- November 3, 2026

The 2026 Nevada State Board of Regents election was held on November 3, 2026, to elect five of 13 seats to the Nevada State Board of Regents. In districts where more than two candidates filed, a nonpartisan primary election was held on June 9.

== District 2 ==
=== Primary election ===
==== Candidates ====
===== Advanced to general =====
- Jennifer McGrath, governor appointed board member (since 2025)
- Patrick Villa, professor of mathematics at the College of Southern Nevada

===== Eliminated in primary =====
- Hunter Cain, perennial candidate
- Dylan Chambers, salesman

==== Results ====
Nonpartisan primary
Candidate	Votes	%
Jennifer McGrath (incumbent)	10,513	48.7
Patrick Villa	5,346	24.8
Hunter Cain	3,414	15.8
Dylan Chambers	2,300	10.7
Total votes	21,573	100.0

== District 3 ==
=== Primary election ===
==== Candidates ====
===== Advanced to general =====
- Byron Brooks, incumbent board member
- Erik Swendseid, architect

===== Withdrawn =====
- Brian Brill, school principal

== District 5 ==
=== Primary election ===
==== Candidates ====
===== Advanced to general =====
- Mo Denis, former Democratic state senator from the 2nd district (2010–2022)
- Stephanie Molina, professor at the University of Nevada, Las Vegas

===== Eliminated in primary =====
- Patrick Boylan, incumbent board member
- Kathleen Cavalaro
- Tyler DeLorenzo
- Ashley Garcia

==== Results ====
Nonpartisan primary
Candidate	Votes	%
Mo Denis	3,419	29.7
Stephanie Molina	2,257	19.6
Ashley Garcia	1,864	16.2
Patrick Boyland (incumbent)	1,750	15.2
Kathleen Cavalaro	1,576	13.7
Tyler DeLorenzo	660	5.7
Total votes	11,526	100.0

== District 8 (special) ==
=== Primary election ===
==== Candidates ====
===== Advanced to general =====
- Peter Goicoechea, incumbent board member
- Lori Lane, entertainment professional

===== Eliminated in primary =====
- Karmen La'Shaun Miller, school administrator
- Kirk Talib-deen, professor at the University of Nevada, Las Vegas

==== Results ====
Nonpartisan primary
Candidate	Votes	%
Peter Goicoechea (incumbent)	18,054	49.7
Lori Lane	10,947	30.1
Karmen La'Shaun Miller	4,911	13.5
Kirk Talib-deen	2,404	6.6
Total votes	36,316	100.0

== District 10 ==
=== Candidates ===
==== Advanced to general ====
- Joseph Arrascada, incumbent board member
- Peter Reed, professor at the University of Nevada, Reno
