= 2026 Oklahoma Corporation Commission election =

- November 3, 2026
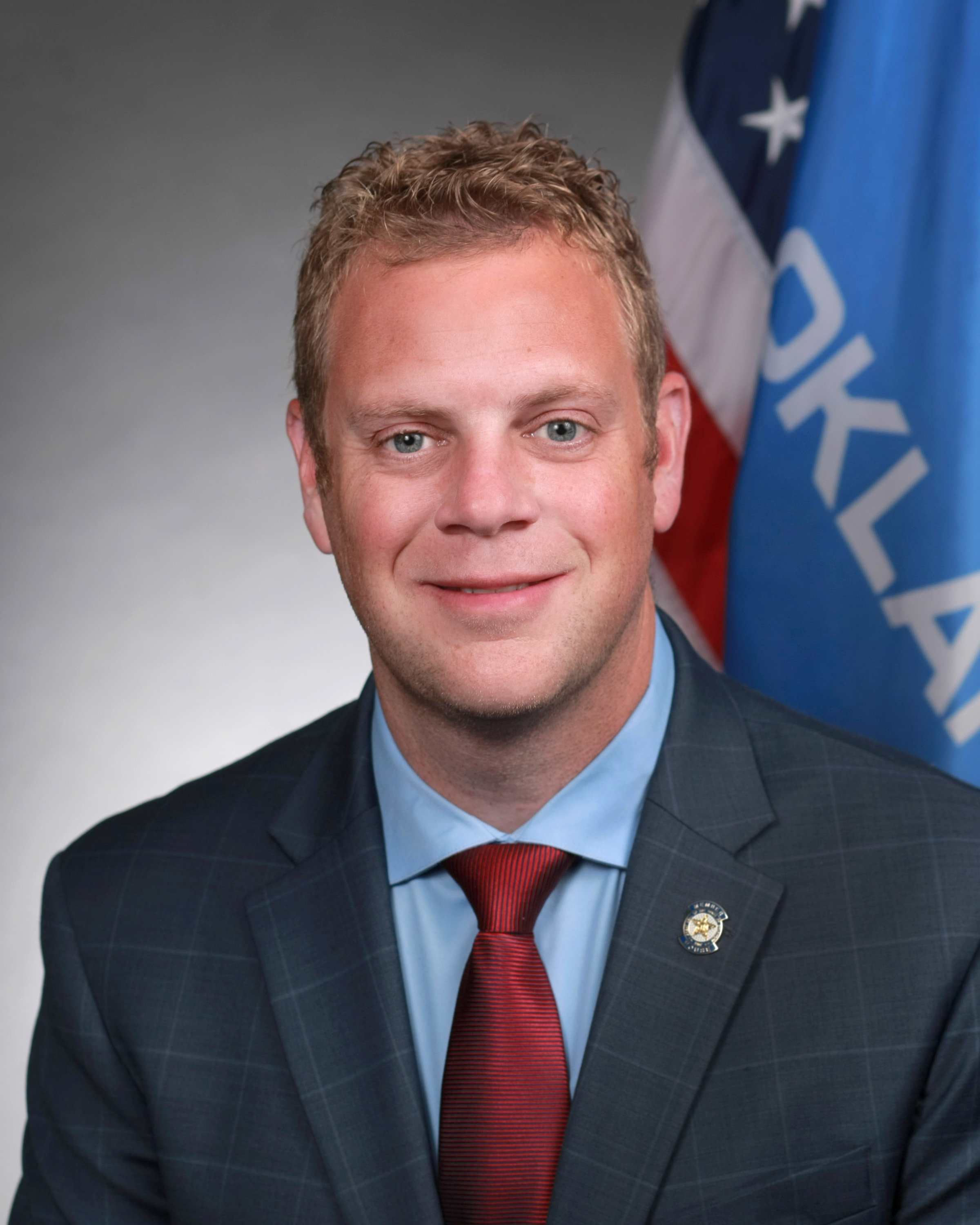

Candidate	Brad Boles	Rhonda Eastman
Party	Republican	Democratic
Popular vote	647,395	460,830
Percentage	58.4%	41.6%
- Boles: 50–60% 60–70% 70–80% 80–90% >90% Eastman: 50–60% 60–70% 70–80% 80–90% >90% Tie: 50% No votes
commissioner before election
Todd Hiett
Republican
Elected commissioner
Brad Boles
Republican

The 2026 Oklahoma Corporation Commission election was held on November 3, 2026, to elect one of three members to the Oklahoma Corporation Commission. Primary elections were held on June 16. Incumbent commissioner Todd Hiett was term-limited and ineligible to run for re-election.

== Republican primary ==
=== Candidates ===
==== Nominee ====
- Brad Boles, state representative for the 51st district (2018–present)

==== Eliminated in primary ====
- Justin Hornback, representative for the Pipeliners Union 798 and candidate for Corporation Commissioner in 2022 and 2024

=== Results ===
Primary results by county: Boles: 50–60%; 60–70%; 80–90%; Hornback: 50–60%

Republican primary results
Party	Candidate	Votes	%
Republican	Brad Boles	200,025	55.3
Republican	Justin Hornback	161,851	44.7
Total votes		361,876	100.0

== Democratic primary ==
=== Candidates ===
==== Nominee ====
- Rhonda Eastman, businesswoman

==== Eliminated in primary ====
- Donald Clytus, consulting firm director
- Harold Spradling, perennial candidate

=== Results ===
Primary results by county: Eastman: 40–50%; 50–60%; 60–70%; 70–80%; Spradling: 40–50%; Tie: 30–40%

Democratic primary results
Party	Candidate	Votes	%
Democratic	Rhonda Eastman	116,858	70.0
Democratic	Harold Spradling	33,542	20.1
Democratic	Donald Clytus	16,538	9.9
Total votes		166,938	100.0

== Results ==
2026 Oklahoma Corporation Commissioner election
Party	Candidate	Votes	%
Republican	Brad Boles	647,395	58.42
Democratic	Rhonda Eastman	460,830	41.58
Total votes		1,108,225	100.0
Republican hold			
