= 2026 Oklahoma Insurance Commissioner election =

- November 3, 2026
| Candidate | Bob Sullivan | Craig MacIntyre |
| Party | Republican | Democratic |
| Popular vote | 656,019 | 454,436 |
| Percentage | 59.1% | 40.9% |
- Sullivan: 50–60% 60–70% 70–80% 80–90% >90% MacIntyre: 50–60% 60–70% 70–80% 80–90% >90% Tie: 50% No votes
Insurance Commissioner before election
Glen Mulready
Republican
Elected Insurance Commissioner
Bob Sullivan
Republican

The 2026 Oklahoma Insurance Commissioner election was held on November 3, 2026, to elect the Oklahoma Insurance Commissioner. Primary elections was held on June 16. Incumbent Insurance Commissioner Glen Mulready was term-limited and ineligible to run for re-election.

== Republican primary ==
=== Candidates ===
==== Nominee ====
- Bob Sullivan, risk manager

==== Eliminated in runoff ====
- Marty Quinn, former state senator from the 2nd district (2014–2022) and candidate for Oklahoma's 2nd congressional district in 2022

==== Eliminated in primary ====
- Chris Merideth, insurance executive
- Greta Shuler, Shawnee councilmember

=== First round ===
==== Results ====
Primary results by county: Sullivan: 30–40%; 40–50%; Quinn: 30–40%; 40–50%

Republican primary results
| Party | Candidate | Votes | % |
|---|---|---|---|
| Republican | Bob Sullivan | 137,366 | 37.4 |
| Republican | Marty Quinn | 101,755 | 27.7 |
| Republican | Greta Shuler | 64,582 | 17.6 |
| Republican | Chris Merideth | 63,872 | 17.4 |
| Total votes | | 367,575 | 100.0 |

=== Runoff ===
==== Polling ====
| Poll source | Date(s) administered | Sample size (Note: Key: A – all adults RV – registered voters LV – likely voters V – unclear) | Margin of error | Marty Quinn | Bob Sullivan | Undecided |
|---|---|---|---|---|---|---|
| Cole Hargrave Snodgrass & Associates | August 3–6, 2026 | 600 (LV) | ± 4.0% | 26% | 30% | 44% |

==== Results ====
Runoff results by county: Sullivan: 50–60%; 60–70%; Quinn: 50–60%; 60–70%

Republican primary runoff results
| Party | Candidate | Votes | % |
|---|---|---|---|
| Republican | Bob Sullivan | 194,975 | 55.1 |
| Republican | Marty Quinn | 158,672 | 44.9 |
| Total votes | | 353,647 | 100.0 |

== Democratic primary ==
=== Candidates ===
==== Nominee ====
- Craig MacIntyre, executive

== Results ==
2026 Oklahoma Insurance Commissioner election
| Party | Candidate | Votes | % |
|---|---|---|---|
| Republican | Bob Sullivan | 656,019 | 59.08 |
| Democratic | Craig MacIntyre | 454,436 | 40.92 |
| Total votes | | 1,110,455 | 100.0 |
| Republican hold | | | |
