= Bob Sullivan (politician) =

Newly elected state official

Insurance Commissioner of Oklahoma
- Elect
- Assuming office January 2027
- Governor: Mike Mazzei (elect)
- Succeeding: Glen Mulready

Personal details
- Born: 1984 or 1985 (age 41–42)
- Party: Republican
- Education: Oklahoma State University, Stillwater (BS)

Bob Sullivan (born 1984/1985) is an American politician who is the Insurance Commissioner of Oklahoma-elect since the 2026 election. He is a member of the Republican Party.

Political offices
Preceded by Glen Mulready	Insurance Commissioner of Oklahoma; Taking office 2027	Elect
