= 2026 Texas State Board of Education election =

- November 3, 2026

8 of 15 seats on the Texas State Board of Education 8 seats needed for a majority
	First party	Second party
Party	Democratic	Republican
Last election	5	10
Seats before	4	11
Seats after	8	7
Seat change	▲4	▼4
- Results of the election: Democratic hold Democratic gain Republican hold No election

The 2026 Texas State Board of Education election was held on November 3, 2026, to elect eight members to the Texas State Board of Education. Primary elections were held on March 3, and primary runoff elections were held on May 26 in races where no candidate received a majority of the vote.

Democrats gained 4 seats, retaking the majority for the first time since 1994.

== District 2 ==
=== Republican primary ===
==== Candidates ====
===== Nominee =====
- Victoria Hinojosa, businesswoman and wife of state senator Adam Hinojosa

===== Eliminated in primary =====
- LJ Francis, incumbent board member
- Carrie Moore

==== Results ====
Republican primary
Party	Candidate	Votes	%
Republican	Victoria Hinojosa	46,782	59.0
Republican	Carrie Moore	21,692	27.3
Republican	LJ Francis (incumbent)	10,830	13.7
Total votes		79,304	100.0

=== Democratic primary ===
==== Candidates ====
===== Nominee =====
- Thomas Garcia, professor

==== Results ====
Democratic primary
Party	Candidate	Votes	%
Democratic	Thomas Garcia	107,654	100.0
Total votes		107,654	100.0

=== General election ===
==== Results ====
2026 Texas Board of Education 2nd district election
Party	Candidate	Votes	%
Democratic	Thomas Garcia	286,339	58.16
Republican	Victoria Hinojosa	205,966	41.84
Total votes		492,305	100.00

== District 4 (special) ==
Democrat Staci Childs resigned from her seat to run for Texas House. Governor Greg Abbott appointed Republican Tammie Nielsen to fill the seat. Nielsen will face Democrat Coretta Mallet-Fontenot in a special election to fill the remainder of Childs' unexpired term.

2026 Texas Board of Education 4th district special election
Party	Candidate	Votes	%
Democratic	Coretta Mallet-Fontenot	357,586	78.48
Republican	Tammie Nielsen (incumbent)	98,058	21.52
Total votes		455,644	100.00

== District 5 ==
=== Democratic primary ===
==== Candidates ====
===== Nominee =====
- Allison Bush, businesswoman

===== Eliminated in runoff =====
- Stephanie Bazan, executive director and candidate for Austin City Council in 2022

===== Eliminated in primary =====
- Abigail Gray, graduate research assistant
- Kevin Jackson, educator
- Neto Longoria, canvasser
- Victor Sampson, business owner

===== Declined =====
- Rebecca Bell-Metereau, incumbent board member

==== Results ====
Democratic primary
Party	Candidate	Votes	%
Democratic	Allison Bush	83,648	35.5
Democratic	Stephanie Bazan	49,407	21.0
Democratic	Abigail Gray	32,394	13.8
Democratic	Kevin Jackson	32,185	13.7
Democratic	Neto Longoria	25,156	10.7
Democratic	Victor Sampson	12,455	5.3
Total votes		235,245	100.0

Democratic primary runoff
Party	Candidate	Votes	%
Democratic	Allison Bush	43,022	61.2
Democratic	Stephanie Bazan	27,427	38.8
Total votes		70,629	100.0

=== Republican primary ===
==== Candidates ====
===== Nominee =====
- Mica Arellano, client advocate

==== Results ====
Republican primary
Party	Candidate	Votes	%
Republican	Mica Arellano	78,523	100.0
Total votes		78,523	100.0

=== General election ===
==== Results ====
2026 Texas Board of Education 5th district election
Party	Candidate	Votes	%
Democratic	Allison Bush	554,203	69.69
Republican	Mica Arellano	241,078	30.31
Total votes		795,281	100.00

== District 6 ==
=== Republican primary ===
==== Candidates ====
===== Nominee =====
- Tiffany Nelson, consultant

===== Eliminated in primary =====
- Barbara Denson, retiree

===== Declined =====
- Will Hickman, incumbent board member

==== Results ====
Republican primary
Party	Candidate	Votes	%
Republican	Tiffany Nelson	85,337	64.8
Republican	Barbara Denson	46,436	35.2
Total votes		131,773	100.0

=== Democratic primary ===
==== Candidates ====
===== Nominee =====
- Michelle Palmer, teacher and nominee in 2022

==== Results ====
Democratic primary
Party	Candidate	Votes	%
Democratic	Michelle Palmer	123,979	100.0
Total votes		123,979	100.0

=== General election ===
==== Results ====
2026 Texas Board of Education 6th district election
Party	Candidate	Votes	%
Democratic	Michelle Palmer	363,994	50.69
Republican	Tiffany Nelson	354,040	49.30
Independent	Margo Jordan (write-in)	96	0.01
Total votes		718,130	100.00

== District 7 ==
=== Republican primary ===
==== Candidates ====
===== Nominee =====
- Julie Pickren, incumbent board member

==== Results ====
Republican primary
Party	Candidate	Votes	%
Republican	Julie Pickren (incumbent)	132,216	100.0
Total votes		132,216	100.0

=== Democratic primary ===
==== Candidates ====
===== Nominee =====
- Tiffany Perkinz, educator

===== Eliminated in runoff =====
- Debra Ambriose, retiree

===== Eliminated in primary =====
- Janell Burse, business manager
- Ben Estrada, IT analyst
- Adam Khan, teacher

==== Results ====
Democratic primary
Party	Candidate	Votes	%
Democratic	Tiffany Perkinz	40,096	31.3
Democratic	Debra Ambriose	33,505	26.2
Democratic	Janell Burse	22,355	17.5
Democratic	Ben Estrada	19,918	15.5
Democratic	Adam Khan	12,142	9.5
Total votes		128,016	100.0

Democratic primary runoff
Party	Candidate	Votes	%
Democratic	Tiffany Perkinz	21,304	50.7
Democratic	Debra Ambriose	20,733	49.3
Total votes		42,037	100.0

=== General election ===
==== Results ====
2026 Texas Board of Education 7th district election
Party	Candidate	Votes	%
Republican	Julie Pickren (incumbent)	362,554	51.36
Democratic	Tiffany Perkinz	343,370	48.64
Total votes		705,924	100.00

== District 8 ==
=== Republican primary ===
==== Candidates ====
===== Nominee =====
- Audrey Young, incumbent board member

===== Eliminated in primary =====
- George Vachris, retiree and candidate for Texas Senate in 2022

==== Results ====
Republican primary
Party	Candidate	Votes	%
Republican	Audrey Young (incumbent)	77,643	69.3
Republican	George Vachris	34,443	30.7
Total votes		112,086	100.0

=== Democratic primary ===
==== Candidates ====
===== Nominee =====
- Dana Van De Walker, educational administrator

===== Eliminated in primary =====
- Shahzeb Meghani, software engineer

==== Results ====
Democratic primary
Party	Candidate	Votes	%
Democratic	Dana Van De Walker	72,868	71.9
Democratic	Shahzeb Meghani	30,084	29.1
Total votes		102,952	100.0

=== General election ===
==== Results ====
2026 Texas Board of Education 8th district election
Party	Candidate	Votes	%
Democratic	Dana Van De Walker	300,108	50.05
Republican	Audrey Young (incumbent)	299,544	49.95
Total votes		599,652	100.00

== District 9 ==
=== Republican primary ===
==== Candidates ====
===== Nominee =====
- Kason Huddleston, minister

===== Eliminated in primary =====
- Rachel Hogue, educator
- Stephen Yearout, technology director

===== Declined =====
- Keven Ellis, incumbent board member

==== Results ====
Republican primary
Party	Candidate	Votes	%
Republican	Kason Huddleston	97,567	58.4
Republican	Rachel Hogue	44,736	26.8
Republican	Stephen Yearout	24,731	14.8
Total votes		167,034	100.0

=== Democratic primary ===
==== Candidates ====
===== Nominee =====
- Ericka Ledford, business owner

==== Results ====
Democratic primary
Party	Candidate	Votes	%
Democratic	Ericka Ledford	109,807	100.0
Total votes		109,807	100.0

=== General election ===
==== Results ====
2026 Texas Board of Education 9th district election
Party	Candidate	Votes	%
Republican	Kason Huddleston	389,579	57.96
Democratic	Ericka Ledford	282,562	42.04
Total votes		672,141	100.00

== District 13 ==
=== Democratic primary ===
==== Candidates ====
===== Nominee =====
- Tiffany Clark, incumbent board member

===== Eliminated in primary =====
- Kimberly Boswell, assistant principal

==== Results ====
Democratic primary
Party	Candidate	Votes	%
Democratic	Tiffany Clark (incumbent)	135,286	71.2
Democratic	Kimberly Boswell	54,699	28.8
Total votes		189,985	100.0

=== Republican primary ===
==== Candidates ====
===== Nominee =====
- April Williams Moore, realtor

==== Results ====
Republican primary
Party	Candidate	Votes	%
Republican	April Williams Moore	32,354	100.0
Total votes		32,354	100.0

=== General election ===
==== Results ====
2026 Texas Board of Education 13th district election
Party	Candidate	Votes	%
Democratic	Tiffany Clark (incumbent)	397,111	79.01
Republican	Charlie Garza	105,504	20.99
Total votes		502,615	100.00

== District 14 ==
=== Republican primary ===
==== Candidates ====
===== Nominee =====
- Mindy Bumgarner, operations executive and wife of state representative Ben Bumgarner

===== Withdrawn =====
- Christine Malaguti, business executive

===== Declined =====
- Evelyn Brooks, incumbent board member (running for governor)

==== Results ====
Republican primary
Party	Candidate	Votes	%
Republican	Mindy Bumgarner	153,047	100.0
Total votes		153,047	100.0

=== Democratic primary ===
==== Candidates ====
===== Nominee =====
- Amy Taylor, teacher

==== Results ====
Democratic primary
Party	Candidate	Votes	%
Democratic	Amy Taylor	114,185	100.0
Total votes		114,185	100.0

=== General election ===
==== Results ====
2026 Texas Board of Education 14th district election
Party	Candidate	Votes	%
Republican	Mindy Bumgarner	411,255	55.65
Democratic	Amy Taylor	327,743	44.35
Total votes		738,998	100.00
