= Utah State Board of Education =

State education agency of Utah

Utah State Board of Education (USBE) is the state education agency of Utah. Its headquarters are in Salt Lake City.

== Purpose ==
The USBE is the governing body over education in the state of Utah. This organization issues teaching licenses and establishes the statewide K-12 school curriculum.

== Current Members ==
Board members are elected to staggered four-year terms by district, with elections becoming party partisan from 2020.

District	Name	Party	Start	Next Election
1	Jennie Earl	Republican	January 9, 2019	2026
2	Vacant		September 14, 2026	2026
3	Rod Hall	Republican	January 6, 2025	2028
4	LeAnn Wood	Republican	January 2, 2023	2026
5	Sarah Reale	Democratic	January 2, 2023	2026
6	Carol Lear	Democratic	January 2, 2023	2028
7	Erin Longacre	Republican	August 14, 2025 (appointed)	2026 (special)
8	Christina Boggess	Republican	January 2, 2023	2026 (retiring)
9	Amanda Bollinger	Republican	January 6, 2025	2028
10	Matt Hymas	Republican	January 2, 2023	2028
11	Cindy Davis	Republican	January 2, 2023	2026 (retiring)
12	Cole Kelley	Republican	January 6, 2025	2028
13	Randy Boothe	Republican	January 4, 2021	2028
14	Emily Green	Republican	January 2, 2023	2026 (retiring)
15	Joann Brinton	Republican	January 6, 2025	2028
