= New Mexico Public Education Department =

State agency that oversees public schools

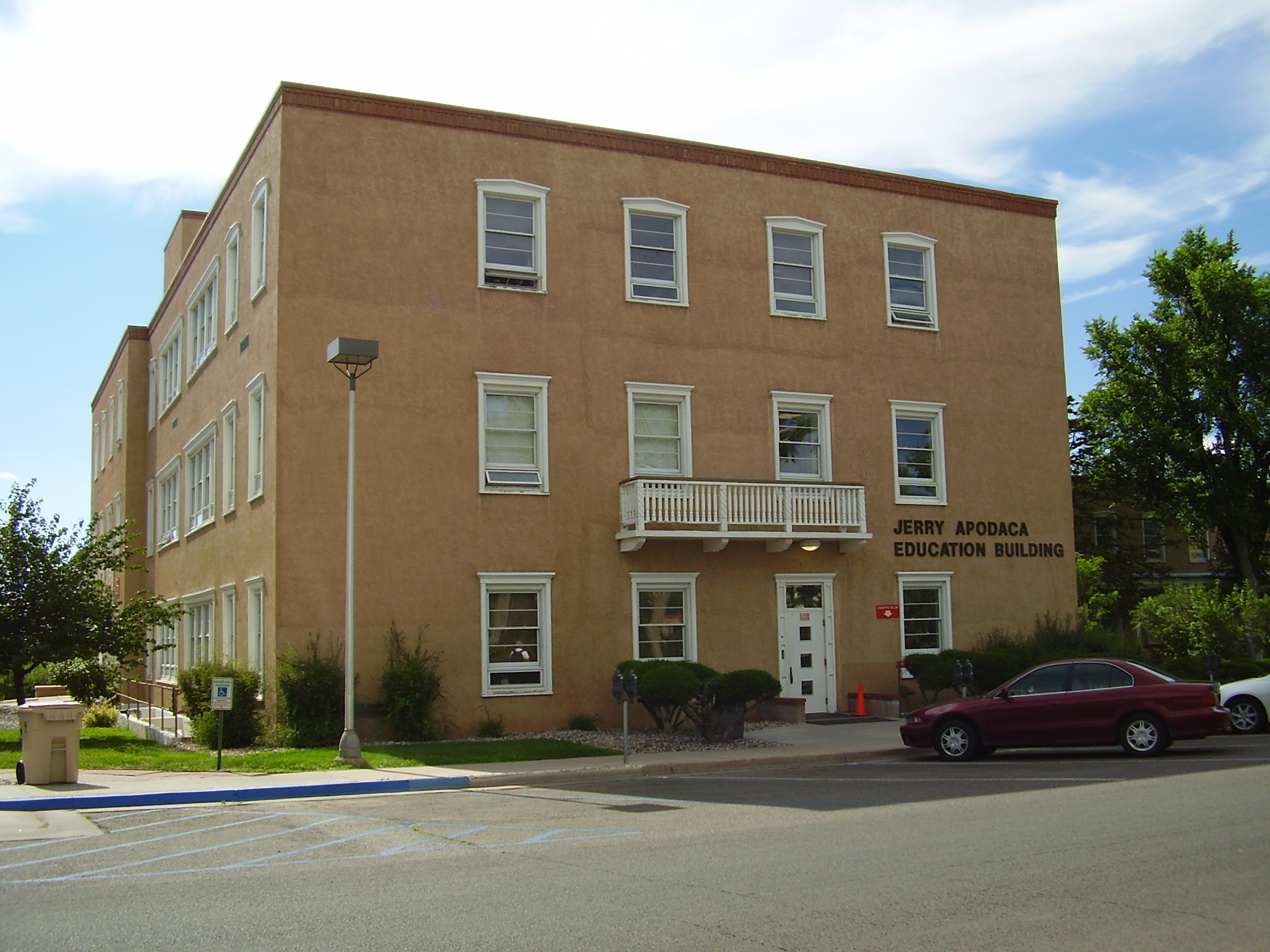
Jerry Apodaca Education Building, the headquarters of the department

New Mexico Public Education Department (NMPED, Spanish: Departamento de Educación Pública de Nuevo México) is the New Mexico state agency that oversees public schools. The agency is headquartered in the Jerry Apodaca Education Building in Santa Fe.

The Public Education Department was founded by the New Mexico Legislature as the Territorial Board of Education and Territorial Superintendent of Schools. In 1912, the State Board of Education and State Superintendent of Public Instruction were established.

== Members of the New Mexico Public Education Commission ==
District	Name	Party	Start	Next Election
1	Sam Obenshain	Democratic	January 1, 2025	2028
2	Timothy Beck	Republican	January 1, 2023	2026 (retiring)
3	Jacob Trujillo (appointed)	Democratic	June 22, 2026	2026
4	Rebekka Burt, Vice Chair	Democratic	January 1, 2021	2028
5	Sharon Clahchischilliage	Republican	January 1, 2023	2026
6	Stewart Ingham	Republican	January 1, 2023	2026
7	Patricia Gipson, Chair	Democratic	January 1, 2015	2026 (retiring)
8	Michael Taylor	Republican	January 1, 2021	2028
9	K. T. Manis	Republican	January 1, 2021	2028
10	Steven Carrillo, Secretary	Democratic	January 1, 2021	2028
