= Nebraska Department of Education =

U.S. state government agency

Agency overview
- Formed: 1875
- Jurisdiction: Nebraska
- Headquarters: Lincoln, Nebraska
- Employees: 505
- Agency executive: Brian L. Maher, Commissioner of Education

The Nebraska Department of Education (NDE) is a constitutional agency responsible for overseeing and administering the state's education system. It operates under the authority of the Nebraska State Board of Education, a nonpartisan elected body, and is led by the Nebraska Commissioner of Education, who is appointed by the Board.

== Structure and Governance ==
The NDE consists of two primary entities:

- The Nebraska State Board of Education, which serves as the policy-making body for the state's school system. The Board appoints the Commissioner, establishes educational policies, sets standards, and oversees various programs
- The Nebraska Commissioner of Education, who acts as the administrative head of the Department, advises the Board, oversees educational programs, and implements state and federal education laws

== State Board of Education ==
The Nebraska Superintendent of Public Instruction was established as a partisan elected office in 1869 and was added as a constitutional office in the 1875 Constitution. In 1917, the legislature made the elections for Superintendent nonpartisan, and in 1920, voters ratified a constitutional amendment extending the term of office to four years. Voters ratified another constitutional amendment in 1952 that created the State Board of Education as a nonpartisan elected body responsible for appointing the Superintendent. The first elections took place in 1954, with members elected from the districts used to elect members of the Nebraska Supreme Court. In the aftermath of the U.S. Supreme Court's one-person, one-vote decisions, the legislature drew new districts of equal population in 1967, and redrew the districts after every succeeding census.

The election is formally nonpartisan, with the party affiliations below reflecting known political history, candidate self-declaration, or state party support.

Nebraska State Board of Education Members
District	Name	Party	Start	Next Election
1	Kristin Christensen	Democratic	January 9, 2025	2028
2	Maggie Douglas	Democratic	January 9, 2025	2028
3	Lisa Schonhoff	Republican	January 9, 2025	2028
4	Liz Renner, vice president	Democratic	January 9, 2025	2028
5	Kirk Penner	Republican	December 23, 2021 (appointed)	2026 (retiring)
6	Sherry Jones	Republican	January 5, 2023	2026
7	Elizabeth Tegtmeier, president	Republican	January 5, 2023	2026
8	Deborah Neary	Democratic	January 1, 2019	2026 (retiring)

== Responsibilities ==
The NDE administers a wide range of programs and services, including:

- K-12 Education: Curriculum development, teacher certification, school accreditation, early childhood education, special education, school safety, and assessment programs
- Vocational Rehabilitation: Employment assistance and training for individuals with disabilities, with funding from both state and federal sources.
- Disability Determination Services: Evaluating eligibility for disability benefits under Social Security and Supplemental Security Income (SSI)
- Agency Operations: Administrative functions such as finance, human resources, legal services, and data management

The NDE works with public, private, and nonpublic schools, as well as institutions of higher education, to improve educational opportunities across the state.
