= 2022 United States secretary of state elections =

- November 8, 2022

27 secretary of state offices (Note: Seat tallies and popular vote do not include states that do not elect secretaries of state.)
	Majority party	Minority party
Party	Republican	Democratic
Seats before	20	15
Seats after	19	16
Seat change	▼1	▲1
- Democratic hold Democratic gain Republican hold Secretary of state not elected No election

The 2022 United States secretary of state elections were held on November 8, 2022, to elect the secretaries of state in twenty-seven states. These elections took place concurrently with several other federal, state, and local elections.

The elections for secretary of state had taken on heightened importance due to former President Donald Trump's baseless claims that the 2020 election was stolen. Many had argued that election officials such as secretaries of state could have the power to overturn the 2024 election, should its outcome be disagreeable to the losing candidate. As such, both parties are expending far more resources than in previous cycles on these races. A coalition of Republican candidates for secretary of state who have endorsed Trump's false claim that the 2020 election was stolen have organized under the America First Secretary of State Coalition slate.

The previous elections for this group of states took place in 2018. The secretary of state of Vermont serves two-year terms and was last elected in 2020. Additionally, there is a special election being held in Washington (secretary of state elections in Washington are regularly held in presidential election years) due to the resignation of Republican Kim Wyman to take a position in the administration of President Joe Biden.

== Partisan composition ==
Going into these elections, this class of secretaries of state is made up of 14 Republicans and 13 Democrats. Additionally, Democrats hold secretary of state offices in three states with Republican governors. By contrast, Republicans hold secretariat offices in two states with Democratic governors.

Going into the election, there were 27 Republican secretaries of state and 20 Democratic secretaries of state. 13 Democratic secretaries of state were up for election, of whom Nellie Gorbea of Rhode Island was term-limited and Katie Hobbs of Arizona, Mark Kohler of Connecticut, Jesse White of Illinois, and Jim Condos of Vermont were retiring. 14 Republican secretaries of state were up for election, of whom John Merrill of Alabama and Barbara Cegavske of Nevada were term-limited, while Lawerence Denney of Idaho, Alvin Jaeger of North Dakota, and Karl Allred of Wyoming were retiring.

Republicans defended one state won by Joe Biden in 2020 (Georgia), while Democrats do not hold any states won by Donald Trump. However, Democrats defended several seats in states Biden won only narrowly, including Arizona, Wisconsin, and Michigan. Furthermore, Democrats had a net gain of one seat in Nevada, another state narrowly won by Biden.

== Election predictions ==
Several sites and individuals published predictions of competitive seats. These predictions looked at factors such as the strength of the incumbent (if the incumbent is running for re-election), the strength of the candidates, and the partisan leanings of the state (reflected in part by the state's Cook Partisan Voting Index rating). The predictions assigned ratings to each seat, with the rating indicating the predicted advantage that a party has in winning that seat.

Most election predictors use:

- "tossup": no advantage
- "tilt" (used by some predictors): advantage that is not quite as strong as "lean"
- "lean": slight advantage
- "likely": significant, but surmountable, advantage
- "safe": near-certain chance of victory

State	PVI	Incumbent	Last race	Sabato Nov. 3, 2022	ED Nov. 7, 2022	Result
Alabama	R+15	John Merrill (term-limited)	61.0% R	Safe R	Safe R	Wes Allen
Arizona	R+3	Katie Hobbs (retiring)	50.4% D	Tossup	Leans D	Adrian Fontes
Arkansas	R+16	John Thurston	61.6% R	Safe R	Safe R	John Thurston
California	D+14	Shirley Weber	Appointed (2021) (Note: Democrat Alex Padilla won with 64.5% of the vote in 2018, but resigned on January 18, 2021 to become U.S. Senator.)	Safe D	Safe D	Shirley Weber
Colorado	D+3	Jena Griswold	52.7% D	Leans D	Leans D	Jena Griswold
Connecticut	D+7	Mark Kohler (retiring)	Appointed (2022) (Note: Democrat Denise Merrill won with 55.9% of the vote in 2018, but resigned on June 30, 2022.)	Safe D	Safe D	Stephanie Thomas
Georgia	R+3	Brad Raffensperger	51.89% R	Leans R	Leans R	Brad Raffensperger
Idaho	R+19	Lawerence Denney (retiring)	62.5% R	Safe R	Safe R	Phil McGrane
Illinois	D+7	Jesse White (retiring)	68.3% D	Safe D	Safe D	Alexi Giannoulias
Indiana	R+11	Holli Sullivan (lost nomination)	Appointed (2021) (Note: Republican Connie Lawson won with 56.2% of the vote in 2018, but resigned on February 15, 2021.)	Tossup	Likely R	Diego Morales
Iowa	R+6	Paul Pate	52.7% R	Leans R	Safe R	Paul Pate
Kansas	R+11	Scott Schwab	52.6% R	Safe R	Safe R	Scott Schwab
Massachusetts	D+14	William F. Galvin	70.8% D	Safe D	Safe D	William F. Galvin
Michigan	R+1	Jocelyn Benson	52.9% D	Leans D	Likely D	Jocelyn Benson
Minnesota	D+1	Steve Simon	52.3% DFL	Leans D	Leans D	Steve Simon
Nebraska	R+13	Bob Evnen	60.6% R	Safe R	Safe R	Bob Evnen
Nevada	EVEN	Barbara Cegavske (term-limited)	48.9% R	Tossup	Leans D (flip)	Cisco Aguilar (flip)
New Mexico	D+3	Maggie Toulouse Oliver	57.8% D	Leans D	Likely D	Maggie Toulouse Oliver
North Dakota	R+20	Alvin Jaeger (retiring)	47.3% I (Note: Jaeger withdrew from the Republican primary after not receiving the party nomination, and instead successfully ran as an independent.)	Safe R	Safe R	Michael Howe
Ohio	R+6	Frank LaRose	50.7% R	Safe R	Safe R	Frank LaRose
Rhode Island	D+8	Nellie Gorbea (term-limited)	67.4% D	Safe D	Safe D	Gregg Amore
South Carolina	R+8	Mark Hammond	57.1% R	Safe R	Safe R	Mark Hammond
South Dakota	R+16	Steve Barnett (lost renomination)	65.2% R	Safe R	Safe R	Monae Johnson
Vermont	D+15	James C. Condos (retiring)	57.9% D	Safe D	Safe D	Sarah Copeland-Hanzas
Washington (special)	D+8	Steve Hobbs	Appointed (2021) (Note: Republican Kim Wyman won with 53.6% of the vote in 2020, but resigned on November 19, 2021.)	Leans D	Leans D	Steve Hobbs
Wisconsin	R+2	Doug La Follette	52.7% D	Tossup	Leans R (flip)	Doug La Follette
Wyoming	R+26	Karl Allred (retiring)	Appointed (2022) (Note: Republican Edward Buchanan won with 68.8% of the vote in 2018, but resigned on September 17, 2022.)	Safe R	Safe R	Chuck Gray

== Race summary ==
=== States ===
State	Secretary of state	Party	First elected	Status	Candidates
Alabama	John Merrill	Republican	2014	Incumbent term-limited. New secretary elected. Republican hold.	▌ ✓ Wes Allen (Republican) 65.9%; ▌Pamela Laffitte (Democratic) 31.1%; ▌Matt Shelby (Libertarian) 3.0%
Arizona	Katie Hobbs	Democratic	2018	Incumbent retired to run for governor of Arizona. New secretary elected. Democratic hold.	▌ ✓ Adrian Fontes (Democratic) 52.4%; ▌Mark Finchem (Republican) 47.6%
Arkansas	John Thurston	Republican	2018	Incumbent re-elected.	▌ ✓ John Thurston (Republican) 67.0%; ▌Anna Beth Gorman (Democratic) 33.0%
California	Shirley Weber	Democratic	2021 (Note: Weber took office after her predecessor (Alex Padilla) resigned.)	Interim appointee elected.	▌ ✓ Shirley Weber (Democratic) 60.1%; ▌Rob Bernosky (Republican) 39.9%
Colorado	Jena Griswold	Democratic	2018	Incumbent re-elected.	▌ ✓ Jena Griswold (Democratic) 55.1%; ▌Pam Anderson (Republican) 42.1%; Others: ▌Bennett Rutledge (Libertarian) 1.5%; ▌Amanda Campbell (Constitution) 0.7%; ▌Gary Swing (Unity) 0.5%; ▌Jan Kok (Approval Voting) 0.2%
Connecticut	Mark Kohler	Democratic	2022 (Note: Kohler took office after his predecessor (Denise Merrill) resigned.)	Interim appointee retired. New secretary elected. Democratic hold.	▌ ✓ Stephanie Thomas (Democratic) 55.2%; ▌Dominic Rapini (Republican) 42.7%; ▌Cynthia Jennings (Independent) 2.1%
Georgia	Brad Raffensperger	Republican	2018	Incumbent re-elected.	▌ ✓ Brad Raffensperger (Republican) 53.2%; ▌Bee Nguyen (Democratic) 44.0%; ▌Ted Metz (Libertarian) 2.8%
Idaho	Lawerence Denney	Republican	2014	Incumbent retired. New secretary elected. Republican hold.	▌ ✓ Phil McGrane (Republican) 72.5%; ▌Shawn Keenan (Democratic) 27.5%
Illinois	Jesse White	Democratic	1998	Incumbent retired. New secretary elected. Democratic hold.	▌ ✓ Alexi Giannoulias (Democratic) 53.8%; ▌Dan Brady (Republican) 44.1%; ▌Jon Stewart (Libertarian) 2.1%
Indiana	Holli Sullivan	Republican	2021 (Note: Sullivan took office after her predecessor (Connie Lawson) resigned.)	Interim appointee lost nomination. New secretary elected. Republican hold.	▌ ✓ Diego Morales (Republican) 54.1%; ▌Destiny Scott Wells (Democratic) 40.2%; ▌Jeff Maurer (Libertarian) 5.7%
Iowa	Paul Pate	Republican	2014	Incumbent re-elected.	▌ ✓ Paul Pate (Republican) 60.1%; ▌Joel Miller (Democratic) 39.9%
Kansas	Scott Schwab	Republican	2018	Incumbent re-elected.	▌ ✓ Scott Schwab (Republican) 58.5%; ▌Jeanna Repass (Democratic) 38.8%; ▌Cullene Lang (Libertarian) 2.8%
Massachusetts	William F. Galvin	Democratic	1994	Incumbent re-elected.	▌ ✓ William F. Galvin (Democratic) 67.5%; ▌Rayla Campbell (Republican) 29.6%; ▌Juan Sanchez (Green-Rainbow) 2.9%
Michigan	Jocelyn Benson	Democratic	2018	Incumbent re-elected.	▌ ✓ Jocelyn Benson (Democratic) 55.9%; ▌Kristina Karamo (Republican) 41.9%; Others: ▌Gregory Stempfle (Libertarian) 1.2%; ▌Christine Schwartz (U.S. Taxpayers) 0.6%; ▌Larry Hutchinson (Green) 0.4%
Minnesota	Steve Simon	DFL	2014	Incumbent re-elected.	▌ ✓ Steve Simon (DFL) 54.6%; ▌Kim Crockett (Republican) 45.4%
Nebraska	Bob Evnen	Republican	2018	Incumbent re-elected.	▌ ✓ Bob Evnen (Republican)
Nevada	Barbara Cegavske	Republican	2014	Incumbent term-limited. New secretary elected. Democratic gain.	▌ ✓ Cisco Aguilar (Democratic) 48.9%; ▌Jim Marchant (Republican) 46.7%; Others: ▌None of These Candidates 1.8%; ▌Janine Hansen (Independent American) 1.7%; ▌Ross Crane (Libertarian) 0.9%
New Mexico	Maggie Toulouse Oliver	Democratic	2016 (special)	Incumbent re-elected.	▌ ✓ Maggie Toulouse Oliver (Democratic) 54.5%; ▌Audrey Trujillo (Republican) 42.6%; ▌Mayna Erika Myers (Libertarian) 2.8%
North Dakota	Alvin Jaeger	Republican	1992	Incumbent retired. New secretary elected. Republican hold.	▌ ✓ Michael Howe (Republican) 63.3%; ▌Jeffrey Powell (Democratic–NPL) 27.5%; ▌Charles Tuttle (Independent) 9.2%
Ohio	Frank LaRose	Republican	2018	Incumbent re-elected.	▌ ✓ Frank LaRose (Republican) 59.5%; ▌Chelsea Clark (Democratic) 39.4%; ▌Terpsehore Tore Maras (Independent) 1.0%
Rhode Island	Nellie Gorbea	Democratic	2014	Incumbent term-limited. New secretary elected. Democratic hold.	▌ ✓ Gregg Amore (Democratic) 59.6%; ▌Pat Cortellessa (Republican) 40.4%
South Carolina	Mark Hammond	Republican	2002	Incumbent re-elected.	▌ ✓ Mark Hammond (Republican) 63.4%; ▌Rosemounda Peggy Butler (Democratic) 36.6%
South Dakota	Steve Barnett	Republican	2018	Incumbent lost renomination. New secretary elected. Republican hold.	▌ ✓ Monae Johnson (Republican) 63.9%; ▌Thomas Cool (Democratic) 36.1%
Vermont	Jim Condos	Democratic	2010	Incumbent retired. New secretary elected. Democratic hold.	▌ ✓ Sarah Copeland-Hanzas (Democratic) 65.0%; ▌H. Brooke Paige (Republican) 35.0%
Washington (special)	Steve Hobbs	Democratic	2021 (Note: Hobbs took office after his predecessor (Kim Wyman) resigned.)	Interim appointee elected.	▌ ✓ Steve Hobbs (Democratic) 49.8%; ▌Julie Anderson (Independent) 45.8%
Wisconsin	Doug La Follette	Democratic	1982	Incumbent re-elected.	▌ ✓ Doug La Follette (Democratic) 48.3%; ▌Amy Loudenbeck (Republican) 48.0%; ▌Neil Harmon (Libertarian) 2.1%; ▌Sharyl McFarland (Green) 1.6%
Wyoming	Karl Allred	Republican	2022 (Note: Allred took office after his predecessor (Edward Buchanan) resigned.)	Interim appointee retired. New secretary elected. Republican hold.	▌ ✓ Chuck Gray (Republican)

== Closest races ==
States where the margin of victory was under 1%:

1. Wisconsin, 0.29%

States where the margin of victory was under 5%:

1. Nevada, 2.28%
2. Washington, 3.95%
3. Arizona, 4.77%

States where the margin of victory was under 10%:

1. Minnesota, 9.16%
2. Georgia, 9.24%
3. Illinois, 9.73%

Blue denotes races won by Democrats. Red denotes races won by Republicans.

== Alabama ==
Alabama Secretary of State election
Nominee	Wes Allen	Pamela Laffitte
Party	Republican	Democratic
Popular vote	923,206	435,558
Percentage	65.9%	31.1%
- County results Allen: 50–60% 60–70% 70–80% 80–90% >90% Laffitte: 50–60% 60–70% 70–80%
Secretary of State before election
John Merrill
Republican
Elected Secretary of State
Wes Allen
Republican

Incumbent Republican John Merrill was term-limited. Republican state representative Wes Allen, election administrator Ed Packard, Alabama State Auditor Jim Zeigler and activist Christian Horn ran for the seat. Corrections officer Pamela Laffitte was the only Democratic candidate in that party's primary.

Allen won his runoff on June 21, while Laffitte won her primary on May 24.

Allen won the general election.

== Arizona ==
Arizona Secretary of State election
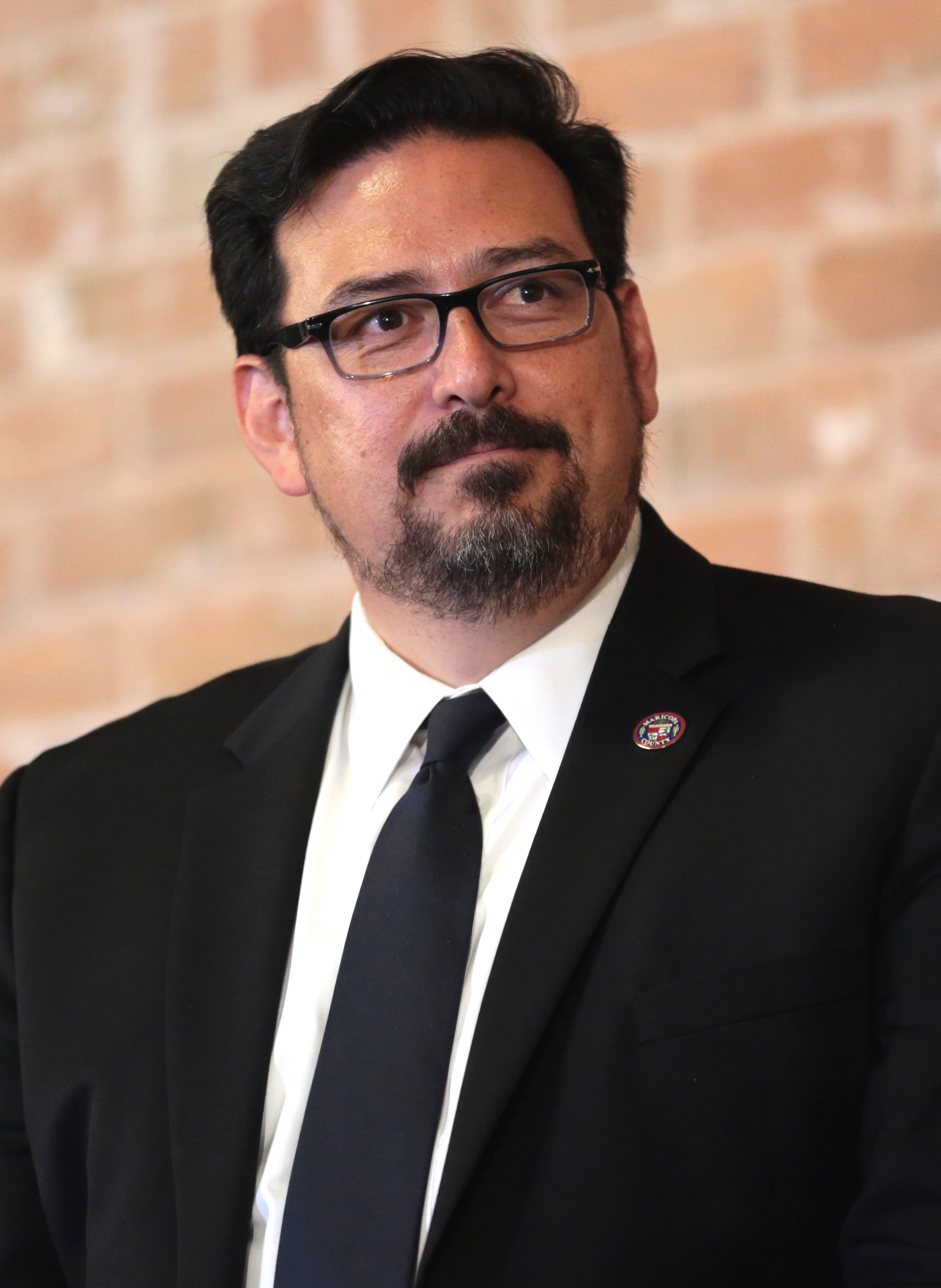

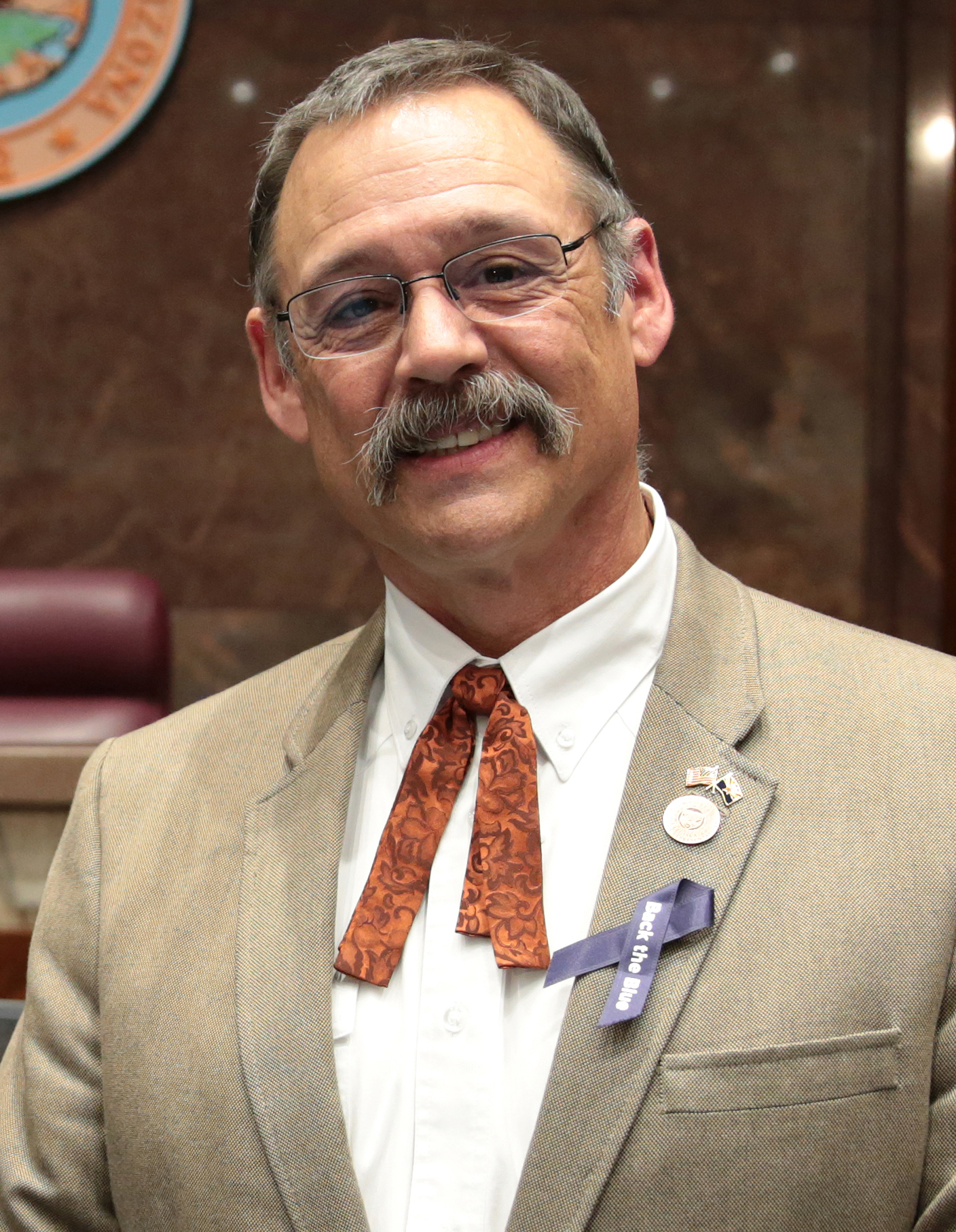
Nominee	Adrian Fontes	Mark Finchem
Party	Democratic	Republican
Popular vote	1,320,619	1,200,411
Percentage	52.4%	47.6%
- County results Fontes: 50–60% 60–70% 70–80% Finchem: 50–60% 60–70% 70–80%
Secretary of State before election
Katie Hobbs
Democratic
Elected Secretary of State
Adrian Fontes
Democratic

Incumbent Democrat Katie Hobbs retired to run for governor.

Democratic primary candidates included minority leader of the Arizona House of Representatives Reginald Bolding and former Maricopa County recorder Adrian Fontes.

Republican primary candidates included state representatives Shawnna Bolick and Mark Finchem, advertising executive Beau Lane, and state senator Michelle Ugenti-Rita.

Fontes and Finchem won their respective primaries on August 2.

Fontes won the general election.

== Arkansas ==
Arkansas Secretary of State election
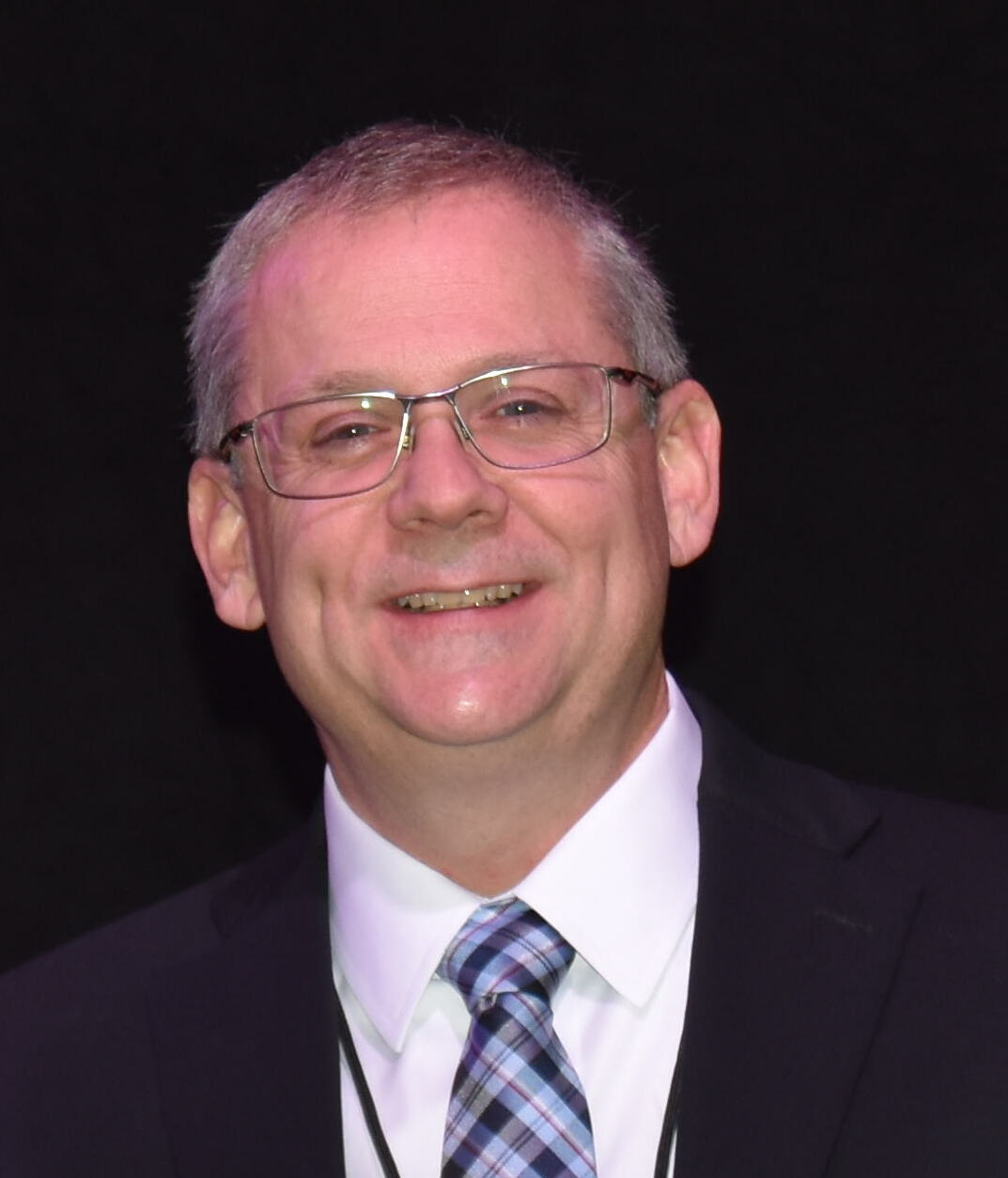

Candidate	John Thurston	Anna Beth Gorman
Party	Republican	Democratic
Popular vote	597,806	292,488
Percentage	67.1%	32.9%
- County results Thurston: 50–60% 60–70% 70–80% 80–90% Gorman: 50–60%
Secretary of State before election
John Thurston
Republican
Elected Secretary of State
John Thurston
Republican

Incumbent Republican John Thurston ran for re-election. Former state representative Eddie Joe Williams unsuccessfully challenged Thurston in the Republican primary.

Democratic primary candidates included executive director of the Women's Foundation of Arkansas Anna Beth Gorman and former Pulaski County election commissioner Josh Price.

Thurston and Gorman won their respective primaries on May 24.

Thurston won re-election.

== California ==
California Secretary of State election
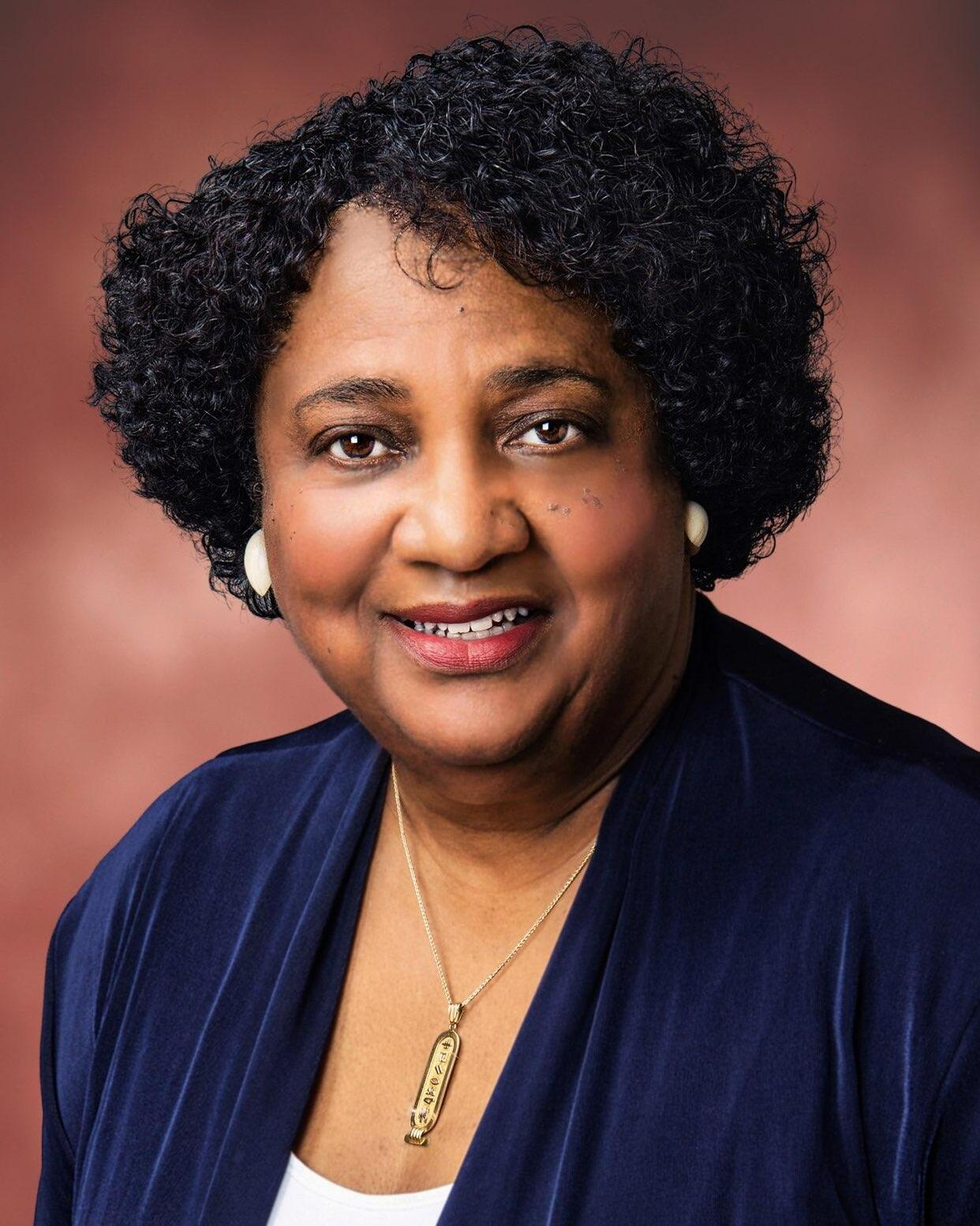

Candidate	Shirley Weber	Rob Bernosky
Party	Democratic	Republican
Popular vote	6,462,159	4,298,526
Percentage	60.1%	39.9%
- County results Weber: 50–60% 60–70% 70–80% 80–90% Bernosky: 50–60% 60–70% 70–80%
Secretary of State before election
Shirley Weber
Democratic
Elected Secretary of State
Shirley Weber
Democratic

Incumbent Democrat Shirley Weber ran for election to a full term.

Republican primary candidates included chief financial officer Rob Bernosky, author Rachel Hamm, Teamster truck driver James "J. W." Paine, and retired warehouseman Raul Rodriguez Jr.

Teacher Gary B. Blenner ran as the Green Party candidate, while private investigator Matthew D. Cinquanta ran as an independent.

Weber and Bernosky advanced from the nonpartisan blanket primary on June 7.

Weber won re-election.

== Colorado ==
Colorado Secretary of State election
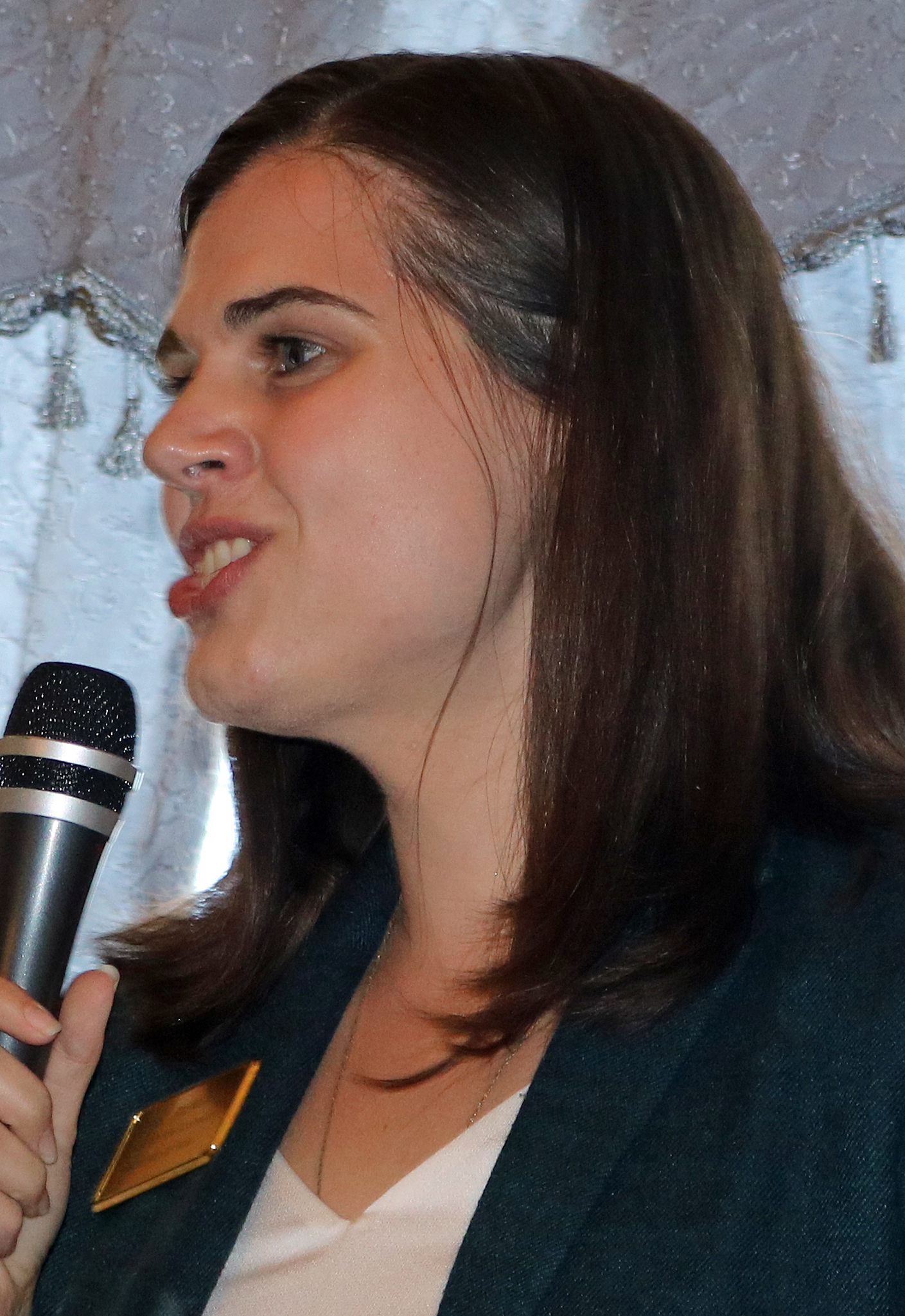

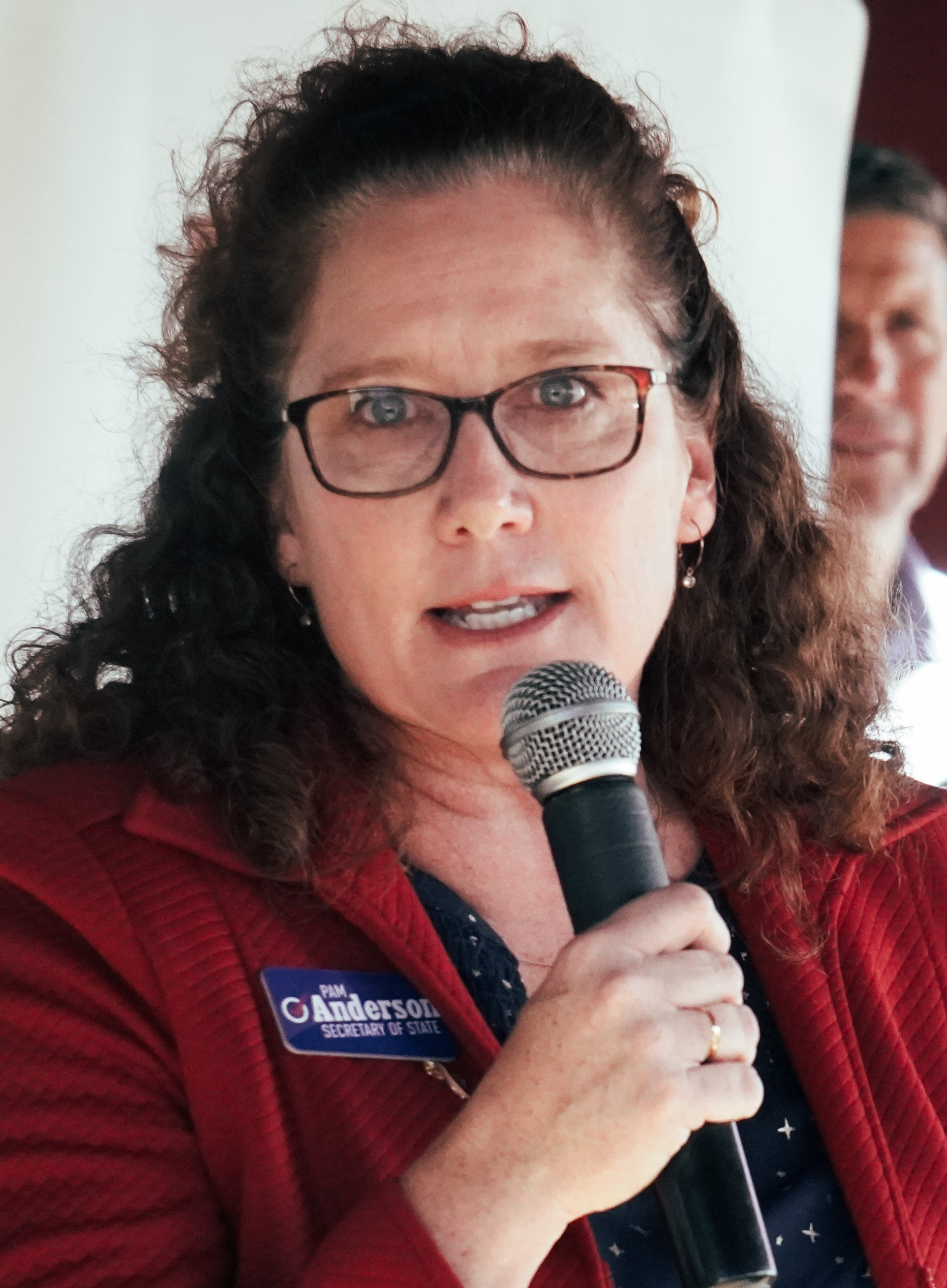
Nominee	Jena Griswold	Pam Anderson
Party	Democratic	Republican
Popular vote	1,369,040	1,045,582
Percentage	55.1%	42.1%
- County results Griswold: 40–50% 50–60% 60–70% 70–80% Anderson: 50–60% 60–70% 70–80% 80–90%
Secretary of State before election
Jena Griswold
Democratic
Elected Secretary of State
Jena Griswold
Democratic

Incumbent Democrat Jena Griswold ran for re-election.

Republican primary candidates included former Jefferson County clerk Pam Anderson, former head of the nonprofit Colorado Lending Source Mike O'Donnell, and Mesa County clerk Tina Peters. Walter James Rutledge ran as a Libertarian.

Griswold and Anderson won their respective primaries on June 28.

Griswold won re-election.

== Connecticut ==
Connecticut Secretary of State election
- November 8, 2022
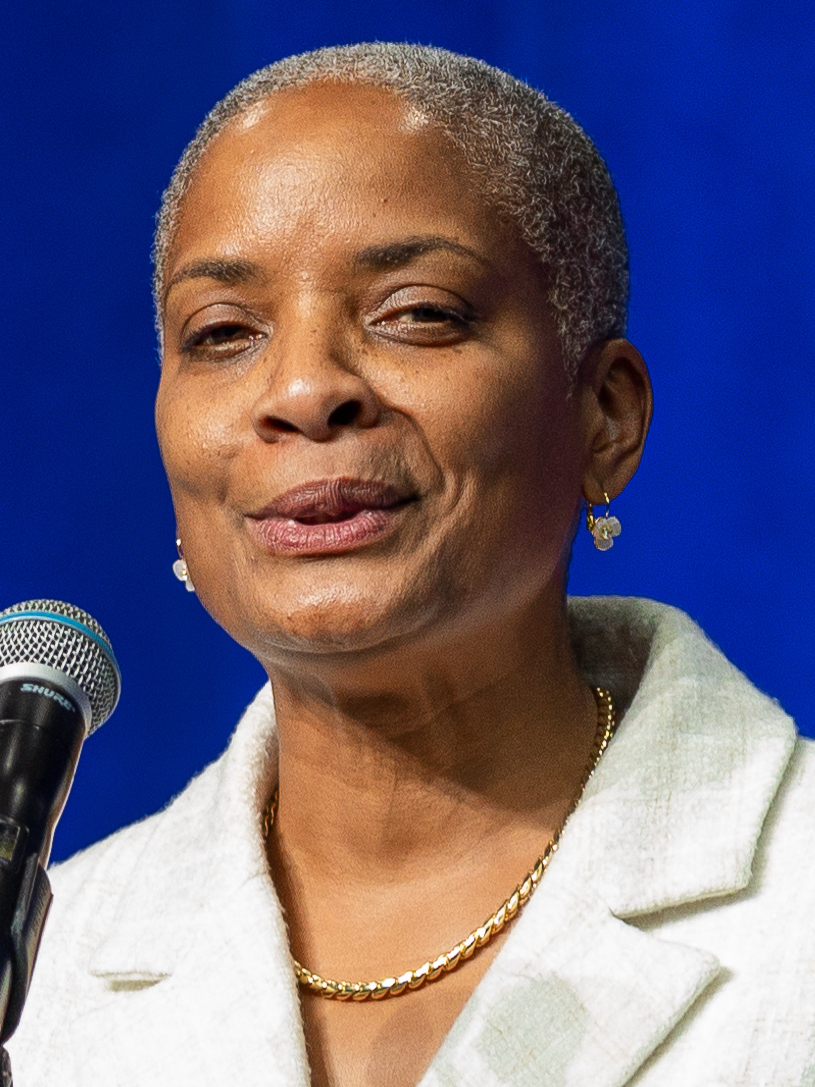

Nominee	Stephanie Thomas	Dominic Rapini
Party	Democratic	Republican
Alliance	Working Families
Popular vote	687,714	532,218
Percentage	55.2%	42.7%
- Thomas: 40–50% 50–60% 60–70% 70–80% 80–90% Rapini: 40–50% 50–60% 60–70%
Secretary of State before election
Mark Kohler
Democratic
Elected Secretary of State
Stephanie Thomas
Democratic

Incumbent Democrat Mark Kohler retired, having been appointed to the position after Denise Merrill resigned early. Democratic primary candidates included New Haven health director Maritza Bond and state representative Stephanie Thomas.

Republican primary candidates included Apple senior account manager Dominic Rapini, New Britain executive mayoral aide Brock Weber, and state representative Terrie Wood.

Environmental attorney Cynthia Jennings ran on the Independent Party of Connecticut ticket. Harold Harris ran as a Libertarian, while Douglas Lary ran as the Green Party candidate.

Thomas and Rapini won their respective primaries on August 9.

Thomas won the election.

== Georgia ==
Georgia Secretary of State election
- November 8, 2022
- Turnout: 57.02% ▲
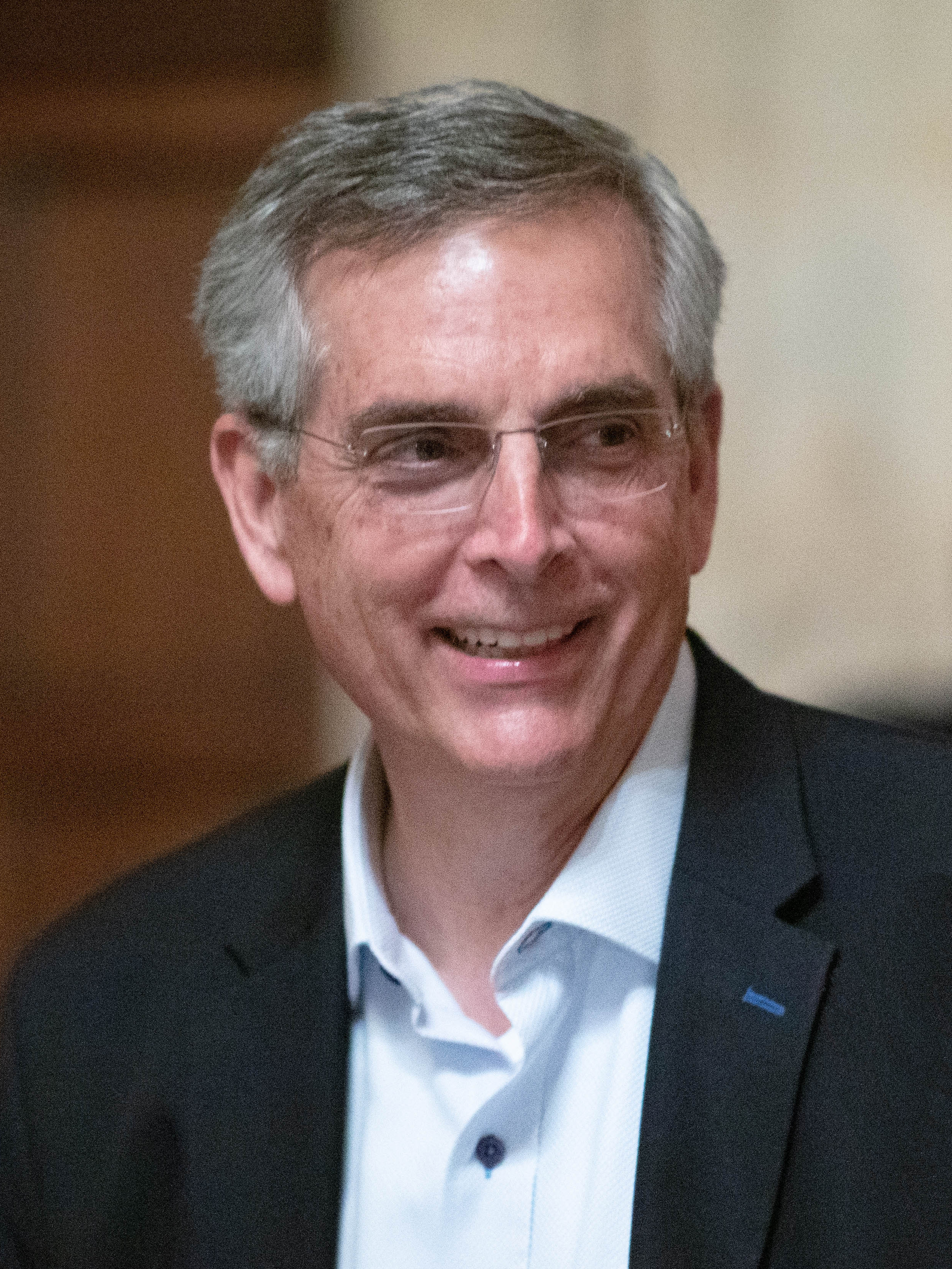

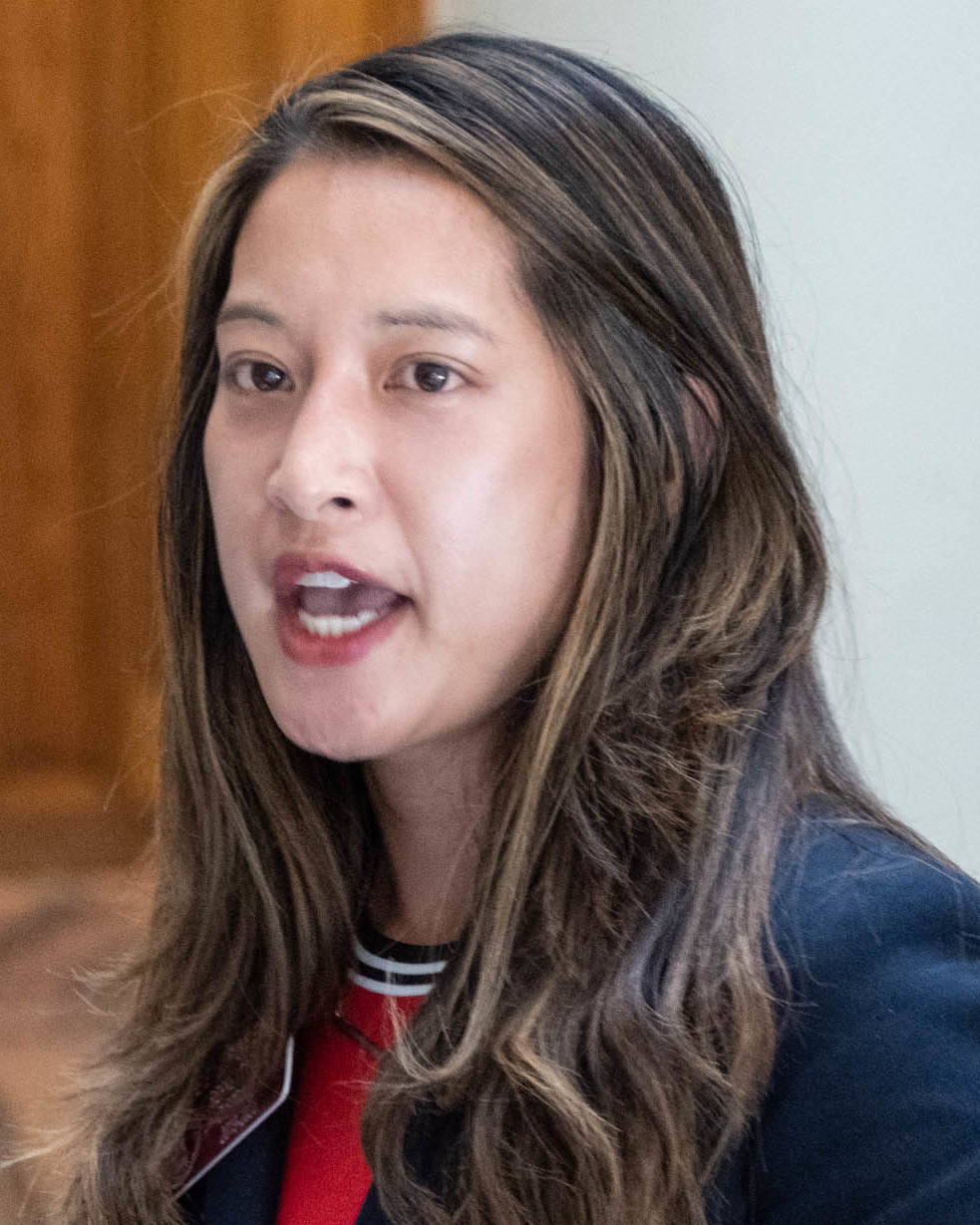
Nominee	Brad Raffensperger	Bee Nguyen
Party	Republican	Democratic
Popular vote	2,081,421	1,719,922
Percentage	53.2%	44.0%
- County results Raffensperger: 40–50% 50–60% 60–70% 70–80% 80–90% <90% Nguyen: 40–50% 50–60% 60–70% 70–80% 80–90%
Secretary of State before election
Brad Raffensperger
Republican
Elected Secretary of State
Brad Raffensperger
Republican

Incumbent Republican Brad Raffensperger ran for re-election. Other Republican candidates included U.S. Representative for Georgia's 10th congressional district Jody Hice, former Treutlen County probate judge T. J. Hudson, and former Alpharetta mayor David Belle Isle.

Democratic primary candidates included former state representative Dee Dawkins-Haigler, former Fulton County chairman John Eaves, former Milledgeville mayor Floyd Griffin, state representative Bee Nguyen, and former chair of the Cobb County Democratic party Michael Owens.

Ted Metz ran as a Libertarian.

Raffensperger won his primary on May 24, while Nguyen won her runoff on June 21.

Raffensperger won re-election in the general election.

== Idaho ==
Idaho Secretary of State election
Nominee	Phil McGrane	Shawn Keenan
Party	Republican	Democratic
Popular vote	418,937	159,087
Percentage	72.5%	27.5%
- County results McGrane: 50–60% 60–70% 70–80% 80–90% Keenan: 50–60% 60–70%
Secretary of State before election
Lawerence Denney
Republican
Elected Secretary of State
Phil McGrane
Republican

Incumbent Republican Lawerence Denney retired. Republican primary candidates included Ada County clerk Phil McGrane, state representative Dorothy Moon, and state senator Mary Souza.

Shawn Keenan was the only Democratic candidate.

McGrane and Keenan won their respective primaries on May 17.

McGrane won the general election.

== Illinois ==
Illinois Secretary of State election
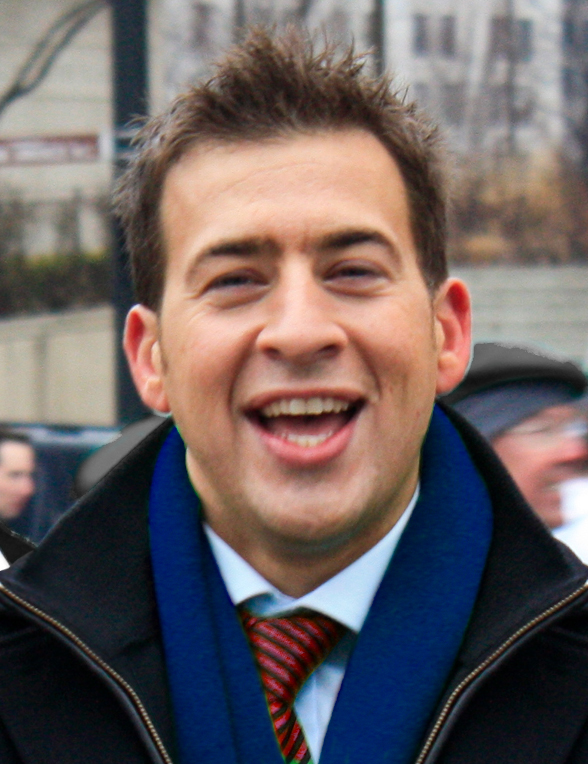

Nominee	Alexi Giannoulias	Dan Brady
Party	Democratic	Republican
Popular vote	2,220,713	1,783,070
Percentage	54.3%	43.6%
- County results Giannoulias: 40–50% 50–60% 70–80% Brady: 40–50% 50–60% 60–70% 70–80% 80–90%
Secretary of State before election
Jesse White
Democratic
Elected Secretary of State
Alexi Giannoulias
Democratic

Incumbent Democrat Jesse White retired.

Democratic candidates included former Illinois state treasurer Alexi Giannoulias, Chicago alderman David Moore, Cook County resident Sidney Moore, and city clerk of Chicago Anna Valencia.

Republican candidates included deputy minority leader of the Illinois House of Representatives Dan Brady, former United States Attorney for the Central District of Illinois John C. Milhiser, and former Chicago police sergeant Michelle Turney.

Giannoulias and Brady won their respective primaries on June 28.

Giannoulias won the election.

== Indiana ==
Indiana Secretary of State election
- November 8, 2022
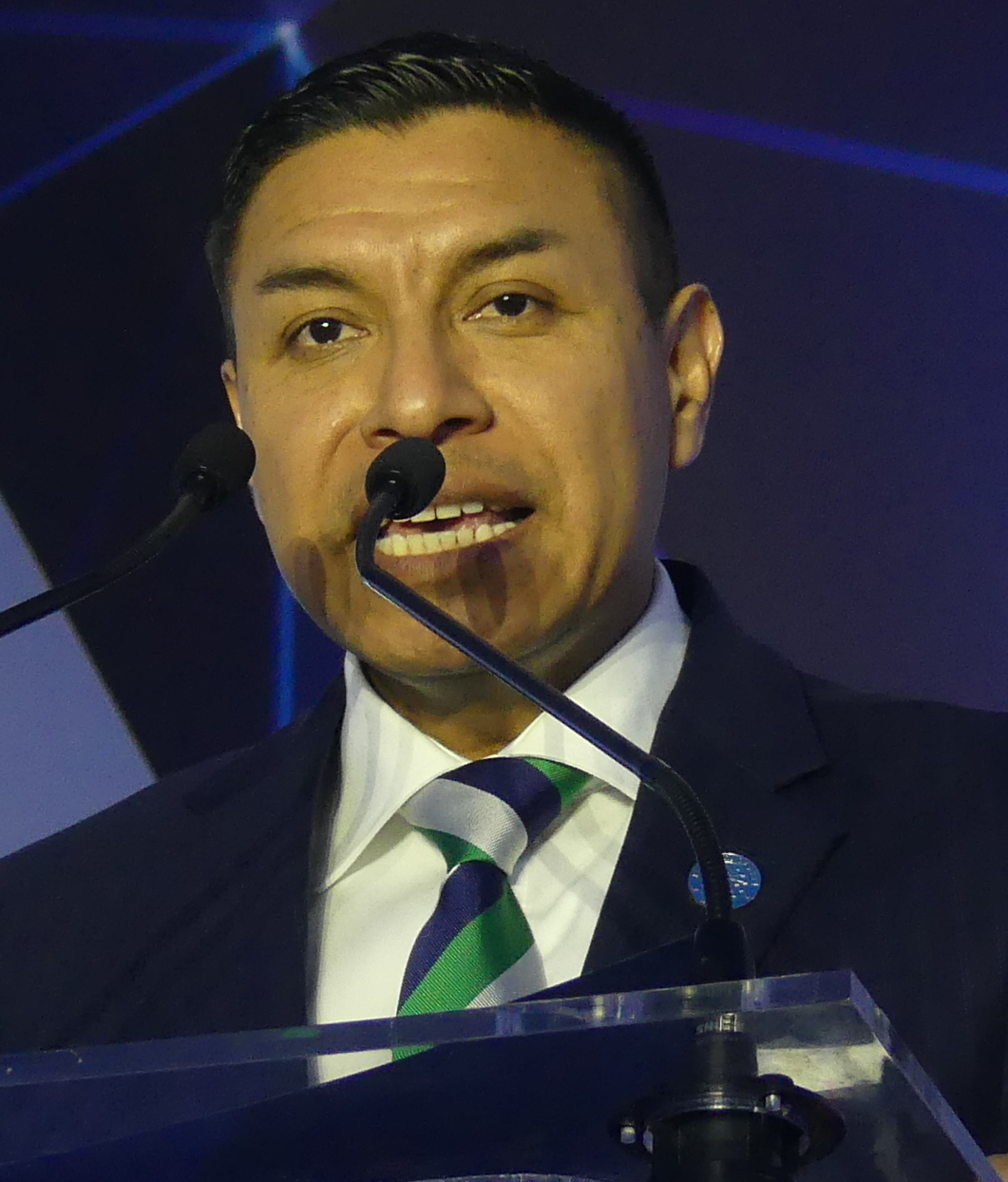
Nominee	Diego Morales	Destiny Wells	Jeff Maurer
Party	Republican	Democratic	Libertarian
Popular vote	999,893	742,624	104,519
Percentage	54.1%	40.2%	5.7%
- County results Morales: 40–50% 50–60% 60–70% 70–80% Wells: 40–50% 50–60% 60–70%
Secretary of State before election
Holli Sullivan
Republican
Elected Secretary of State
Diego Morales
Republican

Incumbent Republican Holli Sullivan was appointed by governor Eric Holcomb after the previous secretary, Connie Lawson, resigned. Sullivan ran for a full term. Other Republican candidates included Newton County commissioner Kyle Conrad, perennial candidate Paul Hager, and former aide to governor Mike Pence and candidate for Indiana's 4th congressional district in 2018 Diego Morales.

The only Democratic candidate is former deputy attorney general Destiny Scott Wells.

Jeff Maurer ran as a Libertarian.

Morales won the nomination at the Republican state convention on June 18. He also won the general election.

== Iowa ==
Iowa Secretary of State election
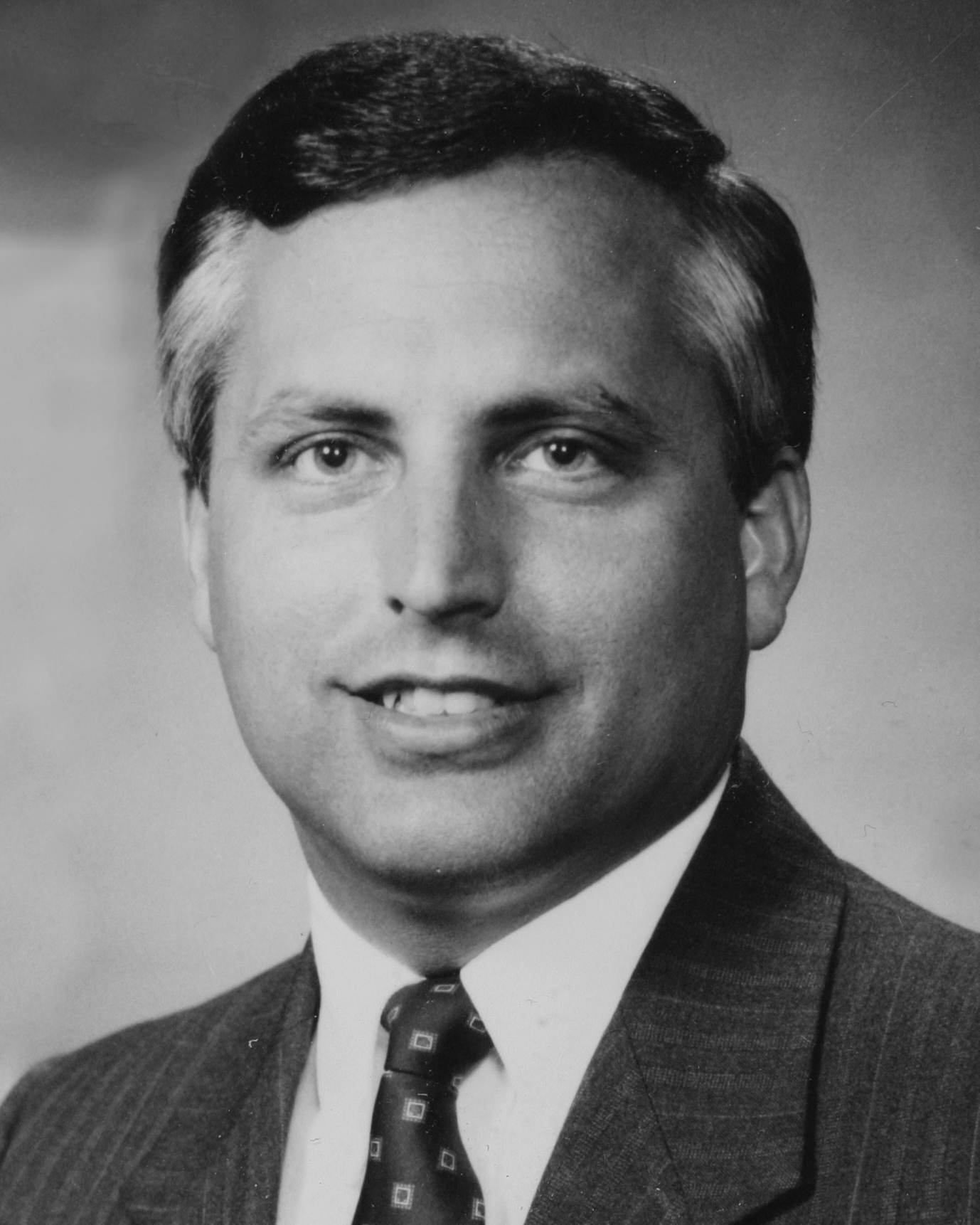
Nominee	Paul Pate	Joel Miller
Party	Republican	Democratic
Popular vote	723,084	480,178
Percentage	60.1%	39.9%
- County results Pate: 50–60% 60–70% 70–80% 80–90% Miller: 50–60% 60–70%
Secretary of State before election
Paul Pate
Republican
Elected Secretary of State
Paul Pate
Republican

Incumbent Republican Paul Pate ran for re-election.

Democratic primary candidates included Linn County auditor Joel Miller and Clinton County auditor Eric Van Lancker.

Pate and Miller won their respective primaries on June 7.

Pate won re-election.

== Kansas ==
Kansas Secretary of State election
- November 8, 2022
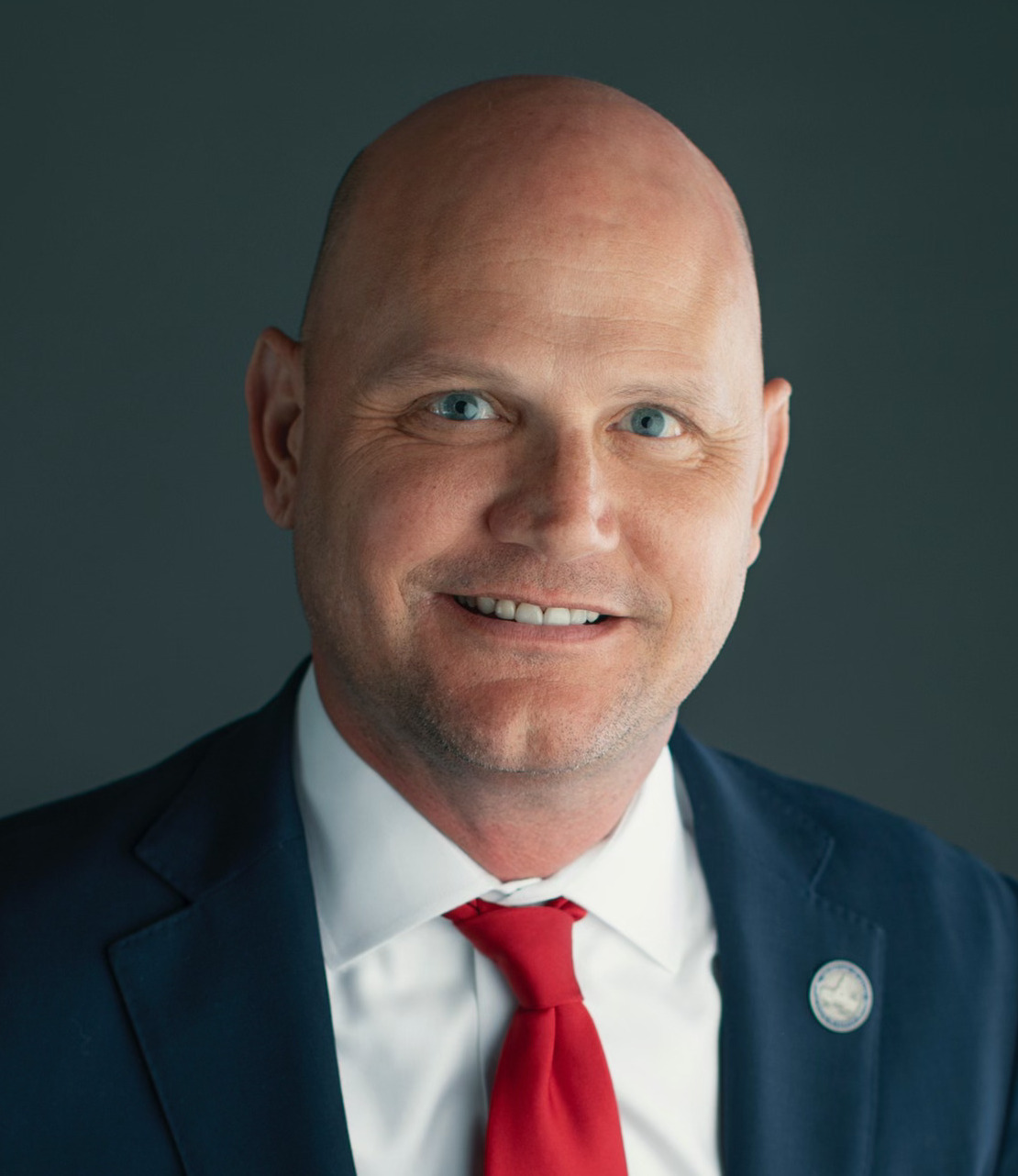

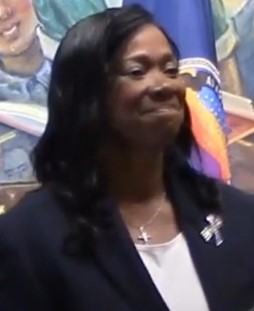
Nominee	Scott Schwab	Jeanna Repass
Party	Republican	Democratic
Popular vote	580,908	386,661
Percentage	58.4%	38.8%
- County results Schwab: 40-50% 50-60% 60-70% 70-80% 80-90% >90% Repass: 50-60% 60-70%
Secretary of State before election
Scott Schwab
Republican
Elected Secretary of State
Scott Schwab
Republican

Incumbent Republican Scott Schwab ran for re-election. He faced an unsuccessful primary challenge from Michael Brown, former member of the Johnson County Commission.

The only Democratic candidate was former director of urban outreach for the United Methodist Church of the Resurrection Jeanna Repass.

Schwab won re-election in the general election.

== Massachusetts ==
Massachusetts Secretary of the Commonwealth election
- November 8, 2022
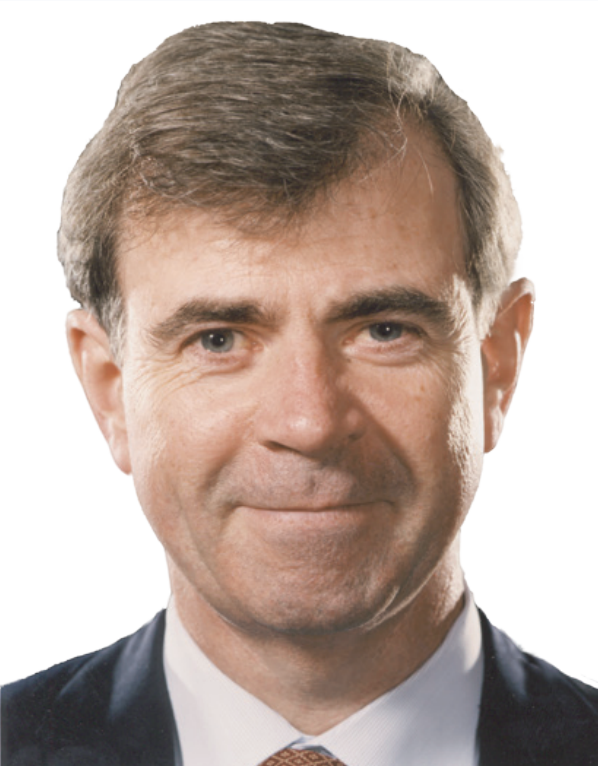

Nominee	William Galvin	Rayla Campbell
Party	Democratic	Republican
Popular vote	1,665,808	722,021
Percentage	67.7%	29.3%
- Galvin: 40–50% 50–60% 60–70% 70–80% 80–90% >90% Campbell: 40–50% 50–60%
Secretary of the Commonwealth before election
William Galvin
Democratic
Elected Secretary of the Commonwealth
William Galvin
Democratic

Incumbent Democrat William F. Galvin ran for re-election. Tanisha Sullivan, president of the Boston chapter of the NAACP, challenged Galvin in the Democratic primary.

The only Republican candidate was former dental assistant and insurance claims manager Rayla Campbell.

Galvin won re-election.

== Michigan ==
Michigan Secretary of State election
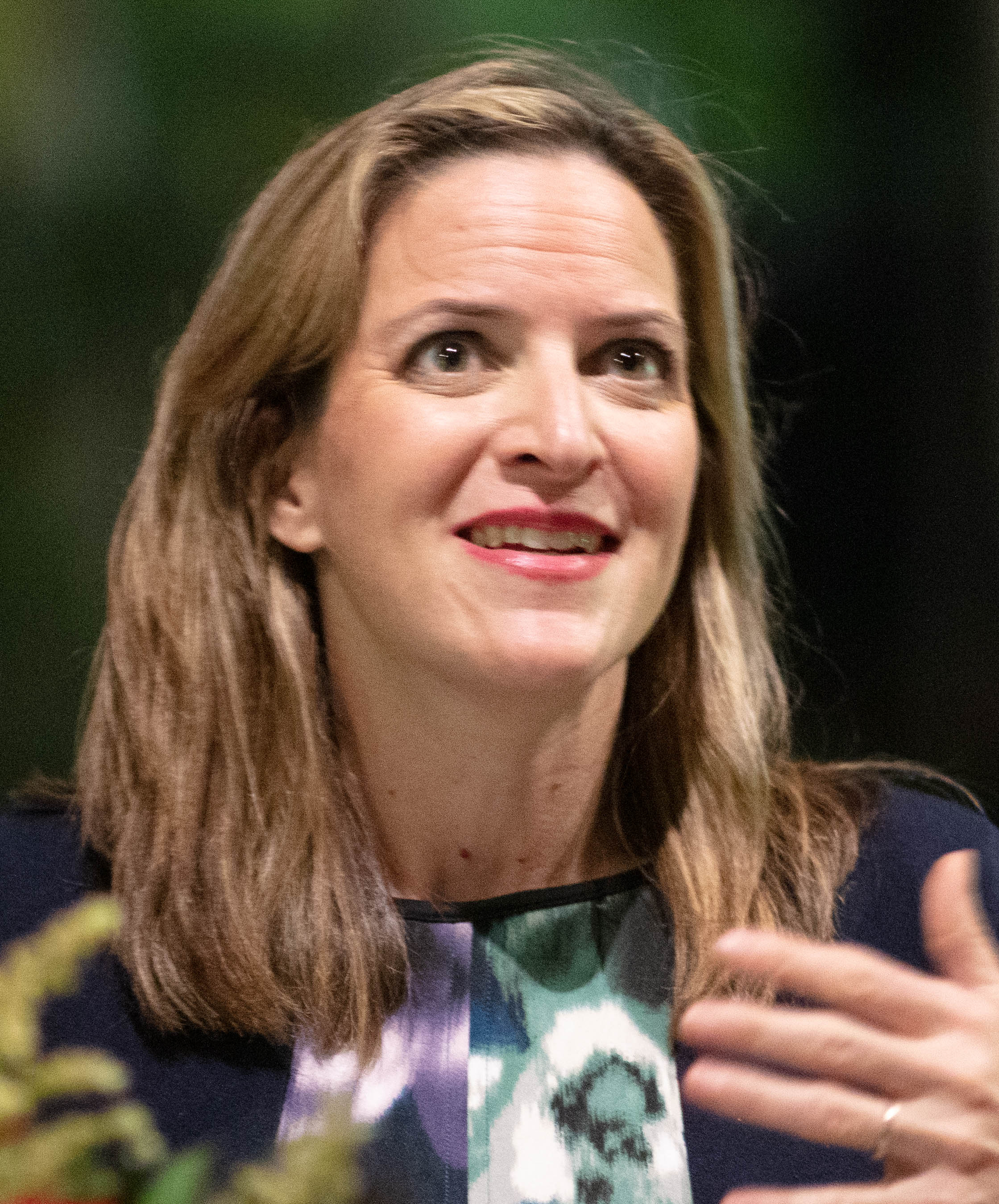

Nominee	Jocelyn Benson	Kristina Karamo
Party	Democratic	Republican
Popular vote	2,467,859	1,852,510
Percentage	55.9%	41.9%
- Benson: 40–50% 50–60% 60–70% 70–80% Karamo: 40–50% 50–60% 60–70% 70–80%
Secretary of State before election
Jocelyn Benson
Democratic
Elected Secretary of State
Jocelyn Benson
Democratic

Incumbent Democrat Jocelyn Benson ran for re-election.

Republican primary candidates included Chesterfield Township clerk Cindy Berry, Republican activist Kristina Karamo, state representative Beau LaFave and Plainfield Township clerk Cathleen Postmus.

Karamo won the August 2 Republican primary.

Benson won re-election.

== Minnesota ==
Minnesota Secretary of State election
- November 8, 2022
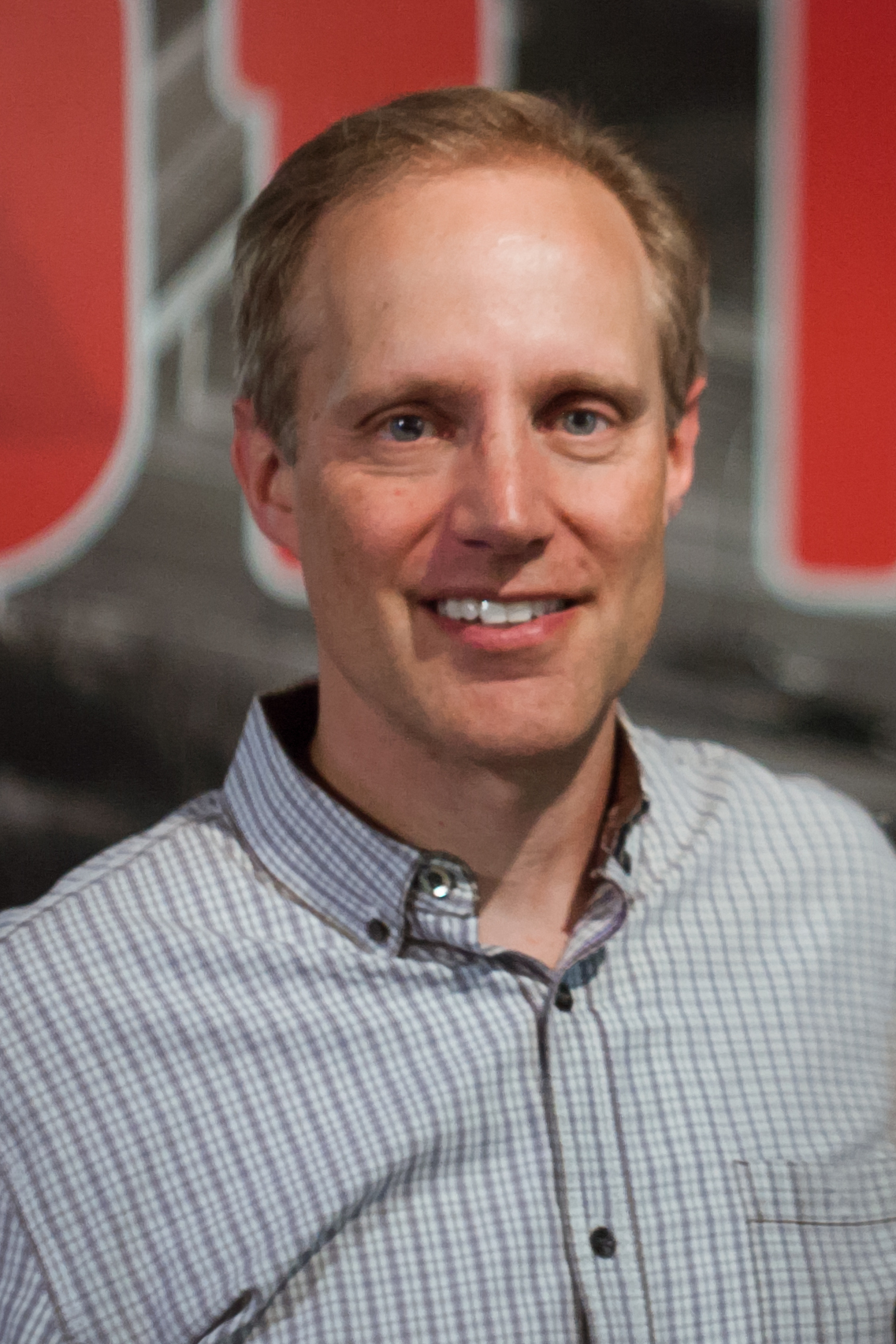

Nominee	Steve Simon	Kim Crockett
Party	Democratic (DFL)	Republican
Popular vote	1,345,685	1,119,949
Percentage	54.5%	45.4%
- Simon: 50–60% 60–70% 70–80% Crockett: 50–60% 60–70% 70–80%
Secretary of State before election
Steve Simon
Democratic (DFL)
Elected Secretary of State
Steve Simon
Democratic (DFL)

Incumbent Democrat Steve Simon ran for re-election. He faced an unsuccessful primary challenge from Steve Carlson.

Republican primary candidates included Kim Crockett, former vice president of the conservative think tank Center of the American Experiment, and author Erik van Mechelen.

Crockett won her primary on August 9.

Simon won re-election.

== Nebraska ==
Nebraska Secretary of State election
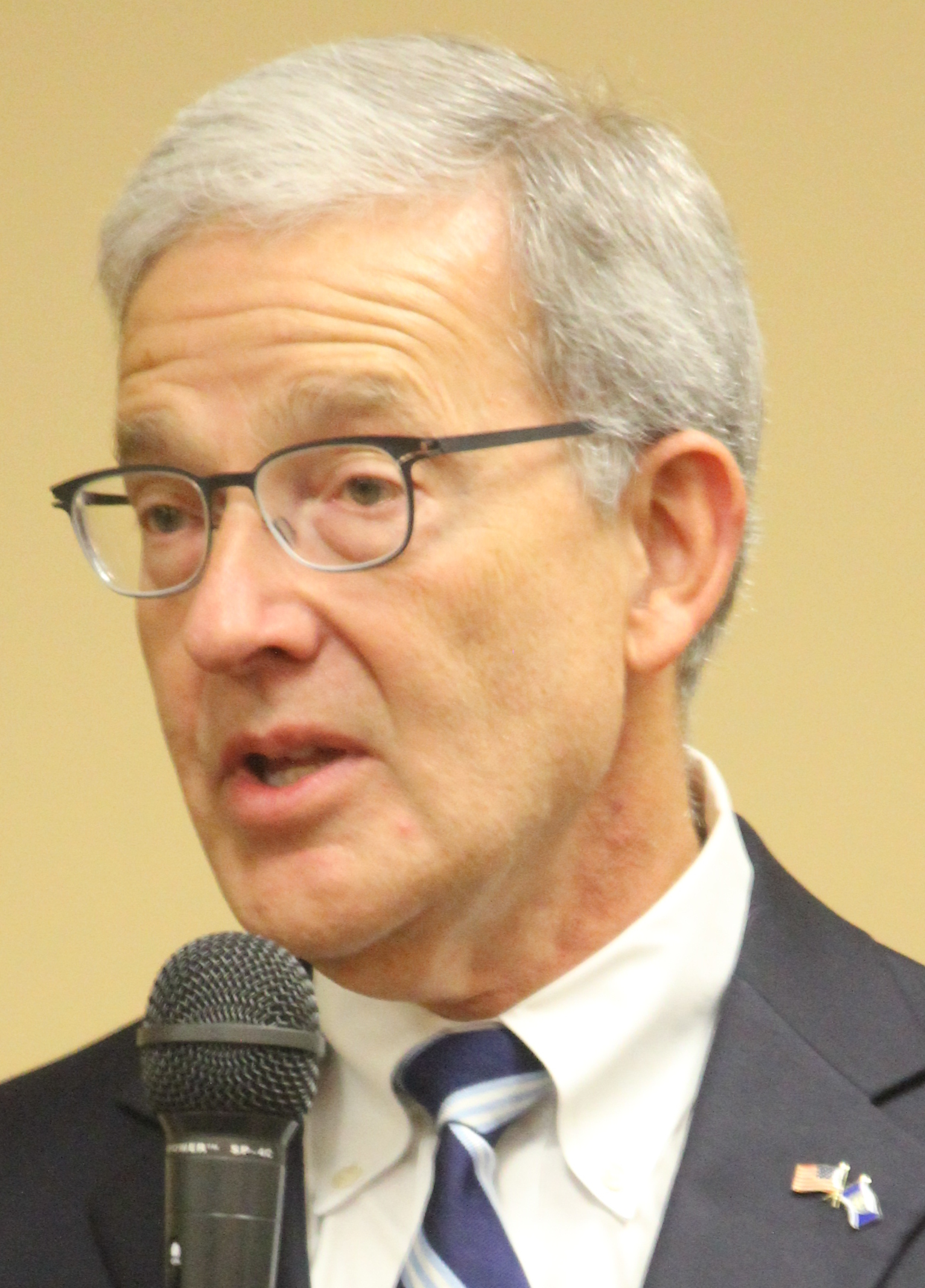
Nominee	Bob Evnen
Party	Republican
Secretary of State before election
Bob Evnen
Republican
Elected Secretary of State
Bob Evnen
Republican

Incumbent Republican Bob Evnen ran for re-election. Former Palmyra fire chief Rex Schroder and Robert J. Borer challenged him in the Republican primary.

Evnen won his primary on May 10. He won re-election.

== Nevada ==
Nevada Secretary of State election
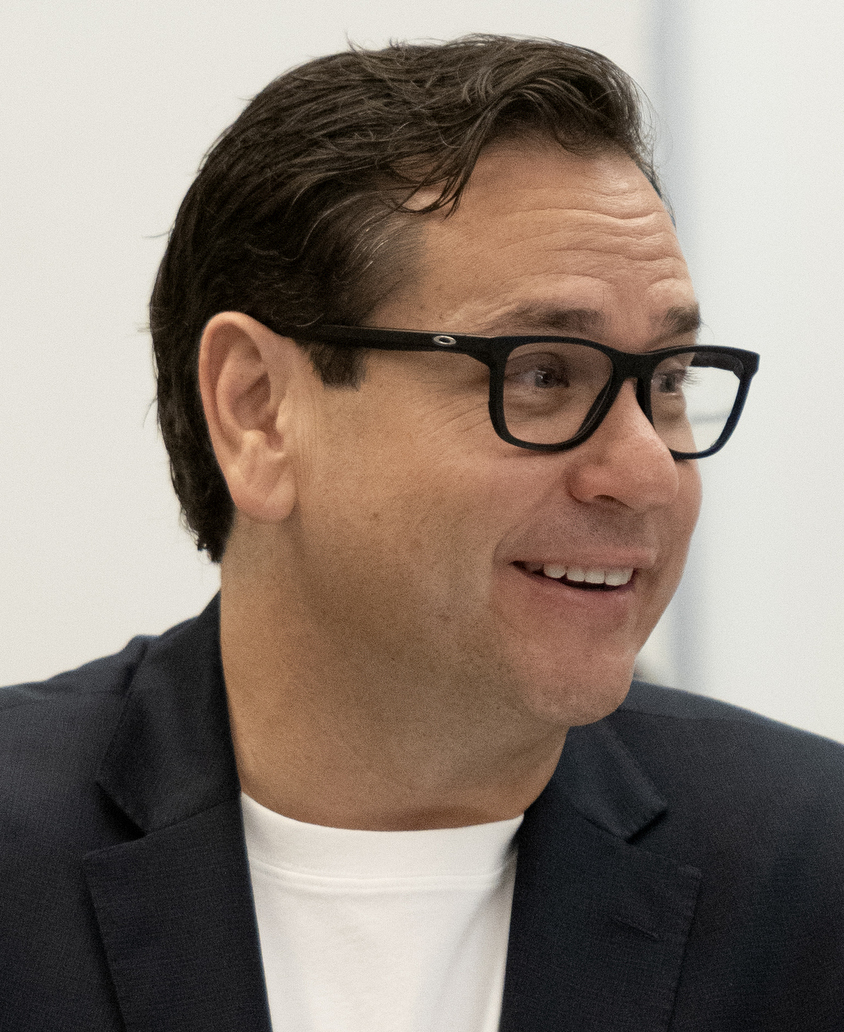

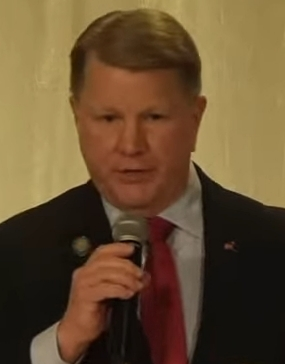
Nominee	Cisco Aguilar	Jim Marchant
Party	Democratic	Republican
Popular vote	496,569	473,467
Percentage	48.9%	46.7%
- County results Aguilar: 50–60% Marchant: 50–60% 60–70% 70–80% 80–90%
Secretary of State before election
Barbara Cegavske
Republican
Elected Secretary of State
Cisco Aguilar
Democratic

Incumbent Republican Barbara Cegavske was term-limited and cannot seek a third term.

Republican candidates included Sparks city councilman Kristopher Dahir, entrepreneur John Cardiff Gerhardt, former state senator Jesse Haw, businesswoman Socorro Kennan, former member of the Nevada Assembly Jim Marchant, former news anchor Gerard Ramalho, and former Nevada 8th judicial district court judge Richard Scotti.

The only Democratic primary candidate was former Harry Reid staffer Cisco Aguilar. Janine Hansen is running as the candidate of the Independent American Party, while Ross Crane is running as a Libertarian.

Marchant and Aguilar won their respective primaries on June 14.

Aguilar narrowly won the general election.

== New Mexico ==
New Mexico Secretary of State election
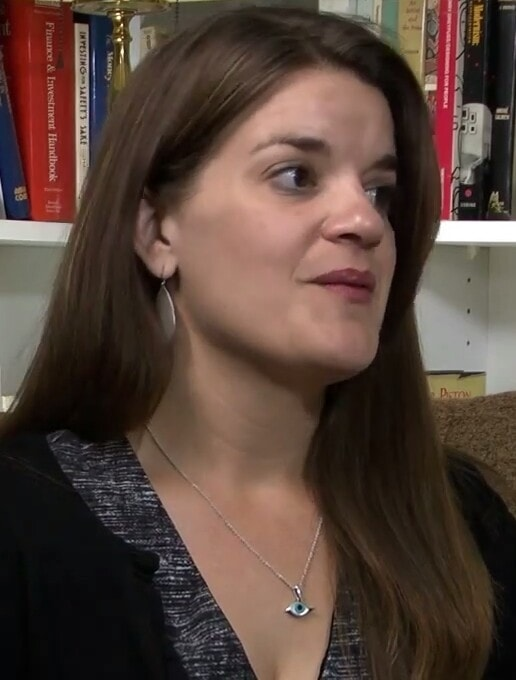

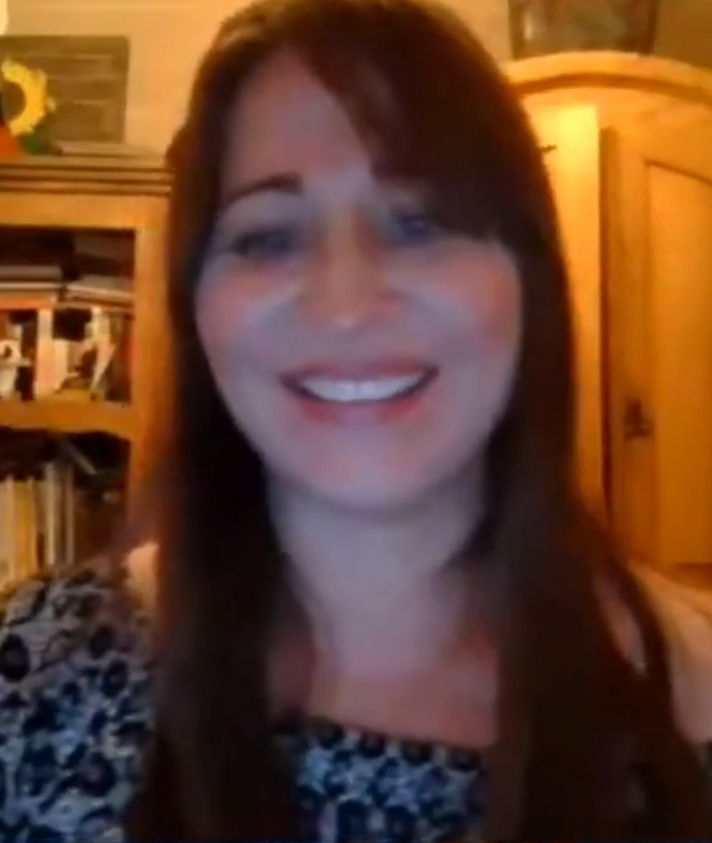
Nominee	Maggie Toulouse Oliver	Audrey Trujillo
Party	Democratic	Republican
Popular vote	384,526	300,763
Percentage	54.5%	42.6%
- County results Oliver: 40–50% 50–60% 60–70% 70–80% Trujillo: 50–60% 60–70% 70–80% 80–90%
Secretary of State before election
Maggie Toulouse Oliver
Democratic
Elected Secretary of State
Maggie Toulouse Oliver
Democratic

Incumbent Democrat Maggie Toulouse Oliver ran for re-election. Republican rancher Audrey Trujillo challenged Oliver. Libertarian candidate Mayna Erika Myers was also running.

Oliver and Trujillo won their respective primaries on June 7.

Oliver won re-election.

== North Dakota ==
North Dakota Secretary of State election
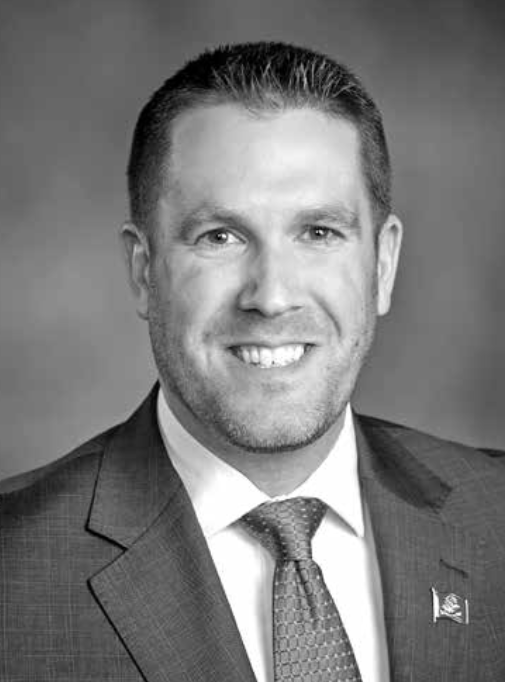

Nominee	Michael Howe	Jeffrey Powell
Party	Republican	Democratic–NPL
Popular vote	147,410	64,041
Percentage	63.3%	27.5%
- County results Howe: 50–60% 60–70% 70–80% 80–90% Powell: 50–60%
Secretary of State before election
Alvin Jaeger
Republican
Elected Secretary of State
Michael Howe
Republican

Incumbent Republican Alvin Jaeger retired. State representative Michael Howe and businessman Marvin Lepp ran in the Republican primary.

The only Democratic primary candidate was Mayville State University administrator Jeffrey Powell.

Howe and Powell won their respective primaries on June 14.

Howe won the general election.

== Ohio ==
Ohio Secretary of State election
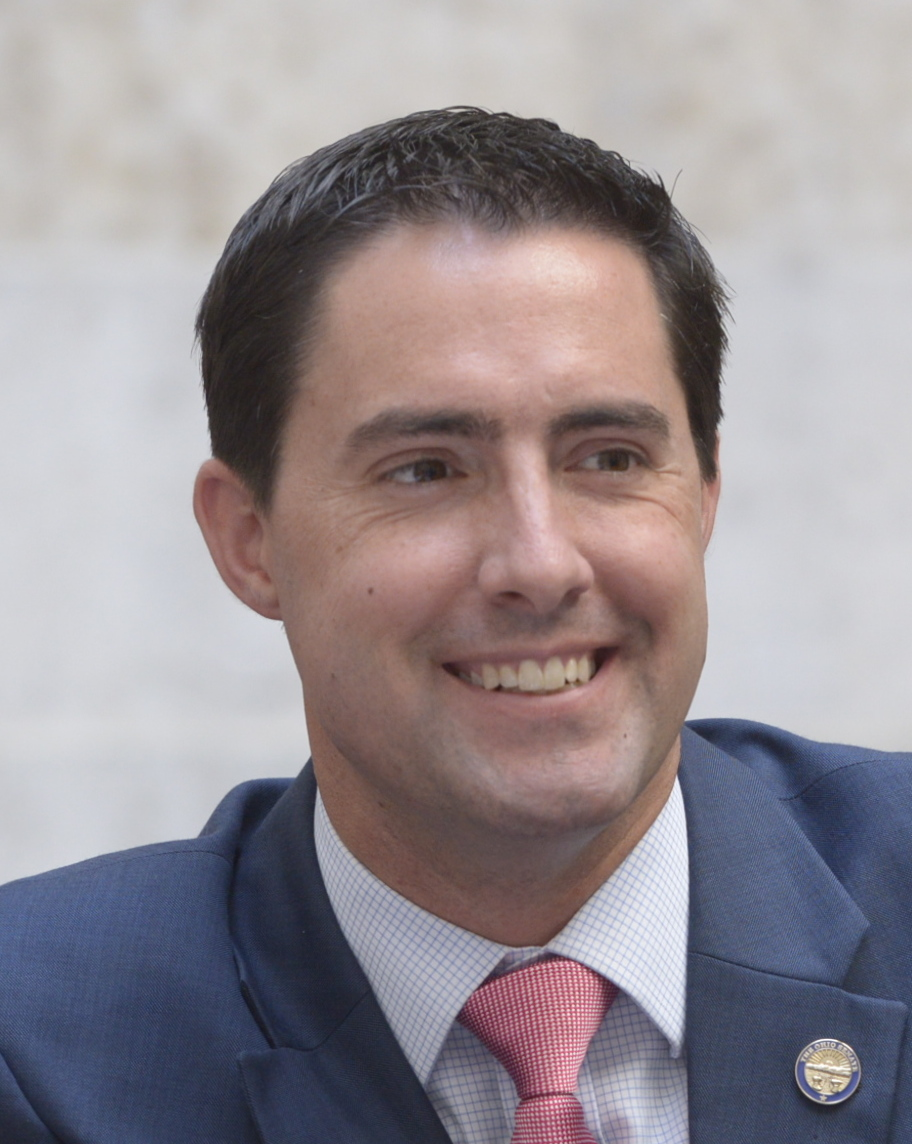

Nominee	Frank LaRose	Chelsea Clark
Party	Republican	Democratic
Popular vote	2,444,382	1,635,824
Percentage	59.3%	39.7%
- LaRose: 40–50% 50–60% 60–70% 70–80% 80–90% >90% Clark: 40–50% 50–60% 60–70% 70–80% 80–90% >90% Tie: 40–50% 50% No votes
Secretary of State before election
Frank LaRose
Republican
Elected Secretary of State
Frank LaRose
Republican

Incumbent Republican Frank LaRose ran for re-election. Former member of the Ohio House of Representatives John Adams unsuccessfully challenged him for the Republican nomination.

The only Democratic candidate was Forest Park councilmember Chelsea Clark.

Podcaster Terpsehore Tore Maras, also known as Terpsichore "Tore" Maras-Lindeman, initially challenged LaRose in the primary, but was disqualified. She is now running as an Independent.

LaRose and Clark won their respective primaries on May 3.

LaRose easily won re-election.

== Rhode Island ==
Rhode Island Secretary of State election
- November 8, 2022
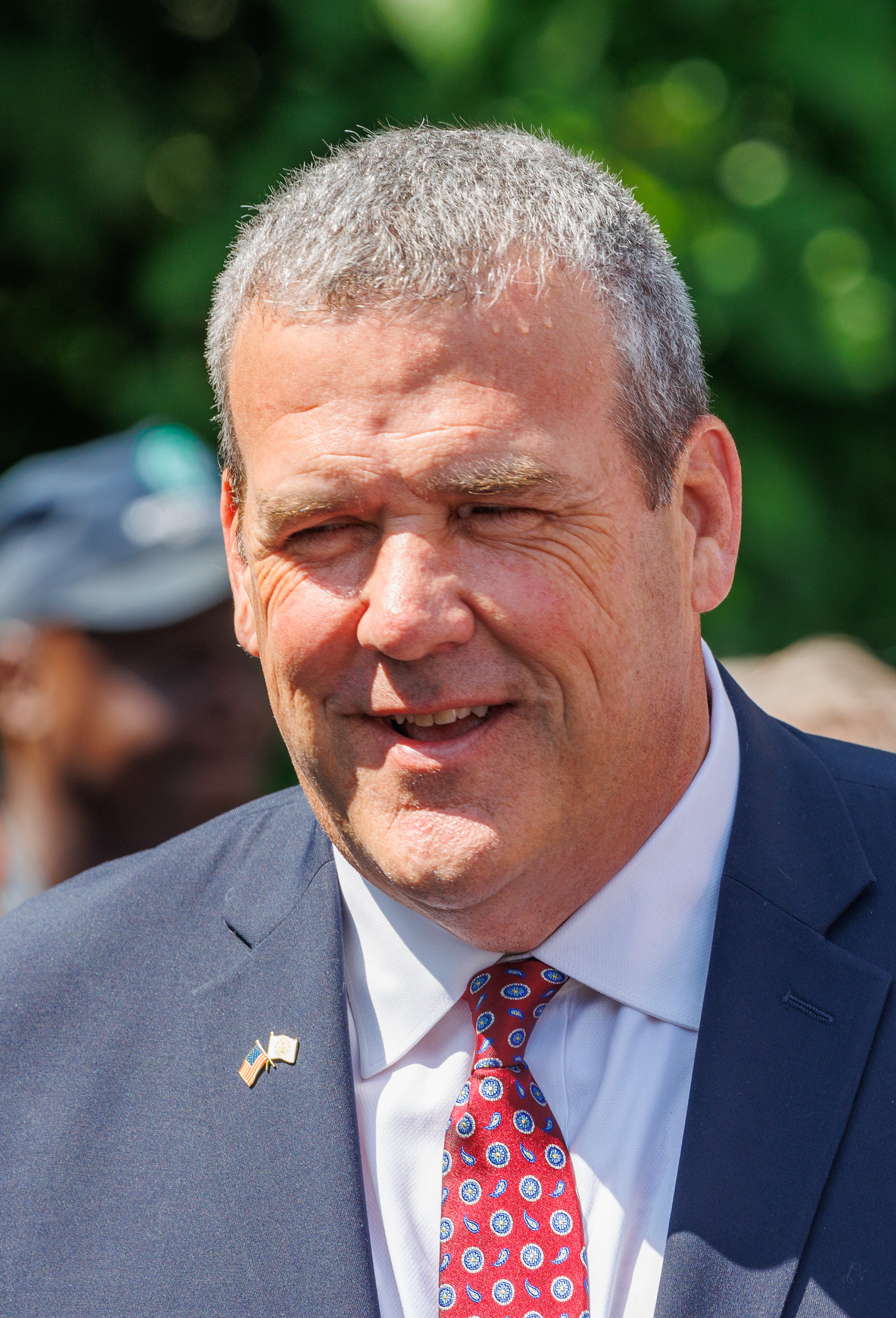

Nominee	Gregg Amore	Pat Cortellessa
Party	Democratic	Republican
Popular vote	208,981	141,457
Percentage	59.5%	40.3%
- Amore: 50–60% 60–70% 70–80% 80–90% Cortellessa: 50–60%
Secretary of State before election
Nellie Gorbea
Democratic
Elected Secretary of State
Gregg Amore
Democratic

Incumbent Democrat Nellie Gorbea was term-limited and couldn't seek a third term. Democratic candidates included state representative Gregg Amore, Stephanie Beaute, and tax preparer Anthony Tamba.

The only Republican candidate was perennial candidate Pat Cortellessa.

Cannabis activist Anne Armstrong ran as an independent.

Amore won the election.

== South Carolina ==
South Carolina Secretary of State election
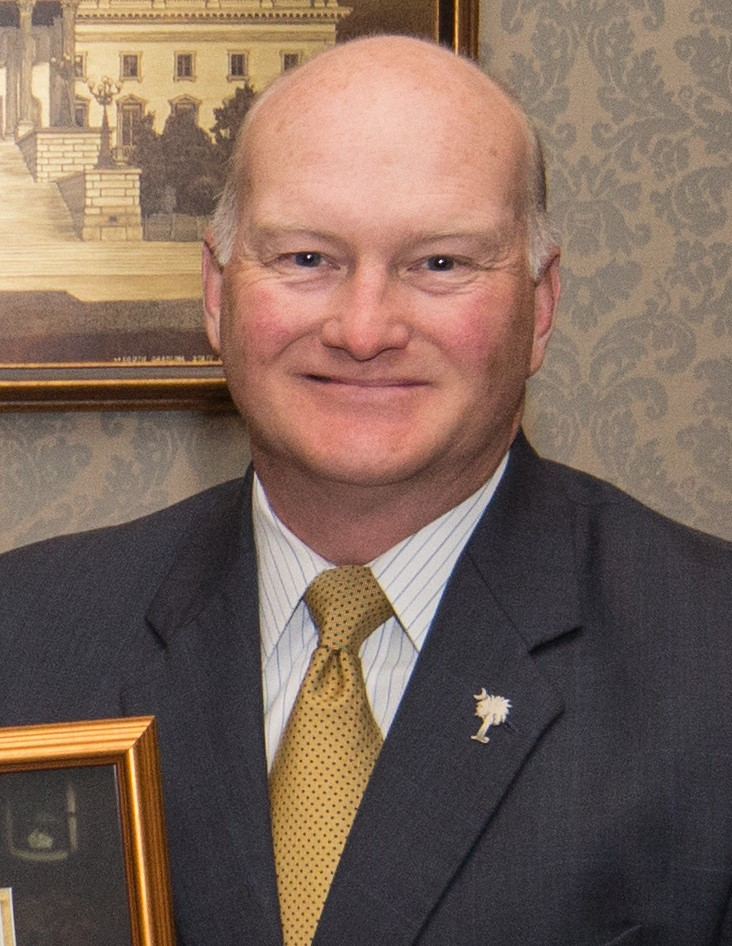

Nominee	Mark Hammond	Rosemounda Peggy Butler
Party	Republican	Democratic
Popular vote	1,071,907	619,089
Percentage	63.4%	36.6%
- Hammond: 50–60% 60–70% 70–80% 80–90% >90% Butler: 40–50% 50–60% 60–70% 70–80% 80–90% >90% No data
Secretary of State before election
Mark Hammond
Republican
Elected Secretary of State
Mark Hammond
Republican

Incumbent Republican Mark Hammond ran for re-election. He faced an unsuccessful primary challenge from businessman Keith Blandford.

The only Democratic primary candidate was Rosemounda Peggy Butler.

Hammond and Butler won their respective primaries on June 14.

Hammond won re-election.

== South Dakota ==
South Dakota Secretary of State election
Nominee	Monae Johnson	Thomas Cool
Party	Republican	Democratic
Popular vote	212,320	119,961
Percentage	63.9%	36.1%
- County results Johnson: 50–60% 60–70% 70–80% 80–90% >90% Cool: 50–60% 60–70% 70–80% 80–90%
Secretary of State before election
Steve Barnett
Republican
Elected Secretary of State
Monae Johnson
Republican

Incumbent Republican Steve Barnett ran for re-election. He faced a successful primary challenge from secretary of state office worker Monae Johnson, who won the nomination at the Republican state convention on June 25.

Thomas Cool was the Democratic nominee.

Barnett won re-election.

== Vermont ==
Vermont Secretary of State election
- November 8, 2022
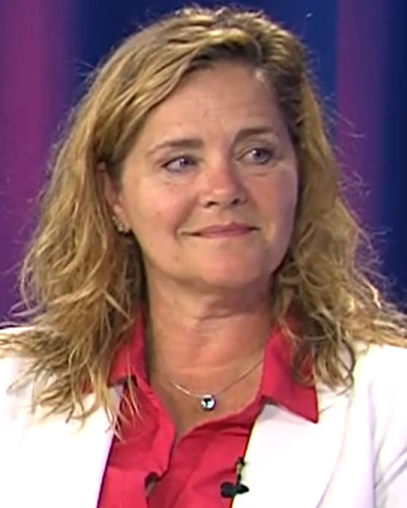

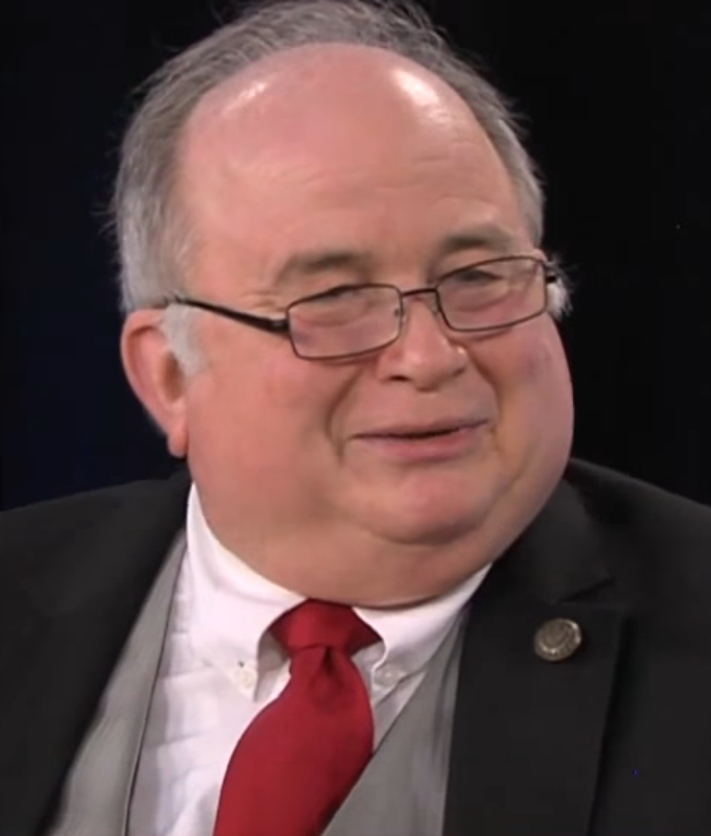
Nominee	Sarah Copeland-Hanzas	H. Brooke Paige
Party	Democratic	Republican
Popular vote	179,087	95,666
Percentage	61.3%	32.8%
- County results Copeland-Hanzas: 40–50% 50–60% 60–70% Paige: 50–60%
Secretary of State before election
Jim Condos
Democratic
Elected Secretary of State
Sarah Copeland-Hanzas
Democratic

Incumbent Democrat Jim Condos retired. Democratic candidates included state representative Sarah Copeland-Hanzas, Montpelier city clerk John Odum, and Deputy Secretary of State Chris Winters. Copeland-Hanzas won the August 9 primary. The only Republican candidate was perennial candidate H. Brooke Paige. Robert Millar ran as the candidate of the Vermont Progressive Party.

Copeland-Hanzas won the general election.

== Washington (special) ==
Washington Secretary of State special election
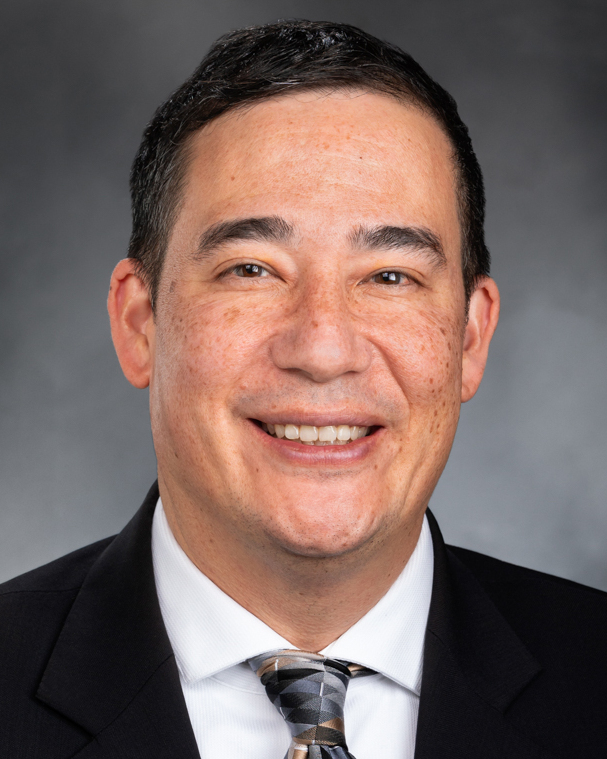

Nominee	Steve Hobbs	Julie Anderson
Party	Democratic	Nonpartisan
Popular vote	1,468,521	1,351,926
Percentage	49.8%	45.8%
- County results Hobbs: 40–50% 50–60% 60–70% Anderson: 40–50% 50–60% 60–70% 70–80%
Secretary of State before election
Steve Hobbs
Democratic
Elected Secretary of State
Steve Hobbs
Democratic

Incumbent Democrat Steve Hobbs was appointed November 22, 2021, after his predecessor, Kim Wyman, resigned. He is running in the special election. He faced an intraparty primary challenge from Marquez Tiggs.

Republican candidates included conspiracy theorist Tamborine Borrelli, Bob Hagglund, former state senator Mark Miloscia, and state senator Keith Wagoner.

Kurtis Engle ran as the candidate of the Union Party, while Pierce County auditor Julie Anderson ran as a nonpartisan.

Hobbs and Anderson advanced from the all-party primary to the general election on August 2.

State representative Brad Klippert, formerly a candidate for congress, ran a write-in campaign.

Hobbs narrowly won the general election.

== Wisconsin ==
Wisconsin Secretary of State election
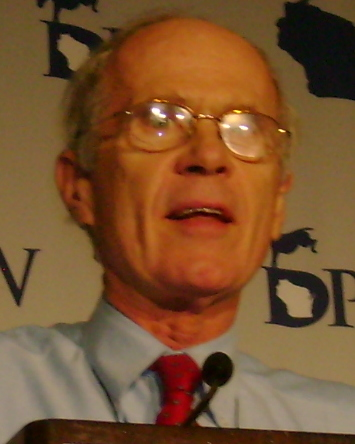

Nominee	Doug La Follette	Amy Loudenbeck
Party	Democratic	Republican
Popular vote	1,268,748	1,261,306
Percentage	48.3%	48.0%
- County results La Follette: 40–50% 50–60% 60–70% 70–80% Loudenbeck: 40–50% 50–60% 60–70% 70–80%
Secretary of State before election
Doug La Follette
Democratic
Elected Secretary of State
Doug La Follette
Democratic

Incumbent Democrat Doug La Follette ran for re-election. Dane County Democratic party chair Alexia Sabor challenged him in the Democratic primary.

Republican candidates included assemblywoman Amy Loudenbeck, former firefighter Daniel Schmidtka, and businessman Jay Schroeder.

Neil Harmon ran as a Libertarian, while Sharyl McFarland ran as an independent.

La Follette and Loudenbeck won their respective primaries on August 9.

La Follette barely won re-election.

== Wyoming ==
Wyoming Secretary of State election
- November 8, 2022
Nominee	Chuck Gray	Write-ins
Party	Republican
Popular vote	147,368	13,574
Percentage	91.57%	8.43%
- County results Gray: 70–80% 80–90% >90%
Secretary of State before election
Karl Allred (acting)
Republican
Elected Secretary of State
Chuck Gray
Republican

Incumbent Republican Edward Buchanan did not seek re-election and resigned before the end of his term. Governor Mark Gordon appointed Karl Allred to serve as interim secretary. Allred is not on the general election ballot.

Republican primary candidates included geologist Mark Armstrong, state representative Chuck Gray, and state senator Tara Nethercott.

Gray won the primary on August 16. He also won the general election.
