= 2026 Connecticut Secretary of the State election =

- November 3, 2026
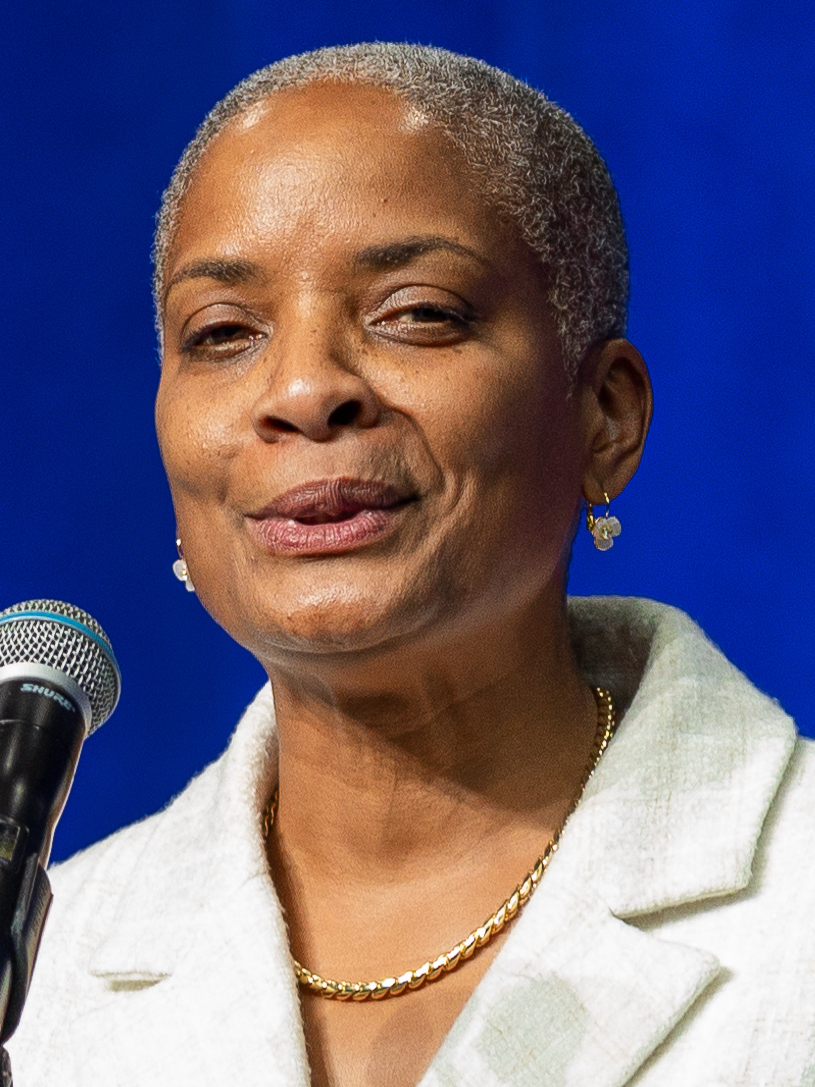

Nominee	Stephanie Thomas	Peter Lumaj
Party	Democratic	Republican
Alliance	Parties: Working Families; Independent
Popular vote	809,177	465,823
Percentage	63.46%	36.53%
- Thomas: 50–60% 60–70% 70–80% 80–90% 90–100% Lumaj: 50–60% 60–70%
Secretary of the State before election
Stephanie Thomas
Democratic
Elected Secretary of the State
Stephanie Thomas
Democratic

The 2026 Connecticut Secretary of the State election was held on November 3, 2026, to elect the Secretary of the State of Connecticut. Primary elections were held on August 11, 2026.

Incumbent Democratic secretary of the state Stephanie Thomas, who was elected in 2022 with 55.2% of the vote, won re-election to a second term in office.

== Democratic primary ==
=== Candidates ===
==== Nominee ====
- Stephanie Thomas, incumbent secretary of the state

== Republican primary ==
=== Candidates ===
==== Nominee ====
- Peter Lumaj, nominee for secretary of the state in 2014

== General election ==
=== Predictions ===
Source	Ranking	As of
Sabato's Crystal Ball	Safe D	October 29, 2026

=== Results ===
2026 Connecticut Secretary of State election
Party	Candidate	Votes	%	±%
Democratic	Stephanie Thomas	748,614	58.78	+5.34
Working Families	Stephanie Thomas	33,673	2.64	+0.87
Independent Party	Stephanie Thomas	25,690	2.02	N/A
Total	Stephanie Thomas (incumbent)	807,977	63.44	+8.22
Republican	Peter Lumaj	465,617	36.56	−6.17
Independent	Matthew Hallock (write-in)	19	0.00	N/A
Total votes		1,273,613	100.00	
