= Stephanie Thomas (politician) =

American politician

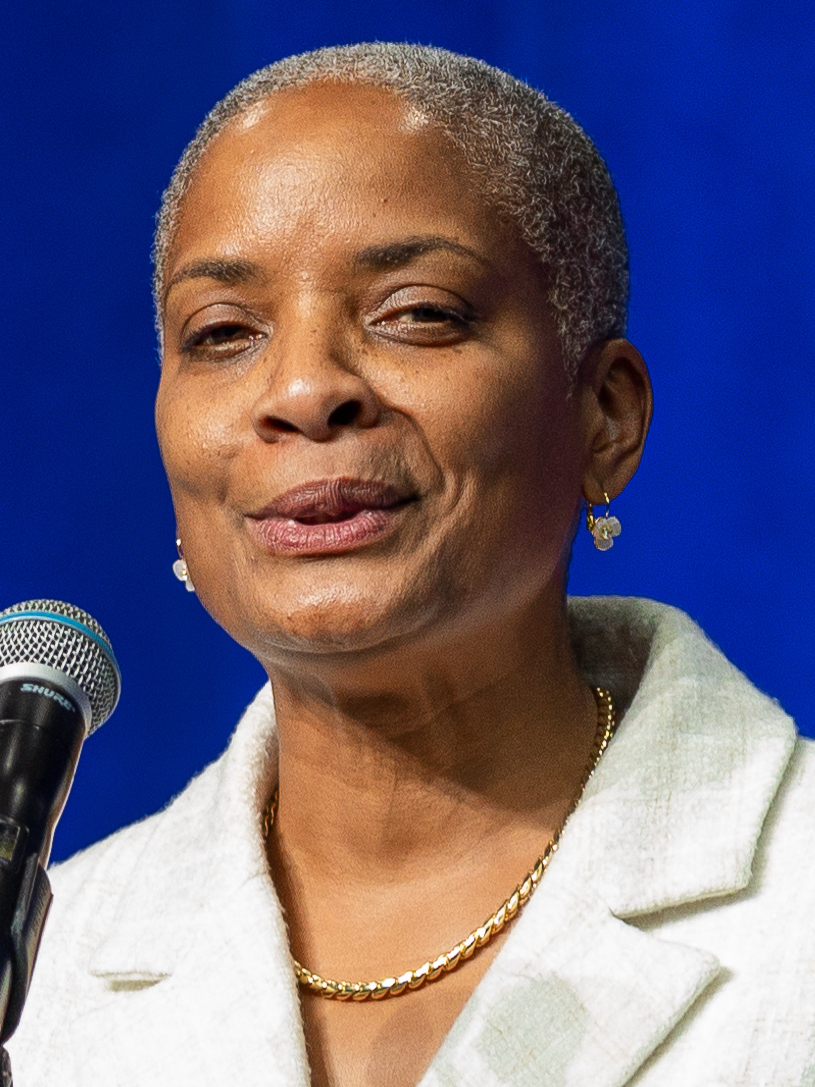
- Thomas in 2023

75th Secretary of the State of Connecticut
- Incumbent
- Assumed office January 4, 2023
- Governor: Ned Lamont
- Preceded by: Mark Kohler

Member of the Connecticut House of Representatives from the 143rd district
- In office January 6, 2021 – January 4, 2023
- Preceded by: Gail Lavielle
- Succeeded by: Dominique Johnson

Personal details
- Born: 1968 or 1969 (age 57–58)
- Party: Democratic
- Education: New York University (BS); New School (MS)
- Website: State House website Campaign website

Stephanie Thomas (born 1968 or 1969) is an American politician and former nonprofit executive who has served as the 75th secretary of the state of Connecticut since January 2023. A Democrat, she previously represented the 143rd district in the Connecticut House of Representatives from 2021 to 2023.

Thomas is the fourteenth woman and first African-American woman to serve as Secretary of the State of Connecticut.

== Education ==
As a high school student, Thomas volunteered for organizations including Mothers Against Drunk Driving and the Special Olympics. Thomas earned a bachelor's degree in sociology from New York University. She later received a master's degree in nonprofit management from The New School.

== Career ==
=== Early career ===
Prior to becoming a state legislator, she was a consultant active in the nonprofit sector for 26 years. She founded and owns Stetwin Consulting, a Norwalk-based consulting firm that advises nonprofits on fundraising strategies. Prior to running for the state legislature, she was a member of the Norwalk Democratic Town Committee.

=== Connecticut House of Representatives ===
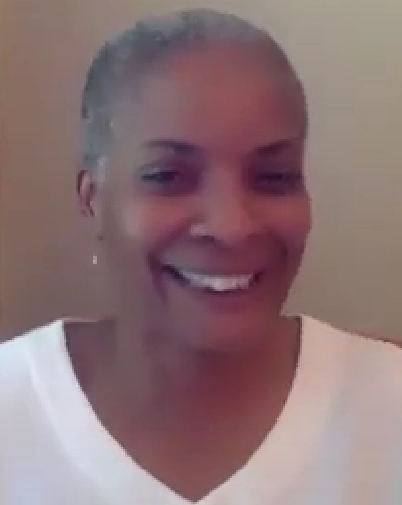
Thomas in 2020

==== 2018 candidacy ====
In 2018, Thomas ran to represent the 143rd district in the Connecticut House of Representatives. She ran as a political newcomer against Republican incumbent Gail Lavielle, who had been expected to run unopposed up until the final days of the filing deadline. Her candidacy was supported by the Connecticut Working Families Party.

==== 2020 election and tenure ====
Thomas decided to mount another candidacy to represent the district in the 2020 election. She announced her candidacy in February 2020, and expressed her intention to run against Lavielle. However, Lavielle decided to forgo a bid for reelection, and supported fellow Republican Patrizia Zucaro's candidacy to succeed her.

Thomas ultimately won the general election against Zucaro She took office on January 6, 2021. As a member of the state house, Thomas served as a member of both the Commerce and Transportation Committees, as well as the Government Administration and Elections Committee.

2020 Connecticut State House of Representatives election, District 143
Party	Candidate	Votes	%
Democratic	Stephanie Thomas	8,105	53.70
Republican	Patrizia Zucaro	6,409	42.47
Independent Party	Patrizia Zucaro	321	2.13
Working Families	Stephanie Thomas	257	1.70
Total votes		15,092	100.00
Democratic gain from Republican			

=== Secretary of the State ===
==== 2022 election ====
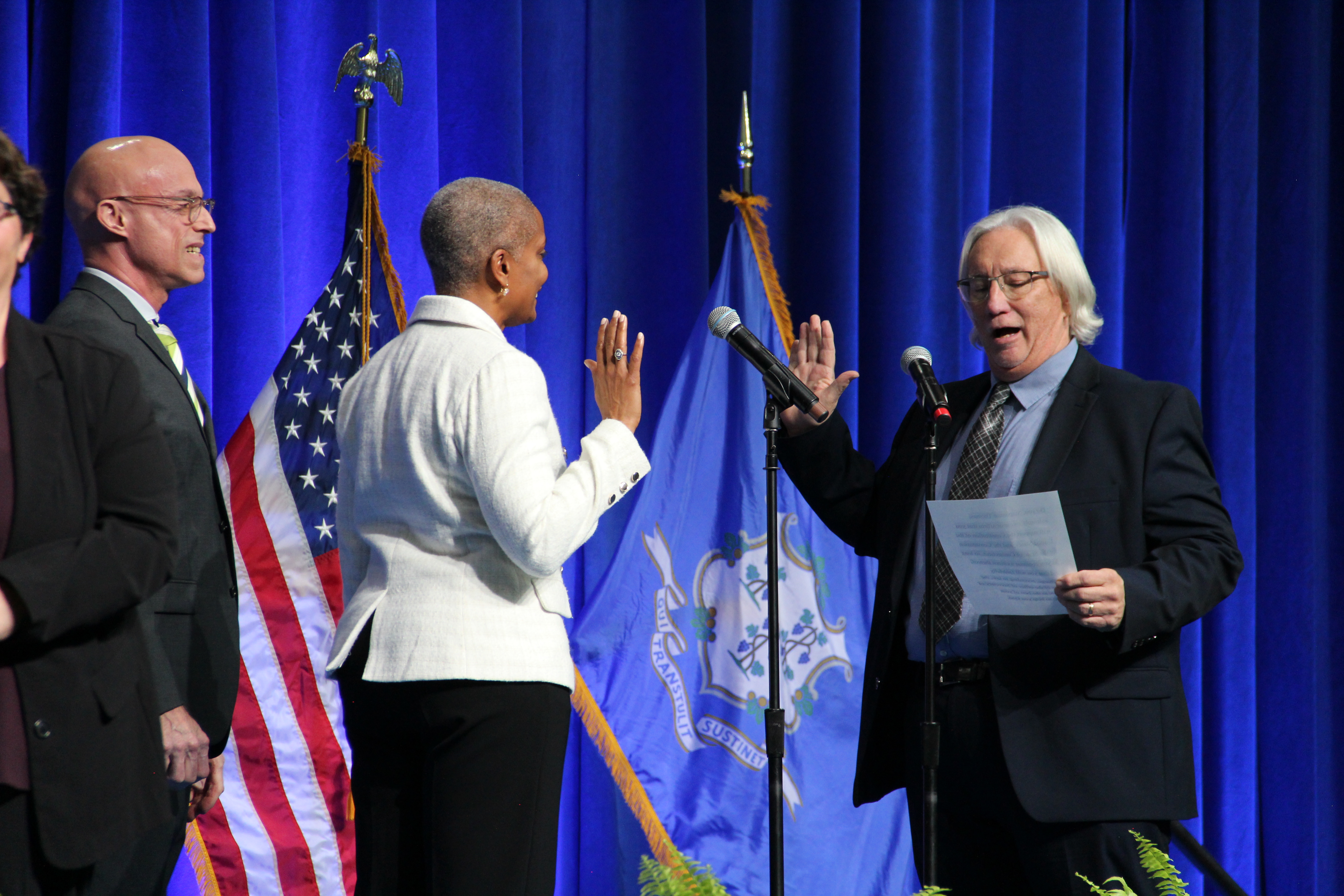
Thomas being sworn in as Secretary of the State on January 4, 2023

Thomas ran for the position of Secretary of the State in the 2022 election after incumbent Denise Merrill declined to run for a fourth term in office. Thomas faced Maritza Bond, health director of New Haven, in the Democratic primary. Bond received the endorsements of several labor unions, while Thomas received the endorsement of the state Democratic Party.

During the primary campaign, Bond criticized Thomas for missing a legislative vote related to state employees' union contracts. She defended her record, noting the labor endorsements she received during her state house candidacy. She stated she missed the vote due to work-related duties at her day job leading a nonprofit.

Thomas ultimately won the nomination against Bond. In the general election, Thomas ran on a platform that supported expanding access to voting. Thomas won the general election against Republican opponent Dominic Rapini. Thomas' victory made her the first African-American to serve as Secretary of the State.

2022 Connecticut Secretary of the State election
Party	Candidate	Votes	%	±%
Democratic	Stephanie Thomas	665,631	53.44%	−0.37%
Working Families	Stephanie Thomas	22,083	1.77%	−0.30%
Total	Stephanie Thomas	687,714	55.22%	-0.67%
Republican	Dominic Rapini	532,218	42.73%	+0.27%
Independent Party	Cynthia Jennings	25,488	2.05%	N/A
Total votes		1,245,420	100.0%	
Democratic hold				

==== Tenure ====
Following the controversial 2023 Bridgeport mayoral election, which was surrounded by allegations of voting irregularities, Thomas weighed in in support of proposed state legislation to increase election oversight. In 2024, Thomas presided over the launch of the NextGen Elections program, which aims to recruit college students to become election workers.

In 2024, Thomas testified before the state legislature on the need to protect election workers from security threats. Under Thomas, the Secretary of the State's office has led an outreach campaign to help Connecticut residents identify election misinformation and disinformation.

Party political offices
Preceded by Denise Merrill	Democratic nominee for Secretary of the State of Connecticut; 2022, 2026	Most recent
Political offices
Preceded by Mark Kohler	Secretary of State of Connecticut; 2023–present	Incumbent
