= Mark Kohler =

Secretary of the State of Connecticut

74th Secretary of the State of Connecticut
- In office July 1, 2022 – January 4, 2023
- Governor: Ned Lamont
- Preceded by: Denise Merrill
- Succeeded by: Stephanie Thomas

Personal details
- Born: July 30, 1960 (age 66)
- Party: Democratic
- Education: University of St. Thomas (BA); Indiana University Bloomington (MA); University of Connecticut (JD)

Mark F. Kohler (born July 30, 1960) is an American lawyer and politician who served as the 74th Secretary of the State of Connecticut from July 1, 2022, when he was appointed by Governor Ned Lamont to fill the vacancy created by previous secretary Denise Merrill's resignation until the end of the term in January 2023. He previously served as an associate attorney general in the Office of the Connecticut Attorney General and as a member of the Town of Woodbridge Zoning Board of Appeals.

== Education ==
Kohler graduated from the University of St. Thomas (then known as the College of St. Thomas) with his Bachelor of Arts in 1982. He then earned his Master of Arts in Political Science from Indiana University Bloomington in 1984, followed by his Juris Doctor from the University of Connecticut School of Law in 1987.

== Career ==
=== Early Career and Connecticut Attorney General's Office ===
Kohler was an associate attorney with the law firm Shipman & Goodwin for two years, from 1990 until 1992. Afterwards, he joined the Connecticut Attorney General's Office, where he served for 30 years under attorneys general Richard Blumenthal, George Jepsen, and William Tong. At different points during his tenure, Kohler served as head of the finance department, public utilities unit, and the special litigation department. He also served on the Zoning Board of Appeals in Woodbridge, Connecticut for three years, between 2006 and 2009.

=== Secretary of the State of Connecticut ===
Shortly after retiring in early 2022, Kohler was appointed Secretary of the State of Connecticut by Governor Ned Lamont when retiring incumbent Denise Merrill resigned June 30, six months before the expiration of her term. He was sworn in the next day. He was not a candidate in the election for the office in November 2022.

Political offices
Preceded by Denise Merrill	Secretary of State of Connecticut; 2022–2023	Succeeded by Stephanie Thomas
