= 2022 Connecticut Secretary of the State election =

2022 Connecticut Secretary of State election
- November 8, 2022
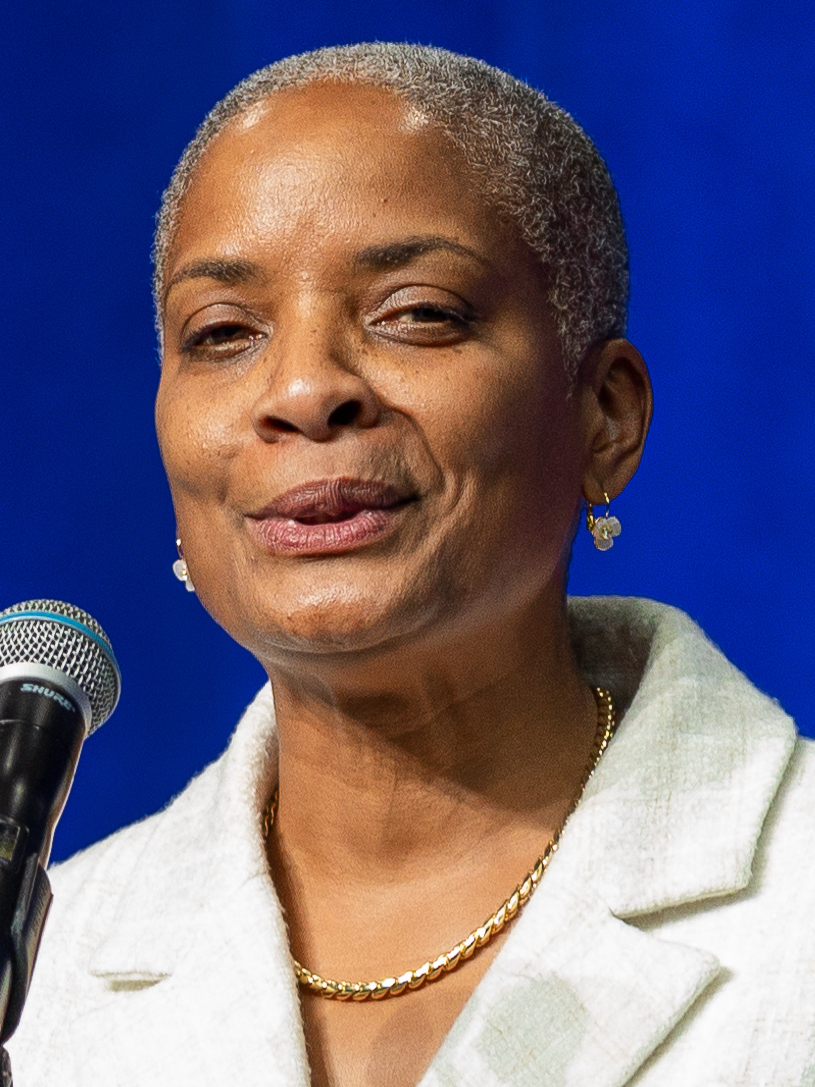

Nominee	Stephanie Thomas	Dominic Rapini
Party	Democratic	Republican
Alliance	Working Families
Popular vote	687,714	532,218
Percentage	55.22%	42.73%
- Thomas: 40–50% 50–60% 60–70% 70–80% 80–90% Rapini: 40–50% 50–60% 60–70%
Secretary of State before election
Mark Kohler
Democratic
Elected Secretary of State
Stephanie Thomas
Democratic

The 2022 Connecticut Secretary of the State election took place on November 8, 2022, to elect the next Secretary of the State of Connecticut. Incumbent Democrat Denise Merrill planned to retire at the end of her elected term, but resigned on June 30 to care for her ailing husband. Governor Lamont appointed former associate attorney general Mark Kohler to the position. Kohler was sworn in on July 11. He was not a candidate for the office in the November election.

== Democratic primary ==
=== Candidates ===
==== Nominee ====
- Stephanie Thomas, state representative from the 143rd district (2021–2023)

==== Eliminated in primary ====
- Maritza Bond, New Haven health director

==== Withdrawn ====
- Darryl Brackeen Jr., New Haven alderman (running for state house)
- Josh Elliott, state representative from the 88th district (2017–present) (running for re-election)
- Matt Lesser, state senator from the 9th district (2019–present)
- Hilda Santiago, state representative from the 84th district (2013–present)

==== Declined ====
- Mark Kohler, incumbent secretary of the state

=== Controversy ===
During Matt Lesser's election bid for Secretary of the State in 2022, he faced backlash for attempting to change the order of balloting at the Democratic State Convention in the final hours.

Lesser pushed to have his race listed at the top rather than the bottom, a strategic move driven by the belief that his chances of endorsement might diminish if several white male candidates were considered before him.

Notably, two leading contenders for the endorsement were women of color, one of whom eventually became the nominee, Stephanie Thomas, the current Secretary of State.

=== Endorsements ===
Maritza Bond

Local officials

- Justin Elicker, mayor of New Haven
- Matthew Hoey, Guilford first selectman

Labor unions

- Connecticut AFL–CIO
Matt Lesser (withdrawn)

Organizations

- Connecticut Working Families Party

Labor unions

- United Auto Workers
Stephanie Thomas

Statewide officials

- Denise Merrill, former Secretary of the State of Connecticut (2011–2022)

State legislators

- Jorge Cabrera, state senator
- Josh Elliott, state representative

Local officials

- Lauren Garrett, mayor of Hamden

Organizations

- Democratic Party of Connecticut
Declined to endorse

Statewide officials

- Ned Lamont, governor of Connecticut

=== Results ===
Democratic primary results
Party	Candidate	Votes	%
Democratic	Stephanie Thomas	84,392	75.81%
Democratic	Maritza Bond	26,929	24.19%
Total votes		111,321	100.0%

== Republican primary ==
=== Candidates ===
==== Nominee ====
- Dominic Rapini, senior account manager at Apple and candidate for U.S. Senate in 2018

==== Eliminated in primary ====
- Terrie Wood, state representative from the 141st district (2009–present)

==== Withdrawn ====
- Brock Weber, executive aide to New Britain mayor Erin Stewart

=== Endorsements ===
Dominic Rapini

Organizations

- Connecticut Republican Party

=== Results ===
Republican primary results
Party	Candidate	Votes	%
Republican	Dominic Rapini	51,080	58.23%
Republican	Terrie Wood	36,634	41.77%
Total votes		87,714	100.0

== Independent Party of Connecticut primary ==
=== Candidates ===
==== Nominee ====
- Cynthia Jennings, environmental attorney

== Libertarian primary ==
=== Nominee ===
- Stephen Dincher, chairman of the Libertarian Party of Connecticut

== Green primary ==
=== Nominee ===
- Douglas Lary

== General election ==
=== Debate ===
2022 Connecticut Secretary of the State debate
No.	Date	Host	Moderator	Link	Democratic	Republican	Libertarian	Green	Independent Party of Connecticut
Key: P Participant A Absent N Not invited I Invited W Withdrawn									
Key: P Participant A Absent N Not invited I Invited W Withdrawn					Stephanie Thomas	Dominic Rapini	Stephen Dincher	Douglas Lary	Cynthia Jennings
1	Oct. 25, 2022	Connecticut Public; Broadcasting	Walter Smith; Randolph	YouTube	P	P	N	N	N

=== Predictions ===
Source	Ranking	As of
Sabato's Crystal Ball	Safe D	December 1, 2021
Elections Daily	Safe D	November 7, 2022

=== Results ===
2022 Connecticut Secretary of the State election
Party	Candidate	Votes	%	±%
Democratic	Stephanie Thomas	665,631	53.44%	−0.37%
Working Families	Stephanie Thomas	22,083	1.77%	−0.30%
Total	Stephanie Thomas	687,714	55.22%	-0.67%
Republican	Dominic Rapini	532,218	42.73%	+0.27%
Independent Party	Cynthia Jennings	25,488	2.05%	N/A
Total votes		1,245,420	100.0%	
Democratic hold				

==== By county ====
County	Stephanie Thomas Democratic		Dominic Rapini Republican		Other parties Independent		Total votes cast
County	#	%	#	%	#	%	Total votes cast
Fairfield	172,419	56.18%	128,813	41.97%	5,650	1.84%	306,882
Hartford	173,961	58.28%	117,869	39.49%	6,674	2.24%	298,504
Litchfield	34,687	43.95%	42,609	53.99%	1,620	2.05%	78,916
Middlesex	38,490	53.38%	32,125	44.55%	1,490	2.07%	72,105
New Haven	147,734	53.71%	121,957	44.34%	5,351	1.95%	275,042
New London	51,664	53.67%	42,159	43.79%	2,448	2.54%	96,271
Tolland	29,647	51.27%	26,879	46.48%	1,297	2.24%	57,823
Windham	17,029	45.06%	19,807	52.41%	958	2.53%	37,794
Totals	665,631	54.41%	532,218	43.51%	25,488	2.08%	1,223,337

Counties that flipped from Democratic to Republican

- Windham (largest town: Windham)

==== By congressional district ====
Thomas won all five congressional districts.

District	Thomas	Rapini	Representative
1st	60%	37%	John B. Larson
2nd	53%	45%	Joe Courtney
3rd	56%	42%	Rosa DeLauro
4th	58%	40%	Jim Himes
5th	50%	48%	Jahana Hayes
