= 2026 United States secretary of state elections =

- November 3, 2026

26 secretary of state offices (Note: Seat tallies and popular vote do not include states that do not elect secretaries of state.)
| | Majority party | Minority party |
|---|---|---|
| Party | Democratic | Republican |
| Seats before | 16 | 19 |
| Seats after | 19 | 16 |
| Seat change | ▲3 | ▼3 |
| Seats up | 13 | 13 |
| Seats won | 16 | 10 |
- Democratic hold Democratic gain Republican hold No election

The 2026 United States secretary of state elections were held on November 3, 2026, to elect the secretary of state of twenty-six U.S. states.

The previous secretary of state elections for this group of states took place in 2022. The secretary of state of Vermont serves two-year terms and was last elected in 2024.

These elections will take place concurrently with various other federal, state, and local elections.

== Partisan composition ==
Going into these elections, this class of secretaries of state is made up of 13 Democrats and 13 Republicans. Democrats are defending four states won by Donald Trump in 2024 (Arizona, Michigan, Nevada, and Wisconsin), while Republicans do not hold any states won by Kamala Harris.

== Retirements ==
Map of retirements: Republican incumbent ran Democratic incumbent ran Republican incumbent term-limited, retired, or lost renomination Democratic incumbent term-limited or retired No election

There are 10 incumbent secretaries of state (six Republicans and four Republicans) retiring, of which four incumbent secretaries of state (three Democrats and one Republican) are term-limited. One Republican secretary of state is ineligible to run. (Note: The Arkansas State Constitution prohibits appointees from running for election.) The remaining five incumbent secretaries of state (four Republicans and one Democrat) have announced they are not seeking reelection.

=== Democratic ===
1. Colorado: Jena Griswold is term-limited after 2 terms.
2. Michigan: Jocelyn Benson is term-limited after 2 terms.
3. New Mexico: Maggie Toulouse Oliver is term-limited after 2 full terms.
4. Wisconsin: Sarah Godlewski is retiring to run for lieutenant governor.

=== Republican ===
1. Alabama: Wes Allen is retiring to run for lieutenant governor.
2. Arkansas: Cole Jester is ineligible to run.
3. Georgia: Brad Raffensperger is retiring to run for governor.
4. Kansas: Scott Schwab is retiring to run for governor.
5. Ohio: Frank LaRose is term-limited after 2 terms.
6. Wyoming: Chuck Gray is retiring to run for U.S. House.

== Incumbents defeated ==
=== In primary elections or conventions ===
==== Republicans ====
Three Republicans lost renomination.

1. Indiana: Diego Morales lost renomination to Max Engling.
2. Nebraska: Bob Evnen lost renomination to Scott Petersen.
3. South Dakota: Monae Johnson lost renomination to Heather Baxter.

== Predictions ==
Several sites and individuals published predictions of competitive seats. These predictions looked at factors such as the strength of the incumbent (if the incumbent was running for reelection) and the other candidates, and the state's partisan lean (reflected in part by the state's Cook Partisan Voting Index rating). The predictions assigned ratings to each seat, indicating the predicted advantage that a party had in winning that seat. In 2025, Republicans appeared to have the advantage, with most competitive seats being Democratic-held. By the time of the general election, however, a number of races shifted towards Democrats, both due to their improving national standings as well as Republicans' nominations of election deniers in several states. Most election predictors used:

- "tossup": no advantage
- "lean": slight advantage
- "likely": significant, but surmountable, advantage
- "safe": near-certain chance of victory

| Constituency | | Incumbent | | Ratings | Result |
| State | PVI | Secretary of State | Last election (Note: The last elections for this group of secretary of states, with the exception of Vermont, were in 2022, except for those who became secretary of states after their predecessor's resignation.) | Sabato Oct. 29, 2026 | Result |
|---|---|---|---|---|---|
| Alabama | R+15 | Wes Allen (retiring) | 65.88% R | Safe R | TBD |
| Arizona | R+2 | Adrian Fontes | 52.38% D | Likely D | TBD |
| Arkansas | R+15 | Cole Jester (ineligible to run) | Appointed (2025) (Note: Republican John Thurston won with 67.05% of the vote in 2022, but resigned on January 1, 2025, after being elected Arkansas State Treasurer in 2024.) | Safe R | TBD |
| California | D+12 | Shirley Weber | 60.05% D | Safe D | TBD |
| Colorado | D+6 | Jena Griswold (term-limited) | 55.10% D | Safe D | TBD |
| Connecticut | D+8 | Stephanie Thomas | 55.22% D | Safe D | TBD |
| Georgia | R+1 | Brad Raffensperger (retiring) | 53.23% R | Tossup | TBD |
| Idaho | R+18 | Phil McGrane | 72.12% R | Safe R | TBD |
| Illinois | D+6 | Alexi Giannoulias | 54.28% D | Safe D | TBD |
| Indiana | R+9 | Diego Morales (lost renomination) | 54.13% R | Lean D (flip) | TBD |
| Iowa | R+6 | Paul Pate | 60.05% R | Tossup | TBD |
| Kansas | R+8 | Scott Schwab (retiring) | 58.36% R | Lean R | TBD |
| Massachusetts | D+14 | William F. Galvin | 67.69% D | Safe D | TBD |
| Michigan | EVEN | Jocelyn Benson (term-limited) | 55.86% D | Lean D | TBD |
| Minnesota | D+3 | Steve Simon | 54.53% DFL | Lean D | TBD |
| Nebraska | R+10 | Bob Evnen (lost renomination) | 100.0% R (Note: Evnen ran unopposed in 2022.) | Lean R | TBD |
| Nevada | R+1 | Cisco Aguilar | 48.95% D | Likely D | TBD |
| New Mexico | D+4 | Maggie Toulouse Oliver (term-limited) | 54.52% D | Safe D | TBD |
| North Dakota | R+18 | Michael Howe | 63.22% R | Safe R | TBD |
| Ohio | R+5 | Frank LaRose (term-limited) | 59.29% R | Tossup | TBD |
| Rhode Island | D+8 | Gregg Amore | 59.54% D | Safe D | TBD |
| South Carolina | R+8 | Mark Hammond | 63.33% R | Safe R | TBD |
| South Dakota | R+15 | Monae Johnson (lost renomination) | 63.90% R | Safe R | TBD |
| Vermont | D+17 | Sarah Copeland Hanzas | 59.61% D | Safe D | TBD |
| Wisconsin | EVEN | Sarah Godlewski (retiring) | Appointed (2023) (Note: Democrat Doug La Follette won with 48.30% of the vote in 2022, but resigned on March 17, 2023) | Lean D | TBD |
| Wyoming | R+23 | Chuck Gray (retiring) | 91.57% R | Safe R | TBD |

== Race summary ==
| State | Secretary of state | Party | First elected | Status | Candidates |
|---|---|---|---|---|---|
| Alabama | Wes Allen | Republican | 2022 | Incumbent retired to run for lieutenant governor. Republican hold. | ▌ ✓ Caroleene Dobson (Republican); ▌Wayne Rogers (Democratic) |
| Arizona | Adrian Fontes | Democratic | 2022 | Incumbent re-elected. | ▌ ✓ Adrian Fontes (Democratic); ▌Alexander Kolodin (Republican); ▌Duwayne Collier (Green) |
| Arkansas | Cole Jester | Republican | 2025 (appointed) | Incumbent ineligible to run. Republican hold. | ▌ ✓ Kim Hammer (Republican); ▌Kelly Grappe (Democratic); ▌Michael Pakko (Libertarian) |
| California | Shirley Weber | Democratic | 2021 (Note: Weber took office after her predecessor (Alex Padilla) resigned.) | Incumbent re-elected. | ▌ ✓ Shirley Weber (Democratic); ▌Don Wagner (Republican) |
| Colorado | Jena Griswold | Democratic | 2018 | Incumbent term-limited. Democratic hold. | ▌ ✓ Amanda Gonzalez (Democratic); ▌James Wiley (Republican); ▌Sean Vadney (Libertarian); ▌Amanda Campbell (American Constitution); ▌Celeste Landry (Forward) |
| Connecticut | Stephanie Thomas | Democratic | 2022 | Incumbent re-elected. | ▌ ✓ Stephanie Thomas (Democratic); ▌Peter Lumaj (Republican) |
| Georgia | Brad Raffensperger | Republican | 2018 | Incumbent retired to run for governor. Democratic gain. | ▌ ✓ Penny Brown Reynolds (Democratic); ▌Tim Fleming (Republican) |
| Idaho | Phil McGrane | Republican | 2022 | Incumbent re-elected. | ▌ ✓ Phil McGrane (Republican); ▌Shawn Keenan (Democratic) |
| Illinois | Alexi Giannoulias | Democratic | 2022 | Incumbent re-elected. | ▌ ✓ Alexi Giannoulias (Democratic); ▌Diane Harris (Republican) |
| Indiana | Diego Morales | Republican | 2022 | Incumbent lost renomination. Democratic gain. | ▌ ✓ Beau Bayh (Democratic); ▌Max Engling (Republican); ▌Greg Ballard (Independent); ▌Lauri Shillings (Libertarian) |
| Iowa | Paul Pate | Republican | 2014 | Incumbent re-elected. | ▌ ✓ Paul Pate (Republican); ▌Ryan Peterman (Democratic) |
| Kansas | Scott Schwab | Republican | 2018 | Incumbent retiring to run for governor. | ▌Jennifer Day (Democratic); ▌Scott E. Morgan (United Kansas); ▌Pat Proctor (Republican) |
| Massachusetts | William F. Galvin | Democratic | 1994 | Incumbent re-elected. | ▌ ✓ William F. Galvin (Democratic); ▌Anne Brensley (Republican) |
| Michigan | Jocelyn Benson | Democratic | 2018 | Incumbent term-limited. Democratic hold. | ▌ ✓ Garlin Gilchrist (Democratic); ▌Anthony Forlini (Republican); ▌Christine Sloan (Libertarian); ▌Scott E. Aughney (U.S. Taxpayers); ▌Eric Borregard (Green) |
| Minnesota | Steve Simon | DFL | 2014 | Incumbent re-elected. | ▌ ✓ Steve Simon (Democratic); ▌Tad Jude (Republican); ▌George "Chip" Tangen (Libertarian); ▌Seth Kuhl-Stennes (Green) |
| Nebraska | Bob Evnen | Republican | 2018 | Incumbent lost renomination. Republican hold. | ▌ ✓ Scott Petersen (Republican); ▌Sarah Slattery (Democratic); ▌Paul Rumbaugh (Working People); ▌Bob Krist (America First) |
| Nevada | Cisco Aguilar | Democratic | 2022 | Incumbent re-elected. | ▌ ✓ Cisco Aguilar (Democratic); ▌Jim Marchant (Republican); ▌Brad Lee Barnhill (American Independent); ▌John T. Kennedy (Libertarian) |
| New Mexico | Maggie Toulouse Oliver | Democratic | 2016 (special) | Incumbent term-limited. Democratic hold. | ▌ ✓ Amanda López Askin (Democratic); ▌Ramona Goolsby (Republican) |
| North Dakota | Michael Howe | Republican | 2022 | Incumbent re-elected. | ▌ ✓ Michael Howe (Republican); ▌Ryan Braunberger (Democratic-NPL) |
| Ohio | Frank LaRose | Republican | 2018 | Incumbent term-limited. Democratic gain. | ▌ ✓ Allison Russo (Democratic); ▌Robert Sprague (Republican); ▌Tom Pruss (Libertarian) |
| Rhode Island | Gregg Amore | Democratic | 2022 | Incumbent re-elected. | ▌ ✓ Gregg Amore (Democratic) |
| South Carolina | Mark Hammond | Republican | 2002 | Incumbent re-elected. | ▌ ✓ Mark Hammond (Republican); ▌Jason Belton (Democratic) |
| South Dakota | Monae Johnson | Republican | 2022 | Incumbent lost renomination in convention. Republican hold. | ▌ ✓ Heather Baxter (Republican); ▌Terrence Davis (Democratic); ▌Tamara Lesnar (Libertarian) |
| Vermont | Sarah Copeland Hanzas | Democratic | 2022 | Incumbent re-elected. | ▌ ✓ Sarah Copeland Hanzas (Democratic); ▌Brooke Paige (Republican); ▌Rachel Shaw (Progressive) |
| Wisconsin | Sarah Godlewski | Democratic | 2023 (appointed) | Incumbent retired to run for lieutenant governor. Democratic hold. | ▌ ✓ JoCasta Zamarripa (Democratic); ▌Jay Schroeder (Republican); ▌Pete Karas (Green) |
| Wyoming | Chuck Gray | Republican | 2022 | Incumbent retired to run for U.S. House. Republican hold. | ▌ ✓ Robert Short (Republican); ▌Bryan McCarty (Democratic); ▌Tamara Trujillo (Constitution) |

== Alabama ==
Alabama Secretary of State election

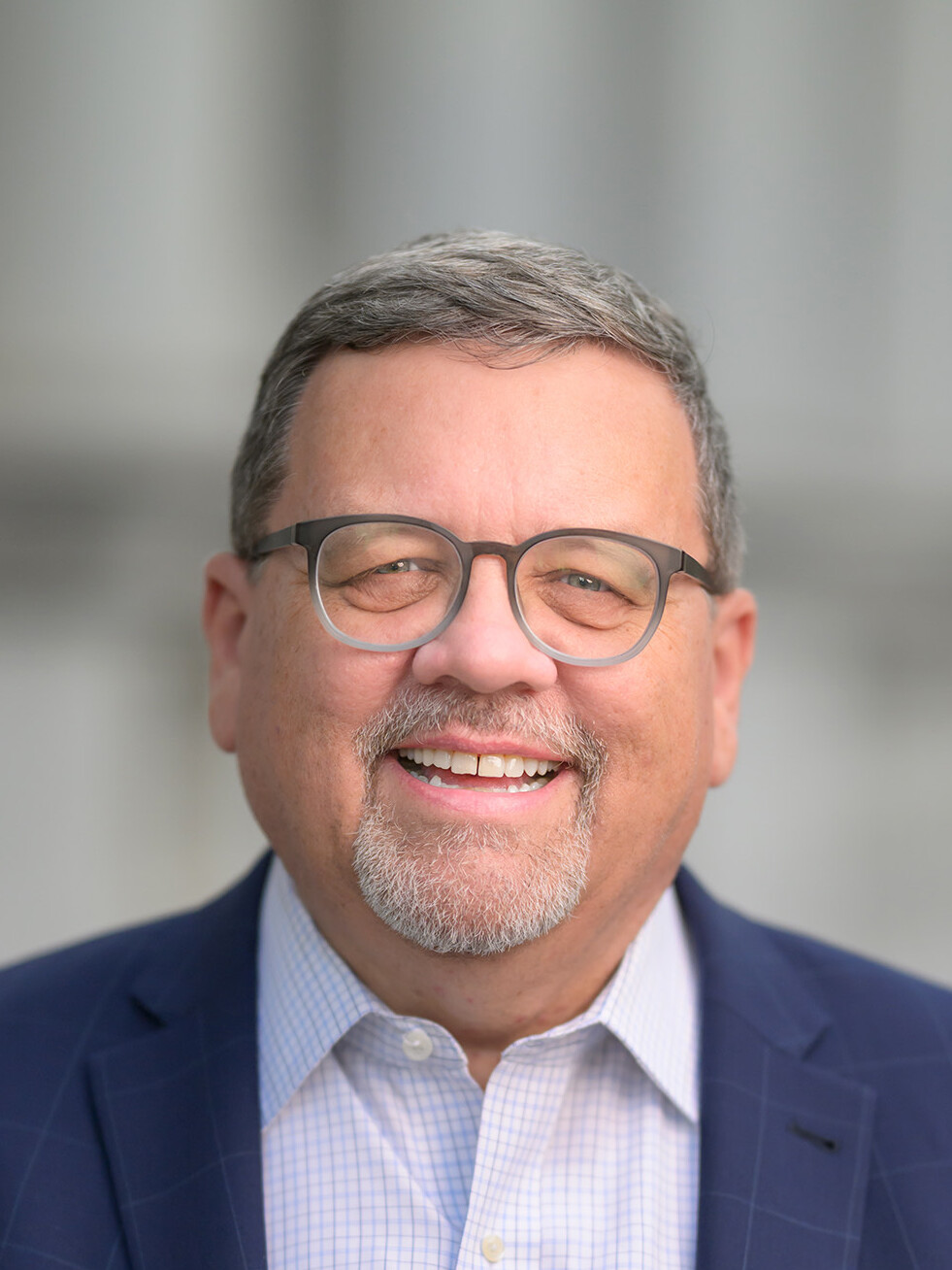
| Nominee | Caroleene Dobson | Wayne Rogers |
| Party | Republican | Democratic |
Incumbent Secretary of State
Wes Allen
Republican

Secretary of State Wes Allen was elected in 2022 with 65.9% of the vote. He is retiring to run for Lieutenant Governor.

== Arizona ==
Arizona Secretary of State election
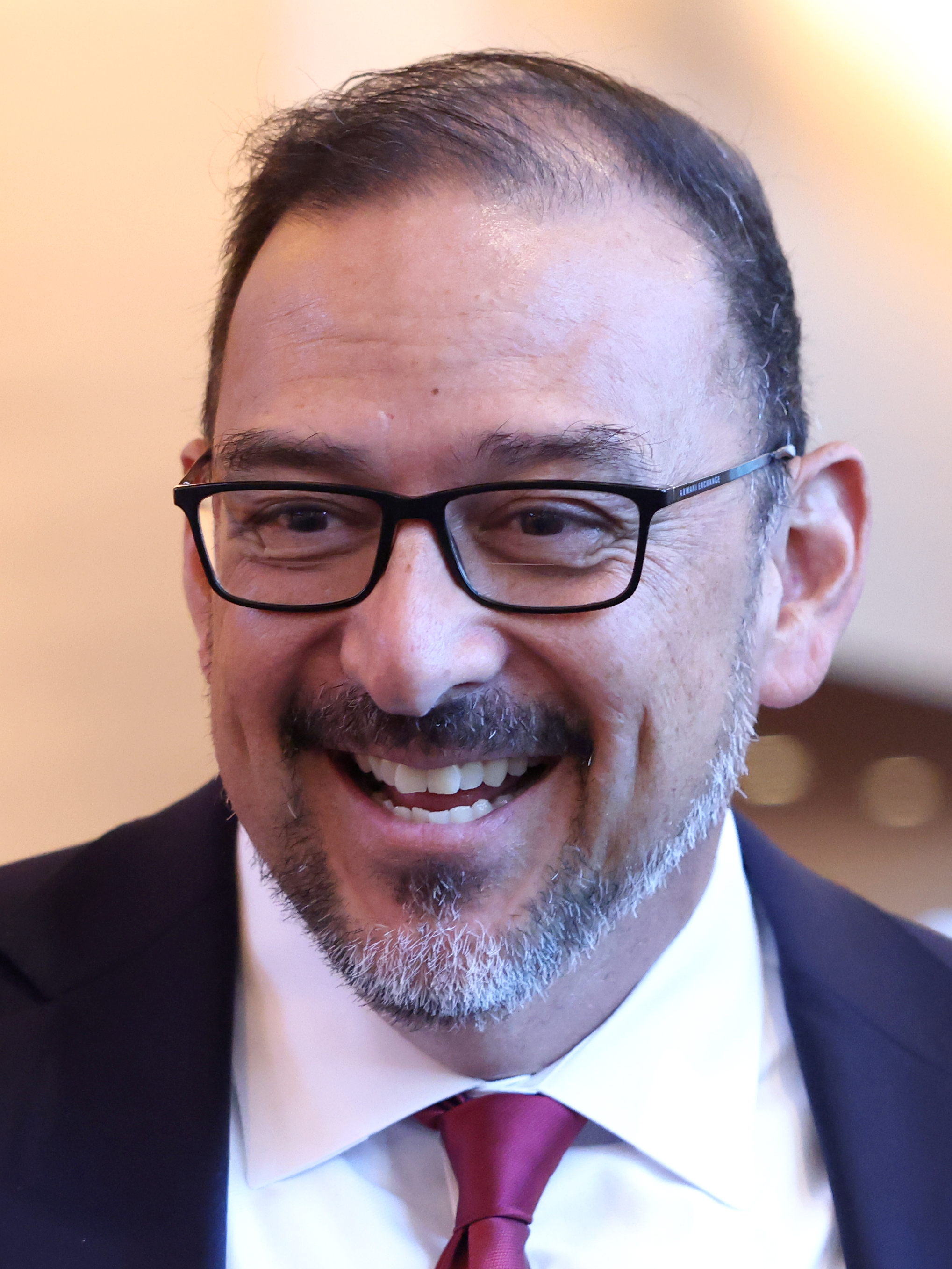

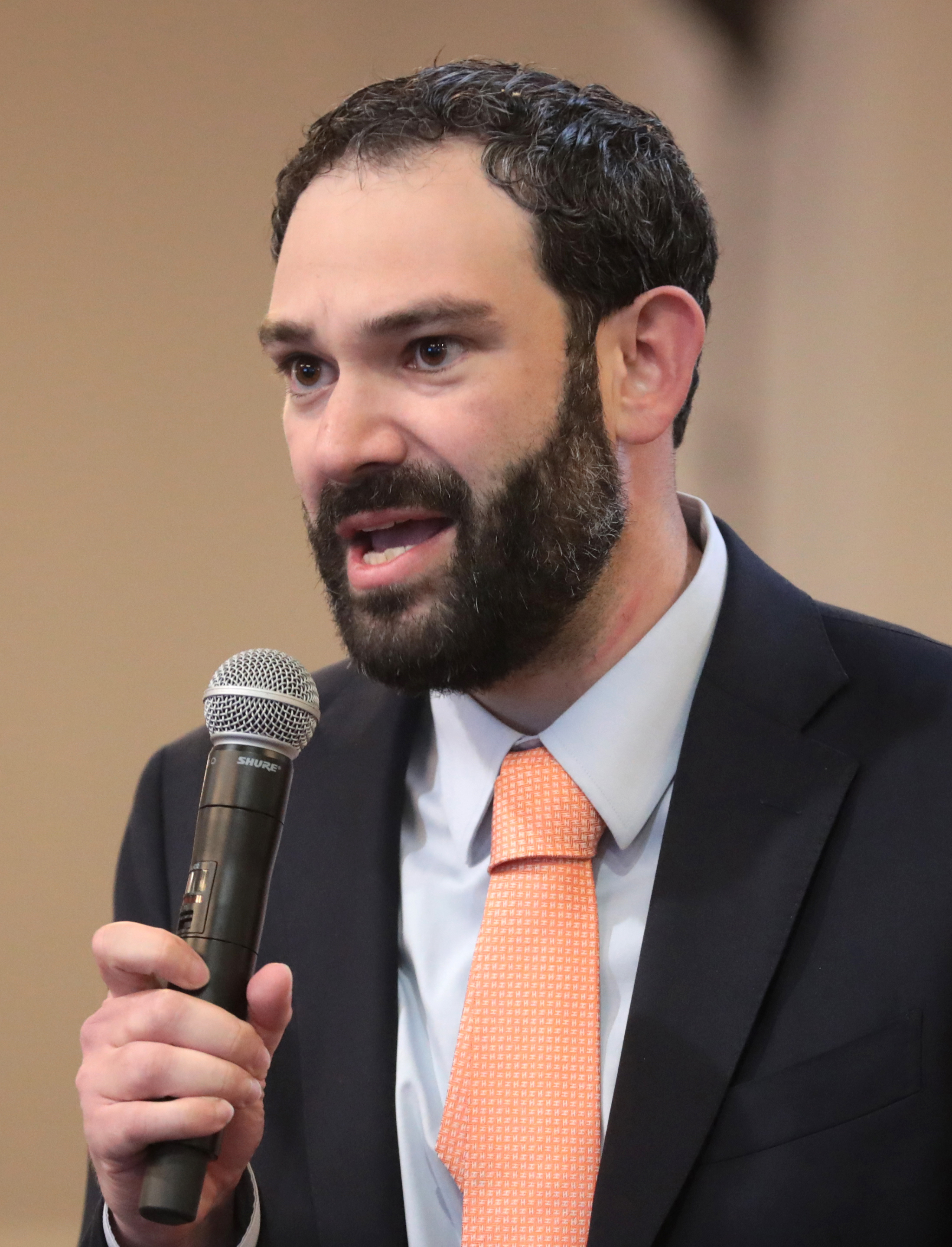
| Nominee | Adrian Fontes | Alexander Kolodin |
| Party | Democratic | Republican |
Incumbent Secretary of State
Adrian Fontes
Democratic

Secretary of State Adrian Fontes was elected in 2022 with 52.4% of the vote. He is running for re-election to a second term in office. Fontes hinted at a potential primary challenge to Arizona governor Katie Hobbs, but ultimately decided against it. Republican state representative Alexander Kolodin announced his campaign on March 31.

== Arkansas ==
Arkansas Secretary of State election

| Nominee | Kim Hammer | Kelly Grappe |
| Party | Republican | Democratic |
Incumbent Secretary of State
Cole Jester
Republican

Secretary of State John Thurston resigned after being elected as state treasurer in a 2024 special election. Governor Sarah Huckabee Sanders appointed Cole Jester to fill the remainder of his term. However, he is ineligible to run for a full term per the state constitution. Republican candidates include state senator Kim Hammer. Marketing specialist Kelly Grappe is running as a Democrat.

== California ==
California Secretary of State election
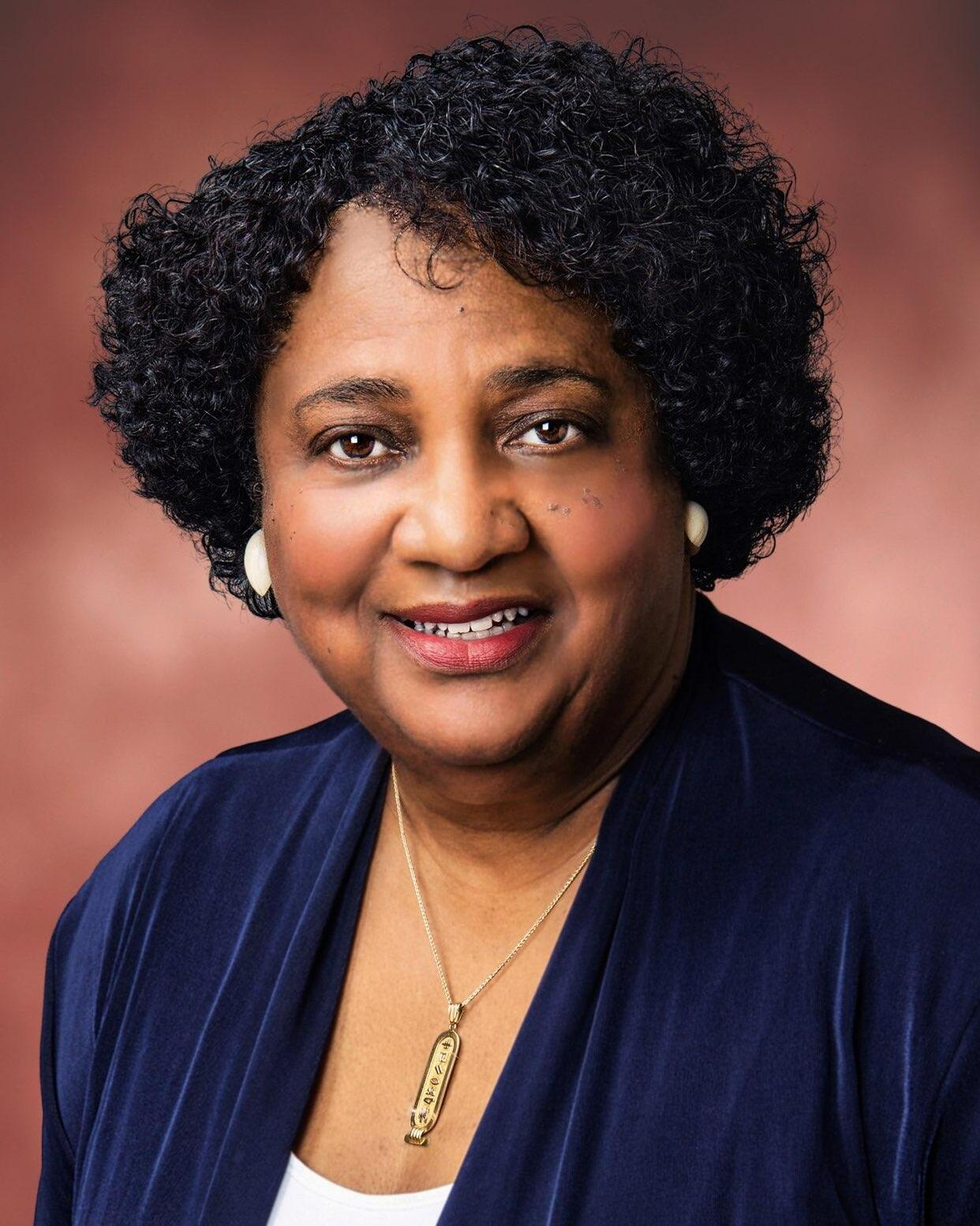

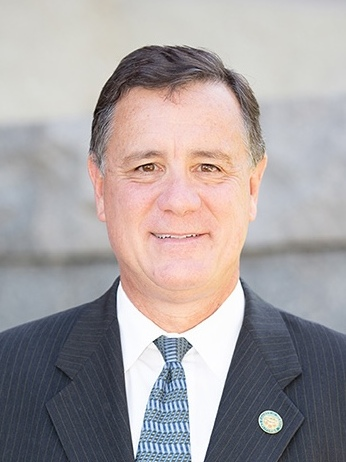
| Candidate | Shirley Weber | Donald P. Wagner |
| Party | Democratic | Republican |
Incumbent Secretary of State
Shirley Weber
Democratic

Secretary of State Shirley Weber was elected in 2022 with 60.1% of the vote. She is running for re-election to a second term. Republican Orange County supervisor Don Wagner is also running for the position.

== Colorado ==
Colorado Secretary of State election

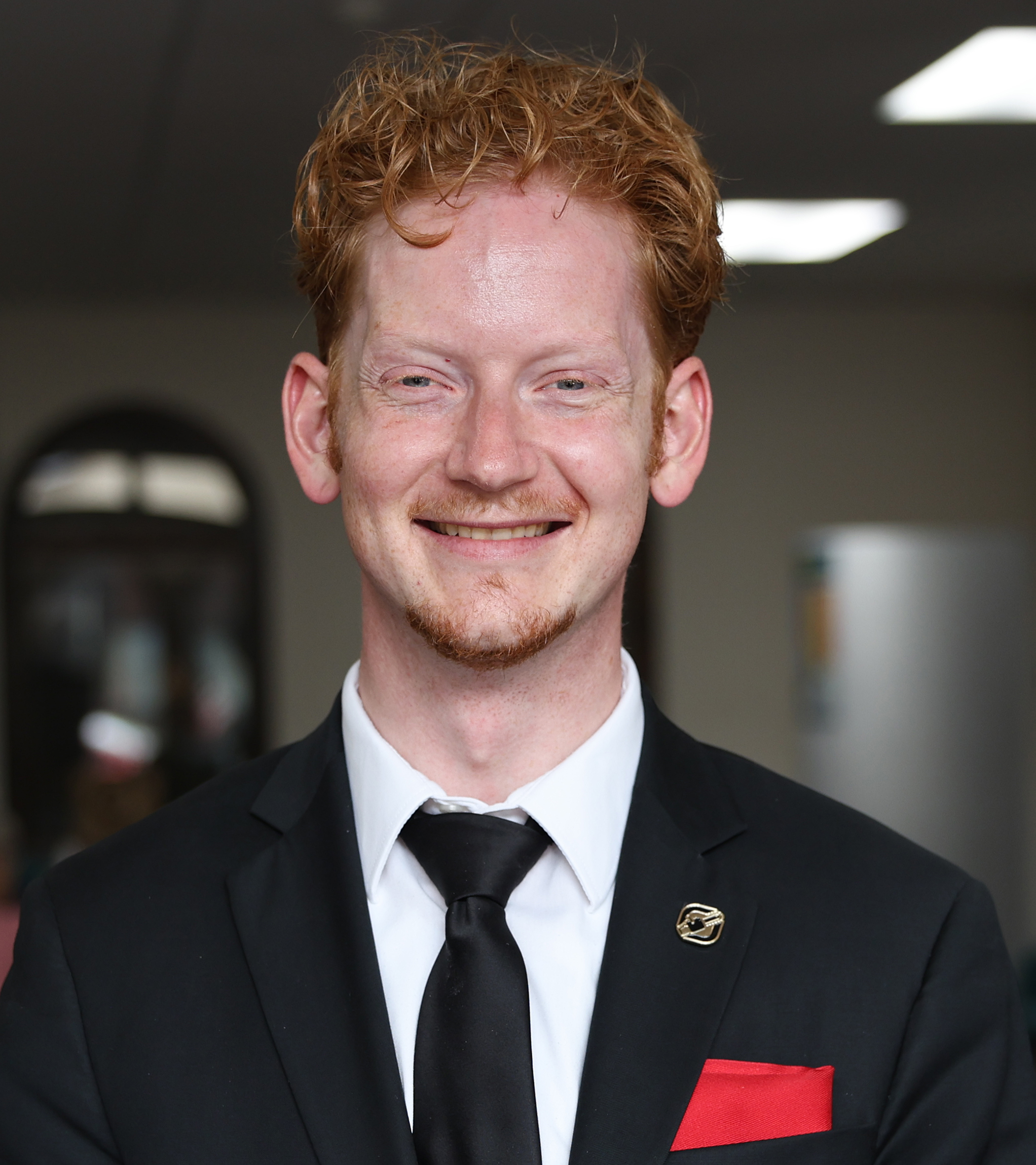
| Nominee | Amanda Gonzalez | James Wiley |
| Party | Democratic | Republican |
Incumbent Secretary of State
Jena Griswold
Democratic

Secretary of State Jena Griswold was re-elected in 2022 with 55.1% of the vote. She will be term limited by the Colorado Constitution and cannot seek re-election to a third consecutive term. Democratic candidates include Jefferson County Clerk Amanda Gonzalez.

== Connecticut ==
Connecticut Secretary of State election
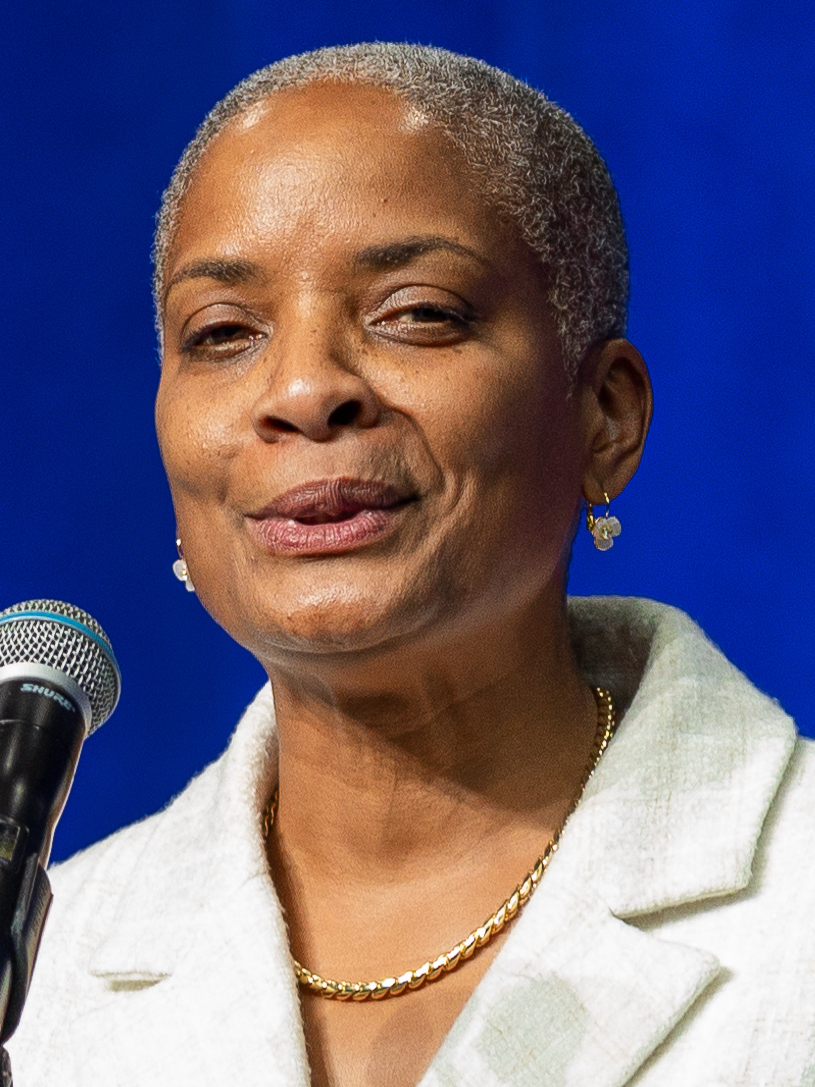

| Nominee | Stephanie Thomas | Peter Lumaj |
| Party | Democratic | Republican |
Incumbent Secretary of State
Stephanie Thomas
Democratic

Secretary of the State Stephanie Thomas was elected in 2022 with 55.2% of the vote. She is running for re-election. Republican perennial candidate Peter Lumaj has created an exploratory committee, though has not specified which office he may run for.

== Georgia ==
Georgia Secretary of State election
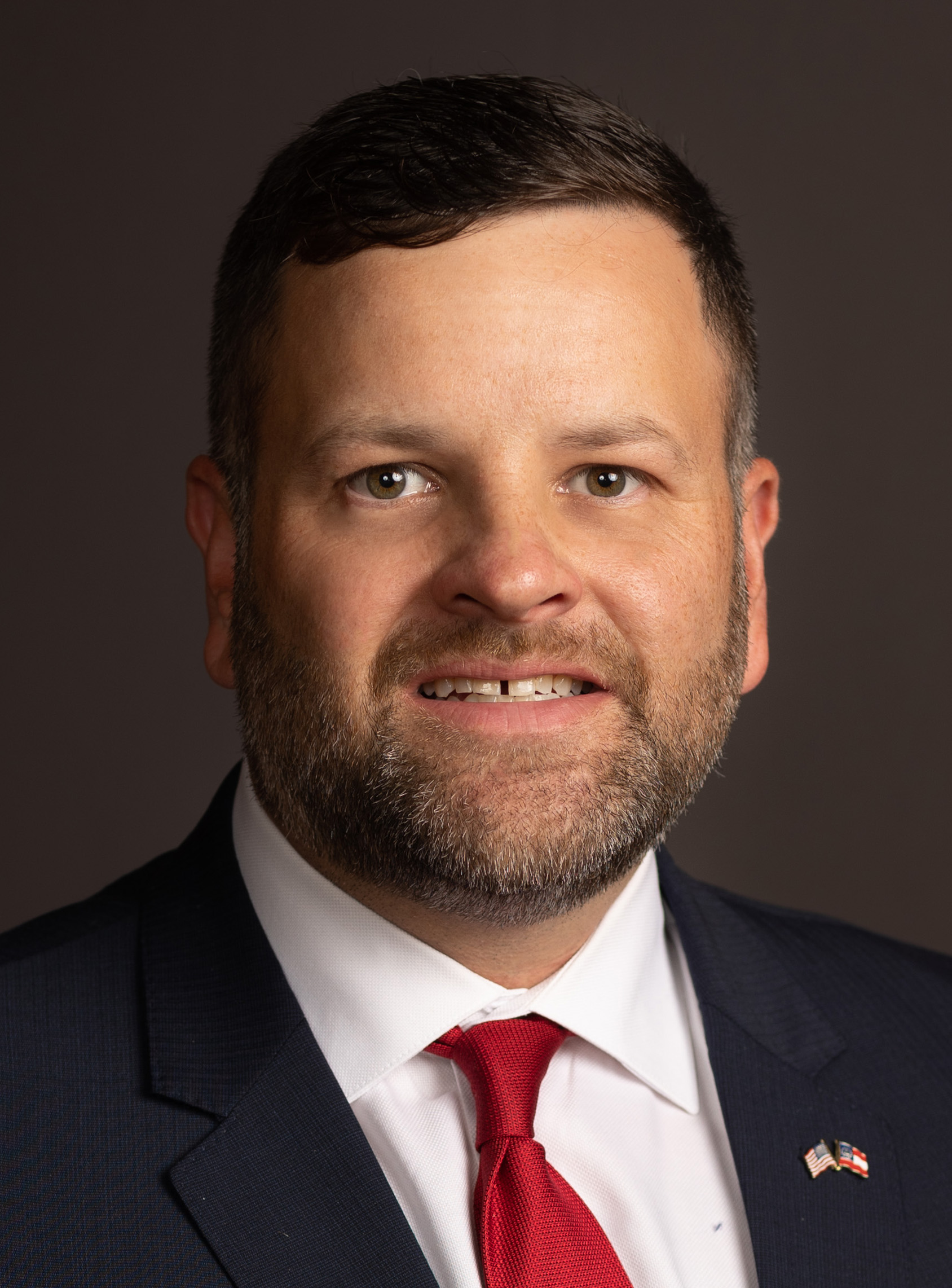

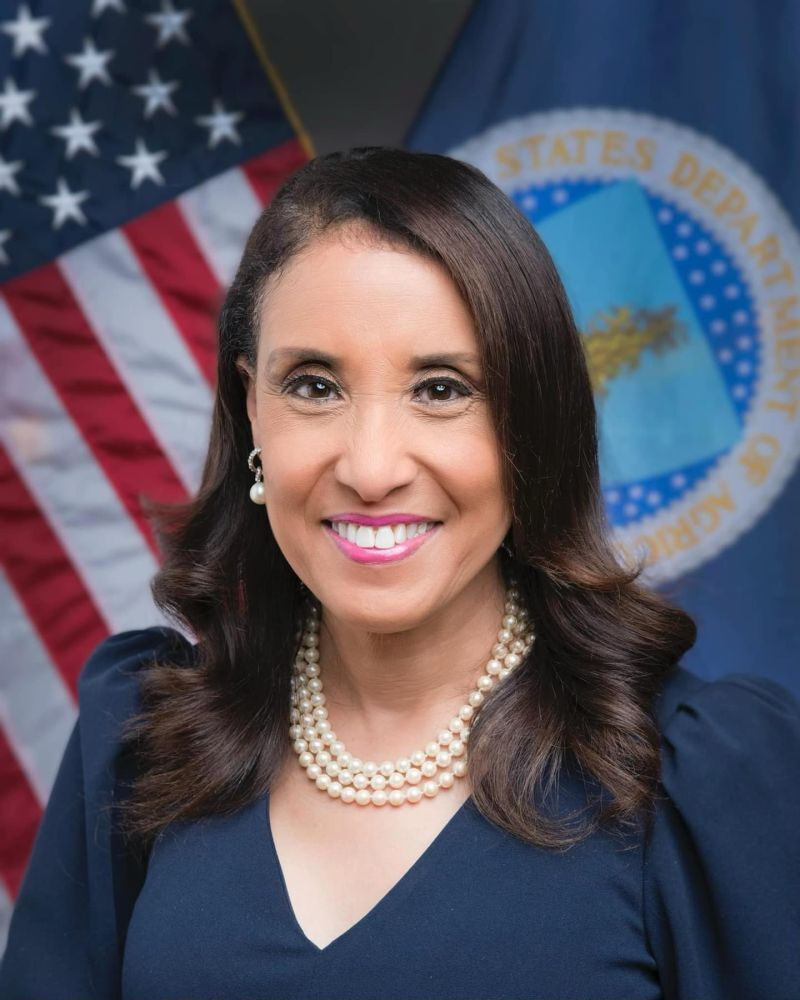
| Nominee | Tim Fleming | Penny Brown Reynolds |
| Party | Republican | Democratic |
Incumbent Secretary of State
Brad Raffensperger
Republican

Secretary of State Brad Raffensperger was re-elected in 2022 with 53.2% of the vote. In September 2025, he decided to run for governor instead of seeking reelection as Secretary of State. Republican state representative Tim Fleming, businessman Kelvin King, and former elections official Gabriel Sterling have announced plans to run for the position.

== Idaho ==
Idaho Secretary of State election

| Nominee | Phil McGrane | Shawn Keenan |
| Party | Republican | Democratic |
Incumbent Secretary of State
Phil McGrane
Republican

Secretary of State Phil McGrane was elected in 2022 with 72.5% of the vote. He is running for re-election against Democrat Shawn Keenan.

== Illinois ==
Illinois Secretary of State election
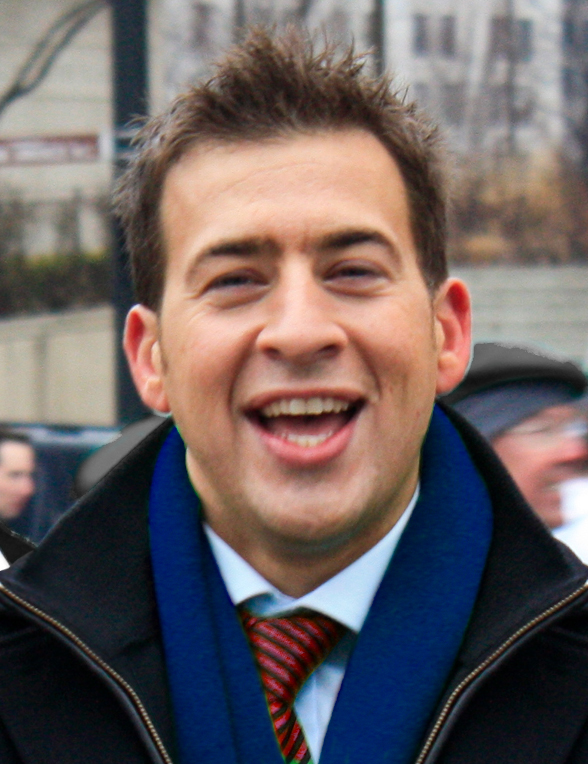

| Nominee | Alexi Giannoulias | Diane Harris |
| Party | Democratic | Republican |
Incumbent Secretary of State
Alexi Giannoulias
Democratic

Secretary of State Alexi Giannoulias was elected in 2022 with 54.3% of the vote. He is running for re-election. Republicans Walter Adamczyk and Joliet Junior College trustee Diane Harris are running against him.

== Indiana ==
Indiana Secretary of State election

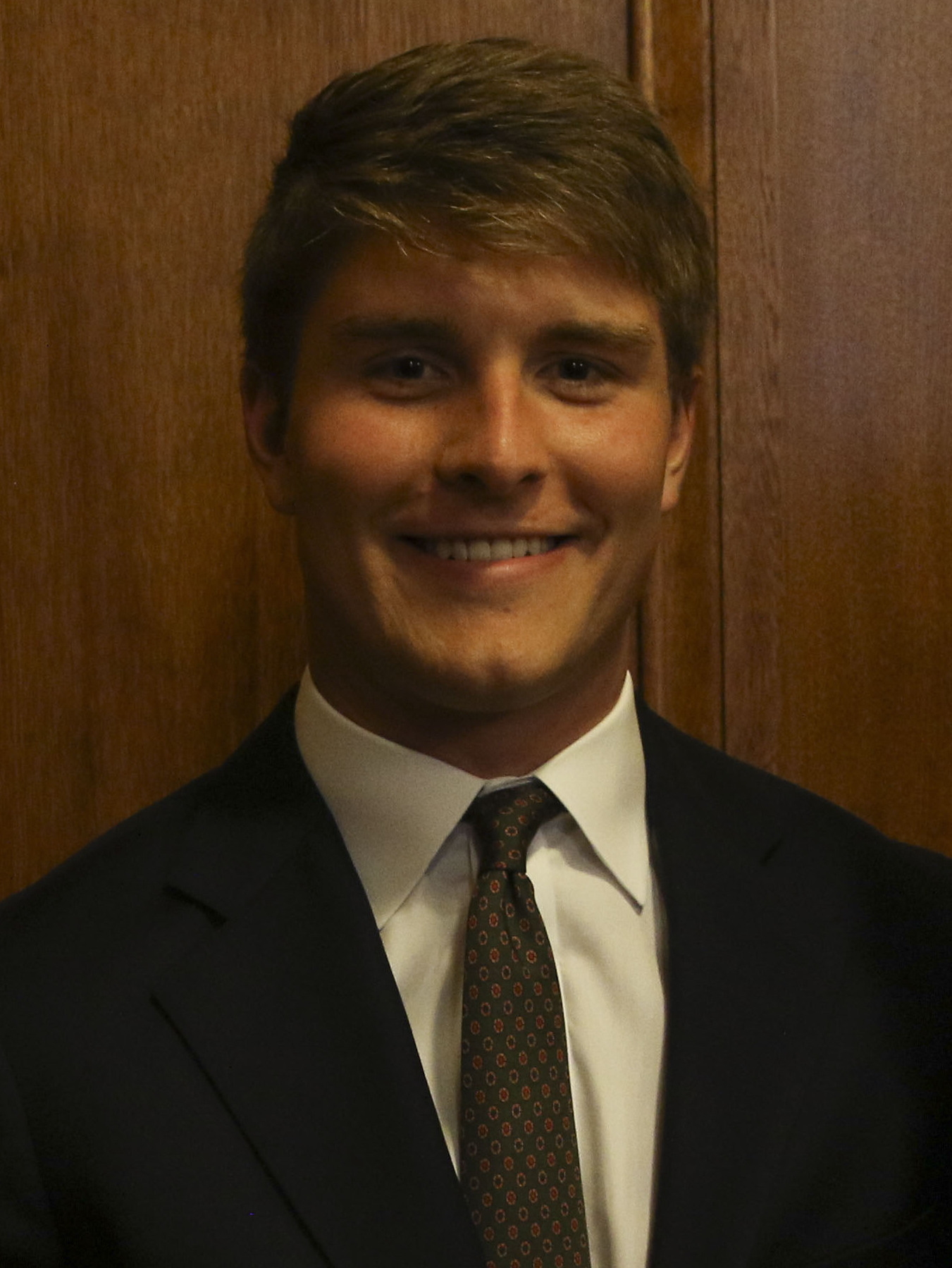

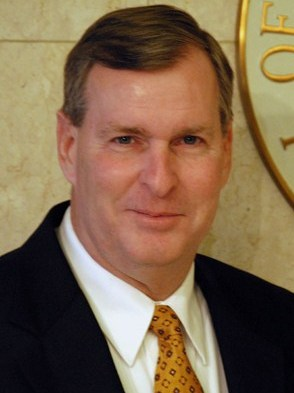
| Nominee | Max Engling | Beau Bayh | Greg Ballard |
| Party | Republican | Democratic | Independent |
Incumbent Secretary of State
Diego Morales
Republican

Secretary of State Diego Morales was elected in 2022 with 54.1% of the vote. He ran for re-election to a second term. He was defeated by Congressional Staffer Max Engling. Beau Bayh, an attorney and the son of former Indiana governor Evan Bayh, is running for the office as a Democrat. Former Indianapolis mayor Greg Ballard, formerly a Republican, announced his intention to run for the office as an Independent in March of 2026.

== Iowa ==
Iowa Secretary of State election
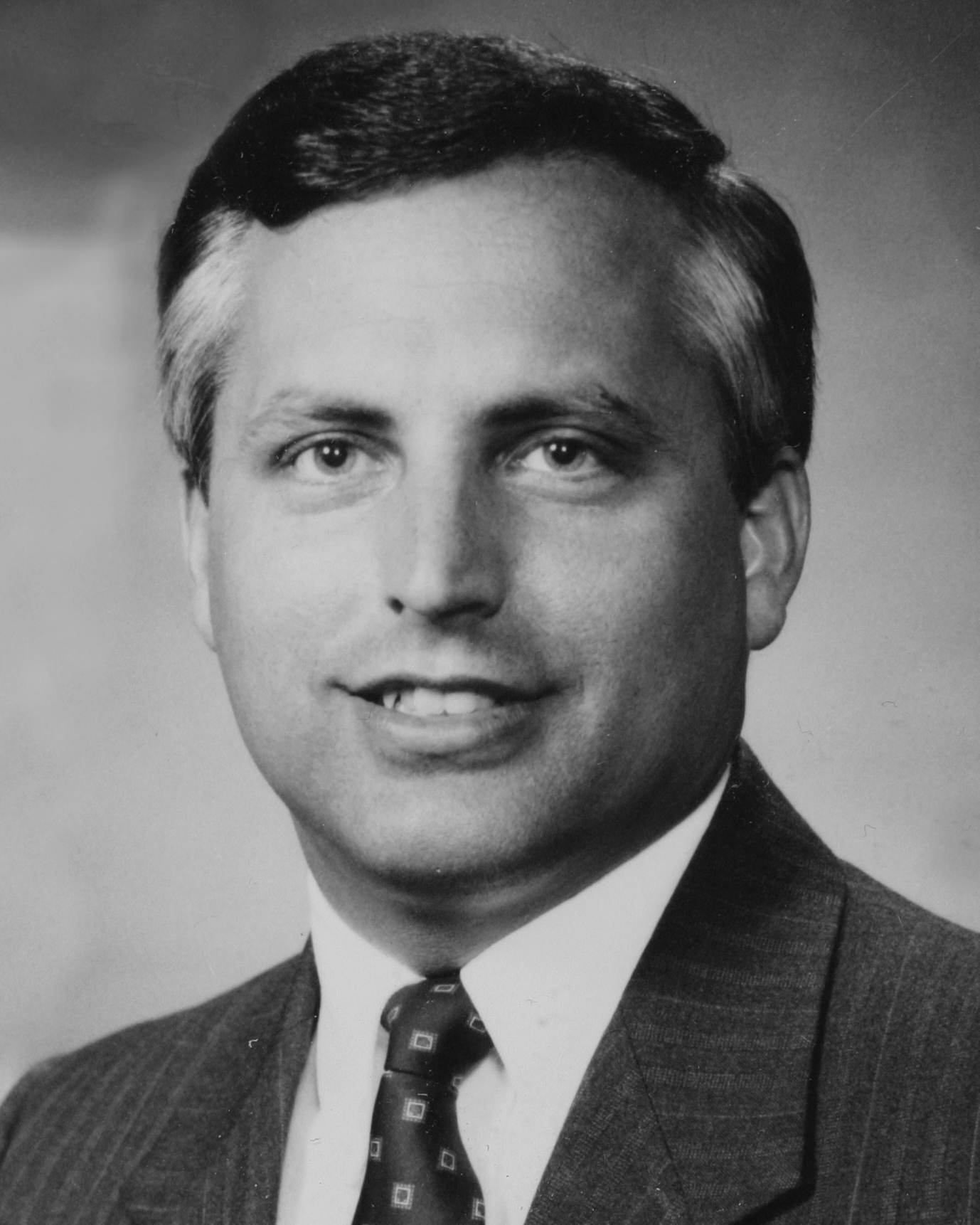

| Nominee | Paul Pate | Ryan Peterman |
| Party | Republican | Democratic |
Incumbent Secretary of State
Paul Pate
Republican

Secretary of State Paul Pate was re-elected in 2022 with 60.1% of the vote. He is running for re-election. Democratic Navy veteran Ryan Peterman is running against him.

== Kansas ==
Kansas Secretary of State election
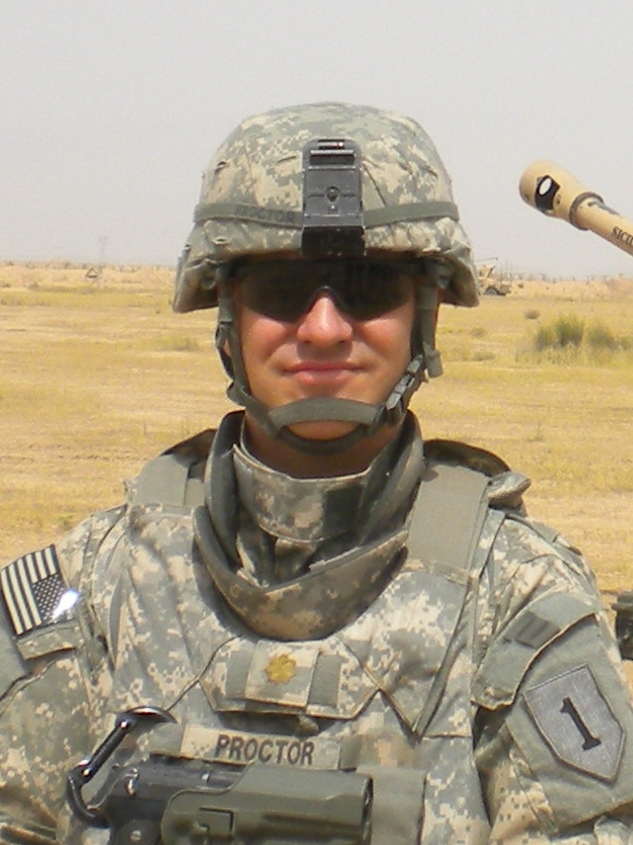

| Nominee | Pat Proctor | Jennifer Day |
| Party | Republican | Democratic |
Incumbent Secretary of State
Scott Schwab
Republican

Secretary of State Scott Schwab was re-elected in 2022 with 58.4% of the vote. He is retiring to run for governor. State representatives Pat Proctor is the presumptive Republican nominee. Former state representative Jennifer Day and construction inspector Samuel Lane are running as Democrats.

== Massachusetts ==
Massachusetts Secretary of the Commonwealth election
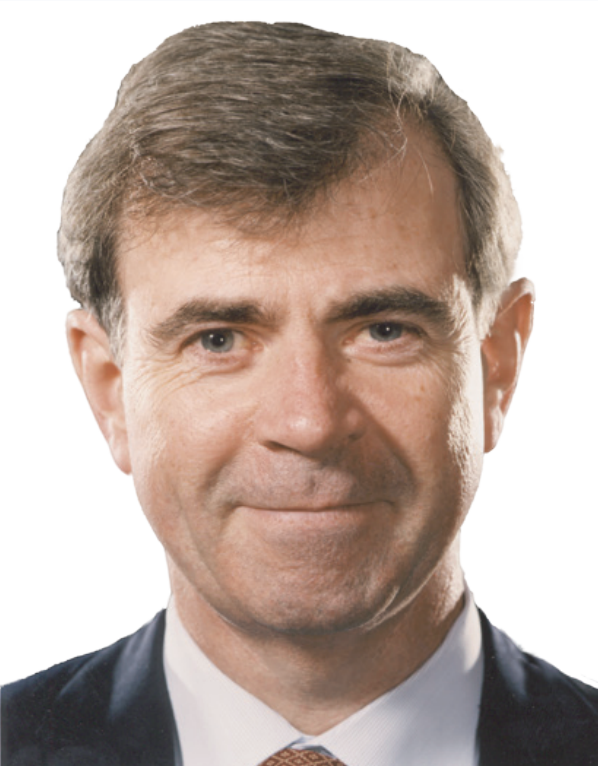

| Candidate | William F. Galvin | Anne Brensley |
| Party | Democratic | Republican |
Incumbent Secretary of the Commonwealth
William F. Galvin
Democratic

Secretary of the Commonwealth William F. Galvin was re-elected in 2022 with 67.7% of the vote. He is running for re-election to a ninth term. Republican former Wayland select boardmember Anne Brensley is challenging Galvin after an apparently successful write-in campaign, pending official certification.

== Michigan ==
Michigan Secretary of State election
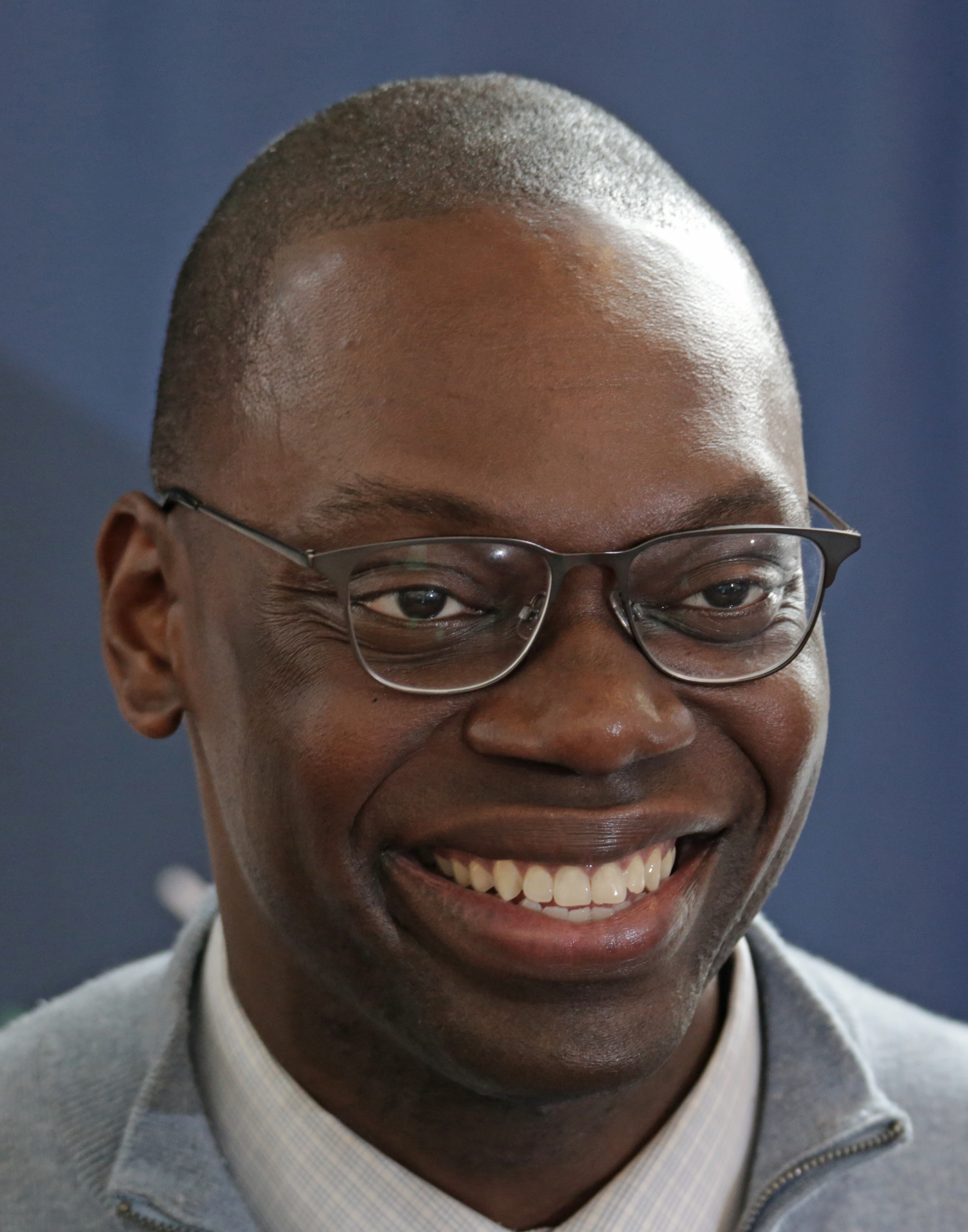

| Nominee | Garlin Gilchrist | Anthony Forlini |
| Party | Democratic | Republican |
Incumbent Secretary of State
Jocelyn Benson
Democratic

Secretary of State Jocelyn Benson was re-elected in 2022 with 55.9% of the vote. She is term-limited and cannot seek re-election.

Democratic lieutenant governor Garlin Gilchrist won the party's nomination over former lottery commissioner Suzanna Shkreli.

Macomb County clerk Anthony Forlini won the Republican nomination, beating Clarkston Community Schools trustee Amanda Love and businesswoman Monica Yatooma.

== Minnesota ==
Minnesota Secretary of State election
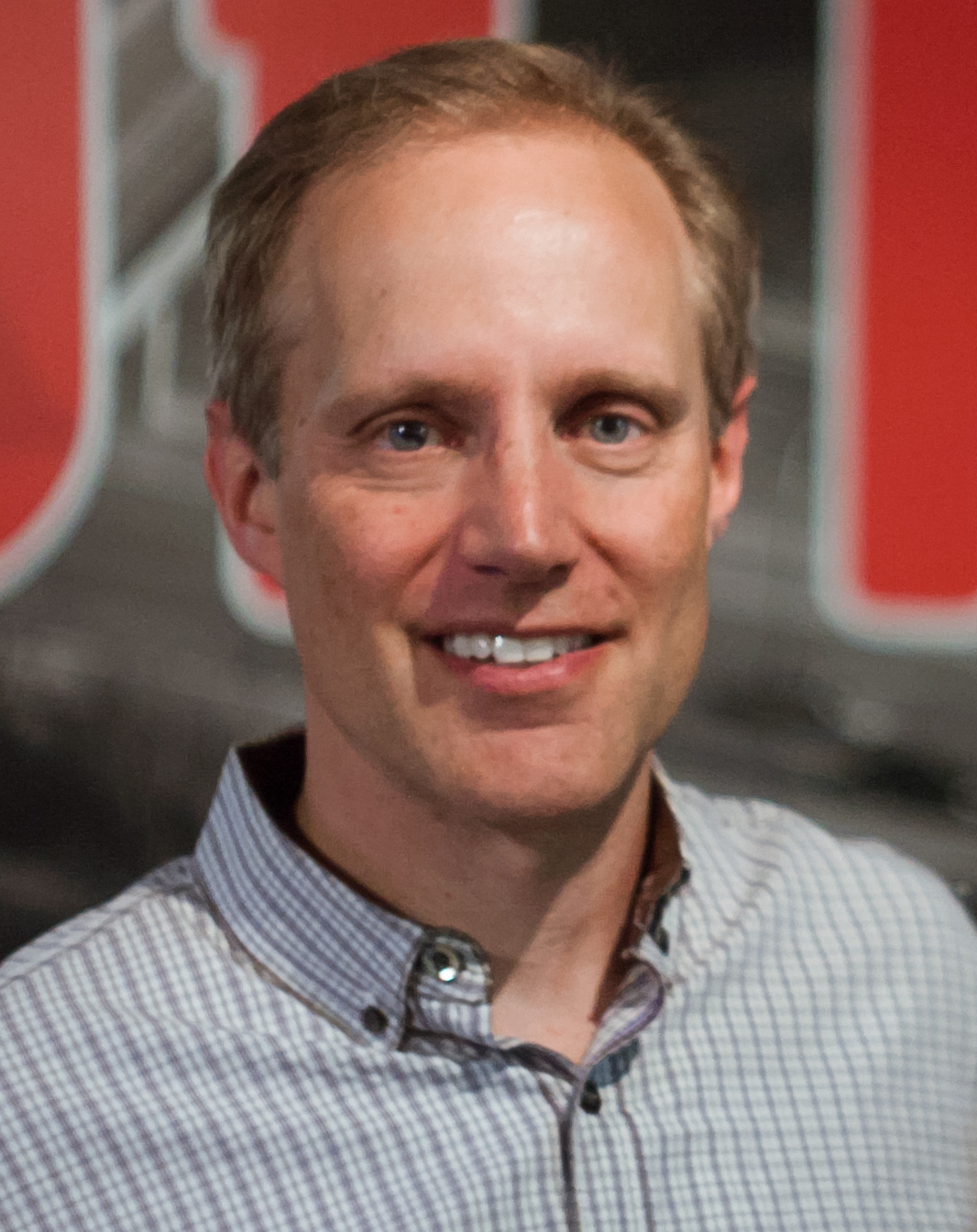

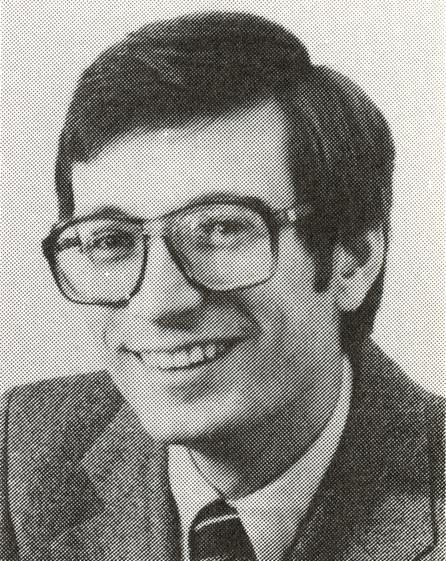
| Nominee | Steve Simon | Tad Jude |
| Party | Democratic (DFL) | Republican |
Incumbent Secretary of State
Steve Simon
Democratic

Secretary of State Steve Simon was re-elected in 2022 with 54.5% of the vote. He is running for re-election to a fourth term.

Republican Tad Jude is the Republican nominee.

== Nebraska ==
Nebraska Secretary of State election

| Nominee | Scott Petersen | Sarah Slattery |
| Party | Republican | Democratic |
Incumbent Secretary of State
Bob Evnen
Republican

Secretary of State Bob Evnen was re-elected unopposed in 2022. He is running for re-election to a third term.

== Nevada ==
Nevada Secretary of State election
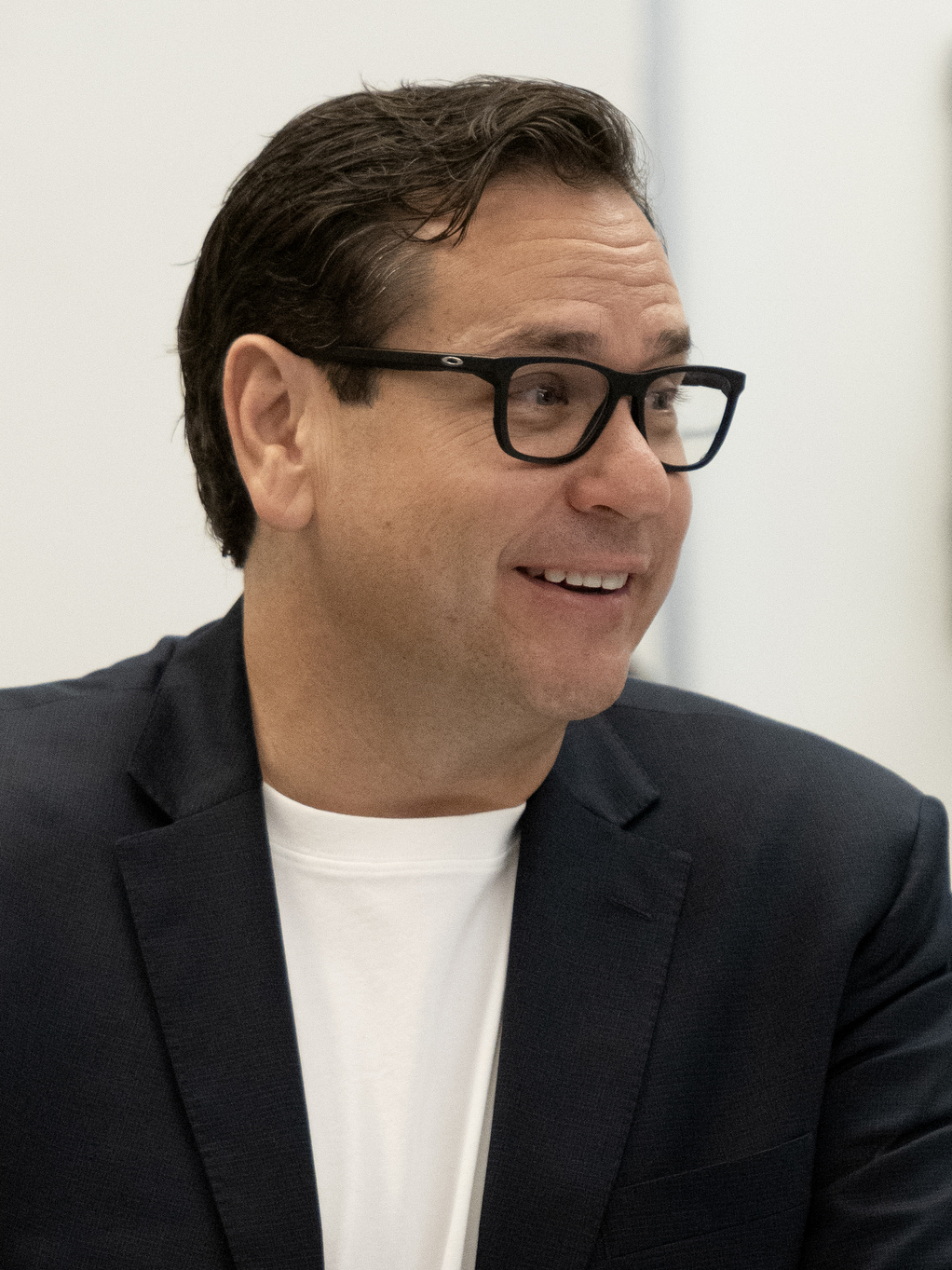

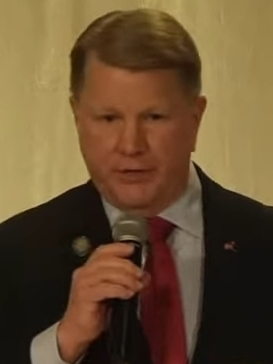
| Nominee | Cisco Aguilar | Jim Marchant |
| Party | Democratic | Republican |
Incumbent Secretary of State
Cisco Aguilar
Democratic

Secretary of State Cisco Aguilar was elected in 2022 with 48.9% of the vote. He is running for re-election.

Republican Sharron Angle has announced her candidacy.

== New Mexico ==
New Mexico Secretary of State election

| Nominee | Amanda López Askin | Ramona Goolsby |
| Party | Democratic | Republican |
Incumbent Secretary of State
Maggie Toulouse Oliver
Democratic

Secretary of State Maggie Toulouse Oliver was re-elected in 2022 with 54.5% of the vote. She is term-limited and cannot seek re-election. On June 2, Doña Ana County Clerk Amanda López Askin won the Democratic primary with 53% of the vote.

== North Dakota ==
North Dakota Secretary of State election
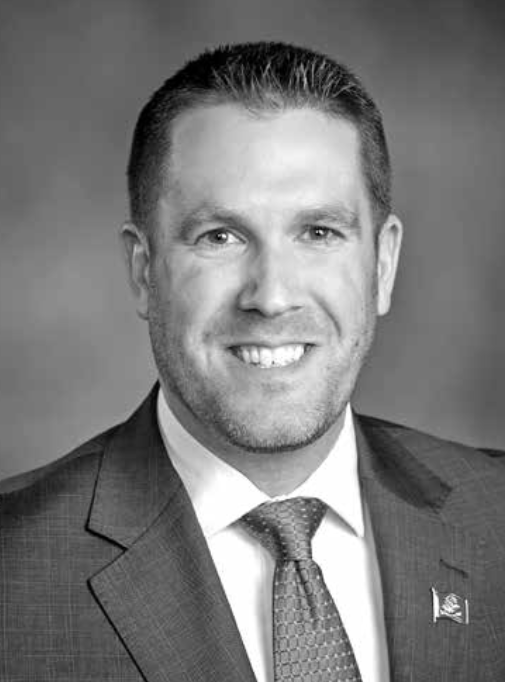

| Nominee | Michael Howe | Ryan Braunberger |
| Party | Republican | Democratic–NPL |
Incumbent Secretary of State
Michael Howe
Republican

Secretary of State Michael Howe was re-elected in 2022 with 63.3% of the vote. He is running for re-election.

== Ohio ==
Ohio Secretary of State election
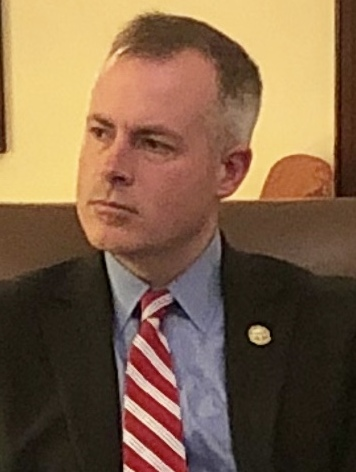

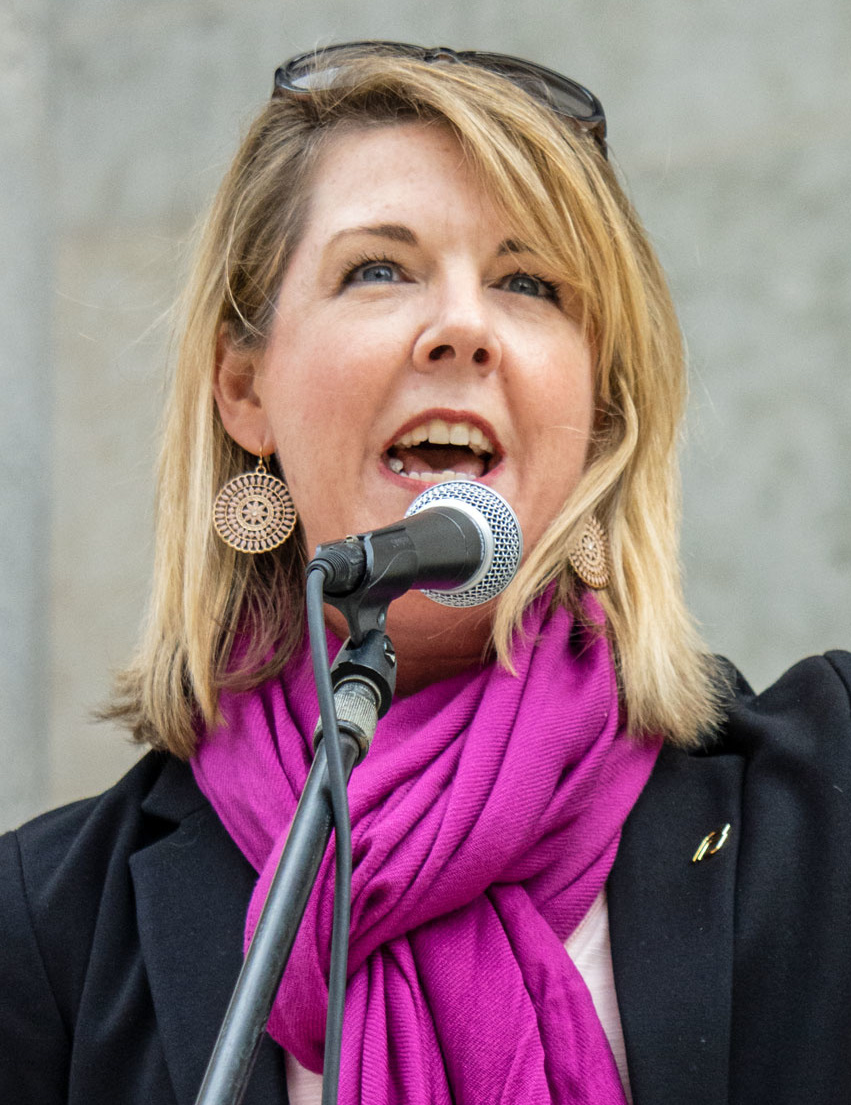
| Nominee | Robert Sprague | Allison Russo |
| Party | Republican | Democratic |
Incumbent Secretary of State
Frank LaRose
Republican

Secretary of State Frank LaRose was re-elected in 2022 with 59.3% of the vote. He is term-limited and cannot seek re-election. Ohio State Treasurer Robert Sprague has launched a bid for the Republican nomination, as has former Air Force officer Marcell Strbich. On the Democratic side, oncologist Bryan Hambley and former House minority leader Allison Russo have announced runs.

== Rhode Island ==
Rhode Island Secretary of State election
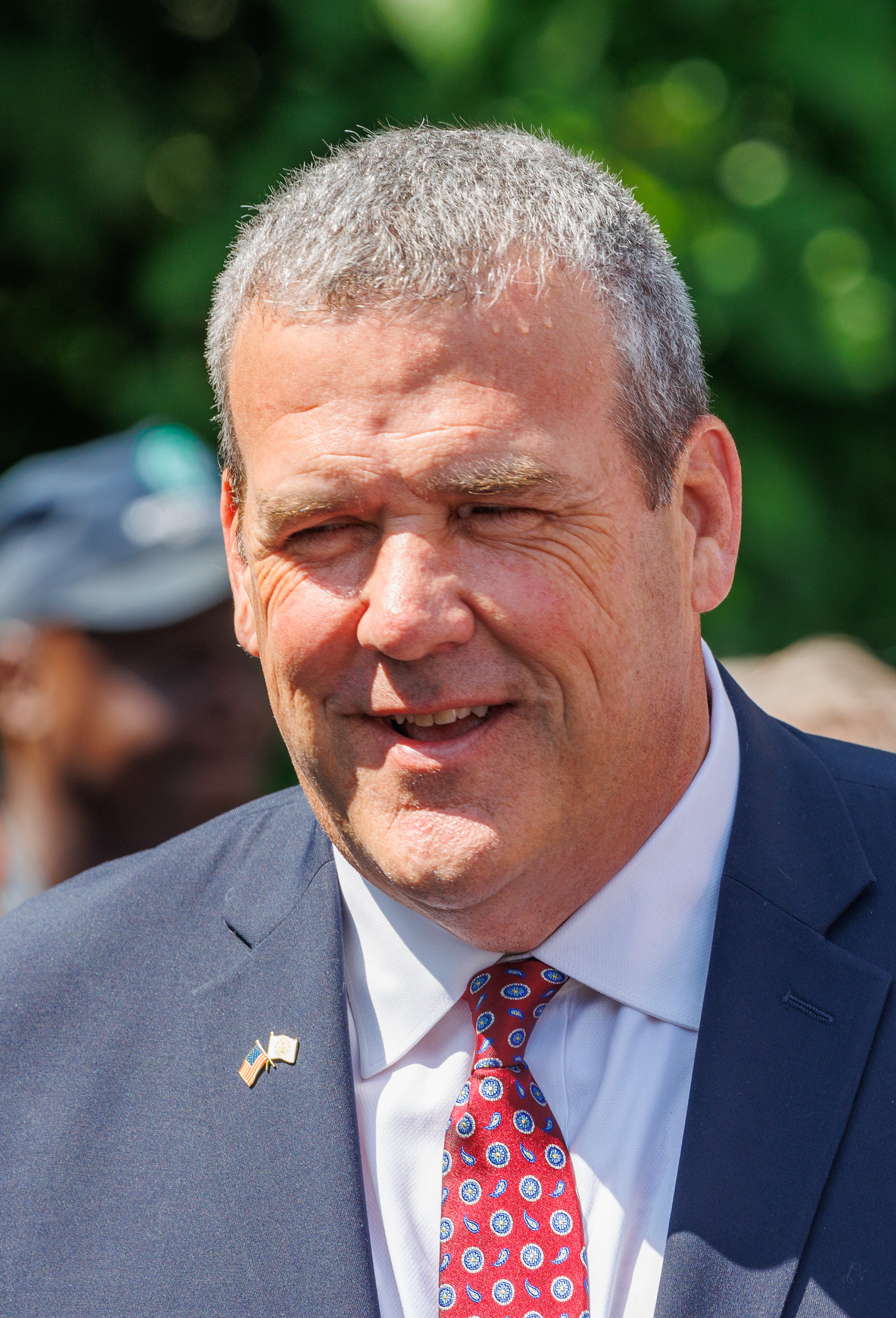
| Nominee | Gregg Amore |
| Party | Democratic |
Secretary of State before election
Gregg Amore
Democratic
Elected Secretary of State
Gregg Amore
Democratic

Secretary of State Gregg Amore was re-elected in 2022 with 59.5% of the vote. He was re-elected unopposed.

== South Carolina ==
South Carolina Secretary of State election
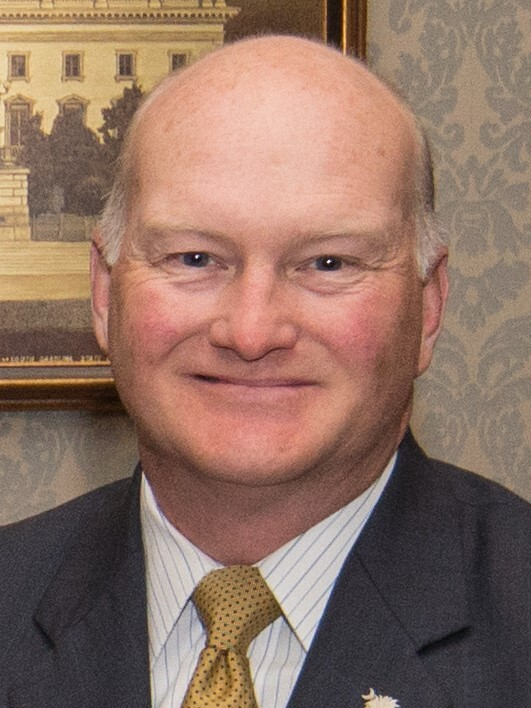

| Nominee | Mark Hammond | Jason Belton |
| Party | Republican | Democratic |
Incumbent Secretary of State
Mark Hammond
Republican

Secretary of State Mark Hammond was re-elected in 2022 with 63.3% of the vote. He is running for re-election.

== South Dakota ==
South Dakota Secretary of State election
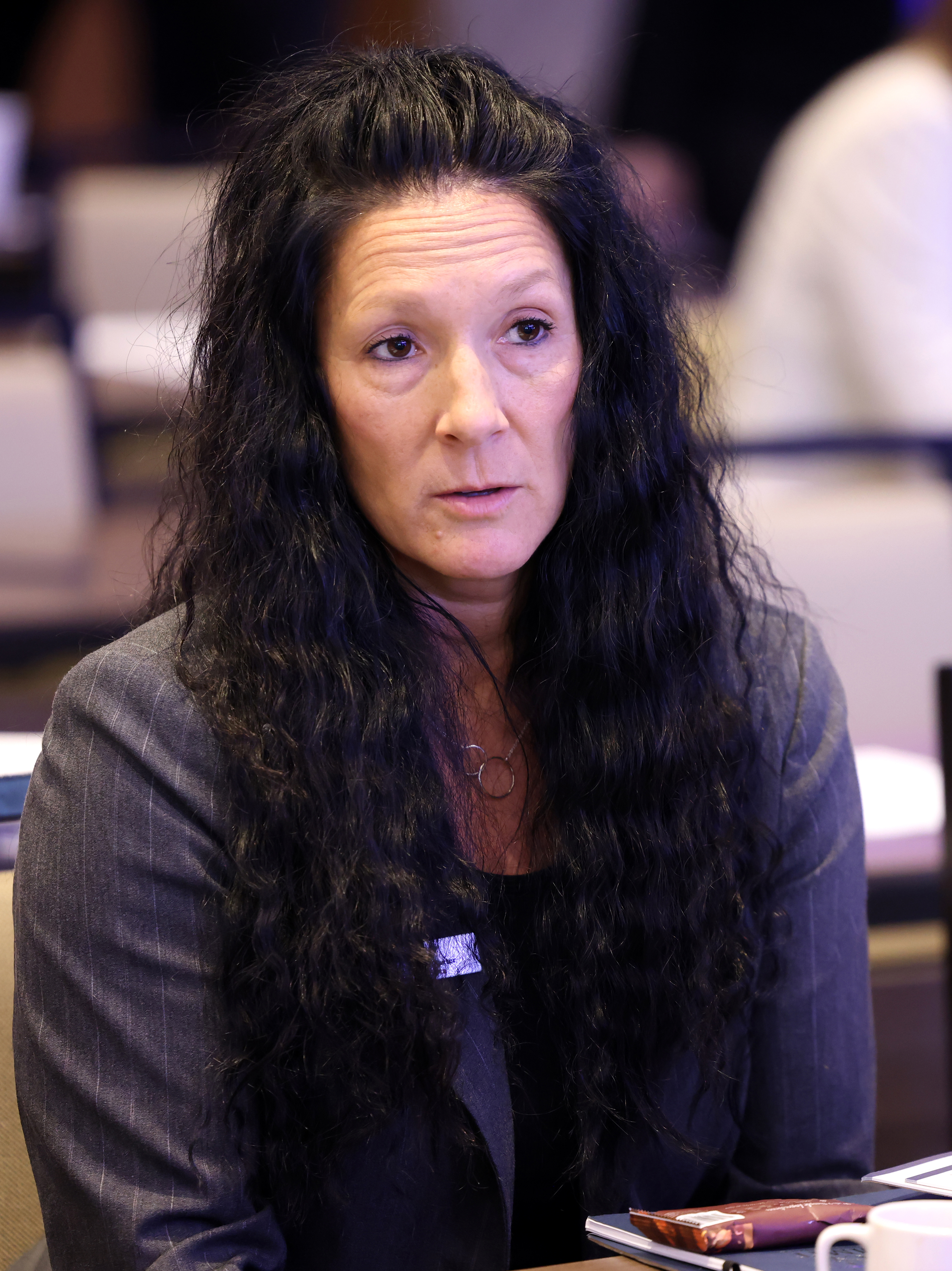

| Nominee | Heather Baxter | Terrence Davis |
| Party | Republican | Democratic |
- Baxter: 40–50% 50–60% 60–70% 70–80% 80–90% Davis: 50–60% 60–70% 70–80% 80–90%
Incumbent Secretary of State
Monae Johnson
Republican

Secretary of State Monae Johnson was elected in 2022 with 63.9% of the vote. She was eligible to run for re-election but was defeated by state representative Heather Baxter in the convention. Democratic former state trooper Terrence Davis is running against her.

== Vermont ==
Vermont Secretary of State election
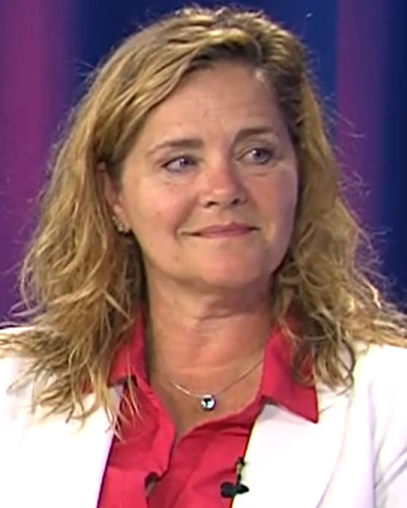

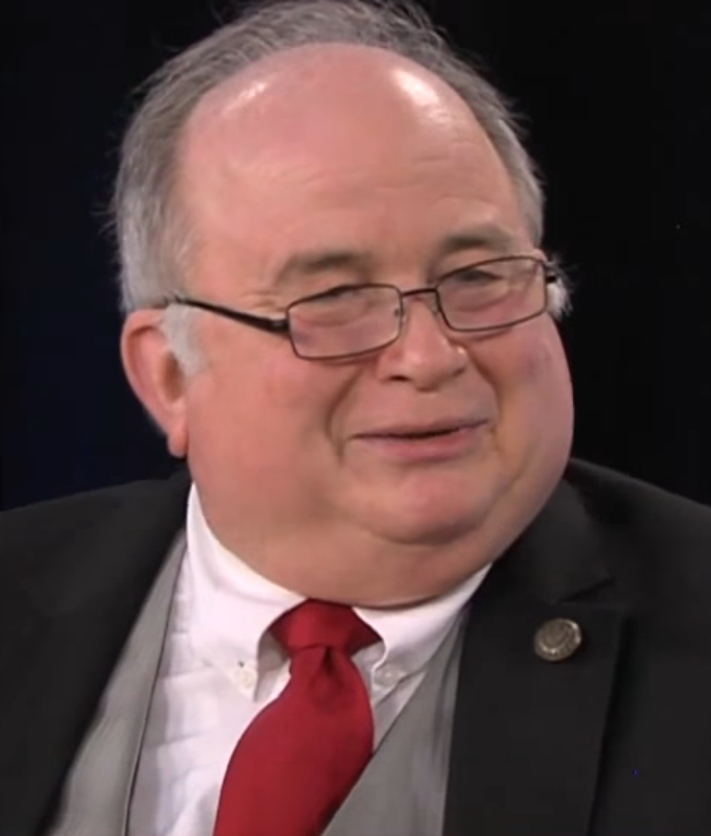
| Nominee | Sarah Copeland Hanzas | H. Brooke Paige |
| Party | Democratic | Republican |
Incumbent Secretary of State
Sarah Copeland Hanzas
Democratic

Secretary of State Sarah Copeland Hanzas was re-elected in 2024 with 59.6% of the vote. She is running for re-election. She is being challenged by Republican Brooke Paige, while also running for Secretary of State at the same time.

== Wisconsin ==
Wisconsin Secretary of State election
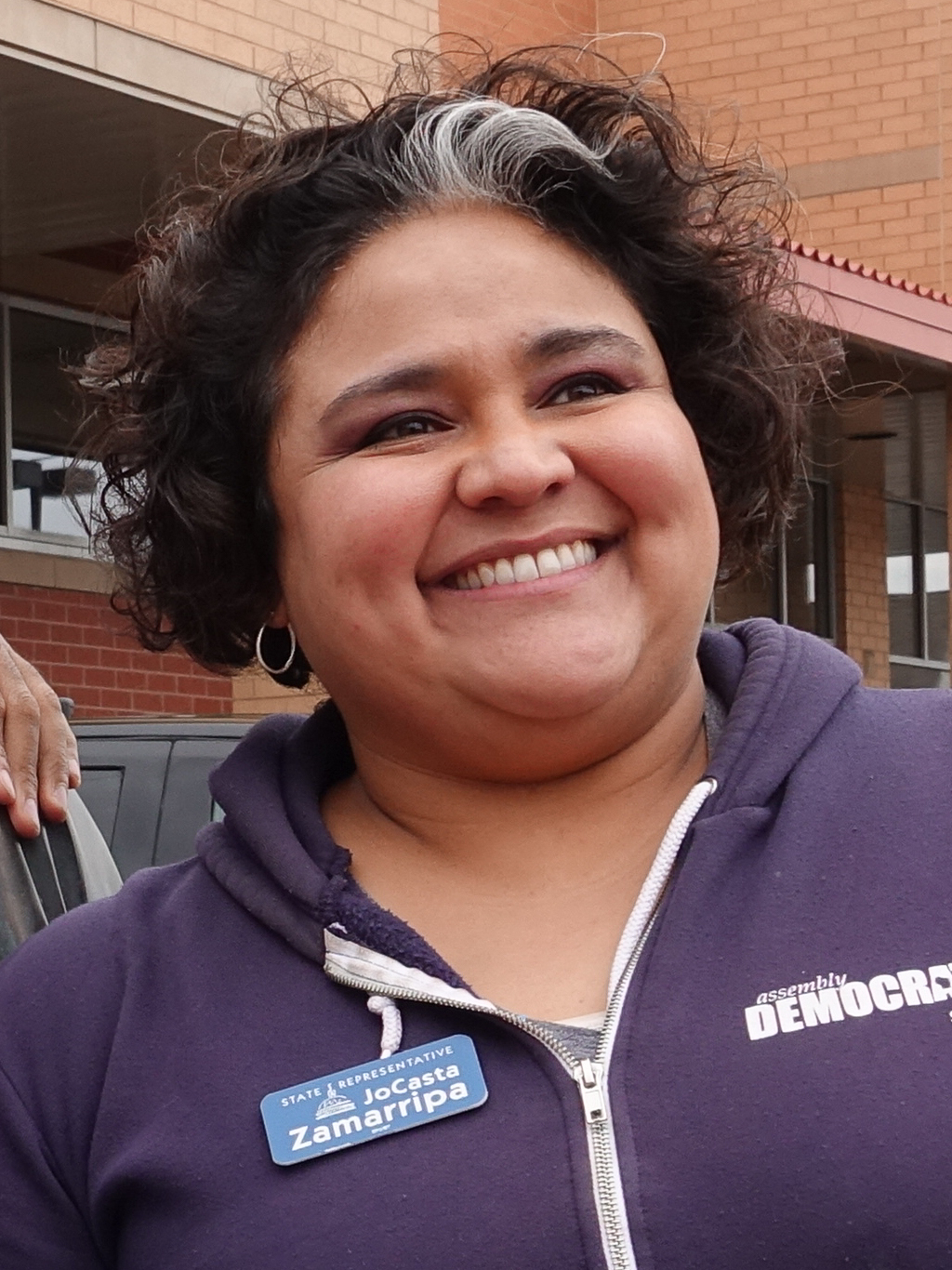

| Nominee | JoCasta Zamarripa | Jay Schroeder |
| Party | Democratic | Republican |
Incumbent Secretary of State
Sarah Godlewski
Democratic

Secretary of State Sarah Godlewski was appointed in 2023 after Doug La Follette resigned. She is retiring to run for lieutenant governor. On August 2, Milwaukee alderperson JoCasta Zamarripa won the Democratic primary unopposed.

Activist Jay Schroeder won the Republican primary. Schroeder was the party's nominee in 2018 for the office, losing to longtime incumbent Doug La Follette.

== Wyoming ==
Wyoming Secretary of State election

| Nominee | Robert Short | Bryan McCarty |
| Party | Republican | Democratic |
Incumbent Secretary of State
Chuck Gray
Republican

Secretary of State Chuck Gray was elected in 2022 with 91.6% of the vote, without major party opposition. He is retiring to run for U.S. House. Robert Short is the Republican nominee to replace Gray.
