= 2026 Arkansas Secretary of State election =

- November 3, 2026
Candidate	Kim Hammer	Kelly Grappe
Party	Republican	Democratic
Popular vote	490,605	347,639
Percentage	55.9%	39.6%
- Hammer: 50–60% 60–70% 70–80% 80–90% Grappe: 50–60% 60–70%
Secretary of State before election
Cole Jester
Republican
Elected Secretary of State
Kim Hammer
Republican

The 2026 Arkansas Secretary of State election was held on November 3, 2026, to elect the secretary of state of Arkansas. Primary elections were held on March 3, and a primary runoff election was held on March 31. Incumbent secretary of state Cole Jester was appointed in 2024 and was ineligible to run for a full term.

== Republican primary ==
The Republican primary went to a runoff, which became characterized as Hammer representing the GOP establishment and Norris as a political outsider. With little daylight on the issues between the two conservative Republicans, Hammer touted his 16 years of legislative experience and endorsements by incumbent Arkansas officeholders, and Norris portrayed himself as an outsider being attacked by the establishment. During the runoff, Norris' history of profane and conspiratorial social media posts became a campaign issue featured in commercials and websites, including one by a Sarah Huckabee Sanders-linked expenditure committee. The scandal also caused incumbent Jester to call for Norris to drop out of the race.

=== Candidates ===
==== Nominee ====
- Kim Hammer, state senator from the 16th district (2019–present)

==== Eliminated in runoff ====
- Bryan Norris, veteran

==== Eliminated in primary ====
- Cathy Hardin Harrison, Miller County judge

=== Endorsements ===
Kim Hammer

U.S. senators

- Tom Cotton, Arkansas (2015–present)

Statewide officials

- Tim Griffin, attorney general of Arkansas (2023–present)
- Sarah Huckabee Sanders, governor of Arkansas (2023–present) and former White House press secretary (2017–2019)
- Cole Jester, secretary of state of Arkansas (2024–present)
- Leslie Rutledge, lieutenant governor of Arkansas (2023–present)
Bryan Norris

Executive branch officials

- Michael Flynn, former national security advisor (2017)

Individuals

- Mike Lindell, CEO of MyPillow and 2026 Minnesota gubernatorial candidate

=== Results ===
Primary results by county Norris: 30–40%; 40–50%; Hammer: 30–40%; 40–50%; 50–60%; Harrison: 30–40%; 40–50%; 50–60%; Tie: 30–40%

Republican primary results
Party	Candidate	Votes	%
Republican	Bryan Norris	91,933	34.3
Republican	Kim Hammer	90,003	33.6
Republican	Cathy Hardin Harrison	85,854	32.1
Total votes		267,790	100.0

=== Runoff ===
==== Results ====
Primary runoff results by county Hammer: 50–60%; 60–70%; Norris: 50–60%; 60–70%; 70–80%

Congressional district results Hammer: 50–60%; Norris: 50–60%

Republican primary runoff results
Party	Candidate	Votes	%
Republican	Kim Hammer	40,945	50.6
Republican	Bryan Norris	40,032	49.4
Total votes		80,977	100.0

== Democratic primary ==
=== Candidates ===
==== Nominee ====
- Kelly Grappe, marketing specialist

== Third-party candidates ==
=== Libertarian Party ===
==== Nominee ====
- Michael Pakko, chair of the Libertarian Party of Arkansas and nominee for state treasurer in 2024

== General election ==
=== Predictions ===
Source	Ranking	As of
Sabato's Crystal Ball	Safe R	August 7, 2025

=== Results ===
2026 Arkansas Secretary of State election
Party	Candidate	Votes	%	±%
Republican	Kim Hammer	490,605	55.85	–11.2
Democratic	Kelly Grappe	347,639	39.58	+6.63
Libertarian	Michael Pakko	40,174	4.57	N/A
Total votes		878,418	100.00	
Republican hold				
