= 2026 North Dakota Secretary of State election =

- November 3, 2026
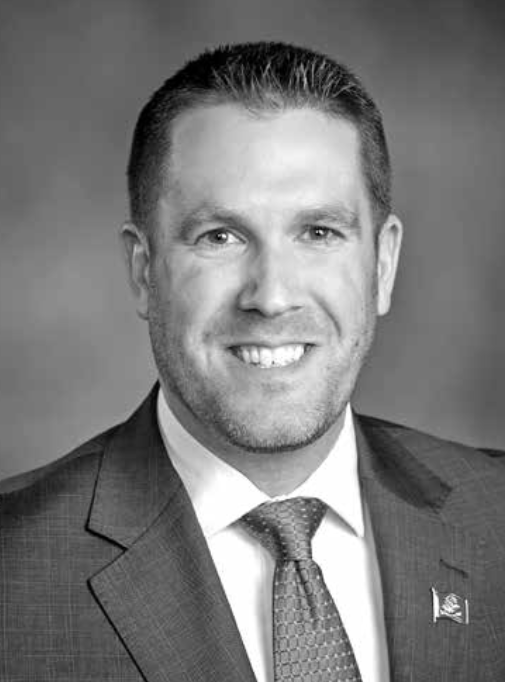

Nominee	Michael Howe	Ryan Braunberger
Party	Republican	Democratic–NPL
Popular vote	144,033	87,963
Percentage	62.08%	37.92%
- Howe: 50–60% 60–70% 70–80% 80–90% Braunberger: 50–60% 70–80%
Secretary of State before election
Michael Howe
Republican
Elected Secretary of State
Michael Howe
Republican

An election was held in the U.S. State of North Dakota on November 3, 2026, to elect the North Dakota Secretary of State to a four-year term. A partisan primary election was held on June 9, 2026.

Incumbent Republican secretary of State Michael Howe ran for re-election. In the Republican Primary, Howe faced only write-in opposition and won the primary. Howe faced Democratic–NPL nominee and state senator Ryan Braunberger in the general election. Howe was first elected in 2022 with 63.21 percent of the vote. North Dakota leans heavily Republican, with Republican presidential nominee Donald Trump winning the state with 66.96 percent of the vote in 2024. Howe won the general election with 62.08% of the vote.

This election took place alongside races for U.S. House, state house, state senate, and numerous other state and local offices.

== Republican primary ==
=== Presumptive nominee ===
- Michael Howe, incumbent secretary of state

=== Endorsements ===
Declined to endorse

Political parties

- North Dakota Republican Party

=== Results ===
Republican primary results
Party	Candidate	Votes	%
Republican	Michael Howe (incumbent)	74,102	99.6
Write-in		329	0.4
Total votes		74,431	100.0

== Democratic–NPL primary ==
=== Presumptive nominee ===
- Ryan Braunberger, state senator from the 10th district (2022–present)

=== Endorsements ===
Ryan Braunberger

Political parties

- North Dakota Democratic–Nonpartisan League Party

=== Results ===
Democratic–NPL primary results
Party	Candidate	Votes	%
Democratic–NPL	Ryan Braunberger	34,180	99.8
Write-in		62	0.2
Total votes		34,242	100.0

== General election ==
=== Predictions ===
Source	Ranking	As of
Sabato's Crystal Ball	Safe R	April 11, 2026
