= 2026 Wyoming Secretary of State election =

- November 3, 2026
- Reporting: 96.6% as of 11:54 PM MST
Nominee	Robert Short	Bryan McCarty	Tamara Trujillo
Party	Republican	Democratic	Constitution
Popular vote	124,924	43,872	15,504
Percentage	67.8%	23.8%	8.4%
- County results Short: 50–60% 60–70% 70–80% 80–90% Cameron: 50–60%
Secretary of State before election
Chuck Gray
Republican
Elected Secretary of State
Robert Short
Republican

The 2026 Wyoming Secretary of State election was held on November 3, 2026, to elect the secretary of state of Wyoming. Primary elections took place on August 18, 2026. Incumbent Republican secretary of state Chuck Gray was eligible to run for a second consecutive term, but instead chose to run for U.S. House.

== Republican primary ==
=== Candidates ===
==== Nominee ====
- Robert Short, Converse County commissioner

==== Eliminated in primary ====
- Qwenton Eagle Oviatt, entrepreneur
- Rachel Rodriguez-Williams, state representative from the 50th district (2021–present)
- Charles Young, small business owner

==== Declined ====
- Chuck Gray, incumbent secretary of state (running for U.S. House)

=== Debates ===
2026 Wyoming Secretary of State election Republican primary debates
No.	Date	Host	Moderator	Link	Republican	Republican	Republican	Republican
Key: P Participant A Absent N Not invited I Invited W Withdrawn								
Key: P Participant A Absent N Not invited I Invited W Withdrawn					Qwenton Oviatt	Rachel Rodriguez-Williams	Robert Short	Charles Young
1	Jul. 8, 2026	Weston County Republican Party; Wyoming Republican Party		YouTube	N	P	N	P
2	Jul. 15, 2026	League of Women Voters of Wyoming; WyoFile; Wyoming Public Radio	Marilyn Kite	YouTube	P	N	P	P
3	Aug. 11, 2026	Central Wyoming College; Cowboy State Daily; Wyoming PBS; Wyoming Public Media	Steve Peck	YouTube	P	P	P	P

=== Results ===
Primary results by county: Short: 30–40%; 40–50%; 50–60%; 60–70%; Williams: 30–40%; 40–50%

Republican primary results
Party	Candidate	Votes	%
Republican	Robert Short	53,314	45.6
Republican	Rachel Rodriguez-Williams	38,567	33.0
Republican	Charles Young	17,846	15.3
Republican	Qwenton Eagle Oviatt	7,087	6.1
Total votes		116,814	100.0

== Democratic primary ==
=== Candidates ===
==== Nominee ====
- Bryan McCarty

=== Results ===
Democratic primary results
Party	Candidate	Votes	%
Democratic	Bryan McCarty	11,207	100.0
Total votes		11,207	100.0

== Third-party and independent candidates ==
=== Candidates ===
==== Declared ====
- Tamara Trujillo (Constitution), former Republican state representative from the 44th district (2023–2025)

== General election ==
=== Predictions ===
Source	Ranking	As of
Sabato's Crystal Ball	Safe R	August 7, 2025

== See also ==
- 2026 United States secretary of state elections
