= Rodney Wright (politician) =

American politician

Member-elect of the Arkansas Senate from the 16th district
- Assuming office January 2027
- Succeeding: Kim Hammer

Personal details
- Party: Republican

Rodney Wright is an American politician. A member of the Republican Party, he is the member-elect for the 16th district of the Arkansas Senate.
