= 2026 Colorado Secretary of State election =

Election for Colorado Secretary of State

- November 3, 2026

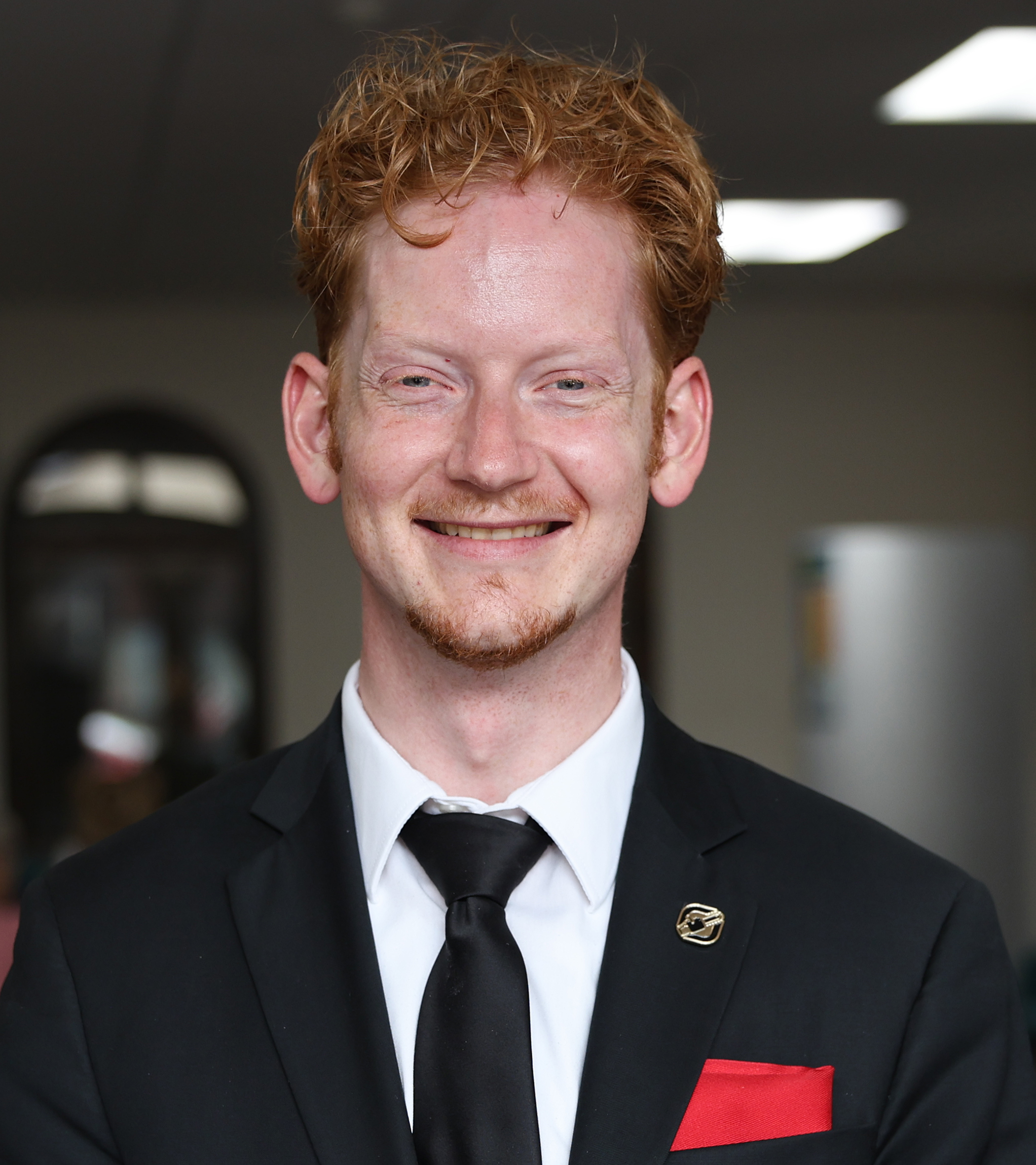
Nominee	Amanda Gonzalez	James Wiley
Party	Democratic	Republican
Popular vote	1,580,110	965,921
Percentage	60.2%	36.8%
- Gonzalez: 40–50% 50–60% 60–70% 70–80% 80–90% Wiley: 40–50% 50–60% 60–70% 70–80% 80–90%
Secretary of State before election
Jena Griswold
Democratic
Elected Secretary of State
Amanda Gonzalez
Democratic

The 2026 Colorado Secretary of State election took place on November 3, 2026, to elect the secretary of state of Colorado. Incumbent Democratic secretary Jena Griswold was term-limited and ineligible to seek reelection. Primary elections took place on June 30, 2026.

The general election featured Democratic candidate Amanda Gonzalez, an election official who serves as Jefferson county clerk and recorder and Republican nominee James Wiley, a political consultant who been described as an election denier who had spread misinformation and conspiracy theories about the legitimacy of elections. Candidates from three minor parties were also on the ballot.

== Background ==
Incumbent secretary of state Jena Griswold who previously won in 2018 and was reelected in 2022, was term-limited and instead ran successfully for Attorney General in 2026. Jefferson County clerk and recorder Amanda Gonzalez and state senator Jessie Danielson competed in the Democratic primary. Gonzalez won the primary with around 64% of the vote. The Republican candidate, James Wiley, ran unopposed.

=== Campaign ===
Before becoming Jefferson County clerk and recorder in 2022, Gonzalez served as director of Colorado Common Cause, an advocacy group that aims to increase ballot access to voters and limit the influence of money in politics. As Clerk and Recorder of Jefferson county, Gonzalez oversees election operations for the county. Throughout the primary and general election, Gonzalez has said she will advocate for voting rights and uphold Colorado's electoral system if elected. She has also said she will defend the state's mail-in ballot voting system, advocate for electoral transparency and streamline Colorado’s campaign finance site TRACER if elected.

Republican candidate James Wiley was previously director of the Libertarian Party of Colorado before switching party affiliations to run for secretary of state. Colorado Public Radio described Wiley as a "MAHA Republican", someone aligned with the pro-Trump political health movement. Wiley stated his belief that Donald Trump won the 2020 presidential election. Wiley stated that if elected, he planned to remove the entirety of the state's voter rolls and require every voter in the state to re-register in person to continue to vote. He also planned to decertify all electronic voting machines and end mail-in voting in the state if he had been elected. Several of his proposed polices were criticized by Republican and Democratic election experts as impractical, expensive, likely illegal under state and federal law, and a misunderstanding of election law. Wiley claimed that Communist countries control elections in the state and throughout America via electronic voting equipment. According to the election law organization States United Action, Wiley promoted conspiracies theories and misinformation about the legitimacy of elections.

== Democratic primary ==
=== Candidates ===
To move forward to the primary, candidates had to petition onto the ballot or achieve 30% or more at the Colorado Democratic Party State Assembly. No candidate petitioned onto the primary ballot. Both Amanda Gonzalez and Jessie Danielson went through the State Assembly process. Both candidates achieved 30% or more.

==== Nominee ====
- Amanda Gonzalez, Jefferson County clerk and recorder

==== Eliminated in primary ====
- Jessie Danielson, state senator from the 22nd district (2019–present)

==== Declined ====
- Jeff Bridges, state senator from the 26th district (2019–present) (running for state treasurer)

=== Endorsements ===
Jessie Danielson

State legislators

- Rhonda Fields, former state senator from the 28th district (2017–2025)

Labor unions

- SEIU Colorado
- UFCW Local 7

Organizations

- Southern Ute Indian Tribe

Newspapers

- The Denver Post
Amanda Gonzalez

Organizations

- Latino Victory Fund
- LGBTQ Victory Fund
- LPAC
- New American Leaders Action Fund
- Our Revolution

Political parties

- Colorado Working Families Party

=== Results ===
Primary results by county: Gonzalez: 50–60%; 60–70%; 70–80%; 80–90%; Danielson: 50–60%

Democratic primary results
Party	Candidate	Votes	%
Democratic	Amanda Gonzalez	530,299	64.4
Democratic	Jessie Danielson	293,351	35.6
Total votes		823,650	100.0

== Republican primary ==
=== Candidates ===
==== Nominee ====
- James Wiley, former executive director of the Libertarian Party of Colorado

=== Results ===
Republican primary results
Party	Candidate	Votes	%
Republican	James Wiley	445,626	100.0
Total votes		445,626	100.0

== Libertarian primary ==
=== Candidates ===
==== Nominee ====
- Sean Vadney

==== Withdrawn ====
- Alex Astley

=== Results ===
Libertarian primary results
Party	Candidate	Votes	%
Libertarian	Alex Astley	2,204	61.9
Libertarian	Sean Vadney	1,357	38.1
Total votes		3,561	100.0

Following Alex Astley's "suspicious" withdrawal from the race one day after the deadline to replace third party candidates, the Libertarian Party of Colorado's vacancy committee nominated Sean Vadney. This nomination was originally blocked by the Colorado Secretary of State's office, however Denver District Court Judge Adam J. Espinosa approved a motion filed by Vadney putting him on the general election ballot, citing that the party met "substantial compliance".

== Independents ==
=== Declared ===
- Amanda Campbell (American Constitution)
- Celeste Landry (Forward)
- Sean Vadney (Libertarian)

=== Filed paperwork ===
- Melissa Richards

== General election ==
=== Predictions ===
Source	Ranking	As of
Sabato's Crystal Ball	Safe D	October 29, 2026

=== Post-primary endorsements ===
Amanda Gonzalez (D)

Organizations

- EMILYs List
- Everytown for Gun Safety
- National Women's Political Caucus

=== Polling ===
Poll source	Date(s) administered	Sample size (Note: Key: A – all adults RV – registered voters LV – likely voters V – unclear)	Margin of error	Amanda Gonzalez (D)	James Wiley (R)	Other	Undecided
CU Boulder/YouGov	October 9–20, 2026	710 (LV)	± 4.5%	56%	38%	6% (Note: "I would not vote" with 5%; "Other" with 1%)	—

=== Results ===
2026 Colorado Secretary of State election
Party	Candidate	Votes	%	±%
Democratic	Amanda Gonzalez	1,571,973	60.1%	
Republican	James Wiley	963,863	36.8%	
American Constitution	Amanda Campbell	21,212	0.8%	
Forward	Celeste Landry	17,423	0.7%	
Libertarian	Sean Vadney	41,571	1.6%	
Total votes		2,616,042	100.0%	
Democratic hold				

== See also ==
- 2026 United States Senate election in Colorado
