= Kim Hammer =

American politician

Arkansas Secretary of State-elect
- Assuming office January 2027
- Governor: Sarah Huckabee Sanders
- Succeeding: Cole Jester

Member of the Arkansas Senate
- Incumbent
- Assumed office January 19, 2019
- Preceded by: Jeremy Young Hutchinson
- Succeeded by: Rodney Wright (elect)
- Constituency: 33rd district (2019–2023); 16th district (2023–present)

Member of the Arkansas House of Representatives from the 28th district
- In office January 10, 2011 – January 19, 2019
- Preceded by: Barbara Nix
- Succeeded by: Jasen Kelly

Personal details
- Born: August 11, 1958 (age 68) Damascus, Arkansas, U.S.
- Party: Republican
- Education: Trinity College of the Bible and Theological Seminary (BA)

Kim Davin Hammer (born 11 August 1958) is a Missionary Baptist preacher and politician who is the Arkansas Secretary of State-elect. He has served in the Arkansas Senate since 2019. A Republican, he was previously a member of the Arkansas House of Representatives from 2011 to 2019. He hosts a weekly conservative talk radio show.

== Biography ==
Hammer was a member of the Arkansas House of Representatives for eight years before being elected to the state Senate in 2018. He lives in Benton, Arkansas.

In 2020, during the COVID-19 pandemic in Arkansas, Hammer was one of several Republican state legislators who sued Arkansas Governor Asa Hutchinson, a fellow Republican, over public health measures that he ordered to prevent the spread of the virus. An Arkansas judge dismissed the suit.

In 2021, Hammer promoted Donald Trump's false claim that the 2020 presidential election was "stolen"; after Trump was impeached for a second time, wrote in a Facebook post that Democrats were "enemies" and called for "political war" to be waged against them. Hammer deleted the post after it garnered criticism. In 2021, as part of Republican efforts to restrict voting following Trump's defeat, Hammer introduced a bill to eliminate early voting in Arkansas on the last Monday before Election Day, a measure that voting-rights groups described as voter suppression. The bill passed the Senate on a 19–13 vote, but failed in the state House on a 43–39 vote.

In 2021, Hammer opposed the grant of a liquor-sales permit for a new Costco Wholesale in west Little Rock, a portion of which is in his district. Hammer wrote a letter to the director of the Alcohol Beverage Control Division, contending that the public's needs were "being adequately met by these existing businesses." By contrast, Little Rock's mayor and vice mayor supported Costco's permit request. The director initially denied Costco's permit application, but this decision was reversed after a successful appeal by Costco to the Control Board directors.

=== 2026 campaign for Secretary of State ===
Hammer is running for Arkansas Secretary of State in 2026. He faced fellow Republicans Bryan Norris and Cathy Hardin Harrison in the primary election, held on March 3. He placed second, receiving 33.6% of the vote, narrowly trailing Norris, who had received 34.3% of the vote. Because no candidate received a majority of the vote, Hammer advanced to a March 31 runoff against Norris. In the runoff, Hammer narrowly defeated Norris, receiving 50.56% of the vote.
