= Robert Short (politician) =

Secretary of State-elect of Wyoming
- Assuming office January 4, 2027
- Governor: Eric Barlow (elect)
- Succeeding: Chuck Gray

Commissioner of Converse County
- Incumbent
- Assumed office 2014

Personal details
- Born: 1961 or 1962 (age 64–65) Wyoming, U.S.
- Party: Republican
- Education: Denver Institute of Technology (BS)

Robert Short (born 1961 or 1962) is an American businessman and politician who is the Secretary of State-elect of Wyoming. He has served as a county commissioner for Converse County, Wyoming, since 2014. Short was elected during the 2026 Wyoming Secretary of State election.

== Early life ==
Short was born in Wyoming and grew up in Glenrock, where he attended Glenrock High School. He said he received his first job at age 12 on a ranch, then worked at 16 for an oil patch, at 17 constructing power lines, and at 18 working in a uranium mine. Short attended Denver Institute of Technology where he was an electrical engineering and computer science student. After college, he worked in technology and nuclear science before moving back to Wyoming in 2005. According to the Wyoming Tribune-Eagle, Short is an expert on nuclear energy. In Wyoming, he became an entrepreneur and started "businesses that span energy, agriculture, retail and tourism industries", according to Oil City News. Short is married and has four children. He lives in Douglas.

== Political career ==
A member of the Republican Party, Short won election as a county commissioner for Converse County, Wyoming, in 2014. He won re-election to the office twice. He has served as vice president of the Wyoming County Commissioners Association. Short was a candidate in the Republican primary in the 2020 United States Senate election in Wyoming, seeking to succeed the retiring Mike Enzi, but lost by a large margin to Cynthia Lummis.

In March 2026, Short declared his candidacy in the 2026 Wyoming Secretary of State election to succeed Chuck Gray, who declined to run again in order to seek election to the United States House of Representatives. In his campaign, he described his priorities as combating scams affecting older Wyoming citizens, increasing trust in elections, and "increas[ing] accountability for businesses that utilize registered agents while preserving LLC laws that protect legitimate businesses". As Gray received attention for his claims regarding electoral fraud and election security during his tenure, Short made his campaign slogan "Make the Secretary of State's Office boring again". He won the Republican primary against three others. Short faced Democratic Party nominee Bryan McCarty and Constitution Party nominee Tamara Trujillo in the general election. Short won the election in a landslide with 67.6% of the vote. He is expected to assume office on January 4, 2027.
