= Michael Howe (politician) =

American politician

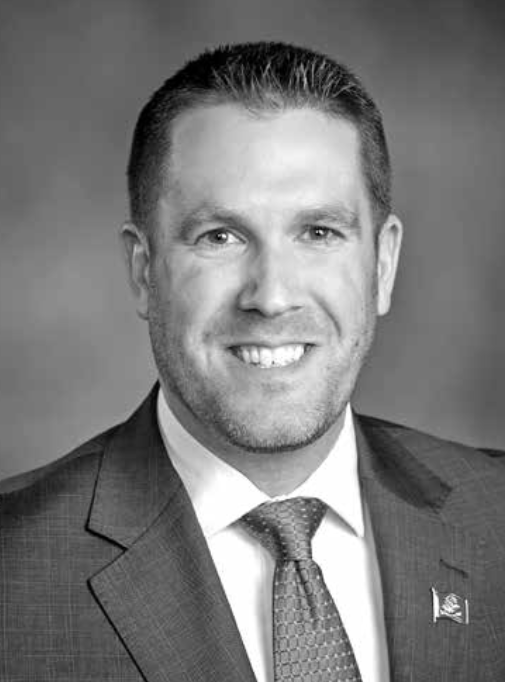
- Howe in 2023

Secretary of State of North Dakota
- Incumbent
- Assumed office January 1, 2023
- Governor: Doug Burgum; Kelly Armstrong
- Preceded by: Alvin Jaeger

Member of the North Dakota House of Representatives from the 22nd district
- In office December 1, 2016 – November 9, 2022
- Preceded by: Wesley Belter
- Succeeded by: Jonathan Warrey

Personal details
- Born: September 20, 1986 (age 40)
- Party: Republican
- Spouse: Katie Ralston
- Education: North Dakota State University (BS)

Michael C. Howe (born September 20, 1986) is an American politician serving as the North Dakota Secretary of State. Elected in November 2022, he assumed office on January 1, 2023.

== Early life and education ==
Michael Howe was born September 20, 1986. Howe earned a Bachelor of Science degree in broadcast journalism and mass communication from North Dakota State University in 2010.

== Career ==
In 2011 and 2012, Howe served as a legislative correspondent and legislative assistant for Congressman Rick Berg. He also served as an agricultural policy advisor to Berg. In 2013, he was the director of legislative affairs and communications director for the North Dakota Corn Growers Association.

Howe was the campaign manager of Kelly Armstrong's successful 2018 campaign to represent North Dakota in the U.S. House of Representatives.

== North Dakota House of Representatives ==
Howe was elected to the North Dakota House of Representatives in 2016 and assumed office on December 1, 2016. Howe served as a member of the House Water Topics Overview Committee.

After winning election to be the Secretary of State, Howe resigned from the House on November 9, 2022. Local Republicans appointed Jonathan Warrey to the fill Howe's vacancy.

== North Dakota Secretary of State ==
In January 2022, Howe declared his candidacy for North Dakota secretary of state in that years midterm elections as the incumbent secretary, Alvin Jaeger, opted to retire after seven terms in office. Howe defeated rancher Marvin Lepp in the republican primary and went on to beat university administrator and Democratic-NPL nominee Jeffrey Powell and independent candidate Charles Tuttle in the general election with over 60% of the vote.

Howe's office has launched numerous efforts to get easier access for elections to new U.S. citizens.

In September 2023, Howe defended a ban on ballot measures led by individuals and groups from outside of North Dakota, which was primarily for a measure that would have set term limits for congressional members in the state.

In November 2023, Howe and North Dakota Attorney General Drew Wrigley appealed a ruling by district judge Peter Welte that forced the state to redraw its legislative districts ahead of the 2024 elections that forced the state to give the Spirit Lake Tribe and Turtle Mountain Indian Reservation their own specific district. The appeal was heard by the 8th Circuit Court of Appeals, and the court ruled in favor of the state the next year, which under the ruling would mean only the United States Department of Justice could bring Voting Rights Act lawsuits, which would negate the lawsuit by the NAACP that forced the new districts in North Dakota. However, the United States Supreme Court paused the ruling in 2025 and as of July is pending review by the court.

In May 2024, Howe was critical of a bill in congress that would have tightened ID checking for voting to protect against illegal immigrants and noncitizens from voting, stating that the bill would force North Dakota into doing voter registration and that the state already has protections against it.

== Personal life ==
Howe's wife, Katie Ralston Howe, is the Former Miss North Dakota and served as Governor Doug Burgum's Workforce Development director. She has continued to hold the position into the gubernatorial term of Kelly Armstrong.

Party political offices
Preceded by Will Gardner	Republican nominee for Secretary of State of North Dakota; 2022	Most recent
Political offices
Preceded by Alvin Jaeger	Secretary of State of North Dakota; 2023–present	Incumbent
