= Amanda Gonzalez (politician) =

American politician (born 1984/5)

Secretary of State of Colorado
- Elect
- Assuming office January 2027
- Governor: Phil Weiser (elect)
- Succeeding: Jena Griswold

Personal details
- Born: 1984 or 1985 (age 41–42)
- Party: Democratic
- Education: Occidental College (BA); University of Denver (JD)

Amanda Gonzalez (born 1984/1985) is an American politician and election official who is the Secretary of State-elect of Colorado. She is also an adjunct professor of election law at the University of Denver serving as the clerk and recorder of Jefferson County, Colorado, a position she has held since January 10, 2023. She previously worked in voting-rights advocacy and election policy in Colorado, including as executive director of Colorado Common Cause.

Upon inauguration, Gonzalez will become the first Latina to hold a statewide office in Colorado.

== Personal life and education ==
Gonzalez attended Occidental College, where she earned a Bachelor of Arts. She went on to receive a law degree from the Sturm College of Law at the University of Denver. She identifies as an LGBT woman.

== Career ==
=== Advocacy and policy work ===
Before holding elected office, Gonzalez worked in election policy and voting-rights advocacy in Colorado. She served as executive director of Colorado Common Cause and helped draft Amendments Y and Z, ballot measures that created Colorado's independent redistricting commissions, after voters approved them in 2018. She was also involved in efforts to expand multilingual ballot access in the state. Colorado enacted House Bill 21–1011 in 2021, broadening requirements for ballots in multiple languages.

In 2022, Time profiled Gonzalez in an article about Democratic efforts to contest local election administration seats that had drawn interest from candidates who questioned the results of the 2020 presidential election.

=== Jefferson County clerk and recorder ===
As clerk and recorder, Gonzalez oversees elections for nearly 450,000 active registered voters in Jefferson County, along with other services administered by the office.

In 2023, the county adopted new county commissioner district maps following a public redistricting process that included hearings and opportunities for residents to submit proposed maps and comments.

Gonzalez' work includes stopping the spread of misinformation and disinformation. She spoke about ballot barcodes, a common source of misinformation, following a related, proposed federal executive order.

==== Jail-based voting ====
Gonzalez identified low voting rates among eligible, incarcerated voters. This led her to work with partners to bring Senate Bill 24-072 forward. The 2024 Colorado law requires county jails to offer in-person voting access for eligible confined voters. During debate on the bill, she cited low participation in mail voting from the Jefferson County jail in prior elections as evidence for the need for in-person access. After implementation, the number of ballots cast from the Jefferson County jail rose from three in 2022 to more than 300 in 2024.

==== Recognition ====
The Jefferson County Clerk and Recorder's office received U.S. Election Assistance Commission Clearinghouse Awards in consecutive years: in 2023 for Distinguished Voter Education and Communications Initiatives, and in 2024 for Innovations or New Practices in Election Administration.

== 2026 Colorado Secretary of State campaign ==
On January 6, 2025, Gonzalez announced her candidacy for Colorado Secretary of State in the 2026 election. New York Magazine subsequently included her on its 2025 list of "Young(ish) New Democrats to Watch."

As of March 28, 2026, she was officially placed on the democratic primary ballot. She earned 63.1% of the vote at state assembly. Gonzalez and state senator Jessie Danielson competed in the Democratic primary. Gonzalez won the primary with around 64% of the vote.

Throughout the primary and general election, Gonzalez has said she will advocate for voting rights and uphold Colorado's electoral system if elected. She has also said she will defend the state's mail-in ballot voting system, advocate for electoral transparency and streamline Colorado's campaign finance site TRACER if elected. Gonzalez won the general election.

== Election history ==
=== 2022 election ===
Incumbent Jefferson County Clerk and Recorder George Stern chose not to seek re-election after one term and Gonzalez entered the race in January 2022. She won the Democratic primary and faced Vicki Pyne, who ran unopposed in the Republican primary, in the general election.

Jefferson County Colorado General Election: November 8, 2022
Party	Candidate	Votes	%	±%
Democratic	Amanda Gonzalez	163,927	57.14%	+14.28
Republican	Vicki Pyne	122,942	42.86%	−14.28

Political offices
Preceded by Jena Griswold	Secretary of State of Colorado; Taking office 2027	Elect
