= 2022 North Dakota Secretary of State election =

- November 8, 2022
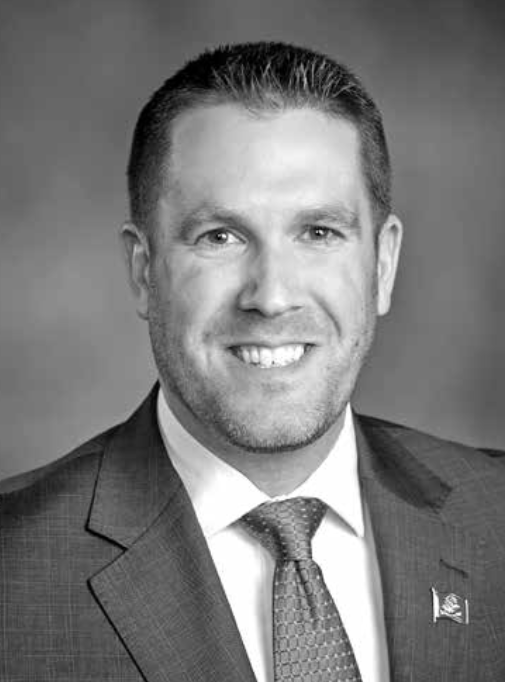

Nominee	Michael Howe	Jeffrey Powell	Charles Tuttle
Party	Republican	Democratic–NPL	Independent
Popular vote	147,816	64,254	21,517
Percentage	63.2%	27.5%	9.2%
- County results Howe: 50–60% 60–70% 70–80% 80–90% Powell: 50–60%
Secretary of State before election
Alvin Jaeger
Republican
Elected Secretary of State
Michael Howe
Republican

The 2022 North Dakota Secretary of State election was held on November 8, 2022, to elect the next secretary of state of North Dakota. Incumbent Independent Alvin Jaeger did not seek reelection to an eighth term.

== Republican primary ==
=== Candidates ===
==== Nominee ====
- Michael Howe, state representative from the 22nd district (2016–present)

==== Eliminated in primary ====
- Marvin Lepp, businessman

==== Declined ====
- Alvin Jaeger, incumbent secretary of state

== Democratic-NPL primary ==
=== Candidates ===
==== Nominee ====
- Jeffrey Powell, university administrator

== Independent ==
=== Candidates ===
==== Declared ====
- Charles Tuttle, candidate for North Dakota's at-large congressional district in 2018 and North Dakota Superintendent of Public Instruction in 2020

== General election ==
=== Predictions ===
Source	Ranking	As of
Sabato's Crystal Ball	Safe R	December 1, 2021
Elections Daily	Safe R	November 7, 2022

=== Results ===
2022 North Dakota Secretary of State election
Party	Candidate	Votes	%	±%
Republican	Michael Howe (incumbent)	147,816	63.2%	N/A
Democratic–NPL	Jeffrey Powell	64,254	27.5%	−13.6%
Independent	Charles Tuttle	21,517	9.2%	N/A
Write-in		241	0.1%	N/A
Total votes		233,828	100.0%	
Republican hold				

==== By county ====
County	Michael Howe Republican		Jeffrey Powell Democratic–NPL		Charles Tuttle Independent		All Others	
County	#	%	#	%	#	%	#	%
Adams	687	76.2%	146	16.2%	7.6	6.9%	0	0.0%
Barnes	2,320	61.4%	1,086	28.8%	367	9.7%	3	0.1%
Benson	753	52.2%	534	37.0%	154	10.7%	1	0.1%
Billings	421	79.9%	44	8.3%	61	11.6%	1	0.2%
Bottineau	2,004	71.8%	535	19.2%	249	8.9%	3	0.1%
Bowman	1,044	78.6%	166	12.5%	116	8.7%	2	0.2%
Burke	584	77.1%	93	12.3%	80	10.6%	0	0.0%
Burleigh	22,533	65.4%	8,424	24.5%	3,435	10.0%	53	0.2%
Cass	27,497	52.1%	21,557	40.9%	3,635	6.9%	58	0.1%
Cavalier	1,058	70.8%	320	21.4%	115	7.7%	2	0.1%
Dickey	1,231	70.8%	373	21.4%	130	7.5%	5	0.3%
Divide	711	71.7%	200	20.2%	81	8.2%	0	0.0%
Dunn	1,244	77.1%	219	13.6%	151	9.4%	0	0.0%
Eddy	595	65.2%	226	24.8%	90	9.9%	1	0.1%
Emmons	1,181	80.1%	129	8.8%	161	10.9%	3	0.2%
Foster	866	71.1%	222	18.2%	129	10.6%	1	0.1%
Golden Valley	584	77.6%	94	12.5%	74	9.8%	1	0.1%
Grand Forks	10,303	56.0%	6,817	37.1%	1,257	6.8%	16	0.1%
Grant	871	80.2%	128	11.8%	87	8.0%	0	0.0%
Griggs	669	70.1%	217	22.7%	68	7.1%	1	0.1%
Hettinger	785	77.5%	147	14.5%	80	7.9%	1	0.1%
Kidder	740	71.2%	152	14.6%	146	14.1%	1	0.1%
LaMoure	1,142	70.8%	353	21.9%	117	7.3%	0	0.0%
Logan	608	77.5%	96	12.2%	80	10.2%	0	0.0%
McHenry	1,506	70.9%	362	17.1%	253	11.9%	2	0.1%
McIntosh	825	76.4%	154	14.3%	101	9.4%	0	0.0%
McKenzie	2,436	78.1%	429	13.8%	245	7.9%	9	0.3%
McLean	2,863	69.1%	868	21.0%	408	9.9%	3	0.1%
Mercer	2,691	76.6%	503	14.3%	318	9.0%	3	0.1%
Morton	7,514	68.4%	2,272	20.7%	1,178	10.7%	14	0.1%
Mountrail	1,630	63.2%	683	26.5%	264	10.2%	1	0.1%
Nelson	899	61.4%	441	30.1%	121	8.3%	2	0.1%
Oliver	608	75.3%	101	12.5%	97	12.0%	1	0.1%
Pembina	1,739	72.9%	452	19.0%	192	8.1%	1	0.01%
Pierce	970	66.1%	296	20.2%	200	13.6%	1	0.1%
Ramsey	2,510	64.2%	972	24.8%	428	10.9%	2	0.1%
Ransom	998	56.3%	566	31.9%	208	11.7%	2	0.1%
Renville	653	74.9%	115	13.2%	104	11.9%	0	0.0%
Richland	3,623	63.6%	1,564	27.5%	505	8.9%	3	0.1%
Rolette	961	36.2%	1,390	52.3%	301	11.3%	4	0.2%
Sargent	905	59.2%	473	30.9%	151	9.9%	0	0.0%
Sheridan	463	75.7%	79	12.9%	70	11.4%	0	0.0%
Sioux	173	30.2%	319	55.7%	80	14.0%	2	0.1%
Slope	254	85.5%	27	9.1%	16	5.4%	0	0.0%
Stark	6,502	73.4%	1,292	14.6%	158	12.0%	1	0.01%
Steele	447	58.3%	246	32.1%	73	9.5%	1	0.1%
Stutsman	4,276	66.4%	1,547	24.0%	615	9.5%	5	0.1%
Towner	539	64.9%	208	25.0%	83	10.0%	1	0.1%
Traill	1,760	60.4%	898	30.8%	249	8.5%	6	0.2%
Walsh	2,303	68.8%	749	22.4%	293	8.8%	3	0.1%
Ward	10,846	66.1%	3,682	22.4%	1,874	11.4%	17	0.1%
Wells	1,189	71.5%	256	15.4%	217	13.0%	1	0.1%
Williams	5,302	73.4%	1,032	14.3%	883	12.2%	3	0.1%
Totals	147,816	63.2%	64,254	27.5%	21,517	9.2%	241	0.1%

Counties that flipped from Democratic to Republican

- Benson (largest CDP: Fort Totten)
- Grand Forks (largest city: Grand Forks)
- Ransom (largest city: Lisbon)
- Sargent (largest city: Gwinner)
- Steele (largest city: Finley)
- Cass (largest city: Fargo)
- Richland (largest city: Wahpeton)
