= Cole Jester =

American politician (born 1997)

35th Secretary of State of Arkansas
- Incumbent
- Assumed office January 1, 2025
- Governor: Sarah Huckabee Sanders
- Preceded by: John Thurston

Personal details
- Born: 1997 (age 28–29) Benton, Arkansas, U.S.
- Party: Republican
- Education: Ouachita Baptist University (BA); University of Virginia (JD)

Cole Jester (born 1997) is an American politician and constitutional lawyer who is the 35th secretary of state of Arkansas. He was appointed to the position by Governor Sarah Huckabee Sanders after his predecessor John Thurston resigned to become state treasurer. At 29 years old, he is the youngest secretary of state in Arkansas history.

Jester was previously Deputy Chief Legal Counsel for Sanders for two years.

Before joining the Governor’s Office, Jester worked for the United States Court of Appeals for the Eighth Circuit. While attending the University of Virginia School of Law, he clerked for the firm of Friday, Eldridge, & Clark, worked for the United States Air Force, and argued criminal cases in Virginia district court. He was also the managing editor of The Journal of Law and Politics.

Jester is an Arkansas native who graduated valedictorian of Benton High School and summa cum laude from Ouachita Baptist University with a degree in Christian Studies as well as political science. He received his Juris Doctor from the University of Virginia School of Law.

Political offices
Preceded by John Thurston	Secretary of State of Arkansas; 2025–present	Incumbent
