= Lawrence, Kansas =

- City and county seat
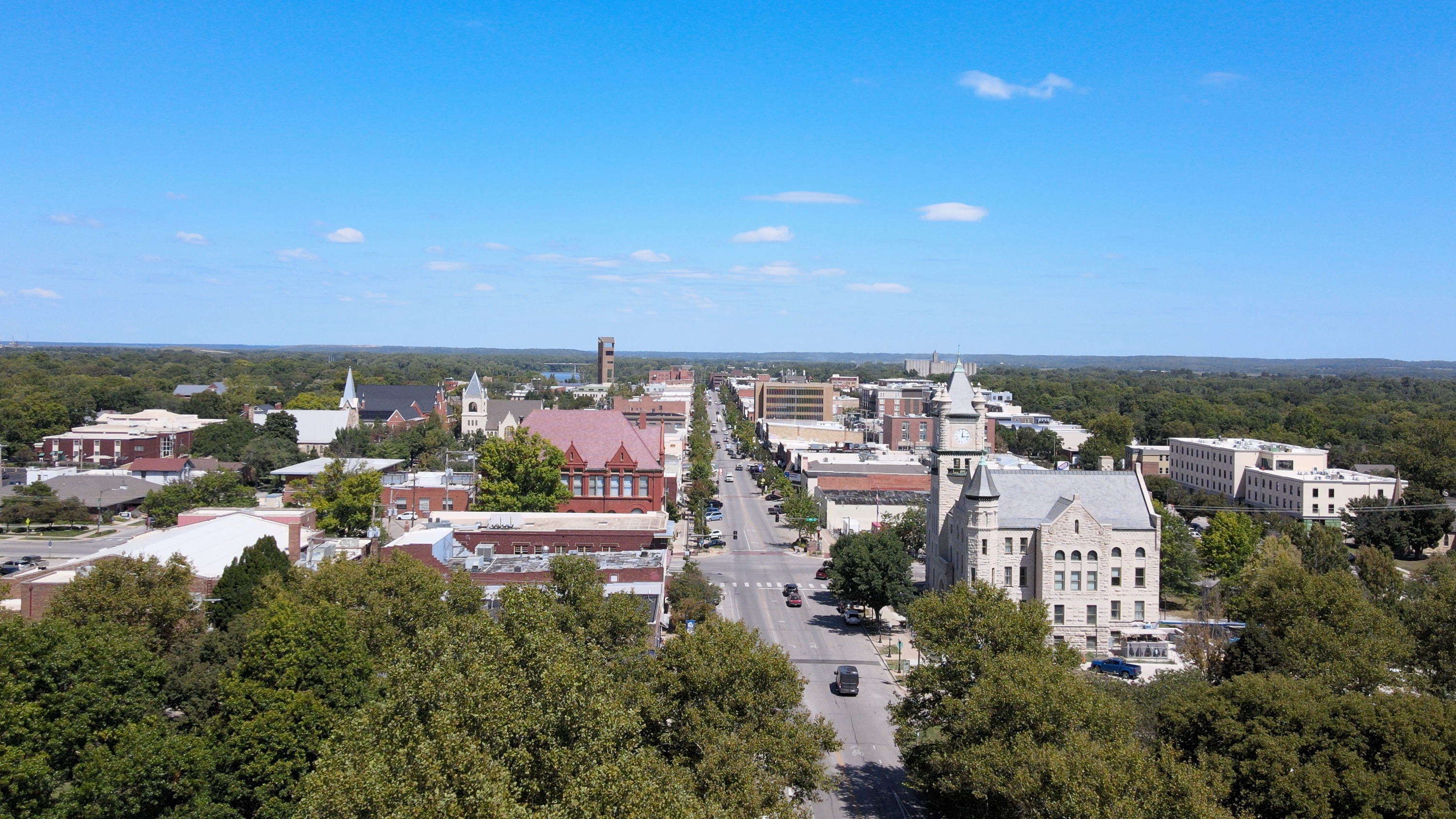
- Aerial view of downtown Lawrence (2025)

- Seal Logo
- Nicknames: LFK, Larryville
- Motto: From Ashes to Immortality
- Location within Douglas County and Kansas
- Interactive map of Lawrence, Kansas
- Coordinates: 38°57′35″N 95°15′51″W
- Country: United States
- State: Kansas
- County: Douglas
- Founded: 1854
- Incorporated: February 20, 1858
- Named for: Amos A. Lawrence

Government
  - Type: City commission
  - Mayor: Brad Finkeldei
  - City manager: Majed Al-Ghafry

Area
  - Total: 34.97 sq mi (90.57 km^{2})
  - Land: 34.14 sq mi (88.42 km^{2})
  - Water: 0.83 sq mi (2.14 km^{2})
- Elevation: 991 ft (302 m)

Population (2020)
  - Total: 94,934
  - Estimate (2024): 97,271 ▲
  - Density: 2,781/sq mi (1,074/km^{2})
- Time zone: UTC−6 (CST)
  - Summer (DST): UTC−5 (CDT)
- ZIP Codes: 66044–66047, 66049
- Area code: 785
- FIPS code: 20-38900
- GNIS ID: 485609
- Interstate highway: I-70
- Public transportation: Lawrence Transit
- Website: lawrenceks.gov

Lawrence is a city in and the county seat of Douglas County, Kansas, United States, and the sixth-largest city in the state. It is in the northeastern sector of the state, astride Interstate 70, between the Kansas and Wakarusa rivers. As of the 2020 census, the population of the city was 94,934. The city is a college town with a significant student population, because it is home to both the University of Kansas (KU) and Haskell Indian Nations University (HINU).

Lawrence was founded by the New England Emigrant Aid Company (NEEAC) and was named for Amos A. Lawrence, an abolitionist from Massachusetts, who offered financial aid and support for the settlement. Lawrence was central to the Bleeding Kansas period (1854–1861), and the site of the Wakarusa War (1855) and the Sacking of Lawrence (1856). During the American Civil War it was also the site of the Lawrence massacre (1863).

Lawrence began as a center of free-state politics. Its economy diversified into many industries, including agriculture, manufacturing, and education, beginning with the founding of the University of Kansas in 1865 and Haskell Indian Nations University in 1884.

== History ==
=== Settlement and early years ===
The Kaw people, also known as the Kansa, settled the region including what is now Lawrence in the late 17th or early 18th century. A series of treaties with the U.S. government compelled the Kaw to relinquish the land to the Shawnee and their Indian Reservation, established in 1830. The Kansas Territory was established in May 1854. During this period, the Oregon Trail ran parallel to the Kansas River, roughly through the area where Lawrence is now. A hill in the area, then known as Hogback Ridge and now known as Mount Oread, which sits on the water divide separating the Kansas and Wakarusa River, was used as a landmark and outlook by those on the trail. While the territory was technically closed to settlement until 1854, there were a few "squatter settlements" in the area, especially just north of the Kansas River.

Lawrence was founded "strictly for political reasons" having to do with slavery, which was heavily debated in the United States in the early to mid-1800s. Northern Democrats, led by Senators Lewis Cass of Michigan and Stephen A. Douglas of Illinois, promoted "popular sovereignty" as a middle position on the slavery issue. Its proponents argued it was more democratic, as it allowed the citizens of newly organized territories (and not Washington, D.C. politicians) to have a direct say as to the legality of slavery in their own lands. (Meanwhile, enemies of the bill, especially in the north, derisively called this idea "squatter sovereignty".) Douglas eventually made popular sovereignty the backbone of his Kansas–Nebraska Act—legislation that effectively repealed the Missouri Compromise of 1820 and created the territories of Kansas and Nebraska—which passed Congress in 1854.

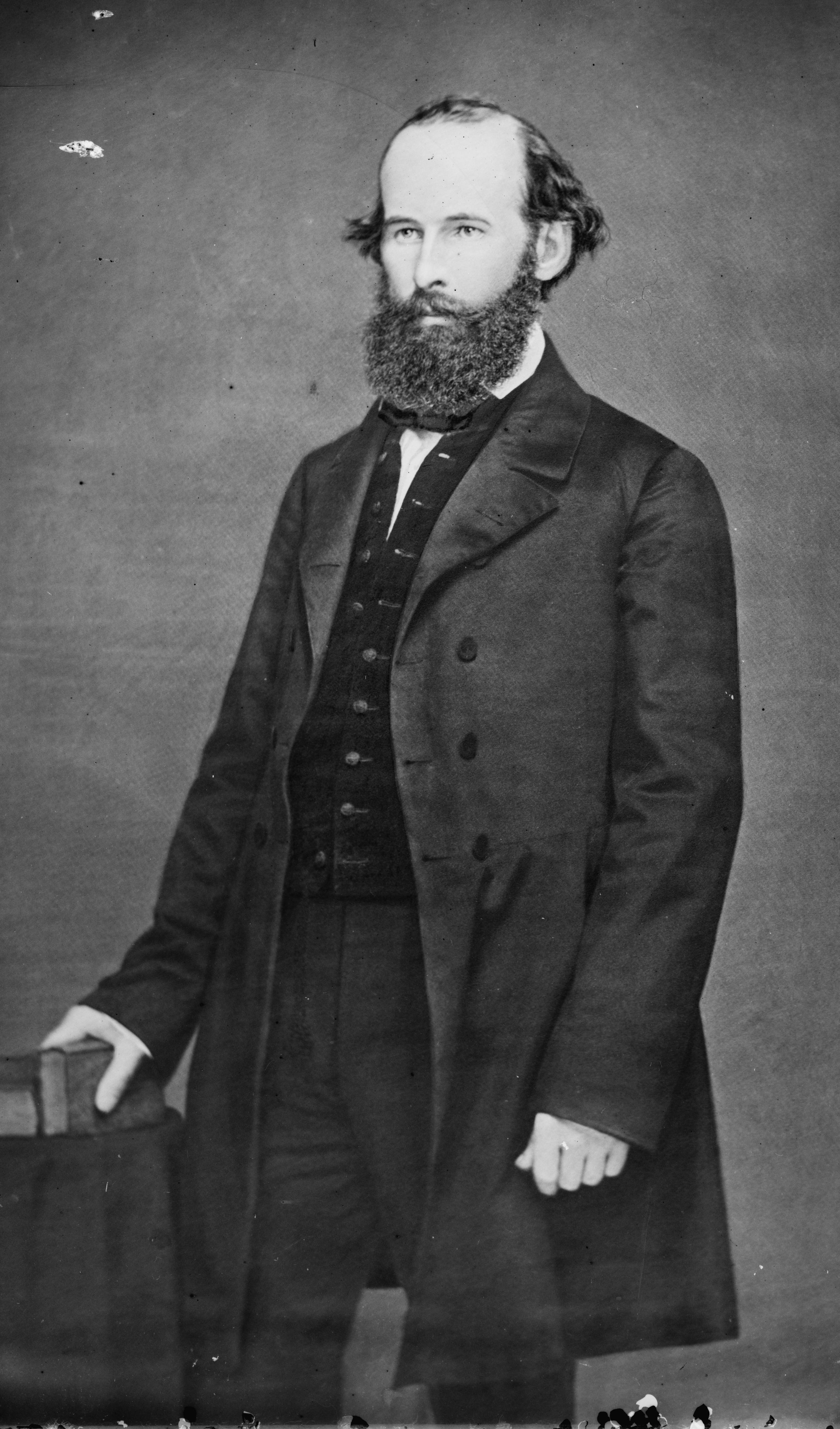
Lawrence was founded by settlers affiliated with the New England Emigrant Aid Company, headed by Eli Thayer, a Republican in the United States House of Representatives.

The Christian abolitionist and Protestant minister Richard Cordley later noted that after the bill became law, "there was a feeling of despondency all over the north" because its passage "opened Kansas to [the possibility of] slavery [which many] thought [was] equivalent to making Kansas a slave state". This was largely because nearby Missouri allowed slavery, and many rightly assumed the first settlers in Kansas Territory would come from Missouri, bringing their penchant for slavery with them.

In time, anger at the Kansas–Nebraska Act united antislavery forces into a movement committed to stopping the expansion of slavery, eventually institutionalized as the Republican Party. Many slavery opponents decided to "meet the question [of slavery in Kansas] on the terms of the bill itself" by migrating to Kansas, electing antislavery legislators, and eventually banning slavery altogether. These settlers soon became known as "Free-Staters". Even before the bill passed, some people already had this idea. In early May 1854, four men—Thomas W. and Oliver P. Barber, Samuel Walker, and Thomas M. Pearson—toured the new territory with the intention of finding a good place to settle. Their travels included what would become Lawrence, passing up on the spur of Hogback Ridge. The Kansas-Nebraska Act passed while they were in the territory, and they were instrumental in convincing others to come. In his book A History of Lawrence (1895), Cordley wrote:

The most systematic and extensive movement [to populate Kansas], however, was made [by] "The New England Emigrant Aid Company" ... The men engaged in it, Eli Thayer [a Republican in the United States House of Representatives], Amos A. Lawrence [a Republican abolitionist and businessman], and others, began their work at once, arousing public interest and making arrangements to facilitate emigration to Kansas. As early as June, 1854, they sent Dr. Charles Robinson, of Fitchburg, and Mr. Charles H. Branscomb, of Holyoke, to explore the territory and select a site for a colony ... [Previously] Robinson [had journeyed to Kansas, during which] his party climbed the hill along this spur, and looked off over what was afterwards the site of Lawrence. They marked the beauty of the spot and the magnificence of the view. Whether they thought then of what might afterwards occur is not known; but when the time came to select a location for the first colony, Dr. Robinson remembered this view from the hilltop, and this doubtless had much to do in the final decision. When he was asked, therefore, to go and explore the country with a view to locating colonies, it was not altogether an unknown land to him.

Branscomb was tasked with exploring the Kansas River up to about Fort Riley, while Robinson scouted land near Fort Leavenworth and the nearby city of the same name; after assessing the territory they had surveyed, the two recommended the New England Emigrant Aid Company (NEEAC) send its settlers to claim territory along the Oregon Trail near Hogback Ridge. The two likely chose this site because it was the "first desirable location where emigrant Indians had ceded their land rights". The area was also attractive because it was close to not only on the Oregon Trail, but also the Santa Fe and the 1846 Military Trails.

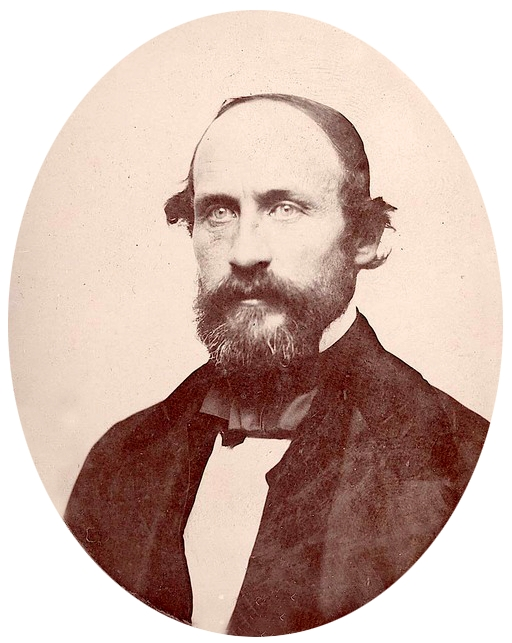
Charles L. Robinson was instrumental in the founding of Lawrence.

Concurrent with Robinson and Branscomb's exploration, the NEEAC was soliciting some of its members to settle in Kansas. At first, the NEEAC wanted to send a somewhat sizeable group of settlers to claim the land, but a cholera outbreak in the Missouri Valley prevented it. In the end, a group of only 29 men—which Eli Thayer later called the "pioneer colony"—volunteered for the job. Led by Branscomb, these pioneers left Boston, Massachusetts, and set out for Kansas Territory on July 17, 1854; according to Thayer's antislavery newspaper the Kansas Crusader for Freedom, "Immense crowds had gathered [in Boston] at the station to give them a parting God-speed. They moved out of the station amid the cheering of the crowds who lined the track for several blocks." In late July, the group met Robinson in St. Louis, and he discussed the next leg of the journey with them and provided them with transportation. The pioneers arrived in Kansas Territory near the end of July, and at about noon on August 1, they ate their first meal on Hogback Ridge itself, which was soon renamed Mount Oread after the Oread Institute in Worcester, Massachusetts. Immediately thereafter, about half this party set off to claim land in the nearby countryside, where about 15 of the original settlers remained, and began to establish a city between Mount Oread and the Kansas River roughly where Massachusetts Street now runs.

While all of this was unfolding, a followup party of 67, guided by Robinson and Samuel C. Pomeroy (an abolitionist and a Republican member of the United States House of Representatives), left Worcester, Massachusetts, on August 31; along the way to Kansas, settlers of similar political inclinations joined this group, and when the party reached its destination on September 9–11, it had grown to about 114 people. This second party included about ten women, a number of children, and several musicians. A third group of settlers arrived in the vicinity of the future city on October 8–9, but many "became disgusted by the outlook" of the settlement and returned to New England, feeling they had been "deceived" by the NEEAC. A fourth group of settlers arrived on October 30, followed by a fifth on November 20 and a sixth on December 1. On September 18, the early colonists convened and established a "voluntary municipal government", and by September 20, the settlers had approved a constitution that included principles of prohibitionatory Maine law to govern their town. The settlement was created against threats by pro-slavery men that the free-staters ought to be "driven from the country". The first rally of forces from Lawrence was the night of September 30, done to protect Thomas J. Ferril, a free-state Methodist preacher from Missouri. His assailants surrounded his house, threatening violence and to destroy his property, but retreated after they saw a body of armed free-staters without injury to either side. The next day, a woman tore down a free-state man's tent. Pro-slavery men rallied to prevent the tent's reconstruction by a group of about 20 armed free-staters, but it was completed without violence. The next day, a sizeable band of pro-slavery men appeared, threatening a repeat of the attack, but upon seeing their opponents ready, they retreated with renewed threats of vengeance.

When the settlers arrived, most had called their fledgling city simply Wakarusa, after the nearby river of the same name, but other names were considered, such as New Boston (in recognition of both the NEEAC's city of operation and the hometown of many early settlers). Meanwhile, settlers from Missouri derisively called it "Yankee Town", due to its New England connections. Another name considered around this time was Lawrence. Many approved of this name in honor of Amos A. Lawrence, an Ipswich-based businessman and noted abolitionist, who, Cordley writes, was "a man of wide personal influence" and "one of the first men of means" to fund the Emigrant Aid Company. Others hoped that if they named their town after him, Lawrence would be inclined to support them with monetary donations, which proved correct. Another factor making "Lawrence" a popular choice was that it had "no bad odor attached to it in any part of the Union". On October 1, the settlement's leaders voted to approve "Lawrence" as the name of their new city, and on October 17, the citizens drew territory lots so as to begin erecting homes and businesses. Around this time, the settlers got into a heated argument with pro-slavery squatters, who were hoping to establish a city named Excelsior on the land where Lawrence was being constructed. These pro-slavers threatened violence against anyone who stood in their way, but eventually acquiesced to the New Englanders, and no open conflict occurred.

In early October 1854, the first governor of the Kansas Territory, Andrew Horatio Reeder, arrived, had a reception and a festival, and after a welcoming speech by Pomeroy, made a conciliatory speech urging harmony and order, while evading the slavery question. Lawrence's first winter was characterized by great hardship, as the people predominantly lived in sod houses and "shanties made of clap-boards". About two miles (3.3 km) south of Lawrence, at the first election on November 29, 1854 to elect Congressional delegates, there was a commotion; it ended with a man named Henry Davis attacking a free-stater man named Lucius Kibbee with an Arkansas toothpick knife. The fight ended when Kibbee shot Davis, making this Kansas's first homicide.

Plymouth Congregational Church in Lawrence was the first church established in Kansas Territory.

By the end of 1854, two newspapers touting the free state mission had been established in the town: the Herald of Freedom, edited by George W. Brown, and the Kansas Pioneer, edited by John Speer, renamed the Kansas Tribune after Speer discovered a proslavery Kansas Pioneer newspaper existed. A third paper, the Kansas Free State, was also created by editors Robert Gaston Elliott and Josiah Miller, and began publication in early January 1855. The Plymouth Congregational Church was started in September 1854 by Reverend S. Y. Lum, a missionary sent to Kansas from Middletown, New York. The first post office in Lawrence was established in January 1855, and E. D. Ladd was appointed the town's first postmaster. On January 10, 1855, the first school in Kansas was established in Lawrence by voluntary contributions, and it was taught by Edward P. Fitch.

=== "Bleeding Kansas" ===
At the start of 1855, settlers who held opposing opinions about slavery settled in the Kansas Territory around the Lawrence area and began to vie for political power. Secret societies, called Blue Lodges, were created, and their sole purpose was to make Kansas a slave state. Their plan was to come into Kansas on the day of the election and vote so as to gain control of the legislature. Before the election, a census determined Kansas had a population of 8,601 with 2,905 of them being voters. Lawrence, specifically, had 369 voters. At the legislature election on March 30, 1855, about 700–1,000 armed pro-slavery men from Missouri voted at the election. They came in over 100 wagons, and they were armed with guns, rifles, pistols, and Bowie knives. They also brought two pieces of artillery. Due to their large numbers, they went unchallenged. They left for Missouri the next morning, having camped in Lawrence the night before. Silas Bond was shot at and driven from the polls on the grounds he was "an obnoxious free-state man". 1,034 votes were cast in Lawrence, 232 of which were legal, with 802 being from non-residents. There were only 2,905 legal voters in the territory, but 6,307 votes were cast. The people appealed to Governor Andrew Reeder to set the election aside, to which he agreed initially, but after being threatened by pro-slavery people, he decided to hold another election in districts in which there were protests, such as Lawrence. The people of Lawrence felt this did nothing, and many were uncertain about what would happen or what they needed to do.

In June 1855, a meeting was held in Lawrence, at which resolutions were adopted intending to resist any laws that may be passed by the legislature, and they declared that the legislature was elected by "armed usurpers from Missouri". This paved the way for a larger convention on June 25. Between June 8 and August 15, 1855, seven meetings were held in Lawrence for the purposes of resisting the legislature. The free-state leaders sent George W. Deitzler to the east to secure weapons from other anti-slavery people. Amos Lawrence and others sent crates full of rifles, to which they labeled "books" because "the border ruffians had no use for books, [and] they came through without being disturbed." With the help of Horace Greeley, a howitzer was sent to Lawrence. On August 27, 1855, the proslavery faction in Douglas County (based primarily out of the territorial capital, Lecompton, as well as smaller satellite settlements like Franklin and Lone Star) got a boost when acting territorial governor Daniel Woodson appointed the zealously proslavery settler Samuel J. Jones to the office of county sheriff. Then, in October 1855, the outspoken abolitionist John Brown arrived in the Kansas Territory; he brought with him a wagon-load of weapons with which he intended to use to fight off "Satan and his legions" (i.e., proslavery settlers).

For much of 1855, the pro- and antislavery factions existed uneasily. Then on November 21, 1855, after an intense verbal altercation, the proslavery settler Franklin N. Coleman shot the Free-Stater Charles Dow in the head, killing him. The murder was the culmination of a long-simmering feud between them, as for some time they had bickered about a land claim near the Hickory Point post office, about 14 miles (23 km) south of Lawrence. According to the Border War Encyclopedia, "Politics had not motivated Coleman to kill Dow, but the murder marked the genesis of the violent political divisions that characterized Kansas for the next 10 years." When Jones investigated the crime, Coleman argued he had acted in self-defense. The sheriff sided with his proslavery compatriot and chose to instead arrest Dow's free state affiliate Jacob Branson for disturbing the peace. Branson was quickly rescued by Samuel Newitt Wood and a gang of Free-Staters by breaking him out of jail. He was rescued at one in the morning, just two hours after the arrest. As the gang of free-staters were heading back, they were unsure of what to do. They consulted with Charles Robinson, and they all realized the pro-slavery people would label this act of breaking someone out of jail as an insurrection. They realized the militia would be called to carry out the arrests of those who broke Branson out of jail, but that they would likely use it as an excuse to destroy Lawrence. The rest of the city was unaware of the rescue at this time. It was decided that the men who broke Branson out of jail would need to keep out of the way. Robinson informed the others at a meeting of citizens that morning, to which they agreed. They then started preparing the city for defense.

=== Sacking ===
To calm the increasingly belligerent settlers, the governor of the Kansas Territory, Wilson Shannon, called on the Kansas militia to intervene. Shannon had intended for the militia to be composed of Kansans, but Jones mustered a small army of 1,200–1,500 proslavery men, all but about 50 of them from Missouri. When the citizens of Lawrence learned of Jones's army, they raised up a defensive militia of 600–800 men armed with "Beecher's Bibles". Robinson was chosen to direct the city's military operations, the future state senator James Lane was selected as his second-in-command, and a "committee of safety" was also created, which organized squads of about 20 men to keep watch over the city. Lawrence was additionally aided by John Brown and his four sons: John Jr., Oliver, Owen, and Watson. Five forts of earthwork or rifle pits were constructed, and a solid defense was prepared. While both sides were ready for a fight, an outright clash between the two militias was prevented at least in part by the harsh Kansas winter. On December 8, Shannon had had enough and ordered representatives from both sides to meet at the proslavery stronghold of Franklin to sign a peace treaty. Terms were agreed to, and eventually, after much persuading, the Missouri army reluctantly left the area. This conflict, despite its rather diminutive size and scale, would later be known as the "Wakarusa War".

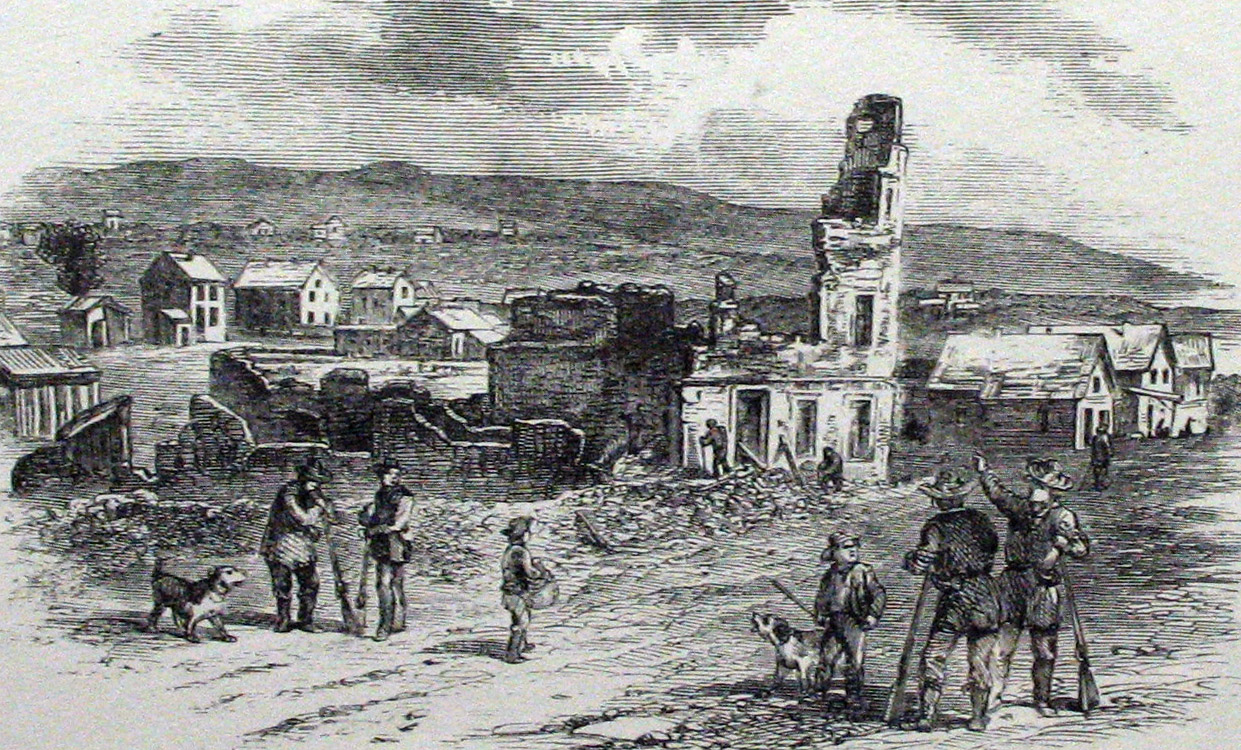
Ruins of Free State Hotel after the 1856 Sacking of Lawrence

In the spring of 1856, the proslavery forces, hoping to diminish the power of the anti-slavery settlers, singled out the Kansas Free State, the Herald of Freedom, and the Free State Hotel (the latter of which the NEEAC owned and operated) as "nuisances" that needed to be stopped. On April 23, 1856, Sheriff Jones entered Lawrence and attempted to arrest about a dozen members of the extralegal Free-State legislature (a rogue governing body set up in opposition to the official proslavery territorial government). During the commotion, Jones was non-fatally shot by a sniper named Charles Lenhart, and Lawrence residents promptly drove the sheriff out of town. The people of Lawrence disavowed the act, and they offered a $500 bounty for the sniper's arrest.

A few weeks later, on May 11, Federal Marshal Israel B. Donaldson proclaimed the act had interfered with the legal execution of warrants against select antislavery settlers. This proclamation was bolstered by a Kansas grand jury's presentment that "the building known as the 'Free State' Hotel' [sic] in Lawrence had been constructed with a view to military occupation and defence, regularly parapetted and port holed, for the use of cannon and small arms, thereby endangering the public safety, and encouraging rebellion and sedition in this country". Donaldson, Jones, and Missouri senator David Rice Atchison consequently raised another army of around 800 Southerners. Ostensibly this army's purpose was to enforce the legal arrest warrants, but the group was also motivated by a desire to stamp out the Free-Stater nest that was Lawrence.

On May 21, Donaldson and Jones rode into town and arrested those who had evaded them. While the citizens of Lawrence hoped the officers would leave peacefully, this did not come to pass. Donaldson dismissed his men, who Jones immediately deputized. The sheriff was then joined by more followers and together they began to sack the city. After seizing the house of Charles Robinson (who had recently been arrested in Missouri, and was held in prison near Lecompton on grounds of treason) to serve as his headquarters, Jones and his men attacked the offices of the antislavery newspapers. The attackers smashed the presses, tossed the type into the nearby Kansas River, and threw printed copies of the newspapers into the wind. Afterward, the proslavery mob shot the Free State Hotel with a cannon and burnt it down. Jones and his men then pillaged $30,000 worth of valuables. When Jones left the city, he and his men lit Robinson's house on fire for good measure.

Although the city was thoroughly ransacked, the human cost of the attack was low: only one person—a member of Jones's posses—died during the attack when he was struck by a piece of falling masonry. In late September 1856, another sack seemed nigh when, according to the Kansas State Board of Agriculture 1878 Biennial Report, "2,700 proslavery men appeared in sight of Lawrence, and the city was temporarily defended by Free-State men, under the command of Maj. J. B. Abbott". However, this threat was neutralized when the recently installed territorial governor John W. Geary realized what was about to happen and called for federal reinforcements to defend the city.

=== Anti-slavery capital ===
In both 1855 and 1857, Lawrence received a charter from the proslavery government in Lecompton, but the citizens, being adamant in their opposition to the "Bogus Legislature", refused to accept it, as it would have organized Lawrence under proslavery laws. In July 1857, the citizens of Lawrence then attempted to secure an "official" city charter from the extralegal Free-State legislature before issuing one themselves. This act was seen as one of bold-faced insurrection by the newly-installed territorial governor Robert J. Walker; as a result, on July 15, 1857, Walker ordered William S. Harney to send a regiment of soldiers to watch over the city and impose martial law. These troops remained in the vicinity of Lawrence until the territorial elections in October of that year. By this time, it seemed as if the struggles of Lawrence's early citizens were coming to fruition. In the election of 1857, free-staters gained the upper hand and were able to oust the proslavery majority from the territorial legislature. By the start of the next year, Samuel Jones—long the enemy of Lawrence's free state population—resigned his post as sheriff and left the territory. On January 16, 1858, Lawrence was declared the seat of Douglas County (an honor that previously belonged to Lecompton), and in February, the legislature approved the city charter that had been drafted a little less than a year prior in July. James Blood was then elected the first mayor of the city. Around this time, the antislavery legislature often met in Lawrence, which functioned as the de facto capital of Kansas Territory from 1858 until 1861 (although Lecompton was still the de jure seat of the governing body).

=== Kansas statehood and the American Civil War ===
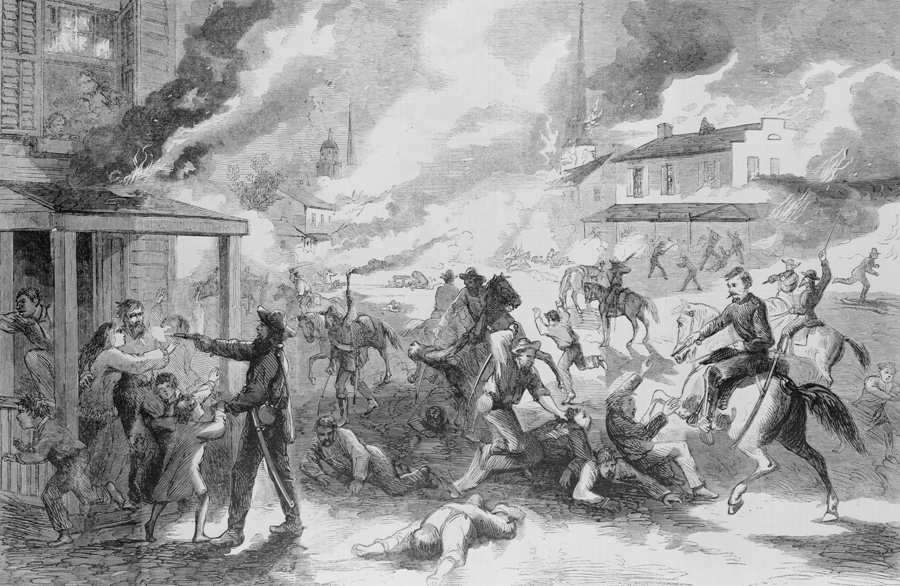
Lawrence during the Lawrence Massacre, as illustrated in Harper's Weekly

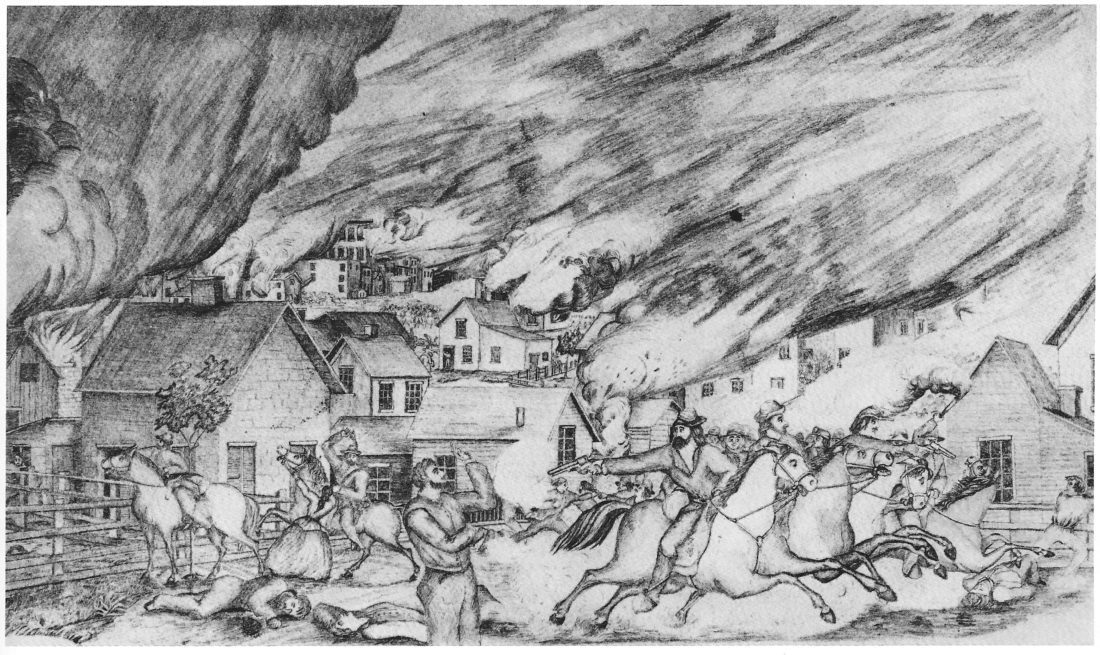
Eyewitness Sherman Enderton's sketch of Quantrill's attack on Lawrence

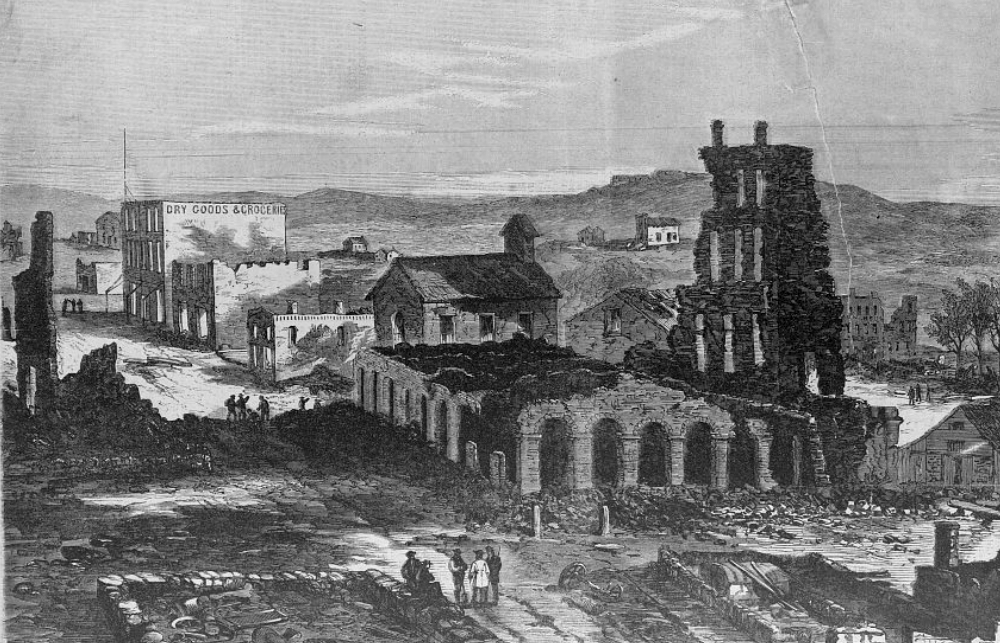
Lawrence in ruins, following the Lawrence Massacre, as illustrated in Harper's Weekly. The ruins of the Eldridge House are in the foreground.

On October 4, 1859, the Wyandotte Constitution was approved in a referendum by a vote of 10,421 to 5,530, and after its approval by the U.S. Congress, Kansas was admitted as a free state on January 29, 1861. By the time the Wyandotte Constitution was framed in 1859, it was clear the proslavery forces had lost in their bid to control Kansas. But while Kansas's entrance into the Union as a free state arguably ended the Bleeding Kansas period, it coincided with the outbreak of the American Civil War. Kansas's admission as a free state immediately followed the departure of the seceding states' pro-slavery congressmen, who until then had blocked it.

During the war, Lawrence became a stronghold for Jayhawker guerilla units (also known as "Red Legs"), led by James Lane, James Montgomery, and "Doc" Jennison, among others. These groups raided parts of western Missouri, stealing goods and burning down farms; it was a common belief by Southerners that the goods snatched by these Jayhawkers were stored in Lawrence. On August 21, 1863, Lawrence was attacked and destroyed by William Quantrill and hundreds of his irregular Confederate raiders. Most houses and businesses in Lawrence were burned and between 150 and 200 men and boys were murdered, leaving 80 widows and 250 orphans. About $2,000,000 worth of property (equivalent to $52,297,297 in 2025) was destroyed. The Plymouth Congregational Church in Lawrence survived the attack, but a number of its members were killed and its records were destroyed.

Following the Lawrence Massacre, the survivors and their Unionist allies began to clean up the damage and restore their settlement. After a very bitter winter that forced the citizens to temporarily put their work on hold, rebuilding continued into 1864, and was completed with a zeal that Richard Cordley described as akin to "a religious obligation". Given the trauma of 1863, the citizens of Lawrence were on edge during this period of rebuilding; Cordley notes, "Rumors [of guerrilla attacks] were thick and the people [of Lawrence] were particularly sensitive to them." Consequently, Lawrence citizens organized themselves into companies to protect the city. Around this time, the federal government also erected several military posts on Mount Oread (among them Camp Ewing, Camp Lookout, and Fort Ulysses) to keep guard over the city. However, no further attacks were made on Lawrence, and these installations were eventually abandoned and dismantled after the war.

=== Post-Civil War ===
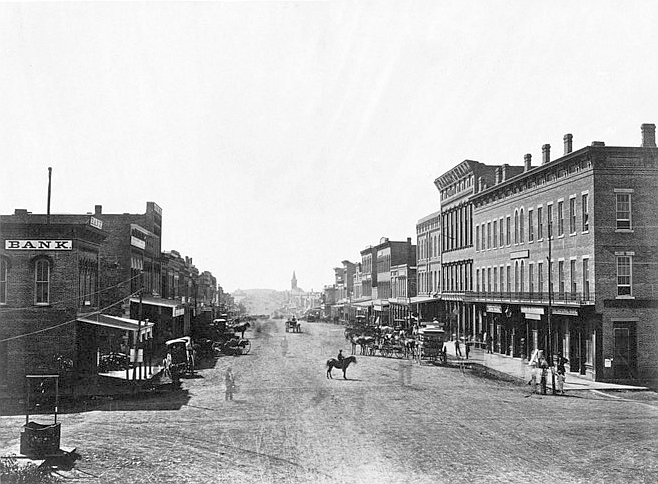
Massachusetts Avenue, c. 1867

Attempts to begin a university in Kansas were first undertaken in 1855, but it was only after Kansas became a state in 1861 that those attempts saw any real fruition. An institute of learning was proposed in 1859 as The University of Lawrence, but it never opened. When Kansas became a state, provision was included in the Kansas Constitution for a state university. From 1861 to 1863 the question of where the university would be located—Lawrence, Manhattan or Emporia—was debated. On January 13, 1863, Manhattan was made the site of the state's land-grant college, leaving only Lawrence and Emporia as candidates. The fact Lawrence had $10,000 plus interest donated by Amos Lawrence plus 40 acres (160,000 m^{2}) to donate for the university had great weight with the legislature. Eventually, Lawrence beat out Emporia by one vote, and in 1866, the University of Kansas (KU) was opened to students.

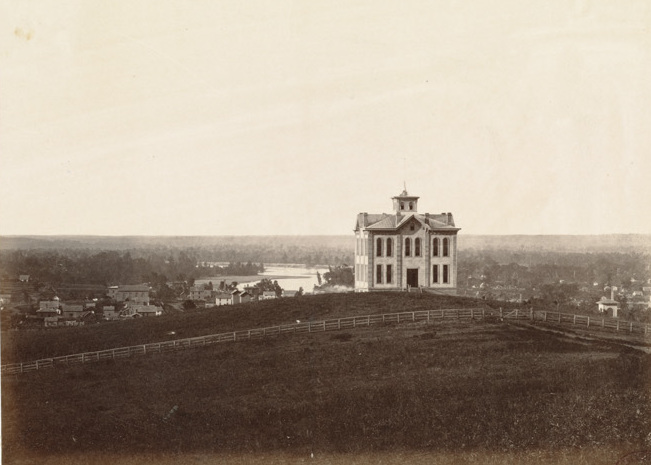
Old North College, the first building on KU Campus, overlooking Lawrence and the Kansas River, c. 1867

The first railroad that connected Lawrence was built in 1864, starting from Kansas City. It was surveyed by the Union Pacific Railway, Eastern Division, and the first train to Lawrence traveled on November 28, 1864. The first train to operate in Kansas south of the Kansas River did so by crossing the river in Lawrence on November 1, 1867.

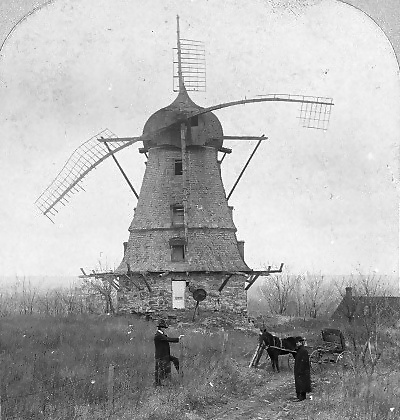
The wind-powered mill two years before its destruction, c. 1903

Facing an energy crisis in the early 1870s, the city contracted with Orlando Darling to construct a dam across the Kansas River to help provide the city with power. After an ice jam broke loose and destroyed part of the incomplete dam in the winter of 1873, Darling resigned and left Lawrence shortly thereafter. The Lawrence Land & Water Company completed the dam anyway later that year, but damage to the dam from seasonal floods continued to plague the company, which went into receivership in 1878, after which it was purchased by James H. Gower and his son-in-law, Justin DeWitt Bowersock. Only after Bowersock assumed responsibility for dam repairs in 1879 did regular damage to the dam cease. The Bowersock Dam, which remains the only hydropower dam in the state of Kansas, helped Lawrence establish itself as an industrial city. The dam closed in 1968 but was reopened in 1977 with help from the city, which wanted to build a new city hall next to the Bowersock Plant.

The first wind-powered mill in Kansas was built in Lawrence in 1863 near the corner of what is now 9th Street and Emery Road. It was partially destroyed during Quantrill's Raid, but it was rebuilt in 1864 at a cost of $9,700. It continued to be operational until July 1885, but on April 30, 1905, it was destroyed in a fire.

In 1884 the United States Indian Industrial Training School was opened in Lawrence, a Native American Boarding School with the goal of assimilation. Boys were taught the trades of tailor making, blacksmithing, farming and others while girls were taught cooking and homemaking. Most food was produced on site at the Haskell Farm and students were expected to work in addition to their training. In 1885, the school expanded to include academic training and a commercial department with five typewriters opened, starting the first touch-typing class in Kansas. In 1887 the name was changed to the Haskell Institute, after Dudley Haskell, a legislator responsible for the school being in Lawrence. In 1993 the name was changed again to Haskell Indian Nations University.

=== 20th century and beyond ===
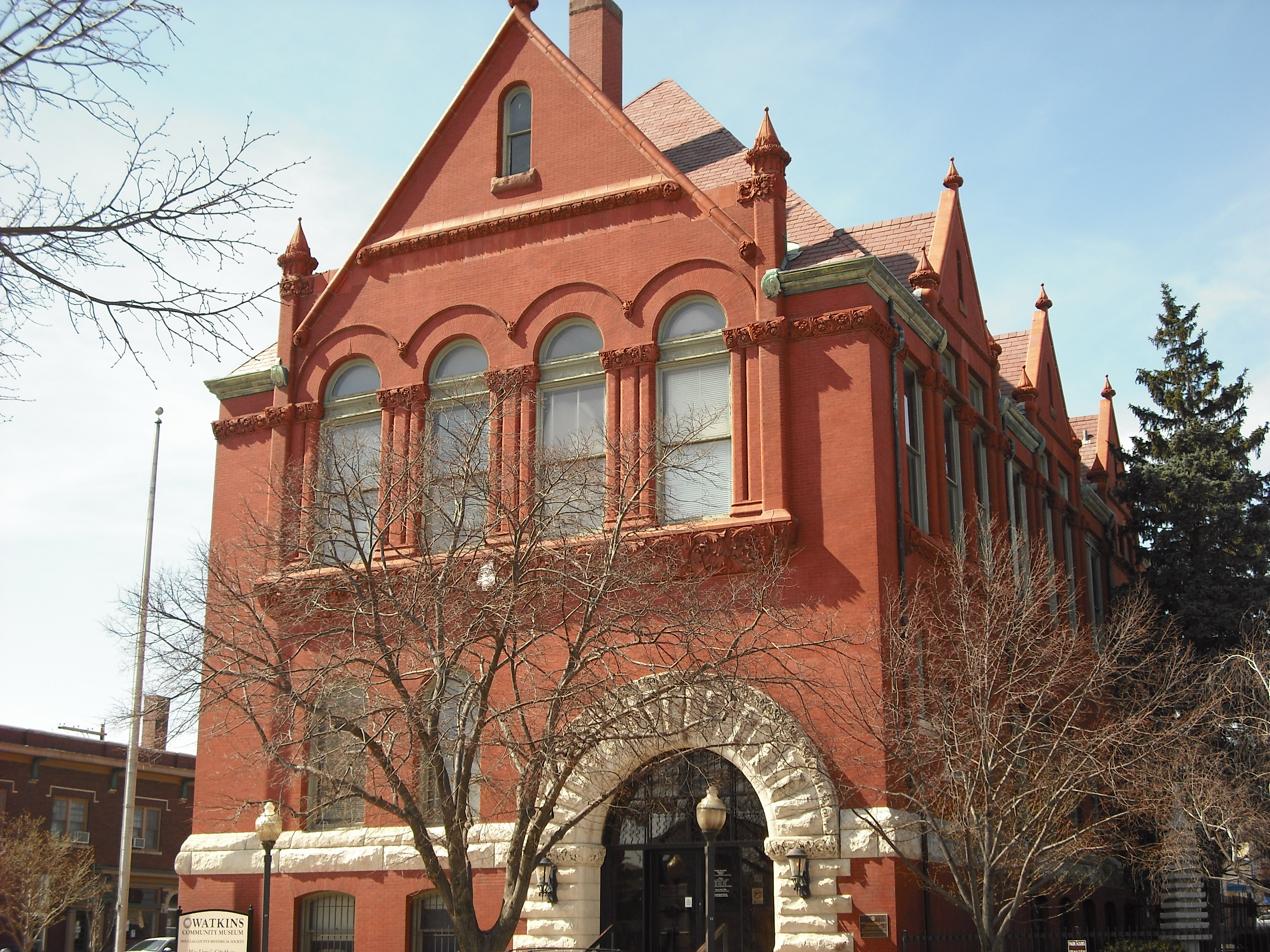
Watkins Community Museum, once Watkins National Bank and Lawrence City Hall (2008)

In 1888, Watkins National Bank opened at 11th and Massachusetts. Founded by Jabez B. Watkins, the bank would last until 1929. Watkin's widow Elizabeth, a philanthropist who also funded buildings for the University of Kansas and two local hospitals, donated the bank building to the city to use as a city hall. In 1970, the city built a new city hall and after extensive renovations, the bank reopened in 1975 as the Elizabeth M. Watkins Community Museum.

In 1903, the Kansas River flooded causing property damage in Lawrence, especially North Lawrence. The water got as high as 27 feet and water marks can still be seen on some buildings especially at TeePee Junction at the U.S. 24–40 intersection and at Burcham Park. Lawrence would be hit by other floods in 1951, where the water rose over 30 feet (9.1 m), and in 1993 but with the reservoir and levee system in place, Lawrence only had minimal damage compared to the other floods.

Also in 1903, Theodore Roosevelt visited Lawrence on his way to Manhattan where he gave a short speech and dedicated a fountain at 9th & New Hampshire. The fountain was later moved to South Park next to the gazebo. Roosevelt would visit Lawrence again in 1910 after visiting Osawatomie where he dedicated the John Brown State Historical Site and gave a speech on New Nationalism.

In 1871, the Lawrence Street Railway Company opened and offered citizens easy access to hotels and businesses along Massachusetts Street. The first streetcar was pulled by horses and mules and the track just ran along Massachusetts Street. After the 1903 flood, the Kansas River bridge had to be rebuilt but was not considered safe for a streetcar to pass over. The Lawrence Street Railway Company closed later that year. In 1907, C.L. Rutter attempted to bring back a bus system, after having failed in 1902. In 1909, a new streetcar system was implemented putting Rutter out of business and lasting until 1935. In 1909, the streetcar company created Casey's Coaster (also known as Daisy's Dozer), a wooden roller coaster which lasted from 1909 to the 1920s, in Woodland Park.

In 1921, Lawrence Memorial Hospital opened in the 300 block of Maine Street. It started with only 50 beds but by 1980, the hospital would expand to 200.

In 1927, high school classes were offered at Haskell Institute. Haskell's Athletics were well-known; they were known as the "Powerhouse of the West" with victories over Oklahoma A&M, Kansas State, Texas, and Nebraska. The Olympian Jim Thorpe graduated from the program. The last high school class graduated in 1965, the school was transitioning to post-high school education. In 1970, the school became known as Haskell Indian Junior College, and in 1993, Haskell Indian Nations University.

In 1929 Lawrence began celebrating its 75th anniversary. The city dedicated Founder's Rock, commonly referred to as the Shunganunga Boulder, a huge red boulder brought to Lawrence from near Tecumseh, Kansas. The rock honors the two parties of the Emigrant Aid Society who first settled in Lawrence. Lawrence also dedicated the Lawrence Municipal Airport on October 14.

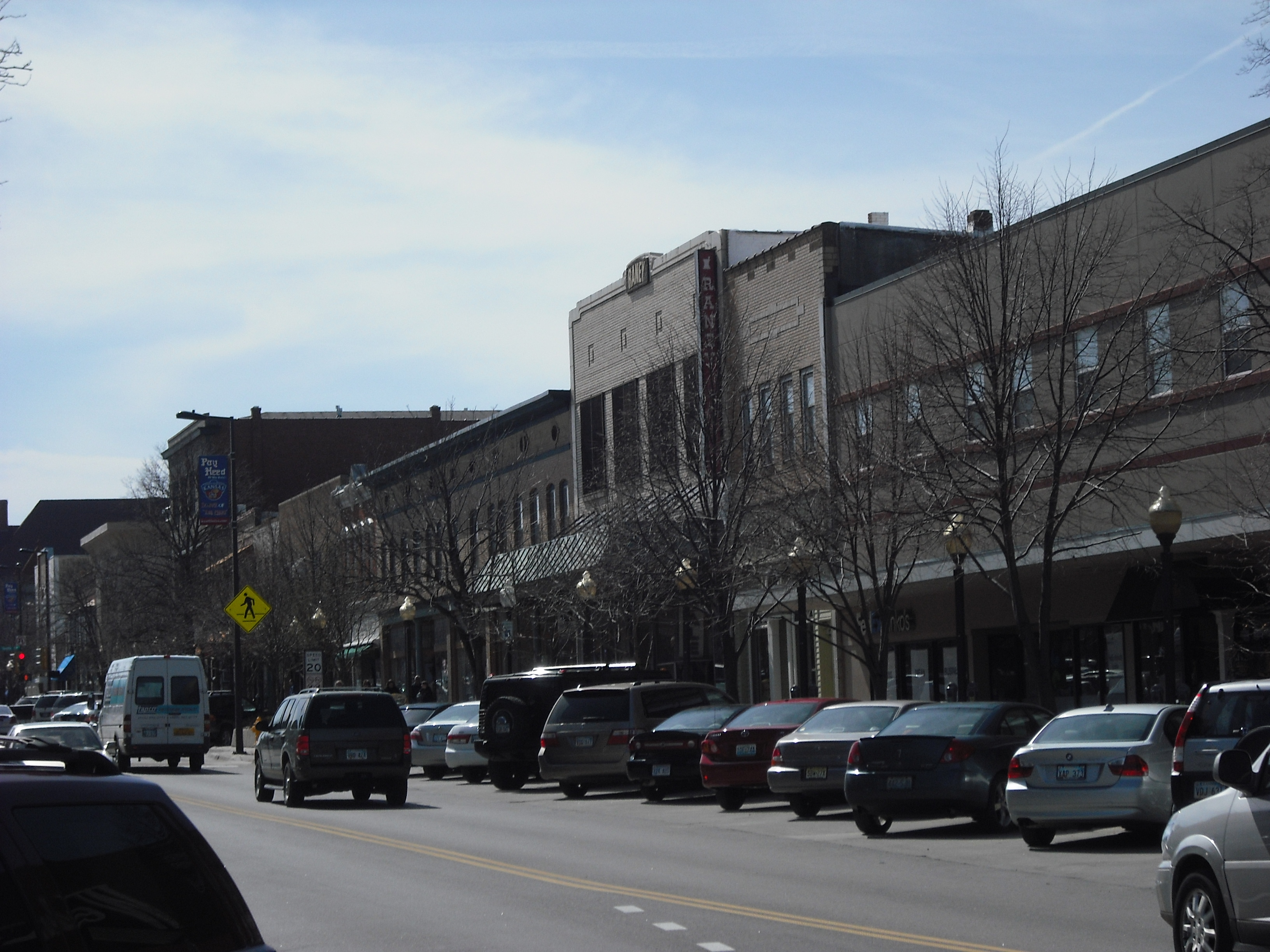
The 900 block of Massachusetts Street (2008)

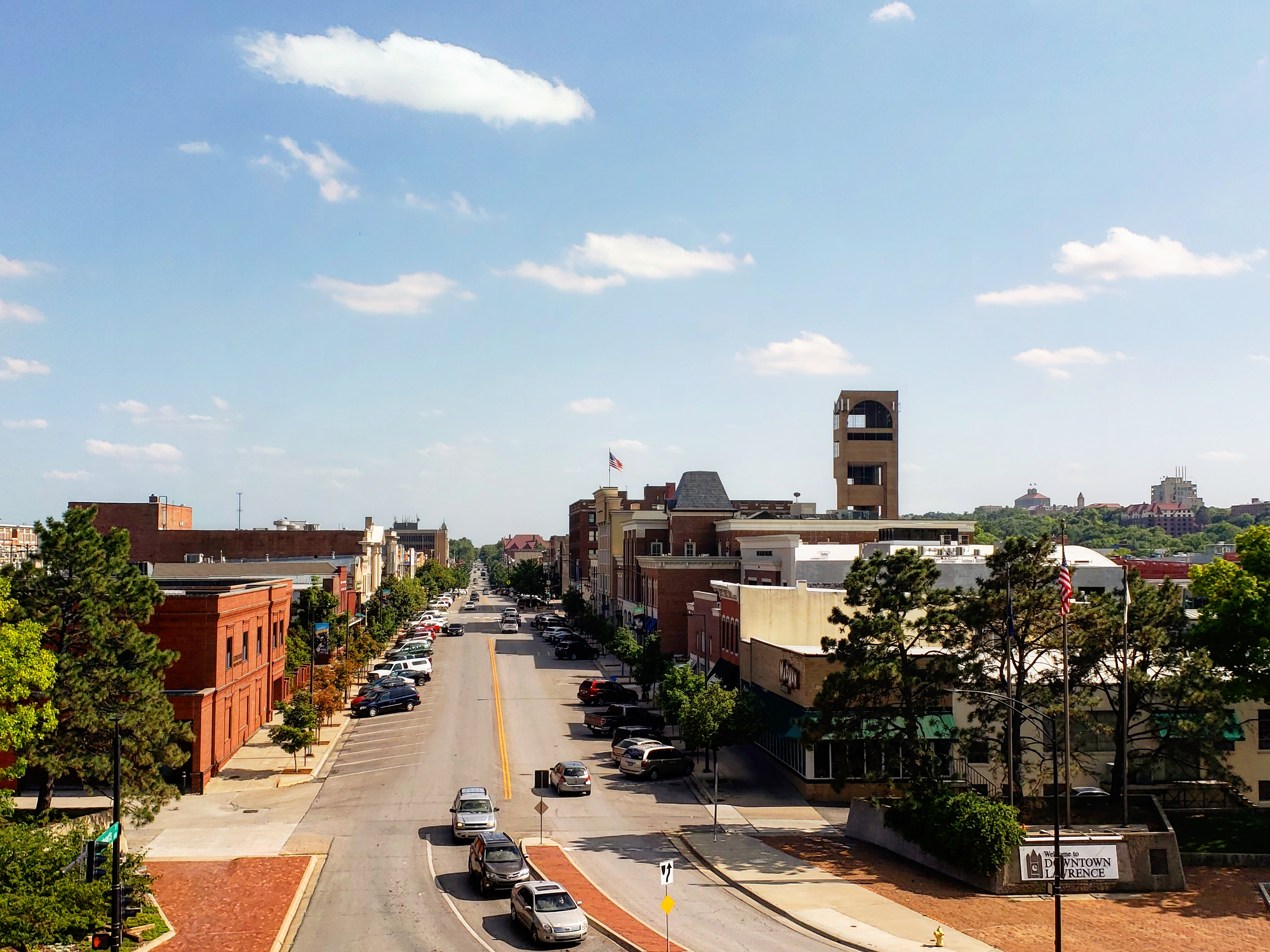
Downtown Lawrence looking south. The University of Kansas is visible in the upper right on the hill (2018)

In 1943, the federal government transported German and Italian prisoners of World War II to Kansas and other Midwest states to work on farms and help solve the labor shortage caused by American men serving in the war effort. Large internment camps were established in Kansas: Camp Concordia, Camp Funston (at Fort Riley), Camp Phillips (at Salina under Fort Riley). Fort Riley established 12 smaller branch camps, including Lawrence. The camp in Lawrence was near 11th & Haskell Avenue near the railroad tracks. The camp would close by the end of 1945.

In 1947, Gilbert Francis and his son George opened Francis Sporting Goods downtown, selling mostly fishing and hunting gear. In November 2014, Francis Sporting Goods, announced its retail business within what had become Lawrence's Downtown Historic District would close by the end of the year, allowing the Francis family to focus on supplying uniforms and equipment to teams.

In the early 1980s, Lawrence grabbed attention from the television movie The Day After. The TV movie first appeared on ABC but was later shown in movie theaters around the world. The movie depicted what would happen if the United States were destroyed in a nuclear war. The movie was filmed in Lawrence, and hundreds of local residents appeared in the film as extras and in speaking roles.

In 2020, a report commissioned by the Lawrence City Council concluded the city needed to promote a vital expansion or risk turning into an unaffordable albatross, saying "If Lawrence doesn't attract more kinds of businesses, it could become a bedroom community that's not affordable for people who don't commute elsewhere."

== Geography ==
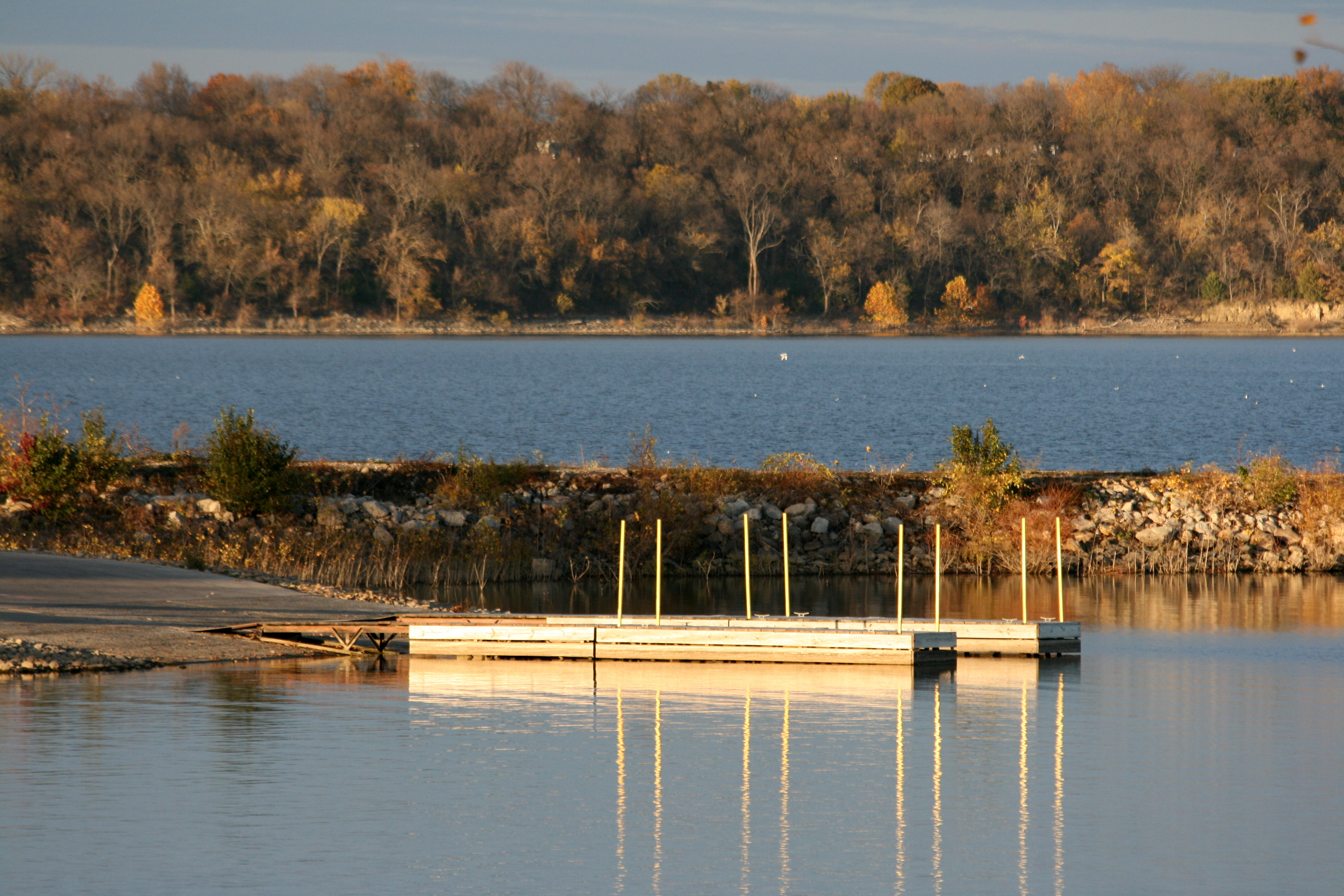
Clinton Lake, which lies to the southwest of the city (2015)

Lawrence is located approximately 25 miles (40 kilometers) east of Topeka, and 35 mi (56 km) west of Kansas City, Kansas. Though Lawrence has a designated elevation of 866 feet (264 m), the highest elevation is Mount Oread on the University of Kansas campus with an elevation of 1,020 feet (310 m).

The city lies on the southern edge of the Dissected Till Plains, bordering the Osage Plains to the south. According to the United States Census Bureau, the city has a total area of 34.26 square miles (88.73 km^{2}), of which, 33.56 square miles (86.92 km^{2}) is land and 0.70 square miles (1.81 km^{2}) is water, and is split between Wakarusa Township and Grant Township with small portions in Lecompton, Kanwaka and Clinton Townships.

Lawrence is between the Kansas and Wakarusa Rivers. Several major creeks flow through Lawrence. Burroughs Creek in East Lawrence (named after the writer William S. Burroughs, who retired in East Lawrence) and Baldwin Creek in northwestern Lawrence empty into the Kansas River. Yankee Tank Creek in southwest Lawrence and an unnamed creek that flows through central Lawrence converge with the Wakarusa River south of the city. Yankee Tank Creek is dammed to form Lake Alvamar, which was originally called Yankee Tank Lake. The Wakarusa River was dammed to form Clinton Lake. Potter Lake is on the University of Kansas Campus and Mary's Lake is in southeastern Lawrence within Prairie Park. The Haskell-Baker Wetlands, maintained by Haskell University and Baker University, is an extensive open space in the southern part of the city that features wetlands, native plants, hiking and biking trails, and interpretative signage about the prairie and wetland ecosystems.

Lawrence has 54 parks which include community and neighborhood parks, trails, cemeteries and nature preserves. A new, multi-use trail system called the Lawrence Loop ("the Loop") encircles the city and, when fully completed, will create a 22-mile paved recreational trail, a green transportation network, and multiple opportunities for environmental restoration. Community parks include South Park, Buford Watson Park, Broken Arrow Park, Riverfront Park, Holcomb Park, "Dad" Perry Park, Centennial Park and Prairie Park. Cemeteries include Oak Hill, Maple Grove and Memorial Park. The first cemetery in Lawrence, Pioneer Cemetery, is on the University of Kansas campus and is maintained by KU.

=== Climate ===
Lawrence has a humid continental climate (Köppen Dfa), typically experiencing hot, humid summers and cold, dry winters. The hottest temperature recorded in Lawrence was 114 °F (45.6 °C) on August 10, 1934, and August 14, 1936, while the coldest temperature recorded was −25 °F (−31.7 °C) on February 12, 1899.

Climate data for Lawrence, Kansas, 1991–2020 normals, extremes 1868–present
Month	Jan	Feb	Mar	Apr	May	Jun	Jul	Aug	Sep	Oct	Nov	Dec	Year
Record high °F (°C)	74 (23)	84 (29)	94 (34)	94 (34)	102 (39)	107 (42)	113 (45)	114 (46)	108 (42)	98 (37)	85 (29)	76 (24)	114 (46)
Mean maximum °F (°C)	61.9 (16.6)	67.0 (19.4)	78.1 (25.6)	83.9 (28.8)	88.8 (31.6)	94.7 (34.8)	99.3 (37.4)	99.4 (37.4)	93.0 (33.9)	86.1 (30.1)	73.5 (23.1)	64.3 (17.9)	101.3 (38.5)
Mean daily maximum °F (°C)	38.3 (3.5)	43.6 (6.4)	54.6 (12.6)	64.6 (18.1)	74.1 (23.4)	83.9 (28.8)	88.6 (31.4)	87.3 (30.7)	79.0 (26.1)	67.0 (19.4)	53.5 (11.9)	41.8 (5.4)	64.7 (18.1)
Daily mean °F (°C)	28.8 (−1.8)	33.3 (0.7)	43.9 (6.6)	54.3 (12.4)	65.0 (18.3)	74.6 (23.7)	79.2 (26.2)	77.5 (25.3)	68.9 (20.5)	56.8 (13.8)	43.7 (6.5)	33.0 (0.6)	54.9 (12.7)
Mean daily minimum °F (°C)	19.4 (−7.0)	23.0 (−5.0)	33.1 (0.6)	43.9 (6.6)	55.9 (13.3)	65.3 (18.5)	69.8 (21.0)	67.6 (19.8)	58.7 (14.8)	46.6 (8.1)	33.9 (1.1)	24.2 (−4.3)	45.1 (7.3)
Mean minimum °F (°C)	0.2 (−17.7)	6.0 (−14.4)	15.3 (−9.3)	29.0 (−1.7)	42.2 (5.7)	53.6 (12.0)	59.9 (15.5)	58.0 (14.4)	44.2 (6.8)	30.0 (−1.1)	17.2 (−8.2)	7.1 (−13.8)	−3.6 (−19.8)
Record low °F (°C)	−21 (−29)	−25 (−32)	−7 (−22)	11 (−12)	30 (−1)	37 (3)	47 (8)	42 (6)	24 (−4)	15 (−9)	2 (−17)	−21 (−29)	−25 (−32)
Average precipitation inches (mm)	0.96 (24)	1.54 (39)	2.32 (59)	4.13 (105)	5.13 (130)	5.69 (145)	4.28 (109)	4.63 (118)	3.95 (100)	3.20 (81)	1.96 (50)	1.61 (41)	39.40 (1,001)
Average snowfall inches (cm)	2.1 (5.3)	3.3 (8.4)	0.8 (2.0)	0.1 (0.25)	0.0 (0.0)	0.0 (0.0)	0.0 (0.0)	0.0 (0.0)	0.0 (0.0)	0.3 (0.76)	0.9 (2.3)	2.9 (7.4)	10.4 (26.41)
Average precipitation days (≥ 0.01 in)	4.7	5.6	7.7	9.5	11.3	9.5	8.2	8.2	7.3	7.3	5.4	4.9	89.6
Average snowy days (≥ 0.1 in)	2.2	1.7	0.5	0.2	0.0	0.0	0.0	0.0	0.0	0.2	0.6	1.8	7.2
Source 1: NOAA
Source 2: National Weather Service

== Cityscape ==
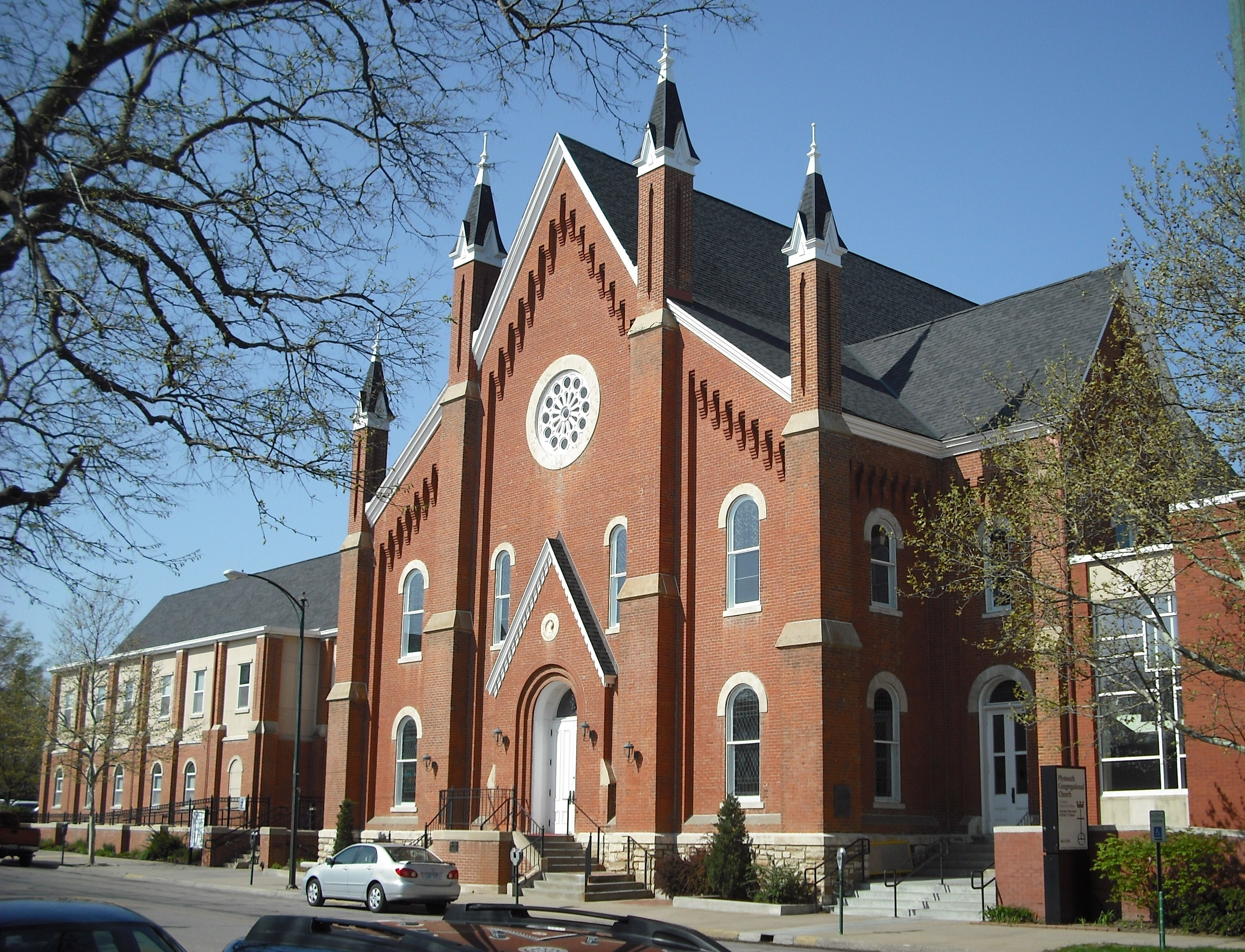
Plymouth Church in Lawrence

=== Streets ===
The early settlers of the town named the city's main road "Massachusetts" to commemorate the New England Emigrant Aid Company's home state. As laid out on the first map of Lawrence, the north–south streets to the east of Massachusetts Street were named for the original thirteen colonies running from the geographic south to the north, with only Massachusetts and New Hampshire streets out of order (guaranteeing Massachusetts Street the honor of the central business corridor), while those streets west of Massachusetts Street were named for states in order of admittance to the Union. East–west streets were named after "men who had done something in the sacred cause of liberty". Over the years, however, this plan became marred. A number of streets were placed in the wrong order, North and South Carolina were consolidated into a single Carolina Street near Lawrence High School, and the names of nine states (Alaska, Georgia, Hawaii, Idaho, Nevada, New Mexico, Texas, Washington and Wyoming) were never given to streets. The state street naming system was abandoned after the establishment of Iowa Street, which runs through the center of Lawrence. In 1913, the east–west streets were renamed to numbered streets.

=== Neighborhoods ===
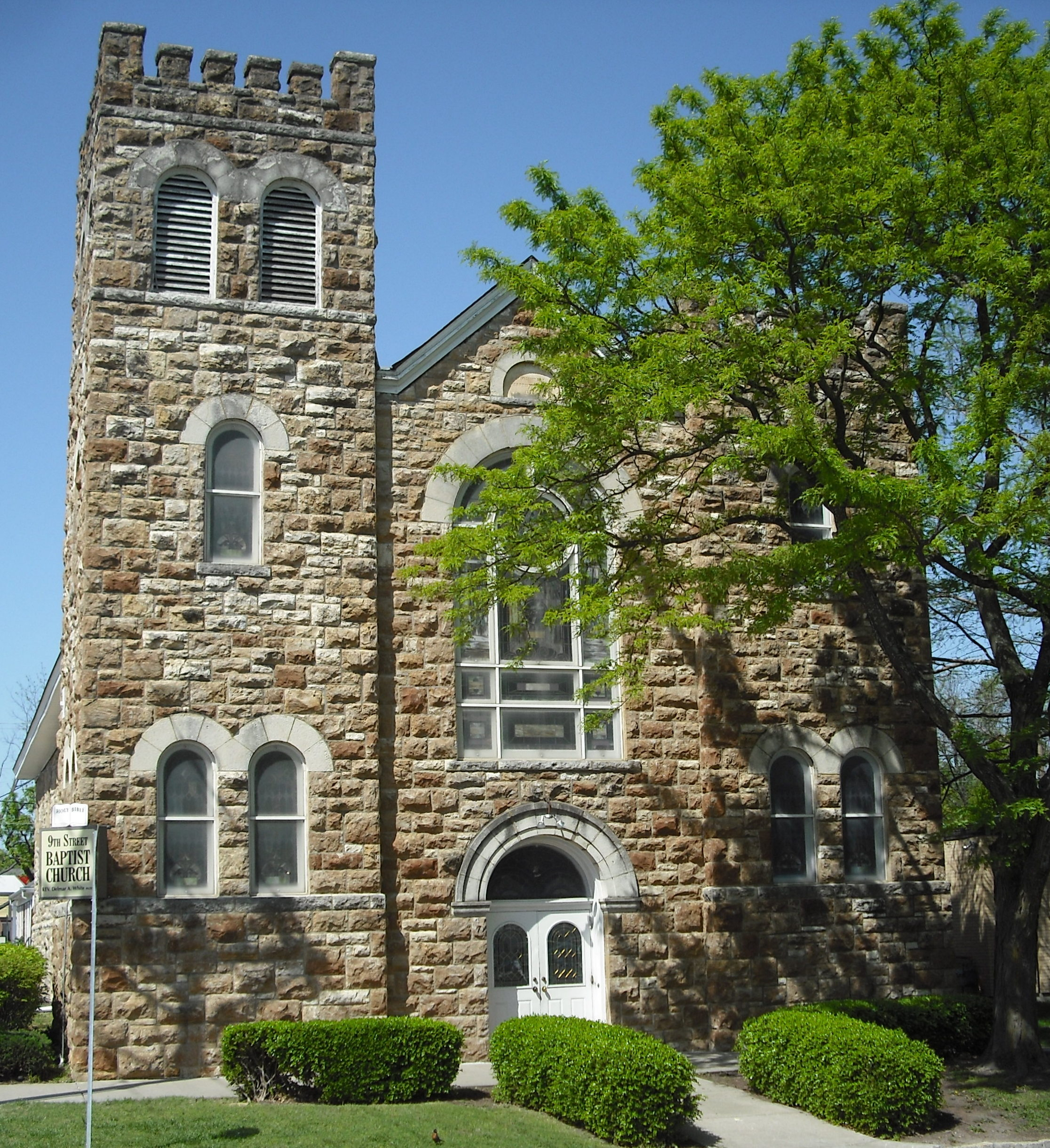
The Ninth Street Baptist Church in Old West Lawrence

Lawrence is designated by neighborhoods. Neighborhoods closest to downtown are Old West Lawrence, North Lawrence, East Lawrence, Oread, Hancock and Pinkney. The neighborhoods west of Iowa Street are Sunset Hills, Prairie Meadows, Deerfield, and Alvamar. There are several neighborhoods listed on the National Register of Historic Places: Old West Lawrence, Oread, Hancock, Breezedale, and most of Rhode Island Street in East Lawrence.

==== North Lawrence ====
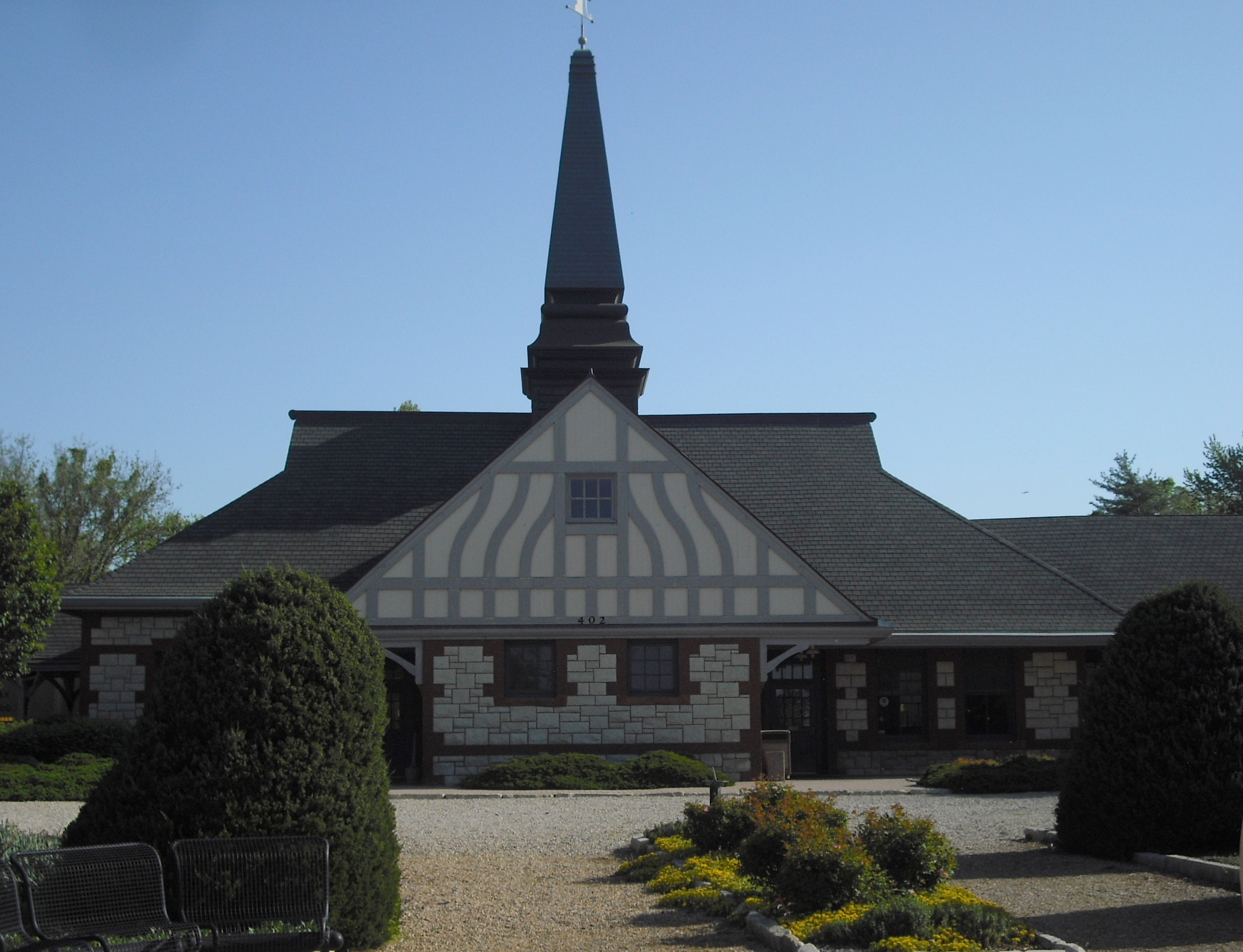
The Lawrence Visitors Center, formerly the Union Pacific Depot

Grant Township, north of the Kansas River, was annexed to Douglas County in 1870 from southern Sarcoxie Township in Jefferson County. The largest city in the township was Jefferson, founded in 1866 just over the river from Lawrence. Jefferson was renamed North Lawrence in 1869 and it was attempted to annex the town to Lawrence proper but the motion failed. The following year, the State Legislature annexed the town.

Just northeast of North Lawrence there once was a popular park area known as Bismarck Grove. During the late 19th century, this area housed numerous fairs, picnics, and temperance meetings. In 1870, the Kansas Pacific railroad set up a number of manufacturing and repair shops in this area, which became known as "Bismarck". The first organized gathering in the area took place in 1878 was the National Temperance camp meeting. The last fair was held at the Grove in 1899, and due to financial issues, the area was sold and became private property in 1900.

=== Architecture ===
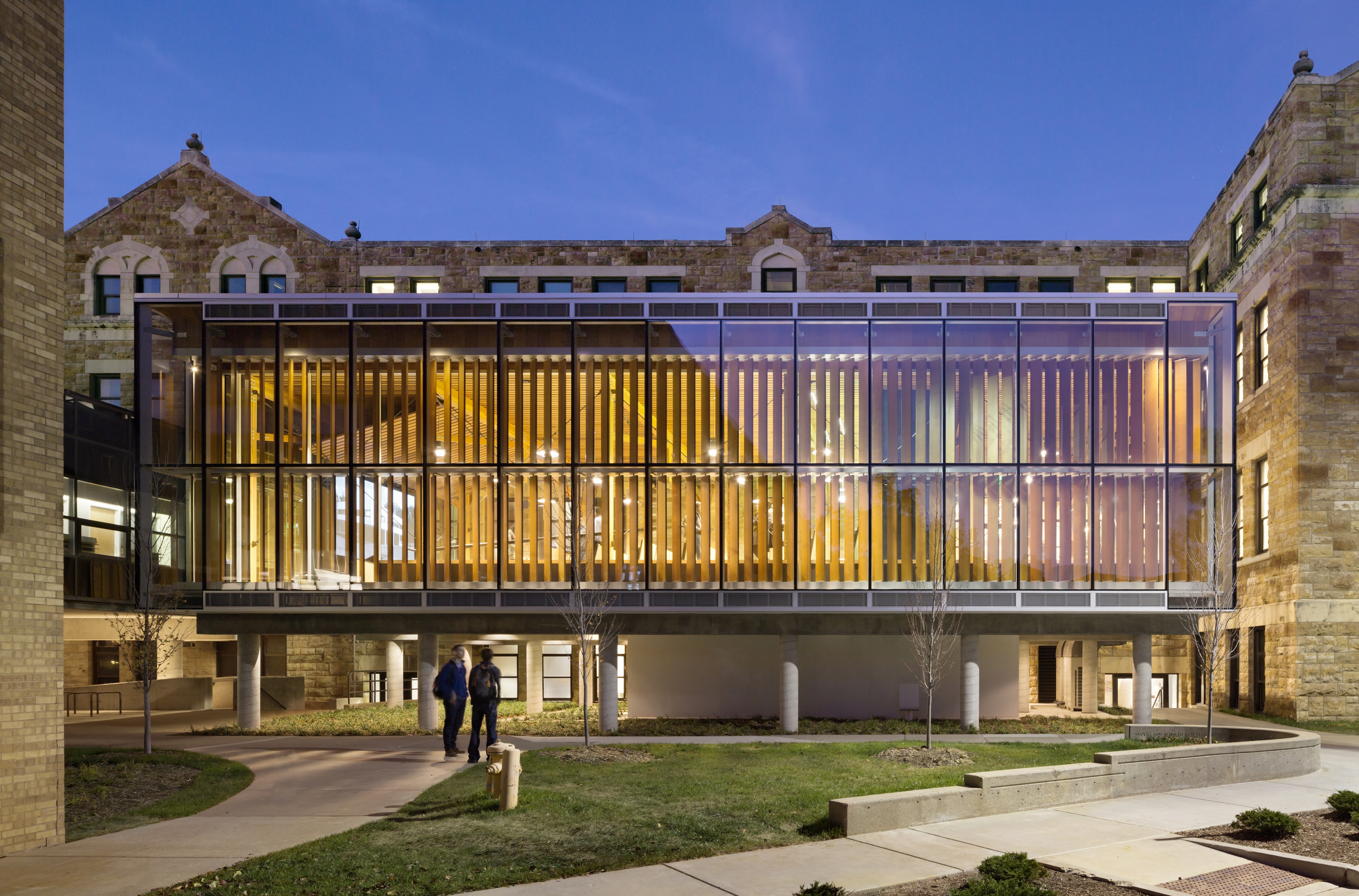
The Forum at Marvin Hall

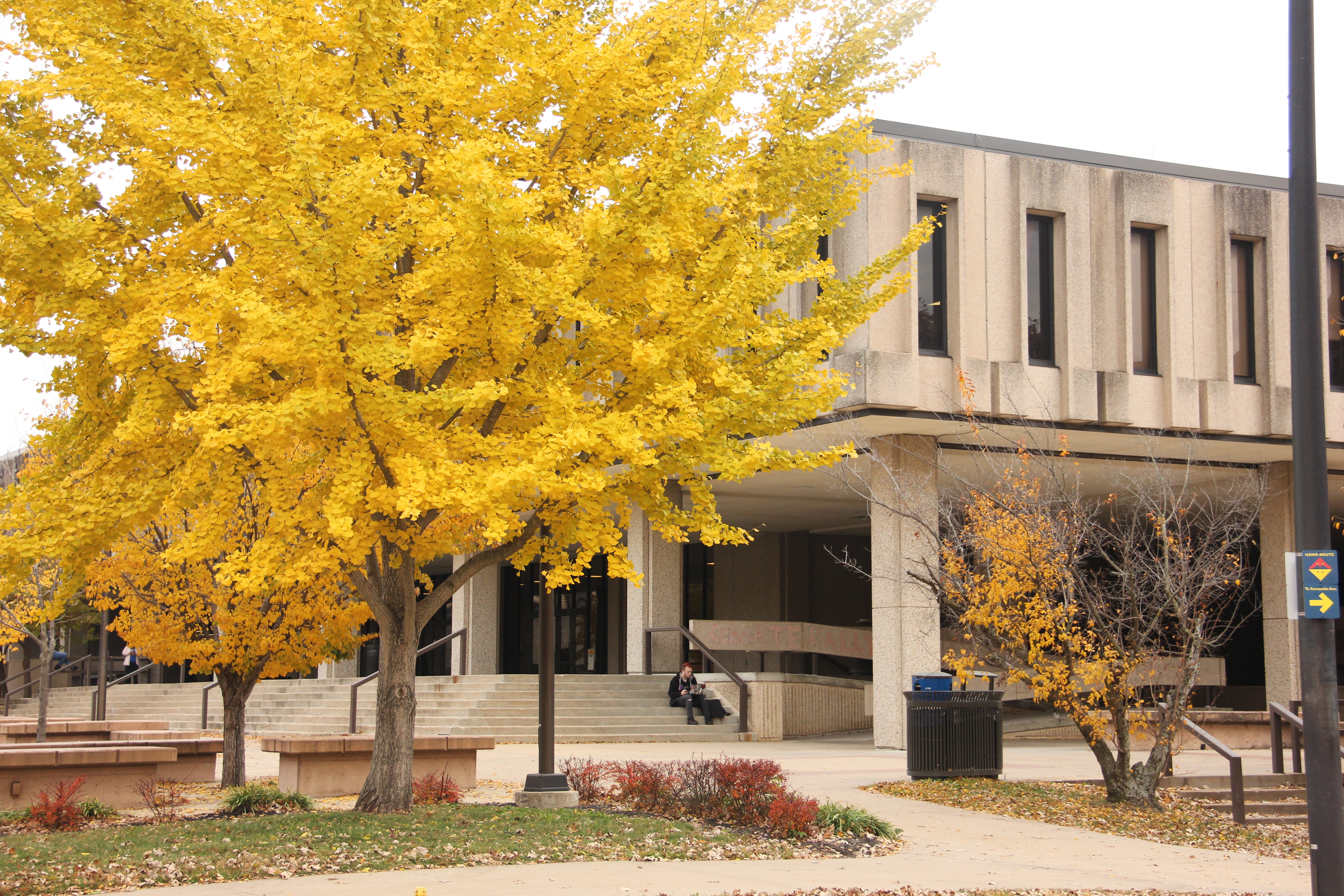
Wescoe Hall on the University of Kansas campus

The architecture of Lawrence is greatly varied. Most buildings built before 1860 were destroyed in the Lawrence Massacre. Architectural styles represented in Lawrence's historical areas are Victorian, Gothic Revival, Tudor, Romanesque and many others.

== Demographics ==
Historical population
Census	Pop.	Note	%±
1860	1,645		—
1870	8,320		405.8%
1880	8,510		2.3%
1890	9,997		17.5%
1900	10,862		8.7%
1910	12,374		13.9%
1920	12,456		0.7%
1930	13,726		10.2%
1940	14,390		4.8%
1950	23,351		62.3%
1960	32,858		40.7%
1970	45,698		39.1%
1980	52,738		15.4%
1990	65,608		24.4%
2000	80,098		22.1%
2010	87,643		9.4%
2020	94,934		8.3%
2024 (est.)	97,271		2.5%
U.S. Decennial Census; 2010-2020

Lawrence is part of the Kansas City (MO)–Overland Park–Kansas City (KS) Combined Statistical Area.

=== Racial and ethnic composition ===
Lawrence, Kansas – Racial and ethnic composition Note: the US Census treats Hispanic/Latino as an ethnic category. This table excludes Latinos from the racial categories and assigns them to a separate category. Hispanics/Latinos may be of any race.
Race / Ethnicity (NH = Non-Hispanic)	Pop 2000	Pop 2010	Pop 2020	% 2000	% 2010	% 2020
White alone (NH)	65,774	69,114	69,414	82.12%	78.86%	73.12%
Black or African American alone (NH)	3,989	3,948	4,868	4.98%	4.50%	5.13%
Native American or Alaska Native alone (NH)	2,201	2,425	2,346	2.75%	2.77%	2.47%
Asian alone (NH)	3,013	3,941	4,506	3.76%	4.50%	4.75%
Pacific Islander alone (NH)	49	51	65	0.06%	0.06%	0.07%
Some Other Race alone (NH)	122	137	421	0.15%	0.16%	0.44%
Mixed Race or Multi-Racial (NH)	2,029	3,021	5,985	2.53%	3.45%	6.30%
Hispanic or Latino (any race)	2,921	5,006	7,329	3.65%	5.71%	7.72%
Total	80,098	87,643	94,934	100.00%	100.00%	100.00%

=== 2020 census ===
As of the 2020 census, Lawrence had a population of 94,934, 39,688 households, and 19,602 families.

The population density was 2,779.7 per square mile (1,073.3/km^{2}). There were 43,421 housing units at an average density of 1,271.4 per square mile (490.9/km^{2}); 8.6% were vacant, with a homeowner vacancy rate of 1.9% and a rental vacancy rate of 7.7%.

The median age was 30.4 years; 17.8% of residents were under the age of 18, 23.1% were 18 to 24, 28.0% were 25 to 44, 18.5% were 45 to 64, and 12.6% were 65 years of age or older. For every 100 females there were 97.0 males, and for every 100 females age 18 and over there were 95.0 males age 18 and over.

99.8% of residents lived in urban areas, while 0.2% lived in rural areas.

Of the 39,688 households, 23.4% had children under the age of 18; 35.2% were married-couple households; 25.2% had a male householder with no spouse or partner present; and 31.1% had a female householder with no spouse or partner present. About 35.7% of all households were made up of individuals and 9.4% had someone living alone who was 65 years of age or older. The average household size was 2.3 and the average family size was 2.9.

Racial composition as of the 2020 census
Race	Number	Percent
White	71,500	75.3%
Black or African American	5,052	5.3%
American Indian and Alaska Native	2,688	2.8%
Asian	4,532	4.8%
Native Hawaiian and Other Pacific Islander	67	0.1%
Some other race	2,300	2.4%
Two or more races	8,795	9.3%
Hispanic or Latino (of any race)	7,329	7.7%

=== Education ===
The percent of those with a bachelor's degree or higher was estimated to be 35.9% of the population.

=== Income ===
The 2016–2020 5-year American Community Survey estimates show that the median household income was $55,598 (with a margin of error of ± $2,504) and the median family income was $88,286 (± $5,989). Males had a median income of $30,003 (± $3,256) versus $21,802 (± $1,388) for females. The median income for those above 16 years old was $25,556 (± $1,091). Approximately, 7.3% of families and 18.8% of the population were below the poverty line, including 12.0% of those under the age of 18 and 6.6% of those ages 65 or over.

=== 2010 census ===
As of the census of 2010, there were 87,643 people, 34,970 households, and 16,939 families residing in the city. The population density was 2,611.5 inhabitants per square mile (1,008.3/km^{2}). There were 37,502 housing units at an average density of 1,117.5 per square mile (431.5/km^{2}). The racial makeup of the city was 82.0% White, 4.7% African American, 3.1% Native American, 4.5% Asian, 0.1% Pacific Islander, 1.5% from other races, and 4.1% from two or more races. Hispanic or Latino of any race were 5.7% of the population.

There were 34,970 households, of which 24.4% had children under the age of 18 living with them, 35.6% were married couples living together, 8.8% had a female householder with no husband present, 4.0% had a male householder with no wife present, and 51.6% were non-families. 32.0% of all households were made up of individuals, and 6.5% had someone living alone who was 65 years of age or older. The average household size was 2.28 and the average family size was 2.91.

In the city, the population was spread out, with 17.5% of residents under the age of 18; 28.7% of residents between the ages of 18 and 24; 27.4% from 25 to 44; 18.5% from 45 to 64; and 8% were 65 years of age or older. The median age in the city was 26.7 years. The gender makeup of the city was 50.2% male and 49.8% female.

As of 2010 the median income for a household was $41,290, and the median income for a family was $65,673. Males had a median income of $42,362 versus $34,124 for females. The per capita income for the city was $23,666. About 10.7% of families and 23.4% of the population were below the poverty line, including 16.2% of those under age 18 and 7.1% of those age 65 or over.

== Economy ==
Lawrence's economy largely depends on educational institutions, namely The University of Kansas, which is the largest employer in the city as of 2020 with 10,116 employees, followed by Maximus (a call center), Lawrence Memorial Hospital (the city's hospital) and Hallmark Cards.

=== Homelessness ===
As of 2020, Lawrence's unemployment rate had grown by 3.7%. Since 2019, the city has seen a rise in homelessness. In 2021, NPR reported that Lawrence and nearby Kansas City, Kansas had a large rise in homelessness. In Lawrence, the situation necessitated that the city construct an encampment for people to seek temporary shelter. In early 2021, reportedly 200 homeless people lived on the banks of the Kansas River, and wooded areas near nature trails in Lawrence, and hundreds of others setting up encampments in city parks. In February 2023, the Lawrence City Commission approved an ordinance banning source of income discrimination, disallowing landlords from rejecting housing vouchers. The ordinance also banned discrimination in housing due to immigration status and being a survivor of sexual assault.

== Historic sites and museums ==
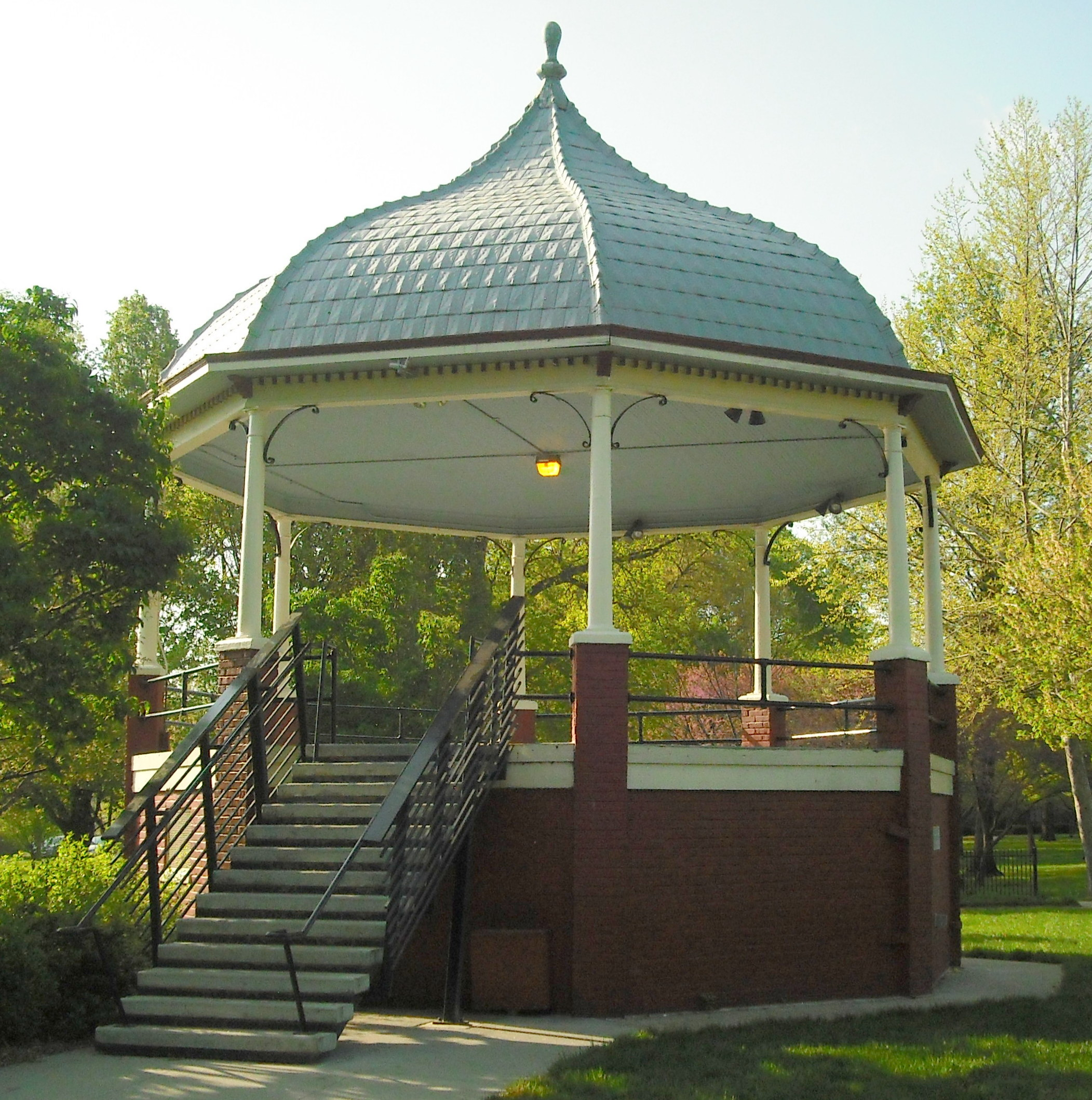
The South Park gazebo

South Park is a large park in Downtown Lawrence divided by Massachusetts Street just south of the county courthouse between North Park and South Park Streets. The park originally consisted of four separate parks—Lafayette, Hamilton, Washington and Franklin Parks—but was combined to form one park. South Park was developed in 1854 as part of the original city plat. A gazebo was built in South Park in 1910 and is used for annual city band performances during the summer months.

The Watkins Museum of History is a block north of South Park and houses exhibits from Lawrence and Douglas County. The building is managed by the Douglas County Historical Society and used to be Watkins National Bank (1888–1929) and Lawrence City Hall (1929–1970). The building features a range of architectural styles from the period it was constructed. Today it houses the Watkins Museum of History, which offers free admission and three floors of traditional and computer interactive exhibits. Next door to the museum is a Japanese Friendship Garden designed by the city and representatives from sister city Hiratsuka, Japan. An exhibit on the Bleeding Kansas era and the Freedom's Frontier National Heritage Area is in the old Lawrence Public Library at 9th and Vermont Streets. Other museums on KU campus include the Natural History Museum in Dyche Hall, the Spencer Museum of Art and the Dole Institute of Politics among others.

Centennial Park, between 6th and 9th Streets and Rockledge Road and Iowa Street, was established in 1954 for the city's 100th anniversary. The park features rolling hills, a skatepark, a disc golf course and a Polaris missile constructed during the Cold War. Sesquicentennial Park is near Clinton Lake and was established for Lawrence's 150th anniversary and is mostly undeveloped but features a timeline of Lawrence history and a time capsule to be opened in 2054.

Liberty Hall was built when the Bowersock Opera House burned down in 1911. Liberty Hall is a theater typically showcasing independent movies and frequent live acts. Liberty Hall also runs a video rental next door. The Granada Theater was originally built in 1928 as a vaudeville theater. It was renovated in 1934 as a movie theater until closing in 1989. It was renovated again in 1993 and opened as a venue for comedy acts and live music.

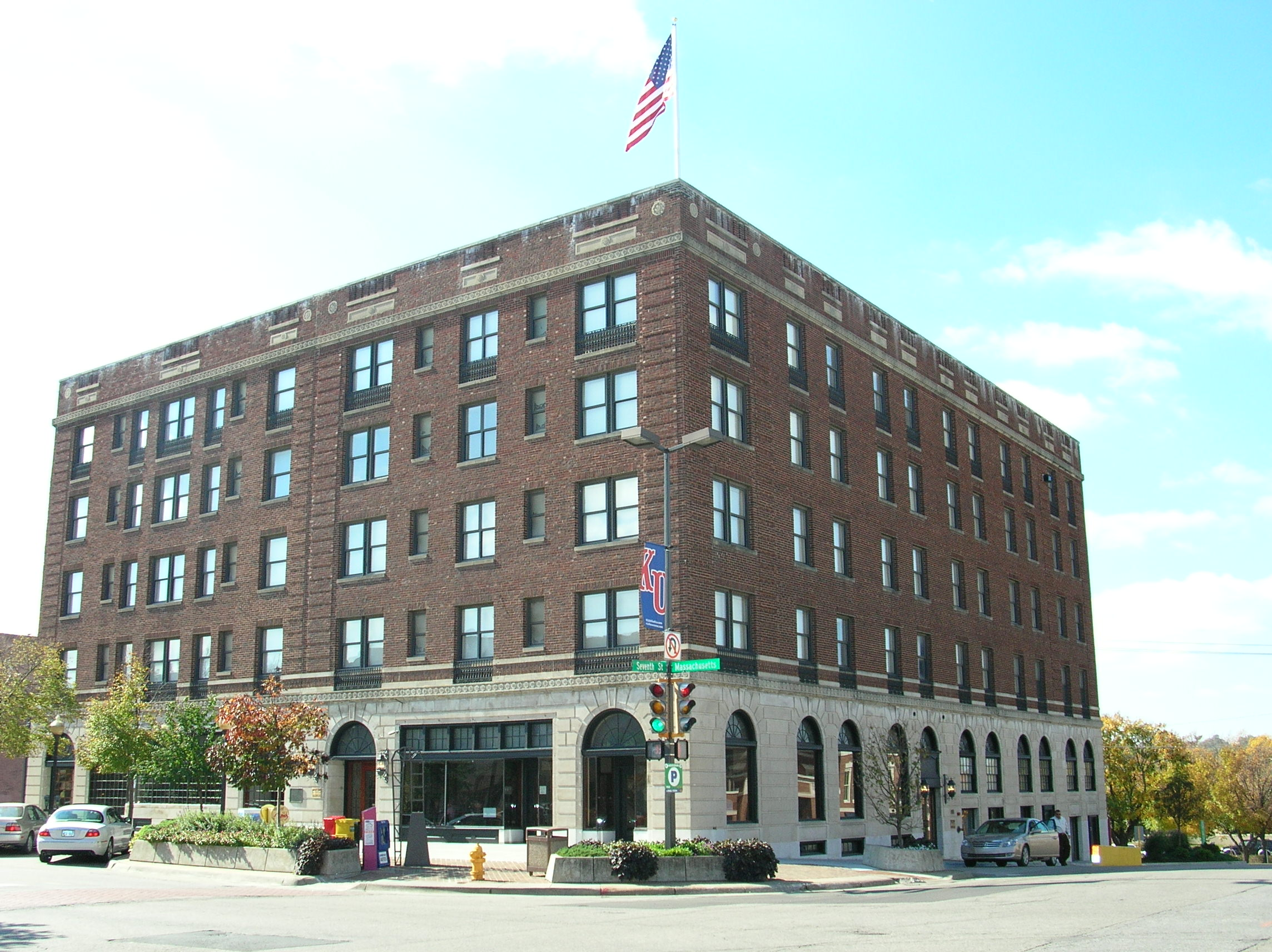
The Eldridge Hotel

The Eldridge Hotel was first built in 1855 as the Free State Hotel. During the 1855 sack of Lawrence, the hotel was burned to the ground, and its ruins were purchased by Col. Shalor Eldridge, who rebuilt it and named it the Eldridge House. This version of the structure was destroyed during Quantrill's Raid, but once again Eldridge rebuilt it. In 1925, this structure was rebuilt in its current form, and in 1970, the hotel was converted into apartments. In 1985, work began to renovate the Eldridge and turn it back into a hotel, and in 2004 the building was sold and completely renovated back to its 1925 look. It is a popular rumor that the ghost of Eldridge haunts the hotel.

Memorial Stadium and Allen Fieldhouse are on KU campus. Memorial Stadium was built in 1920 for the Kansas Jayhawks football program. It was named to honor KU students who died in World War I. Allen Fieldhouse was built in 1955 for the basketball program and was named for Phog Allen, a coach at KU from 1907 to 1909 and 1919 to 1956. On November 4, 2010, the ESPN's online publication, The Magazine, named Allen Fieldhouse the loudest college basketball arena in the country.

Oak Hill Cemetery in east Lawrence was established in 1866 and was called by William Allen White the "Kansas Arlington". The cemetery features the burials of James Lane, Lucy Hobbs Taylor, Langston Hughes' grandparents Charles Henry Langston and Mary Sampson Patterson Leary Langston, numerous veterans and many prominent Kansans. Across the street is Memorial Park Cemetery which features a memorial for KU coach and inventor of basketball James Naismith. The memorial is a cenotaph but Naismith is buried in the mason section of Memorial Park.

Lawrence is also the site of many historic houses related to the history of the city. The Robert Miller house survived Quantrill's Raid and was a stop on the Underground Railroad, Ferdinand Fuller, an original settler of Lawrence, built his house atop of Windmill Hill in what is now the Hillcrest Neighborhood and the John Roberts House, commonly called the Castle Tea Room, was designed by famed architect John G. Haskell in 1894 and is now used for various formal events. There are many other houses of historic prominence in Lawrence, many of them on the National Register of Historic Places.

== Arts and culture ==
The city is known for a thriving music and art scene. The New York Times said Lawrence had "the most vital music scene between Chicago and Denver" in a travel column on February 25, 2005.

The Lied Center of Kansas presents Broadway musicals, internationally touring dance companies and headline artists such as The Beach Boys, Kristin Chenoweth, Lyle Lovett and Kansas.

In December 2005, the city announced International Dadaism Month, celebrating the early 20th century art movement. In the spirit of Dada, rather than select a typical calendar month for the occasion, Mayor Dennis "Boog" Highberger set the dates for the "Month" as February 4, March 28, April 1, July 15, August 2, August 7, August 16, August 26, September 18, September 22, October 1, October 17, and October 26, determined by rolling dice and pulling numbers out of a hat.

Lawrence is home to many bands and record labels. Many artists, such as Paw, Mates of State, The New Amsterdams, Kansas, Fourth of July, White Flight, The Anniversary, Minus Story, The Appleseed Cast, Old Canes, Ad Astra Per Aspera, Ghosty, The Esoteric and The Get Up Kids originated in Lawrence or its surrounding areas. KJHK 90.7 FM, the University of Kansas's student-run radio station, is a staple of the local music scene.

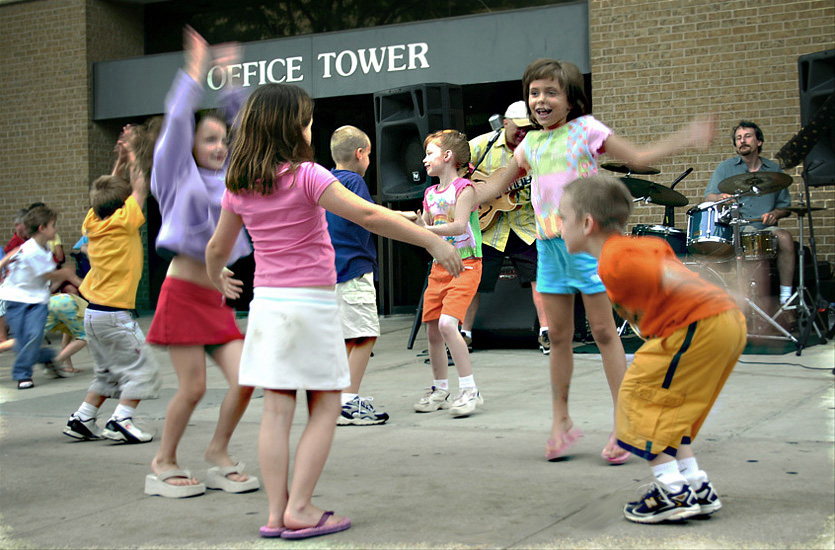
A Thursday Brown Bag Concert on the streets of downtown Lawrence

The Wakarusa Music and Camping Festival was a four-day-long weekend music festival held annually in early June just outside Lawrence, at Clinton State Park. After its inception in 2004, the festival grew dramatically by 2006, with almost 60,000 tickets sold, and developed a nationwide following that accounted for 80% of ticket sales. The festival featured an eclectic mix of music, with artists like The Flaming Lips, Wilco, STS9, Medeski, Martin and Wood, Neko Case, and Widespread Panic taking the stage. The event is kept smaller than other festivals such as Bonnaroo by an agreement with the state. Activities other than music include disc golf, yoga, hiking, and swimming in Clinton Lake. The festival was relocated to Mulberry Mountain due to a dispute between the organizers and the Kansas Department of Wildlife and Parks over limiting attendees and over rent payment.

Lawrence is home to the Gunn Center for the Study of Science Fiction, the first research center in the world dedicated to science fiction studies. Since 1969, the center has offered courses and workshops in science fiction literature and writing, hosted an annual conference, brought speakers to Lawrence, and presented multiple annual awards and scholarships.

Every summer since 1959 there is the Massachusetts Street "sidewalk sale", which most businesses on Massachusetts Street offer discounts on their merchandise. The sale is often supplemented by band performances or radio stations playing during the event.

== Sports ==
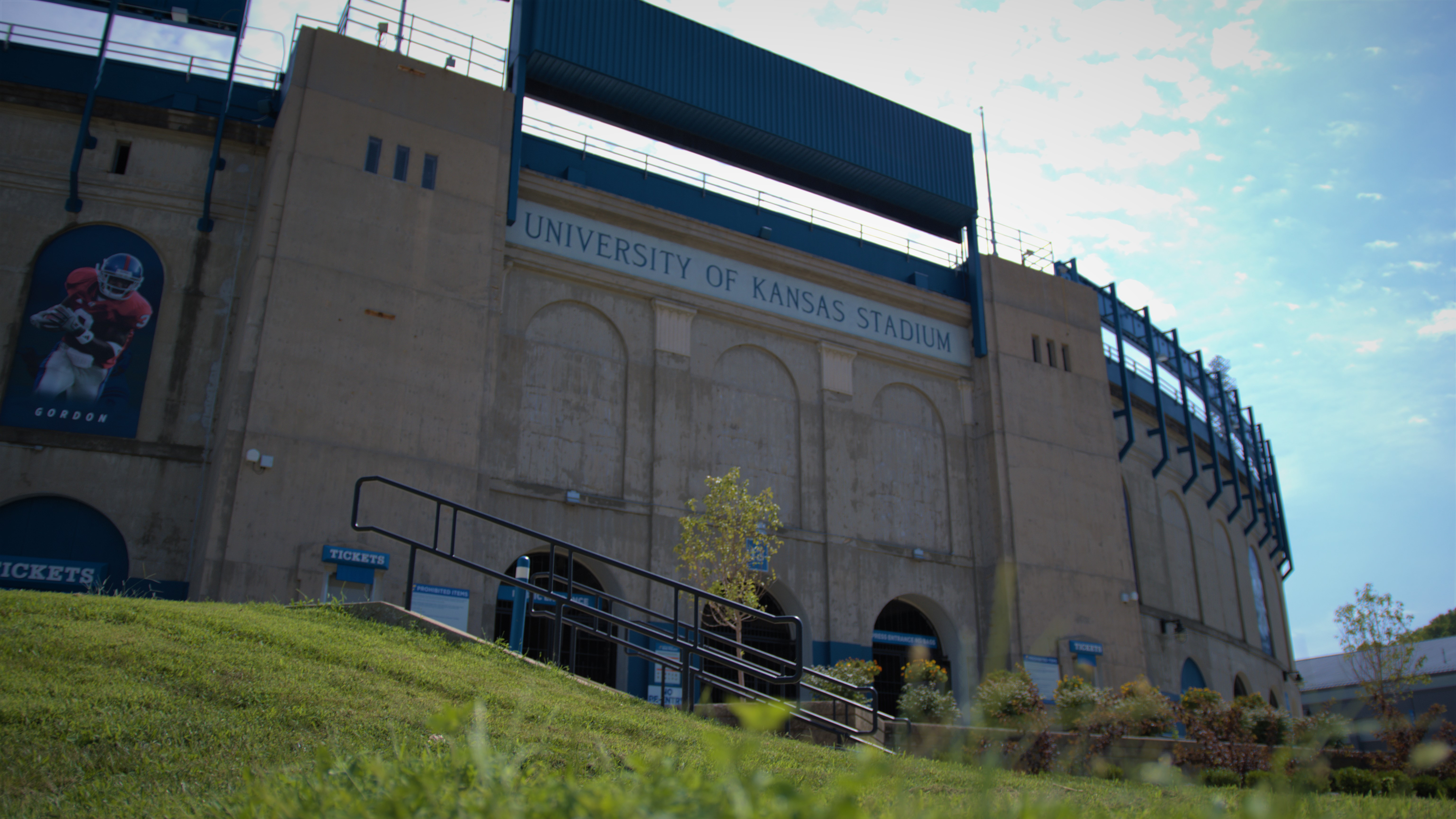
David Booth Kansas Memorial Stadium, the oldest stadium west of the Mississippi River, opened in 1921 and is the home of the Kansas Jayhawks football team.

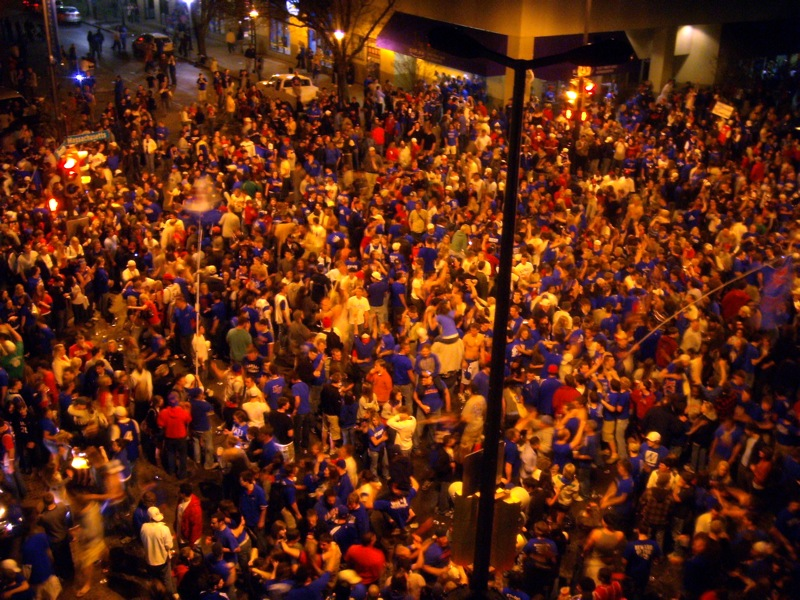
Kansas fans celebrate the Jayhawks' victory in the 2008 Final Four on Massachusetts Street.

Lawrence is also the home of the University of Kansas (KU) athletic teams. The perennially highly ranked Kansas Jayhawks basketball team (1922 and 1923 Helms Foundation National Champions and 1952, 1988, 2008, and 2022 NCAA Champions) is closely followed by most residents during the winter. Massachusetts Street, the primary street of downtown Lawrence, flooded with fans in 2002, 2003, 2008, 2012, and 2022, after both KU's victories and defeats in the final rounds of the NCAA tournaments those years. KU's football team had their best record in their school history in the 2007–2008 season going 12–1 and culminating with a victory in the Orange Bowl. In 2008, the football and basketball programs achieved a 49-4 record, the most combined wins by the two NCAA sports in a single season.

During the 2026 FIFA World Cup, the Algeria national football team established its team base camp in Lawrence, where it trained at Rock Chalk Park at The University of Kansas and stayed at The Oread hotel throughout the tournament. The city publicly announced the selection in February 2026. Additionally, on June 10, 2026, Rock Chalk Park hosted Algeria's final pre–2026 FIFA World Cup warm-up match, an international friendly against Bolivia, which Algeria won 4–0.

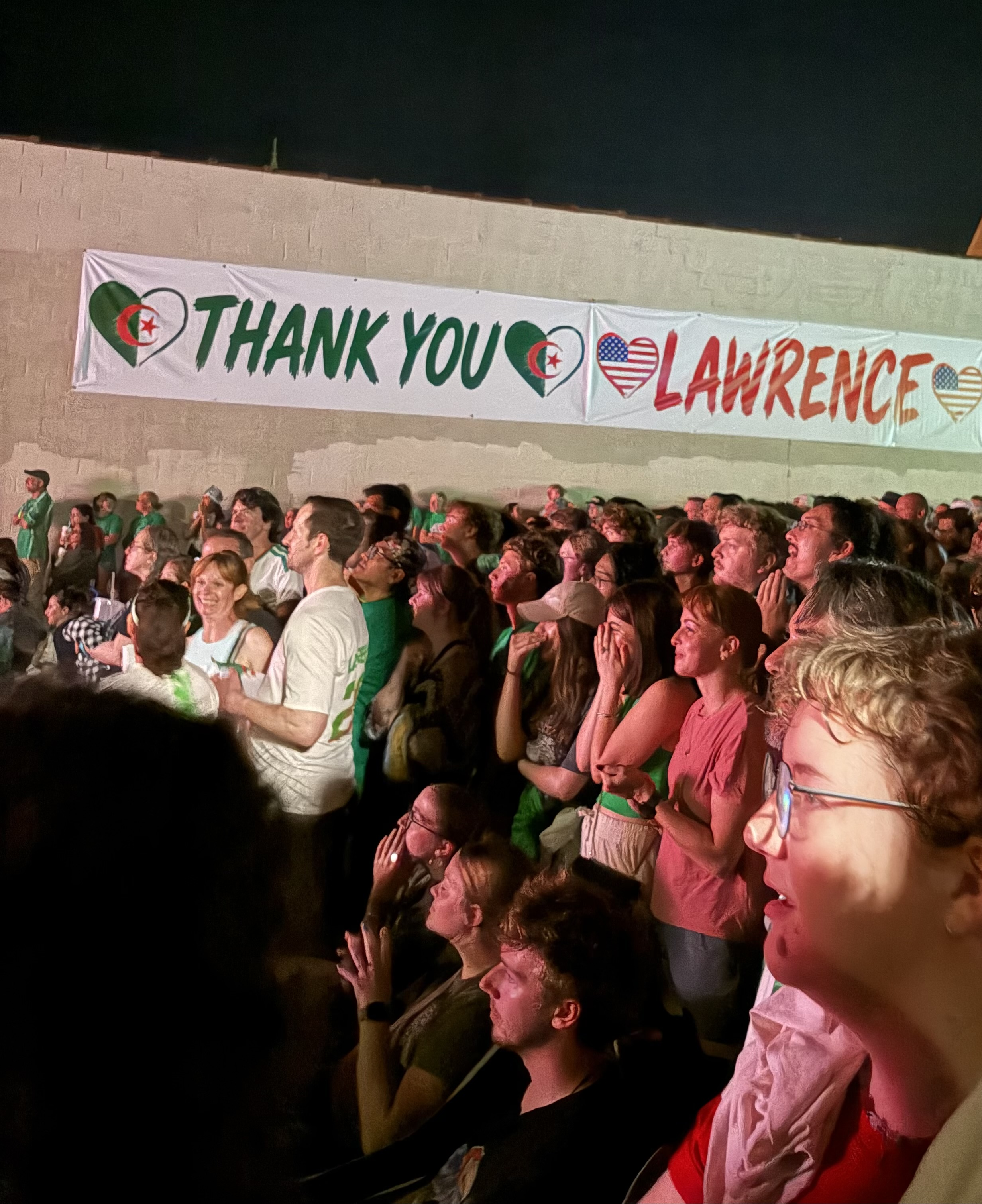
Downtown watch party for Algeria v Switzerland match

Lawrence honored the University of Kansas's mascot, the Jayhawk, in 2003 when 30 statues of Jayhawks were commissioned by the Lawrence Convention and Visitors Bureau; these can be seen throughout the city as part of an art installation called "Jayhawks on Parade". The Jayhawks also field a soccer team, baseball and softball teams, track and field teams, cross country teams, and a men's club hockey team. KU also has a club rugby team, run by the KU Rugby Football club, with a clubhouse in North Johnny's Tavern. They also run the high school and the club team.

In 1893, Lawrence briefly hosted a minor league baseball team, the Lawrence Jayhawks. The team played as members of the Class A level Western Association and hosted home minor league games at the South Massachusetts Street Ballpark.

== Government ==
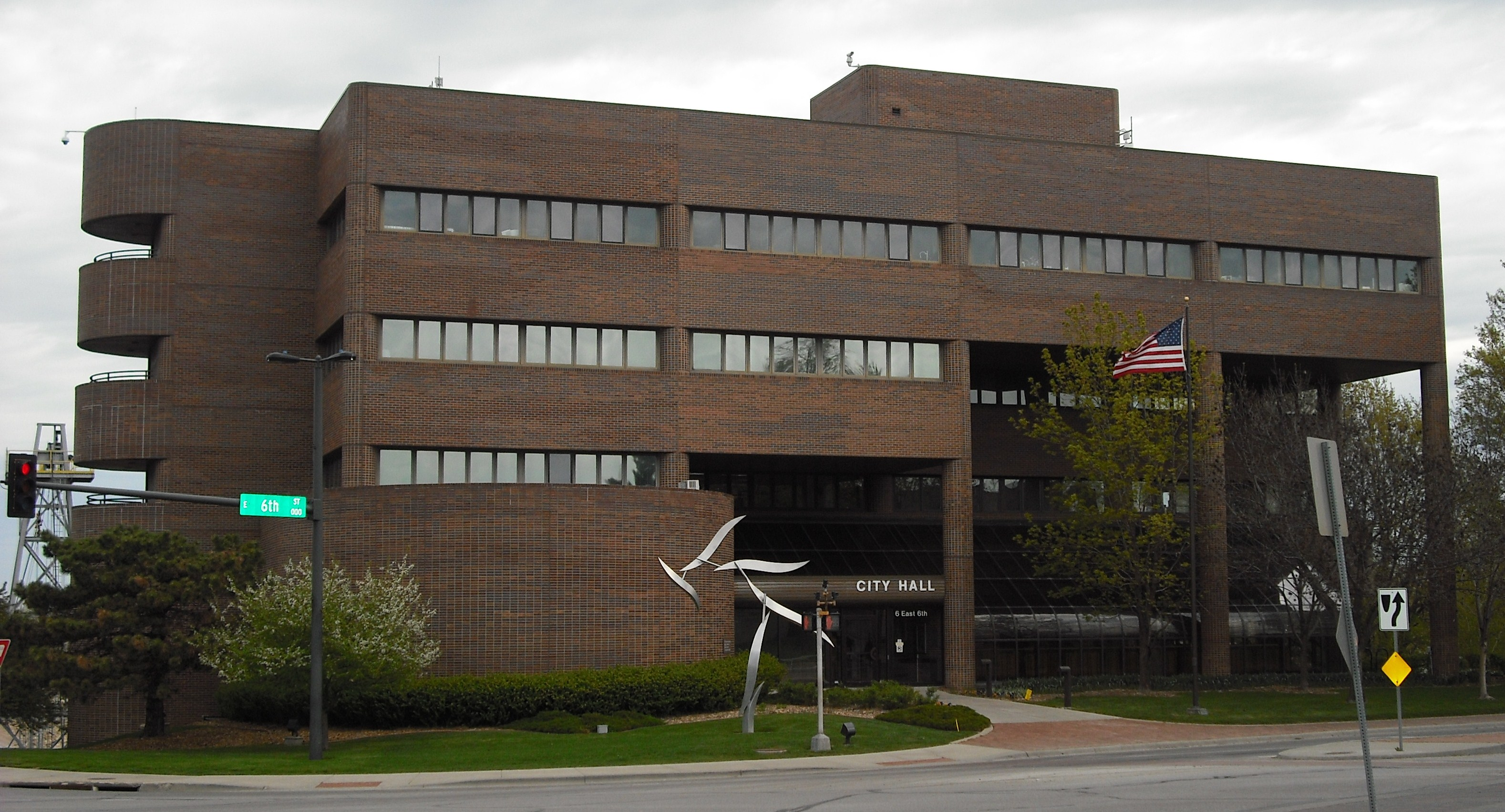
City Hall

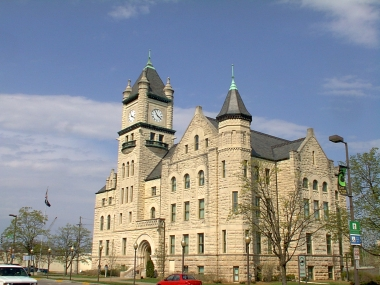
The Douglas County Courthouse

Lawrence is run by a city commission and city manager. Commissioners consists of five individuals elected by the citizens. Three commissioner seats are up for reelection every two years. The two top vote-getters receive a four-year term, third-place finisher receives a two-year term. The commission elects a mayor and vice-mayor every year in April, usually the two top vote-getters, and also hires the city manager. Lawrence uses plurality-at-large voting (also known as block voting) for its municipal elections, whereby voters may choose up to three candidates for office.

While Kansas is a heavily Republican state, Lawrence is often considered a bastion of the modern Democratic Party, and has been since the late 1980s. Douglas County, where Lawrence is situated, was one of only two counties in Kansas whose majority voted for John Kerry in the 2004 presidential election, one of only three that voted for Barack Obama in the 2008 election and one of the only two counties to vote for Hillary Clinton in the 2016 presidential election. Douglas County has supported the Democratic candidate for the past nine presidential elections.

Lawrence is served by Democratic state representatives Suzanne Wikle, Mike Amyx, Barbara Ballard and Brooklynne Mosley, and by state senators Marci Francisco (Democrat), Rick Kloos (Republican), and Patrick Schmidt (Democrat). Lawrence is represented federally by Republican Tracey Mann of the 1st and U.S. Senators Roger Marshall and Jerry Moran, both Republicans. Prior to 2002, Lawrence sat entirely within the 3rd district until reapportionment split Lawrence between the 2nd and 3rd districts. In 2012, Lawrence was placed entirely within the 2nd district. In 2022, the Kansas State Legislature moved Lawrence into the 1st district after legal challenges failed in the Kansas Supreme Court.

Lawrence was the first city in Kansas to enact an ordinance prohibiting discrimination on the basis of sexual orientation (enacted in 1995, after a campaign called Simply Equal). On October 4, 2011, Lawrence became the first city in Kansas to prohibit discrimination based on gender identity with the passage of City Ordinance No. 8672. The effort to pass the GIO was led by Scott Criqui from the Kansas Equality Coalition. Scott Criqui would go on to become the first openly gay candidate to run for office and win a primary in Lawrence. Douglas County was the only county in Kansas to reject the amendment to the Kansas Constitution prohibiting both gay marriage and civil unions in April 2005. The vote against the amendment was primarily in the city of Lawrence; outside the city in the rest of Douglas County, the amendment carried. Lawrence has an active chapter of the Kansas Equality Coalition, which persuaded the city commission to approve a domestic partner registry on May 22, 2007. The registry, which took effect on August 1, 2007, provides unmarried couples —both same-sex and other-sex— some recognition by the city for legal purposes.

== Education ==
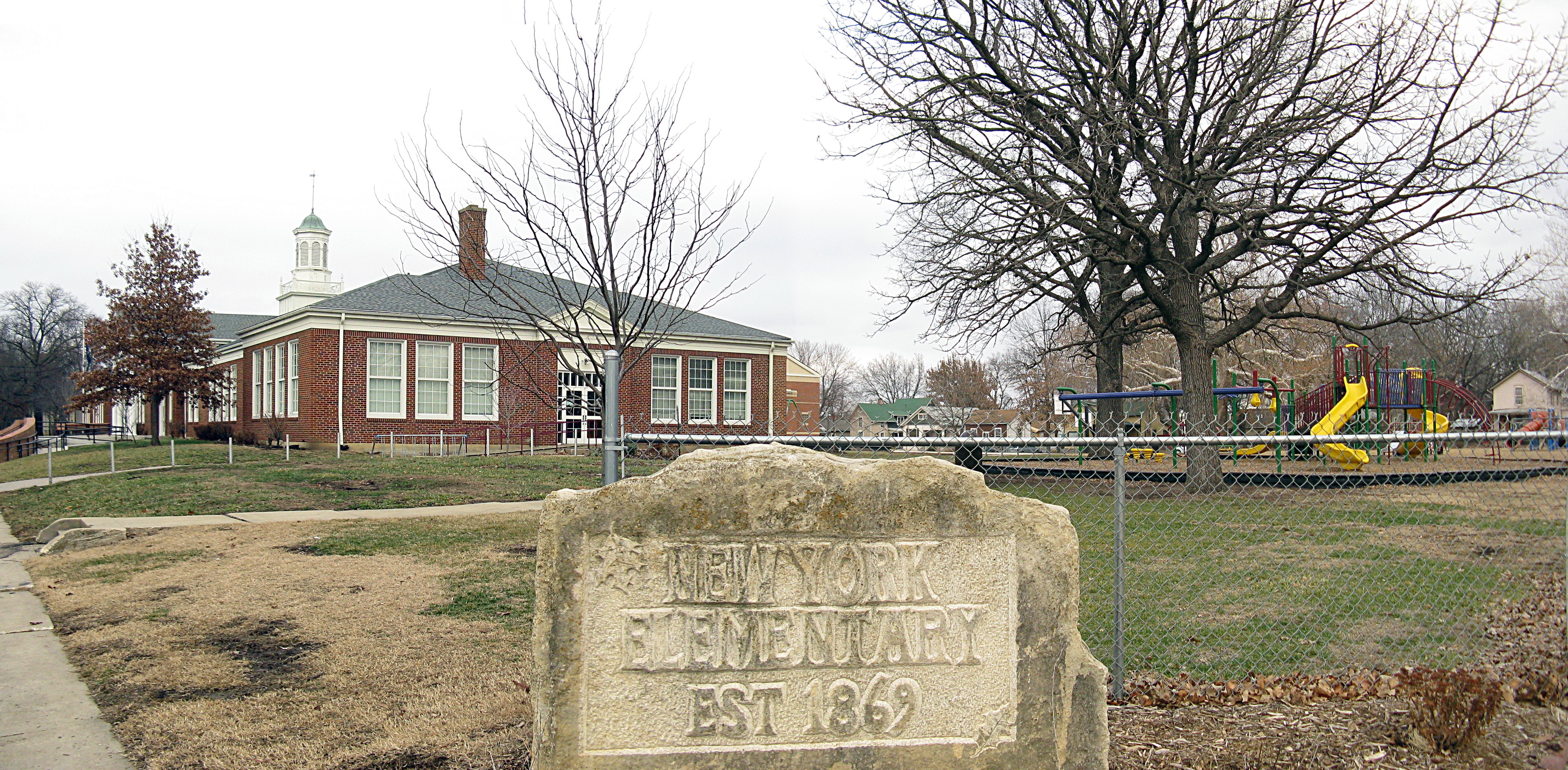
New York Street Elementary School in Lawrence

=== Primary and secondary education ===
The Lawrence USD 497 public school district includes almost all of the Lawrence city limits. This district has 12 elementary schools, four middle schools. and two high schools. The city's 12 public elementary schools include: Langston Hughes Elementary (named after Langston Hughes); Quail Run Elementary, Cordley Elementary (named after Richard Cordley), Hillcrest Elementary, Kennedy Early Childhood (formerly Kennedy Elementary, closed in 2021), Pinckney Elementary, Prairie Park Elementary, New York Elementary, Schwegler Elementary, Sunflower Elementary, Sunset Hill Elementary, Woodlawn Elementary, and Deerfield Elementary. The middle schools include: West, Billy Mills (named after Billy Mills, and formerly named South), Liberty Memorial Central Middle School (Usually shortened to Central or LMCMS), and Southwest. The high schools include: Lawrence High School and Lawrence Free State High School (the athletic teams of the former are nicknamed the Chesty Lions, and those of the latter are the Firebirds).

Newer developments in the northwestern part of the Lawrence area, including a few small parcels of the city limits, are within the boundaries for Perry-Lecompton School District, and students in this area attend Lecompton Elementary, Perry Elementary, Perry-Lecompton Middle School, and Perry-Lecompton High School.

Private schools include Bishop Seabury Academy (grades 6 to 12) (affiliate of Episcopal Church), Veritas Christian School (grades pre-K to 12) (interdenominational), St. John Catholic School (grades pre-K to 8), Corpus Christi Catholic School (grades pre-K to 8), Raintree Montessori School (grades pre-K to 8) (Montessori school), Prairie Moon School (grades pre-K to 8) (Waldorf school), and Limestone Community School (as of 2023, grades K to 4).

=== Colleges and universities ===
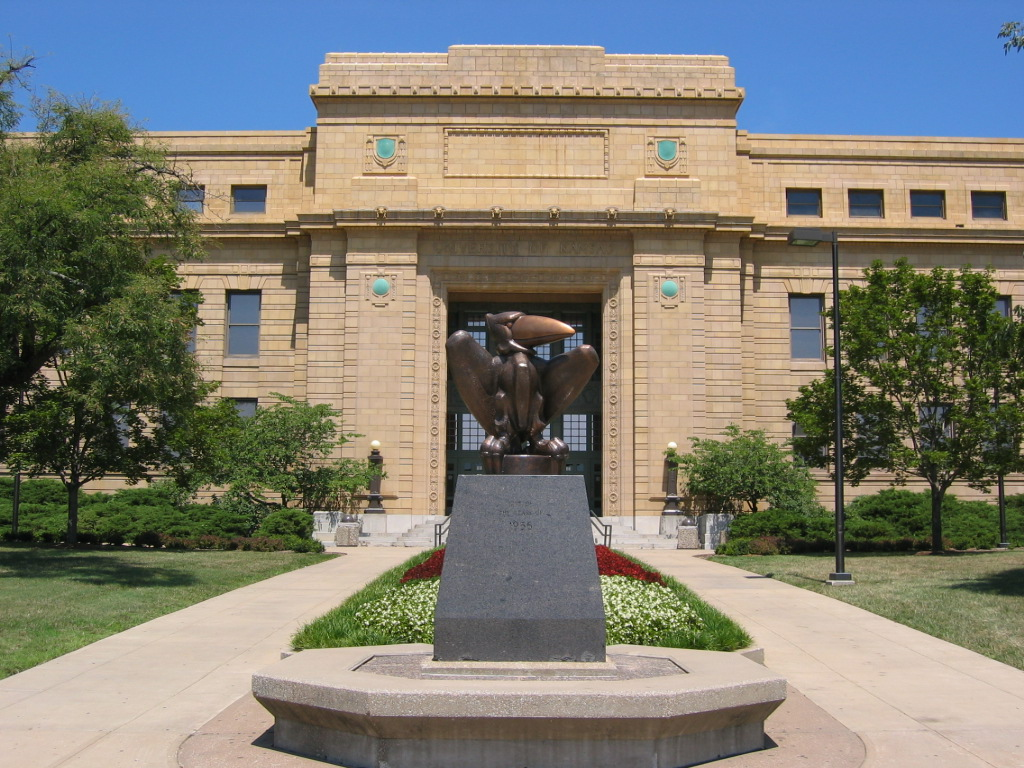
Strong Hall on the KU Campus

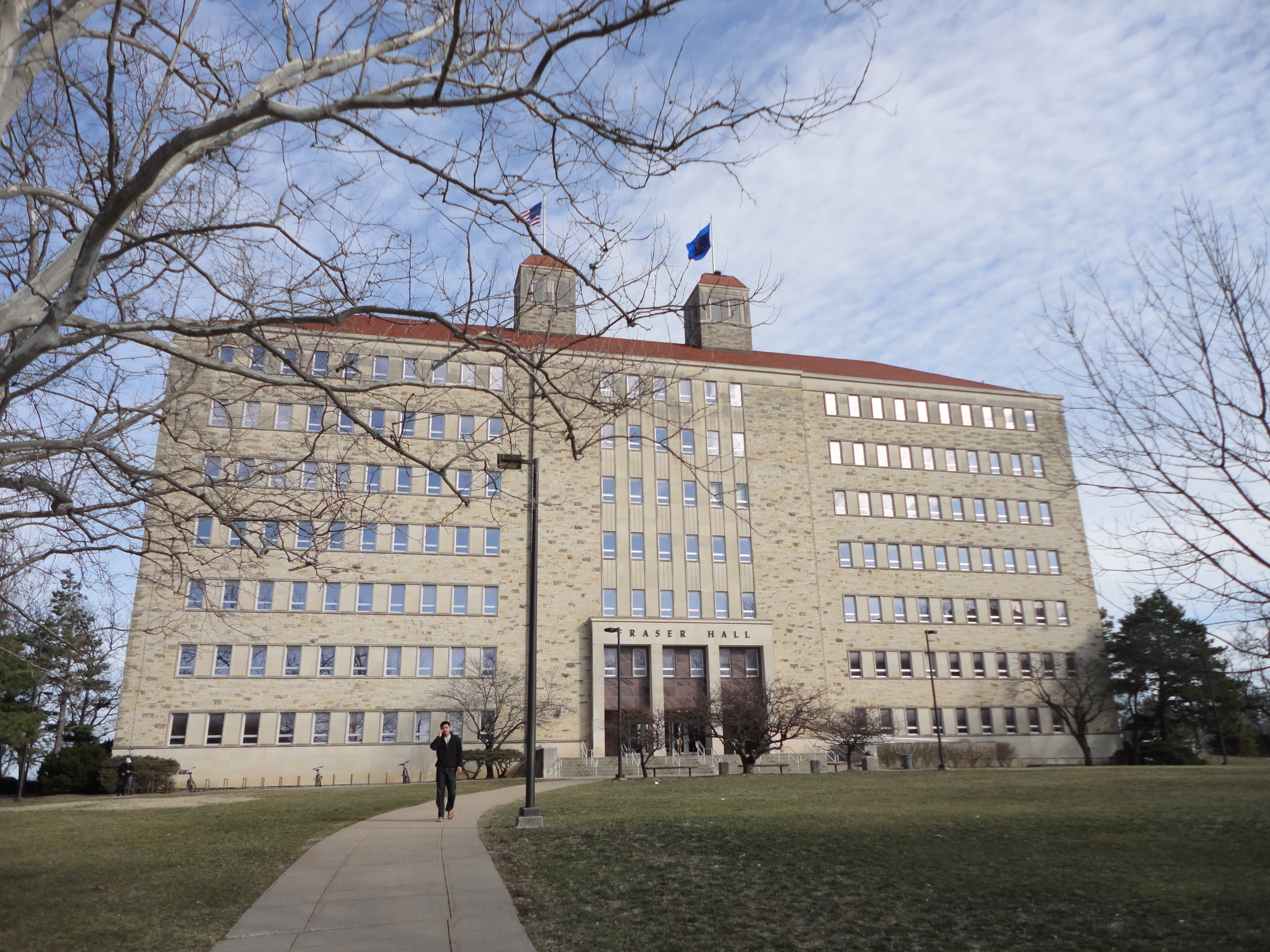
Fraser Hall on the KU Campus

The University of Kansas is the largest public university in the state with total enrollment of just more than 30,000 students (including approximately 3,000 students at the KU Medical Center in Kansas City, KS). A Big 12 school, the University of Kansas has more than 170 fields of study and the nationally known Kansas Jayhawks athletics programs. Haskell Indian Nations University offers free tuition to members of registered Native American tribes. However, students are required to pay semester fees similar to many other colleges in the United States. It has an average enrollment of more than 1,000 (with students hailing from all 50 U.S. states and from over 150 tribes). Haskell University is also the home of the American Indian Athletic Hall of Fame and the Haskell Cultural Center. Several private Christian colleges and schools are in Lawrence as well, such as Heritage Baptist College.

=== Libraries ===
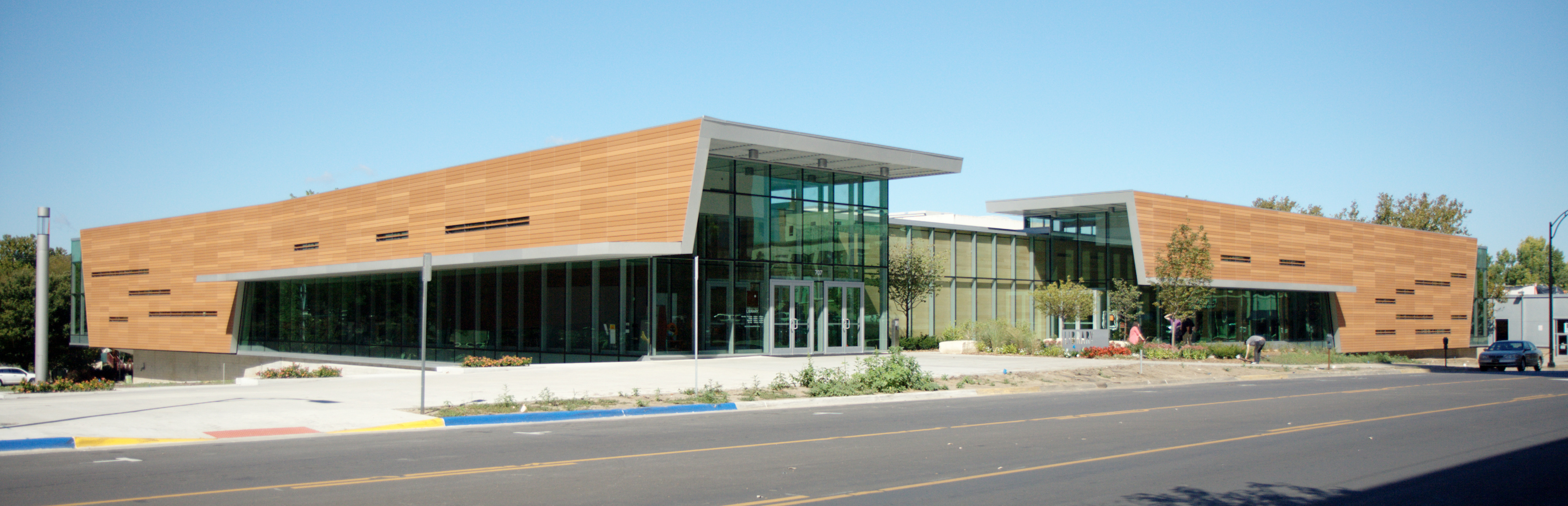
Lawrence Public Library (2014)

The first library in Lawrence was started in October 1854 and was a subscription library costing $1 a year. After the Lawrence Massacre destroyed the library, a new one was started in 1865 and placed under city jurisdiction in 1871. In 1902, Peter Emery successfully got a grant from Andrew Carnegie to build a new library at 9th and Vermont Streets. The Lawrence Public Library opened in 1904. A new library to replace the aging and outdated Carnegie Building was completed in 1972 at 7th and Vermont Streets with voters approving a bond issue in 2010 to expand and update the building. During construction, the library moved to 7th and New Hampshire in the former Borders bookstore. The new library opened in July 2014.

The Lawrence Public Library was one of seven libraries in the United States that won the AIA/ALA Library Building Award in 2016.

== Media ==
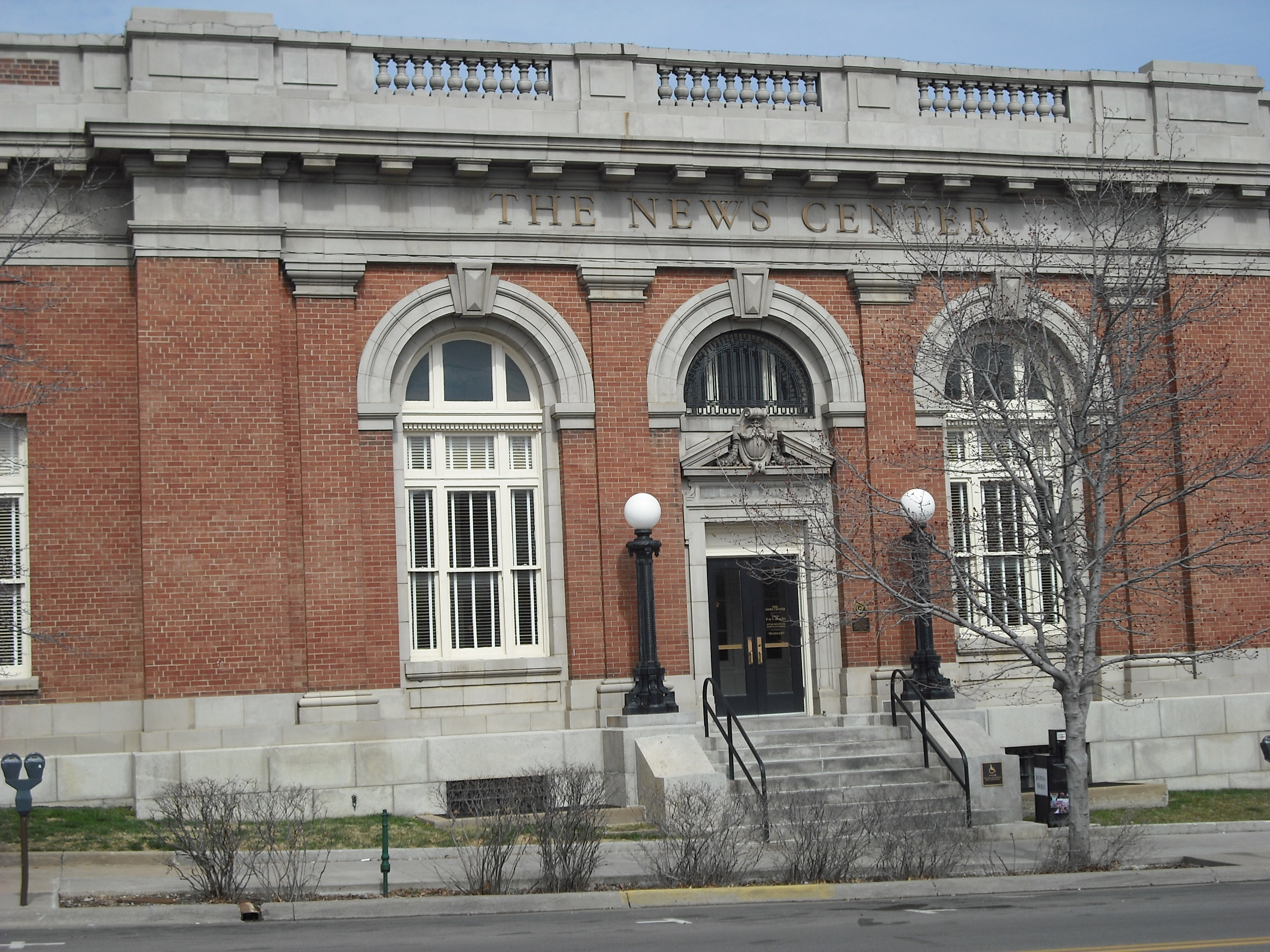
Lawrence Journal-World newspaper offices, before they moved in May 2019. The building previously was used for the Lawrence post office.

One of the first businesses established in Lawrence was a newspaper, the Herald of Freedom, which began in October 1854 and ceased publication in 1859. In August 1885, the Lawrence Daily Journal began and the Lawrence Daily World began in June 1895. These papers would merge in 1911 to become the Lawrence Journal-World although the masthead lists the founding as 1858, probably in reference to the Herald of Freedom. Other newspapers include The University Daily Kansan, a student newspaper from the University of Kansas, The Lawrence Times, an online newspaper founded by former Lawrence Journal-World employees, and Change of Heart, a street newspaper sold by homeless vendors.

Radio stations in Lawrence include KLWN, an AM station that began in 1951. FM stations are KU's student station KJHK, KANU, a NPR member station, K241AR, a Christian station that broadcasts Air 1, KCIU-LP, a religious station and KKSW, formerly KLZR, a Top 40 station. KMXN, a country station, also broadcasts from Lawrence but is licensed to Osage City. Listeners can also receive stations from Kansas City and Topeka.

Lawrence is in the Kansas City television market, but viewers can also receive stations from the Topeka market as well. Television stations licensed and/or broadcasting from Lawrence are KUJH-LP, a KU student station, and KMCI which broadcasts from Kansas City, Missouri.

From 1947 until 1981, Lawrence was the location of the Centron Corporation, one of the major industrial and educational film production companies in the United States at the time. The studio was founded by two University of Kansas graduates and employed university students and faculty members as advisers and actors. Also, many talented local and area filmmakers were given their first chances to make movies with Centron, and some stayed for decades. Others went on to successful careers in Hollywood. One of these local residents, Herk Harvey, was employed by Centron as a director for 35 years and in the middle of his tenure there he made a full-length theatrical film, Carnival of Souls, a horror cult film shot mostly in Lawrence and released in 1962. The Centron Corporation soundstage and residing building is now called Oldfather Studios and houses the University of Kansas film program.

=== Print ===
Lawrence is the home of a daily newspaper, the Lawrence Journal-World, and Kaw Valley Senior Monthly, a monthly publication for senior citizens. The student newspaper of the University of Kansas is The University Daily Kansan, which stopped publishing regular print editions in 2020 due to the COVID-19 Pandemic and removed the paper's distribution boxes.

=== Radio ===
The following radio stations are licensed to Lawrence, Kansas:

AM radio
Frequency	Callsign	Format
1320	KLWN	News and talk

FM radio
Frequency	Callsign	Format	Notes
90.7	KJHK	Student radio, Sports, News, Alternative	
91.1	KCIU	Christian radio	
91.5	KANU	Kansas Public Radio (NPR)	
92.9	KMXN	Country	
96.1	K241AR	Christian radio	Air1
101.7	KLWN	News and talk	
105.9	KKSW	Top 40	

=== Television ===
The following television stations are licensed to Lawrence, Kansas:

Television
Digital channel	Analog channel	Callsign	Network
31	31	KUJH-LP	Student-run television for the University of Kansas
32	—N/a	Midco Sports Network	Local sports network broadcasting high school sports and college press conferences

== Infrastructure ==
=== Transportation ===
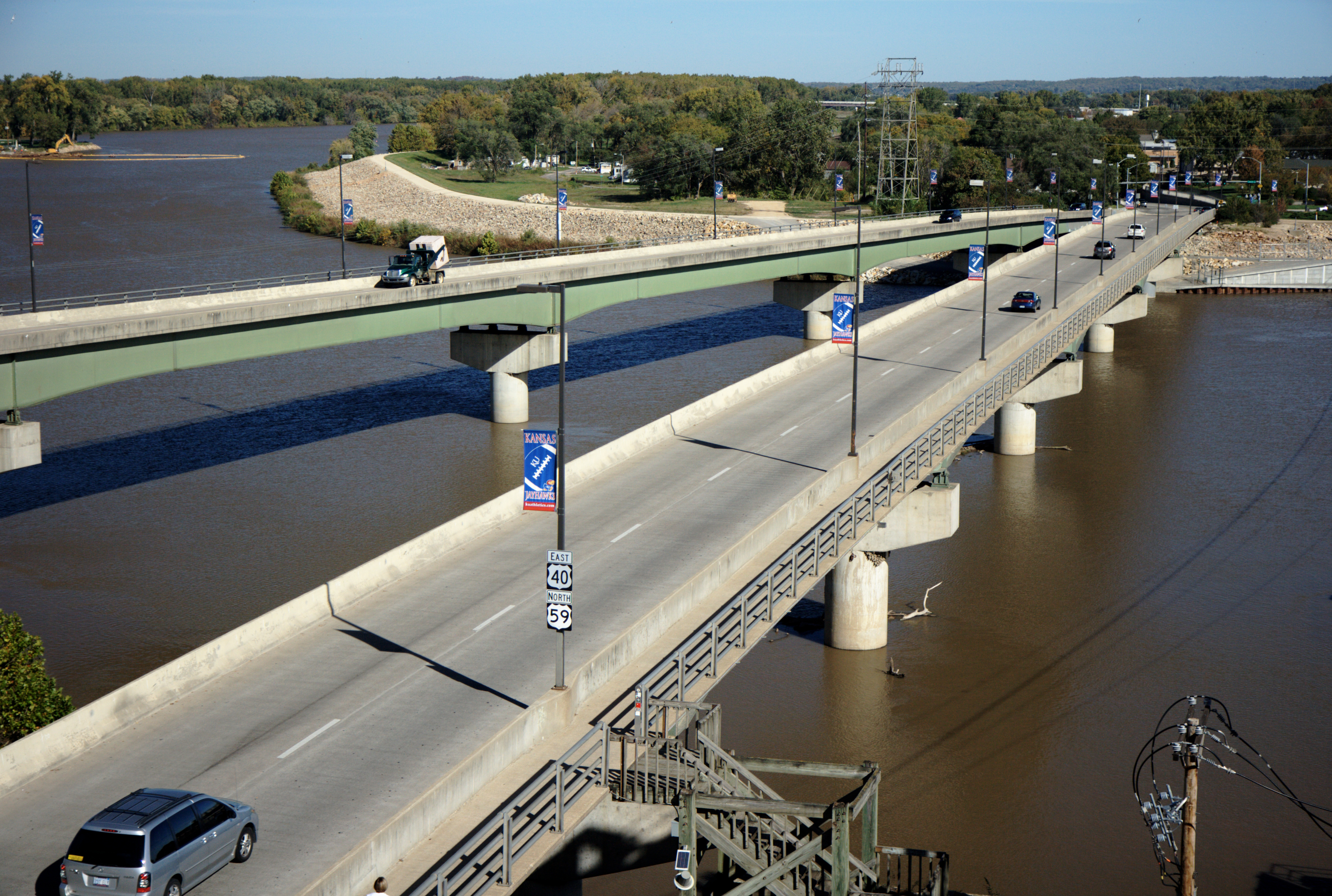
The U.S. 40 and 59 Bridges carry traffic over the Kansas River

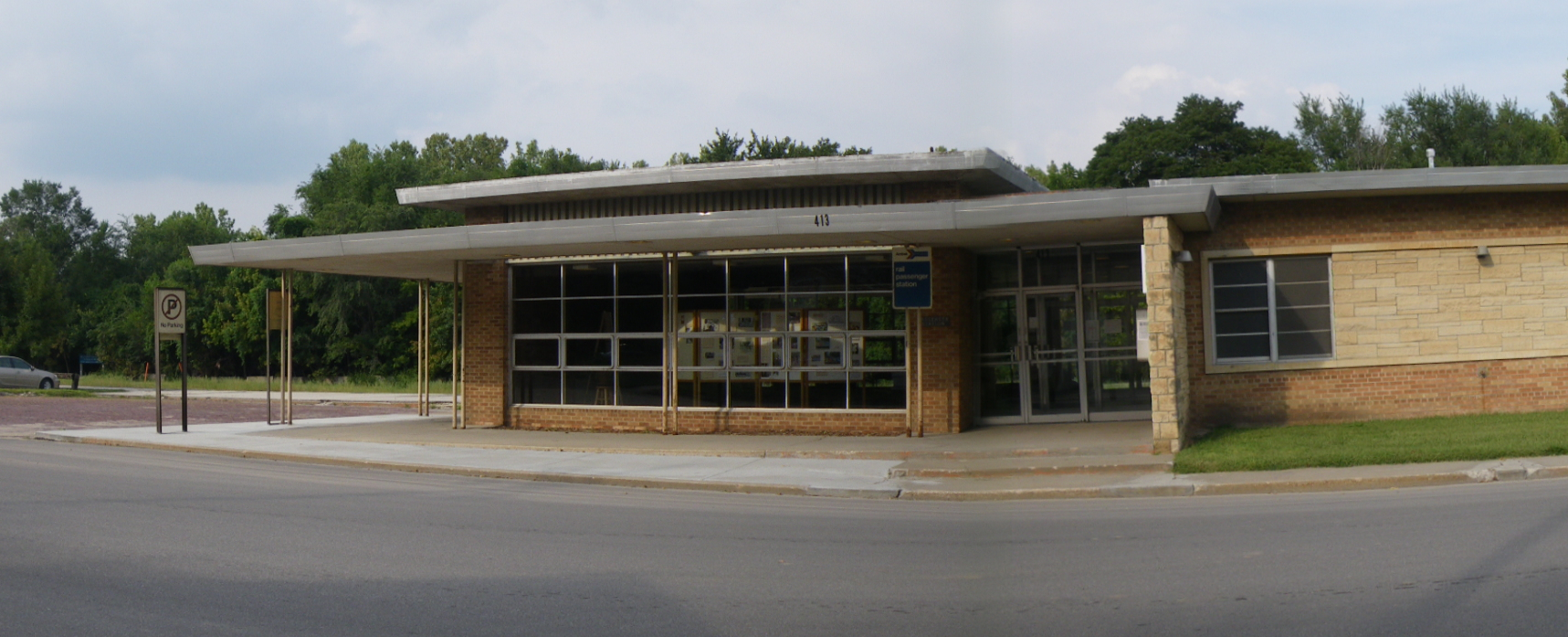
Amtrak station in Lawrence

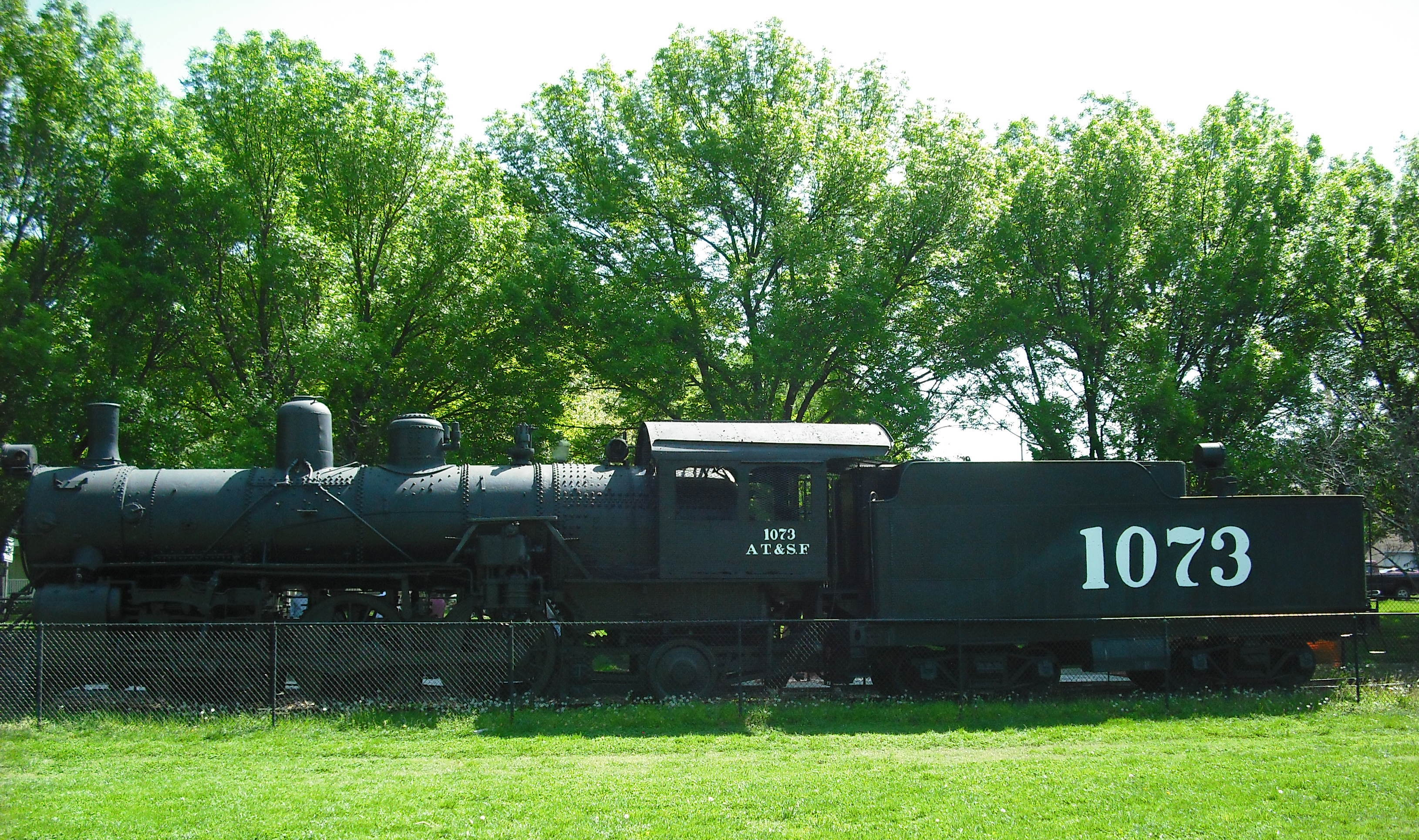
An Atchison, Topeka & Santa Fe locomotive in Watson Park

Interstate 70, as the Kansas Turnpike, runs east–west along the northern edge of the city, interchanging with U.S. Route 59 which runs north–south along North 2nd Street, 6th Street and Iowa Street. Another east–west route, U.S. Route 40, runs through northern Lawrence along 6th Street roughly 2 miles south of I-70. U.S. 40 runs concurrently east–west with U.S. 59 for approximately 1 mile between Iowa Street and Massachusetts Street. The two routes turn north before crossing I-70. One half-mile north of I-70, U.S. 40 splits from U.S. 59 and turns east, running concurrently with U.S. 24, exiting the city.

K–10, an east–west state highway, enters the city from the east at an interchange with 23rd Street. The highway used to head along city streets, however in November 2016, the South Lawrence Trafficway, a four lane divided highway, was connected. This allows traffic to directly flow from the US-59 exit along K–10 into Kansas City. K–10 passes thru the city, starting with the interchange in the far east, with 23rd street, before then continuing west and finally north around western Lawrence, terminating at an interchange with I-70 northwest of the city.

Due to high traffic volume, in 2024, the Kansas Department of Transportation, started a project to turn the two lane two direction K–10 in the west of the city, into a four lane. Once this is complete, K–10 will be fully 4 lanes and divided, for its whole route. This will help with safety and traffic flow, both current problems on the trafficway.

Two bus systems operate in the city. Lawrence Transit, known locally as "The T", is a public bus system operated by the city, and KU on Wheels is operated by the University of Kansas. Together, the two systems operate 18 bus routes in the city. Both systems are free to KU students, faculty, and staff. Greyhound Lines provides intercity bus service with a stop in Lawrence. In addition, the Johnson County, Kansas bus system provides inter-city transport between Lawrence and Overland Park college campuses in a route known as the K–10 Connector.

Lawrence Regional Airport is northeast of the city, immediately north of U.S. 40. Publicly owned, it has two runways and is used for general aviation. The nearest airport with commercial airline service is Kansas City International Airport which is approximately 50 miles northeast of downtown Lawrence. Arival Shuttle provides service from Lawrence to Kansas City International Airport.

Two Class I railroads, BNSF Railway and Union Pacific Railroad (UP), have lines which pass through Lawrence. The BNSF line enters the city from the east and exits to the north, roughly following the course of the Kansas River. The UP line does the same on the north side of the river, running through the city's northeast corner. Using the BNSF trackage, Amtrak provides passenger rail service on its Southwest Chief line between Chicago and Los Angeles. Amtrak's Lawrence station is a few blocks east of downtown.

According to the 2017 American Community Survey, 76.6% of working city of Lawrence residents commuted by driving alone, 8.9% carpooled, 2.6% used public transportation, and 6.0% walked. About 2.0% used all other forms of transportation, including taxicab, motorcycle, and bicycle. About 3.8% of working city of Lawrence residents worked at home. In 2017, 2.5% of city of Lawrence households were without a car. 77.3% of city of Lawrence residents also work in Lawrence.

Lawrence ranked 62nd in the United States for the highest percentage of commuters by bicycle in 2011 at 1.73%.

=== Health and utilities ===
Lawrence has one hospital, the non-profit community-owned Lawrence Memorial Hospital.

The most predominant electric provider is Evergy, and the most predominant gas provider is Black Hills Energy. Midco, Dish Network, and DirecTV are the major television providers. Internet providers include AT&T, Midco, Wicked Broadband, CenturyLink, HughesNet, Allconnect, and ViaSat Satellite. There are numerous telephone service providers in Lawrence, including Midco, AT&T, T-Mobile, Lumen, and others.

Snow removal services are provided by the Lawrence Street Maintenance Division, who is also responsible for maintaining the city's streets, curbs, alleys, and gutters, the Kansas River and Mud Creek levee, some of the infrastructure of the Lawrence Regional Airport, and street sweeping.

== Sister cities ==
Lawrence has four sister cities through Sister Cities International:

- Eutin, Schleswig-Holstein, Germany – October 27, 1989
- Hiratsuka, Kanagawa, Japan – September 21, 1990
- Iniades, Greece – October 20, 2009
- Tocopilla, Chile – July 18, 2024

== In popular culture ==
Lawrence is a setting in the 1983 television movie The Day After, and parts of the movie were filmed in the city.

Sam and Dean Winchester, the protagonists of Supernatural, are from Lawrence, and the city has been referenced numerous times throughout the show's history.

Lawrence was destroyed in the 2006 TV Series Jericho.

American folk singer Josh Ritter's song "Lawrence KS" is on the 2002 album Golden Age of Radio. Cross Canadian Ragweed's 2007 album Mission California features the song "Lawrence", which was inspired by a homeless family the band encountered near Christmas while visiting the town.

Lawrence's Meadowbrook Apartments residential complex is the default starting point for the map program Google Earth. This location was set by Brian McClendon, a 1986 graduate of the University of Kansas and director of engineering for Google Earth, who lived in the complex as a child.

== See also ==
- Great Flood of 1951
- Lied Center of Kansas
- National Register of Historic Places listings in Douglas County, Kansas
