= National Register of Historic Places listings in Douglas County, Kansas =

Location of Douglas County in Kansas

This is a list of the National Register of Historic Places listings in Douglas County, Kansas.

This is intended to be a complete list of the properties and districts on the National Register of Historic Places in Douglas County, Kansas, United States. The locations of National Register properties and districts for which the latitude and longitude coordinates are included below, may be seen in a map.

There are 121 properties and districts listed on the National Register in the county, including 3 National Historic Landmarks. Another property was once listed but has been removed.

This National Park Service list is complete through NPS recent listings posted October 2, 2026.

== Current listings ==
	Name on the Register	Image	Date listed	Location	City or town	Description
1	Ralph and Cloyd Achning House	Ralph and Cloyd Achning House	September 15, 1987 (#87001030)	846 Missouri St. 38°58′04″N 95°14′50″W	Lawrence	
2	Akers House	Akers House	August 12, 2025 (#100012096)	1645 Louisiana Street; 38°57′14″N 95°14′31″W	Lawrence	
3	Knud Anderson Farmstead	Knud Anderson Farmstead	March 21, 2023 (#100008784)	1862 North 700 Rd. 38°50′27″N 95°09′22″W	Vinland vicinity	
4	Appanoose Church of the Brethren and Cemetery	Appanoose Church of the Brethren and Cemetery	September 14, 2018 (#100002965)	492 Woodson & 196 N 1 Rds. 38°44′20″N 95°27′49″W	Overbrook vicinity	The church is in Franklin County and the cemetery is in Douglas County.
5	Bailey Hall	Bailey Hall	October 22, 2001 (#01001122)	Junction of Jayhawk Dr. and Sunflower Rd. 38°57′28″N 95°14′46″W	Lawrence	
6	Baldwin City School and Auditorium-Gymnasium	Baldwin City School and Auditorium-Gymnasium	July 7, 2015 (#15000382)	704 Chapel St. 38°46′49″N 95°11′17″W	Baldwin City	
7	Barnes Apple Barn	Barnes Apple Barn	November 1, 2006 (#06000966)	714 E. 1728 Rd. 38°50′34″N 95°10′53″W	Baldwin City	
8	Barnes-Hoskinson Farmstead	Barnes-Hoskinson Farmstead	July 26, 2023 (#100009179)	715 and 713 East 1728 Rd. 38°50′34″N 95°10′56″W	Vinland vicinity	
9	Bayles Residence		October 5, 2026 (#100013520)	1647 Mississippi Street; 38°57′13″N 95°14′39″W	Lawrence	
10	George Malcom Beal House	George Malcom Beal House	December 29, 2015 (#15000937)	1624 Indiana St. 38°57′15″N 95°14′35″W	Lawrence	
11	George and Annie Bell House	George and Annie Bell House	August 11, 1983 (#83000423)	1008 Ohio St. 38°57′55″N 95°14′25″W	Lawrence	
12	Benedict House	Benedict House	January 22, 1992 (#91001978)	923 Tennessee St. 38°57′59″N 95°14′23″W	Lawrence	
13	Beni Israel Cemetery	Beni Israel Cemetery	January 2, 2013 (#12001118)	1301 East 2100 Road; 38°55′42″N 95°06′45″W	Eudora	
14	Black Jack Battlefield	Black Jack Battlefield	April 28, 2004 (#04000365)	U.S. Route 56 and County Road 2000, 3 miles (4.8 km) east of Baldwin City; 38°45′56″N 95°07′45″W	Baldwin City	National Historic Landmark designation October 16, 2012
15	Col. James Blood House	Col. James Blood House	February 23, 1972 (#72000493)	1015 Tennessee St. 38°57′54″N 95°14′22″W	Lawrence	
16	Breezedale Historic District	Breezedale Historic District	January 31, 2008 (#07001478)	2301-2401 Massachusetts St. 38°56′30″N 95°14′09″W	Lawrence	
17	Case Library	Case Library	June 5, 1986 (#86001232)	Baker University, Eighth and Grove; 38°46′39″N 95°11′20″W	Baldwin City	
18	Chewning House	Chewning House	March 7, 2019 (#100003443)	1510 Stratford Rd. 38°57′42″N 95°15′11″W	Lawrence	
19	Chicken Creek Bridge	Chicken Creek Bridge	March 5, 1990 (#90000298)	Over Chicken Creek, southeast of Lone Star; 38°51′11″N 95°20′35″W	Lone Star	
20	Clearfield School--District 58	Clearfield School--District 58	January 8, 2014 (#13001037)	2162 N. 600 Rd. 38°49′34″N 95°06′02″W	Baldwin City	Part of the Public Schools of Kansas MPS
21	Clinton School District 25	Clinton School District 25	May 1, 1998 (#96001160)	1180 N. 604 East Rd. 38°55′16″N 95°23′24″W	Lawrence	Now the Clinton city hall
22	Coal Creek Library	Coal Creek Library	December 10, 2003 (#03001257)	698 E. 1719 Rd. 38°50′24″N 95°10′57″W	Vinland	
23	Cohn/Gardner-Hill & Company Store	Cohn/Gardner-Hill & Company Store	April 7, 2021 (#100005945)	714 Main St. 38°56′46″N 95°05′56″W	Eudora	
24	Constitution Hall	Constitution Hall	May 14, 1971 (#71000312)	Elmore St. between Woodson and 3rd Sts. 39°02′44″N 95°23′40″W	Lecompton	
25	Double Hyperbolic Paraboloid House	Double Hyperbolic Paraboloid House	June 27, 2007 (#07000605)	934 W. 21st. St. 38°56′47″N 95°14′48″W	Lawrence	
26	Douglas County Courthouse	Douglas County Courthouse	April 14, 1975 (#75000708)	Southeastern corner of Massachusetts and 11th Sts. 38°57′48″N 95°14′07″W	Lawrence	
27	Charles Duncan House	Charles Duncan House	June 5, 1986 (#86001215)	933 Tennessee St. 38°57′58″N 95°14′23″W	Lawrence	
28	Dyche Hall, University of Kansas	Dyche Hall, University of Kansas	July 14, 1974 (#74000829)	14th St. and Oread Ave., University of Kansas campus 38°57′31″N 95°14′38″W	Lawrence	
29	East Lawrence Industrial Historic District	East Lawrence Industrial Historic District	December 11, 2007 (#07001250)	619 E. 8th St., 804-846 Pennsylvania St., and 716 E. 9th St.; also 620 East 8th Street; 38°58′07″N 95°13′44″W	Lawrence	Second set of addresses represent a boundary increase approved October 11, 2022.
30	Eldridge House Hotel	Eldridge House Hotel	December 1, 1986 (#86003278)	Seventh and Massachusetts Sts. 38°58′17″N 95°14′05″W	Lawrence	
31	Elmwood Stock Farm Barn	Elmwood Stock Farm Barn	May 11, 2022 (#100007704)	571 East 1000 Rd. 38°49′19″N 95°19′02″W	Baldwin City	
32	English Lutheran Church	English Lutheran Church	July 28, 1995 (#95000945)	1040 New Hampshire St. 38°57′34″N 95°13′41″W	Lawrence	
33	Fernand-Strong House	Fernand-Strong House	July 2, 2008 (#08000614)	1515 University Dr. 38°57′38″N 95°15′11″W	Lawrence	
34	First Methodist Church of Eudora	First Methodist Church of Eudora	September 3, 2024 (#100009704)	703 Church Street; 38°56′47″N 95°05′46″W	Eudora	
35	First Methodist Episcopal Church	First Methodist Episcopal Church	August 12, 2025 (#100012097)	704 8th Street; 38°46′33″N 95°11′19″W	Baldwin City	
36	First Methodist Episcopal Church	First Methodist Episcopal Church	March 14, 2019 (#100003446)	946 Vermont St. 38°57′57″N 95°14′14″W	Lawrence	
37	First Presbyterian Church	First Presbyterian Church	March 11, 2024 (#100010035)	2415 Clinton Parkway; 38°56′33″N 95°15′52″W	Lawrence	
38	Fox House	Fox House	April 13, 2026 (#100012907)	739 Connecticut Street; 38°58′12″N 95°13′57″W	Lawrence	
39	Charles & Elizabeth Haskell French House	Charles & Elizabeth Haskell French House	October 9, 2012 (#12000844)	1300 Haskell Ave. 38°57′35″N 95°13′22″W	Lawrence	
40	Friends' Place	Friends' Place	January 21, 2025 (#100011114)	1500 Learnard Avenue; 38°57′23″N 95°13′50″W	Lawrence	
41	Eugene F. Goodrich House	Eugene F. Goodrich House	October 21, 2001 (#01001123)	1711 Massachusetts St. 38°57′10″N 95°14′11″W	Lawrence	
42	Green Hall, University of Kansas	Green Hall, University of Kansas	July 15, 1974 (#74000830)	Jayhawk Dr. 38°57′29″N 95°14′40″W	Lawrence	Lippencott Hall since 1979
43	Michael D. Greenlee House	Michael D. Greenlee House	February 20, 2004 (#03001387)	947 Louisiana St. 38°58′01″N 95°14′36″W	Lawrence	
44	Andrew Jackson (A.J.) and Mary Carrol Griffin House	Andrew Jackson (A.J.) and Mary Carrol Griffin House	March 17, 2022 (#100007021)	645 Connecticut St. 38°58′17″N 95°13′57″W	Lawrence	
45	Hancock (12th Street) Historic District	Hancock (12th Street) Historic District	July 21, 2004 (#04000726)	Roughly along W. 12th St., from Oread Ave. to Mississippi St. 38°57′42″N 95°14′39″W	Lawrence	
46	Haskell Institute	Haskell Institute	October 15, 1966 (#66000342)	Southern end of Barker Ave. 38°56′19″N 95°14′00″W	Lawrence	
47	William Henry House	William Henry House	September 30, 2019 (#100004448)	344 N. 1925 Rd. 39°01′03″N 95°26′23″W	Lecompton	
48	Holy Family Catholic Church	Holy Family Catholic Church	October 2, 2020 (#100005623)	311 East 9th St. 38°56′37″N 95°05′45″W	Eudora	
49	Edward House House	Edward House House	April 18, 2007 (#07000316)	1646 Massachusetts St. 38°57′13″N 95°14′08″W	Lawrence	
50	Johnson Block Historic District		March 14, 2019 (#100003445)	E. side of 800 blk. Arkansas St. and W. side of 800 blk. of Missouri St. 38°58′07″N 95°14′57″W	Lawrence	
51	Kansas Homestead of Thomas McQuill(i)an	Kansas Homestead of Thomas McQuill(i)an	June 28, 2021 (#100006683)	1320 North 150 Rd. 38°45′38″N 95°15′24″W	Baldwin City vicinity	
52	Kibbee Farmstead	Kibbee Farmstead	April 16, 2013 (#13000165)	1500 Haskell Ave. 38°57′24″N 95°13′20″W	Lawrence	
53	Klock's Grocery & Independent Laundry	Klock's Grocery & Independent Laundry	July 12, 2019 (#100004200)	900 Mississippi St. 38°58′02″N 95°14′38″W	Lawrence	
54	Lane University	Lane University	March 24, 1971 (#71000313)	Eastern side of Lecompton; 39°02′42″N 95°23′29″W	Lecompton	Now the Territorial Capital Museum
55	Lawrence's Downtown Historic District	Lawrence's Downtown Historic District	July 15, 2004 (#04000685)	Generally along Massachusetts St. between 6th Ave. and S. Park St. 38°57′59″N 95°14′10″W	Lawrence	
56	Lewis-Crowder Cemetery	Lewis-Crowder Cemetery	April 13, 2026 (#100012906)	965 N 1950 Rd; 39°01′20″N 95°24′37″W	Lecompton vicinity	
57	Lone Star Lake Dam	Lone Star Lake Dam	October 17, 2023 (#100009456)	660 E 665 Rd; 38°50′25″N 95°22′50″W	Lawrence vicinity	
58	Lone Star Lake Civilian Conservation Corps (CCC) Camp	Lone Star Lake Civilian Conservation Corps (CCC) Camp	November 17, 2023 (#100009545)	660 E 665 Rd; 38°50′25″N 95°22′49″W	Lawrence vicinity	
59	Ludington House	Ludington House	May 14, 1971 (#71000310)	1613 Tennessee St. 38°57′15″N 95°14′23″W	Lawrence	
60	George K. Mackie House	George K. Mackie House	July 8, 2009 (#09000497)	1941 Massachusetts St. 38°56′58″N 95°14′09″W	Lawrence	
61	James and Pearl Malin House		November 19, 2024 (#100011034)	1541 University Drive; 38°57′38″N 95°15′14″W	Lawrence	
62	Marion Springs School	Marion Springs School	September 14, 2018 (#100002963)	316 E 900 Rd. 38°47′02″N 95°20′06″W	Baldwin City	
63	Handel T. Martin House	Handel T. Martin House	October 8, 2014 (#14000830)	1709 Louisiana St. 38°57′12″N 95°14′30″W	Lawrence	
64	Witter S. McCurdy House	Witter S. McCurdy House	October 21, 2001 (#01001124)	909 W. 6th St. 38°58′22″N 95°14′45″W	Lawrence	
65	Robert H. Miller House	Robert H. Miller House	June 14, 1984 (#84001235)	1111 E. 19th St. 38°56′59″N 95°13′16″W	Lawrence	
66	Dr. Frederic D. Morse House	Dr. Frederic D. Morse House	April 18, 1991 (#91000469)	1041 Tennessee St. 38°57′52″N 95°14′20″W	Lawrence	
67	Mugan-Olmstead House		March 27, 2017 (#100000796)	819 Avalon Rd. 38°58′08″N 95°15′15″W	Lawrence	
68	Ninth Street Missionary Baptist Church	Ninth Street Missionary Baptist Church	July 19, 2024 (#100010526)	847 Ohio Street; 38°58′04″N 95°14′27″W	Lawrence	
69	North Rhode Island Street Historic Residential District	North Rhode Island Street Historic Residential District	July 14, 2004 (#04000686)	700-1144, 901-1047, 1201-1215 Rhode Island St. 38°57′41″N 95°14′00″W	Lawrence	
70	Oak Hill Cemetery	Oak Hill Cemetery	July 10, 2017 (#100001287)	1605 Oak Hill Ave. 38°57′31″N 95°12′44″W	Lawrence	
71	Old Castle Hall	Old Castle Hall	February 24, 1971 (#71000309)	513 5th St. 38°46′38″N 95°11′04″W	Baldwin City	
72	Old Lawrence City Hall	Old Lawrence City Hall	February 24, 1971 (#71000311)	1047 Massachusetts St. 38°57′51″N 95°14′09″W	Lawrence	Built 1885-88 for Watkins National Bank; city hall, 1929-1970; Watkins Community Museum since 1975.
73	Old Lawrence City Library	Old Lawrence City Library	February 18, 1975 (#75000709)	Northwestern corner of 9th and Vermont Sts. 38°58′04″N 95°14′15″W	Lawrence	
74	Old West Lawrence Historic District	Old West Lawrence Historic District	February 23, 1972 (#72000494)	Bounded roughly by Tennessee, 8th, Indiana, and 6th Sts. 38°58′15″N 95°14′27″W	Lawrence	
75	Oread Historic District	Oread Historic District	October 10, 2007 (#07001064)	Roughly between W. 9th & 12th Sts., and the alleys behind Louisiana & Kentucky Sts. 38°57′54″N 95°14′24″W	Lawrence	
76	Oregon-California Trail Segments	Oregon-California Trail Segments	April 5, 2015 (#16000132)	867 U.S. Route 40, and other areas near US 40; 38°58′12″N 95°20′27″W	Lawrence	Boundary increase and renaming approved January 20, 2022
77	John and Anna O'Sullivan Farmstead	John and Anna O'Sullivan Farmstead	June 29, 2018 (#100002623)	710 E 100 Rd. 38°50′30″N 95°28′55″W	Overbrook	
78	Parmenter Memorial Hall	Parmenter Memorial Hall	September 19, 1977 (#77000579)	8th and Dearborn Sts. 38°46′42″N 95°11′15″W	Baldwin City	
79	Charles Pilla House	Charles Pilla House	September 6, 1974 (#74000828)	615 Elm St. 38°56′52″N 95°05′53″W	Eudora	
80	Pinckney I Historic District	Pinckney I Historic District	July 15, 2004 (#04000688)	Roughly bounded by W. 5th St., Tennessee St., W. 6th St., and Louisiana St., with 501-533 Louisiana St. and 444-445 W. St. 38°58′27″N 95°14′30″W	Lawrence	
81	Pinckney II Historic District	Pinckney II Historic District	July 15, 2004 (#04000689)	Roughly bounded by W. 3rd St., Louisiana St., W. 4th St. and Mississippi St. 38°58′39″N 95°14′40″W	Lawrence	
82	Plymouth Congregational Church	Plymouth Congregational Church	September 2, 2009 (#09000674)	925 Vermont Street; 38°58′00″N 95°14′13″W	Lawrence	
83	Priestly House	Priestly House	March 10, 1988 (#88000199)	1505 Kentucky St. 38°57′26″N 95°14′18″W	Lawrence	
84	William A. Quayle House	William A. Quayle House	February 2, 1995 (#94001624)	210 N. 6th St. 38°47′04″N 95°11′07″W	Baldwin City	
85	Reuter Organ Company Buildings	Reuter Organ Company Buildings	December 21, 2020 (#100005946)	612-616 New Hampshire St. 38°58′21″N 95°14′05″W	Lawrence	
86	Samuel A. Riggs House	Samuel A. Riggs House	August 29, 1977 (#77000580)	1500 Pennsylvania St. 38°57′24″N 95°13′43″W	Lawrence	
87	Roberts-Luther-Mitchell House		May 9, 2022 (#100007703)	1313 Massachusetts St. 38°57′34″N 95°14′10″W	Lawrence	
88	John N. Roberts House	John N. Roberts House	September 6, 1974 (#74000831)	1307 Massachusetts St. 38°57′36″N 95°14′11″W	Lawrence	Also known as the Castle Tea Room
89	St. Luke African Methodist Episcopal Church	St. Luke African Methodist Episcopal Church	November 15, 2005 (#05001240)	900 New York St. 38°58′03″N 95°13′50″W	Lawrence	
90	Santa Fe Depot	Santa Fe Depot	January 3, 1983 (#83000424)	1601 High St. 38°46′29″N 95°12′02″W	Baldwin City	
91	Santa Fe Depot	Santa Fe Depot	January 5, 2018 (#100001946)	413 E 7th St. 38°58′16″N 95°13′50″W	Lawrence	Mid-Century Modern train station
92	Santa Fe Trail-Douglas County Trail Segments	Santa Fe Trail-Douglas County Trail Segments	November 4, 2002 (#02001262)	U.S. Route 56, 2.5 miles (4.0 km) east of Baldwin City; 38°46′01″N 95°07′46″W	Baldwin City	
93	Snow House	Snow House	September 9, 1996 (#96000947)	706 W. 12th St. 38°57′44″N 95°13′54″W	Lawrence	
94	South Rhode Island and New Hampshire Street Historic Residential District	South Rhode Island and New Hampshire Street Historic Residential District	July 14, 2004 (#04000687)	1120-1340 E. Rhode Island St; 1301-1345 W. Rhode Island St.; 1300-1346 E. New Hampshire St.; 1301-1347 W. New Hampshire St. 38°57′35″N 95°14′01″W	Lawrence	
95	Sowers-Crawford Farms Historic District	Sowers-Crawford Farms Historic District	October 10, 2023 (#100009424)	624 and 646 North 100 Rd. 38°45′13″N 95°23′10″W	Overbrook vicinity	
96	Spooner Hall, University of Kansas	Spooner Hall, University of Kansas	July 15, 1974 (#74000832)	14th St. and Oread Ave. on the University of Kansas campus 38°57′30″N 95°14′48″W	Lawrence	
97	Star Cash Grocery Store and Residence	Star Cash Grocery Store and Residence	September 30, 2019 (#100004449)	696 E1719 Rd. 38°50′24″N 95°10′58″W	Baldwin City	
98	Judge Nelson T. Stephens House	Judge Nelson T. Stephens House	February 19, 1982 (#82002655)	340 N. Michigan St. 38°59′23″N 95°14′56″W	Lawrence	
99	Stoebener Barn	Stoebener Barn	January 9, 1989 (#88003083)	Southwest of Worden; 38°46′23″N 95°20′52″W	Baldwin City	
100	Stony Point Evangelical Lutheran Church	Stony Point Evangelical Lutheran Church	December 20, 2006 (#06001168)	1575 N. 600 Rd. 38°49′30″N 95°12′38″W	Baldwin City	
101	Strong Hall	Strong Hall	September 18, 1998 (#98001174)	213 Strong Hall, University of Kansas, at the junction of Jayhawk Dr. and Poplar Ln. 38°57′35″N 95°14′48″W	Lawrence	
102	Lucy Hobbs Taylor Building	Lucy Hobbs Taylor Building	February 19, 1982 (#82002656)	809 Vermont; 38°58′05″N 95°14′17″W	Lawrence	
103	Thomas House		August 5, 2026 (#100012119)	1904 Meadowlark Lane; 38°56′59″N 95°16′12″W	Lawrence	
104	Trail Park and Trail Park DAR Marker	Trail Park and Trail Park DAR Marker	July 17, 2013 (#13000486)	NW. jct. of E 1700 & N 400 Rds. 38°47′28″N 95°11′12″W	Baldwin City	Santa Fe Trail Multiple Property Submission
105	Trinity Lutheran Historic District	Trinity Lutheran Historic District	January 25, 2024 (#100009777)	1245 New Hampshire Street; 38°57′36″N 95°14′05″W	Lawrence	
106	United Presbyterian Center	United Presbyterian Center	September 29, 2009 (#09000350)	1204 Oread Ave. 38°57′38″N 95°14′34″W	Lawrence	
107	University of Kansas East Historic District	University of Kansas East Historic District	January 8, 2014 (#13001038)	Roughly bounded by Oread and Sunnyside Aves., Jayhawk Boulevard, Lilac Ln., Pearson Pl., and Louisiana and W. 13th Sts. 38°57′27″N 95°14′34″W	Lawrence	
108	University of Kansas Historic District	University of Kansas Historic District	April 16, 2013 (#13000167)	Roughly bounded by W. Campus Rd., the southern edge of Jayhawk Boulevard, Sunnyside Ave., Lilac Ln., Oread Ave., and W. 13th St. 38°57′29″N 95°14′52″W	Lawrence	
109	Upper Wakarusa River Crossing	Upper Wakarusa River Crossing	January 8, 2014 (#13001039)	1180 E. 1400 Rd. 38°54′35″N 95°14′13″W	Lawrence	
110	John Palmer Usher House	John Palmer Usher House	March 7, 1975 (#75000710)	1425 Tennessee St. 38°57′27″N 95°14′23″W	Lawrence	
111	US Post Office-Lawrence	US Post Office-Lawrence	October 31, 2002 (#02001265)	645 New Hampshire; 38°58′17″N 95°14′06″W	Lawrence	Now offices of The World Company and the Lawrence Journal-World
112	Vermilya-Boener House	Vermilya-Boener House	January 24, 1992 (#91001961)	Northwest of junction of U.S. Routes 24, 40, and 59; 39°00′56″N 95°14′33″W	Lawrence	
113	Vinland Fair Association Fairgrounds	Vinland Fair Association Fairgrounds	July 26, 2023 (#100009180)	1736 N. 700 Rd. 38°50′31″N 95°10′44″W	Vinland	
114	Vinland Fair Association Fairgrounds Exhibit Building	Vinland Fair Association Fairgrounds Exhibit Building	January 23, 2004 (#03001466)	1736 N. 700 Rd. 38°50′34″N 95°09′59″W	Vinland	
115	Vinland Grange Hall	Vinland Grange Hall	February 10, 2000 (#00000037)	Junction of Oak and Main Sts. 38°50′21″N 95°10′56″W	Vinland	
116	Vinland Presbyterian Church	Vinland Presbyterian Church	August 4, 2003 (#03000707)	697 E. 1725 Rd. 38°50′25″N 95°10′56″W	Vinland	
117	Henry Waters House		January 4, 2023 (#100008522)	Address Restricted	Lawrence vicinity	
118	Willow Springs Santa Fe Trail Segment and DAR Marker	Willow Springs Santa Fe Trail Segment and DAR Marker	September 21, 2018 (#100002964)	N 550 & E 1100 Rds. 38°49′08″N 95°17′52″W	Baldwin City vicinity	
119	Winter School No. 70	Winter School No. 70	December 22, 2020 (#100005947)	744 North 1800 Rd. 39°00′02″N 95°21′52″W	Lecompton vicinity	
120	Zimmerman Steel Company	Zimmerman Steel Company	April 1, 2021 (#100006322)	701 E 19th St. 38°57′00″N 95°13′36″W	Lawrence	
121	S.T. Zimmerman House	S.T. Zimmerman House	September 6, 1974 (#74000833)	304 Indiana St. 38°58′44″N 95°13′52″W	Lawrence	

== Former listing ==
	Name on the Register	Image	Date listed	Date removed	Location	City or town	Description
1	J.C. Steele House		August 7, 1974 (#74000827)	April 9, 1982	1 mi. east of Clinton; 38°54′35″N 95°22′13″W	Clinton	Built in 1866. Despite plans to renovate the house, it was demolished in 1981. Only the foundation and front stairs remain.

== See also ==
- List of National Historic Landmarks in Kansas
- National Register of Historic Places listings in Kansas
