= First Congregational Church (Manhattan, Kansas) =

Historic church in Kansas, United States

- U.S. National Register of Historic Places
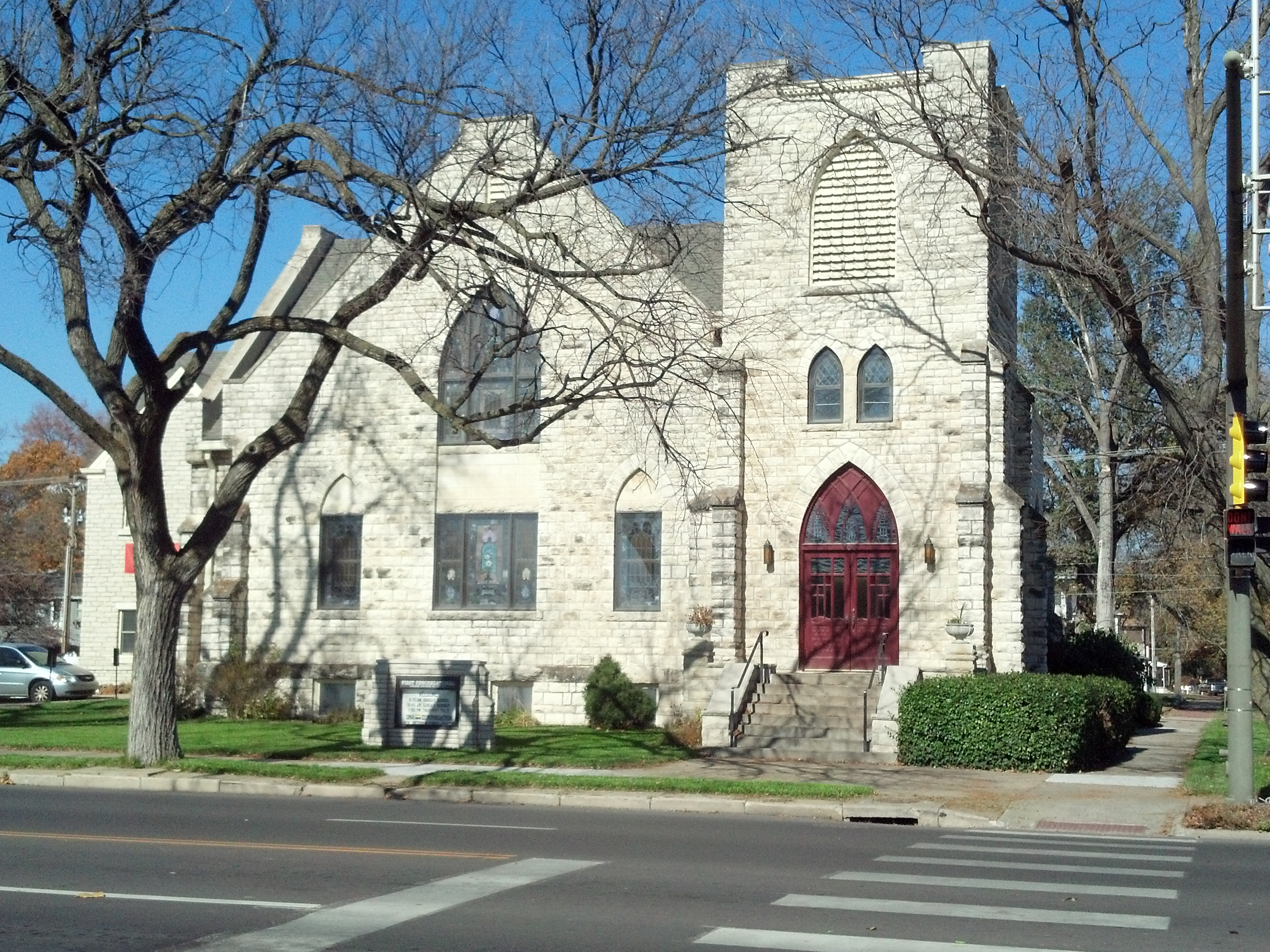

- Location within Kansas Location within the United States
- Location: 700 Poyntz Avenue, Manhattan, Kansas
- Coordinates: 39°10′53″N 96°34′2″W
- Area: less than one acre
- Built: 1859
- Architectural style: Late Gothic Revival
- NRHP reference No.: 08001068
- Added to NRHP: November 13, 2008

First Congregational United Church of Christ is a historic church at 700 Poyntz Avenue in Manhattan, Kansas. It is listed on the National Register of Historic Places as First Congregational Church.

On April 22, 1855, the Rev. Charles Blood conducted a worship service in the vicinity of the present church property. The sanctuary was a tent, a trunk served as the pulpit, and worshippers were seated on boxes and kegs. The text for the sermon was from the Acts of the Apostles: "Those who have turned the world upside down have come hither, also."

The Rev. Blood was an abolitionist preacher educated at Lane Theological Seminary, Cincinnati, Ohio, so the text was certainly appropriate. In subsequent months, services were held in the tent, then in a log cabin, in private homes, in a store building, and then in a new school building on Poyntz Avenue west of Ninth Street. Such was the beginning of the second Congregational church in the Kansas Territory.

On January 6, 1856, the fledgling church was officially established by the adoption of a constitution. There were 12 charter members. Soon after, talk of a building began. The Manhattan town companies gave three lots to the church for the erection of a building along with 40 additional lots to be sold to finance the building project.

In 1858, the original stone church was begun. Donors to its construction included Owen Lovejoy, Stephen A. Douglas, and Abraham Lincoln. The church was nearly finished in May 1859 when a tornado destroyed the roof, but repairs proceeded quickly. On July 24, 1859, the building was dedicated. The Rev. Richard Cordley of Plymouth Church, Lawrence, was the guest preacher, and Mrs. Blood wrote a hymn for the occasion titled "O Thou Glorious Sovereign Lord." The hymn was also used that same year at the laying of the cornerstone of Blue Mont Central College, which was the predecessor to Kansas State University.

Today, that first building still serves the congregation as Pioneer Hall. Weekly worship continues there, now in the Taizé tradition. It is the oldest Protestant church building in Kansas still in use by its original congregation.

There have been many additions to the original building over the years—notably the present Sanctuary constructed in 1904 and completely renovated in 2000, and a 1990 addition including new offices, meeting space, restrooms, and kitchen.

In 2000 the congregation called an openly gay man as pastor (the first in the State of Kansas), in 2003 the congregation unanimously adopted an Open and Affirming Statement, and in 2014 it enthusiastically called the Rev. Caela Simmons Wood as Pastor, the first woman to hold that office in the congregation's history.

First Congregational UCC was added to the National Register of Historic Places in 2008.
