= Zimmerman House =

Zimmerman House may refer to:

in the United States (by state then city)

- Ellwood-Zimmerman House (Brentwood, Los Angeles, California), designed by modernist architect Craig Ellwood
- S.T. Zimmerman House, Lawrence, Kansas, NRHP-listed
- Williams-Warren-Zimmerman House, Terre Haute, Indiana, NRHP-listed
- Zimmerman House (Manchester, New Hampshire), a Frank Lloyd Wright-designed house, NRHP-listed
- Zimmerman House (Horseheads, New York), NRHP-listed
- Heyne-Zimmerman House, Columbus, Ohio, NRHP-listed in Columbus
- Mead-Zimmerman House, Greenwich, Ohio, NRHP-listed in Huron County, Ohio
- Ezekiel B. Zimmerman Octagon House, Marshallville, Ohio, NRHP-listed
- Jacob Zimmerman House, Gresham, Oregon, NRHP-listed
- Walter S. Zimmerman House, Portland, Oregon, NRHP-listed
- Zimmerman-Rudeen House, Portland, Oregon, NRHP-listed
- Marie Zimmermann Farm, Milford, Pennsylvania, NRHP-listed
- Daniel B. Zimmerman Mansion, Somerset, Pennsylvania, NRHP-listed
- Zimmerman House (Columbia, South Carolina), NRHP-listed
- Minnie Zulch Zimmerman House, Bryan, Texas, NRHP-listed in Brazos County, Texas
