= Lawrence Hospital =

Lawrence Hospital may refer to:

- Lawrence Hospital (Massachusetts), a hospital in Lawrence, Massachusetts
- NewYork-Presbyterian Westchester, a hospital in Bronxville, New York, formerly named Lawrence Hospital
- Lawrence + Memorial Hospital, a hospital in New London, Connecticut
- Lawrence Memorial Hospital (Kansas), a hospital in Lawrence, Kansas
