= Lawrence's Downtown Historic District =

Historic district in Kansas, United States

- U.S. National Register of Historic Places
- U.S. Historic district
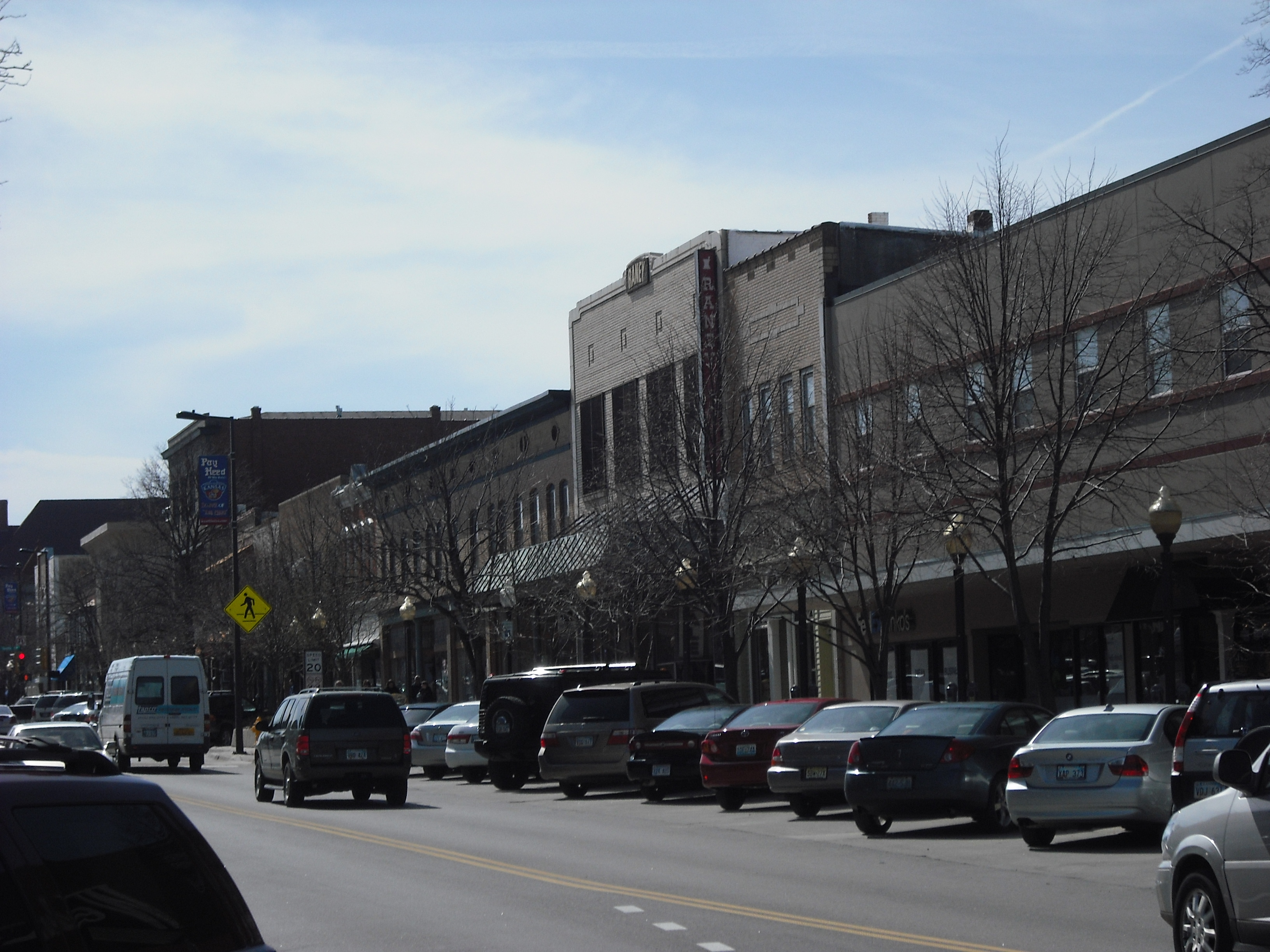

- Location within Kansas Location within the United States
- Location: Generally along Massachusetts St. bet. 6th Ave. and S. park St., Lawrence, Kansas
- Area: 48.1 acres (19.5 ha)
- Architect: Cobb & Froutt; et al.
- Architectural style: Late Victorian, Late 19th And 20th Century Revivals
- MPS: Lawrence, Kansas MPS
- NRHP reference No.: 04000685
- Added to NRHP: July 15, 2004

Lawrence's Downtown Historic District comprises the commercial core of Lawrence, Kansas. The district comprises areas along Massachusetts Street between 6th Street and South Park Street. Nearly all of the contributing structures are masonry commercial buildings, typically with display windows at street level and smaller windows at upper levels. Four properties are individually listed on the National Register of Historic Places: Old Lawrence City Hall, the old Douglas County Courthouse, the Eldridge House Hotel, and the US Post Office-Lawrence. The district includes a total of 136 resources, 99 of which are considered to contribute to the district.

The historic district was placed on the National Register of Historic Places on July 15, 2004.
