= Frederick C. Gunn =

American architect (1865–1959)

Frederick C. Gunn was an American architect. In the firm of Gunn & Curtiss with Louis Singleton Curtiss he helped design several county courthouses.

Gunn was born in Atchison, Kansas, in 1865 and grew up there until his family moved to Kansas City, Missouri when he was 14. Gunn's father, Otis B. Gunn, was a railroad engineer and state senator who volunteered to serve in the fourth Volunteer Kansas regiment in the Union Army during the American Civil War and served on governor Charles Robinson's staff.

Gunn graduated from Rensselaer Polytechnic Institute in Troy, New York, in 1873. He married Winifred Bert of Michigan.

He formed a partnership with Curtiss in 1889 and their firm Gunn & Curtiss produced at least a dozen significant buildings over the next ten years, after which he was in business alone.

From 1892 to 1894 Gunn served on the Kansas City, Missouri City Council, representing the Third Ward as a Democrat. He died in 1959; the State Historical Society of Missouri has a collection of his and his family's papers.

== Selected works ==
- Douglas County Courthouse (Lawrence, Kansas, 1903–1904) Gunn in association with John G. Haskell
- Chapel of the Veterans (Leavenworth, Kansas, 1892-1893) Curtis & Gunn
- Gage County Courthouse (Beatrice, Nebraska, 1890)
- Tarrant County Courthouse (Fort Worth, Texas, 1893–1895)
- Saline County County Courthouse, Salina, Kansas
- Missouri State Building for the 1893 World's Columbian Exposition in Chicago and the Progress Club House.
- Oak Hall for William Rockhill Nelson with F. E. Hill
- General Hospital No. 1 and 2
- City Market (1938)
- Jackson County Court House (1934), supervising architect
- Mercantile Building
- Headquarters of the Church of the Nazarene
- Rock Island Court House
