= Senator Gunn (disambiguation) =

James Gunn (1753–1801) was a U.S. Senator from Georgia from 1789 to 1801. Senator Gunn may also refer to:

- James Gunn (Idaho politician) (1843–1911), Idaho State Senate
- Julien Gunn (1877–1948), Virginia State Senate
- Levi J. Gunn (1830–1916), Massachusetts State Senate
- Otis B. Gunn (1828–1901), Kansas State Senate
- Rick Gunn (born 1958), North Carolina State Senate
