= Gage County Courthouse =

- U.S. National Register of Historic Places
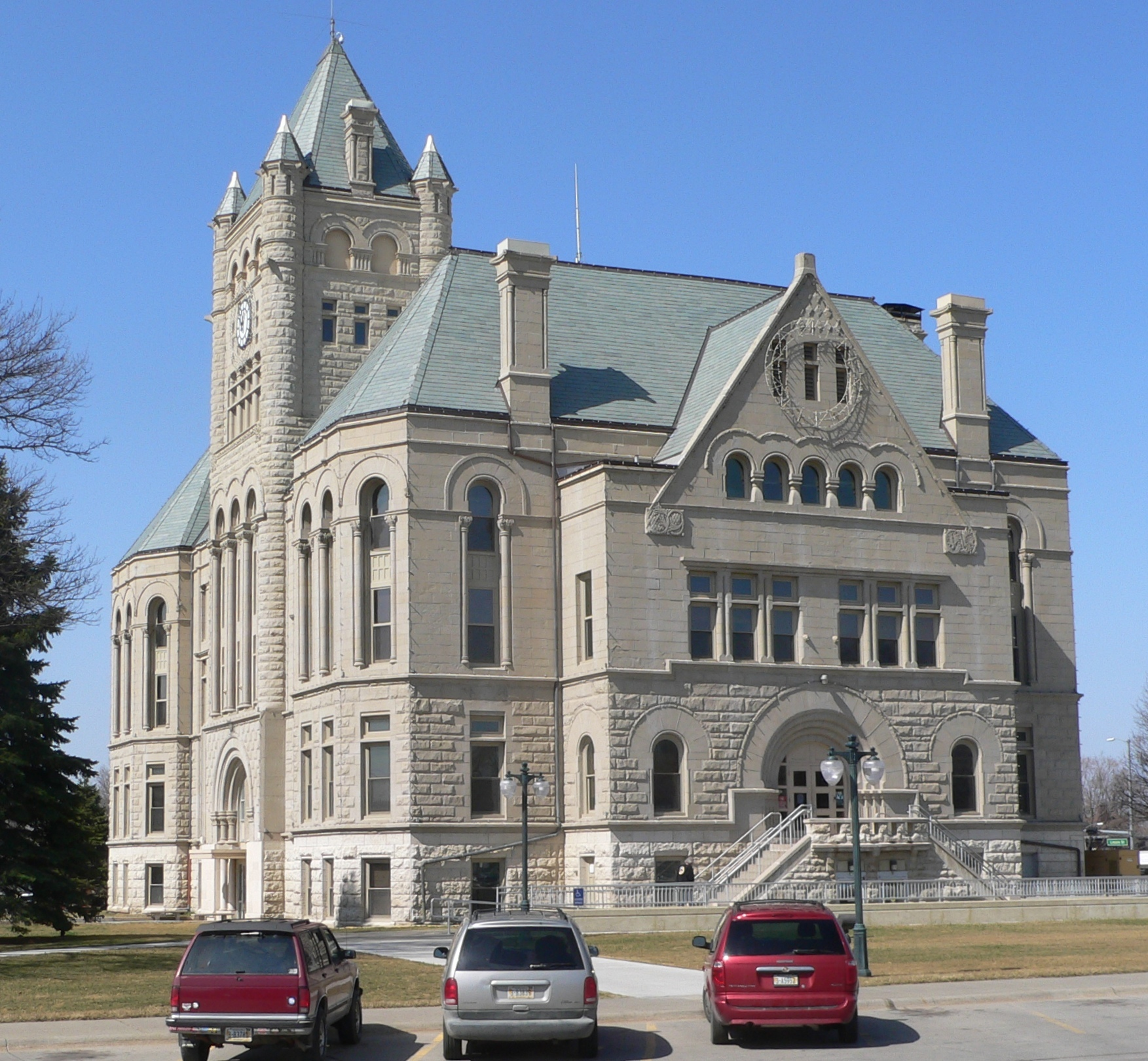

- Location within Nebraska Location within the United States
- Location: 612 Grant St., Beatrice, Nebraska
- Coordinates: 40°16′16″N 96°44′45″W
- Area: 3 acres (1.2 ha)
- Built: 1890
- Architect: Gunn & Curtis
- Architectural style: Romanesque, Richardsonian Romanesque
- MPS: County Courthouses of Nebraska MPS
- NRHP reference No.: 89002226
- Added to NRHP: January 10, 1990

Gage County Courthouse is a historic courthouse for Gage County, Nebraska at 612 Grant Street in the county seat Beatrice, Nebraska. It was listed on the National Register of Historic Places on January 10, 1990.

The building was designed by Gunn and Curtiss (Frederick C. Gunn and Louis Singleton Curtiss) and M.T. Murphy was the building contractor. It was built from 1890 until 1892 in a Richardsonian Romanesque architectural style. It was renovated in 2008.
