= McPherson County Courthouse (Kansas) =

- U.S. National Register of Historic Places
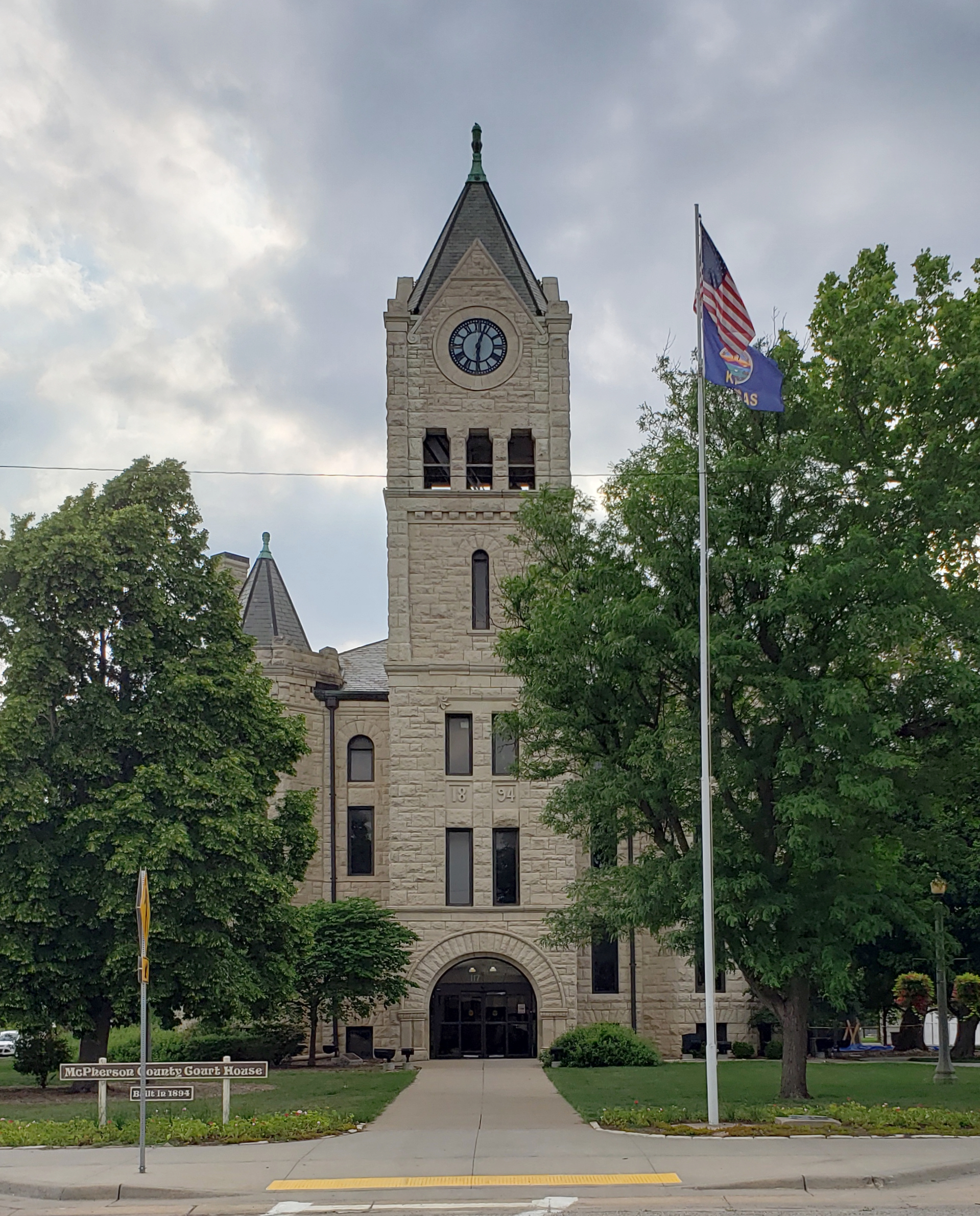

- Location within Kansas Location within the United States
- Interactive map showing the location of McPherson County Courthouse
- Location: Maple and Kansas Aves., McPherson, Kansas
- Coordinates: 38°22′12″N 97°40′7″W
- Area: 1 acre (0.40 ha)
- Built: 1893
- Architect: John G. Haskell
- Architectural style: Richardsonian Romanesque
- NRHP reference No.: 76002264
- Added to NRHP: November 21, 1976

The McPherson County Courthouse in McPherson, Kansas is a historic three-story courthouse that was built in 1893. It was added to the National Historic Register in 1976.

It was designed by architect John G. Haskell. The building was built in 1893.

It is Richardsonian Romanesque in style and is built of Cottonwood Limestone from quarries near Strong City in Chase County. It is 104 feet (32 m) by 71 feet (22 m) in plan. It has a square central bell and clock tower which rises to 105 feet (32 m). The main entrance of the courthouse is in the base of the tower and features a Syrian arch.
