= List of mayors of Lawrence, Kansas =

Lawrence, Kansas mayors

The following is a list of mayors of the city of Lawrence, Kansas, United States of America.

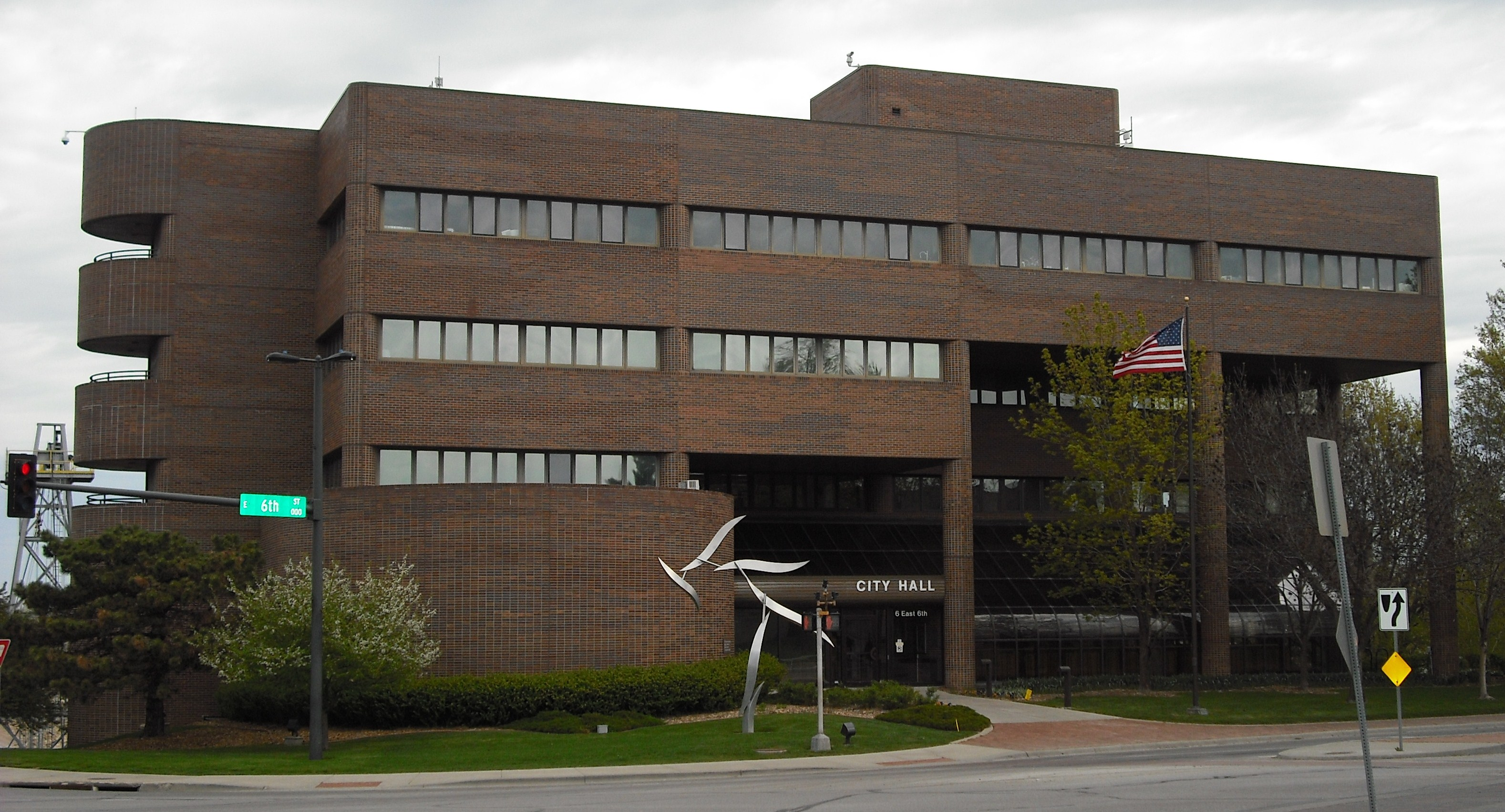
Lawrence City Hall building in Kansas, 2011

- James Blood, 1857
- Carmi William Babcock, 1858
- George W. Deitzler, 1860
- A. Fuller, 1861
- Samuel K. Huson, 1862
- George W. Collamore, 1863
- Gurdon Grovenor, 1865-70
- Wm. H.R. Lykins, 1866
- Samuel Kimball, 1867
- T.J. Sternberch, 1868
- Washington Hadley, 1869-1872
- Fortunatus Gleason, 1873
- John K. Rankin, 1874-1876
- Reuben Ludington, 1864, 1876
- I.N. Van Hoenson, 1878
- John P. Usher, 1879
- J. D. Bowersock, 1881-1885
- Theodore Poehler, 1885
- George J. Barker, 1887, c.1907-1908
- Albert Henley, 1889
- N. Simmons, 1893
- August L. Selig, 1893–1895, c.1904
- A. Shaw, 1894
- George R. Gould, 1897-1899
- J. A. Keeler, 1905
- S. D. Bishop, 1906
- E. U. Bond, 1913
- W. J. Francisco, 1914-1918
- George L. Kreeck, 1918-1924
- Frank M. Holliday, 1924-1927
- Robert C. Rankin, 1927-1930
- W. C. Ellis, 1930-1933
- W. E. Spalding, 1933-1935
- Alfred Lawrence, 1935-1939
- C. B. Russell, 1939-1947
- James Parsons, 1947-1949
- Wm. J. B. Turner, 1949-1951
- Chris Kraft, 1951-1955
- John P. Crown, 1955-59
- John Weatherwax, 1957-1961
- Ted A. Kennedy, 1961-1962
- Ben Barteldes, 1962-1963
- V. C. Springer, 1963-1964
- James V. Owens, 1964-1965
- Ernest E. Pulliam, 1965-1966
- James F. Schubert, 1966-1967
- Richard H. Raney, 1967-1968
- John H. Emick, 1968–1969, 1972-1973
- Clark O. Morton, 1969-1970
- Donald E. Metzler, 1970-1971
- J.R. Pulliam, 1971-1972
- Nancy S. Hambleton, 1973-1974
- Jack Rose, 1974-1975
- Barkley Clark, 1975–1976, 1979-1980
- Fred Pence, 1976-1977
- Marjorie Argersinger, 1977-1978
- Donald A. Binns, 1978-1979
- Ed C. Carter, 1980-1981
- Marci Francisco, 1981-1983
- David P.J. Longhurst, 1983-1984
- Ernest Angino, 1984-1985
- Mike Amyx, 1985–1986, 1987–1988, 2006–2007, 2010–2011, 2014–2015, 2015–2016
- Sandra K. Praeger, 1986-1987
- Robert J. Shumm, 1988-1990
- Shirley Martin-Smith, 1990-1991
- Robert L. Walters, 1991-1992
- Robert C. Schulte, 1992-1993
- John Nalbandian, 1993-1994
- F. Jolene Andersen, 1994-1995
- Bob Moody, 1995-1996
- Bonnie Augustine, 1997-1998
- Martin Kennedy, 1998-1999
- Ervin E. Hodges, 1999-2000
- James R. Henry, 2000-2001
- Mike Rundle, 2001–2002, 2004-2005
- Sue Hack, 2002–2003, 2007-2008
- David M. Dunfield, 2003-2004
- Dennis “Boog” Highberger, 2005-2006
- Mike Dever, 2008–2009, 2013-2014
- Robert Chestnut, 2009-2010
- Aron Cromwell, 2011-2012
- Bob Schumm, 2012-2013
- Jeremy Farmer, 2015
- Leslie Soden, 2017
- Stuart Boley, 2018
- Lisa Larsen, 2019, 2023
- Jennifer Ananda, 2020
- Brad Finkeldei, 2021
- Cortney Shipley, 2022
- Bart Littlejohn, 2024

== See also ==
- Old Lawrence City Hall, in use c.1929-1970
- Lawrence history
