= George Deitzler =

American anti-slavery politician and Union army officer (1826-1884)

George Washington Deitzler
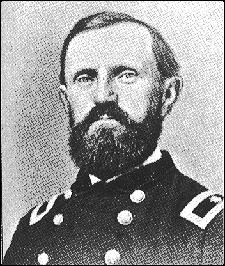
- Deitzler, c. November 1862
- Born: November 30, 1826; Pine Grove, Pennsylvania, U.S.
- Died: April 11, 1884 (aged 57); Tucson, Arizona Territory, U.S.
- Burial place: Oak Hill Cemetery, Lawrence, Kansas, U.S.
- Military career
- Allegiance: United States; Union
- Branch: Union Army
- Service years: 1861–1865
- Rank: Brigadier General; Major General, Kansas militia
- Commands: 1st Kansas Volunteer Infantry Regiment
- Conflicts: American Civil War

George Washington Deitzler (November 30, 1826 – April 11, 1884) was a Union Army General during the American Civil War. He was also known as the mayor of Lawrence, Kansas, in 1860 and served as Treasurer of The University of Kansas after. Deitzler was a prominent member of The Free State Party in Kansas and after the war, the Republican Party.

== Biography ==
Deitzler was born George Washington Ditzler in Pine Grove, Pennsylvania, where he received a common school education ("very common" he once said). As a young man, he moved to the new West. After a short residence in Illinois, and in California, Deitzler went to Lawrence Kansas in March 1855. While in San Francisco, Deitzler had added the e before the i in his name and persuaded his brother, Rev. Jefferson M. Deitzler (still in Pennsylvania) to do the same.

In Kansas, Deitzler “grew up with the state.” He engaged in farming and real estate dealing. He soon took an active part in politics. When the plan to organize a free-state government was set to foot in opposition to the pro-slavery territorial government, Deitzler was sent to Boston to see Amos Lawrence and other friends of the cause. He received an order for one hundred Sharp's rifles which were very soon on their way to Kansas in boxes marked "books." Other shipments of "books" soon followed. Military companies armed with the new weapons were formed among the free-state men. In the so-called Wakarusa War in November 1855, Deitzler was aid-de-camp to the commander of the free-state forces, and during part of the time was in full command.

A few months later, when the territorial judiciary began to function, Chief Justice Lecompte instructed a grand jury sitting at Lecompton that levying war on the authorities of the territory was treason against the state. Deitzler and several other free-state leaders were indicted on charges of treason. They were immediately arrested and kept in a prison tent at Lecompton for about four months. Subsequently, their indictments were dismissed by issuing a nolle prosequi.

Deitzler's activities on behalf of the free-state cause were incessant. He served on committees, attended meetings and conventions, counseled with other leaders, and wrote for the press. He was first elected a member of the free-state territorial legislature of 1857–1858 and was re-elected in 1859–1860. During those terms, Deitzler was elected as speaker of the Kansas House of Representatives. He was also a member of the Kansas Senate under the Topeka Constitution.

In 1860, Deitzler was elected mayor of Lawrence, Kansas, and was also treasurer of the University of Kansas.

At the outbreak of the Civil War, Deitzler raised the 1st Kansas Infantry and was appointed its colonel. He led his regiment in Missouri and commanded the 4th Brigade at the Battle of Wilson's Creek, where he was wounded.

On April 4, 1863, he was appointed brigadier general of volunteers, to rank from November 29, 1862. President Abraham Lincoln nominated Deitzler for the promotion on March 4, 1863, and the U.S. Senate confirmed the nomination on March 9, 1863. Deitzler commanded the 1st Brigade, 6th Division, XVII Corps, during the Vicksburg campaign. After the fall of Vicksburg his ill health, exacerbated by the hot southern climate and his inability to secure transfer to a different region, caused him to tender his resignation on August 12, 1863, which was accepted on August 27, 1863, allowing him to return to Kansas.

In Kansas, Deitzler received a commission as major general of Kansas militia. During Confederate Major General Sterling Price's Missouri Expedition in 1864, Deitzler commanded 10,000 Kansas State Militia units in the Army of the Border. Deitzler's units were reluctant to fight in Missouri, therefore it was not until the Confederates reached the town of Westport, near the Kansas/Missouri state line, that Deitzler brought his troops into action. The additional troops proved decisive as the Confederates, then outnumbered more than 2 to 1, were defeated at the Battle of Westport. After the war, Deitzler promoted railroads and died in Tucson, Arizona. While in Southern Arizona in the spring of 1884, General Deitzler was thrown from a buggy and died from his injuries.

Deitzler married Anna McNeil of Lexington, Missouri, in September, 1864. In 1872 the family moved to California. George Washington Deitzler and Anna McNeil Deitzler had two sons: Walter Henry Deitzler and George Jefferson Deitzler. Two of Walter Henry Deitzler's sons, Harry George "Dick" Deitzler and Arthur Deitzler spent the remainder of their lives in Lebanon, Pennsylvania. Four of George Jefferson Deitzler's children also lived in Lebanon, Pennsylvania: Thomas E. Deitzler, Annie Deitzler, Mrs, Harry F. Speicher, and Mrs. James Haddow.

George Washington Deitzler was the great grandson of John Jacob Ditzler, born approximately 1765. John Jacob Ditzler immigrated to Lancaster County, Pennsylvania from Germany with his brothers Thomas and Michael (Melchor) in the late 1700s. John Jacob Ditzler married Margaret Henne May 27, 1792. Their son Jacob Ditzler married Maria Minnig. Jacob and Maria had two sons, Rev. Jefferson M. Deitzler and Gen. George Washington Deitzler, both of whom subsequently added the e before the i in their names.

The main facts of Deitzler's career are presented in his brief autobiography, now in the Archives of the Kansas State Historical Society. Secondary sources are D.W. Wilder, Annals of Kansas (1875); G.T. Andreas, History of the State of Kansas (1863); L.W.Spring, Kansas (1885); F.W. Blackmar, Life of Chas. Robinson (1902); Trans. Kan. Hist. Soc., IV (1886–88), V (1891–96), VI (1897-1900), VIII (1903–04), X (1907–08), and XIII (1913–14). The date of Deitzler's death is sometimes given as April 11, but the Leavenworth Evening Standard, April 11, 1884, states that he died April 10.

== See also ==
- List of mayors of Lawrence, Kansas
