= Elizabeth Watkins (philanthropist) =

Kansas philanthropist (1861–1939)

Elizabeth Josephine Watkins (1861-1939) was a philanthropist, best known for funding hospitals and scholarship halls in Lawrence, Kansas.

She was born Elizabeth Josephine Miller in New Paris, Ohio in 1861. Her family moved to Lawrence, Kansas in 1872, where she attended preparatory school at the University of Kansas. In 1875, her father's death forced her to leave school and find work to financially support her family. She worked at J.B. Watkins Land and Mortgage Company, where she eventually became the secretary to the company's wealthy founder and president, Jabez Bunting Watkins. In 1909, Elizabeth Miller's mother died, and she married J.B. Watkins. J.B. died in 1921 and left his entire fortune of $2.4 million to Elizabeth Watkins.

Watkins' major donations include building the Watkins Scholarship Hall at KU (1926), Lawrence Memorial Hospital (1928), Watkins Memorial Hospital (1931), Watkins Nurses Home (1937), and Miller Scholarship Hall at KU (1937). She also donated the Watkins Bank Building to the City of Lawrence in 1929 (a property initially belonging to her husband through his role as president of Watkins National Bank). This building was used as Lawrence City Hall until 1970, when it was transferred to the Douglas County Historical Society, which now runs the Elizabeth Miller Watkins Community Museum there.

Elizabeth Watkins died in 1939. She bequeathed substantial property to the University of Kansas, including her home, which is now the Chancellor's residence. Her papers are held with those of her husband in the KU Kenneth Spencer Research Library.
