= Zimmerman School =

- U.S. National Register of Historic Places
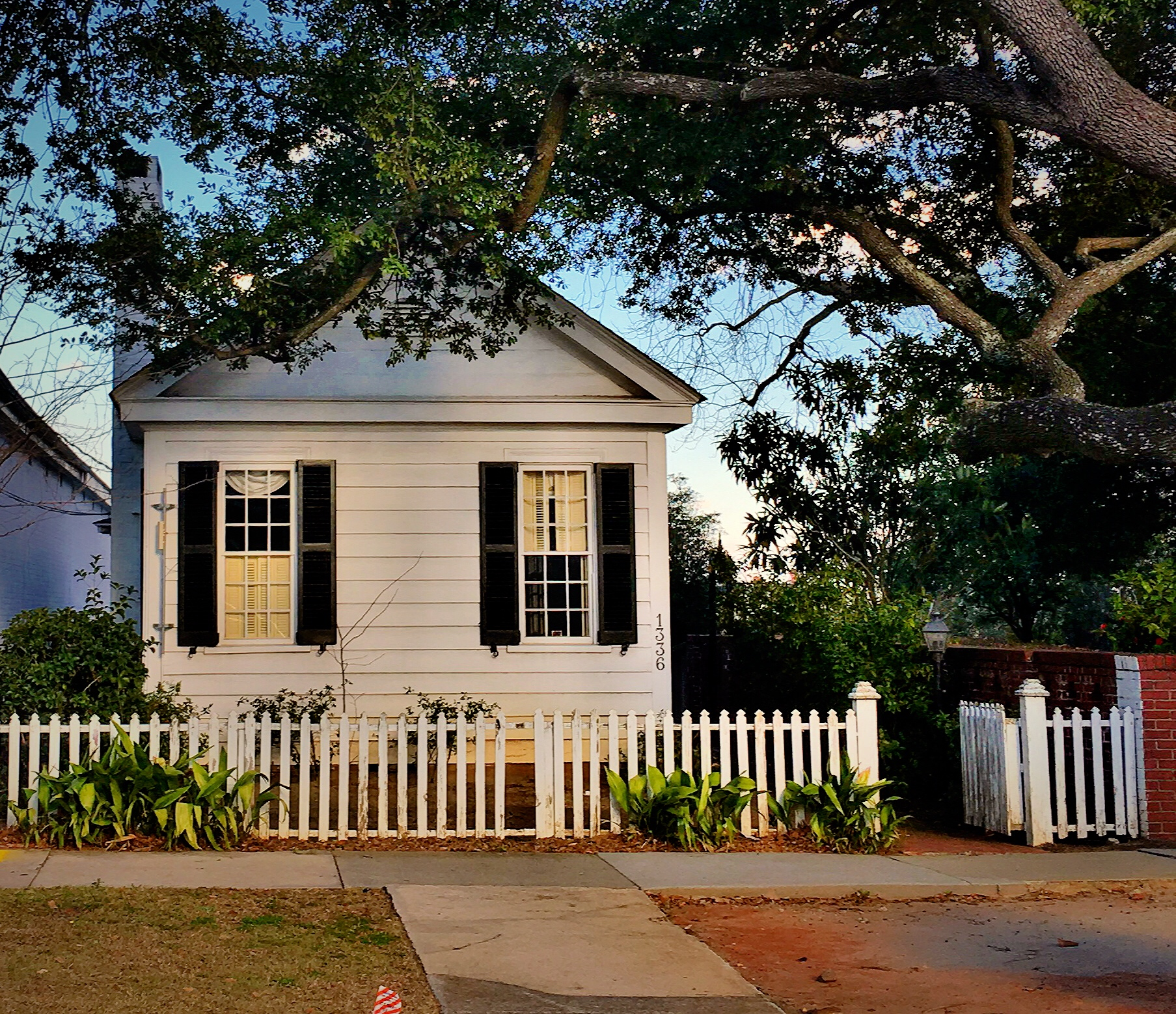

- Location within South Carolina Location within the United States
- Location: 1336 Pickens St. Columbia, South Carolina
- Coordinates: 34°0′21″N 81°1′41″W
- Area: 0.1 acres (0.040 ha)
- Built: 1848
- Architectural style: Greek Revival
- MPS: Columbia MRA
- NRHP reference No.: 79003356
- Added to NRHP: March 2, 1979

The Zimmerman School is a historic school building located at Columbia, South Carolina. It was built in 1848, and is a small Greek Revival style one-story clapboard building with a gable roof. The school was built by Charles and Hannah Zimmerman, who operated it from 1848 to 1870, and also built the neighboring Zimmerman House.

It was added to the National Register of Historic Places in 1979.
