= John G. Haskell =

American architect

John Gideon Haskell
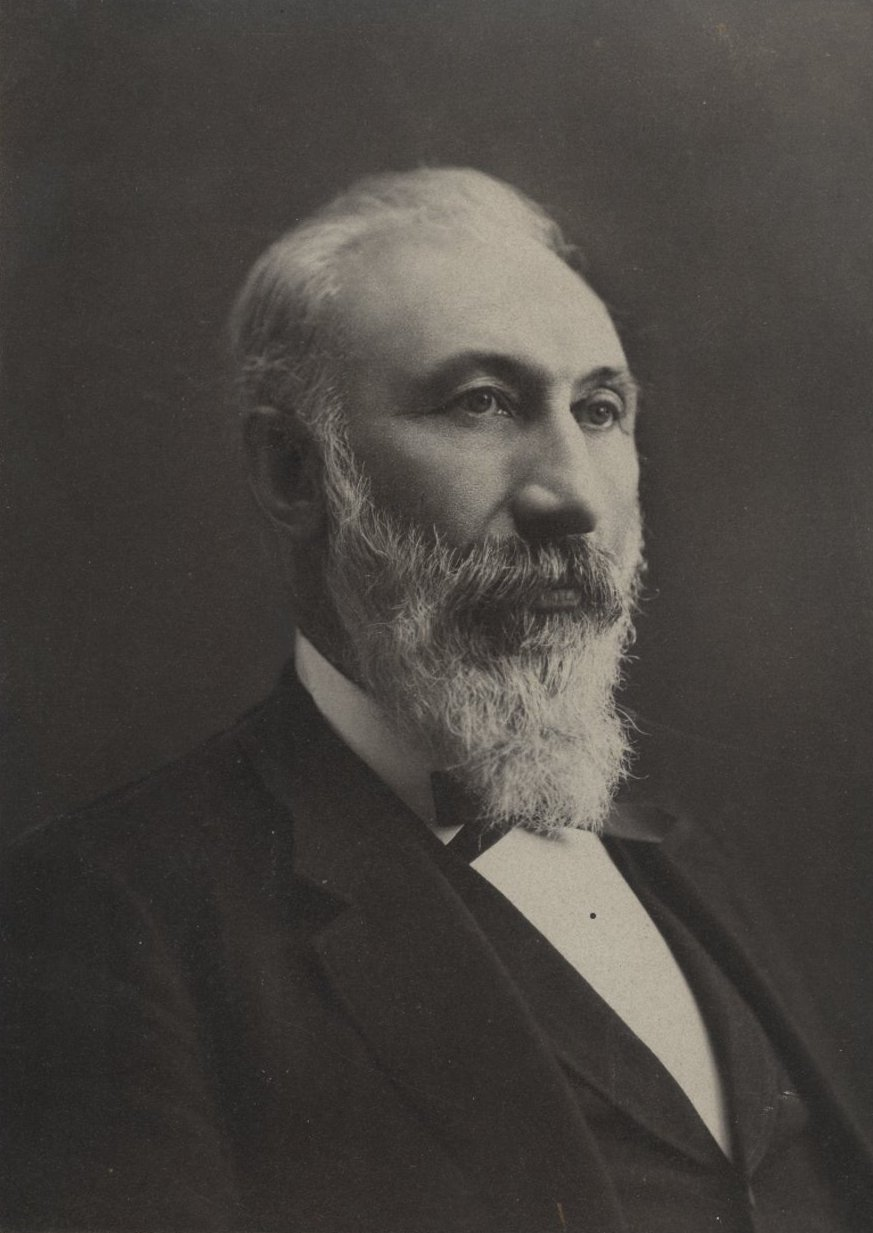
- Born: February 5, 1832; Milton, Vermont
- Died: November 25, 1907 (aged 75); Lawrence, Kansas
- Education: Brown University

John Gideon Haskell (February 5, 1832 – November 25, 1907) was an architect who designed portions of the Kansas State Capitol and other public buildings in the state.

Haskell was born in Milton, Vermont. His father moved to Lawrence, Kansas in 1854 with the New England Emigrant Aid Company while Haskell was attending Brown University and had an architect job in Boston. After his father died in 1857, he moved to Kansas where he lived for the rest of his life.

He joined the Union army during the American Civil War. After the war he was named official state architect and as such finished the work on the Kansas State Capitol.

He was recruited by county commissioners of Greenwood County and Chase County in east central Kansas to design their courthouses, which he did in 1871, and he designed other courthouses as well.

== Works ==
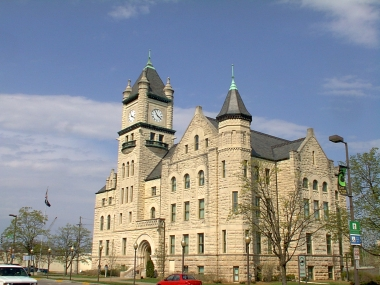
Douglas County Courthouse (1903)

- Kansas State Capitol (wings)
- Topeka State Hospital, Topeka
- Osawatomie State Hospital, Osawatomie, Kansas
- Snow Hall, University of Kansas, Lawrence (torn down and rebuilt)
- Bailey Hall (University of Kansas), Lawrence (NRHP)
- Chase County Courthouse (1871), Cottonwood Falls, Kansas (NRHP)
- English Lutheran Church, Lawrence (NRHP)
- Ludington House, Lawrence (NRHP)
- Plymouth Congregational Church (Lawrence, Kansas), Lawrence (NRHP)
- Sunnyside School, Jefferson County, Kansas (NRHP)
- Thacher Building, Topeka (NRHP)
- Roberts House (now the "Castle Tea Room") on Massachusetts Street in Lawrence
- Bernhard Warkentin Homestead
- First United Methodist Church, Lawrence
- Greenwood County Courthouse (1871)
- Barton County Courthouse (1871)
- McPherson County Courthouse (1894–95), Richardsonian Romanesque
- Douglas County Courthouse (1903), Richardsonian Romanesque
- University of Kansas Powerhouse (1887, now the Hall Center for the Humanities)
