= St. Luke African Methodist Episcopal Church (Lawrence, Kansas) =

Historic church in Kansas, United States

- Saint Luke African Methodist Episcopal Church
- U.S. National Register of Historic Places
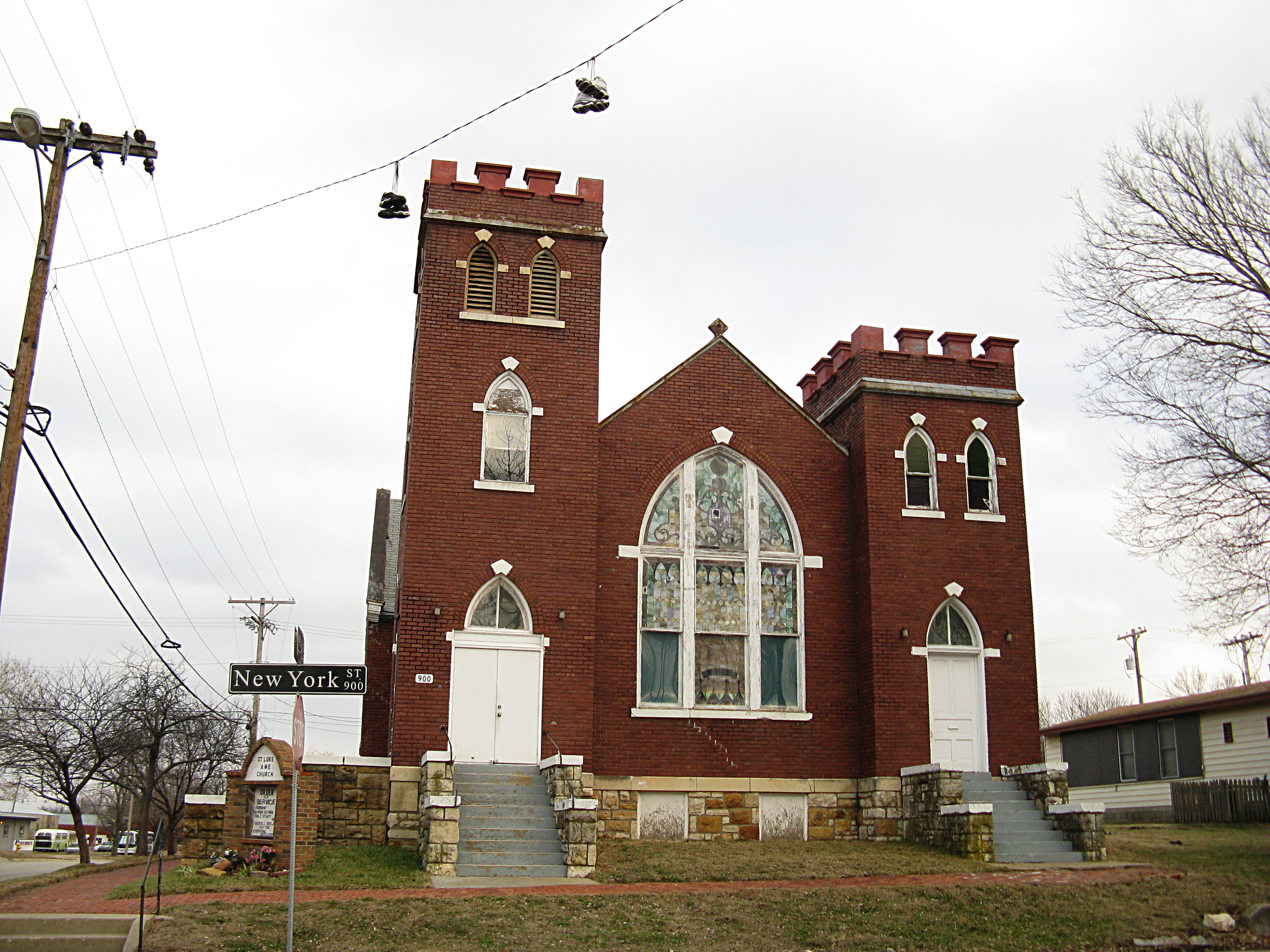

- Location within Kansas Location within the United States
- Location: 900 New York St., Lawrence, Kansas
- Coordinates: 38°58′3″N 95°13′50″W
- Area: less than one acre
- Built: 1910
- Architect: Constant, J.T.
- Architectural style: Late Gothic Revival
- NRHP reference No.: 05001240
- Added to NRHP: November 15, 2005

Saint Luke African Methodist Episcopal Church is a historic church at 900 New York Street in Lawrence, Kansas, United States. It was built in 1910 and added to the National Register of Historic Places in 2005.

It is mainly a one-story building 43 by 90.5 feet (13.1 m × 27.6 m) in plan. It has two crenelated towers, one 34 feet (10 m) tall and the other 26 feet (7.9 m) tall.
