= Vinland Grange Hall =

- U.S. National Register of Historic Places
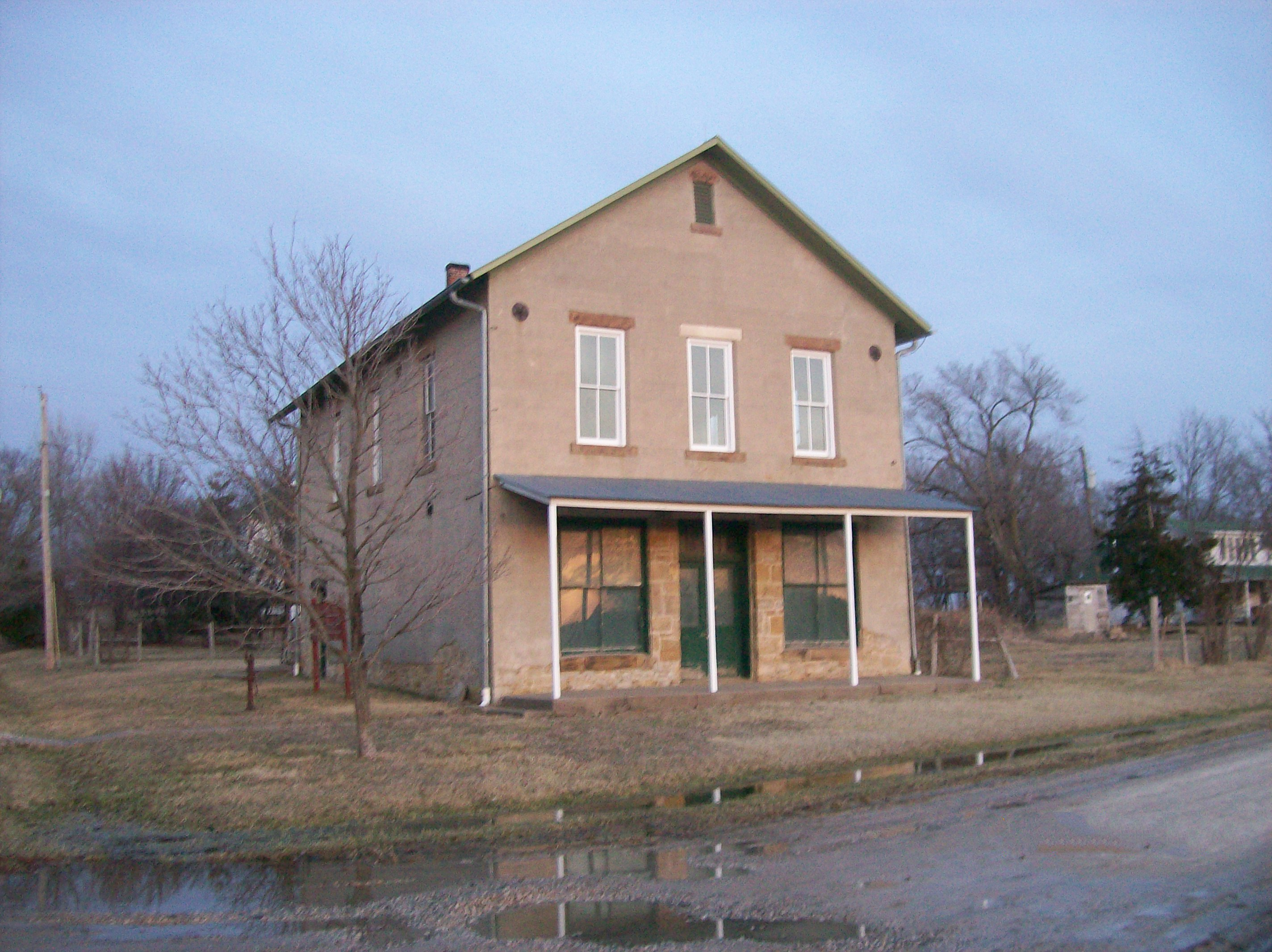
- Vinland Grange Hall

- Location within Kansas Location within the United States
- Location: Jct. of Oak and Main Sts., Vinland, Kansas
- Coordinates: 38°50′21″N 95°10′56″W
- Area: less than one acre
- Built: 1884
- Architectural style: Gable front
- NRHP reference No.: 00000037
- Added to NRHP: February 10, 2000

Vinland Grange Hall, located in Vinland, Kansas, United States, was built in 1884. It historically served as a meeting hall and as a business. It was listed on the National Register of Historic Places in 2000 for its architecture.

== See also ==
- The National Grange of the Order of Patrons of Husbandry
