= Lawrence Memorial Hospital (Kansas) =

- LMH Health
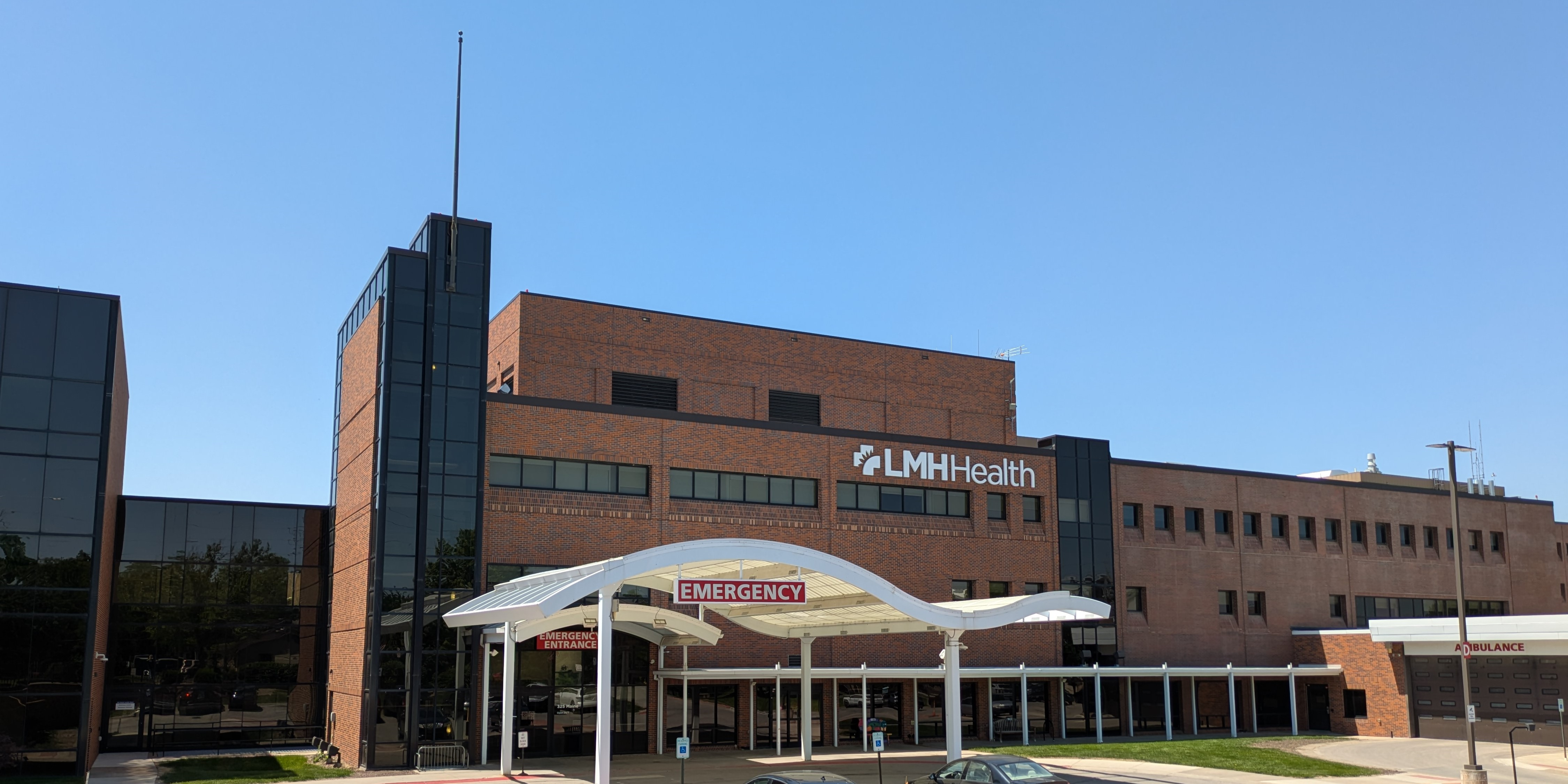
- Emergency department entrance

Geography
- Location: Lawrence, Kansas, United States
- Coordinates: 38.979°N 95.249°W

Organization
- Funding: Non-profit hospital

Services
- Emergency department: Level IV trauma center
- Beds: 174
- Helipad: FAA LID: SN38

History
- Opened: 1921

Links
- Website: www.lmh.org
- Lists: Hospitals in Kansas

Lawrence Memorial Hospital is a non-profit, 174-bed hospital in Lawrence, Kansas, owned and operated by LMH Health.

== History ==
Prior to 1919, there was no publicly owned hospital in Lawrence to care for the poor. In response to this need, the Social Service League purchased a house at 3rd and Maine Streets and donated it to the City of Lawrence to establish a hospital. Through fundraising efforts, $10,000 was raised to renovate and equip the building, and Lawrence Memorial Hospital officially opened its doors on January 17, 1921.

As the community grew in the 1920s, the limitations of the original facility became apparent. Recognizing this need, Elizabeth Miller Watkins offered a donation of $200,000 to construct a new hospital. Watkin's donation was used to construct a new 50-bed brick hospital building that opened in 1929.

In the mid-2000s, Lawrence Memorial Hospital announced the beginning of a $35 million expansion project. The project was intended to improve patient care by relocating and enlarging the emergency department, converting all patient rooms to private rooms, renovating the intensive care unit (ICU) and operating rooms, and adding new birthing rooms in the obstetrics department.

In 2023, LMH Health entered into a partnership with the University of Kansas Health System, bringing specialist care in areas such as sports medicine, vascular surgery, and maternal-fetal medicine to the hospital.

== Ownership ==
Lawrence Memorial Hospital is owned and operated by the non-profit LMH Health. While publicly owned by the City of Lawrence, LMH Health receives no taxpayer funding from the city or Douglas County.
