= Zimmerman House (Columbia, South Carolina) =

Historic house in South Carolina, United States

- U.S. National Register of Historic Places
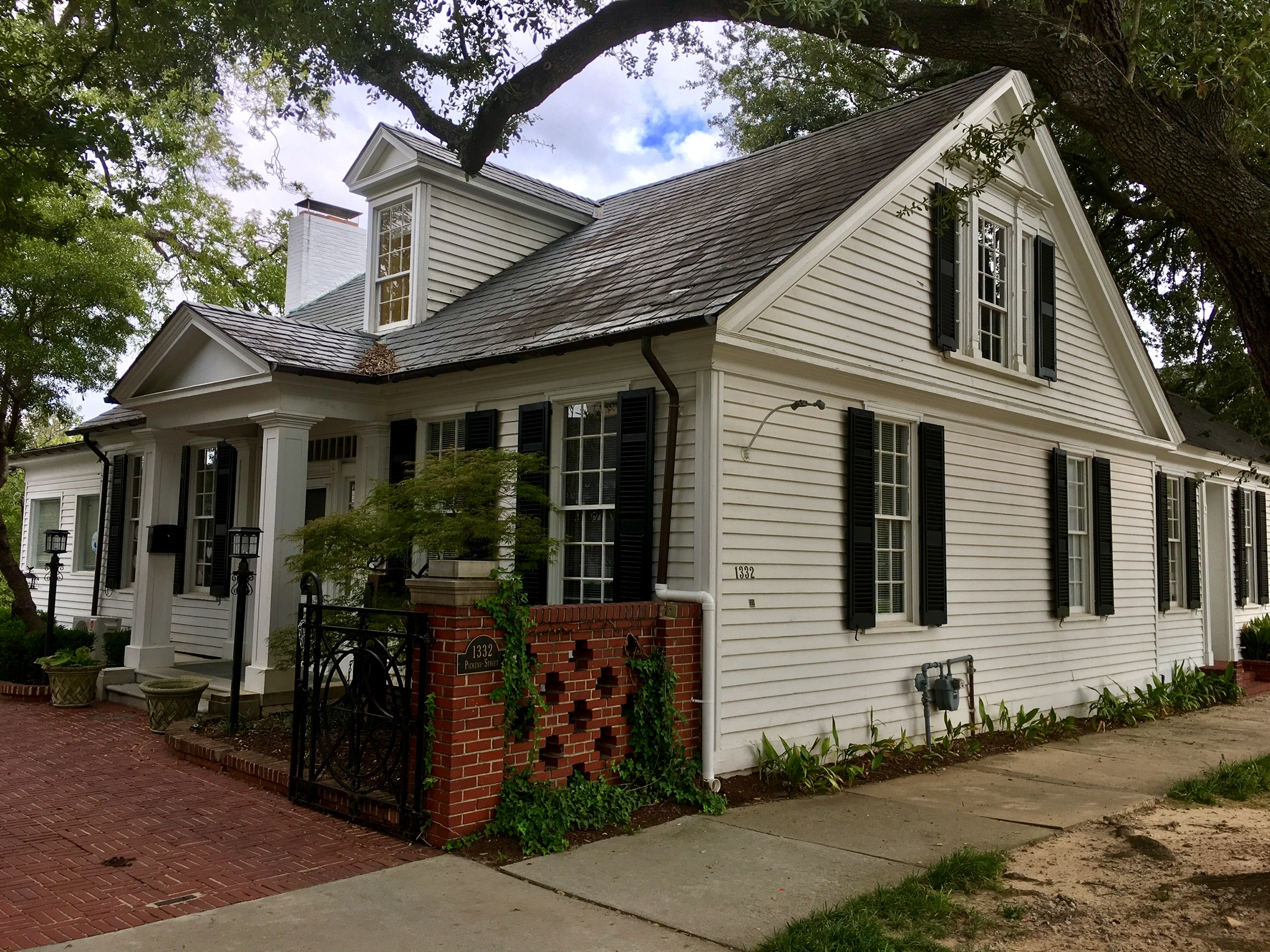

- Location within South Carolina Location within the United States
- Location: 1332 Pickens St., Columbia, South Carolina
- Coordinates: 34°0′19″N 81°1′41″W
- Area: 0.5 acres (0.20 ha)
- Built: 1848
- Architectural style: Greek Revival
- MPS: Columbia MRA
- NRHP reference No.: 79003355
- Added to NRHP: March 2, 1979

The Zimmerman House is a historic home located at Columbia, South Carolina, United States. It was built in 1848, and consists of a 1 1/2-story main section and a one-story wing. The front façade features a Greek Revival style pedimented portico supported by two paneled wooden square columns. The house was built by Charles and Hannah Zimmerman, who operated the neighboring Zimmerman School from 1848 to 1870.

It was added to the National Register of Historic Places in 1979.
