= Richard Cordley =

American protestant minister (1829–1904)

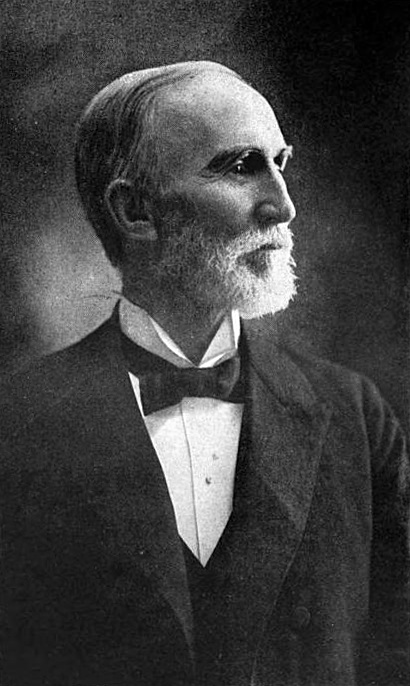
- Richard Cordley in 1903
- Born: September 6, 1829; Nottingham, England
- Died: July 11, 1904 (aged 74); Lawrence, Kansas, US
- Education: University of Michigan (B.A.); Andover Theological Seminary (M.A.); University of Kansas (D.D., hon. caus.)
- Political party: Republican
- Military career
- Allegiance: United States
- Branch: 3rd Kansas Militia
- Service years: 1864-1865
- Rank: Private
- Nicknames: "The Abolition Preacher" "The Jayhawker Preacher"
- Conflicts: American Civil War; Bleeding Kansas

Richard Cordley (September 6, 1829 – July 11, 1904) was a Protestant minister and abolitionist associated with the Jayhawkers of Kansas. Known primarily as the pastor of Plymouth Congregational Church in Lawrence, Kansas in the 19th and early 20th century, Cordley was an early settler of Lawrence and a survivor of both the Sacking of Lawrence and the Lawrence Massacre in 1863. Cordley wrote about the history of Lawrence and the state of Kansas later in his lifetime and was also the recipient of the first degree awarded by the University of Kansas.

== Biography ==
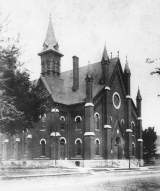
The Plymouth Congregational "Brick Church", shortly after being constructed, c. 1870. During this time, Cordley was the church's pastor.

Cordley was born on September 6, 1829, in Nottingham, England. He later immigrated to Livingston County, Michigan, with his family when he was four. He began attending public school when he was about nine, although he had been taught how to read by his "cultivated" mother prior to his attending a formal school. He earned degrees from the University of Michigan (B.A. 1854) and the Andover Theological Seminary (M.A. 1857). In 1874, he also was awarded an honorary Doctor of Divinity degree from the University of Kansas—making him the recipient of the first degree bestowed by the then-fledgling KU.

In 1857, he became the pastor of Plymouth Congregational Church in Lawrence, Kansas, a position that he held until 1875. From that later year until 1884, he served in Flint, Michigan, and Emporia, Kansas. Then, in 1884, he returned to Lawrence and resumed his role as the pastor at Plymouth Congregational Church. He died on July 11, 1904.

== Interest in education ==
Cordley was instrumental in the founding of both the University of Kansas and Washburn University in nearby Topeka. He was elected the president of the latter in 1871, but turned down the offer so that he might stay in Lawrence. He also served as a state board regent, and was an active member of the Lawrence School Board (serving as its president from 1885–91).

== Religion and politics ==
Cordley, according to Nathan Wilson, was a "staunch advocate of New England moral reforms," and when he arrived in Lawrence, he began to impact the moral development of the town. In particular, he strove to promote strict Sabbath adherence, as well as the prohibition of slavery, the prohibition of alcohol sales and consumption, and advocacy for Christian fundamentalism. Slavery, in particular, was despised by Cordley, and he established the Plymouth Congregational Church at least in part to aid and educate runaway slaves. During the Bleeding Kansas period, Cordley was known as the "Abolition Preacher", due to his opposition to slavery.

Cordley spoke frequently about his belief in the importance of loyalty to God, family, and national identity, and is quoted in his posthumously released book Sermons as saying, "There are some things to which a man gives a specified service, and there are others to which he gives his entire self. A man owes his friends certain social obligations, but to his home he gives his entire self. A man does not gives sections of himself to the things that he loves. In some such sense Christ wants you. It is not a section of your personality, or time, or means, but of your entire self, with all which that implies that Christ wants. It is reasonable you should give yourself to your family, for your life is wrapped up in your family. It is reasonable you should give yourself to your nation, for your nation has in its keeping all that you have and are. It is reasonable you should give yourself to God, for God is the giver of all you have and the foundation of all you hope for." In another service, Cordley said, "You may serve God in the home, but you are at the call of God to serve Him in whatever line his providence may lead you. The claims of God are higher than that of nation, for He created your nation. His claims are higher than that of family, for He made family possible."

In the same sermon, Cordley spoke of his belief that the education system in America only turned out copycats and instructors rather than genuine masters of a craft, saying, "Our schools are the glory of our age, but there are limitations to their capabilities and things in which they should never attempt to do. A college diploma is not a guaranty [sic] of scholarship any more than a church letter is a guaranty [sic] of sainthood. A college diploma often covers a record of laziness, and a limping course. Often they come to us in sheep's-skin clothing, but inwardly they are but simpering fools. It is not the fault of the schools, but it does show their limitations. We have schools of art which do grand work, but no school of art has ever had the temerity to advertise that it turned out artists. They turn out copyists and critics and even teachers of art, but not actual artists. There are schools of elocution, but they do not even pretend to turn our orators. So it is true that one cannot be made an artist or an orator. They are born not made. When God creates one He will open a door for him somewhere."

Because Cordley was an abolitionist who supported the free state movement, during the Lawrence Massacre (1863), he was hunted by pro-Confederate forces led by William Quantrill. While his home was burned, he survived, as did his church's building. (Quantrill later lamented that he was unable to kill the "Abolition Preacher".) Cordley was influential in documenting such events in the early settlement of Kansas.

== Commemorations ==
Cordley Elementary School in Lawrence, KS was named after Richard Cordley.

== Selected works ==
- The Lawrence Massacre (1865)
- A History of Lawrence, Kansas: From the Earliest Settlement to the Close of the Rebellion (1895)
- Pioneer Days in Kansas (1903)
- Sermons (1912)

== Bibliography ==
- Blackmar, Frank W., ed. (1912). "Cordley, Richard". Kansas: A Cyclopedia of State History. Vol. 1. Chicago, IL: Standard Publishing Company. Archived from the original on 2016-04-26.
- Burdick, William L. (1912). "An Appreciation". Sermons. Concord, NH: Bumford Press. pp. vii–xiv.
- Cordley, Richard (1903a). "Incidents of the Raid". Pioneer Days in Kansas. New York City, NY: Pilgrim Press. pp. 190–213.
- Cordley, Richard (1903b). "Preface". Pioneer Days in Kansas. New York City, NY: Pilgrim Press. pp. 3–4.
- University of Michigan (1902). General Catalogue of Officers and Students, 1837-1901. University of Michigan. p. 34. "university of michigan graduates richard cordley."
- Wilson, Nathan (2004). "Congregationalist Richard Cordley and the Impactof New England Cultural Imperialism in Kansas,1857–1904". Great Plains Quarterly. 24 (3).
