= Otis B. Gunn =

American politician (1828–1901)

Otis Berthoude Gunn (October 27, 1828 – February 18, 1901) was a railroad engineer and Kansas state senator who received an appointment to serve as a major in the Fourth Volunteer Kansas regiment in the Union Army during the American Civil War, and later in the Tenth Kansas Infantry. He served on governor George F. Robinson's staff. The Historical Society of Kansas has a collection of his and his family's papers.

He was born October 27, 1828, in Montague, Massachusetts to Otis and Lucy Fisk Gunn.

He was part of the first state senate in Kansas representing Wyandotte County.

Gunn's son Frederick C. Gunn was born in Atchison, Kansas in 1865. The family moved to Kansas City, Missouri when he was 14. The son went on to become an architect and helped design several county courthouses.
