= Vinland, Kansas =

- Unincorporated community
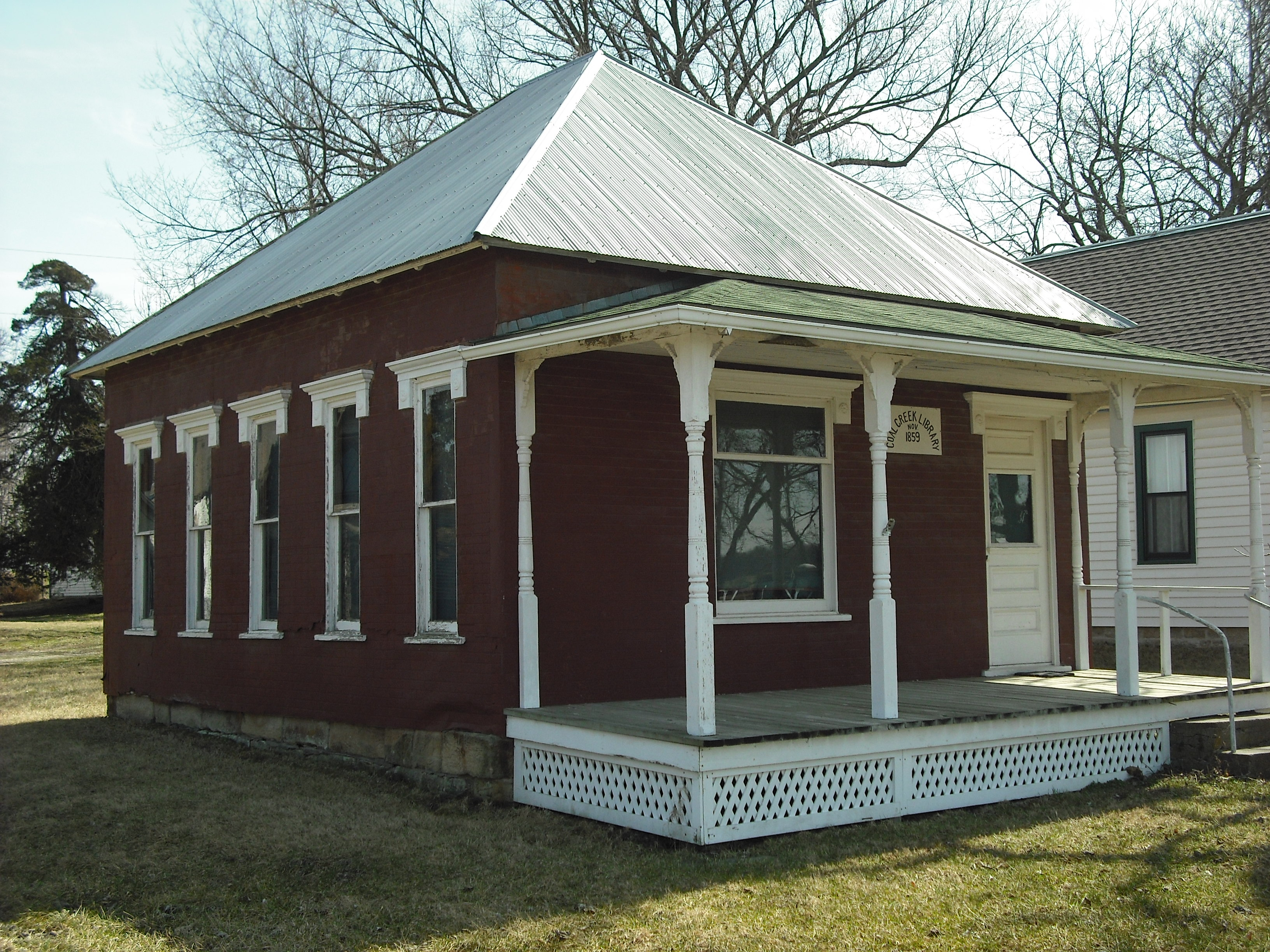
- Coal Creek Library in Vinland, erected in 1900, which is the oldest subscription library in Kansas

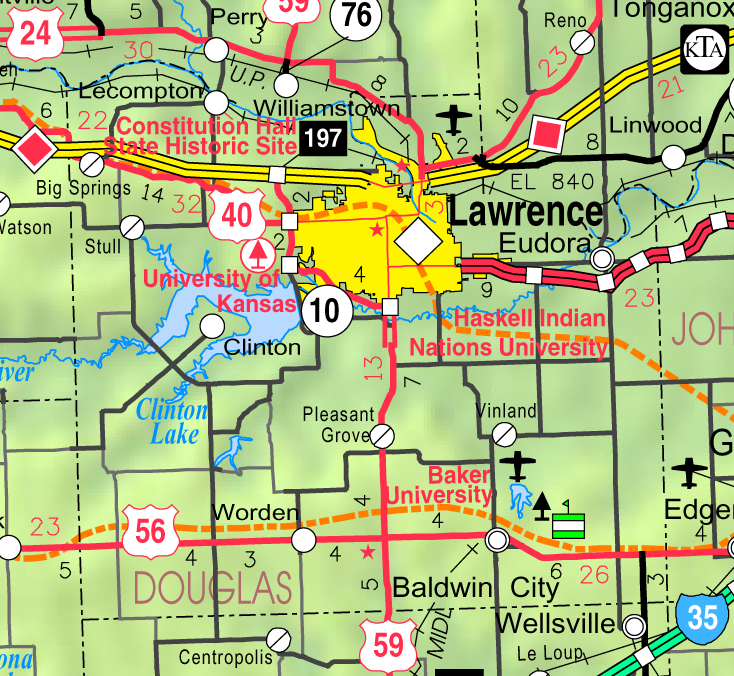
- KDOT map of Douglas County (legend)

- Location within Kansas Location within the United States
- Coordinates: 38°50′22″N 95°10′56″W
- Country: United States
- State: Kansas
- County: Douglas
- Founded: 1854
- Platted: 1860s
- Elevation: 889 ft (271 m)
- Time zone: UTC-6 (CST)
  - Summer (DST): UTC-5 (CDT)
- Area code: 785
- FIPS code: 20-74000
- GNIS ID: 479519

Vinland is an unincorporated community in Douglas County, Kansas, United States. It is located south of Lawrence and north of Baldwin City.

== History ==
The first settlement was made at Vinland in 1854. In the earliest days of the community, some called it "Coal Creek", due to deposits of the sedimentary rock in a nearby waterway. The settlement eventually earned the name "Vineland" (after the orchard of one of the first settlers, William Barnes), which later evolved into "Vinland" after a clerical error. Most of the settlers of the early community were abolitionists or Free-Staters from New England, and consequently, they opposed the extension of slavery into Kansas Territory.

In 1859, Annie Soule and Martha Cutter helped found a library (and an associated book club), in the hopes that it "would contribute to the 'moral, social, and intellectual improvement of [the settlement's] members"; specifically, they hoped "to prevent dancing from becoming the only amusement in the community." The library initially boasted a collection 10 books (which eventually grew to over 2,000), and residents of the small town were allowed to check them out if they contributed an annual fee of 50 cents. The building that currently holds the collection was constructed in 1900 when the community's book supply grew too large. Today, Coal Creek Library is considered the oldest subscription library in the state.

Vinland was not legally platted until the 1860s. A post office was opened in Vinland in 1868, and remained in operation until 1954. In 1912, the population of the settlement was 75, and it housed "a fine agricultural district ... [and] express and telegraph facilities". Today, the Vinland Grange Hall is listed on the National Register of Historic Places.

== Education ==
The community is served by Baldwin City USD 348 public school district.

On December 13, 2010, the Board of Education voted to close Vinland Elementary in Vinland and Marion Springs Elementary in Worden by a 5-2 vote.
