= Bailey Hall (University of Kansas) =

- U.S. National Register of Historic Places
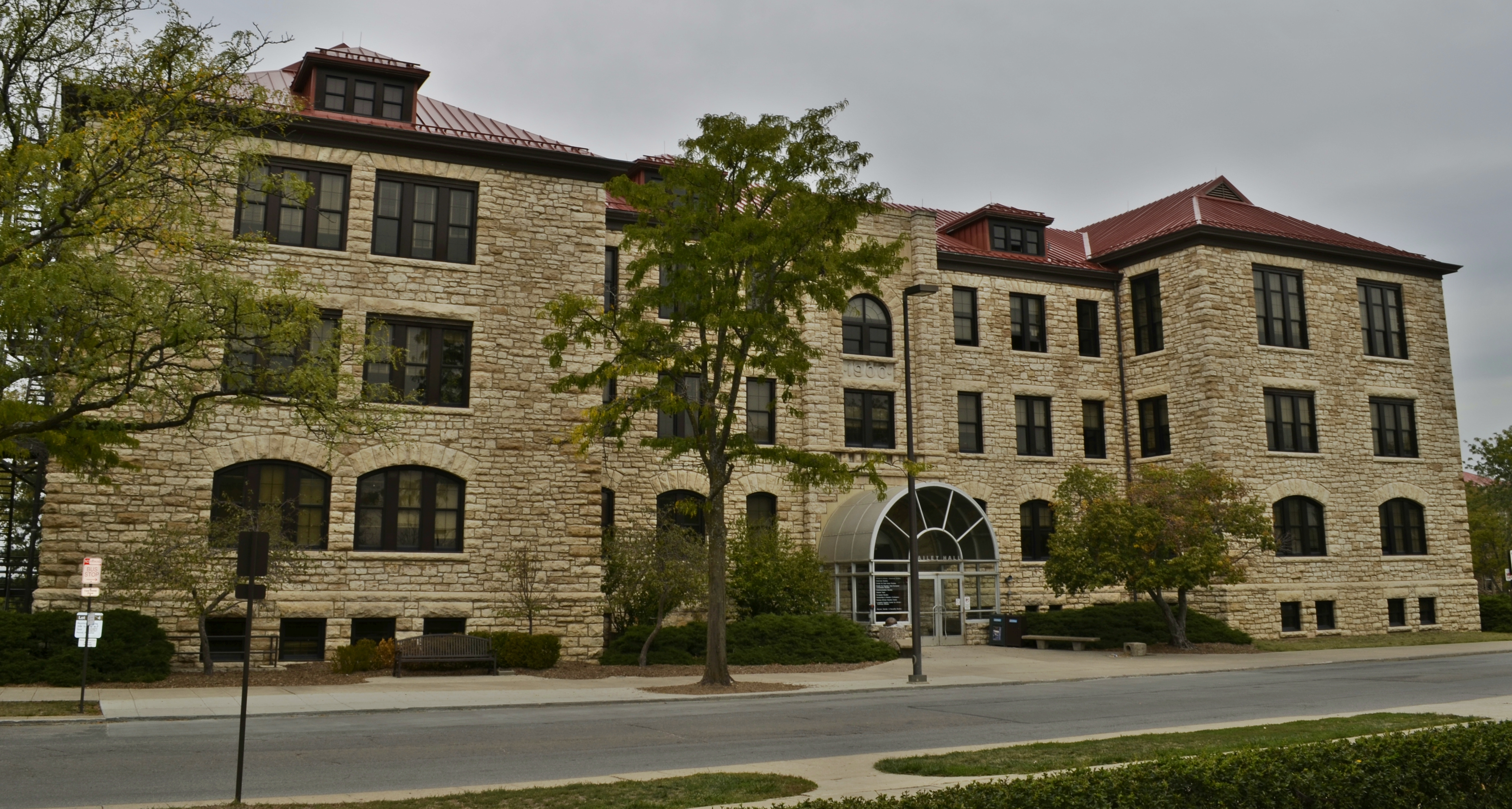

- Location within Kansas Location within the United States
- Location: Jct. of Jayhawk Dr. and Sunflower Rd., Lawrence, Kansas
- Coordinates: 38°57′28″N 95°14′46″W
- Area: less than one acre
- Built: 1905
- Architect: John G. Haskell.; Stubbs, W.R.
- Architectural style: Romanesque
- NRHP reference No.: 01001122
- Added to NRHP: October 22, 2001

Bailey Hall (formerly known as the Chemistry Building), at the University of Kansas in Lawrence, Kansas, was built in 1905. The architect was John G. Haskell who was among the architects of the Kansas State Capitol. It was listed on the National Register of Historic Places in 2001.

Bailey Hall is home to the Center for Russian, East European, and Eurasian Studies, one of 11 National Resource Centers across the United States devoted to this region. Bailey is also home to the Communication Studies department and the Religious Studies department.

== See also ==
- List of oldest buildings on Kansas colleges and universities
