= English Lutheran Church =

Historic church in Kansas, United States

- U.S. National Register of Historic Places
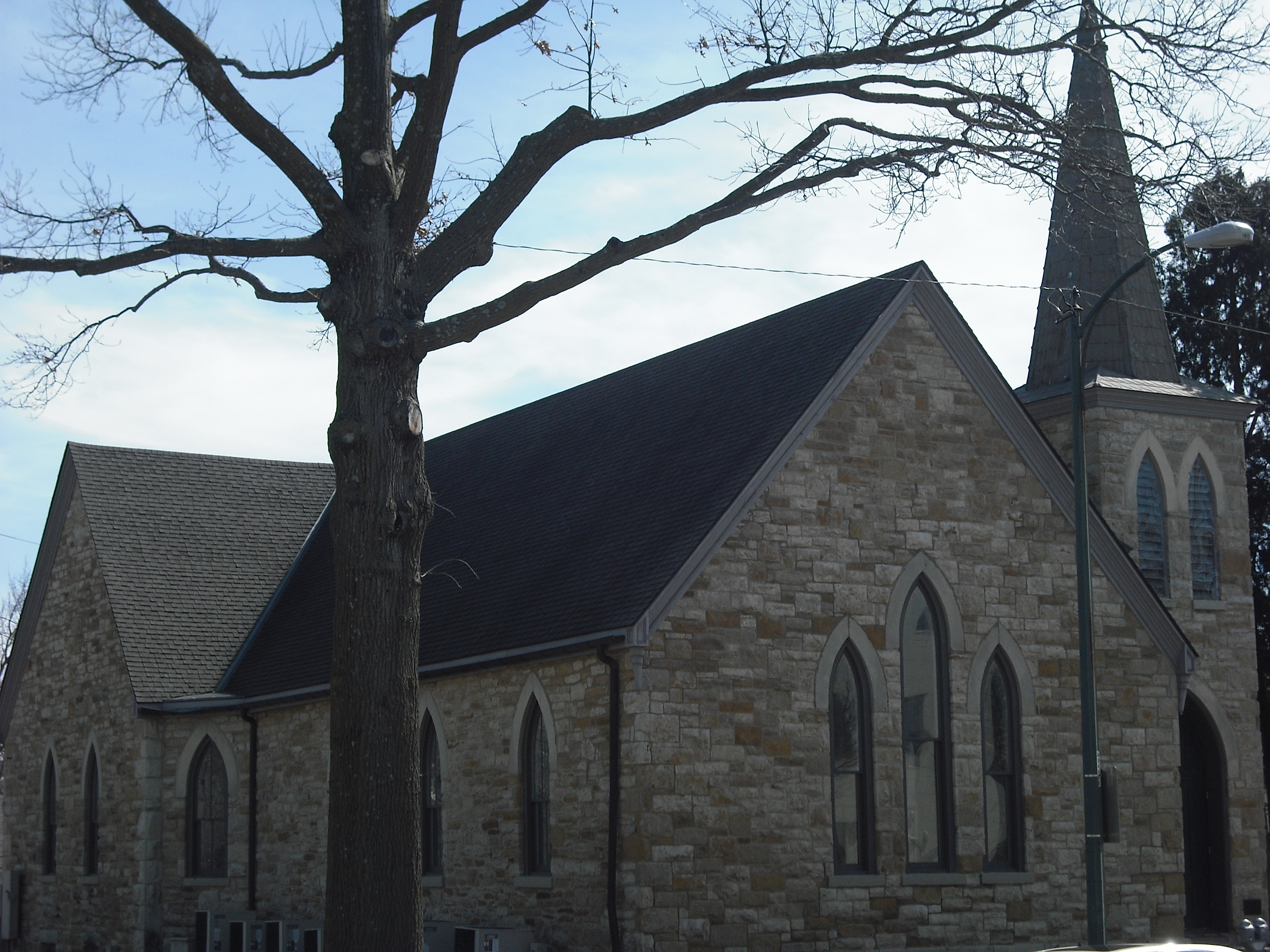

- Location within Kansas Location within the United States
- Location: 1040 New Hampshire St., Lawrence, Kansas
- Coordinates: 38°57′50″N 95°14′4″W
- Area: less than one acre
- Built: c.1870, 1900, 1936, 1941, 1992-1993
- Architect: Haskell, John G.; Lescher, William
- Architectural style: Late Gothic Revival
- NRHP reference No.: 95000945
- Added to NRHP: July 28, 1995

English Lutheran Church is a historic church at 1040 New Hampshire Street in Lawrence, Kansas. It was built in c.1870 and expanded in 1900. It was added to the National Register in 1995.

It is a two-story church built of rusticated limestone on a limestone block foundation. It is about 46 by 78 feet (14 m × 24 m) in plan.

"Still woven into the threads of the downtown's built environment, the church is a proud reminder to our citizens that older buildings should be savored not only for their contribution to the past, but also for their potential contributions to the future." Cathy Ambler, Chair Historic Resources Commission

It was built in Gothic Revival style in 1870 by pioneer Kansas architect John G. Haskell (responsible for many Lawrence landmarks as well as the Douglas County Courthouse and Kansas State Capitol). It was at one point slated for demolition, but after a 4-year legal dispute, was purchased by Ashlar LC and restored, through efforts of the Lawrence Historic Preservation Alliance and Kansas State Historical Society. Craig Patterson and Associates architectural firm rehabilitated it and adapted it to reuse as modern office space. On Nov. 6 1993, Governor Joan Finney ceremonially reopened the building to its new life. In 1995, it was placed on the National Historic Register. The building next to the old church is the original parsonage.
