= Plymouth Congregational Church (Lawrence, Kansas) =

- U.S. National Register of Historic Places
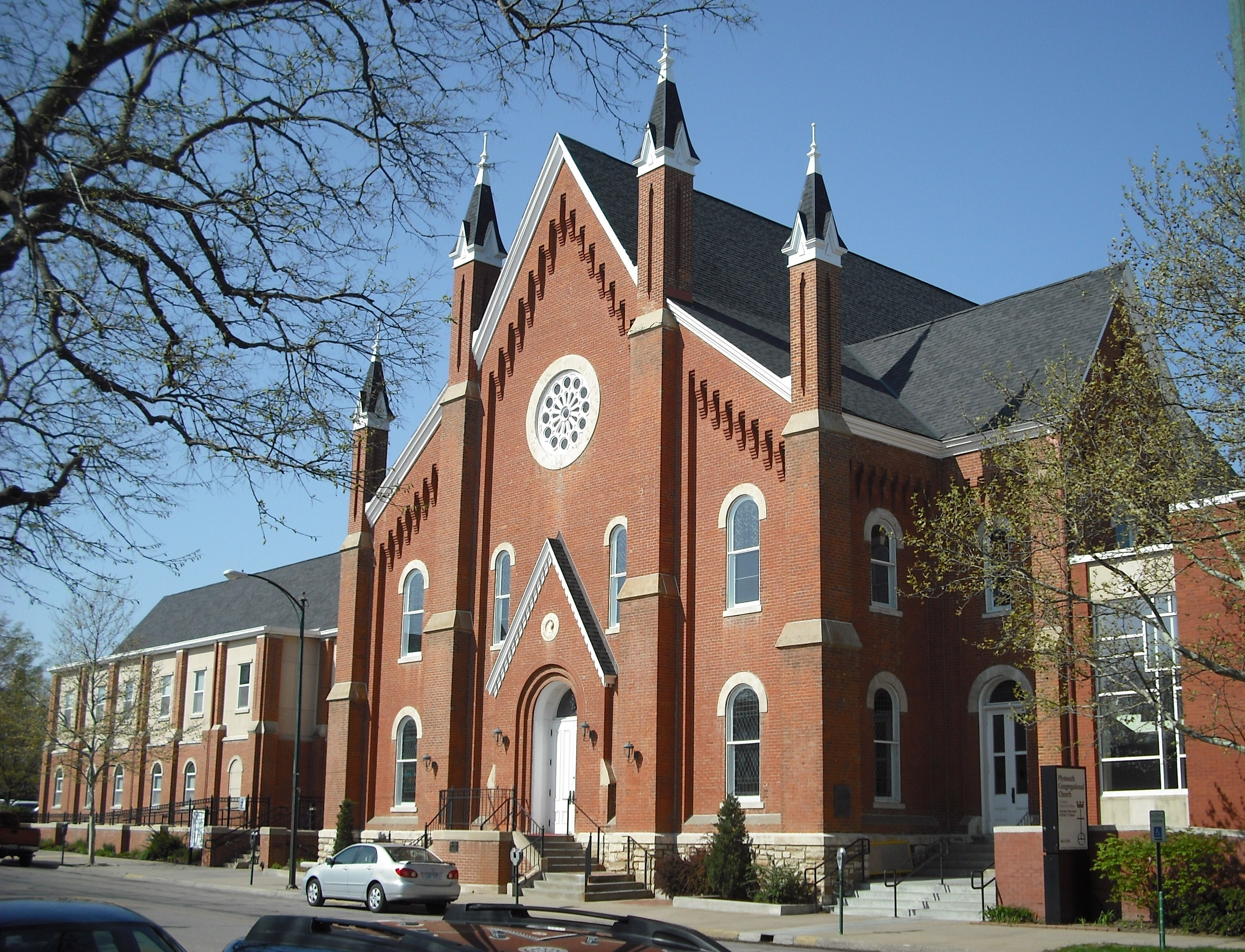
- The church in 2011

- Location within Kansas
- Location: Lawrence, Kansas
- Coordinates: 38°57′59.6″N 95°14′14.5″W
- Built: 1868–1870
- Architect: John G. Haskell
- Architectural style: Victorian with Gothic and Romanesque Revival characteristics
- NRHP reference No.: 09000674
- Added to NRHP: September 2, 2009

Plymouth Congregational Church of Lawrence, Kansas is an affiliate of the United Church of Christ that was established in 1854, months after the Territory of Kansas was opened to settlement. The present-day church building, built in 1870, is listed on the National Register of Historic Places.

The architect was John G. Haskell who was among the architects of the Kansas State Capitol.

== History ==
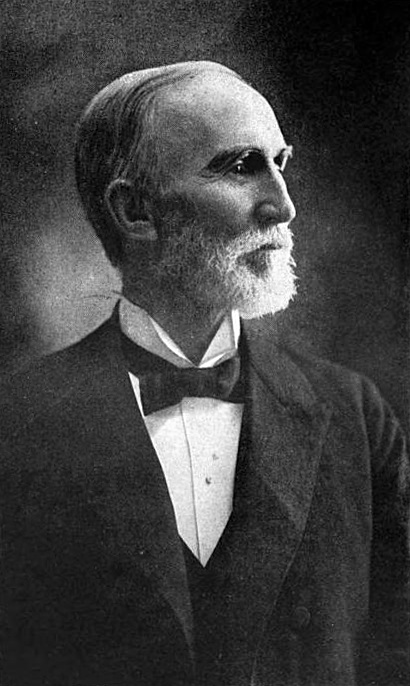
Richard Cordley became pastor in 1857, when the congregation was moved into the then-unfinished "Stone Church."

The Territory of Kansas was opened to settlement by the Kansas–Nebraska Act on May 30, 1854. Reverend Samuel Y. Lum of Middletown, New York was sent by the American Home Missionary Society to establish what was to become the first church in the new city of Lawrence and the entire Kansas Territory. Prior to his arrival, sermon readings were conducted by laymen. The first service of Plymouth Congregational Church was held by Lum on October 1, 1854 in a mudbrick boarding house, also called the "hay tent," with settlers who had come from New England.

Reverend Richard Cordley became pastor in 1857, when the congregation moved into its first permanent building, called the "Stone Church," though it was not completed until 1862. Cordley was an abolitionist and supported the free state movement. During the American Civil War, several members were killed by pro-Confederate forces led by William Quantrill in the Lawrence Massacre of 1863. Cordley's home was burned, but the church building survived without damage. Cordley was influential in documenting such events in the early settlement of Kansas.

=== The Brick Church ===
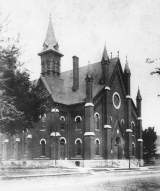
"The Brick Church" shortly after being constructed

The present-day building, also called "The Brick Church," was designed by architect John G. Haskell, who also worked on other churches, schools, and the Kansas State Courthouse. Construction began in 1868 and was completed in May 1870 at a cost of $45,000. The sanctuary windows were made in England. Services have been held regularly in the building since 1870. In 1916, the "Parish House" was added to the structure under then-Pastor Noble Elderkin. It was damaged by fire in 1955, but rebuilt and expanded. Additional renovation work was carried out to different parts of the church in 1992 and 2001.

On July 16, 2009, the building was nominated to the National Register of Historic Places by the Kansas Historical Society. It was listed on the National Register of Historic Places on September 2, 2009. The building's architectural style is described as "an eclectic Victorian-era church building with Gothic and Romanesque Revival characteristics."

== Notable members ==
- Barbara Ballard – Member of the Kansas House of Representatives since 1993.
- Paul Davis – Member of the Kansas House of Representatives from 2009 to 2015. Democratic candidate in 2014 Kansas gubernatorial election.
- Tom Holland – Member of the Kansas senate since 2009. Democratic candidate in 2010 Kansas gubernatorial election.
- Alan Mulally – The president of the Ford Motor Company called the late Rev. Dale Turner "a mentor and an inspiration." Turner, who later moved to the University Congregational United Church of Christ in Seattle, Washington, stayed in contact with Mulally, who also moved to the city to work at Boeing.

== See also ==
- National Register of Historic Places listings in Douglas County, Kansas
