= First Methodist Church of Eudora =

- First Methodist Church
- U.S. National Register of Historic Places
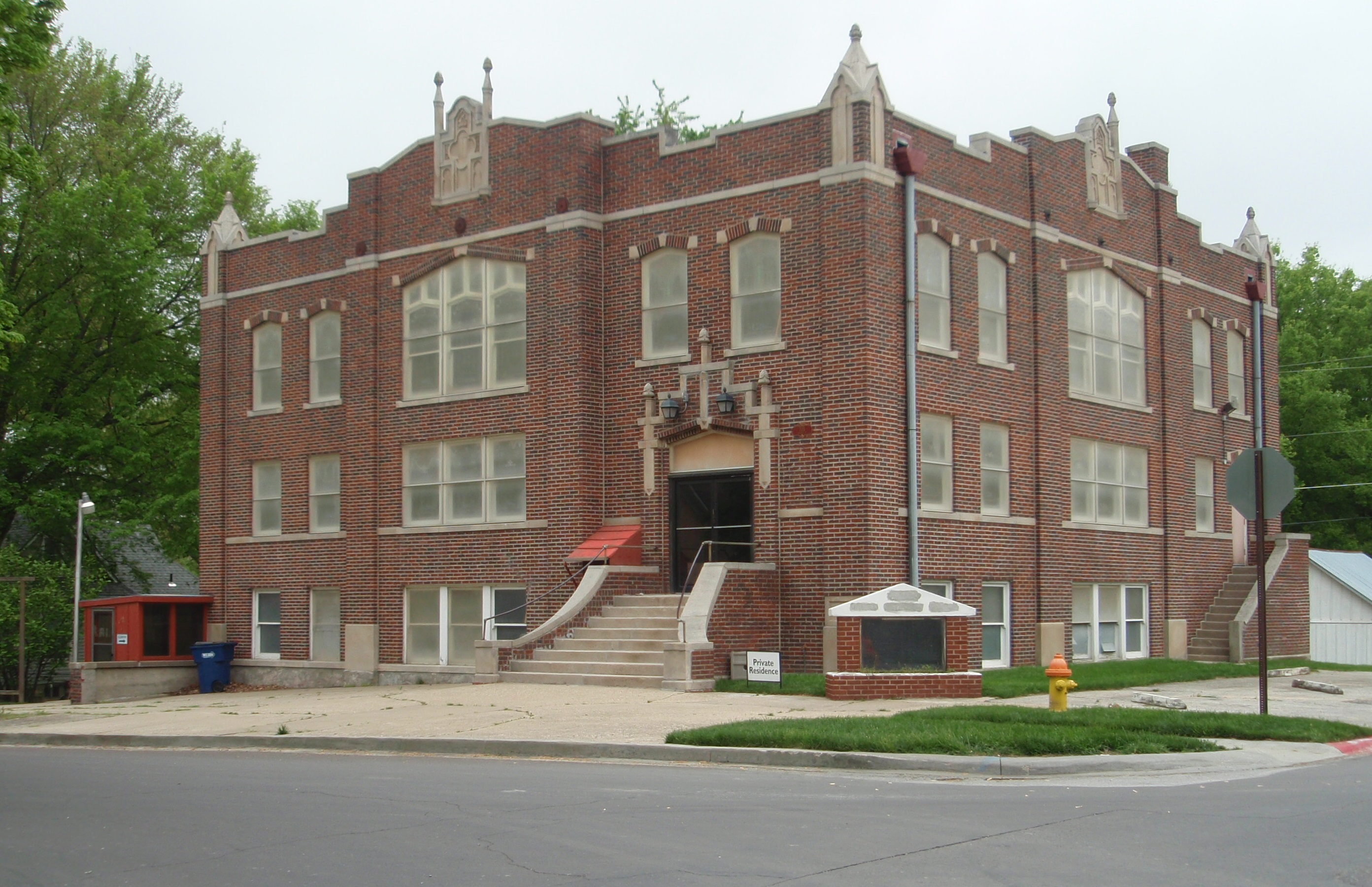
- First Methodist Church building, used as a private residence (before fire damage)

- Location within Kansas Location within the United States
- Location: 703 Church Street; Eudora, Kansas
- Coordinates: 38°56′47″N 95°05′46″W
- Area: Less than one acre
- Built: 1922
- Architect: Walter E. Glover
- Architectural style: Collegiate Gothic
- NRHP reference No.: 100009704
- Added to NRHP: September 3, 2024

The First Methodist Church of Eudora is a historic structure built in 1921–22 in Eudora, Kansas.

== History ==
Worship began in 1922 and the building was formally dedicated in 1924.

Previously the German and English Methodist churches met separately, but as the use of the German language declined there, the two groups merged in 1916 to form the United Methodist (or Methodist Episcopal) Church. A new building was constructed to accommodate the combined membership.

The church was built in a "Collegiate Gothic" style using a modified "Akron Plan", popular in the 1920s. The Akron Plan included a central worship space with Sunday school rooms on the sides that could be opened. The building is generally square, with an entrance on the northeast corner and the pulpit in the opposite corner. Balconies rise on two sides.

Walter E. Glover was the architect. In 1921, Glover was elected president of the State Association of Architects. At least eight buildings he designed (including this one) are listed in the National or State (Kansas) Registers.

While the original cost was projected to be $20,000, ultimately the bill reached $45,000.

=== World War II ===
The building's large basement with high ceilings was used for basketball prior to 1940. During World War II, the population of Eudora dramatically increased due to the opening of the Sunflower Army Ammunition Plant east of town. Nearly 2,000 Sunflower employees moved to Eudora with their families. The 1903 Eudora Public School (elementary school at 626 Church Street) was not able to accommodate all of the children after this influx, and the (nearby) Methodist Church basement held Eudora's first and second grade classes during the war.

=== Later use ===
The Eudora United Methodist Church built a new building in 2006, and sold the original facility to individuals for use as personal property.

The building served as a private residence for several years.

On May 29, 2022, fire severely damaged the building – although it remained structurally intact. As of 2024, new owners began renovations to repair fire damage and make upgrades to turn the facility into a wedding venue.

== State and National Registers ==
The site was listed in the Kansas Register of Historic Places on November 4, 2023. On September 3, 2024, the building gained inclusion on the National Register of Historic Places.
