= Vinland Presbyterian Church =

Historic church in Kansas, United States

- U.S. National Register of Historic Places
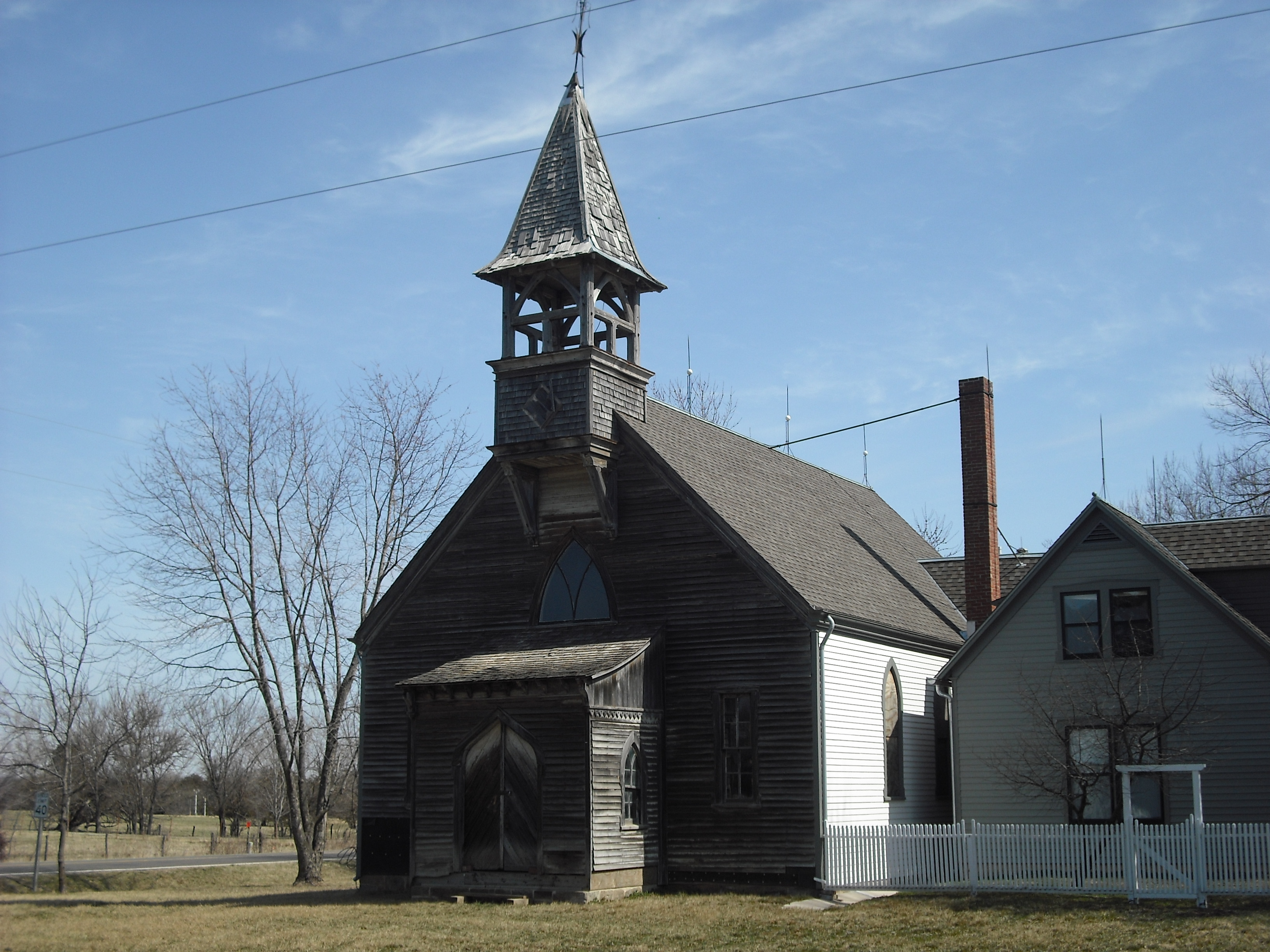

- Location within Kansas Location within the United States
- Nearest city: Baldwin, Kansas
- Coordinates: 38°50′25″N 95°10′56″W
- Area: less than one acre
- Built: 1879
- Architectural style: Gothic Revival
- NRHP reference No.: 03000707
- Added to NRHP: August 4, 2003

Vinland Presbyterian Church is a historic church in Baldwin, Kansas. Its Gothic Revival style building was constructed in 1879 and added to the National Register of Historic Places in 2003.

It was nominated for the National Register on basis of its Gothic Revival architecture, which includes a steep roof, pointed-arch windows, and tower.
