= S. T. Zimmerman House =

Historic house in Kansas, United States

- U.S. National Register of Historic Places
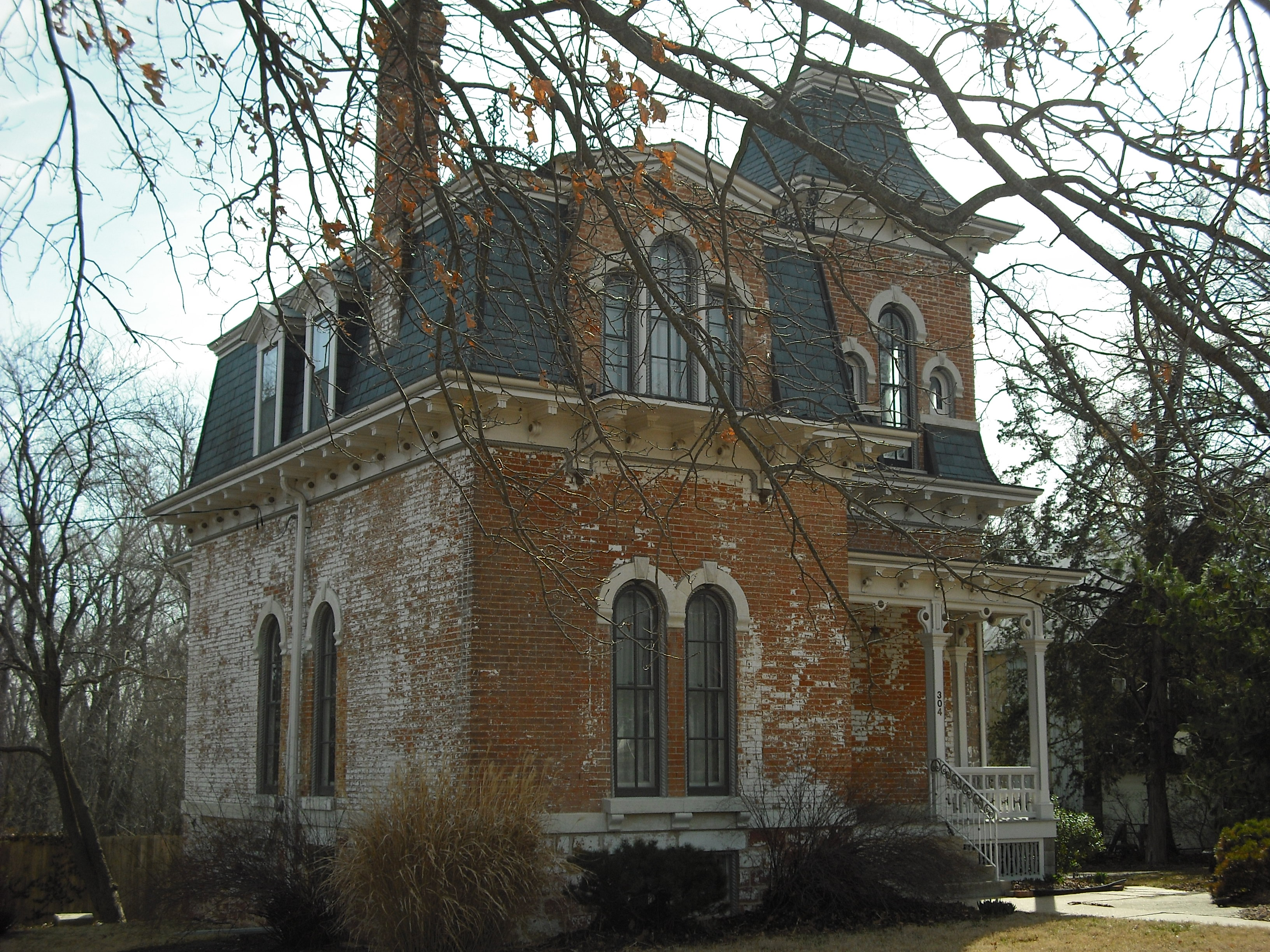

- Location within Kansas Location within the United States
- Location: 304 Indiana St., Lawrence, Kansas
- Coordinates: 38°58′44″N 95°14′35″W
- Area: 1 acre (0.40 ha)
- Built: 1870
- Architectural style: Second Empire
- NRHP reference No.: 74000833
- Added to NRHP: September 6, 1974

The S. T. Zimmerman House is a historic house in Lawrence, Kansas. It was built c. 1870 in Lawrence, Kansas by mill owner S. T. Zimmerman. The Second Empire house is unique in the area for its style. The two-story brick house features a square tower, arched window openings, a bell-cast mansard roof, and extensive wrought iron detailing. The exterior has seen little alteration. The interior is altered in places but substantially intact.

The Zimmerman House was placed on the National Register of Historic Places on September 6, 1974.
