= Douglas County Courthouse (Kansas) =

- U.S. National Register of Historic Places
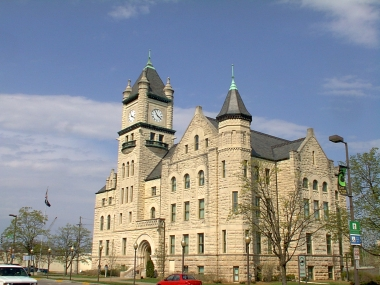

- Location within Kansas Location within the United States
- Interactive map showing the location for Douglas County Courthouse
- Location: SE corner of Massachusetts and 11th Sts., Lawrence, Kansas
- Coordinates: 38°57′48″N 95°14′7″W
- Area: 2 acres (0.81 ha)
- Built: 1903
- Architect: John G. Haskell and Frederick C. Gunn
- Architectural style: Richardsonian Romanesque, Romanesque
- NRHP reference No.: 75000708
- Added to NRHP: April 14, 1975

The Douglas County Courthouse in Lawrence, Kansas is a three-and-a-half-story stone building erected in 1903.

It was designed by noted 19th-century architect John G. Haskell in association with another architect, Frederick C. Gunn.

It is a Richardsonian Romanesque work.

Its "dominant feature" is a six-story-tall square clock tower, with four minarets and a pyramidal roof topped by a metal finial. There is also a smaller octagonal stair tower with an eight-sided roof, topped by another finial. Windows in the stair tower alternate on the five visible sides of the tower.
