= Elizabeth M. Watkins Community Museum =

- Watkins Museum of History
- U.S. National Register of Historic Places
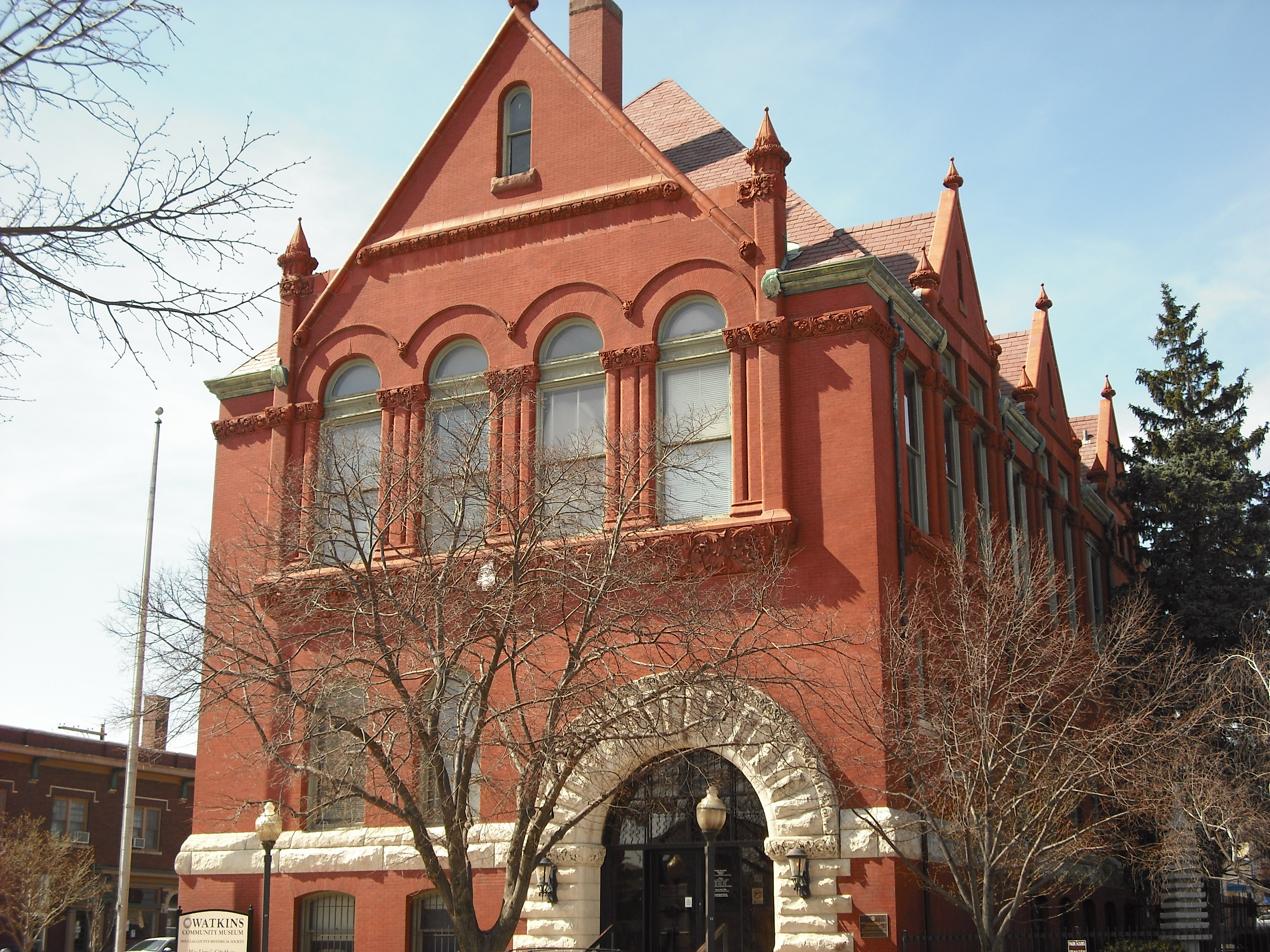
- The Watkins Museum of History

- Location within Kansas
- Location: 1047 Massachusetts St, Lawrence, Kansas
- Coordinates: 38°57′51″N 95°14′09″W
- Architectural style: Richardsonian Romanesque, Romanesque
- NRHP reference No.: 71000311
- Added to NRHP: February 24, 1971

The Watkins Museum of History is a museum in Lawrence, Kansas that is managed by the Douglas County Historical Society. It provides programs and public events, educational resources and activities, and changing exhibits about the heritage of Douglas County.

== History ==
In 1888, Watkins National Bank opened at 11th and Massachusetts. Founded by Jabez B. Watkins, the bank would last until 1929. Watkin's wife Elizabeth donated the bank building to the city to use as a city hall. By 1970, City Hall had moved to a new location and after extensive renovations, the Watkins Building reopened in 1975 as the Elizabeth M. Watkins Community Museum. It was later renamed the Watkins Museum of History. According to the museum's website: "A classic example of the Richardsonian Romanesque influence on Kansas's architecture, it was considered one of the most magnificent buildings west of the Mississippi River at the time of its construction."

== See also ==
- List of mayors of Lawrence, Kansas
