= Assemblage (art) =

Art form and technique

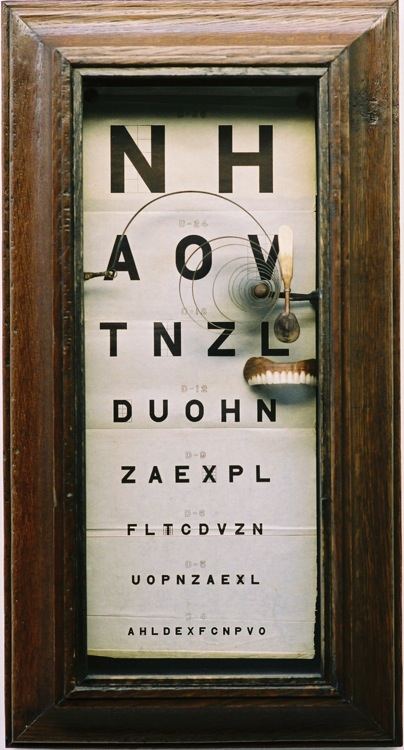
Johann Dieter Wassmann (Jeff Wassmann), Vorwarts! (Go Forward!), 1897 (2003)

Assemblage is an artistic form or medium usually created on a defined substrate that consists of three-dimensional elements projecting out of or from the substrate. It is similar to collage, a two-dimensional medium. It is part of the visual arts and it typically uses found objects, but is not limited to these materials. The term also may be applied to free-standing works that have been assembled.

== History ==
The origin of the art form dates to the cubist constructions of Pablo Picasso c. 1912–1914. The origin of the word (in its artistic sense) may be traced back to the early 1950s, when Jean Dubuffet created a series of collages of butterfly wings, which he entitled assemblages d'empreintes. However, Marcel Duchamp, Jean Arp and others had been working with found objects for many years prior to Dubuffet. Russian artist Vladimir Tatlin created his "counter-reliefs" in 1914. Alongside Tatlin, the earliest woman artist to try her hand at assemblage was Elsa von Freytag-Loringhoven, the Dada Baroness. In Paris during the 1920s Alexander Calder, Jose De Creeft, Picasso, and others began making fully 3-dimensional works from metal scraps, found metal objects, and wire. In the U.S., one of the earliest and most prolific assemblage artists was Louise Nevelson, who began creating her sculptures from found pieces of wood in the late 1930s.

In the 1950s and 1960s assemblage started to become more widely known and used. Artists such as Robert Rauschenberg and Jasper Johns started using scrappy materials and objects to make anti-aesthetic art sculptures, a big part of the ideas that make assemblage what it is.

The painter Armando Reverón is one of the first to use this technique when using disposable materials such as bamboo, wires, or kraft paper. In the thirties he made a skeleton with wings of mucilage, adopting this style years before other artists. Later, Reverón made instruments and set pieces such as a telephone, a sofa, a sewing machine, a piano, and even music books with their scores. Jim Gary searched in junk yards for parts that would fit into the design of his sculptures.

In 1961, the exhibition "The Art of Assemblage" was featured at the New York Museum of Modern Art. The exhibition showcased the work of early 20th-century European artists such as Braque, Dubuffet, Marcel Duchamp, Picasso, and Kurt Schwitters alongside Americans Man Ray, Joseph Cornell, Robert Mallary, and Robert Rauschenberg. It also included less well known American West Coast assemblage artists such as George Herms, Bruce Conner, and Edward Kienholz. William C. Seitz, the curator of the exhibition, described assemblages as being made up of preformed natural or manufactured materials, objects, or fragments not intended as art materials.

== Artists primarily or partially known for assemblage ==
- Arman (1928–2007), French artist, sculptor, and painter
- Tal Avitzur (born 1962), an American artist known for his sci-fi and fantasy themed sculptures
- Hans Bellmer (1902–1975), a German artist known for his life-sized female dolls, produced in the 1930s
- Wallace Berman (1926–1976), an American artist known for his verifax collages
- Huma Bhabha (born 1962), a Pakistani-American sculptor, known for her uniquely grotesque, figurative forms that often appear dismembered
- André Breton (1896–1966), a French artist, regarded as a principal founder of Surrealism
- Steve Brudniak (born 1961) American artist, actor, and musician
- John Chamberlain (1927–2011), a Chicago artist known for his sculptures of welded pieces of wrecked automobiles
- Greg Colson (born 1956), an American artist known for his wall sculptures of stick maps, constructed paintings, solar systems, directionals, and intersections
- Joseph Cornell (1903–1972), Cornell, who lived in New York City, is known for his delicate boxes, usually glass-fronted, in which he arranged surprising collections of objects, images of renaissance paintings and old photographs; many of his boxes, such as the famous Medici Slot Machine boxes, are interactive and are meant to be handled
- Jim Gary (1939–2006), an American sculptor who lived in New Jersey is known for his fine, architectural, landscape, and abstracts in steel, stained glass, and hardware, as well as for his internationally traveling museum exhibition of monumental assemblages of close to life-sized dinosaurs and other animals using unaltered automobile parts that reached as much as sixty feet in length
- Rosalie Gascoigne (1917–1999), a New Zealand-born Australian sculptor
- Raoul Hausmann (1886–1971), an Austrian artist and writer and a key figure in Berlin Dada, his most famous work is the assemblage Der Geist Unserer Zeit – Mechanischer Kopf (Mechanical Head [The Spirit of Our Age]), c. 1920
- Romuald Hazoumé (born 1962), a contemporary artist from the Republic of Bénin, who exhibits widely in Europe and the U.K.
- Władysław Hasior (1928-1999), a Polish artist, known for his disturbing assemblages, monuments and performances
- George Herms (born 1935), an American artist known for his assemblages, works on papers, and theater pieces
- Louis Hirshman (1905–1986), a Philadelphia artist known for his use of 3-D materials on flat substrates for caricatures of the famous, as well as for collages and assemblages of everyday life, archetypes, and surreal scenes
- Robert H. Hudson (born 1938), an American artist
- Irma Hünerfauth (1907—1998), a German artist, known for her combine paintings, collages, and assemblages, scrap sculptures, machines, and kinetic art from found objects
- Jasper Johns (born 1930), an American Pop artist, painter, printmaker, and sculptor
- Edward Kienholz (1927–1994), an American artist who collaborated with his wife, Nancy Reddin Kienholz, creating free-standing, large-scale "tableaux" or scenes of modern life such as the Beanery, complete with models of persons, made of discarded objects
- Svetlana Kopystiansky (born 1950), American artist
- Igor Kopystiansky (born 1954), American artist
- Lubo Kristek (born 1943), a Czech artist known for his critical assemblages of bones, traps, material cast out by the sea, waste, and mobile telephones (destructed in a happening)
- Jean-Jacques Lebel (born 1936), in 1994 installed a large assemblage entitled Monument à Félix Guattari in the Forum of the Centre Pompidou
- Janice Lowry (1946–2009), American artist known for biographical art in the form of assemblage, artist books, and journals, which combined found objects and materials with writings and sketches
- Ondrej Mares (1949–2008), a Czech-Australian artist and sculptor best known for his 'Kachina' figures – a series of works
- Markus Meurer (born 1959), a German artist, known for his sculptures from found objects
- Louise Nevelson (1899–1988), an American artist, known for her abstract expressionist "boxes" grouped together to form a new creation; she used found objects or everyday discarded things in her "assemblages" or assemblies, one of which was three stories high
- Minoru Ohira (born 1950), a Japanese-born artist
- Meret Oppenheim (1913–1985), a German-born Swiss artist, identified with the Surrealist movement
- John Outterbridge (1933–2020), an American artist known for his pioneering work in assemblage; Outterbridge’s sculptures, created from found objects and discarded materials, explored themes of African American identity, history, and social justice; he was a key figure in the Los Angeles Black Arts Movement and served as the director of the Watts Towers Art Center
- Wolfgang Paalen (1905–1959), an Austrian-German-Mexican surrealist artist and theorist, founder of the magazine DYN and known for several assembled objects, f.e. Nuage articulé
- Noah Purifoy (1917–2004), an African-American visual artist and sculptor, co-founder of the Watts Towers Art Center, and creator of the Noah Purifoy Outdoor Desert Art Museum; he is best known for his assemblage sculpture, including a body of work made from charred debris and wreckage collected after the Watts Riots of August 1965
- Sara Rahbar (born 1976), sculptor, collagist, mixed media artist, best known for her flag series
- Robert Rauschenberg (1925–2008), painter and collagist known for his mixed media works during six decades
- Fred H. Roster (born 1944), an American sculptor
- Betye Saar (born 1926), American visual artist primarily known for her assemblages with family memorabilia, stereotyped African American figures from folk culture and advertising, mystical amulets and charms, and ritual and tribal objects
- Alexis Smith (born 1949) is an American artist best known for assemblages and installations
- Daniel Spoerri (born 1930), a Swiss artist, known for his "snare pictures" in which he captures a group of objects, such as the remains of meals eaten by individuals, including the plates, silverware, and glasses, all of which are fixed to the table or board, which is then displayed on a wall
- Vladimir Tatlin (1885–1953), a Russian artist known for his counter-reliefs—structures made of wood and iron for hanging in wall corners in the 1910s
- Jeffrey Vallance (born 1955), an American artist known for his assemblages, drawings, sculptures, paintings and conceptual art
- Wolf Vostell (1932–1998), known for his use of concrete in his work. In his environments, video installations, and paintings he used television sets and concrete, as well as telephones, real cars, and pieces of automobiles
- Gordon Wagner (1915–1987), was a pioneer in American assemblage art, who was known for his bazaar art, painting, poetry, and writing
- Jeff Wassmann (born 1958), an American-born contemporary artist who works in Australia under the nom de plume of the pioneering German modernist Johann Dieter Wassmann (1841–1898)
- Tom Wesselmann (1931–2004), an American Pop artist, painter, sculptor, and printmaker
- H. C. Westermann (1922–1981), an American sculptor and printmaker
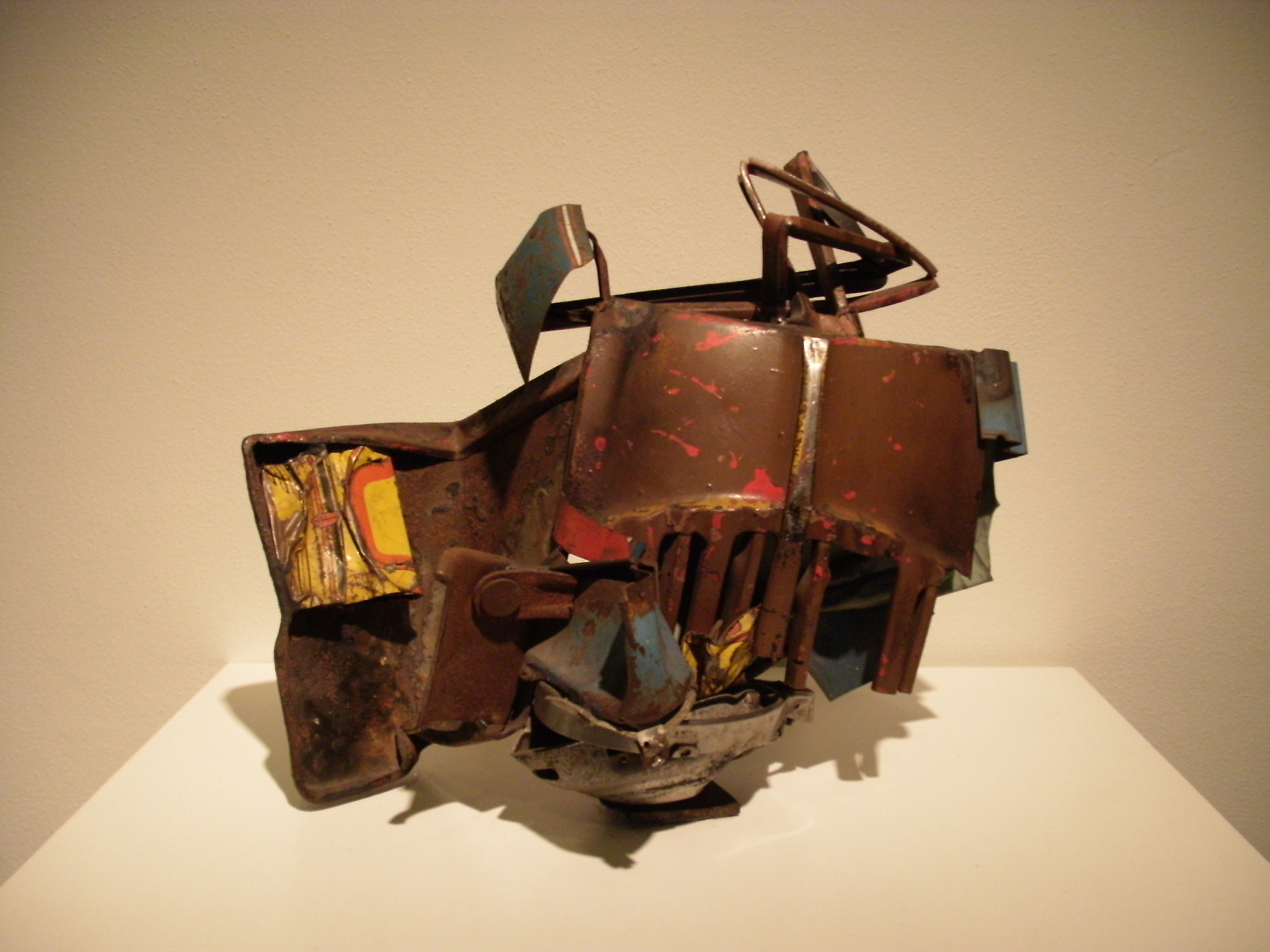
John Chamberlain, S, 1959, in the Hirshhorn Museum and Sculpture Garden

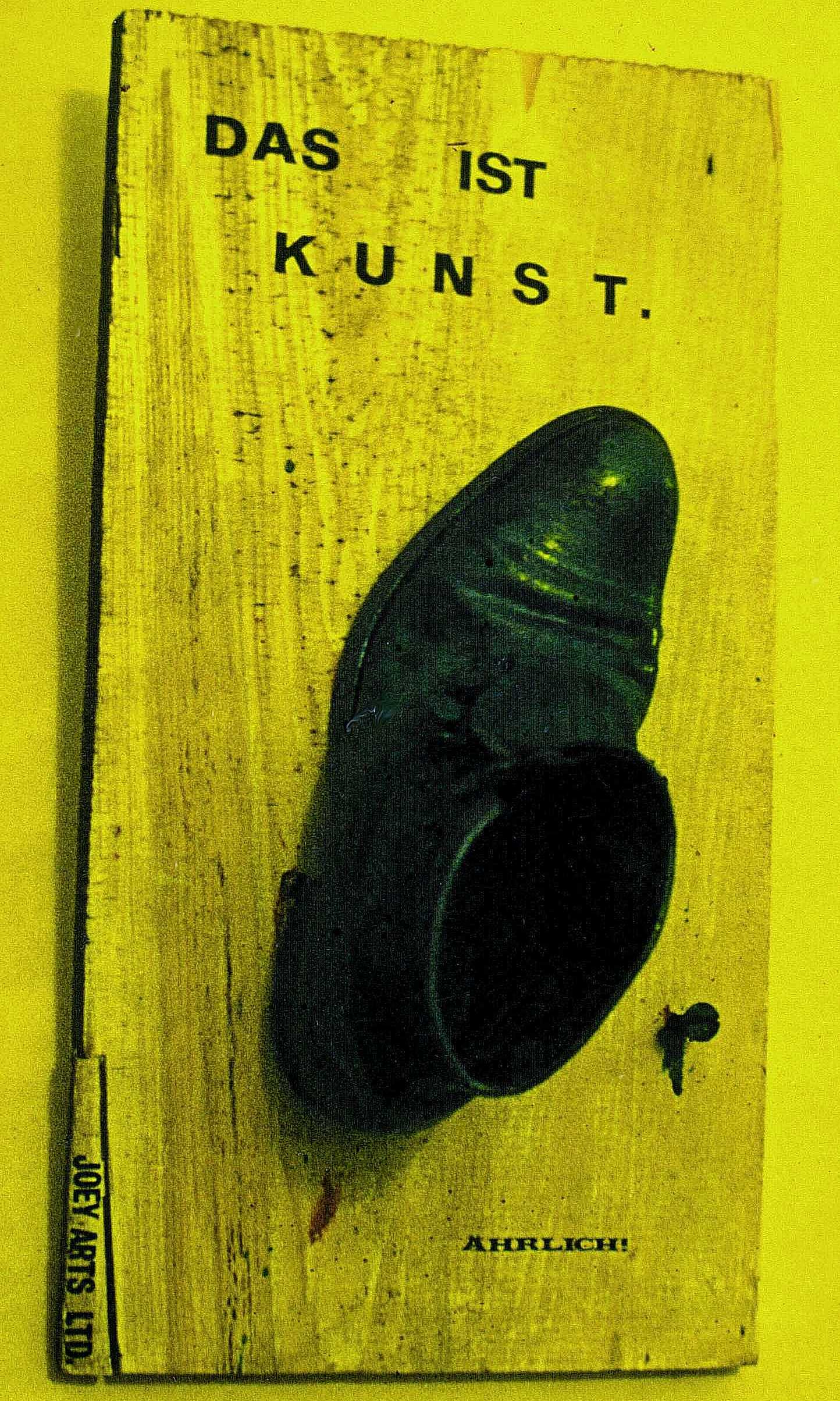
Werner Stürenburg, Nr. 5, 1968

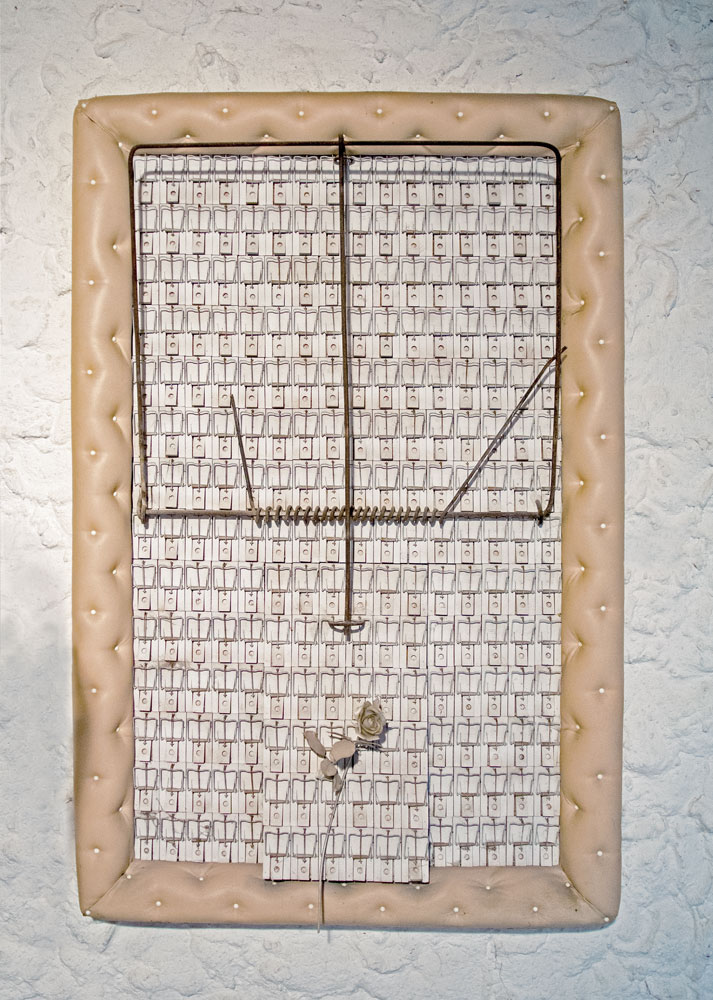
Lubo Kristek, Soundproof Aesthetic of Luxuriety, 1976

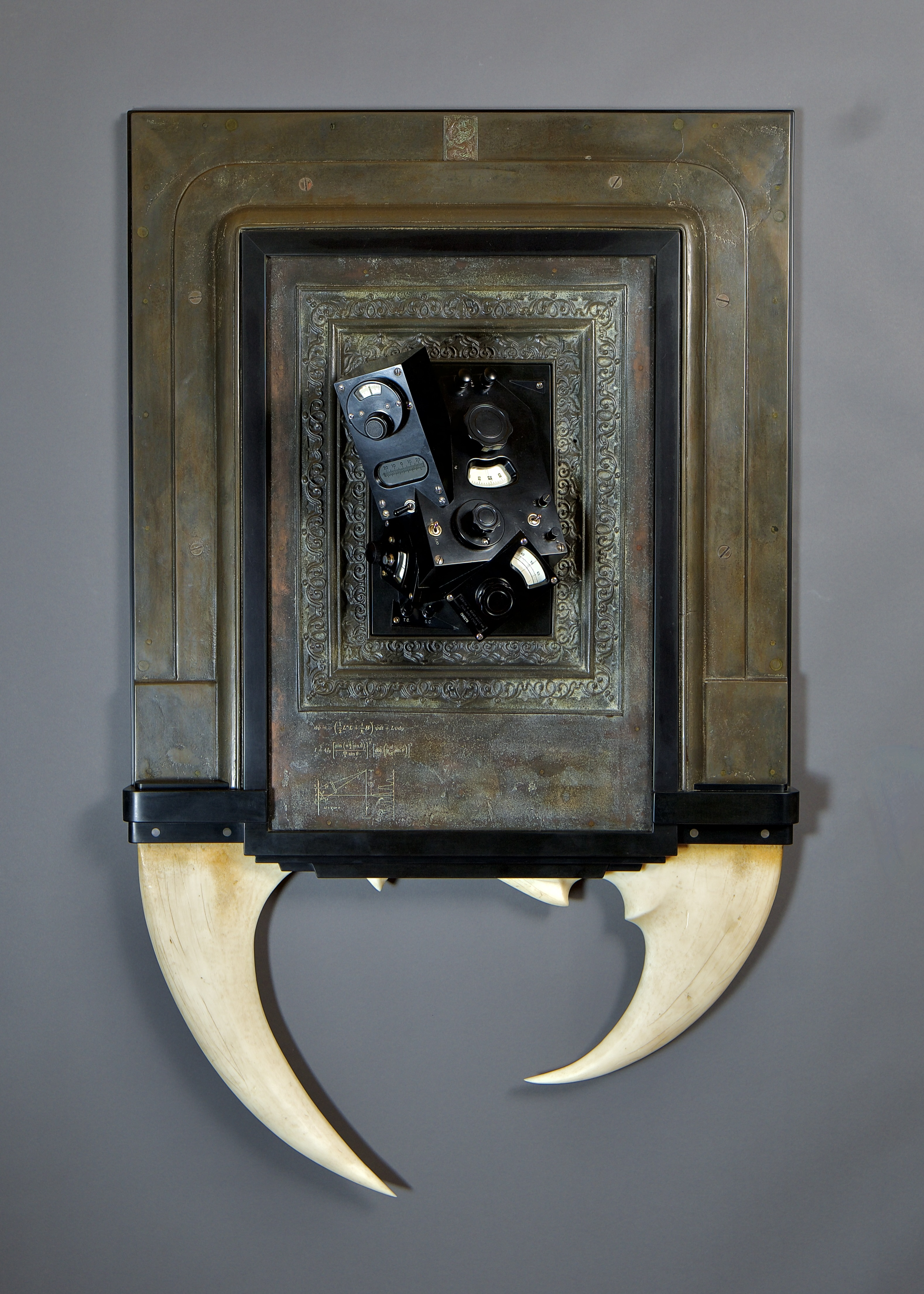
Steve Brudniak, Ontological Catastrophe (2019), antique electronic test equipment, engraved cast iron, carved phenolic and ABS plastics, 51 x 31 x 7 in.

== See also ==
- Bricolage
- Combine paintings of Robert Rauschenberg
- Decollage
- Mixed media
- Neo-Dada
- Unreadymade in Neomaterialism—see Joshua Simon (writer)#Neomaterialism
