= Kristek House =

Artwork by Lubo Kristek, monumental assemblage

- Kristkův dům
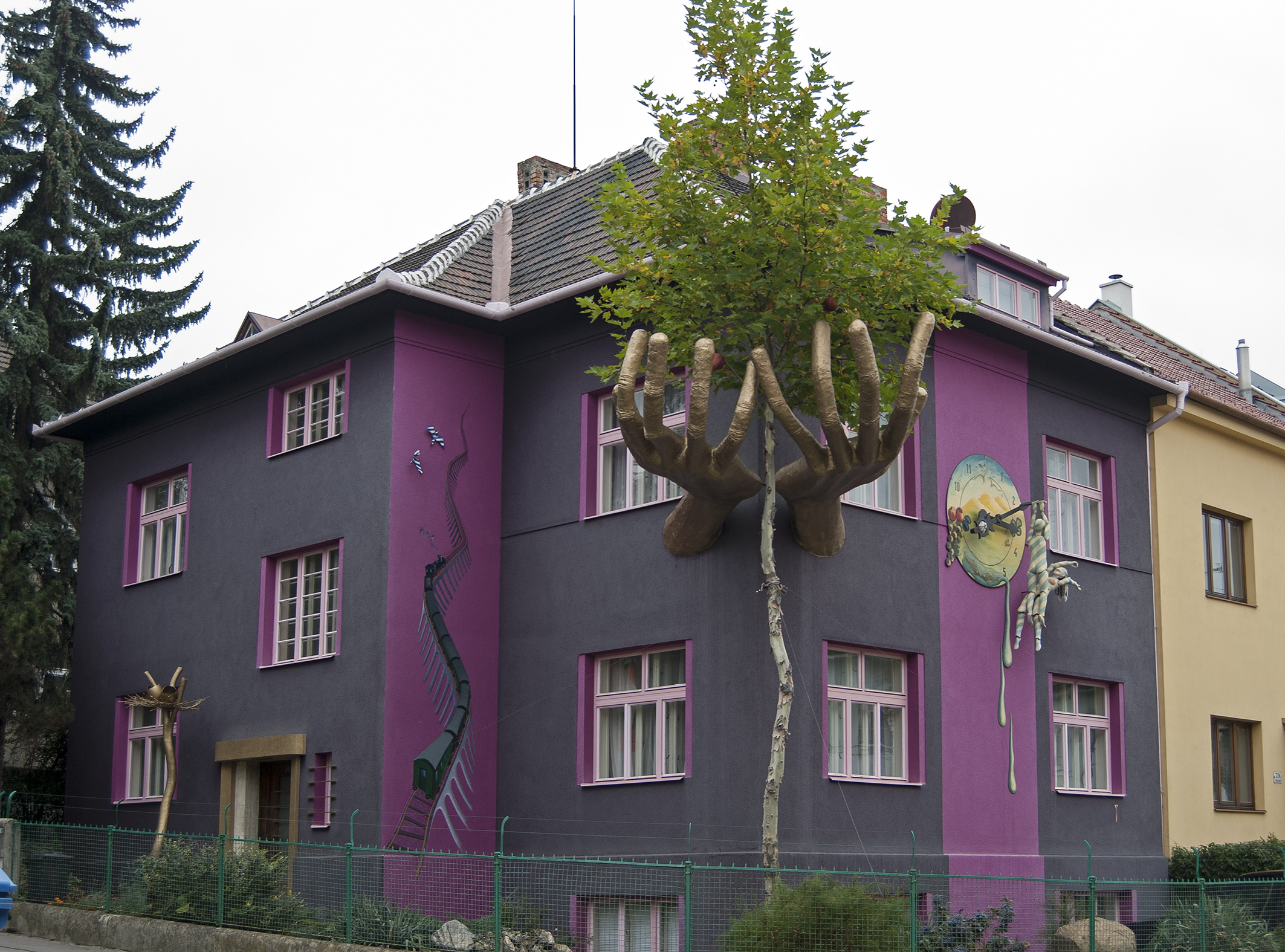

General information
- Address: Tišnovská 77, 613 00 Brno
- Town or city: Brno
- Country: Czech Republic
- Coordinates: 49°12′37″N 16°37′31″E

Design and construction
- Architect(s): Lubo Kristek

Kristek House (Czech: Kristkův dům) is a building on the corner of Tišnovská and Trávníky Streets in Brno, Czech Republic that was transformed into a monumental assemblage by the Czech sculptor, painter, and action artist Lubo Kristek. Kristek created the work between 2015 and 2017.

== Description ==
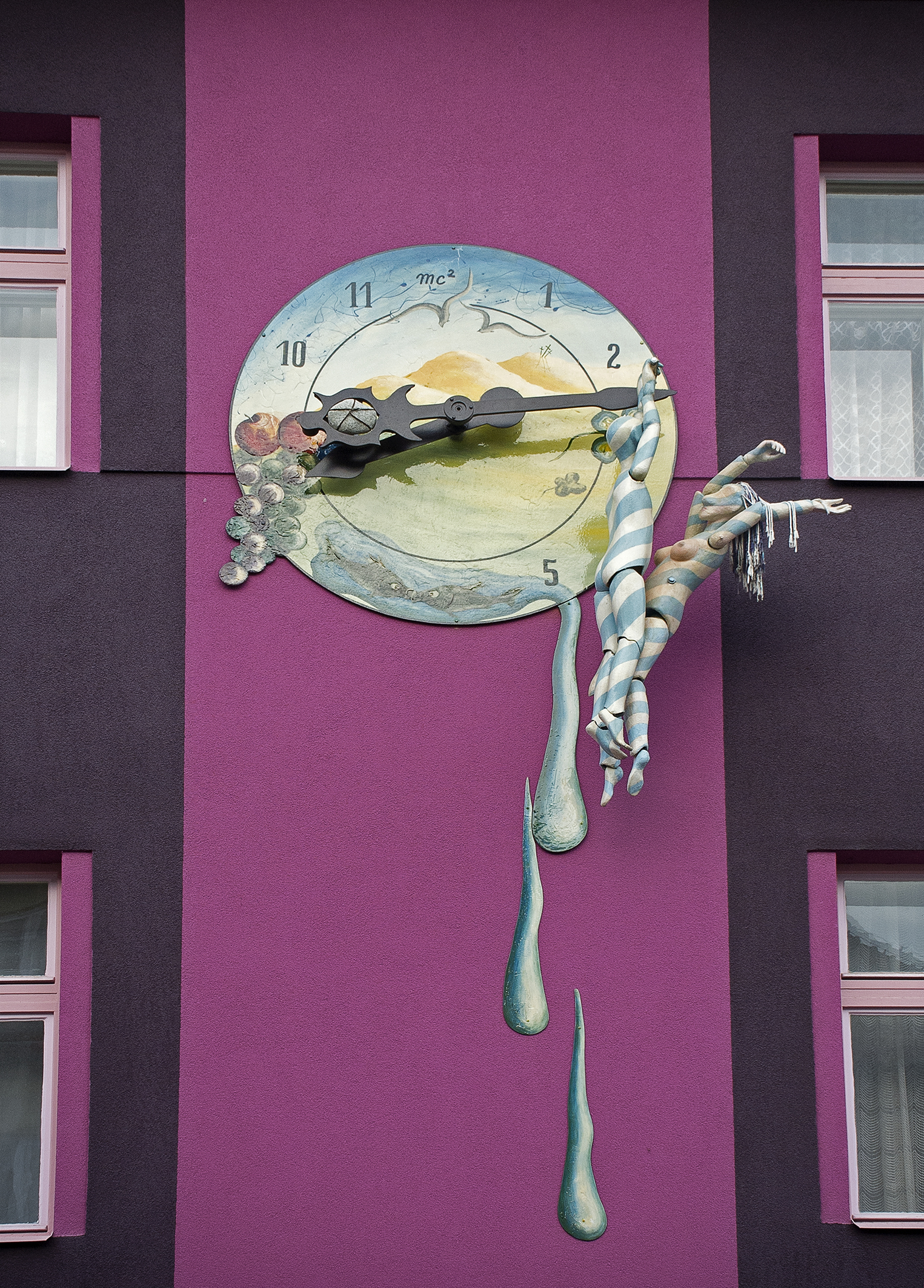
Sisyphus' Time Machine at the Kristek House

A main feature of the house is a surrealist-inspired clock based on the Myth of Sisyphus. Kristek was inspired by Albert Camus and his Myth of Sisyphus and by the ideas of George Voskovec recorded on the LP Relativně Vzato.

The clockwork was designed and constructed especially for this purpose by the Elekon company (Vyškov), a specialist in public clocks. The system provides exact time and incorporates a changeover to winter time.

Another aspect of Kristek House is a railway line is painted on the façade and incorporated into one of the artist's important symbols – the heavenly highway. This symbol can be found already in his painting The Heavenly Highway of Aunt Fränzi (1974) that is today part of the collection of Neues Stadtmuseum in Landsberg am Lech. train from Kristek's childhood, the former Brno-Tišnov railway line (in Czech: Tišnovka).

At the corner of the house, two large sculptures of golden hands rise with their palms turned upwards. The hands also protect the living tree and together represent the central symbol of the monumental assemblage.

Kristek House was the set for the films Ab ovo and Sisyphiade.
