= Lubo Kristek =

Czech-German sculptor, painter and performance artist

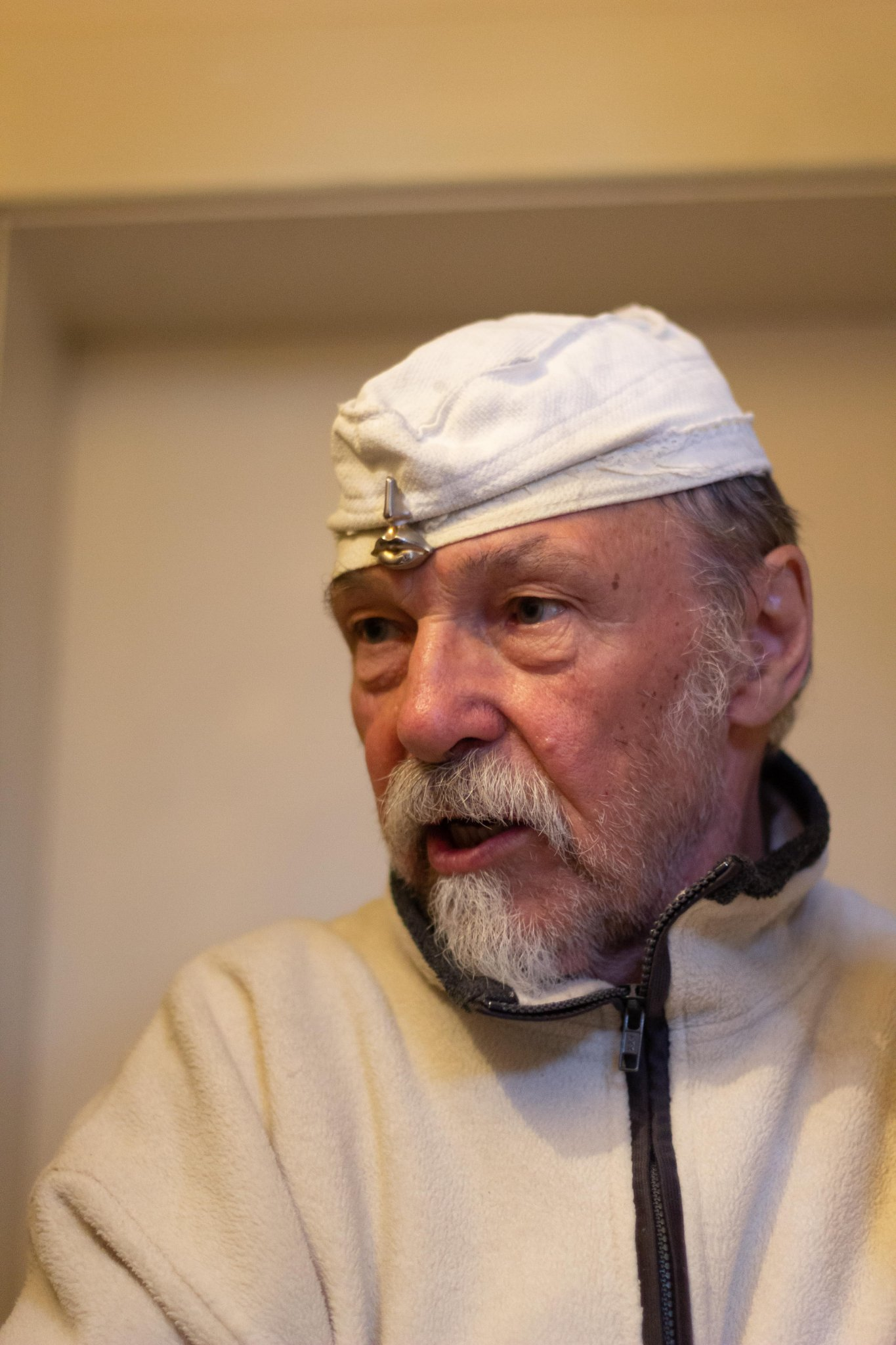
- Born: 8 May 1943 (age 81); Brno, Bohemia and Moravia
- Known for: Painting, sculpture, performance art
- Notable work: Tree of Knowledge (1981); Monument to the Five Senses (1991); Kristek Thaya Glyptotheque (2006); Requiem for Mobile Telephones (2007–2010)
- Movement: Assemblage, surrealism, post-modern, happening, avant-garde, performance art

Lubo Kristek (born 8 May 1943) is a sculptor, painter, and performance artist of Czech origin, who lived in West Germany from 1968 until the 1990s. He specializes in critical assemblages and happenings, in which he incorporates multiple forms of media. He created sculptures for public space. He is the author of a three-state sculptural pilgrims' way. During his more than half-century long work in the field of performance art, he formulated his theory of "holographic perception".

== Life ==
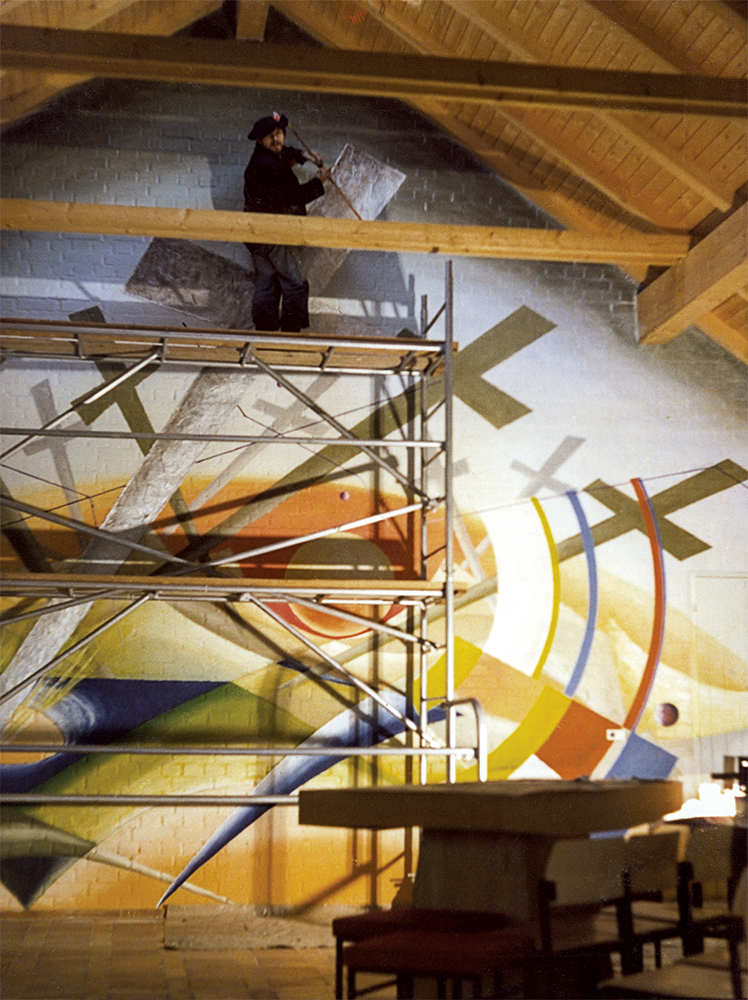
Lubo Kristek creating in the Penzing cemetery chapel (in 1977).

In the 1960s, Kristek lived in a former soap factory, in Hustopeče, where he organised events incorporating music, visual art, poetry, theatre and improvisation. Testing of borders, experiments, and crossing the conventional frame is typical for his work. He follows the idea of a total work of art – Gesamtkunstwerk. At that time, he also experimented with using fire as a means of expression. He deliberately suppressed or sometimes annulled his artistic handwriting.

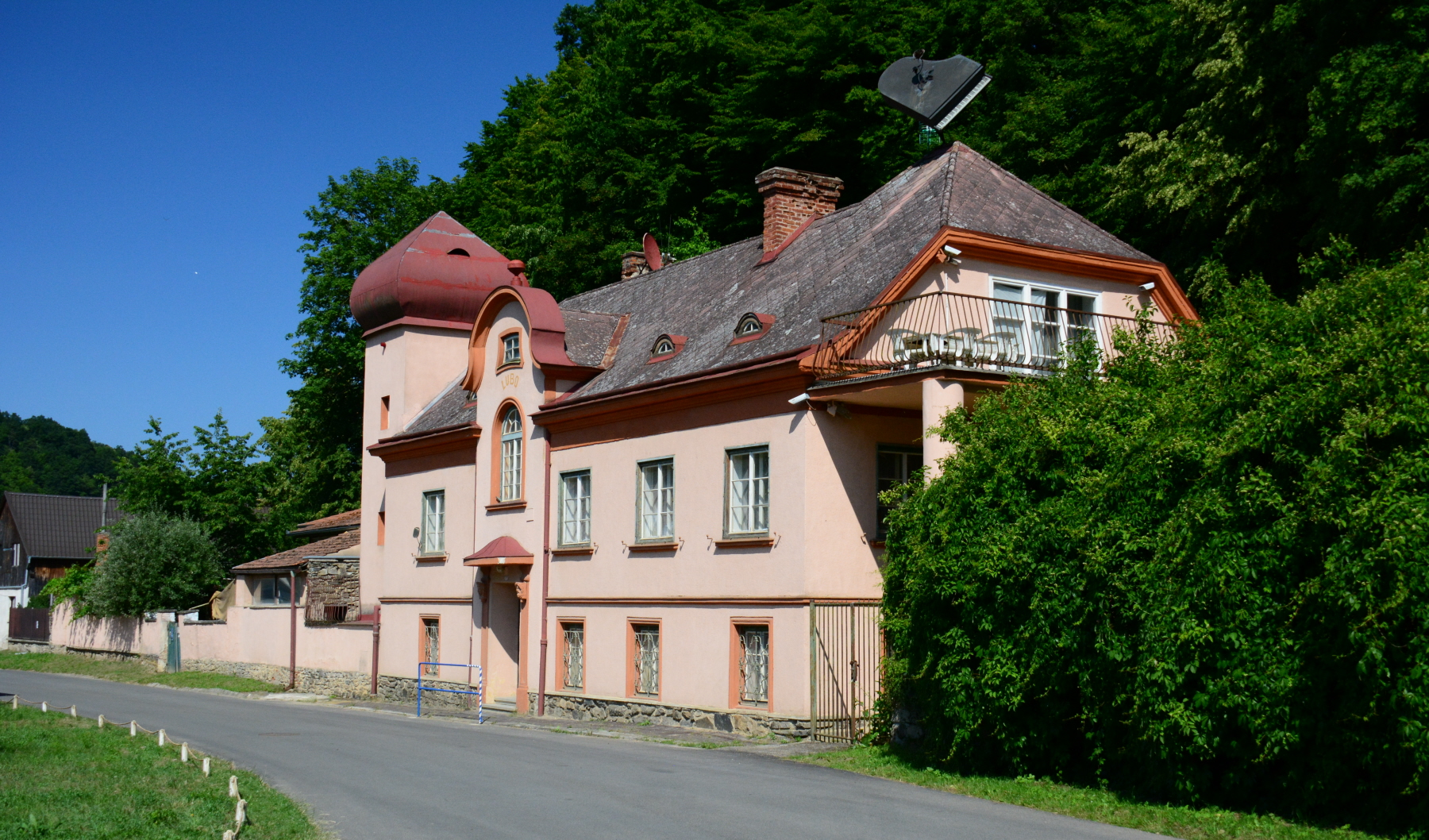
Divine Ephemerality of Tone (1994), Podhradí nad Dyjí

In 1968, Kristek emigrated to West Germany. He settled in Landsberg am Lech and lived there for almost three decades. That was also where he started the tradition of Kristek's Night Vernissages, from which his happenings evolved. From Landsberg, Kristek travelled to other places in Europe (Belgium, Luxembourg, Liechtenstein, the Netherlands, France, Italy, Spain, Republic of San Marino, Switzerland, Austria) to study and create.

Kristek was influenced by Arno Lehmann who lived in Salzburg, where Kristek used to go to meet him. In 1973, after Lehmann's death, Kristek created the sculpture Soul shaped by flame. A sphere dominates the top as a symbol of artistic heritage that Kristek adopted from Lehmann.

He was also influenced by the Austrian ethologist Eberhard Trumler (1923–1991), especially by the mechanisms of survival of the species. Kristek's existencial assemblage Expecting (1969) was created under this influence.

In 1977, Kristek travelled through the west coast of the United States and Canada with his exhibition tour American Cycle 77.

In 1989, after the Velvet Revolution, he returned to Czechoslovakia. He settled in Podhradí nad Dyjí in a house where there is a gallery of his works today (Lubo Chateau). On the apex of the house, he located the sculpture Divine Ephemerality of Tone – a piano balancing on one leg. Writer Jaromír Tomeček unveiled the sculpture in 1994 and, on the basis of the artwork's title, he called the entire neighbouring area of the Thaya Kristek Valley of the Divine Ephemerality of Tone. Václav Jehlička wrote in this context in his foreword for the publication issued by the Neues Stadtmuseum, Landsberg am Lech in 2008:

In his manifestations, Kristek balances on a fragile node that joins various styles and means of expression. Even one of his life symbol is such – a piano rearing up on one leg on the top of the roof of his studio in the Czech Republic.

== Sculpture ==
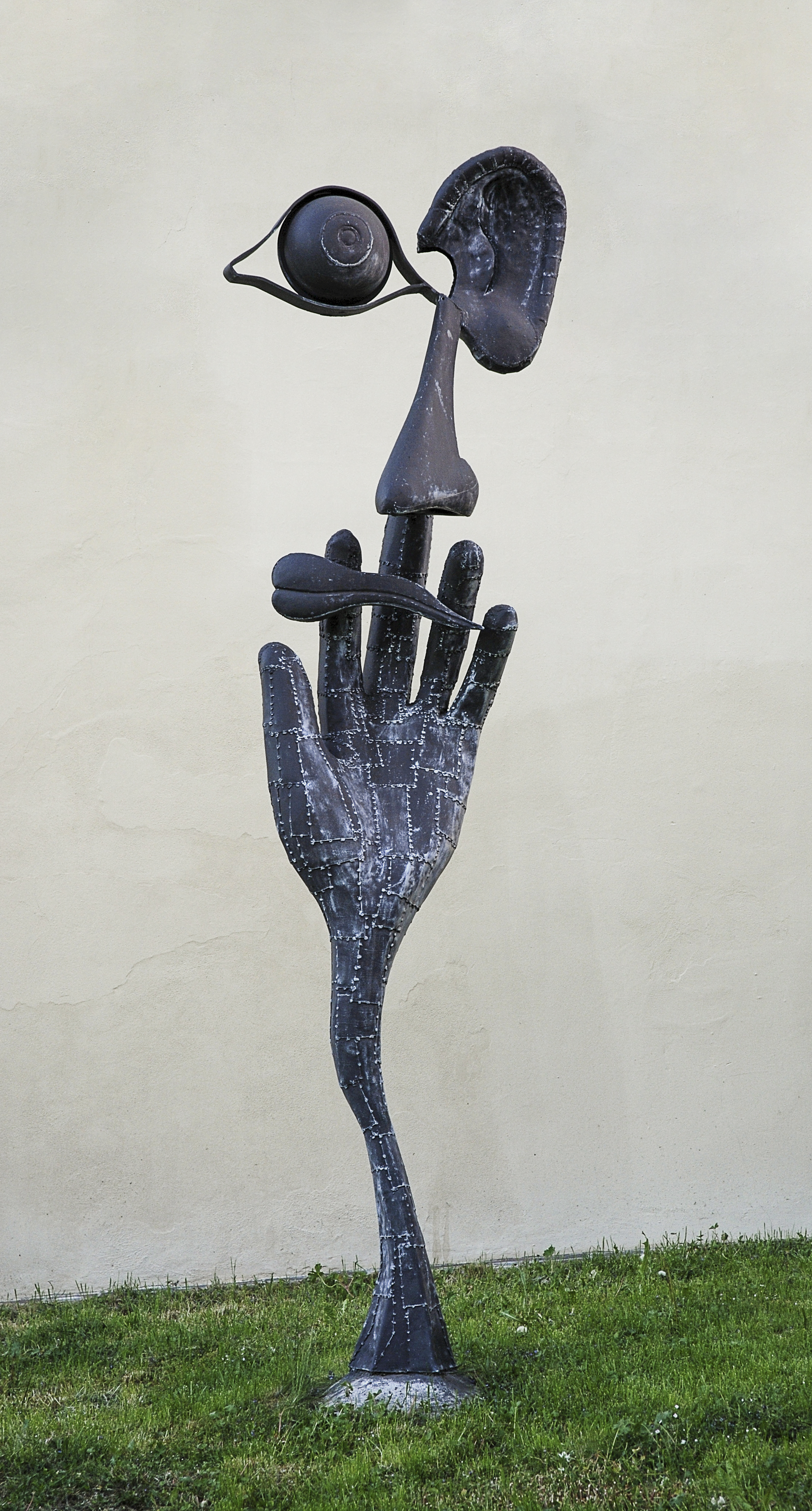
Monument to the Five Senses (1991), Neues Stadtmuseum, Landsberg am Lech.

Kristek made sculptures in several techniques, such as bronze casting, repoussé and chasing, welding and combined techniques using materials like stone, wood, metal, ceramic and found objects. His sculptures can be found as public artworks mainly in Germany and the Czech Republic.

His 1978 ceramic sculpture Birth and Simultaneously Damnation of the Sphere, is today located, as a public work of art, in a chapel at the John's Castle near Podivin, Czech Republic.

Kristek's 16-metre-high sculpture Tree of Knowledge (1981) that he made for the Ignaz-Kögler-Gymnasium (high school) in Landsberg am Lech rises up through three floors of the building. The Munich magazine Steinmetz + Bildhauer noted:

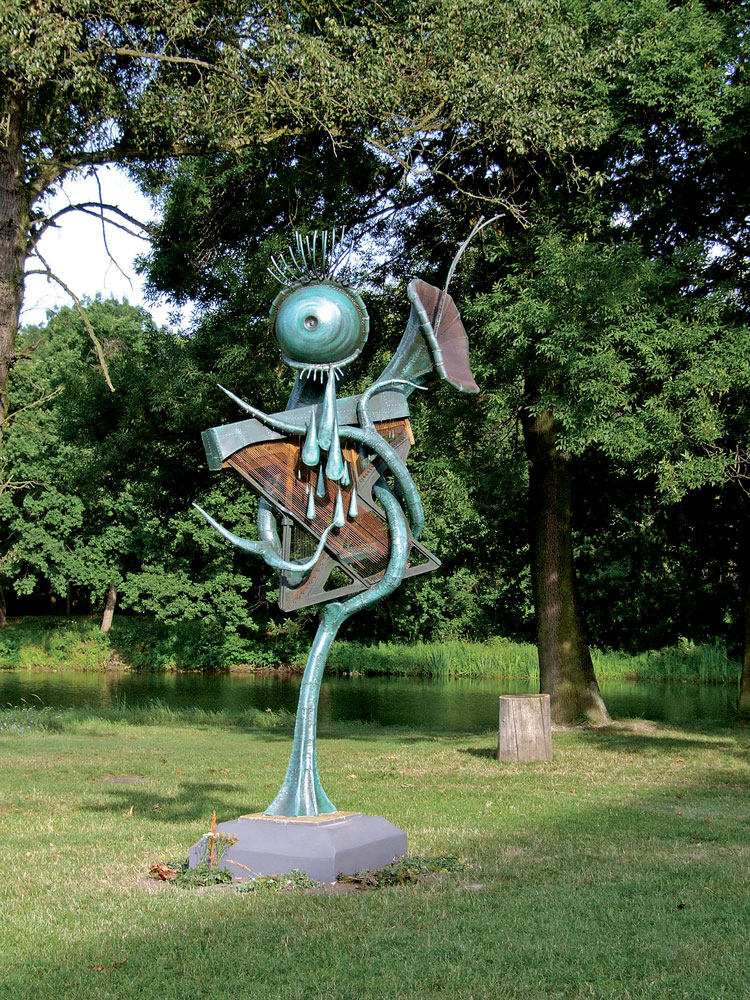
Tree of the Wind Harp (1992), Chateau Pohansko.

One could hardly imagine a more inseparable and fruitful unity of art and architecture. Where could we find, in the field of art in architecture, a comparable example in Rhineland over the last twelve years?

In 1988, Kristek created the bronze fountain The Drinking for the Theresianbad Greifenberg, Germany.

Kristek's metal sculpture Monument to the Five Senses (1991) is part of the collection of the Neues Stadtmuseum, Landsberg am Lech. It is located in front of the museum since 1992.

In 1992, he made a kinetic sculpture called Tree of the Wind Harp. This wind propelled musical artwork is located at the Pohansko Chateau, Czech Republic.

In 2006, Kristek created bronze sculpture The Seekers that was located on the confluence of the rivers Thaya and March. The sculpture was stolen in 2009; only a fragment left. Using the fragment, Kristek created a new metal sculpture for the place and called it The Seekers – Organic Forms. The sculpture was inaugurated in 2015.

The Czech art historian Barbora Putova wrote:

Just like a medieval artist, Kristek personally welds, grinds and carves his sculptures. From many aspects his free-standing statues represent a surreal parallel with the paintings of the Czech painter Mikuláš Medek (1926–1974), the German painter Max Ernst (1891–1976) and the Spanish painter Salvador Dalí. This is documented in particular by Kristek's metal sculptures Monument to the Five Senses (1991) and Tree of the Wind Harp (1992).

=== Kristek Thaya Glyptotheque ===
In 2005–06, he created a sculptural pilgrims' way dedicated to the river Thaya. It runs along the river Thaya through the Czech Republic, Austria and Slovakia. Kristek linked together the sculptures to inspire people to take a walk through the landscape. The route includes eleven stations, which were open by the series of ten happenings. The eleventh's station remains secret as a challenge for the pilgrim. Kristek said that the pilgrims' way "should also be a protection against the devastation of the parent riverbed. If a person experiences culture here, perhaps he will not behave so unkindly to nature." The project was under the auspices and was supported by the five regions of the three states it runs through.

== Critical assemblage ==
Critical assemblages by Lubo Kristek address various social phenomena, such as oppression, consume approach, addiction to new technologies, and the medical ethics.

One of his early assemblages, called Vision – Burning of Christ (1964) belongs to his artworks shaped by flame. The burned Christ symbolizes "melting of faith" in Czechoslovakia at that time.

The assemblage Metastation of Abandoned Tones was created in 1975–76. It is connected to Kristek's emigration from Czechoslovakia to Germany, for which he was sentenced, in absentia, to 1.5 years in prison and the confiscation of all his property in Czechoslovakia. Kristek included his coat and hat in which he was fleeing over the border in 1968 in the assemblage. The piece is exhibited at the Ruegers Palace, Riegersburg, Austria.

Kristek addressed the subject of hidden traps in modern society in his assemblage Soundproof Aesthetic of Luxuriety, which he created in 1976.

In the 1980s, he made assemblages out of objects he found during his wanderings as in Barbed Wire of Christ (1983) created on the coast of Cantabria and Sea Horse (1986) made of material that was cast out by the sea on the Italian coast near Rome. His assemblage On the Landfill of Ages (1994) is made of industrial waste.

Kristek's artwork In the Prematurely Cloned Age of One Planet (2003) is dedicated to the ethical context of cloning. It was also a main motif of his happening Visio Sequentes or Concerning the Prematurely Cloned Age of a Planet that occurred in 2003 in Znojmo, Czech Republic.

In 2015–2017, the artist transformed his house in Brno into a monumental assemblage Kristek House.

Assemblages by Lubo Kristek
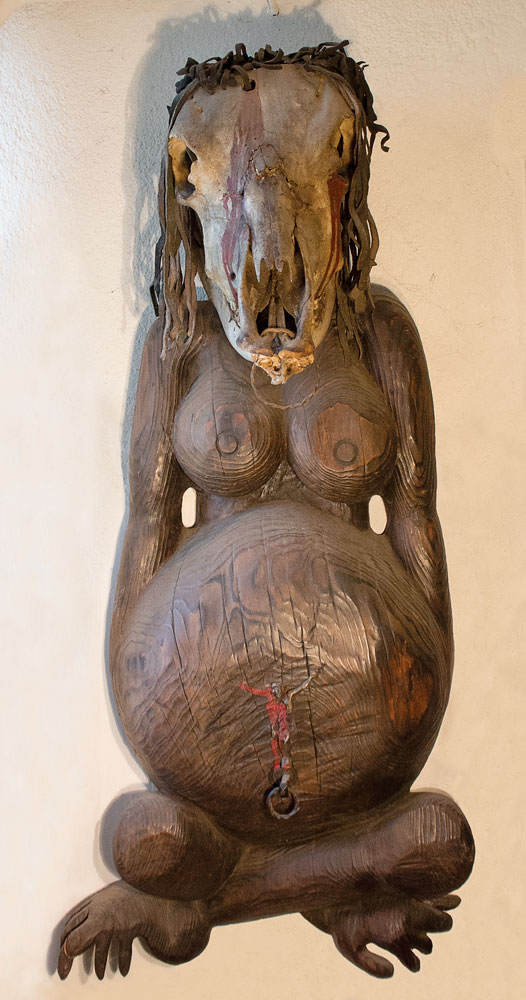
Expecting (1969)

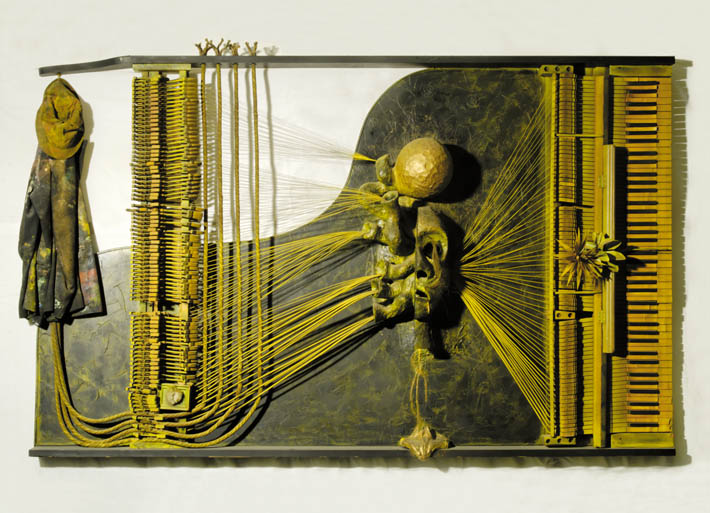
Metastation of Abandoned Tones (1975–76)

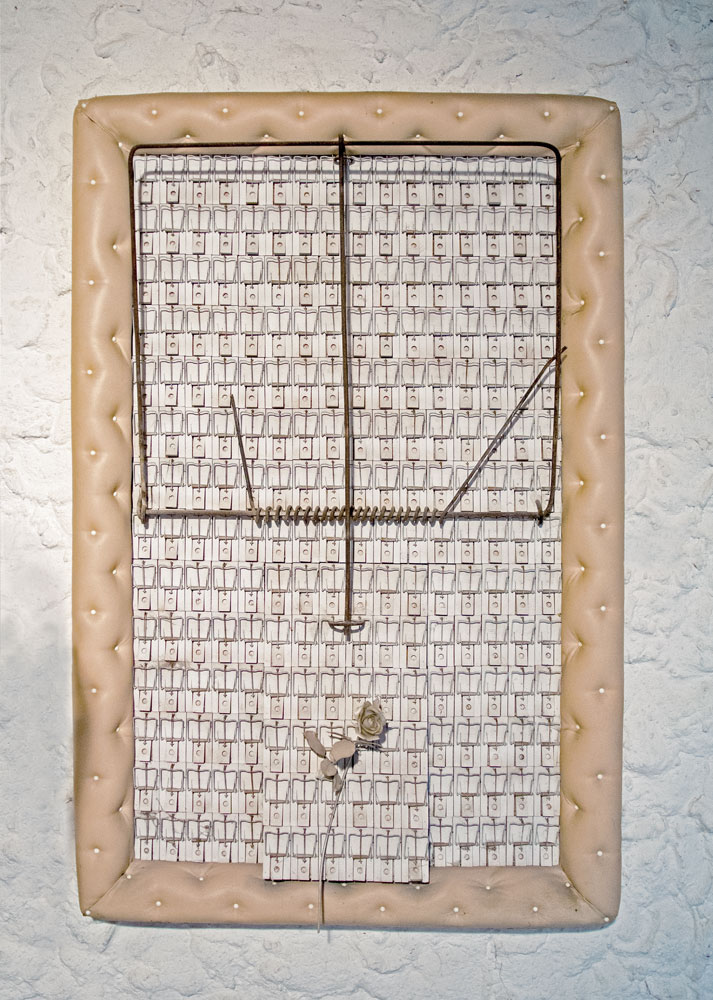
Soundproof Aesthetic of Luxuriety (1976)

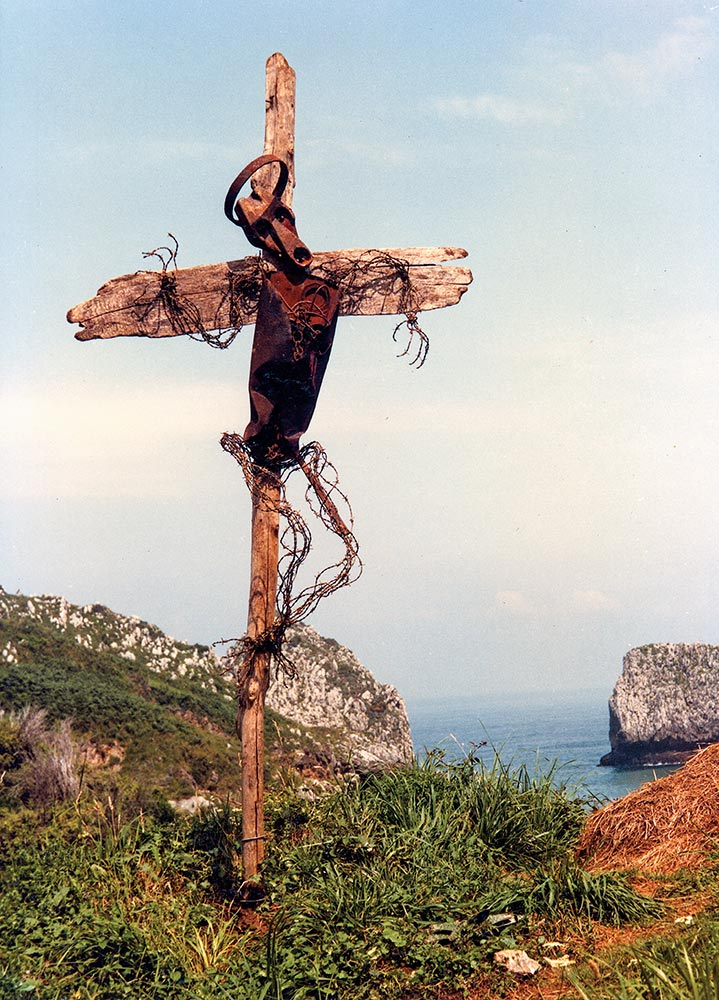
Barbed Wire of Christ (1983)

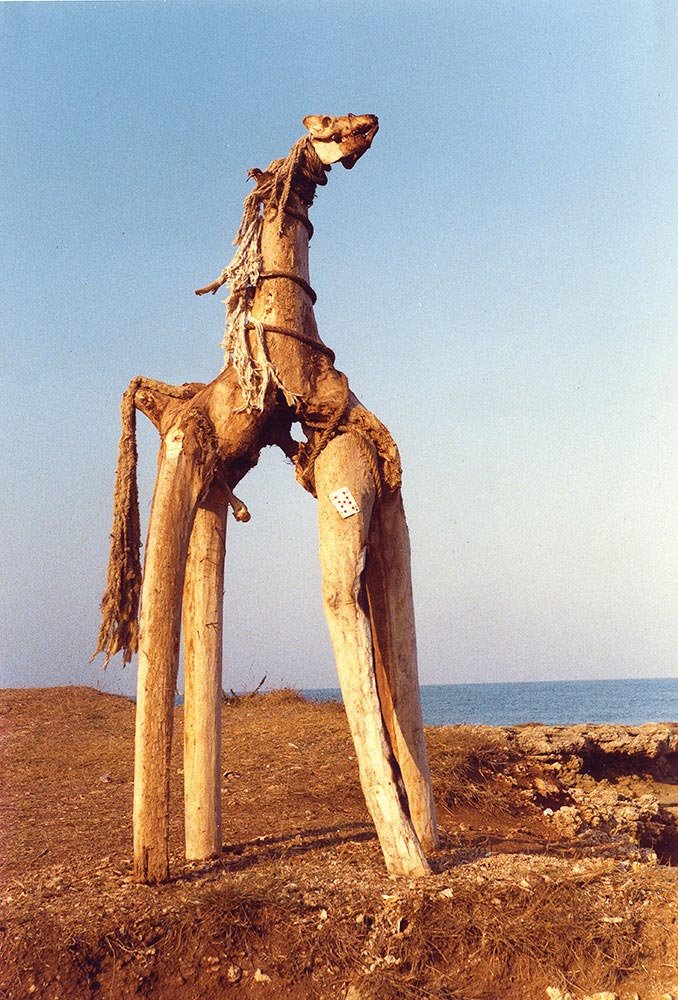
Sea Horse (1986)

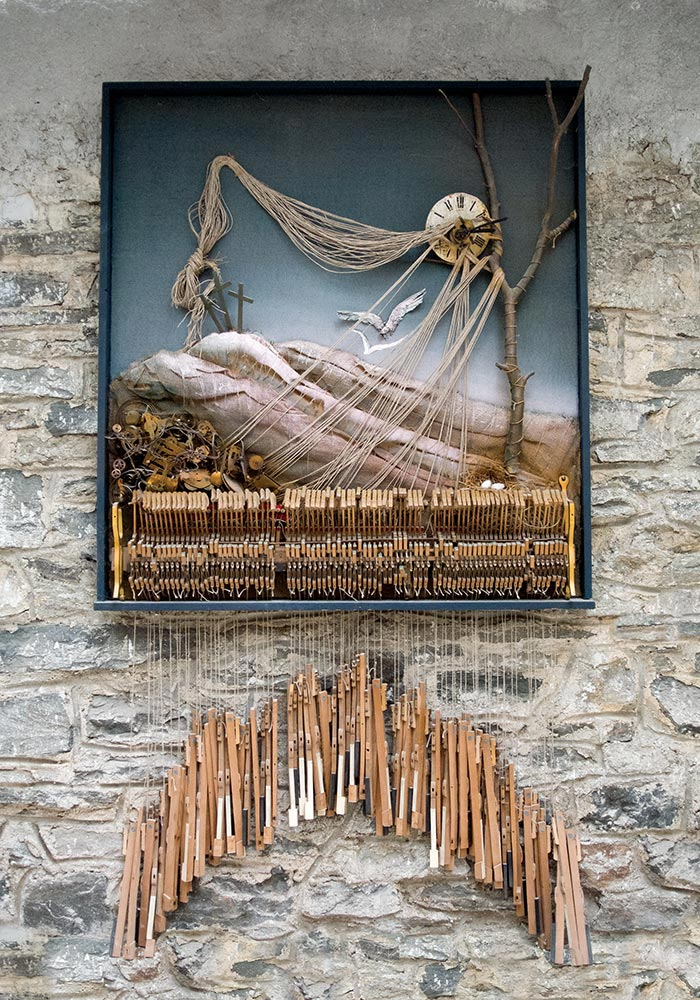
On the Landfill of Ages (1994)

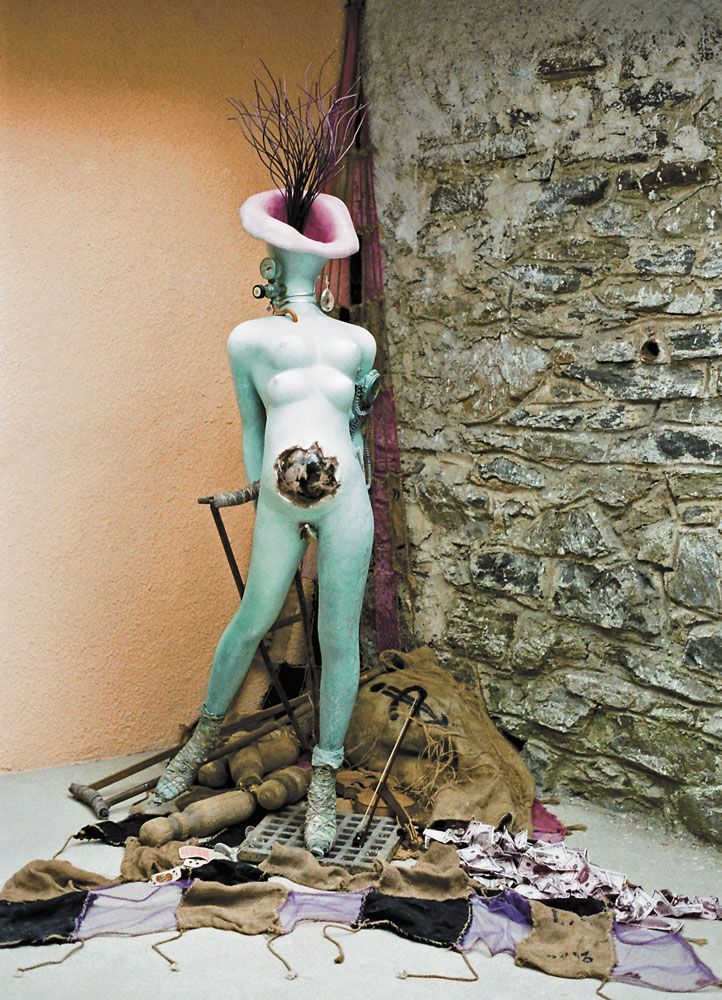
In the Prematurely Cloned Age of One Planet (2003)

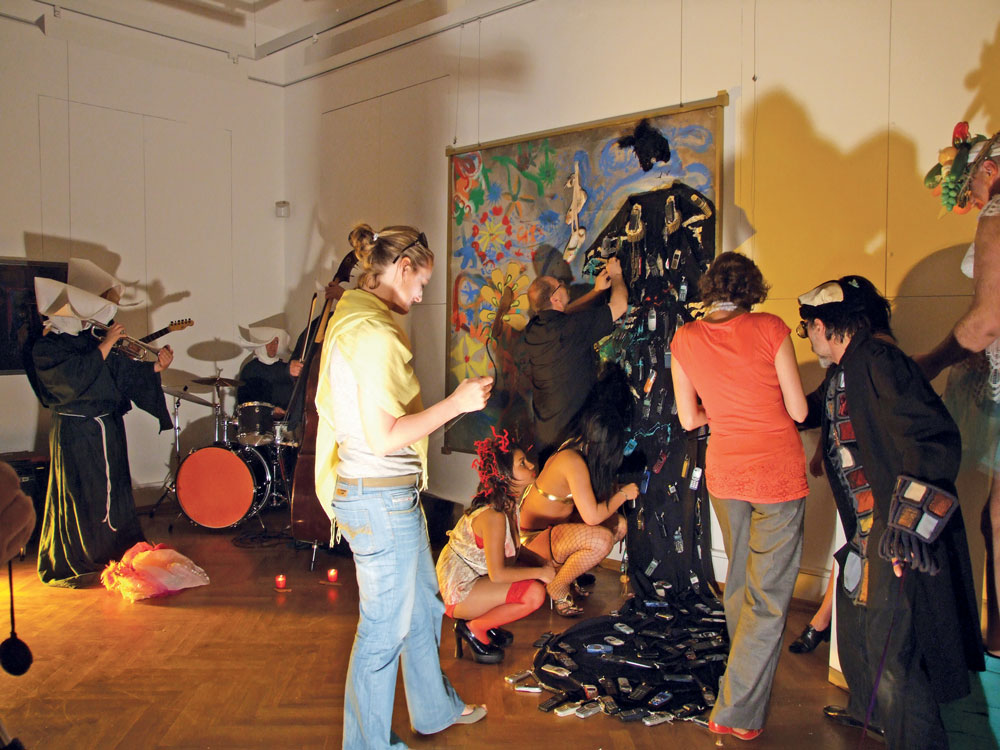
Requiem for Mobile Telephones (2007–2010)

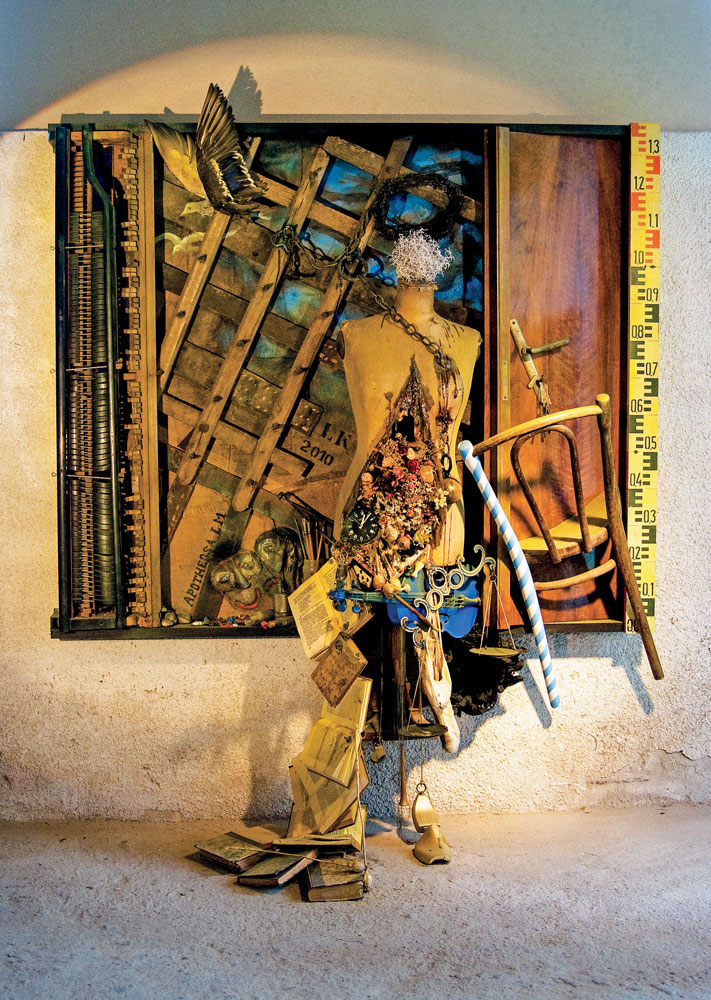
Apotheosis of Human Brain (2010)

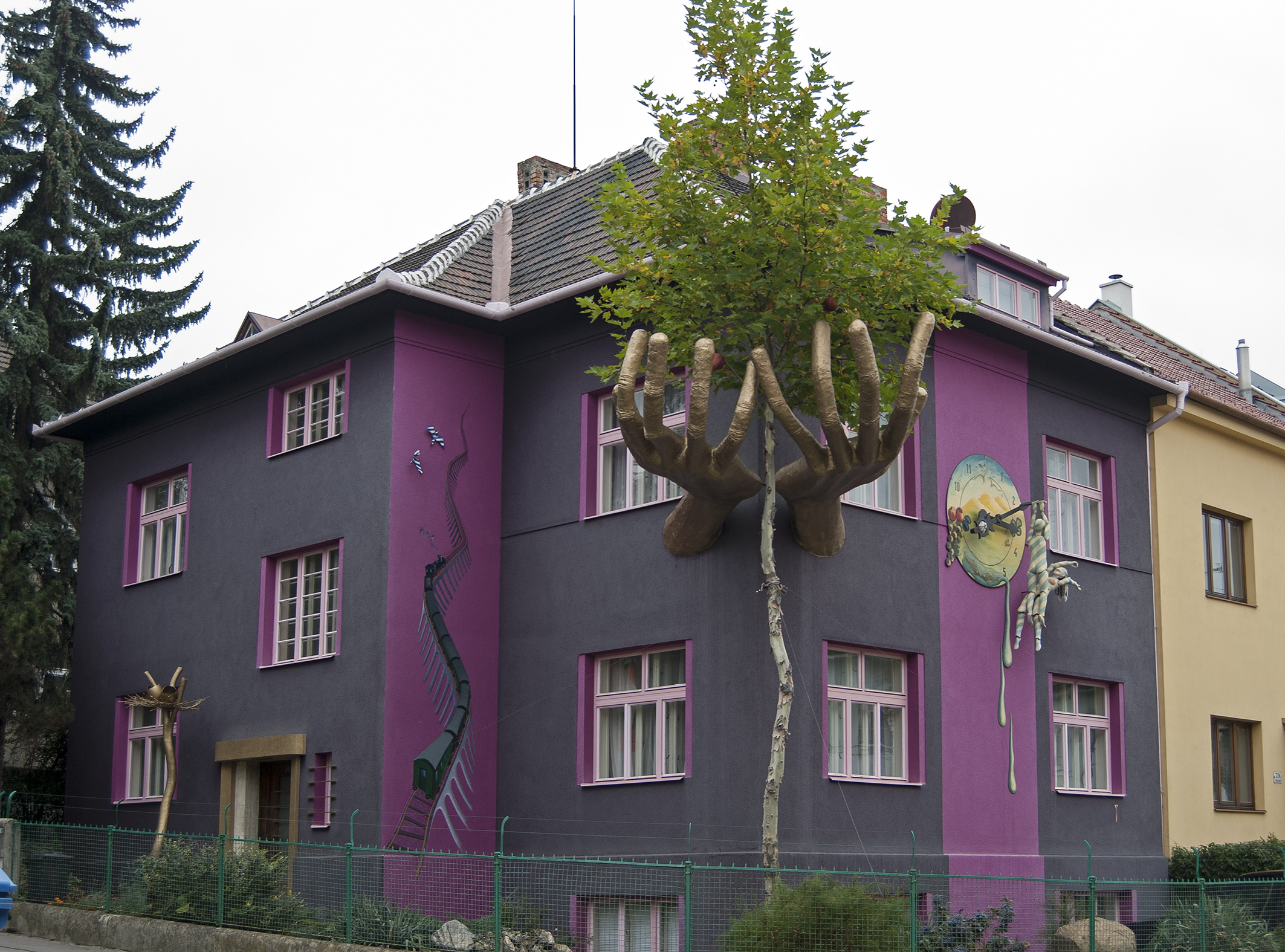
Kristek House (2015–2017)

== Painting ==
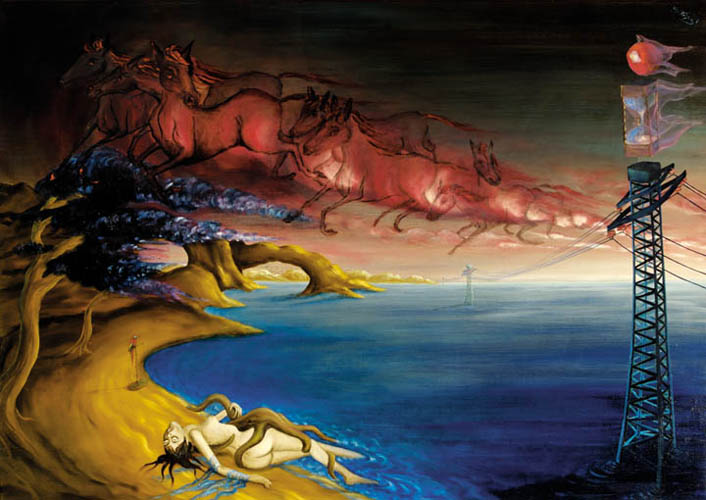
All-sided High Tension (1975–76).

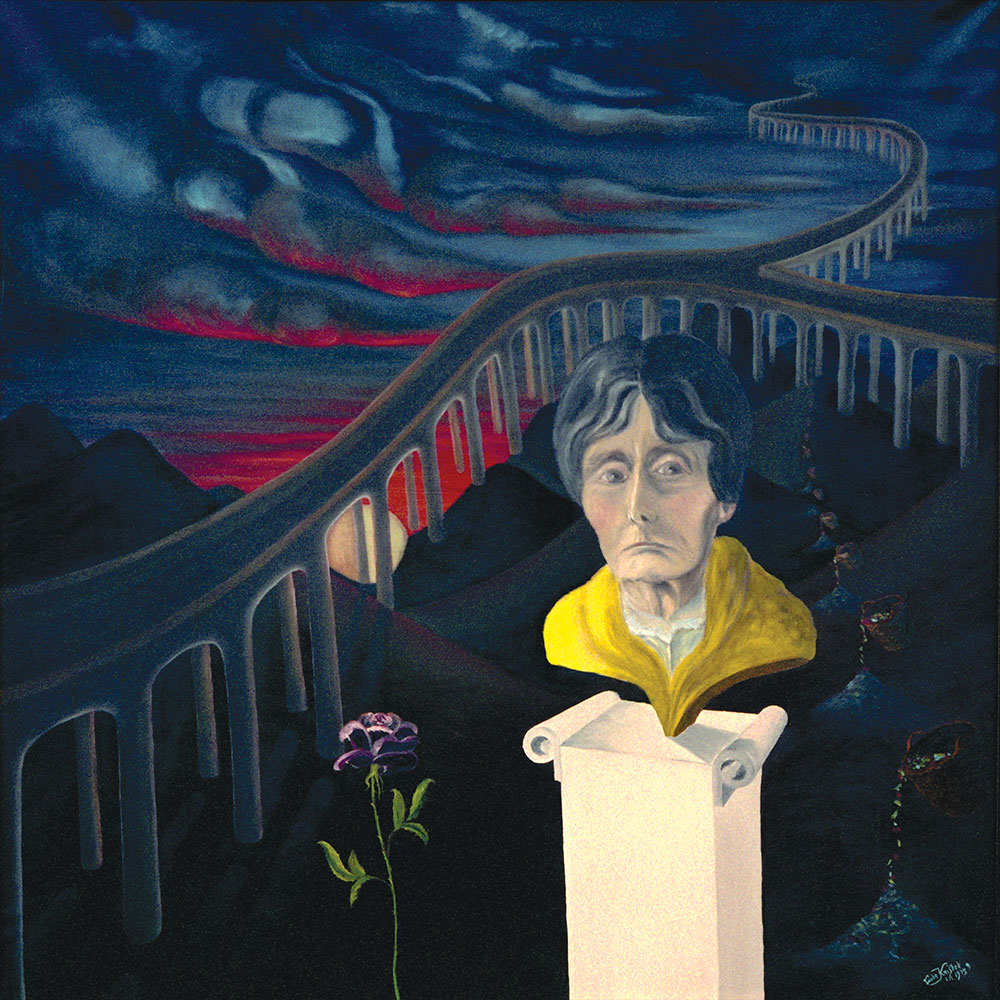
The Heavenly Highway of Aunt Fränzi (1974–75), Neues Stadtmuseum.

In 1977, Kristek created a monumental altar painting for the sacral space, the cemetery chapel in Penzing, Germany. He called the 7 m high painting Transcendental Composition between Suffering and Hope.

He has created his specific vocabulary in paintings. As far back as the 1970s, one can find a road, which is mostly bordered by the arches of bridges and which rises up, in his paintings. He calls it "the heavenly highway". The oil painting The Heavenly Highway of Aunt Fränzi (1974–75), which is today part of Neues Stadtmuseum's collection, is an example of early use of this symbol.

The ballerina or the dancer is the central theme of Kristek's paintings and happenings. The development of symbol in time reflects the changes in postmodern society. In the painting Billiards for Life and the Ballerina (1987), she personifies the vitality in the world of constant metamorphosis. However, in the happening The Way of the Cross (2014), the ballerina consumes all that is left after the destruction. In the painting Peculiar Pole Vault (2016), the ballerina appears as Death.

Another Kristek's lifelong motifs are tree with two apples and intergrowth or penetration of forms.

== Performance art ==
Kristek has organised happenings in Germany, the US, Canada, Italy, Spain, Czech Republic, Austria, Turkey, Belgium, Poland and Slovakia. His events can be described as happenings, performances or sometimes even site-specific, but he uses the original expression happening, because the involvement of the public as well as the authentic experience are crucial for him.

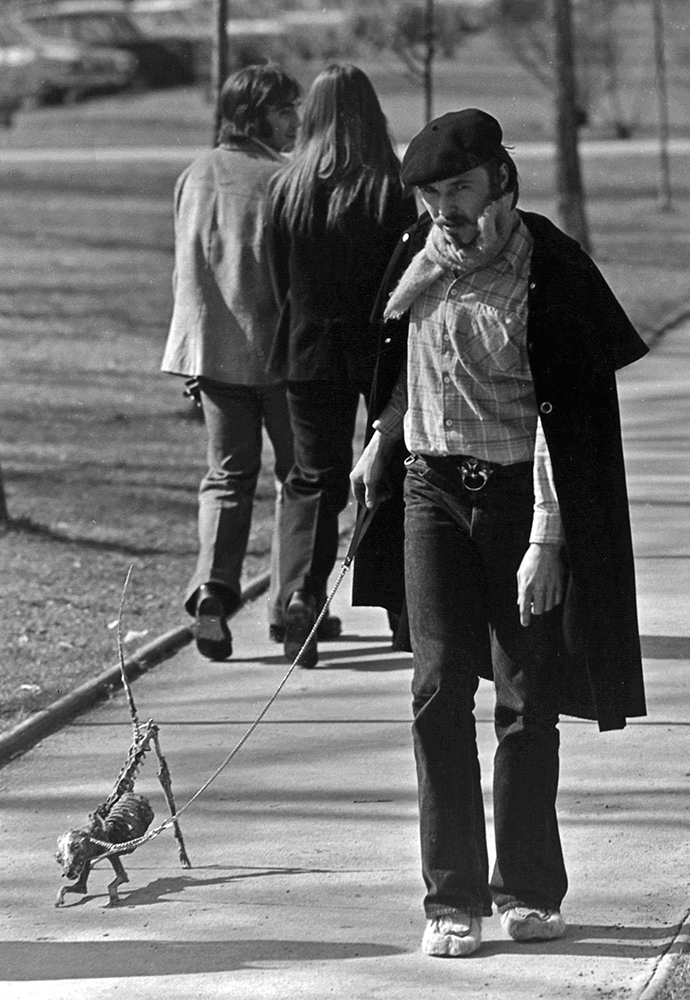
Lubo Kristek in the Promenade with a Neurotic Fox (1975).

In 1971, he started the Kristek's Night Vernissages in his studio with garden in Landsberg am Lech. They served as a meeting point for sculptors, painters, musicians, poets, philosophers and also the visitors. The magazine Collage noted that artists from Germany, Canada, England and the USA gathered there in 1976. These experiments were at the interface between theatre, music, improvisation and ritual. Kristek studies the crowd behavior, explores the border between performer and audience, and also the death taboo in his happenings. The motifs of death, the illness of society and doom are counterbalanced by birth or rebirth, liberation from shackles and intergrowth of forms.

The magazine Medizin + Kunst analyzed Kristek's happenings:

In his artistic process we can see the linkage to Freudian psychoanalysis, his happenings and performances are conducted in the spirit of the so-called 'Activité Paranoique Critique' of Salvador Dalí, and in them the artist has the possibility to develop his uncommon abilities in them and go into a trancelike state – with a wholly unexpected end. (…) Yet at the same time Lubo Kristek looks for the opening of new spaces, he attempts to vibrate the unknown places of the spectators' soul, and the intention of his performance is the force of creation and artistic intuition to even overcome death mentally.

=== Promenade with a Neurotic Fox ===
In 1975, Kristek went for a walk with a fox's skeleton on a leash on the colonnade in Landsberg am Lech and observed the reactions of the people. His aim was to study the crowd behavior and the death taboo.

=== Pyramidae-Klipteon II ===
Kristek's performances can often be interpreted as a critique of consumerism. At the climax of his happening in 2002 in Podhradí nad Dyjí, he crawled out of bowels of a cow carcass to read his manifest against the destructive and self-destructive tendencies of society.

=== Visio Sequentes or Concerning the Prematurely Cloned Age of a Planet ===
This piece took place at the Znojmo Castle, Czech Republic in 2003. The artist dissolved the boundary between the auditorium and the stage. In the climax of the happening, he dispersed the artists, mentally disabled people, amongst the spectators. The spectators were quite shocked and looked around uncomfortably to find out who is who. Kristek forced them to wonder where the boundary is and whether it exists at all. His aim was to evoke a threshold situation, when the shocked spectator is shifted outside his stereotypes and has the possibility to re-evaluate them.

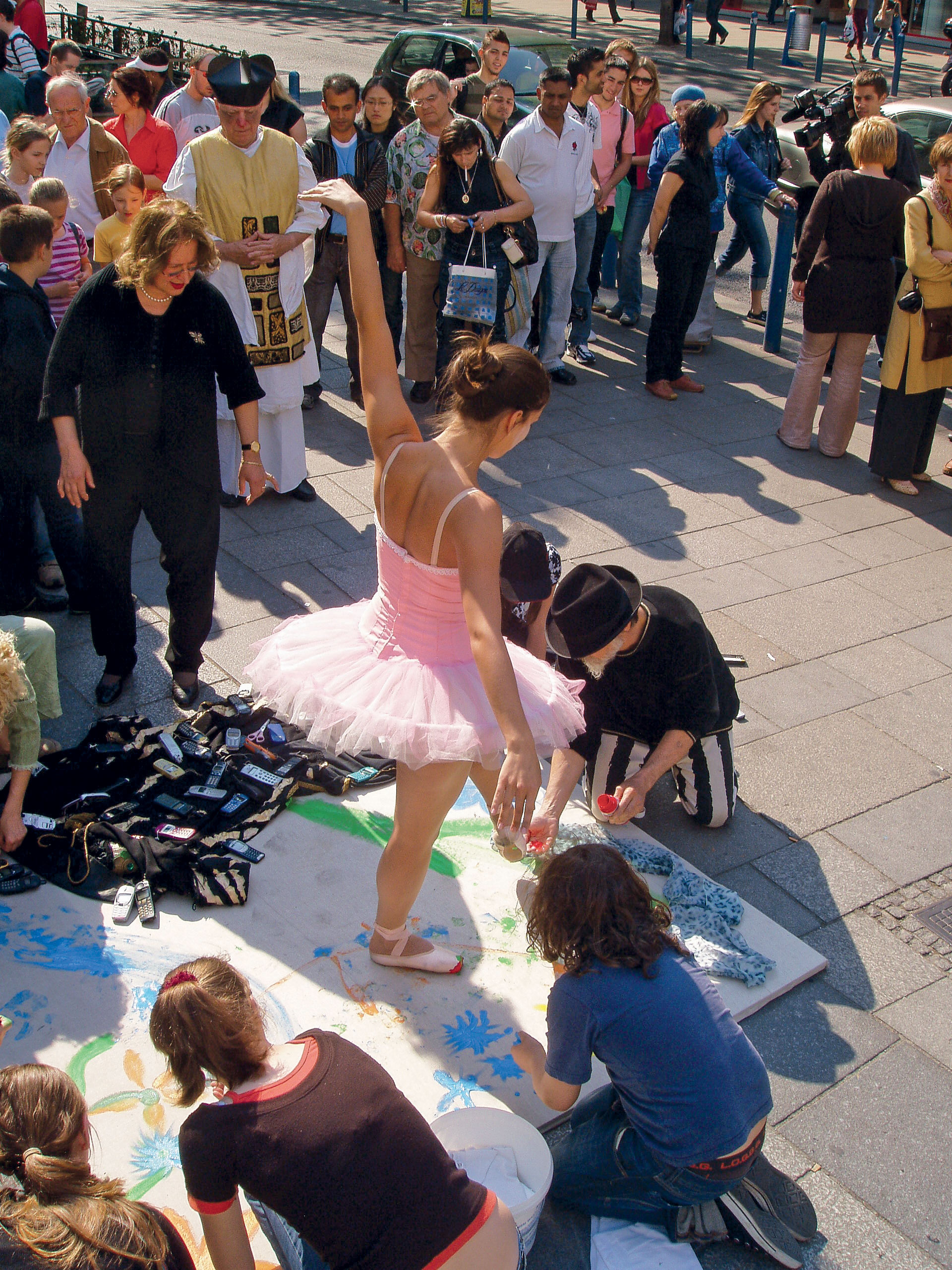
Requiem for Mobile Telephones (2007), Vienna, Mariahilfer Straße.

=== Requiem for Mobile Telephones ===
In 2007–2010, Lubo Kristek presented an interactive assemblage Requiem for Mobile Telephones that originated in a series of his happenings. The audience gave up their mobile phones and participated in incorporating the phones in the assemblage. Kristek travelled with this happening series to the Czech Republic (Znojmo), Austria (Vienna), Germany (Landsberg am Lech) and Poland (Sucha Beskidzka) and the assemblage kept changing. The project was aimed against addiction to modern technologies.

=== Holographic perception ===
Lubo Kristek formulated his theory of holographic perception. He does not organise scenes in a linear manner in his performance art pieces. On the contrary, there are several different actions happening at the same time during Kristek's event. According to his theory, a far more plastic and holographic picture is formed in the mind of the spectator. The layering of scenes and meanings results not in a disruption of the perception, but in its sharpening. It evokes activity and creativity in the spectators.

Kristek's work in various media is interconnected. His artwork in one media becomes a means of expression for an artwork in another media. For example, his sculpture Pyramidae-Klipteon became a prop for his happening Gate to a New Dimension (2012). Then, the artist used the scene from the happening in his oil painting Landscape of Senses with Supported Clouds (2013).

The art historian Hartfrid Neunzert noted on Kristek's legacy in his foreword for the monography published by the Neues Stadtmuseum in 2008:

It is not persumptious to claim that Lubo Kristek is one of the few artists who followed their creative callings now for almost a lifetime and set particularly sustainable momentums.

== Bibliography ==
- Schwabe, Nick (1977). Lubo Kristek: Individual Visions of Sculptures from the Last 8 Years, 1968–1976. Vancouver. OCLC 1120009882.
- Jurgeleit, Peter; Hellerer, Frederike; Hellerer, Heinz (1986). Schwäbische Künstlerprofile / 1. Allgäu, Bayerisches Schwaben (in German). Herrsching: Vorlag Fredrike Hellerer. ISBN 3925976000.
- Slovník českých a slovenských výtvarných umělců 1950 - 2001 (VI. Kon - Ky) (in Czech). Ostrava: Výtvarné centrum Chagall. 2001. ISBN 80-86171-06-X.
- Schlösschen Lubo: Auswahl aus der Sammlung des Schlösschens Lubo quer durch die Geschichte (in German). Brno: VÚKU. 2010. ISBN 9788025479773.
- Lubo Kristek: American Cycle 77, Philosophical Approach to the Questions of Form (selected works). Brno: VÚKU. 2011. ISBN 9788025498453. OCLC 791305280.
- Půtová, Barbora (2013). Kristek's Glyptothek im Thayatal (in German). Brno: VÚKU. ISBN 9788090554818. OCLC 892780553.
- Lubo Kristek: Happening-Schaffen im Thayatal (in German). Brno: VÚKU. 2013. ISBN 9788090554801.
- Tzschaschel, Hans-Jürgen (2015). Schätze aus den städtischen Sammlungen des neuen Stadtmuseums Landsberg am Lech (in German). Landsberg am Lech: Freundeskreis der städtischen Museen Landsberg e.V. OCLC 946758642.
