= Aaron Padilla =

Aaron Padilla may refer to:

- Aarón Padilla (footballer, born 1942), Mexican football forward
- Aaron Padilla (artist), American artist and art director
- Aarón Padilla (footballer, born 1977), Mexican football manager and former striker, son of footballer born 1942
