= Ohira =

Ōhira (大平) (also Ohira, Oohira) is a Japanese surname and place name.

== Astronomy ==
- 8533 Oohira, a main-belt asteroid
- Oohira Station, alternative name for the Nihondaira Observatory

== Places ==
- Ōhira, Miyagi, a village located in Kurokawa District, Miyagi, Japan
- Ōhira, Tochigi, a former town located in Shimotsuga District, Tochigi, Japan

== People ==
- Ichiji Ohira, member of the Japanese rock band, Anzen Chitai
- Masayoshi Ōhira (1910–1980), 68th and 69th Prime Minister of Japan
- Minoru Ohira (born 1950), Japanese-born artist
- Motoori Ōhira (1756–1833), scholar of Kokugaku
- Shinya Ohira (born 1966), Japanese animator
- Shuzo Ohira (1930–1998), professional Go player
- Takayuki Ohira (born 1970), Japanese engineer and the creator of the Megastar, a world record-holding planetarium projector
- Takehiro Ōhira, professional shogi player
- Tōru Ōhira (1929–2016), Japanese voice actor
