= Fred H. Roster =

Untitled, stoneware, brass and wood sculpture by Roster, c. 1970, Honolulu Museum of Art

Fred H. Roster (June 27, 1944 – December 19, 2017) was an American sculptor known for his mixed media narrative sculptures.

== Biography ==
Roster was born in Palo Alto, California, and grew up on a farm. He received an MA degree in ceramics from San José State University in 1968. He came to Hawaii in 1969 on his honeymoon and decided to stay. In 1970, he earned an MFA degree in sculpture from the University of Hawaii at Manoa, and joined the university's faculty in 1971. He retired as professor and chair of the sculpture program in 2016.

Roster sculpted in rough-hewn wood, clay, and stone, often combining these materials in a single work. With the help of his students, he cast many of his own wood and clay sculptures in bronze. Moveable wheels were incorporated into many sculptures. Others included dogs, especially miniature schnauzers, which his mother raised. Untitled in the collection of the Honolulu Museum of Art is typical of his mixed-media sculptures. The Hawaii State Art Museum also holds work by Roster.

Roster died in December 2017, aged 73; he was survived by his wife, and a son from a prior marriage.

== Sources ==
- Clarke, Joan and Diane Dods, Artists/Hawaii, Honolulu, University of Hawaii Press, 1996, 68-73
- Hartwell, Patricia L. (editor), Retrospective 1967-1987, Hawaii State Foundation on Culture and the Arts, Honolulu, Hawaii, 1987, p. 141
- International Art Society of Hawai'i, Kuilima Kākou, Hawai’i-Japan Joint Exhibition, Honolulu, International Art Society of Hawai'i, 2004, p. 41
- Maui Arts & Cultural Center, Schaefer Portrait Challenge, 2003, Maui Arts & Cultural Center, 2003, p. 50
- Morse, Marcia, It Seemed Like the Future, Works by Fred Roster 1969-2010, Honolulu, Honolulu Academy of Arts, 2010
- Morse, Marcia and Allison Wong, 10 Years: The Contemporary Museum at First Hawaiian Center, The Contemporary Museum, Honolulu, 2006, ISBN 1888254076, p. 98
- Nelson, Shane, In Good Form, Renowned Sculptor Fred Roster and Rising Star Aaron Padilla Share a Common Thread, HiLuxury, June/July 2013, Vol 7, Issue 1, pp 40–42
- Yoshihara, Lisa A., Fred Roster, Portfolio in Bamboo Ridge: Journal of Hawai'i Literature and Arts, Vol. 94, Fall 2008, 135-145
