= Janice Lowry =

American artist

- Born: March 30, 1946; Phoenix, Arizona
- Died: September 20, 2009 (aged 63); Santa Ana, California
- Education: Art Center College of Design, BFA with honors, 1979; MFA in painting, 1980
- Known for: Assemblage, Collage, Painting
- Spouse(s): Jan Gilbert, m. 1965; Jon Gothold, m. 1983
- Website: janicelowry.com

Janice Lowry (March 30, 1946 – September 20, 2009) was an American visual artist who worked in Arizona and California and was known primarily for her assemblages, collages, paintings, and the elaborately visual journals that she kept throughout her life.

== Biography ==
Lowry's highly biographical artwork is rooted in her early family life. She was one of five children whose mother married 7 times. Family instability and difficulty figure prominently in her work. At the age of 11, she started keeping a diary and continued to do so until 2007, with the exception of one decade.

In 1965, Lowry married Jan Gilbert, whom she had known in high school. They soon had two children, Brandon and Kevin. Lowry painted at home and also worked for interior decorators. It was during this time that Lowry set up her first studio and started to show her work. Her assemblage work often was created with found objects and instead of framing the finished piece, which she couldn't afford, she installed the pieces in wooden frame boxes. Over the years, her assemblage work transitioned from impressionistic to introspective, mirroring her admiration for Frida Kahlo in the 1970s to 1980s.

In 1973, Lowry moved to California when her husband's company transferred him to Whittier. In 1975, Lowry and Gilbert divorced.

After graduation with her Master's from the Art Center College of Design in 1980, she began to teach at the center.

In 1983, Lowry married advertising art director Jon Gothold and took a break from teaching. Her journal styles began to evolve to include comic-style panels and lists of thoughts. By the mid-1990s, the journals developed into fully formed art objects, with heavily collaged and painted covers enclosing a mix of painting, essays, stamp art, and clippings.

In 2007, on advice from Pat House, executive director of the Muckenthaler Cultural Center in Fullerton, Lowry began looking for a way to share and preserve her 126-volume collection of journals. In 2007, the journals were made part of the permanent collection of the Smithsonian Institution's Archives of American Art.

Lowry died on September 20, 2009, at her Santa Ana home, at the age of 63, from liver cancer.

== Education and career ==
=== Education ===
- 1979 Bachelor's degree Art Center College of Design in Pasadena, CA.
- 1980 Master's degree Art Center College of Design in Pasadena, CA.

=== Teaching ===
- Cypress College
- Art Institute of Orange County

=== Selected exhibitions ===
Janice Lowry: Water Collection & Journals (2008)
Grand Central Gallery, Santa Ana, CA

The OsCene (2006-7)
Laguna Beach Museum of Art, Laguna Beach, CA

Funktional Art (2006)
Amorviejo Art Gallery, Santa Ana, CA

A Few Of Our Favorite Things (2006-7)
Santa Ana College Arts Gallery at the Santora Building

The Art of Remembering: Words and Images (2007)
The Muckenthaler Cultural Center, Fullerton, CA

Janice Lowry: A One Person Show (2007)
Coastline Community College, Huntington Beach, CA

=== Art Journals, circa 1973-2007 ===
Lowry switched from keeping smaller personal diaries to larger format (7 1/2 by 9 1/2 inch) journals around 1974. The journals contain both text and artworks. The artworks are in the form of sketches, paintings, and collages, rendered in ink, pencil, watercolors, acrylic paint, crayon, marker pens, and ink stamps. Inside the journals, she recorded phone numbers, studies, plans, and diagrams, tucking in loose papers, letters, photographs, and objects.

She included topics in her journals such as travel, thoughts, lists, dreams, finances, critiques, correspondence, timelines, and relationship with her mother. The journals also include sketches of vacation spots, objects around the house, studies, people. She also let her children sketch in her journals.

Lowry was named the Orange Count region's best visual artist of 2007 by the OC Weekly for her assemblage creations.
