= Monument to the Five Senses =

Sculpture by Lubo Kristek

- Denkmal für die fünf Sinne (German)
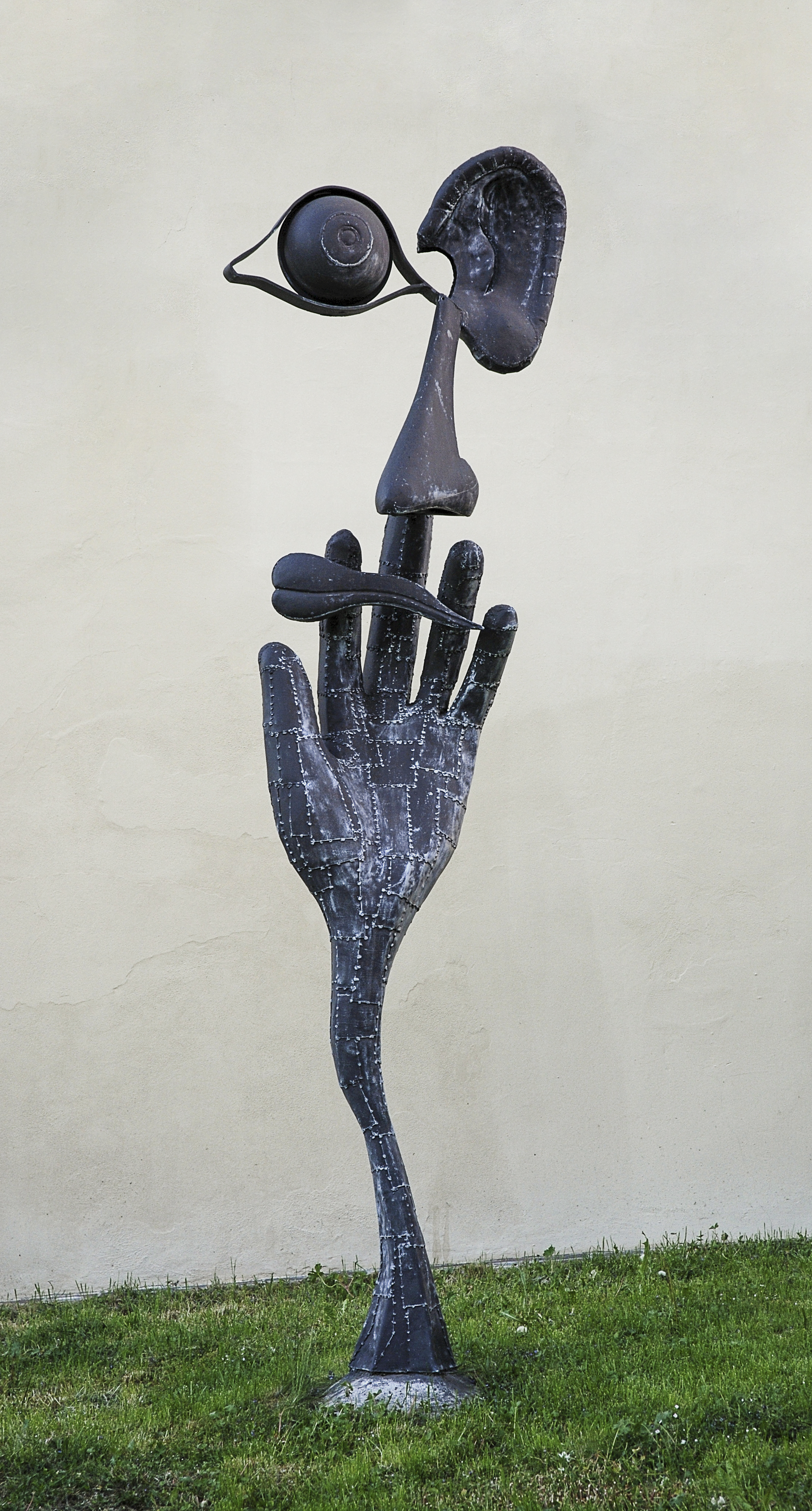
- Artist: Lubo Kristek
- Year: 1991
- Medium: metal
- Movement: surrealism
- Subject: sculpture
- Dimensions: 450 cm (180 in)
- Location: Neues Stadtmuseum, Landsberg am Lech, Germany
- 48°2′57.0″N 10°52′46.5″E
- Owner: Neues Stadtmuseum, Landsberg am Lech

Monument to the Five Senses (German: Denkmal für die fünf Sinne) is a 1991 metal sculpture by Lubo Kristek, installed outside the Neues Stadtmuseum, Landsberg am Lech, Germany in 1992. This tribute to human senses is made using repoussé and chasing technique, and is composed of welded sheets of metal.

== History and description ==
The piece depicts five human senses that conjoin in a face-like shape and resemble a growing plant. Kristek executed the sculpture in one of his typical techniques – from welded sheets of metal. The Czech art historian Barbora Putova noted:

Just like a medieval artist, Kristek personally welds, grinds and carves his sculptures. From many aspects his free-standing sculptures represent a surreal parallel with the paintings of the Czech painter Mikuláš Medek (1926–1974), the German painter Max Ernst (1891–1976) and the Spanish painter Salvador Dalí. This is documented in particular by Kristek’s metal sculptures Monument to the Five Senses (1991) and Tree of the Wind Harp (1992).

Kristek addressed senses and perception in his sculptural works. In some of his performance art pieces, he studied perception and behaviour of crowd. His ideas evolved in his theory of holographic perception – that various types of stimuli entangle and excite a holographic image in the mind of the spectator. In 2008, Thomas Goppel wrote a foreword for the publication about Lubo Kristek issued by the Neues Stadtmuseum and noted that this sculpture is a reminder that "art should be perceived by all the senses."

The piece was commissioned by Beatrix und Erich Matthees (the Lechstadt Hausbau company) and donated to the museum. In November 1992, it was inaugurated in the museum’s garden as an introduction to Kristek’s solo retrospective exhibition in the Neues Stadtmuseum starting on 12 December.

In 2015, the sculpture was included in the selection of 40 collection pieces owned by the Neues Stadtmuseum described in the publication Schätze aus den städtischen Sammlungen des Neuen Stadtmuseums Landsberg am Lech (Treasures of the Municipal Collection in the Neues Stadtmuseum Landsberg am Lech).
