= Tree of Knowledge (sculpture) =

Monumental sculpture by Lubo Kristek

- Baum des Wissens (German)
- Artist: Lubo Kristek
- Year: 1981
- Medium: Monumental sculpture
- Dimensions: 1600 cm (630 in)
- Location: Ignaz-Kögler-Gymnasium, Landsberg am Lech, Germany

External image
- Tree of Knowledge

Tree of Knowledge (German: Baum des Wissens) is a 1981 public artwork by Lubo Kristek located in the Ignaz-Kögler-Gymnasium (high school) in Landsberg am Lech, Germany. The 16 m tall sculpture in architecture is made of wood and stainless steel.

The sculpture was commissioned for the newly built extension at the school. Kristek co-operated with the architect Kergel.

The staircase wraps around the sculpture of a tree with symbolic fruit. The core of the sculpture is made of wood and covered with strips of steel. Rocks on the ground represent the soil as a growth medium. The seven metal spheres hang on the tree branches representing fruits that bear wooden reliefs symbolizing arts, sciences and eros. Next to the tree, in the basement, there stands a larger-than-life-sized figure of a man who looks up to the fruits. The sculpture ends up in the skylight with sun and planets.

The piece refers to the missionary and astronomer Ignaz Kögler whose name bears the school in which the sculpture is located. Kristek noted that Kögler enriched foreign cultural environment and that is the reason why the sculpture is "rooted in the native soil" and "rises to all the heights of human spirit."

According to the art historian Hartfrid Neunzert, the mission of this artwork is to incite the students to assume consciously their place in education and to learn to think independently.

Walter Etschmann wrote that the artwork gave a new meaning to the staircase that can now be understood as a symbol of the journey towards knowledge with the light at the end (represented by the light cone).

The Steinmetz + Bildhauer magazine noted:

One could hardly imagine a more inseparable and fruitful unity of art and architecture. Where could we find, in the field of art in architecture, a comparable example in Rhineland over the last twelve years?
