= Gordon Wagner =

American artist (1915–1987)

Gordon Wagner (1915–1987) was an American artist. He was born and raised in Redondo Beach, California.

Wagner became an orphan at a young age. He completed a degree from the UCLA. He worked in the Aerospace industry as a mechanical engineer.
