= Ondrej Mares =

Australian sculptor (1949–2008)

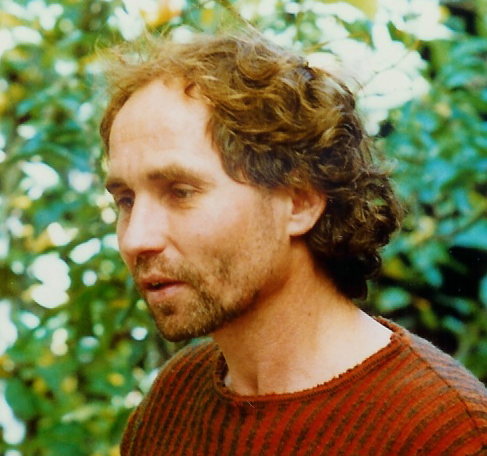
Ondrej Mares 1991

Ondrej Mares (11 February 1949 – 19 March 2008) was an Australian artist and furniture designer who lived in Macclesfield, South Australia. His work has been exhibited in Adelaide, Sydney and Prague. Mares is most famous for his Kachina pieces. In 2002, he was diagnosed with cancer, which had the effect of shifting his focus from larger pieces to smaller more compact pieces. Also, clues to his sickness manifested in later works, such as his Kachina titled 'Stem Cells'. Mares' work has been described as "jamming as much experience, humour and detail into each of his arte povera pieces, usually about 50 cm (20 in) high, as is aesthetically possible."

== Early life ==
Mares started his working life as a toolmaker in Prague, and was exceptionally skilled in this area, reaching the rank of Toolmaker First Class prior to the Prague Spring of 1968. Mares recalled going to work one morning during this time to find several tanks parked outside the factory at which he worked. It was during this time that Mares' tools were stolen, leaving him with a debt to the state that had to be paid off. Mares and another toolmaker worked nights until the debt was paid, and he then decided to leave Czechoslovakia and emigrate.

=== In Australia ===
Once in Australia, Mares worked in several different locations, including Darwin and Broome. Mares worked in his own workshop at Macclesfield, South Australia producing furniture and sculpture from 1975 onwards. In 1979, Mares completed a Diploma in Art and Craft in South Australia. He was a skilled carpenter, and in addition to building his house in Macclesfield he also built a house in Goolwa. During this time through personal travels and experiences, Mares developed his own unique style of work, which was manifested in several furniture designs and some sculptures. His rate of work was prolific, and his daughter recalled that he was always working in his workshop from early morning to dusk.

== Study travels ==
Mares travelled extensively early in his career, and the inspiration from his travels is evident in his styles of work. Between 1973 and 1974, Mares did a formative study trip through Europe and Asia, including Indonesia (Flores), India, Sri Lanka, and Afghanistan. In 1990, Mares traveled to Europe to undertake a study of furniture design in Prague and Paris. Mares travelled back to Prague in 2004 and in 2007.

== Solo exhibitions ==
During his life, Mares exhibited a total of 17 times between 1984 and 2006. In addition to this, Mares' work was exhibited after he lost his battle to lymphoma in March 2008.

Year	Gallery and Location
2009	Stephen Sinclair Gallery, Adelaide "Ondrej Mares - A Lifetime" [Posthumous]
2006	BMG Art, Adelaide
2005	One Off Gallery, Macclesfield, Sala Festival
2003	Soho Gallery, Sydney
2003	BMG Art, Adelaide
2000	Galerie Gambit, Prague "Kaciny"
1999	Greenaway Art Gallery, Adelaide "Postcards from B.H."
1999	Framed Gallery, Darwin "Stitched"
1998	One Off Gallery, Macclesfield "New Work"
1997	Greenaway Art Gallery, Adelaide "Mere Sketches"
1996	One Off Gallery, Macclesfield "Gulas" (Festival Exhibition)
1995	D'Lux Gallery Adelaide, "Czech Connection"
1994	One Off Gallery, Macclesfield "Old New" (Festival Exhibition)
1991	Foyer Exhibition, Crafts Council of SA Aptos Cruz Galleries, Stirling, South Australia
1988	L'Unique Gallery, Adelaide, South Australia
1986	Elmswood Gallery, Adelaide, South Australia
1984	Greensleave Gallery, South Australia

== Group exhibitions ==
In addition to his solo exhibitions, Mares' work was exhibited as part of over 25 group exhibitions both in South Australia and Melbourne.

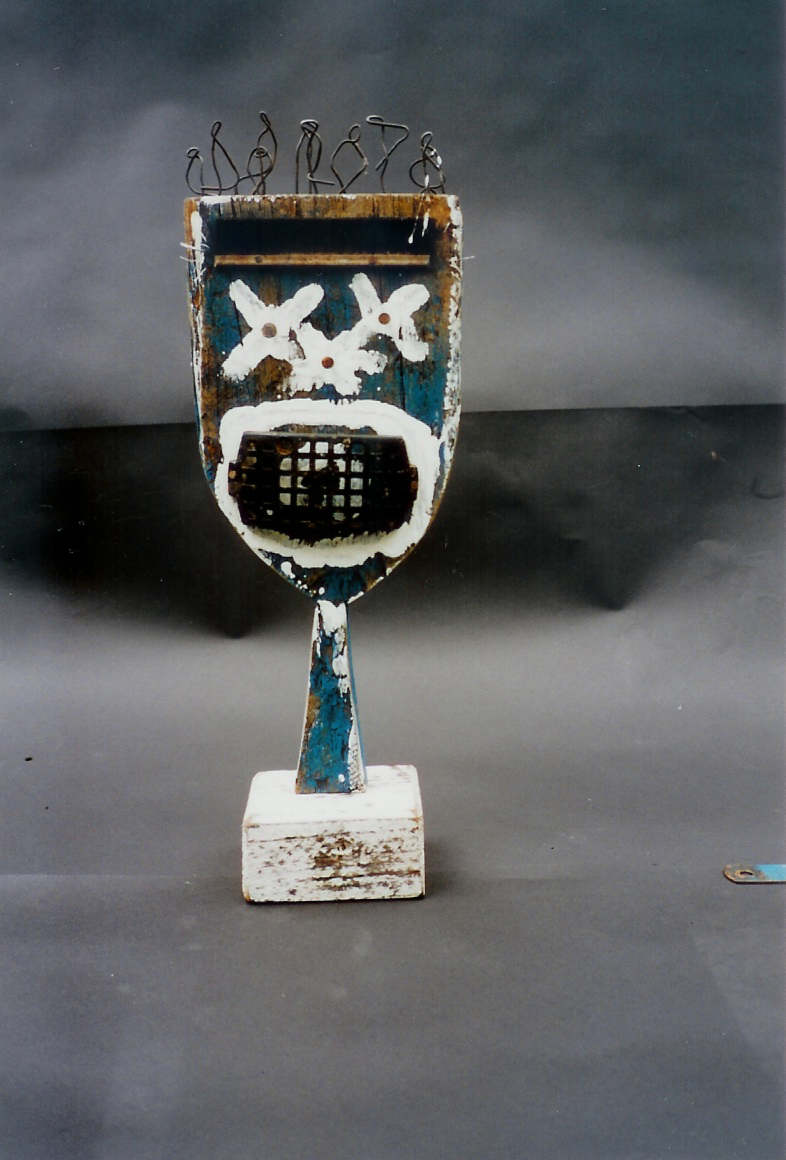
Untitled, by Ondrej Mares photographed at his gallery in Macclesfield, South Australia circa 2000.

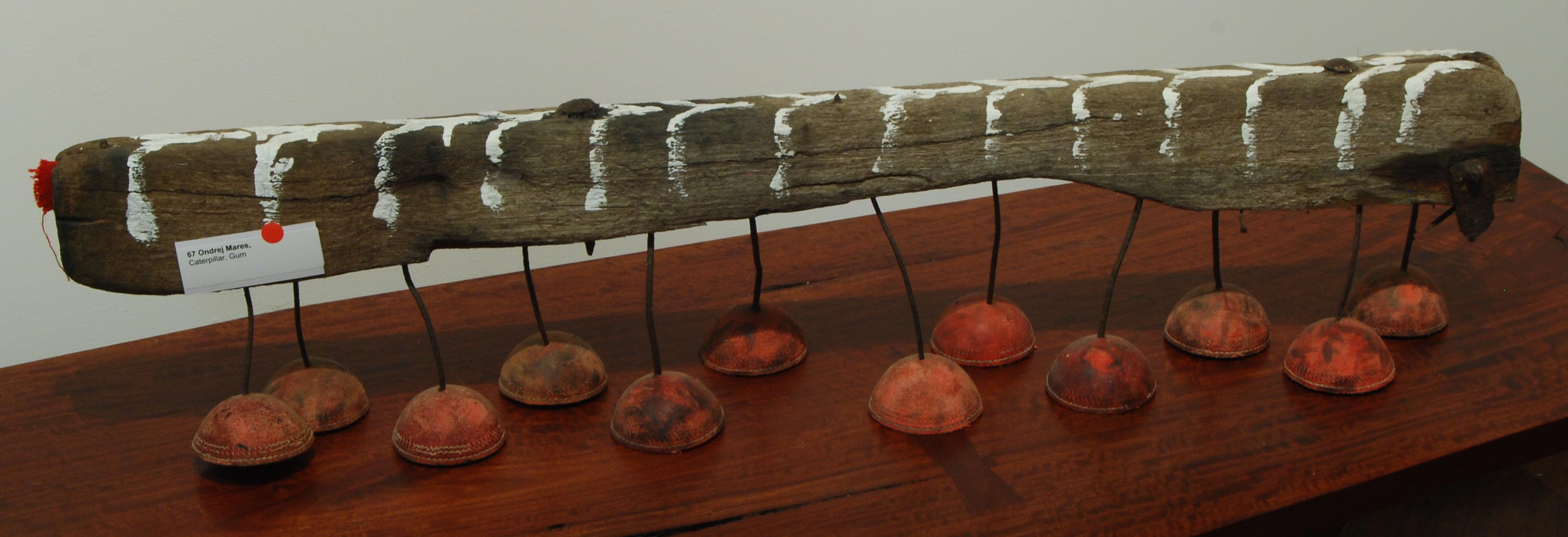
Caterpillar, by Ondrej Mares on exhibition at Stephen Sinclair gallery 100 Halifax Street, Adelaide on 11 February 2009.

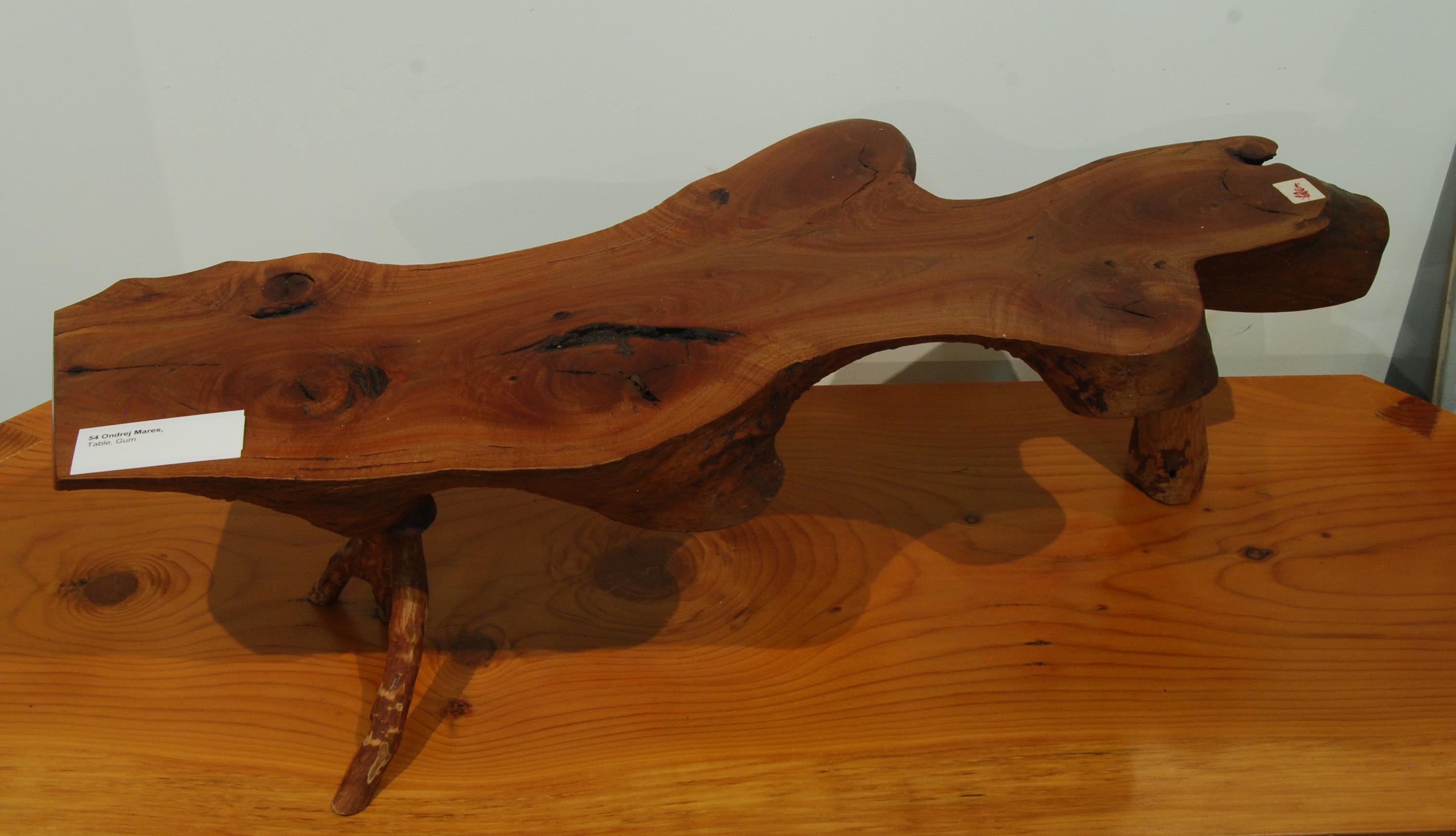
Gum Table by Ondrej Mares on exhibition at Stephen Sinclair gallery 100 Halifax Street, Adelaide on 11 February 2009.

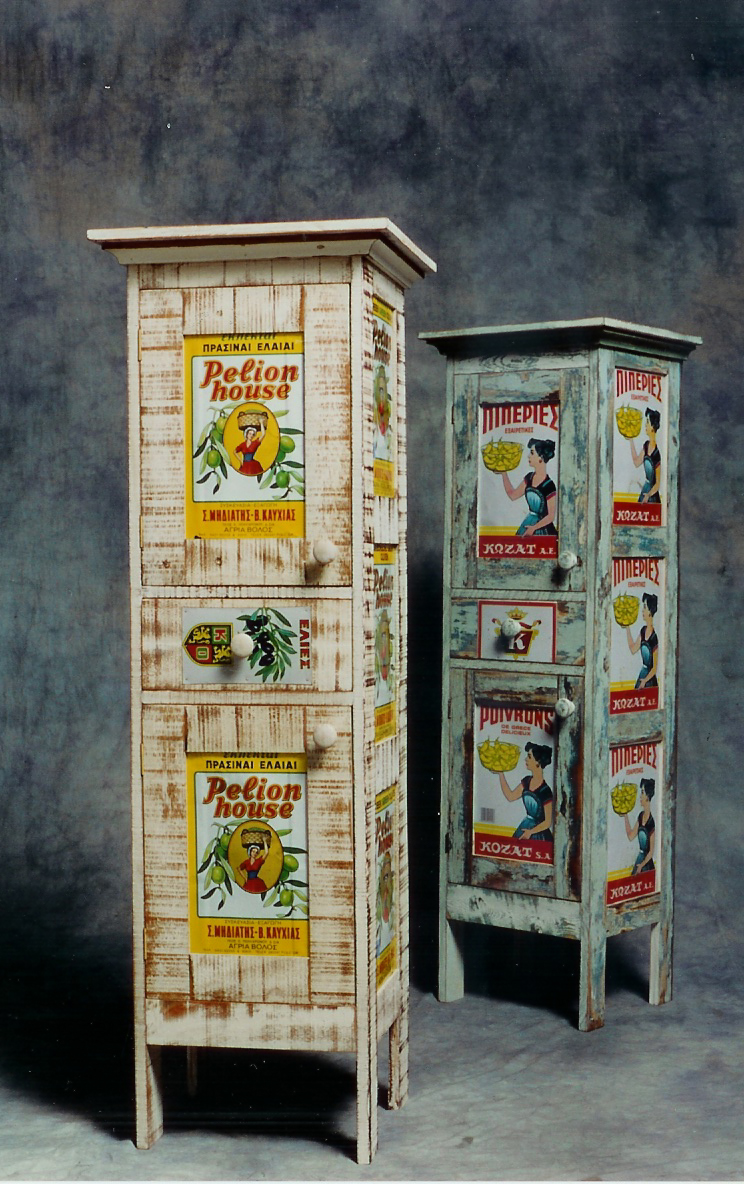
Two Wooden Cupboards by Ondrej Mares featuring metal paneling made from olive tins, cupboards constructed around 1996–1999.

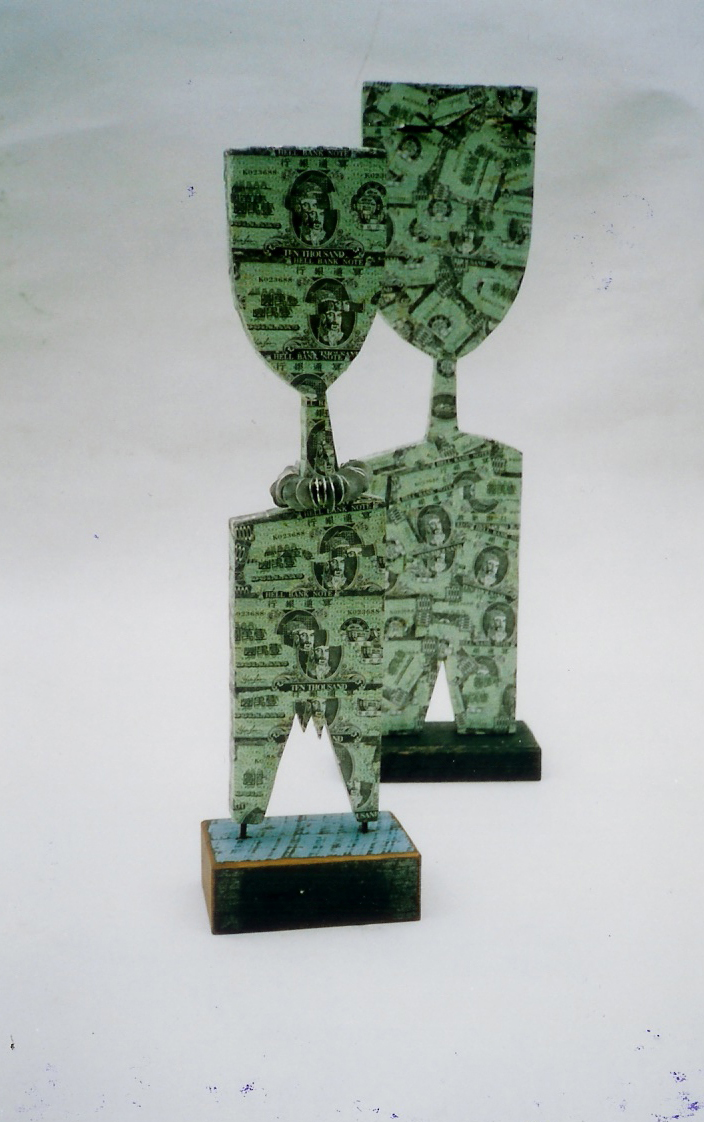
Two Kachinas by Ondrej Mares Titled Money Launders, 1999.

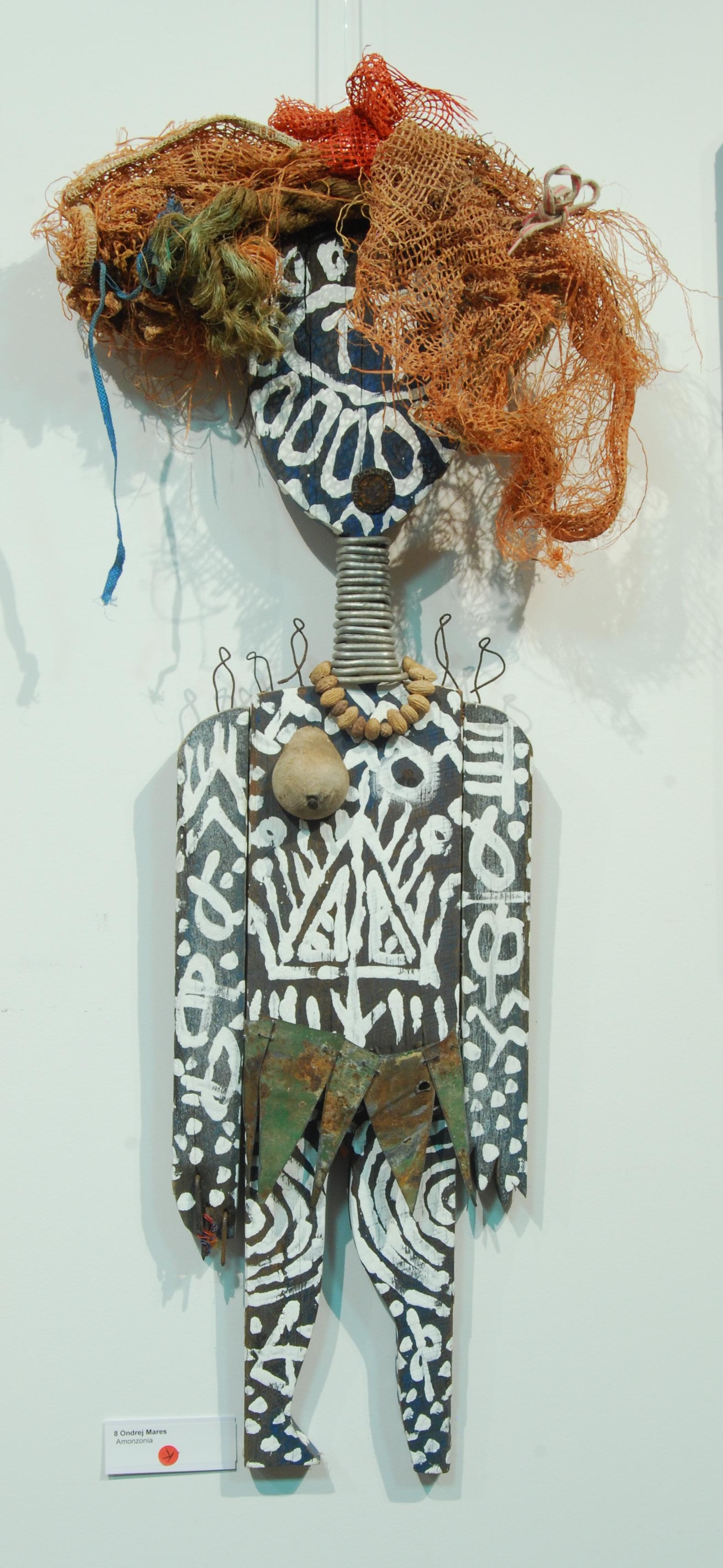
Kachina titled Amazonia by Ondrej Mares on exhibition at Stephen Sinclair Gallery, February 2009.

== Final years ==
Despite being diagnosed with cancer in 2002, Mares continued to produce a large amount of sculptures, tables and Kachinas. A large amount of his work remains unseen by the public.

Ondrej Mares died in hospital on 19 March 2008. He was cremated shortly after his death.

== Featuring publications ==
- Masters of Their Craft, Dr Noris Ioannou, 1997
- Monument Magazine Number 16, 1997
- Modern Australian Furniture, M. Bofle and P. Landman 1994
