= Podhradí nad Dyjí =

- Municipality
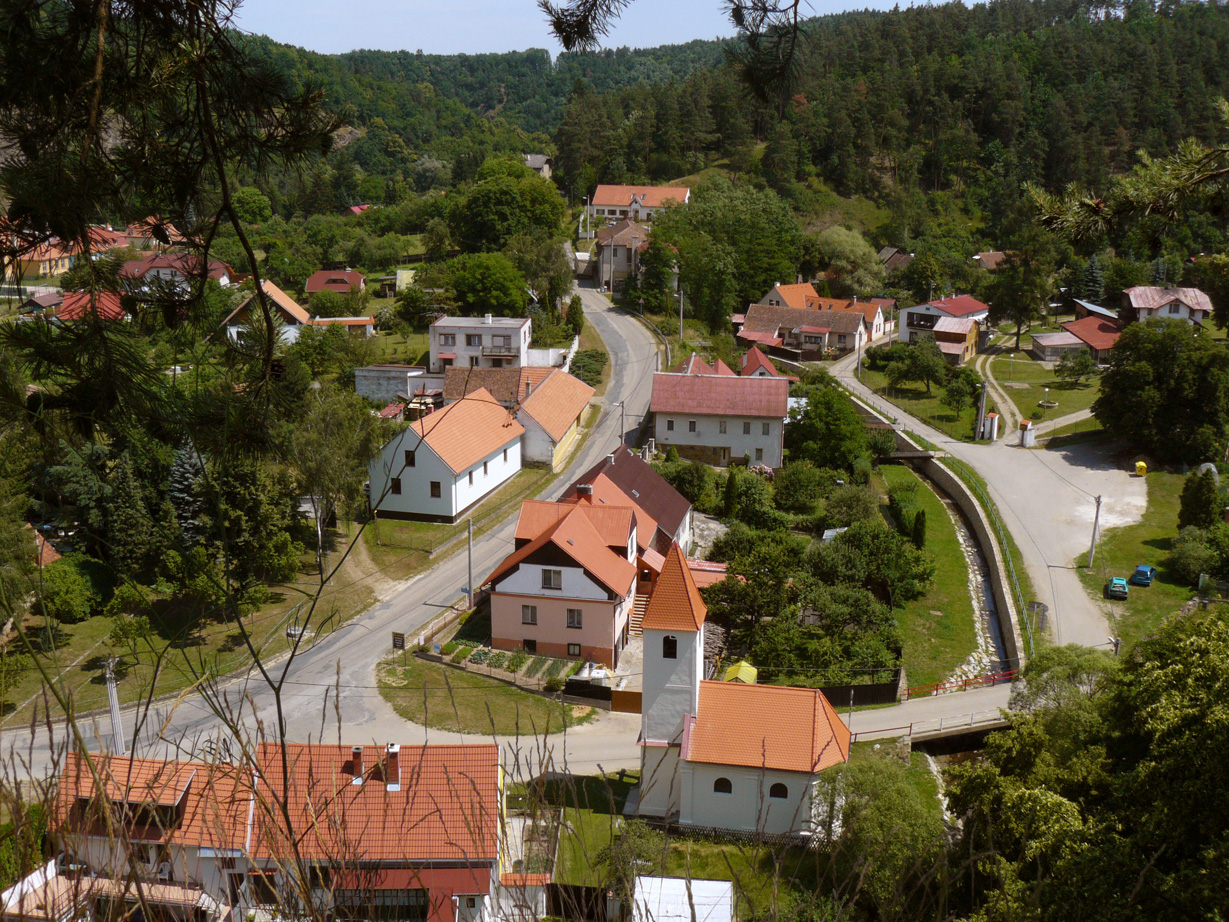
- View from the Frejštejn Castle

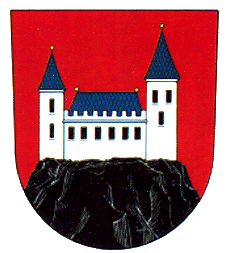
- Coat of arms

- Location in the Czech Republic
- Coordinates: 48°54′1″N 15°41′11″E
- Country: Czech Republic
- Region: South Moravian
- District: Znojmo
- First mentioned: 1250

Area
  - Total: 6.22 km^{2} (2.40 sq mi)
- Elevation: 368 m (1,207 ft)

Population (2026-01-01)
  - Total: 51
  - Density: 8.2/km^{2} (21/sq mi)
- Time zone: UTC+1 (CET)
  - Summer (DST): UTC+2 (CEST)
- Postal code: 671 06
- Website: www.podhradinaddyji.cz

Podhradí nad Dyjí (until 1949 Frejštejn; German: Freistein) is a municipality and village in Znojmo District in the South Moravian Region of the Czech Republic. It has about 50 inhabitants.

Podhradí nad Dyjí lies approximately 27 kilometres (17 mi) west of Znojmo, 77 km (48 mi) south-west of Brno, and 161 km (100 mi) south-east of Prague.

== Demographics ==
Historical population
Year	Pop.	±%
1869	441	—
1880	416	−5.7%
1890	439	+5.5%
1900	423	−3.6%
1910	449	+6.1%
1921	392	−12.7%
1930	361	−7.9%
1950	204	−43.5%
1961	199	−2.5%
1970	124	−37.7%
1980	81	−34.7%
1991	65	−19.8%
2001	51	−21.5%
2011	48	−5.9%
2021	59	+22.9%
Source: Censuses
