= Aaron Padilla (artist) =

American sculptor

Knots, pine sculpture by Aaron Padilla, 2010, Hawaii State Art Museum

Aaron Padilla (born 1974) is an American artist and art educator.

He was born in Wahiawa, Hawaii in 1974. He received a BFA in painting and printmaking from Pacific Lutheran University in 1996, and an MFA in ceramics from the University of Hawaiʻi at Mānoa in 2001. Padilla has taught at the University of Hawaiʻi at Mānoa, the Honolulu Museum of Art and the Hawaii Potters' Guild.

He is currently the Director of Learning and Engagement at the Honolulu Museum of Art. He has created paintings and utilitarian ceramics, as well as abstract and semi-abstract ceramic sculptures. In his current body of work, small angled pieces of wood are assembled to give the illusion of wood being woven or tied into knots.

The Hawaii State Art Museum, the Fendi Foundation for Design, the Judiciary Building at Kapolei, and the Hawaii State Capitol are among the collections holding works by Aaron Padilla.
