= Minoru Ohira =

Japanese artist

Untitled work by Minoru Ohira, graphite, coffee and black powder on Japanese paper, private collection

Minoru Ohira (born 1950) is an artist who was born in Niigata, Japan. He received a Bachelor of Fine Arts degree from Kanazawa City Arts and Crafts College in 1975 and a Masters in Art Education from Tokyo University of the Arts in 1977. From 1979 to 1981, he continued his education at the Mexico National Institute of Art and then moved to California. Minoru is married to artist Echiko Ohira, with whom he has had numerous joint exhibitions.

He creates sculptures from found materials, such as wood, slate, glass. Minoru is also known for his drawings of softly rounded shapes that incorporate unusual substances. The Hara Museum of Contemporary Art (Tokyo), the Honolulu Museum of Art, the Long Beach Museum of Art (Long Beach, California), the Los Angeles County Museum of Art, the National Gallery of Thailand (Bangkok) and the National Museum of Art in Mexico are among the public collections holding work by Minoru Ohira.
