= Janice (given name) =

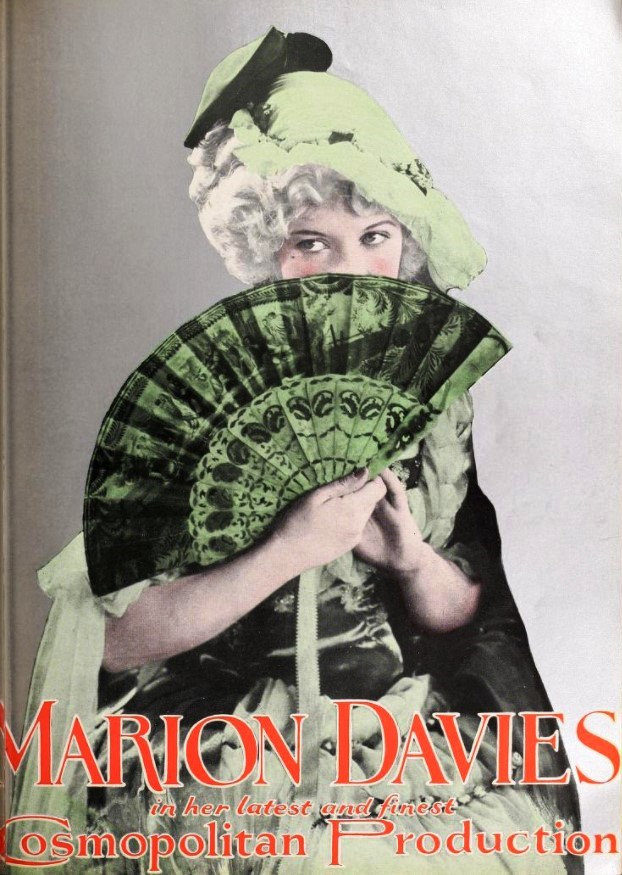
- Marion Davies portrayed Janice Meredith in the 1924 film.
- Gender: Female

Origin
- Origin: Hebrew
- Meaning: God is gracious

Other names
- Related names: Jane, Janiche, Janicke, Janike, Janikke, Jannice, Janniche, Jannike, Jannikke, Janeese, Janis, Janise, Jeanice

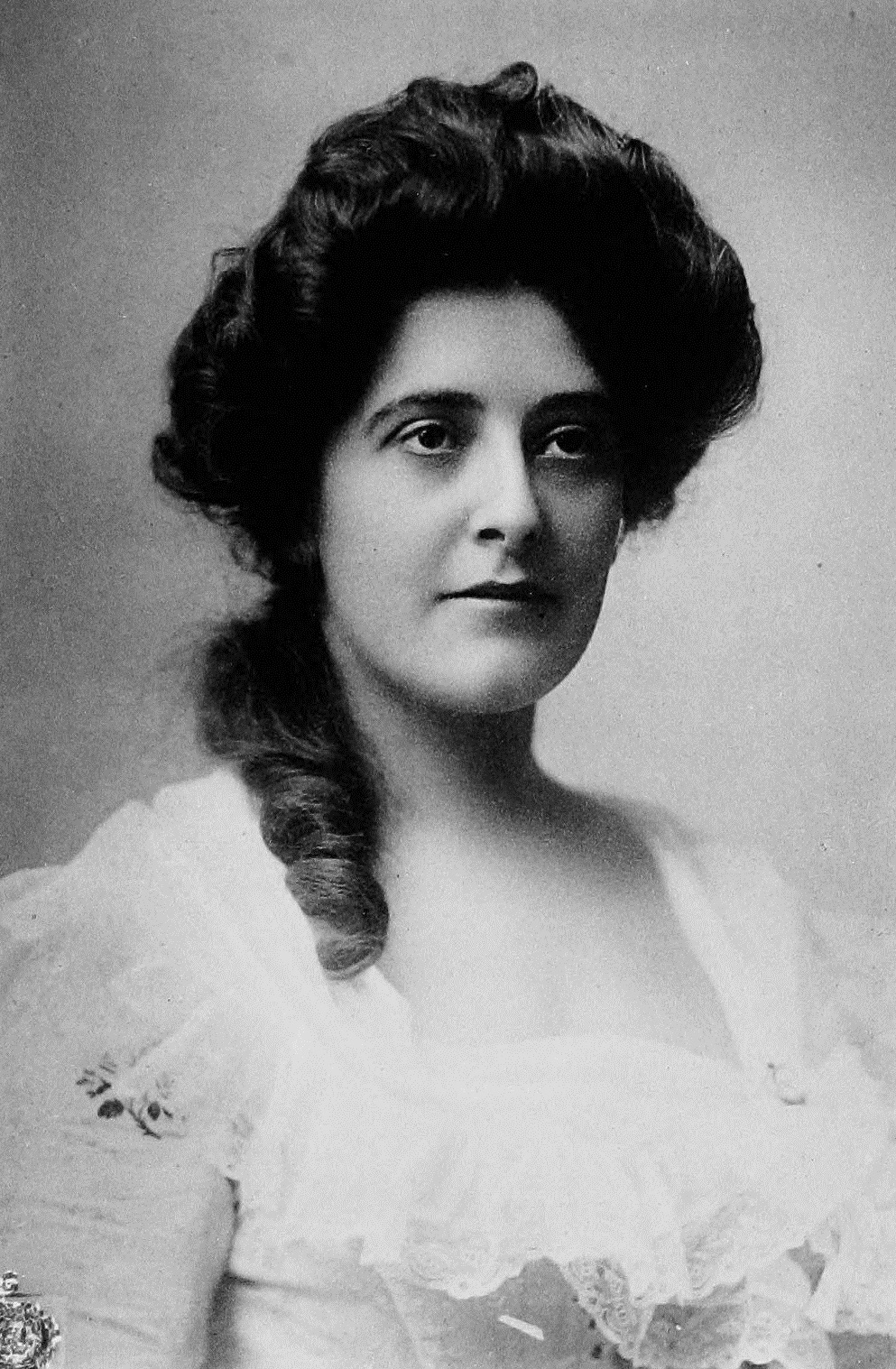
Mary Mannering portrayed Janice Meredith in the 1900 stage play A Colonial Girl based on the 1899 novel by Paul Leicester Ford.

Janice is a modern feminine given name, an extended version of Jane, an English feminine form of John which is itself derived from the Hebrew Yohanan, meaning ('Graced by God') or Yehohanan ('God is gracious'). The name Janice was first used by American author Paul Leicester Ford for the heroine of the 1899 novel Janice Meredith. Janice Meredith was a 1924 silent film based on the novel by Ford and the 1900 stage play A Colonial Girl. Janis is a spelling variant.

== List of people with the given name ==
- Janice Acoose (1954–2020), Canadian writer, filmmaker and professor of indigenous literature in Saskatchewan
- Janice Adair (1905–1996), British actress
- Janice Alatoa (born 1988), Vanuatuan sprinter
- Janice Merrill Allred (born 1947), American theologian
- Janice Argyle, English karateka
- Janice Arnold-Jones (born 1952), American politician
- Janice Atkinson (born 1962), English politician
- Janice Baird, American opera singer
- Janice R. Bellace, American academic
- Janice Bernard (born 1958), Trinidad and Tobago sprinter
- Janice Biala (1903–2000), American artist
- Janice Blackie-Goodine, set decorator
- Janice Boddy, Canadian anthropologist
- Janice Bolland (born 1966), American cyclist
- Janice Bowling (born 1947), American politician
- Janice Lawrence Braxton (born 1962), American women's basketball player
- Janice Bremner (born 1974), Canadian synchronized swimmer
- Janice Rogers Brown (born 1949), American judge
- Janice Burgess (1954–2024), American television producer
- Janice Burton (born 1958), British Paralympic swimmer
- Janice Carroll (1932–1993), American actress
- Janice Cayman (born 1988), Belgian women's footballer
- Janice Chapman (born 1938), Australian opera singer
- Janice Charette, Canadian diplomat
- Janice Chetcuti, Maltese politician
- Janice Chiang (born 1955), American comics artist
- Janice E. Clements, American molecular biologist and virologist
- Janice Cole, American lawyer
- Janice Connolly (born 1953), British actress and comedian
- Janice Cooke, American television director and producer
- Janice Cooper, American politician
- Janice Cooper (athlete) (1940–2002), Australian high jumper
- Janice Cowan, Canadian writer
- Janice Crosio (born 1939), Australian politician
- Janice Shaw Crouse, American educator
- Janice E. Cuny, American computer scientist
- Janice Dean (born 1970), Canadian television meteorologist and writer
- Janice de Belen (born 1968), Filipino actress, model and television host
- Janice Dickinson (born 1955), American model, photographer, writer and talent agent
- Janice Douglas (born 1943), American physician
- Janice Eberly (born c. 1964), American economist
- Janice Eidus, American writer
- Janice Elliott (1931–1995), English writer and journalist
- Janice Erlbaum, American writer and poet
- Janice Felty, American opera singer
- Janice Ferri Esser, American writer
- Janice Filmon, Canadian politician
- Janice Fisher, American politician
- Janice Francis, British karateka
- Janice Moore Fuller (born 1951), American poet and playwright
- Janice Gaines (born 1981), American singer-songwriter
- Janice Galloway (born 1955), Scottish writer
- Janice Gardner (1938–2017), American politician
- Janice Giegler, American politician
- Janice N. Harrington, American poet and writer
- Janice Holt Giles (1905–1979), American writer
- Janice Giteck (born 1946), American classical composer
- Janice Gould (1949–2019), American poet
- Janice Gower, English bowls player
- Janice Gregory (born 1955), Welsh politician
- Janice Grube (born 1971), American singer-songwriter
- Janice Hadlow (born 1957), British television executive
- Janice Hahn (born 1952), American politician
- Janice Hally (born 1959), Scottish writer, screenwriter and playwright
- Janice Hammond, American economist
- Janice Harsanyi (1929–2007), American opera singer
- Janice Hart (born 1955), American politician
- Janice M. Holder (born 1949), American judge
- Janice Bryant Howroyd (born 1952), American businesswoman
- Janice Huff (born 1960), American television meteorologist
- Janice Riggle Huie (born 1946), American United Methodist bishop
- Janice L. Jacobs (born 1946), American diplomat
- Janice Jordan (born 1964), American activist
- Janice Josephs (born 1982), South African heptathlete and long jumper
- Janice Kaplan, American writer, magazine editor and television producer
- Janice Karman (born 1954), American film producer, record producer, singer and voice actress
- Janice Kavander (born 1994), Swedish singer
- Janice Kawaye (born 1970), Japanese American voice actress
- Janice Kulyk Keefer (born 1952), Canadian writer and poet
- Janice Kent, American actress
- Janice Kerbel (born 1969), Canadian artist
- Janice Kim (born 1969), American Go player and writer
- Janice Kluge, American sculptor
- Janice Knickrehm (1925–2013), American actress
- Janice Koh, Singaporean actress
- Janice LaMarre, Canadian classical violinist
- Janice Lachance, American chief executive
- Janice Laking, Canadian politician
- Janice Langbehn (born 1968), American activist
- Janice Law, American writer
- Janice Lawton, British Paralympic athlete
- Janice Y. K. Lee, Hong Kong-born American writer
- Janice leMaistre, Canadian judge
- Janice H. Levin (1913–2001), American philanthropist and art collector
- Janice Loeb (1902–1996), American cinematographer, screenwriter, film director and producer
- Janice Logan (1915–1965), American actress
- Janice Long (1955–2021), English radio broadcaster
- Janice Lourie (born 1930), American computer scientist and graphic artist
- Janice Lowry (1946–2009), American artist
- Janice Lynde (born 1948), American actress
- Janice MacDonald (born 1959), Canadian writer
- Janice MacKinnon (born 1947), Canadian historian and politician
- Janice Man (born 1988), Hong Kong actress and fashion model
- Janice Marturano (born 1957), American writer
- Janice Mason (born 1959), Canadian rower
- Janice McCaffrey (born 1959), Canadian racewalker
- Janice McClain, American singer
- Janice McGeachin (born 1963), American politician
- Janice McKenzie, English actress
- Janice McLaughlin (1942–2021), American nun, missionary, and human rights activist
- Janice McNair (born 1936), American National Football League owner
- Janice Meek (born 1944), British rower
- Janice Metcalf (born 1952), American tennis player
- Janice Miller, American singer
- Janice Min (born 1969), American editor and writer
- Janice Mirikitani (1941–2021), American poet and activist
- Janice Monk (born 1937), Australian-American geographer
- Janice Moodie (born 1973), Scottish golfer
- Janice Morley-Lecomte, Canadian politician
- Janice Moses, Trinidad and Tobago women cricketer
- Janice Munt (born 1955), Australian politician
- Janice Murray (disambiguation), multiple people
- Janice Nadeau (born 1977), Canadian illustrator, art director and animation director
- Janice O'Hara (1918–2001), American baseball player
- Janice Olivencia (born 1982), Puerto Rican golfer
- Janice Pariat, Indian poet and writer
- Janice Parker (born 1937), Australian women cricketer
- Janice Pauls (1952–2017), American politician
- Janice L. Peaslee (born 1935), American politician
- Janice Pendarvis, American singer
- Janice Pennington (born 1942), American model
- Janice Pereira, British Virgin Islands judge
- Janice Kapp Perry (born 1938), American songwriter
- Janice Petersen (born 1977), Australian television presenter
- Janice Pottker, American writer
- Janice Prishwalko, American model and television personality
- Janice Race, American comic book editor
- Janice Radway (born 1949), American literary critic
- Janice Rankin (born 1972), Scottish curler
- Janice Raymond (born 1943), American writer and activist
- Janice Rebibo (1950–2015), American-born Israeli poet
- Janice Redish, American writer
- Janice Reid (born 1947), Australian academic
- Janice Robinson (born 1967), American singer
- Janice Robinson (trombonist) (born 1951), American jazz trombonist
- Janice Romary (1927–2007), American fencer
- Janice Rule (1931–2003), American actress
- Janice Rymer, British gynaecologist
- Janice Sarich (1958–2021), Canadian politician
- Janice Scroggins (1955–2014), American jazz pianist
- Janice Seamon-Molson, American bridge player
- Janice Jordan Shefelman, American writer
- Janice Sherry, Canadian politician
- Janice Stead (born 1940), New Zealand women cricketer
- Janice Stein (born 1943), Canadian academic
- Janice Stork, American politician and businesswoman
- Janice Tanaka, American artist
- Janice Tanton (born 1961), Canadian artist
- Janice Teixeira (born 1962), Brazilian sport shooter
- Janice Torre (1914–1985), American songwriter and lyricist
- Janice Trombly (born 1957), American handball player
- Janice Turner, British journalist
- Janice May Udry (born 1928), American writer
- JaNice Van Ness, American politician
- Janice Vidal (born 1982), Hong Kong singer
- Janice E. Voss (1956–2012), American astronaut
- Janice B. Walker, American mathematician
- Janice Walsh (born 1961), Irish women cricketer
- Janice Weber (born 1950), American pianist and writer
- Janice Underwood, American educator and businesswoman
- Janice Urnstein Weissman (born 1944), American painter
- Janice Wearmouth, British professor of education
- Janice Whaley, American singer-songwriter
- Janice Whitby (born 1950), Canadian-born American actress
- Janice Willett, British television producer
- Janice Savin Williams, American businesswoman
- Janice Woods Windle (born 1938), American writer
- Janice Wong (born 1983), Singaporean pastry chef
- Janice Wright-Cheney, Canadian textile artist
- Janice Wu (born 1992), Chinese actress

== Fictional characters ==
- Janice (Chrono Cross), a character in the video game Chrono Cross
- Janice Battersby, a character in the soap opera Coronation Street
- Janice Garvey, a character in the sitcom Benidorm
- Janice Goralnik, recurring character in the TV Show Friends
- Janice Licalsi, a character in the television series NYPD Blue
- Janice Lincoln, a character and a super villainess in Marvel Comics
- Janice Litman Goralnik, a recurring character in TV show Friends
- Janice Rand, a character in the television series Star Trek: The Original Series
- Janice Soprano, a character in the television series The Sopranos

== See also ==
- Janis (given name)
