= Janis (given name) =

Janis is a given name. Notable people with the name include:

- Jānis Akuraters (1876–1937), Latvian writer
- Janis Amatuzio (born 1950), American forensic pathologist
- Jānis Andriksons (1912–1967), Latvian speed skater
- Janis Antiste (born 2002), French footballer
- Janis Antonovics (born 1942), Latvian-British-American biologist
- Janis Babson (1950–1961), Canadian cancer victim
- Jānis Bērziņš, multiple people
- Janis Birkeland (born 1945), American architect and planner
- Janis Blaswich (born 1991), German footballer
- Janis Brenner, American dance artist, choreographer, and singer
- Janis Bubenko (1935–2022), Swedish computer scientist
- Janis Carter (1913–1994), American actress
- Jānis Čakste (1859–1927), President of Latvia from 1918 to 1927
- Janis Claxton (1964–2018), Australian choreographer
- Jānis Daliņš (1904–1978), Latvian athlete
- Jānis Elsiņš (born 1974), Latvian bobsledder
- Janis Hansen (1940–2021), American talent agent and actress
- Janis Hape (1958–2021), American swimmer
- Janis Hughes (born 1958), British politician
- Janis Ian (born 1951), American songwriter and folksinger
- Jānis Ikaunieks (born 1995), Latvian footballer
- Janis Irwin (born 1984), Canadian politician
- Jānis Jansons (born 1982), Latvian floorball player
- Janis Johnson (born 1946), Canadian politician
- Jānis Joņevs (born 1980), Latvian writer
- Janis Joplin (1943–1970), American singer and songwriter
- Jānis Jurkāns (born 1946), Latvian politician
- Jānis Kalnbērziņš (1893–1986), Latvian politician
- Jānis Karlivāns (born 1982), Latvian decathlete
- Janis Karpinski (born 1953), United States Army officer
- Janis Kazocins (born 1959), British Army officer and Latvian national security consultant
- Janis Kelly (born 1971), Canadian volleyball player
- Janis Kelly, Scottish opera singer
- Jānis Kļaviņš (1933–2008), Latvian chess master
- Jānis Klovāns (1935–2010), Latvian chess player
- Jani Lane (1964–2011), American rock singer
- Jānis Liepiņš, multiple people
- Jānis Līvens (born 16 May 1884, date of death unknown), Latvian cyclist
- Jānis Lūsis (1939–2020), Latvian javelin thrower
- Jānis Mendriks (1907–1953), Latvian Catholic priest and servant of God
- Janis Morweiser (born 1991), German Nordic combined skier
- Janis Oldham (1956–2021), American mathematician
- Janis Paige (1922–2024), American actress
- Jānis Paipals (1871–1911), Latvian cross-country skier
- Janis Paterson (1945–2024), New Zealand academic
- Jānis Poruks (1871–1911), Latvian poet and writer
- Jānis Puriņš (1889–1944), Latvian Riflemen
- Janis Rafailidou (born 1984), Greek artist
- Janis Rozentāls (1866–1916), Latvian painter
- Jānis Rudzutaks (1887–1938), Latvian-Soviet revolutionary and politician
- Janis Scott (1951–2024), American arts patron and transportation advocate
- Janis Siegel (born 1952), American singer
- Jānis Skroderis (born 1983), Latvian tennis player
- Janis Spindel, American matchmaker, author, and entrepreneur
- Jānis Sprukts (born 1982), Latvian ice hockey player
- Jānis Straume (1962–2024), Latvian politician
- Jānis Strēlnieks (born 1989), Latvian basketball player
- Janis Tanaka (born 1963), American bassist
- Jānis Timma (1992–2024), Latvian basketball player
- Jānis Vucāns (born 1956), Latvian politician
- Janis Wilson (1930–2003), American actress
- Janis Winehouse, British pharmacist, mother of Amy Winehouse

== Fictional Characters ==
- Janis Ian, fictional character from the Mean Girls franchise

== See also ==
- Janice (given name)
