= Janice Murray =

Janice Murray may refer to:

- Janice Murray (footballer) (born 1966), English football player
- Janice Murray (psychologist), Canadian–New Zealand academic psychologist
- Janice Murray (speech therapist), speech therapist and professor
