= Sergio Vela =

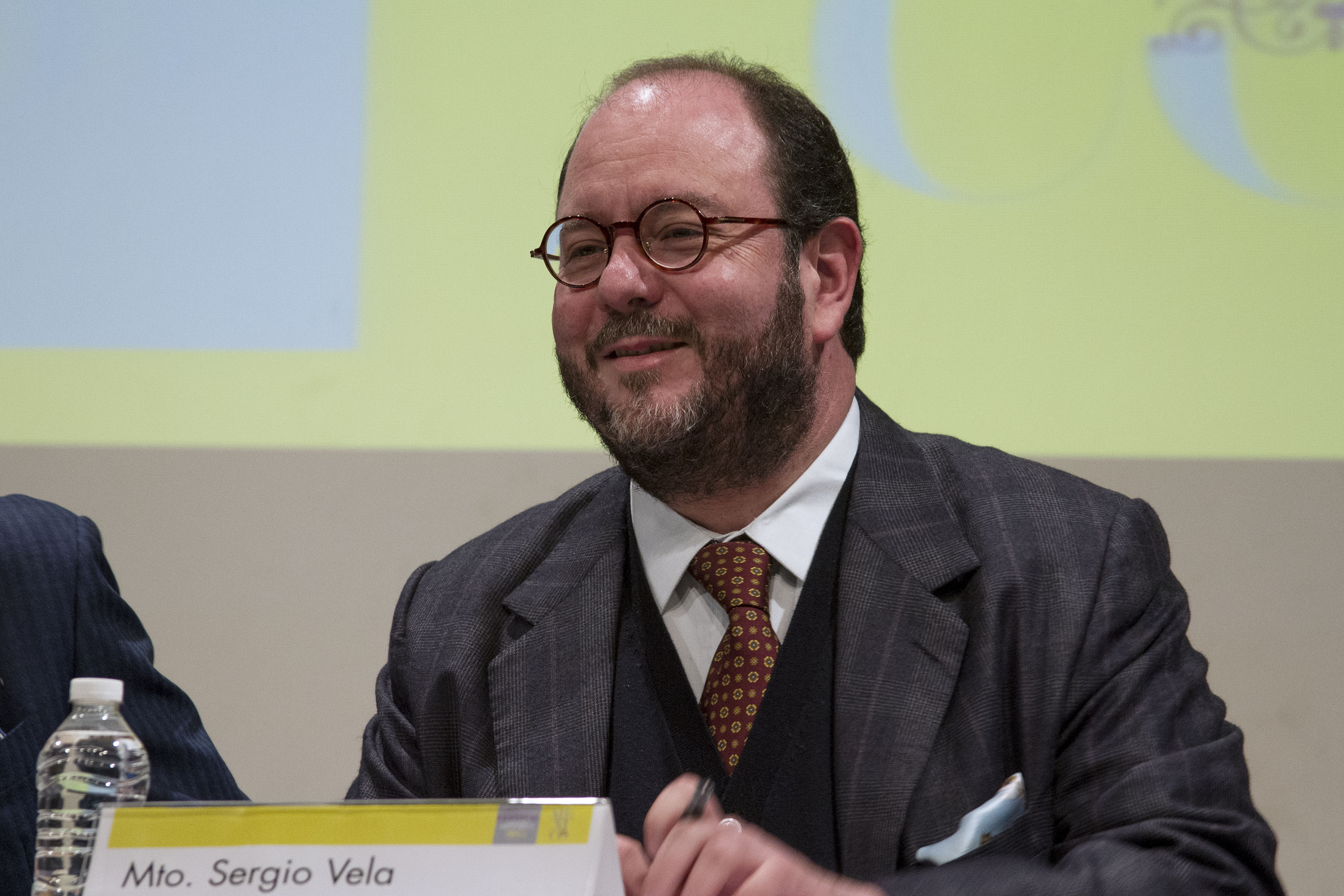
Sergio Vela

Sergio Vela (born June 27, 1964, in Mexico City) is a Mexican-American opera director, designer, radio and television host, musician, lawyer and academician.

== Education ==
He studied piano with Héctor Rojas, singing with Maria Julius, orchestra conducting with Roswitha Heintze (1986) and Murry Sidlin at the Aspen School of Music (1988) and composition (1988–1992) with Humberto Hernández Medrano, a distinguished composer and a pupil of Carlos Chávez. He holds a magna cum laude law degree from the Escuela Libre de Derecho, where he studied from 1882 until 1987. At the same school he was tenure professor of legal history from 1989 until 2012. He also taught criminal law and Roman law at both the Escuela Libre de Derecho and the Universidad Anáhuac.

He made his doctoral studies at the National School of Music of the National Autonomous University of Mexico.

An accomplished polyglot, he is fluent in English, Spanish, French, Italian and German, and he reads, writes and translates other languages, such as Catalan and Portuguese.

== Opera productions and designs ==
His opera productions have been presented in the United States, Germany, Spain, Italy, Ireland, Brazil and Mexico. He made his debut at only 25 at the Palacio de Bellas Artes in 1990, with Faust, by Gounod. At the same venue he has directed La clemenza di Tito (1993), Idomeneo (1998) and Die Zauberflöte (2000) by Mozart, Der fliegende Holländer (1994), Tristan und Isolde (1996) and the first-ever Mexican production of the complete Der Ring des Nibelungen (Das Rheingold, Die Walküre, Siegfried and Götterdämmerung) (2003-2006) by Wagner, the world-premiere of The Visitors (1999) by Carlos Chávez, Macbeth (2001) by Verdi and the Mexican premiere of Die Frau ohne Schatten (2012) by Richard Strauss.

Among his European credits, he has directed and designed Turandot (1996) by Puccini at the Torre del Lago Puccini Festival, Mozart's Così fan tutte at the Mozart Festival in A Coruña (2002), the first modern production of Motezuma (2003) by Gian Francesco de Majo in Aschaffenburg, the first revival of María del Carmen (2003) by Granados at the Wexford Festival Opera, the first performance of the critical edition of La sonnambula (2004) by Bellini at the Teatro Massimo Bellini in Catania, Sicily and the world-premiere of the definitive version of Murmullos del páramo (2006) by Julio Estrada, performed at the Teatro Español (Madrid), the Theaterhaus Stuttgart, the Biennale di Venezia and at the Sala Nezahualcóyotl (Nezahualcóyotl Concert Hall) of the National Autonomous University of Mexico.

He made his American debut at the Virginia Opera in 1994 with Strauss's Salome. In 2013, on occasion of Wagner's bicentennial, he directed and designed Parsifal at the Amazon Theatre in Manaus.

Much attached to Juan Ibáñez (1938-2000), he adapted Ibáñez's Siempre es hoy and directed it in 2000 as a homage to the late director.

At the invitation of Ana Lara, he directed and designed El Cimarrón by Henze at Mexico City's Teatro Helénico in 2001.

== Collaborators ==
His frequent collaborators in his opera productions are costume designer Violeta Rojas, choreographer Ruby Tagle, visual artist Ghiju Díaz de León, technician Iván Cervantes, executive producer Juliana Vanscoit and assistant directors Paulina Franch and Marielle Kahn.

In the past, he has also counted on the collaboration of many relevant designers, such as Alejandro Luna, Jorge Ballina, Philippe Amand, Tolita Figueroa, María Figueroa, Giusi Giustino, Donna Zakowska, Hugh Landwehr, Mónica Raya, Eloise Kazan, Cristiana Aureggi, Nikos Petropoulos and Víctor Zapatero, as well as assistant directors Hernán del Riego and Daniele De Plano choreographer and dancer Victoria Gutiérrez and actress Margarita Sanz.

Being trained on both musical and dramatic arts, his collaboration with conductors has been consistently deep and fruitful. Among those who have conducted his productions are Antoni Ros-Marbà, Luiz Fernando Malheiro, Guido Maria Guida, Marko Letonja, Antonio Florio, Max Bragado-Darman, Carlos Miguel Prieto, Stefano Ranzani, Rico Saccani, José Areán John DeMain, Enrique Diemecke and Peter Mark.

Among the singers that have taken part in his productions are Ramón Vargas, Francisco Araiza, Kolos Kováts, Ghena Dimitrova, Katia Ricciarelli, Paata Burchuladze, Rolando Villazón, Jon Frederic West, Luana DeVol, Greer Grimsley, Janice Baird, Richard Paul Fink, and many others.

== Cultural promotion ==
From 1989 until 1992 he was artistic manager and director of the Bellas Artes Opera; from 1992 to 2000 he was director general of the Festival Internacional Cervantino; he was also coordinator of the 2000 Cultural Program: From the 20th Century to the Third Millennium and from 2001 until 2006 he was general music director of the National Autonomous University of Mexico. He was the president of the National Council for Culture and the Arts (CONACULTA) during beginning of the presidency of Felipe Calderón, from 2006 until 2009.

During his tenure at the National Council for Culture and the Arts, at his initiative, an inclusive cultural policy implying the systematic and fruitful collaboration between the private and public sectors was firmly rooted; a much-praised and comprehensive National Culture Program was presented; the artists supported by the Fondo Nacional para la Cultura y las Artes (FONCA) received a substantial increase on the monthly allowances and grants; an unprecedented increase on the public cultural budget was achieved; a National Culture Conference with the egalitarian participation of the Federal Government, the Mexico City Government and each of the State Governments and special committee for deciding the Federal financial support for cultural initiatives with full transparency were formally established; an annual minimum of Federal financial resources was decided for guaranteeing the strength of each of the States in cultural matters; the first Ibero-American Film Congress was held in Mexico and it was opened by President Felipe Calderón and Felipe, Prince of Asturias; the technical renewal of the Palacio de Bellas Artes was conceived; a deep updating of Mexico's international cultural relations took place; remarkable exhibitions of Mexican art and on the History of Mexico were presented at top museums in Paris, London, Madrid, Berlin, Zürich, Los Angeles, Chicago, Washington, Buenos Aires, Santiago and Tokyo, among other cities; the Carlos Chávez Youth Orchestra was completely renewed; the Paris [Salon du livre] was dedicated to Mexico in 2009 and a Mexican Year in France was decreed for 2010; a much-expected Ley del libro (Book Law) was promulgated; an ambitious program for updating the historical theatrical venues and other cultural infrastructure was started; a new and consistent National Theatre Company (Compañía Nacional de Teatro de México) was founded; a sound collaboration between the National Council for Culture and the Arts and the Cultural Commissions of the Senate of the Republic and of the Chamber of Deputies proved to be especially fruitful, and a Constitutional amendment for protecting and promoting the culture and the arts was agreed, with the support of all the political parties.

== Recent activities as artistic promoter ==
He is senior artistic advisor to the Orquesta Sinfónica de Minería and is artistic director of the Festival de México en el Centro Histórico and of the Festival de Música de Morelia. He is founder and curator of a free on-line musical quarterly, Quodlibet. He is consultant for several cultural institutions

He has lectured extensively on opera, music, the arts and the humanities, at several academic institutions and cultural organizations, such as the National Autonomous University of Mexico, the Instituto Tecnológico Autónomo de México (ITAM), the Universidad Iberoamericana, the Centro Nacional de las Artes, the Instituto Nacional de Bellas Artes, the Universidad Panamericana, the Fundación Miguel Alemán, the Asociación Filarmónica Mozart, the ProÓpera group, the Centro de Estudios Casa Lamm, among others. At the Auditorio Nacional, he gives regular introductory lectures to the HD Broadcasts of the Metropolitan Opera House.

== Cultural radio and television broadcasts ==
For many years, he has hosted a weekly radio broadcast on opera, La ópera en el tiempo, every Sunday at 5:00 pm (CST), on Opus 94.5 of the Instituto Mexicano de la Radio (IMER). He is also host of the Saturday broadcasts of the Metropolitan Opera International Radio Network.

He has collaborated with TV UNAM and Once TV, and for 12 years (1994 and 2006) he hosted the weekly international opera broadcasts of Canal 22.

== Awards and decorations ==
- He received the Mozart Medal from the Austrian Embassy in 2006 for his work as an artistic promoter.
- In 1999, he was awarded the Order of Arts and Letters from France (Ordre des Arts et des Lettres).
- In 2000, the Order of Merit of the Federal Republic of Germany (Bundesverdienstkreuz).
- In 2000, the Order of Merit of the Italian Republic (Ordine al Merito della Repubblica Italiana).
- In 2006, the Order of Isabella the Catholic (Orden de Isabel la Católica) from Spain.
- In 2009, the Order of the Dannebrog (Dannebrogordenen) from Denmark.

== Publications ==
He has written and published a large amount of essays on art and the humanities, as well as poetic prose in several languages. A non-exhaustive list of such writings include:

- Palabras de amor y gratitud de un intruso bendecido: el corpus creativo de Ernesto de la Peña (2014)
- No el hallazgo de la felicidad, sino la felicidad del hallazgo (2014)
- Memoria del lúgubre zureo (2013)
- La magia illesa del dinasta Klingsor (2013)
- Del hilemorfismo y los fantasmas en las fazañas del Faisán (2013)
- Figment in the Manner of an Epistle (Figuración a manera de epístola) (2012)
- Egmont. Versión narrativa de la tragedia de Goethe con música de Beethoven, tras Grillparzer (2012)
- Lob des hohen Verstands (2010)
- Sueño de un concierto de verano (Performing Narration to Mendelssohn's A Midsummer Night's Dream) (2009)
- Elogio de la sutileza (2008)
- Élan d'amour (2007)
- El espíritu de juego: cuestiones sobre educación artística y cultura (2007)
- Mar de por medio (cuestiones amerindias) (2007)
- Atlàntida: narración para la cantata escénica (2006)
- Isagoge, improvisaciones póstumas y epílogo sobre La flauta mágica (2006)
- Le regret de Selim (2006)
- Oratio in memoriam clarissimum amicus amicorum (2005)
- Excursión en torno a la naturaleza de la música (2004)
- Zum Kurt Pahlens Abschied (2003)
- Isagoge y cincuenta cuestiones a vuelapluma en torno al arte y el ácido desoxirribonucléico, a cincuenta años de un fasto inmarcesible (2003)
- Non può quel che vuole, vorrà quel che può (2002)
- El anillo del nibelungo en breve (2002)
- Duelo por el corazón acorazado (2001)
- El sibarita o del champaña (2001)
- Eirene ancilla sophiae (2000)
- Summus finis (2000)
- Desde esta ladera (2000)
- Elogio de las cumbres (2000)
- Goethe y la música (1999)
- Res severa uerum gaudium: The Visitors de Carlos Chávez (1999)
- La gracia francesa (1999)
- Glosa mínima a Arístides y a Kant (1998)
- Otras Noches Áticas (1997)
- Recensión a manera de pre-ludio (comentarios sobre estética a partir de Schiller) (1996)
- El arte lógica (notas sobre estética a partir de Heidegger) (1995)
- Celebración del arte fausta (cuestiones etimológicas) (1994)
- Donde se dice que el sol es nuevo cada día (glosas heraclitianas) (1993)
- Don Quijote y el derecho penal (1992)
- Sobre la permeabilidad de los Campos Elíseos (1989)
- La legiferancia y la prudencia (1988)

== Personal life ==
Born to a cultivated family with roots in northern Mexico, southern Spain and the United States, his late father was the distinguished lawyer and academician Sergio Vela Treviño (1930-1993), and his mother is American-born Elena Vela Treviño, who studied at the Art Institute of Chicago and is acknowledged as a songwriter with the name of Nina Mares.

In 1991 he married Spanish-Mexican lawyer Marta Fuentes, and they have two daughters: Isolda María (born 1996) and Julia María (born 1999). Since her childhood, Isolda has taken part in several of her father's productions.

The couple divorced in 2005. Between 2008 and 2014 he was married haute cuisine chef Martha Ortiz.
