= The Millionaire Matchmaker =

American reality television series

- Genre: Reality
- Starring: Patti Stanger
- Country of origin: United States
- Original language: English
- No. of seasons: 8
- No. of episodes: 106

Production
- Executive producers: Kevin Dill; Mechelle Collins; Patti Stanger; Robert Lee; Tracy Mazuer
- Running time: 40 to 43 minutes
- Production companies: Bayonne Entertainment; Intuitive Entertainment

Original release
- Network: Bravo
- Release: January 22, 2008 – March 29, 2015

The Millionaire Matchmaker is an American reality television series on Bravo that premiered on January 22, 2008, and is hosted by Patti Stanger. The Millionaire Matchmaker follows Patti Stanger, owner of the Beverly Hills-based "Millionaire's Club" dating service, as she matches single wealthy people with closely compatible dates. The seventh season premiered on December 5, 2013, with an all-new panel of matchmakers.

In July 2015, Stanger announced that she had left the network after eight seasons and 90 episodes. It was later announced that she will be producing another show on WE tv. The new series, entitled Million Dollar Matchmaker, premiered on July 8, 2016.

Millionaire followed the "pioneering" matchmaking show Confessions of a Matchmaker.

== Cast ==
- Patti Stanger (seasons 1–8), CEO of Millionaire's Club, former assistant to pioneering matchmaker, Janis Spindel
- Destin Pfaff (seasons 1–6), Executive assistant in the first season; promoted to chief operating officer in the second season
- Rachel Federoff (seasons 1–6), Office assistant in the seasons one to three; promoted to vice president of matching in the fourth season
- Chelsea Autumn (seasons 1–3), Vice president of matching
- Alison Standish (season 1), Club representative in sales
- Andreea Simmel (season 4), Intern
- Mara (seasons 5–6), Recruiter
- Justin Bird (season 7), Matchmaker
- Marisa Saks (season 7), Matchmaker
- David Cruz (seasons 7–8), Matchmaker
- Candace Smith (season 8)

=== Timeline ===
Cast Members	Seasons							
Cast Members	1	2	3	4	5	6	7	8
Alison Standish	Main							
Chelsea Autumn	Main	Main	Main					
Destin Pfaff	Main	Main	Main	Main	Main	Main		
Patti Stanger	Main	Main	Main	Main	Main	Main	Main	Main
Rachel Federoff	Main	Main	Main	Main	Main	Main		
Andreea Simmel				Main				
Mara					Main	Main		
David Cruz							Main	Main
Justin Bird							Main	
Marisa Saks							Main	
Candace Smith								Main

== Episodes ==
=== Series overview ===
Season	Episodes	Originally released	
Season	Episodes	First released	Last released
1	7	January 22, 2008	March 4, 2008
2	12	February 12, 2009	May 7, 2009
3	13	January 19, 2010	April 20, 2010
4	12	October 19, 2010	January 11, 2011
5	15	August 15, 2011	December 6, 2011
6	13	January 10, 2013	April 9, 2013
7	18	December 5, 2013	April 20, 2014
8	15	December 7, 2014	March 29, 2015

=== Season 1 (2008) ===
No. overall	No. in season	Title	Original release date
1	1	"Dave and Harold"	January 22, 2008
2	2	"Jeff and Julien"	January 29, 2008
3	3	"Lonnie and Patrick"	February 5, 2008
4	4	"Peter and Tai and German"	February 12, 2008
5	5	"Xander and Joseph"	February 19, 2008
6	6	"Robby and Brendan"	February 26, 2008
7	7	"Heinz and Paul"	March 4, 2008

=== Season 2 (2009) ===
No. overall	No. in season	Title	Original release date
8	1	"Brett and David"	February 12, 2009
9	2	"Heidi and Bill"	February 19, 2009
10	3	"Andrew and Laurence"	February 26, 2009
11	4	"Harold and Jeff"	March 5, 2009
12	5	"Chris and Daniel"	March 12, 2009
13	6	"Shauna and Dave"	March 19, 2009
14	7	"Matt and Jimmy D"	March 26, 2009
15	8	"Paul and Alex"	April 2, 2009
16	9	"Michael and Dr. Robert"	April 16, 2009
17	10	"Zagros and Uri"	April 23, 2009
18	11	"Farrah and Kevin"	April 30, 2009
19	12	"Kevin and Anthony"	May 7, 2009

=== Season 3 (2010) ===
No. overall	No. in season	Title	Original release date
20	1	"Omar and Nick"	January 19, 2010
21	2	"Justin and Tyler"	January 26, 2010
Guests: Tyler Barnett and Justin Shenkarow
22	3	"Shauna and Michael"	February 2, 2010
23	4	"Smike and Rupert"	February 9, 2010
24	5	"Jason and David"	February 16, 2010
25	6	"Jimmy D and Mateo"	March 2, 2010
26	7	"Trevor and Tricia"	March 9, 2010
27	8	"Douglas and Nicole"	March 16, 2010
28	9	"Ayinde and Will"	March 23, 2010
29	10	"Justin and Kevin"	March 30, 2010
30	11	"Hillel and Dylan"	April 6, 2010
31	12	"Greg and Zagros"	April 13, 2010
32	13	"Reunion"	April 20, 2010

=== Season 4 (2010-11) ===
No. overall	No. in season	Title	Original release date
33	1	"Welcome to the Big Apple"	October 19, 2010
34	2	"Jersey in the House"	October 26, 2010
Guest: Caroline Manzo
35	3	"Brooklyn vs. Botox"	November 2, 2010
36	4	"House of Cards"	November 9, 2010
Note: One of this episodes' contestants David Yontef would later claim the show was faked.
37	5	"Dateapause"	November 16, 2010
38	6	"Cinderella and Moondoogie Walk Into a Bar"	November 23, 2010
39	7	"Opposites Don't Attract"	November 30, 2010
Guest: Lillian Glass
40	8	"Divorced From Reality"	December 7, 2010
41	9	"Cooking and Queening"	December 14, 2010
Guest: Judith Regan
42	10	"Cookies and Ice, and Everything Nice"	December 28, 2010
43	11	"Hello Kitty in a One-Horse Town"	January 4, 2011
44	12	"Fred-Ex Delivers"	January 11, 2011
Guest: Freddie Mitchell

=== Season 5 (2011) ===
No. overall	No. in season	Title	Original release date
45	1	"There's No Place Like Home"	August 15, 2011
46	2	"The Chauvinist and the Playboy"	August 22, 2011
Guest: Tori Spelling
47	3	"The Prince and I"	August 29, 2011
Note: Prince Mario Max Oliver Edward George, Prince Schaumburg-Lippe stars in this episode.
48	4	"Mama's Boy Meets Southern Gentleman"	September 8, 2011
49	5	"The Boys Are Back in Town"	September 15, 2011
Note: Madison Hildebrand makes an appearance in this episode.
50	6	"The Plastic Surgeon & the Pole Dancer"	September 22, 2011
51	7	"Helping the Self-Helpers"	September 25, 2011
52	8	"A Tale of Two Nice Guys"	October 6, 2011
53	9	"The Brothers Cruz"	October 13, 2011
54	10	"The Young and the Loveless"	November 1, 2011
Guest: Jenny McCarthy; Note: Trisha Paytas makes an appearance in this episode.
55	11	"Mr. Las Vegas and Mr. Personality"	November 8, 2011
56	12	"The Player and the Piano Player"	November 15, 2011
Guest: Marcellus Wiley
57	13	"Patti Meets Her Match"	November 22, 2011
58	14	"Reunion: Part 1"	November 29, 2011
Note: Andy Cohen hosted this season's reunion.
59	15	"Reunion: Part 2"	December 6, 2011

=== Season 6 (2013) ===
No. overall	No. in season	Title	Original release date	U.S. viewers (millions)
60	1	"Wounded Wally and the Mama's Boy"	January 10, 2013	1.40
61	2	"Dr. Frankenstein & Mr. Hip Hop"	January 17, 2013	0.99
62	3	"A Tale of Two Jimmys"	January 24, 2013	1.11
63	4	"Denise Richard's Dad Is Looking for Love"	January 29, 2013	1.15
64	5	"Alpha Females"	February 5, 2013	1.02
65	6	"The Dancer and the Wrestler"	February 19, 2013	0.82
66	7	"The Return of Robin Kassner"	February 26, 2013	1.09
67	8	"Sweet Yigit and Johnny Limousine"	March 5, 2013	1.14
Note: Yiğit Pura stars in this episode.
68	9	"The NFL Kicker and the Workaholic"	March 12, 2013	1.30
Note: Mitch Berger stars in this episode and John Salley makes an appearance.
69	10	"Patti Meets Her Mate"	March 19, 2013	1.41
70	11	"The Olympian and the Rock Star"	March 26, 2013	1.07
Note: Allison Baver and Adam Gaynor appear in this episode.
71	12	"The Red-Headed Mixer"	March 28, 2013	0.99
72	13	"The Magnificent Seth Meets Party Marty"	April 9, 2013	0.92

=== Season 7 (2013–14) ===
No. overall	No. in season	Title	Original release date	U.S. viewers (millions)
73	1	"Softy Swayze and the Boy in a Bubble"	December 5, 2013	0.87
Note: Don Swayze stars in this episode.
74	2	"The Know-It-All and Bigger Better Berman"	December 12, 2013	1.08
Note: Jonathan Cheban stars in this episode, and jeweler Jacob Arabo makes an appearance.
75	3	"Courtney and the Peacock"	December 19, 2013	1.10
76	4	"The Running Man and Great Expectations"	December 26, 2013	1.19
77	5	"The Late Bloomer and The Gay Hugh Hefner"	January 2, 2014	1.34
Note: Andrew Christian stars in this episode and Guinevere Turner makes an appearance.
78	6	"Mr. Superficial and the Nutjob Magnet"	January 9, 2014	1.39
79	7	"The Shy Extrovert and The Rescuer"	January 16, 2014	1.00
Note: Fiona Forbes stars in this episode.
80	8	"Kid In A Candy Store And Groundhog Day"	January 23, 2014	1.17
Note: Stefan Richter stars in this episode.
81	9	"Workaholics"	January 30, 2014	0.89
Note: Katrina Parker stars in this episode.
82	10	""Mr. President" Meets the "Beverly Hillbilly""	February 6, 2014	1.05
83	11	"The Trust Fund Brat & the Cliffdiver"	February 27, 2014	0.87
Note: Ian Bernardo and Jeff Ogden star in this episode and Carson Kressley makes an appearance.
84	12	"The Technical Brain and Moonstruck"	March 6, 2014	0.89
85	13	"The Fixer and the Dick"	March 13, 2014	0.87
86	14	"Frat Brat and Numb With Fear"	March 20, 2014	0.83
87	15	"Make Time for Love and Betting on Change"	March 27, 2014	0.78
88	16	"Return of the Tough Teddy Bear and the Shredder"	April 3, 2014	0.66
89	17	"The Narcissist Meets the Inner Geek"	April 10, 2014	0.70
Note: Justin Ross Lee stars in this episode.
90	18	"NeNe's Bridesmaids"	April 20, 2014	1.86
91	19	"Patti Uncensored: Three Dates Gone Wrong"	April 22, 2014	N/A

=== Season 8 (2014–15) ===
No. overall	No. in season	Title	Original release date	U.S. viewers (millions)
92	1	"Larry Birkhead & Melyssa Ford"	December 7, 2014	N/A
93	2	"Chilli and Jeff Ogden"	December 14, 2014	N/A
94	3	"Ally Shapiro, Jill Zarin and Prince Ferdinand"	January 1, 2015	N/A
Note: Ally Shapiro is the daughter of Jill Zarin. Prince Maximilian Ferdinand Von Anhalt, son of Frédéric Prinz von Anhalt, stars in this episode.
95	4	"Perez Hilton and Sonja Morgan"	January 8, 2015	N/A
96	5	"Stephanie Pratt, Spencer Pratt, Heidi Montag, Kari Whitman"	January 15, 2015	N/A
Note: Stephanie Pratt and Kari Whitman star in this episode.
97	6	"Marysol Patton and Luke Rockhold"	January 22, 2015	N/A
98	7	"Chris Manzo and Max Hodges"	February 5, 2015	N/A
Note: Chris Manzo is the son of Caroline Manzo and Max Hodges used to work for TMZ as a reporter.
99	8	"Allison Baver and Devin Alexander"	February 12, 2015	N/A
100	9	"Jesse Kovacs and A.J. Johnson"	February 19, 2015	N/A
101	10	"Julissa Bermudez and Adam O'Rourke"	February 19, 2015	N/A
102	11	"Romeo Miller"	March 1, 2015	N/A
103	12	"Sheree Whitfield and Sam Querrey"	March 8, 2015	N/A
104	13	"Brooklyn Tankard and Amit Ram"	March 15, 2015	N/A
105	14	"Kenya Moore and Taylor Dayne"	March 22, 2015	N/A
106	15	"Dina Lohan and Peter Marc Jacobson"	March 29, 2015	N/A
