= Fredda Blanchard-Fields =

American gerontologist (1948–2010)

- Born: September 19, 1948; Santa Monica, California
- Died: August 3, 2010 (aged 61); Atlanta
- Education: Wayne State University
- Awards: Distinguished Mentor Award of the American Psychological Association
- Scientific career
- Fields: Cognitive aging
- Workplaces: Louisiana State University, Georgia Institute of Technology

Fredda Blanchard-Fields (September 19, 1948 – August 3, 2010) was a professor of psychology at the Georgia Institute of Technology's School of Psychology. As director of the "School of Psychology’s Adult Development Laboratory", Blanchard-Fields led research efforts that address social-cognitive processes in everyday life, from adolescence to older adulthood. Recognizing that a great deal of psychological research has focused on ways in which cognitive abilities in adulthood decline with older age, Blanchard-Fields, as a gerontologist, and her colleagues focused on investigating domains in which adults continue to grow and develop throughout the lifespan and contribute to their competence in the social realm.

== Biography ==
Blanchard-Fields was born September 19, 1948, in Santa Monica, California. Blanchard-Fields grew up in California for most of her life where she attended San Diego State University and received her undergraduate degree from the University of California, Los Angeles. She received her Ph.D. in Developmental Psychology at Wayne State University in 1983. Following her doctoral work at Wayne University, she joined the faculty at Louisiana State University, where she taught for 10 years before joining the Georgia Institute of Technology in 1993.

Blanchard-Fields was the mother of two sons. She died from complications of cancer on August 3, 2010, in Atlanta. She was 61 years old and lived in Atlanta since 1993 in the Little Five Points area. As well as a research psychologist as well as a career and life mentor to many students and faculty, Blanchard-Fields was a world traveler and an enthusiastic dancer.

== Career highlights and accomplishments ==
A psychology professor at the Georgia Institute of Technology's School of Psychology, Blanchard-Fields served as an associate editor of the journal Psychology and Aging since 2003, with previous experience as an action editor and an editorial board member since 1999. In addition, she was awarded the Distinguished Mentor Award of the American Psychological Association in 2005. She was a member of multiple boards including the Scientific Advisory Board for Bremen International Graduate School of Social Sciences, Committee on Future Directions in Social Aging Research, and Federal Advisory Committee for the United States Social Security Administration.

During 2007, Blanchard-Fields was the Chair of the Grant Review Panel – Neuroeconomics and Aging, The National Institute of Health. She also had professional affiliations with the American Psychological Association, American Psychological Society, Gerontological Society of America, Society for Research in Child Development, Psychonomic Society, and Southeastern Center for Applied Cognitive Aging Research.

Blanchard-Fields was appointed Chair of the School of Psychology at Georgia Institute of Technology in June 2009, after having served for a year as interim chair.

== Selected publications ==
- Blanchard-Fields, Fredda (1986). "Reasoning on social dilemmas varying in emotional saliency: An adult developmental perspective". Psychology and Aging. 1 (4): 325–333. doi:10.1037/0882-7974.1.4.325. PMID 3267414.
- Watson, Tonya L.; Blanchard-Fields, Fredda (1 September 1998). "Thinking with Your Head and Your Heart: Age Differences in Everyday Problem-Solving Strategy Preferences". Aging, Neuropsychology, and Cognition. 5 (3): 225–240. doi:10.1076/anec.5.3.225.613. PMID 25233062.
- Blanchard-Fields, F., & Cooper, C. (2003). Social cognition and social relationships. In Lang, F., & Fingerman, K. (Eds.). Personal Relationships Across the Lifespan. New York: Cambridge.
- Blanchard-Fields, Fredda (February 2007). "Everyday Problem Solving and Emotion: An Adult Developmental Perspective". Current Directions in Psychological Science. 16 (1): 26–31. doi:10.1111/j.1467-8721.2007.00469.x. S2CID 145645352.
- Blanchard-Fields, F; Mienaltowski, A; Seay, RB (Jan 2007). "Age differences in everyday problem-solving effectiveness: older adults select more effective strategies for interpersonal problems". The Journals of Gerontology. Series B, Psychological Sciences and Social Sciences. 62 (1): P61-4. doi:10.1093/geronb/62.1.p61. PMID 17284559.
- Blanchard-Fields, Fredda; Coats, Abby Heckman (2008). "The experience of anger and sadness in everyday problems impacts age differences in emotion regulation". Developmental Psychology. 44 (6): 1547–1556. doi:10.1037/a0013915. PMID 18999321.
- Stanley, Jennifer Tehan; Blanchard-Fields, Fredda (2008). "Challenges older adults face in detecting deceit: The role of emotion recognition". Psychology and Aging. 23 (1): 24–32. doi:10.1037/0882-7974.23.1.24. PMID 18361651.
