= Rymer =

Rymer may refer to:

== Surname ==
- James Malcolm Rymer (1814–1884), Scottish writer of penny dreadfuls
- Janice Rymer, British consultant gynaecologist
- Józef Rymer (1882–1922), Polish and Silesian activist and politician
- Laurie Rymer, (b. 1934), Australian rules footballer
- Michael Rymer (b. 1963), Australian television and film director
- Pamela Ann Rymer (1941–2011), United States federal judge
- Russ Rymer, author and freelance journalist
- Terry Rymer (b. 1967), English motorcycle road racer and truck racer
- Thomas Rymer (c. 1643–1713), English historiographer royal
- Thomas A. Rymer (1925–2016), American politician and judge
- Kye Rymer, British Virgin Islands politician

== Given name ==
- Rymer Liriano (b. 1991), Dominican professional baseball outfielder
- Rymer Point, cape in the Canadian Arctic territory of Nunavut

== See also ==
Paddle and rymer weir, an old type of weir
