= Jason Probst =

American politician

Member of the Kansas House of Representatives from the 102nd district
- In office June 26, 2017 – January 13, 2025
- Preceded by: Patsy Terrell
- Succeeded by: Kyler Sweely

Personal details
- Party: Democratic
- Children: 2
- Education: Hutchinson Community College; Baker University
- Occupation: Freelance Writer

Jason Probst is an American politician. He served as a Democratic member of the Kansas House of Representatives, representing District 102 from 2017 to 2025.

== Political career ==
In 2017, Probst was selected to fill the District 102 seat in the Kansas House of Representatives, after the death of former representative Patsy Terrell. He was elected unopposed to a full term in 2018, and is running again in 2020. He lost re-election in 2024 to Republican Kyler Sweely.

As of June 2020, Probst sits on the following committees:

- Rural Revitalization (Ranking Minority Member)
- Commerce, Labor and Economic Development
- Agriculture
- 2019 Special Committee on Natural Resources
