= Janice Murray (psychologist) =

New Zealand psychologist

Academic background
- Education: Dalhousie University, University of Waterloo, University of Waterloo
- Thesis: The role of spatial separability and attention in dichotic listening (1987)
- Academic advisor: Peter W. Jusczyk

Janice Elizabeth Murray is a Canadian–New Zealand academic psychologist, and is professor emerita at the University of Otago. Her research focuses on object and face recognition, and age-related changes in perception.

== Early life and education ==
Murray was born and raised in a small town in Nova Scotia. As an undergraduate at Dalhousie University, Murray studied infant language acquisition and speech perception under Professor Peter Jusczyk. She followed this with a Masters degree and a PhD titled The role of spatial separability and attention in dichotic listening both at the University of Waterloo.

== Academic career ==
Murray spent two years doing postdoctoral research at the University of Auckland. She returned to Canada, but had decided to make New Zealand her home, and accepted a lectureship position at the University of Otago, arriving with a young family in 1991. Murray was appointed associate professor in 2016, and full professor at the beginning of 2021. Her inaugural professorial lecture in July of that year coincided with her retirement, and she was subsequently appointed professor emerita.

From 2013 Murray was the Associate Dean (Academic), Sciences, and the Deputy Pro-Vice-Chancellor, Sciences from 2017. She led the development of the several multidisciplinary degrees at Otago. Murray supervised 40 postgraduate students to completion.

Murray's research began with infant speech recognition and language acquisition, and progressed to include object and face recognition, and changes in perception due to age. She collaborated on a face perception study with Daphne Maurer of McMaster University. She was part of a team that found older people are less good at recognising emotions in other people, and less good at lying, and at detecting lies by others.

== Selected works ==
- Murray, Janice; E Yong; Rhodes, Gillian Isobel (2000). "Revisiting the perception of upside-down faces". Psychological Science. 11 (6): 492–496. doi:10.1111/1467-9280.00294. PMID 11202495. Wikidata Q52139846.
- Ted Ruffman; Janice Murray; Halberstadt, Jamin; Tina Vater (2011). "Age-related differences in deception" (PDF). Psychology and Aging. 27 (3): 543–549. doi:10.1037/a0023380. PMID 21463058. Wikidata Q50635124.
- Murray, Janice; P Jolicoeur; P A McMullen; M Ingleton (1993). "Orientation-invariant transfer of training in the identification of rotated natural objects". Memory and Cognition. 21 (5): 604–610. doi:10.3758/bf03197192. PMID 8412712. Wikidata Q52033439.
- Anna Campbell; Ted Ruffman; Murray, Janice; Paul Glue (2014). "Oxytocin improves emotion recognition for older males". Neurobiology of Aging. 35 (10): 2246–2248. doi:10.1016/j.neurobiolaging.2014.04.021. PMID 24856057. Wikidata Q47872276.
- Ted Ruffman; Halberstadt, Jamin; Murray, Janice (2009). "Recognition of facial, auditory, and bodily emotions in older adults". Journal of Gerontology Series B: Psychological Sciences and Social Sciences. 64 (6): 696–703. doi:10.1093/geronb/gbp072. PMID 19805486. Wikidata Q50726661.
- Halberstadt, Jamin; Ted Ruffman; Murray, Janice; Mele Taumoepeau; Melissa Ryan (2011). "Emotion perception explains age-related differences in the perception of social gaffes". Psychology and Aging. 26 (1): 133–136. doi:10.1037/a0021366. PMID 21280951. Wikidata Q83329982.
- Murray, Janice (1997). "Flipping and spinning: spatial transformation procedures in the identification of rotated natural objects". Memory and Cognition. 25 (1): 96–105. doi:10.3758/bf03197287. PMID 9046872. Wikidata Q52197572.
