= Janice Pauls =

American politician (1952–2017)

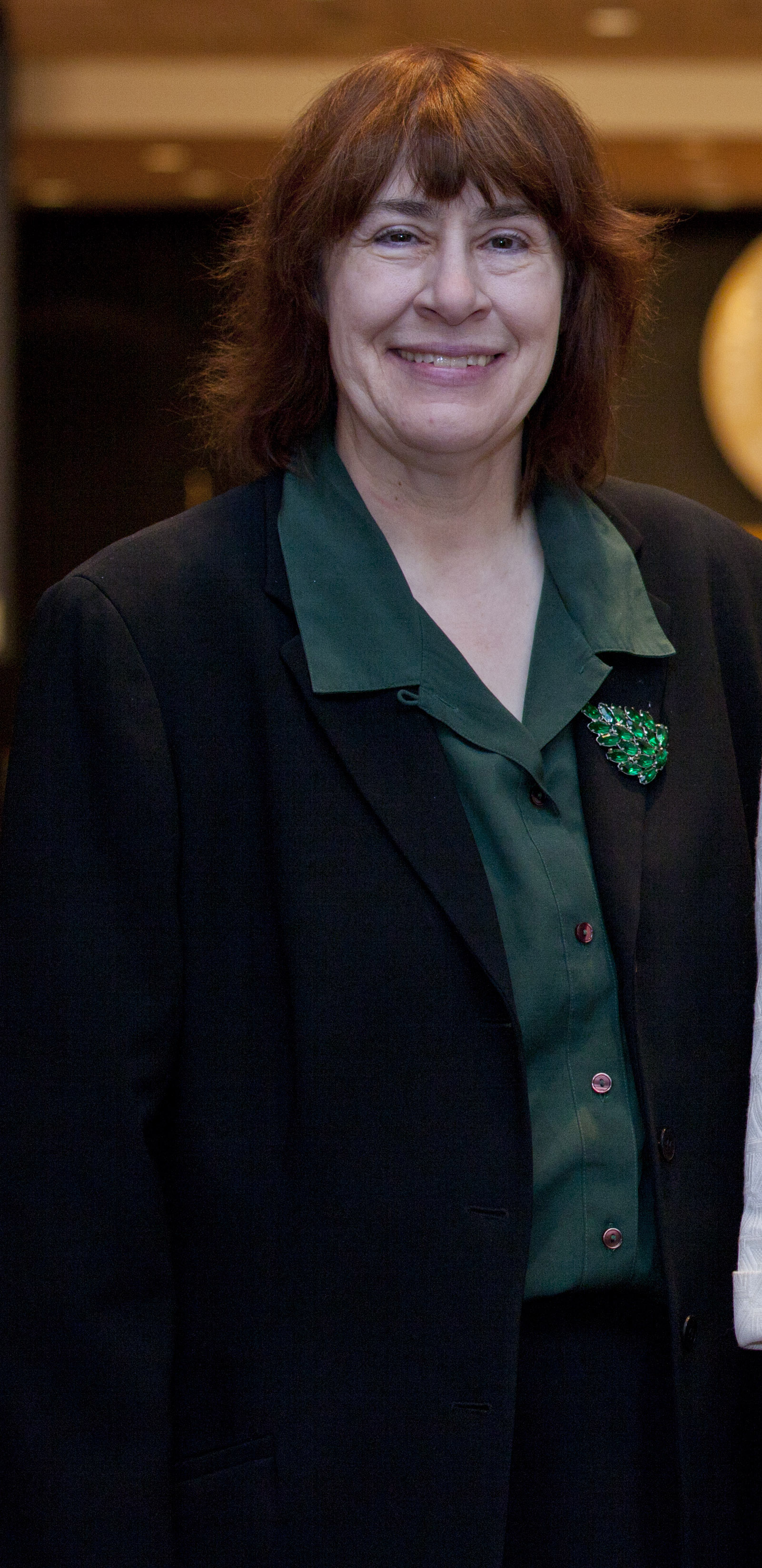
- Pauls in 2012

Member of the Kansas House of Representatives from the 102nd district
- In office 1991 – January 9, 2017
- Preceded by: Donna Whiteman
- Succeeded by: Patsy Terrell

Personal details
- Born: September 26, 1952 Hugoton, Kansas, US
- Died: July 5, 2017 (aged 64) Wichita, Kansas, US
- Party: Republican (2014-2017); Democratic (before 2014)
- Spouse: Ronald K. Pauls

Janice "Jan" Pauls (née Long; September 26, 1952 – July 5, 2017) was a Republican member of the Kansas House of Representatives who represented the 102nd district from 1991 to 2016. She was also a member of the Kansas Sentencing Commission.

== Policies ==
Pauls was known for her social conservatism and played a role in Kansas Amendment 1 against same-sex marriage. The amendment was later ruled to be unconstitutional following Obergefell v. Hodges in 2015. She was also one of the few Democratic politicians endorsed by "Kansans for Life PAC" in 2012.

== Party change ==
Formerly a Democrat, Pauls changed her party affiliation to Republican in May 2014.

== Committee membership ==
- Corrections and Juvenile Justice
- Judiciary (Ranking Member)
- Rules and Journal
- Joint Committee on Administrative Rules and Regulations
- Joint Committee on Corrections and Juvenile Justice Oversight
