= David Yontef =

Reality television personality

- Occupation: Reality television personality

David Yontef is a reality TV personality who was a contestant on the show Millionaire Matchmaker in 2011. He later claimed that the show was faked.

In 2019, Yontef started a podcast called Behind the Velvet Rope, which features celebrity guests.

The podcast became popular when conflict emerged between some of the housewives after comments were made during their interviews.
