= Kyler Sweely =

American politician

Member of the Kansas House of Representatives from the 102nd district
- Incumbent
- Assumed office January 13, 2025
- Preceded by: Jason Probst

Personal details
- Party: Republican
- Profession: Veteran
- Website: kylersweely.com

Kyler Sweely is an American politician from Kansas who currently represents the 102nd district of the Kansas House of Representatives. He is a Republican.

== Biography ==
A U.S. Army veteran twice deployed oversees, Sweely worked as an administrative assistant to Avery Anderson during the 2024 legislative session.

=== 2024 election ===
In 2024, Sweely ran for election to the 102nd district of the Kansas House of Representatives. Sweely narrowly defeated Republican Tyson Thrall in the primary election.

During the campaign, incumbent Jason Probst, a Democrat, highlighted that Sweely wasn't from Reno County and argued that the Republican party was "district shopping" and importing politicians from Topeka to run in competitive districts across the state. Concurrently, several Reno County Republicans objected to Sweely’s candidacy after compiling evidence contesting his declared residence, though such findings were dismissed by state authorities.

Days before the election, a video surfaced of Sweely allegedly jumping into a bed with an unconscious woman. Sweely described the clip as "some old videos from a double date with friends — just us hanging out and being silly" while Probst asserted sexual assault charges should be filed. The Wichita Police Department contacted the woman in the video and she refused to press charges.

In November, Sweely defeated Probst with 3,772 votes (52.03%) to 3,478 votes (47.97%).
