= Martha Ortiz =

Mexican chef and restaurant owner

- Born: Northern Mexico
- Culinary career
- Cooking style: Mexican cuisine
- Current restaurant(s): Dulce Patria; Ella Canta
- Previous restaurant(s): Águila y Sol
- Television show(s): Top Chef Mexico

Martha Ortiz is a Mexican chef and owner of the restaurants Dulce Patria in the Las Alcobas hotel in Mexico City and Ella Canta within the InterContinental London Park Lane in London, England.

== Career ==
Martha Ortiz was raised in Northern Mexico; her father was a doctor, and her mother an artist. Ortiz was inspired to become a chef at an early age, because of the dinner parties that her parents used to throw. However, she studied political science at University. She then travelled to Hong Kong and Paris, France, where she worked in professional kitchens. It was then that she decided that she wanted to learn more about Mexican cuisine, and travelled around her home country learning recipes and techniques. Ortiz has since co-authored cookbooks with her mother, Martha Chapa, on regional Mexican cuisine.

She opened her first restaurant, Águila y Sol, in Mexico City in 2003. Ortiz had a menu there which show flavours and styles from all over the country, such as mole sauce from Oaxaca and machaca from the north of the country.

She was upset when she was forced to close the restaurant in 2008. The local government had decided that the restaurant must be closed as it was a single parking space short of the required number. The following year, she opened Dulce Patria within the boutique hotel Las Alcobas, also within Mexico City. It has since won several awards, and as of 2017, is ranked number 48 in the list of Latin America's 50 Best Restaurants.

In 2017, she opened a second location, within the InterContinental London Park Lane in London, England. To ensure authenticity, the menu will include a number of ingredients imported from Mexico, and produces its own masa to make tortillas from. Her main aim with the restaurant is to educate the British public about Mexican food, as she believes that it is currently muddled with Tex-Mex cuisine in the UK.

=== Television ===
Ortiz is a judge on the television cooking competition Top Chef Mexico.

== Family life ==
Between 2008 and 2014, she was married to Sergio Vela.
