= Patsy Terrell =

American politician (1961–2017)

Patsy Ann Terrell

Member of the Kansas House of Representatives from the 102nd district
- In office January 9, 2017 – June 7, 2017
- Preceded by: Janice Pauls
- Succeeded by: Jason Probst

Personal details
- Born: December 23, 1961 Paducah, Kentucky, U.S.
- Died: June 7, 2017 (aged 55) Topeka, Kansas, U.S.
- Party: Democratic
- Education: University of Kentucky
- Profession: writer, communications

Patsy Ann Terrell (December 23, 1961 – June 7, 2017) was an American politician. A Democrat, Terrell represented the 102nd district in the Kansas House of Representatives from January 9, 2017, until her death in office on June 7, 2017. She was 55 years old when she died.

Terrell was a native of Paducah, Kentucky, and a self-employed writer who also worked in communications. She received her bachelor's degree in communications from the University of Kentucky. She lived in Hutchinson, Kansas.
