= Janice B. Walker =

American mathematician

Janice Anita Brown Walker
- Born: Meridian, Mississippi
- Education: Tuskegee University; University of Michigan - Ann Arbor
- Occupations: Mathematician, professor, administrator
- Years active: 1982-2022

Janice B. Walker is an American mathematician who taught and served as an administrator at Xavier University in Cincinnati and Assistant to the President and Chief Diversity and Inclusion Officer there.

== Biography ==
Janice Anita Brown Walker was born in Meridian, Mississippi, and raised in Florida. She earned her BS in mathematics at Tuskegee University and her MA and Ph.D. in mathematics at the University of Michigan - Ann Arbor (1982). The title of her dissertation was Closure and Expansions in Series of Complex Exponentials and her advisor was Douglas Grassel Dickson.

Before earning her Ph.D., Walker held several University of Michigan positions in Ann Arbor. In 1982, Walker moved to Cincinnati, Ohio to become an assistant professor at Xavier University. In 1986, she was named associate professor, and beginning in 1992, she served as chair of the Mathematics and Computer Science department for seven years. In 1999, she became dean of the College of Arts and Sciences and served for 17 years.

Walker was Xavier's vice president for Institutional Diversity and Inclusion for five years after which she rejoined the mathematics department before retiring from the university.

In 2019, Walker contributed to Xavier's purchase of ten works of art for an exhibit titled, “Art at the X: Celebrating Women,” which was staged along with the university's 50th anniversary of the admission of women as traditional day students. The ten pieces were later added to the university's permanent art collection.

Walker retired from Xavier in 2022. She serves as a board member of Breakthrough Cincinnati and other community organizations.

== Publications ==
- Walker, Janice B. "A note on neighborhoods of analytic functions having positive real part." International Journal of Mathematics and Mathematical Sciences 13 (1990): 425-429.
- Walker, Janice Anita Brown. Closure and Expansions in Series of Complex Exponentials. University of Michigan, 1982.
