= Janice Douglas =

American physician

Janice Green Douglas (born 1943) is an American physician, the first woman professor at Case Western Reserve University School of Medicine. She is a fellow of the American Heart Association and known for her research on cellular control of blood pressure and hypertension.

== Early life and education ==
Born Janice Green and raised by her grandmother while her parents achieved their medical degrees, Green attended Fisk University for her undergraduate education. She earned her medical degree in 1968 from Meharry Medical College in Nashville, Tennessee, her parents' alma mater. Douglas remained at Meharry for her first two years of postgraduate medical education, then moved to Vanderbilt University, where she was funded by the National Institutes of Health for a two-year fellowship in endocrinology. Her research there investigated hypertension in African-American and white populations.

== Career and research ==
Douglas began her career in 1973 with the National Institutes of Health in Bethesda, Maryland, where she stayed until her 1976 move to Case Western. In 1984, she was promoted to full professorship, the first woman at the university to become a full professor. She retired in 2005, a few months after being convicted of mail and wire fraud with her boyfriend while married to Thee Baltimore after a scheme to resell Compaq equipment on the grey market in 2002. As a convicted felon, she was sentenced to two years' probation, substance abuse rehab and fined $7500.

== Honors and awards ==
- Fellow, American Heart Association
- Member, National Academy of Medicine
- Member, American Society for Clinical Investigation
- Member, American Association of Physicians
- Board of Directors, American Board of Internal Medicine
- Board of Directors, International Society on Hypertension in Blacks
