= Janice Tanton =

Canadian artist

Janice Tanton is a Canadian artist.

== Background ==
Tanton was born on October 25, 1961, in Oshawa, Ontario, and is the daughter of George and Jacqueline Tanton. Her birth parents were Doug Hunter and Louise Brown, both deceased, of Toronto. After graduating from R.S. McLaughlin C.V.I., she attended the BFA (Acting) program at the University of Windsor for two years and continued her post-secondary education, graduating from the Graphic Design Program at Durham College. Tanton continued her interest in the arts, working professionally in theatre, graphic design, and sales, and launched an art publishing and design company in 1989.

She sold her original and published artwork in Canada and the United States, while operating two commercial galleries in Burford and Stratford, Ontario. She was a delegate to the first 1999 Businesswomen's Summit between Canada and the U.S. She has held membership in the Society of Tempera Painters, Organization of Women in International Trade (OWIT), and WEC (Women Entrepreneurs of Canada) and has participated on Team Canada Trade and Export missions.

From 1996 to 2006, she was the creative director and illustrator of Country Home Candle. She illustrated the series, "Some Beary Nice Places" and "Christmas Memories" of plates for the Bradford Exchange. In 2010, Tanton, along with Chrissy Nickerson, Landon Giauque, Pascale Ouellet (Bigoudi), Susan Padula, were a part of the Corridor Collective Studio and Gallery founded by Cheryl Baxter and Chris Beck.

== Art ==
Tanton mentors and instructs a number of Canadian artists and youth community arts programs, and maintains a studio practice in Canmore, Alberta.

She works primarily in oils.

== Awards and honours ==
Moving to Canmore, Alberta with her family in February 2005, Tanton became the Program Manager for Indigenous Leadership and Management in Leadership Development at The Banff Centre for Arts and Creativity. In April 2008, and Elder Tom Crane Bear of Siksika First Nation (Blackfoot) designed the tipi to mark the 75th Anniversary of The Banff Centre a few weeks ahead of the apology by the Canadian government to Aboriginal people. The design was transferred to her and Brian Calliou (Program Director for Aboriginal Leadership) and their families in a ceremony conducted by Blackfoot Elders Bruce and Anne-Marie Wolfchild, and witnessed and attended by Governor General Michaëlle Jean and her husband Jean-Daniel Lafond. Tanton and her family were adopted by Elder Tom Crane Bear and she was given the Blackfoot name, "Iniskimaki" (Buffalo Stone Woman).

In 2008, she was named an Alumnus of Distinction by Durham College. In 2009, she received a Canada Council for the Arts individual visual arts project grant to produce The Community Fusion Project.
