= Janice Cowan =

Canadian writer

Janice Cowan (born in Hampshire, England) is a writer based in Victoria, British Columbia, Canada. She was previously a spy for the Canadian government during a diplomatic posting in the Soviet Union prior to its dissolution.

== Bibliography ==
- 2006: A Spy's Wife. Lorimer ISBN 1-55028-931-4
- 1991: Black Forest Secret, Borealis ISBN 0-88887-106-6
- 1987: Mystery on the Miramichi, Borealis ISBN 0-88887-906-7
- 1983: Secret of Ivy Lea, Borealis ISBN 0-88887-055-8
- 1981: Mystery of Castle Hotel, Borealis ISBN 0-919594-56-5
- 1977: Maple Island Mystery, Borealis ISBN 0-919594-59-X
