= Janice Urnstein Weissman =

American figurative painter (born 1944)

Janice Urnstein Weissman (born 1944, St. Louis, Missouri) is an American figurative painter. Weissman started her artistic career as a classical painter utilizing Impressionistic techniques. She has evolved since the 1960s into a style of Realism. For the past eleven years, she has been exploring tattoo sub-cultures for the purpose of documenting the phenomenon she refers to as “Living Canvases."

== Early life and education ==
Weissman grew up in St. Louis, Missouri after World War II. Her education was directed toward the achievement of a BFA Degree from the Kansas City Art Institute and an MFA degree from the University of Cincinnati. She was selected from her undergraduate class to receive a scholarship to the Skowhegan School of Painting and Sculpture and the University of Cincinnati graduate program.

== Living canvases ==
After creating paintings of doll parts and working in body wrapping, a technique that involves creating molds of the subjects and mummifying them, Weissman began focusing on tattoos. She documented tattoo culture in her paintings, “The Tattoo Series,” which is a collection of highly detailed depictions of people with intricate tattoos. As the collection progressed, her work has transformed from tight, closely cropped torsos, to full bodies and models posed with ornamental kimono or juxtaposed with earthly elements.

Weissman chooses models that have a theme on their body, she is interested in body art that is not purely aesthetic, tattoos that have a goal or a meaning. It is important to Weissman that the tattoo is not just a piece here or there, she likes tattoos that have something to say. It’s not usually difficult for Weissman to find models; mostly her subjects consist of mostly people she meets at body art conventions and in similar environments. While usually reluctant at first, after viewing some of previous works, subjects are convinced they will not be commercialized and agree to model for her. In addition, some subjects have contacted her about having her paint their tattoos.

She starts her painting process by taking photos of her models and their tattoos alongside her photographers Jack Anderson and Shaun Alexander, the renowned fashion photographer. After a photo session, Weissman projects the photo onto her canvas and begins drawing the figure and all its details. She color codes each change in color, making the canvas look a little like the world's most complex color-by-numbers diagram. Then, section by section, she paints and glazes her work. Start to finish, one of her paintings takes about six months to complete.

== Style ==
Weissman’s style can be described as detail-oriented. It is important to her to fully include the intricate aesthetics of each pattern and to represent the jewel-like quality of the color, noticing subtle differences in hue and brightness. She considers herself a colorist; like Vermeer and Chardin, whose art exemplifies chiaroscuro, the light and dark enveloping the figures, and the fleshy, beautiful skin tones of Rubens. Besides the tattoos, the human form is likewise important. Since the tattoos are lying on the body, the three-dimensional form of the figure is very important in Weissman’s work. Additionally, she gives particular attention to how the light envelopes her figures.

== Exhibitions and collections ==
Ms. Weissman has mounted solo exhibitions with Estelle Malka, Los Angeles, CA; Galerie Furstenberg, Paris, France; and Riverdale Art Museum, Riverside, CA among others. Her work is held in the permanent collections of the Arnot Art Museum, Elmira, NY; Museum of the American West, Los Angeles, CA; Hallmark Crown Center, Kansas City, MO; as well as Habimah Theatre Tel Aviv, Israel. Critical attention to her work has been received by PBS, American Art Collector, ArtNews, Art in America, ArtWeek, and Los Angeles Magazine.
