= Janis Scott =

American activist

Janis Scott (1951–2024), also known as the "Bus Lady" of Houston, was an arts patron and transportation advocate.

== Biography ==
Scott grew up in Houston's East End near the Port of Houston as the daughter of a domestic worker, where she and her mother relied on the bus for transportation. She attended Fidelity Manor High School in the Galena Park Independent School District until her senior year when she was a part of the first class bused to an all-white school in 1969 during the district's desegregation. In 1970 Scott won a scholarship to attend Rice University. Janis Scott was one of the first Black students to graduate from Rice University in 1974.

Scott worked at Marathon Oil for nearly thirty years until she retired in 2003. As a retiree, she was a frequent attendee at academic and cultural events, as well as public meetings.

== Advocacy ==
A lifelong user of public transportation to navigate the city, Scott was known by many as the "Bus Lady" for her advocacy to and for Houston Metro. She would encourage others to ride the bus, report broken ticket machines, and advocate for increased accessibility for neighborhoods underserved by public buses. Improvements with issues such as lighting, shelter, service reliability, and trash cleanup were important elements of the transit equity she sought for all Houstonians, including elders and people with mobility challenges. She served as a founding board member for the transportation advocacy group LINK Houston.

== Recognition ==
Scott received the Outstanding Achievement in Civic and Community Service award in 2016 from the Association of Rice University Black Alumni. In 2004 she was interviewed for the Voices of Civil Rights project at the Library of Congress about her experiences as a student during desegregation. The Ensemble Theatre awarded her the Individual Partner Award in 2001 for attending the most plays. She was a community associate at Jones College at Rice University and frequently attended events on campus while encouraging the students to explore the broader city.
