= Janice Prishwalko =

American model

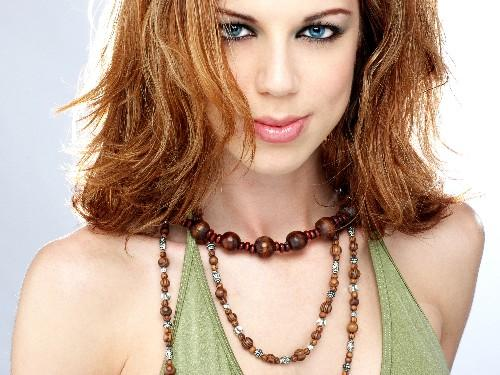
- Born: 1981 (age 44–45); Clinton, Connecticut, United States
- Modeling information
- Height: 5 ft 10 in (178 cm)
- Hair color: brown (natural)
- Eye color: blue
- Website: www.janiceprishwalko.com

Janice Prishwalko is a fashion model and television hostess based in New York City.

== Background ==
Prishwalko was born in Clinton, Connecticut and obtained her BA at Boston University. She currently resides in New York City.

== Modeling ==
Prishwalko has appeared in numerous print spreads for such magazines as GQ, Glamour, and SELF, and has done catalog and runway work as well.

== Television ==
Prishwalko is known primarily as the hostess of the video magazine Chic TV, on which she covers the fashion industry. She has also done hosting for FUJI TV's program Oh My, NY, which airs on Japanese television.

Acting work to date includes commercial work, and bit parts in such programs as Sex and the City and What Not to Wear.
