= Jānis Liepiņš =

Jānis Liepiņš may refer to:

- Jānis Liepiņš (painter) (1894–1964), Latvian painter
- Jānis Liepiņš (conductor) (born 1988), Latvian conductor
