= Jānis Bērziņš =

Jānis Bērziņš is a Latvian given name (Jānis) and surname (Bērziņš) which may refer to:

- Jānis Bērziņš (politician) (Russian: Ян Берзин, 1889–1938), Soviet military official and politician
- Jānis Bērziņš (diplomat) (1881–1938), Soviet diplomat
- Jānis Bērziņš (basketball) (born 1993), Latvian basketball player
- Jānis Bērziņš (biathlete) (born 1984), Latvian Olympic biathlete
