= Janice Marturano =

American businessperson (born 1957)

Janice Marturano (born 1957) is an author, former vice president at General Mills, and founder and executive director of the Institute for Mindful Leadership, a non-profit organization that educates business and organizational employees on strengthening the fundamentals of leadership excellence through mindfulness meditation, contemplative leadership practices and their practical applications in the workplace.

== Early life ==
Marturano grew up in Clifton, New Jersey, the child of first generation Italian immigrant parents. She graduated with a Juris Doctor (JD) from NYU School of Law in 1982. She worked as a business lawyer at Curtis, Mallet-Prevost, Colt & Mosle and then as in-house counsel for Panasonic and Nabisco.

== General Mills ==
Marturano joined General Mills in 1996, and became Deputy General Counsel and Vice President, Public Responsibility. She had a leading role in the complex eighteen-month business deal that occurred when General Mills acquired the Pillsbury Company in 2001; the timing of which coincided with the death of both her parents. Looking for a way to regain her strength and health, she enrolled in a mindfulness workshop taught by Jon Kabat-Zinn, the MIT PhD who created the Mindfulness based stress reduction (MBSR) framework.

With a goal of sharing her own experience, Marturano developed Mindful Leadership training for her colleagues at General Mills. While still a corporate officer at General Mills, she received her mindfulness teacher certification from the University of Massachusetts Medical School's Center for Mindfulness and went on to co-develop the first mindful leadership curricula at the University of Massachusetts Medical School's Center for Mindfulness where she later served as a member of the advisory board. In 2008, this Mindful Leadership training was opened to leaders from other organizations.

== Mindful Leadership ==
In order to teach Mindful Leadership full-time, Marturano left General Mills in 2010 and founded the Institute for Mindful Leadership. Combining mindfulness with her experience as a former officer of a Fortune 200 company, she developed curricula to bring training in mindful leadership to leaders from corporate, non-profit, academic, government, and military organizations. She heads a team of instructors experienced in mindfulness training and with a variety of organizational leadership backgrounds; they collaborate to tailor curricula to suit individual clients, as well as offering programs to the general public.

In 2013, she was invited to the World Economic Forum in Davos, Switzerland to share her understanding of the importance of mindful leadership. She spoke again at the 2014 World Economic Forum Conference in Tianjin, China and has been a featured speaker at the Wisdom 2.0 Business Conference in NY, Global Mindful Leadership Conference in Australia, and Mindful Leadership Forum in Washington, DC.

Marturano's writings and work have been featured on BBC News, and in The New York Times, The Financial Times, Time magazine, and the Los Angeles Times.

In March 2016, Arianna Huffington selected Janice Marturano as a Huffington Post Pioneer, a HuffPost Originals video series that profiles leaders in various industries.

== Finding the Space to Lead: A Practical Guide to Mindful Leadership ==
Janice Marturano's first book, Finding the Space to Lead: A Practical Guide to Mindful Leadership (Bloomsbury Press, 2014), won a 2014 Silver Nautilus Book Award in the category of Business/Leadership and has been translated into many languages. Finding the Space to Lead is required reading for several university programs including the University of Southern California Marshall School of Business and New York University Stern School of Business' Mindfulness in Business Initiative.
