= Janice Jordan Shefelman =

American writer (born 1930)

- Born: 1930 (age 95–96); Dallas, Texas, U.S.
- Occupations: Writer, novelist
- Spouse: Tom Shefelman
- Writing career
- Language: English
- Genres: Fiction, children's fiction
- Notable works: I, Vivaldi
- Notable awards: New York Public Library Best Book for the Teen Age, Children's Book Council Notable Book, Reading Rainbow Book, International Reading Association Children's Choices.
- Website: shefelmanbooks.com

Janice Jordan Shefelman (born 1930) is an American writer, best known for her children's book I, Vivaldi, based upon the life of Antonio Vivaldi and illustrated by her husband, Tom Shefelman.

Shefelman grew up in Dallas, Texas near the Southern Methodist University, where her father taught German classes. She claims her passion for books started when her father read to her when she was young. She had a career as a librarian, teacher, and her current profession, a writer. During an interview with the Society of Children's Book Writers and Illustrators, she states they wrote and illustrated their first story when they were five years old. After attending college at Southern Methodist University, she spent an entire summer bicycling around Europe and another traveling through North America, and the Middle East. When she married Tom, her current husband and illustrator, they went on a trip around the world, living in a buddhist Temple for a while. During her voyage, she wrote articles for newspapers and magazines, for which her partner Illustrated. They then returned a year later and bought a home in Austin Texas. Her career kicked off when her first published book, A Paradise Called Texas, appeared on the Texas Bluebonnet Award Master List. She has two sons, Karl, and Dan, who illustrated some of her books. She currently devotes her full time to writing.

== Reception ==
Critical reception for Shefelman's work has been predominantly positive, with Kirkus Reviews calling I, Vivaldi "fetching".

== Bibliography ==
- A Paradise Called Texas (1983)
- Willow Creek Home (1985)
- Spirit of Iron (1987)
- Victoria House (1988)
- A Mare for Young Wolf (1993)
- Young Wolf's First Hunt (1995)
- Young Wolf and Spirit Horse (1997)
- A Peddler's Dream (1999)
- Comanche Song (2000)
- Son of Spirit Horse (2004)
- Sophie's War (2006)
- I, Vivaldi (2008)
- Anna Maria's Gift (2010)
- Honeymoon Hobos (2011)

== See also ==
- https://shefelmanbooks.com/aboutus.htm. Shefelman's official webpage.
