= Janice Murray (speech therapist) =

Prof. Janice Murray FRCSLT
- Occupation: Speech Therapist

Janice Murray FRCSLT is a Speech Therapist and Professor at Manchester Metropolitan University, specialising in Augmentative and Alternative Communication.

From 2009 to 20102 Murray was the Chair of the UK charity Communication Matters. Since 2012 Murray has been on the Research Committee for the International Society for Augmentative and Alternative Communication and is the Chair-elect of Council for the International Society for Augmentative and Alternative Communication.

Murray was elected a Fellow of the Royal College of Speech and Language Therapists in 2016.

== Select publications ==
- Murray, J., Sandberg, AD., Smith, MM., Deliberato, D., Stadskleiv, K. et al. 2018. 'Communicating the unknown: descriptions of pictured scenes and events presented on video by children and adolescents using aided communication and their peers using natural speech'. Augmentative and Alternative Communication. 34(1), 30–39.
- Bozic, N., Lawthom, R., and Murray, J. 2017. 'Exploring the context of strengths – a new approach to strength-based assessment'. Educational Psychology in Practice. 34(1), 26–40.
- Smith, M. and Murray, J. 2016. The Silent Partner? Language, Interaction and Aided Communication.
- Hemsley, B. and Murray, J. 2015. 'Distance and proximity: research on social media connections in the field of communication disability'. Disability Rehabilitation. 37(17), 1509–1510.
