= Janice LaMarre =

- Genres: Classical
- Occupation: Violist
- Instrument: Viola

Janice LaMarre is a Canadian concert violist.

== Life ==
Originally from Barrie, Ontario, Canada, LaMarre first studied violin and viola at the Young Artists' Performance Academy at the Royal Conservatory of Music, in Toronto. She won top prizes from the Kiwanis Music Festival throughout childhood, and attained diplomas in Viola, Violin, Music Theory, and Music History during her teenage years, through study with faculty of the University of Toronto. LaMarre went on to earn a Bachelors and Masters of Music at The Juilliard School in New York, studying with the violist of the Brentano String Quartet, Misha Amory, and pedagogue Heidi Castleman. LaMarre completed Doctoral coursework at the Manhattan School of Music with Guarneri Quartet member Michael Tree and violist Karen Dreyfus, and earned an Artist Diploma at Yale University. She currently resides in New York, concertizing primarily in Canada and the United States. Her musical mentors include Austrian violist Thomas Riebl and French pianist Philippe Entremont.

== Career ==
LaMarre launched her career by winning the top award given by the Canada Council to Individual Musicians, while still a Masters student at The Juilliard School. LaMarre was next awarded the prestigious $60,000 George McDonald Award for outstanding artistry and scholarship, while a doctoral student at the Manhattan School of Music. She performed her Carnegie Hall debut recital in Weill Hall in 2013, and recorded her debut album of Beethoven and Schubert at that time. LaMarre is invited to perform viola concertos regularly, with orchestras in Canada and the United States, and to give recitals in North America and Europe, including at Chateau Fontainebleau and the Université de Nice. LaMarre was invited by the Fontainebleau Schools to perform chamber music with the principal players of the Netherlands Chamber Orchestra, while serving as principal viola in the orchestra. She won a place in the New Haven Symphony Orchestra, and Assistant Principal Viola of the Greater Bridgeport Symphony Orchestra, and was invited to be principal viola in Les Concerts du Cloître. LaMarre was broadcast on New York's WQXR-FM, and appeared briefly as first violinist in the film The Longest Week starring Olivia Wilde and Jason Bates, and as Canadian poet Gwendolyn MacEwen in a CBC Television documentary.

In academia, LaMarre has won teaching fellow positions at Yale University, The Manhattan School of Music, and The Juilliard School. She has published articles in the Journal of the American Viola Society and the Suzuki Association of the Americas. As a teaching artist, LaMarre was awarded grants for her concert-lesson plans from Young Audiences, performing them to auditoriums of school children and teachers throughout Connecticut. She developed year-long curriculum for New York City Public Schools as a Morse Fellow. She is the founder and director of Midsummer Sound, where she teaches and performs on violin and viola each summer. LaMarre is often invited to teach masterclasses as a guest artist during trips for solo recitals.

Her first solo CD of Beethoven and Schubert, recorded by Oktaven Audio, was released in spring of 2013.
