= Kansas Sentencing Commission =

Administrative agency of Kansas state government

The Kansas Sentencing Commission is an administrative agency that is part of the executive branch of Kansas state government. The purpose of the Kansas Sentencing Commission is to maintain an effective, fair, and efficient sentencing system for the state of Kansas.

== Mission and Philosophy ==
The agency's stated guiding philosophy is that the imposition of incarceration should be used in only the most serious offenders.

== History ==
The Kansas Sentencing Commission was established in 1989 as a result of the passage of Senate Bill 50 that same year. The enabling legislation, "The Kansas Sentencing Guidelines Act" is set forth in K.S.A. 21-4701 et seq. The Commission's offices are located in Topeka, Kansas.
