= Janis Birkeland =

American architect and planner

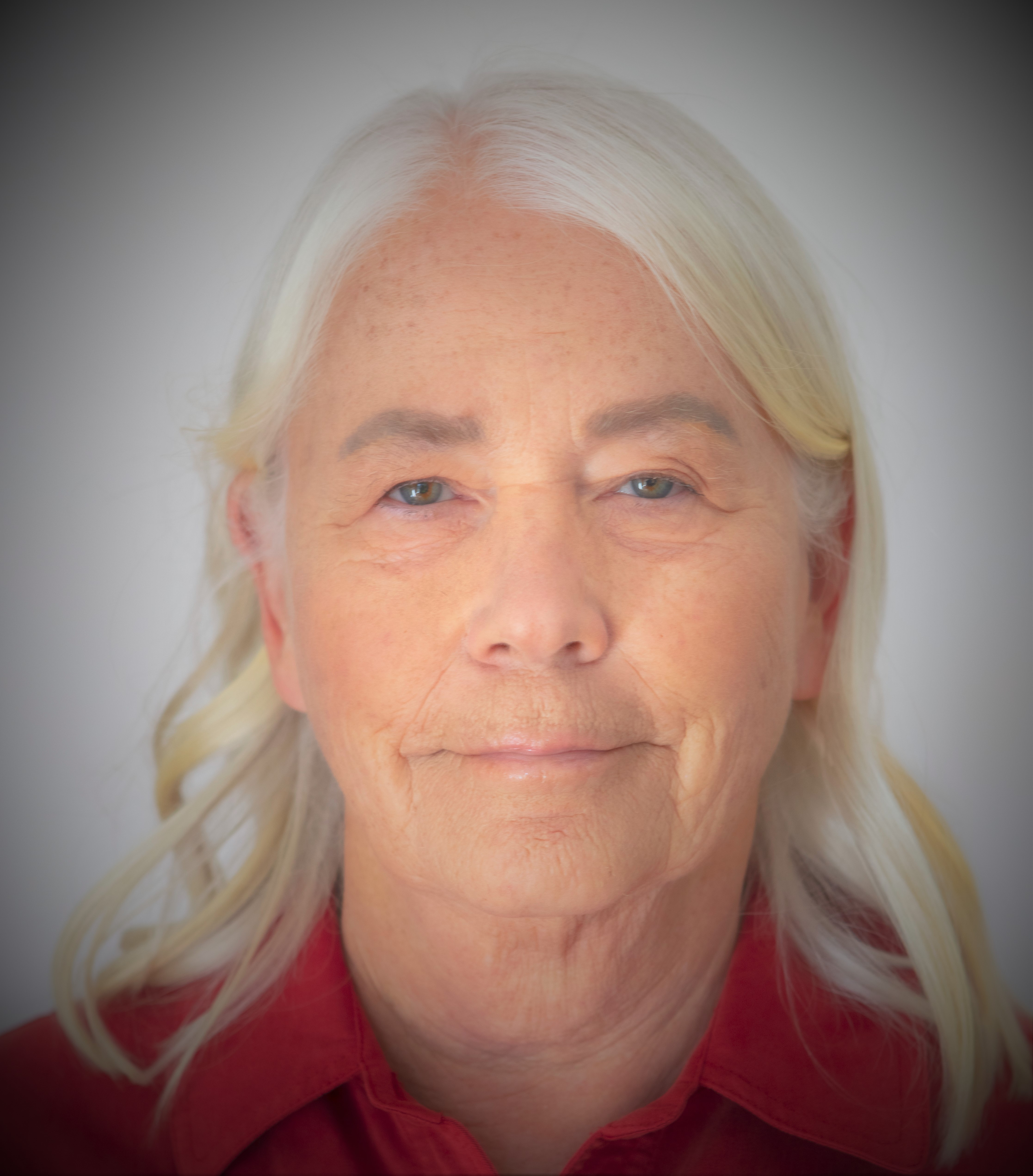
- Janis BIrkeland 2022
- Born: August 21, 1945 (age 81); Hutchinson Kansas, USA
- Education: Bennington College (B.Art, 1966); UC Berkeley (M.Arch, 1972); UC Law SF (JD Law, 1979); U of Tasmania (PhD, 1993)
- Occupations: Professor, theorist, environmentalist
- Known for: Net-Positive Design practice; Positive Development Theory
- Notable work: The STARfish design app http://netpositivedesign.org

Janis Birkeland is an authority on, and friendly critic of, contemporary 'sustainable' architecture, planning, management, and design. She began her career as a sustainable architect, city planner and lawyer in San Francisco. After relocating to Australia in 1981, she undertook a PhD on planning for sustainability. From 1992, she developed and taught sustainable development and design courses at five universities. In over 150 publications, she challenged the latest thinking in sustainability, including three textbooks: Design for Sustainability (2002), Positive Development (2008), and Net-Positive Design (2020). According to her, progressive sustainable design and development paradigms used weak goals, standards, indicators, processes, strategies, and tools. Exemplar green buildings even fail to even offset their own additional damage.

Birkeland's contributions redefined the boundaries of sustainability. Her original premise was that, paradoxically, genuine sustainability could be achieved through urban development. However, this would require the built environment to be totally re-conceived. Her 'Positive Development' theory explains the incapacity of current intellectual and physical constructs to achieve genuine (whole-system) sustainability, and how they could be reconstructed to do so. Her 'net-positive design' paradigm aimed to reverse planetary overshoot, climate change, biodiversity losses, etc., and to return global and per capita levels of consumption and pollution well below planetary limits.^{[23]} Among other things, this requires increasing nature relative to pre-urban conditions. She always stressed that eco-positive retrofitting (remodelling) of cities and buildings was a priority due to for example, the material flows in both ordinary and green construction. Birkeland's contributions are gradually being incorporated into sustainable design paradigms.

In a nutshell, Positive Development theory and practice prodded regenerative design to go further: to increase the 'public estate' (environmental security, universal access to the means of survival, etc.) and to increase the 'ecological base' (ecosystem functions and services, biodiversity, etc.) in order to reverse overshoot and create positive interrelationships. The logic underlying Positive Development theory led to unique proposals for sustainable forms of governance, decision-making frameworks, planning methods, architecture, design practices, participation processes, and assessment tools. Net-positive design also inspired novel design concepts such as Green Scaffolding, and building-integrated 'eco-services' for people, structures and nature. Birkeland devised a new design and assessment method, called 'STARfish' to enable design for net-positive outcomes. It is the antithesis of other sustainability assessment tools and corrects three dozen of their common defects.

== Education ==
Dr. Birkeland's first degree was from Bennington College, Vermont (B Arts, 1966), and she initially worked as an artist and art teacher. While studying architecture at Berkeley, California (MA, 1972) she began working as an advocacy planner in under-served communities in San Francisco. This experience led her to decision to better understand the structural impediments to socio-ecological sustainability. Therefore, in 1974, she became an Urban Designer and later a City Planner with the San Francisco City Planning Department. She also continued to do architectural projects and became a registered architect in 1977. Concurrently, she obtained a Juris Doctor degree at UC California College of the Law (1979), was admitted to the California Bar (1980), and worked in the City Attorney's office on City Planning.

When BIrkeland moved to Australia for family reasons, her professional qualifications were not recognized by the Queen's dominions. She therefore applied her transdisciplinary background to a PhD in Planning for a Sustainable Society (1993) at the University of Tasmania. This research deconstructed and redesigned a system of eco-governance that could make nature and ethics integral to decision-making frameworks and processes. Since then, she continued to refine the new "mindsets, models, methods, and metrics" that, in her view, are necessary to transform the built environment into a generator of net (whole-system) sustainability.

== Teaching ==
Birkeland's teaching and research career focused on sustainable planning and design. She began teaching at the University of Tasmania (1992–1994), she then at the University of Canberra (1994–2004). Throughout the 1990s, she taught what are now called the regenerative design and circular systems paradigms. Her teaching materials were later published later as Design for Sustainability (2002). She also organized conferences, seminars and professional development courses to raise public awareness about proactive, positive solutions to diverse sustainability challenges. In 2001, she took a year off from teaching to serve as the Senior Environmental Education Officer for the Australian federal government. These combined educational, professional, academic and government perspectives prompted her critical reassessment of leading-edge sustainable design and development standards and strategies.

Upon returning to the University of Canberra in 2002, she began to challenge the regenerative design and circular systems models that were, by then, gaining wider acceptance. Birkeland identified what she deemed to be fundamental flaws in these 'weak' sustainability frameworks. These included their failure to address planetary overshoot and its many repercussions, such as climate change, biodiversity losses, social disparities, environmental risks, etc. From 2002 onwards, she formulated Positive Development theory to address these crucial sustainability issues, along with net-positive design principles and processes and, later on, the STARfish net-positive design app.

To find time to advance these concepts, Birkeland took a Visiting Fellow position at the Australian National University (2004–2007). She then assumed full professorship roles at the Queensland University of Technology and the University of Auckland in 2007 and 2011, respectively. In 2016, she joined the University of Melbourne as an honorary professor, where she continues to advance the frontiers of the sustainable design disciplines in more positive directions. The current number of publications in the sustainable building industries, professions and academia that mention net-positive design and development - albeit in diluted forms - indicate a growing acceptance of the need to redesign the systems and concepts that shape the built environment.

== Philosophical stance ==
In the 1980s, Birkeland applied an Ecofeminist lens to deconstruct the 'Dominant Paradigm': a world view that reified a value system described as industrial, androcentric, mechanistic, reductionist, anthropocentric, power-based, etc. She exposed vestiges of that anachronistic worldview that still permeate contemporary sustainable development decision-making systems and design practices. Ecofeminism was chosen because it addresses human-nature relationships but also explores the systemic roots of exploitative interrelationships at personal and political levels. Power-based decision structures and development models evolved, inadvertently, from this dualistic conceptual framework. Today, these social, structural and institutional constructs still close off future options. Positive Development (PD) aims to invert the Dominant Paradigm (DP) and expand future sustainable options.

Birkeland taught that the built environment had the latent but unique potential to address nearly all sustainability challenges, except perhaps warfare. However, current forms of development control, strategic planning, urban design and so on, are not fit for purpose. For instance, as she often said, 'objective' (reductionist) sustainability assessment methods "measure all the wrong things in all the wrong ways", while 'subjective' design review processes use vague incrementalist standards, such as "better than before" or "more good than bad". Her proposed standards, processes and metrics for evaluating 'net' sustainability outcomes differ radically from contemporary tools. STARfish shows how to assess crucial issues that are omitted by virtually all building rating schemes, such as the need to increase equity, environmental security and justice, democracy, ecological space, nature, etc. - beyond project and supply chain boundaries.

To safeguard democracy as well as planetary health, Birkeland reasoned that institutional structures must be remodelled to prevent corruption and abusive power relationships, as intended by the US Constitution, and to increase social and natural life-support systems in absolute terms. She taught that 'sustainability is a design problem', whereas the dualistic Dominant Paradigm elevates decision making or 'making choices' over design or 'creating' structures that fix things. The dominant decision-based processes in the economic, technological, executive, or political spheres are suited for contrasting known options. Thus, they limit the ability to envision and implement new sustainable solutions. Birkeland's proposed reforms are design-based and turn current frameworks on their heads.

== Points of contention ==
In lectures and publications, Birkeland challenged what she considered anachronistic ideas in contemporary sustainable or regenerative design theory, practice and strategy. She taught that critique, substantive debate and design thinking are prerequisites to systems change, as subconscious theories cause blind spots. To invite debate, she made her contact details publicly available. Some of her general positions of a critical or contestable nature are summarized here:

- Regenerative design generally calls for development that stays within planetary boundaries - when those limits have been breached. This ignores accelerating nature destruction, social disparities, consumption, pollution, or overshoot. For instance, regenerative buildings have only aimed to restore nature relative to 'pre-construction' conditions (versus pre-development). Nature's surplus should be increased beyond its pre-urban state.
- Circular systems generally only close loops in linear systems which is 'recycling' - not a new paradigm. While absolutely essential, recycling cannot achieve net-positive outcomes due to the laws of physics. Reliance on circularity can lock in suboptimal solutions and delay the redesign of products, buildings and systems to design waste out entirely. Design (open systems thinking) create net-positive outcomes through multifunctional and adaptable structures and systems.
- Donut models depict traditional 'closed-system thinking' and use system boundaries. Like regenerative design and circular systems thinking, it suggests staying within planetary boundaries is enough. This ignores the cumulative pressures and impacts of growth overall. To even achieve impact neutrality, development must over-compensate for its share of overall impacts as well as its own impacts.
- Nature positive usually means just repairing the environmental damage caused during production. To be 'positive' (versus less negative) requires increasing nature relative to pre-industrial conditions. Restoring nature to past depleted conditions cannot meet current demands. In Positive Development, buildings cannot be 'nature positive' unless they leave nature in a better state than if nothing had been built in the region.
- Resilience and robustness are associated with engineering strength and are usually framed as defensive concepts. Durable structures can seldom adapt to changing conditions easily. Democracy requires environmental security and direct access to the means of survival, such as clean air, food, water, shelter. This requires (multifunctional, adaptable) net-positive design that enables future retrofitting to meet unexpected challenges.
- Net-zero targets only, at best, maintain the status quo. This is a negative state in the context of diminishing social and natural life-support systems, especially since net-positive design outcomes are now possible. Moreover, net zero usually deemed achieved by ignoring many crucial impacts and by counting impact 'reduction' (via offsetting or efficiencies) as 'positive' gains. However, negative impacts bioaccumulate.
- Rating tools greenwash development by omitting crucial issues and concealing negative outcomes. They use closed-system accounting methods to avoid dealing with complexity or total cumulative impacts and material stocks and flows. Their benchmarks and metrics are relative to current green building standards, site conditions, construction norms, etc. - not genuine sustainability standards.
- Social change, or the focus on changing the values and behaviors of others, has been overemphasized by sustainable design advocates. Reliance on indirect levers of change and nudging the populace through 'politics, policies, and participation', ignore the power dynamics that tend to corrupt democratic systems. More designers could apply their special skills to developing systems redesign proposals to raise the level of public debate.
- Business-led sustainability schemes and innovations often disempower communities if not, in effect, transfer wealth vertically. Instead of preaching to the converted, design-led on-ground actions, such as community design programs (e.g. nature playgardens), can educate people and influence their values while meeting myriad sustainability criteria. Birkeland designed and built the first real 'nature playgardens' in the 1980s that immerse children in nature while creating urban biodiversity incubators.
