= Janice Hammond =

American economist

Janice H. Hammond is an American economist, the Jesse Philips Professor of Manufacturing and the Senior Associate Dean for Culture and Community at the Harvard Business School.

Hammond earned a Ph.D. in 1985 from the Massachusetts Institute of Technology, with the dissertation Solving Asymmetric Variational Inequality Problems and Systems of Equations with Generalized Nonlinear Programming Algorithms supervised by Thomas Magnanti. She is the author of books including:

- Logistics and Strategy (ISEDI, 1993, with C. J. Ferrozi and R. D. Shapiro)
- A Stitch in Time: Lean Retailing and the Transformation of Manufacturing, Lessons from the Textile and Apparel Industries (Oxford University Press, 1999, with J. T. Dunlop, F. A. Abernathy, and D. Weil)
