= Janice Rymer =

Professor of obstetrics and gynaecology at King's College London

Janice Rymer is professor of obstetrics and gynaecology at King's College London and consultant gynecologist at Guy's and St Thomas' NHS Foundation Trust. She is a vice president of the Royal College of Obstetricians and Gynaecologists.

Rymer has a PhD on hormone replacement therapy from the University of Auckland.
