= Janice Baird =

American dramatic soprano

- Born: January 10, 1963 (age 62); New York City
- Occupation: dramatic soprano
- Website: Janice Baird

Janice Baird (born 10 January 1963) is an American dramatic soprano, best known for her interpretation of Wagner and Strauss. Baird was born in New York City.

== Education and life ==
Janice Baird was born and raised in a musical family in New York City, her mother a singer and her father a voice teacher. Baird has studied flute, voice, and acting, and speaks German, English, Italian, and Spanish. Married to a German actor, she currently lives in Berlin, Germany and in Andalucia, Spain.

== Work ==
Baird began her career as a mezzo-soprano and sang in German opera houses. Her roles included Tosca, Giulietta in Tales of Hoffmann, Amelia in Un ballo in maschera, Leonore in La forza del destino, Elisabetta in Don Carlos, Santuzza in Cavalleria rusticana, and Salome.

She studied with Astrid Varnay to develop the seminal dramatic soprano roles of Wagner and Strauss (Ortrud, Brünnhilde, Isolde, Elektra, and Salome) and took master classes with Birgit Nilsson.

She has sung most of the major Wagner dramatic soprano roles: Isolde in Tristan und Isolde in Buenos Aires, Rome, Hamburg, and Toulouse; Ortrud in Lohengrin at Semperoper Dresden and Bilbao; and Senta in Der fliegende Holländer at Santiago de Chile. She has sung Brünnhilde in Der Ring des Nibelungen in numerous houses in Europe, including the Deutsche Oper Berlin and the Opéra de Marseille, and will make her American debut in the role at Seattle in 2009. She has sung Kundry in Parsifal and Venus in Tannhäuser.

She frequently sings the Strauss dramatic soprano roles of Salome, Elektra, and the Dyer's Wife in Die Frau ohne Schatten. Her Italian repertoire includes the title role in Turandot, Abigaille in Nabucco, Lady Macbeth in Macbeth, and Minnie in La fanciulla del West.

She has sung Leonore in Fidelio for Deutsche Oper Berlin and in Avignon and Leipzig.

Baird first sang at the Metropolitan Opera in New York City on March 14, 2008 when she came on in the middle of Act II of Tristan und Isolde to replace an ailing Isolde, Deborah Voigt. She made her full debut at the Met singing Isolde to Ben Heppner's Tristan on March 25, 2008.

== Literature ==
- International Who’s who in Classical Music. 23rd Edition, Routledge, London and New York 2007, ISBN 978-1-85743-416-3, ISSN 1740-0155, p. 40 (google books)
