= Psychology and Aging =

- Discipline: Aging
- Language: English
- Edited by: Hannes Zacher

Publication details
- History: 1986-present
- Publisher: American Psychological Association (United States)
- Frequency: Quarterly
- Impact factor: 3.5 (2024)

Standard abbreviations
- ISO 4: Psychol. Aging

Indexing
- ISSN: 0882-7974 (print); 1939-1498 (web)

Links
- Journal homepage

Psychology and Aging is a monthly peer-reviewed scientific journal published by the American Psychological Association. The current editor-in-chief is Hannes Zacher (Leipzig University). It covers research on adult development and aging whether applied, biobehavioral, clinical, educational, experimental (laboratory, field, or naturalistic studies), methodological, or psychosocial.

The journal has implemented the Transparency and Openness Promotion (TOP) Guidelines. The TOP Guidelines provide structure to research planning and reporting and aim to make research more transparent, accessible, and reproducible.

== Abstracting and Indexing ==
The journal is abstracted and indexed by MEDLINE/PubMed and the Social Sciences Citation Index. According to the Journal Citation Reports, the journal has a 2024 impact factor of 3.5.
