= Janis Spindel =

American matchmaker, author, and entrepreneur

- Occupations: Matchmaker; author
- Website: www.janisspindelmatchmaker.com

Janis Spindel is a matchmaker, author, and entrepreneur. According to her website, she created the matchmaking service after matching fourteen couples who married within one year. Before entering the matchmaking field, she owned nine retail locations of "Mommy and Me". Spindel has been involved with several charities. Spindel is also a former fashion executive.

As the founder, her company, Janis Spindel Serious Matchmaking, Inc., was established in 1993 and is headquartered in New York City on the Upper East Side and, in the summer months, in the Hamptons. She had traveled to the US and Canada for her clients. The website was launched in 2005. She originally worked with both men and women, but now only works with men. She specializes in upscale professionals.

== Books ==
Her first book, Get Serious About Getting Married: 365 Proven Ways to Find Love in Less Than a Year, was published by HarperCollins in January 2006.

Her second book, How to Date Men: Dating Secrets from America's Top Matchmaker, was released in August 2007.
