= 2010 United States House of Representatives elections =

House elections for the 112th U.S. Congress

- November 2, 2010

All 435 seats in the United States House of Representatives (Note: In addition, five of the six non-voting delegates in the U.S. House of Representatives were elected.) 218 seats needed for a majority
- Turnout: 40.9% ▼13.6 pp
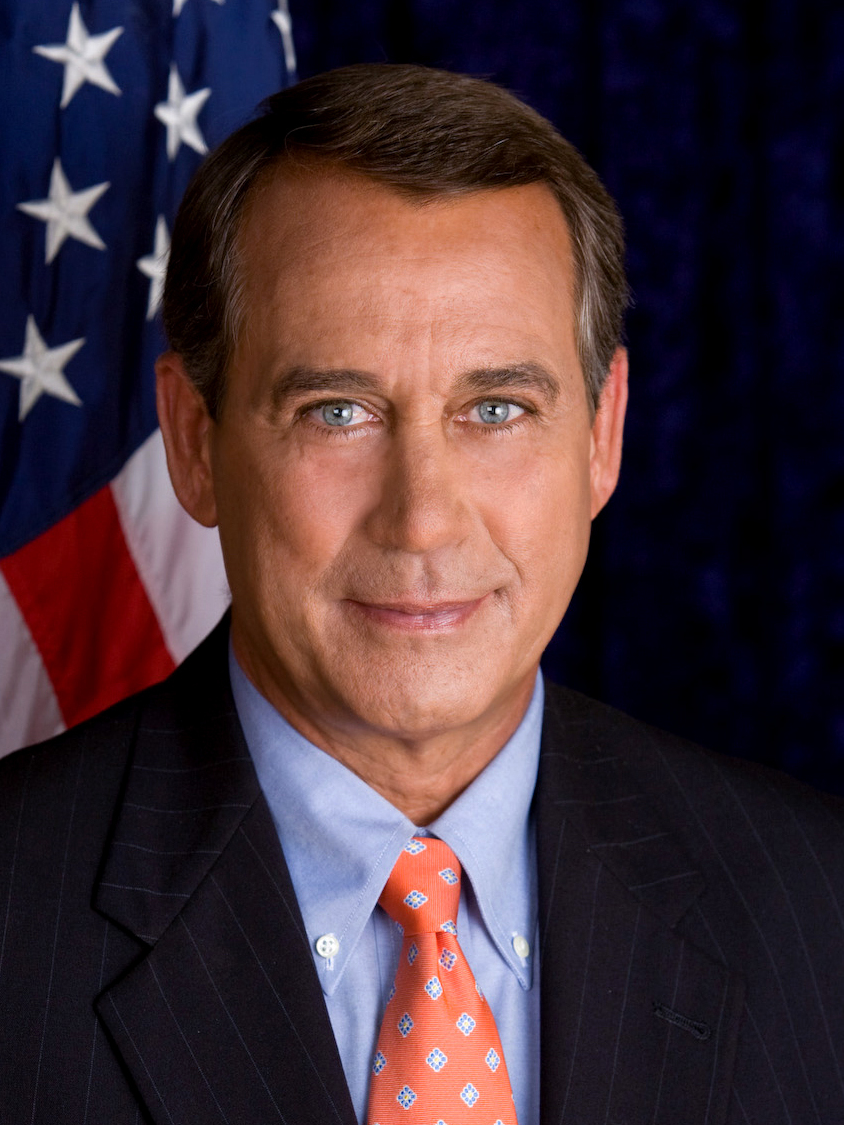

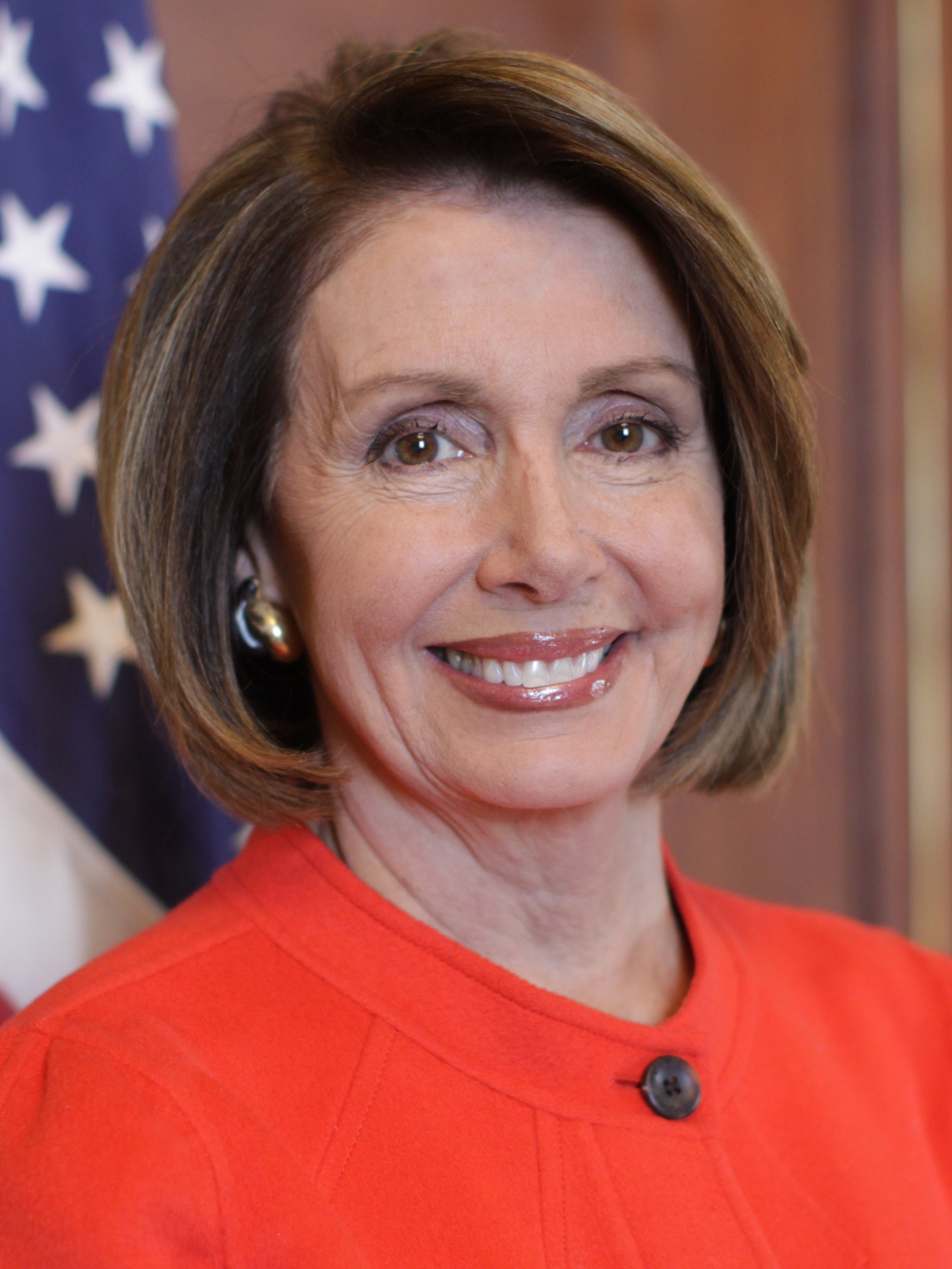
| | Majority party | Minority party |
|---|---|---|
| Leader | John Boehner | Nancy Pelosi |
| Party | Republican | Democratic |
| Leader since | January 3, 2007 | January 3, 2003 |
| Leader's seat | Ohio 8th | California 8th |
| Last election | 178 seats, 42.6% | 257 seats, 53.2% |
| Seats before | 179 | 256 |
| Seats won | 242 | 193 |
| Seat change | ▲63 | ▼63 |
| Popular vote | 44,829,751 | 38,980,192 |
| Percentage | 51.7% | 44.9% |
| Swing | ▲9.1pp | ▼8.3pp |
- Results: Democratic hold Democratic gain Republican hold Republican gain
Speaker before election
Nancy Pelosi
Democratic
Elected Speaker
John Boehner
Republican

The 2010 United States House of Representatives elections were held on November 2, 2010, as part of the 2010 midterm elections during President Barack Obama's first term in office. Voters of the 50 U.S. states chose 435 U.S. Representatives to serve in the 112th United States Congress. Also, voters of the U.S. territories, commonwealths and District of Columbia chose their non-voting delegates. (Note: The nonvoting delegates represent the District of Columbia; the territories of American Samoa, Guam and the Virgin Islands; and the commonwealths of the Northern Mariana Islands and Puerto Rico, see 48 U.S.C. § 16. They are all chosen biennially except for Puerto Rico's delegate, who is elected every four years and next faced reelection in 2012.) U.S. Senate elections and various state and local elections were held on the same date.

Republicans regained control of the U.S. House they had lost in the 2006 midterm election, picking up a net total of 62 seats and erasing the gains Democrats made in 2006 and 2008. Although the sitting president's party usually loses seats in a midterm election, the 2010 election resulted in the highest losses by a party in a House midterm election since 1938, as well as the largest House swing since 1948. In total, 52 House Democrats were defeated, including 36 freshman and sophomore representatives.

Republicans made their largest gain in House seats since 1938. Three Democratic committee chairmen were defeated: transportation chairman Jim Oberstar of Minnesota, armed services chairman Ike Skelton of Missouri, and budget chairman John Spratt of South Carolina. Democrats made three pick-ups, winning an open seat in Delaware and defeating Republican incumbents in Hawaii and Louisiana. (Note: Hawaii Republican Charles Djou was elected in a special election.)

The heavy Democratic Party losses in 2010 were attributed to anger at President Obama, opposition to the Affordable Care Act and American Recovery and Reinvestment Act, large budget deficits, and the weak economy.

This is the last election in which Democrats won a seat in Arkansas, and the last in which Republicans won more than one seat in Maryland, as well as both seats in New Hampshire.

== Background ==
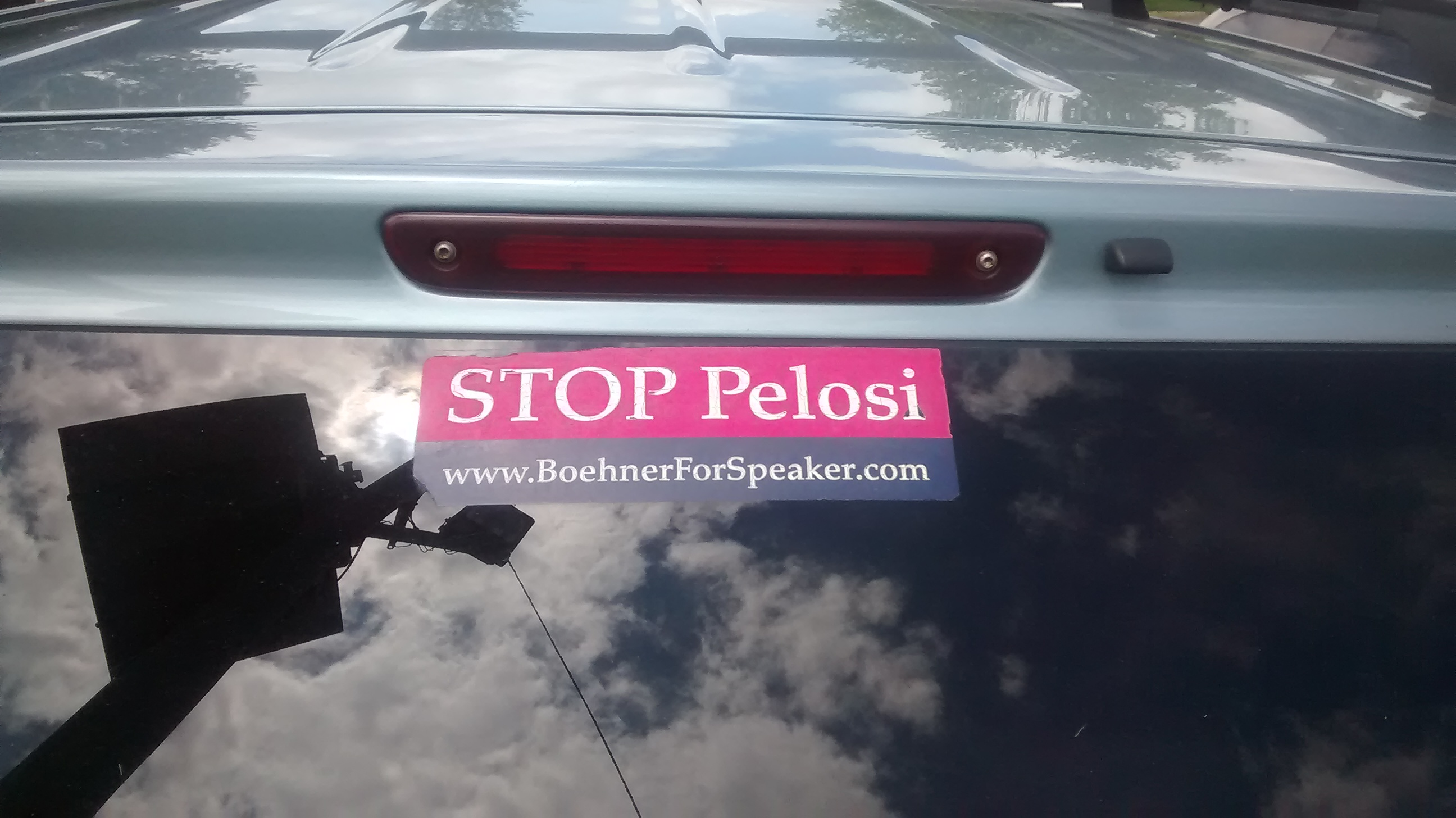
An anti-Pelosi "Boehner for Speaker" bumper sticker on a car window.

Following the 2006 elections, Democrats took control of the House as well as the Senate. In the 2008 elections, which coincided with Democrat Barack Obama's victory over Republican John McCain for the presidency, Democrats increased their majorities in both chambers. Of the 435 congressional districts, 242 were carried by Obama, while 193 voted for McCain. Of the districts Obama won, 34 elected a Republican to the House, while 49 of the districts McCain won elected a Democrat.

=== Republican gains ===
The Republicans' 63-seat pickup in the House to take control of that chamber, as well as their gain of six Senate seats, signified a dramatic rollback of recent Democratic gains. In the election, Republicans won their greatest number of House seats since 1946. This has been attributed to the continued economic recession, as well as President Obama's controversial stimulus and health care reform bills. Republicans also took control of 29 of the 50 state governorships and gained 690 seats in state legislatures, to hold their greatest number since the 1928 elections.

Republicans also made historic gains in state legislatures, adding more than 675 state legislative seats, by far surpassing their state-legislative gains in 1994. Republicans gained control of dozens of state legislative chambers, and took control of "seven more legislatures outright than they did after 1994 and the most since 1952." Republicans picked up control of the Alabama Legislature for the first time since Reconstruction; control of the North Carolina Senate for the first time since 1870; and control of the Minnesota Senate for the first time since the state returned to partisan elections in 1974.

The Great Lakes region, which until then had recently favored the Democratic Party, went strongly Republican. In California and the Pacific Northwest, however, the Democrats retained the upper hand. The biggest change in 2010 occurred in the Southern United States, which had previously been roughly evenly split between Democrats and Republicans for everything except for president. Just one white Democrat from the Deep South won reelection to the US House in 2010. Prior to 2010, many white conservative southerners had voted Republican for president, but Democratic for other offices.

== Results summary ==
=== Federal ===
↓
| 242 | 193 |
| Republican | Democratic |

| Parties (and Independents) | Seats | | | | Popular vote | | |
| Parties (and Independents) | 2008 | 2010 | | Share | Vote | % | |
|---|---|---|---|---|---|---|---|
| Republican Party | 178 | 242 | ▲64 | 55.6% | 44,829,751 | 51.7% | ▲9.1% |
| Democratic Party | 257 | 193 | ▼64 | 44.4% | 38,980,192 | 44.9% | ▼8.3% |
| Libertarian Party | — | — | — | — | 1,010,891 | 1.2% | ▲0.3% |
| Independent | — | — | — | — | 516,733 | 0.6% | Steady |
| Green Party | — | — | — | — | 252,688 | 0.3% | ▼0.2% |
| Constitution Party | — | — | — | — | 195,008 | 0.2% | ▲0.1% |
| Independence Party | — | — | — | — | 139,473 | 0.2% | ▲0.1% |
| American Independent Party | — | — | — | — | 56,907 | 0.1% | ▲0.1% |
| Others | — | — | — | — | 799,461 | 0.9% | ▼0.8% |
| Totals | 435 | 435 | 0 | 100.0% | 86,781,104 | 100.0% | Steady |

Popular vote
| Republican | 51.66% |
| Democratic | 44.92% |
| Libertarian | 1.16% |
| Green | 0.29% |
| Others | 1.97% |

House seats
| Republican | 55.63% |
| Democratic | 44.37% |

Sources: House Clerk – Statistics of the Congressional Election, 2010

=== Voter demographics ===
2010 U.S. House vote by demographic subgroup
| Demographic subgroup | DEM | GOP | Other | % of total vote |
|---|---|---|---|---|
| Total vote | 45 | 52 | 3 | 100 |
Ideology
| Liberals | 90 | 8 | 2 | 20 |
| Moderates | 55 | 42 | 3 | 38 |
| Conservatives | 13 | 84 | 3 | 42 |
Party
| Democrats | 91 | 7 | 2 | 35 |
| Republicans | 5 | 94 | 1 | 35 |
| Independents | 37 | 56 | 7 | 29 |
Gender
| Men | 41 | 55 | 4 | 48 |
| Women | 48 | 49 | 3 | 52 |
Race/ethnicity
| White | 37 | 60 | 3 | 77 |
| Black | 89 | 9 | 2 | 11 |
| Asian | 58 | 40 | 2 | 2 |
| Other | 53 | 44 | 3 | 2 |
| Hispanic (of any race) | 60 | 38 | 2 | 8 |
Gender by race/ethnicity
| White men | 34 | 62 | 4 | 38 |
| White women | 39 | 58 | 3 | 40 |
| Black men | 86 | 13 | 1 | 5 |
| Black women | 92 | 6 | 2 | 6 |
| Latino men (of any race) | 55 | 44 | 1 | 4 |
| Latino women (of any race) | 65 | 33 | 2 | 4 |
| All other races | 55 | 42 | 3 | 4 |
Religion
| Protestant | 38 | 59 | 3 | 55 |
| Catholic | 44 | 54 | 2 | 23 |
| Jewish | n/a | n/a | n/a | 2 |
| Other religion | 74 | 24 | 2 | 8 |
| None | 68 | 30 | 2 | 12 |
Religious service attendance
| Weekly | 40 | 58 | 2 | 48 |
| Less than weekly | 53 | 44 | 3 | 52 |
White evangelical or born-again Christian
| White evangelical or born-again Christian | 19 | 77 | 4 | 25 |
| Everyone else | 55 | 42 | 3 | 75 |
Age
| 18–24 years old | 57 | 39 | 4 | 6 |
| 25–29 years old | 54 | 44 | 2 | 6 |
| 30–39 years old | 47 | 48 | 5 | 14 |
| 40–49 years old | 43 | 54 | 3 | 21 |
| 50–64 years old | 46 | 52 | 2 | 32 |
| 65 and older | 38 | 59 | 3 | 21 |
Sexual orientation
| LGBT | 69 | 29 | 2 | 3 |
| Non-LGBT | 46 | 52 | 2 | 97 |
Education
| Not a high school graduate | 57 | 36 | 7 | 3 |
| High school graduate | 46 | 52 | 2 | 17 |
| Some college education | 43 | 53 | 4 | 28 |
| College graduate | 40 | 58 | 2 | 30 |
| Postgraduate education | 53 | 45 | 2 | 21 |
Education by race/ethnicity
| White college graduates | 39 | 58 | 3 | 42 |
| White no college degree | 33 | 63 | 4 | 35 |
| Non-white college graduates | 70 | 28 | 2 | 9 |
| Non-white no college degree | 75 | 23 | 2 | 13 |
Family income
| Under $30,000 | 57 | 40 | 3 | 17 |
| $30,000–49,999 | 51 | 46 | 3 | 19 |
| $50,000–74,999 | 45 | 51 | 4 | 21 |
| $75,000–99,999 | 42 | 56 | 2 | 15 |
| $100,000–199,999 | 43 | 56 | 1 | 19 |
| Over $200,000 | 34 | 64 | 2 | 8 |
Family income by race
| Whites under $50,000 | 42 | 54 | 4 | 25 |
| Whites over $50,000 | 37 | 61 | 3 | 53 |
| Non-whites under $50,000 | 80 | 19 | 1 | 11 |
| Non-whites over $50,000 | 69 | 29 | 2 | 11 |
Union households
| Union | 61 | 37 | 2 | 17 |
| Non-union | 43 | 54 | 3 | 83 |
Issue regarded as most important
| War in Afghanistan | 58 | 40 | 2 | 7 |
| Health care | 51 | 47 | 2 | 18 |
| Economy | 43 | 54 | 3 | 63 |
| Illegal immigration | 26 | 68 | 6 | 8 |
Region
| Northeast | 54 | 44 | 2 | 21 |
| Midwest | 44 | 53 | 3 | 25 |
| South | 37 | 61 | 2 | 31 |
| West | 49 | 48 | 3 | 23 |
Community size
| Urban | 56 | 41 | 3 | 31 |
| Suburban | 42 | 55 | 3 | 49 |
| Rural | 36 | 61 | 3 | 20 |

Source: CNN exit poll

=== Maps ===
House seats by party holding majority in state

Popular vote by states

Results shaded according to winning candidates share of vote

== Retiring incumbents ==
Retiring incumbents by district Democratic incumbent ran Democratic incumbent retired or lost renomination Republican incumbent ran Republican incumbent retired or lost renomination Vacant district

37 incumbents retired.

=== Democrats ===
17 incumbent Democrats retired.

- Alabama 7: Artur Davis: To run for Governor of Alabama.
- Arkansas 1: Marion Berry: Retired due to health concerns.
- Arkansas 2: Vic Snyder: Retired to spend more time with family.
- California 33: Diane Watson: Retired; "It should be a seat inherited by someone who can represent everyone in this district."
- Florida 17: Kendrick Meek: To run for U.S. Senator.
- Indiana 8: Brad Ellsworth: To run for U.S. Senator.
- Kansas 3: Dennis Moore: Retired; "Time for a new generation of leadership."
- Louisiana 3: Charlie Melançon: To run for U.S. Senator.
- Massachusetts 10: Bill Delahunt: Retired; "Life is about change. I think it's healthy. It's time."
- Michigan 1: Bart Stupak: Retired; "I've accomplished what I want to do."
- New Hampshire 2: Paul Hodes: To run for U.S. Senator.
- Pennsylvania 7: Joe Sestak: To run for U.S. Senator.
- Rhode Island 1: Patrick J. Kennedy: Retired to "[take] a new direction."
- Tennessee 6: Bart Gordon: Retired; "...it's time for a new chapter."
- Tennessee 8: John S. Tanner: Retired; decided 20 years was long enough.
- Washington 3: Brian Baird: Retired, to pursue other options.
- Wisconsin 7: Dave Obey: Retired; "But even more frankly, I am bone tired." Media reports indicated Obey's future plans included joining a DC lobbying firm run by former Representative Dick Gephardt.

=== Republicans ===
19 incumbent Republicans retired.

- Arkansas 3: John Boozman: to run for U.S. Senator.
- Arizona 3: John Shadegg: to pursue other interests.
- California 19: George Radanovich: to put family obligations first.
- Delaware at-large: Mike Castle: to run for U.S. Senator.
- Florida 5: Ginny Brown-Waite: due to health issues.
- Florida 12: Adam Putnam: to run for Florida Commissioner of Agriculture.
- Florida 21: Lincoln Díaz-Balart: to return to law practice.
- Georgia 7: John Linder
- Illinois 10: Mark Kirk: to run for U.S. Senator.
- Indiana 4: Steve Buyer: due to wife's illness
- Kansas 1: Jerry Moran: to run for U.S. Senator.
- Kansas 4: Todd Tiahrt: to run for U.S. Senator.
- Michigan 2: Pete Hoekstra: to run for Governor of Michigan.
- Michigan 3: Vern Ehlers
- Missouri 7: Roy Blunt: to run for U.S. Senator.
- Oklahoma 5: Mary Fallin: to run for Governor of Oklahoma.
- South Carolina 1: Henry E. Brown Jr.: to spend more time with his family.
- South Carolina 3: Gresham Barrett: to run for Governor of South Carolina.
- Tennessee 3: Zach Wamp: to run for Governor of Tennessee.

== Incumbents defeated ==
There were nine Democrats who survived reelection in the 1994 Republican Revolution, but were defeated this year.

=== Lost renomination ===
==== Democrats ====
Two Democrats lost renomination. One seat was held by Democrats, while the other flipped to Republicans.

- Michigan 13: Carolyn Cheeks Kilpatrick lost to Hansen Clarke.
- West Virginia 1: Alan Mollohan lost to Mike Oliverio, who lost the general election to David McKinley.

==== Republicans ====
Two Republicans lost renomination. Both seats were eventually held by Republicans.

- Alabama 5: Parker Griffith (first elected in 2008 as a Democrat; switched parties in 2009) lost to Mo Brooks.
- South Carolina 4: Bob Inglis lost to Trey Gowdy.

=== Lost re-election ===
54 incumbents lost in the general election; all but two were Democrats. Many of the Democrats who lost had been initially elected in the Democratic wave years of 2006 and 2008, and several others were longtime incumbents from the southeast. Of the Democrats who lost, 11 were first elected in 2006, and 22 were first elected in 2008.

==== Democrats ====
52 Democrats lost re-election.

- Alabama 2, Bobby Bright (first elected in 2008) lost to Martha Roby
- Arizona 1, Ann Kirkpatrick (first elected in 2008) lost to Paul Gosar
- Arizona 5, Harry Mitchell (first elected in 2006) lost to David Schweikert
- Colorado 3, John Salazar (first elected in 2004) lost to Scott Tipton
- Colorado 4, Betsy Markey (first elected in 2008) lost to Cory Gardner
- Florida 2, Allen Boyd (first elected in 1996) lost to Steve Southerland
- Florida 8, Alan Grayson (first elected in 2008) lost to Daniel Webster
- Florida 22, Ron Klein (first elected in 2006) lost to Allen West
- Florida 24, Suzanne Kosmas (first elected in 2008) lost to Sandy Adams
- Georgia 8, Jim Marshall (first elected in 2002) lost to Austin Scott
- Idaho 1, Walt Minnick (first elected in 2008) lost to Raúl Labrador
- Illinois 8, Melissa Bean (first elected in 2004) lost to Joe Walsh
- Illinois 11, Debbie Halvorson (first elected in 2008) lost to Adam Kinzinger
- Illinois 14, Bill Foster (first elected in 2008) lost to Randy Hultgren
- Illinois 17, Phil Hare (first elected in 2006) lost to Bobby Schilling
- Indiana 9, Baron Hill (originally elected in 1998) lost to Todd Young
- Maryland 1, Frank Kratovil (first elected in 2008) lost to Andrew P. Harris
- Michigan 7, Mark Schauer (first elected in 2008) lost to Tim Walberg
- Minnesota 8, Jim Oberstar (first elected in 1974) lost to Chip Cravaack
- Mississippi 1, Travis Childers (first elected in 2008) lost to Alan Nunnelee
- Mississippi 4, Gene Taylor (first elected in 1989) lost to Steven Palazzo
- Missouri 4, Ike Skelton (first elected in 1976) lost to Vicky Hartzler
- Nevada 3, Dina Titus (first elected in 2008) lost to Joe Heck
- New Hampshire 1, Carol Shea-Porter (first elected in 2006) lost to Frank Guinta
- New Jersey 3, John Adler (first elected in 2008) lost to Jon Runyan
- New Mexico 2, Harry Teague (first elected in 2008) lost to Steve Pearce
- New York 13, Michael McMahon (first elected in 2008) lost to Michael Grimm
- New York 19, John Hall (first elected in 2006) lost to Nan Hayworth
- New York 20, Scott Murphy (first elected in 2009) lost to Chris Gibson
- New York 24, Mike Arcuri (first elected in 2006) lost to Richard Hanna
- New York 25, Dan Maffei (first elected in 2008) lost to Ann Marie Buerkle
- North Carolina 2, Bob Etheridge (first elected in 1996) lost to Renee Ellmers
- North Dakota at-large, Earl Pomeroy (first elected in 1992) lost to Rick Berg
- Ohio 1, Steve Driehaus (first elected in 2008) lost to Steve Chabot
- Ohio 6, Charlie Wilson (first elected in 2006) lost to Bill Johnson
- Ohio 15, Mary Jo Kilroy (first elected in 2008) lost to Steve Stivers
- Ohio 16, John Boccieri (first elected in 2008) lost to Jim Renacci
- Ohio 18, Zack Space (first elected in 2006) lost to Bob Gibbs
- Pennsylvania 3, Kathy Dahlkemper (first elected in 2008) lost to Mike Kelly
- Pennsylvania 8, Patrick Murphy (first elected in 2006) lost to Mike Fitzpatrick
- Pennsylvania 10, Chris Carney (first elected in 2006) lost to Tom Marino
- Pennsylvania 11, Paul E. Kanjorski (first elected in 1984) lost to Lou Barletta
- South Carolina 5, John Spratt (first elected in 1982) lost to Mick Mulvaney
- South Dakota at-large, Stephanie Herseth Sandlin (first elected in 2004) lost to Kristi Noem
- Tennessee 4, Lincoln Davis (first elected in 2002) lost to Scott DesJarlais
- Texas 17, Chet Edwards (first elected in 1990) lost to Bill Flores
- Texas 23, Ciro Rodriguez (originally elected in 1996) lost to Quico Canseco
- Texas 27, Solomon P. Ortiz (first elected in 1982) lost to Blake Farenthold
- Virginia 2, Glenn Nye (first elected in 2008) lost to Scott Rigell
- Virginia 5, Tom Perriello (first elected in 2008) lost to Robert Hurt
- Virginia 9, Rick Boucher (first elected in 1982) lost to Morgan Griffith
- Wisconsin 8, Steve Kagen (first elected in 2006) lost to Reid Ribble

==== Republicans ====
Two Republicans lost re-election.

- Hawaii 1, Charles Djou (first elected in a May 2010 special election) lost to Colleen Hanabusa
- Louisiana 2, Joseph Cao (first elected in 2008) lost to Cedric Richmond

== Open seats that changed parties ==
=== Democratic seats won by Republicans ===
14 open seats, held by Democrats, were won by Republicans.

- Arkansas 1: Won by Rick Crawford
- Arkansas 2: Won by Tim Griffin
- Indiana 8: Won by Larry Bucshon
- Kansas 3: Won by Kevin Yoder
- Louisiana 3: Won by Jeff Landry
- Michigan 1: Won by Dan Benishek
- New Hampshire 2: Won by Charles Bass
- New York 29: Won by Tom Reed
- Pennsylvania 7: Won by Pat Meehan
- Tennessee 6: Won by Diane Black
- Tennessee 8: Won by Stephen Fincher
- Washington 3: Won by Jaime Herrera Beutler
- West Virginia 1: Won by David McKinley
- Wisconsin 7: Won by Sean Duffy

=== Republican seats won by Democrats ===
One open seat, held by a Republican, was won by a Democrat.

- ▌Delaware at-large: Won by John Carney

== Closest races ==
Eighty-four races were decided by 10% or lower.

| District | Winner | Margin |
|---|---|---|
| Illinois 8th | Republican (flip) | 0.15% |
| Kentucky 6th | Democratic | 0.27% |
| New York 1st | Democratic | 0.30% |
| New York 25th | Republican (flip) | 0.32% |
| Virginia 11th | Democratic | 0.44% |
| Nevada 3rd | Republican (flip) | 0.66% |
| Texas 27th | Republican (flip) | 0.75% |
| North Carolina 2nd | Republican (flip) | 0.79% |
| West Virginia 1st | Republican (flip) | 0.80% |
| California 11th | Democratic | 1.11% |
| New York 23rd | Democratic | 1.15% |
| Indiana 2nd | Democratic | 1.34% |
| Arizona 8th | Democratic | 1.46% |
| Pennsylvania 12th | Democratic | 1.56% |
| New Hampshire 2nd | Republican (flip) | 1.58% |
| Minnesota 8th | Republican (flip) | 1.59% |
| Pennsylvania 4th | Democratic | 1.62% |
| Iowa 1st | Democratic | 1.99% |
| Washington 2nd | Democratic | 2.14% |
| Illinois 10th | Republican | 2.16% |
| Alabama 2nd | Republican (flip) | 2.18% |
| South Dakota at-large | Republican (flip) | 2.23% |
| Missouri 3rd | Democratic | 2.28% |
| Michigan 9th | Democratic | 2.53% |
| New Jersey 3rd | Republican (flip) | 2.67% |
| Georgia 2nd | Democratic | 2.88% |
| New York 13th | Republican (flip) | 3.35% |
| California 20th | Democratic | 3.40% |
| New Mexico 1st | Democratic | 3.60% |
| Wisconsin 3rd | Democratic | 3.80% |
| Virginia 5th | Republican (flip) | 3.83% |
| Washington 8th | Republican | 4.10% |
| Iowa 3rd | Democratic | 4.24% |
| Colorado 3rd | Republican (flip) | 4.34% |
| Utah 2nd | Democratic | 4.43% |
| Massachusetts 10th | Democratic | 4.49% |
| Michigan 7th | Republican (flip) | 4.78% |
| Virginia 9th | Republican (flip) | 4.80% |
| Texas 23rd | Republican (flip) | 4.96% |
| Ohio 6th | Republican (flip) | 5.04% |
| Iowa 2nd | Democratic | 5.07% |
| Mississippi 4th | Republican (flip) | 5.10% |
| Minnesota 1st | Democratic | 5.29% |
| Oregon 5th | Democratic | 5.29% |
| Missouri 4th | Republican (flip) | 5.32% |
| New York 22nd | Democratic | 5.32% |
| New York 19th | Republican (flip) | 5.36% |
| Georgia 8th | Republican (flip) | 5.40% |
| Ohio 1st | Republican (flip) | 5.50% (Note: "tipping-point state") |
| Washington 3rd | Republican (flip) | 5.94% |
| Arizona 1st | Republican (flip) | 5.99% |
| Arizona 7th | Democratic | 6.00% |
| Rhode Island 1st | Democratic | 6.04% |
| Connecticut 4th | Democratic | 6.13% |
| New York 24th | Republican (flip) | 6.16% |
| Illinois 14th | Republican (flip) | 6.27% |
| Hawaii 1st | Democratic (flip) | 6.46% |
| California 3rd | Republican | 6.89% |
| Florida 12th | Republican | 7.00% |
| New Jersey 12th | Democratic | 7.03% |
| Pennsylvania 8th | Republican (flip) | 7.04% |
| New York 4th | Democratic | 7.24% |
| North Carolina 7th | Democratic | 7.36% |
| Wisconsin 7th | Republican (flip) | 7.69% |
| Texas 25th | Democratic | 7.98% |
| Connecticut 5th | Democratic | 8.13% |
| Arkansas 1st | Republican (flip) | 8.30% |
| North Carolina 11th | Democratic | 8.68% |
| Michigan 5th | Democratic | 8.70% |
| Florida 22nd | Republican (flip) | 8.72% |
| Arizona 5th | Republican (flip) | 8.77% |
| Missouri 5th | Democratic | 9.15% |
| Ohio 10th | Democratic | 9.18% |
| North Carolina 8th | Democratic | 9.35% |
| California 45th | Republican | 9.35% |
| Pennsylvania 11th | Republican (flip) | 9.40% |
| Florida 25th | Republican | 9.56% |
| Illinois 17th | Republican (flip) | 9.62% |
| Wisconsin 8th | Republican (flip) | 9.66% |
| Washington 9th | Democratic | 9.70% |
| South Carolina 2nd | Republican | 9.71% |
| New York 20th | Republican (flip) | 9.74% |
| Idaho 1st | Republican (flip) | 9.74% |
| North Dakota at-large | Republican (flip) | 9.81% |

== Special elections ==
There were six special elections in 2010 to the 111th United States Congress, listed here by date and district.

| District | Incumbent | | | This race | |
| District | Member | Party | First elected | Results | Candidates |
|---|---|---|---|---|---|
| Florida 19 | Robert Wexler | Democratic | 1996 | Incumbent resigned January 3, 2010 to become Director of the Center for Middle East Peace. New member elected April 13, 2010. Democratic hold. | ▌ ✓ Ted Deutch (Democratic) 62.1%; ▌Edward Lynch (Republican) 35.2%; ▌Jim McCormick (Independent) 2.7% |
| Pennsylvania 12 | John Murtha | Democratic | 1974 (special) | Incumbent died February 8, 2010, due to surgery complications. New member elected May 18, 2010. Democratic hold. | ▌ ✓ Mark Critz (Democratic) 52.6%; ▌Tim Burns (Republican) 45.1%; ▌Demo Agoris (Libertarian) 2.3% |
| Hawaii 1 | Neil Abercrombie | Democratic | 1990 | Incumbent resigned February 28, 2010 to run for Governor of Hawaii. New member elected May 22, 2010. Republican gain. | ▌ ✓ Charles Djou (Republican) 39.4%; ▌Colleen Hanabusa (Democratic) 30.8%; ▌Ed Case (Democratic) 27.6% |
| Georgia 9 | Nathan Deal | Republican | 1992 (Note: Deal was originally elected as a Democrat. He switched parties in April 1995.) | Incumbent resigned March 21, 2010 to run for Governor of Georgia. New member elected June 8, 2010. Republican hold. | ▌ ✓ Tom Graves (Republican) 56.4%; ▌Lee Hawkins (Republican) 43.6% |
| Indiana 3 | Mark Souder | Republican | 1994 | Incumbent resigned May 21, 2010 amid affair scandal. New member elected November 2, 2010. Republican hold. | ▌ ✓ Marlin Stutzman (Republican) 62.7%; ▌Tom Hayhurst (Democratic) 33.0%; ▌Scott W. Wise (Libertarian) 4.3% |
| New York 29 | Eric Massa | Democratic | 2008 | Incumbent resigned March 8, 2010 following sexual misconduct allegations. New member elected November 2, 2010. Republican gain. | ▌ ✓ Tom Reed (Republican) 56.7%; ▌Matthew Zeller (Democratic) 43.1% |

== Alabama ==
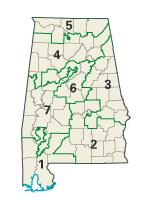
Alabama's congressional districts

| District | | Incumbent | | | Results | Candidates |
| District | Cook PVI (2008) | Representative | Party | First elected | Results | Candidates |
|---|---|---|---|---|---|---|
| Alabama 1 | R+14 | Jo Bonner | Republican | 2002 | Incumbent re-elected. | ▌ ✓ Jo Bonner (Republican) 83.0%; ▌David Walter (Constitution) 17.0% |
| Alabama 2 | R+16 | Bobby Bright | Democratic | 2008 | Incumbent lost re-election. Republican gain. | ▌ ✓ Martha Roby (Republican) 51.3%; ▌Bobby Bright (Democratic) 48.7% |
| Alabama 3 | R+9 | Mike D. Rogers | Republican | 2002 | Incumbent re-elected. | ▌ ✓ Mike D. Rogers (Republican) 59.1%; ▌Steve Segrest (Democratic) 40.9% |
| Alabama 4 | R+26 | Robert Aderholt | Republican | 1996 | Incumbent re-elected. | ▌ ✓ Robert Aderholt (Republican) 98.8% |
| Alabama 5 | R+12 | Parker Griffith | Republican | 2008 (Note: Griffith was first elected as a Democrat. He became a Republican in December 2009.) | Incumbent lost renomination. Republican hold. | ▌ ✓ Mo Brooks (Republican) 58.5%; ▌Steve Raby (Democratic) 41.5% |
| Alabama 6 | R+29 | Spencer Bachus | Republican | 1992 | Incumbent re-elected. | ▌ ✓ Spencer Bachus (Republican) 98.1% |
| Alabama 7 | D+18 | Artur Davis | Democratic | 2002 | Incumbent retired to run for Governor of Alabama. Democratic hold. | ▌ ✓ Terri Sewell (Democratic) 72.6%; ▌Don Chamberlain (Republican) 27.4% |

== Alaska ==
Alaska's results

| District | | Incumbent | | | Results | Candidates |
| District | Cook PVI (2008) | Member | Party | First elected | Results | Candidates |
|---|---|---|---|---|---|---|
| Alaska at-large | R+13 | Don Young | Republican | 1973 | Incumbent re-elected. | ▌ ✓ Don Young (Republican) 69.0%; ▌Harry Crawford (Democratic) 30.5% |

== Arizona ==
Arizona's results

| District | | Incumbent | | | Results | Candidates |
| District | Cook PVI (2008) | Member | Party | First elected | Results | Candidates |
|---|---|---|---|---|---|---|
| Arizona 1 | R+6 | Ann Kirkpatrick | Democratic | 2008 | Incumbent lost re-election. Republican gain. | ▌ ✓ Paul Gosar (Republican) 49.7%; ▌Ann Kirkpatrick (Democratic) 43.7%; ▌Nicole Patti (Libertarian) 6.6% |
| Arizona 2 | R+13 | Trent Franks | Republican | 2002 | Incumbent re-elected. | ▌ ✓ Trent Franks (Republican) 64.9%; ▌John Thrasher (Democratic) 31.1%; ▌Powell Gammill (Libertarian) 4.0% |
| Arizona 3 | R+9 | John Shadegg | Republican | 1994 | Incumbent retired. Republican hold. | ▌ ✓ Ben Quayle (Republican) 52.2%; ▌Jon Hulburd (Democratic) 41.1%; ▌Michael Shoen (Libertarian) 5.0%; ▌Leonard Clark (Green) 1.6% |
| Arizona 4 | D+13 | Ed Pastor | Democratic | 1991 (special) | Incumbent re-elected. | ▌ ✓ Ed Pastor (Democratic) 66.9%; ▌Janet Contreras (Republican) 27.5%; ▌Joe Cobb (Libertarian) 3.0%; ▌Rebecca DeWitt (Green) 2.6% |
| Arizona 5 | R+5 | Harry Mitchell | Democratic | 2006 | Incumbent lost re-election. Republican gain. | ▌ ✓ David Schweikert (Republican) 52.0%; ▌Harry Mitchell (Democratic) 43.2%; ▌Nick Coons (Libertarian) 4.8% |
| Arizona 6 | R+15 | Jeff Flake | Republican | 2000 | Incumbent re-elected. | ▌ ✓ Jeff Flake (Republican) 66.4%; ▌Rebecca Schneider (Democratic) 29.1%; ▌Richard Grayson (Green) 3.1%; ▌Darell Tapp (Libertarian) 1.4% |
| Arizona 7 | D+6 | Raúl Grijalva | Democratic | 2002 | Incumbent re-elected. | ▌ ✓ Raúl Grijalva (Democratic) 50.2%; ▌Ruth McClung (Republican) 44.2%; ▌Harley Meyer (Independent) 2.8%; ▌George Keane (Libertarian) 2.7% |
| Arizona 8 | R+4 | Gabby Giffords | Democratic | 2006 | Incumbent re-elected. | ▌ ✓ Gabby Giffords (Democratic) 48.8%; ▌Jesse Kelly (Republican) 47.3%; ▌Steven Stoltz (Libertarian) 3.9% |

== Arkansas ==
| District | | Incumbent | | | Results | Candidates |
| District | Cook PVI (2008) | Member | Party | First elected | Results | Candidates |
|---|---|---|---|---|---|---|
| Arkansas 1 | R+8 | Robert Marion Berry | Democratic | 1996 | Incumbent retired. Republican gain. | ▌ ✓ Rick Crawford (Republican) 51.8%; ▌Chad Causey (Democratic) 43.5%; ▌Ken Adler (Green) 4.6% |
| Arkansas 2 | R+5 | Vic Snyder | Democratic | 1996 | Incumbent retired. Republican gain. | ▌ ✓ Timothy Griffin (Republican) 57.9%; ▌Joyce Elliott (Democratic) 38.3%; ▌Lance Levi (Independent) 2.1%; ▌Lewis Kennedy (Green) 1.7% |
| Arkansas 3 | R+16 | John Boozman | Republican | 2000 | Incumbent retired to run for U.S. Senator. Republican hold. | ▌ ✓ Steve Womack (Republican) 72.4%; ▌David Whitaker (Democratic) 27.6% |
| Arkansas 4 | R+7 | Mike Ross | Democratic | 2000 | Incumbent re-elected. | ▌ ✓ Mike Ross (Democratic) 57.5%; ▌Beth Anne Rankin (Republican) 40.2%; ▌Joshua Drake (Green) 2.3% |

== California ==
California's results

| District | | Incumbent | | | Results | Candidates |
| District | Cook PVI (2008) | Member | Party | First elected | Results | Candidates |
|---|---|---|---|---|---|---|
| California 1 | D+13 | Mike Thompson | Democratic | 1998 | Incumbent re-elected. | ▌ ✓ Mike Thompson (Democratic) 63.0%; ▌Ron Hanks (Republican) 31.0%; ▌Carol Wolman (Green) 3.5%; ▌Mike Rodrigues (Libertarian) 2.5% |
| California 2 | R+11 | Wally Herger | Republican | 1988 | Incumbent re-elected. | ▌ ✓ Wally Herger (Republican) 57.1%; ▌Jim Reed (Democratic) 42.9% |
| California 3 | R+6 | Dan Lungren | Republican | 1978; 1988 (retired); 2004 | Incumbent re-elected. | ▌ ✓ Dan Lungren (Republican) 50.1%; ▌Ami Bera (Democratic) 43.2%; ▌Jerry Leidecker (American Independent) 2.5%; ▌Art Tuma (Libertarian) 2.4%; ▌Mike Roskey (Peace and Freedom) 1.8% |
| California 4 | R+10 | Tom McClintock | Republican | 2008 | Incumbent re-elected. | ▌ ✓ Tom McClintock (Republican) 61.3%; ▌Clint Curtis (Democratic) 31.4%; ▌Ben Emery (Green) 7.3% |
| California 5 | D+15 | Doris Matsui | Democratic | 2005 (special) | Incumbent re-elected. | ▌ ✓ Doris Matsui (Democratic) 72.0%; ▌Paul Smith (Republican) 25.3%; ▌Jerry Frink (Peace and Freedom) 2.7% |
| California 6 | D+23 | Lynn Woolsey | Democratic | 1992 | Incumbent re-elected. | ▌ ✓ Lynn Woolsey (Democratic) 65.9%; ▌Jim Judd (Republican) 29.6%; ▌Gene Ruyle (Peace and Freedom) 2.3%; ▌Joel Smolen (Libertarian) 2.2% |
| California 7 | D+19 | George Miller | Democratic | 1974 | Incumbent re-elected. | ▌ ✓ George Miller (Democratic) 68.3%; ▌Rick Tubbs (Republican) 31.7% |
| California 8 | D+35 | Nancy Pelosi | Democratic | 1987 (special) | Incumbent re-elected. | ▌ ✓ Nancy Pelosi (Democratic) 80.1%; ▌John Dennis (Republican) 15.1%; ▌Gloria La Riva (Peace and Freedom) 2.5%; ▌Philip Berg (Libertarian) 2.3% |
| California 9 | D+37 | Barbara Lee | Democratic | 1998 | Incumbent re-elected. | ▌ ✓ Barbara Lee (Democratic) 84.3%; ▌Jerry Hashimoto (Republican) 10.8%; ▌Dave Heller (Green) 2.3%; ▌Jim Eyer (Libertarian) 1.9%; ▌Larry Allen (Peace and Freedom) 0.8% |
| California 10 | D+11 | John Garamendi | Democratic | 2009 (special) | Incumbent re-elected. | ▌ ✓ John Garamendi (Democratic) 58.8%; ▌Gary Clift (Republican) 37.9%; ▌Jeremy Cloward (Green) 3.3% |
| California 11 | R+1 | Jerry McNerney | Democratic | 2006 | Incumbent re-elected. | ▌ ✓ Jerry McNerney (Democratic) 48.0%; ▌David Harmer (Republican) 46.9%; ▌David Christensen (American Independent) 5.2% |
| California 12 | D+23 | Jackie Speier | Democratic | 2008 | Incumbent re-elected. | ▌ ✓ Jackie Speier (Democratic) 75.6%; ▌Michael Moloney (Republican) 22.1%; ▌Mark Williams (Libertarian) 2.3% |
| California 13 | D+22 | Pete Stark | Democratic | 1972 | Incumbent re-elected. | ▌ ✓ Pete Stark (Democratic) 72.0%; ▌Forest Baker (Republican) 27.7% |
| California 14 | D+21 | Anna Eshoo | Democratic | 1992 | Incumbent re-elected. | ▌ ✓ Anna Eshoo (Democratic) 69.1%; ▌Dave Chapman (Republican) 27.8%; ▌Paul Lazaga (Libertarian) 3.1% |
| California 15 | D+15 | Mike Honda | Democratic | 2000 | Incumbent re-elected. | ▌ ✓ Mike Honda (Democratic) 67.6%; ▌Scott Kirkland (Republican) 32.4% |
| California 16 | D+16 | Zoe Lofgren | Democratic | 1994 | Incumbent re-elected. | ▌ ✓ Zoe Lofgren (Democratic) 67.8%; ▌Dan Sahagún (Republican) 24.3%; ▌Edward Gonzalez (Libertarian) 7.9% |
| California 17 | D+19 | Sam Farr | Democratic | 1992 | Incumbent re-elected. | ▌ ✓ Sam Farr (Democratic) 66.7%; ▌Jeff Taylor (Republican) 29.9%; ▌Eric Petersen (Green) 1.9%; ▌Mary Larkin (Libertarian) 1.5% |
| California 18 | D+4 | Dennis Cardoza | Democratic | 2002 | Incumbent re-elected. | ▌ ✓ Dennis Cardoza (Democratic) 58.5%; ▌Mike Berryhill (Republican) 41.5% |
| California 19 | R+9 | George Radanovich | Republican | 1994 | Incumbent retired. Republican hold. | ▌ ✓ Jeff Denham (Republican) 64.6%; ▌Loraine Goodwin (Democratic) 35.1% |
| California 20 | D+5 | Jim Costa | Democratic | 2004 | Incumbent re-elected. | ▌ ✓ Jim Costa (Democratic) 51.7%; ▌Andy Vidak (Republican) 48.3% |
| California 21 | R+14 | Devin Nunes | Republican | 2002 | Incumbent re-elected. | ▌ ✓ Devin Nunes (Republican) 100% |
| California 22 | R+16 | Kevin McCarthy | Republican | 2006 | Incumbent re-elected. | ▌ ✓ Kevin McCarthy (Republican) 98.8% |
| California 23 | D+12 | Lois Capps | Democratic | 1998 | Incumbent re-elected. | ▌ ✓ Lois Capps (Democratic) 57.8%; ▌Tom Watson (Republican) 37.6%; ▌John Hager (Independent) 2.9%; ▌Darrell Stafford (Libertarian) 1.7% |
| California 24 | R+4 | Elton Gallegly | Republican | 1986 | Incumbent re-elected. | ▌ ✓ Elton Gallegly (Republican) 59.9%; ▌Tim Allison (Democratic) 40.1% |
| California 25 | R+6 | Howard McKeon | Republican | 1992 | Incumbent re-elected. | ▌ ✓ Howard McKeon (Republican) 61.8%; ▌Jackie Conaway (Democratic) 38.2% |
| California 26 | R+3 | David Dreier | Republican | 1980 | Incumbent re-elected. | ▌ ✓ David Dreier (Republican) 54.1%; ▌Russ Warner (Democratic) 36.5%; ▌David Miller (American Independent) 6.1%; ▌Randall Weissbuch (Libertarian) 3.2% |
| California 27 | D+13 | Brad Sherman | Democratic | 1996 | Incumbent re-elected. | ▌ ✓ Brad Sherman (Democratic) 65.2%; ▌Mark Reed (Republican) 34.8% |
| California 28 | D+23 | Howard Berman | Democratic | 1982 | Incumbent re-elected. | ▌ ✓ Howard Berman (Democratic) 69.5%; ▌Merlin Froyd (Republican) 22.4%; ▌Carlos Rodriguez (Libertarian) 8.1% |
| California 29 | D+14 | Adam Schiff | Democratic | 2000 | Incumbent re-elected. | ▌ ✓ Adam Schiff (Democratic) 64.8%; ▌John Colbert (Republican) 32.0%; ▌Bill Cushing (Libertarian) 3.2% |
| California 30 | D+18 | Henry Waxman | Democratic | 1974 | Incumbent re-elected. | ▌ ✓ Henry Waxman (Democratic) 64.6%; ▌Chuck Wilkerson (Republican) 31.9%; ▌Erich Miller (Libertarian) 2.1%; ▌Richard Castaldo (Peace and Freedom) 1.3% |
| California 31 | D+29 | Xavier Becerra | Democratic | 1992 | Incumbent re-elected. | ▌ ✓ Xavier Becerra (Democratic) 83.8%; ▌Stephen Smith (Republican) 16.2% |
| California 32 | D+15 | Judy Chu | Democratic | 2009 (special) | Incumbent re-elected. | ▌ ✓ Judy Chu (Democratic) 71.0%; ▌Ed Schmerling (Republican) 29.0% |
| California 33 | D+35 | Diane Watson | Democratic | 2001 (special) | Incumbent retired. Democratic hold. | ▌ ✓ Karen Bass (Democratic) 86.1%; ▌James Andion (Republican) 13.9% |
| California 34 | D+22 | Lucille Roybal-Allard | Democratic | 1992 | Incumbent re-elected. | ▌ ✓ Lucille Roybal-Allard (Democratic) 77.2%; ▌Wayne Miller (Republican) 22.8% |
| California 35 | D+31 | Maxine Waters | Democratic | 1990 | Incumbent re-elected. | ▌ ✓ Maxine Waters (Democratic) 79.3%; ▌Bruce Brown (Republican) 20.7% |
| California 36 | D+12 | Jane Harman | Democratic | 1992; 1998 (retired); 2000 | Incumbent re-elected. | ▌ ✓ Jane Harman (Democratic) 59.6%; ▌Mattie Fein (Republican) 34.7%; ▌Herb Peters (Libertarian) 5.6% |
| California 37 | D+26 | Laura Richardson | Democratic | 2007 (special) | Incumbent re-elected. | ▌ ✓ Laura Richardson (Democratic) 68.4%; ▌Star Parker (Republican) 23.2%; ▌Nick Dibs (Independent) 8.4% |
| California 38 | D+18 | Grace Napolitano | Democratic | 1998 | Incumbent re-elected. | ▌ ✓ Grace Napolitano (Democratic) 73.5%; ▌Robert Vaughn (Republican) 26.5% |
| California 39 | D+12 | Linda Sánchez | Democratic | 2002 | Incumbent re-elected. | ▌ ✓ Linda Sánchez (Democratic) 63.3%; ▌Larry Andre (Republican) 32.6%; ▌John Smith (American Independent) 4.1% |
| California 40 | R+8 | Ed Royce | Republican | 1992 | Incumbent re-elected. | ▌ ✓ Ed Royce (Republican) 66.8%; ▌Christina Avalos (Democratic) 33.2% |
| California 41 | R+10 | Jerry Lewis | Republican | 1978 | Incumbent re-elected. | ▌ ✓ Jerry Lewis (Republican) 63.2%; ▌Pat Meagher (Democratic) 36.8% |
| California 42 | R+10 | Gary Miller | Republican | 1998 | Incumbent re-elected. | ▌ ✓ Gary Miller (Republican) 62.2%; ▌Michael Williamson (Democratic) 31.9%; ▌Mark Lambert (Libertarian) 5.9% |
| California 43 | D+13 | Joe Baca | Democratic | 1999 (special) | Incumbent re-elected. | ▌ ✓ Joe Baca (Democratic) 65.5%; ▌Scott Folkens (Republican) 34.5% |
| California 44 | R+6 | Ken Calvert | Republican | 1992 | Incumbent re-elected. | ▌ ✓ Ken Calvert (Republican) 55.6%; ▌Bill Hedrick (Democratic) 44.4% |
| California 45 | R+3 | Mary Bono | Republican | 1998 | Incumbent re-elected. | ▌ ✓ Mary Bono (Republican) 51.5%; ▌Steve Pougnet (Democratic) 42.1%; ▌Bill Lussenheide (American Independent) 6.4% |
| California 46 | R+6 | Dana Rohrabacher | Republican | 1988 | Incumbent re-elected. | ▌ ✓ Dana Rohrabacher (Republican) 62.2%; ▌Ken Arnold (Democratic) 37.8% |
| California 47 | D+4 | Loretta Sanchez | Democratic | 1996 | Incumbent re-elected. | ▌ ✓ Loretta Sanchez (Democratic) 53.0%; ▌Van Tran (Republican) 39.3%; ▌Ceci Iglesias (Independent) 7.8% |
| California 48 | R+6 | John B. T. Campbell III | Republican | 2005 (special) | Incumbent re-elected. | ▌ ✓ John B. T. Campbell III (Republican) 59.9%; ▌Beth Krom (Democratic) 34.5%; ▌Mike Binkley (Libertarian) 3.6% |
| California 49 | R+10 | Darrell Issa | Republican | 2000 | Incumbent re-elected. | ▌ ✓ Darrell Issa (Republican) 62.8%; ▌Howard Katz (Democratic) 31.5%; ▌Dion Clark (American Independent) 3.5%; ▌Mike Paster (Libertarian) 2.3% |
| California 50 | R+3 | Brian Bilbray | Republican | 1994; 2000 (defeated); 2006 (special) | Incumbent re-elected. | ▌ ✓ Brian Bilbray (Republican) 56.6%; ▌Francine Busby (Democratic) 39.0%; ▌Lars Grossmith (Libertarian) 2.2%; ▌Miriam Clark (Peace and Freedom) 2.2% |
| California 51 | D+8 | Bob Filner | Democratic | 1992 | Incumbent re-elected. | ▌ ✓ Bob Filner (Democratic) 60.1%; ▌Nick Popaditch (Republican) 39.9% |
| California 52 | R+9 | Duncan D. Hunter | Republican | 2008 | Incumbent re-elected. | ▌ ✓ Duncan D. Hunter (Republican) 63.1%; ▌Ray Lutz (Democratic) 32.1%; ▌Michael Benoit (Libertarian) 4.9% |
| California 53 | D+14 | Susan Davis | Democratic | 2000 | Incumbent re-elected. | ▌ ✓ Susan Davis (Democratic) 62.3%; ▌Michael Crimmins (Republican) 34.0%; ▌Paul Dekker (Libertarian) 3.7% |

== Colorado ==
Colorado's results

| District | | Incumbent | | | Results | Candidates |
| District | Cook PVI (2008) | Member | Party | First elected | Results | Candidates |
|---|---|---|---|---|---|---|
| Colorado 1 | D+21 | Diana DeGette | Democratic | 1996 | Incumbent re-elected. | ▌ ✓ Diana DeGette (Democratic) 67.4%; ▌Mike Fallon (Republican) 28.8%; ▌Gary Swing (Green) 1.4%; ▌Clint Jones (Libertarian) 1.4%; ▌Chris Styskal (Constitution) 1.0% |
| Colorado 2 | D+11 | Jared Polis | Democratic | 2008 | Incumbent re-elected. | ▌ ✓ Jared Polis (Democratic) 57.4%; ▌Stephen Bailey (Republican) 37.9%; ▌Jenna Goss (Constitution) 2.7%; ▌Curtis Harris (Libertarian) 2.0% |
| Colorado 3 | R+5 | John Salazar | Democratic | 2004 | Incumbent lost re-election. Republican gain. | ▌ ✓ Scott Tipton (Republican) 50.1%; ▌John Salazar (Democratic) 45.8%; ▌Gregory Gilman (Libertarian) 2.2%; ▌Jake Segrest (Independent) 1.9% |
| Colorado 4 | R+6 | Betsy Markey | Democratic | 2008 | Incumbent lost re-election. Republican gain. | ▌ ✓ Cory Gardner (Republican) 52.5%; ▌Betsy Markey (Democratic) 41.4%; ▌Doug Aden (Constitution) 4.7%; ▌Ken Waskiewicz (Independent) 1.5% |
| Colorado 5 | R+14 | Doug Lamborn | Republican | 2006 | Incumbent re-elected. | ▌ ✓ Doug Lamborn (Republican) 65.8%; ▌Kevin Bradley (Democratic) 29.3%; ▌Brian Scott (Constitution) 2.5%; ▌Jerrell Klaver (Libertarian) 2.4% |
| Colorado 6 | R+8 | Mike Coffman | Republican | 2008 | Incumbent re-elected. | ▌ ✓ Mike Coffman (Republican) 65.7%; ▌John Flerlage (Democratic) 31.5%; ▌Rob McNealy (Libertarian) 2.8% |
| Colorado 7 | D+4 | Ed Perlmutter | Democratic | 2006 | Incumbent re-elected. | ▌ ✓ Ed Perlmutter (Democratic) 53.4%; ▌Ryan Frazier (Republican) 41.8%; ▌Buck Bailey (Libertarian) 4.8% |

== Connecticut ==
| District | | Incumbent | | | Results | Candidates |
| District | Cook PVI (2008) | Member | Party | First elected | Results | Candidates |
|---|---|---|---|---|---|---|
| Connecticut 1 | D+13 | John Larson | Democratic | 1998 | Incumbent re-elected. | ▌ ✓ John Larson (Democratic) 61.3%; ▌Ann Brickley (Republican) 37.2%; ▌Ken Krayeske (Green) 1.1%; ▌Chris Hutchinson (Socialist Action) 0.4% |
| Connecticut 2 | D+6 | Joe Courtney | Democratic | 2006 | Incumbent re-elected. | ▌ ✓ Joe Courtney (Democratic) 59.9%; ▌Janet Peckinpaugh (Republican) 38.8%; ▌Scott Deshefy (Green) 1.3% |
| Connecticut 3 | D+9 | Rosa DeLauro | Democratic | 1990 | Incumbent re-elected. | ▌ ✓ Rosa DeLauro (Democratic) 65.1%; ▌Larry Labriola (Republican) 33.6%; ▌Charlie Pillsbury (Green) 1.3% |
| Connecticut 4 | D+5 | Jim Himes | Democratic | 2008 | Incumbent re-elected. | ▌ ✓ Jim Himes (Democratic) 53.1%; ▌Dan Debicella (Republican) 46.9% |
| Connecticut 5 | D+2 | Chris Murphy | Democratic | 2006 | Incumbent re-elected. | ▌ ✓ Chris Murphy (Democratic) 54.1%; ▌Sam Caligiuri (Republican) 45.9% |

== Delaware ==
| District | | Incumbent | | | Results | Candidates |
| District | Cook PVI (2008) | Representative | Party | First elected | Results | Candidates |
|---|---|---|---|---|---|---|
| Delaware at-large | D+7 | Mike Castle | Republican | 1992 | Incumbent retired to run for U.S. Senator. Democratic gain. | ▌ ✓ John Carney (Democratic) 56.8%; ▌Glen Urquhart (Republican) 41.0%; ▌Earl Lofland (Independent Party) 1.2%; ▌Brent Wangen (Libertarian) 0.6%; ▌Jeff Brown (Blue Enigma) 0.4% |

== Florida ==
Florida's results

| District | | Incumbent | | | Results | Candidates |
| District | Cook PVI (2008) | Representative | Party | First elected | Results | Candidates |
|---|---|---|---|---|---|---|
| Florida 1 | R+21 | Jeff Miller | Republican | 2001 | Incumbent re-elected. | ▌ ✓ Jeff Miller (Republican) 80.0%; ▌Joe Cantrell (Independent) 10.9%; ▌John Krause (Independent) 8.6% |
| Florida 2 | R+6 | Allen Boyd | Democratic | 1996 | Incumbent lost re-election. Republican gain. | ▌ ✓ Steve Southerland (Republican) 53.6%; ▌Allen Boyd (Democratic) 41.4%; ▌Paul McKain (Independent) 2.8%; ▌Dianne Berryhill (Independent) 2.2% |
| Florida 3 | D+18 | Corrine Brown | Democratic | 1992 | Incumbent re-elected. | ▌ ✓ Corrine Brown (Democratic) 63.0%; ▌Mike Yost (Republican) 33.9%; ▌Terry Martin-Black (Independent) 3.1% |
| Florida 4 | R+17 | Ander Crenshaw | Republican | 2000 | Incumbent re-elected. | ▌ ✓ Ander Crenshaw (Republican) 77.2%; ▌Troy Stanley (Independent) 22.8% |
| Florida 5 | R+9 | Ginny Brown-Waite | Republican | 2002 | Incumbent retired. Republican hold. | ▌ ✓ Rich Nugent (Republican) 67.4%; ▌Jim Piccillo (Democratic) 32.6% |
| Florida 6 | R+10 | Cliff Stearns | Republican | 1988 | Incumbent re-elected. | ▌ ✓ Cliff Stearns (Republican) 71.5%; ▌Steve Schonberg (Independent) 28.5% |
| Florida 7 | R+7 | John Mica | Republican | 1992 | Incumbent re-elected. | ▌ ✓ John Mica (Republican) 69.0%; ▌Heather Beaven (Democratic) 31.0% |
| Florida 8 | R+2 | Alan Grayson | Democratic | 2008 | Incumbent lost re-election. Republican gain. | ▌ ✓ Daniel Webster (Republican) 56.1%; ▌Alan Grayson (Democratic) 38.2%; ▌Peg Dunmire (Tea) 3.8%; ▌George Metcalfe (Independent) 1.9% |
| Florida 9 | R+6 | Gus Bilirakis | Republican | 2006 | Incumbent re-elected. | ▌ ✓ Gus Bilirakis (Republican) 71.4%; ▌Anita de Palma (Democratic) 28.6% |
| Florida 10 | R+1 | Bill Young | Republican | 1970 | Incumbent re-elected. | ▌ ✓ Bill Young (Republican) 65.9%; ▌Charlie Justice (Democratic) 34.1% |
| Florida 11 | D+11 | Kathy Castor | Democratic | 2006 | Incumbent re-elected. | ▌ ✓ Kathy Castor (Democratic) 59.6%; ▌Mike Prendergast (Republican) 40.4% |
| Florida 12 | R+6 | Adam Putnam | Republican | 2000 | Incumbent retired to run for Florida Agriculture Commissioner. Republican hold. | ▌ ✓ Dennis A. Ross (Republican) 48.1%; ▌Lori Edwards (Democratic) 41.1%; ▌Randy Wilkinson (Tea) 10.7% |
| Florida 13 | R+6 | Vern Buchanan | Republican | 2006 | Incumbent re-elected. | ▌ ✓ Vern Buchanan (Republican) 68.9%; ▌James Golden (Democratic) 31.1% |
| Florida 14 | R+11 | Connie Mack IV | Republican | 2004 | Incumbent re-elected. | ▌ ✓ Connie Mack IV (Republican) 68.6%; ▌James Roach (Democratic) 27.1%; ▌William St. Claire (Independent) 4.3% |
| Florida 15 | R+6 | Bill Posey | Republican | 2008 | Incumbent re-elected. | ▌ ✓ Bill Posey (Republican) 64.7%; ▌Shannon Roberts (Democratic) 35.3% |
| Florida 16 | R+5 | Tom Rooney | Republican | 2008 | Incumbent re-elected. | ▌ ✓ Tom Rooney (Republican) 66.9%; ▌Jim Horn (Democratic) 33.1% |
| Florida 17 | D+34 | Kendrick Meek | Democratic | 2002 | Incumbent retired to run for U.S. Senator. Democratic hold. | ▌ ✓ Frederica Wilson (Democratic) 86.2%; ▌Roderick Vereen (Independent) 13.8% |
| Florida 18 | R+3 | Ileana Ros-Lehtinen | Republican | 1989 | Incumbent re-elected. | ▌ ✓ Ileana Ros-Lehtinen (Republican) 68.9%; ▌Rolando Banciella (Democratic) 31.1% |
| Florida 19 | D+15 | Ted Deutch | Democratic | 2010 | Incumbent re-elected. | ▌ ✓ Ted Deutch (Democratic) 62.6%; ▌Joe Budd (Republican) 37.3% |
| Florida 20 | D+13 | Debbie Wasserman Schultz | Democratic | 2004 | Incumbent re-elected. | ▌ ✓ Debbie Wasserman Schultz (Democratic) 60.2%; ▌Karen Harrington (Republican) 38.1%; ▌Stanley Blumenthal (Independent) 1.0%; ▌Bob Kunst (Independent) 0.8% |
| Florida 21 | R+5 | Lincoln Diaz-Balart | Republican | 1992 | Incumbent retired. Republican hold. | ▌ ✓ Mario Díaz-Balart (Republican); Uncontested |
| Florida 22 | D+1 | Ron Klein | Democratic | 2006 | Incumbent lost re-election. Republican gain. | ▌ ✓ Allen West (Republican) 54.4%; ▌Ron Klein (Democratic) 45.6% |
| Florida 23 | D+28 | Alcee Hastings | Democratic | 1992 | Incumbent re-elected. | ▌ ✓ Alcee Hastings (Democratic) 79.1%; ▌Bernard Sansaricq (Republican) 20.9% |
| Florida 24 | R+4 | Suzanne Kosmas | Democratic | 2008 | Incumbent lost re-election. Republican gain. | ▌ ✓ Sandy Adams (Republican) 59.6%; ▌ Suzanne Kosmas (Democratic) 40.3% |
| Florida 25 | R+5 | Mario Díaz-Balart | Republican | 2002 | Open seat, incumbent ran in 21st District; Republican hold. | ▌ ✓ David Rivera (Republican) 52.2%; ▌Joe Garcia (Democratic) 42.6%; ▌Roly Arroyo (Tea) 3.0%; ▌Craig Porter (Florida Whig) 2.2% |

== Georgia ==
Georgia's results

| District | | Incumbent | | | Results | Candidates |
| District | Cook PVI (2008) | Representative | Party | First elected | Results | Candidates |
|---|---|---|---|---|---|---|
| Georgia 1 | R+16 | Jack Kingston | Republican | 1992 | Incumbent re-elected. | ▌ ✓ Jack Kingston (Republican) 71.6%; ▌Oscar Harris (Democratic) 28.4% |
| Georgia 2 | D+1 | Sanford Bishop | Democratic | 1992 | Incumbent re-elected. | ▌ ✓ Sanford Bishop (Democratic) 51.4%; ▌Mike Keown (Republican) 48.6% |
| Georgia 3 | R+19 | Lynn Westmoreland | Republican | 2004 | Incumbent re-elected. | ▌ ✓ Lynn Westmoreland (Republican) 69.5%; ▌Frank Saunders (Democratic) 30.5% |
| Georgia 4 | D+24 | Hank Johnson | Democratic | 2006 | Incumbent re-elected. | ▌ ✓ Hank Johnson (Democratic) 74.7%; ▌Liz Carter (Republican) 25.3% |
| Georgia 5 | D+26 | John Lewis | Democratic | 1986 | Incumbent re-elected. | ▌ ✓ John Lewis (Democratic) 73.7%; ▌Fenn Little (Republican) 26.3% |
| Georgia 6 | R+19 | Tom Price | Republican | 2004 | Incumbent re-elected. | ▌ ✓ Tom Price (Republican) 99.9% |
| Georgia 7 | R+16 | John Linder | Republican | 1992 | Incumbent retired. Republican hold. | ▌ ✓ Rob Woodall (Republican) 67.1%; ▌Doug Heckman (Democratic) 32.9% |
| Georgia 8 | R+10 | Jim Marshall | Democratic | 2002 | Incumbent lost re-election. Republican gain. | ▌ ✓ Austin Scott (Republican) 52.7%; ▌Jim Marshall (Democratic) 47.3% |
| Georgia 9 | R+28 | Tom Graves | Republican | 2010 (special) | Incumbent re-elected. | ▌ ✓ Tom Graves (Republican) 100% |
| Georgia 10 | R+15 | Paul Broun | Republican | 2007 (special) | Incumbent re-elected. | ▌ ✓ Paul Broun (Republican) 67.4%; ▌Russell Edwards (Democratic) 32.6% |
| Georgia 11 | R+20 | Phil Gingrey | Republican | 2002 | Incumbent re-elected. | ▌ ✓ Phil Gingrey (Republican) 100% |
| Georgia 12 | D+1 | John Barrow | Democratic | 2004 | Incumbent re-elected. | ▌ ✓ John Barrow (Democratic) 56.6%; ▌Ray McKinney (Republican) 43.4% |
| Georgia 13 | D+15 | David Scott | Democratic | 2002 | Incumbent re-elected. | ▌ ✓ David Scott (Democratic) 69.4%; ▌Mike Crane (Republican) 30.6% |

== Hawaii ==
Hawaii's results

| District | | Incumbent | | | Results | Candidates |
| District | Cook PVI (2008) | Representative | Party | First elected | Results | Candidates |
|---|---|---|---|---|---|---|
| Hawaii 1 | D+11 | Charles Djou | Republican | 2010 (special) | Incumbent lost re-election. Democratic gain. | ▌ ✓ Colleen Hanabusa (Democratic) 53.2%; ▌Charles Djou (Republican) 46.8% |
| Hawaii 2 | D+14 | Mazie Hirono | Democratic | 2006 | Incumbent re-elected. | ▌ ✓ Mazie Hirono (Democratic) 72.2%; ▌John Willoughby (Republican) 25.3%; ▌Patric Brock (Libertarian) 1.8%; ▌Andrew Von Sonn (Independent) 0.7% |

== Idaho ==
Idaho's results

| District | | Incumbent | | | Results | Candidates |
| District | Cook PVI (2008) | Representative | Party | First elected | Results | Candidates |
|---|---|---|---|---|---|---|
| Idaho 1 | R+18 | Walt Minnick | Democratic | 2008 | Incumbent lost re-election. Republican gain. | ▌ ✓ Raúl Labrador (Republican) 51.0%; ▌Walt Minnick (Democratic) 41.3%; ▌Dave Olson (Independent) 5.8%; ▌Mike Washburn (Libertarian) 1.9% |
| Idaho 2 | R+17 | Mike Simpson | Republican | 1998 | Incumbent re-elected. | ▌ ✓ Mike Simpson (Republican) 68.8%; ▌Mike Crawford (Democratic) 24.4%; ▌Brian Schad (Independent) 6.8% |

== Illinois ==
Illinois's results

| District | | Incumbent | | | Results | Candidates |
| District | Cook PVI (2008) | Representative | Party | First elected | Results | Candidates |
|---|---|---|---|---|---|---|
| Illinois 1 | D+34 | Bobby Rush | Democratic | 1992 | Incumbent re-elected. | ▌ ✓ Bobby Rush (Democratic) 80.3%; ▌Ray Wardingley (Republican) 15.9%; ▌Jeff Adams (Green) 3.8% |
| Illinois 2 | D+36 | Jesse Jackson Jr. | Democratic | 1995 (special) | Incumbent re-elected. | ▌ ✓ Jesse Jackson Jr. (Democratic) 80.5%; ▌Isaac C. Hayes (Republican) 13.8%; ▌Anthony Williams (Green) 5.7% |
| Illinois 3 | D+11 | Dan Lipinski | Democratic | 2004 | Incumbent re-elected. | ▌ ✓ Dan Lipinski (Democratic) 69.7%; ▌Michael Bendas (Republican) 24.3%; ▌Laurel Lambert Schmidt (Green) 6.0% |
| Illinois 4 | D+32 | Luis Gutiérrez | Democratic | 1992 | Incumbent re-elected. | ▌ ✓ Luis Gutiérrez (Democratic) 77.4%; ▌Israel Vázquez (Republican) 14.3%; ▌Bob Burns (Green) 8.3% |
| Illinois 5 | D+19 | Mike Quigley | Democratic | 2009 (special) | Incumbent re-elected. | ▌ ✓ Mike Quigley (Democratic) 70.6%; ▌David Ratowitz (Republican) 25.4%; ▌Matt Reichel (Green) 4.0% |
| Illinois 6 | Even | Peter Roskam | Republican | 2006 | Incumbent re-elected. | ▌ ✓ Peter Roskam (Republican) 63.7%; ▌Ben Lowe (Democratic) 36.3% |
| Illinois 7 | D+35 | Danny K. Davis | Democratic | 1996 | Incumbent re-elected. | ▌ ✓ Danny K. Davis (Democratic) 81.5%; ▌Mark Weiman (Republican) 16.1%; ▌Clarence Clemons (Independent) 2.4% |
| Illinois 8 | R+1 | Melissa Bean | Democratic | 2004 | Incumbent lost re-election. Republican gain. | ▌ ✓ Joe Walsh (Republican) 48.5%; ▌Melissa Bean (Democratic) 48.3%; ▌Bill Scheurer (Green) 3.2% |
| Illinois 9 | D+20 | Jan Schakowsky | Democratic | 1998 | Incumbent re-elected. | ▌ ✓ Jan Schakowsky (Democratic) 66.3%; ▌Joel Pollak (Republican) 31.1%; ▌Simon Ribeiro (Green) 2.5% |
| Illinois 10 | D+6 | Mark Kirk | Republican | 2000 | Incumbent retired to run for U.S. Senator. Republican hold. | ▌ ✓ Bob Dold (Republican) 51.1%; ▌Dan Seals (Democratic) 48.9% |
| Illinois 11 | R+1 | Debbie Halvorson | Democratic | 2008 | Incumbent lost re-election. Republican gain. | ▌ ✓ Adam Kinzinger (Republican) 57.4%; ▌Debbie Halvorson (Democratic) 42.6% |
| Illinois 12 | D+3 | Jerry Costello | Democratic | 1988 | Incumbent re-elected. | ▌ ✓ Jerry Costello (Democratic) 59.8%; ▌Teri Newman (Republican) 36.5%; ▌Rodger Jennings (Green) 3.6% |
| Illinois 13 | R+1 | Judy Biggert | Republican | 1998 | Incumbent re-elected. | ▌ ✓ Judy Biggert (Republican) 63.8%; ▌Scott Harper (Democratic) 36.2% |
| Illinois 14 | R+1 | Bill Foster | Democratic | 2008 | Incumbent lost re-election. Republican gain. | ▌ ✓ Randy Hultgren (Republican) 51.3%; ▌Bill Foster (Democratic) 45.0%; ▌Dan Kairis (Green) 3.6% |
| Illinois 15 | R+6 | Tim Johnson | Republican | 2000 | Incumbent re-elected. | ▌ ✓ Tim Johnson (Republican) 64.3%; ▌David Gill (Democratic) 35.7% |
| Illinois 16 | R+2 | Donald Manzullo | Republican | 1992 | Incumbent re-elected. | ▌ ✓ Donald Manzullo (Republican) 65.0%; ▌George Gaulrapp (Democratic) 31.0%; ▌Terry Campbell (Green) 4.0% |
| Illinois 17 | D+3 | Phil Hare | Democratic | 2006 | Incumbent lost re-election. Republican gain. | ▌ ✓ Bobby Schilling (Republican) 52.6%; ▌Phil Hare (Democratic) 43.0%; ▌Roger Davis (Green) 4.4% |
| Illinois 18 | R+6 | Aaron Schock | Republican | 2008 | Incumbent re-elected. | ▌ ✓ Aaron Schock (Republican) 69.1%; ▌D. K. Hirner (Democratic) 25.8%; ▌Sheldon Schafer (Green) 5.1% |
| Illinois 19 | R+9 | John Shimkus | Republican | 1996 | Incumbent re-elected. | ▌ ✓ John Shimkus (Republican) 71.2%; ▌Tim Bagwell (Democratic) 28.8% |

== Indiana ==
Indiana's results

| District | | Incumbent | | | Results | Candidates |
| District | Cook PVI (2008) | Representative | Party | First elected | Results | Candidates |
|---|---|---|---|---|---|---|
| Indiana 1 | D+8 | Pete Visclosky | Democratic | 1984 | Incumbent re-elected. | ▌ ✓ Pete Visclosky (Democratic) 58.6%; ▌Mark Leyva (Republican) 38.6%; ▌Jon Morris (Libertarian) 2.8% |
| Indiana 2 | R+2 | Joe Donnelly | Democratic | 2006 | Incumbent re-elected. | ▌ ✓ Joe Donnelly (Democratic) 48.2%; ▌Jackie Walorski (Republican) 46.8%; ▌Mark Vogel (Libertarian) 5.0% |
| Indiana 3 | R+14 | Vacant | | | Mark Souder (R) resigned May 18, 2010. Republican hold. Winner also elected to fill unexpired term; see above. | ▌ ✓ Marlin Stutzman (Republican) 62.8%; ▌Tom Hayhurst (Democratic) 33.1%; ▌Scott Wise (Libertarian) 4.1% |
| Indiana 4 | R+14 | Steve Buyer | Republican | 1992 | Incumbent retired. Republican hold. | ▌ ✓ Todd Rokita (Republican) 68.6%; ▌David Sanders (Democratic) 26.3%; ▌John Duncan (Libertarian) 5.1% |
| Indiana 5 | R+17 | Dan Burton | Republican | 1982 | Incumbent re-elected. | ▌ ✓ Dan Burton (Republican) 62.1%; ▌Tim Crawford (Democratic) 25.4%; ▌Richard Reid (Libertarian) 7.8%; ▌Jesse Trueblood (Independent) 4.8% |
| Indiana 6 | R+10 | Mike Pence | Republican | 2000 | Incumbent re-elected. | ▌ ✓ Mike Pence (Republican) 66.6%; ▌Barry Welsh (Democratic) 29.9%; ▌T. J. Thompson (Libertarian) 3.5% |
| Indiana 7 | D+14 | André Carson | Democratic | 2008 | Incumbent re-elected. | ▌ ✓ André Carson (Democratic) 58.9%; ▌Marvin Scott (Republican) 37.8%; ▌Dav Wilson (Libertarian) 3.3% |
| Indiana 8 | R+8 | Brad Ellsworth | Democratic | 2006 | Incumbent retired to run for U.S. Senator. Republican gain. | ▌ ✓ Larry Bucshon (Republican) 57.6%; ▌Trent VanHaaften (Democratic) 37.4%; ▌John Cunningham (Libertarian) 5.0% |
| Indiana 9 | R+6 | Baron Hill | Democratic | 1998; 2004 (defeated); 2006 | Incumbent lost re-election. Republican gain. | ▌ ✓ Todd Young (Republican) 52.3%; ▌Baron Hill (Democratic) 42.3%; ▌Greg Knott (Libertarian) 5.4% |

== Iowa ==
Iowa's results

| District | | Incumbent | | | Results | Candidates |
| District | Cook PVI (2008) | Representative | Party | First elected | Results | Candidates |
|---|---|---|---|---|---|---|
| Iowa 1 | D+5 | Bruce Braley | Democratic | 2006 | Incumbent re-elected. | ▌ ✓ Bruce Braley (Democratic) 49.5%; ▌Benjamin Lange (Republican) 47.5%; ▌Rob Petsche (Libertarian) 1.9%; ▌Jason Faulkner (Independent) 1.0% |
| Iowa 2 | D+7 | Dave Loebsack | Democratic | 2006 | Incumbent re-elected. | ▌ ✓ Dave Loebsack (Democratic) 51.0%; ▌Mariannette Miller-Meeks (Republican) 45.9%; ▌Gary Sicard (Libertarian) 1.9%; ▌Jon Tack (Constitution) 1.1% |
| Iowa 3 | D+1 | Leonard Boswell | Democratic | 1996 | Incumbent re-elected. | ▌ ✓ Leonard Boswell (Democratic) 50.7%; ▌Brad Zaun (Republican) 46.5%; ▌Rebecca Williamson (Socialist Workers) 2.6% |
| Iowa 4 | EVEN | Tom Latham | Republican | 1994 | Incumbent re-elected. | ▌ ✓ Tom Latham (Republican) 65.6%; ▌Bill Maske (Democratic) 32.0%; ▌Dan Lensing (Independent) 2.4% |
| Iowa 5 | R+9 | Steve King | Republican | 2002 | Incumbent re-elected. | ▌ ✓ Steve King (Republican) 65.8%; ▌Matt Campbell (Democratic) 32.3%; ▌Martin Monroe (Independent) 1.9% |

== Kansas ==
Kansas's results

| District | | Incumbent | | | Results | Candidates |
| District | Cook PVI (2008) | Representative | Party | First elected | Results | Candidates |
|---|---|---|---|---|---|---|
| Kansas 1 | R+23 | Jerry Moran | Republican | 1996 | Incumbent retired to run for U.S. Senator. Republican hold. | ▌ ✓ Tim Huelskamp (Republican) 73.7%; ▌Alan Jilka (Democratic) 22.8%; ▌Jack Warner (Libertarian) 3.3% |
| Kansas 2 | R+9 | Lynn Jenkins | Republican | 2008 | Incumbent re-elected. | ▌ ✓ Lynn Jenkins (Republican) 63.1%; ▌Cheryl Hudspeth (Democratic) 32.3%; ▌Robert Garrard (Libertarian) 4.5% |
| Kansas 3 | R+3 | Dennis Moore | Democratic | 1998 | Incumbent retired. Republican gain. | ▌ ✓ Kevin Yoder (Republican) 58.4%; ▌Stephene Moore (Democratic) 38.6%; ▌Jasmin Talbert (Libertarian) 2.9% |
| Kansas 4 | R+14 | Todd Tiahrt | Republican | 1994 | Incumbent retired to run for U.S. Senator. Republican hold. | ▌ ✓ Mike Pompeo (Republican) 58.7%; ▌Raj Goyle (Democratic) 36.4%; ▌Susan Ducey (Reform) 2.4%; ▌Shawn Smith (Libertarian) 2.2% |

== Kentucky ==
Kentucky's results

| District | | Incumbent | | | Results | Candidates |
| District | Cook PVI (2008) | Representative | Party | First elected | Results | Candidates |
|---|---|---|---|---|---|---|
| Kentucky 1 | R+15 | Ed Whitfield | Republican | 1994 | Incumbent re-elected. | ▌ ✓ Ed Whitfield (Republican) 71.2%; ▌Charles Hatchett (Democratic) 28.8% |
| Kentucky 2 | R+15 | Brett Guthrie | Republican | 2008 | Incumbent re-elected. | ▌ ✓ Brett Guthrie (Republican) 67.9%; ▌Ed Marksberry (Democratic) 32.1% |
| Kentucky 3 | D+2 | John Yarmuth | Democratic | 2006 | Incumbent re-elected. | ▌ ✓ John Yarmuth (Democratic) 54.7%; ▌Todd Lally (Republican) 44.0%; ▌Edward Martin (Libertarian) 0.8%; ▌Michael Hansen (Independent) 0.5% |
| Kentucky 4 | R+14 | Geoff Davis | Republican | 2004 | Incumbent re-elected. | ▌ ✓ Geoff Davis (Republican) 69.5%; ▌John Waltz (Democratic) 30.5% |
| Kentucky 5 | R+16 | Hal Rogers | Republican | 1980 | Incumbent re-elected. | ▌ ✓ Hal Rogers (Republican) 77.4%; ▌Jim Holbert (Democratic) 22.6% |
| Kentucky 6 | R+9 | Ben Chandler | Democratic | 2004 | Incumbent re-elected. | ▌ ✓ Ben Chandler (Democratic) 50.1%; ▌Andy Barr (Republican) 49.8% |

== Louisiana ==
Louisiana's results

| District | | Incumbent | | | Results | Candidates |
| District | Cook PVI (2008) | Representative | Party | First elected | Results | Candidates |
|---|---|---|---|---|---|---|
| Louisiana 1 | R+24 | Steve Scalise | Republican | 2008 | Incumbent re-elected. | ▌ ✓ Steve Scalise (Republican) 78.5%; ▌Myron Katz (Democratic) 19.2%; ▌Arden Wells (Independent) 2.3% |
| Louisiana 2 | D+25 | Joseph Cao | Republican | 2008 | Incumbent lost re-election. Democratic gain. | ▌ ✓ Cedric Richmond (Democratic) 64.6%; ▌Joseph Cao (Republican) 33.5%; ▌Anthony Marquize (Independent) 1.4%; ▌Jack Radosta (Independent) 0.5% |
| Louisiana 3 | R+12 | Charlie Melançon | Democratic | 2004 | Incumbent retired to run for U.S. Senator. Republican gain. | ▌ ✓ Jeff Landry (Republican) 63.8%; ▌Ravi Sangisetty (Democratic) 36.2% |
| Louisiana 4 | R+11 | John C. Fleming | Republican | 2008 | Incumbent re-elected. | ▌ ✓ John C. Fleming (Republican) 62.3%; ▌David Melville (Democratic) 32.4%; ▌Artis Cash (Independent) 5.3% |
| Louisiana 5 | R+14 | Rodney Alexander | Republican | 2002 (Note: Alexander was first elected as a Democrat. He became a Republican in August 2004.) | Incumbent re-elected. | ▌ ✓ Rodney Alexander (Republican) 78.6%; ▌Tom Gibbs (Independent) 21.4% |
| Louisiana 6 | R+10 | Bill Cassidy | Republican | 2008 | Incumbent re-elected. | ▌ ✓ Bill Cassidy (Republican) 65.6%; ▌Merritt McDonald (Democratic) 34.4% |
| Louisiana 7 | R+14 | Charles Boustany | Republican | 2004 | Incumbent re-elected. | ▌ ✓ Charles Boustany (Republican); Uncontested |

== Maine ==
Maine's results

| District | | Incumbent | | | Results | Candidates |
| District | Cook PVI (2008) | Representative | Party | First elected | Results | Candidates |
|---|---|---|---|---|---|---|
| Maine 1 | D+8 | Chellie Pingree | Democratic | 2008 | Incumbent re-elected. | ▌ ✓ Chellie Pingree (Democratic) 56.8%; ▌Dean Scontras (Republican) 43.2% |
| Maine 2 | D+3 | Mike Michaud | Democratic | 2002 | Incumbent re-elected. | ▌ ✓ Mike Michaud (Democratic) 55.1%; ▌Jason Levesque (Republican) 44.9% |

== Maryland ==
| District | | Incumbent | | | Results | Candidates |
| District | Cook PVI (2008) | Representative | Party | First elected | Results | Candidates |
|---|---|---|---|---|---|---|
| Maryland 1 | R+13 | Frank Kratovil | Democratic | 2008 | Incumbent lost re-election. Republican gain. | ▌ ✓ Andrew P. Harris (Republican) 54.1%; ▌Frank Kratovil (Democratic) 42.0%; ▌Richard Davis (Libertarian) 3.8% |
| Maryland 2 | D+7 | Dutch Ruppersberger | Democratic | 2002 | Incumbent re-elected. | ▌ ✓ Dutch Ruppersberger (Democratic) 64.2%; ▌Marcello Cardarelli (Republican) 33.3%; ▌Lorenzo Gaztanaga (Libertarian) 2.4% |
| Maryland 3 | D+6 | John Sarbanes | Democratic | 2006 | Incumbent re-elected. | ▌ ✓ John Sarbanes (Democratic) 61.1%; ▌Jim Wilhelm (Republican) 36.0%; ▌Jerry McKinley (Libertarian) 2.2%; ▌Alain Lareau (Constitution) 0.7% |
| Maryland 4 | D+31 | Donna Edwards | Democratic | 2008 | Incumbent re-elected. | ▌ ✓ Donna Edwards (Democratic) 83.4%; ▌Robert Broadus (Republican) 16.4% |
| Maryland 5 | D+11 | Steny Hoyer | Democratic | 1981 (special) | Incumbent re-elected. | ▌ ✓ Steny Hoyer (Democratic) 64.3%; ▌Charles Lollar (Republican) 34.6%; ▌Gavin Shickle (Libertarian) 1.1% |
| Maryland 6 | R+13 | Roscoe Bartlett | Republican | 1992 | Incumbent re-elected. | ▌ ✓ Roscoe Bartlett (Republican) 61.5%; ▌Andrew Duck (Democratic) 33.2%; ▌Dan Massey (Libertarian) 2.8%; ▌Michael Reed (Constitution) 2.4% |
| Maryland 7 | D+25 | Elijah Cummings | Democratic | 1996 | Incumbent re-elected. | ▌ ✓ Elijah Cummings (Democratic) 75.2%; ▌Frank Mirable (Republican) 22.8%; ▌Scott Spencer (Libertarian) 1.9% |
| Maryland 8 | D+21 | Chris Van Hollen | Democratic | 2002 | Incumbent re-elected. | ▌ ✓ Chris Van Hollen (Democratic) 73.3%; ▌Michael Lee Philips (Republican) 25.0%; ▌Mark Grannis (Libertarian) 1.3%; ▌Fred Nordhorn (Constitution) 0.3% |

== Massachusetts ==
Massachusetts's results

| District | | Incumbent | | | Results | Candidates |
| District | Cook PVI (2008) | Representative | Party | First elected | Results | Candidates |
|---|---|---|---|---|---|---|
| Massachusetts 1 | D+14 | John Olver | Democratic | 1991 | Incumbent re-elected. | ▌ ✓ John Olver (Democratic) 60.0%; ▌William Gunn (Republican) 34.9%; ▌Michael Engel (Independent) 5.1% |
| Massachusetts 2 | D+9 | Richard Neal | Democratic | 1988 | Incumbent re-elected. | ▌ ✓ Richard Neal (Democratic) 57.4%; ▌Thomas Wesley (Republican) 42.6% |
| Massachusetts 3 | D+9 | Jim McGovern | Democratic | 1996 | Incumbent re-elected. | ▌ ✓ Jim McGovern (Democratic) 56.5%; ▌Martin Lamb (Republican) 39.2%; ▌Patrick Barron (Independent) 4.3% |
| Massachusetts 4 | D+14 | Barney Frank | Democratic | 1980 | Incumbent re-elected. | ▌ ✓ Barney Frank (Democratic) 53.9%; ▌Sean Bielat (Republican) 43.4%; ▌Susan Allen (Independent) 1.5%; ▌Donald Jordan (Independent) 1.2% |
| Massachusetts 5 | D+8 | Niki Tsongas | Democratic | 2007 (special) | Incumbent re-elected. | ▌ ✓ Niki Tsongas (Democratic) 54.9%; ▌Jonathan Golnik (Republican) 42.3%; ▌Dale Brown (Independent) 2.0%; ▌Robert Clark (Independent) 0.9% |
| Massachusetts 6 | D+7 | John F. Tierney | Democratic | 1996 | Incumbent re-elected. | ▌ ✓ John F. Tierney (Democratic) 56.9%; ▌Bill Hudak (Republican) 43.1% |
| Massachusetts 7 | D+15 | Ed Markey | Democratic | 1976 | Incumbent re-elected. | ▌ ✓ Ed Markey (Democratic) 66.5%; ▌Gerry Dembrowski (Republican) 33.5% |
| Massachusetts 8 | D+32 | Mike Capuano | Democratic | 1998 | Incumbent re-elected. | ▌ ✓ Mike Capuano (Democratic); Uncontested |
| Massachusetts 9 | D+11 | Stephen Lynch | Democratic | 2001 (special) | Incumbent re-elected. | ▌ ✓ Stephen Lynch (Democratic) 68.4%; ▌Vernon Harrison (Republican) 26.1%; ▌Philip Dunkelbarger (Independent) 5.6% |
| Massachusetts 10 | D+5 | Bill Delahunt | Democratic | 1996 | Incumbent retired. Democratic hold. | ▌ ✓ William R. Keating (Democratic) 46.9%; ▌Jeff Perry (Republican) 42.4%; ▌Maryanne Lewis (Independent) 5.9%; ▌James Sheets (Independent) 3.7%; ▌Joe Van Nes (Independent) 1.1% |

== Michigan ==
Michigan's results

| District | | Incumbent | | | Results | Candidates |
| District | Cook PVI (2008) | Representative | Party | First elected | Results | Candidates |
|---|---|---|---|---|---|---|
| Michigan 1 | R+3 | Bart Stupak | Democratic | 1992 | Incumbent retired. Republican gain. | ▌ ✓ Dan Benishek (Republican) 51.9%; ▌Gary McDowell (Democratic) 40.9%; ▌Glenn Wilson (Independent) 3.4%; ▌Pat Lambert (US Taxpayers) 1.8%; ▌Keith Shelton (Libertarian) 1.1%; ▌Ellis Boal (Green) 0.9% |
| Michigan 2 | R+7 | Pete Hoekstra | Republican | 1992 | Incumbent retired to run for Governor of Michigan. Republican hold. | ▌ ✓ Bill Huizenga (Republican) 65.3%; ▌Fred Johnson (Democratic) 31.6%; ▌Jay Gillotte (Libertarian) 1.2%; ▌Ronald Graeser (US Taxpayers) 1.0%; ▌Lloyd Clarke (Green) 0.9% |
| Michigan 3 | R+6 | Vern Ehlers | Republican | 1993 (special) | Incumbent retired. Republican hold. | ▌ ✓ Justin Amash (Republican) 59.7%; ▌Pat Miles (Democratic) 37.5%; ▌James Rogers (Libertarian) 1.2%; Others: ▌Ted Gerrard (US Taxpayers) 1.0%; ▌Charlie Shick (Green) 0.7% |
| Michigan 4 | R+3 | Dave Camp | Republican | 1990 | Incumbent re-elected. | ▌ ✓ Dave Camp (Republican) 66.2%; ▌Jerry Campbell (Democratic) 30.5%; ▌John Emerick (US Taxpayers) 1.7%; ▌Clint Foster (Libertarian) 1.6% |
| Michigan 5 | D+11 | Dale Kildee | Democratic | 1976 | Incumbent re-elected. | ▌ ✓ Dale Kildee (Democratic) 53.0%; ▌John Kuipec (Republican) 44.3%; ▌Matt de Heus (Green) 1.3%; ▌Michael Moon (Libertarian) 1.3% |
| Michigan 6 | EVEN | Fred Upton | Republican | 1986 | Incumbent re-elected. | ▌ ✓ Fred Upton (Republican) 62.0%; ▌Don Cooney (Democratic) 33.6%; ▌Mel Vaulkner (US Taxpayers) 1.8%; ▌Fred Strand (Libertarian) 1.7%; ▌Pat Foster (Green) 0.9% |
| Michigan 7 | R+2 | Mark Schauer | Democratic | 2008 | Incumbent lost re-election. Republican gain. | ▌ ✓ Tim Walberg (Republican) 50.2%; ▌Mark Schauer (Democratic) 45.4%; ▌Scott Aughney (Independent) 1.6%; ▌Greg Merle (Libertarian) 1.4%; ▌Richard Wunsch (Green) 1.4% |
| Michigan 8 | R+2 | Mike Rogers | Republican | 2000 | Incumbent re-elected. | ▌ ✓ Mike Rogers (Republican) 64.1%; ▌Lance Enderle (Democratic) 34.3%; ▌Bob Dashairya (Libertarian) 1.6% |
| Michigan 9 | D+2 | Gary Peters | Democratic | 2008 | Incumbent re-elected. | ▌ ✓ Gary Peters (Democratic) 49.8%; ▌Rocky Raczkowski (Republican) 47.2%; ▌Adam Goodman (Libertarian) 1.0%; Others: ▌Douglas Campbell (Green) 1.0%; ▌Bob Gray (Independent) 0.7%; ▌Matthew Kuofie (Independent) 0.3% |
| Michigan 10 | R+5 | Candice S. Miller | Republican | 2002 | Incumbent re-elected. | ▌ ✓ Candice Miller (Republican) 72.0%; ▌Henry Yanez (Democratic) 25.0%; ▌Claude Beavers (Libertarian) 1.6%; ▌Candace Caveny (Green) 1.4% |
| Michigan 11 | EVEN | Thad McCotter | Republican | 2002 | Incumbent re-elected. | ▌ ✓ Thad McCotter (Republican) 59.3%; ▌Natalie Mosher (Democratic) 38.5%; ▌John Tatar (Libertarian) 2.2% |
| Michigan 12 | D+12 | Sander Levin | Democratic | 1982 | Incumbent re-elected. | ▌ ✓ Sander Levin (Democratic) 61.1%; ▌Don Volaric (Republican) 35.0%; ▌Julia Williams (Green) 1.5%; ▌Leonard Schwartz (Libertarian) 1.1%; ▌Les Townsend (US Taxpayers) 1.1%; ▌Alan Jacquemotte (Independent) 0.2% |
| Michigan 13 | D+31 | Carolyn Cheeks Kilpatrick | Democratic | 1996 | Incumbent lost renomination. Democratic hold. | ▌ ✓ Hansen Clarke (Democratic) 79.4%; ▌John Hauler (Republican) 18.5%; Others: ▌George Corsetti (Green) 0.8%; ▌Duane Montgomery (Independent) 0.7%; ▌Heidi Peterson (Libertarian) 0.6% |
| Michigan 14 | D+34 | John Conyers | Democratic | 1964 | Incumbent re-elected. | ▌ ✓ John Conyers (Democratic) 76.8%; ▌Don Ukrainec (Republican) 19.9%; ▌Marc Sosnowski (US Taxpayers) 2.1%; ▌Rick Secula (Libertarian) 1.2% |
| Michigan 15 | D+13 | John Dingell | Democratic | 1955 (special) | Incumbent re-elected. | ▌ ✓ John Dingell (Democratic) 56.8%; ▌Rob Steele (Republican) 40.1%; ▌Aimee Smith (Green) 1.3%; Others: ▌Kerry Morgan (Libertarian) 0.9%; ▌Matt Furman (US Taxpayers) 0.9% |

== Minnesota ==
| District | | Incumbent | | | Results | Candidates |
| District | Cook PVI (2008) | Representative | Party | First elected | Results | Candidates |
|---|---|---|---|---|---|---|
| Minnesota 1 | R+1 | Tim Walz | DFL | 2006 | Incumbent re-elected. | ▌ ✓ Tim Walz (DFL) 49.3%; ▌Randy Demmer (Republican) 44.1%; ▌Steven Wilson (Independence) 5.3%; ▌Lars Johnson (Independent) 1.2% |
| Minnesota 2 | R+4 | John Kline | Republican | 2002 | Incumbent re-elected. | ▌ ✓ John Kline (Republican) 63.3%; ▌Shelley Madore (DFL) 36.6% |
| Minnesota 3 | EVEN | Erik Paulsen | Republican | 2008 | Incumbent re-elected. | ▌ ✓ Erik Paulsen (Republican) 58.8%; ▌Jim Meffert (DFL) 36.6%; ▌Jon Oleson (Independence) 4.6% |
| Minnesota 4 | D+13 | Betty McCollum | DFL | 2000 | Incumbent re-elected. | ▌ ✓ Betty McCollum (DFL) 59.1%; ▌Teresa Collett (Republican) 34.6%; ▌Steve Carlson (Independence) 6.1% |
| Minnesota 5 | D+23 | Keith Ellison | DFL | 2006 | Incumbent re-elected. | ▌ ✓ Keith Ellison (DFL) 67.7%; ▌Alexander Demos (Republican) 24.1%; ▌Lynn Torgerson (Independent) 3.7%; ▌Tom Schrunk (Independence) 3.3%; ▌Michael Cavlan (Independent) 1.1% |
| Minnesota 6 | R+7 | Michele Bachmann | Republican | 2006 | Incumbent re-elected. | ▌ ✓ Michele Bachmann (Republican) 52.5%; ▌Tarryl Clark (DFL) 39.8%; ▌Bob Anderson (Independence) 5.8%; ▌Aubrey Immelman (Independent) 1.8% |
| Minnesota 7 | R+5 | Collin Peterson | DFL | 1990 | Incumbent re-elected. | ▌ ✓ Collin Peterson (DFL) 55.2%; ▌Lee Byberg (Republican) 37.6%; ▌Gene Waldorf (Independent) 3.9%; ▌Glen Menze (Independence) 3.3% |
| Minnesota 8 | D+3 | Jim Oberstar | DFL | 1974 | Incumbent lost re-election. Republican gain. | ▌ ✓ Chip Cravaack (Republican) 48.2%; ▌Jim Oberstar (DFL) 46.6%; ▌Tim Olson (Independence) 4.3%; ▌George Burton (Constitution) 0.9% |

== Mississippi ==
| District | | Incumbent | | | Results | Candidates |
| District | Cook PVI (2008) | Representative | Party | First elected | Results | Candidates |
|---|---|---|---|---|---|---|
| Mississippi 1 | R+14 | Travis Childers | Democratic | 2008 (special) | Incumbent lost re-election. Republican gain. | ▌ ✓ Alan Nunnelee (Republican) 55.3%; ▌Travis Childers (Democratic) 40.8%; ▌Wally Pang (Independent) 1.0%; Others: ▌Les Green (Independent) 0.9%; ▌A. G. Baddley (Independent) 0.9%; ▌Gail Giaranita (Constitution) 0.6%; ▌Rico Hoskins (Independent) 0.2%; ▌Harold Taylor (Libertarian) 0.2%; ▌Barbara Washer (Reform) 0.2% |
| Mississippi 2 | D+12 | Bennie Thompson | Democratic | 1993 (special) | Incumbent re-elected. | ▌ ✓ Bennie Thompson (Democratic) 61.5%; ▌Bill Marcy (Republican) 37.6%; ▌Ashley Norwood (Reform) 0.9% |
| Mississippi 3 | R+15 | Gregg Harper | Republican | 2008 | Incumbent re-elected. | ▌ ✓ Gregg Harper (Republican) 68.0%; ▌Joel Gill (Democratic) 31.2%; ▌Tracella Lou O'Hara Hill (Reform) 0.8% |
| Mississippi 4 | R+20 | Gene Taylor | Democratic | 1989 (special) | Incumbent lost re-election. Republican gain. | ▌ ✓ Steven Palazzo (Republican) 51.9%; ▌Gene Taylor (Democratic) 46.8%; Others: ▌Tim Hampton (Libertarian) 0.9%; ▌Anna Jewel Revies (Reform) 0.4% |

== Missouri ==
| District | | Incumbent | | | Results | Candidates |
| District | Cook PVI (2008) | Representative | Party | First elected | Results | Candidates |
|---|---|---|---|---|---|---|
| Missouri 1 | D+27 | Lacy Clay | Democratic | 2000 | Incumbent re-elected. | ▌ ✓ Lacy Clay (Democratic) 73.6%; ▌Robyn Hamlin (Republican) 23.6%; ▌Julie Stone (Libertarian) 2.8% |
| Missouri 2 | R+9 | Todd Akin | Republican | 2000 | Incumbent re-elected. | ▌ ✓ Todd Akin (Republican) 67.9%; ▌Arthur Lieber (Democratic) 29.2%; ▌Steve Mosbacher (Libertarian) 2.9% |
| Missouri 3 | D+7 | Russ Carnahan | Democratic | 2004 | Incumbent re-elected. | ▌ ✓ Russ Carnahan (Democratic) 48.9%; ▌Ed Martin (Republican) 46.7%; ▌Steven Hedrick (Libertarian) 2.8%; ▌Nick Ivanovich (Constitution) 1.6% |
| Missouri 4 | R+14 | Ike Skelton | Democratic | 1976 | Incumbent lost re-election. Republican gain. | ▌ ✓ Vicky Hartzler (Republican) 50.4%; ▌Ike Skelton (Democratic) 45.1%; ▌Jason Michael Braun (Libertarian) 2.7%; ▌Greg Cowan (Constitution) 1.7% |
| Missouri 5 | D+10 | Emanuel Cleaver | Democratic | 2004 | Incumbent re-elected. | ▌ ✓ Emanuel Cleaver (Democratic) 53.3%; ▌Jacob Turk (Republican) 44.2%; ▌Randy Langkraehr (Libertarian) 1.6%; ▌Dave Lay (Constitution) 0.9% |
| Missouri 6 | R+7 | Sam Graves | Republican | 2000 | Incumbent re-elected. | ▌ ✓ Sam Graves (Republican) 69.4%; ▌Clint Hylton (Democratic) 30.5% |
| Missouri 7 | R+17 | Roy Blunt | Republican | 1996 | Incumbent retired to run for U.S. Senator. Republican hold. | ▌ ✓ Billy Long (Republican) 63.4%; ▌Scott Eckersley (Democratic) 30.4%; ▌Kevin Craig (Libertarian) 6.2% |
| Missouri 8 | R+15 | Jo Ann Emerson | Republican | 1996 | Incumbent re-elected. | ▌ ✓ Jo Ann Emerson (Republican) 65.6%; ▌Tommy Sowers (Democratic) 28.8%; ▌Larry Bill (Independent) 3.7%; ▌Rick Vandeven (Libertarian) 2.0% |
| Missouri 9 | R+9 | Blaine Luetkemeyer | Republican | 2008 | Incumbent re-elected. | ▌ ✓ Blaine Luetkemeyer (Republican) 77.4%; ▌Christopher Dwyer (Libertarian) 22.3% |

== Montana ==
Montana's results

| District | | Incumbent | | | Results | Candidates |
| District | Cook PVI (2008) | Representative | Party | First elected | Results | Candidates |
|---|---|---|---|---|---|---|
| Montana at-large | R+7 | Denny Rehberg | Republican | 2000 | Incumbent re-elected. | ▌ ✓ Denny Rehberg (Republican) 60.3%; ▌Dennis McDonald (Democratic) 33.8%; ▌Mike Fellows (Libertarian) 5.7% |

== Nebraska ==
| District | | Incumbent | | | Results | Candidates |
| District | Cook PVI (2008) | Representative | Party | First elected | Results | Candidates |
|---|---|---|---|---|---|---|
| Nebraska 1 | R+11 | Jeff Fortenberry | Republican | 2004 | Incumbent re-elected. | ▌ ✓ Jeff Fortenberry (Republican) 71.3%; ▌Ivy Harper (Democratic) 28.7% |
| Nebraska 2 | R+6 | Lee Terry | Republican | 1998 | Incumbent re-elected. | ▌ ✓ Lee Terry (Republican) 60.8%; ▌Tom White (Democratic) 39.2% |
| Nebraska 3 | R+24 | Adrian Smith | Republican | 2006 | Incumbent re-elected. | ▌ ✓ Adrian Smith (Republican) 70.1%; ▌Rebekah Davis (Democratic) 17.9%; ▌Dan Hill (Independent) 12.0% |

== Nevada ==
Nevada's results

| District | | Incumbent | | | Results | Candidates |
| District | Cook PVI (2008) | Representative | Party | First elected | Results | Candidates |
|---|---|---|---|---|---|---|
| Nevada 1 | D+10 | Shelley Berkley | Democratic | 1998 | Incumbent re-elected. | ▌ ✓ Shelley Berkley (Democratic) 61.7%; ▌Kenneth A. Wegner (Republican) 35.3%; ▌Jonathan Hansen (Independent American) 1.7%; ▌Ed Klapproth (Libertarian) 1.3% |
| Nevada 2 | R+5 | Dean Heller | Republican | 2006 | Incumbent re-elected. | ▌ ✓ Dean Heller (Republican) 63.3%; ▌Nancy Price (Democratic) 32.7%; ▌Russell Best (Independent American) 4.0% |
| Nevada 3 | D+2 | Dina Titus | Democratic | 2008 | Incumbent lost re-election. Republican gain. | ▌ ✓ Joe Heck (Republican) 48.1%; ▌Dina Titus (Democratic) 47.5%; ▌Barry Michaels (Independent) 2.4%; ▌Joe Silvestri (Libertarian) 1.5%; ▌Scott Narder (Independent American) 0.5% |

== New Hampshire ==
New Hampshire's results

| District | | Incumbent | | | Results | Candidates |
| District | Cook PVI (2008) | Representative | Party | First elected | Results | Candidates |
|---|---|---|---|---|---|---|
| New Hampshire 1 | Even | Carol Shea-Porter | Democratic | 2006 | Incumbent lost re-election. Republican gain. | ▌ ✓ Frank Guinta (Republican) 54.0%; ▌Carol Shea-Porter (Democratic) 42.4%; ▌Philip Hodson (Libertarian) 3.5% |
| New Hampshire 2 | D+3 | Paul Hodes | Democratic | 2006 | Incumbent retired to run for U.S. Senator. Republican gain. | ▌ ✓ Charles Bass (Republican) 48.3%; ▌Annie Kuster (Democratic) 46.8%; ▌Tim vanBlommesteyn (Independent) 2.8%; ▌Howard Wilson (Libertarian) 2.1% |

== New Jersey ==
New Jersey's results

| District | | Incumbent | | | Results | Candidates |
| District | Cook PVI (2008) | Representative | Party | First elected | Results | Candidates |
|---|---|---|---|---|---|---|
| New Jersey 1 | D+12 | Rob Andrews | Democratic | 1990 | Incumbent re-elected. | ▌ ✓ Rob Andrews (Democratic) 63.2%; ▌Dale Glading (Republican) 34.8%; ▌Mark Heacock (Green) 1.0%; ▌Margaret Chapman (Independent) 0.7%; ▌Nicky Petrutz (Independent) 0.3% |
| New Jersey 2 | D+1 | Frank LoBiondo | Republican | 1994 | Incumbent re-elected. | ▌ ✓ Frank LoBiondo (Republican) 65.5%; ▌Gary Stein (Democratic) 30.9%; ▌Peter Boyce (Constitution) 2.5%; ▌Mark Lovett (Independent) 0.7%; ▌Vitov Valdes-Munoz (Independent) 0.4% |
| New Jersey 3 | R+1 | John Adler | Democratic | 2008 | Incumbent lost re-election. Republican gain. | ▌ ✓ Jon Runyan (Republican) 50.0%; ▌John Adler (Democratic) 47.3%; ▌Peter DeStefano (Tea) 1.5%; ▌Russ Conger (Libertarian) 0.7%; ▌Larry Donahue (Independent) 0.5% |
| New Jersey 4 | R+6 | Chris Smith | Republican | 1980 | Incumbent re-elected. | ▌ ✓ Chris Smith (Republican) 69.4%; ▌Howard Kleinhendler (Democratic) 27.9%; ▌Joe Siano (Libertarian) 1.6%; ▌Steve Welzer (Green) 0.8%; ▌David Meiswinkle (Independent) 0.3% |
| New Jersey 5 | R+7 | Scott Garrett | Republican | 2002 | Incumbent re-elected. | ▌ ✓ Scott Garrett (Republican) 65.0%; ▌Tod Thiese (Democratic) 32.7%; ▌Ed Fanning (Green) 1.2%; ▌Mark Quick (Independent) 0.9%; ▌James Radigan (Independent) 0.2% |
| New Jersey 6 | D+8 | Frank Pallone | Democratic | 1988 | Incumbent re-elected. | ▌ ✓ Frank Pallone (Democratic) 54.7%; ▌Anna Little (Republican) 43.7%; ▌Jack Freudenheim (Independent) 0.9%; ▌Karen Anne Zaletel (Independent) 0.7% |
| New Jersey 7 | R+3 | Leonard Lance | Republican | 2008 | Incumbent re-elected. | ▌ ✓ Leonard Lance (Republican) 59.4%; ▌Ed Potosnak (Democratic) 40.6% |
| New Jersey 8 | D+10 | Bill Pascrell | Democratic | 1996 | Incumbent re-elected. | ▌ ✓ Bill Pascrell (Democratic) 62.7%; ▌Roland Straten (Republican) 36.1%; ▌Raymond Giangrasso (Independent) 1.2% |
| New Jersey 9 | D+9 | Steve Rothman | Democratic | 1996 | Incumbent re-elected. | ▌ ✓ Steve Rothman (Democratic) 60.7%; ▌Michael Agosta (Republican) 37.8%; ▌Patricia Alessandrini (Green) 1.4% |
| New Jersey 10 | D+33 | Donald M. Payne | Democratic | 1988 | Incumbent re-elected. | ▌ ✓ Donald M. Payne (Democratic) 85.2%; ▌Michael Alonso (Republican) 12.8%; ▌Joanne Miller (Independent) 1.0%; ▌Robert Toussaint (Independent) 1.0% |
| New Jersey 11 | R+7 | Rodney Frelinghuysen | Republican | 1994 | Incumbent re-elected. | ▌ ✓ Rodney Frelinghuysen (Republican) 67.2%; ▌Douglas Herbert (Democratic) 30.5%; ▌Jim Gawron (Libertarian) 2.3% |
| New Jersey 12 | D+5 | Rush Holt Jr. | Democratic | 1998 | Incumbent re-elected. | ▌ ✓ Rush Holt Jr. (Democratic) 53.0%; ▌Scott M. Sipprelle (Republican) 45.9%; ▌Ken Cody (Independent) 1.1% |
| New Jersey 13 | D+21 | Albio Sires | Democratic | 2006 | Incumbent re-elected. | ▌ ✓ Albio Sires (Democratic) 74.1%; ▌Henrietta Dwyer (Republican) 23.0%; ▌Anthony Zanowic (Independent) 1.8%; ▌Máximo Gómez Nacer (Independent) 1.1% |

== New Mexico ==
New Mexico's results

| District | | Incumbent | | | Results | Candidates |
| District | Cook PVI (2008) | Representative | Party | First elected | Results | Candidates |
|---|---|---|---|---|---|---|
| New Mexico 1 | D+5 | Martin Heinrich | Democratic | 2008 | Incumbent re-elected. | ▌ ✓ Martin Heinrich (Democratic) 51.8%; ▌Jon Barela (Republican) 48.2% |
| New Mexico 2 | R+6 | Harry Teague | Democratic | 2008 | Incumbent lost re-election. Republican gain. | ▌ ✓ Steve Pearce (Republican) 55.4%; ▌Harry Teague (Democratic) 44.6% |
| New Mexico 3 | D+7 | Ben Ray Lujan | Democratic | 2008 | Incumbent re-elected. | ▌ ✓ Ben Ray Lujan (Democratic) 57.0%; ▌Tom Mullins (Republican) 43.0% |

== New York ==
New York's results

| District | | Incumbent | | | Results | Candidates |
| District | Cook PVI (2008) | Representative | Party | First elected | Results | Candidates |
|---|---|---|---|---|---|---|
| New York 1 | EVEN | Tim Bishop | Democratic | 2002 | Incumbent re-elected. | ▌ ✓ Tim Bishop (Democratic) 50.2%; ▌Randy Altschuler (Republican) 49.8% |
| New York 2 | D+4 | Steve Israel | Democratic | 2000 | Incumbent re-elected. | ▌ ✓ Steve Israel (Democratic) 56.4%; ▌John Gomez (Republican) 42.9%; ▌Anthony Tolda (Constitution) 0.7% |
| New York 3 | R+4 | Peter King | Republican | 1992 | Incumbent re-elected. | ▌ ✓ Peter King (Republican) 72.0%; ▌Howard Kudler (Democratic) 28.0% |
| New York 4 | D+6 | Carolyn McCarthy | Democratic | 1996 | Incumbent re-elected. | ▌ ✓ Carolyn McCarthy (Democratic) 53.6%; ▌Fran Becker (Republican) 46.4% |
| New York 5 | D+12 | Gary Ackerman | Democratic | 1983 (special) | Incumbent re-elected. | ▌ ✓ Gary Ackerman (Democratic) 63.1%; ▌James Milano (Republican) 36.2%; ▌Liz Berney (Libertarian) 0.7% |
| New York 6 | D+36 | Gregory Meeks | Democratic | 1998 | Incumbent re-elected. | ▌ ✓ Gregory Meeks (Democratic) 87.8%; ▌Asher Taub (Republican) 12.2% |
| New York 7 | D+26 | Joe Crowley | Democratic | 1998 | Incumbent re-elected. | ▌ ✓ Joe Crowley (Democratic) 80.6%; ▌Ken Reynolds (Republican) 18.2%; ▌Tony Gronowicz (Green) 1.2% |
| New York 8 | D+22 | Jerry Nadler | Democratic | 1992 | Incumbent re-elected. | ▌ ✓ Jerry Nadler (Democratic) 75.5%; ▌Susan Kone (Republican) 24.5% |
| New York 9 | D+5 | Anthony Weiner | Democratic | 1998 | Incumbent re-elected. | ▌ ✓ Anthony Weiner (Democratic) 60.8%; ▌Bob Turner (Republican) 39.2% |
| New York 10 | D+38 | Edolphus Towns | Democratic | 1982 | Incumbent re-elected. | ▌ ✓ Edolphus Towns (Democratic) 91.1%; ▌Diana Muniz (Republican) 7.1%; ▌Ernest Johnson (Conservative) 1.8% |
| New York 11 | D+38 | Yvette Clarke | Democratic | 2006 | Incumbent re-elected. | ▌ ✓ Yvette Clarke (Democratic) 90.6%; ▌Hugh Carr (Republican) 9.4% |
| New York 12 | D+33 | Nydia Velázquez | Democratic | 1992 | Incumbent re-elected. | ▌ ✓ Nydia Velázquez (Democratic) 93.9%; ▌Alice Gaffney (Conservative) 6.1% |
| New York 13 | R+4 | Michael McMahon | Democratic | 2008 | Incumbent lost re-election. Republican gain. | ▌ ✓ Michael Grimm (Republican) 51.3%; ▌Michael McMahon (Democratic) 48.0%; ▌Tom Vendittelli (Libertarian) 0.7% |
| New York 14 | D+26 | Carolyn Maloney | Democratic | 1992 | Incumbent re-elected. | ▌ ✓ Carolyn Maloney (Democratic) 75.1%; ▌David Brumberg (Republican) 22.4%; ▌Timothy Healy (Conservative) 1.3%; ▌Dino LaVerghetta (Independence) 1.1% |
| New York 15 | D+41 | Charles Rangel | Democratic | 1970 | Incumbent re-elected. | ▌ ✓ Charles Rangel (Democratic) 80.4%; ▌Michael Faulkner (Republican) 10.4%; ▌Craig Schley (Independence) 6.8%; ▌Roger Calero (Socialist Workers) 2.3% |
| New York 16 | D+41 | José E. Serrano | Democratic | 1990 | Incumbent re-elected. | ▌ ✓ José E. Serrano (Democratic) 96.3%; ▌Frank Della Valle (Republican) 3.7% |
| New York 17 | D+18 | Eliot Engel | Democratic | 1988 | Incumbent re-elected. | ▌ ✓ Eliot Engel (Democratic) 72.9%; ▌Tony Melé (Republican) 22.8%; ▌York Kleinhandler (Conservative) 4.3% |
| New York 18 | D+9 | Nita Lowey | Democratic | 1988 | Incumbent re-elected. | ▌ ✓ Nita Lowey (Democratic) 62.2%; ▌Jim Russell (Republican) 37.8% |
| New York 19 | R+3 | John Hall | Democratic | 2006 | Incumbent lost re-election. Republican gain. | ▌ ✓ Nan Hayworth (Republican) 52.7%; ▌John Hall (Democratic) 47.3% |
| New York 20 | R+2 | Scott Murphy | Democratic | 2009 (special) | Incumbent lost re-election. Republican gain. | ▌ ✓ Chris Gibson (Republican) 54.9%; ▌Scott Murphy (Democratic) 45.1% |
| New York 21 | D+6 | Paul Tonko | Democratic | 2008 | Incumbent re-elected. | ▌ ✓ Paul Tonko (Democratic) 59.3%; ▌Theodore Danz (Republican) 40.7% |
| New York 22 | D+6 | Maurice Hinchey | Democratic | 1992 | Incumbent re-elected. | ▌ ✓ Maurice Hinchey (Democratic) 52.7%; ▌George Phillips (Republican) 47.3% |
| New York 23 | R+1 | Bill Owens | Democratic | 2009 (special) | Incumbent re-elected. | ▌ ✓ Bill Owens (Democratic) 47.5%; ▌Matt Doheny (Republican) 46.4%; ▌Doug Hoffman (Conservative) 6.1% |
| New York 24 | R+2 | Mike Arcuri | Democratic | 2006 | Incumbent lost re-election. Republican gain. | ▌ ✓ Richard Hanna (Republican) 53.1%; ▌Mike Arcuri (Democratic) 46.9% |
| New York 25 | D+3 | Dan Maffei | Democratic | 2008 | Incumbent lost re-election. Republican gain. | ▌ ✓ Ann Marie Buerkle (Republican) 50.2%; ▌Dan Maffei (Democratic) 49.8% |
| New York 26 | R+6 | Chris Lee | Republican | 2008 | Incumbent re-elected. | ▌ ✓ Chris Lee (Republican) 73.6%; ▌Philip Fedele (Democratic) 26.4% |
| New York 27 | D+4 | Brian Higgins | Democratic | 2004 | Incumbent re-elected. | ▌ ✓ Brian Higgins (Democratic) 60.9%; ▌Leonard Roberto (Republican) 39.1% |
| New York 28 | D+15 | Louise Slaughter | Democratic | 1986 | Incumbent re-elected. | ▌ ✓ Louise Slaughter (Democratic) 64.9%; ▌Jill Rowland (Republican) 35.1% |
| New York 29 | R+5 | Vacant | | | Rep. Eric Massa (D) resigned March 8, 2010. Republican gain. Winner also elected to fill unexpired term, see above. | ▌ ✓ Tom Reed (Republican) 56.6%; ▌Matt Zeller (Democratic) 43.4% |

== North Carolina ==
North Carolina's results

| District | | Incumbent | | | Results | Candidates |
| District | Cook PVI (2008) | Representative | Party | First elected | Results | Candidates |
|---|---|---|---|---|---|---|
| North Carolina 1 | D+9 | G. K. Butterfield | Democratic | 2004 | Incumbent re-elected. | ▌ ✓ G. K. Butterfield (Democratic) 59.3%; ▌Ashley Woolard (Republican) 40.7% |
| North Carolina 2 | R+2 | Bob Etheridge | Democratic | 1996 | Incumbent lost re-election. Republican gain. | ▌ ✓ Renee Ellmers (Republican) 49.5%; ▌Bob Etheridge (Democratic) 48.7%; ▌Tom Rose (Libertarian) 1.8% |
| North Carolina 3 | R+16 | Walter B. Jones Jr. | Republican | 1994 | Incumbent re-elected. | ▌ ✓ Walter B. Jones Jr. (Republican) 71.9%; ▌Johnny Rouse (Democratic) 25.7%; ▌Darryl Holloman (Libertarian) 2.4% |
| North Carolina 4 | D+8 | David Price | Democratic | 1986; 1994 (defeated); 1996 | Incumbent re-elected. | ▌ ✓ David Price (Democratic) 57.2% |
| North Carolina 5 | R+15 | Virginia Foxx | Republican | 2004 | Incumbent re-elected. | ▌ ✓ Virginia Foxx (Republican) 65.9%; ▌Billy Kennedy (Democratic) 34.1% |
| North Carolina 6 | R+18 | Howard Coble | Republican | 1984 | Incumbent re-elected. | ▌ ✓ Howard Coble (Republican) 75.2%; ▌Sam Turner (Democratic) 24.8% |
| North Carolina 7 | R+5 | Mike McIntyre | Democratic | 1996 | Incumbent re-elected. | ▌ ✓ Mike McIntyre (Democratic) 53.7%; ▌Ilario Pantano (Republican) 46.3% |
| North Carolina 8 | R+2 | Larry Kissell | Democratic | 2008 | Incumbent re-elected. | ▌ ✓ Larry Kissell (Democratic) 53.0%; ▌Harold Johnson (Republican) 43.7%; ▌Thomas Hill (Libertarian) 3.0% |
| North Carolina 9 | R+11 | Sue Myrick | Republican | 1994 | Incumbent re-elected. | ▌ ✓ Sue Myrick (Republican) 69.0%; ▌Jeff Doctor (Democratic) 31.0% |
| North Carolina 10 | R+17 | Patrick McHenry | Republican | 2004 | Incumbent re-elected. | ▌ ✓ Patrick McHenry (Republican) 71.2%; ▌Jeff Gregory (Democratic) 28.8% |
| North Carolina 11 | R+6 | Heath Shuler | Democratic | 2006 | Incumbent re-elected. | ▌ ✓ Heath Shuler (Democratic) 54.3%; ▌Jeff Miller (Republican) 45.7% |
| North Carolina 12 | D+16 | Mel Watt | Democratic | 1992 | Incumbent re-elected. | ▌ ✓ Mel Watt (Democratic) 63.9%; ▌Greg Dority (Republican) 34.1%; ▌Lon Cecil (Libertarian) 2.0% |
| North Carolina 13 | D+5 | Brad Miller | Democratic | 2002 | Incumbent re-elected. | ▌ ✓ Brad Miller (Democratic) 55.5%; ▌Bill Randall (Republican) 44.5% |

== North Dakota ==
North Dakota's results

| District | | Incumbent | | | Results | Candidates |
| District | Cook PVI (2008) | Representative | Party | First elected | Results | Candidates |
|---|---|---|---|---|---|---|
| North Dakota at-large | R+10 | Earl Pomeroy | Democratic-NPL | 1992 | Incumbent lost re-election. Republican gain. | ▌ ✓ Rick Berg (Republican) 54.7%; ▌Earl Pomeroy (Democratic-NPL) 44.9% |

== Ohio ==
Ohio's results

| District | | Incumbent | | | Results | Candidates |
| District | Cook PVI (2008) | Representative | Party | First elected | Results | Candidates |
|---|---|---|---|---|---|---|
| Ohio 1 | D+1 | Steve Driehaus | Democratic | 2008 | Incumbent lost re-election. Republican gain. | ▌ ✓ Steve Chabot (Republican) 51.5%; ▌Steve Driehaus (Democratic) 46.0%; ▌Jim Berns (Libertarian) 1.5%; ▌Rich Stevenson (Green) 1.0% |
| Ohio 2 | R+13 | Jean Schmidt | Republican | 2005 (special) | Incumbent re-elected. | ▌ ✓ Jean Schmidt (Republican) 58.5%; ▌Surya Yalamanchili (Democratic) 34.7%; ▌Marc Johnston (Libertarian) 6.8% |
| Ohio 3 | R+5 | Mike Turner | Republican | 2002 | Incumbent re-elected. | ▌ ✓ Mike Turner (Republican) 68.1%; ▌Joe Roberts (Democratic) 31.9% |
| Ohio 4 | R+15 | Jim Jordan | Republican | 2006 | Incumbent re-elected. | ▌ ✓ Jim Jordan (Republican) 71.5%; ▌Doug Litt (Democratic) 24.7%; ▌Donald Kissick (Libertarian) 3.8% |
| Ohio 5 | R+9 | Bob Latta | Republican | 2007 (special) | Incumbent re-elected. | ▌ ✓ Bob Latta (Republican) 67.8%; ▌Caleb Finkenbiner (Democratic) 26.5%; ▌Brian Smith (Libertarian) 5.7% |
| Ohio 6 | R+2 | Charlie Wilson | Democratic | 2006 | Incumbent lost re-election. Republican gain. | ▌ ✓ Bill Johnson (Republican) 50.2%; ▌Charlie Wilson (Democratic) 45.1%; ▌Richard Cadle (Constitution) 2.5%; ▌Martin Elsass (Libertarian) 2.2% |
| Ohio 7 | R+7 | Steve Austria | Republican | 2008 | Incumbent re-elected. | ▌ ✓ Steve Austria (Republican) 62.2%; ▌Bill Conner (Democratic) 32.3%; ▌John Anderson (Libertarian) 4.3%; ▌David Easton (Constitution) 1.3% |
| Ohio 8 | R+14 | John Boehner | Republican | 1990 | Incumbent re-elected. | ▌ ✓ John Boehner (Republican) 65.6%; ▌Justin Coussoule (Democratic) 30.3%; ▌David Harlow (Libertarian) 2.4%; ▌James Condit (Constitution) 1.7% |
| Ohio 9 | D+10 | Marcy Kaptur | Democratic | 1982 | Incumbent re-elected. | ▌ ✓ Marcy Kaptur (Democratic) 59.4%; ▌Rich Iott (Republican) 40.6% |
| Ohio 10 | D+8 | Dennis Kucinich | Democratic | 1996 | Incumbent re-elected. | ▌ ✓ Dennis Kucinich (Democratic) 53.0%; ▌Peter Corrigan (Republican) 43.9%; ▌Jeff Goggins (Libertarian) 3.1% |
| Ohio 11 | D+32 | Marcia Fudge | Democratic | 2008 | Incumbent re-elected. | ▌ ✓ Marcia Fudge (Democratic) 82.9%; ▌Thomas Pekarek (Republican) 17.1% |
| Ohio 12 | D+1 | Pat Tiberi | Republican | 2000 | Incumbent re-elected. | ▌ ✓ Pat Tiberi (Republican) 55.8%; ▌Paula Brooks (Democratic) 40.9%; ▌Travis Irvine (Libertarian) 3.2% |
| Ohio 13 | D+5 | Betty Sutton | Democratic | 2006 | Incumbent re-elected. | ▌ ✓ Betty Sutton (Democratic) 55.7%; ▌Tom Ganley (Republican) 44.3% |
| Ohio 14 | R+3 | Steve LaTourette | Republican | 1994 | Incumbent re-elected. | ▌ ✓ Steve LaTourette (Republican) 64.9%; ▌William O'Neill (Democratic) 31.5%; ▌John Jelenic (Libertarian) 3.6% |
| Ohio 15 | D+1 | Mary Jo Kilroy | Democratic | 2008 | Incumbent lost re-election. Republican gain. | ▌ ✓ Steve Stivers (Republican) 54.1%; ▌Mary Jo Kilroy (Democratic) 41.3%; ▌William Kammerer (Libertarian) 2.8%; ▌David Ryon (Constitution) 1.8% |
| Ohio 16 | R+4 | John Boccieri | Democratic | 2008 | Incumbent lost re-election. Republican gain. | ▌ ✓ Jim Renacci (Republican) 52.1%; ▌John Boccieri (Democratic) 41.3%; ▌Jeffrey Blevins (Libertarian) 6.6% |
| Ohio 17 | D+12 | Tim Ryan | Democratic | 2002 | Incumbent re-elected. | ▌ ✓ Tim Ryan (Democratic) 53.9%; ▌Jim Graham (Republican) 30.1%; ▌Jim Traficant (Independent) 16.0% |
| Ohio 18 | R+7 | Zack Space | Democratic | 2006 | Incumbent lost re-election. Republican gain. | ▌ ✓ Bob Gibbs (Republican) 53.9%; ▌Zack Space (Democratic) 40.5%; ▌Lindsey Sutton (Constitution) 5.6% |

== Oklahoma ==
Oklahoma's results

| District | | Incumbent | | | Results | Candidates |
| District | Cook PVI (2008) | Representative | Party | First elected | Results | Candidates |
|---|---|---|---|---|---|---|
| Oklahoma 1 | R+16 | John Sullivan | Republican | 2002 | Incumbent re-elected. | ▌ ✓ John Sullivan (Republican) 76.8%; ▌Angelia O'Dell (Independent) 23.2% |
| Oklahoma 2 | R+14 | Dan Boren | Democratic | 2004 | Incumbent re-elected. | ▌ ✓ Dan Boren (Democratic) 56.5%; ▌Charles Thompson (Republican) 43.5% |
| Oklahoma 3 | R+24 | Frank Lucas | Republican | 1994 | Incumbent re-elected. | ▌ ✓ Frank Lucas (Republican) 78.0%; ▌Frankie Robbins (Democratic) 22.0% |
| Oklahoma 4 | R+18 | Tom Cole | Republican | 2002 | Incumbent re-elected. | ▌ ✓ Tom Cole (Republican); Uncontested |
| Oklahoma 5 | R+13 | Mary Fallin | Republican | 2006 | Incumbent retired to run for Governor of Oklahoma. Republican hold. | ▌ ✓ James Lankford (Republican) 62.5%; ▌Billy Coyle (Democratic) 34.5%; ▌Clark Duffe (Independent) 1.6%; ▌Dave White (Independent) 1.4% |

== Oregon ==
Oregon's results

| District | | Incumbent | | | Results | Candidates |
| District | Cook PVI (2008) | Representative | Party | First elected | Results | Candidates |
|---|---|---|---|---|---|---|
| Oregon 1 | D+8 | David Wu | Democratic | 1998 | Incumbent re-elected. | ▌ ✓ David Wu (Democratic) 54.8%; ▌Rob Cornilles (Republican) 42.0%; ▌Don LaMunyon (Constitution) 1.3%; ▌Chris Henry (Pacific Green) 1.0%; ▌Joe Tabor (Libertarian) 0.9% |
| Oregon 2 | R+10 | Greg Walden | Republican | 1998 | Incumbent re-elected. | ▌ ✓ Greg Walden (Republican) 74.1%; ▌Joyce Segers (Democratic) 25.9% |
| Oregon 3 | D+19 | Earl Blumenauer | Democratic | 1996 | Incumbent re-elected. | ▌ ✓ Earl Blumenauer (Democratic) 70.1%; ▌Delia Lopez (Republican) 24.6%; ▌Jeff Lawrence (Libertarian) 3.0%; ▌Michael Meo (Pacific Green) 2.3% |
| Oregon 4 | D+2 | Peter DeFazio | Democratic | 1986 | Incumbent re-elected. | ▌ ✓ Peter DeFazio (Democratic) 54.6%; ▌Art Robinson (Republican) 43.7%; ▌Mike Beilstein (Pacific Green) 1.7% |
| Oregon 5 | D+1 | Kurt Schrader | Democratic | 2008 | Incumbent re-elected. | ▌ ✓ Kurt Schrader (Democratic) 51.3%; ▌Scott Bruun (Republican) 46.0%; ▌Chris Lugo (Pacific Green) 2.7% |

== Pennsylvania ==
Pennsylvania's results

| District | | Incumbent | | | Results | Candidates |
| District | Cook PVI (2008) | Representative | Party | First elected | Results | Candidates |
|---|---|---|---|---|---|---|
| Pennsylvania 1 | D+35 | Bob Brady | Democratic | 1998 | Incumbent re-elected. | ▌ ✓ Bob Brady (Democratic) 100% |
| Pennsylvania 2 | D+38 | Chaka Fattah | Democratic | 1994 | Incumbent re-elected. | ▌ ✓ Chaka Fattah (Democratic) 89.3%; ▌Rick Hellberg (Republican) 10.7% |
| Pennsylvania 3 | R+3 | Kathy Dahlkemper | Democratic | 2008 | Incumbent lost reelection. Republican gain. | ▌ ✓ Mike Kelly (Republican) 55.7%; ▌Kathy Dahlkemper (Democratic) 44.3% |
| Pennsylvania 4 | R+6 | Jason Altmire | Democratic | 2006 | Incumbent re-elected. | ▌ ✓ Jason Altmire (Democratic) 50.8%; ▌Keith Rothfus (Republican) 49.2% |
| Pennsylvania 5 | R+9 | Glenn Thompson | Republican | 2008 | Incumbent re-elected. | ▌ ✓ Glenn Thompson (Republican) 68.7%; ▌Michael Pipe (Democratic) 28.2%; ▌Vernon Etzel (Libertarian) 3.1% |
| Pennsylvania 6 | D+4 | Jim Gerlach | Republican | 2002 | Incumbent re-elected. | ▌ ✓ Jim Gerlach (Republican) 57.1%; ▌Manan Trivedi (Democratic) 42.9% |
| Pennsylvania 7 | D+3 | Joe Sestak | Democratic | 2006 | Incumbent retired to run for U.S. Senator. Republican gain. | ▌ ✓ Pat Meehan (Republican) 54.9%; ▌Bryan Lentz (Democratic) 44.0%; ▌Jim Schneller (Independent) 1.1% |
| Pennsylvania 8 | D+2 | Patrick Murphy | Democratic | 2006 | Incumbent lost reelection. Republican gain. | ▌ ✓ Mike Fitzpatrick (Republican) 53.5%; ▌Patrick Murphy (Democratic) 46.5% |
| Pennsylvania 9 | R+17 | Bill Shuster | Republican | 2001 (special) | Incumbent re-elected. | ▌ ✓ Bill Shuster (Republican) 73.1%; ▌Tom Conners (Democratic) 26.9% |
| Pennsylvania 10 | R+8 | Chris Carney | Democratic | 2006 | Incumbent lost reelection. Republican gain. | ▌ ✓ Tom Marino (Republican) 55.2%; ▌Chris Carney (Democratic) 44.8% |
| Pennsylvania 11 | D+4 | Paul Kanjorski | Democratic | 1984 | Incumbent lost reelection. Republican gain. | ▌ ✓ Lou Barletta (Republican) 54.7%; ▌Paul Kanjorski (Democratic) 45.3% |
| Pennsylvania 12 | R+1 | Mark Critz | Democratic | 2010 | Incumbent re-elected. | ▌ ✓ Mark Critz (Democratic) 50.8%; ▌Tim Burns (Republican) 49.2% |
| Pennsylvania 13 | D+7 | Allyson Schwartz | Democratic | 2004 | Incumbent re-elected. | ▌ ✓ Allyson Schwartz (Democratic) 56.3%; ▌Dee Adcock (Republican) 43.7% |
| Pennsylvania 14 | D+19 | Mike Doyle | Democratic | 1994 | Incumbent re-elected. | ▌ ✓ Mike Doyle (Democratic) 68.8%; ▌Melissa Haluszczak (Republican) 28.2%; ▌Ed Bortz (Green) 3.0% |
| Pennsylvania 15 | D+2 | Charlie Dent | Republican | 2004 | Incumbent re-elected. | ▌ ✓ Charlie Dent (Republican) 53.5%; ▌John Callahan (Democratic) 39.0%; ▌Jake Towne (Independent) 7.5% |
| Pennsylvania 16 | R+8 | Joe Pitts | Republican | 1996 | Incumbent re-elected. | ▌ ✓ Joe Pitts (Republican) 65.4%; ▌Lois Herr (Democratic) 34.6% |
| Pennsylvania 17 | R+6 | Tim Holden | Democratic | 1992 | Incumbent re-elected. | ▌ ✓ Tim Holden (Democratic) 55.5%; ▌Dave Argall (Republican) 44.5% |
| Pennsylvania 18 | R+6 | Tim Murphy | Republican | 2002 | Incumbent re-elected. | ▌ ✓ Tim Murphy (Republican) 67.3%; ▌Dan Connolly (Democratic) 32.7% |
| Pennsylvania 19 | R+12 | Todd Platts | Republican | 2000 | Incumbent re-elected. | ▌ ✓ Todd Platts (Republican) 71.9%; ▌Ryan Sanders (Democratic) 23.3%; ▌Joshua Monighan (Independent) 4.8% |

== Rhode Island ==
| District | | Incumbent | | | Results | Candidates |
| District | Cook PVI (2008) | Representative | Party | First elected | Results | Candidates |
|---|---|---|---|---|---|---|
| Rhode Island 1 | D+13 | Patrick J. Kennedy | Democratic | 1994 | Incumbent retired. Democratic hold. | ▌ ✓ David Cicilline (Democratic) 50.6%; ▌John J. Loughlin (Republican) 44.6%; ▌Kenneth Capalbo (Independent) 4.0%; ▌Gregory Raposa (Independent) 0.8% |
| Rhode Island 2 | D+9 | Jim Langevin | Democratic | 2000 | Incumbent re-elected. | ▌ ✓ Jim Langevin (Democratic) 59.9%; ▌Mark Zaccaria (Republican) 31.8%; ▌John Matson (Independent) 8.4% |

== South Carolina ==
South Carolina's results

| District | | Incumbent | | | Results | Candidates |
| District | Cook PVI (2008) | Representative | Party | First elected | Results | Candidates |
|---|---|---|---|---|---|---|
| South Carolina 1 | R+10 | Henry E. Brown Jr. | Republican | 2000 | Incumbent retired. Republican hold. | ▌ ✓ Tim Scott (Republican) 65.4%; ▌Ben Frasier (Democratic) 28.7%; ▌Rob Groce (Working Families) 1.8%; ▌Bob Dobbs (Green) 1.4%; ▌Keith Blandford (Libertarian) 1.2%; ▌Jimmy Wood (Independence) 1.1%; ▌Mac McCullough (United Citizens) 0.4% |
| South Carolina 2 | R+9 | Joe Wilson | Republican | 2001 (special) | Incumbent re-elected. | ▌ ✓ Joe Wilson (Republican) 53.5%; ▌Rob Miller (Democratic) 43.8%; ▌Eddie McCain (Libertarian) 1.6%; ▌Marc Beaman (Constitution) 1.1% |
| South Carolina 3 | R+17 | J. Gresham Barrett | Republican | 2002 | Incumbent retired to run for Governor of South Carolina. Republican hold. | ▌ ✓ Jeff Duncan (Republican) 62.5%; ▌Jane Ballard Dyer (Democratic) 36.2%; ▌John Dalen (Constitution) 1.3% |
| South Carolina 4 | R+15 | Bob Inglis | Republican | 1992; 1998 (retired); 2004 | Incumbent lost renomination. Republican hold. | ▌ ✓ Trey Gowdy (Republican) 63.5%; ▌Paul Corden (Democratic) 28.8%; ▌Dave Edwards (Constitution) 5.1%; ▌Rick Mahler (Libertarian) 1.4%; ▌Faye Walters (Green) 1.2% |
| South Carolina 5 | R+7 | John Spratt | Democratic | 1982 | Incumbent lost reelection. Republican gain. | ▌ ✓ Mick Mulvaney (Republican) 55.1%; ▌John Spratt (Democratic) 44.9% |
| South Carolina 6 | D+12 | Jim Clyburn | Democratic | 1992 | Incumbent re-elected. | ▌ ✓ Jim Clyburn (Democratic) 62.9%; ▌Jim Pratt (Republican) 36.4%; ▌Nammu Muhammad (Green) 0.7% |

== South Dakota ==
South Dakota's results

| District | | Incumbent | | | Results | Candidates |
| District | Cook PVI (2008) | Representative | Party | First elected | Results | Candidates |
|---|---|---|---|---|---|---|
| South Dakota at-large | R+9 | Stephanie Herseth Sandlin | Democratic | 2004 (special) | Incumbent lost reelection. Republican gain. | ▌ ✓ Kristi Noem (Republican) 48.1%; ▌Stephanie Herseth Sandlin (Democratic) 45.9%; ▌Thomas Marking (Independent) 6.0% |

== Tennessee ==
Tennessee's results

| District | | Incumbent | | | Results | Candidates |
| District | Cook PVI (2008) | Representative | Party | First elected | Results | Candidates |
|---|---|---|---|---|---|---|
| Tennessee 1 | R+21 | Phil Roe | Republican | 2008 | Incumbent re-elected. | ▌ ✓ Phil Roe (Republican) 80.8%; ▌Michael Clark (Democratic) 17.1%; ▌Kermit Steck (Independent) 2.1% |
| Tennessee 2 | R+16 | Jimmy Duncan | Republican | 1998 | Incumbent re-elected. | ▌ ✓ Jimmy Duncan (Republican) 81.7%; ▌Dave Hancock (Democratic) 14.7%; ▌Joe Leinweber (Independent) 1.4%; ▌Andy Andrew (Independent) 1.2%; ▌Greg Samples (Libertarian) 0.7%; ▌Jim Headings (Constitution) 0.3% |
| Tennessee 3 | R+13 | Zach Wamp | Republican | 1994 | Incumbent retired to run for Governor of Tennessee. Republican hold. | ▌ ✓ Charles Fleischmann (Republican) 56.8%; ▌John Wolfe Jr. (Democratic) 28.0%; ▌Savas Kyriakidis (Independent) 10.5%; ▌Mark DeVol (Independent) 3.6%; ▌Don Barkman (Independent) 0.5%; ▌Greg Goodwin (Independent) 0.2%; ▌Robert Humphries (Independent) 0.2%; ▌Mo Kiah (Libertarian) 0.1% |
| Tennessee 4 | R+13 | Lincoln Davis | Democratic | 2002 | Incumbent lost reelection. Republican gain. | ▌ ✓ Scott DesJarlais (Republican) 57.1%; ▌Lincoln Davis (Democratic) 38.6%; ▌Paul Curtis (Independent) 1.7%; ▌Gerald York (Independent) 1.2%; ▌James Gray (Independent) 0.9%; ▌Richard Johnson (Independent) 0.5% |
| Tennessee 5 | D+3 | Jim Cooper | Democratic | 1982; 1994 (retired); 2002 | Incumbent re-elected. | ▌ ✓ Jim Cooper (Democratic) 56.2%; ▌David Hall (Republican) 42.1%; ▌Stephen Collings (Libertarian) 0.3%; ▌John Smith (Independent) 0.3%; ▌Jackie Miller (Independent) 0.3%; ▌John Miglietta (Green) 0.2%; ▌Bill Crook (Independent) 0.2%; ▌James Whitfield (Independent) 0.2%; ▌Joe Moore (Independent) 0.1%; ▌Clark Taylor (Independent) 0.1% |
| Tennessee 6 | R+13 | Bart Gordon | Democratic | 1984 | Incumbent retired. Republican gain. | ▌ ✓ Diane Black (Republican) 67.3%; ▌Brett Carter (Democratic) 29.4%; ▌Jim Boyd (Independent) 1.1%; ▌David Purcell (Independent) 0.7%; ▌Tommy Hay (Independent) 0.7%; ▌Brandon Gore (Independent) 0.6%; ▌Stephen Sprague (Independent) 0.3% |
| Tennessee 7 | R+18 | Marsha Blackburn | Republican | 2002 | Incumbent re-elected. | ▌ ✓ Marsha Blackburn (Republican) 72.4%; ▌Greg Rabidoux (Democratic) 24.8%; ▌Bill Stone (Independent) 2.9% |
| Tennessee 8 | R+6 | John Tanner | Democratic | 1988 | Incumbent retired. Republican gain. | ▌ ✓ Stephen Fincher (Republican) 59.0%; ▌Roy Herron (Democratic) 38.8%; ▌Donn Janes (Independent) 1.5%; ▌Mark Rawles (Independent) 0.7% |
| Tennessee 9 | D+23 | Steve Cohen | Democratic | 2006 | Incumbent re-elected. | ▌ ✓ Steve Cohen (Democratic) 74.0%; ▌Charlotte Bergmann (Republican) 25.1%; ▌Sandra Sullivan (Independent) 0.5%; ▌Perry Steele (Independent) 0.4% |

== Texas ==
Texas's results

| District | | Incumbent | | | Results | Candidates |
| District | Cook PVI (2008) | Representative | Party | First elected | Results | Candidates |
|---|---|---|---|---|---|---|
| Texas 1 | R+21 | Louie Gohmert | Republican | 2004 | Incumbent re-elected. | ▌ ✓ Louie Gohmert (Republican) 89.7%; ▌Charles Parkes (Libertarian) 10.3% |
| Texas 2 | R+13 | Ted Poe | Republican | 2004 | Incumbent re-elected. | ▌ ✓ Ted Poe (Republican) 88.6%; ▌David Smith (Libertarian) 11.4% |
| Texas 3 | R+14 | Sam Johnson | Republican | 1991 (special) | Incumbent re-elected. | ▌ ✓ Sam Johnson (Republican) 66.3%; ▌John Lingenfelder (Democratic) 31.3%; ▌Christopher J. Claytor (Libertarian) 2.4% |
| Texas 4 | R+21 | Ralph Hall | Republican | 1980 (Note: Hall was first elected as a Democrat. He became a Republican in January 2004.) | Incumbent re-elected. | ▌ ✓ Ralph Hall (Republican) 73.2%; ▌VaLinda Hathcox (Democratic) 22.0%; ▌Jim Prindle (Libertarian) 2.5%; ▌Shane Shepard (Independent) 2.3% |
| Texas 5 | R+17 | Jeb Hensarling | Republican | 2002 | Incumbent re-elected. | ▌ ✓ Jeb Hensarling (Republican) 70.5%; ▌Tom Berry (Democratic) 27.5%; ▌Ken Ashby (Libertarian) 2.0% |
| Texas 6 | R+15 | Joe Barton | Republican | 1984 | Incumbent re-elected. | ▌ ✓ Joe Barton (Republican) 65.9%; ▌David Cozad (Democratic) 31.2%; ▌Byron Severns (Libertarian) 2.9% |
| Texas 7 | R+13 | John Culberson | Republican | 2000 | Incumbent re-elected. | ▌ ✓ John Culberson (Republican) 81.4%; ▌Bob Townsend (Libertarian) 18.0% |
| Texas 8 | R+25 | Kevin Brady | Republican | 1996 | Incumbent re-elected. | ▌ ✓ Kevin Brady (Republican) 80.3%; ▌Kent Hargett (Democratic) 17.2%; ▌Bruce West (Libertarian) 2.5% |
| Texas 9 | D+22 | Al Green | Democratic | 2004 | Incumbent re-elected. | ▌ ✓ Al Green (Democratic) 75.7%; ▌Steve Mueller (Republican) 22.9%; ▌Michael Hope (Libertarian) 1.4% |
| Texas 10 | R+10 | Michael McCaul | Republican | 2004 | Incumbent re-elected. | ▌ ✓ Michael McCaul (Republican) 64.7%; ▌Ted Ankrum (Democratic) 33.0%; ▌J. P. Perkins (Libertarian) 2.3% |
| Texas 11 | R+28 | Mike Conaway | Republican | 2004 | Incumbent re-elected. | ▌ ✓ Mike Conaway (Republican) 80.8%; ▌James Quillan (Democratic) 15.4%; ▌James Powell (Libertarian) 2.8%; ▌Jim Howe (Green) 0.9% |
| Texas 12 | R+16 | Kay Granger | Republican | 1996 | Incumbent re-elected. | ▌ ✓ Kay Granger (Republican) 71.9%; ▌Tracey Smith (Democratic) 25.1%; ▌Matthew Solodow (Libertarian) 3.0% |
| Texas 13 | R+29 | Mac Thornberry | Republican | 1994 | Incumbent re-elected. | ▌ ✓ Mac Thornberry (Republican) 87.1%; ▌Keith Dyer (Independent) 8.6%; ▌John Burwell (Libertarian) 4.3% |
| Texas 14 | R+18 | Ron Paul | Republican | 1976 (special); 1976 (defeated); 1978; 1984 (retired); 1996 | Incumbent re-elected. | ▌ ✓ Ron Paul (Republican) 76.0%; ▌Robert Pruett (Democratic) 24.0% |
| Texas 15 | D+3 | Rubén Hinojosa | Democratic | 1996 | Incumbent re-elected. | ▌ ✓ Rubén Hinojosa (Democratic) 55.7%; ▌Eddie Zamora (Republican) 41.6%; ▌Aaron Cohn (Libertarian) 2.7% |
| Texas 16 | D+10 | Silvestre Reyes | Democratic | 1996 | Incumbent re-elected. | ▌ ✓ Silvestre Reyes (Democratic) 58.1%; ▌Tim Besco (Republican) 36.6%; ▌Bill Collins (Libertarian) 5.1% |
| Texas 17 | R+20 | Chet Edwards | Democratic | 1990 | Incumbent lost re-election. Republican gain. | ▌ ✓ Bill Flores (Republican) 61.8%; ▌Chet Edwards (Democratic) 36.6%; ▌Richard Kelly (Libertarian) 1.6% |
| Texas 18 | D+24 | Sheila Jackson Lee | Democratic | 1994 | Incumbent re-elected. | ▌ ✓ Sheila Jackson Lee (Democratic) 70.1%; ▌John Faulk (Republican) 27.3%; ▌Mike Taylor (Libertarian) 2.6% |
| Texas 19 | R+26 | Randy Neugebauer | Republican | 2002 | Incumbent re-elected. | ▌ ✓ Randy Neugebauer (Republican) 77.7%; ▌Andy Wilson (Democratic) 19.1%; ▌Chip Peterson (Libertarian) 3.2% |
| Texas 20 | D+8 | Charlie González | Democratic | 1998 | Incumbent re-elected. | ▌ ✓ Charlie González (Democratic) 63.6%; ▌Clayton Trotter (Republican) 34.5%; ▌Michael Idrogo (Libertarian) 1.9% |
| Texas 21 | R+14 | Lamar S. Smith | Republican | 1986 | Incumbent re-elected. | ▌ ✓ Lamar S. Smith (Republican) 68.9%; ▌Laney Melnick (Democratic) 27.9%; ▌James Arthur Strohm (Libertarian) 3.2% |
| Texas 22 | R+13 | Pete Olson | Republican | 2008 | Incumbent re-elected. | ▌ ✓ Pete Olson (Republican) 67.5%; ▌Kesha Rogers (Democratic) 29.8%; ▌Steven Susman (Libertarian) 2.7% |
| Texas 23 | R+4 | Ciro Rodriguez | Democratic | 1997 (special); 2004 (lost renomination); 2006 | Incumbent lost re-election. Republican gain. | ▌ ✓ Quico Canseco (Republican) 49.4%; ▌Ciro Rodriguez (Democratic) 44.4%; ▌Craig Stephens (Independent) 3.6%; ▌Martin Nitschke (Libertarian) 1.6%; ▌Ed Scharf (Green) 0.9% |
| Texas 24 | R+11 | Kenny Marchant | Republican | 2004 | Incumbent re-elected. | ▌ ✓ Kenny Marchant (Republican) 81.6%; ▌David Sparks (Libertarian) 18.4% |
| Texas 25 | D+6 | Lloyd Doggett | Democratic | 1994 | Incumbent re-elected. | ▌ ✓ Lloyd Doggett (Democratic) 52.8%; ▌Donna Campbell (Republican) 44.8%; ▌Jim Stutsman (Libertarian) 2.3% |
| Texas 26 | R+13 | Michael C. Burgess | Republican | 2002 | Incumbent re-elected. | ▌ ✓ Michael C. Burgess (Republican) 67.1%; ▌Neil Durrance (Democratic) 30.7%; ▌Mark Boler (Libertarian) 2.2% |
| Texas 27 | R+2 | Solomon Ortiz | Democratic | 1982 | Incumbent lost re-election. Republican gain. | ▌ ✓ Blake Farenthold (Republican) 47.9%; ▌Solomon Ortiz (Democratic) 47.1%; ▌Ed Mishou (Libertarian) 5.0% |
| Texas 28 | EVEN | Henry Cuellar | Democratic | 2004 | Incumbent re-elected. | ▌ ✓ Henry Cuellar (Democratic) 56.3%; ▌Bryan Underwood (Republican) 42.0%; ▌Stephen Kaat (Libertarian) 1.7% |
| Texas 29 | D+8 | Gene Green | Democratic | 1992 | Incumbent re-elected. | ▌ ✓ Gene Green (Democratic) 64.6%; ▌Roy Morales (Republican) 34.1%; ▌Brad Walters (Libertarian) 1.3% |
| Texas 30 | D+27 | Eddie Bernice Johnson | Democratic | 1992 | Incumbent re-elected. | ▌ ✓ Eddie Bernice Johnson (Democratic) 75.7%; ▌Stephen Broden (Republican) 21.6%; ▌J. B. Oswalt (Libertarian) 2.6% |
| Texas 31 | R+14 | John Carter | Republican | 2002 | Incumbent re-elected. | ▌ ✓ John Carter (Republican) 82.5%; ▌Bill Oliver (Libertarian) 17.5% |
| Texas 32 | R+8 | Pete Sessions | Republican | 1996 | Incumbent re-elected. | ▌ ✓ Pete Sessions (Republican) 62.6%; ▌Grier Raggio (Democratic) 34.9%; ▌John Jay Myers (Libertarian) 2.5% |

== Utah ==
Utah's results

| District | | Incumbent | | | Results | Candidates |
| District | Cook PVI (2008) | Representative | Party | First elected | Results | Candidates |
|---|---|---|---|---|---|---|
| Utah 1 | R+21 | Rob Bishop | Republican | 2002 | Incumbent re-elected. | ▌ ✓ Rob Bishop (Republican) 69.2%; ▌Morgan Bowen (Democratic) 23.9%; ▌Kirk Pearson (Constitution) 4.7%; ▌Jared Paul Stratton (Libertarian) 2.2% |
| Utah 2 | R+15 | Jim Matheson | Democratic | 2000 | Incumbent re-elected. | ▌ ✓ Jim Matheson (Democratic) 50.5%; ▌Morgan Philpot (Republican) 46.1%; ▌Randall Hinton (Constitution) 1.8%; ▌Dave Glissmeyer (Independent) 0.9%; ▌Wayne Hill (Independent) 0.7% |
| Utah 3 | R+26 | Jason Chaffetz | Republican | 2008 | Incumbent re-elected. | ▌ ✓ Jason Chaffetz (Republican) 72.3%; ▌Karen Hyer (Democratic) 22.9%; ▌Douglas Sligting (Constitution) 2.4%; ▌Jake Shannon (Libertarian) 1.5%; ▌Joseph Puente (Independent) 0.8% |

== Vermont ==
Vermont's results

| District | | Incumbent | | | Results | Candidates |
| District | Cook PVI (2008) | Representative | Party | First elected | Results | Candidates |
|---|---|---|---|---|---|---|
| Vermont at-large | D+13 | Peter Welch | Democratic | 2006 | Incumbent re-elected. | ▌ ✓ Peter Welch (Democratic) 64.6%; ▌Paul Beaudry (Republican) 32.0%; ▌Gus Jaccaci (Independent) 2.0%; ▌Jane Newton (Socialist) 1.4% |

== Virginia ==
| District | | Incumbent | | | Results | Candidates |
| District | Cook PVI (2008) | Representative | Party | First elected | Results | Candidates |
|---|---|---|---|---|---|---|
| Virginia 1 | R+7 | Rob Wittman | Republican | 2007 (special) | Incumbent re-elected. | ▌ ✓ Rob Wittman (Republican) 63.9%; ▌Krystal Ball (Democratic) 34.8%; ▌Gail Parker (Independent Green) 1.2% |
| Virginia 2 | R+5 | Glenn Nye | Democratic | 2008 | Incumbent lost reelection. Republican gain. | ▌ ✓ Scott Rigell (Republican) 53.1%; ▌Glenn Nye (Democratic) 42.5%; ▌Kenny Golden (Independent) 4.3% |
| Virginia 3 | D+20 | Bobby Scott | Democratic | 1992 | Incumbent re-elected. | ▌ ✓ Bobby Scott (Democratic) 70.0%; ▌Chuck Smith (Republican) 27.2%; ▌James Quigley (Libertarian) 1.5%; ▌John D. Kelly (Independent) 1.2% |
| Virginia 4 | R+4 | Randy Forbes | Republican | 2001 (special) | Incumbent re-elected. | ▌ ✓ Randy Forbes (Republican) 62.3%; ▌Wynne LeGrow (Democratic) 37.5% |
| Virginia 5 | R+5 | Tom Perriello | Democratic | 2008 | Incumbent lost reelection. Republican gain. | ▌ ✓ Robert Hurt (Republican) 50.8%; ▌Tom Perriello (Democratic) 47.0%; ▌Jeff Clark (Independent) 2.1% |
| Virginia 6 | R+12 | Bob Goodlatte | Republican | 1992 | Incumbent re-elected. | ▌ ✓ Bob Goodlatte (Republican) 76.3%; ▌Jeff Vanke (Independent) 13.0%; ▌Stuart Bain (Libertarian) 9.2% |
| Virginia 7 | R+9 | Eric Cantor | Republican | 2000 | Incumbent re-elected. | ▌ ✓ Eric Cantor (Republican) 59.2%; ▌Rick Waugh (Democratic) 34.1%; ▌Floyd Bayne (Independent Green) 6.5% |
| Virginia 8 | D+16 | Jim Moran | Democratic | 1990 | Incumbent re-elected. | ▌ ✓ Jim Moran (Democratic) 61.0%; ▌J. Patrick Murray (Republican) 37.3%; ▌Ron Fisher (Independent Green) 1.4% |
| Virginia 9 | R+11 | Rick Boucher | Democratic | 1982 | Incumbent lost reelection. Republican gain. | ▌ ✓ Morgan Griffith (Republican) 51.2%; ▌Rick Boucher (Democratic) 46.4%; ▌Jeremiah Heaton (Independent) 2.3% |
| Virginia 10 | R+2 | Frank Wolf | Republican | 1980 | Incumbent re-elected. | ▌ ✓ Frank Wolf (Republican) 62.9%; ▌Jeff Barnett (Democratic) 34.8%; ▌Bill Redpath (Libertarian) 2.2% |
| Virginia 11 | D+2 | Gerry Connolly | Democratic | 2008 | Incumbent re-elected. | ▌ ✓ Gerry Connolly (Democratic) 49.2%; ▌Keith Fimian (Republican) 48.8%; Others: ▌Christopher DeCarlo (Independent) 0.8%; ▌David Dotson (Libertarian) 0.6%; ▌David Gillis (Independent Green) 0.4% |

== Washington ==
Washington's results

| District | | Incumbent | | | Results | Candidates |
| District | Cook PVI (2008) | Representative | Party | First elected | Results | Candidates |
|---|---|---|---|---|---|---|
| Washington 1 | D+9 | Jay Inslee | Democratic | 1992; 1994 (defeated); 1998 | Incumbent re-elected. | ▌ ✓ Jay Inslee (Democratic) 57.7%; ▌James Watkins (Republican) 42.3% |
| Washington 2 | D+3 | Rick Larsen | Democratic | 2000 | Incumbent re-elected. | ▌ ✓ Rick Larsen (Democratic) 51.1%; ▌John Koster (Republican) 48.9% |
| Washington 3 | EVEN | Brian Baird | Democratic | 1998 | Incumbent retired. Republican gain. | ▌ ✓ Jaime Herrera Beutler (Republican) 53.0%; ▌Denny Heck (Democratic) 47.0% |
| Washington 4 | R+13 | Doc Hastings | Republican | 1994 | Incumbent re-elected. | ▌ ✓ Doc Hastings (Republican) 67.6%; ▌Jay Clough (Democratic) 32.4% |
| Washington 5 | R+7 | Cathy McMorris Rodgers | Republican | 2004 | Incumbent re-elected. | ▌ ✓ Cathy McMorris Rodgers (Republican) 63.7%; ▌Daryl Romeyn (Democratic) 36.3% |
| Washington 6 | D+5 | Norm Dicks | Democratic | 1976 | Incumbent re-elected. | ▌ ✓ Norm Dicks (Democratic) 58.0%; ▌ Doug Cloud (Republican) 42.0% |
| Washington 7 | D+31 | Jim McDermott | Democratic | 1988 | Incumbent re-elected. | ▌ ✓ Jim McDermott (Democratic) 83.0%; ▌Bob Jeffers-Schroder (Independent) 17.0% |
| Washington 8 | D+3 | Dave Reichert | Republican | 2004 | Incumbent re-elected. | ▌ ✓ Dave Reichert (Republican) 52.1%; ▌Suzan DelBene (Democratic) 47.9% |
| Washington 9 | D+5 | Adam Smith | Democratic | 1996 | Incumbent re-elected. | ▌ ✓ Adam Smith (Democratic) 54.9%; ▌ Dick Muri (Republican) 45.1% |

== West Virginia ==
| District | | Incumbent | | | Results | Candidates |
| District | Cook PVI (2008) | Representative | Party | First elected | Results | Candidates |
|---|---|---|---|---|---|---|
| West Virginia 1 | R+9 | Alan Mollohan | Democratic | 1982 | Incumbent lost renomination. Republican gain. | ▌ ✓ David McKinley (Republican) 50.4%; ▌Mike Oliverio (Democratic) 49.6% |
| West Virginia 2 | R+8 | Shelley Moore Capito | Republican | 2000 | Incumbent re-elected. | ▌ ✓ Shelley Moore Capito (Republican) 68.5%; ▌Virginia Graf (Democratic) 29.7%; ▌Phil Hudok (Constitution) 1.8% |
| West Virginia 3 | R+6 | Nick Rahall | Democratic | 1976 | Incumbent re-elected. | ▌ ✓ Nick Rahall (Democratic) 56.0%; ▌Spike Maynard (Republican) 44.0% |

== Wisconsin ==
| District | | Incumbent | | | This race | |
| Location | PVI | Member | Party | First elected | Results | Candidates |
|---|---|---|---|---|---|---|
| Wisconsin 1 | R+2 | Paul Ryan | Republican | 1998 | Incumbent re-elected. | ▌ ✓ Paul Ryan (Republican) 68.2%; ▌John Heckenlively (Democratic) 30.1%; ▌Joseph Kexel (Libertarian) 1.6% |
| Wisconsin 2 | D+15 | Tammy Baldwin | Democratic | 1998 | Incumbent re-elected. | ▌ ✓ Tammy Baldwin (Democratic) 61.8%; ▌Chad Lee (Republican) 38.2% |
| Wisconsin 3 | D+4 | Ron Kind | Democratic | 1996 | Incumbent re-elected. | ▌ ✓ Ron Kind (Democratic) 50.3%; ▌Dan Kapanke (Republican) 46.5%; ▌Mike Krsiean (Independent) 3.2% |
| Wisconsin 4 | D+22 | Gwen Moore | Democratic | 2004 | Incumbent re-elected. | ▌ ✓ Gwen Moore (Democratic) 69.0%; ▌Dan Sebring (Republican) 29.6%; ▌Ahmad Ayyash (Independent) 1.4% |
| Wisconsin 5 | R+12 | Jim Sensenbrenner | Republican | 1978 | Incumbent re-elected. | ▌ ✓ Jim Sensenbrenner (Republican) 69.3%; ▌Todd Kolosso (Democratic) 27.4%; ▌Robert Raymond (Independent) 3.3% |
| Wisconsin 6 | R+4 | Tom Petri | Republican | 1979 (special) | Incumbent re-elected. | ▌ ✓ Tom Petri (Republican) 70.7%; ▌Joe Kallas (Democratic) 29.3% |
| Wisconsin 7 | D+3 | Dave Obey | Democratic | 1969 (special) | Incumbent retired. Republican gain. | ▌ ✓ Sean Duffy (Republican) 52.1%; ▌Julie Lassa (Democratic) 44.4%; ▌Gary Kauther (Independent) 3.3% |
| Wisconsin 8 | R+2 | Steve Kagen | Democratic | 2006 | Incumbent lost reelection. Republican gain. | ▌ ✓ Reid Ribble (Republican) 54.8%; ▌Steve Kagen (Democratic) 45.1% |

== Wyoming ==
Wyoming's results

| District | | Incumbent | | | Results | Candidates |
| District | Cook PVI (2008) | Representative | Party | First elected | Results | Candidates |
|---|---|---|---|---|---|---|
| Wyoming at-large | R+20 | Cynthia Lummis | Republican | 2008 | Incumbent re-elected. | ▌ ✓ Cynthia Lummis (Republican) 70.5%; ▌David Wendt (Democratic) 24.5%; ▌John Love (Libertarian) 5.0% |

== Non-voting delegates ==
The House of Representatives includes five Delegates from the District of Columbia and outlying territories elected to two-year terms and one Resident Commissioner of Puerto Rico elected to a four-year term (for which the last election was held in 2008, so the seat was not up for reelection in 2010). These delegates are not allowed to vote on the floor of the House of Representatives.

| District | | Incumbent | | Results | Candidates |
| District | Representative | Party | First elected | Results | Candidates |
|---|---|---|---|---|---|
| American Samoa at-large | Eni Faleomavaega | Democratic | 1988 | Incumbent re-elected. | ▌ ✓ Eni Faleomavaega (Democratic) 56.3%; ▌Amata Coleman Radewagen (Republican) 40.5%; ▌Tuika Tuika (Independent) 3.2% |
| District of Columbia at-large | Eleanor Holmes Norton | Democratic | 1990 | Incumbent re-elected. | ▌ ✓ Eleanor Holmes Norton (Democratic) 88.9%; ▌Marjorie Reilly Smith (Republican) 6.1%; ▌Rick Tingling-Clemmons (Statehood Green) 3.3%; ▌Queen Noble (Independent) 0.6% |
| Guam at-large | Madeleine Bordallo | Democratic | 2002 | Incumbent re-elected. | ▌ ✓ Madeleine Bordallo (Democratic); Uncontested |
| Northern Mariana Islands at-large | Gregorio Sablan | Independent | 2008 | Incumbent re-elected. | ▌ ✓ Gregorio Sablan (Independent) 43.2%; ▌Joe Camacho (Covenant) 24.2%; ▌Juan Babauta (Republican) 17.5%; ▌Jesus Borja (Democratic) 15.1% |
| U.S. Virgin Islands | Donna Christian-Christensen | Democratic | 1996 | Incumbent re-elected. | ▌ ✓ Donna Christian-Christensen (Democratic) 71.2%; ▌Jeffrey Moorhead (Independent) 18.7%; ▌Vincent Emile Danet (Republican) 8.5%; ▌Guillaume Mimoun (Independent) 1.5% |

== See also ==
- 2010 United States elections
  - 2010 United States gubernatorial elections
  - 2010 United States Senate elections
- 111th United States Congress
- 112th United States Congress
