= 2016 United States Senate election in Kansas =

- November 8, 2016
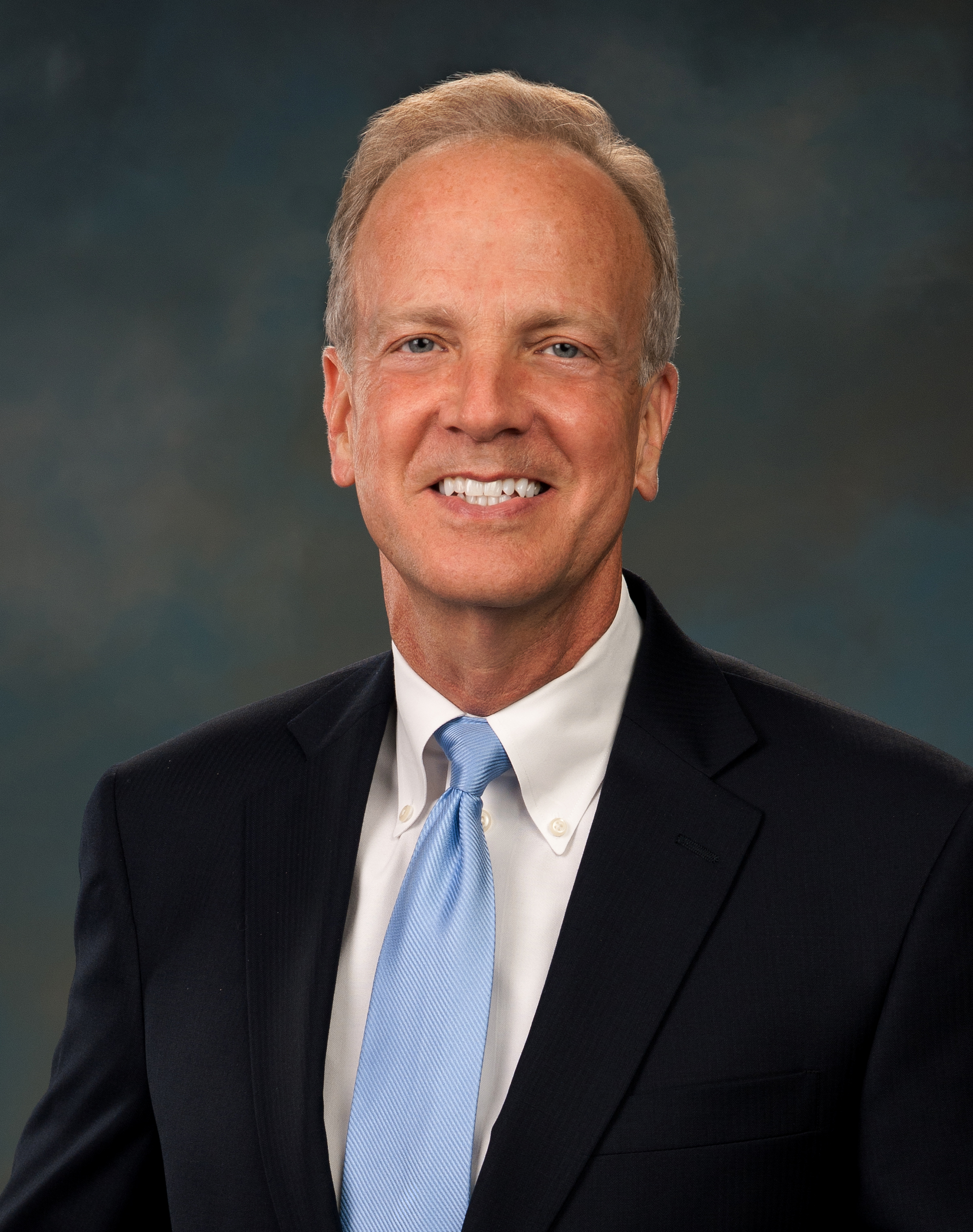

Nominee	Jerry Moran	Patrick Wiesner	Robert Garrard
Party	Republican	Democratic	Libertarian
Popular vote	732,376	379,740	65,760
Percentage	62.18%	32.24%	5.58%
- Moran: 40–50% 50–60% 60–70% 70–80% 80–90% >90% Wiesner: 40–50% 50–60% 60–70% 70–80% 80–90% >90% Tie: 40–50% 50% No data
U.S. senator before election
Jerry Moran
Republican
Elected U.S. Senator
Jerry Moran
Republican

The 2016 United States Senate election in Kansas was held on November 8, 2016, to elect a member of the United States Senate to represent the State of Kansas, concurrently with the 2016 U.S. presidential election, other elections to the United States Senate in other states, elections to the United States House of Representatives, and various state and local elections. The primaries were held on August 2.

Incumbent Republican Senator Jerry Moran won re-election to a second term in office.

== Republican primary ==
=== Candidates ===
==== Declared ====
- Jerry Moran, incumbent senator
- D.J. Smith, former Osawatomie city councilwoman and candidate for the U.S. Senate in 2014

==== Declined ====
- Tim Huelskamp, U.S. representative
- Mike Pompeo, U.S. representative
- Todd Tiahrt, former U.S. representative and candidate for the U.S. Senate in 2010
- Milton Wolf, radiologist and candidate for the U.S. Senate in 2014

=== Polling ===
Poll source	Date(s) administered	Sample size	Margin of error	Jerry Moran	Dennis Pyle	Milton Wolf	Undecided
Public Opinion Strategies (R-Moran)	February 28 – March 3, 2015	500	± 4.38%	73%	9%	—	18%
Public Opinion Strategies (R-Moran)	February 28 – March 3, 2015	500	± 4.38%	70%	—	18%	12%

=== Results ===
Republican primary results
Party	Candidate	Votes	%
Republican	Jerry Moran (incumbent)	230,907	79.09%
Republican	D. J. Smith	61,056	20.91%
Total votes		291,963	100.00%

== Democratic primary ==
=== Candidates ===
==== Declared ====
- Monique Singh-Bey, member of Universal African Peoples Organization
- Patrick Wiesner, attorney and candidate for the U.S. Senate in 2010 and 2014

==== Declined ====
- Carl Brewer, former mayor of Wichita
- Paul Davis, former minority leader of the Kansas House of Representatives and nominee for governor of Kansas in 2014
- Jill Docking, businesswoman, former member of the Kansas Board of Regents, nominee for the U.S. Senate in 1996 and nominee for lieutenant governor in 2014
- Dan Glickman, former U.S. representative and former United States secretary of agriculture
- Greg Orman, businessman and independent candidate for the U.S. Senate in 2014
- Joe Reardon, former mayor of Kansas City and Wyandotte County
- Kathleen Sebelius, former U.S. secretary of health and human services and former governor of Kansas
- Jim Slattery, former U.S. representative and nominee for U.S. Senate in 2008
- Margie Wakefield, attorney and nominee for Kansas's 2nd congressional district in 2014

=== Results ===
Results by county: Wiesner: 50–60%; 60–70%; 70–80%; 80–90%; Singh-Bey: 60–70%

Democratic primary results
Party	Candidate	Votes	%
Democratic	Patrick Wiesner	59,522	62.94%
Democratic	Monique Singh-Bey	35,042	37.06%
Total votes		94,564	100.00%

== Libertarian primary ==
=== Candidates ===
==== Declared ====
- Robert Garrard, nominee for KS-02 in 2008

Libertarian primary results
Party	Candidate	Votes	%
Libertarian	Robert Garrard		100.00%
Total votes			100.00%

== Independent ==
=== Candidates ===
==== Declined ====
- Greg Orman, businessman and Independent candidate for the U.S. Senate in 2014

== General election ==
=== Predictions ===
Source	Ranking	As of
The Cook Political Report	Safe R	November 2, 2016
Sabato's Crystal Ball	Safe R	November 7, 2016
Rothenberg Political Report	Safe R	November 3, 2016
Daily Kos	Safe R	November 8, 2016
Real Clear Politics	Safe R	November 7, 2016

=== Polling ===
View source data.

Poll source	Date(s) administered	Sample size	Margin of error	Jerry Moran (R)	Patrick Wiesner (D)	Robert Garrard (L)	Undecided
SurveyMonkey	November 1–7, 2016	1,311	± 4.6%	59%	37%	—	4%
SurveyMonkey	October 31–November 6, 2016	1,139	± 4.6%	58%	38%	—	4%
Fort Hays State University	November 1–3, 2016	313	± 3.5%	77%	13%	10%	0%
SurveyMonkey	October 28–November 3, 2016	1,162	± 4.6%	58%	38%	—	4%
SurveyMonkey	October 27–November 2, 2016	1,123	± 4.6%	57%	38%	—	5%
SurveyMonkey	October 26–November 1, 2016	1,164	± 4.6%	57%	38%	—	5%
SurveyMonkey	October 25–31, 2016	1,273	± 4.6%	56%	39%	—	5%
KSN News/SurveyUSA	October 26–30, 2016	596	± 4.1%	55%	31%	6%	8%
KSN News/SurveyUSA	October 11–15, 2016	549	± 4.2%	56%	31%	5%	8%
KSN News/SurveyUSA	September 6–11, 2016	565	± 4.2%	50%	34%	6%	11%
KSN News/SurveyUSA	August 3–7, 2016	566	± 4.2%	52%	32%	6%	10%
KSN News/SurveyUSA	July 8–11, 2016	537	± 4.3%	52%	33%	—	15%

Hypothetical polling

with Monique Singh-Bey

Poll source	Date(s) administered	Sample size	Margin of error	Jerry Moran (R)	Monique Singh-Bey (D)	Undecided
KSN News/SurveyUSA	July 8–11, 2016	537	± 4.3%	54%	30%	15%

with Kathleen Sebelius

Poll source	Date(s) administered	Sample size	Margin of error	Jerry Moran (R)	Kathleen Sebelius (D)	Undecided
Public Policy Polling	September 11–14, 2014	1,328	± 2.7%	52%	37%	11%

=== Results ===
2016 United States Senate election in Kansas
Party	Candidate	Votes	%	±%
Republican	Jerry Moran (incumbent)	732,376	62.18%	−7.91%
Democratic	Patrick Wiesner	379,740	32.24%	+5.86%
Libertarian	Robert D. Garrard	65,760	5.58%	+3.44%
Independent	DJ Smith (write-in)	46	0.00%	N/A
Total votes		1,177,922	100.0%	N/A
Republican hold				

==== By county ====
County	Jerry Moran Republican		Patrick Wiesner Democratic		All others		Margin		Total
County	#	%	#	%	#	%	#	%	Total
Allen	3,889	72.0%	1,192	23.9%	321	5.9%	2,697	48.1%	5,402
Anderson	2,426	73.4%	717	21.7%	161	4.9%	1,709	51.7%	3,304
Atchison	4,295	65.9%	1,917	29.4%	301	4.6%	2,378	36.5%	6,513
Barber	1,836	82.5%	275	12.4%	114	5.1%	1,561	70.1%	2,225
Barton	8,321	81.8%	1,308	12.9%	543	5.3%	7,013	68.9%	10,172
Bourbon	4,427	72.8%	1,308	21.5%	347	5.7%	3,119	51.3%	6,082
Brown	3,105	76.7%	751	18.6%	191	4.7%	2,354	58.1%	4,047
Butler	19,705	71.6%	5,915	21.5%	1,908	6.9%	13,790	50.1%	27,528
Chase	1,021	74.3%	271	19.7%	83	6.0%	750	54.6%	1,375
Chautauqua	1,186	81.1%	198	13.5%	79	5.4%	988	67.6%	1,463
Cherokee	5,938	69.4%	2,165	25.3%	449	5.3%	3,773	44.1%	8,552
Cheyenne	1,227	87.6%	125	8.9%	48	3.4%	1,102	78.7%	1400
Clark	840	84.5%	103	10.4%	51	5.1%	737	74.1%	994
Clay	3,250	84.8%	419	10.9%	162	4.2%	2,831	73.7%	3,831
Cloud	3,089	79.1%	597	15.3%	219	5.6%	2,492	63.8%	3,905
Coffey	3,146	78.2%	604	15.0%	275	6.8%	2,542	63.2%	4,025
Comanche	732	84.5%	98	11.3%	36	4.2%	634	73.2%	866
Cowley	8,530	67.9%	3,286	26.1%	755	6.0%	5,244	41.8%	12,571
Crawford	8,957	60.5%	5,065	34.2%	780	5.3%	3,892	26.3%	14,802
Decatur	1,237	87.2%	127	9.0%	54	3.8%	1,110	78.2%	1,418
Dickinson	6,368	77.9%	1,273	15.6%	532	6.5%	5,095	62.3%	8,173
Doniphan	2,538	77.0%	602	18.3%	156	4.7%	1,936	58.7%	3,296
Douglas	17,563	34.9%	30,436	60.5%	2,330	4.6%	-12,873	-25.6%	50,329
Edwards	1,078	81.5%	166	12.6%	78	5.9%	912	68.9%	1,322
Elk	1,012	81.0%	154	12.3%	83	6.6%	858	68.7%	1,249
Ellis	9,319	77.7%	2,211	18.4%	458	3.8%	7,108	59.3%	11,988
Ellsworth	2,199	81.6%	384	14.2%	112	4.2%	1,815	67.4%	2,695
Finney	7,165	71.3%	2,348	23.4%	540	5.4%	4,817	47.9%	10,053
Ford	5,530	72.9%	1,655	21.8%	405	5.3%	3,875	51.1%	7,590
Franklin	7,394	68.1%	2,735	25.2%	734	6.7%	4,659	42.9%	10,863
Geary	4,918	66.1%	2,187	29.4%	338	4.5%	2,731	36.7%	7,443
Gove	1,200	88.5%	117	8.6%	39	2.9%	1,083	79.9%	1,356
Graham	1,095	85.3%	135	10.5%	54	4.2%	960	74.8%	1,284
Grant	1,897	80.9%	316	13.5%	131	5.6%	1,581	67.4%	2,344
Gray	1,756	85.2%	222	10.8%	82	4.0%	1,534	74.6%	2,060
Greeley	570	88.9%	48	7.5%	23	3.6%	522	82.4%	641
Greenwood	2,164	77.2%	460	16.4%	178	6.4%	1,704	50.8%	2,802
Hamilton	729	84.5%	87	10.1%	47	5.4%	642	74.4%	863
Harper	2,021	80.3%	371	14.7%	126	5.0%	1,650	65.6%	2,518
Harvey	9,815	66.0%	4,237	28.5%	825	5.5%	5,578	37.5%	14,877
Haskell	1,137	84.6%	158	11.8%	49	3.6%	979	72.8%	1,344
Hodgeman	889	87.8%	83	8.2%	40	4.0%	806	79.6%	1,012
Jackson	4,115	70.6%	1,425	24.4%	291	5.0%	2,690	46.2%	5,831
Jefferson	5,456	65.2%	2,504	29.9%	404	4.8%	2,952	35.3%	8,364
Jewell	1,263	86.1%	127	8.7%	77	5.2%	1,136	77.4%	1,467
Johnson	160,074	55.4%	112,283	38.9%	16,345	5.7%	47,791	16.5%	288,702
Kearny	1,132	84.2%	161	12.0%	51	3.8%	971	72.2%	1,344
Kingman	2,661	79.7%	490	14.7%	186	5.6%	2,171	65.0%	3,337
Kiowa	950	88.0%	83	7.7%	47	4.4%	867	80.3%	1,080
Labette	5,212	64.8%	2,319	28.8%	508	6.3%	2,893	36.0%	8,039
Lane	763	86.6%	79	9.0%	39	4.4%	684	77.6%	881
Leavenworth	18,287	60.4%	10,171	33.6%	1,809	5.9%	8,116	26.8%	30,267
Lincoln	1,234	83.9%	167	11.4%	69	4.7%	1,067	72.5%	1,470
Linn	3,261	75.1%	796	18.3%	284	6.5%	2,465	56.8%	4,341
Logan	1,197	88.9%	106	7.9%	43	3.2%	1,091	81.0%	1,346
Lyon	7,925	64.4%	3,760	30.6%	618	5.0%	4,165	33.8%	12,303
Marion	4,490	79.4%	913	16.2%	249	4.4%	3,577	53.2%	5,652
Marshall	3,591	77.2%	867	18.6%	191	4.1%	2,724	58.6%	4,649
McPherson	9,637	75.4%	2,527	19.8%	613	4.8%	7,110	55.6%	12,777
Meade	1,491	87.1%	158	9.2%	63	3.7%	1,333	77.9%	1,712
Miami	10,448	69.9%	3,773	25.3%	716	4.8%	6,675	44.6%	14,937
Mitchell	2,463	84.6%	336	11.5%	114	3.9%	2,127	73.1%	2,913
Montgomery	8,232	69.5%	2,702	22.8%	919	7.8%	5,530	46.7%	11,853
Morris	2,087	79.2%	420	15.9%	129	4.9%	1,667	63.3%	2,636
Morton	1,010	85.2%	108	9.1%	68	5.7%	902	76.1%	1,186
Nemaha	4,294	83.8%	667	13.0%	165	3.2%	3,627	70.8%	5,126
Neosho	4,378	70.0%	1,427	22.8%	446	7.1%	2,951	47.2%	6,251
Ness	1,290	89.5%	109	7.6%	43	3.0%	1,181	81.9%	1,442
Norton	1,895	84.5%	238	10.6%	110	4.9%	1,657	73.9%	2,243
Osage	4,977	70.0%	1,636	23.0%	494	7.0%	3,341	47.0%	7,107
Osborne	1,521	84.8%	188	10.5%	85	4.7%	1,333	74.3%	1,794
Ottawa	2,316	80.2%	354	12.3%	217	7.5%	1,962	67.9%	2,887
Pawnee	2,108	78.7%	432	16.1%	137	5.1%	1,676	62.6%	2,677
Phillips	2,316	87.7%	211	8.0%	114	4.3%	2,105	79.7%	2,641
Pottawatomie	8,407	78.4%	1,829	17.1%	490	4.6%	6,578	61.3%	10,726
Pratt	3,019	78.7%	602	15.7%	216	5.6%	2,417	63.0%	3,837
Rawlins	1,263	85.9%	126	8.6%	81	5.5%	1,137	77.3%	1,470
Reno	17,218	70.9%	5,532	22.8%	1,547	6.4%	11,686	48.1%	24,297
Republic	2,117	84.6%	274	11.0%	110	4.4%	1,843	73.6%	2,501
Rice	2,979	78.0%	611	16.0%	230	6.0%	2,368	62.0%	3,820
Riley	13,438	62.1%	7,170	33.1%	1,027	4.7%	6,268	29.0%	21,635
Rooks	2,104	87.3%	192	8.0%	114	4.7%	1,912	79.3%	2,410
Rush	1,281	84.9%	169	11.2%	59	3.9%	1,112	73.7%	1,509
Russell	2,635	83.0%	380	12.0%	159	5.0%	2,255	71.0%	3,174
Saline	15,123	69.0%	5,117	23.3%	1,675	7.6%	10,006	45.7%	21,915
Scott	1,902	87.1%	187	8.6%	94	4.3%	1,715	80.5%	2,183
Sedgwick	112,455	60.2%	62,816	33.6%	11,539	6.2%	49,639	26.6%	186,110
Seward	3,168	67.2%	1,213	25.7%	335	7.1%	1,955	41.5%	4,716
Shawnee	41,689	54.8%	30,925	40.7%	3,422	4.5%	10,764	14.1%	76,036
Sheridan	1,201	88.4%	119	8.8%	38	2.8%	1,082	79.6%	1,358
Sherman	2,158	83.7%	296	11.5%	123	4.8%	1,862	72.2%	2,577
Smith	1,744	85.1%	219	10.7%	86	4.2%	1,525	74.4%	2,049
Stafford	1,563	83.4%	230	12.3%	80	4.3%	1,333	71.1%	1,873
Stanton	506	81.6%	78	12.6%	36	5.8%	428	69.0%	620
Stevens	1,600	86.8%	169	9.2%	75	4.1%	1,431	77.6%	1,844
Sumner	6,825	71.0%	2,124	22.1%	670	7.0%	4,701	48.9%	9,619
Thomas	3,012	84.2%	417	11.7%	147	4.1%	2,595	72.5%	3,576
Trego	1,202	81.9%	203	13.8%	62	4.2%	999	68.1%	1,467
Wabaunsee	2,580	75.9%	619	18.2%	199	5.9%	1,961	57.7%	3,398
Wallace	733	92.3%	35	4.4%	26	3.3%	698	87.9%	794
Washington	2,341	85.6%	285	10.4%	110	4.0%	2,056	75.2%	2,736
Wichita	793	83.7%	114	12.0%	40	4.2%	679	71.7%	947
Wilson	2,806	78.8%	544	15.3%	212	6.0%	2,262	63.5%	3,562
Woodson	1,063	75.3%	257	18.2%	92	6.5%	806	57.1%	1,412
Wyandotte	15,863	33.6%	28,525	60.4%	2,831	6.0%	-12,662	-26.8%	47,219
Totals	732,376	62.2%	379,740	32.2%	65,806	5.6%	352,636	30.0%	1,177,922

==== By congressional district ====
Moran won all four congressional districts.

District	Moran	Wiesner	Garrard	Representative
1st	76%	19%	5%	Roger Marshall
2nd	59%	36%	5%	Lynn Jenkins
3rd	53%	42%	6%	Kevin Yoder
4th	64%	30%	6%	Mike Pompeo
