= Committee on Veterans' Affairs =

Committee on Veterans' Affairs can refer to:

- United States House Committee on Veterans' Affairs
- United States Senate Committee on Veterans' Affairs
