= CJS Subcommittee =

CJS Subcommittee may refer to:

- United States House Appropriations Subcommittee on Commerce, Justice, Science, and Related Agencies
- United States Senate Appropriations Subcommittee on Commerce, Justice, Science, and Related Agencies
