= Senator Norvell =

Senator Norvell may refer to:

- John Norvell (1789–1850), U.S. Senator from Maryland
- Joseph Norvell (born 1950), Kansas State Senate
