= 2004 United States House of Representatives elections in Kansas =

- November 2, 2004

All 4 Kansas seats to the United States House of Representatives
	Majority party	Minority party
Party	Republican	Democratic
Last election	3	1
Seats won	3	1
Seat change	Steady	Steady
Popular vote	723,794	386,970
Percentage	62.59%	33.46%
Swing	▼2.00%	▲2.14%

Republican
50–60%
60–70%
70–80%
80–90%
>90%
Democratic
50–60%
70–80%

The 2004 United States House of Representatives elections in Kansas were held on November 2, 2004, to determine who will represent the state of Kansas in the United States House of Representatives. Kansas has four seats in the House, apportioned according to the 2000 United States census. Representatives are elected for two-year terms.

== Overview ==
United States House of Representatives elections in Kansas, 2004
Party	Votes	Percentage	Seats	+/–
Republican	723,794	62.59%	3	-
Democratic	386,970	33.46%	1	-
Libertarian	42,663	3.69%	0	-
Reform	2,956	0.26%	0	-
Totals	1,156,383	100.00%	4	-

== District 1 ==
2004 Kansas's 1st congressional district election

Nominee	Jerry Moran	Jack Warner
Party	Republican	Libertarian
Popular vote	239,776	24,517
Percentage	90.7%	9.3%
U.S. Representative before election
Jerry Moran
Republican
Elected U.S. Representative
Jerry Moran
Republican

=== Predictions ===
Source	Ranking	As of
The Cook Political Report	Safe R	October 29, 2004
Sabato's Crystal Ball	Safe R	November 1, 2004

Results

Kansas's 1st congressional district election, 2004
Party	Candidate	Votes	%
Republican	Jerry Moran	239,776	90.72%
Libertarian	Jack Warner	24,517	9.28%
Total votes		264,293	100.00%

== District 2 ==
2004 Kansas's 2nd congressional district election
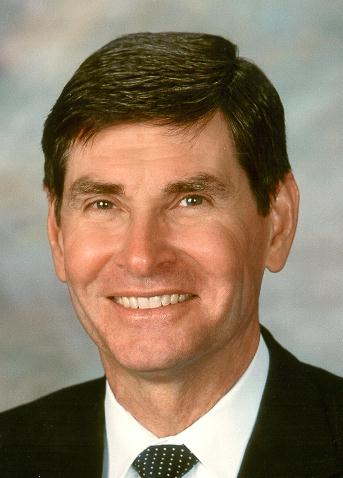

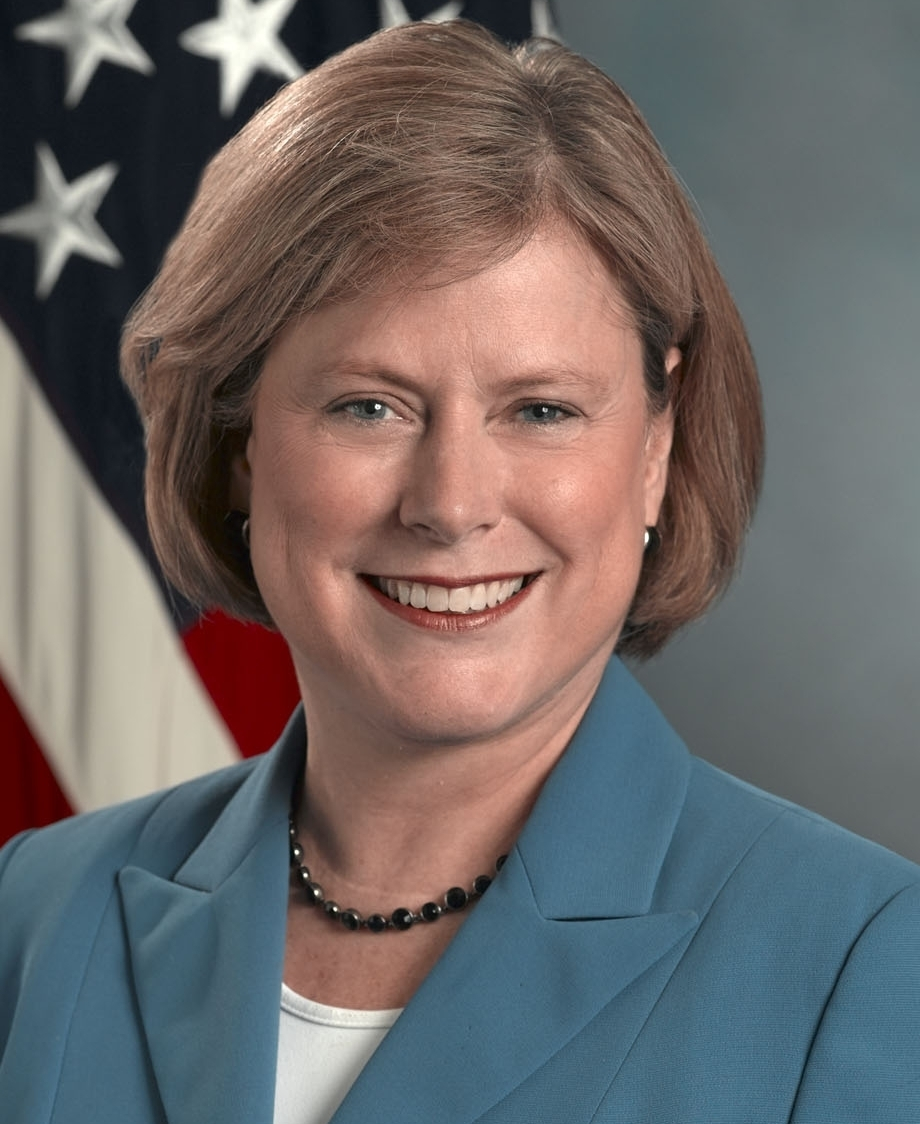
Nominee	Jim Ryun	Nancy Boyda
Party	Republican	Democratic
Popular vote	165,325	121,532
Percentage	56.1%	41.3%
- County results Ryun: 40–50% 50–60% 60–70% 70–80% Boyda: 50–60%
U.S. Representative before election
Jim Ryun
Republican
Elected U.S. Representative
Jim Ryun
Republican

=== Predictions ===
Source	Ranking	As of
The Cook Political Report	Likely R	October 29, 2004
Sabato's Crystal Ball	Safe R	November 1, 2004

Results

Kansas's 2nd congressional district election, 2004
Party	Candidate	Votes	%
Republican	Jim Ryun	165,325	56.15%
Democratic	Nancy Boyda	121,532	41.28%
Libertarian	Dennis Hawver	7,579	2.57%
Total votes		294,436	100.00%

== District 3 ==
2004 Kansas's 3rd congressional district election

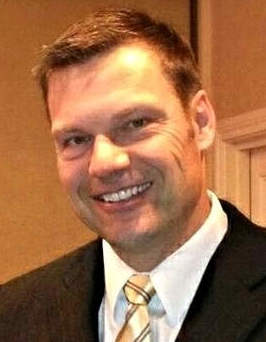
Nominee	Dennis Moore	Kris Kobach
Party	Democratic	Republican
Popular vote	184,050	145,542
Percentage	54.8%	43.4%
U.S. Representative before election
Dennis Moore
Democratic
Elected U.S. Representative
Dennis Moore
Democratic

=== Predictions ===
Source	Ranking	As of
The Cook Political Report	Lean D	October 29, 2004
Sabato's Crystal Ball	Lean D	November 1, 2004

Results

Kansas's 3rd congressional district election, 2004
Party	Candidate	Votes	%
Democratic	Dennis Moore	184,050	54.82%
Republican	Kris Kobach	145,542	43.35%
Libertarian	Joe Bellis	3,191	0.95%
Reform	Richard Wells	2,956	0.88%
Total votes		335,739	100.00%

== District 4 ==
2004 Kansas's 4th congressional district election
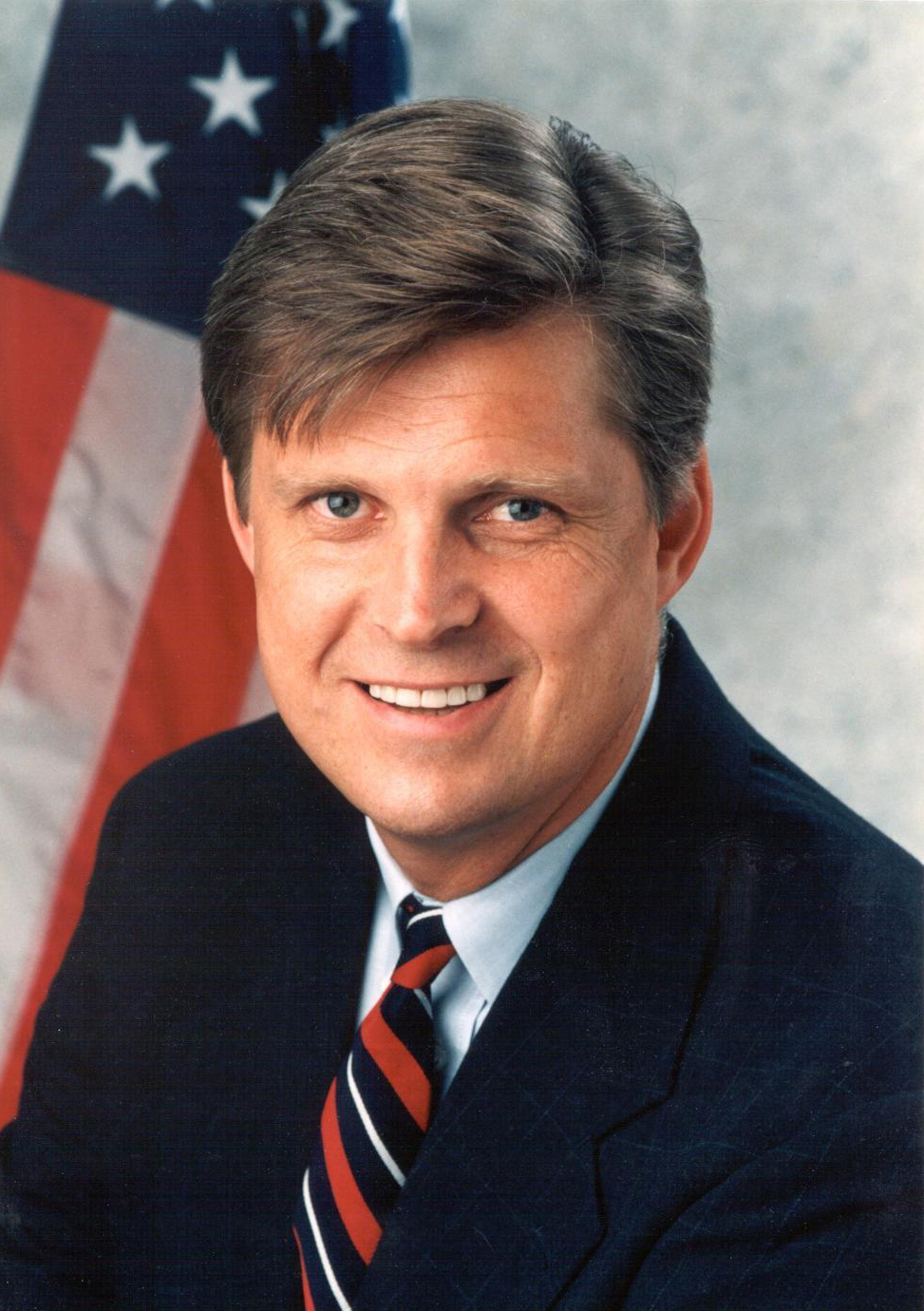

Nominee	Todd Tiahrt	Michael Kinard
Party	Republican	Democratic
Popular vote	173,151	81,388
Percentage	66.1%	31.1%
U.S. Representative before election
Todd Tiahrt
Republican
Elected U.S. Representative
Todd Tiahrt
Republican

=== Predictions ===
Source	Ranking	As of
The Cook Political Report	Safe R	October 29, 2004
Sabato's Crystal Ball	Safe R	November 1, 2004

Results

Kansas's 4th congressional district election, 2004
Party	Candidate	Votes	%
Republican	Todd Tiahrt	173,151	66.11%
Democratic	Michael Kinard	81,388	31.07%
Libertarian	David Loomis	7,376	2.82%
Total votes		261,915	100.00%
