= Jerry Moran =

American lawyer and politician (born 1954)

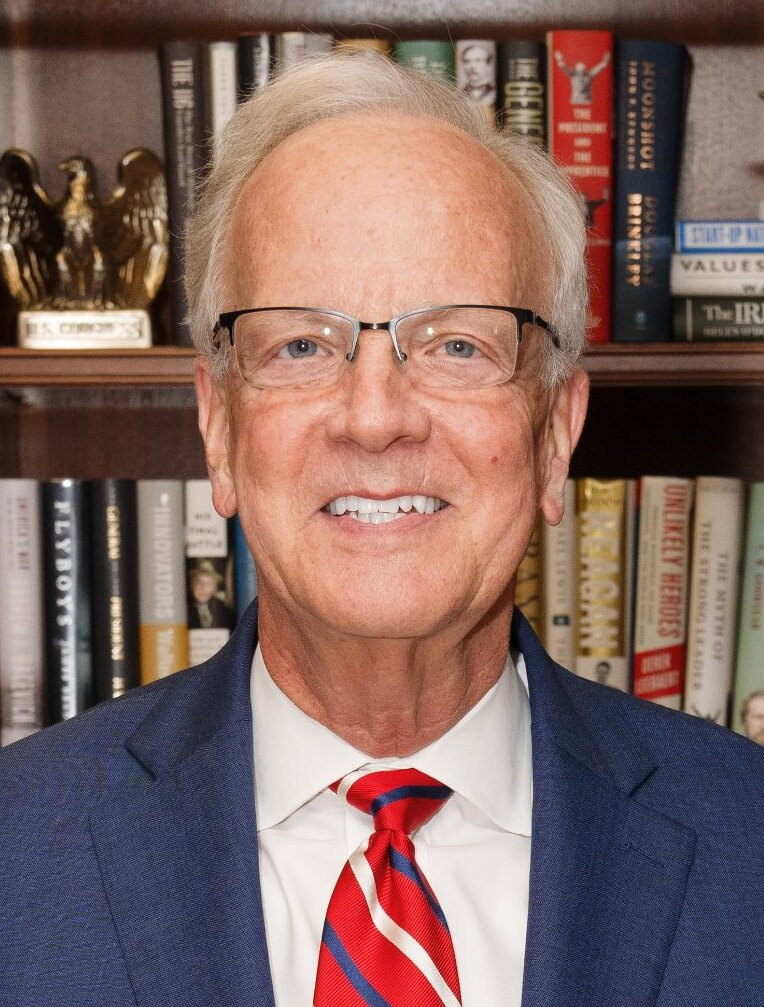
- Moran in 2024

United States Senator from Kansas
- Incumbent
- Assumed office January 3, 2011 Serving with Roger Marshall
- Preceded by: Sam Brownback
Committee positions
Chair of the Senate Veterans' Affairs Committee
Incumbent
Assumed office January 3, 2025
Preceded by	Jon Tester
In office January 6, 2020 – February 3, 2021
Preceded by	Johnny Isakson
Succeeded by	Jon Tester
Ranking Member of the Senate Veterans' Affairs Committee
In office February 3, 2021 – January 3, 2025
Preceded by	Jon Tester
Succeeded by	Richard Blumenthal
Chair of the National Republican Senatorial Committee
In office January 3, 2013 – January 3, 2015
Leader	Mitch McConnell
Preceded by	John Cornyn
Succeeded by	Roger Wicker

Member of the U.S. House of Representatives from Kansas's 1st district
- In office January 3, 1997 – January 3, 2011
- Preceded by: Pat Roberts
- Succeeded by: Tim Huelskamp

Member of the Kansas Senate from the 37th district
- In office January 3, 1989 – January 3, 1997
- Preceded by: Joseph Norvell
- Succeeded by: Larry D. Salmans

Personal details
- Born: Gerald Wesley Moran; May 29, 1954 (age 72) Great Bend, Kansas, U.S.
- Party: Republican
- Spouse: Robba Addison (m. 1984)
- Children: 2
- Education: Fort Hays State University (attended); University of Kansas (BS, JD)
- Website: Senate website Campaign website
- Moran's voice Moran on FAA modernization Recorded February 15, 2023

Gerald Wesley Moran (/mʌˈræn/ murr-AN; born May 29, 1954) is an American lawyer and politician who is the senior United States senator from Kansas, a seat he has held since 2011. Previously, he was a member of the United States House of Representatives and the Kansas Senate. He is a member of the Republican Party.

Raised in Plainville, Kansas, Moran graduated from the University of Kansas and the University of Kansas School of Law. He worked in private law and was the state special assistant attorney general (1982–1985) and deputy attorney of Rooks County (1987–1995). He served in the Kansas Senate from 1989 to 1997, serving as majority leader for his last two years. He was elected to the House of Representatives in 1996 and spent seven terms there with little electoral opposition. He was elected to the U.S. Senate in 2010 after defeating fellow U.S. representative Todd Tiahrt in a contentious primary. He was chair of the National Republican Senatorial Committee for the 113th U.S. Congress, leading Republican efforts in the 2014 elections. He was reelected to the Senate in 2016 and 2022.

Moran has been the dean of the Kansas congressional delegation since 2021, when Senator Pat Roberts retired.

== Early life, education, and career ==
Moran was born in Great Bend, Kansas, the son of Madeline Eleanor (née Fletcher) and Raymond Edwin "Ray" Moran. He was raised in Plainville. He attended Fort Hays State University before enrolling at the University of Kansas in Lawrence, where he earned a Bachelor of Science degree in economics in 1976. While attending the University of Kansas, he worked as a summer intern for U.S. representative Keith Sebelius in 1974, when impeachment proceedings were being prepared against President Richard Nixon.

Moran worked as a banker before receiving his Juris Doctor from the University of Kansas School of Law in 1982. He practiced law at Stinson, Mag & Fizzell in Kansas City, and later joined Jeter & Larson Law Firm in Hays, where he practiced for 15 years. In addition to his law practice, he served as the state special assistant attorney general (1982–1985) and deputy county attorney of Rooks County (1987–1995). He also served as an adjunct professor of political science at Fort Hays State University.

== Kansas Senate ==
Moran served eight years (1989–1997) in the Kansas Senate. He served two years as the vice president and his last two years as majority leader.

== U.S. House of Representatives ==
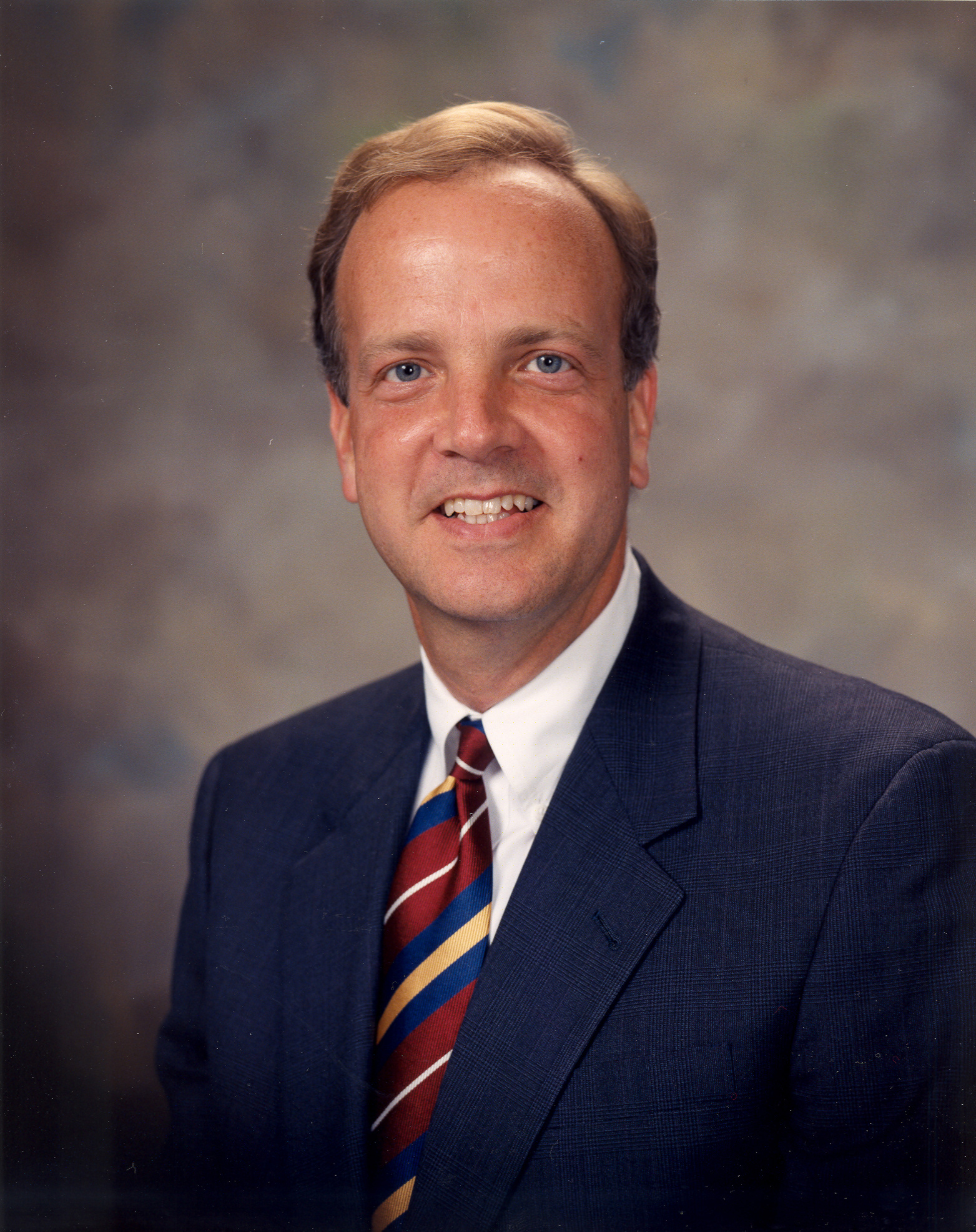
Moran's 109th Congress portrait

=== Elections ===
Moran was elected to Congress in 1996 and reelected six times, never facing serious opposition in the conservative 1st district. In 2006, his opponent was John Doll, against whom he received almost 79% of the vote—one of the highest totals for a Republican congressional incumbent in that election.

=== Tenure ===
During his time in the House of Representatives, Moran conducted an annual town hall meeting in each of the 69 counties in Kansas's "Big First" Congressional District.

As a senior member of the House Agriculture Committee, Moran worked with colleagues to craft legislation to aid Kansas farms and ranches. He was also an active member of the House Transportation and Infrastructure Committee and the House Veterans' Affairs Committee, where he served as chair of the Subcommittee on Health.

Slate's David Weigel wrote that, despite his insistence that earmarks are a way to get members of Congress to vote for spending "we can't afford", Moran requested $19.4 million in earmarks in the 2010 budget.

== U.S. Senate ==
=== Elections ===
==== 2010 ====
2010 Republican primary results Moran: 40–50%; 50–60%; 60–70%; 70–80%; 80–90%; Tiahrt: 40–50%; 50–60%; 60–70%

In 2010, Moran won the Republican nomination for U.S. Senate, defeating fellow Representative Todd Tiahrt 49.8%–44.6%.

In the general election, Moran defeated Democrat Lisa Johnston 70.09%–26.38%.

==== 2016 ====
In 2016, Moran won the Republican nomination for U.S. Senate, defeating former Osawatomie city councilwoman D. J. Smith 79.09%–20.91%.

In the general election, Moran defeated Democrat Patrick Wiesner 62.18%–32.24%, with Libertarian Robert Garrard receiving 5.58% of the vote.

==== 2022 ====
In 2022, Moran won the Republican nomination for U.S. Senate, defeating Joan Farr 80.47%–19.53%.

In the general election, Moran defeated Democrat Mark Holland 60.00%–37.04%.

=== Tenure ===
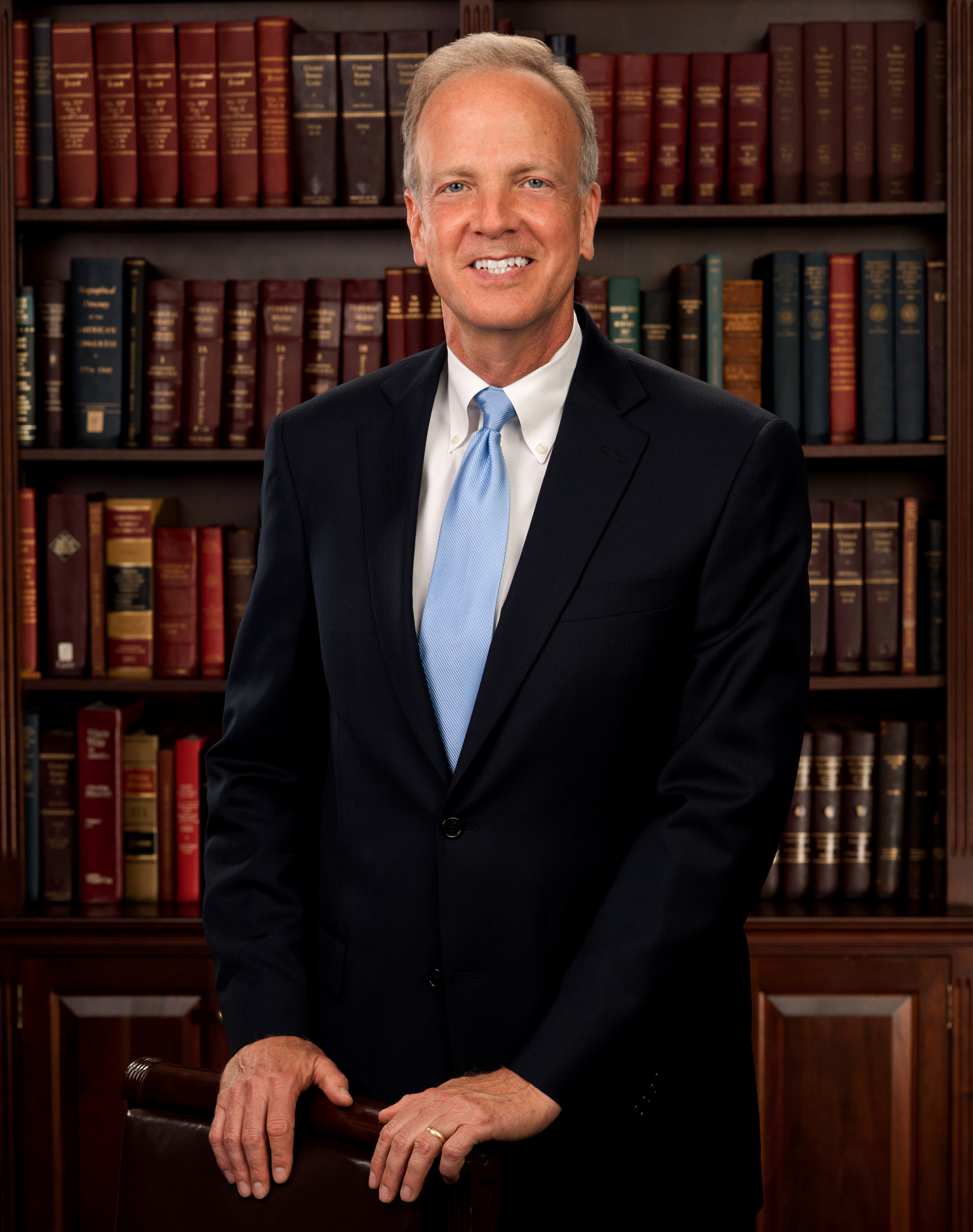
Moran's official Senate portrait, 2011

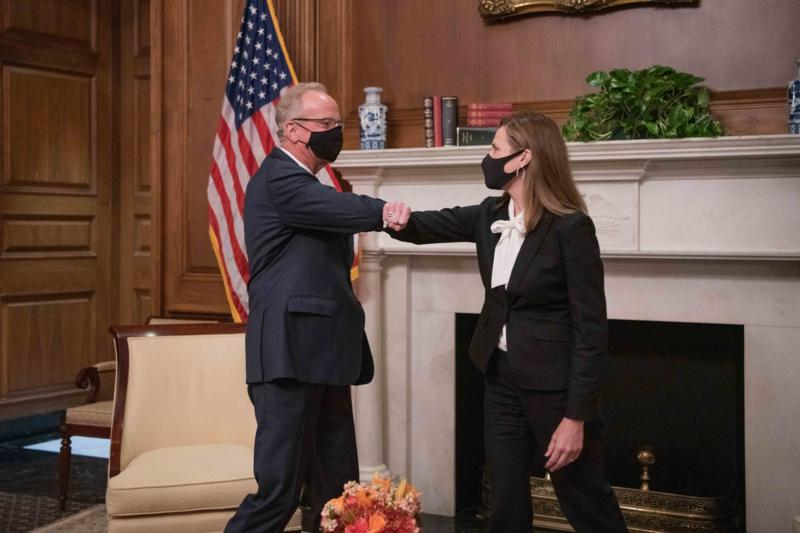
Moran meets with Supreme Court nominee Amy Coney Barrett in October 2020

Moran was elected chair of the National Republican Senatorial Committee for the 113th U.S. Congress on November 14, 2012. He oversaw the Republican gain of nine Senate seats in the 2014 United States Senate elections, resulting in the first Republican Senate majority since 2006.

On January 5, 2021, Moran announced that he would vote to certify the 2021 United States Electoral College vote count, which was to take place the following day. He was participating in the certification when Trump supporters attacked the United States Capitol. During the attack, Moran tweeted that he condemned "the violence and destruction at the U.S. Capitol in the strongest possible terms. It is completely unacceptable and unpatriotic."

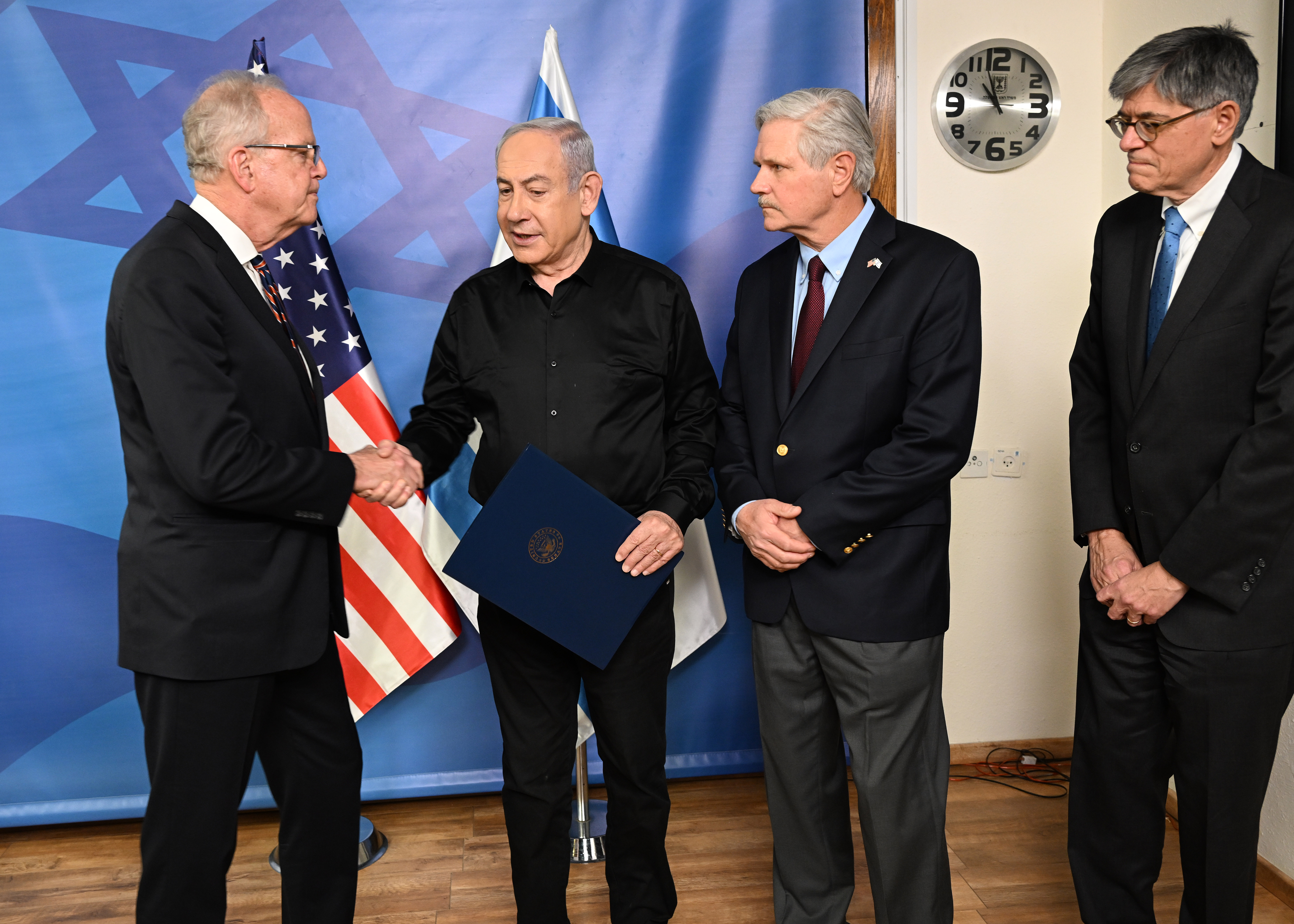
Moran with Israeli prime minister Benjamin Netanyahu in Israel, November 12, 2023

For his tenure as the chairman of the Senate Veterans' Affairs Committee in the 116th Congress, Moran earned an "F" grade from the nonpartisan Lugar Center's Congressional Oversight Hearing Index. In 2025, amid the Department of Government Efficiency's attempts to fire probationary workers in the Department of Veterans Affairs, Moran said he was asking whether the firing of VA workers would affect services for veterans. He said, "We've been reassured that it doesn't affect direct care, but we're looking for more information."

=== Committee assignments ===
Current:

- Select Committee on Intelligence
- Committee on Appropriations
  - Subcommittee on Agriculture, Rural Development, Food and Drug Administration, and Related Agencies
  - Subcommittee on Commerce, Justice, Science, and Related Agencies (Chair)
  - Subcommittee on Defense
  - Subcommittee on Labor, Health and Human Services, Education, and Related Agencies
  - Subcommittee on State, Foreign Operations, and Related Programs
  - Subcommittee on Transportation, Housing and Urban Development, and Related Agencies
- Committee on Commerce, Science, and Transportation
  - Subcommittee on Aviation, Space, and Innovation (Chair)
  - Subcommittee on Telecommunications and Media
  - Subcommittee on Consumer Protection, Technology, and Data Privacy
- Committee on Veterans' Affairs (Chair)
- Committee on Indian Affairs

Past:

- Committee on Environment and Public Works
- Committee on Health, Education, Labor and Pensions (117th Congress)

=== Caucus memberships ===
- Afterschool Caucuses
- Congressional Coalition on Adoption
- Rare Disease Caucus
- Senate Taiwan Caucus

== Political positions ==
Moran has a lifetime rating of 86 percent from the American Conservative Union and a lifetime 71 percent rating from the Club for Growth. In 2023, the Lugar Center ranked Moran eighth among senators for bipartisanship.

=== Agriculture ===
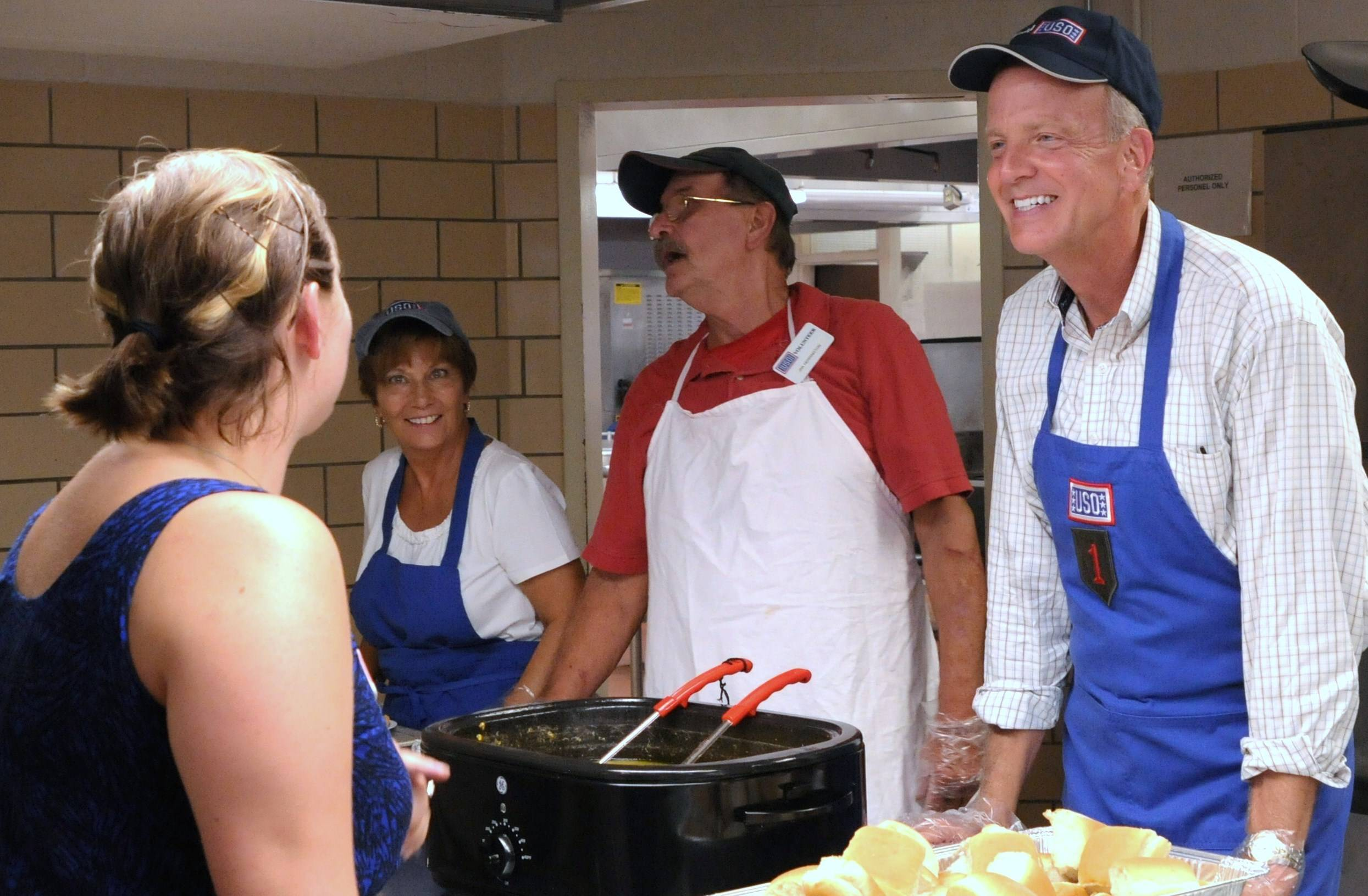
Jerry Moran (far right) assisting with a dinner at Fort Riley

In March 2019, Moran was one of 38 senators to sign a letter to Agriculture Secretary Sonny Perdue warning that dairy farmers "have continued to face market instability and are struggling to survive the fourth year of sustained low prices" and urging his department to "strongly encourage these farmers to consider the Dairy Margin Coverage program."

In May 2019, Moran was a cosponsor of the Transporting Livestock Across America Safely Act, a bipartisan bill introduced by Ben Sasse and Jon Tester intended to reform hours of service for livestock haulers by authorizing drivers to have the flexibility to rest at any point during their trip without it being counted against their hours of service and exempting loading and unloading times from the hours of service calculation of driving time.

=== Health care ===
Moran opposed the Medicare reform package of 2003, unlike most congressmen from rural districts. He also opposed the Affordable Care Act (Obamacare).

In May 2011, Moran sponsored S. 1058, the Pharmacy Competition and Consumer Choice Act of 2011. In the House, he served as co-chair of the House Rural Health Care Coalition and co-founder of the Congressional Community Pharmacy Coalition.

Moran voted against the July 2017 Senate health care bill. He criticized the closed-door process for developing the bill and criticized the legislation for not repealing the entire ACA.

=== National security and military ===
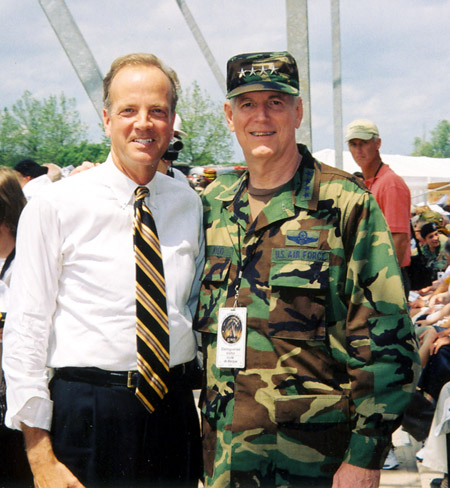
Congressman Jerry Moran and Chairman of the Joint Chiefs of Staff General Richard Myers at the 60th anniversary of the D-Day invasion in Normandy, France on June 6, 2004.

Since 2014, Moran has served on the United States Air Force Academy Board of Visitors.

In the early 2000s, Moran opposed a timetable for military withdrawal from Iraq.

Since entering Congress, Moran has traveled to Afghanistan, Iraq, and Pakistan to visit deployed American forces and meet with foreign leaders.

In March 2018, Moran was one of five Republican senators to vote against tabling a resolution spearheaded by Bernie Sanders, Chris Murphy, and Mike Lee that would have required President Trump to withdraw U.S. troops either in or influencing Yemen within the next 30 days unless they were combating Al-Qaeda. In October 2018, Moran was one of seven senators to sign a letter to Secretary of State Mike Pompeo saying that they found it "difficult to reconcile known facts with at least two" of the Trump administration's certifications that Saudi Arabia and the United Arab Emirates were attempting to protect Yemeni civilians and were in compliance with U.S. laws on arms sales, citing their lack of understanding for "a certification that the Saudi and Emirati governments are complying with applicable agreements and laws regulating defense articles when the [memo] explicitly states that, in certain instances, they have not done so." In June 2019, Moran was one of seven Republicans to vote to block Trump's Saudi arms deal providing weapons to Saudi Arabia, United Arab Emirates and Jordan, and one of five Republicans to vote against another 20 arms sales.

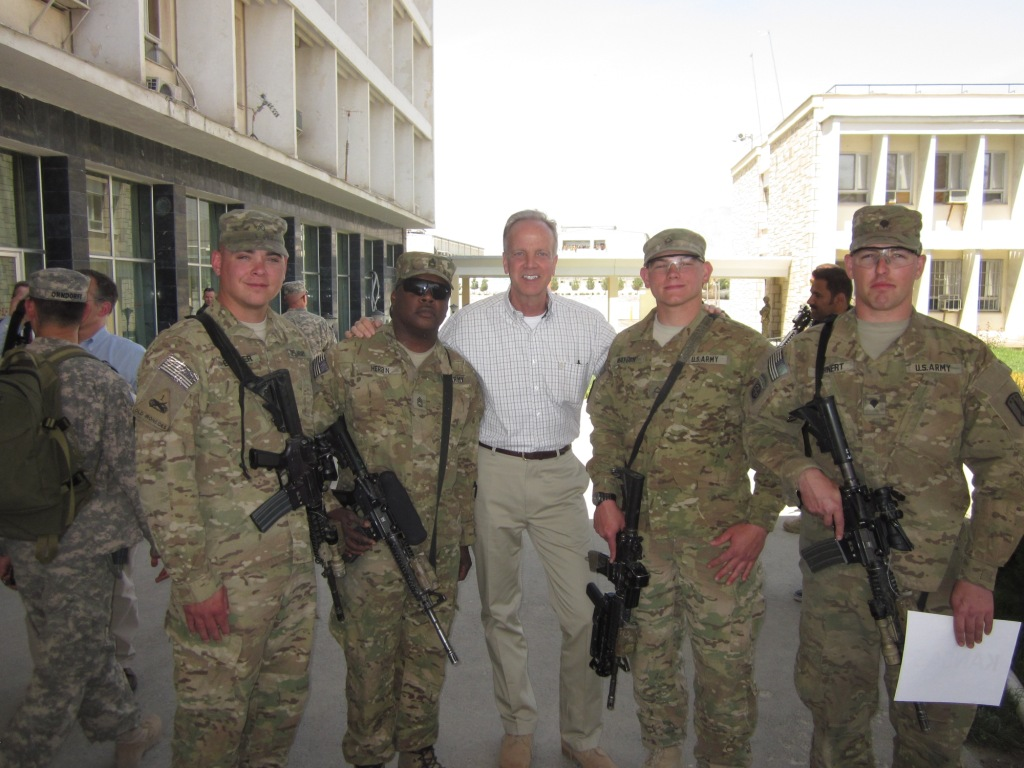
U.S. Senator Jerry Moran with Kansans serving in Afghanistan in April 2011.

In January 2019, Moran was one of 11 Republican senators to vote to advance legislation intended to block Trump's intent to lift sanctions against three Russian companies.

In February 2019, amid a report by the Commerce Department that ZTE had been caught illegally shipping goods of American origin to Iran and North Korea, Moran was one of seven senators to sponsor a bill reimposing sanctions on ZTE in the event that ZTE did not honor both American laws and its agreement with the Trump administration.

In July 2019, Moran was one of 16 Republican senators to send a letter to acting Office of Management and Budget (OMB) director Russell Vought, acting White House chief of staff Mick Mulvaney, and Treasury Secretary Steven Mnuchin encouraging them to work with them to prevent a continuing resolution "for FY 2020 that would delay the implementation of the President's National Defense Strategy (NDS) and increase costs" and writing that the yearlong continuing resolution suggested by administration officials would render the Defense Department "incapable of increasing readiness, recapitalizing our force, or rationalizing funding to align with the National Defense Strategy (NDS)."

=== Immigration and refugees ===
Moran critiqued Trump's 2017 executive order imposing a temporary ban on entry to the U.S. to citizens of seven Muslim-majority countries, saying, "While I support thorough vetting, I do not support restricting the rights of U.S. citizens and lawful permanent residents. Furthermore, far-reaching national security policy should always be devised in consultation with Congress and relevant government agencies."

In March 2019, Moran was one of 12 Republican senators to vote to block Trump's national emergency declaration that would have granted him access to $3.6 billion in military construction funding to build border barriers.

=== Economy ===
In May 2019, Moran was one of eight senators to cosponsor the Global Leadership in Advanced Manufacturing Act, a bill that would develop new institutes that supported American manufacturing in technology and grant more federal investment in the national network such as preexisting institutes being made to compete globally as well as continue American economic and national security.

=== Education ===
Moran supports accountability metrics for public schools, but believes federal initiatives need to provide flexibility to states. In 2001, Moran voted against the No Child Left Behind Act (NCLB) because he felt it did not afford sufficient flexibility to schools. In 2017, Moran voted to confirm Betsy DeVos as U.S. Secretary of Education.

=== Gun policy ===
Moran has an "A" grade from the NRA Political Victory Fund (NRA-PVF) for his consistent support of pro-gun policies. The NRA endorsed him in his 2010 Senate run. NRA-Political Victory Fund chair Chris W. Cox called Moran a "steadfast supporter of our freedom". Since 1998, the NRA has donated $23,850 to Moran's political efforts.

In 2013, Moran joined other Republicans in saying they would filibuster any Democrat's proposals that Republicans considered a threat to the Second Amendment. In April, he voted against the Manchin-Toomey proposal for universal background checks for gun purchases.

Moran supports the concept of eliminating gun-free zones on military installations and recruitment centers. He said that they are an "infringement on the constitutional rights of our service members" and that gun-free zones make military sites "increasingly vulnerable to those who wish to do harm."

In 2016, Moran voted against the Feinstein Amendment, which would have banned suspected terrorists from acquiring guns.

Moran responded to the 2017 Olathe, Kansas shooting: "I strongly condemn violence of any kind, especially if it is motivated by prejudice and xenophobia."

In January 2019, Moran was one of 31 Republican senators to cosponsor the Constitutional Concealed Carry Reciprocity Act, a bill introduced by John Cornyn and Ted Cruz that would grant individuals with concealed carry privileges in their home state the right to exercise this right in any other state with concealed carry laws while concurrently abiding by that state's laws.

=== Environment and climate change ===
As of 2017, based on his environment-related votes, Moran had a lifetime score of 8% from the League of Conservation Voters, and a 0% score for 2016.

In 2015 Moran voted against a Senate amendment acknowledging that human activity contributes to climate change. In 2016, Moran and several other Senate Republicans signed a letter calling upon the U.S. to withdraw funding from the United Nations Framework Convention on Climate Change. In 2009, Moran voted against the American Clean Energy and Security Act (Waxman-Markey), which would have established a cap-and-trade system to reduce carbon emissions and combat climate change.

Moran is a strong supporter of the construction of the Keystone XL oil pipeline. During the consideration of the Keystone XL pipeline legislation, he introduced an amendment to remove the lesser prairie-chicken from the list of threatened species. The amendment failed on a 54–44 vote, having failed to get the required 60 votes.

=== Entrepreneurship and startups ===
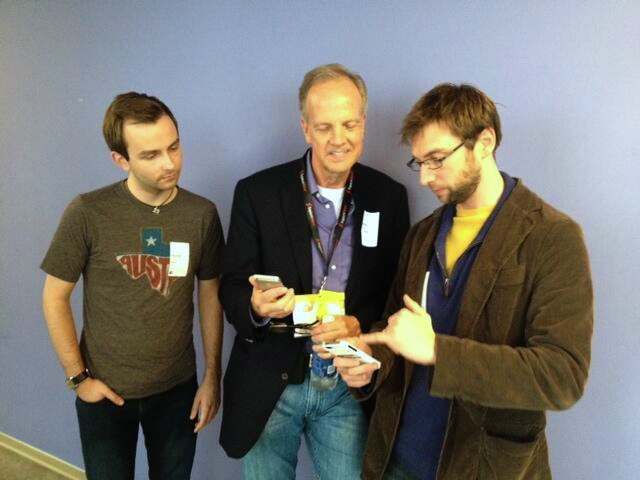
U.S. Senator Jerry Moran talking with entrepreneurs about their startup competing at the 2013 South by Southwest Accelerator competition.

Moran is "one of the most active members of Congress when it comes to reaching out to Silicon Valley." In 2014, Consumer Electronics Association President and CEO Gary J. Shapiro dubbed Moran "Mr. Innovation" and described him as "one of the biggest tech entrepreneurship leaders in the U.S. Senate." Moran is the lead sponsor of Startup Act 3.0 legislation, which includes several provisions that would reform the American visa system for high-skilled, American-educated, and entrepreneurial immigrants. Moran also sponsored the Jumpstart Our Business Startups Act, also known as the JOBS Act, legislation to expand crowdfunding options for startups. Since its 2012 passage, he has criticized the U.S. Securities and Exchange Commission's JOBS Act rule-making as drawn out and potentially counterproductive to the legislation's intent. Moran is an advocate of increased engagement between Washington and the Startup community and has spoken on the issue at events like South by Southwest (SXSW) and the Consumer Electronics Show (CES).

=== Internet issues ===
Moran opposed the Protect Intellectual Property Act (PIPA) and the Stop Online Piracy Act (SOPA). In November 2011, Moran, senators Rand Paul, Ron Wyden and Maria Cantwell sent a letter to Senate leadership indicating they would place a Senate hold on PIPA, citing the threats PIPA (and SOPA) posed to liberty and innovation.

In 2017, Moran voted to repeal FCC Internet privacy rules that blocked internet providers from sharing or selling data on customers' private data (such as browsing history) without the customer's permission.

=== Abortion ===
Moran opposes abortion. He has cosponsored legislation to ban abortions after the 20th week of pregnancy. He voted in favor of making harming a fetus a crime. Moran supported the 2022 overturning of Roe v. Wade, agreeing that the Constitution does not ensure right to an abortion.

=== LGBT rights ===
The Human Rights Campaign has rated his voting record on LGBT rights as zero in five separate scorecards.

=== Marijuana ===
Moran has a "D-" grade from the National Organization for the Reform of Marijuana Laws (NORML) for his voting history on cannabis-related causes.

=== Opioids ===
In September 2018, Moran voted for a package of 70 Senate bills that cost $8.4 billion and altered programs across multiple agencies, as part of a bipartisan effort to prevent opioids from being shipped through the U.S. Postal Service and to grant doctors the ability to prescribe medications designed to wean opioid addictions.

=== SafeSport ===
In February 2022, Moran said that every athlete-victim he had spoken to "had little or no confidence in SafeSport". He and Senator Richard Blumenthal said they believed that to protect young athletes, more transparency was required from SafeSport, which does not make public its investigative findings or arbitration decisions, and that SafeSport must make its work public.

=== January 6 commission ===
On May 28, 2021, Moran voted against creating an independent commission to investigate the January 6 United States Capitol attack.

== Personal life ==
Moran lived in Hays for most of his political career. In 2012, he moved to Manhattan to be closer to a major airport in order to cut down on his drive time back to Kansas each weekend. The nearest airport to Hays is Wichita Dwight D. Eisenhower National Airport, three hours southeast; Manhattan is two hours from Wichita and Kansas City. Additionally, Manhattan Regional Airport has direct jet service daily to and from Chicago and Dallas.

At Kansas State University, he was initiated into Alpha Tau Omega on September 28, 2013.

Moran volunteers his time with several community organizations. He is a former trustee of the Eisenhower Foundation, serves on the board of trustees of the Fort Hays State University Endowment Association, and serves on the Executive Committee of the Coronado Area Council of the Boy Scouts of America. He was also the 2008 Honorary Chair of the Law Enforcement Torch Run of the Kansas Special Olympics. Moran and his wife, Robba, have two daughters, Kelsey and Alex. Kelsey graduated from Kansas State University in 2010 and from Georgetown University Law Center in 2015. She is an attorney at Hogan Lovells. Alex studied at Kansas State University and graduated from Kansas State University College of Veterinary Medicine in 2016.

== Ratings from political organizations ==
In the first half of the 116th Congress, Moran received a score of 71 from the American Conservative Union, with an overall lifetime rating of nearly 86. Americans for Democratic Action gave Moran a score of 15% for the same period.

In the 118th Congress the American Conservative Union gave him a 69% rating, with an overall lifetime rating of 84%, while the Americans for Democratic Action gave him 25%.

== Electoral history ==
Kansas's 1st congressional district election (2002)
Party	Candidate	Votes	%
Republican	Jerry Moran (incumbent)	186,850	91.10
Libertarian	Jack Warner	18,250	8.90
Total votes		205,100	100.00
Turnout			
Republican hold			

Kansas's 1st congressional district election (2004)
Party	Candidate	Votes	%
Republican	Jerry Moran (incumbent)	239,776	90.72
Libertarian	Jack Warner	24,517	9.28
Total votes		264,293	100.00
Turnout			
Republican hold			

Kansas's 1st congressional district election (2006)
Party	Candidate	Votes	%
Republican	Jerry Moran (incumbent)	153,298	78.65
Democratic	John Doll	38,820	19.92
Reform	Sylvester Cain	2,792	1.43
Total votes		194,910	100.00
Turnout			
Republican hold			

Kansas's 1st congressional district election (2008)
Party	Candidate	Votes	%
Republican	Jerry Moran (incumbent)	214,549	81.88
Democratic	James Bordonaro	34,771	13.27
Reform	Kathleen Burton	7,145	2.73
Libertarian	Jack Warner	5,562	2.12
Total votes		262,027	100.00
Turnout			
Republican hold			

2010 U.S. Senate Republican primary results
Party	Candidate	Votes	%
Republican	Jerry Moran	161,407	49.81%
Republican	Todd Tiahrt	144,372	44.55%
Republican	Tom Little	10,104	3.12%
Republican	Bob Londerholm	8,168	2.52%
Total votes		324,051	100.00%

United States Senate election in Kansas, 2010
Party	Candidate	Votes	%	±%
Republican	Jerry Moran	578,768	70.34%	+1.18%
Democratic	Lisa Johnston	215,270	26.16%	−1.33%
Libertarian	Michael Dann	17,437	2.12%	+0.18%
Reform	Joe Bellis	11,356	1.38%	−0.04%
Majority		363,498	44.18%	
Total votes		822,831	100.00%	
Republican hold		Swing		

2016 U.S. Senate Republican primary results
Party	Candidate	Votes	%
Republican	Jerry Moran (incumbent)	230,907	79.09%
Republican	D.J. Smith	61,056	20.91%
Total votes		291,963	100.00%

United States Senate election in Kansas, 2016
Party	Candidate	Votes	%	±%
Republican	Jerry Moran (incumbent)	732,376	62.18%	−8.16%
Democratic	Patrick Wiesner	379,740	32.24%	+6.08%
Libertarian	Robert D. Garrard	65,760	5.58%	+3.46%
Independent	DJ Smith (write-in)	46	0.00%	N/A
Total votes		1,177,922	100.00%	N/A
Republican hold				

2022 U.S. Senate Republican primary results
Party	Candidate	Votes	%
Republican	Jerry Moran (incumbent)	383,332	80.5
Republican	Joan Farr	93,016	19.5
Total votes		476,348	100.0

United States Senate election in Kansas, 2022
Party	Candidate	Votes	%	±%
Republican	Jerry Moran (incumbent)	602,976	60.00%	−2.18%
Democratic	Mark Holland	372,214	37.04%	+4.80%
Libertarian	David Graham	29,766	2.96%	−2.62%
Total votes		1,004,956	100.00%	N/A
Republican hold				

== See also ==
- Kansas's congressional delegations

U.S. House of Representatives
Preceded by Pat Roberts	Member of the U.S. House of Representatives from Kansas's 1st congressional district 1997–2011	Succeeded by Tim Huelskamp
Party political offices
Preceded by Sam Brownback	Republican nominee for U.S. Senator from Kansas (Class 3); 2010, 2016, 2022	Most recent
Preceded by John Cornyn	Chair of the National Republican Senatorial Committee; 2013–2015	Succeeded by Roger Wicker
U.S. Senate
Preceded by Sam Brownback	United States Senator (Class 3) from Kansas; 2011–present Served alongside: Pat Roberts, Roger Marshall, Adam Hamilton (elect)	Incumbent
Preceded by Johnny Isakson	Chair of the Senate Veterans Affairs Committee; 2020–2021	Succeeded by Jon Tester
Preceded by Jon Tester	Ranking Member of the Senate Veterans Affairs Committee; 2021–2025	Succeeded by Dick Blumenthal
Preceded by Jon Tester	Chair of the Senate Veterans Affairs Committee; 2025–present	Incumbent
U.S. order of precedence (ceremonial)
Preceded by Ron Johnson	Order of precedence of the United States as United States Senator	Succeeded by John Hoeven
Preceded by Chris Coons	United States senators by seniority 26th	Succeeded by John Boozman
