= Startup Act 3.0 =

Startup Act 3.0 (S. 310) was legislation considered in the 113th Congress intended to encourage the growth and viability of startup companies in the United States through a series of changes to American tax, immigration, and regulatory policies. It is the third iteration of Startup Act legislation originally introduced into the United States Senate by Jerry Moran (R-KS) in 2011 and then reintroduced as Startup Act 2.0 by Moran and Mark Warner (D-VA) in 2012. The legislation has earned broad support from entrepreneurs and the technology industry. Provisions of the bill have been scored by economists as considerable vehicles of economic growth. It has bipartisan support in both chambers of Congress.

The legislation was reintroduced in the 114th Congress as "Startup Act", (S. 181).

== Sponsors ==
Senate bill (S. 310): Sen. Jerry Moran (R-KS), Sen. Mark Warner (D-VA), Sen. Chris Coons (D-DE), Sen. Roy Blunt (R-MO), Sen. Amy Klobuchar (D-MN), Sen. Tim Kaine (D-VA), Sen. Marco Rubio (R-FL).

House bill (H.R. 714): Rep. Michael Grimm, Rep. Loretta Sanchez, Rep. Steve Chabot, Rep. Gerald Connolly, Rep. Devin Nunes, Rep. Jared Polis, Rep. Kevin Yoder, Rep. Blake Farenthold, Rep. Patrick Murphy, Rep. Peter T. King, Rep. Alcee Hastings, Rep. Judy Chu, Rep. Jim Moran, Rep. David Valadao, Rep. Jared Huffman.

== Support ==
Reuters finance blogger Felix Salmon said the bill's entrepreneur visa provision is a "no-brainer" and "a great idea just because without it, the incentives are all wrong." Startup Act 3.0 has been considered a potential alternative to comprehensive immigration reform should the push for a comprehensive bill fall short in the 113th Congress.
