= 2008 United States House of Representatives elections in Kansas =

- November 4, 2008

All 4 Kansas seats to the United States House of Representatives
| | Majority party | Minority party |
|---|---|---|
| Party | Republican | Democratic |
| Last election | 2 | 2 |
| Seats won | 3 | 1 |
| Seat change | ▲1 | ▼1 |
| Popular vote | 690,005 | 470,031 |
| Percentage | 57.11% | 38.90% |
| Swing | ▲2.77% | ▼4.78% |

Republican
50–60%
60–70%
70–80%
80–90%
>90%
Democratic
40–50%
50–60%
60–70%
70–80%

The 2008 congressional elections in Kansas were held on November 4, 2008, to determine who would represent the state of Kansas in the United States House of Representatives, coinciding with the presidential and senatorial elections. Representatives are elected for two-year terms; those elected will serve in the 111th Congress from January 3, 2009, until January 3, 2011.

Kansas has four seats in the House, apportioned according to the 2000 United States census. Its 2007-2008 congressional delegation consisted of two Republicans and two Democrats. It became three Republicans and one Democrat after the elections as District 2 changed party from Democratic to Republican, although CQ Politics had forecasted districts 2 and 3 to be at some risk for the incumbent party. The primary elections for Republican Party and Democratic Party candidates were held on August 5.

== Overview ==
United States House of Representatives elections in Kansas, 2008
| Party | Votes | Percentage | Seats | +/– |
|---|---|---|---|---|
| Republican | 690,005 | 57.11% | 3 | +1 |
| Democratic | 470,031 | 38.90% | 1 | -1 |
| Libertarian | 25,663 | 2.12% | 0 | — |
| Reform | 22,603 | 1.87% | 0 | — |
| Totals | 1,208,302 | 100.00% | 4 | — |

== District 1 ==
2008 Kansas's 1st congressional district election

| Nominee | Jerry Moran | James Bordonaro |
| Party | Republican | Democratic |
| Popular vote | 214,549 | 34,771 |
| Percentage | 81.9% | 13.3% |
U.S. Representative before election
Jerry Moran
Republican
Elected U.S. Representative
Jerry Moran
Republican

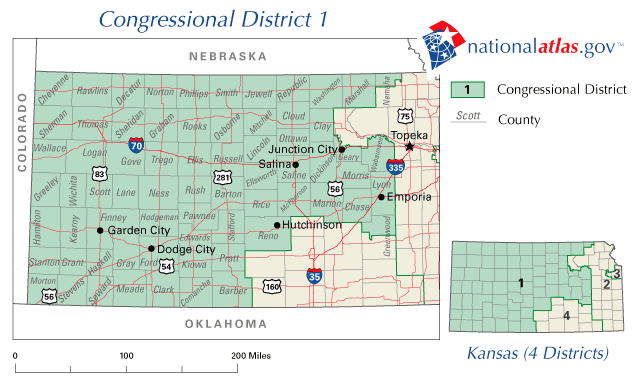

Incumbent Republican Jerry Moran won re-election, defeating Democratic nominee James Bordonaro and independents Kathleen Burton and Jack Warner.

=== Predictions ===
| Source | Ranking | As of |
|---|---|---|
| The Cook Political Report | Safe R | November 6, 2008 |
| Rothenberg | Safe R | November 2, 2008 |
| Sabato's Crystal Ball | Safe R | November 6, 2008 |
| Real Clear Politics | Safe R | November 7, 2008 |
| CQ Politics | Safe R | November 6, 2008 |

Kansas's 1st congressional district election, 2008
| Party | Candidate | Votes | % |
|---|---|---|---|
| Republican | Jerry Moran (incumbent) | 214,549 | 81.88 |
| Democratic | James Bordonaro | 34,771 | 13.27 |
| Reform | Kathleen M. Burton | 7,145 | 2.73 |
| Libertarian | Jack Warner | 5,562 | 2.12 |
| Total votes | | 262,027 | 100.00 |
| Republican hold | | | |

== District 2 ==
2008 Kansas's 2nd congressional district election
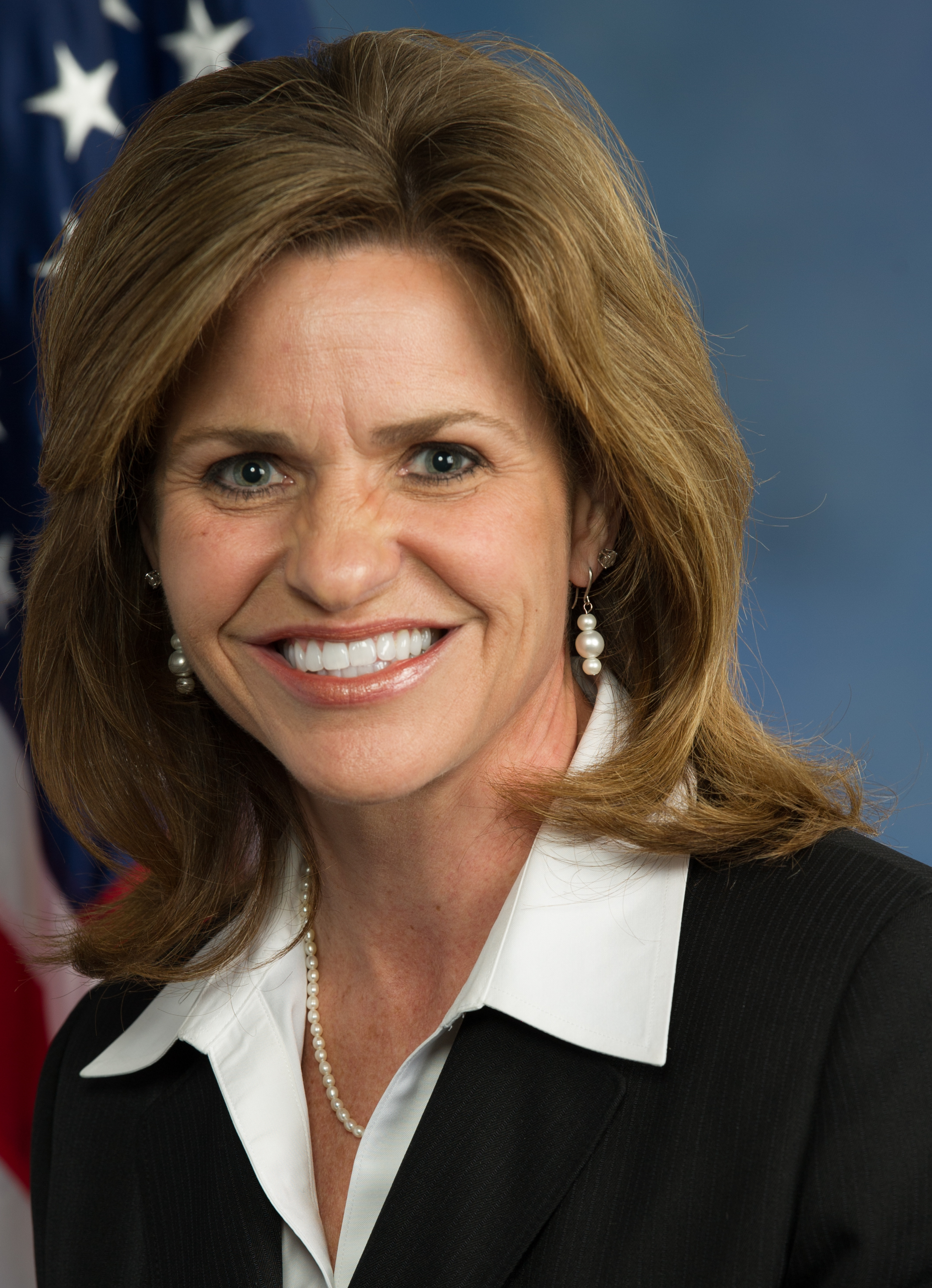

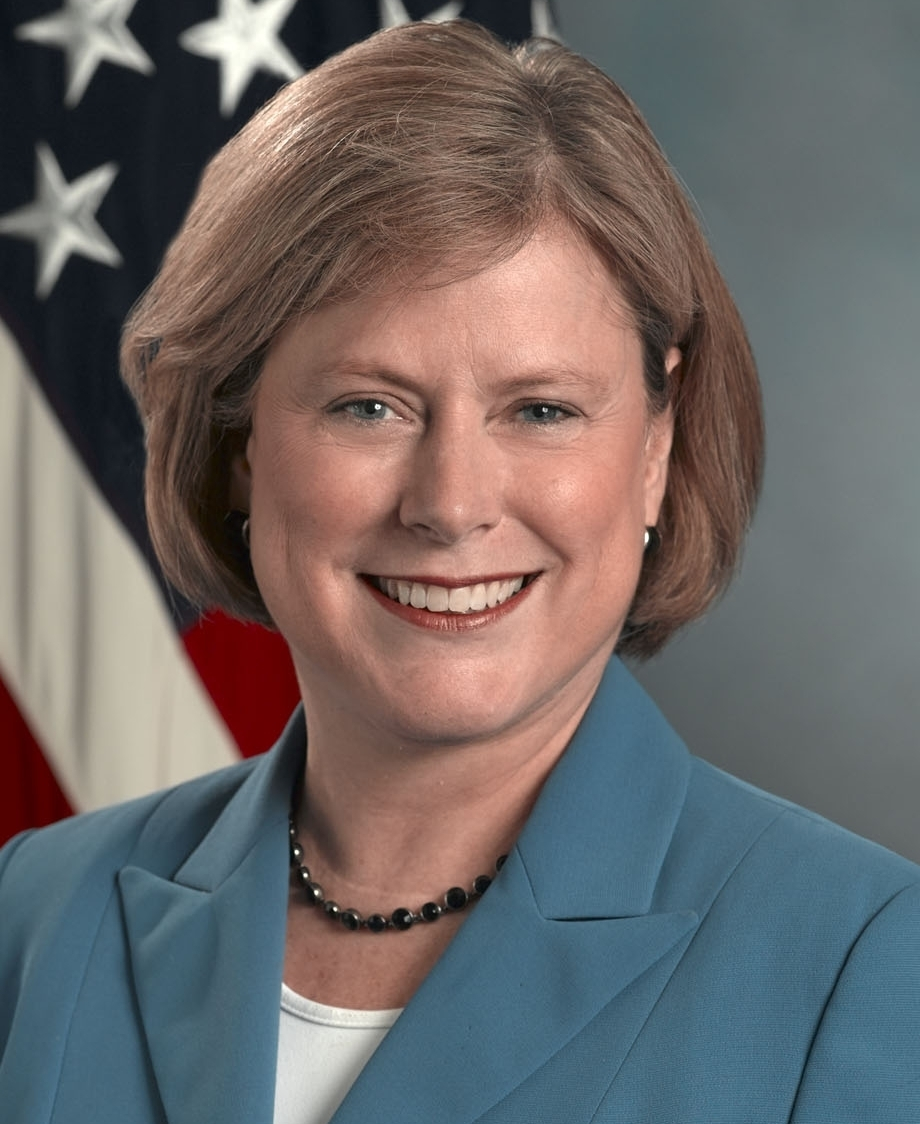
| Nominee | Lynn Jenkins | Nancy Boyda |
| Party | Republican | Democratic |
| Popular vote | 155,532 | 142,013 |
| Percentage | 50.6% | 46.2% |
- County results Jenkins: 50–60% 60–70% Boyda: 40–50% 50–60% Tie: 40–50%
U.S. Representative before election
Nancy Boyda
Democratic
Elected U.S. Representative
Lynn Jenkins
Republican

Republican nominee and former Kansas State Treasurer Lynn Jenkins won against Democratic incumbent Nancy Boyda, Libertarian Robert Garrard, and Reform Party candidate Leslie Martin. Boyda was one of five incumbent House Democrats to be defeated in the 2008 congressional elections, along with Don Cazayoux (D-LA), William J. Jefferson (D-LA), Nick Lampson (D-TX), and Tim Mahoney (D-FL).

=== Predictions ===
| Source | Ranking | As of |
|---|---|---|
| The Cook Political Report | Lean D | November 6, 2008 |
| Rothenberg | Tilt D | November 2, 2008 |
| Sabato's Crystal Ball | Lean D | November 6, 2008 |
| Real Clear Politics | Lean R (flip) | November 7, 2008 |
| CQ Politics | Tossup | November 6, 2008 |

Kansas's 2nd congressional district election, 2008
| Party | Candidate | Votes | % |
|---|---|---|---|
| Republican | Lynn Jenkins | 155,532 | 50.61 |
| Democratic | Nancy Boyda (incumbent) | 142,013 | 46.21 |
| Reform | Leslie S. Martin | 5,080 | 1.65 |
| Libertarian | Robert Garrard | 4,683 | 1.52 |
| Total votes | | 307,308 | 100.00 |
| Republican gain from Democratic | | | |

== District 3 ==
2008 Kansas's 3rd congressional district election

| Nominee | Dennis Moore | Nick Jordan |
| Party | Democratic | Republican |
| Popular vote | 202,541 | 142,307 |
| Percentage | 56.4% | 39.7% |
U.S. Representative before election
Dennis Moore
Democratic
Elected U.S. Representative
Dennis Moore
Democratic

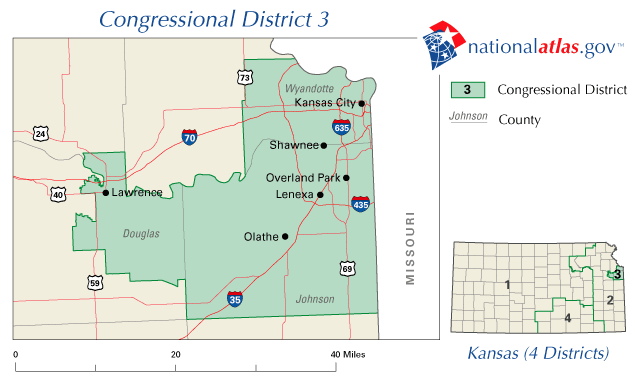

Incumbent Democrat Dennis Moore won against Republican nominee and Kansas State Senator Nick Jordan, Libertarian candidate Joe Bellis, and Reform candidate Roger Tucker.

=== Predictions ===
| Source | Ranking | As of |
|---|---|---|
| The Cook Political Report | Likely D | November 6, 2008 |
| Rothenberg | Safe D | November 2, 2008 |
| Sabato's Crystal Ball | Lean D | November 6, 2008 |
| Real Clear Politics | Safe D | November 7, 2008 |
| CQ Politics | Likely D | November 6, 2008 |

Kansas's 3rd congressional district election, 2008
| Party | Candidate | Votes | % |
|---|---|---|---|
| Democratic | Dennis Moore (incumbent) | 202,541 | 56.44 |
| Republican | Nick Jordan | 142,307 | 39.66 |
| Libertarian | Joe Bellis | 10,073 | 2.81 |
| Reform | Roger D. Trucker | 3,937 | 1.10 |
| Total votes | | 358,858 | 100.00 |
| Democratic hold | | | |

== District 4 ==
2008 Kansas's 4th congressional district election
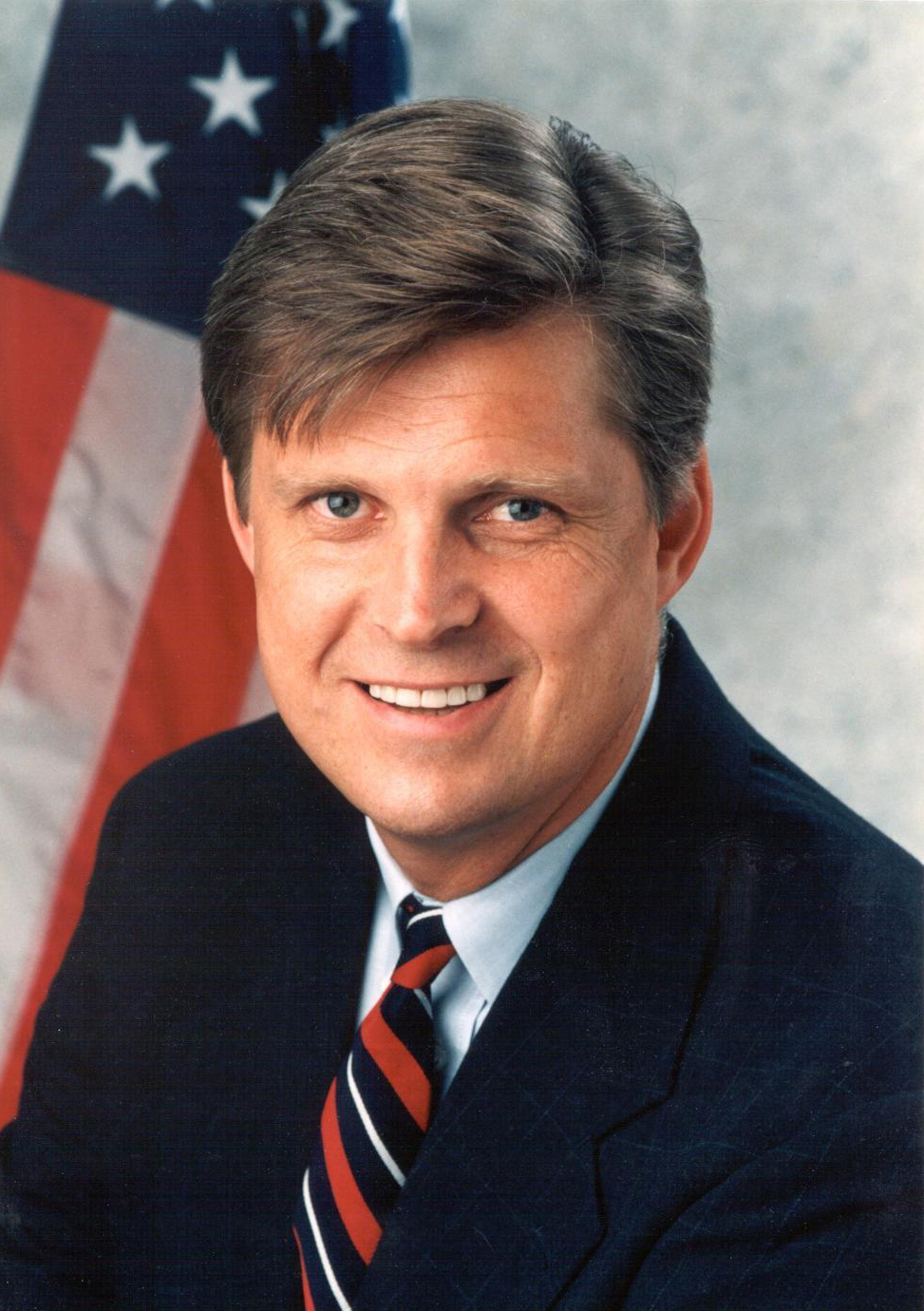

| Nominee | Todd Tiahrt | Donald Betts, Jr. |
| Party | Republican | Democratic |
| Popular vote | 177,617 | 90,706 |
| Percentage | 63.4% | 32.4% |
U.S. Representative before election
Todd Tiahrt
Republican
Elected U.S. Representative
Todd Tiahrt
Republican

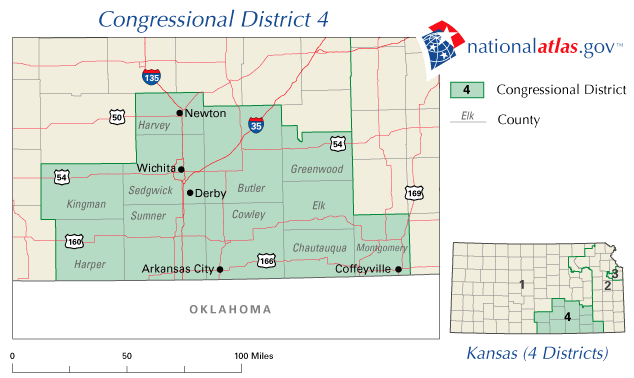

Incumbent Republican Todd Tiahrt won against Democratic nominee and Kansas State Senator Donald Betts, Jr., Libertarian candidate Steven Rosile and Reform Party candidate Susan G. Ducey in the general election.

=== Predictions ===
| Source | Ranking | As of |
|---|---|---|
| The Cook Political Report | Safe R | November 6, 2008 |
| Rothenberg | Safe R | November 2, 2008 |
| Sabato's Crystal Ball | Safe R | November 6, 2008 |
| Real Clear Politics | Safe R | November 7, 2008 |
| CQ Politics | Safe R | November 6, 2008 |

Kansas's 1st congressional district election, 2008
| Party | Candidate | Votes | % |
|---|---|---|---|
| Republican | Todd Tiahrt (incumbent) | 177,617 | 63.41 |
| Democratic | Donald Betts, Jr. | 90,706 | 32.38 |
| Reform | Susan G. Ducey | 6,441 | 2.30 |
| Libertarian | Steve A. Rosile | 5,345 | 1.91 |
| Total votes | | 280,109 | 100.00 |
| Republican hold | | | |
