= 2010 United States Senate election in Kansas =

- November 2, 2010
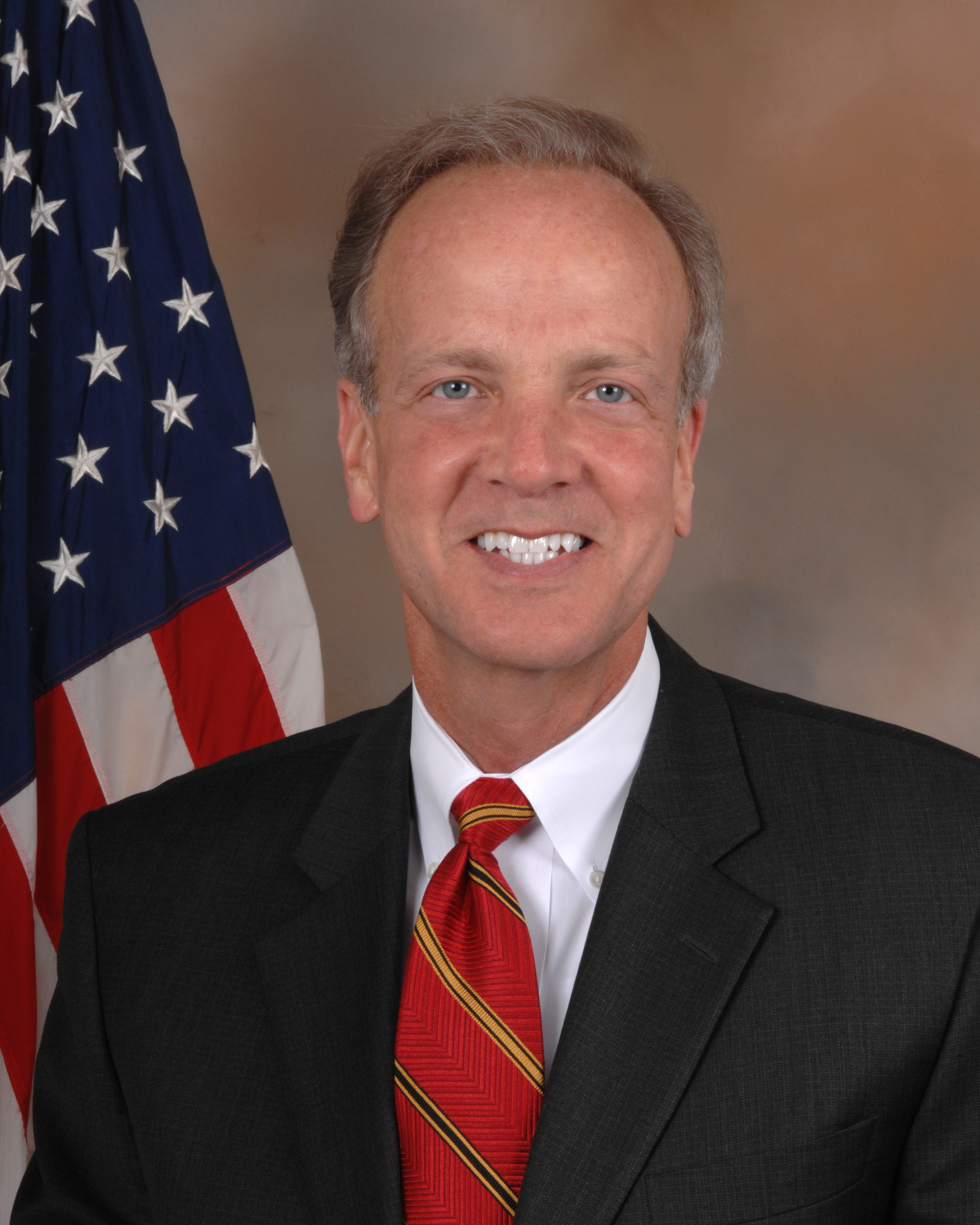

| Nominee | Jerry Moran | Lisa Johnston |
| Party | Republican | Democratic |
| Popular vote | 587,175 | 220,971 |
| Percentage | 70.09% | 26.38% |
- County results Moran: 50–60% 60–70% 70–80% 80–90% >90% Johnston: 40–50% 50–60%
U.S. senator before election
Sam Brownback
Republican
Elected U.S. Senator
Jerry Moran
Republican

The 2010 United States Senate election in Kansas took place on November 2, 2010, alongside other elections to the United States Senate in other states as well as elections to the United States House of Representatives and various state and local elections. Incumbent Senator Sam Brownback did not seek a third full term, but instead successfully ran for Governor of Kansas.

Fellow Republican and representative Jerry Moran won the open seat. This was the first open-seat United States Senate election in Kansas for this seat since 1968. (Note: Sheila Frahm ran for the 1996 special election to finish Bob Dole's term, but lost in the primary to Sam Brownback.)

== Background ==
Sam Brownback was first elected to the Senate in 1996, replacing Bob Dole, who resigned to run for President. Brownback stated that he would not run for re-election in 2010 because of self-imposed term limits. Kansas had been considered one of the most Republican states in the nation; no Democrat had been elected to either Senate seat since 1932 prior to 2026.

== Republican primary ==
=== Candidates ===
- Tom Little, accountant
- Bob Londerholm, former Attorney General of Kansas
- Jerry Moran, U.S. Representative
- Todd Tiahrt, U.S. Representative

=== Campaign ===
The retirement of Brownback, a popular U.S. Senator, led to a heavily competitive primary election. Tiahrt, who was on the Committee of Appropriations, had been accused of excessive earmarking while he was in Congress. From 2006 to 2008, Tiahrt had requested and supported a total of 63 solo earmarks, costing $53.9 million. In the same period, Moran had requested and supported a total of 29 earmarks, with a pricetag of $13.4 million.

=== Endorsements ===
==== Moran ====
Notable individuals and organizations endorsing Jerry Moran

U.S. Senators

- Richard Burr, North Carolina
- Tom Coburn, Oklahoma
- Jim DeMint, South Carolina
- Mike Johanns, Nebraska
- John McCain, Arizona, 2008 Republican nominee for President
- John Thune, South Dakota
- Jim Talent, formerly of Missouri

U.S. representatives

- Jeff Flake, Arizona

==== Tiahrt ====
State/local-level positions (State Senators, Governors, etc.)

State Senators

- Steve Abrams
- Les Donovan
- Dick Kelsey
- Julia Lynn
- Ty Masterson
- Carolyn McGinn
- Susan Wagle

State Representatives

- Kansas House Majority Leader Ray Merrick
- Kansas Speaker Pro Tempore Arlen Seigfreid
- Steven Brunk
- J. David Crum
- Peter DeGraaf
- Mario Goico
- John Grange
- Phil Hermanson
- Steve Huebert
- Aaron Jack
- Kasha Kelley
- Dan Kerschen
- Brenda Landwehr
- Joe McLeland
- Virgil Peck
- Marc Rhoades
- Gene Suellentrop
U.S. federal positions (Senators, Congressmen, etc.)

Executive branch officials

- John Ashcroft, former attorney general of the United States
- Bill Bennett, former United States Secretary of Education

U.S. senators

- James Inhofe, Oklahoma
- Rick Santorum, formerly of Pennsylvania

U.S. representatives

- Mike Rogers of Alabama
- Former Speaker of the House Dennis Hastert, Illinois
- Jim Ryun, formerly of Kansas
Notable individuals and organizations endorsing Todd Tiahrt

U.S. representatives

- Tom Tancredo, formerly of Colorado

Statewide officials

- Sarah Palin, former Governor of Alaska and 2008 vice presidential nominee

Individuals

- James Dobson, founder of Focus on the Family
- Erick Erickson, editor of the conservative weblog RedState
- Steve Forbes, former Republican presidential candidate and editor-in-chief of Forbes
- Gracia Burnham, Kansas resident and former missionary kidnapped in Philippines
- Darla Jaye, talk show host on KMBZ
- David Keene, Chairman of the American Conservative Union
- Mark Levin, prominent conservative author and talk show host
- Dick Morris, Fox News contributor
- Tony Perkins, President of the Family Research Council
- Phyllis Schlafly, founder of Eagle Forum
- Karl Rove, former Deputy Chief of Staff and Senior Advisor for President George W. Bush

Organizations

- Eagle Forum PAC
- Concerned Women for America PAC
- Family Research Council Action PAC
- Great American Forum PAC
- Kansans for Government Reform PAC
- Kansans for Life PAC
- Kansas State University College Republicans
- Pittsburg State University College Republicans
- Benedictine College Republicans
- Baker University College Republicans
- Kansas Federation of College Republicans
- Northwest Johnson County Republicans
- Wichita State University College Republicans

=== Polling ===
| Poll source | Dates administered | Todd Tiahrt | Jerry Moran |
|---|---|---|---|
| Research 2000 | February 2–4, 2009 | 24% | 19% |
| Survey USA | April 17–19, 2009 | 35% | 39% |
| Survey USA | June 12–14, 2009 | 38% | 40% |
| Survey USA | October 2–4, 2009 | 27% | 43% |
| Survey USA | December 4–6, 2009 | 34% | 37% |
| Survey USA | January 29–31, 2010 | 33% | 40% |
| Survey USA | March 26–28, 2010 | 32% | 42% |
| Survey USA | May 21–23, 2010 | 29% | 52% |
| Survey USA | June 24–27, 2010 | 33% | 53% |
| Survey USA | July 15–18, 2010 | 36% | 50% |
| Survey USA | July 29 – August 1, 2010 | 39% | 49% |

=== Results ===
Primary results by county. Moran: 40–50%; 50–60%; 60–70%; 70–80%; 80–90%; Tiahrt: 40–50%; 50–60%; 60–70%

Republican primary results
| Party | Candidate | Votes | % |
|---|---|---|---|
| Republican | Jerry Moran | 161,407 | 49.8% |
| Republican | Todd Tiahrt | 144,372 | 44.6% |
| Republican | Tom Little | 10,104 | 3.1% |
| Republican | Bob Londerholm | 8,168 | 2.5% |
| Total votes | | 324,051 | 100.00% |

== Democratic primary ==
=== Candidates ===
- Robert Conroy, retired railroad employee
- David Haley, state senator and nominee for Secretary of State in 2002 and 2006
- Lisa Johnston, administrator at Baker University
- Charles Schollenberger, retired communications executive
- Patrick Wiesner, attorney and CPA

=== Polling ===
| Poll source | Dates administered | Charles Schollenberger | Lisa Johnston | Robert Conroy | David Haley | Undecided |
|---|---|---|---|---|---|---|
| Survey USA | June 24–27, 2010 | 16% | 24% | 11% | 11% | 35% |
| Survey USA | July 15–18, 2010 | 14% | 23% | 7% | 12% | 36% |
| Survey USA | July 29 – August 1, 2010 | 21% | 29% | 7% | 12% | 25% |

=== Results ===
Democratic primary results
| Party | Candidate | Votes | % |
|---|---|---|---|
| Democratic | Lisa Johnston | 25,421 | 31.2% |
| Democratic | Charles Schollenberger | 19,228 | 23.6% |
| Democratic | David Haley | 15,584 | 19.2% |
| Democratic | Patrick Wiesner | 13,359 | 16.4% |
| Democratic | Robert Conroy | 7,779 | 9.6% |
| Total votes | | 81,371 | 100.00% |

== General election ==
=== Candidates ===
==== Major ====
- Jerry Moran (R), U.S. Representative (campaign site, PVS, FEC)
- Lisa Johnston (D), Baker University administrator (campaign site, PVS, FEC)

==== Minor ====
- Michael Dann (L) (campaign site, PVS)
- Joe Bellis (RE) (campaign site, PVS)

=== Campaign ===
Kansas is a very red state, where no Democrat has won a U.S. Senate election since 1932. After the primary, Moran chose not to release any more negative advertisements. Democrat Lisa Johnston ran a low-profile, quiet race. On election day, she won only two counties: Wyandotte County and Douglas County, while Moran won statewide by a landslide.

=== Debates ===
The two never met for a debate.

=== Predictions ===
| Source | Ranking | As of |
|---|---|---|
| Cook Political Report | Solid R | October 26, 2010 |
| Rothenberg | Safe R | October 22, 2010 |
| RealClearPolitics | Safe R | October 26, 2010 |
| Sabato's Crystal Ball | Safe R | October 21, 2010 |
| CQ Politics | Safe R | October 26, 2010 |

=== Polling ===
| Poll source | Date(s) administered | Jerry Moran | Lisa Johnston |
|---|---|---|---|
| Rasmussen Reports | May 11, 2010 | 61% | 25% |
| Rasmussen Reports | June 30, 2010 | 59% | 23% |
| Rasmussen Reports | August 4, 2010 | 61% | 28% |
| Survey USA | August 12–15, 2010 | 69% | 23% |
| Survey USA | September 14–16, 2010 | 66% | 24% |
| Survey USA | October 10–12, 2010 | 67% | 27% |
| Survey USA | October 22–26, 2010 | 66% | 26% |

=== Fundraising ===
| Candidate (party) | Receipts | Disbursements | Cash on hand | Debt |
|---|---|---|---|---|
| Lisa Johnston (D) | $10,627 | $4,530 | $6,096 | $1,131 |
| Jerry Moran (R) | $2,749,244 | $4,497,168 | $795,015 | $0 |
Source: Federal Election Commission

=== Results ===
United States Senate election in Kansas, 2010
| Party | Candidate | Votes | % | ±% |
|---|---|---|---|---|
| Republican | Jerry Moran | 587,175 | 70.09% | +0.93% |
| Democratic | Lisa Johnston | 220,971 | 26.38% | −1.11% |
| Libertarian | Michael Dann | 17,922 | 2.14% | +0.21% |
| Reform | Joe Bellis | 11,624 | 1.39% | −0.03% |
| Total votes | | 837,692 | 100.0% | |
| Republican hold | | | | |

==== Counties that flipped from Republican to Democratic ====
- Douglas (largest city: Lawrence)
