= Joseph Norvell =

American politician (born 1950)

Member of the Kansas Senate from the 37th district
- In office 1977–1988
- Succeeded by: Jerry Moran

Member of the Kansas House of Representatives from the 111th district
- In office 1973–1976

Personal details
- Born: April 14, 1950 (age 76)
- Party: Democratic

Joseph F. Norvell (born April 14, 1950) is an American former politician who served in the Kansas House of Representatives and Kansas State Senate.

In 1972, Norvell faced Alfred Harkness in the general election. He won, representing the 111th district. In 1976, he lost the special election to replace Chuck Wilson in the Kansas State Senate, who had died in a motor accident, to Albert Campbell. The same year, he was elected to the Kansas Senate, where he served for three terms before being succeeded by Jerry Moran.
