= United States Senate Committee on Veterans' Affairs =

Standing committee of the US Senate

Senate Veterans' Affairs Committee
Standing committee
- Active United States Senate; 119th Congress

History
- Formed: October 26, 1970

Leadership
- Chair: Jerry Moran (R); Since January 3, 2025
- Ranking Member: Richard Blumenthal (D); Since January 3, 2025

Structure
- Seats: 19 members
- Political parties: Majority (10): Republican (10); Minority (9): Democratic (7); Independent (2)

Jurisdiction
- Oversight authority: Department of Veterans Affairs
- House counterpart: House Committee on Veterans' Affairs

Website
- www.veterans.senate.gov

The United States Senate Committee on Veterans' Affairs deals with oversight of United States veterans' problems and issues.

== Description ==
The committee was created in 1970 to transfer responsibilities for veterans from the Finance and Labor committees to a single panel. From 1947 to 1970, matters relating to veterans compensation and veterans generally were referred to the Committee on Finance, while matters relating to the vocational rehabilitation, education, medical care, civil relief, and civilian readjustment of veterans were referred to the Committee on Labor and Public Welfare.

Congressional legislation affecting veterans changed over the years. For the members of the armed forces and their families in the nation's early wars – the Revolutionary War, the War of 1812, the Mexican War, the Civil War and the Spanish–American War – the response of the federal government had been essentially financial. This was clearly the legislative mission of the Senate Committee on Pensions which was created as one of the Senate's original standing committees in 1816 and continued until its termination in the Legislative Reorganization Act of 1946.

During World War I the nature of the congressional response to veterans' needs changed towards a more diversified set of programs. A war risk insurance program, which was referred to the Senate Finance Committee, changed the consideration of veterans benefits in the Senate. The Finance Committee was the Senate standing committee most responsible for veterans programs from 1917 to 1946. After World War II, the Finance Committee handled the Servicemen's Readjustment Act of 1944, the GI Bill of Rights, which extended to servicemen and their families, a number of benefits including unemployment assistance, education, vocational training, housing and business loan guarantees, as well as the traditional medical and pension benefits of previous times. Many experts believe this law was one of the most important elements in the expansion of the middle class following World War II.

The Veterans' Affairs Committee had nine members in its initial congress, the 92nd Congress (1971–73). It now has a total of 19 members.

== Members, 119th Congress ==
Majority	Minority
Jerry Moran, Kansas, Chair; John Boozman, Arkansas; Bill Cassidy, Louisiana; Thom Tillis, North Carolina; Dan Sullivan, Alaska; Marsha Blackburn, Tennessee; Kevin Cramer, North Dakota; Tommy Tuberville, Alabama; Jim Banks, Indiana; Tim Sheehy, Montana	Richard Blumenthal, Connecticut, Ranking Member; Patty Murray, Washington; Bernie Sanders, Vermont (Note: Senator is formally an independent but caucuses with the Democrats); Mazie Hirono, Hawaii; Maggie Hassan, New Hampshire; Angus King, Maine; Tammy Duckworth, Illinois; Ruben Gallego, Arizona; Elissa Slotkin, Michigan

According to committee members' official online biographies, five (Banks, Blumenthal, Duckworth, Gallego, Sheehy) of the nineteen members are veterans.

== Chairs of the Senate Committee on Veterans' Affairs, 1971–present ==
Name	Party	State	Start	End
Vance Hartke	Democratic	Indiana	1971	1977
Alan Cranston	Democratic	California	1977	1981
Alan Simpson	Republican	Wyoming	1981	1985
Frank Murkowski	Republican	Alaska	1985	1987
Alan Cranston	Democratic	California	1987	1993
Jay Rockefeller	Democratic	West Virginia	1993	1995
Alan Simpson	Republican	Wyoming	1995	1997
Arlen Specter	Republican	Pennsylvania	1997	2001
Jay Rockefeller	Democratic	West Virginia	2001	2003
Arlen Specter	Republican	Pennsylvania	2003	2005
Larry Craig	Republican	Idaho	2005	2007
Daniel Akaka	Democratic	Hawaii	2007	2011
Patty Murray	Democratic	Washington	2011	2013
Bernie Sanders	Independent	Vermont	2013	2015
Johnny Isakson	Republican	Georgia	2015	2019
Jerry Moran	Republican	Kansas	2020	2021
Jon Tester	Democratic	Montana	2021	2025
Jerry Moran	Republican	Kansas	2025	present

== Ranking members ==
Name	Party	State	Start	End
Strom Thurmond	Republican	South Carolina	1971	1973
Clifford Hansen	Republican	Wyoming	1973	1979
Robert Stafford	Republican	Vermont	1979	1981
Alan Cranston	Democratic	California	1981	1987
Frank Murkowski	Republican	Alaska	1987	1991
Alan Simpson	Republican	Pennsylvania	1991	1995
Jay Rockefeller	Democratic	West Virginia	1995	2001
Arlen Specter	Republican	Pennsylvania	2001	2003
Bob Graham	Democratic	Florida	2003	2005
Daniel Akaka	Democratic	Hawaii	2005	2007
Larry Craig	Republican	Idaho	2007	
Richard Burr	Republican	North Carolina	2007	2015
Dick Blumenthal	Democratic	Connecticut	2015	2017
Jon Tester	Democratic	Montana	2017	2021
Jerry Moran	Republican	Kansas	2021	2025
Dick Blumenthal	Democratic	Connecticut	2025	present

== Historical committee rosters ==
=== 118th Congress ===
Majority	Minority
Jon Tester, Montana, Chair; Patty Murray, Washington; Bernie Sanders, Vermont; Sherrod Brown, Ohio; Richard Blumenthal, Connecticut; Mazie Hirono, Hawaii; Joe Manchin, West Virginia; Kyrsten Sinema, Arizona; Maggie Hassan, New Hampshire; Angus King, Maine	Jerry Moran, Kansas, Ranking Member; John Boozman, Arkansas; Bill Cassidy, Louisiana; Mike Rounds, South Dakota; Thom Tillis, North Carolina; Dan Sullivan, Alaska; Marsha Blackburn, Tennessee; Kevin Cramer, North Dakota; Tommy Tuberville, Alabama

According to committee members' official online biographies, two of the eighteen members are veterans: Richard Blumenthal and Dan Sullivan.

=== 117th Congress ===
Majority	Minority
Jon Tester, Montana, Chair; Patty Murray, Washington; Bernie Sanders, Vermont; Sherrod Brown, Ohio; Richard Blumenthal, Connecticut; Mazie Hirono, Hawaii; Joe Manchin, West Virginia; Kyrsten Sinema, Arizona; Maggie Hassan, New Hampshire	Jerry Moran, Kansas, Ranking Member; John Boozman, Arkansas; Bill Cassidy, Louisiana; Mike Rounds, South Dakota; Thom Tillis, North Carolina; Dan Sullivan, Alaska; Marsha Blackburn, Tennessee; Kevin Cramer, North Dakota; Tommy Tuberville, Alabama

=== 116th Congress ===
Majority	Minority
Johnny Isakson, Georgia, Chair (until December 31, 2019); Jerry Moran, Kansas, Chair (from January 6, 2020); John Boozman, Arkansas; Bill Cassidy, Louisiana; Mike Rounds, South Dakota; Thom Tillis, North Carolina; Dan Sullivan, Alaska; Marsha Blackburn, Tennessee; Kevin Cramer, North Dakota; Kelly Loeffler, Georgia (from January 6, 2020)	Jon Tester, Montana, Ranking Member; Patty Murray, Washington; Bernie Sanders, Vermont; Sherrod Brown, Ohio; Richard Blumenthal, Connecticut; Mazie Hirono, Hawaii; Joe Manchin, West Virginia; Kyrsten Sinema, Arizona

=== 115th Congress ===
Majority	Minority
Johnny Isakson, Georgia, Chair; Jerry Moran, Kansas; John Boozman, Arkansas; Bill Cassidy, Louisiana; Mike Rounds, South Dakota; Thom Tillis, North Carolina; Dan Sullivan, Alaska	Jon Tester, Montana, Ranking Member; Patty Murray, Washington; Bernie Sanders, Vermont; Sherrod Brown, Ohio; Richard Blumenthal, Connecticut; Mazie Hirono, Hawaii; Joe Manchin, West Virginia

=== 114th Congress ===
Majority	Minority
Johnny Isakson, Georgia, Chair; Jerry Moran, Kansas; John Boozman, Arkansas; Dean Heller, Nevada; Bill Cassidy, Louisiana; Mike Rounds, South Dakota; Thom Tillis, North Carolina; Dan Sullivan, Alaska	Richard Blumenthal, Connecticut, Ranking Member; Patty Murray, Washington; Bernie Sanders, Vermont; Sherrod Brown, Ohio; Jon Tester, Montana; Mazie Hirono, Hawaii; Joe Manchin, West Virginia

=== 113th Congress ===
Majority	Minority
Bernie Sanders, Vermont, Chair; Jay Rockefeller, West Virginia; Patty Murray, Washington; Sherrod Brown, Ohio; Jon Tester, Montana; Mark Begich, Alaska; Richard Blumenthal, Connecticut; Mazie Hirono, Hawaii	Richard Burr, North Carolina, Ranking Member; Johnny Isakson, Georgia; Mike Johanns, Nebraska; Jerry Moran, Kansas; John Boozman, Arkansas; Dean Heller, Nevada

Source: 2013 Congressional Record, Vol. 159, Page S296 to 297

=== 112th Congress ===
Majority	Minority
Patty Murray, Washington, Chair; Bernie Sanders, Vermont; Jay Rockefeller, West Virginia; Sherrod Brown, Ohio; Jon Tester, Montana; Mark Begich, Alaska; Richard Blumenthal, Connecticut; Mazie Hirono, Hawaii	Richard Burr, North Carolina, Ranking Member; Johnny Isakson, Georgia; Mike Johanns, Nebraska; Jerry Moran, Kansas; John Boozman, Arkansas; Dean Heller, Nevada

Source: 2011 Congressional Record, Vol. 157, Page S557

=== 111th Congress ===
Majority	Minority
Daniel Akaka, Hawaii, Chair; Jay Rockefeller, West Virginia; Patty Murray, Washington; Bernie Sanders, Vermont; Sherrod Brown, Ohio; Jim Webb, Virginia; Jon Tester, Montana; Mark Begich, Alaska; Roland Burris, Illinois, until November 29, 2010; Arlen Specter, Pennsylvania	Richard Burr, North Carolina, Ranking Member; Johnny Isakson, Georgia; Roger Wicker, Mississippi; Mike Johanns, Nebraska; Scott Brown, Massachusetts; Lindsey Graham, South Carolina

Source: 2009 Congressional Record, Vol. 155, Page S5168 and 2010 Congressional Record, Vol. 156, Page S970

=== 110th Congress ===
Majority	Minority
Daniel Akaka, Hawaii, Chair; Jay Rockefeller, West Virginia; Patty Murray, Washington; Bernie Sanders, Vermont; Sherrod Brown, Ohio; Jim Webb, Virginia; Jon Tester, Montana	Richard Burr, Ranking Member, North Carolina; Arlen Specter, Pennsylvania; Johnny Isakson, Georgia; Lindsey Graham, South Carolina; Roger Wicker, Mississippi; Mike Johanns, Nebraska

== See also ==
- List of United States Senate committees
- United States House Committee on Veterans' Affairs
- United States Department of Veterans Affairs
