= United States Senate Appropriations Subcommittee on Commerce, Justice, Science, and Related Agencies =

U.S. Senate Appropriations Subcommittee on Commerce, Justice, Science, and Related Agencies, often referred to colloquially as the CJS Subcommittee is one of twelve subcommittees of the U.S. Senate Committee on Appropriations. It was formerly known as the Subcommittee on Commerce, Justice, State, and the Judiciary during the 108th Congress (2003–2005), but responsibility for the State Department and the federal Judiciary are now handled by separate subcommittees. The United States Senate Committee on Appropriations has joint jurisdiction with the United States House Committee on Appropriations over all appropriations bills in the United States Congress. Each committee has 12 matching subcommittees, each of which is tasked with working on one of the twelve annual regular appropriations bills. This subcommittee has jurisdiction over the budget for the United States Department of Commerce, the United States Department of Justice, and Science policy of the United States.

== Appropriations process ==
Traditionally, after a federal budget for the upcoming fiscal year has been passed, the appropriations subcommittees receive information about what the budget sets as their spending ceilings. This is called "302(b) allocations" after section 302(b) of the Congressional Budget Act of 1974. That amount is separated into smaller amounts for each of the twelve Subcommittees. The federal budget does not become law and is not signed by the President. Instead, it is guide for the House and the Senate in making appropriations and tax decisions. However, no budget is required and each chamber has procedures in place for what to do without one. The House and Senate now consider appropriations bills simultaneously, although originally the House went first. The House Committee on Appropriations usually reports the appropriations bills in May and June and the Senate in June. Any differences between appropriations bills passed by the House and the Senate are resolved in the fall.

== Appropriations bills ==
An appropriations bill is a bill that appropriates (gives to, sets aside for) money to specific federal government departments, agencies, and programs. The money provides funding for operations, personnel, equipment, and activities. Regular appropriations bills are passed annually, with the funding they provide covering one fiscal year. The fiscal year is the accounting period of the federal government, which runs from October 1 to September 30 of the following year.

There are three types of appropriations bills: regular appropriations bills, continuing resolutions, and supplemental appropriations bills. Regular appropriations bills are the twelve standard bills that cover the funding for the federal government for one fiscal year and that are supposed to be enacted into law by October 1. If Congress has not enacted the regular appropriations bills by the time, it can pass a continuing resolution, which continues the pre-existing appropriations at the same levels as the previous fiscal year (or with minor modifications) for a set amount of time. The third type of appropriations bills are supplemental appropriations bills, which add additional funding above and beyond what was originally appropriated at the beginning of the fiscal year. Supplemental appropriations bills can be used for things like disaster relief.

Appropriations bills are one part of a larger United States budget and spending process. They are preceded in that process by the president's budget proposal, congressional budget resolutions, and the 302(b) allocation. Article One of the United States Constitution, section 9, clause 7, states that "No money shall be drawn from the Treasury, but in Consequence of Appropriations made by Law..." This is what gives Congress the power to make these appropriations. The President, however, still has the power to veto appropriations bills.

== Jurisdiction ==
This subcommittee is responsible for discretionary spending at the Commerce Department and the Justice Department, as well various independent federal agencies, such as the International Trade Commission, the National Aeronautics and Space Administration, the National Science Foundation, and the U.S. Commission on Civil Rights.

== Members, 119th Congress ==
| Majority | Minority |
|---|---|
| Jerry Moran, Kansas, Chair; Lisa Murkowski, Alaska; Susan Collins, Maine; Lindsey Graham, South Carolina (until July 11, 2026); Shelley Moore Capito, West Virginia; John Kennedy, Louisiana; Bill Hagerty, Tennessee; Katie Britt, Alabama; Deb Fischer, Nebraska; Darline Graham, South Carolina (from July 22, 2026) | Chris Van Hollen, Maryland, Ranking Member; Jack Reed, Rhode Island; Jeanne Shaheen, New Hampshire; Chris Coons, Delaware; Brian Schatz, Hawaii; Jeff Merkley, Oregon; Gary Peters, Michigan; Kirsten Gillibrand, New York |
Ex officio
| | Patty Murray, Washington |

== Historical subcommittee rosters ==
=== 116th Congress ===
| Majority | Minority |
|---|---|
| Jerry Moran, Kansas, Chairman; Lamar Alexander, Tennessee; Lisa Murkowski, Alaska; Susan Collins, Maine; Lindsey Graham, South Carolina; John Boozman, Arkansas; Shelley Moore Capito, West Virginia; John Kennedy, Louisiana; Marco Rubio, Florida | Jeanne Shaheen, New Hampshire, Ranking Member; Patrick Leahy, Vermont; Dianne Feinstein, California; Jack Reed, Rhode Island; Chris Coons, Delaware; Brian Schatz, Hawaii; Joe Manchin, West Virginia; Chris Van Hollen, Maryland |
Ex officio
| Richard Shelby, Alabama | |

=== 117th Congress ===
| Majority | Minority |
|---|---|
| Jeanne Shaheen, New Hampshire, Chair; Patrick Leahy, Vermont; Dianne Feinstein, California; Jack Reed, Rhode Island; Chris Coons, Delaware; Brian Schatz, Hawaii; Joe Manchin, West Virginia; Chris Van Hollen, Maryland; Jeff Merkley, Oregon | Jerry Moran, Kansas, Ranking Member; Lisa Murkowski, Alaska; Susan Collins, Maine; Lindsey Graham, South Carolina; John Boozman, Arkansas; Shelley Moore Capito, West Virginia; John Kennedy, Louisiana; Bill Hagerty, Tennessee; Mike Braun, Indiana |
Ex officio
| | Richard Shelby, Alabama |

=== 118th Congress ===
| Majority | Minority |
|---|---|
| Jeanne Shaheen, New Hampshire, Chair; Gary Peters, Michigan; Dianne Feinstein, California (until September 29, 2023); Jack Reed, Rhode Island; Chris Coons, Delaware; Brian Schatz, Hawaii; Joe Manchin, West Virginia; Chris Van Hollen, Maryland; Jeff Merkley, Oregon | Jerry Moran, Kansas, Ranking Member; Lisa Murkowski, Alaska; Susan Collins, Maine; Katie Britt, Alabama; Shelley Moore Capito, West Virginia; John Kennedy, Louisiana; Bill Hagerty, Tennessee; Deb Fischer, Nebraska |
Ex officio
| Patty Murray, Washington | |

== See also ==
- United States House Appropriations Subcommittee on Commerce, Justice, Science, and Related Agencies
