= Todd Tiahrt =

American politician (born 1951)

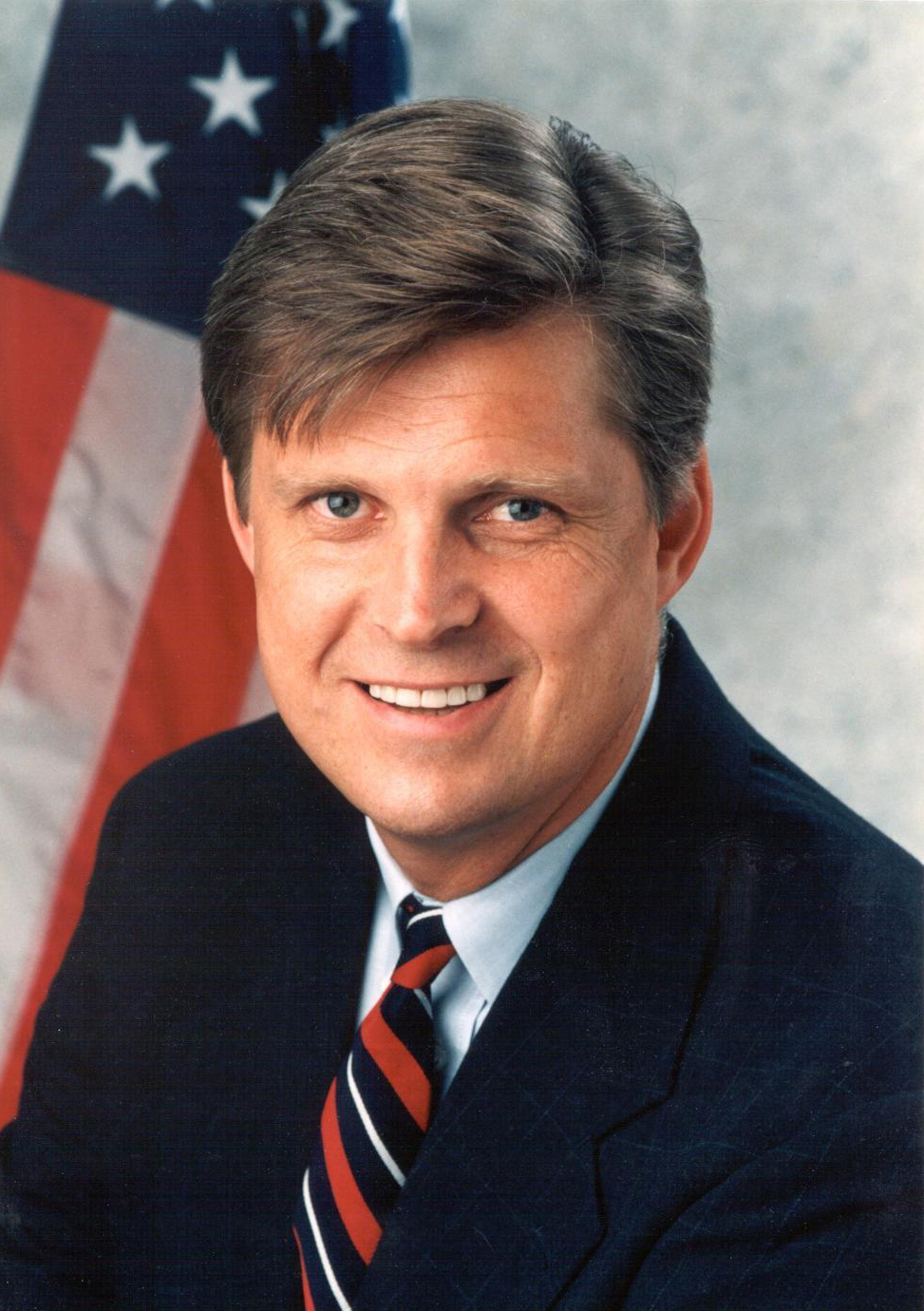

Member of the U.S. House of Representatives from Kansas's 4th district
- In office January 3, 1995 – January 3, 2011
- Preceded by: Dan Glickman
- Succeeded by: Mike Pompeo

Member of the Kansas Senate from the 26th district
- In office January 11, 1993 – January 3, 1995
- Preceded by: Kenneth D. Francisco
- Succeeded by: Nancey D. Harrington

Personal details
- Born: William Todd Tiahrt; June 15, 1951 (age 75) Vermillion, South Dakota, U.S.
- Party: Republican
- Spouse: Vicki Tiahrt
- Children: 3
- Education: South Dakota School of Mines and Technology; Evangel University (BA); Southwest Missouri State University (MBA)

William Todd Tiahrt (/ˈtiːhɑːrt/ TEE-hart; born June 15, 1951) is an American politician who served as the U.S. representative for Kansas's 4th congressional district from 1995 to 2011. A member of the Republican Party, he was elected as part of the historic Republican Revolution of 1994, defeating 18-year incumbent U.S. Representative Dan Glickman. He ran in 2010 for the United States Senate seat being vacated by Sam Brownback. He narrowly lost the Republican primary to fellow U.S. Representative Jerry Moran.

Tiahrt twice sought to regain his old congressional seat in the House, which is centered on the city of Wichita and south central Kansas. In 2014, he ran against incumbent Mike Pompeo in the Republican primary but was defeated. Then, in 2017, after Pompeo vacated the seat to become director of the CIA, Tiahrt sought the Republican nomination in the special election to fill it, but came in third, losing to Kansas State Treasurer Ron Estes.

== Early life, education and career ==
Tiahrt was born in Vermillion, South Dakota, the son of Marcine (née Steele) and Wilbur E. Tiahrt. He attended the South Dakota School of Mines and Technology where he played football as a running back. He went on to earn a bachelor's degree from Evangel College in 1975, and received an MBA from Southwest Missouri State University in 1989. He was a teacher at Kansas Newman College and Evangel College and worked for Boeing as a proposal manager.

== U.S. House of Representatives ==
=== Elections ===
Tiahrt was elected to the Kansas State Senate in 1992. After only one term, in 1994, he sought and won the Republican nomination for the 4th Congressional District, and was elected to the U.S. House in an upset over 18-year Democratic incumbent Dan Glickman. Over 1,800 people volunteered for Tiahrt's campaign, which spent only $200,000, less than a quarter of Glickman's expenditures.

One factor in the win was the 1990s reapportionment, in which Hutchinson and surrounding Reno County were shifted to the "Big 1st" District. Hutchinson was replaced in the 4th District with more reliably Republican Montgomery County. After a tough reelection bid in 1996, Tiahrt was reelected to the U.S. House six more times with little difficulty, before running unsuccessfully for the U.S. Senate in 2010.

=== Committee assignments ===
- Committee on Appropriations
  - Subcommittee on Defense
  - Subcommittee on Labor, Health and Human Services, Education, and Related Agencies (Ranking Member)
  - Subcommittee on Interior, Environment, and Related Agencies (Ranking Member)
  - Subcommittee on Transportation, Treasury, and General Government
  - Subcommittee on District of Columbia
  - Subcommittee on Military Construction
  - Subcommittee on the Legislative Branch
- House Permanent Select Committee on Intelligence

=== Leadership roles and caucus memberships ===
- Founder and chairman of the House Economic Competitiveness Caucus
- Deputy Majority Whip

=== Impeachment of Bill Clinton ===
In November 1997, Tiahrt was one of eighteen Republicans in the House to co-sponsor a resolution by Bob Barr that sought to launch an impeachment inquiry against President Bill Clinton. The resolution did not specify any charges or allegations. This was an early effort to impeach Clinton, predating the eruption of the Clinton–Lewinsky scandal. The eruption of that scandal would ultimately lead to a more serious effort to impeach Clinton in 1998. On October 8, 1998, Tiahrt voted in favor of legislation that was passed to open an impeachment inquiry. On December 19, 1998, Tiahrt voted in favor of all four proposed articles of impeachment against Clinton (only two of which received the needed majority of votes to be adopted).

=== Tiahrt Amendment ===
Tiahrt is the author of the Tiahrt Amendment which prohibits the National Tracing Center of the Bureau of Alcohol, Tobacco, Firearms and Explosives (ATF) from releasing information from its firearms trace database to anyone other than a law enforcement agency or prosecutor in connection with a criminal investigation.

This precludes gun trace data from being used in academic research of gun use in crime. Additionally, the law blocks any data legally released from being admissible in civil lawsuits against gun sellers or manufacturers. Some groups, including the Mayors Against Illegal Guns Coalition, believe that having further access to the ATF database would help municipal police departments track down sellers of illegal guns and curb crime. These groups are trying to undo the Tiahrt Amendment.

Numerous police organizations oppose the Tiahrt Amendment, such as the Major Cities Chiefs Association (MCCA) and the International Association of Chiefs of Police (IACP). Conversely, the Tiahrt Amendment is supported by the National Rifle Association of America, and the Fraternal Order of Police (although it allows municipal police departments only limited access to ATF trace data in any criminal investigation). The NRA has claimed that undoing the Tiahrt Amendment would lead to a rash of lawsuits against gun dealers.

In their 2010 letter of appreciation on behalf of the NRA Political Victory Fund and the 50,000 NRA members in Kansas, Tiahrt was honored with a 4th consecutive congressional race A+ rating for his contributions to the pro-gun efforts.

Tiahrt had earned the highest rating, by "voting for every pro-gun bill." This included "critical pro-gun reforms" like the 2005 Protection of Lawful Commerce in Arms Act (PLCAA); "legislation to expand Right-to-Carry to national parks and wildlife refuges", the Tiahrt Amendment to reform the ATF, and "legislation to restore" Second Amendment rights to Washington, D.C. The A+ ranking took into consideration the letter he submitted to court briefs that he signed as a "critical friend of the court briefs" in the 2008 landmark case District of Columbia v. Heller, in which the Supreme Court of the United States ruled that the Second Amendment protects an individual's right to possess a firearm unconnected with service in a militia for traditionally lawful purposes, such as self-defense within the home, and that Washington, D.C.'s handgun ban and requirement that lawfully-owned rifles and shotguns be kept "unloaded and disassembled or bound by a trigger lock" violated this guarantee, and the 2010 SC case McDonald v. Chicago, which found that the right of an individual to "keep and bear arms" is protected by the Due Process Clause of the Fourteenth Amendment against the states, clearing up any uncertainty left in the wake of the Heller case.

=== Tiahrt-Bilbray Bill Fairness for American Students Act ===
A bill was introduced by Tiahrt and Congressman Brian Bilbray (R-CA) called the Fairness for American Students Act that would close a loophole in current law that several states have used to provide lower-cost college tuition to illegal immigrants compared to tuition rates U.S. citizens from neighboring states have to pay.

=== Former Tiahrt congressional staff ===
Matt Schlapp is chairman of the American Conservative Union and a Fox News political commentator. Schlapp began his political career as a campaign volunteer for Tiahrt in 1994 and following Tiahrt's election in November 1994, Schlapp moved to Washington, D.C. to serve as Tiahrt's communications director and eventually chief of staff for five years. He later served as White House Political Director for President George W. Bush.

Matthew Stroia serves as chief of staff to U.S. Representative Mike Kelly (R-PA). He served as a legislative counsel for Tiahrt from 2008 to 2011.

Joel Katz currently serves as district director for U.S. Representative Andrew Clyde (R-GA). He served as legislative correspondent for Tiahrt from 2009 to 2011, and then went on to serve as legislative assistant for U.S. House of Representatives Majority Leader Eric Cantor, and chief of staff to U.S. Representative Doug Collins (R-GA).

Jeff Kahrs began as an intern for Tiahrt in the Kansas State Senate from 1993 to 1994 and later served as Tiahrt's legislative director and chief of staff from 1995 to 2010. Kahrs currently serves as senior advisor to U.S. Representative Jake LaTurner (R-KS).

Josh Bell served as a legislative correspondent and aide for Tiahrt from 2002 to 2011. He currently serve as chief of staff to U.S. Representative Ron Estes (R-KS).

Robert Noland was the only employee of Tiahrt's congressional campaign in 1994 and worked for Tiahrt throughout his tenure in the U.S. House, mostly as his district director in Wichita. Noland later served as executive director of the Kansas Family Policy Council.

== Political positions ==
=== Abortion and family planning ===
Tiahrt opposed government-funded abortions. While serving in Congress, he spoke at the annual March for Life.

The Tiahrt Amendment of 1998, which was most recently included in the FY2020 State-Foreign Operations Appropriations Act, ensures that no government funding is used in connection with forcible sterilizations in foreign countries. The amendment ensures that in foreign countries where the U.S. government funds voluntary family planning projects, women are not denied the right to participate in any general welfare program or denied the right of access to health care. Further, the amendment requires that any experimental contraceptive drugs and devices and medical procedures are provided only in the context of a scientific study in which participants are advised of potential risks and benefits.

Concern that the U.S. Agency for International Development (USAID) was possibly funding a forced sterilization campaign in Peru led Tiahrt to enact the Amendment.

=== Government funding for needles ===
Tiahrt was cited as responsible for preventing the City of Washington D.C., from spending federal or District funding on "needle exchange programs" for drug users from 1998 through 2007.

=== Comments on the TSA ===
On November 23, 2010, Tiahrt spoke in Wichita against recent TSA security measures and how they affect citizens' privacy. In 2009, along with Kansas' then-U.S. Senators, he co-authored a letter to the Homeland Security Secretary expressing concerns over new rules for privately owned aircraft over 12,500 pounds, which critics feared would further burden the already hurting private aviation industry and in turn the local communities where the small aircraft are manufactured in Kansas.

=== Stimulus spending ===
Tiahrt voted against the American Recovery and Reinvestment Act of 2009 and spoke against the stimulus in the House, planning to introduce an act to repeal the stimulus.

== Personal life ==
Tiahrt and his wife Vicki met while attending Evangel University. They have three children, Jessica, John and Luke, and five grandchildren. Jessica Tiahrt Healy graduated from George Mason University School of Law and is an attorney at the National Rural Electric Cooperative Association. John Tiahrt graduated from Wichita State University. On July 24, 2004, the Tiahrts' youngest child, sixteen year-old Luke, died of an apparent suicide at the family home in Virginia. The family established the Luke Tiahrt Memorial Fund to provide grants to organizations that benefits teenagers.

== Electoral history ==
- 2017 Republican Convention for Kansas 4th District
  - Ron Estes, 66 votes, 2nd Ballot
  - Alan Cobb, 43 votes
  - Todd Tiahrt, 17 votes
- 2014 Republican primary race for Kansas 4th District
  - Mike Pompeo (inc.), 42,877 votes, 63%
  - Todd Tiahrt, 25,501 votes, 37%
- 2010 Republican primary race for U.S. Senator – Kansas
  - Jerry Moran, 160,620 votes, 50%
  - Todd Tiahrt, 144,221 votes, 45%
- 2008 race for Kansas 4th District
  - Todd Tiahrt (R) (inc.), 64%
  - Donald Betts (D), 32%
- 2006 race for Kansas 4th District
  - Todd Tiahrt (R) (inc.), 64%
  - Garth McGinn (D), 34%
- 2004 race for Kansas 4th District
  - Todd Tiahrt (R) (inc.), 66%
  - Michael Kinard (D), 31%
- 2002 race for Kansas 4th District
  - Todd Tiahrt (R) (inc.), 61%
  - Carlos Nolla (D), 37%
- 2000 race for Kansas 4th District
  - Todd Tiahrt (R) (inc.), 54%
  - Carlos Nolla (D), 42%
  - Steven Rosile (L), 4%
- 1998 race for Kansas 4th District
  - Todd Tiahrt (R) (inc.), 58%
  - Jim Lawing (D), 39%
  - Craig Newland (T), 3%
- 1996 race for Kansas 4th District
  - Todd Tiahrt (R) (inc.), 50%
  - Randy Rathbun (D), 47%
- 1994 race for Kansas 4th District
  - Todd Tiahrt (R), 53%
  - Dan Glickman (D) (inc.), 47%

U.S. House of Representatives
Preceded by Dan Glickman	Member of the U.S. House of Representatives from Kansas's 4th congressional district 1995–2011	Succeeded by Mike Pompeo
U.S. order of precedence (ceremonial)
Preceded by Jackie Speier as Former U.S. Representative	Order of precedence of the United States as Former U.S. Representative	Succeeded by Lee Terry as Former U.S. Representative
