= 1998 United States House of Representatives elections in Kansas =

- November 3, 1998

All 4 Kansas seats to the United States House of Representatives
	Majority party	Minority party
Party	Republican	Democratic
Last election	4	0
Seats won	3	1
Seat change	▼1	▲1
Popular vote	450,025	272,252
Percentage	61.86%	37.43%
Swing	▲5.5%	▼3.09%

Republican
50–60%
60–70%
70–80%
80–90%
>90%
Democratic
50–60%
70–80%

The 1998 United States House of Representatives elections in Kansas were held on November 3, 1998, to elect the four U.S. representatives from the state of Kansas, one from each of the state's four congressional districts. Primaries were held on August 4, 1998.

== Overview ==
District	Republican		Democratic		U.S. Taxpayers'		Total		Results
District	Votes	%	Votes	%	Votes	%	Votes	%	Results
District 1	152,775	80.67%	36,618	19.33%	0	0.00%	189,393	100.0%	Republican hold
District 2	108,527	60.95%	69,521	39.05%	0	0.00%	178,048	100.0%	Republican hold
District 3	93,938	47.61%	103,376	52.39%	0	0.00%	197,314	100.0%	Democratic gain
District 4	94,785	58.26%	62,737	38.56%	5,171	3.18%	162,693	100.0%	Republican hold
Total	450,025	61.86%	272,252	37.43%	5,171	0.71%	727,448	100.0%	

Popular vote
Republican	61.86%
Democratic	37.43%
U.S. Taxpayers'	0.71%

House seats
Republican	75.00%
Democratic	25.00%

== District 1 ==
Kansas's 1st congressional district election, 1998
Party	Candidate	Votes	%
Republican	Jerry Moran (incumbent)	152,775	80.67
Democratic	Jim Phillips	36,618	19.33
Total votes		189,393	100.00
Republican hold			

== District 2 ==
Kansas's 2nd congressional district election, 1998
Party	Candidate	Votes	%
Republican	Jim Ryun (incumbent)	108,527	60.95
Democratic	Jim Clark	69,521	39.05
Total votes		178,048	100.00
Republican hold			

== District 3 ==
Kansas's 3rd congressional district election, 1998
Party	Candidate	Votes	%
Democratic	Dennis Moore	103,376	52.39
Republican	Vince Snowbarger (incumbent)	93,938	47.61
Total votes		197,314	100.00
Democratic gain from Republican			

== District 4 ==
=== General election ===
==== Polling ====
Poll source	Date(s)	Sample size	Margin of error	Todd Tiahrt (R)	Jim Lawing (D)	Other / undecided (Note: Calculated by taking the difference of 100% and all other candidates combined.)
SurveyUSA	October 21, 1998	500	—	56%	40%	4%

==== Results ====
Kansas's 4th congressional district election, 1998
Party	Candidate	Votes	%
Republican	Todd Tiahrt (incumbent)	94,785	58.26
Democratic	Jim Lawing	62,737	38.56
Constitution	Craig Newland	5,171	3.18
Total votes		162,693	100.00
Republican hold			
