= Kansas's 1st congressional district =

U.S. House district for Kansas

Coordinates: 38.61687°N 95.27344°W

- Interactive map of district boundaries since January 3, 2023
- Representative: Tracey Mann; R–Salina
- Population (2025): 730,678
- Median household income: $71,063
- Ethnicity: 78.9% White; 15.5% Hispanic; 10.7% Two or more races; 4.9% other; 2.6% Black; 1.7% Asian; 0.8% Native American
- Cook PVI: R+16

Kansas's 1st congressional district is a congressional district in the U.S. state of Kansas. Commonly known as "The Big First", the district encompasses all or part of 60 counties spanning more than half of the state, making it the seventh-largest district in the nation that does not cover an entire state.

Located within the district are Manhattan, Salina, Dodge City, Garden City, Hays, McPherson, Hutchinson, and Lawrence. From 2011 to 2017, the district was represented by Republican Tim Huelskamp, who was originally elected in 2010 to succeed fellow Republican Jerry Moran, who in turn ran successfully for the U.S. Senate seat formerly held by Sam Brownback. Huelskamp was re-elected twice in 2012 and 2014 but lost the 2016 Republican primary for a fourth term to obstetrician Roger Marshall.

Marshall won re-election in 2018, then he was elected to the United States Senate in 2020. He was replaced in the House by former Lieutenant Governor Tracey Mann of Salina. Mann is the first representative for the district to reside east of US Highway 281 since the district assumed its current configuration in the 88th Congress.

With a Cook Partisan Voting Index rating of R+16, it is the most Republican district in Kansas. Republicans dominate every level of government, often winning by over 65 percent of the vote on the occasion that they face any opposition at all. Since its creation in 1875, it has elected a Democrat once (Note: The only Democrat elected is Howard Shultz Miller, who won election to the 83rd United States Congress in 1952. He was ousted in 1954 by Republican William H. Avery, who served until 1962 across the 84th, 85th, 86th, and 87th Congresses.) In general, Riley County and Douglas County are the only counties in the district where Democrats are competitive, due to the sizable presence of the University of Kansas and Kansas State University. It covers two time zones (it includes all of Kansas's share of the Mountain Time Zone) and parts of three television markets (Topeka and Wichita, as well as Lincoln, Nebraska). Due to its size, its congressman usually becomes a statewide political figure. As confirmation, since it assumed its present configuration in 1963, four of the district's former congressmen were later elected to the U.S. Senate: Bob Dole, Pat Roberts, Jerry Moran and Roger Marshall.

The district typically gives its congressmen very long tenures in Washington. From 1963 until 2011, it was held by just four members: Dole, Keith Sebelius, Roberts and Moran.

== History ==
Kansas had a single representative in the U.S. House of Representatives until after the 1870 U.S. census, which showed that the state was entitled to three members of the lower chamber of the national legislature. In 1872 three representatives-at-large were elected, but by the act of March 2, 1874, the legislature divided the state into three districts. The 1st congressional district was composed of the counties of Leavenworth, Doniphan, Brown, Nemaha, Marshall, Washington, Republic, Jewell, Smith, Phillips, Norton, Graham, Rooks, Osborne, Mitchell, Cloud, Clay, Ottawa, Ellis, Ellsworth, Russell, Saline, Dickinson, Lincoln, Riley, Pottawatomie, Jackson, Jefferson, Atchison, Davis (Geary), "and all that territory lying north of the second standard parallel".

No changes were made in until after the 1880 U.S. census, which gave the state seven representatives. On March 5, 1883, Governor George Washington Glick approved an act of the legislature which reduced the 1st congressional district to only include the counties of Nemaha, Brown, Doniphan, Pottawatomie, Jackson, Atchison, Jefferson and Leavenworth. The apportionment was amended by the act of March 13, 1897, which placed Shawnee County in the 1st congressional district and Pottawatomie County in the 4th congressional district.

Although the 1890 U.S. census showed the population of Kansas to be large enough to entitle the state to eight representatives, no additional district was created until 1905. By the act of March 9, 1905, the state was divided into eight districts with the 1st congressional district being composed of the counties of Nemaha, Brown, Doniphan, Jackson, Atchison, Jefferson, Leavenworth and Shawnee.

The district's current configuration dates from the 1960 U.S. census, when Kansas was reduced from six districts to five. The old 2nd congressional district was eliminated, and most of its territory was merged with the old 6th congressional district—represented by Bob Dole—to form the new 1st district. It has remained more or less the same since then, and has been considerably enlarged due to the state's population shifts to the eastern side of the state bordering Missouri.

The state's current districting dates from the 1990 U.S. census, when Kansas was reduced from five districts to four. The current borders were established in 2012 by a panel of three federal judges, after the Kansas Legislature failed to pass new district maps.

Reapportionment in 2022 moved the entirety of Lawrence, home of one of the state's universities, The University of Kansas, from the 2nd congressional district to the 1st congressional district. Most of Jackson, all of Jefferson and the remaining part of Marshall counties moved from the 2nd congressional district to the district. The entirety of Marshall County is now in the district. The counties of Chase, Geary, Lyon, Marion, Morris and Wabaunsee all moved from the district to the 2nd congressional district. Also, more of Pawnee County moved to the 4th congressional district although the county still remains split.

=== 2000 census demographics ===
Following redistricting after the U.S. census in 2000, there were 672,091 people, 260,490 households, and 177,858 families residing in the district. The population density was 11.7 per square mile (4.5/km^{2}) over a land area of 57,373 square miles (148,595 km^{2}) (roughly the same size as the state of Illinois). There were 292,436 housing units at an average density of 5.1 per square mile (2.0/km^{2}). The racial makeup of the district is 89.02% White, 2.14% Black or African American, 0.95% Asian, 0.52% Native American, 0.05% Pacific Islander, 5.62% from other races, and 1.70% from two or more races. Hispanic or Latino of any race were 10.85% of the population.

There were 260,490 households, out of which 34.52% had children under the age of 18 living with them, 57.30% were married couples living together, 7.65% had a female householder with no husband present, and 31.72% were non-families. 27.58% of all households were made up of individuals, and 12.75% had someone living alone who was 65 years of age or older. The average household size was 2.49 and the average family size was 3.05.

In the district the population distribution by age was 26.46% under the age of 18, 9.50% from 18 to 24, 26.27% from 25 to 44, 21.41% from 45 to 64, and 16.36% who were 65 years of age or older. The median age was 36.9 years. For every 100 females there were 98.60 males. For every 100 females age 18 and over, there were 95.80 males.

The median income for a household in the district is $34,869, and the median income for a family was $42,292. Males had a median income of $29,662 versus $20,851 for females. The per capita income for the district was $17,255. About 7.8% of families and 11.0% of the population were below the poverty line, including 13.4% of those under age 18 and 9.0% of those age 65 or over.

Among the population aged 16 years and older, 65.1% was in the civilian labor force and 0.4% were in the armed forces. Of the employed civilian workers, 16.3% were government workers and 11.4% were self-employed. Management, professional, and related occupations employed 29.4% of the work force and sales and office occupations an additional 23.4%. Only 2.7% were employed in farming, fishing, and forestry occupations. The largest employment by industry was: educational, health and social services, 22.7%; manufacturing, 13.8%; retail trade, 11.7%; and agriculture, forestry, fishing and hunting, and mining, 10.1%.

== Composition ==
The 1st district includes the entirety of the following counties with the exception of Douglas and Jackson, which it shares with the 2nd district, and Pawnee, which it shares with the 4th district. The only Douglas County city within the district is Lawrence (portions of which are also shared with the 2nd district); Jackson County cities include Soldier, Circleville, Holton, Denison, Mayetta, Hoyt, and Delia; Pawnee County cities within the district include Burdett, Rozel, and portions of Larned.

#	County	Seat	Population
9	Barton	Great Bend	24,899
23	Cheyenne	St. Francis	2,636
25	Clark	Ashland	1,847
27	Clay	Clay Center	8,007
29	Cloud	Concordia	8,854
39	Decatur	Oberlin	2,712
41	Dickinson	Abilene	18,445
45	Douglas	Lawrence	120,553
51	Ellis	Hays	28,810
53	Ellsworth	Ellsworth	6,357
55	Finney	Garden City	37,466
57	Ford	Dodge City	33,980
63	Gove	Gove City	2,735
65	Graham	Hill City	2,376
67	Grant	Ulysses	7,147
69	Gray	Cimarron	5,743
71	Greeley	Tribune	1,181
75	Hamilton	Syracuse	2,437
81	Haskell	Sublette	3,630
83	Hodgeman	Jetmore	1,655
85	Jackson	Holton	13,368
87	Jefferson	Oskaloosa	18,327
89	Jewell	Mankato	2,847
93	Kearney	Lakin	3,823
101	Lane	Dighton	1,529
105	Lincoln	Lincoln	2,920
109	Logan	Oakley	2,665
113	McPherson	McPherson	30,091
117	Marshall	Marysville	9,933
119	Meade	Meade	3,911
123	Mitchell	Beloit	5,719
129	Morton	Elkhart	2,580
135	Ness	Ness City	2,618
137	Norton	Norton	5,330
141	Osborne	Osborne	3,427
143	Ottawa	Minneapolis	5,818
145	Pawnee	Larned	6,126
147	Phillips	Phillipsburg	4,761
149	Pottawatomie	Westmoreland	26,382
153	Rawlins	Atwood	2,463
155	Reno	Hutchinson	61,497
157	Republic	Belleville	4,627
159	Rice	Lyons	9,260
161	Riley	Manhattan	71,402
163	Rooks	Stockton	4,778
165	Rush	La Crosse	2,830
167	Russell	Russell	6,723
169	Saline	Salina	53,098
171	Scott	Scott City	4,922
175	Seward	Liberal	21,067
179	Sheridan	Hoxie	2,423
181	Sherman	Goodland	5,844
183	Smith	Smith Center	3,590
187	Stanton	Johnson City	1,901
189	Stevens	Hugoton	5,077
193	Thomas	Colby	7,865
195	Trego	WaKeeney	2,731
199	Wallace	Sharon Springs	1,509
201	Washington	Washington	5,504
203	Wichita	Leoti	2,082

== List of members representing the district ==
Member (District residence)	Party	Years	Cong ress	Electoral history	District map and location
District created March 4, 1875
William A. Phillips (Salina)	Republican	March 4, 1875 – March 3, 1879	44th 45th	Redistricted from the at-large district and Re-elected in 1874. Re-elected in 1876. Lost renomination.	
John A. Anderson (Manhattan)	Republican	March 4, 1879 – March 3, 1885	46th 47th 48th	Elected in 1878. Re-elected in 1880. Re-elected in 1882. Redistricted to the 5th district.	
Edmund N. Morrill (Hiawatha)	Republican	March 4, 1885 – March 3, 1891	49th 50th 51st	Redistricted from the at-large district and re-elected in 1884. Re-elected in 1886. Re-elected in 1888. Retired.	
Case Broderick (Holton)	Republican	March 4, 1891 – March 3, 1899	52nd 53rd 54th 55th	Elected in 1890. Re-elected in 1892. Re-elected in 1894. Re-elected in 1896. Lost renomination.	
Charles Curtis (Topeka)	Republican	March 4, 1899 – January 28, 1907	56th 57th 58th 59th	Redistricted from the 4th district and re-elected in 1898. Re-elected in 1900. Re-elected in 1902. Re-elected in 1904. Re-elected in 1906 but resigned when elected U.S. senator.	
Daniel R. Anthony Jr. (Leavenworth)	Republican	May 23, 1907 – March 3, 1929	60th 61st 62nd 63rd 64th 65th 66th 67th 68th 69th 70th	Elected to finish Curtis's term. Re-elected in 1908. Re-elected in 1910. Re-elected in 1912. Re-elected in 1914. Re-elected in 1916. Re-elected in 1918. Re-elected in 1920. Re-elected in 1922. Re-elected in 1924. Re-elected in 1926. Retired.	
William Lambertson (Fairview)	Republican	March 4, 1929 – January 3, 1945	71st 72nd 73rd 74th 75th 76th 77th 78th	Elected in 1928. Re-elected in 1930. Re-elected in 1932. Re-elected in 1934. Re-elected in 1936. Re-elected in 1938. Re-elected in 1940. Re-elected in 1942. Lost renomination.	
Albert M. Cole (Holton)	Republican	January 3, 1945 – January 3, 1953	79th 80th 81st 82nd	Elected in 1944. Re-elected in 1946. Re-elected in 1948. Re-elected in 1950. Lost re-election.	
Howard S. Miller (Hiawatha)	Democratic	January 3, 1953 – January 3, 1955	83rd	Elected in 1952. Lost re-election.	
William H. Avery (Wakefield)	Republican	January 3, 1955 – January 3, 1963	84th 85th 86th 87th	Elected in 1954. Re-elected in 1956. Re-elected in 1958. Re-elected in 1960. Redistricted to the 2nd district.	
Bob Dole (Russell)	Republican	January 3, 1963 – January 3, 1969	88th 89th 90th	Redistricted from the 6th district and re-elected in 1962. Re-elected in 1964. Re-elected in 1966. Retired to run for U.S. senator.	
Keith Sebelius (Norton)	Republican	January 3, 1969 – January 3, 1981	91st 92nd 93rd 94th 95th 96th	Elected in 1968. Re-elected in 1970. Re-elected in 1972. Re-elected in 1974. Re-elected in 1976. Re-elected in 1978. Retired.	
Pat Roberts (Dodge City)	Republican	January 3, 1981 – January 3, 1997	97th 98th 99th 100th 101st 102nd 103rd 104th	Elected in 1980. Re-elected in 1982. Re-elected in 1984. Re-elected in 1986. Re-elected in 1988. Re-elected in 1990. Re-elected in 1992. Re-elected in 1994. Retired to run for U.S. senator.	
Jerry Moran (Hays)	Republican	January 3, 1997 – January 3, 2011	105th 106th 107th 108th 109th 110th 111th	Elected in 1996. Re-elected in 1998. Re-elected in 2000. Re-elected in 2002. Re-elected in 2004. Re-elected in 2006. Re-elected in 2008. Retired to run for U.S. senator.	
Jerry Moran (Hays)	Republican	January 3, 1997 – January 3, 2011	105th 106th 107th 108th 109th 110th 111th	Elected in 1996. Re-elected in 1998. Re-elected in 2000. Re-elected in 2002. Re-elected in 2004. Re-elected in 2006. Re-elected in 2008. Retired to run for U.S. senator.	2003–2013
Tim Huelskamp (Fowler)	Republican	January 3, 2011 – January 3, 2017	112th 113th 114th	Elected in 2010. Re-elected in 2012. Re-elected in 2014. Lost renomination.	2003–2013
Tim Huelskamp (Fowler)	Republican	January 3, 2011 – January 3, 2017	112th 113th 114th	Elected in 2010. Re-elected in 2012. Re-elected in 2014. Lost renomination.	2013–2023
Roger Marshall (Great Bend)	Republican	January 3, 2017 – January 3, 2021	115th 116th	Elected in 2016. Re-elected in 2018. Retired to run for U.S. senator.	2013–2023
Tracey Mann (Salina)	Republican	January 3, 2021 – present	117th 118th 119th	Elected in 2020. Re-elected in 2022. Re-elected in 2024. Re-elected in 2026.	2013–2023
Tracey Mann (Salina)	Republican	January 3, 2021 – present	117th 118th 119th	Elected in 2020. Re-elected in 2022. Re-elected in 2024. Re-elected in 2026.	2023–present

== Recent election results from statewide races ==
Year	Office	Results
2008	President	McCain 62% - 35%
2008	Senate	Roberts 70% - 30%
2012	President	Romney 65% - 32%
2016	President	Trump 63% - 30%
2016	Senate	Moran 70% - 25%
2018	Governor	Kobach 46% - 43%
2018	Secretary of State	Schwab 57% - 40%
2018	Attorney General	Schmidt 66% - 34%
2018	Treasurer	LaTurner 64% - 36%
2020	President	Trump 64% - 34%
2020	Senate	Marshall 60% - 35%
2022	Senate	Moran 68% - 29%
2022	Governor	Schmidt 52% - 44%
2022	Secretary of State	Schwab 66% - 31%
2022	Attorney General	Kobach 57% - 43%
2022	Treasurer	Johnson 62% - 34%
2024	President	Trump 65% - 33%

== Recent election results ==
=== 2002 ===
Kansas's 1st congressional district election (2002)
Party	Candidate	Votes	%
Republican	Jerry Moran*	186,850	91.10
Libertarian	Jack Warner	18,250	8.90
Total votes		205,100	100.00
Turnout			
Republican hold			

=== 2004 ===
Kansas's 1st congressional district election (2004)
Party	Candidate	Votes	%
Republican	Jerry Moran*	239,776	90.72
Libertarian	Jack Warner	24,517	9.28
Total votes		264,293	100.00
Turnout			
Republican hold			

=== 2006 ===
Kansas's 1st congressional district election (2006)
Party	Candidate	Votes	%
Republican	Jerry Moran*	153,298	78.65
Democratic	John Doll	38,820	19.92
Reform	Sylvester Cain	2,792	1.43
Total votes		194,910	100.00
Turnout			
Republican hold			

=== 2008 ===
Kansas's 1st congressional district election (2008)
Party	Candidate	Votes	%
Republican	Jerry Moran*	214,549	81.88
Democratic	James Bordonaro	34,771	13.27
Reform	Kathleen Burton	7,145	2.73
Libertarian	Jack Warner	5,562	2.12
Total votes		262,027	100.00
Turnout			
Republican hold			

=== 2010 ===
Kansas's 1st congressional district election (2010)
Party	Candidate	Votes	%
Republican	Tim Huelskamp	142,281	73.76
Democratic	Alan Jilka	44,068	22.85
Libertarian	Jack Warner	6,537	3.39
Total votes		192,886	100.00
Turnout			
Republican hold			

=== 2012 ===
Kansas's 1st congressional district election (2012)
Party	Candidate	Votes	%
Republican	Tim Huelskamp (incumbent)	211,337	100
Total votes		211,337	100
Republican hold			

=== 2014 ===
Kansas's 1st congressional district election (2014)
Party	Candidate	Votes	%
Republican	Tim Huelskamp (incumbent)	138,764	67.97
Democratic	James Sherow	65,397	32.03
Total votes		204,161	100
Republican hold			

=== 2016 ===
Kansas's 1st congressional district election (2016)
Party	Candidate	Votes	%
Republican	Roger Marshall	166,051	66.24%
Independent	Alan LaPolice	66,218	26.41%
Libertarian	Kerry Burt	18,415	7.35%
Total votes		250,684	100%
Republican hold			

=== 2018 ===
Kansas's 1st congressional district election (2018)
Party	Candidate	Votes	%
Republican	Roger Marshall (incumbent)	153,082	68.1
Democratic	Alan LaPolice	71,558	31.9
Total votes		224,640	100.0
Republican hold			

=== 2020 ===
Kansas's 1st congressional district election (2020)
Party	Candidate	Votes	%
Republican	Tracey Mann	208,229	71.2
Democratic	Kali Barnett	84,393	28.8
Total votes		292,622	100.0
Republican hold			

=== 2022 ===
Kansas's 1st congressional district election (2022)
Party	Candidate	Votes	%
Republican	Tracey Mann (incumbent)	161,333	67.7
Democratic	Jimmy Beard	77,092	32.3
Total votes		238,425	100.0
Republican hold			

=== 2024 ===
Kansas's 1st congressional district election (2024)
Party	Candidate	Votes	%
Republican	Tracey Mann (incumbent)	210,493	69.1
Democratic	Paul Buskirk	93,965	30.9
Total votes		304,458	100.0
Republican hold			

== See also ==
- Kansas's congressional delegations
- Kansas's congressional districts
- List of United States congressional districts
