= 2002 United States House of Representatives elections in Kansas =

- November 5th, 2002

All 4 Kansas seats to the United States House of Representatives
	Majority party	Minority party
Party	Republican	Democratic
Last election	3	1
Seats won	3	1
Seat change	Steady	Steady
Popular vote	536,026	259,911
Percentage	64.59%	31.32%
Swing	▲1.22%	▼0.29%

Republican
50–60%
60–70%
70–80%
80–90%
>90%
Democratic
50–60%
70–80%

The 2002 United States House of Representatives elections in Kansas were held on November 5, 2002, to determine who will represent the state of Kansas in the United States House of Representatives. Kansas has four seats in the House, apportioned according to the 2000 United States census. Representatives are elected for two-year terms.

== Overview ==
United States House of Representatives elections in Kansas, 2002
Party	Votes	Percentage	Seats	+/–
Republican	536,026	64.59%	3	-
Democratic	259,911	31.32%	1	-
Libertarian	28,907	3.48%	0	-
Reform	5,046	0.61%	0	-
Totals	829,890	100.00%	4	-

== District 1 ==
2002 Kansas's 1st congressional district election

Nominee	Jerry Moran	Jack Warner
Party	Republican	Libertarian
Popular vote	189,976	18,585
Percentage	91.1%	8.9%
U.S. Representative before election
Jerry Moran
Republican
Elected U.S. Representative
Jerry Moran
Republican

=== Predictions ===
Source	Ranking	As of
Sabato's Crystal Ball	Safe R	November 4, 2002
New York Times	Safe R	October 14, 2002

2000 Kansas's 1st congressional district election
Party	Candidate	Votes	%
Republican	Jerry Moran (incumbent)	189,976	91.09%
Libertarian	Jack Warner	18,585	8.91%
Total votes		208,561	100.00%

== District 2 ==
2002 Kansas's 2nd congressional district election
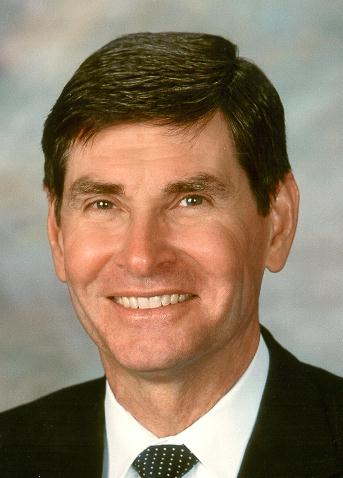

Nominee	Jim Ryun	Dan Lykins
Party	Republican	Democratic
Popular vote	127,477	79,160
Percentage	60.4%	37.5%
U.S. Representative before election
Jim Ryun
Republican
Elected U.S. Representative
Jim Ryun
Republican

=== Predictions ===
Source	Ranking	As of
Sabato's Crystal Ball	Safe R	November 4, 2002
New York Times	Likely R	October 14, 2002

2000 Kansas's 2nd congressional district election
Party	Candidate	Votes	%
Republican	Jim Ryun (incumbent)	127,477	60.42%
Democratic	Dan Lykins	79,160	37.52%
Libertarian	Art Clack	4,340	2.06%
Total votes		210,977	100.00%

== District 3 ==
2002 Kansas's 3rd congressional district election

Nominee	Dennis Moore	Adam Taff
Party	Democratic	Republican
Popular vote	110,095	102,882
Percentage	50.2%	46.9%
U.S. Representative before election
Dennis Moore
Democratic
Elected U.S. Representative
Dennis Moore
Democratic

=== Predictions ===
Source	Ranking	As of
Sabato's Crystal Ball	Lean D	November 4, 2002
New York Times	Lean D	October 14, 2002

2000 Kansas's 3rd congressional district election
Party	Candidate	Votes	%
Democratic	Dennis Moore (incumbent)	110,095	50.18%
Republican	Adam Taff	102,882	46.89%
Reform	Dawn Bly	5,046	2.30%
Libertarian	Douglas Martin	1,366	0.62%
Total votes		219,389	100.00%

== District 4 ==
2002 Kansas's 4th congressional district election
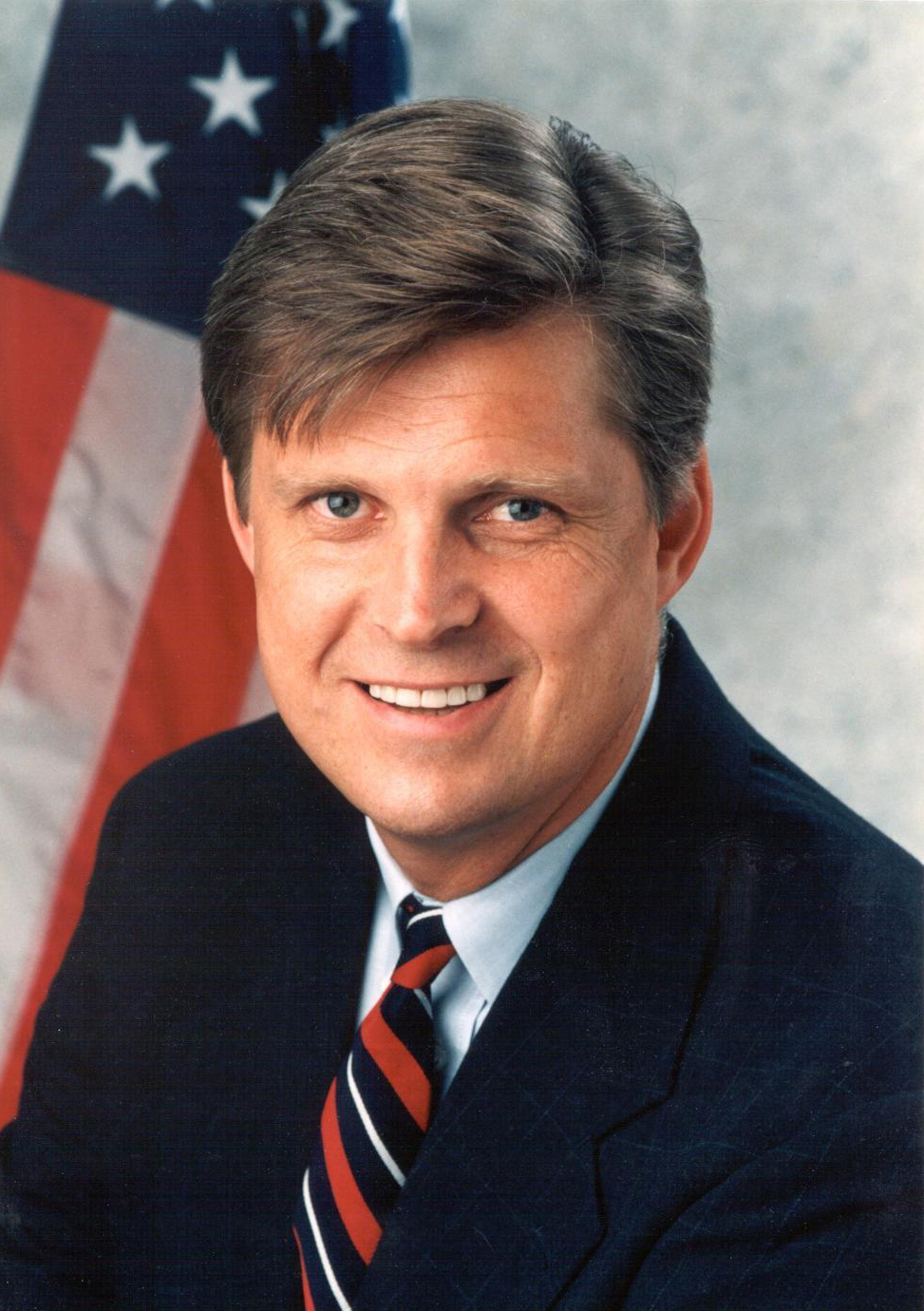

Nominee	Todd Tiahrt	Carlos Nolla
Party	Republican	Democratic
Popular vote	115,691	70,656
Percentage	60.6%	37.0%
U.S. Representative before election
Todd Tiahrt
Republican
Elected U.S. Representative
Todd Tiahrt
Republican

=== Predictions ===
Source	Ranking	As of
Sabato's Crystal Ball	Safe R	November 4, 2002
New York Times	Safe R	October 14, 2002

2000 Kansas's 4th congressional district election
Party	Candidate	Votes	%
Republican	Todd Tiahrt (incumbent)	115,691	60.58%
Democratic	Carlos Nolla	70,656	37.00%
Libertarian	Maike Warren	4,616	2.42%
Total votes		190,963	100.00%
