= Thomas Ryan (Kansas politician) =

American politician (1837–1914)

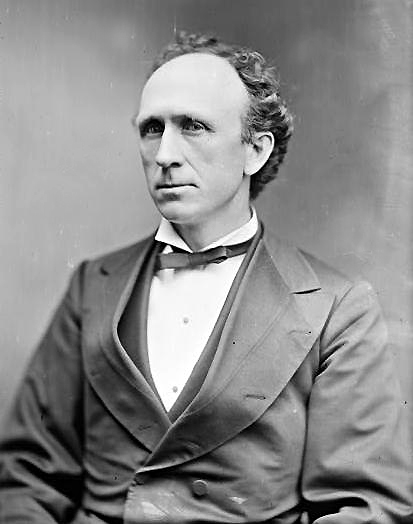
- Ryan, 1865–1880

Member of the U.S. House of Representatives from Kansas
- In office March 4, 1877 – April 4, 1889
- Preceded by: William R. Brown (3rd); District established (4th)
- Succeeded by: Bishop W. Perkins (3rd); Harrison Kelley (4th)
- Constituency: 3rd district (1877-85); 4th district (1885-89)

Personal details
- Born: November 25, 1837 Oxford, New York, US
- Died: April 5, 1914 (aged 76) Muskogee, Oklahoma, US
- Party: Republican
- Profession: Politician, Lawyer

Thomas Ryan (November 25, 1837 – April 5, 1914) was a nineteenth-century politician and lawyer from Kansas.

== Formative years ==
Born in Oxford, New York on November 25, 1837, Ryan moved to Bradford County, Pennsylvania with his parents, attended Dickinson Seminary in Williamsport, Pennsylvania, studied law and was admitted to the bar in 1861.

During the Civil War, he served in the Union Army from 1862 to 1864.

== Career ==
Following his military service, Ryan moved to Topeka, Kansas, where he served as prosecuting attorney of Shawnee County, Kansas from 1865 to 1873. He was then appointed as an assistant United States Attorney for Kansas from 1873 to 1877.

In 1876, he was elected as a Republican to the United States House of Representatives. After serving in that capacity from 1877 to 1889, he was appointed Ambassador to Mexico by President Benjamin Harrison in 1889, a post he held until 1893.

On March 31, 1897, Ryan was appointed as Assistant Secretary of the Interior by President William McKinley after being recommended by Congressman Charles Curtis. He served in that capacity until 1907 when he was sent to Muskogee, Oklahoma as the personal resident representative of the Secretary of the Interior. He held that post until his death.

== Death and interment ==
Ryan died in Muskogee on April 5, 1914. His body was returned to Topeka, Kansas and interred in the Topeka Cemetery.

U.S. House of Representatives
Preceded by William R. Brown	Member of the U.S. House of Representatives from Kansas's 3rd congressional district March 4, 1877 – March 3, 1885	Succeeded by Bishop W. Perkins
Preceded by (none)	Member of the U.S. House of Representatives from Kansas's 4th congressional district March 4, 1885 – April 4, 1889	Succeeded by Harrison Kelley
Diplomatic posts
Preceded by Edward S. Bragg	United States Ambassador to Mexico; March 30, 1889 – May 27, 1893	Succeeded by Isaac P. Gray
