= Kansas's 4th congressional district =

U.S. House district for Kansas

Coordinates: 37.5°N 97.2°W

- Interactive map of district boundaries since January 3, 2023
- Representative: Ron Estes; R–Wichita
- Distribution: 78.90% urban; 21.10% rural
- Population (2025): 747,953
- Median household income: $73,837
- Ethnicity: 69.6% White; 13.5% Hispanic; 6.6% Black; 5.7% Two or more races; 3.3% Asian; 0.9% Native American; 0.5% other
- Cook PVI: R+12

Kansas's 4th congressional district is a congressional district in the U.S. state of Kansas. Based in the south central part of the state, the district encompasses the city of Wichita, the largest city in Kansas, three universities, Arkansas City, and the State of Kansas's only national airport.

The 4th congressional district is historically a strongly Republican district, almost exclusively represented, over the last half century, by Republicans—with the sole exception of moderate Democrat Dan Glickman, who lost his bid for re-election to a 10th term in 1994.

As of mid-April 2017 (following a special election to fill the district seat left vacant by Mike Pompeo's resignation to become CIA Director), no other Democrat has won election to the Congressional seat lost by Glickman, which has since gone to conservative, anti-abortion Republicans, routinely, by a roughly two-to-one margin in subsequent races—with the exception of the April 11, 2017 special election, in which Democrat James Thompson managed to narrow the gap with Republican victor Ron Estes to only 6.2%.

== History ==
Since the 1980s (and peaking with the 1991 Summer of Mercy protests), the district's major city, Wichita (where most 4th district voters reside), is often referred to in national media as the center, or "ground zero", of the nation's anti-abortion movement—a primary factor that Glickman has credited for his defeat,—and which has remained a major influence in 4th district politics, with all three of Glickman's successors (Todd Tiahrt, Mike Pompeo and Ron Estes) claiming strong anti-abortion views. In the 2017 Special Election to fill Pompeo's vacated seat, a critical factor in Estes' unusually narrow victory over the Democrat (James Thompson) was a string of last-minute ads tying Thompson to his pro-abortion stance.

=== Redistricting ===
In 2012, a feud between conservative and moderate Republicans in the Kansas Legislature stymied progress on mandatory decennial redistricting (boundary changes to reflect new demographic data from the decennial census). With elections approaching, the federal courts intervened and drew the district boundaries, shifting the fourth district westward, into more conservative territory.

=== 2016 elections ===
In the 2016 general election, incumbent Republican Mike Pompeo was overwhelmingly re-elected to the seat, with a 31% (85,000-vote) lead over his Democratic rival. However, President-elect Donald Trump then nominated him as Director of the Central Intelligence Agency, and upon Pompeo's Congressional confirmation as CIA Director in January 2017, Pompeo resigned his Congressional seat, leaving it vacant—forcing Kansas Governor Sam Brownback to call a special election, set for April 11, 2017, to fill Pompeo's vacated Congressional seat. (as happened with Pompeo's previous Democratic challengers).

=== 2017 special election ===
Kansas Governor Sam Brownback, acting on his authority, announced a special election would be held on April 11, 2017, to fill the vacancy left by Rep. Pompeo's resignation. Republican, Democratic, and Libertarian parties would select their nominees through district caucuses, run by the respective party organizations, voting through delegates selected by their respective party rules. It would be the first Congressional election since the 2016 national election, and thus drew national attention.

Republicans nominated Kansas State Treasurer Ron Estes. Democrats nominated civil-rights attorney James Thompson, a political novice. Libertarians nominated aviation instructor Chris Rockhold, also a political novice.

Initial assumptions were that this election's outcome was a foregone conclusion: The Republican would win overwhelmingly again. However, Democratic nominee Thompson, aided with numerous energetic supporters (particularly former local campaigners for Bernie Sanders, who had taken the 2016 Kansas Democratic Presidential Caucus by 75%), began to show signs of the first serious fourth district challenge to Republicans since Glickman's loss a quarter-century earlier.

The Thompson campaign raised about $254,000 by the final campaign finance-reporting deadline, and over 97% was from individual donors—with a last-minute infusion of only $10,000 from the state party, reflecting a lack of support from his state party and national organizations. By comparison, Estes raised about $318,000—plus another $94,000 from the National Republican Congressional Committee (NRCC) after the filing deadline—largely from outside groups and big (over $1,000) donors.

The Thompson campaign emphasized Thompson's working-class progressive credentials, telling the story of his childhood poverty and use of education as a ladder to opportunity. Another key focus was his status as a U.S. Army veteran and advocacy for Second Amendment rights, featuring images of him firing his assault rifle. The campaign strongly emphasized his desire to defend the Constitution, inferring a reference to President Trump. The Thompson campaign attempted to focus public attention on Estes' close connections to exceptionally unpopular Governor Sam Brownback. In response, Estes and the Republican party simply branded Thompson as "too liberal for Kansas." Estes' low-key campaign included refusing to attend several debates with Thompson and Libertarian candidate Rockhold. However, last-minute Republican ads—with retouched photos—depicted Thompson with House Minority Leader Nancy Pelosi, and focused on Thompson's abortion-rights beliefs (rather falsely, Thompson and some others argued, but essentially accurate, others have said), with apparent impact.

In the last two weeks of the election, Republicans responded with a flurry of ads, especially abortion-focused ads, largely from national Republican party organizations. Robo-calls from President Trump and Vice President Mike Pence flooded the fourth district, and Senator Ted Cruz—who had won the 2016 Kansas Republican presidential caucus—made a last-minute visit to the district to stump for Estes.

On election day—although advance voting returns indicated a substantial lead for Thompson, and Thompson narrowly secured a majority of the total Sedgwick County vote—a final tally of the in-person votes, combined with the advance ballots, eventually sorted out to give Estes (at 53% of the vote) the victory over Democrat Thompson (with 45% - about 8,500 fewer votes) and Libertarian Rockhold (at 2%, about 1,900 votes total). It was the closest that Democrats had come to retaking the seat since Glickman's 1994 loss, and though clearly the Republican won, analysts described the unusually close race as a sign of trouble for Republicans in the fourth district, and in Kansas, and nationally. Thompson immediately announced plans to run for the seat, again, in 2018.

=== 2018 regular election ===
In the 2018 election, the district's Republican incumbent for Congress was Representative Ron Estes. He was challenged in the primaries by a candidate with a similar name, Ron M. Estes. This led to a conundrum as to how the candidates should be distinguished on the ballot, with Kansas Secretary of State Kris Kobach claiming that Ron G. Estes can include the prefix "Rep." on the ballot according to Kansas law, although Ron M. Estes claimed that this was unfair. Ron G. Estes, the incumbent, won the primary with more than 80% of the vote. In the Democratic primary for Congress, Laura Lombard lost to James Thompson, who was defeated by Ron G. Estes in the 2017 special election. In the general election, Ron Estes was re-elected, defeating James Thompson by a large margin.

=== 2000 demographics ===
Most of the approximately 670,000 citizens of the fourth district reside in the state's largest city, Wichita (approximate population 390,000), or the surrounding Sedgwick County (approximate population 511,000). Nearly all live within the Wichita MSA (approximate population 650,000). The rest live in small towns and rural areas in adjacent counties, and counties farther west and east.

Following redistricting after the 2000 U.S. census, there were 672,101 people, 261,106 households, and 177,358 families residing in the district. The population density was 70.5/mi^{2} over a land area of 9,531 square miles (24,690 km^{2}). There were 285,830 housing units at an average density of 30.0/mi^{2}. The racial makeup of the district is 83.56% White, 6.86% Black or African American, 2.44% Asian, 1.23% Native American, 0.05% Pacific Islander, 3.28% from other races, and 2.59% from two or more races. Hispanic or Latino people of any race were 6.57% of the population.

There were 261,106 households, out of which 36.53% had children under the age of 18 living with them, 53.87% were married couples living together, 10.14% had a female householder with no husband present, and 32.07% were non-families. 27.62% of all households were made up of individuals, and 9.99% had someone living alone who was 65 years of age or older. The average household size was 2.52 and the average family size was 3.10.

In the district the population distribution by age is 27.69% under the age of 18, 9.13% from 18 to 24, 28.98% from 25 to 44, 21.19% from 45 to 64, and 13.00% who were 65 years of age or older. The median age was 35.0 years. For every 100 females there were 97.32 males. For every 100 females age 18 and over, there were 94.67 males.

The median income for a household in the district is $40,917, and the median income for a family was $49,650. Males had a median income of $36,701 versus $25,237 for females. The per capita income for the district was $20,041. About 7.0% of families and 9.6% of the population were below the poverty line, including 12.1% of those under age 18 and 7.6% of those age 65 or over.

Among the population aged 16 years and older, 66.4% was in the civilian labor force and 0.6% were in the armed forces. Of the employed civilian workers, 12.5% were government workers and 6.7% were self-employed. Management, professional, and related occupations employed 31.5% of the work force and sales and office occupations an additional 25.5%. Only 0.5% are employed in farming, fishing, and forestry occupations. The largest employment by industry was: manufacturing, 24.1%; educational, health and social services, 20.8%; and retail trade, 11.0%. Agriculture, forestry, fishing and hunting, and mining industries only employed 2.0%.

== Composition ==
The 4th district includes the entirety of the following counties with the exception of Pawnee, which it shares with the 1st district. Pawnee County cities within the 4th district include Garfield and portions of Larned.

#	County	Seat	Population
7	Barber	Medicine Lodge	4,071
15	Butler	El Dorado	68,632
19	Chautauqua	Sedan	3,347
33	Comanche	Coldwater	1,655
35	Cowley	Winfield	34,157
47	Edwards	Kinsley	2,733
49	Elk	Howard	2,467
73	Greenwood	Eureka	5,870
77	Harper	Anthony	5,435
79	Harvey	Newton	33,504
95	Kingman	Kingman	7,066
97	Kiowa	Greensburg	2,374
145	Pawnee	Larned	6,126
151	Pratt	Pratt	9,082
173	Sedgwick	Wichita	528,469
185	Stafford	St. John	3,909
191	Sumner	Wellington	22,334

== List of members representing the district ==
Member	Party	Years	Cong ress	Electoral history	District maps
District created March 4, 1885
Thomas Ryan (Topeka)	Republican	March 4, 1885 – April 4, 1889	49th 50th 51st	Redistricted from the 3rd district and re-elected in 1884. Re-elected in 1886. Re-elected in 1888. Resigned to become U.S. Minister to Mexico.	
Vacant		April 4, 1889 – December 2, 1889	51st		
Harrison Kelley (Burlington)	Republican	December 2, 1889 – March 3, 1891	51st	Elected to finish Ryan's term. Retired.	
John G. Otis (Topeka)	Populist	March 4, 1891 – March 3, 1893	52nd	Elected in 1890. Lost renomination.	
Charles Curtis (Topeka)	Republican	March 4, 1893 – March 3, 1899	53rd 54th 55th	Elected in 1892. Re-elected in 1894. Re-elected in 1896. Redistricted to the 1st district.	
James M. Miller (Council Grove)	Republican	March 4, 1899 – March 3, 1911	56th 57th 58th 59th 60th 61st	Elected in 1898. Re-elected in 1900. Re-elected in 1902. Re-elected in 1904. Re-elected in 1906. Re-elected in 1908. Lost renomination.	
Fred S. Jackson (Eureka)	Republican	March 4, 1911 – March 3, 1913	62nd	Elected in 1910. Lost re-election.	
Dudley Doolittle (Strong City)	Democratic	March 4, 1913 – March 3, 1919	63rd 64th 65th	Elected in 1912. Re-elected in 1914. Re-elected in 1916. Lost re-election.	
Homer Hoch (Marion)	Republican	March 4, 1919 – March 3, 1933	66th 67th 68th 69th 70th 71st 72nd	Elected in 1918. Re-elected in 1920. Re-elected in 1922. Re-elected in 1924. Re-elected in 1926. Re-elected in 1928. Re-elected in 1930. Lost re-election.	
Randolph Carpenter (Marion)	Democratic	March 4, 1933 – January 3, 1937	73rd 74th	Elected in 1932. Re-elected in 1934. Retired.	
Edward H. Rees (Emporia)	Republican	January 3, 1937 – January 3, 1961	75th 76th 77th 78th 79th 80th 81st 82nd 83rd 84th 85th 86th	Elected in 1936. Re-elected in 1938. Re-elected in 1940. Re-elected in 1942. Re-elected in 1944. Re-elected in 1946. Re-elected in 1948. Re-elected in 1950. Re-elected in 1952. Re-elected in 1954. Re-elected in 1956. Re-elected in 1958. Retired.	
Garner E. Shriver (Wichita)	Republican	January 3, 1961 – January 3, 1977	87th 88th 89th 90th 91st 92nd 93rd 94th	Elected in 1960. Re-elected in 1962. Re-elected in 1964. Re-elected in 1966. Re-elected in 1968. Re-elected in 1970. Re-elected in 1972. Re-elected in 1974. Lost re-election.	
Dan Glickman (Wichita)	Democratic	January 3, 1977 – January 3, 1995	95th 96th 97th 98th 99th 100th 101st 102nd 103rd	Elected in 1976. Re-elected in 1978. Re-elected in 1980. Re-elected in 1982. Re-elected in 1984. Re-elected in 1986. Re-elected in 1988. Re-elected in 1990. Re-elected in 1992. Lost re-election.	
Todd Tiahrt (Goddard)	Republican	January 3, 1995 – January 3, 2011	104th 105th 106th 107th 108th 109th 110th 111th	Elected in 1994. Re-elected in 1996. Re-elected in 1998. Re-elected in 2000. Re-elected in 2002. Re-elected in 2004. Re-elected in 2006. Re-elected in 2008. Retired to run for U.S. Senator.	
Todd Tiahrt (Goddard)	Republican	January 3, 1995 – January 3, 2011	104th 105th 106th 107th 108th 109th 110th 111th	Elected in 1994. Re-elected in 1996. Re-elected in 1998. Re-elected in 2000. Re-elected in 2002. Re-elected in 2004. Re-elected in 2006. Re-elected in 2008. Retired to run for U.S. Senator.	2003–2013
Mike Pompeo (Wichita)	Republican	January 3, 2011 – January 23, 2017	112th 113th 114th 115th	Elected in 2010. Re-elected in 2012. Re-elected in 2014. Re-elected in 2016. Resigned to become Director of the Central Intelligence Agency.	2003–2013
Mike Pompeo (Wichita)	Republican	January 3, 2011 – January 23, 2017	112th 113th 114th 115th	Elected in 2010. Re-elected in 2012. Re-elected in 2014. Re-elected in 2016. Resigned to become Director of the Central Intelligence Agency.	2013–2023
Vacant		January 23, 2017 – April 11, 2017	115th		2013–2023
Ron Estes (Wichita)	Republican	April 11, 2017– present	115th 116th 117th 118th 119th	Elected to finish Pompeo's term. Re-elected in 2018. Re-elected in 2020. Re-elected in 2022. Re-elected in 2024. Re-elected in 2026.	2013–2023
Ron Estes (Wichita)	Republican	April 11, 2017– present	115th 116th 117th 118th 119th	Elected to finish Pompeo's term. Re-elected in 2018. Re-elected in 2020. Re-elected in 2022. Re-elected in 2024. Re-elected in 2026.	2023–present

== Recent election results from statewide races ==
Year	Office	Results
2008	President	McCain 58% - 39%
2008	Senate	Roberts 65% - 35%
2012	President	Romney 61% - 36%
2016	President	Trump 59% - 32%
2016	Senate	Moran 64% - 30%
2018	Governor	Kobach 45.4% - 44.7%
2018	Secretary of State	Schwab 54% - 43%
2018	Attorney General	Schmidt 62% - 38%
2018	Treasurer	LaTurner 61% - 39%
2020	President	Trump 60% - 38%
2020	Senate	Marshall 56% - 39%
2022	Senate	Moran 64% - 33%
2022	Governor	Schmidt 51% - 46%
2022	Secretary of State	Schwab 62% - 35%
2022	Attorney General	Kobach 55% - 45%
2022	Treasurer	Johnson 57% - 40%
2024	President	Trump 61% - 37%

== Recent election results ==
=== 2002 ===
Kansas's 4th Congressional District election (2002)
Party	Candidate	Votes	%
Republican	Todd Tiahrt*	114,354	60.68
Democratic	Carlos Nolla	69,560	36.91
Libertarian	Maike Warren	4,544	2.41
Total votes		188,458	100.00
Turnout			
Republican hold			

=== 2004 ===
Kansas's 4th Congressional District election (2004)
Party	Candidate	Votes	%
Republican	Todd Tiahrt*	173,151	66.11
Democratic	Michael Kinard	81,388	31.07
Libertarian	David Loomis	7,376	2.82
Total votes		261,915	100.00
Turnout			
Republican hold			

=== 2006 ===
Kansas's 4th Congressional District election (2006)
Party	Candidate	Votes	%
Republican	Todd Tiahrt*	113,676	63.69
Democratic	Garth J. McGinn	60,297	33.78
Reform	Joy Holt	4,516	2.53
Total votes		178,489	100.00
Turnout			
Republican hold			

=== 2008 ===
Kansas's 4th Congressional District election (2008)
Party	Candidate	Votes	%
Republican	Todd Tiahrt*	177,617	63.41
Democratic	Donald Betts, Jr.	90,706	32.38
Reform	Susan Ducey	6,441	2.30
Libertarian	Steven Rosile	5,345	1.91
Total votes		280,109	100.00
Turnout			
Republican hold			

=== 2010 ===
Kansas's 4th Congressional District election (2010)
Party	Candidate	Votes	%
Republican	Mike Pompeo	119,575	58.79
Democratic	Raj Goyle	74,143	36.46
Reform	Susan Ducey	5,041	2.48
Libertarian	Shawn S. Smith	4,624	2.94
Total votes		203,383	100.00
Turnout			
Republican hold			

=== 2012 ===
Kansas's 4th Congressional District election (2012)
Party	Candidate	Votes	%
Republican	Mike Pompeo (incumbent)	161,094	62.2
Democratic	Robert Leo Tillman	81,770	31.6
Libertarian	Thomas Jefferson	16,058	6.2
Total votes		258,922	100.00
Turnout			
Republican hold			

=== 2014 ===
Kansas's 4th Congressional District election (2014)
Party	Candidate	Votes	%
Republican	Mike Pompeo (incumbent)	138,757	66.66
Democratic	Perry Schuckman	69,396	33.34
Total votes		208,153	100.00
Turnout			
Republican hold			

=== 2016 ===
Kansas's 4th Congressional District election (2016)
Party	Candidate	Votes	%
Republican	Mike Pompeo (incumbent)	166,998	60.7
Democratic	Daniel Giroux	81,495	29.6
Independent	Miranda Allen	19,021	6.9
Libertarian	Gordon Bakken	7,737	2.8
Total votes		275,251	100.00
Turnout			
Republican hold			

=== 2017 special election ===
Kansas's 4th Congressional District special election (2017)
Party	Candidate	Votes	%
Republican	Ron Estes	63,505	52.5
Democratic	James Thompson	55,310	45.7
Libertarian	Chris Rockhold	2,082	1.7
Total votes		120,897	100.00
Republican hold			

=== 2018 ===
Kansas's 4th Congressional District election (2018)
Party	Candidate	Votes	%
Republican	Ron Estes (incumbent)	144,248	59.4
Democratic	James Thompson	98,445	40.6
Total votes		242,693	100.0
Republican hold			

=== 2020 ===
Kansas's 4th Congressional District election (2020)
Party	Candidate	Votes	%
Republican	Ron Estes (incumbent)	203,432	63.7
Democratic	Laura Lombard	116,166	36.3
Total votes		319,598	100.0
Republican hold			

=== 2022 ===
Kansas's 4th Congressional District election (2022)
Party	Candidate	Votes	%
Republican	Ron Estes (incumbent)	144,889	63.3
Democratic	Bob Hernandez	83,851	36.7
Total votes		228,740	100.0
Republican hold			

=== 2024 ===
Kansas's 4th Congressional District election (2024)
Party	Candidate	Votes	%
Republican	Ron Estes (incumbent)	198,465	65.0
Democratic	Esau Freeman	106,632	35.0
Total votes		305,097	100.0
Republican hold			

== Historical district boundaries ==
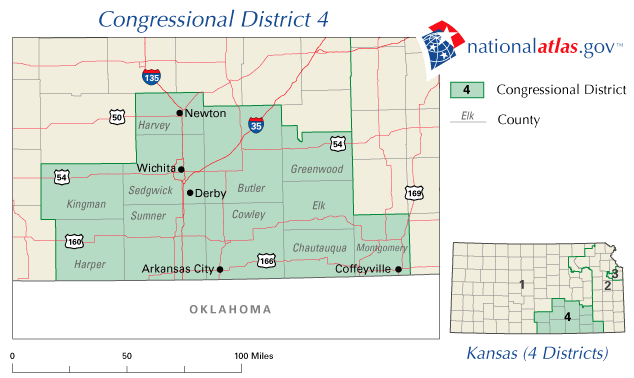
2003 – 2013

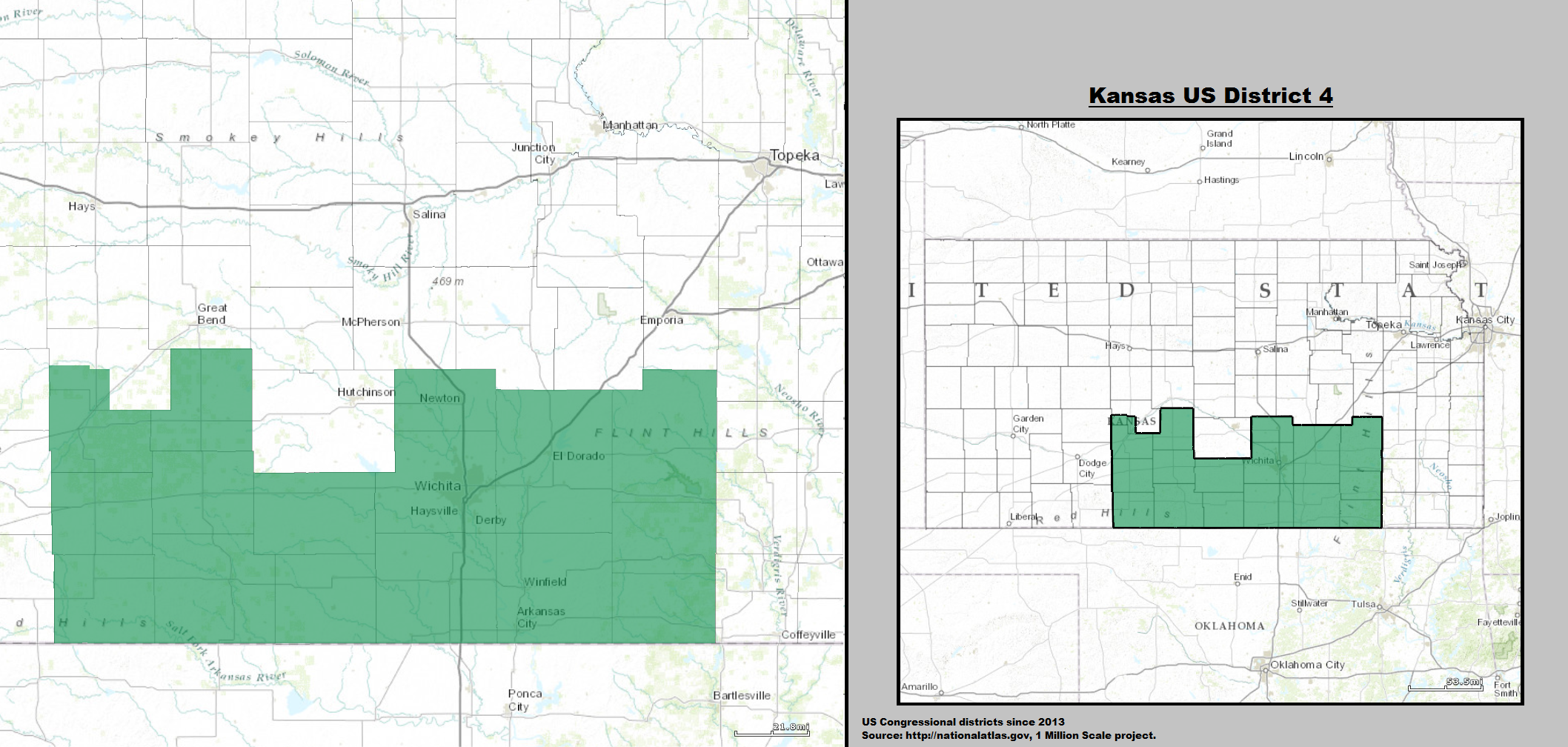
2013 - 2023

In 2012, in an unusual move, the federal courts intervened in Kansas's decennial redistricting (required by law to adjust boundaries of Congressional and state legislative districts every 10 years, to reflect changing population distributions, as reported by the decennial census).

Sharply criticizing the Legislature for the intractable feud between conservative and moderate factions in the Kansas Legislature (normally responsible for redistricting), and recognizing the rapidly approaching next elections, a federal three-judge panel (the Chief Justice of the 10th Circuit Court of Appeals and two judges from the Kansas City U.S. District Court) drew the Kansas state and Congressional district boundaries themselves, in rather simple and direct shapes that produced radical changes.

In the process, the 4th congressional district shifted west—still centered approximately on (and demographically dominated by) Wichita, The district's previous eastern boundary – Montgomery County and part of Greenwood County – were moved into another district, while the 4th district's western edge moved farther west, to include all of Pratt, Stafford, Barber, Kiowa, Comanche and Edwards counties, plus a slender section of southern Pawnee County. In the process, the Fourth acquired a more neatly rectangular shape, and sharply reduced the amount of counties divided between the Fourth and another district.

The map shown here indicates prior boundaries.

== See also ==
- Kansas's congressional delegations
- Kansas's congressional districts
- List of United States congressional districts
