= John G. Otis =

American politician

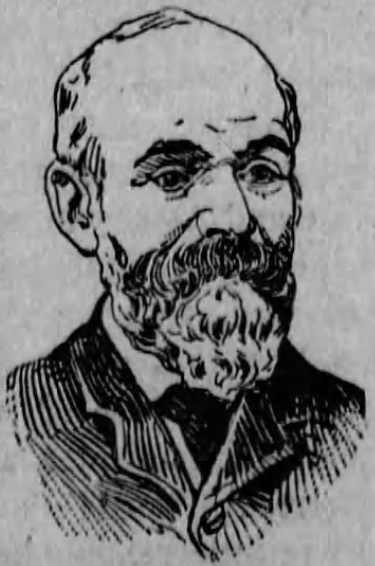

Member of the U.S. House of Representatives from Kansas's 4th district
- In office March 4, 1891 – March 3, 1893
- Preceded by: Harrison Kelley
- Succeeded by: Charles Curtis

Personal details
- Born: February 10, 1838 Danby, Vermont
- Died: February 22, 1916 (aged 78) Topeka, Kansas
- Party: Populist

John Grant Otis (February 10, 1838 – February 22, 1916) was a U.S. representative from Kansas.

== Biography ==
Coat of Arms of John G. Otis

Born near Danby, Vermont, he was a descendant of the Otis family counted among the Boston Brahmin families. He pursued an academic course at Burr Seminary in Manchester, Vermont. He attended Williams College, Williamstown, Massachusetts, and the law department of Harvard University. He was admitted to the bar of Rutland County, Vermont in 1859. He moved to Topeka, Kansas, in May 1859 and commenced the practice of law. He assisted in the recruitment of the first black regiment of Kansas in 1862. He was paymaster general of the Governor's military staff from February 1863 to 1865, with rank of colonel. He engaged in agricultural pursuits and in the dairy business near Topeka. He was State agent of the Grange from 1873 to 1875. He was state lecturer for the Grange from 1889 to 1891.

Otis was elected as a Populist to the 52nd United States Congress (March 4, 1891 – March 3, 1893). He was an unsuccessful candidate for renomination in 1892. He then engaged in his former business pursuits until his death in Topeka on February 22, 1916. He was interred in Topeka Cemetery.

U.S. House of Representatives
Preceded by Harrison Kelley	Member of the U.S. House of Representatives from Kansas's 4th congressional district March 4, 1891 - March 3, 1893	Succeeded by Charles Curtis
