= 2000 United States House of Representatives elections in Kansas =

- November 7, 2000

All 4 Kansas seats to the United States House of Representatives
	Majority party	Minority party	Third party
Party	Republican	Democratic	Libertarian
Last election	3	1	0
Seats won	3	1	0
Seat change	Steady	Steady	Steady
Popular vote	657,978	328,194	52,207
Percentage	63.37%	31.61%	5.03%
Swing	▲1.51%	▼5.82%	▲5.03%

Republican
50–60%
60–70%
70–80%
80–90%
>90%
Democratic
50–60%
60–70%
No Data

The 2000 United States House of Representatives elections in Kansas were held on November 7, 2000, to determine who would represent the state of Kansas in the United States House of Representatives. Kansas has four seats in the House, apportioned according to the 1990 United States census. Representatives are elected for two-year terms.

== Overview ==
United States House of Representatives elections in Kansas, 2000
Party	Votes	Percentage	Seats	+/–
Republican	657,978	63.37%	3	-
Democratic	328,194	31.61%	1	-
Libertarian	52,207	5.03%	0	-
Totals	1,038,379	100.00%	4	-

== District 1 ==
2000 Kansas's 1st congressional district election

Nominee	Jerry Moran	Jack Warner
Party	Republican	Libertarian
Popular vote	216,484	25,843
Percentage	89.3%	10.7%
U.S. Representative before election
Jerry Moran
Republican
Elected U.S. Representative
Jerry Moran
Republican

2000 Kansas's 1st congressional district election
Party	Candidate	Votes	%
Republican	Jerry Moran (incumbent)	216,484	89.34%
Libertarian	Jack Warner	25,843	10.66%
Total votes		242,327	100.00%

== District 2 ==
2000 Kansas's 2nd congressional district election
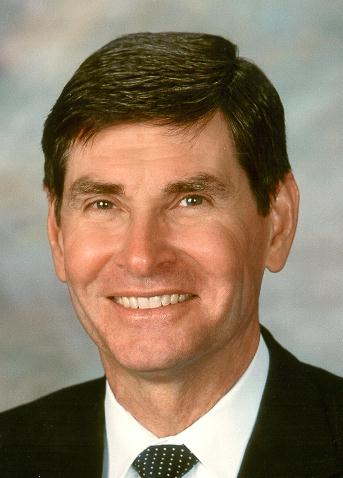

Nominee	Jim Ryun	Stanley Wiles
Party	Republican	Democratic
Popular vote	164,951	71,709
Percentage	67.4%	29.3%
U.S. Representative before election
Jim Ryun
Republican
Elected U.S. Representative
Jim Ryun
Republican

2000 Kansas's 2nd congressional district election
Party	Candidate	Votes	%
Republican	Jim Ryun (incumbent)	164,951	67.39%
Democratic	Stanley Wiles	71,709	29.30%
Libertarian	Dennis Hawver	8,099	3.31%
Total votes		244,759	100.00%

== District 3 ==
2000 Kansas's 3rd congressional district election

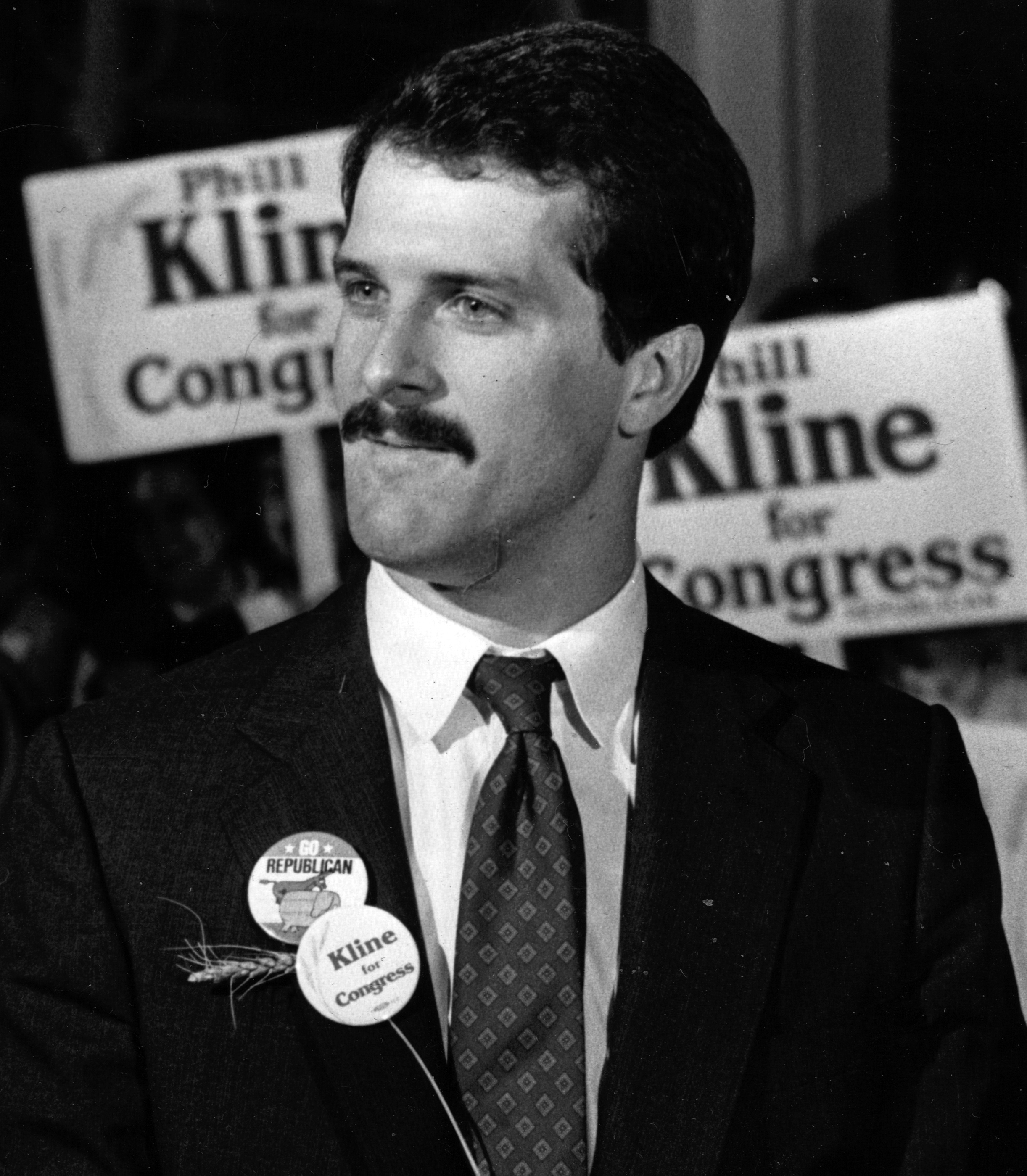
Nominee	Dennis Moore	Phill Kline
Party	Democratic	Republican
Popular vote	154,505	144,672
Percentage	50.0%	46.9%
U.S. Representative before election
Dennis Moore
Democratic
Elected U.S. Representative
Dennis Moore
Democratic

2000 Kansas's 3rd congressional district election
Party	Candidate	Votes	%
Democratic	Dennis Moore (incumbent)	154,505	50.05%
Republican	Phill Kline	144,672	46.86%
Libertarian	Chris Mina	9,533	3.09%
Total votes		308,710	100.00%

== District 4 ==
2000 Kansas's 4th congressional district election
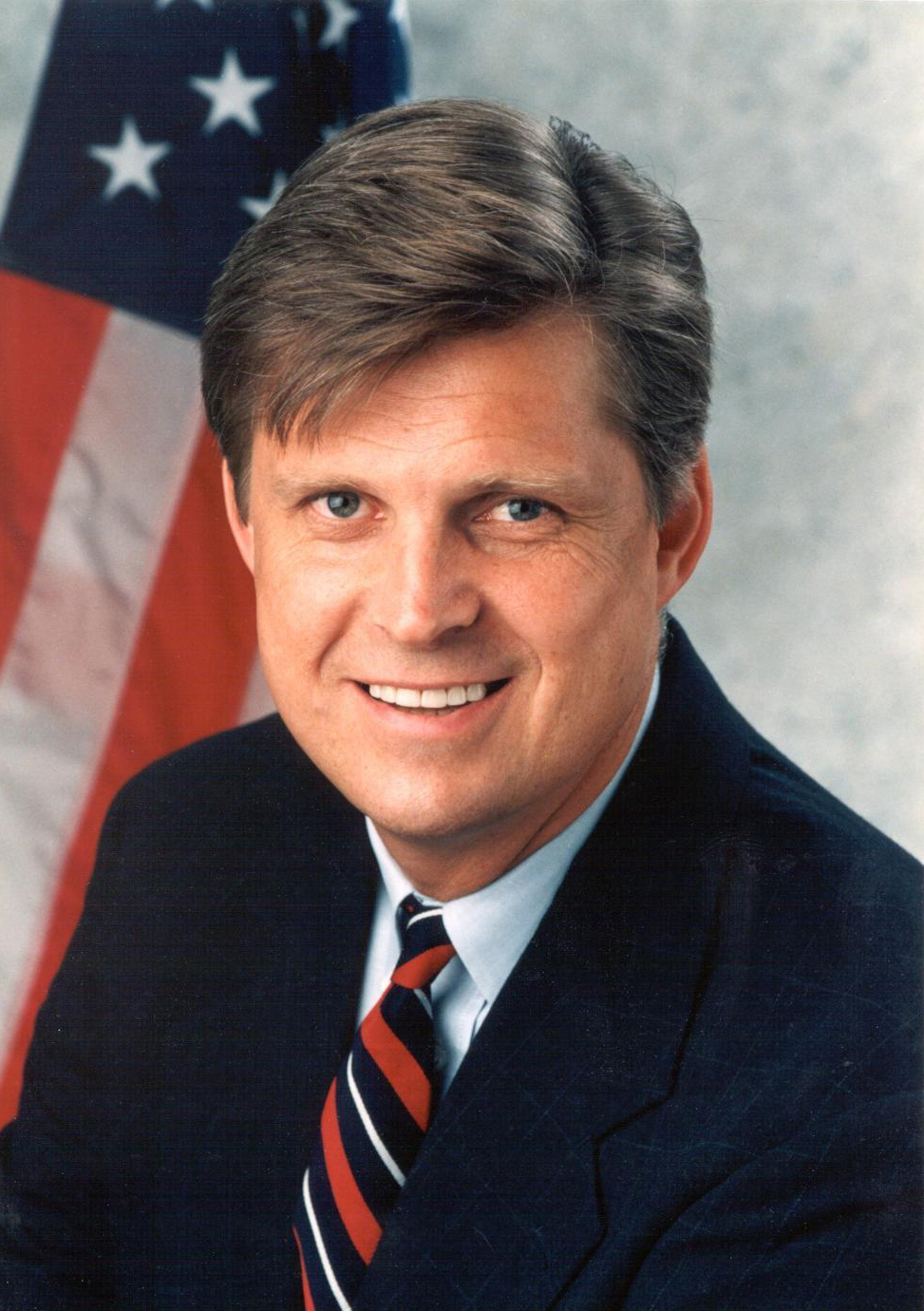

Nominee	Todd Tiahrt	Carlos Nolla
Party	Republican	Democratic
Popular vote	131,871	101,980
Percentage	54.4%	42.0%
U.S. Representative before election
Todd Tiahrt
Republican
Elected U.S. Representative
Todd Tiahrt
Republican

2000 Kansas's 4th congressional district election
Party	Candidate	Votes	%
Republican	Todd Tiahrt (incumbent)	131,871	54.36%
Democratic	Carlos Nolla	101,980	42.04%
Libertarian	Steven A. Rosile	8,732	3.60%
Total votes		242,583	100.00%
