= Harrison Kelley =

American politician

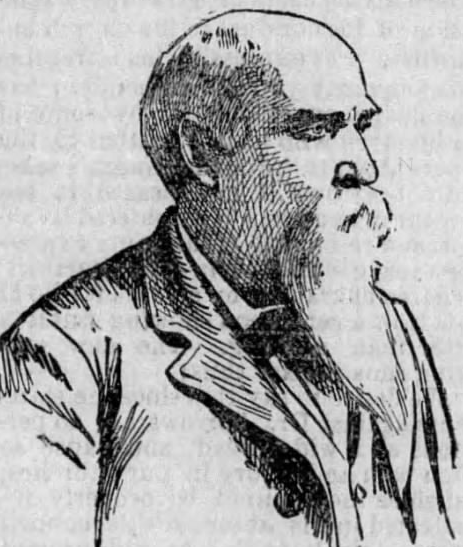
- Los Angeles Evening Express, October 11, 1890

Member of the U.S. House of Representatives from Kansas's 4th district
- In office December 2, 1889 – March 3, 1891
- Preceded by: Thomas Ryan
- Succeeded by: John G. Otis

Personal details
- Born: May 12, 1836 Montgomery Township, Ohio, US
- Died: July 24, 1897 (aged 61) Burlington, Kansas, US
- Party: Republican

Military service
- Allegiance: United States of America
- Branch/service: Union Army
- Years of service: 1942–1946
- Rank: Captain
- Unit: Company B, 5th Cavalry; 5th Regiment, Kansas Volunteer Cavalry
- Battles/wars: Civil War

Harrison Kelley (May 12, 1836 – July 24, 1897) was a U.S. representative from Kansas.

Born William Henry Harrison Kelley in Montgomery Township, Ohio, Kelley attended the common schools. He moved to Coffey County, Kansas, in March 1858. During the Civil War Kelley enlisted in the Fifth Regiment, Kansas Volunteer Cavalry, and served through all grades to captain. He served as captain of Company B, Fifth Cavalry, for over two years. He returned to Burlington, Kansas, in 1865. Brigadier general of Kansas State Militia in 1865. He served as a member of the State house of representatives 1868–1870. He served as director of the State penitentiary 1868–1873. Receiver of the United States land office at Topeka in 1877 and 1878. He served in the State senate 1880–1884. Deputy collector of internal revenue. He served as chairman of the livestock sanitary commission of the State. Treasurer of the State board of charities in 1889.

Kelley was elected as a Republican to the Fifty-first Congress to fill the vacancy caused by the resignation of Thomas Ryan and served from December 2, 1889, to March 3, 1891. He died in Burlington, Kansas on July 24, 1897. He was interred in Bowman Cemetery, Ottumwa, near Burlington, Kansas.

U.S. House of Representatives
Preceded by Thomas Ryan	Member of the U.S. House of Representatives from Kansas's 4th congressional district December 2, 1889 - March 3, 1891	Succeeded by John G. Otis
