= William Ripley Brown =

American politician

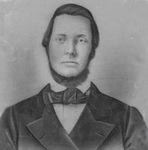

Member of the U.S. House of Representatives from Kansas's 3rd district
- In office March 4, 1875 – March 3, 1877
- Preceded by: District created
- Succeeded by: Thomas Ryan

Personal details
- Born: July 16, 1840 Buffalo, New York
- Died: March 3, 1916 (aged 75) Kansas City, Missouri
- Party: Republican

William Ripley Brown (July 16, 1840 – March 3, 1916) was a U.S. representative from Kansas.

Born in Buffalo, New York to Mary (Ripley) and John Stillman Brown, a teacher and Unitarian minister and later Kansas resident, William Ripley Brown studied at Phillips Exeter Academy, Exeter, New Hampshire, as his father had done. Like his father again, William went on to attend and graduate Phi Beta Kappa, from Union College, Schenectady, New York, in 1862. He went immediately to Kansas and settled in Emporia. He studied law. He was admitted to the bar in 1864 and commenced practice in Emporia. He was a judge of the ninth judicial district of Kansas in 1867-1877.

Brown was elected as a Republican to the Forty-fourth Congress (March 4, 1875 – March 3, 1877). He was an unsuccessful candidate for renomination in 1876. He resumed the practice of law in Hutchinson, Kansas. He was the register of the United States land office in Larned, Kansas, from 1883 to 1885. He moved to El Reno, Oklahoma, in 1892 and was a probate judge of Canadian County in 1894-1898. He died in Kansas City, Missouri, on March 3, 1916, and was interred in Lawrence Cemetery in Lawrence, Kansas.

U.S. House of Representatives
Preceded by District created	Member of the U.S. House of Representatives from Kansas's 3rd congressional district March 4, 1875 – March 3, 1877	Succeeded by Thomas Ryan
