= Kansas's congressional districts =

U.S. House districts in the State of Kansas

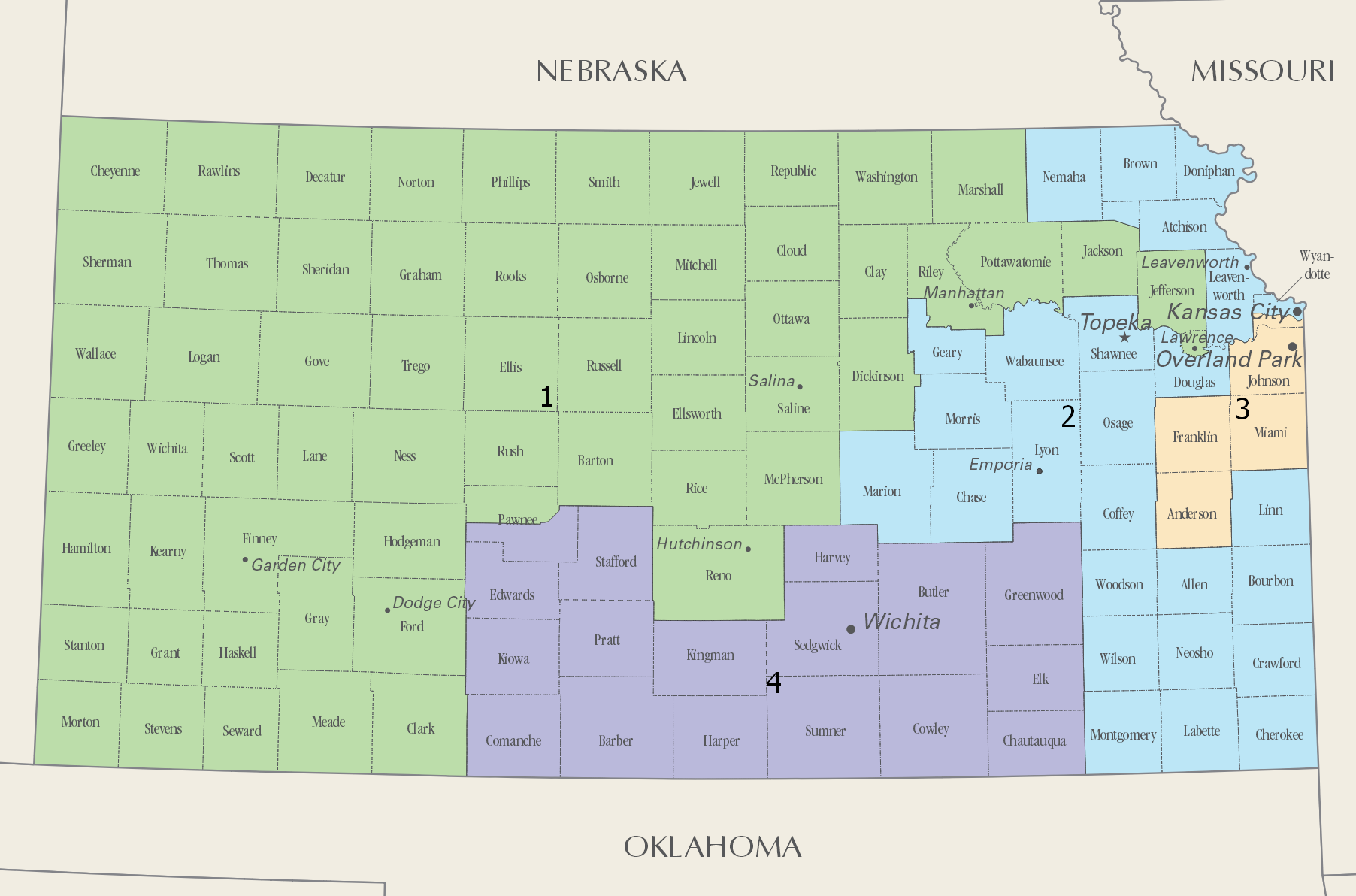
Map of Kansas's congressional districts since 2023 Interactive map version

Kansas is divided into 4 congressional districts, each represented by a member of the United States House of Representatives. The number of districts in Kansas remained unchanged after the 2010 census. Historically, the state has held as many as eight seats (1893–1933). The number of congressional seats decreased from five to four following the 1990 census. Between 1990 and 2000, the population of Kansas grew by 8.5% from 2,477,574 to 2,688,418, making it the 32nd most populated state; all four congressional seats were retained.

From 2010 to 2018, the state's congressional delegation was composed of all Republicans. However, following the 2018 elections, one incumbent was ousted by a Democratic challenger, changing the state's delegation to a 3-1 Republican majority.

== List of districts and representatives ==
Members of the United States House delegation from Kansas, their terms, their district boundaries, and the district political ratings according to the CPVI. For the 118th Congress, the state's congressional delegation consists of 3 Republicans and 1 Democrat.

U.S. representatives from Kansas
| District | Member (Residence) | Party | Incumbent since | CPVI (2025) | District map |
|---|---|---|---|---|---|
| 1st | Tracey Mann (Salina) | Republican | January 3, 2021 | R+16 | |
| 2nd | Derek Schmidt (Independence) | Republican | January 3, 2025 | R+10 | |
| 3rd | Sharice Davids (Roeland Park) | Democratic | January 3, 2019 | D+2 | |
| 4th | Ron Estes (Wichita) | Republican | April 25, 2017 | R+12 | |

== Historical results ==
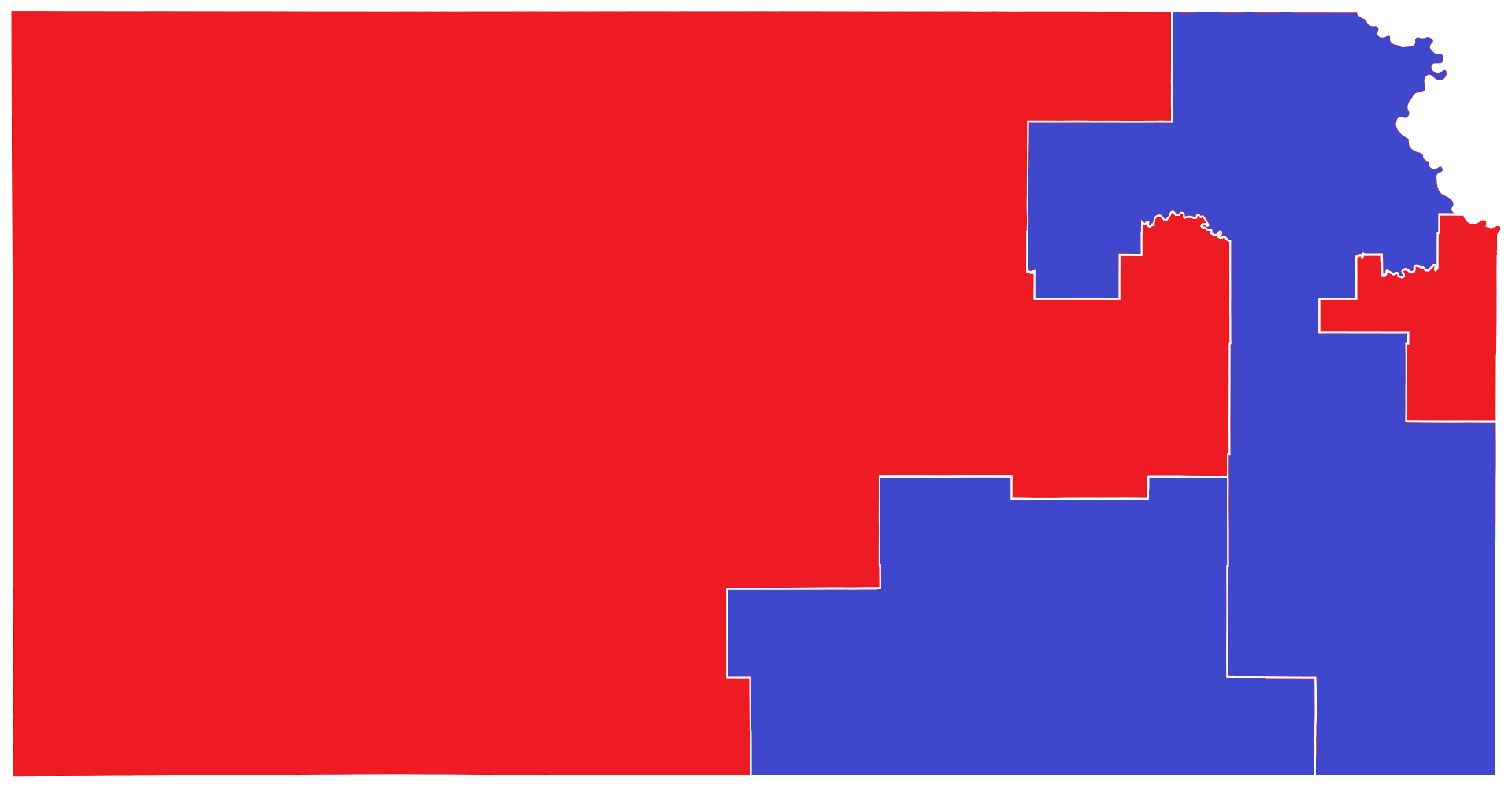
1992

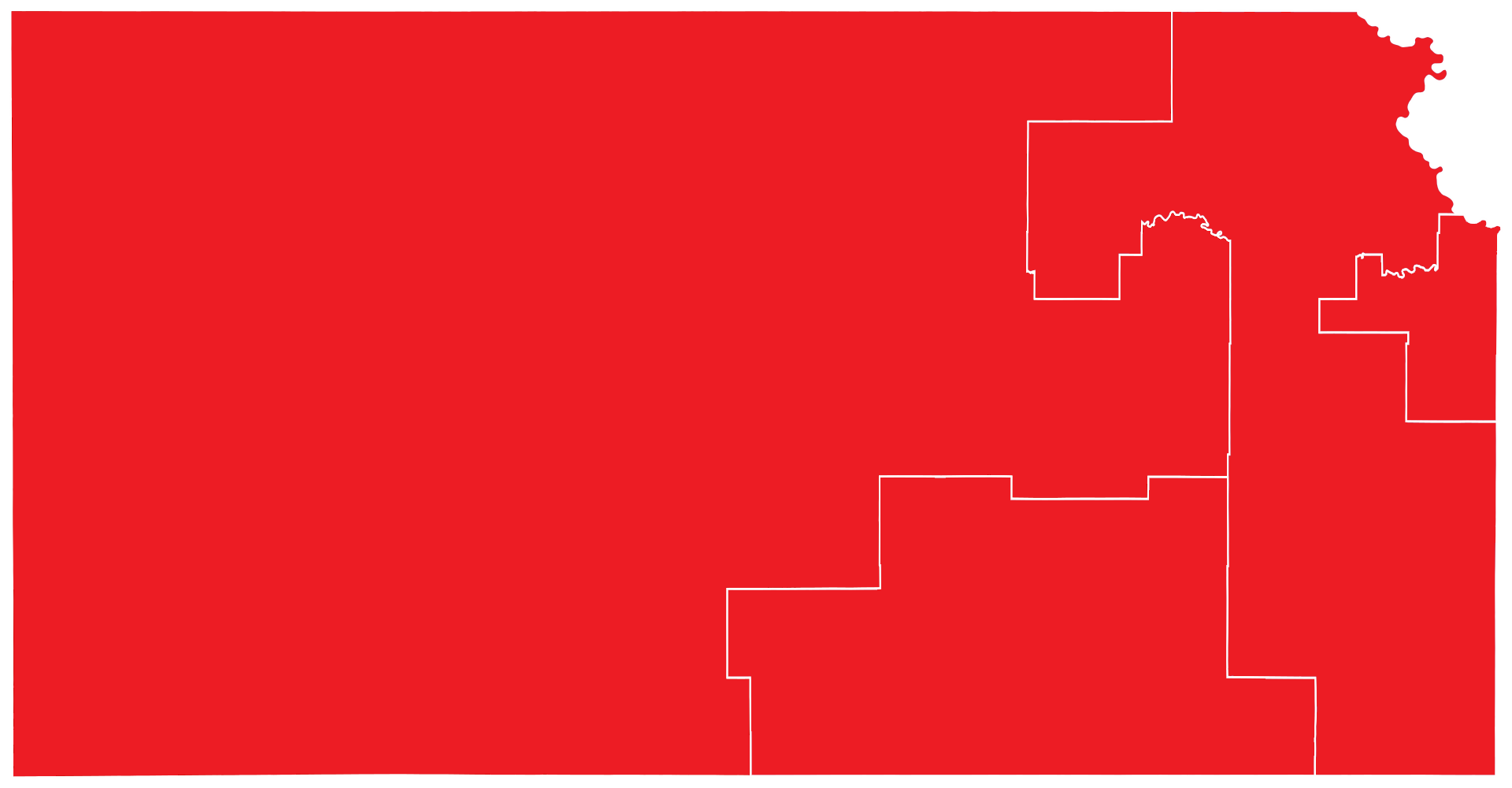
1994

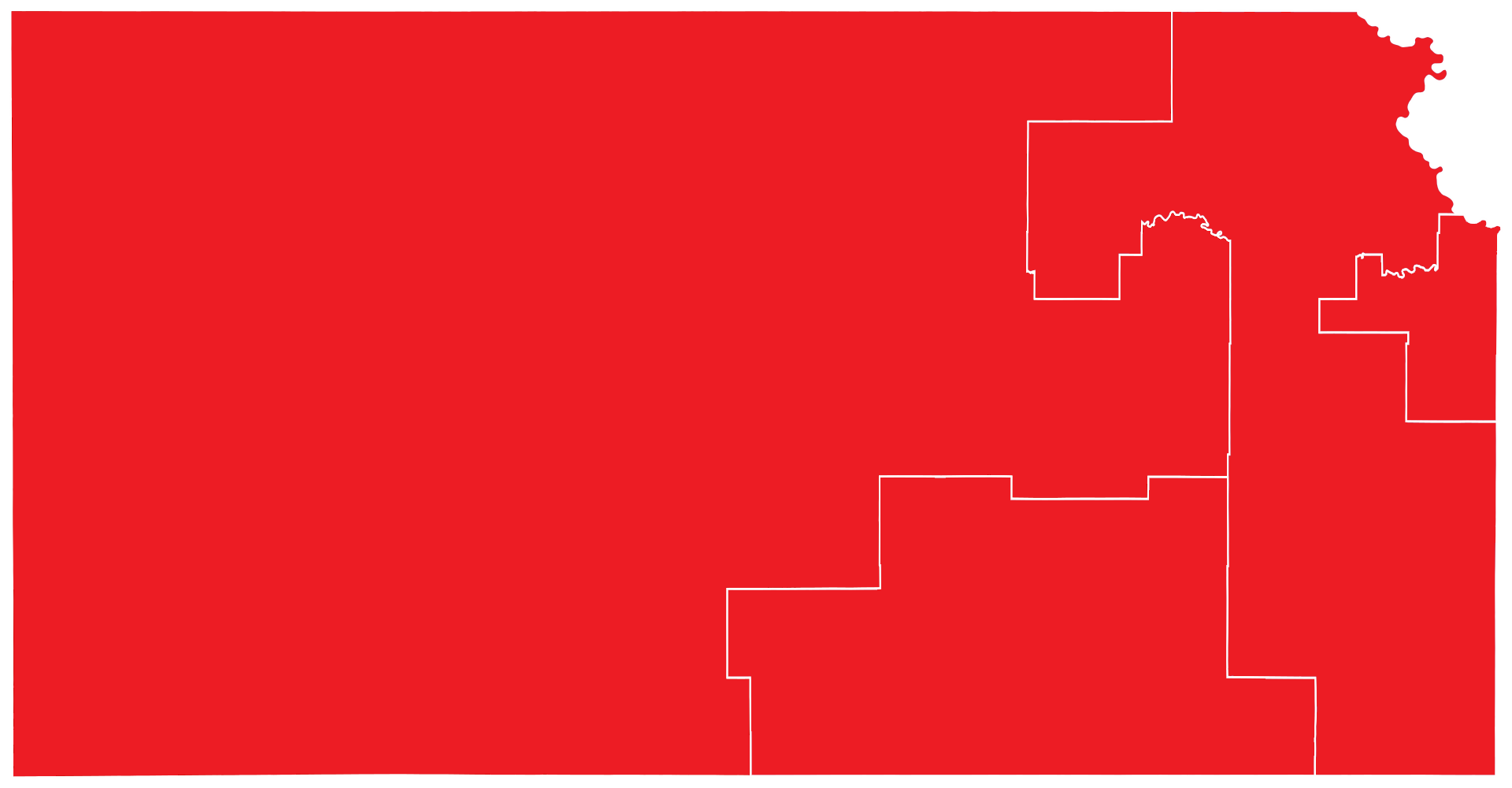
1996

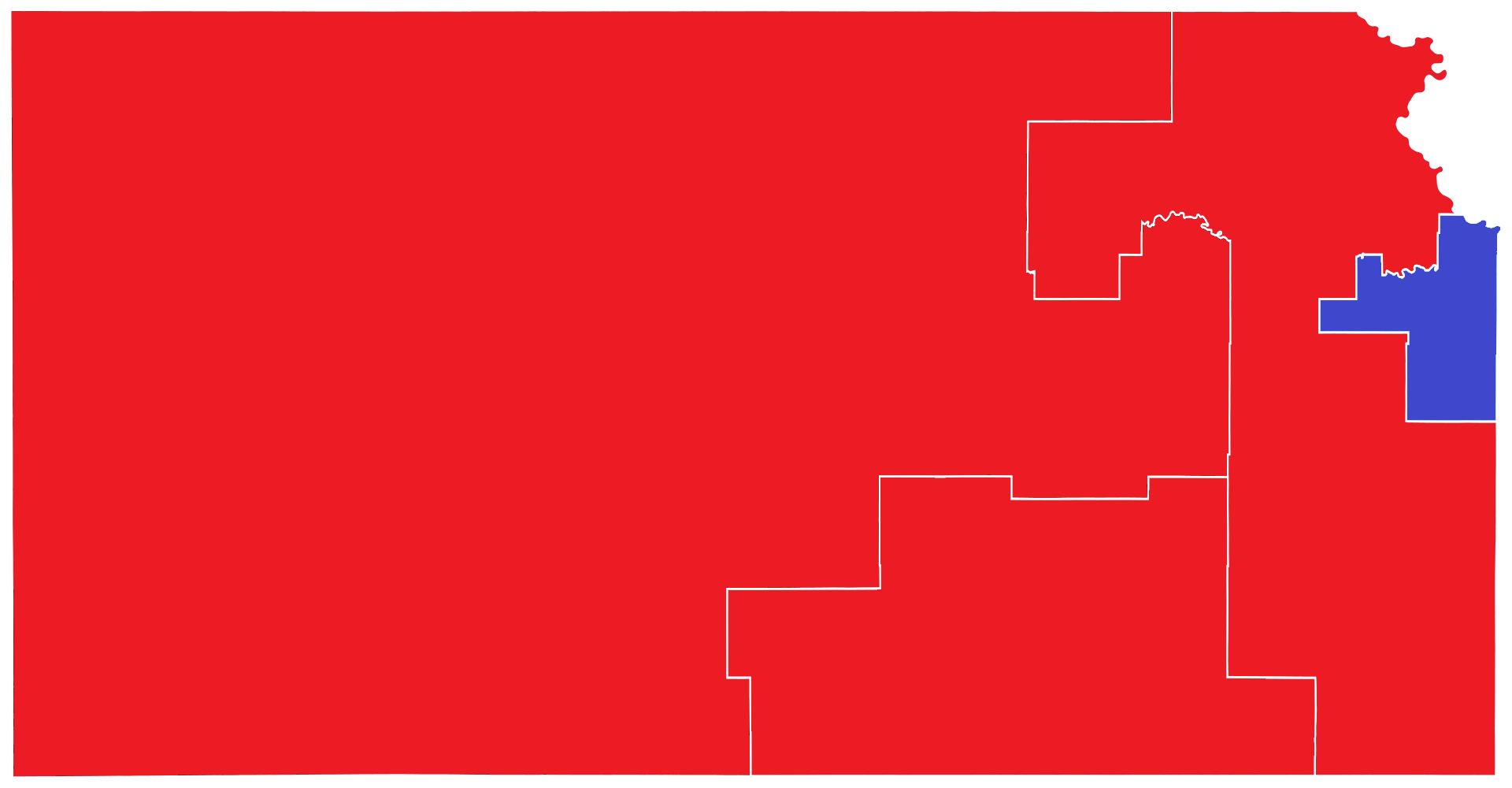
1998

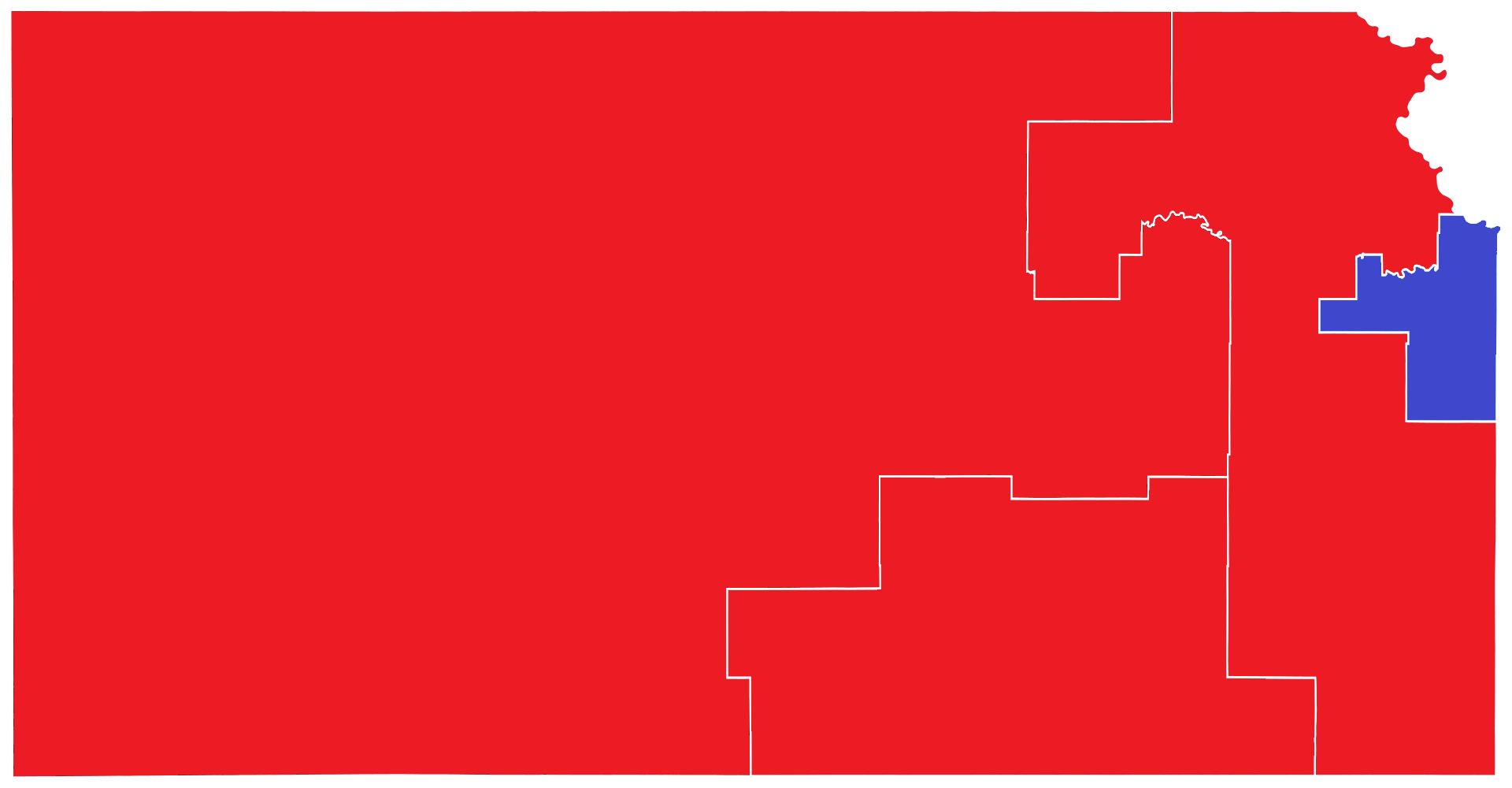
2000

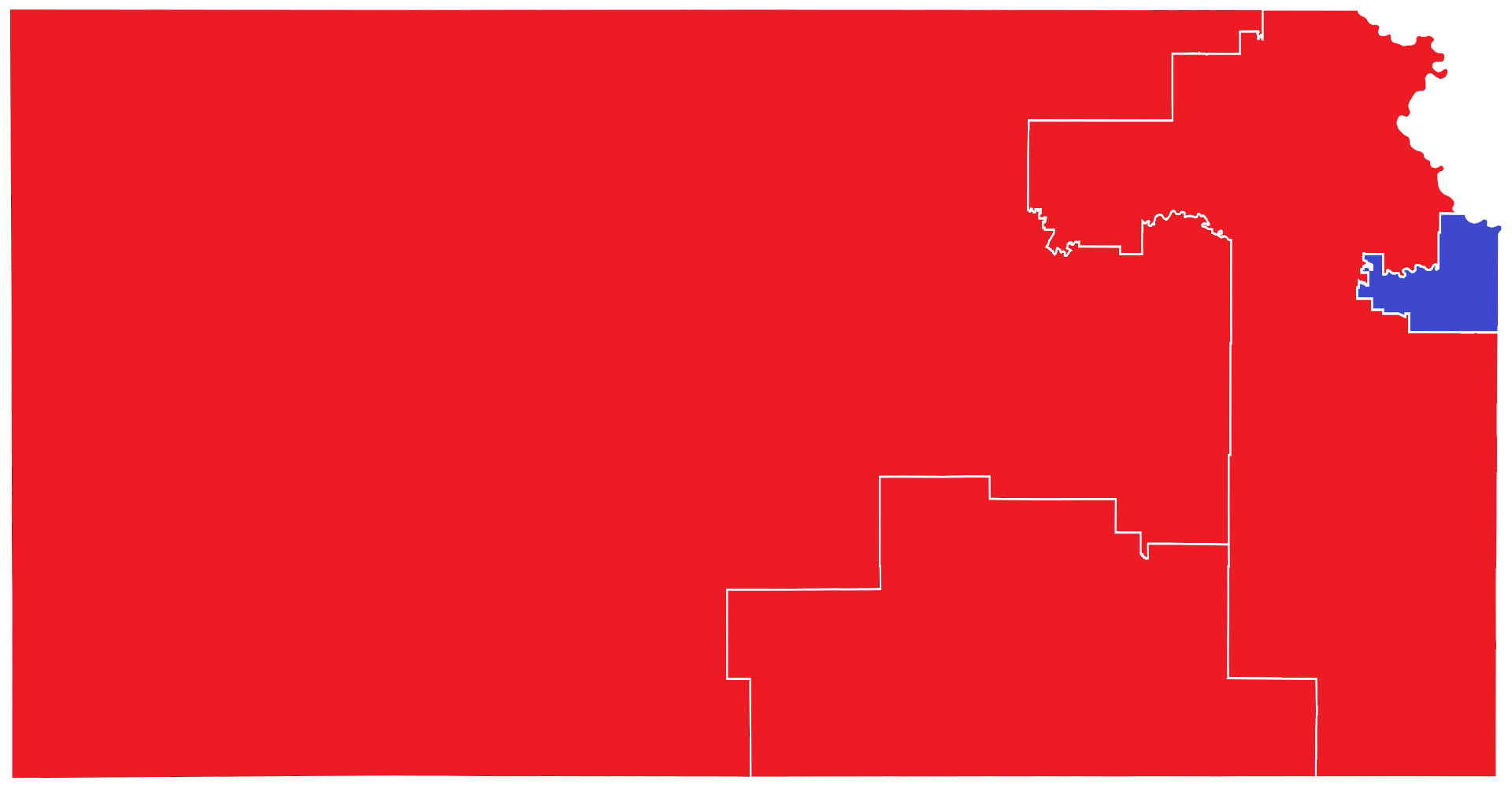
2002

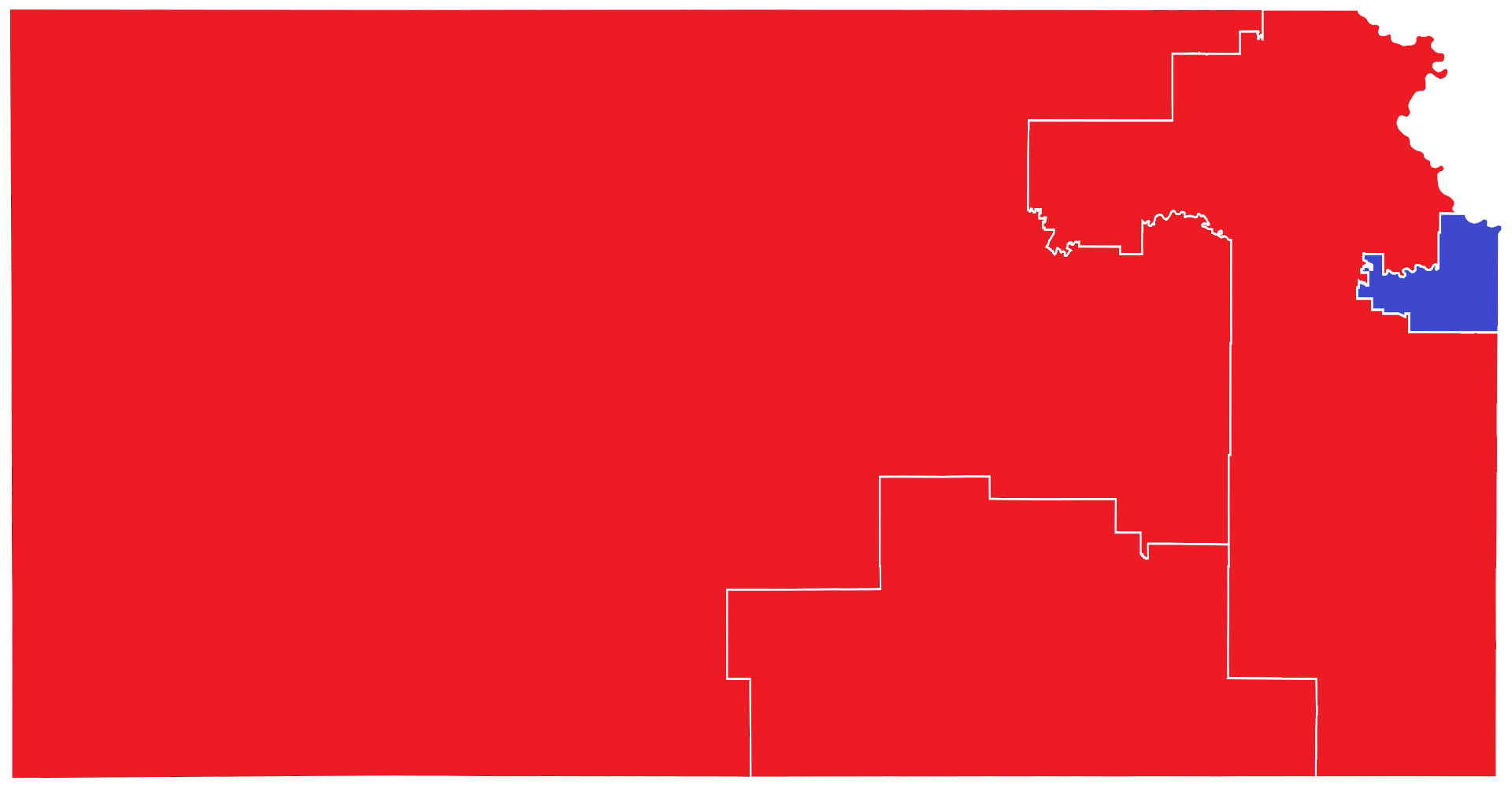
2004

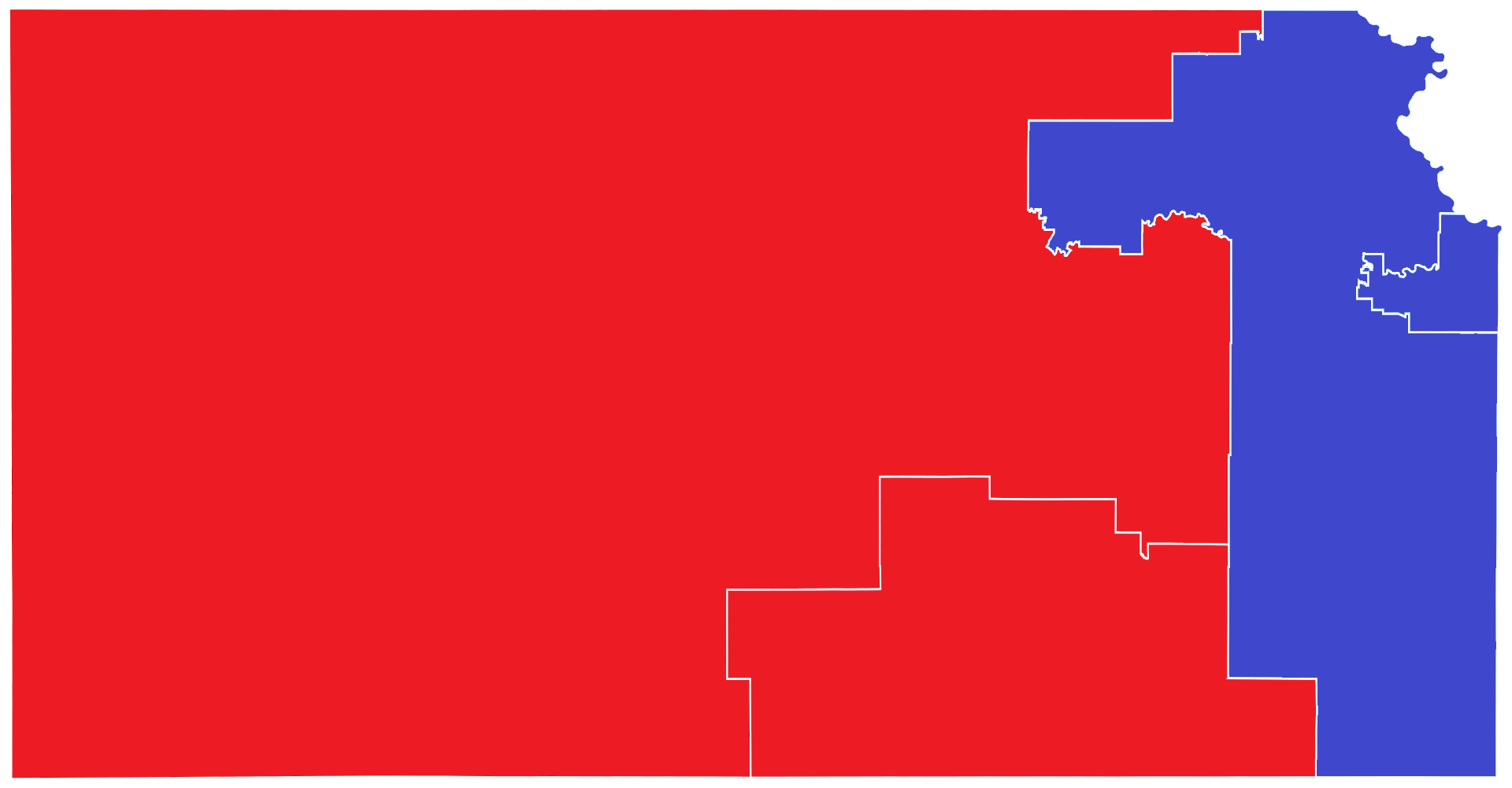
2006

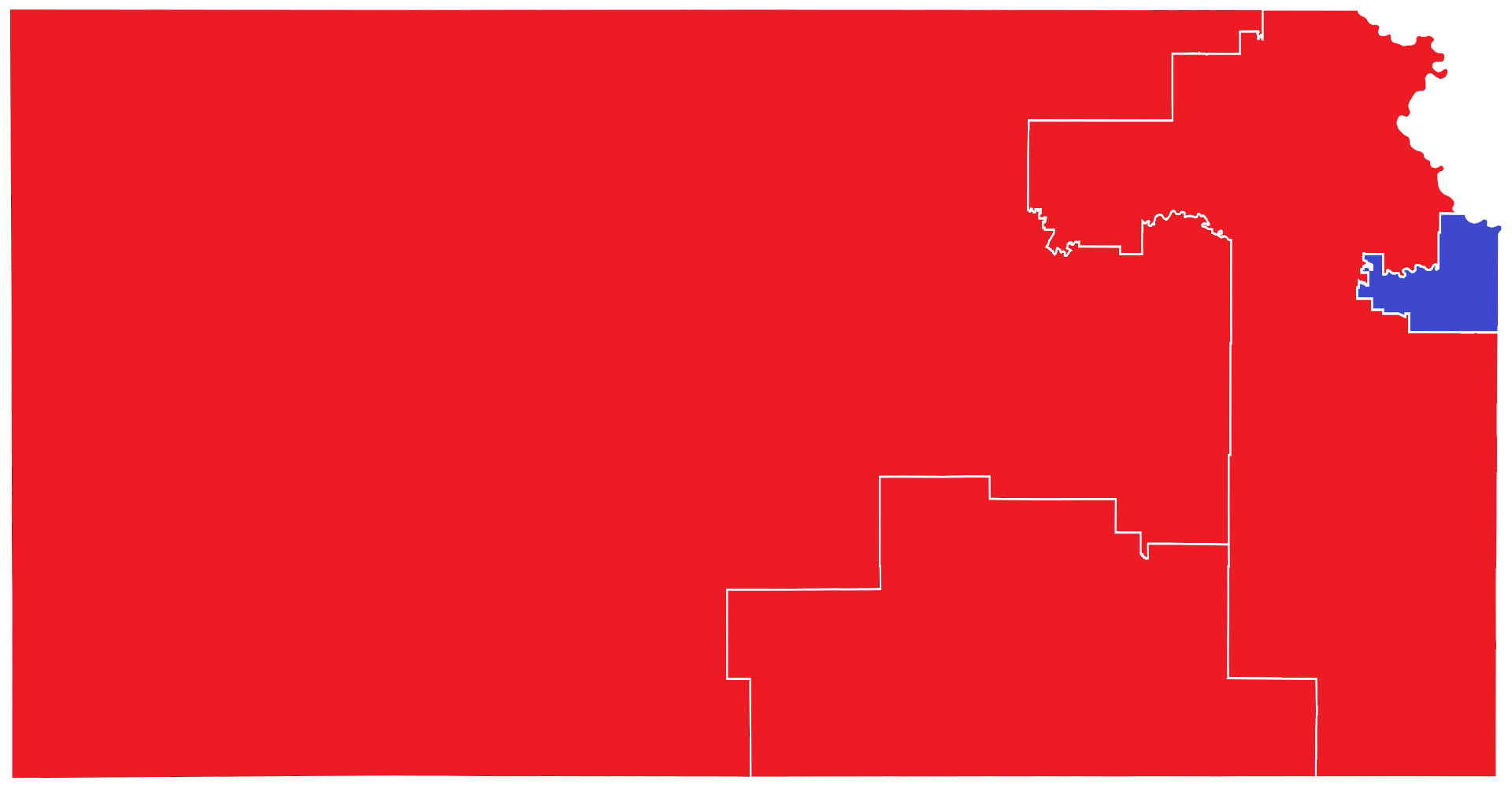
2008

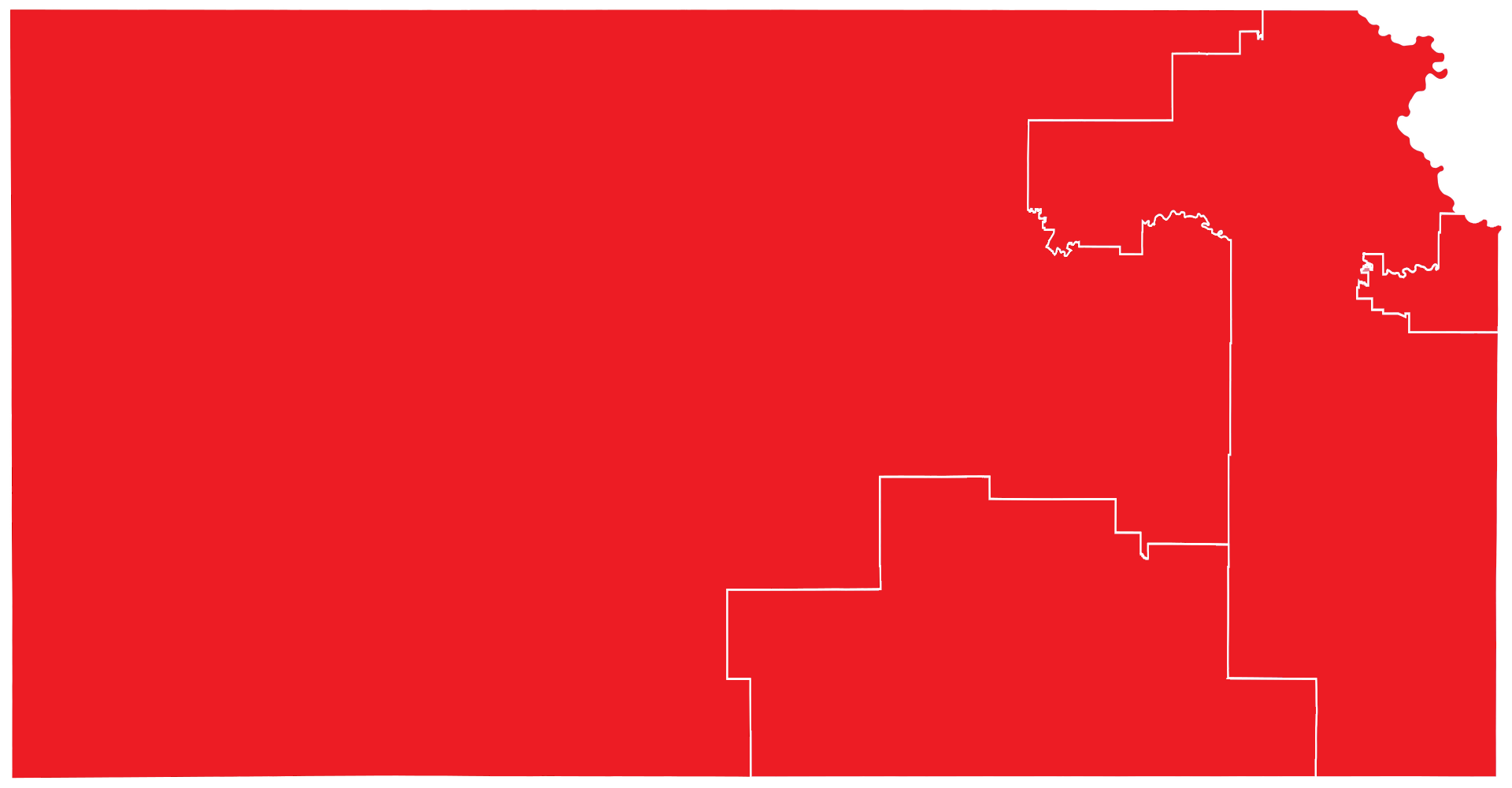
2010

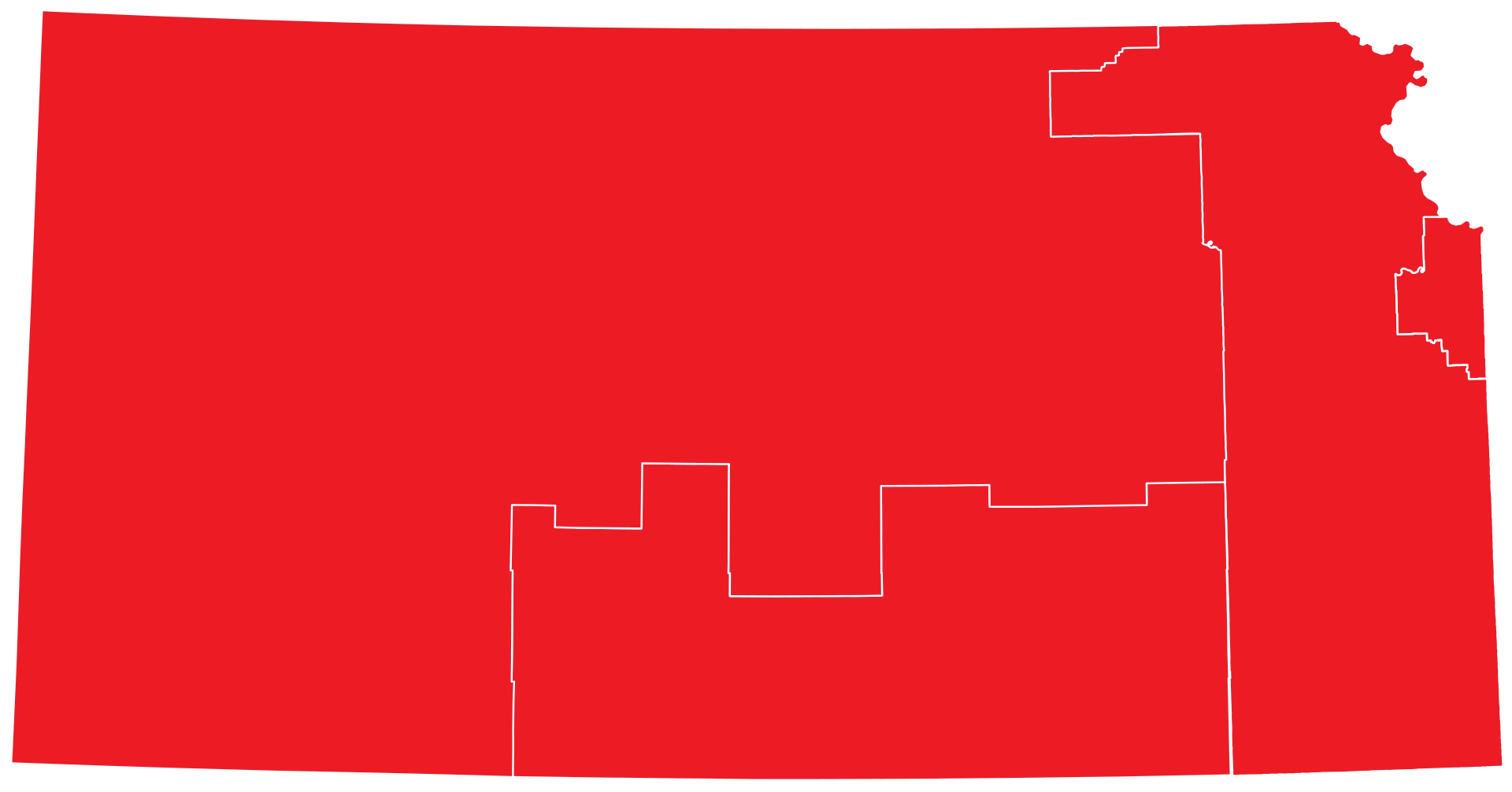
2012

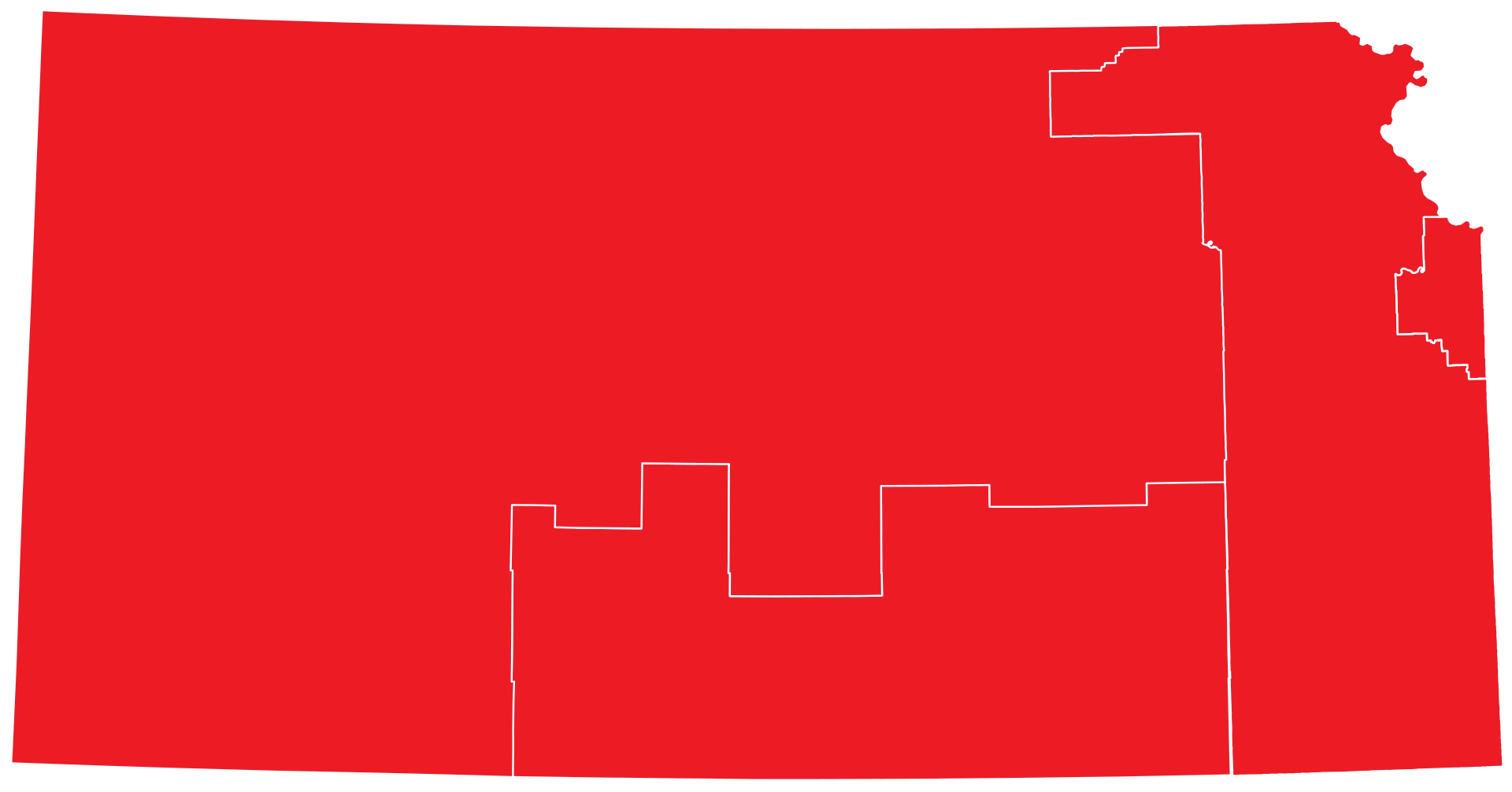
2014

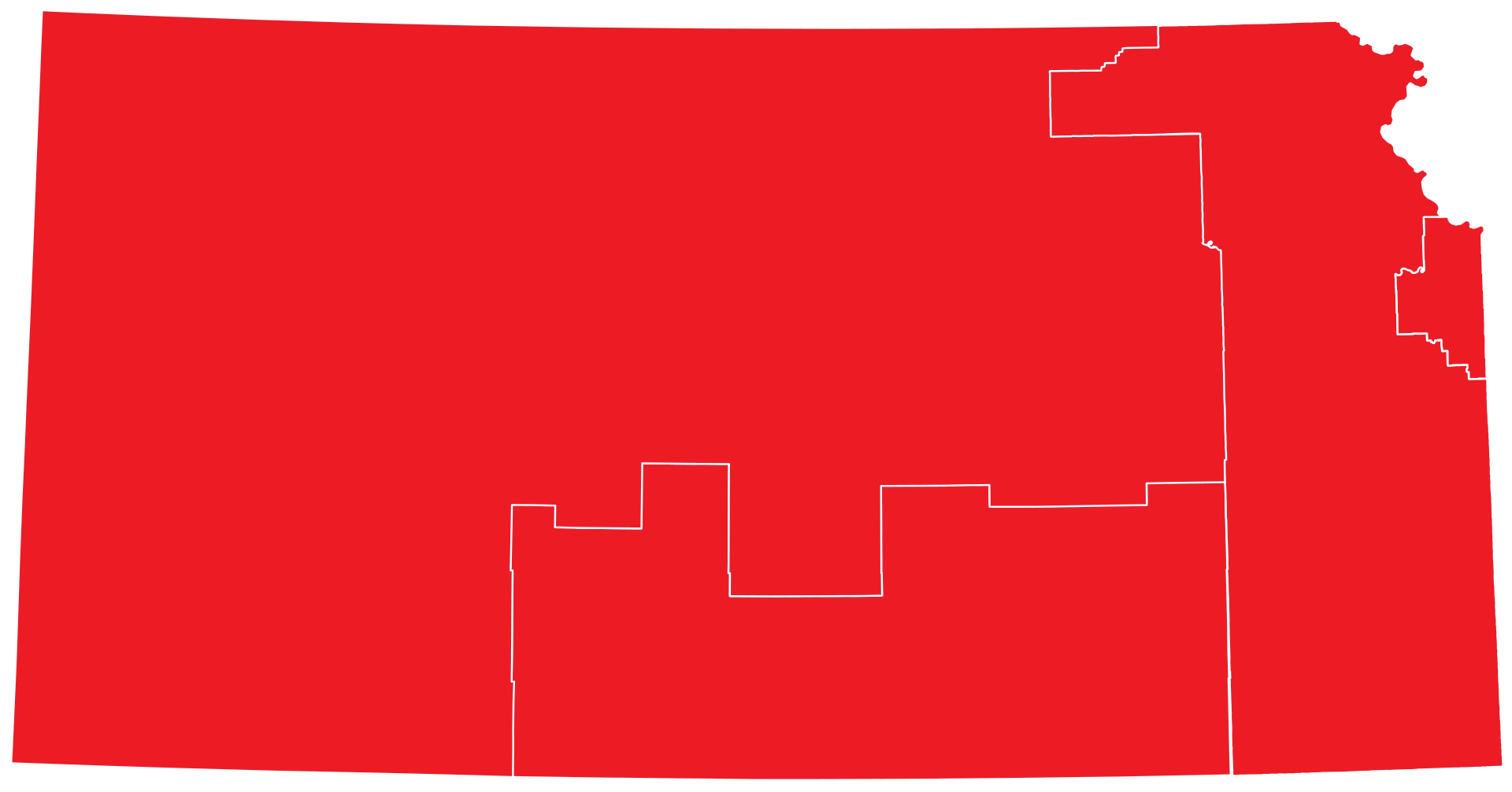
2016

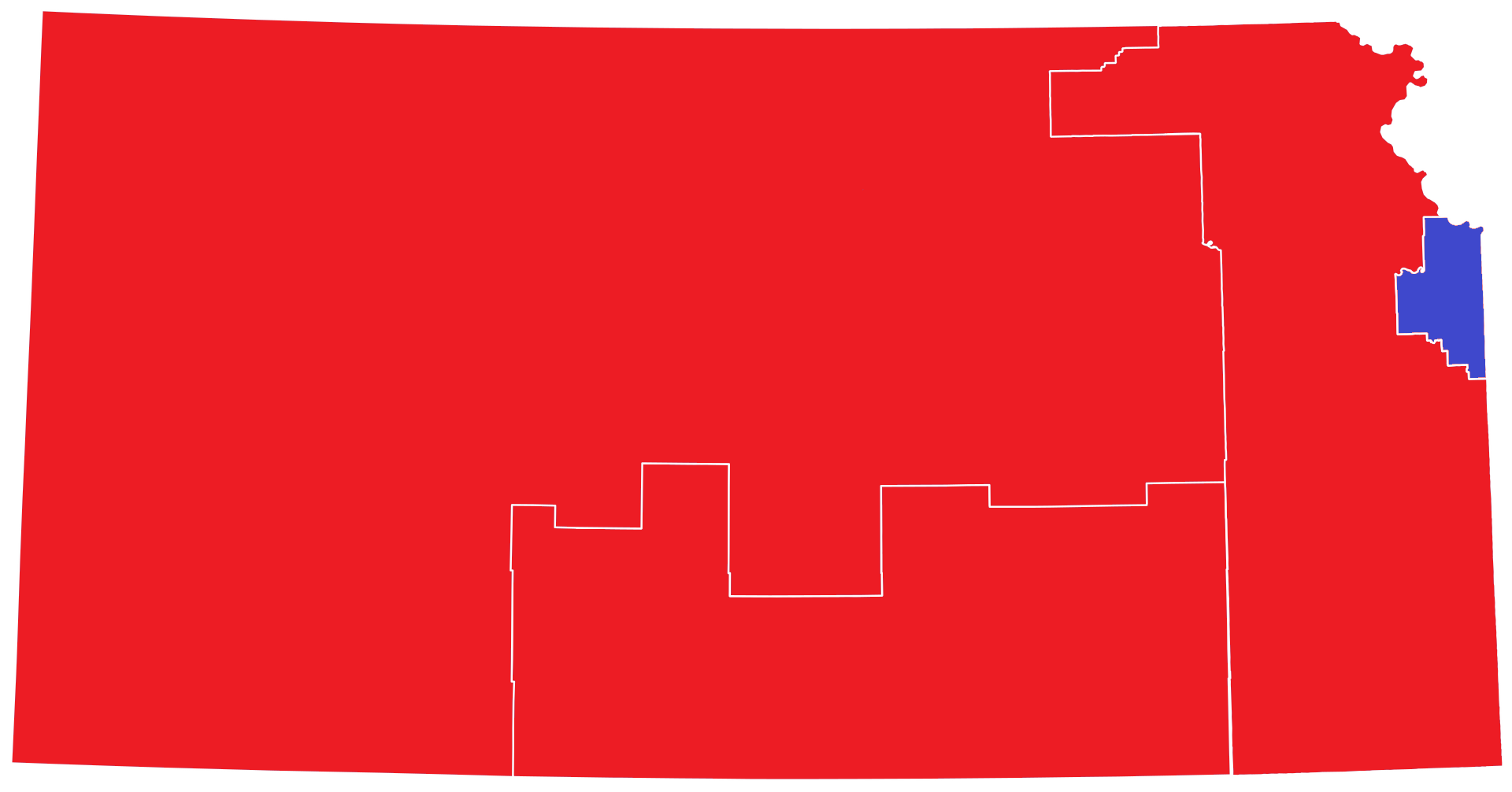
2018

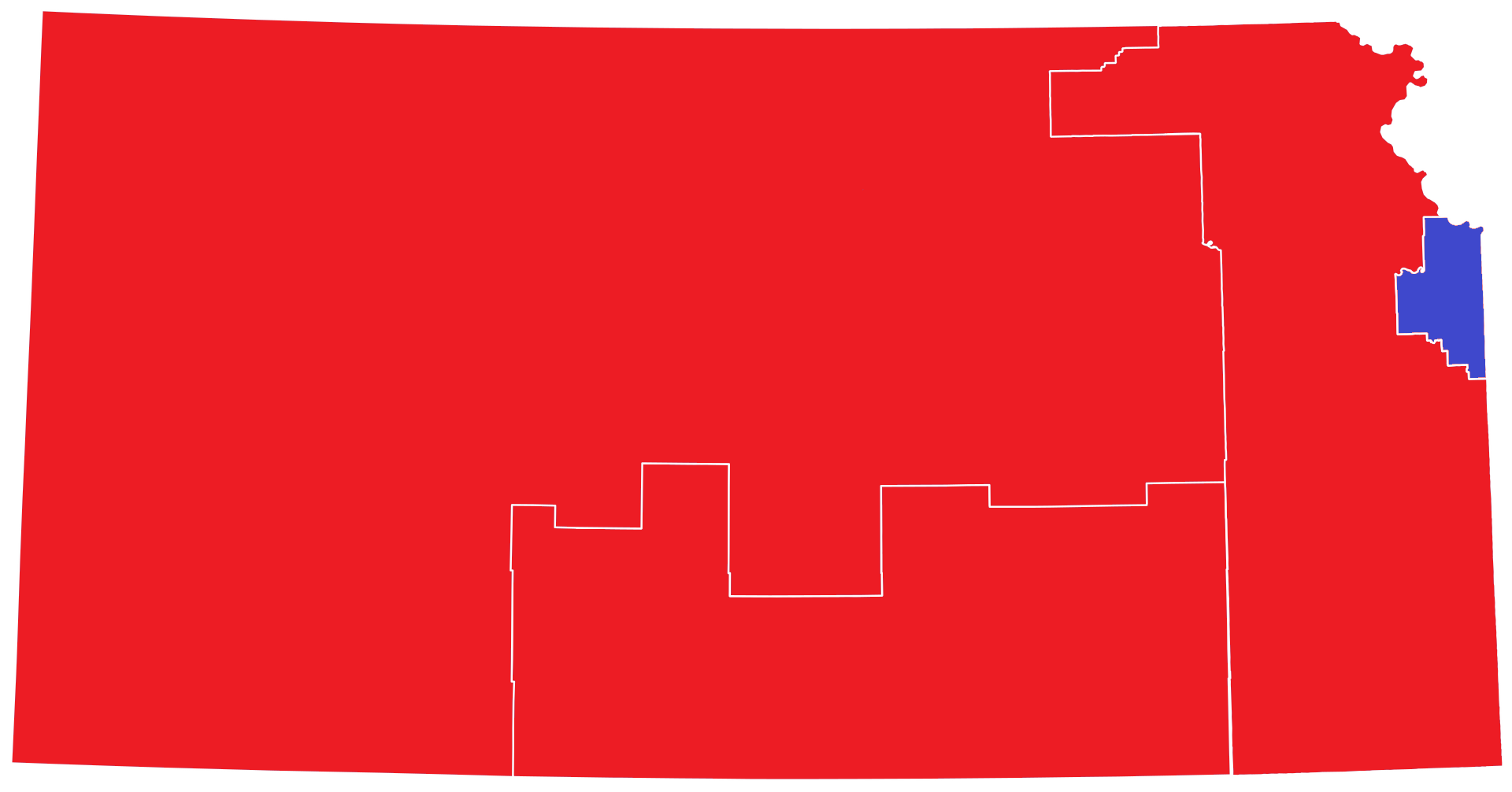
2020

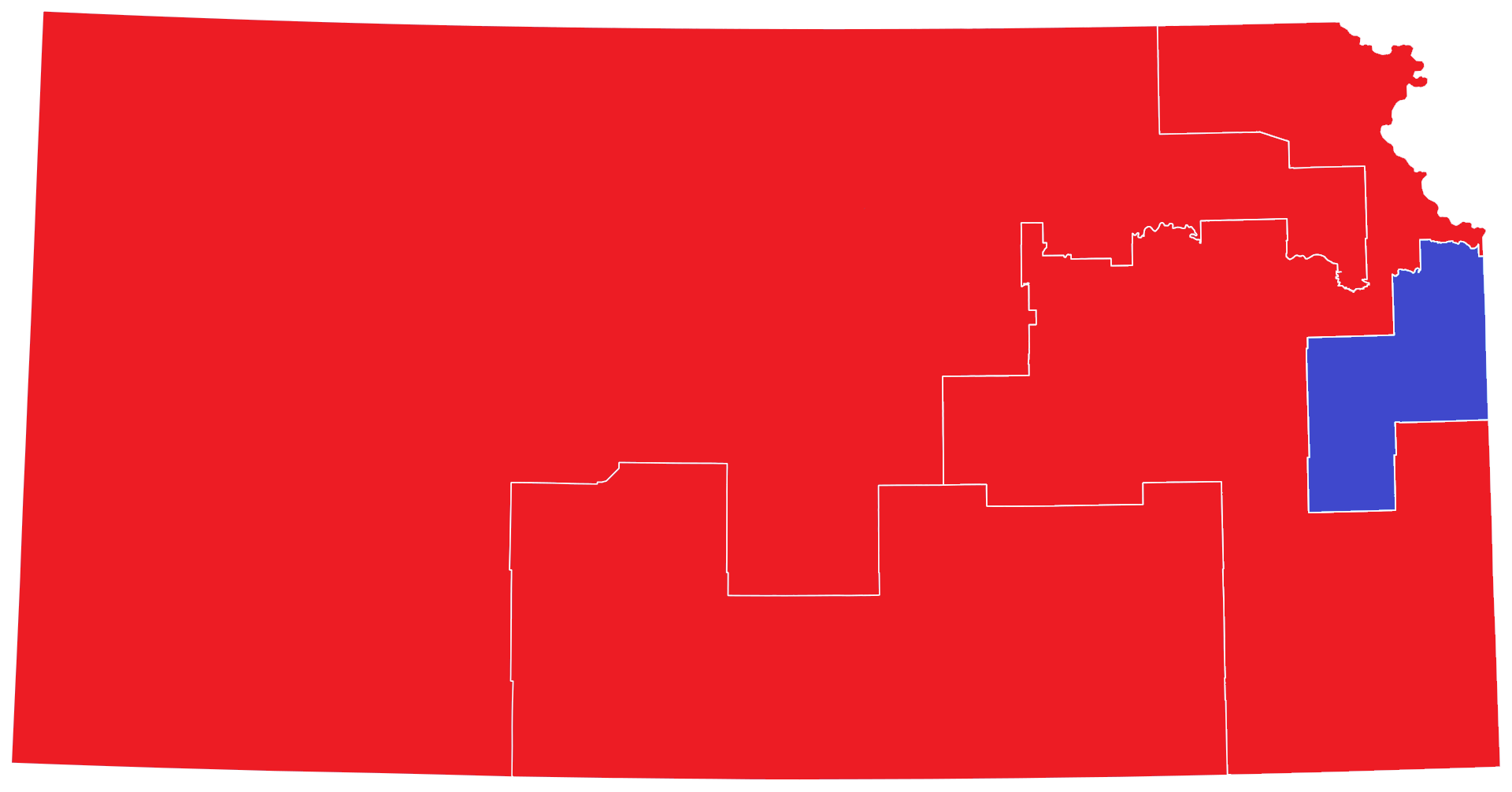
2022

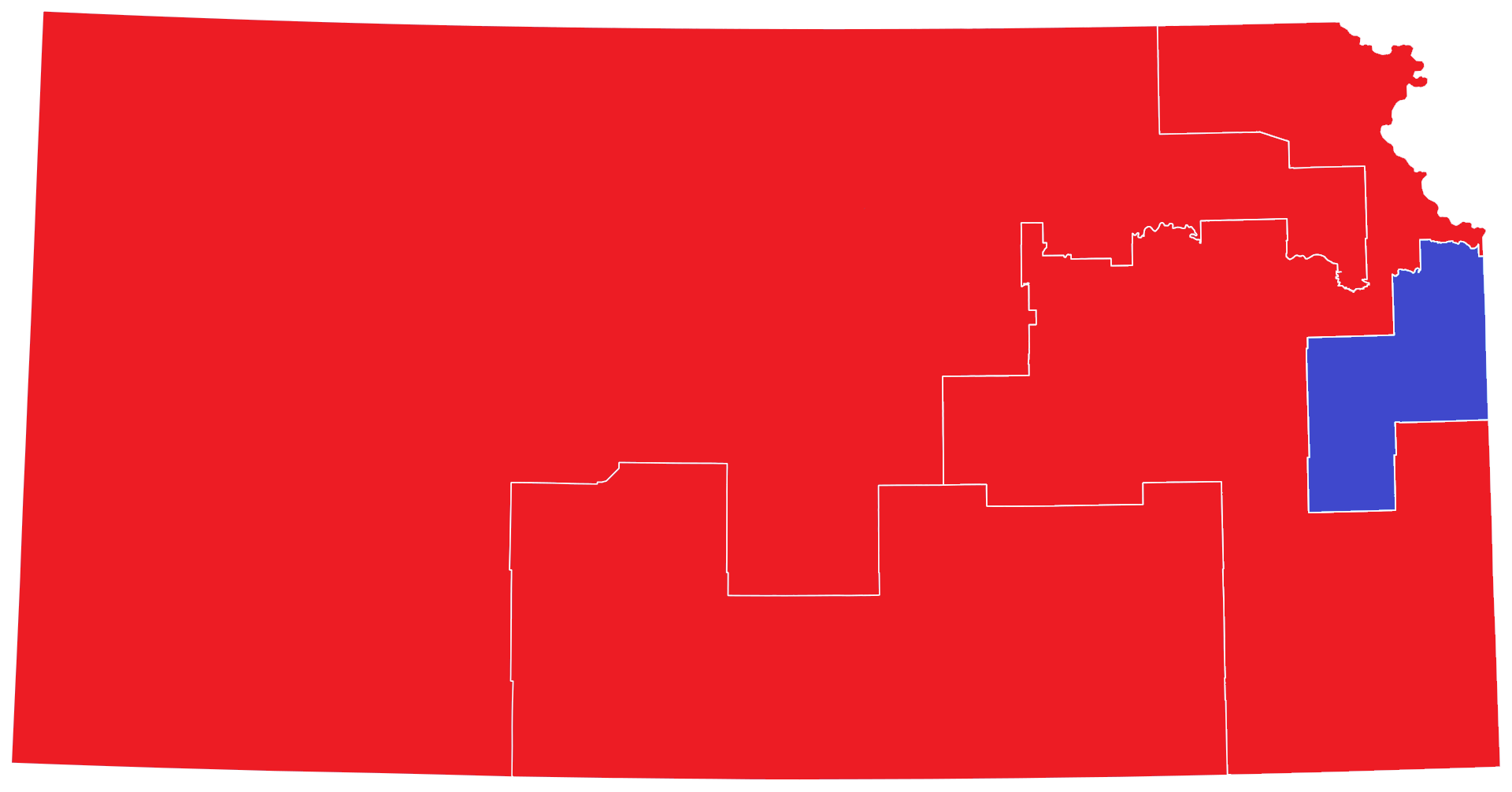
2024

== History of district boundaries ==
Table of United States congressional district boundary maps in the State of Kansas, presented chronologically. All redistricting events in Kansas between 1973 and 2013 are shown.

| Year | Statewide map |
|---|---|
| 1973–1982 | |
| 1983–1992 | |
| 1993–2002 | |
| 2003–2013 | |
| 2013–2023 | |

== Obsolete districts ==
- Kansas Territory's at-large congressional district
- Kansas's at-large congressional district
- Kansas's 5th congressional district
- Kansas's 6th congressional district
- Kansas's 7th congressional district
- Kansas's 8th congressional district

== See also ==
- List of United States congressional districts
- United States congressional apportionment
