= Wolgast (surname) =

Wolgast is a surname. Notable people with the surname include:

- Ad Wolgast (1888–1955), American boxer
- Elizabeth Wolgast (1929–2020), American philosopher
- Larry Wolgast (born 1940), American politician
- Midget Wolgast (1910–1955), American boxer
- Otto Wolgast (c. 1640-1681), early Mennonite and one of the first settlers of Lewes, Delaware.
