= 2020 United States House of Representatives elections in Kansas =

- November 3, 2020

All 4 Kansas seats to the United States House of Representatives
	Majority party	Minority party
Party	Republican	Democratic
Last election	3	1
Seats won	3	1
Seat change	Steady	Steady
Popular vote	775,898	557,258
Percentage	57.10%	41.01%
Swing	▲3.15%	▼2.88%

Republican
50–60%
60–70%
70–80%
80–90%
>90%
Democratic
50–60%
60–70%

The 2020 United States House of Representatives elections in Kansas were held on November 3, 2020, to elect the four U.S. representatives from the state of Kansas, one from each of the state's four congressional districts. The elections coincided with the 2020 U.S. presidential election, as well as other elections to the House of Representatives, elections to the United States Senate, and various state and local elections.

== Overview ==
District	Republican		Democratic		Others		Total		Result
District	Votes	%	Votes	%	Votes	%	Votes	%	Result
District 1	208,229	71.16%	84,393	28.84%	0	0.00%	292,622	100.0%	Republican hold
District 2	185,464	55.15%	136,650	40.63%	14,201	4.22%	336,315	100.0%	Republican hold
District 3	178,773	43.56%	220,049	53.62%	11,596	2.83%	410,418	100.0%	Democratic hold
District 4	203,432	63.65%	116,166	36.35%	0	0.00%	319,598	100.0%	Republican hold
Total	775,898	57.10%	557,258	41.01%	25,797	1.89%	1,358,953	100.0%	

Popular vote
Republican	57.10%
Democratic	41.01%
Other	1.89%

House seats
Republican	75.00%
Democratic	25.00%

== District 1 ==
2020 Kansas's 1st congressional district election
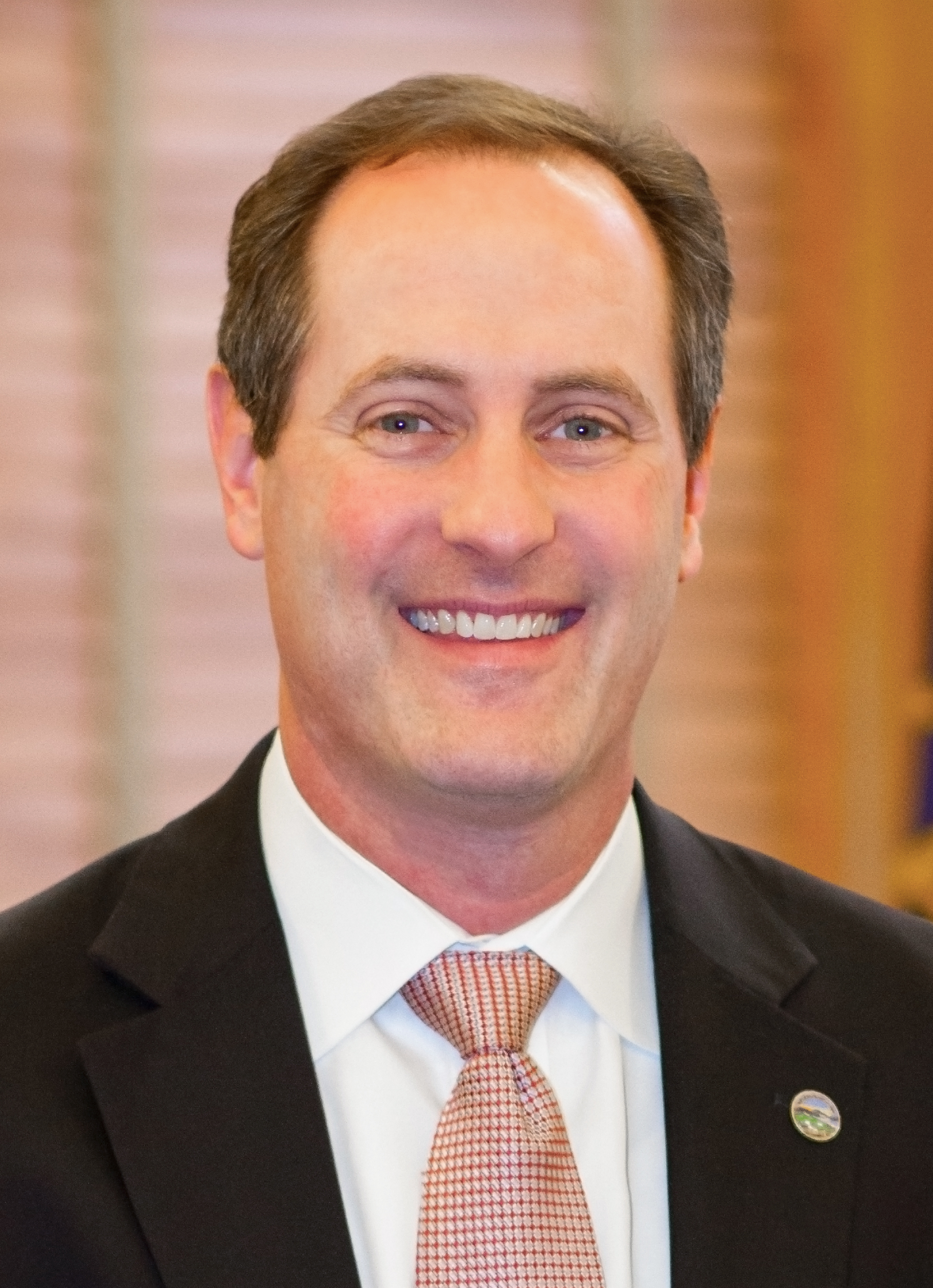

Nominee	Tracey Mann	Kali Barnett
Party	Republican	Democratic
Popular vote	208,229	84,393
Percentage	71.2%	28.8%
- County results Mann: 50–60% 60–70% 70–80% 80–90% >90% Barnett: 50–60%
U.S. Representative before election
Roger Marshall
Republican
Elected U.S. Representative
Tracey Mann
Republican

The 1st district takes in over half of Kansas, encompassing rural western and northern Kansas, including Manhattan, Salina, Dodge City, Emporia, Garden City, Hays and Hutchinson. The incumbent was Republican Roger Marshall, who was reelected with 68.1% of the vote in 2018. Marshall announced on September 7, 2019, that he would not be running for re-election, opting to run for the open U.S. Senate seat in Kansas instead.

=== Republican primary ===
==== Candidates ====
===== Nominee =====
- Tracey Mann, former lieutenant governor of Kansas (2018–2019) and candidate for Kansas's 1st congressional district in 2010

===== Eliminated in primary =====
- Bill Clifford, Finney County commissioner
- Jerry Molstad, physician assistant and retired U.S. Army colonel
- Michael Soetaert, reverend

===== Withdrew =====
- Troy Waymaster, state representative

===== Declined =====
- Tim Huelskamp, former U.S. representative for Kansas's 1st congressional district (2011–2017)
- Roger Marshall, incumbent U.S. representative (running for U.S. Senate)
- Ken Rahjes, state representative (running for re-election)

==== Endorsements ====
Bill Clifford

State officials

- Gary Harshberger, former Kansas Water Authority chairman

Organizations

- With Honor
Tracey Mann

Federal officials

- Bob Dole, former U.S. senator (R-KS) and 1996 Republican presidential nominee
- Tom Osborne, former U.S. representative (NE-03) (2001–2007)

Organizations

- Americans for Prosperity (AFP) Action
- Kansas Farm Bureau
- NRA Political Victory Fund
- Reno County Farm Bureau

==== Primary results ====
Results by county: Mann: 40–50%; 50–60%; 60–70%; 70–80%; Clifford: 40–50%; 50–60%; 60–70%; 70–80%; Molstad: 30–40%; 40–50%

Republican primary results
Party	Candidate	Votes	%
Republican	Tracey Mann	65,373	54.2
Republican	Bill Clifford	39,914	33.1
Republican	Jerry Molstad	9,545	7.9
Republican	Michael Soetaert	5,756	4.8
Total votes		120,588	100.0

=== Democratic primary ===
==== Candidates ====
===== Nominee =====
- Kali Barnett, author and teacher

===== Eliminated in primary =====
- Christy Davis, concert director

===== Withdrew =====
- Brandon Williams, local Walmart manager

==== Primary results ====
Democratic primary results
Party	Candidate	Votes	%
Democratic	Kali Barnett	16,671	62.6
Democratic	Christy Davis	9,962	37.4
Total votes		26,633	100.0

=== General election ===
==== Predictions ====
Source	Ranking	As of
The Cook Political Report	Safe R	July 2, 2020
Inside Elections	Safe R	June 2, 2020
Sabato's Crystal Ball	Safe R	July 2, 2020
Politico	Safe R	April 19, 2020
Daily Kos	Safe R	June 3, 2020
RCP	Safe R	June 9, 2020
Niskanen	Safe R	June 7, 2020

==== Polling ====
Poll source	Date(s) administered	Sample size (Note: Key: A – all adults RV – registered voters LV – likely voters V – unclear)	Margin of error	Tracey Mann (R)	Kali Barnett (D)	Undecided
VCreek/AMG (R)	September 29–30, 2020	761 (LV)	± 3.5%	61%	25%	–

==== Results ====
Kansas's 1st congressional district, 2020
Party	Candidate	Votes	%
Republican	Tracey Mann	208,229	71.2
Democratic	Kali Barnett	84,393	28.8
Total votes		292,622	100.0
Republican hold			

== District 2 ==
2020 Kansas's 2nd congressional district election
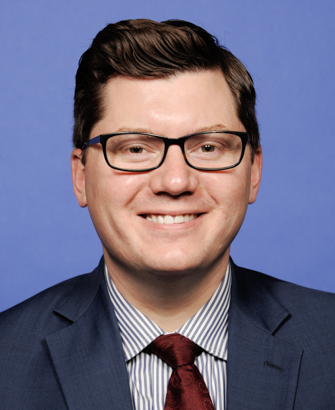

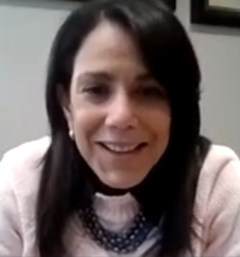
Nominee	Jake LaTurner	Michelle De La Isla
Party	Republican	Democratic
Popular vote	185,464	136,650
Percentage	55.2%	40.6%
- County results LaTurner: 50–60% 60–70% 70–80% De La Isla: 50–60% 60–70%
U.S. Representative before election
Steve Watkins
Republican
Elected U.S. Representative
Jake LaTurner
Republican

The 2nd district encompasses most of eastern Kansas from Nebraska to Oklahoma save the Kansas City metropolitan area, including both the cities of Topeka and Lawrence. The incumbent was Republican Steve Watkins, who was elected with 47.6% of the vote in 2018. In August 2019, Watkins evaded questions about his political future coming from reporters who encountered him at a Fort Scott constituent meeting in Southeast Kansas where he had been talking about aiding veterans. Kansas State Treasurer Jake LaTurner had declared his intention to run for the seat of retiring U.S. Senator Pat Roberts, but was persuaded by Republican party officials to instead run against Watkins.

=== Republican primary ===
==== Candidates ====
===== Nominee =====
- Jake LaTurner, Kansas State Treasurer

===== Eliminated in primary =====
- Dennis Taylor, former secretary of the Kansas Department of Administration, former deputy director of the Kansas Lottery, and candidate for Kansas Secretary of State in 2018
- Steve Watkins, incumbent U.S. representative

==== Endorsements ====
Jake LaTurner

State officials

- Jeff Colyer, former governor (2018–2019) and lieutenant governor (2011–2018)
- Steve Fitzgerald, former state senator (2013–2018) and 2014 and 2018 Republican candidate in KS-02
- Kevin Jones, former state representative (2013–2019)
- Doug Mays, 2018 Republican candidate in KS-02 and former state representative (1993–2006) and state House speaker (2003–2006)

Organizations

- Family Policy Alliance of Kansas
- Kansans for Life (KFL) PAC (initially co-endorsed with Steve Watkins, subsequently endorsed on his own)
- Kansas Farm Bureau
- National Association for Gun Rights
Dennis Taylor

Newspapers

- Kansas City Star
Steve Watkins

Executive officials

- Mike Pence, vice president of the United States
- Donald Trump, president of the United States

Organizations

- National Federation of Independent Business (NFIB)
- National Right to Life Committee
- NRA Political Victory Fund

==== Primary results ====
Results by county: LaTurner: 30–40%; 40–50%; 50–60%; 70–80%; Watkins: 40–50%

Republican primary results
Party	Candidate	Votes	%
Republican	Jake LaTurner	47,898	49.1
Republican	Steve Watkins (incumbent)	33,053	33.9
Republican	Dennis Taylor	16,512	17.0
Total votes		97,463	100.0

=== Democratic primary ===
==== Candidates ====
===== Nominee =====
- Michelle De La Isla, mayor of Topeka

===== Eliminated in primary =====
- James K. Windholz, graduate teaching assistant at the University of Kansas

===== Withdrawn =====
- Abbie Hodgson, former speechwriter for former governor of Kansas Kathleen Sebelius

==== Endorsements ====
Michelle De La Isla

U.S. presidents

- Barack Obama, 44th president of the United States (2009–2017), U.S. senator from Illinois (2005–2008)

Organizations

- Congressional Hispanic Caucus Bold PAC
- EMILY's List
- End Citizens United
- Latino Victory Fund
- League of Conservation Voters Action Fund
- Let America Vote
- PODER PAC
- Sierra Club

Individuals

- Pete Buttigieg, former mayor of South Bend, Indiana (2012–2020) and 2020 Democratic presidential candidate

==== Primary results ====
Democratic primary results
Party	Candidate	Votes	%
Democratic	Michelle De La Isla	41,050	75.0
Democratic	James K. Windholz	13,662	25.0
Total votes		54,712	100.0

=== General election ===
==== Predictions ====
Source	Ranking	As of
The Cook Political Report	Likely R	August 5, 2020
Inside Elections	Safe R	June 2, 2020
Sabato's Crystal Ball	Likely R	July 2, 2020
Politico	Lean R	September 8, 2020
Daily Kos	Likely R	June 3, 2020
RCP	Lean R	October 24, 2020
Niskanen	Likely R	June 7, 2020

==== Polling ====
Poll source	Date(s) administered	Sample size	Margin of error	Jake LaTurner (R)	Michelle De La Isla (D)	Other/ Undecided
VCreek/AMG (R)	September 29–30, 2020	739 (LV)	± 3.6%	47%	36%	–
DCCC Targeting & Analytics Department (D) (Note: Poll conducted for the DCCC.)	July 29–30, 2020	488 (LV)	± 4.4%	45%	41%	–
Battleground Connect (R) (Note: Poll conducted for the LaTurner campaign.)	July 16–17, 2020	1,250 (LV)	–	42%	41%	16% (Note: Undecided with 16%)

Hypothetical polling

with Steve Watkins and Michelle De La Isla

Poll source	Date(s) administered	Sample size	Margin of error	Steve Watkins (R)	Michelle De La Isla (D)	Other/ Undecided
Battleground Connect (R)	July 16–17, 2020	1,250 (LV)	–	37%	50%	13% (Note: Undecided with 13%)

==== Results ====
Kansas's 2nd congressional district, 2020
Party	Candidate	Votes	%
Republican	Jake LaTurner	185,464	55.2
Democratic	Michelle De La Isla	136,650	40.6
Libertarian	Robert Garrard	14,201	4.2
Total votes		336,315	100.0
Republican hold			

== District 3 ==
2020 Kansas's 3rd congressional district election
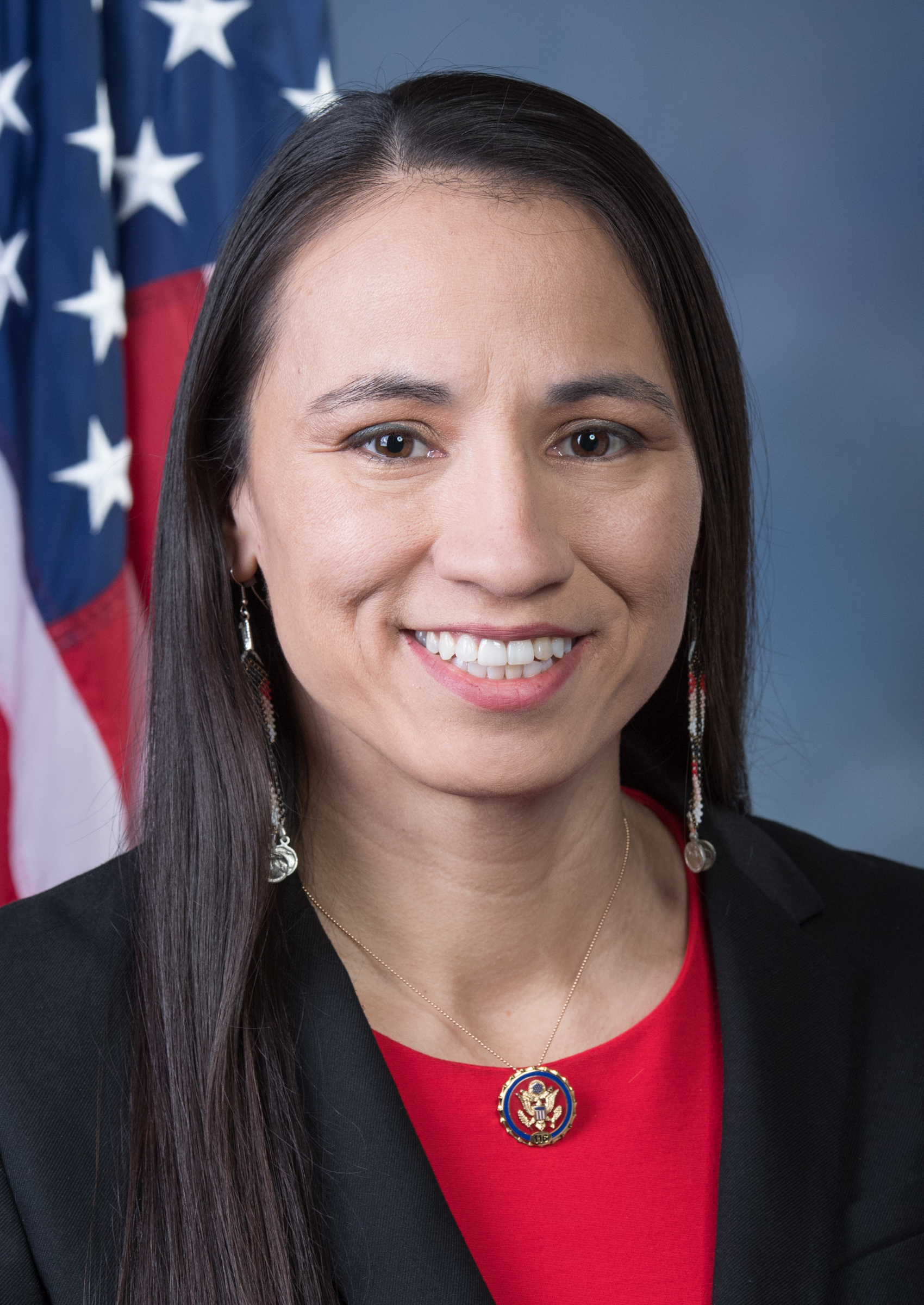

Nominee	Sharice Davids	Amanda Adkins
Party	Democratic	Republican
Popular vote	220,049	178,773
Percentage	53.6%	43.6%
- County results Davids: 50–60% 60–70% Adkins: 60–70%
U.S. Representative before election
Sharice Davids
Democratic
Elected U.S. Representative
Sharice Davids
Democratic

The 3rd district encompasses the Kansas City metropolitan area, including Kansas City, Overland Park, Lenexa, Shawnee, Spring Hill, DeSoto and Olathe. The incumbent was Democrat Sharice Davids, who flipped the district and was elected with 53.6% of the vote in 2018, unseating four-term Republican incumbent Kevin Yoder.

=== Democratic primary ===
==== Candidates ====
===== Declared =====
- Sharice Davids, incumbent U.S. representative

===== Endorsements =====
Sharice Davids

U.S. presidents

- Barack Obama, 44th president of the United States (2009–2017), U.S. senator from Illinois (2005–2008)

Local officials

- Pete Buttigieg, former mayor of South Bend, Indiana (2012–2020) and former 2020 presidential candidate

Organizations

- League of Conservation Voters Action Fund
- LGBTQ Victory Fund
- Sierra Club
- United States Chamber of Commerce (post-primary)

==== Primary results ====
Democratic primary results
Party	Candidate	Votes	%
Democratic	Sharice Davids (incumbent)	74,437	100.0
Total votes		74,437	100.0

=== Republican primary ===
==== Candidates ====
===== Nominee =====
- Amanda Adkins, Cerner Corporation executive and former Kansas Republican Party chairwoman

===== Eliminated in primary =====
- Mike Beehler, construction engineering executive
- Adrienne Foster, former mayor of Roeland Park and Small Business Administration official
- Tom Love, former state representative
- Sara Hart Weir, former CEO of the National Down Syndrome Society

===== Declined =====
- Kevin Yoder, former U.S. representative

==== Endorsements ====
Amanda Adkins

Federal officials

- Roy Blunt, U.S. senator from Missouri and former U.S. representative (MO-07) (1997–2011) and Missouri secretary of state (1985–1993)
- Ted Cruz, U.S. senator from Texas
- Sam Graves, U.S. representative (MO-06)

State officials

- Jeb Bush, former governor of Florida (1999–2007)

Organizations

- Associated General Contractors of America
- Kansans for Life (KFL) PAC (co-endorsed with Mike Beehler, Adrienne Vallejo Foster, and Sara Hart Weir)

Individuals

- Susan Pompeo, wife of Mike Pompeo, U.S. Secretary of State and former CIA director (2017–2018) and U.S. representative (R-KS-04) (2011–2017)
Mike Beehler

Organizations

- Kansans for Life (KFL) PAC (co-endorsed with Amanda Adkins, Adrienne Vallejo Foster, and Sara Hart Weir)
Adrienne Foster

Federal officials

- Todd Tiahrt, 2014 and 2017 Republican candidate in KS-04, former U.S. representative (R-KS-04) (1995–2011), and Republican candidate in 2010 U.S. Senate election in Kansas

State officials

- Bill Sutton, state representative
- Jene Vickrey, state representative and former state House majority leader and speaker pro tempore

Newspapers

- Kansas City Star

Organizations

- Kansans for Life (KFL) PAC (co-endorsed with Amanda Adkins, Mike Beehler, and Sara Hart Weir)
Sara Hart Weir

Federal officials

- Lynn Jenkins, former U.S. representative (KS-02) (2009–2019) and Kansas State Treasurer (2003–2008)
- Cathy McMorris Rodgers, U.S. representative (WA-05)

Organizations

- Kansans for Life (KFL) PAC (co-endorsed with Amanda Adkins, Mike Beehler, and Adrienne Vallejo Foster)
- Maggie's List
- Republican Main Street Partnership PAC
- Value in Electing Women (VIEW) PAC

==== Primary results ====
Republican primary results
Party	Candidate	Votes	%
Republican	Amanda Adkins	29,082	30.6
Republican	Sara Hart Weir	21,833	23.0
Republican	Adrienne Foster	19,057	20.1
Republican	Mike Beehler	18,399	19.4
Republican	Tom Love	6,533	6.9
Total votes		94,904	100.0

=== General election ===
==== Predictions ====
Source	Ranking	As of
The Cook Political Report	Safe D	October 21, 2020
Inside Elections	Safe D	October 16, 2020
Sabato's Crystal Ball	Safe D	October 15, 2020
Politico	Lean D	April 19, 2020
Daily Kos	Safe D	October 26, 2020
RCP	Likely D	October 24, 2020
Niskanen	Likely D	June 7, 2020

==== Polling ====
Poll source	Date(s) administered	Sample size	Margin of error	Sharice Davids (D)	Amanda Adkins (R)	Undecided
VCreek/AMG (R)	September 29–30, 2020	712 (LV)	± 3.6%	56%	36%	–

==== Results ====
Kansas's 3rd congressional district, 2020
Party	Candidate	Votes	%
Democratic	Sharice Davids (incumbent)	220,049	53.6
Republican	Amanda Adkins	178,773	43.6
Libertarian	Steven Hohe	11,596	2.8
Total votes		410,418	100.0
Democratic hold			

== District 4 ==
2020 Kansas's 4th congressional district election
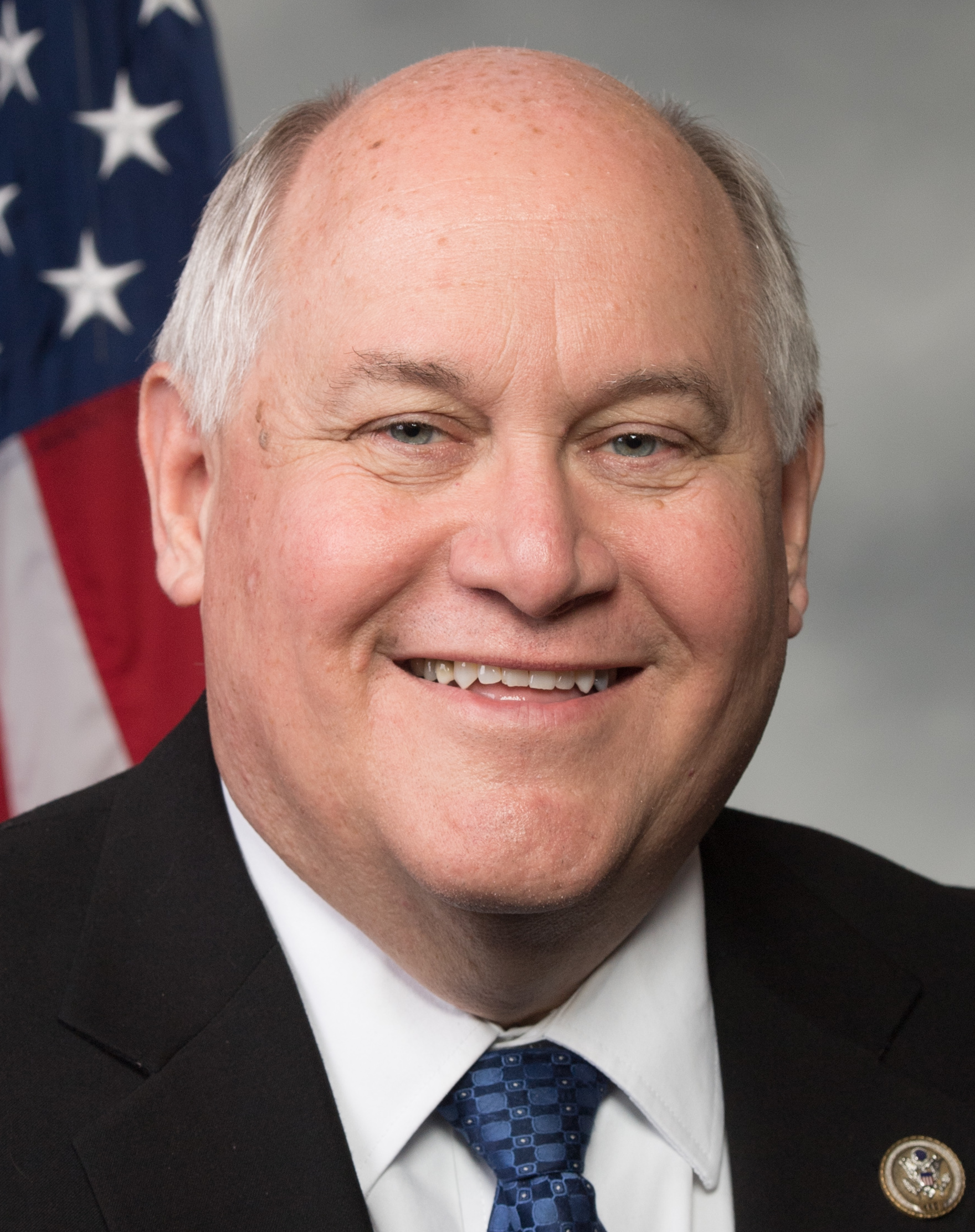

Nominee	Ron Estes	Laura Lombard
Party	Republican	Democratic
Popular vote	203,432	116,166
Percentage	63.7%	36.3%
- County results Estes: 50–60% 60–70% 70–80% 80–90%
U.S. Representative before election
Ron Estes
Republican
Elected U.S. Representative
Ron Estes
Republican

The 4th district is located in south-central Kansas, taking in Wichita and the surrounding suburbs, including Derby and Newton. The incumbent was Republican Ron Estes, who won the 2017 special election for the seat vacated by Mike Pompeo and was re-elected with 59.4% of the vote in 2018.

=== Republican primary ===
==== Candidates ====
===== Declared =====
- Ron Estes, incumbent U.S. representative

==== Primary results ====
Republican primary results
Party	Candidate	Votes	%
Republican	Ron Estes (incumbent)	87,877	100.0
Total votes		87,877	100.0

=== Democratic primary ===
==== Candidates ====
===== Declared =====
- Laura Lombard, business consultant and candidate for Kansas's 4th congressional district in 2018

==== Primary results ====
Democratic primary results
Party	Candidate	Votes	%
Democratic	Laura Lombard	35,437	100.0
Total votes		35,437	100.0

=== General election ===
==== Predictions ====
Source	Ranking	As of
The Cook Political Report	Safe R	July 2, 2020
Inside Elections	Safe R	June 2, 2020
Sabato's Crystal Ball	Safe R	July 2, 2020
Politico	Safe R	April 19, 2020
Daily Kos	Safe R	June 3, 2020
RCP	Safe R	June 9, 2020
Niskanen	Safe R	June 7, 2020

==== Polling ====
Poll source	Date(s) administered	Sample size	Margin of error	Ron Estes (R)	Laura Lombard (D)	Undecided
VCreek/AMG (R)	September 29–30, 2020	842 (LV)	± 3.3%	51%	37%	–

==== Results ====
Kansas's 4th congressional district, 2020
Party	Candidate	Votes	%
Republican	Ron Estes (incumbent)	203,432	63.7
Democratic	Laura Lombard	116,166	36.3
Total votes		319,598	100.0
Republican hold			

== Notes ==
Partisan clients
