= 2025 Topeka mayoral election =

Local election in Kansas, US

- November 4, 2025
Nominee	Spencer Duncan	Henry McClure
Party	Nonpartisan	Nonpartisan
Popular vote	12,723	4,111
Percentage	75.1%	24.3%
Mayor before election
Mike Padilla
Nonpartisan
Elected mayor
Spencer Duncan
Nonpartisan

The 2025 Topeka mayoral election was held on November 4, 2025, following a primary election on August 5, 2025, to elect the Mayor of Topeka, Kansas. Incumbent mayor Mike Padilla chose not to seek re-election to a second term. Six candidates ran to succeed him, with the top two candidates advancing to the general election. In the primary election, city councilman Spencer Duncan placed first with 60% of the vote and advanced to the general election with developer and far-right activist Henry McClure, who placed second with 14 percent.

== Primary election ==
=== Candidates ===
- Spencer Duncan, city councilman
- Henry McClure, developer and far-right activist
- James L. Bolden Jr., businessman
- Ed Patton, former mayor of Leon
- Chad Fay, healthcare worker
- Gabriel Killman, cabinet worker

==== Declined ====
- Mike Padilla, incumbent mayor

=== Results ===
Primary election results
Candidate	Votes	%
Spencer Duncan	4,456	60.16%
Henry McClure	1,057	14.27%
James L. Bolden Jr.	535	7.22%
Ed Patton	497	6.71%
Chad Fay	437	5.90%
Gabriel Killman	425	5.74%
Total votes	7,407	100.00%

== General election ==
=== Results ===
2025 Topeka mayoral election
Candidate	Votes	%
Spencer Duncan	12,723	75.07%
Henry McClure	4,111	24.26%
Write-in	115	0.68%
Total votes	16,949	100.00%
