= Joan Wagnon =

American politician (born 1940)

Chair of the Kansas Democratic Party
- In office 2011–2015
- Preceded by: Lawrence Gates
- Succeeded by: Larry Meeker

Kansas Secretary of Revenue
- In office January 13, 2003 – January 10, 2011
- Governor: Kathleen Sebelius; Mark Parkinson
- Preceded by: Steve Richards
- Succeeded by: Nick Jordan

Mayor of Topeka
- In office 1997–2001
- Preceded by: Butch Felker
- Succeeded by: Butch Felker

Member of the Kansas House of Representatives from the 55th district
- In office 1983–1994

Personal details
- Born: October 17, 1940 (age 85) Texarkana, Arkansas, U.S.
- Party: Democratic
- Spouse: William O. Wagnon
- Children: Jack, William
- Education: Hendrix College

Joan Wagnon (née Davis; born October 17, 1940) is an American former politician. She was a representative in the Kansas House of Representatives between 1983 and 1995 and the mayor of Topeka, Kansas, between 1997 and 2001. She was secretary of the Kansas Department of Revenue from 2003 to 2011, when she took over as chair of the Kansas Democratic Party, a position that she held until 2015.

== Early life ==
Wagnon was born on October 17, 1940, in Texarkana, Arkansas. She was the eldest of two daughters of Jack Davis, an electrician, and Louise Davis (née Lucas), a businesswoman. She received a bachelors of arts degree in biology in 1962 from Hendrix College in Conway, Arkansas, and worked as a research assistant at the University of Arkansas Medical School between 1962 and 1964. She married William O. Wagnon, a college professor who served as the pro-science chair of the Kansas State Board of Education, in 1964 and the couple had two children: Jack and William III. She worked as a senior research assistant at the medical school of the University of Missouri between 1964 and 1968, the same year that she received her masters of education in counseling and guidance from the same institution.

She worked as a teacher at Northern Hills Junior High School in Topeka, Kansas, in the 1968–1969 school year and at the J.S. Kendall School in Belmont, Massachusetts, in the 1970–1971 school year. She was a counselor at the Youth Corps in Topeka and in 1977, she was hired as the executive director of the Topeka chapter of the Young Women's Christian Association (YWCA).

== Political career ==
Wagnon was a representative in the Kansas House of Representatives from 1983 to 1995, leaving her seat to run in the 1994 Democratic gubernatorial primary where she finished second in a field of five. She was the Mayor of Topeka from 1997 to 2001, the city's first female mayor. She was the state's Secretary of Revenue from January 13, 2003, to January 2011. She served as the chair of the Kansas Democratic Party from 2011 to 2015, rebuilding it from an electoral calamity it suffered in 2010, while substantially expanding the use of information technology in its efforts.
