= Atomism (disambiguation) =

Atomism may refer to:

- Atomism, the natural philosophy pertaining to the fundamental composition of the physical world
- Atomism (social), a doctrine that individuals are the fundamental, and pre-eminent, components of society
- Logical atomism, a doctrine that the world consists of fundamental facts

== See also ==
- Atomistic (disambiguation)
