= Chuck Wright (politician) =

American politician

Mayor of Topeka, Kansas
- In office 1965–1969
- Preceded by: Hal Gerlach
- Succeeded by: Gene C. Martin

Topeka Street Commissioner
- In office 1961–1965
- Preceded by: Bill Mallory
- Succeeded by: ?

Personal details
- Born: Charles Wesley Wright, Jr. August 17, 1919 Topeka, Kansas
- Died: December 27, 2016 (aged 97)
- Party: Republican
- Spouse: Alice Clare Wright (1944–2008; her death)
- Children: Charles Wright III; Douglas S. Wright; Catherine Howard

Charles Wesley Wright, Jr. (August 17, 1919 – December 27, 2016) was an American politician, former advertising executive, publisher, and Christmas tree farmer who served as the mayor of Topeka, Kansas, from 1965 until 1969. Wright was mayor on June 8, 1966, when an F5 tornado devastated Topeka, killing 16 people, left 4,500 residents homeless, and caused an estimated $100 million in property damage. He led the cleanup and recovery efforts in the aftermath of the tornado to rebuild the city and Washburn University.

Wright's son, Doug Wright, also served as Mayor of Topeka from 1983 to 1989.

== Biography ==
=== Early life ===
Chuck Wright was born on August 17, 1919, at Christ's Hospital (present-day Stormont Vail Health) as one of three children of Charles W. and Mary Kanode Wright. His mother was a public health nurse, while his father had been employed in the passenger department of the Santa Fe Railway.

Wright graduated from Topeka High School in 1937 and received his bachelor's degree in 1941 from the University of Kansas. He enlisted in the United States Navy in 1941 following the country's entry into World War II and trained at the Naval Station Great Lakes in Illinois. He served as a naval hospital corpsman in the Pacific theater. He retired with the rank of Captain after the war and married his wife, the former Alice Clare Brownfield, at a ceremony on September 2, 1944, in Washington, D.C. The couple had three children, Charles, Douglas and Catherine.

=== Career ===
Following the end of the war, Wright returned to Kansas where he initially took a job with the Kansas Industrial Development Commission. He was then hired for an advertising and public relations position at Standard Oil of Indiana. Wright then worked as an assistant advertising manager for a Chicago-based company from 1951 until 1954. He moved back to Kansas to partner with his cousin, Duane Patterson, to form the Patterson-Wright Advertising Agency; their partnership ended in 1960.

=== Political career ===
In 1961, Wright defeated incumbent Topeka city street commissioner Bill Mallory, who was seeking re-election. According to Wright, he thought Mallory, who was 72-years old at the time, was a "a fine old gentleman", but didn't think he or the streets department were accomplishing anything. Wright served as the city's street commissioner from 1961 until 1965.

Upon taking office, Wright soon realized the Topeka city government had no written minimum street standards. He hired his predecessor, Bill Mallory, to supervise street upgrades in the city's Highland Park neighborhood and convened a panel of private sector engineers new minimum street standards in writing. Wright also realized that the city's street crews were testing the strength of street subsurface by applying pressure with the heel of their boots. To correct this, and scientifically justify the cost of any street resurfacing projects to officials, Wright ordered new $300 densometers to measure the strength of the surface instead.

=== Mayor of Topeka ===
Chuck Wright was elected Mayor of Topeka in 1965. He faced the first major disaster of his tenure when the Melan Arch Bridge collapsed in July 1965, just three months after he took office. The bridge collapse had been unexpected, as the new North Kansas Avenue Bridge had been under construction nearby at the time. An investigation later concluded that the construction of the new structure had contributed to the collapse, which Wright explained in 2000 saying that the new construction had "caused the riverbed to shift away support from the old bridge...It was a disaster. No one expected the riverbed to shift. It was just one of those things that did happen."

On June 8, 1966, a much larger natural disaster struck Topeka when an F5 tornado cut a swath across the city and destroyed much of Washburn University. The tornado first touched down near the intersection of S.W. 29th and Gage Street and moved northeast across the city for 27 miles. 16 people were killed by the June 1966 tornado, which also left approximately 4,500 residents homeless and caused an estimated $100 million in damage.

Wright proposed a new crosstown thruway to be built essentially along the southwest-to-northeast path of the tornado. The new road was never constructed, but the proposal did lead to several thoroughfares which were built decades later. He also created the first Topeka chapter of the Better Business Bureau in the aftermath of the 1966 tornado in response to a number of scams which preyed on the victims of the disaster.

Wright won re-election to a second term in 1967, but declined to seek re-election 1969.

Wright would later state that one of his greatest accomplishments as mayor was the passing of the city's first fair housing ordinance.

=== Post-political career ===
Soon after leaving political office, Wright and his wife moved to a home on 70 acres of land near Lecompton, Kansas, which had belonged to the Wright family since 1856.

Wright started his own advertising and public relations agency. He also began selling cancer insurance, a moved that proved so successful that his insurance company promoted him to manager for the entire state of Missouri. He retired from the insurance industry in 1987.

Wright and his wife, Alice Claire, also established a Christmas tree farm, called Edgewood Tree Farm, on their land in Lecompton. The pick-your-own Christmas tree business lasted from the late 1960s until the 1990s, when many of their trees were killed by pine wilt disease, also known as bursaphelenchus xylophilus.

In the 1970s, the Wrights purchased Christmas Trees Magazine, a trade magazine with subscribers throughout the U.S. and Canada, which they continued to publish after the closure of their tree farm in the 1990s. In 2002, the National Christmas Tree Association awarded Wright its inaugural Outstanding Service to the Christmas Tree Industry Award.

In June 2016, Wright was honored on the 50th anniversary of the 1966 Topeka tornado. His efforts to rebuild the city were recognized in Twist of Fate, a commemorative piece produced by The Topeka Capital-Journal.

Chuck Wright died on December 27, 2016, at the age of 97 following a short illness. His wife, Alice Clare, whom he married in 1944, died in 2008.
