= Atomistic =

Atomistic may refer to:

- Atomistics, the branch of science dealing with atoms
- Atomistic market or Atomistic competition, in economics; a market where no single player can affect the market
- Atomistic (order theory)

== See also ==
- Atomism (disambiguation)
