= Butch Felker =

American mayor (1945-2008)

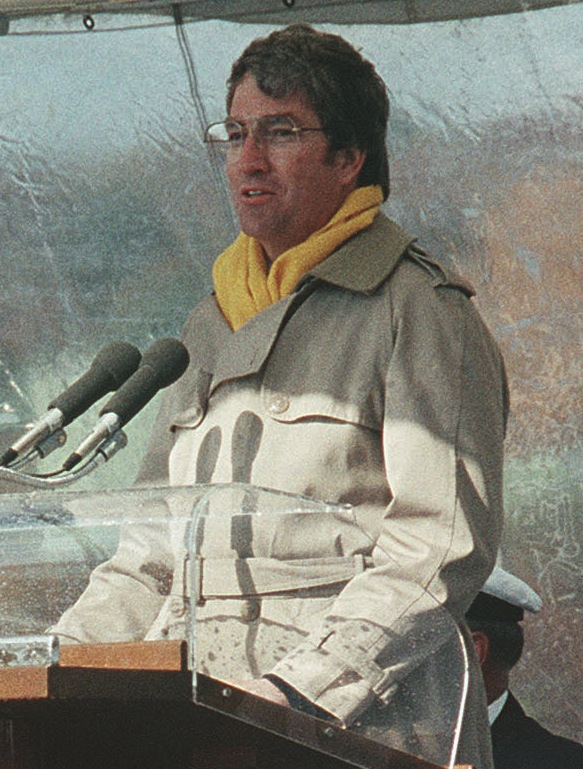
- Felker in 1989

Mayor of Topeka
- In office 2002–2003
- Preceded by: Joan Wagnon
- Succeeded by: James McClinton
- In office 1990–1997
- Preceded by: Douglas S. Wright
- Succeeded by: Joan Wagnon

Personal details
- Born: September 13, 1945 Topeka, Kansas, U.S.
- Died: January 3, 2008 (aged 62) Topeka, Kansas, U.S.
- Education: Washburn University; Washburn School of Law

Harry L. "Butch" Felker III (September 13, 1945 – January 3, 2008) was an American politician and former Mayor of Topeka, Kansas who served two full terms and one portion of a term, resigning in 2003 due to political pressure as a result of a scandal.

Felker lived in Kansas his whole life, having attended Topeka public schools and then Washburn University, where he graduated with a Bachelor of Arts degree in political science in 1967. He subsequently attended Washburn School of Law where he earned his Juris Doctor in 1972. Following college, he first entered in the public life as the elected parks and Recreation commissioner of Topeka, a position he held from 1975 to 1985. He subsequently ran for mayor in 1989 and served for two terms before resigning due to health problems in 1997. In 2001, he ran for mayor again and served until 2003 before resigning amid a scandal. After leaving office, he ran the nonprofit Heartland Park Foundation.

== Scandal and resignation ==
In 2002, Felker was investigated by the Kansas Governmental Ethics Commission who charged him with six counts of violating the state's campaign finance laws. This included allegations that employees of the Topeka Convention and Visitors Bureau filed false travel expense reports and subsequently donated the money to Felker's re-election campaign. The sources of these donations were also not properly documented by the campaign. In July 2003, he pleaded guilty to three ethics violations and two other ethics charges were subsequently dropped. He was fined $7,500.

As a result of those violations, and of other alleged misconduct, the Shawnee County district attorney, Robert Hecht, brought an ouster trial against Felker and suspended him from work on October 10, 2003. The trial had been scheduled for November 17, 2003, although it was cancelled after Felker resigned from office on November 6. Duane Pomeroy, his deputy mayor, became the acting mayor following his resignation and during his suspension.

In 2005, a second ethical complaint on the same incident was filed by a Kansas state disciplinary panel, this time alleging that he broke rules of professional conduct for lawyers.

Preceded by Douglas S. Wright	Mayor of Topeka, Kansas; 1990–1997	Succeeded by Joan Wagnon
Preceded by Joan Wagnon	Mayor of Topeka, Kansas; 2002–2003	Succeeded by Duane Pomeroy
