= James McClinton =

American mayor (born 1961)

James A. McClinton

Mayor of Topeka
- In office January 2004 – April 2005
- Preceded by: Butch Felker
- Succeeded by: Bill Bunten

Personal details
- Born: 1961 (age 64–65) Milwaukee, Wisconsin, U.S.
- Party: Democratic
- Spouse: Marthalee (Divorced)
- Education: Washburn University; University of Kansas

James A. McClinton (born 1961) is a Kansas politician, originally from Milwaukee, Wisconsin, and former mayor of Topeka, Kansas who served only a portion of his term from January 2004 to April 2005. He was appointed by the city council to replace Butch Felker, who resigned amid a campaign finance scandal (Duane Pomeroy served as acting mayor from November to December 2003). McClinton had previously served on the city council from 1991 to 1993 and from 1997 to 2001. He is a member of the Democratic Party.

James McClinton was born in Milwaukee, then moved to Helena, Arkansas in early childhood, and then finally to Topeka. After graduating from Washburn Rural High School, he attended Washburn University, where he received a minor degree in psychology, an associate degree in mental health and a bachelor's degree in criminal justice. He received his master's degree in public administration from the University of Kansas with honors.

McClinton's short stint as mayor is significant for its firsts and lasts. He was the first African-American mayor of Topeka and the first mayor to be appointed by the city council (he was chosen from a field of 40 candidates by the city council). However, he was also the last mayor to serve the city with full authority as the populace subsequently voted in a referendum for council-manager form of government in 2004 which stripped the mayor position of most of his or her powers. Instead, a new city manager and the city council would hold non-ceremonial power (the decision to include this initiative on the 2004 ballot was made prior to the appointment of McClinton, possibly in reaction to Felker's alleged abuses). In 2004, McClinton decided against running for a full term as a "ceremonial" mayor.

During his time as mayor, Topeka celebrated its 150th anniversary. The city was also honored by a visit from George W. Bush, Stephen Breyer and John Kerry, celebrating the anniversary of the landmark Brown v. Board of Education decision which ended racial segregation in schools and the renovated Brown v. Board of Education National Historic Site. Mayor McClinton created a large diverse group of community leaders and charged them to create a Riverfront Development Plan. He submitted that plan to the city council prior to leaving office. The Riverfront Plan was approved by the council, received approval by the Kansas Legislature, and signed into law by former Kansas Governor Kathleen Sebelius. Mayor McClinton created new community development strategies to revitalize the inner city, his new program received a Regional Award from the U.S. Department of Housing and Urban Development. McClinton, along with other national mayors collaborated with the White House to eradicate homelessness in 10 years. Through mayor McClinton's leadership, the City of Topeka was recognized with several "Best Practices" citations. Mayor McClinton created a partnership with the University of Kansas to forgive tuition for students who returned to the community and committed to community service.

After leaving office in 2005, Mayor McClinton worked with a local developer in several states revitalizing inner cities. In 2007, Mayor McClinton moved to the Dallas area. McClinton is Director, Community Development and Housing, Tarrant County, TX. Tarrant County is the 15th largest county in the United States. He also owns McClinton Consulting. McClinton is the father of two daughters, Jameika (McClinton) Knight and Tawana McClinton and has six grandchildren.

In 2020, McClinton became a Biden/Harris(TX)Delegate to the Democratic National Convention.

== Career ==
At the age of 19, he began a long career of supervisory and management in both public agencies and in the private sector. His career in management and administration includes mental health management, correctional hospital administration, state nursing board management, correctional management, both adult and juvenile justice administration, human resource and project management. McClinton has in excess of twenty years of administrative and managerial experience managing people, projects, resources and a multitude of operational budgets.

== Honors ==
- Trumpet Awards Foundation Seat of Distinction,
- Who's Who in the World,
- Marquis Who's Who In America,
- Washburn University Alumni Fellow,
- Washburn Rural High School Hall of Fame Inductee
- Outstanding Young Men of America.

Preceded by Butch Felker	Mayor of Topeka, Kansas; 2004 – 2005	Succeeded by Bill Bunten
