= Jim Long (Kansas politician) =

American politician

Member of the Kansas House of Representatives from the 38th district
- In office 1993 – January 24, 1998
- Preceded by: Tom Love
- Succeeded by: Margaret Long
- In office 1989–1990
- Preceded by: John Sutter
- Succeeded by: Tom Love

Personal details
- Born: October 9, 1936 Kansas City, Kansas
- Died: January 24, 1998 (aged 61) Kansas City, Kansas
- Party: Democratic
- Spouse: Margaret Long

James W. "Jim" Long (October 9, 1936 – January 24, 1998) was an American politician who served in the Kansas House of Representatives as a Democrat from the 38th district. He was originally appointed to the seat to fill the vacancy left by the resignation of John F. Sutter. After a one-term absence in which the seat was held by Tom Love, Long reclaimed the seat in the 1992 election and served until his death in 1998. His wife, Margaret Long, was appointed to succeed him.
