= Michelle De La Isla =

American politician (born 1976)

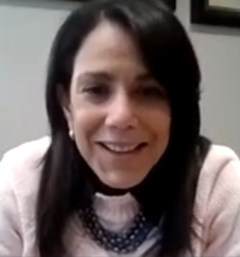

Mayor of Topeka
- In office January 8, 2018 – January 4, 2022
- Preceded by: Larry Wolgast
- Succeeded by: Mike Padilla

Personal details
- Born: March 19, 1976 (age 50) New York City, U.S.
- Party: Democratic
- Children: 2 daughters, 1 son
- Education: University of Puerto Rico, Mayagüez; Wichita State University (BS); Fort Hays State University (MBA); Harvard University

Michelle De La Isla (born March 19, 1976) is an American politician who served as the mayor of Topeka, Kansas from 2018 to 2022. She previously served on the Topeka City Council from 2013 to 2018. De La Isla was the city's first Latina and single mother to serve as mayor. She was the Democratic nominee for Kansas's 2nd congressional district in the 2020 election, but lost.

== Early life and education ==
Born in New York City, De La Isla grew up mostly in Puerto Rico. She attended the University of Puerto Rico at Mayagüez before moving to Wichita, Kansas in 2000. She experienced homelessness and gave birth to a child as a teenager. In 2001, she graduated from Wichita State University with a bachelor of science degree in biology. She received an MBA in leadership and human resources from Fort Hays State University and is in the MPA program for mid-career professionals at Harvard University.

== Career ==
De La Isla worked as a teacher for Upward Bound. In 2005, she moved to Topeka, Kansas, and joined Housing and Credit Counseling, Inc. as its community relations and Spanish services coordinator, and later, its chief financial officer.

=== Politics ===
In 2013, De La Isla ran for Topeka City Council and was elected to represent the fifth district. She served as deputy mayor to mayor Larry Wolgast in 2016. De La Isla announced her candidacy for mayor on April 11, 2017 after Wolgast announced he would not seek reelection.

On November 7, 2017, De La Isla won the Topeka mayoral race by a margin of 501 votes. Before the election, De La Isla also announced that she would continue her employment at Evergy, which also makes her the first mayor to hold additional employment during her tenure.

As mayor, De La Isla serves on the Washburn University Board of Regents, the Board of the Joint Economic Development Organization, and as Tri-Chair of GO Topeka’s Momentum 2022 collective action plan for Topeka and Shawnee County.

On January 6, 2020, De La Isla announced she was running as a Democrat to represent Kansas's 2nd congressional district. On August 4, De La Isla won the Democratic primary to advance to the November 3, 2020 general election. She was defeated by Kansas Treasurer Jake LaTurner in the November general election.

On March 19, 2021, De La Isla announced that she would not run for another term as mayor.

In September, 2023, De La Isla was hired as chief executive at Boston-based nonprofit Hack.Diversity.

== Personal life ==
De La Isla has two daughters and one son.

Political offices
Preceded by Larry Wolgast	Mayor of Topeka; 2018–2022	Succeeded by Mike Padilla
