= Bill Bunten =

American politician (1930–2020)

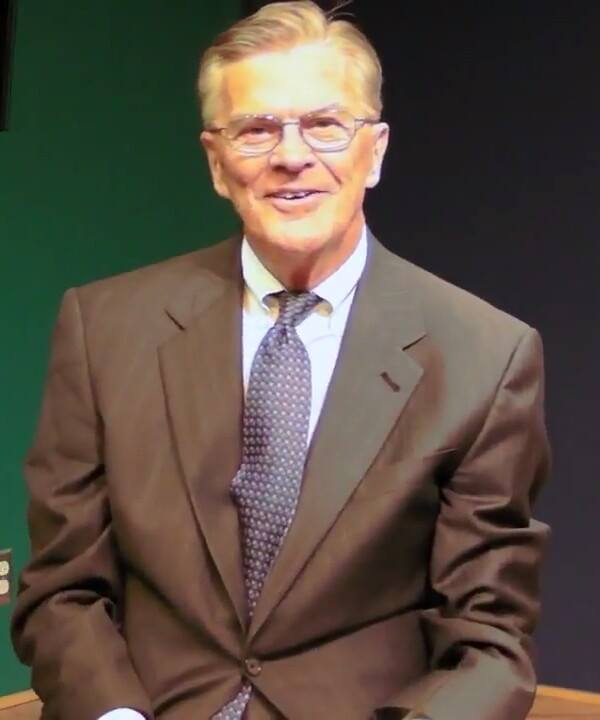
- Bunten in 2011

Mayor of Topeka
- In office April 5, 2005 – April 9, 2013
- Preceded by: James McClinton
- Succeeded by: Larry Wolgast

Member of the Kansas Senate from the 20th district
- In office January 13, 2003 – 2004
- Preceded by: Lynn Jenkins
- Succeeded by: Vicki Schmidt

Member of the Kansas House of Representatives
- In office January 14, 1963 – January 14, 1991
- Preceded by: Ernest J. Underwood
- Succeeded by: William Roy Jr.
- Constituency: 34th District (1963-1965); 33rd District (1965-1967); 47th District (1967-1973); 54th District (1973-1991)

Personal details
- Born: William Wallace Bunten; April 5, 1930 Topeka, Kansas, U.S.
- Died: February 29, 2020 (aged 89) Topeka, Kansas, U.S.
- Party: Republican
- Spouse: Jo Ann Bunten (m. 1962)
- Children: 2

Military service
- Allegiance: United States
- Branch/service: United States Marine Corps
- Rank: Captain

William Wallace Bunten (April 5, 1930 – February 29, 2020) was an American politician from Kansas. He served as mayor of Topeka, Kansas, having been elected to a four-year term in 2005 and re-elected in 2009. Before being elected mayor, he served in the Kansas House of Representatives from 1963 to 1991 and in the Kansas Senate from 2003 to 2004. He previously ran for mayor in 2001 and in a special election in 2003. To date, Bunten is the last member of the Republican Party to serve as Topeka mayor.

Bunten was the first mayor to be elected in Topeka under the new council-manager government, which stripped most of the powers of the office of mayor. Instead, the city council and appointed city manager held most of the power. As such, Bunten's role was limited to leading city council meetings, promoting economic development, and being the "ceremonial head" of the city. He replaced James McClinton as mayor, who did not seek a second term after the powers of the office were reduced.

A native Topekan, Bunten was a basketball player while attending Topeka High School. He was a teammate and good friend of Dean Smith, who later went on to fame as a basketball coach at North Carolina. Bunten and Smith both attended the University of Kansas and were members of Phi Gamma Delta social fraternity. After college Bunten entered the US Marine Corps and served in Korea, rising to the rank of captain.

In 2010, Bunten decided to change the name of Topeka to Google in honor of the company Google, Inc. for one day. This was considered a ploy to attract Google to Topeka as a site for a high speed Internet installation. The site eventually was located in Kansas City, Kansas.

Bunten led an effort to improve the downtown area and promoted a plan to raise funds for the development of the area.

In 2012, Bill Bunten announced that he would not seek re-election in April 2013 at a City Council meeting.

He died of complications of pneumonia on February 29, 2020.

Kansas House of Representatives
Preceded by Ernest J. Underwood	Kansas House of Representatives; District 34th January 14, 1963 - January 11, 1965	Succeeded by LaVerne H. Spears
Kansas House of Representatives
Preceded by Robert Harder	Kansas House of Representatives; District 33rd January 11, 1965 - January 9, 1967	Succeeded by Melvin B. Brockman
Kansas House of Representatives
Preceded by Don Teter	Kansas House of Representatives; District 47th January 9, 1967 - January 8, 1973	Succeeded by William C. Stutz
Kansas House of Representatives
Preceded by James L. Ungerer	Kansas House of Representatives; District 54th January 8, 1973 - January 14, 1991	Succeeded by William Roy Jr.
