= Tom Love (politician) =

American politician, teacher and businessman

Member of the Kansas House of Representatives from the 38th district
- In office January 14, 1991 – January 11, 1993
- Preceded by: Jim Long
- Succeeded by: Jim Long

Personal details
- Born: February 17, 1953 (age 73)
- Party: Republican

Tom Love (born February 17, 1953) is an American businessman, educator, and politician who served as a member of the Kansas House of Representatives from 1991 to 1992. He was an unsuccessful candidate for Kansas's 3rd congressional district in the 2020 election, placing fifth in the Republican primary.

Outside of politics, Love has worked as an elementary school teacher and real estate investor in Overland Park, Kansas.
