= Kathy Wolfe Moore =

American politician

Kathy Moore

Member of the Kansas House of Representatives from the 36th district
- In office January 10, 2011 – January 9, 2023
- Preceded by: Margaret Long
- Succeeded by: Lynn Melton

Personal details
- Born: March 6, 1957 (age 69)
- Party: Democratic
- Spouse: Ken Moore

Kathy Wolfe Moore (born March 6, 1957) was a Democratic member of the Kansas House of Representatives, representing the 36th district. She is the Ranking Member of the House Appropriations Committee and the House Committee on Legislative Budget .

Moore earned a Bachelor's degree from the University of Kansas in 1979. Before going into politics, she worked as a business director and assistant to the CEO at the University of Kansas Hospital. She was named a 2019 Kansas Hospital Association Distinguished Health Care Advocate.

== Political career ==
Moore first took office in the Kansas House of Representatives on January 10, 2011. Her last term ended on January 9, 2023.

She has also served on the Committee of Health and Human Services (2020), 2021 Special Committee on Federal 340B Drug Program, and the Legislative budget committee.

She has advocated for the abolishment of the death penalty, an increase of the minimum wage, and the legalization of medical marijuana in Kansas.
