= Atomism (social) =

Sociological theory

Atomism or social atomism is a sociological theory arising from the scientific notion atomic theory, coined by the ancient Greek philosopher Democritus and the Roman philosopher Lucretius. In the scientific rendering of the word, atomism refers to the notion that all matter in the universe is composed of basic indivisible components, or atoms. When placed into the field of sociology, atomism assigns the individual as the basic unit of analysis for all implications of social life. This theory refers to "the tendency for society to be made up of a collection of self-interested and largely self-sufficient individuals, operating as separate atoms." Therefore, all social values, institutions, developments and procedures evolve entirely out of the interests and actions of the individuals who inhabit any particular society. The individual is the "atom" of society and therefore the only true object of concern and analysis.

== Political implications ==
Political theorists such as John Locke and Thomas Hobbes extend social atomism to the political realm. They assert that human beings are fundamentally self-interested, equal, and rational social atoms that together form an aggregate society of self-interested individuals. Those participating in society must sacrifice a portion of their individual rights in order to form a social contract with the other persons in society. Ultimately, although some rights are renounced, self-interested cooperation occurs for the mutual preservation of the individuals and for society at large.

According to the philosopher Charles Taylor,

The term "atomism" is used loosely to characterize the doctrines of social contract theory which arose in the seventeenth century and also successor doctrines which may not have made use of the concept of social contract but which inherited a vision of society as in some sense constituted by individuals for the fulfilment of ends which were primarily individual. Certain forms of utilitarianism are successor doctrines in this sense. The term is also applied to contemporary doctrines which hark back to social contract theory, or which try to defend in some sense the priority of the individual and his rights over society, or which present a purely instrumental view of society.

== Critiques ==
Those who criticize the theory of social atomism believe that it neglects the idea of the individual as unique. The sociologist Elizabeth Wolgast asserts that,

From the atomistic standpoint, the individuals who make up a society are interchangeable like molecules in a bucket of water – society a mere aggregate of individuals. This introduces a harsh and brutal equality into our theory of human life and it contradicts our experience of human beings as unique and irreplaceable, valuable in virtue of their variety – in what they don't share – not in virtue of their common ability to reason.

Those who question social atomism argue that it is unjust to treat all persons equally when individual necessities and circumstances are clearly dissimilar.

== See also ==
- Anomie
- Differentiation (sociology)
- Holism
- Id, ego and super-ego § Ego
- Independence
- Individualism
- Social alienation
- Social integration
- Socialization
- Subjectivity and objectivity (philosophy)
