= Margaret Long =

American politician (born 1938)

Member of the Kansas House of Representatives from the 36th district
- In office January 13, 2003 – January 10, 2011
- Preceded by: Douglas Spangler
- Succeeded by: Kathy Wolfe Moore

Member of the Kansas House of Representatives from the 38th district
- In office February 9, 1998 – January 13, 2003
- Preceded by: Jim Long
- Succeeded by: Rob Boyer

Personal details
- Born: July 26, 1938 (age 87) Kansas City, Kansas, U.S.
- Party: Democratic
- Spouse(s): (m. Jim Long; his death 2003)

Margaret Long (born July 26, 1938) is an American politician who is a former Democratic member of the Kansas House of Representatives, representing the 36th district. She began her service via an appointment on February 2, 1998.

Long is a retired administrative accountant.

== Committee membership ==
- Transportation (Ranking Member)
- Energy and Utilities
- Financial Institutions
- Insurance
- Joint Committee on Pensions, Investments and Benefits
- Select Committee on KPERS

== Major donors ==
The top 5 donors to Long's 2008 campaign:

- 1. AT&T $750
- 2. Kansas Contractors Assoc $600
- 3. Chesapeake Energy $500
- 4. Carpenters District Council of Kansas City $500
- 5. Kansas Optometric Association $500
