= Jim Sherow =

American author

James Sherow is an author and emeritus Distinguished Professor of environmental and the American West at Kansas State University and was a regional Democratic politician in Kansas. He is most notable for serving as a city commissioner and mayor of the city of Manhattan, Kansas. He was the Democratic nominee for the First District in the United States House of Representatives elections in Kansas, 2014, running against incumbent Tim Huelskamp.

== Early life ==
Jim Sherow was born in Hutchinson Kansas and raised in Maize Kansas. Sherow's father and uncles served in the military during World War II. Sherow volunteered for military service in the air force during the Vietnam War from 1970-1974.

== University career ==
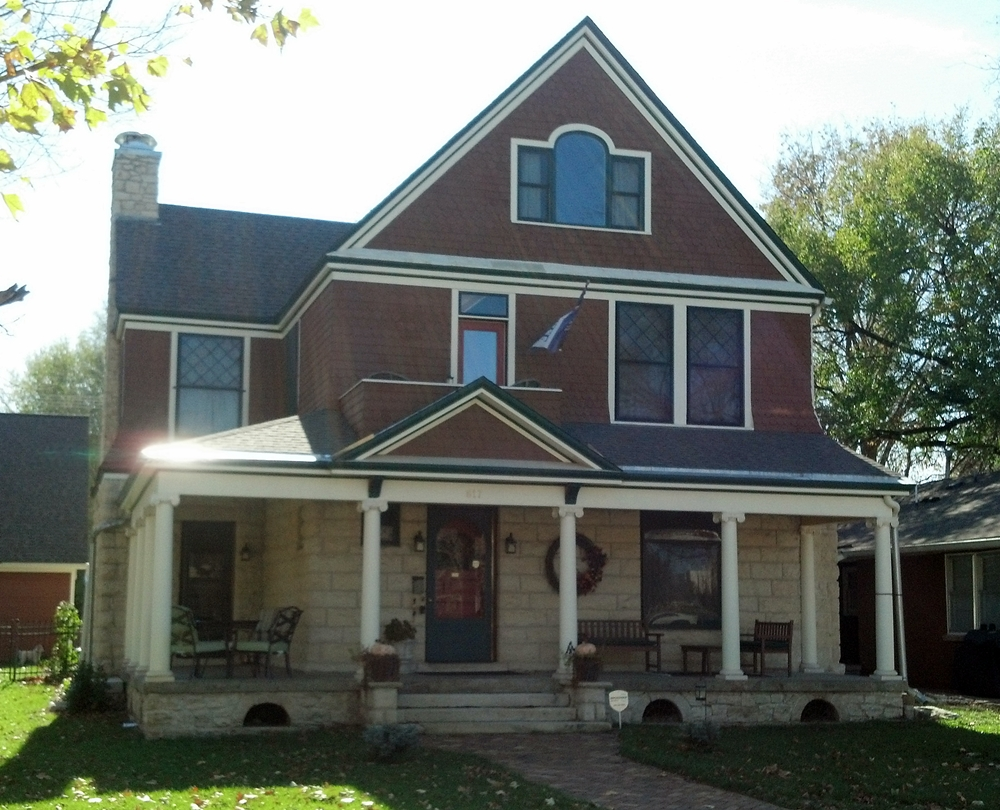
The Hulse-Daughters House in Manhattan Kansas which Sherow and his wife renovated and turned into a bed and breakfast

At Wichita State University Sherow received his bachelor's degree in 1976 and his masters in 1978. He finished his Ph.D. in History at the University of Colorado Boulder in 1987. His dissertation was titled "Discord in the Valley of Content" and received a "Westerners International-Phi Alpha Theta Award" for the historical subfield of "Western history".

Sherow taught at Southwest Texas State University until 1992 when he became an associate professor at Kansas State University. Once at K-State, the College of Arts and Sciences awarded him with the William L. Stamey Award for Teaching in May 1995. In 2007, he became a full professor. He was named a University Distinguished Professor in 2017.

== City commission ==
Sherow ran for city commission in 2005 with the endorsement of "Citizens for a Better Manhattan", but did not enter the commission. He lost by 6 votes after the count of provisional ballots. The election focused on topics like the redevelopment of downtown Manhattan, Kansas, the rental housing inspections, and the town's aquatics center. That year, he was elected to the Board of Directors for Downtown Manhattan, Inc which he maintained until 2007.

Sherow served in the Manhattan, Kansas city commission from April 2007 until April 2013. In 2007, Sherow tied votes with challenger Jayme Morris-Hardeman for Manhattan, Kansas city commissioner seat. According to The Collegian, the student newspaper at Kansas State University, the tie was decided by a coin toss, with Sherow winning.

Sherow ran again in the 2009 elections. Sherow was one of 4 city commission candidates to support the expansion of the local transit system, ATA Bus, to include fixed routes. In a similarly controversial issue, Sherow supported the southern portion of the redevelopment of Downtown Manhattan, which included the Flint Hills Discovery Center and a conference center. Both programs were enacted subsequent the elections. In the 2009 general election, Sherow received the most votes of the commissioners in the election receiving 2,756 votes or 18.07% of the total cast ballots, giving him a four-year term.

== 2014 congressional campaign ==
=== Primary and motivations for running ===
In March 2014, Sherow began a run for the Democratic primary in order to challenge incumbent Republican Tim Huelskamp in Kansas's 1st congressional district. In the primary, he also ran against democrat Bryan Whitney of Wichita, though Whitney did not actively campaign. Sherow won the primary with a significant lead over Whitney, with 65.6% of the 12,502 primary votes. Republican, Alan LaPolice also challenged Huelskamp in the primary, gaining 45% of the Republican primary votes.

Sherow announced his initial impetus for running was that Huelskamp did not sufficiently represent Kansas in the House of Representatives; Sherow claimed Huelskamp did not sufficiently address the agricultural interests of the first district, amongst other concerns, such as encouragement of sustainable energy options. Sherow believed he would handle agricultural issues better than Huelskamp. In a September 3, 2014 interview with Salon, Sherow reinforced these motivations for running, noting the "General gridlock" in Congress. Sherow also described Huelskamp as more extreme and impractical than Governor Sam Brownback. When asked if the Huelskamp campaign was taking his challenge seriously, he responded "I think they're taking it seriously. Huelskamp doesn't want to give me any more name recognition than he needs to. So we're going to put out a challenge for debate and I’ll be very surprised if he actually accepts it. Sherow and Huelskamp did subsequently debate one another in different locations across the Big First. "

=== Endorsements and funding ===
Sherow saw considerable bi-partisan support in developing his campaign. Traditional Republicans for Common Sense— with members like Kansas politicians Steve Morris, and Ruth Teichman — endorsed him, saying that "[he] will promote practical solutions to our many problems rather than promoting a certain political 'party label.'"

Sherow endorsed independent senate candidate Greg Orman, who is running against incumbent Republican Senator Pat Roberts in the state senate election. Democratic candidate Chad Taylor soon withdrew from the race in favor of Orman. The New Republic quoted Chris Reeves, "a Kansas City Network Consultant who works with Democratic candidates" in saying that "The moment Sherow, a Democrat, said he couldn't endorse him, it was over ."

Primaries were on August 5, 2014. As of July 24, 2014, Sherow had raised $66,507 of campaign funds as compared to the incumbent Huelskamp's $648,301. The Lawrence Journal-World reported that Sherow was receiving no support from the national Democratic Party, so feels that he would not owe favors the House's Democratic caucus.

== Personal life ==
Sherow is married to Bonnie Lynn-Sherow. She is also a historian at Kansas State University, specializing in North American Indigenous and agricultural history. She was founding director of Kansas State University's Chapman Center for Rural Studies (2007-2020). The couple opened the "Daughters House Bed and Breakfast" in Manhattan in 2010, after renovating a home on the National Register of Historic Places listings for the town of Manhattan, KS. They have four daughters.

== Publications ==
Books

- The Chisholm Trail: Joseph McCoy's Great Gamble (2018)<https://themercury.com/james-sherow-university-distinguished-professor-of-history-set-to-retire-june-9/article_bc1d3e81-f474-5fd5-9b33-965a0a205660.html>
- Railroad Empire Across the Heartland with John Charlton (2014)
- Manhattan (2013) - "Images of America" series from Arcadia Publishing
- The Grasslands of the United States: An Environmental History (2007)
- A Sense of the American West: An Anthology of Environmental History (1998)
- Watering the Valley: Development along the High Plains Arkansas River, 1870-1950 (1990).

Journal articles and book chapters

- "William Allen White and 'What's the Matter with Kansas?' Once More". Online Journal of Rural Research & Policy (2). 2006. Archived from the original on 2008-08-28.
- Virgil Dean, ed. (2005). "Wes Jackson, Kansas Ecostar". John Brown to Bob Dole: Movers and Shakers in Kansas History. University Press of Kansas. pp. 317–27.
- David J. Wishart, ed. (2004). "Water". Encyclopedia of the Great Plains. University of Nebraska Press.
- "The Fellow Who Can Talk the Loudest and Has the Best Shotgun Gets the Water': Water Regulation and the Montana State Engineer's Office, 1889-1964". Montana: The Magazine of Western History (54): 56–69. Spring 2004.
- "The Art of Water and the Art of Living: Review Essay". Kansas History (25): 52–71. Spring 2002.
- Char Miller, ed. (2001). "The Decline of Agriculture in the Arkansas River Valley Was Predictable Due to the Limitations of Irrigation". Water and Environment since 1945: Global Perspectives. History in Dispute. Vol. 7. Manly Inc. pp. 11–13.
- Char Miller, ed. (2001). "Water, Sun, and Cattle: The Chisholm Trail as an Ephemeral Ecosystem". Fluid Arguments: Five Centuries of Western Water Conflict. University of Arizona Press.
- R. Douglas Hurt, ed. (1998). "Greens and Farmers: Environmentalism and Agriculture in the American West, 1945-1990". The Rural West Since World War II. University Press of Kansas.
- Coauthored w/ William S. Reeder, Jr. "A Richly Textured Community: Fort Riley, Kansas, and American Indians, 1853-1911". Kansas History. 21: 2–17. Spring 1998.
- "On the Rim of the Desert's Heart: Kansas and Water". Kansas History. 19: 2–5. Spring 1996.
- Coauthor w/ Homer Socolofsky Richard Lowitt, ed. (1995). "Kansas and Water: Survival in the Heartland". Politics in the Postwar American West. University of Oklahoma Press.
- "Agricultural Marketplace Reform: T.C. Henry and the Irrigation Crusade in Colorado, 1870-1914". Journal of the West. 31: 51–8. October 1992.
- "The Latent Influence of Equity in Wyoming v. Colorado, (1922)". Great Plains Research. 2: 7–26. February 1992.
- Sherow, James E. (Summer 1992). "Workings of the Geodialectic: High Plains Indians and Their Horses in the Region of the Arkansas River Valley, 1800-1870". Environmental History Review. 16 (2): 61–84. doi:10.2307/3984929. JSTOR 3984929. S2CID 157780008.
- "The Contest for the 'Nile of America': Kansas v. Colorado, (1907)". Great Plains Quarterly. 10: 48–61. Winter 1990.
- "The Chimerical Vision: Michael Creed Hinderlider and Progressive Engineering in Colorado". Essays and Monographs in Colorado History. 9: 37–59. 1989.
- Sherow, James E. (May 1989). "Utopia, Reality, and Irrigation: The Plight of the Fort Lyon Canal Company in the Arkansas River Valley". Western Historical Quarterly. 20 (2): 162–84. doi:10.2307/969325. JSTOR 969325.
- "Watering the Plains: An Early History of Denver's Highland Canal". Colorado Heritage. No. 4. 1988. pp. 2–13.
- "Rural Town Origins in Southwest Reno County". Kansas History. 3: 99–111. Summer 1980.
