= Douglas S. Wright =

American attorney and politician (died 2023)

Doug Wright

Mayor of Topeka, Kansas
- In office 1983–1989
- Preceded by: Hal Gerlach
- Succeeded by: Butch Felker

Personal details
- Born: c. 1948
- Died: July 27, 2023 (aged 75) Topeka, Kansas, U.S.
- Profession: Lawyer; Politician

Douglas S. Wright (c. 1948 – July 27, 2023) was an American attorney and politician who was the mayor of Topeka, Kansas and a candidate for the United States Congress. Wright, who served as Mayor of Topeka from 1983 to 1989, was the son of another former Topeka mayor, Chuck Wright, who led the city from 1965 to 1969.

== Biography ==
Wright was an assistant city attorney before defeating incumbent Mayor Bill McCormick in 1983. At the time of his election, Wright was 34 years old. He served as mayor from 1983 to 1989 and is remembered as an effective, hard working and aggressive mayor. He was a driving force behind the development of Heartland Park Topeka, the Kansas Expo Center, the Topeka Performing Arts Center and Westridge Mall. He served as a member of the Board of Directors of the National League of Cities and as President of the Governing Body of the League of Kansas Municipalities.

In 1984, Wright welcomed the Olympic Torch to the city running one kilometer with it as it made its way to Los Angeles. In 1985, the city changed its form of government from a city commission to a city council form of government. That same year, he was re-elected to the mayor's office. Wright attempted to lure the Kansas City Sizzlers to Topeka in 1986. He led the effort to return a two-hundred-year-old bell looted from a Buddhist temple during the American occupation of Japan following World War II. He also oversaw recovery efforts after a 1988 tornado that destroyed more than 20 homes and damaged 15 businesses.

Wright lost his re-election bid in 1989 to former Parks Commissioner Harry “Butch” Felker III by about 5,000 votes.

During the 1980s and 1990s, Wright rebuffed overtures from Republican officials to run for Congress against Jim Slattery. Slattery and Wright were fraternity brothers at Washburn. After the seat became open with the election of Sam Brownback to the U.S. Senate, in 1996, Wright sought the Republican nomination for the 2nd District congressional seat. He finished second in the primary to eventual winner Jim Ryun.

Throughout the 1990s, Wright practiced law. He was also the chairman of Myriad Development Corporation which attempted to build an 8,000 seat arena in Olathe, Kansas. Myriad sought about $20 million in state tax incentives but was unsuccessful. Myriad’s CEO was Greg Bair.

=== Teaching ===
After serving his sentence, he worked as a car salesman before earning a teaching certificate from Washburn University. He then completed a student teaching rotation at Highland Park High School in Topeka.

In May 2009, a committee of the Kansas Board of Education denied Wright’s application for a teaching license. Wright filed suit and a Judge Larry Hendricks ordered the Board to reconsider its decision. In December 2009, the Kansas Board of Education in a 6-4 vote upheld its decision to bar Wright from obtaining a Kansas teaching license. The Board’s decision came despite support from several including Dale Cushinberry, principal at Highland Park where Wright completed his student teaching, Matthew Herbert, the teacher who supervised his student teaching and would later go on to serve on the Lawrence City Commission and several of the professors who taught Wright when he earned his teaching certificate.

According to press reports, "The requirements to obtain a teaching license for a person with a criminal past include waiting at least five years since the conviction, finishing any probationary period and presenting evidence of rehabilitation." The Kansas Board gave no explanation of its decision.

== Personal life ==
Wright grew up in Topeka where his mother, Alice Clare (née Brownfield) Wright, was a school teacher and his father Charles W. Wright, Jr. also served as Mayor of Topeka from 1965 to 1969. He graduated from Washburn University with a degree in history and a Juris Doctor degree from Washburn Law School. He later returned to earn a teaching certificate. While an undergraduate at Washburn, Wright was a member of the Kansas Beta chapter of Phi Delta Theta. In 1985, Wright was named the Topeka Phi Delta Theta Alumni Club's "Phi of the Year."

Wright was married to Susan Kennedy Wright and together they had two children, Sara and Adam. His wife died in October 2006. He was a fourth cousin, once removed, of Democratic Vice-Presidential nominee, Tim Kaine, of Virginia.

=== Legal problems ===
In 2003, Wright was charged by Shawnee County District Attorney Robert Hecht with 47 counts of felony theft. Forty-three counts stemmed from Wright’s alleged theft of approximately $86,000 between January 1998 and February 2002 from his elderly great-aunt, Vera L. Johnson. Wright had power of attorney over Johnson’s affairs. The other four counts alleged that Wright had misappropriated approximately $3,000 from the Topeka Lawyers Club, a social club where Wright served as secretary-treasurer.

Wright was convicted of theft and fraud in connection with the affairs of his elderly great aunt. Wright served ten months in prison. The Kansas Supreme Court disbarred Wright in September 2003. The former mayor repaid his aunt with interest and in 2009 had his conviction expunged.

=== Death ===
Douglas S. Wright died in Topeka on July 27, 2023, at the age of 75.
