= Duane Pomeroy =

Kansas politician

Mayor of Topeka
- In office November 2003 – January 2004
- Preceded by: Butch Felker
- Succeeded by: James McClinton

Personal details
- Born: 1952 (age 73–74) Topeka, Kansas
- Children: 2
- Education: Washburn University
- Occupation: Teacher

Duane Pomeroy (born 1952) is a Kansas politician and teacher who served on the Topeka city council from 1993 to 2005, was deputy mayor of Topeka, Kansas under Butch Felker, and then became acting mayor from November 2003 to January 2004 after a scandal forced Felker's resignation. As a member of the council, he was barred from being selected as a replacement mayor and James McClinton was appointed to the position in December 2003 and sworn in the following month.

As a show of support for Felker, Pomeroy did not use his desk or his office during his time as acting mayor. He moved in a separate desk and moved the old desk out of the way. He also did not sit in the mayor's position during city council meetings, instead keeping his spot as the deputy mayor.

== Personal life ==
Pomeroy was born in Topeka and attended Washburn University, where he received a Bachelor's degree in political science, as well as a teaching certification. He subsequently taught government and social studies at Topeka High School, where he has been dubbed "P-Roy" by his students and athletes. He is also the head tennis coach for the Topeka High School tennis team. Pomeroy is well liked among students and staff and is well known for his witty jokes and vast collection of ties.

In 2020, Pomeroy was diagnosed with Guillain-Barré syndrome.

Pomeroy and his wife Deborah have two sons.

Preceded by Butch Felker	Mayor of Topeka, Kansas; November 2003–January 2004	Succeeded by James McClinton
