= 2014 United States House of Representatives elections in Kansas =

- November 4, 2014

All 4 Kansas seats to the United States House of Representatives
	Majority party	Minority party
Party	Republican	Democratic
Last election	4	0
Seats won	4	0
Seat change	Steady	Steady
Popular vote	540,756	311,530
Percentage	62.73%	36.14%
Swing	▼7.32%	▲17.66%

Republican
50–60%
60–70%
70–80%
80–90%
Democratic
60–70%

The 2014 United States House of Representatives elections in Kansas were held on Tuesday, November 4, 2014, to elect the four U.S. representatives from the state of Kansas, one from each of the state's four congressional districts. The elections coincided with the elections of other federal and state offices, including the 2014 Kansas gubernatorial election.

== Overview ==
United States House of Representatives elections in Kansas, 2014
Party	Votes	Percentage	Seats	+/–
Republican	540,756	62.73%	4	-
Democratic	311,530	36.14%	0	-
Libertarian	9,791	1.14%	0	-
Totals	862,077	100.00%	4	—

=== By district ===
Results of the 2014 United States House of Representatives elections in Kansas by district:

District	Republican		Democratic		Others		Total		Result
District	Votes	%	Votes	%	Votes	%	Votes	%	Result
District 1	138,764	67.97%	65,397	32.03%	0	0.00%	204,161	100%	Republican hold
District 2	128,742	57.05%	87,153	38.62%	9,791	4.34%	225,686	100%	Republican hold
District 3	134,493	60.02%	89,584	39.98%	0	2.52%	224,077	100%	Republican hold
District 4	138,757	66.66%	69,396	33.34%	0	0.00%	208,153	100%	Republican hold
Total	540,756	62.73%	311,530	36.14%	9,791	1.13%	862,077	100%	

== District 1 ==
2014 Kansas's 1st congressional district election
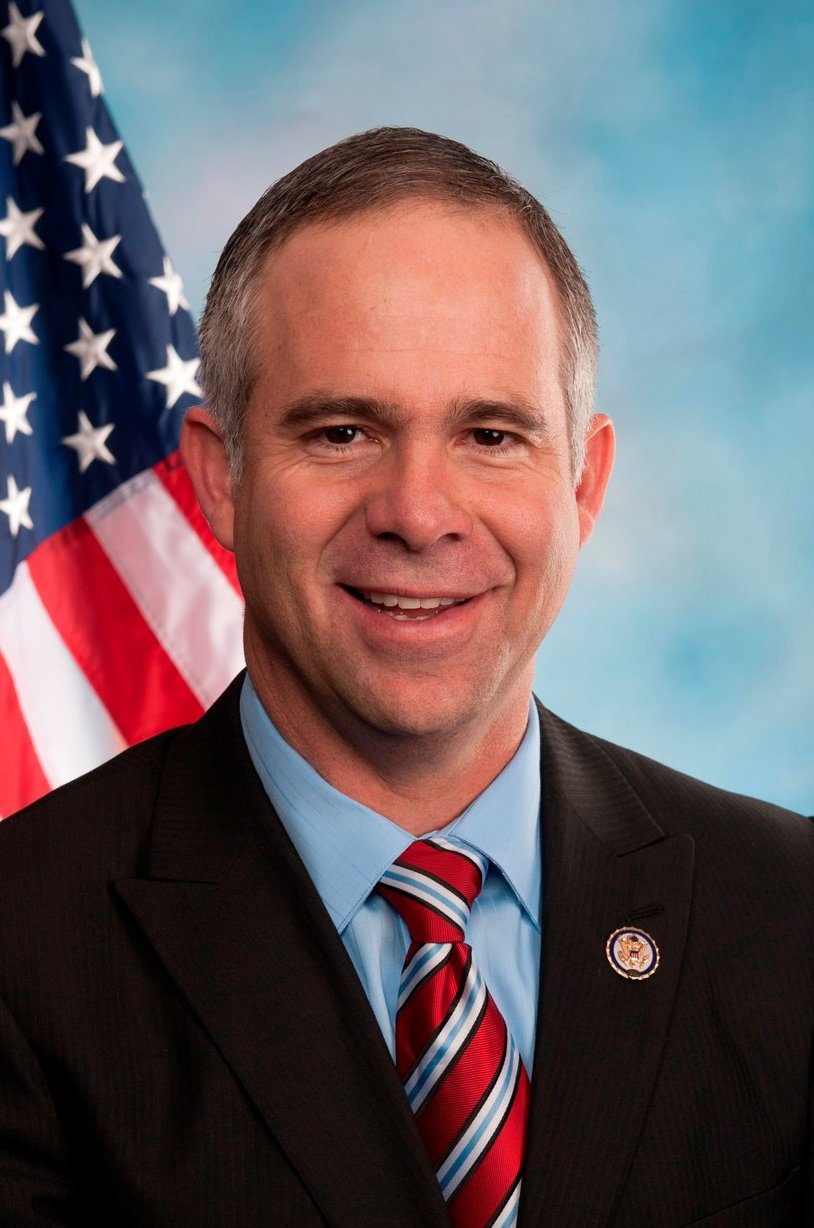

Nominee	Tim Huelskamp	Jim Sherow
Party	Republican	Democratic
Popular vote	138,764	65,397
Percentage	68.0%	32.0%
- County results Huelskamp: 50–60% 60–70% 70–80% 80–90%
U.S. Representative before election
Tim Huelskamp
Republican
Elected U.S. Representative
Tim Huelskamp
Republican

Republican Tim Huelskamp had represented the district since being elected in 2010. He was re-elected in 2012 with 100% of the vote, as no candidate filed to run against him.

Alan LaPolice, a former school administrator, lost against incumbent Huelskamp in the Republican primary.

Jim Sherow, city co-commissioner and former mayor of Manhattan, successfully received the Democratic nomination, defeating Bryan Whitney, a member of the 2013 class of Wichita State University who hardly campaigned.

Unlike the other three congressional districts in Kansas, none of the candidates received endorsements from the local Kansas Farm Bureau and Kansas Livestock Association. The president of the Farm Bureau described this inability to endorse candidates as "reflect[ing] views at the grassroots level."

=== Republican primary ===
==== Candidates ====
===== Nominee =====
- Tim Huelskamp, incumbent U.S. representative

===== Eliminated in primary =====
- Alan LaPolice, former school administrator

===== Withdrawn =====
- Kent Roth, attorney and former state representative

==== Endorsements ====
Tim Huelskamp

Organizations

- FreedomWorks

==== Polling ====
Poll source	Date(s) administered	Sample size	Margin of error	Tim Huelskamp	Alan LaPolice	Undecided
Remington Research Group	July 29, 2014	1,539	± 3.7%	50%	29%	21%
The Polling Company (R-Huelskamp)	June 2014	400	± 4.2%	62%	12%	26%

- ^ Poll for the Tim Huelskamp campaign

==== Results ====
2014 Republican primary results by county Huelskamp: 50–60%; 60–70%; 70–80%; LaPolice: 50–60%; 60–70%

Republican primary results
Party	Candidate	Votes	%
Republican	Tim Huelskamp (incumbent)	42,847	55.0
Republican	Alan LaPolice	35,108	45.0
Total votes		77,955	100.0

=== Democratic primary ===
==== Candidates ====
===== Nominee =====
- Jim Sherow, history professor at Kansas State University and former mayor of Manhattan

===== Eliminated in primary =====
- Bryan Whitney, college student

==== Results ====
Democratic primary results
Party	Candidate	Votes	%
Democratic	Jim Sherow	8,209	65.6
Democratic	Bryan R. Whitney	4,293	34.4
Total votes		12,502	100.0

=== General election ===
==== Endorsements ====
Tim Huelskamp (R)

Organizations

- Eagle Forum
- FreedomWorks
- National Federation of Independent Business
- National Rifle Association - Political Victory Fund
- National Right to Life Committee
- Republican Liberty Caucus
- Tea Party Express
Jim Sherow (D)

Organizations

- Sierra Club

==== Polling ====
Poll source	Date(s) administered	Sample size	Margin of error	Tim Huelskamp	Jim Sherow	Undecided
Jayhawk Consulting Services (D-Sherow)	October 25–26, 2014	400	± 4%	38%	45%	17%
New York Times/CBS News Battleground Tracker	October 16–23, 2014	352	± 10%	54%	24%	23%

==== Predictions ====
Source	Ranking	As of
The Cook Political Report	Safe R	November 3, 2014
Rothenberg	Safe R	October 24, 2014
Sabato's Crystal Ball	Safe R	October 30, 2014
RCP	Safe R	November 2, 2014
Daily Kos Elections	Safe R	November 4, 2014

==== Results ====
Kansas's 1st congressional district, 2014
Party	Candidate	Votes	%
Republican	Tim Huelskamp (incumbent)	138,764	68.0
Democratic	Jim Sherow	65,397	32.0
Total votes		204,161	100.0
Republican hold			

== District 2 ==
2014 Kansas's 2nd congressional district election
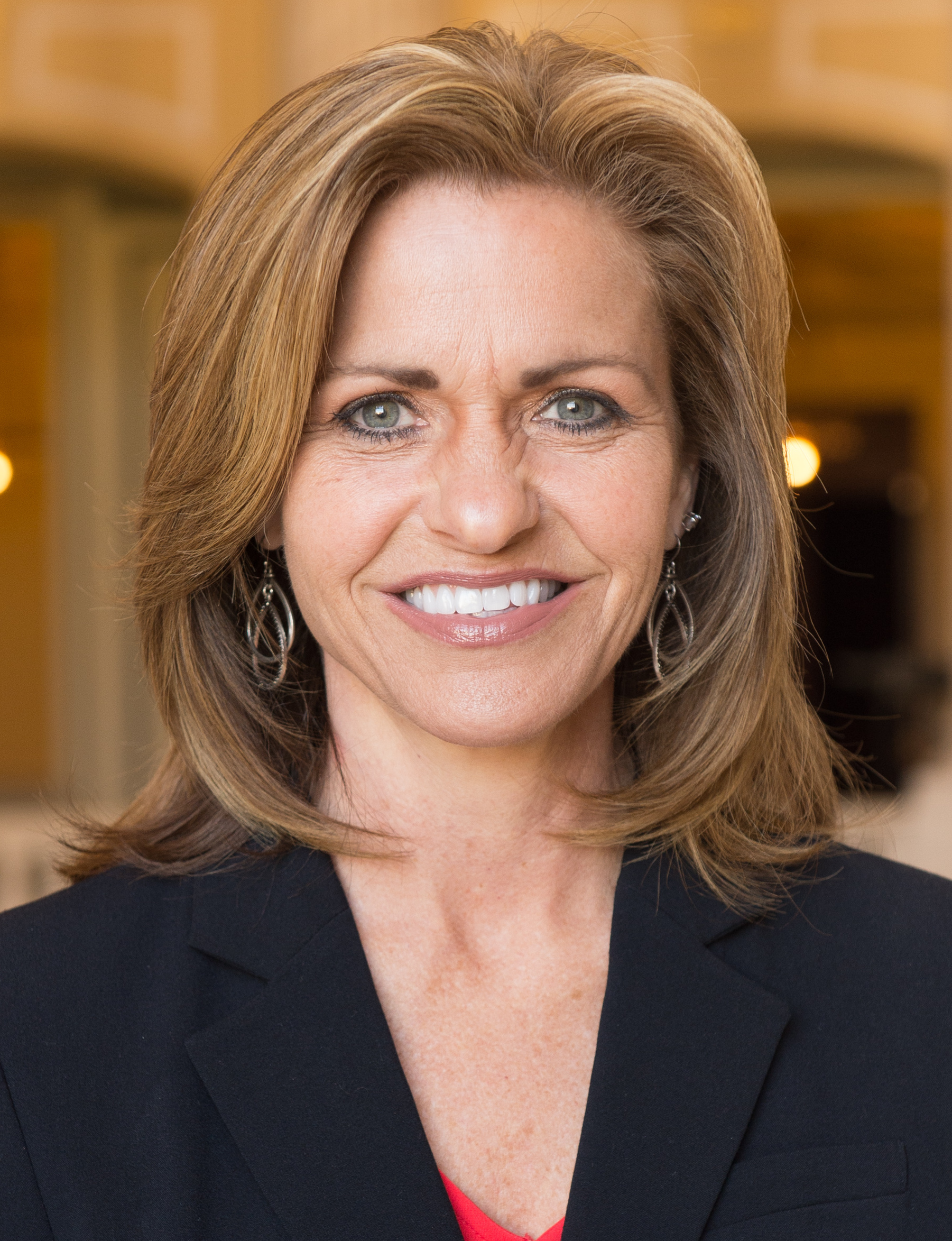

Nominee	Lynn Jenkins	Margie Wakefield
Party	Republican	Democratic
Popular vote	128,742	87,153
Percentage	57.0%	38.6%
- County results Jenkins: 50–60% 60–70% 70–80% Wakefield: 60–70%
U.S. Representative before election
Lynn Jenkins
Republican
Elected U.S. Representative
Lynn Jenkins
Republican

Republican Lynn Jenkins had represented the district since being elected in 2008.

Family law attorney Margie Wakefield ran for the Democratic nomination. 6th grade life science teacher Chris Clemmons ran as a Libertarian.

=== Republican primary ===
==== Candidates ====
===== Nominee =====
- Lynn Jenkins, incumbent U.S. representative

===== Eliminated in primary =====
- Joshua Joel Tucker, computer systems analyst and conservative activist

==== Results ====
Republican primary results
Party	Candidate	Votes	%
Republican	Lynn Jenkins (incumbent)	41,850	69.1
Republican	Joshua Joel Tucker	18,680	30.8
Total votes		60,530	100.0

=== Democratic primary ===
==== Candidates ====
===== Nominee =====
- Margie Wakefield, former congressional aide, Douglas County Democratic chair, and attorney

=== Libertarian primary ===
==== Candidates ====
===== Nominee =====
- Chris Clemmons

=== General election ===
==== Endorsements ====
Lynn Jenkins (R)

Organizations

- National Federation of Independent Business
- National Rifle Association - Political Victory Fund
- National Right to Life Committee
- No Labels
Margie Wakefield (D)

Labor unions

- AFL-CIO

Organizations

- EMILY's List
- Sierra Club

==== Polling ====
Poll source	Date(s) administered	Sample size	Margin of error	Lynn Jenkins (R)	Margie Wakefield (D)	Chris Clemmons (L)	Undecided
New York Times/CBS News Battleground Tracker	October 16–23, 2014	496	± 7%	45%	38%	—	17%
Tarrance Group (R-Jenkins)	October 18–20, 2014	400	± 4.9%	49%	37%	6%	8%
Anzalone Liszt Grove (D-Wakefield)	October 3–6, 2014	400	± 4.9%	48%	43%	—	9%
Anzalone Liszt Grove (D-Wakefield)	July 20–22, 2014	400	± 4.9%	49%	42%	—	9%
Anzalone Liszt Grove (D-Wakefield)	October 7–9, 2013	400	± 4.9%	49%	39%	—	12%

==== Predictions ====
Source	Ranking	As of
The Cook Political Report	Likely R	November 3, 2014
Rothenberg	Likely R	October 24, 2014
Sabato's Crystal Ball	Safe R	October 30, 2014
RCP	Likely R	November 2, 2014
Daily Kos Elections	Likely R	November 4, 2014

==== Results ====
Kansas's 2nd congressional district, 2014
Party	Candidate	Votes	%
Republican	Lynn Jenkins (incumbent)	128,742	57.0
Democratic	Margie Wakefield	87,153	38.6
Libertarian	Christopher Clemmons	9,791	4.4
Total votes		225,686	100.0
Republican hold			

== District 3 ==
2014 Kansas's 3rd congressional district election
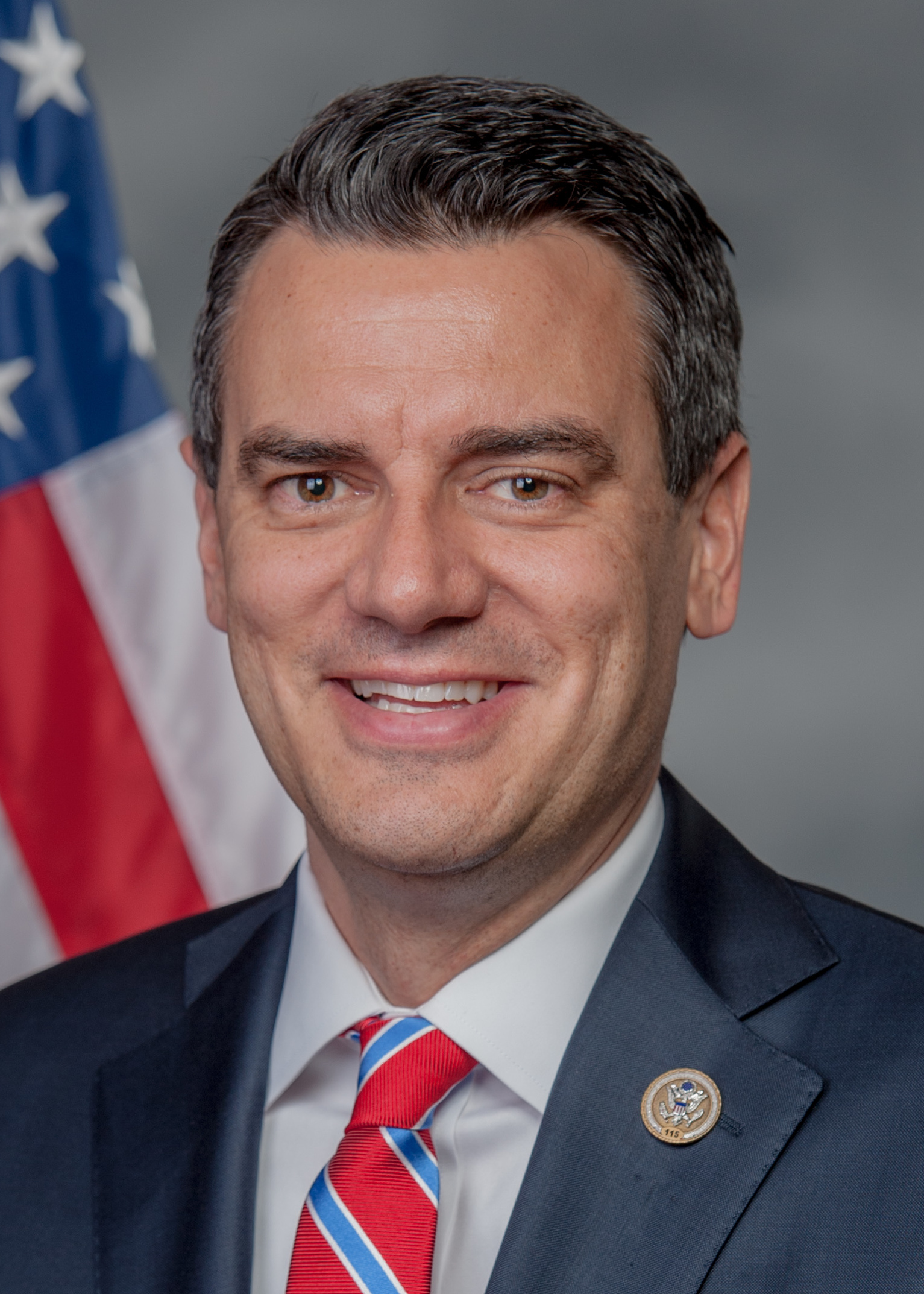

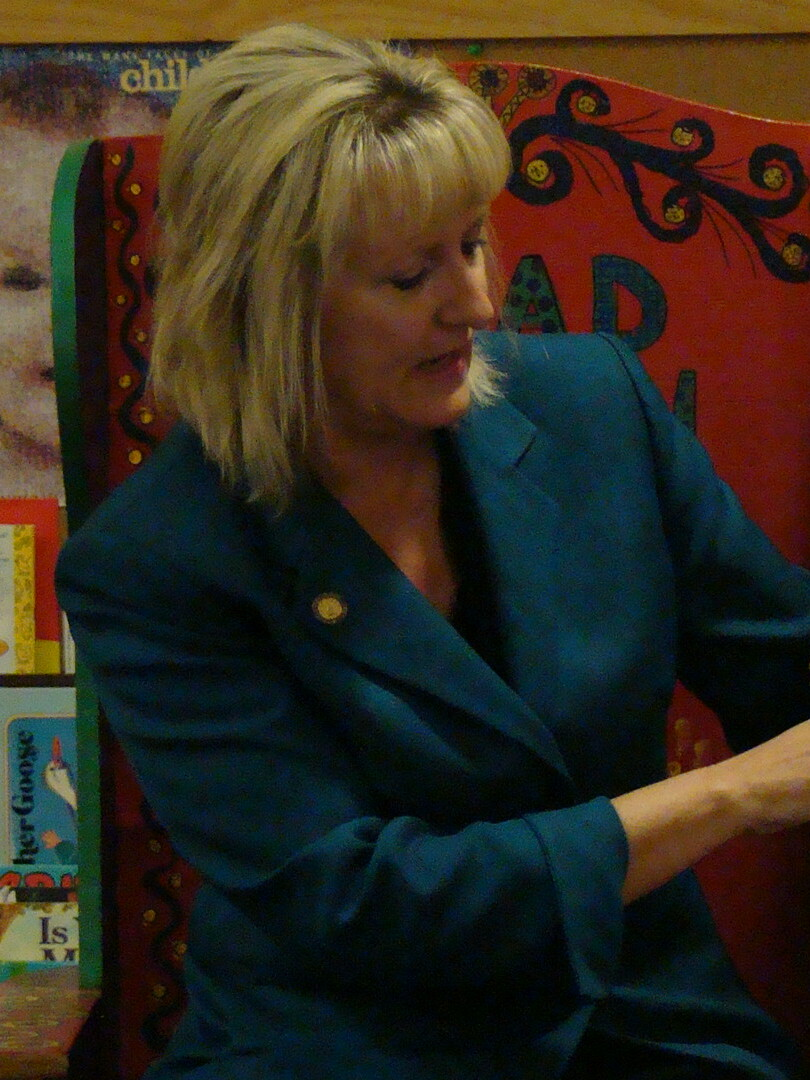
Nominee	Kevin Yoder	Kelly Kultala
Party	Republican	Democratic
Popular vote	134,493	89,584
Percentage	60.0%	40.0%
- County results Yoder: 60–70% 70–80% Kultala: 60–70%
U.S. Representative before election
Kevin Yoder
Republican
Elected U.S. Representative
Kevin Yoder
Republican

Republican Kevin Yoder had represented the district since being elected in 2010.

Former state senator Kelly Kultala ran for the Democrats.

=== Republican primary ===
==== Candidates ====
===== Nominee =====
- Kevin Yoder, incumbent U.S. representative

=== Democratic primary ===
==== Candidates ====
===== Nominee =====
- Kelly Kultala, former state senator and nominee for lieutenant governor in 2010

===== Eliminated in primary =====
- Reggie Marselus, retired union official

==== Results ====
Democratic primary results
Party	Candidate	Votes	%
Democratic	Kelly Kultala	14,189	68.6
Democratic	Reginald "Reggie" Marselus	6,524	31.4
Total votes		20,713	100.0

=== General election ===
==== Endorsements ====
Kevin Yoder (R)

Labor unions

- National Association of Letter Carriers

Organizations

- National Federation of Independent Business
- National Rifle Association - Political Victory Fund
- National Right to Life Committee
Kelly Kultala (D)

Labor unions

- AFL-CIO

Organizations

- Sierra Club

==== Polling ====
Poll source	Date(s) administered	Sample size	Margin of error	Kevin Yoder (R)	Kelly Kultala (D)	Undecided
New York Times/CBS News Battleground Tracker	October 16–23, 2014	725	± 6%	48%	37%	15%
Lake Research (D-Kultala)	May 12–15, 2014	400	± 4.9%	42%	34%	16%

==== Predictions ====
Source	Ranking	As of
The Cook Political Report	Likely R	November 3, 2014
Rothenberg	Safe R	October 24, 2014
Sabato's Crystal Ball	Safe R	October 30, 2014
RCP	Likely R	November 2, 2014
Daily Kos Elections	Likely R	November 4, 2014

==== Results ====
Kansas's 3rd congressional district, 2014
Party	Candidate	Votes	%
Republican	Kevin Yoder (incumbent)	134,493	60.0
Democratic	Kelly Kultala	89,584	40.0
Total votes		224,077	100.0
Republican hold			

== District 4 ==
2014 Kansas's 4th congressional district election
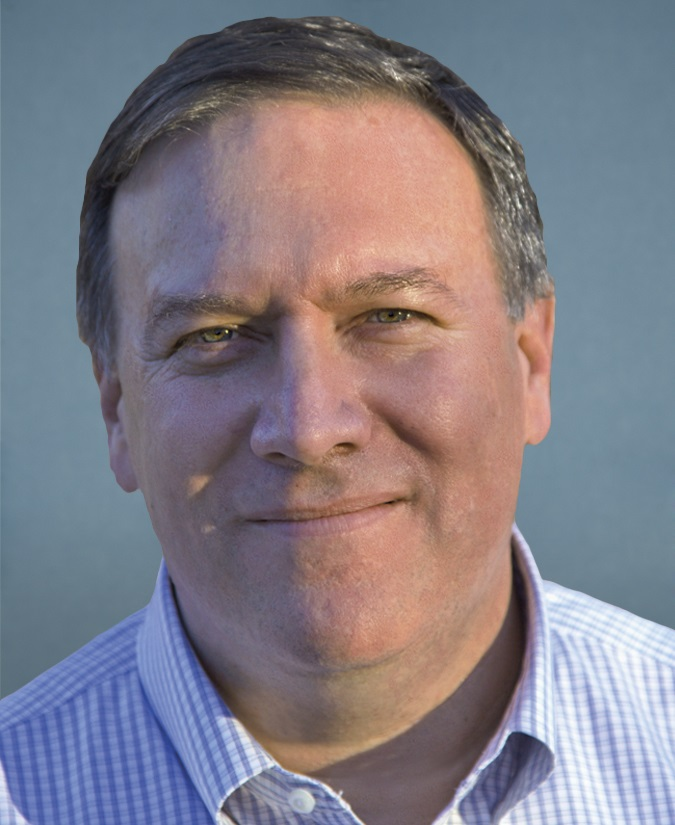

Nominee	Mike Pompeo	Perry Schuckman
Party	Republican	Democratic
Popular vote	138,757	69,396
Percentage	66.7%	33.3%
- County results Pompeo: 60–70% 70–80% 80–90%
U.S. Representative before election
Mike Pompeo
Republican
Elected U.S. Representative
Mike Pompeo
Republican

Republican Mike Pompeo had represented the district since being elected in 2010. Former Congressman Todd Tiahrt, who represented the district from 1995 until he gave up the seat in 2010 to unsuccessfully run for the U.S. Senate, challenged Pompeo in the Republican primary.

=== Republican primary ===
==== Candidates ====
===== Nominee =====
- Mike Pompeo, incumbent U.S. representative

===== Eliminated in primary =====
- Todd Tiahrt, former U.S. representative and candidate for Senate in 2010

==== Polling ====
Poll source	Date(s) administered	Sample size	Margin of error	Mike Pompeo	Todd Tiahrt	Undecided
CMA Strategies (R-Pompeo)	July 21–23, 2014	400	± 4.9%	45%	26%	29%
SurveyUSA	July 17–21, 2014	671	± 3.9%	46%	39%	16%
SurveyUSA	June 16–18, 2014	534	± 4.3%	51%	34%	16%

==== Results ====
Republican primary results
Party	Candidate	Votes	%
Republican	Mike Pompeo (incumbent)	43,564	62.6
Republican	Todd Tiahrt	25,977	37.4
Total votes		69,541	100.0

=== Democratic primary ===
==== Candidates ====
===== Nominee =====
- Perry Schuckman

===== Declined =====
- Robert Tillman, retired court officer, Kansas National Guard veteran, candidate for this seat in 2010 and nominee in 2012

=== General election ===
==== Endorsements ====
Mike Pompeo (R)

Organizations

- Club for Growth
- National Federation of Independent Business
- National Rifle Association - Political Victory Fund
- National Right to Life Committee

==== Polling ====
Poll source	Date(s) administered	Sample size	Margin of error	Mike Pompeo (R)	Perry Schuckman (D)	Undecided
New York Times/CBS News Battleground Tracker	October 16–23, 2014	400	± 9%	48%	28%	24%

==== Predictions ====
Source	Ranking	As of
The Cook Political Report	Safe R	November 3, 2014
Rothenberg	Safe R	October 24, 2014
Sabato's Crystal Ball	Safe R	October 30, 2014
RCP	Safe R	November 2, 2014
Daily Kos Elections	Safe R	November 4, 2014

==== Results ====
Kansas's 4th congressional district, 2014
Party	Candidate	Votes	%
Republican	Mike Pompeo (incumbent)	138,757	66.7
Democratic	Perry Schuckman	69,396	33.3
Total votes		208,153	100.0
Republican hold			
