= Larry Wolgast =

American politician

Mayor of Topeka
- In office April 9, 2013 – January 8, 2018
- Preceded by: Bill Bunten
- Succeeded by: Michelle De La Isla

Member of the Topeka City Council
- In office April 2009 – April 2013

Kansas Secretary of Human Resources
- In office 1979–1987
- Governor: John W. Carlin

Personal details
- Born: August 28, 1940 (age 86)
- Party: Democratic
- Spouse: Anita Wolgast
- Children: 2
- Education: Kansas State University; University of Kansas

Larry E. Wolgast is an American politician who served as Mayor of Topeka, Kansas from 2013 to 2018. He previously served as Kansas Secretary of Human Resources during the administration of Governor John W. Carlin.

== Early life and career ==
Wolgast was raised in Wabaunsee County, Kansas. He has an undergraduate degree from Kansas State University and a master's and doctorate degree from the University of Kansas.

He was the administrative assistant to Congressman Bill Roy and a cabinet secretary in the administration of Governor John Carlin. Wolgast served in administrative positions at United Way of Topeka, National Education Association of Kansas, and as a teacher and administrator in Topeka Public Schools. He has also served on boards at the local, state and national level, including the YMCA of Topeka, Topeka Shawnee County Landmarks Commission, Topeka Symphony and Topeka Performing Arts Center. Larry retired as Vice President of Development for the Menninger Foundation, but is still active in community service and continues to serve as a consultant for non-profit organizations.

Larry is married to Anita Wolgast, who is currently the co-chair of NOTO. They have two sons and five grandchildren. He enjoys climbing mountains in Colorado and has completed 3 marathons.

== Mayoral career ==
Larry Wolgast was elected Mayor of Topeka in April 2013, having previously served on the Topeka City Council between 2009 and 2013.

He was succeeded as mayor in 2018 by deputy mayor Michelle De La Isla.

Political offices
Preceded by Bill Bunten	Mayor of Topeka, Kansas; 2013–2018	Succeeded by Michelle De La Isla
