= Kansas Department of Revenue =

State agency in Kansas, United States

Department overview
- Jurisdiction: Kansas
- Headquarters: 915 S.W. Harrison Street; Topeka, Kansas
- Department executive: Mark Burghart, Secretary of Revenue
- Website: www.ksrevenue.gov

The Kansas Department of Revenue (KDOR) is a cabinet-level department of the state government of Kansas. It is headquartered in the state capital of Topeka. The KDOR is responsible for the collection of taxes as well as valuing property, and the wholesale distribution of alcoholic beverages and enforcement of liquor laws. Also the department oversees the administration of motor vehicle registrations, issues motor vehicle and trailer titles, maintains vehicle title and registration records, licenses and monitors Kansas vehicle dealers.

Logo used until the 2010s.
