= Mike Padilla =

American politician

Mayor of Topeka
- In office January 4, 2022 – January 6, 2026
- Preceded by: Michelle De La Isla
- Succeeded by: Spencer Duncan

Personal details
- Born: 1948 or 1949 (age 76–77) Topeka, Kansas, U.S.
- Party: Democratic
- Education: Washburn University (BA)

Michael Padilla (born 1948/1949) is an American politician who served as the mayor of Topeka, Kansas from 2022 to 2026. Prior to becoming mayor, Padilla was a member of the Topeka Police Department for 33 years and served one term on Topeka's city council.

== Career ==
Padilla is a second-generation Mexican American. He graduated from Hayden High School and Washburn University. He worked for Adams Business Forms but left the job in 1970 to become a police officer for Topeka's police department.

In 2000, Padilla, then a police captain, ran for sheriff of Shawnee County as a Democrat. He won the Democratic Party's primary election in August, but lost the November general election to the incumbent, Republican Richard Barta. Padilla retired from the Topeka Police Department in 2003 at the rank of major.

Padilla was elected to Topeka's city council to represent District 5 in 2017. In January 2021, the members of the Topeka City Council elected Padilla as deputy mayor. After mayor Michelle De La Isla decided not to run for reelection in 2021, Padilla announced his candidacy for mayor. Padilla defeated Leo Cangiani in the non-partisan election with 60.9% of the vote (9,209 to 5,862) on November 2. He was sworn in as mayor on January 4, 2022. Padilla chose not to seek re-election to a second term.

Political offices
Preceded by Michelle De La Isla	Mayor of Topeka; 2022–2026	Succeeded by Spencer Duncan
