= North Kansas Avenue Bridge =

- Coordinates: 39.0623°N 95.6682°W
- Carries: Pedestrians, motor vehicles
- Crosses: Kansas River
- Locale: Downtown Topeka, Kansas

Characteristics
- Design: Unknown
- No. of lanes: 4

History
- Construction start: 1965
- Construction end: 1967

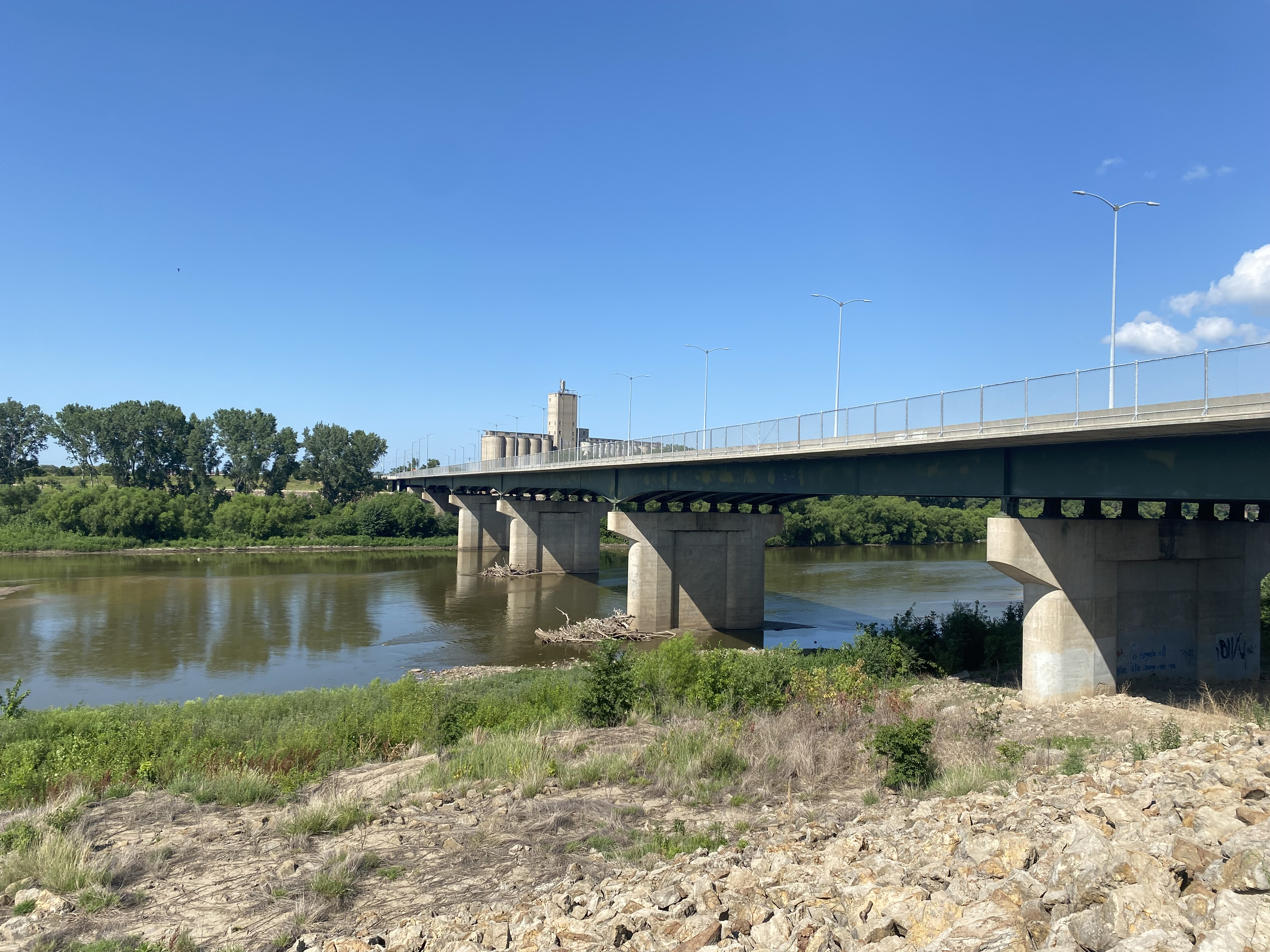
North Kansas Avenue Bridge on the Kansas River in Topeka, Kansas, facing northeast

The North Kansas Avenue Bridge is a four lane, automobile and pedestrian crossing of the Kansas River at Topeka, Kansas, U.S. The bridge connects downtown Topeka to North Topeka. It is open to traffic.

The North Kansas Avenue Bridge opened in 1967. It replaced the Melan Arch Bridge, which had collapsed two years prior on July 2, 1965, killing one motorist. The Melan Arch Bridge opened in 1898 and was the only bridge to North Topeka until 1938.

Unlike the Melan Arch Bridge, the North Topeka side of the North Kansas Avenue Bridge does not connect directly with Kansas Avenue; it instead leads to N.E. Quincy St. This caused traffic to bypass the North Topeka business district on Kansas Avenue, which local merchants claim led to the decline of the business district. A fly-off ramp known as the "Curtis Flyoff" was built in 2004 to connect the bridge to the Kansas Avenue business district and Great Overland Station.
