= Elizabeth Wolgast =

American writer and philosopher (1929–2020)

- Born: February 27, 1929; Dunellen, New Jersey, US
- Died: October 13, 2020 (aged 91); California, US

Education
- Education: Cornell University; University of Washington

Philosophical work
- Region: Western philosophy
- Institutions: University of California, Berkeley; University of California, Davis; San Francisco State University; California State University, East Bay
- Main interests: Ethics; Epistemology; Feminist Philosophy; Political Philosophy

Elizabeth Hankins Wolgast (February 27, 1929 – October 13, 2020) was an American philosopher. Wolgast was born in New Jersey. She died following complications from a stroke.

== Education ==
Wolgast graduated from Cornell University in 1952, studying modern literature at both undergraduate and masters level. She then moved to the University of Washington, where she completed her PhD, focusing on skepticism.

== Work ==
Across her career, Wolgast taught and researched at a number of universities. In 1968, Wolgast was appointed to a teaching post at the Department of Philosophy at California State College at Hayward (now California State University, East Bay). She was later appointed an emeritus professor at the institution. Wolgast's work focused on liberal feminism, contemporary political philosophy, ethics and epistemology.

== Bibliography ==
=== Books ===
- Ethics of an Artificial Person: Lost Responsibility in Professions and Organizations. Redwood City: Stanford University Press. 1992. ISBN 978-0-8047-2103-5.
- The Grammar of Justice. Ithaca: Cornell University Press. 1987. ISBN 978-0-8014-2081-8.
- Equality and the Rights of Women. Ithaca: Cornell University Press. 1980. ISBN 978-0-8014-1211-0.
- Paradoxes of Knowledge. Ithaca: Cornell University Press. 1977. ISBN 978-0-8014-1090-1.

=== Articles (selection) ===
- "Do Husbands or Wives Make the Purchasing Decisions?", Journal of Marketing, 1958, Vol. 23, No. 2: 51-158.
- "The Experience in Perceptien", The Philosophical Review, 1960, Vol. 69, No. 2: 165-182.
- "Perceiving and Impressions", The Philosophical Review, 1962, Vol. 67, No. 2: 226-236.
- "Qualities and Illusions", Mind, 1962, Vol. 71: 458-473.
- "A Question about Colors", The Philosophical Review, 1962, Vol. 71, No.3.: 328-339.
- "Wittgenstein and criteria", Inquiry, 1964, Vol. 71: 348–366.
- "Knowing and What it Implies", The Philosophical Review, 1971, Vol. 80, No. 3.: 360-370.
- "The Invisible Paw", The Monist, 1984, Vol. 67, No. 2: 229-250.
- "Intolerable Wrong and Punishment", Philosophy, 1985, Vol. 60, No. 232: 161-174.
- "Whether Certainty is a Form of Life", Philosophical Quarterly, 1987, Vol. 37, No. 147: 151-165.
- "Wrong Rights", Hypatia, 1987, Vol. 2, No. 1: 25-43.
- "Moral Pluralism", Journal of Social Philosophy, 1990, Vol.23, No. 2-3: 108-116.
- "The Virtue of a Representative", Social Theory and Practice, 1991, Vol. 17, No. 2: 273-293.
- "Innocence", Philosophy, 1993, Vol. 68, No. 265: 297-307.
- "Primitive Reactions", Philosophical Investigations, 1994, Vol 17: 587-603.
- "The Demands of Public Reason", Columbia Law Review, 1994, Vol. 94: 1936-1949.
- "Moral Paradigms", Philosophy, 1995, Vol. 70, No. 272: 143-155
- "Mental Causes and the Will", Philosophical Investigations, 2002, Vol. 21: 24-43.
- "A Religious Point of View", Philosophical Investigations, 2004, Vol. 27: 129-147.
