= Mayor of Topeka, Kansas =

Head executive of the Topeka government

Mayor of Topeka
- Incumbent; Spencer Duncan since January 6, 2026
- Inaugural holder: Loring Farnsworth
- Formation: 19th Century
- Website: topeka.gov/government/mayor/

== List of mayors ==
The following is a list of mayors of the American city of Topeka, Kansas.

Image	Mayor	Years of service
	Loring Farnsworth	1858–1859
	Lorenzo Dow	March – June 2, 1859
	Cyrus K. Holliday	1859–1860
☢	Hiram W. Farnsworth	1860–1861
	Harris F. Otis	1861–1862
	Noah W. Cox	1862–1863
	Joseph F. Cummings	1863–1864
	Samuel H. Fletcher	1864–1865
	William W. Ross	1865–1866
	Ross Burns	1866–1867
	Cyrus K. Holliday	1867–1868
	Orrin T. Welch	1868–1869
	Cyrus K. Holliday	1869–1870
	Josiah B. McAfee	1870–1871
	Orrin T. Welch	1871–1873
	Henry Bartling	1873–1875
	Thomas J. Anderson	1875–1877
	Milton H. Case	1877–1881
	Joseph C. Wilson	1881–1883
	Michael Heery	1883
	Bradford Miller	1883–1885
	Roswell L. Cofran	1885–1887
	David C. Metsker	1887–1889
	Roswell L. Cofran	1889–1893
	Daniel C. Jones	1893
	Thomas W. Harrison	1893–1895
	Charles A. Fellows	1895–1899
	Charles J. Drew	1899–1901
	James W. F. Hughes	1901–1902
	Albert Parker	1902–1903
	William S. Bergundthal	1903–1905
	William H. Davis	1905–1907
	William Green	1907–1910
	Julius B. Billard	1910–1913
	Roswell L. Cofran	1913–1915
	Jay E. House	1915–1919
	Herbert J. Corwine	1919–1923
	Earl Akers	1923–1925
	James E. Thomas	1925–1927
	William O. Rigby	1927–1931
	Omar B. Ketchum	1931–1935
	Herbert G. Barrett	1935–1939
	John F. Scott	1939–1941
	Frank J. Warren	1941–1951
	W. Kenneth Wilke	1951–1953
	George C. Schnellbacher	1953–1959
	Ed J. Camp	1959–1963
	Hal W. Gerlach	1963–1965
	Chuck Wright	1965–1969
	Gene C. Martin	1969–1971
	William B. McCormick	1971–1983
	Douglas S. Wright	1983–1989
	Butch Felker	1989–1997
	Joan Wagnon	1997–2001
	Butch Felker	2001–2003
	Duane Pomeroy	2003–2004
	James McClinton	2004–2005
	Bill Bunten	2005–2013
	Larry Wolgast	2013–2018
	Michelle De La Isla	2018–2022
	Mike Padilla	2022–2026
	Spencer Duncan	2026–present

== See also ==
- List of people from Topeka, Kansas
- Timeline of Topeka, Kansas
