= Senator Lee =

Senator Lee may refer to:

== Members of the United States Senate ==
- Blair Lee I (1857–1944), U.S. Senator from Maryland from 1914 to 1917
- Joshua B. Lee (1892–1967), U.S. Senator from Oklahoma 1937 to 1943
- Mike Lee (born 1971), U.S. Senator from Utah since 2011
- Richard Henry Lee (1732–1794), U.S. Senator from Virginia from 1789 to 1792

== United States state senate members ==
- Abby Lee (politician) (born 1970s), Idaho State Senate
- Barbara Lee (born 1946), California State Senate
- Blair Lee III (1916–1985), Maryland State Senate
- Dorothy McCullough Lee (1901–1981), Oregon State Senate
- Ezell Lee (1938–2012), Mississippi State Senate
- Francis D. Lee (Nebraska politician) (1911–1980), Nebraska State Senate
- Francis Lightfoot Lee (1734–1797), Virginia State Senate
- Gary Lee (politician) (born 1947), North Dakota State Senate
- Gordon Lee (congressman) (1859–1927), Georgia State Senate
- Howard Nathaniel Lee (born 1934), North Carolina State Senate
- Janis Lee (fl. 1990s–2010s), Kansas State Senate
- John Jay Lee (born 1955), Nevada State Senate
- John Lee (Maryland politician) (1788–1871), Maryland State Senate
- Judy Lee (born 1942), North Dakota State Senate
- Lawrence J. Lee (1932–1991), Missouri State Senate
- M. Lindley Lee (1805–1876), New York State Senate
- Martin Lee (New York politician), New York State Senate
- Michael V. Lee (born 1968), North Carolina State Senate
- Mordecai Lee (born 1948), Wisconsin State Senate
- Oliver Lee (New Mexico gunfighter) (1865–1941), New Mexico State Senate
- Pete Lee (born 1947), Colorado State Senate
- Stephen D. Lee (1833–1908), Mississippi State Senate
- Susan C. Lee (born 1954), Maryland State Senate
- Tom Lee (Florida politician) (born 1962), Florida State Senate
- William H. Lee (New York politician) (1876–1954), New York State Senate
- William Henry Fitzhugh Lee (1837–1891), Virginia State Senate

== Other ==
- Regine Biscoe Lee (born 1981), Senate of Guam

== See also ==
- Senator Lea (disambiguation)
- Senator Lees (disambiguation)
