= Neil Arasmith =

American politician

Member of the Kansas Senate from the 36th district
- In office 1973 – January 9, 1989
- Succeeded by: Janis Lee

Personal details
- Born: February 23, 1930 Jewell, Kansas, U.S.
- Died: September 26, 2010 Topeka, Kansas, U.S.
- Party: Republican
- Spouse: Donna Schindler (m. 1951)
- Children: 3

Neil Harvey Arasmith (February 23, 1930–September 26, 2010) was an American politician who served as a Republican in the Kansas State Senate from 1973 to 1989.

== Early life and education ==
He received a bachelor of arts from the University of Kansas in 1951. He served in the U.S. Air Force and was a second lieutenant. After serving in the air force, he then worked for Mason Investment Company in Salina.
