= Janice Lee =

Janice Lee may refer to:

- Janice Y. K. Lee, American author
- Lee Ying Ha, Malaysian politician

== See also ==
- Janice Romary (full name Janice-Lee York Romary), American foil fencer
- Janis Lee (born 1945), Kansas state senator
