= Alpha Brumage =

American football player and sports coach (1880–1963)

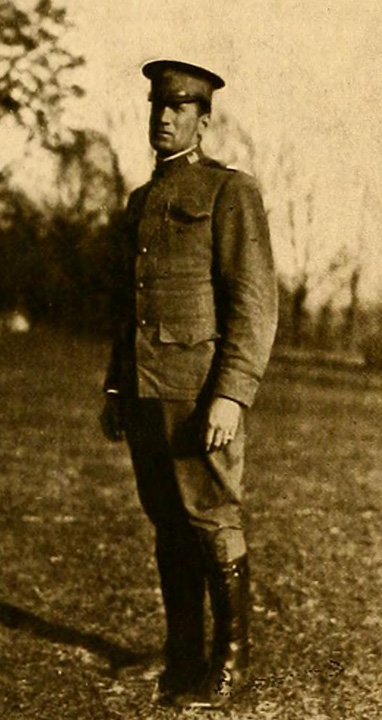
- Brumage pictured in The Bomb 1913, VMI yearbook

Biographical details
- Born: March 16, 1880; Mitchell County, Kansas, U.S.
- Died: March 11, 1963 (aged 82); San Antonio, Texas, U.S.

Playing career

Football
- 1901–1903: Kansas
- Position: Fullback

Coaching career (HC unless noted)

Football
- 1904–1907: Ottawa (KS)
- 1908–1909: William Jewell
- 1910: Nebraska State Normal
- 1911–1912: VMI
- 1913–1914: Kentucky

Basketball
- 1908–1910: William Jewell
- 1911–1913: VMI
- 1913–1915: Kentucky
- 1915–?: Birmingham A. C.

Baseball
- 1909–1910: William Jewell
- 1914–1915: Kentucky

Administrative career (AD unless noted)
- 1911–1913: VMI

Head coaching record
- Overall: 51–29–3 (football); 49–26 (basketball); 34–24–1 (baseball)

Alpha Brumage (March 16, 1880 – March 11, 1963) was an American football player and coach of football, basketball, and baseball.

== Early life and playing career ==
Brumage was a native of Beloit, Kansas and graduated from Beloit High School. He attended the University of Kansas, where he played college football from 1901 to 1903 as a fullback and captained the 1903 Kansas Jayhawks football team. Brumage also participated in track and field as Kansas, running the hurdles in 1902–03.

== Coaching career ==
=== Ottawa (KS) ===
Brumage was the head football at Ottawa University in Ottawa, Kansas for four seasons, from 1904 to 1907 compiling a record of 14–16–1. Brumage took over the team after a one-year hiatus because the school was attempting to purge professionalism from their college sports teams.

=== VMI ===
After coaching at William Jewell College in Liberty, Missouri and Nebraska State Normal School—now known as Peru State College—Brumage moved to Lexington, Virginia to become the tenth head football coach at the Virginia Military Institute (VMI). He held that position for two seasons, from 1911 until 1912. His career coaching record at VMI was 13–2.

=== Kentucky ===
Brumage then went to Kentucky where he was football coach from 1913 to 1914, compiling an 11–5 record, and basketball coach from 1913 to 1915, compiling a 19–7 record.

== Late life and death ==
In September 1915, Brumage was appointed as the physical director of the Birmingham Athletic Club in Birmingham, Alabama, and coached the basketball team. During World War I, Brumage attended officer's training school and was promoted to the rank of major in the United States Army. He served in France with the 322nd Field Artillery Regiment of the 83rd Infantry Division.

Brumage retired to San Antonio in the early 1940s. He died there on March 11, 1963.

== Head coaching record ==
=== Football ===
| Year | Team | Overall | Conference | Standing | Bowl/playoffs |
|---|---|---|---|---|---|
Ottawa Braves (Kansas Collegiate Athletic Conference) (1904–1907)
| 1904 | Ottawa | 3–5 | | | |
| 1905 | Ottawa | 2–6–1 | | | |
| 1906 | Ottawa | 5–2 | | | |
| 1907 | Ottawa | 4–3 | | | |
| Ottawa: | | 14–16–1 | | | |
William Jewell Baptists (Independent) (1908–1909)
| 1908 | William Jewell | 4–2 | | | |
| 1909 | William Jewell | 7–2 | | | |
| William Jewell: | | 11–4 | | | |
Nebraska State Normal (Independent) (1910)
| 1910 | Nebraska State Normal | 2–2–2 | | | |
| Nebraska State Normal: | | 2–2–2 | | | |
VMI Keydets (Independent) (1911–1912)
| 1911 | VMI | 7–1 | | | |
| 1912 | VMI | 6–1 | | | |
| VMI: | | 13–2 | | | |
Kentucky Wildcats (Southern Intercollegiate Athletic Association) (1913–1914)
| 1913 | Kentucky | 6–2 | 0–1 | | |
| 1914 | Kentucky | 5–3 | 1–1 | | |
| Kentucky: | | 11–5 | 1–2 | | |
| Total: | | 51–29–3 | | | |

=== Basketball ===
Record table
| Season | Team | Overall | Conference | Standing | Postseason |
|---|---|---|---|---|---|
William Jewell Baptists (Independent) (1908–1910)
| 1908–09 | William Jewell | 6–7 | | | |
| 1909–10 | William Jewell | 10–3 | | | |
| William Jewell: | | 16–10 | | | |
VMI Keydets (Independent) (1911–1913)
| 1911–12 | VMI | 6–5 | | | |
| 1912–13 | VMI | 8–4 | | | |
| VMI: | | 14–9 | | | |
Kentucky Wildcats (Independent) (1913–1915)
| 1913–14 | Kentucky | 12–2 | | | |
| 1914–15 | Kentucky | 7–5 | | | |
| Kentucky: | | 19–7 | | | |
| Total: | | 49–26 | | | |
