= JJA =

JJA may refer to

- Jazz Journalists Association
- Kansas Juvenile Justice Authority
- ICAO code of Jeju Air, which is the airline of Republic of Korea
