= 1911–12 VMI Keydets basketball team =

American college basketball season

1911–12 VMI Keydets men's basketball
- Conference: Independent
- Record: 7–5
- Head coach: Alpha Brummage (1st season)
- Home arena: Lexington Skating Rink

The 1911–12 VMI Keydets basketball team represented the Virginia Military Institute in their fourth ever season of basketball. The Keydets went 7–5 under head coach Alpha Brummage. They played their games out of the Lexington Skating Rink.

== Schedule ==
| Date time, TV | Opponent | Result | Record | Site city, state |
|---|---|---|---|---|
| December 16* no, no | Lynchburg YMCA | W 35–16 | 0–1 | Lexington Skating Rink; Lexington, VA |
| January 6* no, no | Emory and Henry | W 25–21 | 0–2 | Lexington Skating Rink; Lexington, VA |
| January 13* no, no | Roanoke | W 33–7 | 1–2 | Lexington Skating Rink; Lexington, VA |
| January 20* no, no | Hampden-Sydney | W 45–10 | 2–2 | Lexington Skating Rink; Lexington, VA |
| January 27* no, no | Guilford | W 18–11 | 3–2 | Lexington Skating Rink; Lexington, VA |
| February 3* no, no | Virginia | W 16–15 | 3–3 | Lexington Skating Rink; Lexington, VA |
| February 10* no, no | Wake Forest | W 23–14 | 4–3 | Lexington Skating Rink; Lexington, VA |
| February 24* no, no | Lynchburg College | W 39–13 | 5–3 | Lexington Skating Rink; Lexington, VA |
| February 29* no, no | at Lynchburg YMCA | W 52–20 | 5–4 | Unknown; Lynchburg, VA |
| March 2* no, no | at Roanoke | W 34–19 | 6–4 | Unknown; Roanoke, VA |
| March 3* no, no | at Roanoke YMCA | W 39–19 | 6–5 | Unknown; Roanoke, VA |
| March 9* no, no | Roanoke YMCA | W 36–10 | 7–5 | Lexington Skating Rink; Lexington, VA |
*Non-conference game. (#) Tournament seedings in parentheses.

== See also ==
- VMI Keydets
- VMI Keydets men's basketball
