= Beloit High School =

Beloit High School may refer to:

- Beloit Junior-Senior High School, a public high school in Beloit, Kansas, United States
- Beloit Memorial High School, a public high school in Beloit, Wisconsin, United States
