= Milieu therapy =

Form of psychotherapy that involves the use of therapeutic communities

- MeSH: D008884

Milieu therapy is a form of psychotherapy that involves the use of therapeutic communities. Patients join a group of around 30, for between 9 and 18 months. During their stay, patients are encouraged to take responsibility for themselves and the others within the unit, based upon a hierarchy of collective consequences. Patients are expected to hold one another to following rules, with more senior patients expected to model appropriate behavior for newer patients. If one patient violates the rules, others who were aware of the violation but did not intervene may also be held to account to varying extents based upon their involvement.

Milieu therapy is thought to be of value in treating personality disorders and behavioural problems, and can also be used with a goal of stimulating the patient's remaining cognitive-communicative abilities. Organizations known to use milieu therapy include Cassel Hospital, in London, Forest Heights Lodge in Evergreen, CO, the United States Veteran's Administration, and the Kansas Industrial School for Girls in Beloit, Kansas.

== Central theme ==
Milieu means "the social environment that one lives or works in". This is what the central theme of milieu therapy is - to create a good social environment, where no medications are administered, and all individuals are eager to be treated (for example, to quit substance abuse). It is a kind of psychosocial intervention. In such set-up, the environment may also function as a therapeutic agent.
