= Allen Schmidt =

American politician

Member of the Kansas Senate from the 36th district
- In office February 9, 2011 – 2012
- Preceded by: Janis Lee
- Succeeded by: Elaine Bowers

Personal details
- Party: Democratic
- Spouse: Ellen Schmidt
- Children: 9
- Education: University of Kansas (B.A.); Fort Hays State University (M.A.); U.S. Army War College (M.A.)

Allen C. Schmidt is an American former politician who served in the Kansas State Senate as a Democrat in 2011 and 2012.

Schmidt grew up on a dairy farm near Hays, Kansas, and is a fifth-generation farmer. He attended the University of Kansas and received a master's in school psychology from Fort Hays State University before joining the U.S. Army and receiving a second master's from the U.S. Army War College. He spent 32 years in the Army Service Medical Corps, retiring as a colonel.

In February 2011, Schmidt was appointed to the Kansas Senate to fill out the remaining term of Janis Lee, who had resigned upon being appointed to the Kansas Court of Tax Appeals. He chose not to stand for re-election in his own right, and in the 2012 elections the seat was taken by Republican Leslie Donovan.

After leaving the Senate, Schmidt opened a vineyard on his family's farm in 2017. He was appointed to the Kansas Board of Regents in 2019, and his term there ended on June 30, 2022.
