= Mitchell County, Kansas =

County in Kansas, United States

- County
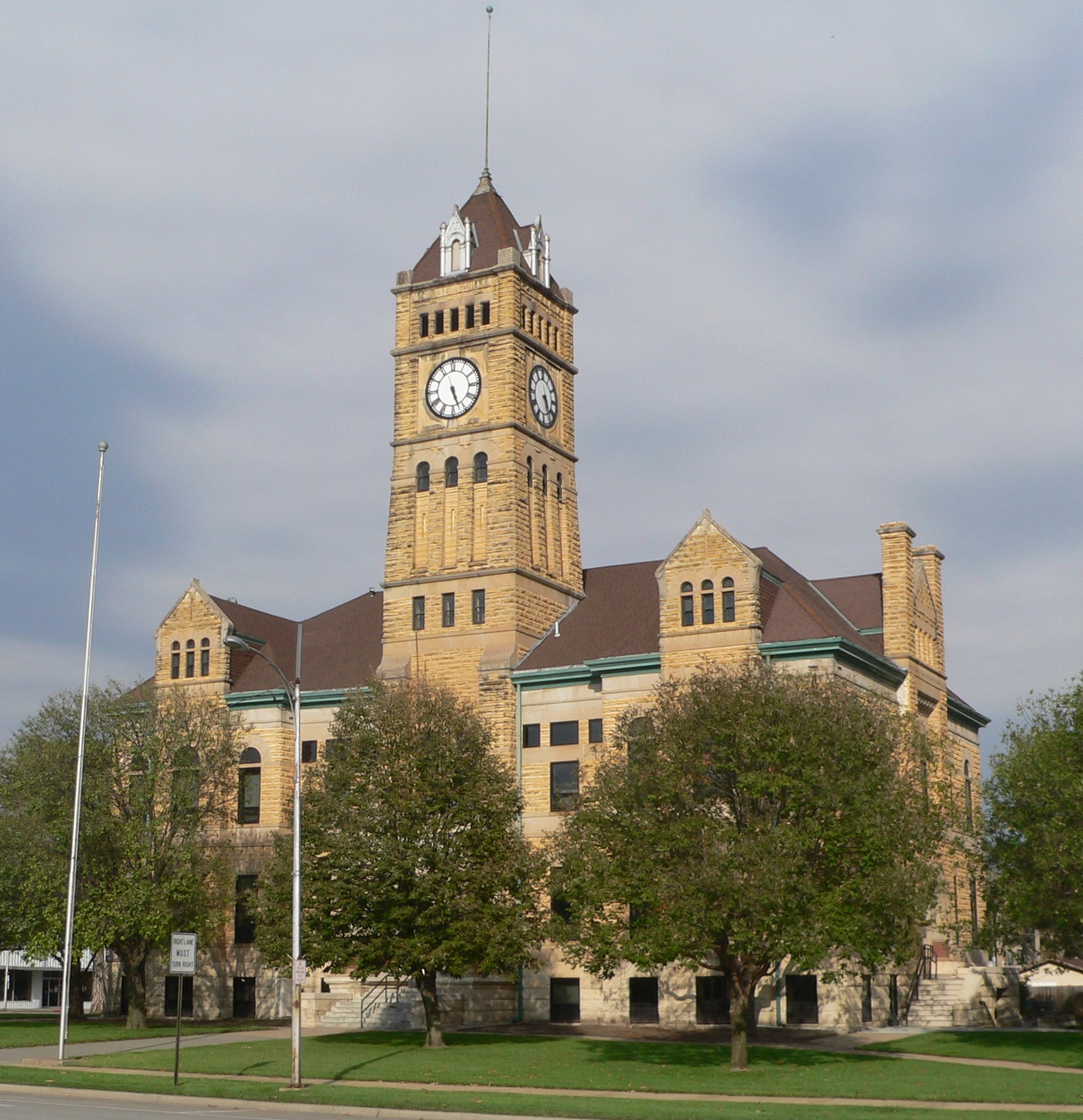
- Mitchell County Courthouse in Beloit (2014)

- Location within the U.S. state of Kansas
- Country: United States
- State: Kansas
- Founded: February 26, 1867
- Named for: William D. Mitchell
- Seat: Beloit
- Largest city: Beloit

Area
  - Total: 719 sq mi (1,860 km^{2})
  - Land: 702 sq mi (1,820 km^{2})
  - Water: 17 sq mi (44 km^{2}) 2.4%

Population (2020)
  - Total: 5,796
  - Estimate (2025): 5,590 ▼
  - Density: 8.3/sq mi (3.2/km^{2})
- Time zone: UTC−6 (Central)
  - Summer (DST): UTC−5 (CDT)
- Congressional district: 1st
- Website: County Website

Mitchell County is a county located in the U.S. state of Kansas. Its county seat and largest city is Beloit. As of the 2020 census, the county population was 5,796. The county was named for William Mitchell.

== History ==
=== Early history ===
For many millennia, the Great Plains of North America was inhabited by nomadic Native Americans. From the 16th century to 18th century, the Kingdom of France claimed ownership of large parts of North America. In 1762, after the French and Indian War, France secretly ceded New France to Spain, per the Treaty of Fontainebleau.

=== 19th century ===
In 1802, Spain returned most of the land to France, but keeping title to about 7,500 square miles. In 1803, most of the land for modern day Kansas was acquired by the United States from France as part of the 828,000 square mile Louisiana Purchase for 2.83 cents per acre.

In 1854, the Kansas Territory was organized, then in 1861 Kansas became the 34th U.S. state. In 1867, Mitchell County was established.

== Geography ==
According to the U.S. Census Bureau, the county has a total area of 719 square miles (1,860 km^{2}), of which 702 square miles (1,820 km^{2}) is land and 17 square miles (44 km^{2}) (2.4%) is water.

=== Adjacent counties ===
- Jewell County (north)
- Cloud County (east)
- Ottawa County (southeast)
- Lincoln County (south)
- Osborne County (west)

== Demographics ==
Historical population
Census	Pop.	Note	%±
1870	485		—
1880	14,911		2,974.4%
1890	15,037		0.8%
1900	14,647		−2.6%
1910	14,089		−3.8%
1920	13,886		−1.4%
1930	12,774		−8.0%
1940	11,339		−11.2%
1950	10,320		−9.0%
1960	8,866		−14.1%
1970	8,010		−9.7%
1980	8,117		1.3%
1990	7,203		−11.3%
2000	6,932		−3.8%
2010	6,373		−8.1%
2020	5,796		−9.1%
2025 (est.)	5,590	▼	−3.6%
U.S. Decennial Census; 1790-1960 1900-1990; 1990-2000 2010-2020

=== Racial and ethnic composition ===
Mitchell County, Kansas – Racial and ethnic composition Note: the US Census treats Hispanic/Latino as an ethnic category. This table excludes Latinos from the racial categories and assigns them to a separate category. Hispanics/Latinos may be of any race.
Race / Ethnicity (NH = Non-Hispanic)	Pop 1980	Pop 1990	Pop 2000	Pop 2010	Pop 2020	% 1980	% 1990	% 2000	% 2010	% 2020
White alone (NH)	8,021	7,105	6,732	6,197	5,436	98.82%	98.64%	97.11%	97.24%	93.79%
Black or African American alone (NH)	16	43	35	13	19	0.20%	0.60%	0.50%	0.20%	0.33%
Native American or Alaska Native alone (NH)	17	16	26	23	12	0.21%	0.22%	0.38%	0.36%	0.21%
Asian alone (NH)	27	10	19	19	13	0.33%	0.14%	0.27%	0.30%	0.22%
Native Hawaiian or Pacific Islander alone (NH)	x	x	2	5	0	x	x	0.03%	0.08%	0.00%
Other race alone (NH)	6	0	5	1	2	0.07%	0.00%	0.07%	0.02%	0.03%
Mixed race or Multiracial (NH)	x	x	52	42	157	x	x	0.75%	0.66%	2.71%
Hispanic or Latino (any race)	30	29	61	73	157	0.37%	0.40%	0.88%	1.15%	2.71%
Total	8,117	7,203	6,932	6,373	5,796	100.00%	100.00%	100.00%	100.00%	100.00%

=== 2020 census ===
As of the 2020 census, the county had a population of 5,796, a median age of 46.0 years, 23.1% of residents under the age of 18, and 25.4% of residents who were 65 years of age or older. For every 100 females there were 97.4 males, and for every 100 females age 18 and over there were 95.3 males age 18 and over.

0.0% of residents lived in urban areas, while 100.0% lived in rural areas.

The racial makeup of the county was 94.7% White, 0.3% Black or African American, 0.2% American Indian and Alaska Native, 0.2% Asian, 0.0% Native Hawaiian and Pacific Islander, 0.7% from some other race, and 3.8% from two or more races. Hispanic or Latino residents of any race comprised 2.7% of the population.

There were 2,543 households in the county, of which 25.4% had children under the age of 18 living with them and 23.0% had a female householder with no spouse or partner present. About 34.4% of all households were made up of individuals and 16.3% had someone living alone who was 65 years of age or older.

There were 3,124 housing units, of which 18.6% were vacant. Among occupied housing units, 73.9% were owner-occupied and 26.1% were renter-occupied. The homeowner vacancy rate was 3.1% and the rental vacancy rate was 14.0%.

=== 2010 census ===
As of the census of 2010, there were 6,373 people, 2,790 households, and 1,725 families residing in the county. The population density was 8.8 people per square mile (3.4 people/km^{2}). There were 3,296 housing units at an average density of 4.6 per square mile (1.8/km^{2}). The racial makeup of the county was 97.97% White, 0.20% Black or African American, 0.37% Native American, 0.29% Asian, 0.07% Pacific Islander, 0.26% from other races, and 0.80% from two or more races. 1.14% of the population were Hispanic or Latino of any race.

There were 2,790 households, out of which 24.30% had children under the age of 18 living with them, 52.29% were married couples living together, 6.23% had a female householder with no husband present, and 38.17% were non-families. 33.08% of all households were made up of individuals, and 15.12% had someone living alone who was 65 years of age or older. The average household size was 2.20 and the average family size was 2.77.

In the county, the population was spread out, with 21.44% under the age of 18, 8.00% from 18 to 24, 19.83% from 25 to 44, 29.67% from 45 to 64, and 21.04% who were 65 years of age or older. The median age was 45.6 years. For every 100 females there were 102.0 males. For every 100 females age 18 and over, there were 102.2 males.

The median income for a household in the county was $44,247, and the median income for a family was $54,502. Males had a median income of $30,044 versus $20,094 for females. The per capita income for the county was $23,350. About 4.90% of families and 8.26% of the population were below the poverty line, including 12.04% of those under age 18 and 12.33% of those age 65 or over.

== Government ==
=== Presidential elections ===
Prior to 1940, Mitchell County was a swing county, backing the national winner in every presidential election from 1900 to 1936. Since 1940, it has become a Republican stronghold, with only George H. W. Bush in 1992 failing to win a majority in the county due to Ross Perot's strong showing in Kansas.

Presidential election results

United States presidential election results for Mitchell County, Kansas
Year	Republican		Democratic		Third party(ies)	
Year	No.	%	No.	%	No.	%
1888	1,676	55.90%	880	29.35%	442	14.74%
1892	1,467	43.51%	0	0.00%	1,905	56.49%
1896	1,428	42.67%	1,889	56.44%	30	0.90%
1900	1,764	49.65%	1,702	47.90%	87	2.45%
1904	2,037	63.88%	867	27.19%	285	8.94%
1908	1,765	50.50%	1,570	44.92%	160	4.58%
1912	737	22.06%	1,441	43.13%	1,163	34.81%
1916	2,413	41.42%	3,197	54.88%	215	3.69%
1920	3,310	68.32%	1,409	29.08%	126	2.60%
1924	3,161	59.79%	1,470	27.80%	656	12.41%
1928	3,245	62.84%	1,855	35.92%	64	1.24%
1932	2,502	42.70%	3,176	54.21%	181	3.09%
1936	2,781	45.51%	3,289	53.82%	41	0.67%
1940	3,681	63.55%	2,060	35.57%	51	0.88%
1944	3,238	66.67%	1,579	32.51%	40	0.82%
1948	2,998	62.16%	1,750	36.28%	75	1.56%
1952	4,167	80.98%	961	18.67%	18	0.35%
1956	3,198	72.16%	1,214	27.39%	20	0.45%
1960	2,779	61.80%	1,692	37.63%	26	0.58%
1964	1,951	50.28%	1,898	48.92%	31	0.80%
1968	2,428	62.89%	1,144	29.63%	289	7.49%
1972	2,830	71.59%	1,030	26.06%	93	2.35%
1976	2,095	53.99%	1,700	43.81%	85	2.19%
1980	2,821	71.36%	876	22.16%	256	6.48%
1984	3,036	75.98%	919	23.00%	41	1.03%
1988	2,257	65.19%	1,145	33.07%	60	1.73%
1992	1,601	43.86%	938	25.70%	1,111	30.44%
1996	2,435	68.71%	833	23.50%	276	7.79%
2000	2,350	71.95%	751	22.99%	165	5.05%
2004	2,609	77.90%	693	20.69%	47	1.40%
2008	2,440	76.18%	701	21.89%	62	1.94%
2012	2,327	78.48%	584	19.70%	54	1.82%
2016	2,308	78.45%	477	16.21%	157	5.34%
2020	2,504	80.75%	558	17.99%	39	1.26%
2024	2,608	82.22%	528	16.65%	36	1.13%

=== Laws ===
Following amendment to the Kansas Constitution in 1986, the county remained a prohibition, or "dry", county until 1996, when voters approved the sale of alcoholic liquor by the individual drink with a 30% food sales requirement.

== Education ==
=== Colleges ===
- North Central Kansas Technical College in Beloit

=== Unified school districts ===
- Waconda USD 272
- Beloit USD 273

=== Private schools ===
- St. John's Catholic High School
- Tipton Catholic High School

== Communities ==
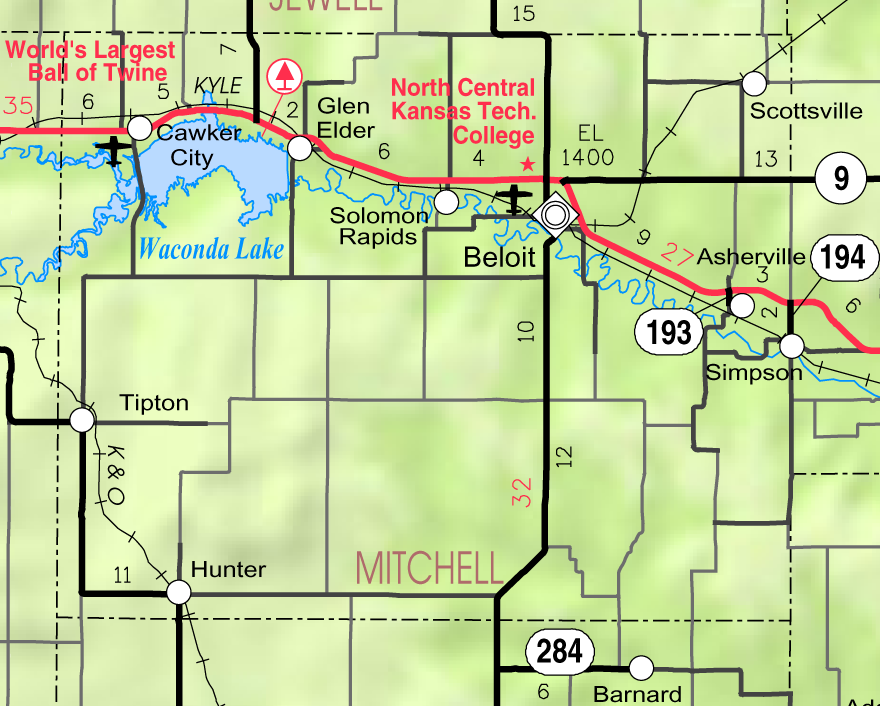
2005 map of Mitchell County (map legend)

List of townships / incorporated cities / unincorporated communities / extinct former communities within Mitchell County.

=== Cities ===
‡ means a community has portions in an adjacent county.

- Beloit (county seat)
- Cawker City
- Glen Elder
- Hunter
- Scottsville
- Simpson‡
- Tipton

=== Unincorporated communities ===
† means a community is designated a Census-Designated Place (CDP) by the United States Census Bureau.

- Asherville†
- Solomon Rapids

=== Ghost towns ===
- Blue Hill
- Buel
- Coursens Grove
- Elmira
- Saltville
- Sunflower
- Victor
- Walnut Grove
- West Asher

=== Townships ===
Mitchell County is divided into twenty townships. The city of Beloit is considered governmentally independent and is excluded from the census figures for the townships. In the following table, the population center is the largest city (or cities) included in that township's population total, if it is of a significant size.

Sources: 2000 U.S. Gazetteer from the U.S. Census Bureau.
Township	FIPS	Population center	Population	Population density /km^{2} (/sq mi)	Land area km^{2} (sq mi)	Water area km^{2} (sq mi)	Water %	Geographic coordinates
Asherville	02625		122	1 (3)	93 (36)	0 (0)	0.08%	39°25′48″N 97°59′28″W
Beloit	05800	Beloit	4,003	48 (125)	83 (32)	0 (0)	0.02%	39°26′40″N 98°5′33″W
Bloomfield	07425		83	1 (2)	94 (36)	0 (0)	0.24%	39°20′33″N 98°6′24″W
Blue Hill	07575		36	0 (1)	93 (36)	0 (0)	0.36%	39°15′17″N 98°18′43″W
Carr Creek	10850		31	0 (1)	84 (33)	9 (3)	9.51%	39°26′23″N 98°26′40″W
Cawker	11150	Cawker City	578	8 (20)	75 (29)	17 (7)	18.68%	39°30′55″N 98°26′2″W
Center	11875		49	1 (1)	93 (36)	0 (0)	0.03%	39°21′26″N 98°12′2″W
Custer	16875	Hunter	132	1 (4)	94 (36)	0 (0)	0.13%	39°14′56″N 98°24′53″W
Eureka	21875		41	0 (1)	93 (36)	0 (0)	0.38%	39°15′20″N 97°59′46″W
Glen Elder	26525	Glen Elder	553	7 (18)	78 (30)	15 (6)	16.01%	39°30′32″N 98°18′49″W
Hayes	30975		21	0 (1)	93 (36)	0 (0)	0.03%	39°20′4″N 98°19′8″W
Logan	42025	Simpson	168	2 (5)	93 (36)	0 (0)	0.12%	39°21′59″N 97°56′21″W
Lulu	43225	Scottsville	90	1 (3)	92 (35)	0 (0)	0%	39°31′53″N 97°58′34″W
Pittsburg	56050	Tipton	346	4 (10)	93 (36)	0 (0)	0.03%	39°20′31″N 98°28′3″W
Plum Creek	56825		119	1 (3)	92 (36)	0 (0)	0.02%	39°30′53″N 98°5′21″W
Round Springs	61500		27	0 (1)	93 (36)	0 (0)	0.14%	39°15′51″N 98°11′28″W
Salt Creek	62825		39	0 (1)	93 (36)	0 (0)	0.37%	39°15′12″N 98°6′11″W
Solomon Rapids	66450		80	1 (2)	91 (35)	0 (0)	0.14%	39°31′19″N 98°12′58″W
Turkey Creek	71725		134	1 (4)	92 (36)	0 (0)	0.23%	39°26′40″N 98°12′1″W
Walnut Creek	75150		42	0 (1)	88 (34)	5 (2)	5.78%	39°26′49″N 98°19′1″W

== See also ==
- National Register of Historic Places listings in Mitchell County, Kansas

Community information for Kansas

- Kansas locations by per capita income
- List of counties in Kansas
- List of townships in Kansas
- List of cities in Kansas
- List of unincorporated communities in Kansas
- List of ghost towns in Kansas
