= Big Ten Conference Men's Basketball Coach of the Year =

Honor awarded to college basketball coaches

Big Ten Coach of the Year
- Awarded for: the top men's basketball coach in the Big Ten Conference
- Country: United States

History
- First award: 1974
- Most recent: Tom Izzo, Michigan State

The Big Ten Conference Men's Basketball Coach of the Year, is an annual college basketball award presented to the top men's basketball coach in the Big Ten Conference. The winner is selected by the Big Ten media association and conference coaches. The award was first given following the 1973–74 season to Johnny Orr of Michigan. Bill Carmody is the only coach to have received the award with a losing record. Former Purdue coach Gene Keady has won the award a record seven times.

== Key ==
	Awarded one of the following National Coach of the Year awards that year: Associated Press Coach of the Year (AP); Adolph Rupp Cup (ARC); Basketball Times Coach of the Year (BT); CBS/Chevrolet Coach of the Year (CBS); Henry Iba Award (HI); Naismith Coach of the Year (N); NABC Coach of the Year (NABC); Sporting News Coach of the Year (SN); United Press International Coach of the Year (UPI); U.S. Basketball Writers Association (USBWA)
Coach (X)	Denotes the number of times the coach had been awarded the Coach of the Year award at that point
†	Co-Coaches of the Year
*	Elected to the Naismith Memorial Basketball Hall of Fame as a coach but is no longer active
*^	Active coach who has been elected to the Naismith Memorial Basketball Hall of Fame (as a coach)
Conf. W–L	Conference win–loss record for that season
Conf. St.^{T}	Conference standing at year's end (^{T}denotes a tie)
Overall W–L	Overall win–loss record for that season
Season^{‡}	Team won the NCAA Division I National Championship

== Winners ==
Season	Coach	School	National Coach of the Year Awards	Conf. W–L	Conf. St.	Overall W–L	Source(s)
1973–74	Johnny Orr	Michigan	—	12–2	1st^{T}	22–5	
1974–75	Bob Knight*	Indiana	AP; USBWA; UPI	18–0	1st	31–1	
1975–76^{‡}	Bob Knight* (2)	Indiana	AP; NABC	18–0	1st	32–0	
1976–77	Johnny Orr (2)	Michigan	—	16–2	1st	26–4	
1977–78	Jud Heathcote	Michigan State	—	15–3	1st	25–5	
1978–79	Lute Olson	Iowa	—	13–5	1st	20–8	
1979–80	Bob Knight* (3)	Indiana	—	13–5	1st	21–8	
1980–81^{‡}	Bob Knight* (4)	Indiana	—	14–4	1st	26–9	
1981–82	Jim Dutcher	Minnesota	—	14–4	1st	23–6	
1982–83	Eldon Miller	Ohio State	—	11–7	2nd^{T}	20–10	
1983–84	Gene Keady*	Purdue	USBWA	15–3	1st^{T}	22–7	
1984–85	Bill Frieder	Michigan	AP	16–2	1st	26–4	
1985–86	Jud Heathcote (2)	Michigan State	—	12–6	3rd	23–8	
1986–87	Tom Davis	Iowa	—	14–4	3rd	30–5	
1987–88	Gene Keady* (2)	Purdue	—	16–2	1st	29–4	
1988–89	Bob Knight* (5)	Indiana	AP; BT; UPI; USBWA	15–3	1st	27–8	
1989–90	Gene Keady* (3)	Purdue	—	13–5	2nd	22–8	
1990–91	Randy Ayers	Ohio State	AP; N USBWA	15–3	1st	27–4	
1991–92	Randy Ayers (2)	Ohio State	—	15–3	1st	26–6	
1992–93	Lou Henson	Illinois	—	11–7	3rd^{T}	19–13	
1993–94	Gene Keady* (4)	Purdue	NABC	14–4	1st	29–5	
1994–95	Gene Keady* (5)	Purdue	—	15–3	1st	25–7	
1995–96	Gene Keady* (6)	Purdue	AP; UPI; USBWA	15–3	1st	26–6	
1996–97	Clem Haskins^{[Note A]}	Minnesota	AP	16–2	1st	31–4	
1997–98	Tom Izzo*^	Michigan State	AP	13–3	1st^{T}	22–8	
1998–99	Jim O'Brien	Ohio State	NABC	12–4	2nd	27–9	
1999–2000	Gene Keady* (7)	Purdue	—	12–4	2nd	24–10	
2000–01	Jim O'Brien (2)	Ohio State	—	11–5	3rd	20–11	
2001–02	Bo Ryan*	Wisconsin	—	11–5	1st^{T}	19–13	
2002–03	Bo Ryan* (2)	Wisconsin	—	12–4	1st	24–8	
2003–04	Bill Carmody	Northwestern	—	8–8	5th^{T}	14–15	
2004–05	Bruce Weber	Illinois	AP; USBWA	15–1	1st	37–2	
2005–06	Thad Matta	Ohio State	—	12–4	1st	26–6	
2006–07	Thad Matta (2)	Ohio State	—	15–1	1st	35–4	
2007–08	Matt Painter	Purdue	—	15–3	2nd	25–9	
2008–09^{†}	Ed DeChellis	Penn State	—	10–8	4th^{T}	27–11	
2008–09^{†}	Tom Izzo*^ (2)	Michigan State	—	15–3	1st	31–7	
2009–10^{†}	Thad Matta (3)	Ohio State	—	14–4	1st^{T}	29–8	
2009–10^{†}	Matt Painter (2)	Purdue	—	14–4	1st^{T}	29–6	
2010–11	Matt Painter (3)	Purdue	—	14–4	2nd	26–8	
2011–12	Tom Izzo*^ (3)	Michigan State	—	13–5	1st^{T}	29–8	
2012–13	Bo Ryan* (3)	Wisconsin	—	12–6	4th^{T}	23–12	
2013–14^{†}	John Beilein	Michigan	—	15–3	1st	28–9	
2013–14^{†}	Tim Miles	Nebraska	—	11–7	4th	19–13	
2014–15^{†}	Bo Ryan* (4)	Wisconsin	—	16–2	1st	36–4	
2014–15^{†}	Mark Turgeon	Maryland	—	14–4	2nd	28–7	
2015–16	Tom Crean	Indiana	—	15–3	1st	27–8	
2016–17	Richard Pitino	Minnesota	—	11–7	4th	24–10	
2017–18	Chris Holtmann	Ohio State	—	15–3	2nd^{T}	25–9	
2018–19	Matt Painter (4)	Purdue	AP	16–4	1st^{T}	26–10	
2019–20	Greg Gard	Wisconsin	—	14–6	1st^{T}	21–10	
2020–21	Juwan Howard	Michigan	AP; HI; SN	14–3	1st	23–5	
2021–22	Greg Gard (2)	Wisconsin	—	15–5	1st^{T}	24–6	
2022–23	Chris Collins	Northwestern	—	12–8	2nd^{T}	21–10	
2023–24^{†}	Fred Hoiberg	Nebraska	—	12–8	2nd^{T}	22–9	
2023–24^{†}	Matt Painter (5)	Purdue	—	17–3	1st	28–3	
2024–25	Tom Izzo (4)	Michigan State	—	17–3	1st	26–5	
2025–26^{†}	Fred Hoiberg (2)	Nebraska	AP	15–5	2nd^{T}	26–5	
2025–26^{†}	Dusty May	Michigan	—	19–1	1st	29–2	

== Winners by school ==
School (year joined)	Winners	Years
Purdue	12	1984, 1988, 1990, 1994, 1995, 1996, 2000, 2008, 2010, 2011, 2019, 2024
Ohio State	9	1983, 1991, 1992, 1999, 2001, 2006, 2007, 2010, 2018
Indiana	6	1975, 1976, 1980, 1981, 1989, 2016
Wisconsin	6	2002, 2003, 2013, 2015, 2020, 2022
Michigan State	6	1978, 1986, 1998, 2009, 2012, 2025
Michigan	6	1974, 1977, 1985, 2014, 2021, 2026
Illinois	2	1993, 2005
Iowa	2	1979, 1987
Minnesota^{[Note A]}	2	1982, 1997*, 2017
Nebraska (2012)	3	2014, 2024, 2026
Northwestern	2	2004, 2023
Maryland (2015)	1	2015
Penn State (1993)	1	2009
Rutgers (2015)	0	—

== Notes ==
^A . Minnesota's 1997 award was vacated due to NCAA infractions.
