= Sunflower, Kansas =

Coordinates: 39°03′55″N 94°51′51″W

Sunflower was a rural community in Center Township in Mitchell County, Kansas, United States, established in 1890.

== History ==
Walter and Honora (Tilton) Cooke came to Mitchell County, Kansas in 1884. They leased with an intent to buy the NE 1/4 of Section 36 in Center Township from the State of Kansas. By 1890, a small community had formed. A blacksmith, creamery, school and small store had been established by 1895. The Cooke's purchased the property on February 23, 1897, for $1,154.00. On April 27, 1898, the Sunflower community was recognized by the U.S. Government by installing a post office. The post only lasted until July 31, 1901, but Sunflower community remained until the early 1940s. Sunflower received its name from the Sunflower Trail that for a short time ran right through the community.

A native limestone monument at the former location of Sunflower was placed by Elva and Micah Tice. As of May 30, 2016, Micah Tice's family is the fifth generation farming this land.
