= Gene Keady =

American basketball coach (born 1936)

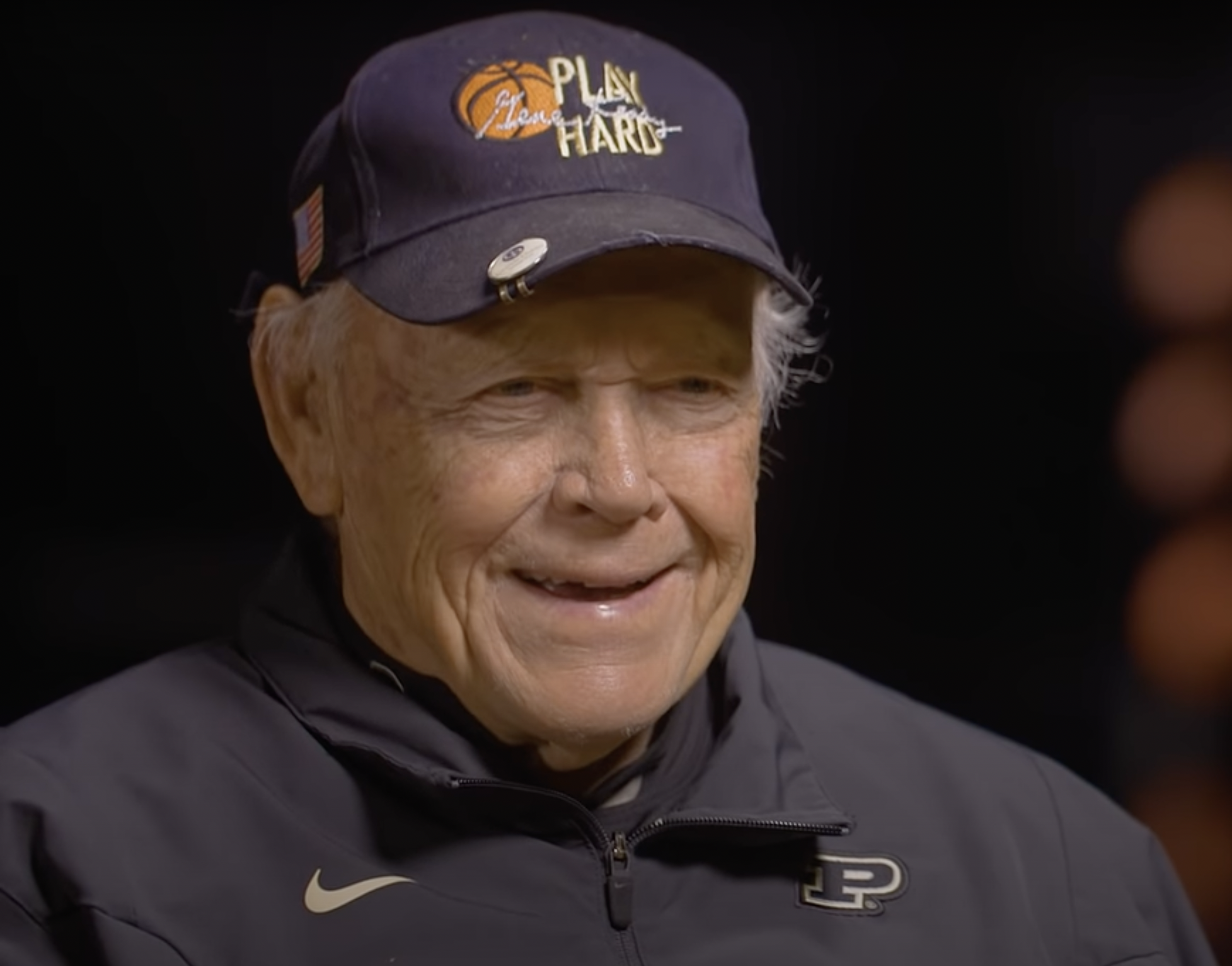
- Keady in 2022

Biographical details
- Born: May 21, 1936 (age 90); Larned, Kansas, U.S.

Playing career
- 1954–1956: Garden City CC
- 1956–1958: Kansas State

Coaching career (HC unless noted)
- 1959–1965: Beloit Jr-Sr HS (KS)
- 1965–1966: Hutchinson JC (assistant)
- 1966–1974: Hutchinson JC
- 1975–1978: Arkansas (assistant)
- 1978–1980: Western Kentucky
- 1980–2005: Purdue
- 2005–2006: Toronto Raptors (assistant)
- 2010–2015: St. John's (assistant)

Head coaching record
- Overall: 737–340 (.684) (college)

Accomplishments and honors

Championships
- 6 KJJCC regular season (1967, 1968, 1971–1974); OVC regular season (1980); OVC tournament (1980); 6 Big Ten regular season (1984, 1987, 1988, 1994–1996)

Awards
- 7× Big Ten Coach of the Year (1984, 1988, 1990, 1994–1996, 2000); 6× National Coach of the Year (1984, 1988, 1994, 1995, 1996, 2000); NJCAA Hall of Fame (1990); Indiana Basketball Hall of Fame (2001); John R. Wooden Legends of Coaching Award (2007)
- Basketball Hall of Fame; Inducted in 2023 (profile)
- College Basketball Hall of Fame; Inducted in 2013
Medal record
Head Coach for United States
William Jones Cup
Silver medal – second place	1985 Jones Cup	Head coach
World University Games
Gold medal – first place	1989 Duisburg	Head coach
Pan American Games
Bronze medal – third place	1991 Havana	Head coach
Olympic Games
Gold medal – first place	2000 Sydney	Team

Lloyd Eugene Keady (born May 21, 1936) is an American Hall of Fame basketball coach. He is best known for his 25 years serving as the head men's basketball coach at Purdue University in Indiana. In his tenure leading the Boilermakers from 1980 to 2005, he went to the NCAA Tournament seventeen times, twice advancing to the Elite Eight.

== Personal life ==
Keady was born in Larned, Kansas on May 21, 1936. He graduated from Larned High School. He had two children with his first wife. He married his second wife, Patricia, in 1981, and adopted her daughter. They were married until her death in 2009. He has been married since 2012 to Kathleen Petrie.

== Playing career ==
=== Kansas State ===
Keady's father instilled in him a passion for sports. This became evident as Keady was a four-sport athlete at Garden City Junior College in Garden City, Kansas. At the junior college level, Keady was named an All-American in football for playing quarterback. Keady continued his education at Kansas State University. At Kansas State, Keady was a letter-winner in three sports: football, baseball, and track. In the summer of 1958, Keady graduated from Kansas State with a B.S. in biological sciences and physical education.

=== Professional ===
Keady was drafted in the 19th round of the 1958 NFL draft by the Pittsburgh Steelers (223rd overall pick) but did not play.

== Coaching career ==
=== High school ===
Beloit High School (1959–1965)

With his football career over, Keady returned to Kansas in 1959 where he accepted a teaching and coaching position at Beloit Junior-Senior High School in Beloit, Kansas. The only coaching position open at the school was for the basketball team. Keady coached in Beloit for six years from 1959 to 1965. Keady understood the value of education and never stopped learning, even while he was coaching. In 1964, he earned his master's degree in education from Kansas State. While coaching high school basketball, he compiled a record of 142 wins to 47 losses (.751).

=== College ===
Hutchinson Junior College (1965–1974)

Keady began his college coaching career with Hutchinson Junior College in Hutchinson, Kansas. He served as the assistant coach for the Blue Dragons starting in 1965. After only one year, Keady was promoted to take over the head coaching position. Under Keady's leadership the Blue Dragons won six Jayhawk Conference titles, and Keady earned the title of junior college coach of the year three times (1971, 1972, 1973) for his region. The highlight of his early coaching career came in 1973 when Hutchinson finished second in the junior college national tournament after completing the season with 29 wins and 4 losses. His overall record at Hutchinson was 187–48 (.796).

Arkansas (1975–1978)

Following the 1974 season, Keady moved into NCAA Division I college basketball and became an assistant coach for Arkansas. Head coach Eddie Sutton and Keady made the Razorbacks into a perennial national contender. In 1977, Arkansas appeared in the NCAA tournament for the first time in nineteen years. In 1978, Arkansas made it to the Final Four. Although they lost a close game to Kentucky, making it to the Final Four was a huge success for Keady and Sutton. While at Arkansas, Keady gained fame for his impressive recruiting skills. Notable players that were recruited by Keady include Ron Brewer, Marvin Delph and Sidney Moncrief. During his time at Arkansas, the team accumulated 94 wins with 24 losses (.797).

Western Kentucky (1978–1980)

Following a third-place finish in the 1978 NCAA tournament, Keady was ready to lead his own team. In 1978, he accepted the position of head coach for Western Kentucky University. In his first year as a division one head coach, the team went 17–11, and finished tied for second in the conference. The team improved in his second year to 21–8 and be named the regular season Ohio Valley Conference Co-Champions. The team won the Ohio Valley Conference Tournament and earned a berth in the NCAA tournament. In the first round, the team played Virginia Tech, but lost in overtime. While at Western Kentucky, Keady and assistant coach Bruce Weber compiled an overall record of 38–19 (.667).

Purdue (1980–2005)

Gene Keady became the Purdue Boilermakers men's basketball head coach on April 11, 1980. Keady became the winningest coach in school history with 493 victories and second winningest coach in Big Ten Conference history, behind only his former rival: Bob Knight. He was also the Big Ten Coach of the Year a record seven times. He guided the Boilermakers to six Big Ten titles, including three straight outright crowns from 1994 through 1996. Beginning in 2004, Keady hired current Purdue coach Matt Painter (1989–1993) as his associate head coach for the 2004–2005 season. Painter took over Purdue head coaching duties when Keady retired.

Keady retired from coaching following the 2004–2005 season after leading Purdue to 18 NCAA tournament appearances. He took the Boilermakers to two Elite Eight appearances and five total Sweet Sixteen appearances. His total NCAA tournament postseason record is 20–19. He led Purdue to five NIT appearances with a record of 12–5 and a Runner-up and third-place finish. Mackey Arena's basketball court was named "Keady Court" in dedication to him. In October 2006, Keady was named the recipient of the 2007 John R. Wooden "Legends of Coaching" Award. Keady is the ninth recipient of this award, as it was created in 1999. While coaching at Purdue, Keady was quoted saying, "Recruiting is a lot like shaving, if you miss a day, you look like a bum."

His tenure at Purdue was notable in the number of wins he achieved, despite coaching only one All-American: Glenn Robinson (1993 Consensus 2nd Team & 1994 Consensus 1st Team, Consensus National Player of the Year). Seven of his other players also earned honors from the All-American selectors: Keith Edmonson (1982 AP Honorable Mention); Troy Lewis (1987 & 1988 AP Honorable Mention), Todd Mitchell (1988 NABC 3rd Team, AP Honorable Mention); Steve Scheffler (1990 AP & UPI 3rd Team), Cuonzo Martin (1995 AP Honorable Mention); Chad Austin (1998 AP Honorable Mention), Brad Miller (1998 AP Honorable Mention).

St. John's (2010–2015)

In October 2010, newly hired St. John's coach, Steve Lavin, hired Keady to be his assistant coach. His main roles were breaking down game film and serving as a bench coach on game days.

=== International ===
As the head coach of various USA Basketball teams, Keady racked up a record of 22–2 (.917) in four different tournaments from 1979 to 1991. He led Team USA to two gold medals: one in 1979 at the National Sports Festival, and another in 1989 at the World University Games. Keady also grabbed the silver medal in 1985 at the R. Williams Jones Cup (the 9th edition of the tournament) losing to the San Miguel Beer Team (Philippines) 108–100 OT.

He led Team USA to the bronze at the 1991 Pan-American Games.

Dream Team (2000)

In 2000, Keady was an assistant coach for the Dream Team; while coaches are not awarded medals, the team won the gold medal in the Olympic Games in Sydney.

=== Professional ===
Toronto Raptors (2005–2006)

On December 6, 2005, Keady accepted the position of an assistant coach with the Toronto Raptors offered to him by senior basketball adviser to the president, Wayne Embry. The hiring was officially announced by the club on December 9 in a press release. On May 18, 2006, it was announced that Keady would not be returning for the 2006–07 season because of his wife's illness.

== Basketball analyst career ==
Big Ten Network (2007–present)

In 2007, The Big Ten Network, a network that airs live sporting events of Big Ten Conference teams and news from around the conference, hired Keady to be a basketball analyst, along with former Big Ten basketball players, Tim Doyle and Jim Jackson. Keady was also an occasional commentator for the network. He now attends Purdue home games on a regular basis.

== Coaching tree ==
The Gene Keady coaching tree is a chain of NCAA basketball coaches who can trace their coaching roots to Gene Keady. Some of the most notable coaches include:

Bruce Weber
After serving as an assistant under Keady for one season at Western Kentucky and 18 seasons at Purdue, Bruce Weber became the head coach at Southern Illinois University in 1998. He quickly turned a losing team into a success, winning the Missouri Valley Conference title twice and making two NCAA Tournament appearances in his five seasons with the Salukis, including a Sweet Sixteen run in 2002. From 2003 to 2012, he was the head coach at Illinois, where he led the Illini team to two Big Ten Conference championships and six NCAA Tournament appearances, including a trip to the NCAA Finals in 2005. Weber went on to serve as the head coach at Kansas State leading the Wildcats to two regular season Big 12 Championships and an Elite Eight appearance in 2018,
Kevin Stallings
Kevin Stallings was an assistant under Keady for six seasons from 1982 to 1988; he also played at Purdue for three seasons, two of them under Keady. He then spent five years as an assistant at the University of Kansas, where he helped lead the Jayhawks to two Final Four appearances under Roy Williams. In 1993, he became the head coach at Illinois State, where he led the Redbirds to two Missouri Valley Conference championships and two NCAA appearances in six seasons. As head coach at Vanderbilt University, he led the Commodores to two Sweet Sixteen appearances, and he was named Southeastern Conference Coach of the Year in 2007 and 2010. He was named head coach of the Pittsburgh Panthers in 2016. Stallings was fired from Pitt on March 8, 2018.
Steve Lavin
Steve Lavin was an assistant coach at Purdue under Keady from 1988 to 1991 before he was hired as an assistant at UCLA. Lavin was an assistant under Jim Harrick in 1995 when UCLA won the NCAA Championship. In 1996, after Harrick was fired, Lavin took over as UCLA's head coach. In seven seasons as head coach, Lavin led the Bruins to six consecutive NCAA appearances and four Sweet Sixteens and an Elite Eight. He was named Pacific-10 Conference Coach of the Year in 2001. Lavin then served as a color commentator on ABC and ESPN. After a stint commentating for college basketball, Lavin accepted the offer to be the new St. John's head coach of the Big East Conference starting the 2010–2011 season.
Matt Painter
Matt Painter played for Keady from 1989–1993, starting 50 games for the Boilermakers. After graduation, Painter turned to coaching basketball, beginning his career as an assistant at Division III Washington & Jefferson College in 1993, after which he spent one season as an assistant at Division II Barton College and three seasons at Division I Eastern Illinois University. In 1998, Painter joined the Southern Illinois coaching staff as an assistant when Bruce Weber took over the head coaching position. After Weber left for Illinois, Painter took over the head coaching position and he led the Salukis to a conference title and to an NCAA appearance in his only season as the head coach. In 2004, he took an associate head coaching position at Purdue University. After Keady retired in 2005, Painter took the head coaching job. He led the Boilers to five consecutive NCAA Tournament appearances in his first six seasons as the head coach at Purdue, while being named the Big Ten Conference Coach of the Year in 2008, 2010 and 2011.
Cuonzo Martin
Cuonzo Martin was an assistant for Keady and Painter at his alma mater from 2000 to 2008 at Purdue (where he played from 1991–1995 under Keady) before moving on to his first head coaching position at Missouri State, where he led the Bears to a 10–0 start in the 2009–2010 season and their first MVC conference title in the 2010–2011 season. In March 2011 Martin was named the head coach at the University of Tennessee. He was named the head coach of the University of California Golden Bears on April 15, 2014. He replaced Mike Montgomery at Cal when Montgomery retired. On March 15, 2017, Martin was named head coach of Missouri, replacing the fired Kim Anderson.
Alan Major
Alan Major served as a student manager under Keady during his undergraduate tenure at Purdue. After graduating in 1992, Major became an assistant coach at Cal Lutheran, a Div. III school, and then Pacific. He spent one season (1998–1999) on the staff of fellow Purdue alumnus Bruce Weber before returning to Pacific. In 2001, he became an assistant coach at Xavier under Thad Matta. He followed Matta to Ohio State in 2004 where he worked as an assistant coach for six seasons. In 2010, he was named the head coach of Charlotte.
Linc Darner
Although never serving as an assistant under Keady, Linc Darner was a player under Keady at Purdue from 1991 to 1994, teaming with Cuonzo Martin and Matt Painter. He began his coaching career as an assistant at Lincoln Memorial University, before moving to Ashland University as the school's recruiting coordinator and moved on to Murray State, where helped them win two Ohio Valley Conference championships as an assistant. He got his first head coaching position at St. Joseph's, a Div. II college in Indiana in the Great Lakes Valley Conference. He then moved on to coach the Mocs at Florida Southern, a Division II team in the Sunshine State Conference. In his second season at FSC, he was named the Sunshine State Conference Coach of the Year, while winning the conference title and tournament. He led the Mocs to the 2015 Division II National Championship. Less than a month later he was named the head coach at Green Bay.
Paul Lusk
Paul Lusk is currently an assistant coach under Matt Painter at Purdue. He transferred from the Southern Illinois bench staff to assist under Keady and associate head coach Matt Painter. Lusk served under Keady for the 2005 season and continued to serve under Painter for the following six seasons (2006–2011), being named his associate head coach (2009–2011) after Cuonzo Martin moved to Missouri State to take the head coaching position. He helped lead Purdue to four NCAA Tournament appearances, which included two Sweet Sixteens with a 6–4 record in the NCAA tournament. He helped lead the Boilers to a Conference Tournament Championship (2009), as well as help lead the Boilermakers to a Big Ten Title (2010). After the 2011 season, Lusk accepted the vacant head coaching job at Missouri State, taking over Cuonzo Martin's position. On December 28, 2011, Lusk led the Bears to a victory on the road against #21 Creighton. Lusk was fired from Missouri State on March 3, 2018.
Austin Parkinson
Austin Parkinson currently serves as the head women's basketball coach at Butler University. He previously served as the head women's basketball coach at Indiana University Purdue University – Indianapolis (IUPUI), a division 1 school in the Summit League. Parkinson played under Keady at Purdue from 2000–2004 and served as a graduate assistant following his playing career. Later he began his coaching career on the staff of former Big Ten rival IU graduate Dane Fife at Indiana University Purdue University – Fort Wayne (IPFW). Parkinson left IPFW to become assistant men's head coach at IUPUI. The Summit League awarded Parkinson 2012–2013 Women's Basketball Coach of the Year.
Carson Cunningham
Carson Cunningham previously served as the head coach at Carroll College (MT), an NAIA Division I school in the Frontier Conference.: Cunningham played under Keady at Purdue from 1998–2001, leading the Boilermakers to a pair of Sweet 16 finishes and one Elite Eight appearance. He is one of three two-time Academic All-America basketball players from Purdue, (the others: Coach John Wooden and Steve Reid). Following a four-year professional career in the CBA and overseas, Cunningham completed his PhD and began an academic career at DePaul University; simultaneously, he began coaching at his high school alma mater, spending five years at Andrean High School in Merrillville, Indiana. Cunningham turned around a program that won two games the season before he arrived into one that won four straight sectional titles and 43 of their last 50 games. His final season, he led the ‘59ers to the final four in Indiana’s second biggest class (3A) and a #3 state ranking. On March 23, 2018, Cunningham was hired as head coach of Incarnate Word.

== Head coaching record ==
=== College ===
Record table
Season	Team	Overall	Conference	Standing	Postseason
Hutchinson Blue Dragons (Kansas Jayhawk Junior College Conference) (1966–1974)
1966–67	Hutchinson	18–6	9–1	1st	NJCAA Regional Tourney
1967–68	Hutchinson	25–3	10–0	1st	NJCAA National Tourney
1968–69	Hutchinson	22–11	7–3	3rd	NJCAA National Tourney
1969–70	Hutchinson	16–8	7–3	3rd	NJCAA Regional Tourney
1970–71	Hutchinson	28–9	13–1	1st	NJCAA National Tourney
1971–72	Hutchinson	24–6	13–1	1st	NJCAA National Tourney
1972–73	Hutchinson	29–4	13–1	1st	NJCAA National Finalist
1973–74	Hutchinson	25–4	14–0	1st	NJCAA Regional Tourney
Hutchinson Community:		187–51 (.786)	90–10 (.900)		
Western Kentucky Hilltoppers (Ohio Valley Conference) (1978–1980)
1978–79	Western Kentucky	17–11	7–5	T–2nd	
1979–80	Western Kentucky	21–8	10–2	T–1st	NCAA Division I First Round
Western Kentucky:		38–19 (.667)	17–7 (.708)		
Purdue Boilermakers (Big Ten Conference) (1980–2005)
1980–81	Purdue	21–11	10–8	4th	NIT Third Place
1981–82	Purdue	18–14	11–7	5th	NIT Runner-up
1982–83	Purdue	21–9	11–7	T–2nd	NCAA Division I Second Round
1983–84	Purdue	22–7	15–3	T–1st	NCAA Division I Second Round
1984–85	Purdue	20–9	11–7	T–3rd	NCAA Division I First Round
1985–86	Purdue	22–10	11–7	T–4th	NCAA Division I Second Round
1986–87	Purdue	25–5	15–3	T–1st	NCAA Division I Second Round
1987–88	Purdue	29–4	16–2	1st	NCAA Division I NCAA Sweet 16
1988–89	Purdue	15–16	8–10	T–6th	
1989–90	Purdue	22–8	13–5	2nd	NCAA Division I Second Round
1990–91	Purdue	17–12	9–9	T–5th	NCAA Division I First Round
1991–92	Purdue	18–15	8–10	T–6th	NIT Quarterfinal
1992–93	Purdue	18–10	9–9	T–5th	NCAA Division I First Round
1993–94	Purdue	29–5	14–4	1st	NCAA Division I Elite Eight
1994–95	Purdue	25–7	15–3	1st	NCAA Division I Second Round
1995–96	Purdue	26–6*	15–3*	1st	NCAA Division I Second Round
1996–97	Purdue	18–12	12–6	2nd	NCAA Division I Second Round
1997–98	Purdue	28–8	12–4	3rd	NCAA Division I NCAA Sweet 16
1998–99	Purdue	21–13	7–9	7th	NCAA Division I NCAA Sweet 16
1999–00	Purdue	24–10	12–4	2nd	NCAA Division I Elite Eight
2000–01	Purdue	17–15	6–10	8th	NIT Quarterfinal
2001–02	Purdue	13–18	5–11	T–8th	
2002–03	Purdue	19–11	10–6	T–3rd	NCAA Division I Second Round
2003–04	Purdue	17–14	7–9	T–7th	NIT First Round
2004–05	Purdue	7–21	3–13	10th	
Purdue:		512–270 (.655)	265–169 (.611)		
Total:		550–289 (.656)			
National champion Postseason invitational champion Conference regular season champion Conference regular season and conference tournament champion Division regular season champion Division regular season and conference tournament champion Conference tournament champion

*The NCAA forfeited 18 regular season wins (6 conference wins) and vacated 1 NCAA Tournament win and 1 NCAA Tournament loss from Purdue's record due to use of an ineligible player for during the 1995–96 season. The records of the Big Ten and Purdue do not reflect this forfeiture.
