= Lillian M. Mitchner =

American temperance leader; writer (1862/64–1954)

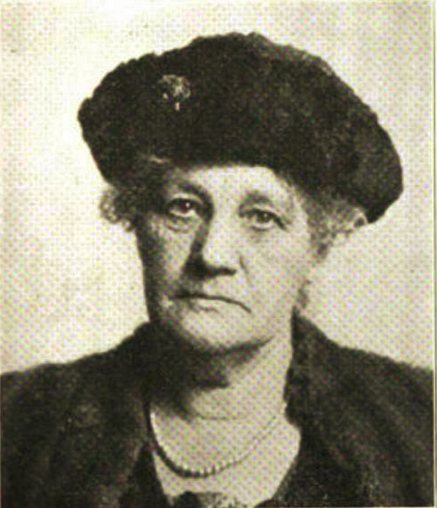
- Portrait photo from Standard encyclopedia of the alcohol problem, 1928
- Born: Lillian May Early; April 10, 1862/64; Adel, Iowa, U.S.
- Died: August 15, 1954; Topeka, Kansas, U.S.
- Resting place: Newton, Kansas, U.S.
- Other name: "Lillie"
- Occupations: Social reformer associated with the temperance and suffrage movements
- Known for: President, Kansas State Woman's Christian Temperance Union

Lillian M. Mitchner (née, Early; 1862/64-1954) was an American social reformer associated with the temperance and suffrage movements. She served as President of the Kansas State Woman's Christian Temperance Union (WCTU) for 28 years (emeritus from 1938), and Superintendent of the Kansas Industrial School for Girls.

== Early life and education ==
Lillian (nickname, "Lillie") May Early was born at Adel, Iowa, April 10, 1862/64. Joseph Carr Early (1834–1900) and Mary Ann (née, Talboys) (b. 1843). Lillian had three sisters: Mary, Mattie, and Elizabeth.

She was educated in the high school of Lafayette, Indiana.

== Career ==
She married Charles W. Mitchner, of Brookston, Indiana, in 1882, and removed to Newton, Kansas, where her husband engaged in the grocery business. They had two sons: Bert and Jay. In 1903, they removed to Baldwin City, Kansas, and in 1910 to Topeka, Kansas where they since resided. Mr. Mitchner became connected with the Extension Department of Kansas Agricultural College.

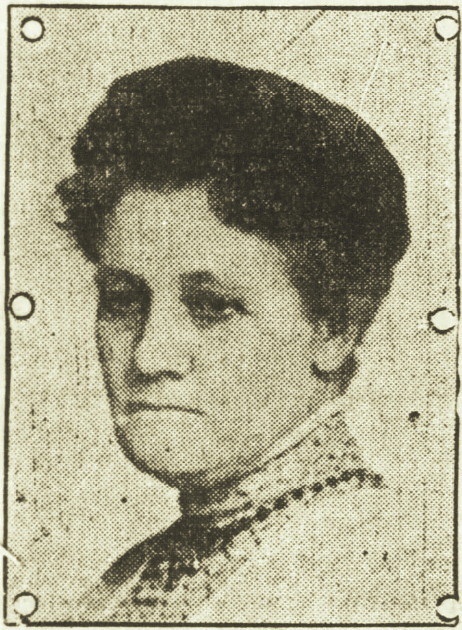
The Topeka Daily Capital, 1914

Mitchner was active in temperance work for more than 25 years, during the whole of which period she held official positions in the Kansas WCTU, having served as State corresponding secretary, State recording secretary, district superintendent, and State President (1910–1938). As leader of the Kansas WCTU, she was a recognized power in legislative work, and rendered important service to the cause of temperance and to the State generally. She was well known as a forceful lecturer, and addressed temperance meetings throughout the western and southern States, spending three months in Oregon, Washington, California, and Colorado in 1914. Many of her speeches were made from automobiles, and on the street corners of the larger cities.

Mitchner was a scientific writer, and editor of Our Messenger, the official organ of the Kansas Union.

Mitchner was elected President of the Kansas State WCTU at the convention in 1910, which voted to make equal suffrage the principal work of the entire organization until it should be won in Kansas, and her efforts were largely in that direction, both in the legislature and among the voters. She was the author of several leaflets on suffrage, and of a suffrage and legislative drill. Mitchner was a leader in the movement which secured equal suffrage from the Kansas Legislature.

"I could never have done anything I did if it hadn't been for the loyal support of 10,000 women." -L. M. Mitchner (The Hutchinson News, October 9, 1938)

She was Temperance Secretary of the Home Missionary Society of the Kansas Conference of the Methodist Episcopal Church (MEC), a member of the Good Government Club, secretary of the Kansas Council of Women, district president of the Woman's Kansas Day Club, and a member of the Mayor's Advisory Council of Topeka. She was appointed one of the official visitors to the penal and charitable institutions of Kansas by Governor George H. Hodges, and was an honorary member of the American Peace Century Committee for the celebration of the One Hundredth Anniversary of Peace Among English-speaking people (1914–15).

In 1914, Mitchner was appointed Superintendent of the Kansas Industrial School for Girls by Governor Arthur Capper. She resigned in 1919 subsequent to an investigation into the management of the school occurred after two students tried to escape after an unsuccessful attempt to burn one of the buildings.

== Death ==
Lillian Mitchner died August 15, 1954, at the Methodist home at Topeka, Kansas, with burial at Newton, Kansas.
