= Victor, Kansas =

Ghost town in Mitchell County, Kansas

- Ghost town
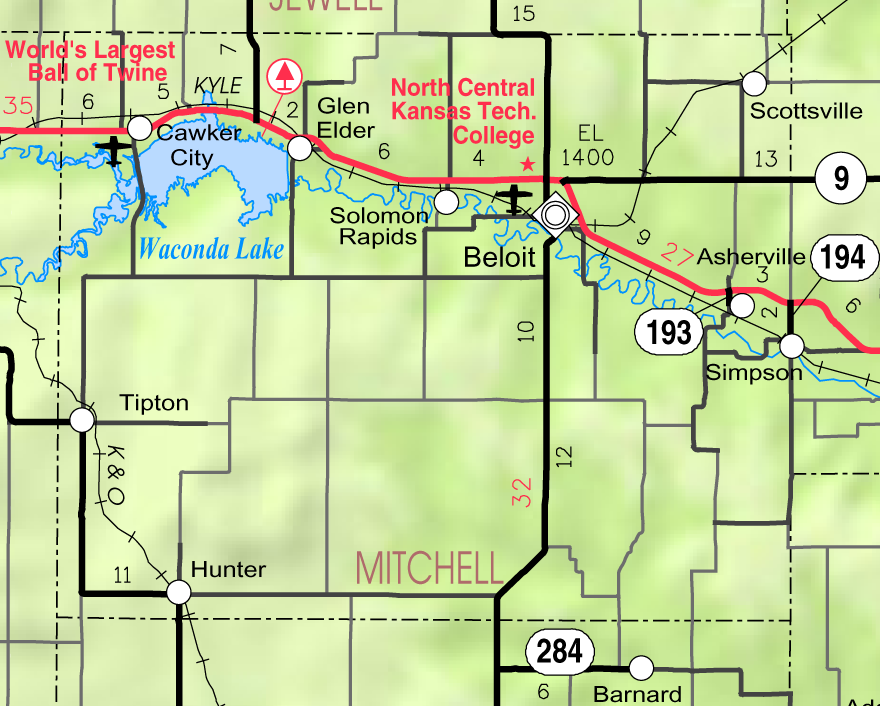
- KDOT map of Mitchell County (legend)

- Location within Kansas Location within the United States
- Coordinates: 39°14′53″N 98°17′02″W
- Country: United States
- State: Kansas
- County: Mitchell
- Elevation: 1,496 ft (456 m)

Population
  - Total: 0
- Time zone: UTC-6 (CST)
  - Summer (DST): UTC-5 (CDT)
- Area code: 785
- FIPS code: 20-73740
- GNIS ID: 484603

Victor is a ghost town in Blue Hills Township, Mitchell County, Kansas, United States.

== History ==
Victor was issued a post office in 1879. The post office was discontinued in 1941. The population in 1910 was 40.
