= Asherville, Kansas =

Unincorporated community in Mitchell County, Kansas

- Unincorporated community and CDP
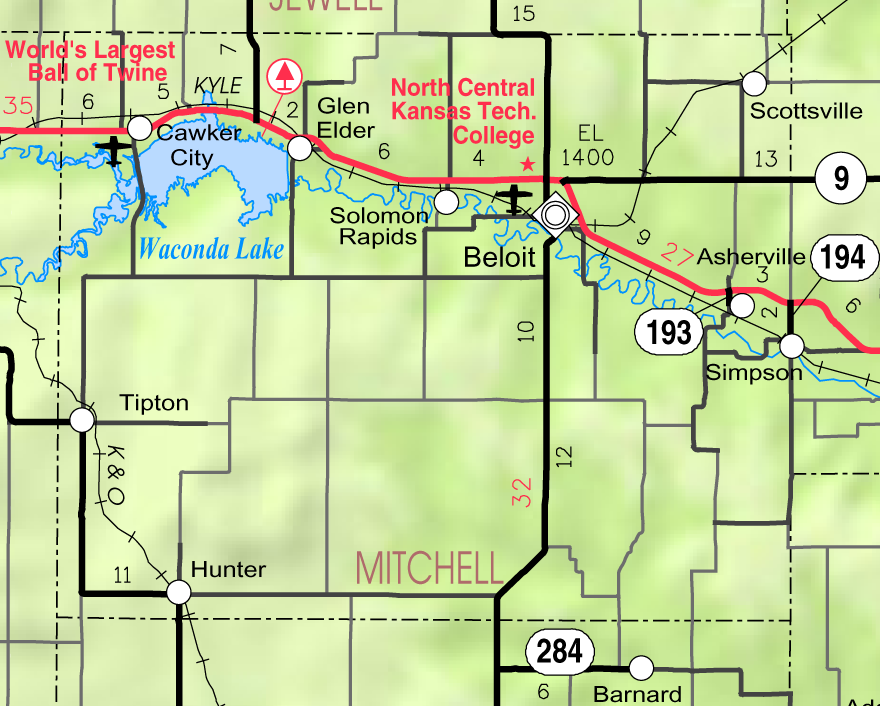
- KDOT map of Mitchell County (legend)

- Location within Kansas Location within the United States
- Coordinates: 39°24′27″N 97°58′24″W
- Country: United States
- State: Kansas
- County: Mitchell
- Founded: 1866
- Elevation: 1,345 ft (410 m)

Population (2020)
  - Total: 19
- Time zone: UTC-6 (CST)
  - Summer (DST): UTC-5 (CDT)
- Area code: 785
- FIPS code: 20-02600
- GNIS ID: 2583497

Asherville is an unincorporated community and census-designated place (CDP) in Mitchell County, Kansas, United States. As of the 2020 census, the population was 19.

== History ==
The first settlement at Asherville was made in 1866 at the Asher Creek, from which the community takes its name. By 1910, Asherville had about 125 inhabitants.

Asherville had the oldest post office in Mitchell County. It opened in 1869, and remained in operation until it was discontinued in 1980.

== Demographics ==
Historical population
Census	Pop.	Note	%±
2020	19		—
U.S. Decennial Census

== Education ==
The community is served by Beloit USD 273 public school district.
