= Kansas Industrial School for Girls =

Reformatory for juvenile girls in Kansas

Beloit Juvenile Correctional Facility
- Former names: Youth Center at Beloit, Kansas Industrial School for Girls
- Active: February 1, 1888–August 28, 2009
- Affiliations: Kansas Juvenile Justice Authority
- Location: 39.4758°N 98.1087°W

The Kansas Industrial School for Girls was established on February 1, 1888, in Beloit, Kansas by the Women's Christian Temperance Union. The State of Kansas took over the operations in 1889. The school was one of the longest operating reformatories for juvenile girls, having been open for 121 years. Other names for the school include the State Industrial School for Girls, the Kansas Girls' Industrial School, the Youth Center at Beloit, and the Beloit Juvenile Correctional Facility.

== History ==
When the State of Kansas acquired the Girls' School, the institution sat on 80 acres of land North of the then-current city limits of Beloit, Kansas. By 1926, the school included 200 acres of farmland. Girls who were committed to the school were deemed in need of correctional work by Kansas courts. In the early years of the school, girls were taught a variety of subjects including domestic arts, healthcare, fine arts, religious instruction, and school subjects. They were involved in the daily operations of the farm, garden, and kitchen. Girls also hosted and organized holiday events, such as the Independence Day Parade in 1938.

The school implemented a cottage system of housing in 1908. This allowed the girls to have a greater amount of freedom while remaining under the careful watch of the officer in charge.

The school's first parole officer, Emma Sells Marshall, gave her first report in the 1914 Biennial Report of the school.

In 1919, an investigation into the management of the school occurred after two students tried to escape following an unsuccessful attempt to burn one of the buildings. The superintendent, Lillian M. Mitchner, subsequently resigned.

In December 1945, the school's Administration Building, which had housed employee apartments, girls' dorms, offices, and the chapel, was lost to a fire. The building was original to the state's acquisition of the school, having been donated by the city of Beloit in 1890. Though the state originally allotted $135,000 for the reconstruction of the building in 1945, ground could not be broken. Construction on the new building started during the 1948-1950 biennium. The new Administration-Dormitory Building was completed in 1952.

A TV special was made about the school entitled "Beloit--Girls with Hope" which was directed by Charles G. Gardiner and aired on KTVH.

According to the Handbook for Students and Parents published by the school in 1972, the girls would first arrive to the school with their parents. Both parents and girls were introduced to staff and given a tour of the facility. The girl would then be separated from her parents, given an interview, and then be settled into one of the three first-level admissions cottages, where they would stay for nine to twelve months. After that initial time period, in which girls would receive various medical, psychological, and educational tests, they would be moved to the Grandview second-level cottage, where they would begin evaluations to be released home. This cottage came with an extra level of freedom. The third-level cottage, Prairie Vista Cottage, provided more treatment for girls who had a difficult time adjusting. Parents were not allowed to visit their daughters at the school until the social worker had approved visitation rights. Boyfriends were not allowed to visit.

The school name changed to the Youth Center at Beloit on July 1, 1974.

The 100th Anniversary Celebration for the center was held on February 9, 1990. This celebration included a ribbon cutting, a presentation of the center's history, and a speech by the then-current president of the Kansas Women's Christian Temperance Union. Former residents of the school returned to the center to catalogue how their time spent at the Youth Center had been valuable in their lives. The Youth Center also hosted the annual Women's Christian Temperance Union's state convention in September of that same year.

The center's name officially changed for the last time to The Beloit Juvenile Correctional Facility on July 1, 1997. The facility also switched state governing agencies from the Child Welfare System to the Kansas Juvenile Justice Authority at this time.

The Beloit Juvenile Correctional Facility was closed by the state in 2009 due to its decreasing need and high cost. Those who were still housed at the school at its closing were moved to the Kansas Juvenile Correctional Complex in Topeka, Kansas.

== Education ==
In her 1922 Biennial report, Superintendent Lyda J. McMahon alludes to the idea that the school's academic department was lacking upon her arrival to the school. Temporary school rooms were set up in the school's Administration Building and Lula Coyner was appointed the school principal.

By 1924, the school's academic work was divided into a morning and an afternoon session. Girls from the third through the ninth grade were taught subjects such as reading, arithmetic, history, English, physiology, and home nursing. Average class size at this time was fifteen to twenty students.

To combat the cycle of abuse, the Youth Center implemented parenting classes in the Spring of 1980. The program was originally started by the normal educational staff with the intent that it be taken over by a full-time instructor.

== Treatments ==
By 1966, the school was no longer considered a place of punishment for incarcerated girls, but became an institution more focused on the healthy mental and emotional development of the girls and to give them the foundation needed to enter society. The four areas of treatment at this time were academic, vocational, milieu therapy, and psychotherapy.

The first comprehensive annual report of the Youth Center at Beloit was filed in 1985. This report details the treatments used by the school including room confinement and security and seclusion control. These measures were put in place to allow students to calm down or to protect students from themselves and others. The report states that these confinements were monitored by staff. The longest use of the security status for a student in 1985 was 248 hours.

Approximately 30 documented assaults on staff were carried out by residents of the center in 1990. Because of this increase in physical violence, the center introduced Aggression Replacement Training (ART) led by Greg Peak, the center's Psychologist I.

=== Sterilizations ===
The first forced sterilization law was passed in Kansas in 1913. It was later repealed and replaced on February 27, 1917, by Chapter 205 of the Kansas statutes. The Revised Statutes of Kansas for 1923 mentioned the girls' school in sections 76-149 and 76–155, which gave the school and seven other institutions legal power to sterilize inmates. Under these laws and statutes, 71 inmates of the Girls' Industrial School were recommended for sterilization and 62 inmates of the Girls' Industrial School received sterilization operations by 1936. The sterilizations were carried out at Lansing Correctional Facility in Lansing, Kansas, then called the Women's Industrial Farm. Lula Coyner, the superintendent of the school from 1926 to 1936, cited venereal diseases and other physical and mental illnesses as the deciding factor in these sterilizations. Coyner was replaced by superintendent Blanche Peterson shortly after the sterilizations were reported. Peterson did not mention the sterilizations nor the subsequent media coverage of the sterilizations in her 1938 biennial report.

Recommendations for sterilization were made by Dr. George A. Kelly and his associates from Fort Hays State University—then Fort Hays Kansas State College—who held psychology clinics for the inmates of the girls' school at the request of administration. Dr. Kelly continued to work with the girls' school through the 1938 biennium.

Kansas congresswoman Kathryn O'Loughlin McCarthy condemned the sterilizations in 1937 in a newspaper article. The article started a national conversation about the ethics of forced sterilization on young women. McCarthy called for the State of Kansas to begin an investigation into the sterilizations, alleging that parents had not given consent for their daughters to be operated on and that the reasons behind the sterilizations didn't fall in line with state standards. The sterilizations at the girls' school were condemned by the Franklin D. Roosevelt Club in Kansas City, Kansas in November 1937.

The sterilization of inmates of Kansas prisons remained legal until 1965.
