= Beloit Junior-Senior High School =

High school in Beloit, Kansas

Location
- 1711 North Walnut Street, Beloit, Kansas; United States
- Coordinates: 39°28′40.76″N 98°6′20.87″W

Information
- Other name: Beloit Jr-Sr High
- Type: Public high school
- School district: Beloit USD 273
- Principal: Casey Seyfert
- Teaching staff: 34.20 (on an FTE basis)
- Grades: 7–12
- Enrollment: 362 (2023–2024)
- Student to teacher ratio: 10.58
- Color(s)
- Mascot: Trojan

Beloit Junior-Senior High School is an American public high school in Beloit, Kansas. The school is part of unified school district (USD) 273.

The school has around 370 students, of which 5 percent are minorities. US News states 74 percent of students are proficient in math and 80 percent are proficient in English. The school has 33 full-time teachers and 93 percent of students graduate.

== Notable people ==
- Alpha Brumage, former American football player
- Gene Keady, American Hall of Fame basketball coach who began his coaching career at the school
