= Coursens Grove, Kansas =

Ghost town in Mitchell County, Kansas

- Ghost town
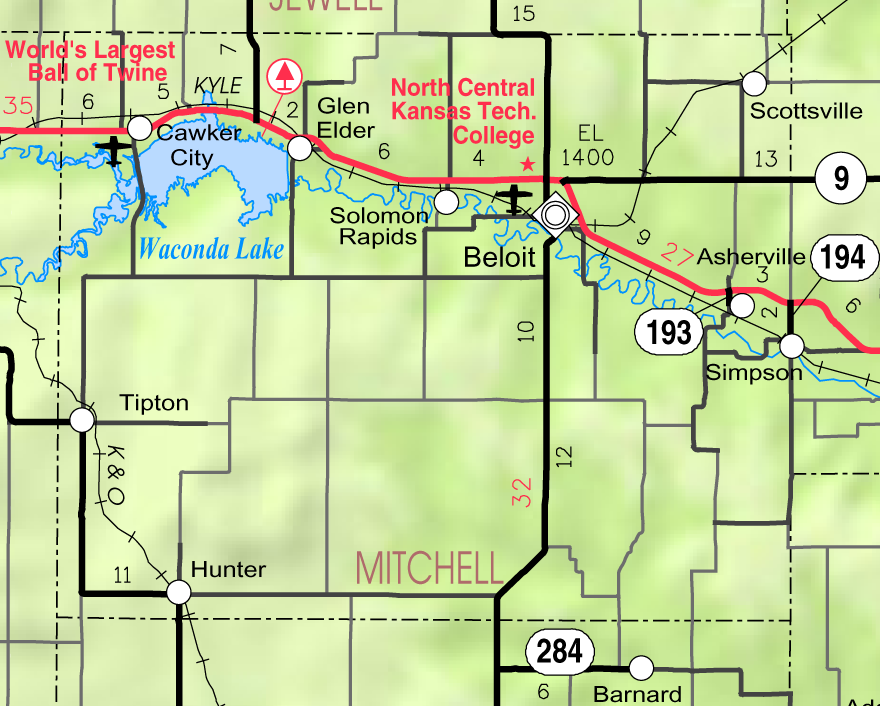
- KDOT map of Mitchell County (legend)

- Location within Kansas Location within the United States
- Coordinates: 39°16′36″N 97°58′08″W
- Country: United States
- State: Kansas
- County: Mitchell
- Elevation: 1,558 ft (475 m)

Population
  - Total: 0
- Time zone: UTC-6 (CST)
  - Summer (DST): UTC-5 (CDT)
- Area code: 785
- FIPS code: 20-16015
- GNIS ID: 484950

Coursens Grove is a ghost town in Eureka Township, Mitchell County, Kansas, United States.

== History ==
Coursens Grove was issued a post office in 1874. The post office was discontinued in 1895.
