= West Asher, Kansas =

Ghost town in Mitchell County, Kansas

- Ghost town
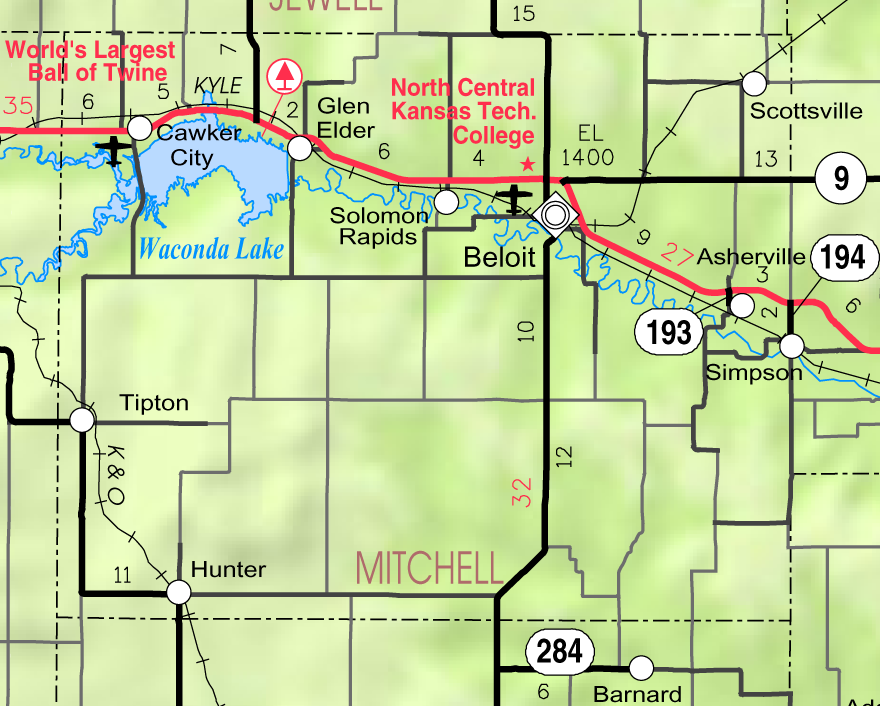
- KDOT map of Mitchell County (legend)

- Location within Kansas Location within the United States
- Coordinates: 39°28′52″N 97°58′36″W
- Country: United States
- State: Kansas
- County: Mitchell
- Elevation: 1,509 ft (460 m)

Population
  - Total: 0
- Time zone: UTC-6 (CST)
  - Summer (DST): UTC-5 (CDT)
- Area code: 785
- GNIS ID: 482378

West Asher is a ghost town in Lulu Township, Mitchell County, Kansas, United States.

== History ==
West Asher was issued a post office in 1878. The post office was discontinued in 1888.
