= Solomon Rapids, Kansas =

Unincorporated community in Mitchell County, Kansas

- Unincorporated community
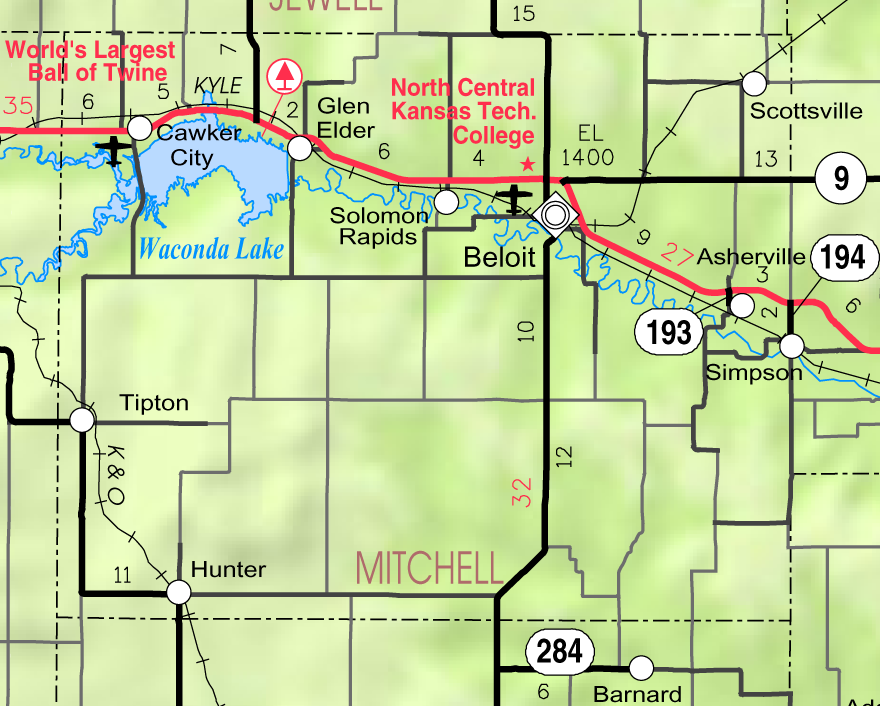
- KDOT map of Mitchell County (legend)

- Location within Kansas Location within the United States
- Coordinates: 39°28′25″N 98°11′33″W
- Country: United States
- State: Kansas
- County: Mitchell
- Elevation: 1,394 ft (425 m)
- Time zone: UTC-6 (CST)
  - Summer (DST): UTC-5 (CDT)
- Area code: 785
- FIPS code: 20-66425
- GNIS ID: 472328

Solomon Rapids is an unincorporated community in Mitchell County, Kansas, United States.

== History ==
A post office was opened in Solomon Rapids in 1870, and remained in operation until it was discontinued in 1953. The community took its name from rapids on the nearby Solomon River.

== Education ==
The community is served by Beloit USD 273 public school district.

== See also ==
- Waconda Lake and Glen Elder State Park.
