= Elaine Bowers =

American politician (born 1963)

Member of the Kansas Senate from the 36th district
- Incumbent
- Assumed office January 9, 2013
- Preceded by: Allen Schmidt

Member of the Kansas House of Representatives from the 107th district
- In office January 10, 2007 – January 8, 2013
- Preceded by: Joann Lee Freeborn
- Succeeded by: Susan Concannon

Personal details
- Born: February 12, 1963 (age 63) Beloit, Kansas, U.S.
- Party: Republican
- Spouse: Charlie Bowers
- Children: 4
- Education: Cloud County Community College (1983)
- Profession: Auto dealer
- Website: www.elainebowers.com

Elaine Bowers (born February 12, 1963) is a Republican member of the Kansas Senate, representing the 36th district since 2013.

Prior to her election to the Senate, Bowers was a member of the Kansas House of Representatives, representing the 107th district. She was elected in 2007. Before that, Bowers worked as an executive secretary for the Concordia Chamber of Commerce and currently is the office manager for Concordia Auto Mart Inc.

She is a member of the American Legion Auxiliary, Girl State Program, Independent Auto Dealers Association, National Auto Dealers Association and Rotary International Club. She currently is the National Federation of Women Legislators Kansas State Director.

== Committee membership ==
Senator Bowers currently serves on the following legislative committees:

- 2015 Special Committee on Insurance
- Agriculture
- Capitol Preservation Committee
- Financial Institutions and Insurance (Vice-chair)
- Joint Committee on State-Tribal Relations
- Public Health and Welfare
- Senate Select Committee on the Kansas Public Employee Retirement System {KPERS}

== Major donors ==
The top 5 donors to Bowers's 2008 campaign:

1. Kansas Contractors Assoc $1,000
2. Koch Industries $900
3. Prairie Band Potawatomi Nation $750
4. AT&T $500
5. Twin Valley Telephone Inc $500
