= Walnut Grove, Kansas =

Ghost town in Mitchell County, Kansas

- Ghost town
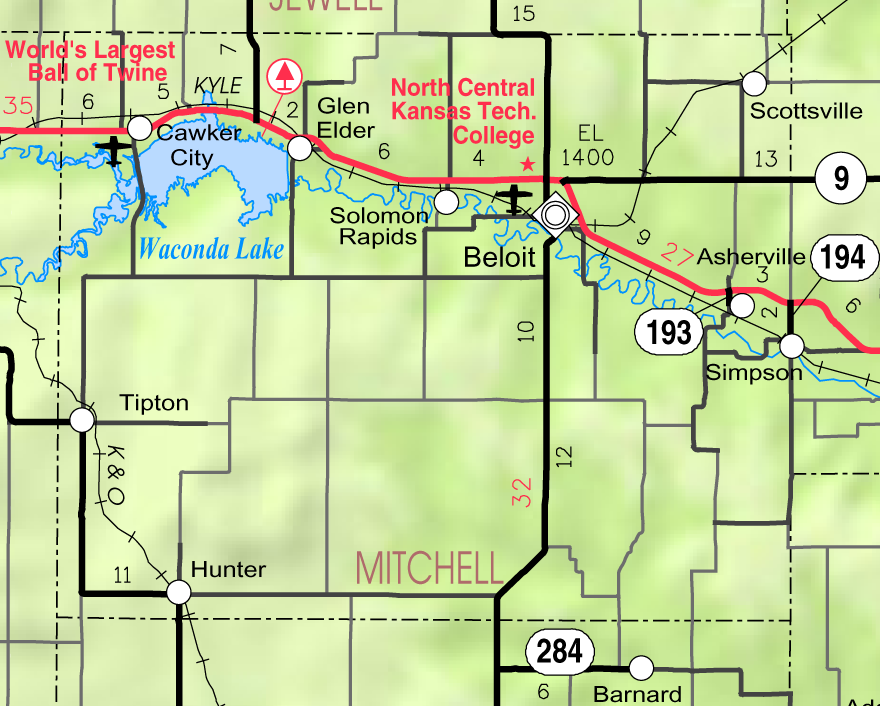
- KDOT map of Mitchell County (legend)

- Location within Kansas Location within the United States
- Coordinates: 39°21′02″N 98°03′36″W
- Country: United States
- State: Kansas
- County: Mitchell
- Elevation: 1,489 ft (454 m)

Population
  - Total: 0
- Time zone: UTC-6 (CST)
  - Summer (DST): UTC-5 (CDT)
- Area code: 785
- GNIS ID: 482031

Walnut Grove is a ghost town in Mitchell County, Kansas, United States.

== History ==
There were two settlements in Mitchell County with the name Walnut Grove. The first was in Hayes Township with a post office from 1876 to 1881. In 1886, Walnut Grove in Bloomfield Township was issued a post office. This post office was renamed Walnutgrove in 1894, then discontinued in 1901.
