= Susan Concannon =

American politician

Member of the Kansas House of Representatives from the 107th district
- In office January 14, 2013 – January 13, 2025
- Preceded by: Elaine Bowers
- Succeeded by: Dawn Wolf

Personal details
- Born: July 23, 1958 (age 68) Salina, Kansas, U.S.
- Party: Republican
- Spouse: Craig
- Children: 3
- Education: Bethany College

Susan Concannon (born July 23, 1958) is an American politician who served as a Republican member of the Kansas House of Representatives from the 107th district from 2013 to 2025.

In 2024, Concannon notably changed her position on Kansas Senate Bill 233, a bill barring access to gender-affirming care for young transgender people in Kansas. She voted in favor of the bill before it was vetoed by Kansas Governor Laura Kelly, but against overturning Kelly's veto, citing concerns about government overreach and vague language in the bill. Concannon was one of two Republicans in the Kansas House of Representatives who changed their position, the other being Jesse Borjon of Topeka. Had either not done so, the Republican motion to override Gov. Kelly's veto would have succeeded. She did not run for re-election in 2024.
