= Scottsville, Kansas =

City in Mitchell County, Kansas

- City
- Location within Mitchell County and Kansas

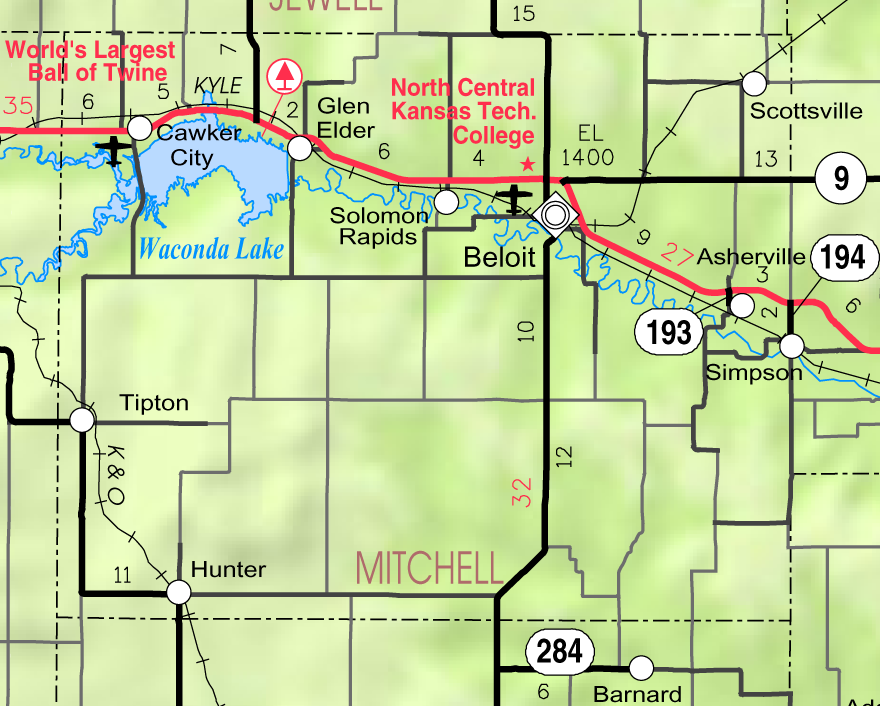
- KDOT map of Mitchell County (legend)
- Coordinates: 39°32′33″N 97°57′08″W
- Country: United States
- State: Kansas
- County: Mitchell
- Founded: 1870s
- Platted: 1878
- Incorporated: 1907
- Named for: Tom Scott

Area
  - Total: 0.25 sq mi (0.65 km^{2})
  - Land: 0.25 sq mi (0.65 km^{2})
  - Water: 0 sq mi (0.00 km^{2})
- Elevation: 1,558 ft (475 m)

Population (2020)
  - Total: 26
  - Density: 100/sq mi (40/km^{2})
- Time zone: UTC-6 (CST)
  - Summer (DST): UTC-5 (CDT)
- ZIP Code: 67420
- Area code: 785
- FIPS code: 20-63650
- GNIS ID: 2396561

Scottsville is a city in Mitchell County, Kansas, United States. As of the 2020 census, the population of the city was 26.

== History ==
Scottsville was platted in October 1878 when the railroad was extended to that point. It was named for Tom Scott, a pioneer settler.

The post office in Scottsville was discontinued in 1967.

== Geography ==
According to the United States Census Bureau, the city has a total area of 0.25 square miles (0.65 km^{2}), all of it land.

== Demographics ==
Historical population
Census	Pop.	Note	%±
1880	95		—
1910	248		—
1920	165		−33.5%
1930	169		2.4%
1940	187		10.7%
1950	108		−42.2%
1960	60		−44.4%
1970	46		−23.3%
1980	56		21.7%
1990	26		−53.6%
2000	21		−19.2%
2010	25		19.0%
2020	26		4.0%
U.S. Decennial Census

=== 2010 census ===
As of the census of 2010, there were 25 people, 11 households, and 7 families residing in the city. The population density was 100.0 inhabitants per square mile (38.6/km^{2}). There were 15 housing units at an average density of 60.0 per square mile (23.2/km^{2}). The racial makeup of the city was 96.0% White and 4.0% from two or more races.

There were 11 households, of which 27.3% had children under the age of 18 living with them, 63.6% were married couples living together, and 36.4% were non-families. 36.4% of all households were made up of individuals, and 18.2% had someone living alone who was 65 years of age or older. The average household size was 2.27 and the average family size was 3.00.

The median age in the city was 40.8 years. 28% of residents were under the age of 18; 0.0% were between the ages of 18 and 24; 28% were from 25 to 44; 36% were from 45 to 64; and 8% were 65 years of age or older. The gender makeup of the city was 56.0% male and 44.0% female.

=== 2000 census ===
As of the census of 2000, there were 21 people, 8 households, and 7 families residing in the city. The population density was 83.9 inhabitants per square mile (32.4/km^{2}). There were 12 housing units at an average density of 48.0 per square mile (18.5/km^{2}). The racial makeup of the city was 90.48% White, and 9.52% from two or more races.

There were 8 households, out of which 50.0% had children under the age of 18 living with them, 75.0% were married couples living together, and 12.5% were non-families. 12.5% of all households were made up of individuals, and none had someone living alone who was 65 years of age or older. The average household size was 2.63 and the average family size was 2.86.

In the city, the population was spread out, with 23.8% under the age of 18, 14.3% from 18 to 24, 28.6% from 25 to 44, 14.3% from 45 to 64, and 19.0% who were 65 years of age or older. The median age was 40 years. For every 100 females, there were 133.3 males. For every 100 females age 18 and over, there were 166.7 males.

The median income for a household in the city was $28,750, and the median income for a family was $38,333. Males had a median income of $26,250 versus $11,250 for females. The per capita income for the city was $13,624. None of the population and none of the families were below the poverty line.

== Education ==
The community is served by Beloit USD 273 public school district.
