= Simpson, Kansas =

City in Mitchell and Cloud Counties in Kansas

- City
- Location within Cloud County and Kansas

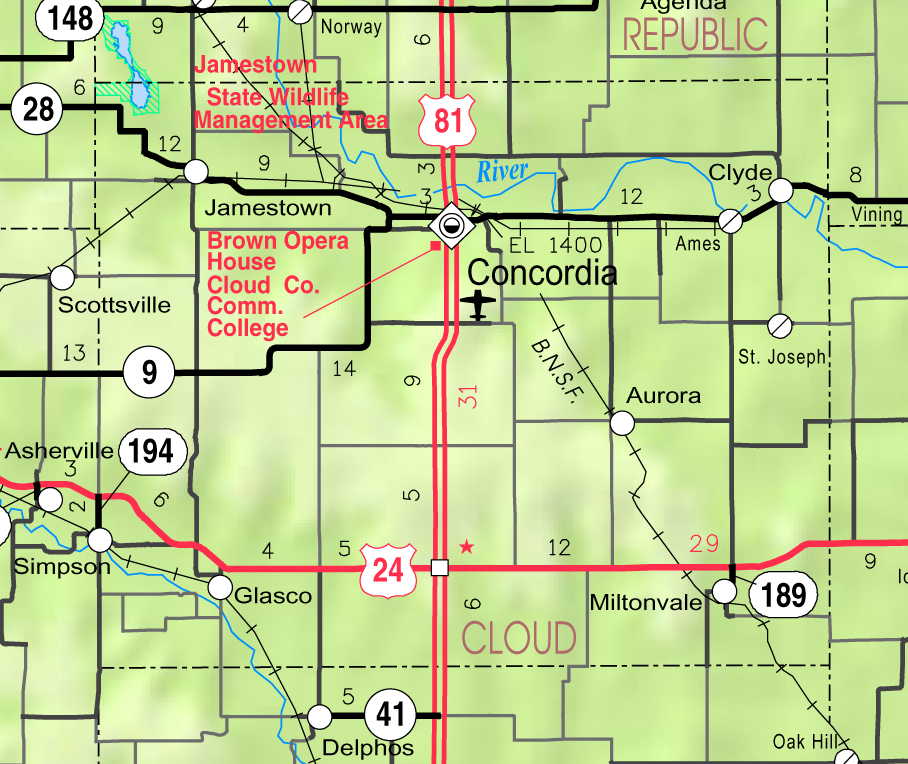
- KDOT map of Cloud County (legend)
- Coordinates: 39°23′10″N 97°56′02″W
- Country: United States
- State: Kansas
- Counties: Mitchell, Cloud
- Founded: 1871
- Incorporated: 1907
- Named for: Alfred Simpson

Area
  - Total: 0.26 sq mi (0.67 km^{2})
  - Land: 0.26 sq mi (0.67 km^{2})
  - Water: 0 sq mi (0.00 km^{2})
- Elevation: 1,335 ft (407 m)

Population (2020)
  - Total: 82
  - Density: 320/sq mi (120/km^{2})
- Time zone: UTC-6 (CST)
  - Summer (DST): UTC-5 (CDT)
- ZIP Code: 67478
- Area code: 785
- FIPS code: 20-65650
- GNIS ID: 2395891

Simpson is a city in Cloud and Mitchell counties in Kansas, United States. As of the 2020 census, the population of the city was 82.

== History ==
Simpson was originally called Brittsville, and under the latter name had its start in 1871 when a saw mill opened at the site. The present name was adopted in 1882 in honor of Alfred Simpson, an original landowner.

The first post office at Brittsville, established in June 1874, was renamed Simpson in April 1882.

== Geography ==
According to the United States Census Bureau, the city has a total area of 0.25 square miles (0.65 km^{2}), all of it land.

== Demographics ==
Historical population
Census	Pop.	Note	%±
1910	211		—
1920	295		39.8%
1930	273		−7.5%
1940	235		−13.9%
1950	234		−0.4%
1960	154		−34.2%
1970	131		−14.9%
1980	123		−6.1%
1990	107		−13.0%
2000	114		6.5%
2010	86		−24.6%
2020	82		−4.7%
U.S. Decennial Census

=== 2010 census ===
As of the census of 2010, there were 86 people, 36 households, and 26 families living in the city. The population density was 344.0 inhabitants per square mile (132.8/km^{2}). There were 61 housing units at an average density of 244.0 per square mile (94.2/km^{2}). The racial makeup of the city was 98.8% White and 1.2% from two or more races.

There were 36 households, of which 27.8% had children under the age of 18 living with them, 63.9% were married couples living together, 2.8% had a female householder with no husband present, 5.6% had a male householder with no wife present, and 27.8% were non-families. 22.2% of all households were made up of individuals, and 13.9% had someone living alone who was 65 years of age or older. The average household size was 2.39 and the average family size was 2.69.

The median age in the city was 45.5 years. 20.9% of residents were under the age of 18; 5.9% were between the ages of 18 and 24; 23.3% were from 25 to 44; 36.1% were from 45 to 64; and 14% were 65 years of age or older. The gender makeup of the city was 52.3% male and 47.7% female.

=== 2000 census ===
As of the census of 2000, there were 114 people, 46 households, and 33 families living in the city. The population density was 475.3 inhabitants per square mile (183.5/km^{2}). There were 58 housing units at an average density of 241.8 per square mile (93.4/km^{2}). The racial makeup of the city was 100.00% White.

There were 46 households, out of which 34.8% had children under the age of 18 living with them, 65.2% were married couples living together, 4.3% had a female householder with no husband present, and 26.1% were non-families. 23.9% of all households were made up of individuals, and 10.9% had someone living alone who was 65 years of age or older. The average household size was 2.48 and the average family size was 2.94.

In the city, the population was spread out, with 27.2% under the age of 18, 7.0% from 18 to 24, 28.1% from 25 to 44, 15.8% from 45 to 64, and 21.9% who were 65 years of age or older. The median age was 38 years. For every 100 females, there were 93.2 males. For every 100 females age 18 and over, there were 107.5 males.

The median income for a household in the city was $25,938, and the median income for a family was $29,375. Males had a median income of $26,607 versus $12,917 for females. The per capita income for the city was $12,868. There were 15.2% of families and 18.8% of the population living below the poverty line, including 50.0% of under eighteens and 10.5% of those over 64.

== Education ==
The community is served by Beloit USD 273 public school district.

Simpson schools were closed through school unification. The Simpson High School mascot was Simpson Coyotes.
