= Beloit USD 273 =

Public school district in Beloit, Kansas

Address
- 2020 N. Independence Ave. Beloit, Kansas, 67420; United States
- Coordinates: 39°28′43″N 98°6′58″W

District information
- Type: Public
- Grades: K to 12
- Schools: 3

Other information
- Website: usd273.org

Beloit USD 273 is a public unified school district headquartered in Beloit, Kansas, United States. It includes Beloit, Randall, Scottsville, Simpson, Asherville, Solomon Rapids, and nearby rural areas.

== Schools ==
The school district operates the following schools:

- Beloit Junior-Senior High School
- Beloit Elementary School

Former schools

- Randall Elementary School

== History ==
In 2009 it had absorbed some territory from Jewel USD 279 due to that district's dissolution.

== See also ==
- Kansas State Department of Education
- Kansas State High School Activities Association
- List of high schools in Kansas
- List of unified school districts in Kansas
