= Kansas's 36th Senate district =

American legislative district

Kansas's 36th State Senate district
Senator
Elaine Bowers; R–Concordia
- Demographics: 94% White; 1% Black; 3% Hispanic; 0% Asian; 2% Other
- Population (2018): 67,277

Kansas's 36th Senate district is one of 40 districts in the Kansas Senate. It has been represented by Republican Elaine Bowers since 2013. It is the most Republican-leaning Senate district in the state.

== Geography ==
District 36 spans the rural northern edge of the state, covering all of Cloud, Jewell, Lincoln, Mitchell, Osborne, Ottawa, Republic, Rooks, Russell, Smith, and Washington counties, as well as parts of Marshall and Phillips counties. Communities in the district include Concordia, Russell, Beloit, Marysville, Minneapolis, Phillipsburg, Belleville, Plainville, Smith Center, Osborne, Lincoln Center, Washington, and Stockton.

The district is located almost entirely within Kansas's 1st congressional district, with a small portion extending into the 2nd district. It overlaps with the 106th, 107th, 109th, and 110th districts of the Kansas House of Representatives. It borders the state of Nebraska.

== Recent election results ==
=== 2020 ===
2020 Kansas Senate election, District 36
Party	Candidate	Votes	%
Republican	Elaine Bowers (incumbent)	31,549	100
Total votes		31,549	100
Republican hold			

=== 2016 ===
2016 Kansas Senate election, District 36
Party	Candidate	Votes	%
Republican	Elaine Bowers (incumbent)	26,816	85.1
Democratic	Brian Angevine	4,686	14.9
Total votes		31,502	100
Republican hold			

=== 2012 ===
2012 Kansas Senate election, District 36
Primary election
Party	Candidate	Votes	%
Republican	Elaine Bowers	9,377	64.3
Republican	Kyle Abbott	5,216	35.7
Total votes		14,593	100
General election
Republican	Elaine Bowers	26,051	82.9
Democratic	Marquis Clark	5,371	17.1
Total votes		31,422	100
Republican gain from Democratic			

=== Federal and statewide results ===
Year	Office	Results
2020	President	Trump 80.9 – 17.2%
2018	Governor	Kobach 59.0 – 29.9%
2016	President	Trump 79.2 – 15.5%
2012	President	Romney 77.8 – 19.9%
