= Lawrence J. Lee =

American politician

Member of the Missouri Senate from the 3rd district
- In office elected 1966 – ?

Personal details
- Born: November 4, 1932 St. Louis, Missouri
- Died: 1991 (aged 58–59)
- Party: Democratic
- Spouse: Joan Margaret Steube
- Children: 5
- Education: Washington University
- Occupation: Politician, lawyer

Lawrence J. Lee (November 4, 1932 in St. Louis, Missouri - 1991) is an American politician who served in the Missouri Senate. In 1964, he was appointed prosecuting attorney of St. Louis. On November 8, 1966, Lee was elected to the Missouri Senate in a special election, where he rose to the position of majority floor leader. He died in 1991.
