= Janis Lee =

American politician

Member of the Kansas Senate from the 36th district
- In office January 9, 1989 – January 2011
- Preceded by: Neil Arasmith
- Succeeded by: Allen Schmidt

Personal details
- Born: July 11, 1945 (age 81) Kensington, Kansas, U.S.
- Party: Democratic
- Spouse: Lyn R. Lee
- Children: 3
- Education: Kansas State University
- Occupation: Rancher; Farmer

Janis K. Lee (born July 11, 1945) was the chief hearing officer for the Kansas Court of Tax Appeals from 2011 until 2013. She was a Democratic member of the Kansas Senate representing the 36th district from 1989 until 2011. She was Assistant Minority (Democratic) Leader of the Kansas Senate from 1997 until her appointment as a hearing officer. She was also the vice-president of the Unified School District 238 Board of Education.

In 2019, she was appointed by Governor Laura Kelly to co-chair the governor's Council on Tax Reform alongside former state Sen. Steve Morris.

== Committee assignments ==
Sen. Lee served on these legislative committees:

- Utilities
- Joint Committee on Administrative Rules and Regulations
- Agriculture
- Joint Committee on Corrections and Juvenile Justice Oversight
- Joint Committee on Energy and Environmental Policy
- Joint Committee on Kansas Security
- Natural Resources
- Ways and Means

== Major donors ==
Some of the top contributors to Sen. Lee's 2008 campaign, according to the National Institute on Money in State Politics:

Kansas Contractors Association, Senate Democrats Committee, Pioneer Communications, Kansas National Education Association, Kansas Bankers Association

Energy and natural resources companies were her largest donor group.
