= Senator Lea (disambiguation) =

Luke Lea (1879–1945) was a U.S. Senator from Tennessee from 1911 to 1917. Senator Lea may also refer to:

- Benjamin J. Lea (1833–1894), Tennessee State Senate
- Pryor Lea (1794–1879), Texas State Senate
