= Senator Lees =

Senator Lees may refer to:

- Brian Lees (born 1953), Massachusetts State Senate
- Robert Lees (politician) (1842–1908), Wisconsin State Senate
