= St. John's Catholic High School (Beloit, Kansas) =

Location
- 209 South Cherry Street; Beloit, Kansas 67420; United States; 39°27′28″N 98°6′4″W

Information
- Type: Private, Coeducational
- Religious affiliation: Roman Catholic
- Established: 1920
- Superintendent: Father Joseph Kieffer
- Principal: Marcy Kee
- Head of school: Marcy Kee
- Chaplain: Father Andrew Rockers
- Grades: 9–12
- Average class size: 11
- Hours in school day: 8
- Colors: Blue and White
- Mascot: Swoop
- Nickname: Jays
- Team name: Blujays
- Rival: Lakeside High School; Rock Hills High School Southern Cloud, Pike Valley
- Accreditation: North Central Association of Colleges and Schools
- Athletic Director: Marcy Kee
- Website: www.gostjohns.com/school

St. John's Catholic High School is a private, Roman Catholic high school in Beloit, Kansas, United States. The school is within the Roman Catholic Diocese of Salina.

== History ==
St.John's Catholic School was established in the fall of 1879 with and initial enrollment of 15 students. housed in a single room building. Growth over the following decades enrollment reached 140 by 1900, Prompting construction of a larger school. Built from a stone quarried locally by area farmers, the building was completed in 1914 under the supervision of a German craftsman.

The high school started in 1920 and occupied the same building until the present high school was built in 1952.

St. John's Catholic Grade School continues to operate as a parish school, combining religious instruction with academic coursework.

In March 2013, St. John's was selected as the Catholic School of the Month. This brought congratulations from Catholic dignitaries, authors, and others.

== See also ==
- List of high schools in Kansas
- List of unified school districts in Kansas
