= Kansas Juvenile Justice Authority =

Kansas juvenile correction agency

Kansas Department of Corrections
- Great Seal of the State of Kansas

Agency overview
- Headquarters: 714 SW Jackson St, Ste 300; Topeka, Kansas
- Agency executive: Ray Roberts, Secretary
- Parent agency: Kansas Department of Corrections
- Website: KDOC Juvenile Services Division

The Kansas Department of Corrections (KDOC) is a state agency of Kansas, headquartered in Suite 300 of 714 S.W. Jackson St. in Topeka. The former agency of the Juvenile Justice Authority (JJA), which began on July 1, 1997, was merged with the Kansas Department of Corrections by Governor Sam Brownback on July 1, 2013, to increase internal efficiencies and provide more secure operations. The KDOC operates the state's juvenile correctional facilities. In 1996, the Kansas Legislature had passed the Juvenile Justice Reform Act, stipulating that only the most chronic, serious, and violent juvenile delinquents are sent to secure juvenile correctional facilities.

== Facilities ==
The Kansas Juvenile Correctional Complex (KJCC) is located in Topeka. KJCC opened and began to gain population in August 2004. The east division is for males, with capacity for 180 male juveniles, while the west division is for females. The west division, with capacity for 64 female juveniles, is the former Segregation units for the Boys. Its residents take classes through Lawrence Gardner High School and Washburn University. All classes are on site.

Former facilities include the Beloit Juvenile Correctional Facility. The facility closed in 2009 and all residents were moved to KJCC.
