= Beloit, Kansas =

City in Mitchell County, Kansas

- City and County seat
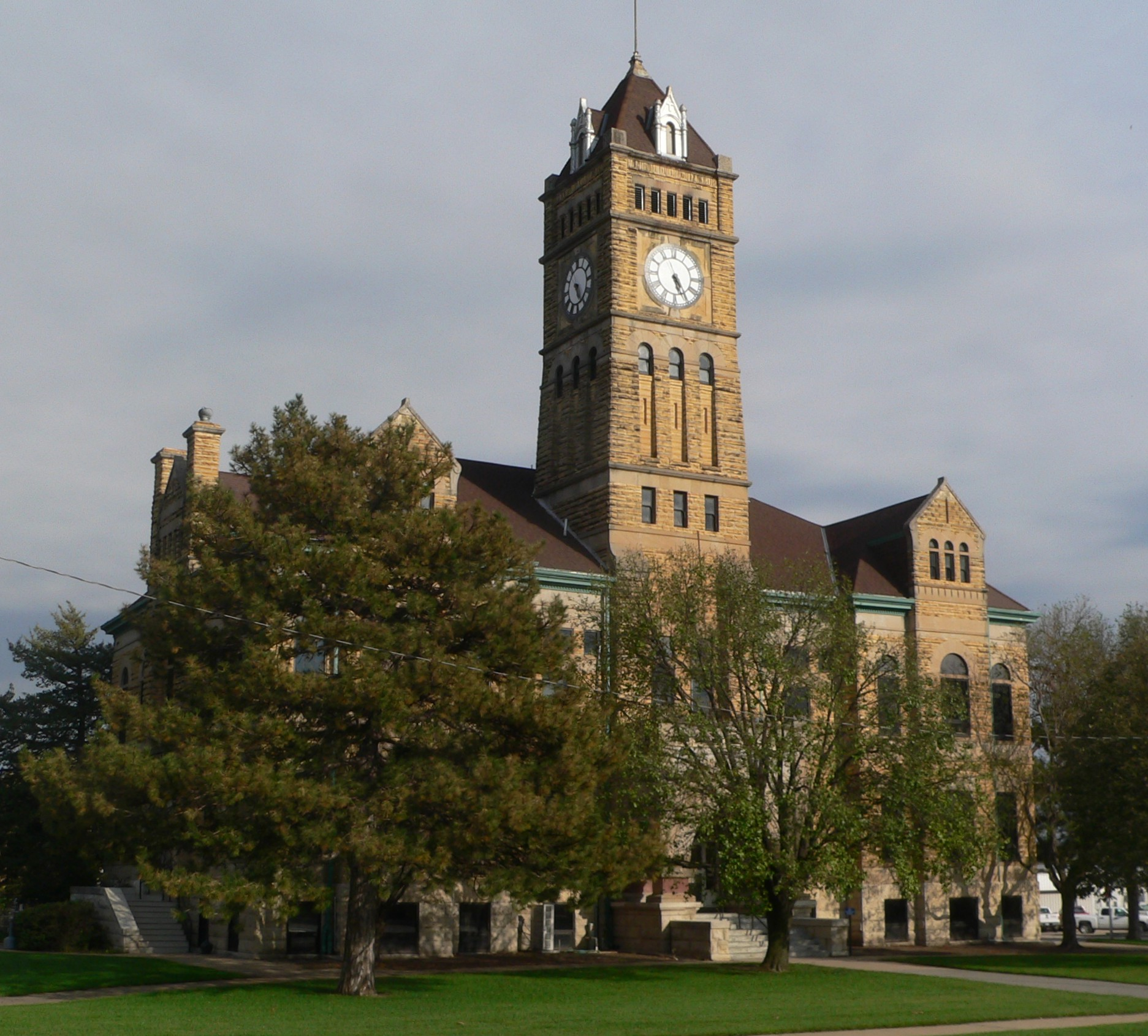
- Mitchell County Courthouse (2014)
- Nickname: "The Heart of the Solomon Valley"
- Location within Mitchell County and Kansas

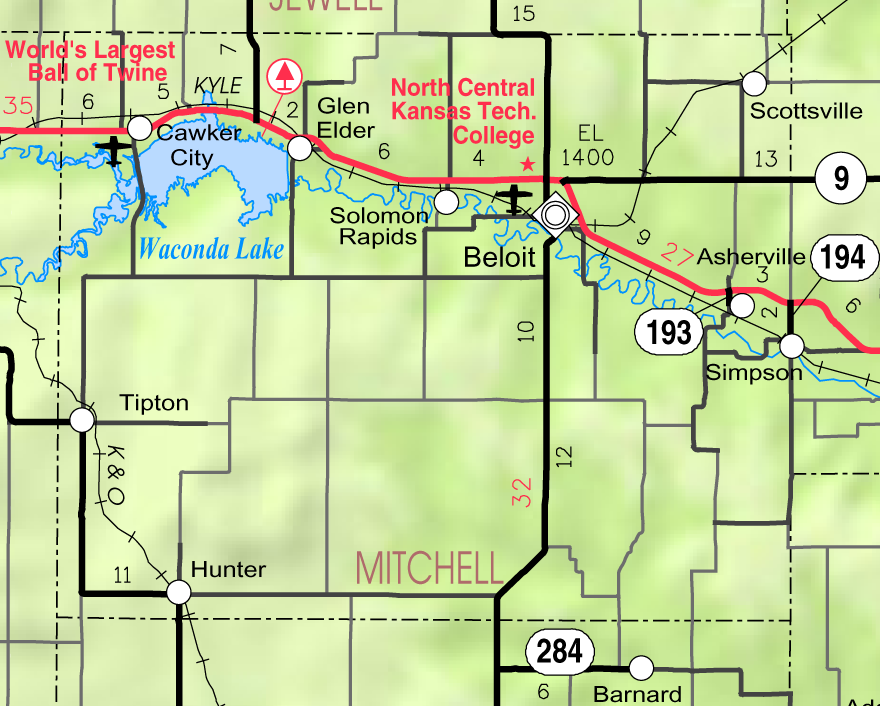
- KDOT map of Mitchell County (legend)
- Coordinates: 39°27′52″N 98°06′30″W
- Country: United States
- State: Kansas
- County: Mitchell
- Platted: 1872
- Incorporated: 1872

Government
  - Type: Mayor–Council
  - Mayor: Tom Naasz

Area
  - Total: 3.94 sq mi (10.21 km^{2})
  - Land: 3.92 sq mi (10.14 km^{2})
  - Water: 0.027 sq mi (0.07 km^{2})
- Elevation: 1,434 ft (437 m)

Population (2020)
  - Total: 3,404
  - Density: 869.5/sq mi (335.7/km^{2})
- Time zone: UTC−6 (CST)
  - Summer (DST): UTC−5 (CDT)
- ZIP Code: 67420
- Area code: 785
- FIPS code: 20-05775
- GNIS ID: 485547
- Website: beloitks.org

Beloit is a city in and the county seat of Mitchell County, Kansas, United States. As of the 2020 census, the population of the city was 3,404.

== History ==
On permanent organization of the county in 1870, Beloit was selected as the county seat of Mitchell County, Kansas, and is located northeast of the center of the county on the Solomon River. In 1873, an iron bridge was built across the river, costing $10,000, equivalent to $254,333 in 2023. The town site of Beloit was first settled by A.A. Bell in 1868 with the idea of improving the water power and for some time was known as Willow Springs. The town was renamed to Beloit by Tim Hersey, one of the original founders and the first mayor, and is named after his hometown, Beloit, Wisconsin. A.A. Bell was appointed postmaster in 1870, and the first school was built in 1871. By 1898, the population was around 2500. Beloit sits at the junction of the Union Pacific and the Missouri Pacific Railroads. Local legend has it that the local Indians advised Bell to locate the town at a certain bend of the Solomon river to protect the town from tornadoes. As of 2022, downtown Beloit has been hit with a tornado only once, in November 1922.

The town of Beloit was platted March 26, 1872, and the original description as found in the recorder's office covers all of Section 9, and the south half of the southeast quarter and south half of the southwest quarter of Section 4, Town 7 and Range 7 west. The proprietors of the town were T.F. Hersey, A.A. Bell, George Campbell, Alexander Campbell, C.H. Morrill, Edward Valentine, W.C. Ingram, Daniel Kepler and Vinton Whitehurst. The town grew very rapidly, and in July 1872, was incorporated as a city of the third class. On March 10, 1879, Gov. John P. St. John proclaimed Beloit a city of the second class.

Beloit was home to the Beloit Juvenile Correctional Facility of the Kansas Juvenile Justice Authority.

== Geography ==
According to the United States Census Bureau, the city has a total area of 4.05 square miles (10.49 km^{2}), of which, 4.02 square miles (10.41 km^{2}) is land and 0.03 square miles (0.08 km^{2}) is water.

=== Climate ===
The climate in this area is characterized by hot, humid summers and generally mild to cool winters. According to the Köppen Climate Classification system, Beloit has a humid subtropical climate, abbreviated "Cfa" on climate maps.

Climate data for Beloit, Kansas (1991–2020 normals, extremes 1893–present)
Month	Jan	Feb	Mar	Apr	May	Jun	Jul	Aug	Sep	Oct	Nov	Dec	Year
Record high °F (°C)	77 (25)	86 (30)	93 (34)	100 (38)	103 (39)	112 (44)	113 (45)	113 (45)	109 (43)	99 (37)	87 (31)	83 (28)	113 (45)
Mean maximum °F (°C)	63.1 (17.3)	69.4 (20.8)	79.8 (26.6)	86.6 (30.3)	92.8 (33.8)	99.2 (37.3)	103.1 (39.5)	101.2 (38.4)	97.4 (36.3)	88.9 (31.6)	75.2 (24.0)	63.7 (17.6)	104.2 (40.1)
Mean daily maximum °F (°C)	39.5 (4.2)	44.1 (6.7)	55.7 (13.2)	65.7 (18.7)	75.4 (24.1)	86.9 (30.5)	91.8 (33.2)	89.1 (31.7)	81.6 (27.6)	68.6 (20.3)	54.2 (12.3)	42.1 (5.6)	66.2 (19.0)
Daily mean °F (°C)	28.2 (−2.1)	32.4 (0.2)	42.8 (6.0)	53.2 (11.8)	63.9 (17.7)	75.2 (24.0)	80.1 (26.7)	77.6 (25.3)	69.3 (20.7)	55.7 (13.2)	42.1 (5.6)	31.1 (−0.5)	54.3 (12.4)
Mean daily minimum °F (°C)	16.9 (−8.4)	20.7 (−6.3)	29.9 (−1.2)	40.7 (4.8)	52.4 (11.3)	63.4 (17.4)	68.4 (20.2)	66.1 (18.9)	57.0 (13.9)	42.7 (5.9)	30.0 (−1.1)	20.1 (−6.6)	42.4 (5.8)
Mean minimum °F (°C)	−0.9 (−18.3)	3.4 (−15.9)	11.9 (−11.2)	25.1 (−3.8)	36.5 (2.5)	50.4 (10.2)	57.4 (14.1)	55.1 (12.8)	41.0 (5.0)	25.9 (−3.4)	14.1 (−9.9)	3.8 (−15.7)	−5.1 (−20.6)
Record low °F (°C)	−27 (−33)	−21 (−29)	−12 (−24)	7 (−14)	27 (−3)	40 (4)	46 (8)	40 (4)	24 (−4)	12 (−11)	−8 (−22)	−26 (−32)	−27 (−33)
Average precipitation inches (mm)	0.68 (17)	0.82 (21)	1.45 (37)	2.60 (66)	4.39 (112)	3.77 (96)	4.84 (123)	3.58 (91)	2.72 (69)	1.98 (50)	1.21 (31)	1.04 (26)	29.08 (739)
Average snowfall inches (cm)	4.0 (10)	3.7 (9.4)	1.7 (4.3)	0.7 (1.8)	0.0 (0.0)	0.0 (0.0)	0.0 (0.0)	0.0 (0.0)	0.0 (0.0)	0.3 (0.76)	1.3 (3.3)	3.9 (9.9)	15.6 (40)
Average precipitation days (≥ 0.01 in)	3.5	4.0	6.0	7.5	10.9	9.3	9.8	8.1	6.6	6.4	4.4	4.0	80.5
Average snowy days (≥ 0.1 in)	2.2	2.0	1.0	0.2	0.0	0.0	0.0	0.0	0.0	0.1	0.6	1.9	8.0
Source: NOAA

== Demographics ==
Historical population
Census	Pop.	Note	%±
1880	1,835		—
1890	2,455		33.8%
1900	2,359		−3.9%
1910	3,082		30.6%
1920	3,315		7.6%
1930	3,502		5.6%
1940	3,765		7.5%
1950	4,085		8.5%
1960	3,837		−6.1%
1970	4,121		7.4%
1980	4,367		6.0%
1990	4,066		−6.9%
2000	4,019		−1.2%
2010	3,835		−4.6%
2020	3,404		−11.2%
U.S. Decennial Census

=== 2020 census ===
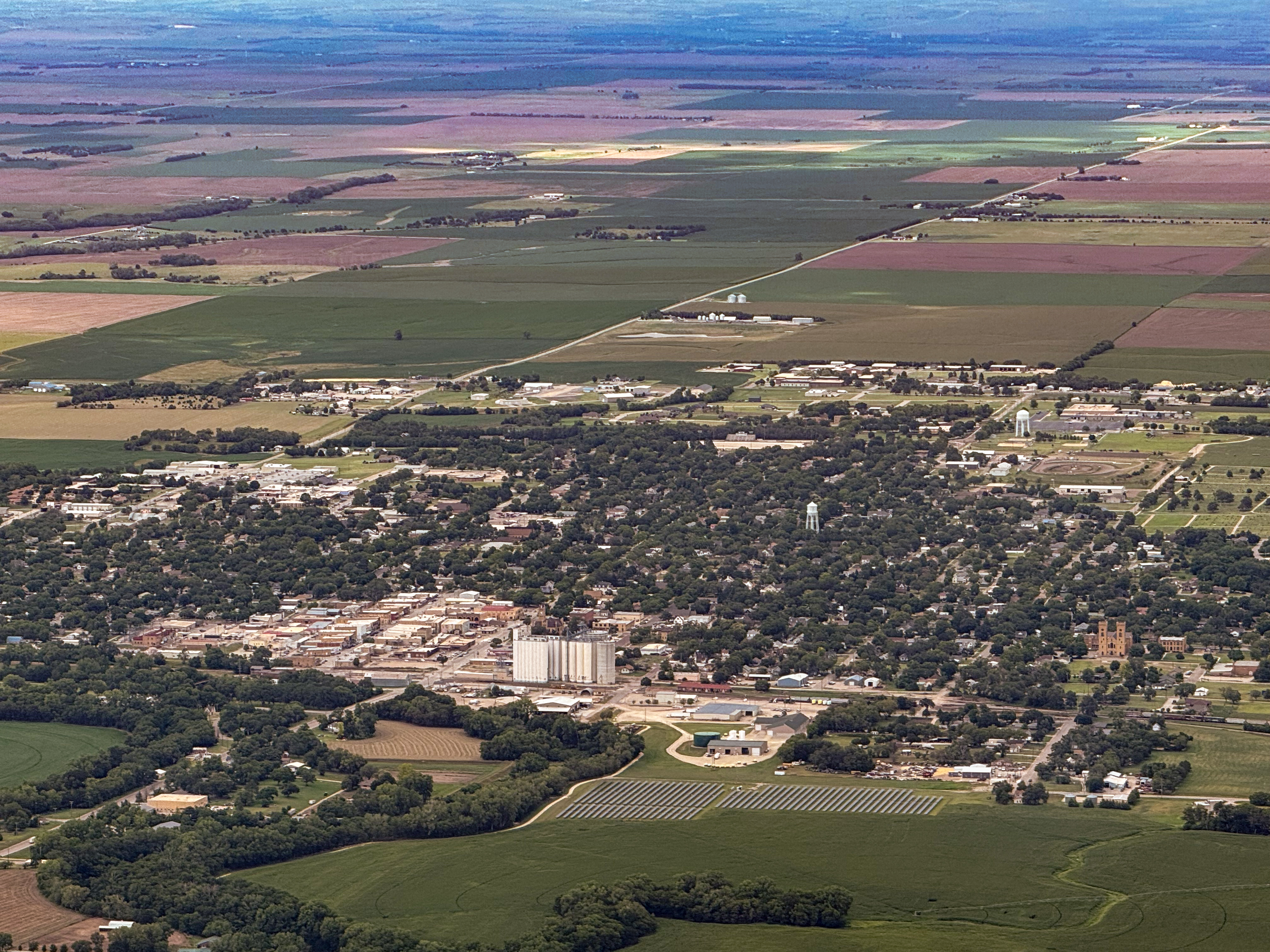
Oblique aerial view of Beloit

As of the 2020 census, Beloit had a population of 3,404, including 1,471 households and 855 families. The population density was 869.0 per square mile (335.5/km^{2}). There were 1,788 housing units at an average density of 456.5 per square mile (176.2/km^{2}).

The median age was 44.6 years. 23.4% of residents were under the age of 18, 6.1% were from 18 to 24, 21.1% were from 25 to 44, 24.9% were from 45 to 64, and 24.5% were 65 years of age or older. For every 100 females there were 91.9 males, and for every 100 females age 18 and over there were 88.9 males age 18 and over.

There were 1,471 households in Beloit, of which 24.0% had children under the age of 18 living in them. Of all households, 48.1% were married-couple households, 20.1% were households with a male householder and no spouse or partner present, and 27.7% were households with a female householder and no spouse or partner present. About 38.1% of all households were made up of individuals, and 16.9% had someone living alone who was 65 years of age or older.

There were 1,788 housing units, of which 17.7% were vacant. The homeowner vacancy rate was 4.0% and the rental vacancy rate was 16.3%. 0.0% of residents lived in urban areas, while 100.0% lived in rural areas.

Racial composition as of the 2020 census
Race	Number	Percent
White	3,215	94.4%
Black or African American	15	0.4%
American Indian and Alaska Native	10	0.3%
Asian	8	0.2%
Native Hawaiian and Other Pacific Islander	0	0.0%
Some other race	29	0.9%
Two or more races	127	3.7%
Hispanic or Latino (of any race)	111	3.3%

Non-Hispanic White residents accounted for 93.21% of the population.

Demographic estimates

The average household size was 2.2 and the average family size was 2.7. The percent of those with a bachelor's degree or higher was estimated to be 19.8% of the population.

Income and poverty

The 2016–2020 5-year American Community Survey estimates show that the median household income was $46,196 (with a margin of error of +/- $5,878) and the median family income was $51,765 (+/- $3,192). Males had a median income of $35,960 (+/- $4,983) versus $24,554 (+/- $6,200) for females. The median income for those above 16 years old was $30,283 (+/- $5,552). Approximately, 5.4% of families and 17.2% of the population were below the poverty line, including 13.6% of those under the age of 18 and 12.8% of those ages 65 or over.

=== 2010 census ===
As of the census of 2010, there were 3,835 people, 1,647 households, and 964 families residing in the city. The population density was 954.0 inhabitants per square mile (368.3/km^{2}). There were 1,842 housing units at an average density of 458.2 per square mile (176.9/km^{2}). The racial makeup of the city was 98.1% White, 0.3% African American, 0.4% Native American, 0.2% Asian, 0.1% Pacific Islander, 0.2% from other races, and 0.8% from two or more races. Hispanic or Latino of any race were 1.0% of the population.

There were 1,647 households, of which 25.6% had children under the age of 18 living with them, 48.3% were married couples living together, 7.7% had a female householder with no husband present, 2.6% had a male householder with no wife present, and 41.5% were non-families. 35.3% of all households were made up of individuals, and 15% had someone living alone who was 65 years of age or older. The average household size was 2.18 and the average family size was 2.83.

The median age in the city was 42.8 years. 21.6% of residents were under the age of 18; 10% were between the ages of 18 and 24; 20.6% were from 25 to 44; 26.8% were from 45 to 64; and 21% were 65 years of age or older. The gender makeup of the city was 49.9% male and 50.1% female.

== Government ==
=== Local ===
Beloit has a Mayor/City Council form of government. Voters elect five city council members and elect a Mayor. The Mayor and the 5 City Councilors form the City of Beloit Governing Body.

The Beloit Governing Body meets in business session at 7:00 p.m. on the first and third Tuesdays of each month. Meetings take place in the Council Chambers at the Municipal Building. Cable channel 12 televises regular meetings.

=== Districts ===
Beloit lies within Kansas's 1st congressional district, currently represented by Tracey Mann. For the purpose of representation in the Kansas Legislature, the city is located in the 36th Senate District, currently represented by Elaine Bowers, and the 107th House District, currently represented by Susan Concannon. On the local level, Beloit is in both the first, represented by Tom Claussen, and second, represented by Mike Cooper, Mitchell County Commissioner Districts. Beloit is mostly in Beloit Township, but the very far north side of the city is located in Plum Creek Township.

== Education ==
The community is served by Beloit USD 273 public school district, where two of its three schools are located: Beloit Elementary School and Beloit Junior/Senior High School. Beloit Junior/Senior High School contains an average of 230 students per school year. This high school participates in the 3A division for extracurricular activities. The mascot for Beloit Junior/Senior High is the "Trojans."

Beloit also is home to St. John's Catholic Grade School and St. John's Catholic High School (Beloit, Kansas). St. John's Catholic High School contains an average of 60 students total each school year. This high school participates in the 1A, Division II category for extracurricular activities. The mascot for St. John's is the "Bluejay."

Beloit is home to the North Central Kansas Technical College and was home, until 2009, to the Kansas Industrial School for Girls.

== Notable people ==
- Sam Colson, former javelin thrower.
- Scott Fulhage, professional football punter with the Atlanta Falcons and Cincinnati Bengals.
- Margaret H'Doubler, educator.
- Gene Keady, college and professional basketball coach.
- Waldo McBurney, former oldest living worker in the United States.
- Nancy Moritz, United States circuit judge for the United States Court of Appeals for the Tenth Circuit and former justice on the Kansas Supreme Court. She was born in Beloit and lived in nearby Tipton, Kansas, until the age of 15.
- Mathew Pitsch, Republican member of the Arkansas House of Representatives from Fort Smith since 2015; former resident of Beloit.
- Dean Sturgis, baseball player.
- Rodger Ward, professional race car driver. Two-time Indianapolis 500 winner.

== See also ==
- St. John's Catholic High School
