= Dan McCarthy =

Dan, Daniel, or Danny McCarthy may refer to:

- Dan McCarthy (hurler) (1918–unknown), Irish hurler
- Dan McCarthy (ice hockey) (born 1958), Canadian ice hockey player
- Dan McCarthy (JAG), captain in the United States Navy
- Dan McCarthy (vibraphonist), Canadian jazz vibraphone player
- Daniel McCarthy (politician) (1883–1957), Irish politician
- Daniel McCarthy (producer) (c. 1926–2013), Canadian television producer
- Daniel M. McCarthy (1888–1950), American Democratic politician and lawyer
- Daniel W. McCarthy (born 1955), American composer
- Danny McCarthy, American actor
- Danny McCarthy (footballer) (1942–2019), Welsh football winger

== See also ==
- Daniel MacCarthy Glas (1807–1884), English historian and biographer
