= Kansas's 6th congressional district =

Former U.S. House district from 1883 to 1963

- Obsolete district
- Created: 1885
- Eliminated: 1960
- Years active: 1885-1963

Kansas's 6th congressional district is an obsolete district for representation in the United States House of Representatives.

It existed from 1885 to 1963. Before it was eliminated Bob Dole was the final person to represent the district. In its final configuration, it was located in north central and northwest Kansas, anchored by Hays, with Goodland at the western edge of the district and Salina and Concordia at the eastern edge.

== List of members representing the district ==
Member	Party	Years	Cong ress	Electoral history
District created March 4, 1885
Lewis Hanback (Osborne)	Republican	March 4, 1885 – March 3, 1887	49th	Redistricted from the at-large district and re-elected in 1884. Lost renomination.
Erastus J. Turner (Hoxie)	Republican	March 4, 1887 – March 3, 1891	50th 51st	Elected in 1886. Re-elected in 1888. Retired.
William Baker (Lincoln)	Populist	March 4, 1891 – March 3, 1897	52nd 53rd 54th	Elected in 1890. Re-elected in 1892. Re-elected in 1894. Retired.
Nelson B. McCormick (Phillipsburg)	Populist	March 4, 1897 – March 3, 1899	55th	Elected in 1896. Lost re-election.
William A. Reeder (Logan)	Republican	March 4, 1899 – March 3, 1911	56th 57th 58th 59th 60th 61st	Elected in 1898. Re-elected in 1900. Re-elected in 1902. Re-elected in 1904. Re-elected in 1906. Re-elected in 1908. Lost renomination.
Isaac D. Young (Beloit)	Republican	March 4, 1911 – March 3, 1913	62nd	Elected in 1910. Lost re-election.
John R. Connelly (Colby)	Democratic	March 4, 1913 – March 3, 1919	63rd 64th 65th	Elected in 1912. Re-elected in 1914. Re-elected in 1916. Lost re-election.
Hays B. White (Mankato)	Republican	March 4, 1919 – March 3, 1929	66th 67th 68th 69th 70th	Elected in 1918. Re-elected in 1920. Re-elected in 1922. Re-elected in 1924. Re-elected in 1926. Retired.
Charles I. Sparks (Goodland)	Republican	March 4, 1929 – March 3, 1933	71st 72nd	Elected in 1928. Re-elected in 1930. Lost re-election.
Kathryn O'Loughlin McCarthy (Hays)	Democratic	March 4, 1933 – January 3, 1935	73rd	Elected in 1932. Lost re-election.
Frank Carlson (Concordia)	Republican	January 3, 1935 – January 3, 1947	74th 75th 76th 77th 78th 79th	Elected in 1934. Re-elected in 1936. Re-elected in 1938. Re-elected in 1940. Re-elected in 1942. Re-elected in 1944. Retired to run for Governor of Kansas.
Wint Smith (Mankato)	Republican	January 3, 1947 – January 3, 1961	80th 81st 82nd 83rd 84th 85th 86th	Elected in 1946. Re-elected in 1948. Re-elected in 1950. Re-elected in 1952. Re-elected in 1954. Re-elected in 1956. Re-elected in 1958. Retired.
Bob Dole (Russell)	Republican	January 3, 1961 – January 3, 1963	87th	Elected in 1960. Redistricted to the 1st district.
District eliminated January 3, 1963
