= 1968 United States Senate election in Kansas =

- November 5, 1968
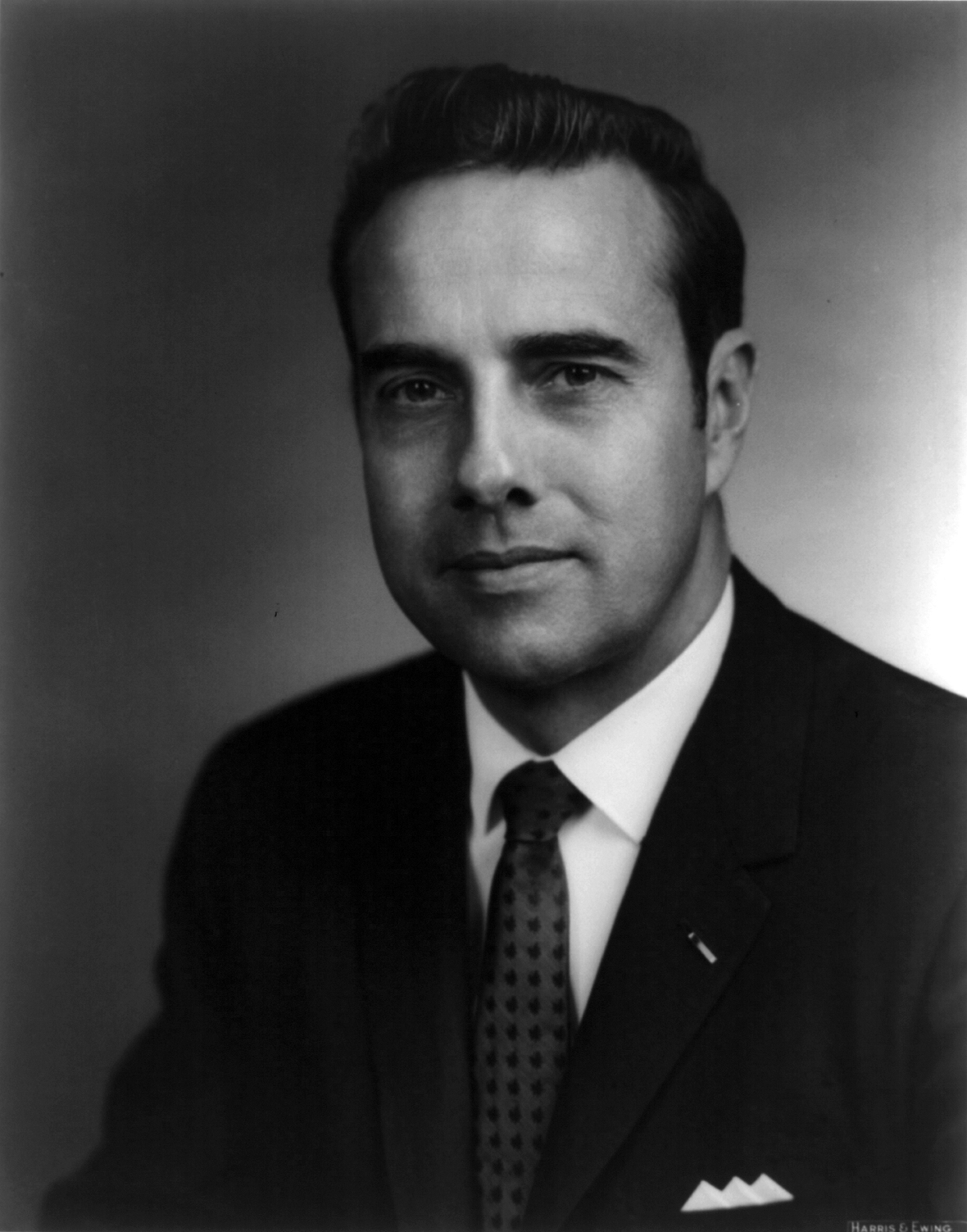

| Nominee | Bob Dole | William I. Robinson |
| Party | Republican | Democratic |
| Popular vote | 490,911 | 315,911 |
| Percentage | 60.08% | 38.66% |
- County results Dole: 50–60% 60–70% 70–80% Robinson: 50–60%
U.S. senator before election
Frank Carlson
Republican
Elected U.S. senator
Bob Dole
Republican

The 1968 United States Senate election in Kansas took place on November 5, 1968, concurrently with the U.S. presidential election as well as other elections to the United States Senate in other states as well as elections to the United States House of Representatives and various state and local elections. Incumbent Republican U.S. Senator Frank Carlson did not run for re-election. Republican nominee Bob Dole won his first term in office, defeating Democratic nominee William I. Robinson with 60.08% of the vote.

== Primary elections ==
Primary elections were held on August 6, 1968.

=== Democratic primary ===
==== Candidates ====
- Irene Corn
- James Kenneth Logan, dean of the University of Kansas School of Law
- George A. Lopez, employee of a meat packing plant
- William I. Robinson, attorney, Democratic nominee for Kansas's 4th congressional district in 1960
- K. L. "Ken" Smith, Democratic nominee for U.S. Senate in 1962

==== Results ====
Democratic primary results
| Party | Candidate | Votes | % |
|---|---|---|---|
| Democratic | William I. Robinson | 56,242 | 40.90 |
| Democratic | James Kenneth Logan | 50,709 | 36.88 |
| Democratic | K. L. "Ken" Smith | 13,698 | 9.96 |
| Democratic | George A. Lopez | 9,386 | 6.83 |
| Democratic | Irene Corn | 7,474 | 5.44 |
| Total votes | | 137,509 | 100.00% |

=== Republican primary ===
==== Candidates ====
- William H. Avery, former Governor of Kansas
- Bob Dole, incumbent U.S. Representative for Kansas's 1st congressional district

==== Results ====
Republican primary results
| Party | Candidate | Votes | % |
|---|---|---|---|
| Republican | Bob Dole | 190,782 | 68.48 |
| Republican | William H. Avery | 87,801 | 31.52 |
| Total votes | | 278,583 | 100.00 |

== General election ==
=== Candidates ===
- Bob Dole (R)
- William I. Robinson (D)
- Joseph Fred Hyskell (P)

=== Results ===
1968 United States Senate election in Kansas
| Party | Candidate | Votes | % |
|---|---|---|---|
| Republican | Bob Dole | 490,911 | 60.08 |
| Democratic | William I. Robinson | 315,911 | 38.66 |
| Prohibition | Joseph Fred Hyskell | 10,262 | 1.26 |
| None | Scattering | 12 | 0.00 |
| Majority | | 175,000 | 21.42 |
| Turnout | | 817,096 | |
| Republican hold | | | |

== See also ==
- 1968 United States Senate elections

== Bibliography ==
- Congressional Elections, 1946-1996. Washington, D.C.: Congressional Quarterly Inc. 1998. ISBN 1-56802-248-4.
- Scammon, Richard M., ed. (1970). America Votes 8: a handbook of contemporary American election statistics, 1968. Washington, D.C.: Governmental Affairs Institute.
