= Lewis Hanback =

American politician

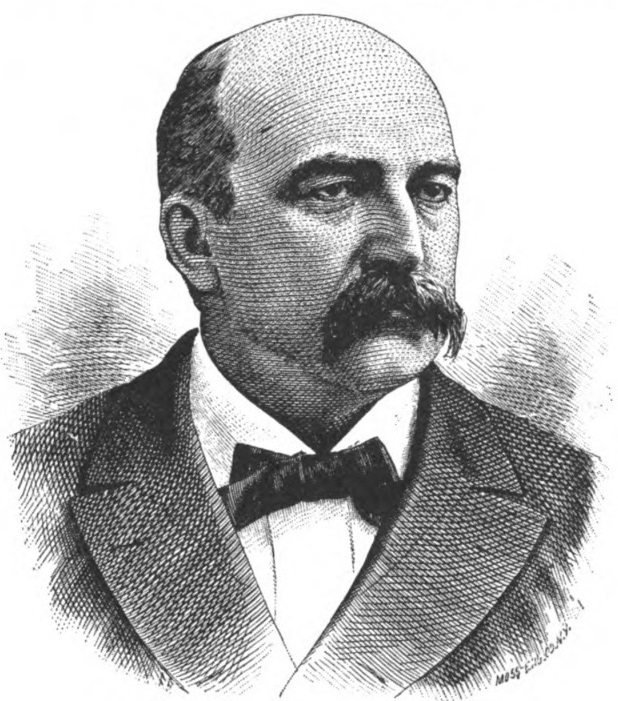
- From 1883's History of the State of Kansas

Member of the U.S. House of Representatives from Kansas
- In office March 4, 1883 – March 3, 1887
- Preceded by: David P. Lowe (AL); District established (6th)
- Succeeded by: William A. Harris (AL); Erastus J. Turner (6th)
- Constituency: At-large district (1883-85); 6th district (1885-87)

Personal details
- Born: March 27, 1839 Winchester, Illinois
- Died: September 7, 1897 (aged 58) Kansas City, Kansas
- Resting place: Topeka Cemetery, Topeka, Kansas
- Party: Republican

Military service
- Rank: Brigade Inspector
- Engagement: Civil War

Lewis Hanback (March 27, 1839 – September 7, 1897) was a U.S. representative from Kansas.

Born in Winchester, Illinois, Hanback attended the common schools and Cherry Grove Seminary in Knox County, Illinois for three years. He taught a school in Morgan County, Illinois, in 1860 and 1861. During the Civil War he enlisted as a private in the Illinois Volunteer Infantry and was later promoted to brigade inspector. He studied law in Albany, New York and he returned to Illinois and from there moved to Topeka, Kansas where he was admitted to the bar in 1865 and began practicing law.

Hanback was elected as Justice of the Peace in 1867. He was Probate judge of Shawnee County from 1868 to 1872. He served as assistant chief clerk of the State house of representatives, assistant secretary of the State senate in 1877, and assistant United States district attorney of Kansas 1877–1879. He then served as Receiver of public moneys at Salina, Kansas.

Hanback was elected as a Republican to the Forty-eighth and Forty-ninth Congresses (March 4, 1883 – March 3, 1887). He was an unsuccessful candidate for re-election to the Fiftieth Congress, he resumed the practice of law after that. He died in Kansas City, Kansas, September 7, 1897, He was interred in Topeka Cemetery, Topeka, Kansas.

U.S. House of Representatives
Preceded by David P. Lowe	Member of the U.S. House of Representatives from Kansas's at-large congressional district 1883 – 1885	Succeeded by William A. Harris
New district	Member of the U.S. House of Representatives from Kansas's 6th congressional district 1885 – 1887	Succeeded by Erastus J. Turner
