= Senator McCarthy =

Senator McCarthy can refer to:

== Members of the United States Senate ==
- Joseph McCarthy (1908–1957), U.S. Senator from Wisconsin from 1947 to 1957
- Eugene McCarthy (1916–2005), U.S. Senator from Minnesota from 1959 to 1971

== United States state senate members ==
- Charles F. McCarthy (1876–1938), Massachusetts State Senate
- Daniel M. McCarthy (1888–1950), Kansas State Senate
- Dennis McCarthy (politician) (1814–1886), New York State Senate
- John F. McCarthy (1924–1981), California State Senate
- Robert E. McCarthy (born 1949), Massachusetts State Senate
- Robert I. McCarthy (1920–2007), California State Senate
- Robert W. McCarthy (1924–2015), Illinois State Senate

== See also ==
- Senator McCarty (disambiguation)
