= Nikola Resanovic =

American composer (born 1955)

Nikola Resanovic (born 1955) is an American composer and professor of music at the University of Akron School of Music. He is the winner of the 2003 Cleveland Arts Prize in Music and is one of Ohio's best known living composers.

In 1955, he was born in Derby, England. Resanovic moved to the United States where he has been a naturalized citizen since 1976. He holds degrees from the University of Akron and the Cleveland Institute of Music. He is currently a professor of music at the University of Akron.

Resanovic has composed numerous symphonic and choral works, symphonic band works, chamber and solo works, as well as some rather avant-garde electro-acoustic compositions. His works have been performed globally. His choral works are heavily influenced by Serbian music; Resanovic, of Serbian descent himself, has extensively studied the sacred chants of the Serbian Orthodox Church and has composed several volumes of liturgical music.

== Selected works ==
- alt.music.ballistix for clarinet and digital audio tape
- Crosstalk for E-flat alto saxophone and digital audio tape
- South Side Fantasy for solo double bass and Compact Disc
- Dance In A White Bay for orchestra, commemorating the crew of the Edmund Fitzgerald
- Drones and Nanorhytms for woodwind quintet
- Sonata for Euphonium and Piano for euphonium and piano
