= 1950 United States Senate elections in Kansas =

1950 United States Senate special election in Kansas
- November 7, 1950
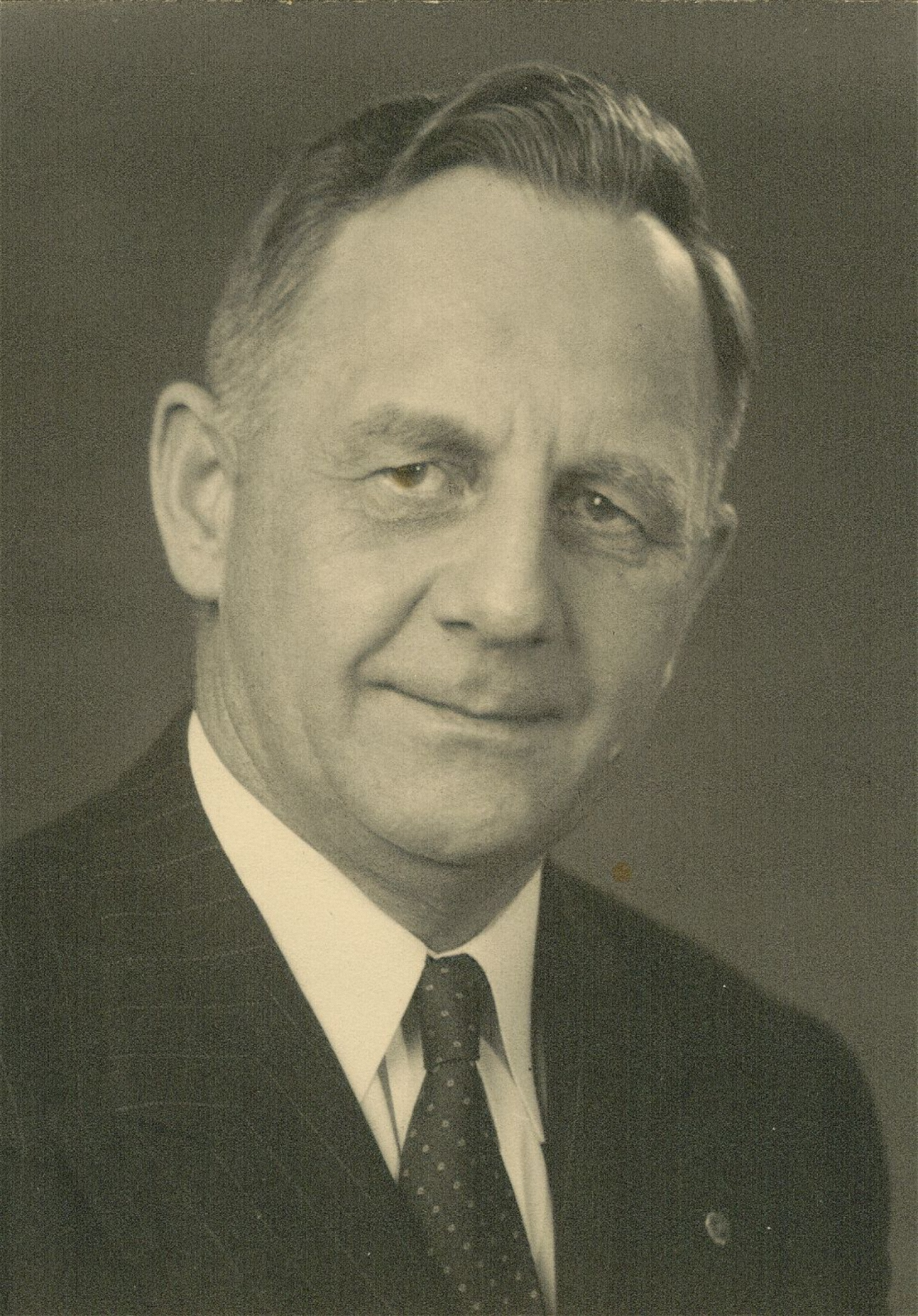

Nominee	Frank Carlson	Paul Aiken
Party	Republican	Democratic
Popular vote	335,880	271,365
Percentage	54.25%	43.83%
- County results Carlson: 40–50% 50–60% 60–70% Aiken: 40–50% 50–60%
Senator before election
Harry Darby
Republican
Elected Senator
Frank Carlson
Republican

The 1950 United States Senate elections in Kansas took place on November 7, 1950. Incumbent Republican Senator Clyde M. Reed died in office on November 8, 1949. Governor Frank Carlson appointed Harry Darby to serve out the remaining year of Reed's term. Two elections for the same Senate seat were held on the same day: one as a special election to fill the remainder of Reed's six-year term, and another to elect a Senator to serve the next six-year term. Darby did not seek re-election. Instead, Governor Carlson ran, won the Republican primary, and defeated Democratic nominee Paul Aiken, the former Assistant U.S. Postmaster General, by a wide margin.

== Democratic primary ==
=== Regular election ===
==== Candidates ====
- Paul Aiken, Assistant U.S. Postmaster General
- Carl V. Rice, Kansas City attorney and state Democratic National Committeeman

==== Results ====
Democratic primary results
Party	Candidate	Votes	%
Democratic	Paul Aiken	54,857	57.15%
Democratic	Carl V. Rice	41,135	42.85%
Total votes		95,992	100.00%

=== Special election ===
==== Candidates ====
- Paul Aiken, Assistant U.S. Postmaster General
- Carl V. Rice, Kansas City attorney and state Democratic National Committeeman

==== Results ====
Democratic primary results
Party	Candidate	Votes	%
Democratic	Paul Aiken	47,975	57.75%
Democratic	Carl V. Rice	35,103	42.25%
Total votes		83,078	100.00%

== Republican primary ==
=== Regular election ===
==== Candidates ====
- Frank Carlson, Governor of Kansas
- Harry W. Colmery, former National Commander of American Legion

==== Results ====
Republican primary results
Party	Candidate	Votes	%
Republican	Frank Carlson	140,798	58.61%
Republican	Harry W. Colmery	99,418	41.39%
Total votes		240,216	100.00%

=== Special election ===
==== Candidates ====
- Frank Carlson, Governor of Kansas
- Harry W. Colmery, former National Commander of American Legion

==== Results ====
Republican primary results
Party	Candidate	Votes	%
Republican	Frank Carlson	121,020	57.37%
Republican	Harry W. Colmery	89,921	42.63%
Total votes		210,941	100.00%

== Prohibition primary ==
=== Regular election ===
==== Candidates ====
- Floyd M. Gurley

==== Results ====
Prohibition primary results
Party	Candidate	Votes	%
Prohibition	Floyd M. Gurley	379	100.00%
Total votes		379	100.00%

After winning the primary election, Gurley withdrew from the race, explaining, "My reason being that I have conscientious objections to the advocacy or support of a state legalizing or supporting the sale of whiskey or other forms of debauchery." Gurley was replaced on the general election ballot by Verne L. Damon, a history professor at Sterling College.

== General election ==
=== Regular election ===
1950 United States Senate election in Kansas
Party	Candidate	Votes	%	±%
Republican	Frank Carlson	335,880	54.25%	−3.59%
Democratic	Paul Aiken	271,365	43.83%	+3.18%
Prohibition	Verne L. Damon	11,859	1.92%	—
Majority		64,515	10.42%	−6.77%
Total votes		619,104	100.00%	
Republican hold				

=== Special election ===
1950 United States Senate special election in Kansas
Party	Candidate	Votes	%	±%
Republican	Frank Carlson	321,718	55.17%	−2.67%
Democratic	Paul Aiken	261,405	44.83%	+4.17%
Majority		60,313	10.34%	−6.85%
Total votes		583,123	100.00%	
Republican hold				

== See also ==
- 1950 United States Senate elections
