= William Baker (Kansas politician) =

American politician (1831–1910)

William Hewitt Baker
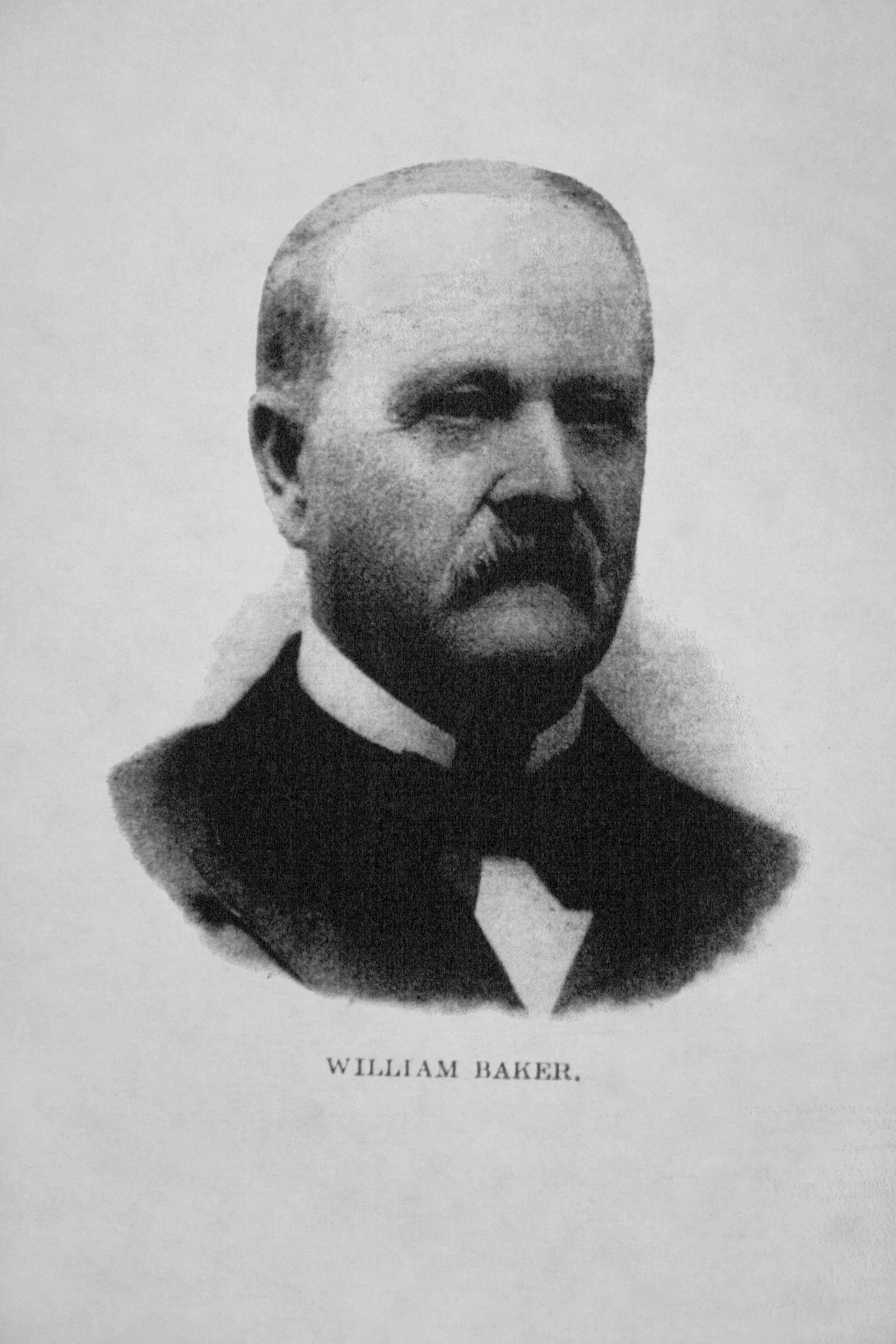

Member of the U.S. House of Representatives from Kansas's 6th district
- In office March 4, 1891 – March 3, 1897
- Preceded by: Erastus J. Turner
- Succeeded by: Nelson B. McCormick

Personal details
- Born: April 29, 1831 Washington County, Pennsylvania
- Died: February 11, 1910 (aged 78) Lincoln Center, Kansas
- Resting place: Lincoln Center Cemetery
- Party: Populist

William Hewitt Baker (April 29, 1831 – February 11, 1910) was a U.S. representative from Kansas.

== Personal life ==
William Hewitt Baker was born near Centerville, Pennsylvania, and grew up to become a prominent figure in Kansas. He attended public school and graduated from Waynesboro in 1856. He married Philena Griffith in 1858, and they had eight children together. In 1878, Baker moved to Lincoln County, Kansas, where he became a farmer and rancher. He later entered politics and served in the U.S. House of Representatives from 1891 to 1897. Baker died on February 11, 1910, at 4:15 p.m., February 11, 1910 and was interred in Lincoln Center Cemetery. His obituary was published in the Lincoln Sentinel, February 10, 1910.

== Career ==
Baker was a teacher and moved to Iowa in 1859 to become the principal of the public schools in Council Bluffs. Baker studied law, was admitted to the bar in 1860, but never practised. In 1865, he returned to Beallsville, Pennsylvania. From 1865 to 1878, he engaged in mercantile pursuits.

William Hewitt Baker, a member of the Populist Party, was elected to three consecutive terms in the U.S. House of Representatives, serving from March 4, 1891, to March 3, 1897, as part of the Fifty-second, Fifty-third, and Fifty-fourth Congresses. He was not a candidate for re-nomination in 1896, and he resumed agricultural pursuits.

U.S. House of Representatives
Preceded by Erastus J. Turner	Member of the U.S. House of Representatives from Kansas's 6th congressional district 1891-1897	Succeeded by Nelson B. McCormick
