= Kansas's at-large congressional district =

Former congressional district

- Obsolete district
- Created: 1861; 1883; 1893
- Eliminated: 1875; 1885; 1907

Kansas's at-large congressional district for the United States House of Representatives in the state of Kansas is a defunct congressional district. It existed from statehood January 29, 1861 to March 4, 1907.

== List of members representing the district ==
Years	Cong ress	Seat A			Seat B			Seat C			Seat D		
Years	Cong ress	Representative	Party	Electoral history	Representative	Party	Electoral history	Representative	Party	Electoral history	Representative	Party	Electoral history
January 29, 1861 – March 3, 1863	36th 37th	Martin F. Conway (Lawrence)	Republican	Elected December 1, 1859, in advance of statehood. Continued in office without re-election in 1861. Retired.									
March 4, 1863 – March 3, 1865	38th	A. Carter Wilder (Lawrence)	Republican	Elected in 1862. Retired.									
March 4, 1865 – March 3, 1871	39th 40th 41st	Sidney Clarke (Lawrence)	Republican	Elected in 1864. Re-elected in 1866. Re-elected in 1868. Lost re-election.									
March 4, 1871 – March 3, 1873	42nd	David P. Lowe (Fort Scott)	Republican	Elected in 1870. Re-elected in 1872. Retired.									
March 4, 1873 – March 3, 1875	43rd	David P. Lowe (Fort Scott)	Republican	Elected in 1870. Re-elected in 1872. Retired.	Stephen A. Cobb (Wyandotte)	Republican	Elected in 1872. Redistricted to the 1st district and lost re-election.	William A. Phillips (Salina)	Republican	Elected in 1872. Redistricted to the 1st district.			
March 4, 1875 - March 3, 1883	44th 45th 46th 47th	Seat eliminated			Seat eliminated			Seat eliminated					
March 4, 1883 – March 3, 1885	48th	Lewis Hanback (Osborne)	Republican	Elected in 1882. Redistricted to the 6th district.	Edmund N. Morrill (Hiawatha)	Republican	Elected in 1882. Re-elected in the 1st district.	Bishop W. Perkins (Oswego)	Republican	Elected in 1882. Re-elected in the 3rd district.	Samuel R. Peters (Newton)	Republican	Elected in 1882. Redistricted to the 7th district.
March 4, 1885 - March 3, 1893	49th 50th 51st 52nd	Seat eliminated			Seat eliminated			Seat eliminated			Seat eliminated		
March 4, 1893 – March 3, 1895	53rd	William A. Harris (Linwood)	Populist	Elected in 1892. Lost re-election.	Seat eliminated			Seat eliminated			Seat eliminated		
March 4, 1895 – March 3, 1897	54th	Richard W. Blue (Pleasanton)	Republican	Elected in 1894. Lost re-election.	Seat eliminated			Seat eliminated			Seat eliminated		
March 4, 1897 – March 3, 1899	55th	Jeremiah D. Botkin (Winfield)	Populist	Elected in 1896. Lost re-election.	Seat eliminated			Seat eliminated			Seat eliminated		
March 4, 1899 – March 3, 1901	56th	Willis J. Bailey (Baileyville)	Republican	Elected in 1898. Retired.	Seat eliminated			Seat eliminated			Seat eliminated		
March 4, 1901 – March 3, 1907	57th 58th 59th	Charles F. Scott (Iola)	Republican	Elected in 1900. Re-elected in 1902. Re-elected in 1904. Redistricted to the 2nd district.	Seat eliminated			Seat eliminated			Seat eliminated		
March 4, 1901 – March 3, 1907	57th 58th 59th	Seat eliminated			Seat eliminated			Seat eliminated			Seat eliminated		
