= Sidney Clarke =

American politician (1831–1909)

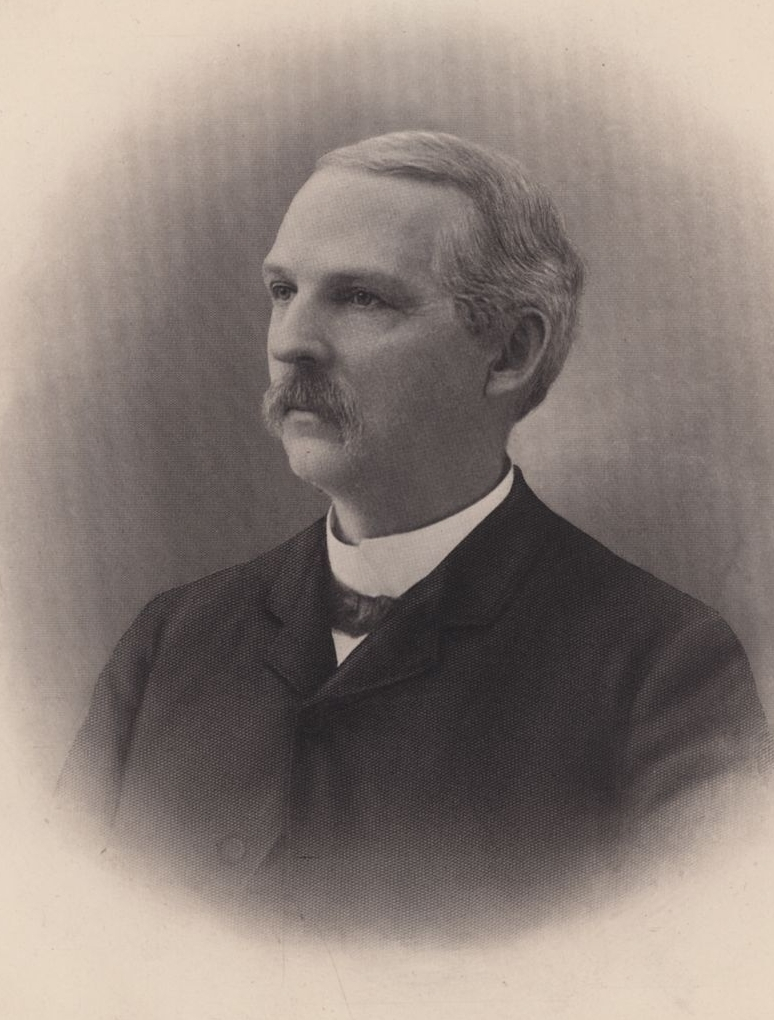

Member of the Oklahoma Territorial Council for the 6th district
- In office 1888–1902
- Preceded by: J. W. Johnson
- Succeeded by: Herbert H. Champlin

2nd Mayor of Oklahoma City
- In office November 11, 1889 – November 12, 1889
- Preceded by: William Couch
- Succeeded by: Andrew Jackson Beale

Member of the U.S. House of Representatives from Kansas's at-large district
- In office March 4, 1865 – March 3, 1871
- Preceded by: A. Carter Wilder
- Succeeded by: David P. Lowe

Personal details
- Born: October 16, 1831 Southbridge, Massachusetts, U.S.
- Died: June 18, 1909 (aged 77) Oklahoma City, Oklahoma, U.S.
- Resting place: Fairlawn Cemetery
- Party: Republican
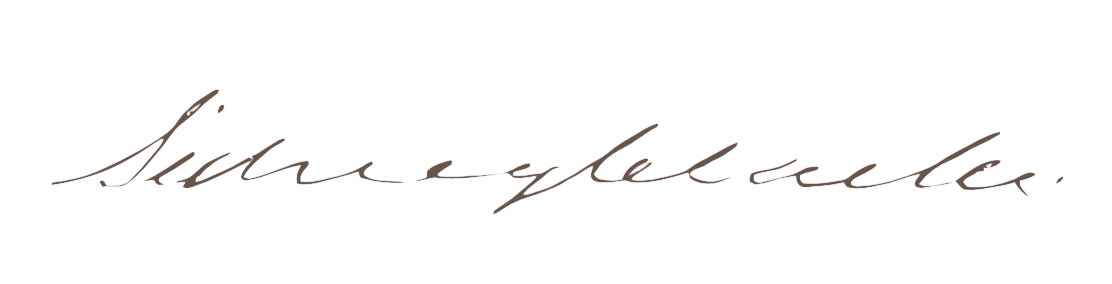
- Signature

Sidney Clarke (October 16, 1831 – June 18, 1909) was a U.S. representative from Kansas, a Kansas state speaker of the house, and an Oklahoma territorial legislator. He was a part of the Oklahoma statehood movement.

== Early life ==
Born in Southbridge, Massachusetts, Clarke attended the public schools. He was publisher of the Southbridge Press in 1854, and settled in Lawrence, Kansas, in 1859. Clarke enlisted as a volunteer during the Civil War, and was appointed assistant adjutant general of Volunteers by President Lincoln February 9, 1863. He served as captain and assistant provost marshal general for Kansas, Nebraska, Colorado, and Dakota.

== Congressional career ==
Clarke was elected as a Republican to the Thirty-ninth, Fortieth, and Forty-first Congresses (March 4, 1865 – March 3, 1871). He served as chairman of the Committee on Indian Affairs (Forty-first Congress). He was an unsuccessful candidate in 1870 for reelection to the Forty-second Congress.

== Later life ==
Clarke served in the Kansas state house of representatives in 1879 as an independent and was elected speaker. He moved to Oklahoma City, Oklahoma, in 1889 and engaged in railroad building. He served as chairman of the statehood executive committee in 1891, and as member of the Territorial council from 1898 to 1902. He also served on the Oklahoma City Council and as the second provisional mayor. He died in Oklahoma City, and was interred in Fairlawn Cemetery.

U.S. House of Representatives
| Preceded by A. Carter Wilder | Member of the U.S. House of Representatives from Kansas's at-large congressional district 1865–1871 | Succeeded by David P. Lowe |
