= Nelson B. McCormick =

American politician

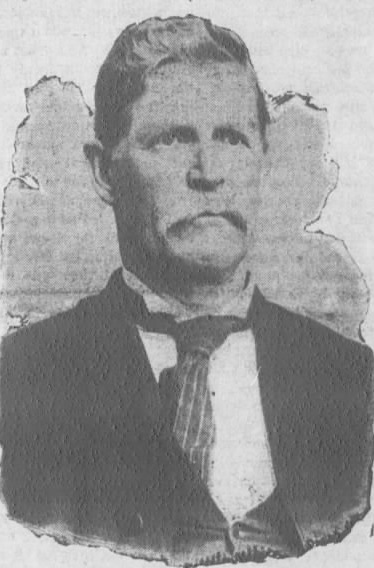
- The Advocate (Topeka, Kansas), July 15, 1896

Member of the U.S. House of Representatives from Kansas's 6th district
- In office March 4, 1897 – March 3, 1899
- Preceded by: William Baker
- Succeeded by: William Augustus Reeder

Personal details
- Born: November 20, 1847 Waynesburg, Pennsylvania
- Died: April 10, 1914 (aged 66) Phillipsburg, Kansas
- Party: Populist

Nelson B. McCormick (November 20, 1847 – April 10, 1914) was a U.S. representative from Kansas.

Born near Waynesburg, Pennsylvania, Mccormick attended the common schools. He moved to Marion County, Iowa, in 1867, where he engaged in farming and stock raising until his removal to Phillips County, Kansas, where he settled upon a homestead in 1877. He studied law. He was admitted to the bar in 1882 and commenced practice in Phillipsburg, Kansas. Deputy prosecuting attorney of Phillips County 1886–1888. He served as prosecuting attorney 1890–1894. He declined to be a candidate for renomination.

McCormick was elected as a Populist to the Fifty-fifth Congress (March 4, 1897 – March 3, 1899). He was an unsuccessful candidate for reelection in 1898 to the Fifty-sixth Congress. He resumed the practice of law in Phillipsburg. He served as delegate to the Democratic State conventions in 1904 and 1908. He served as prosecuting attorney of Phillips County 1910–1914. He died in Phillipsburg, Kansas on April 10, 1914. He was interred in Fairview Cemetery.

U.S. House of Representatives
Preceded by William Baker	Member of the U.S. House of Representatives from Kansas's 6th congressional district 1897-1899	Succeeded by William Augustus Reeder
