= Martin F. Conway =

American politician (1827–1882)

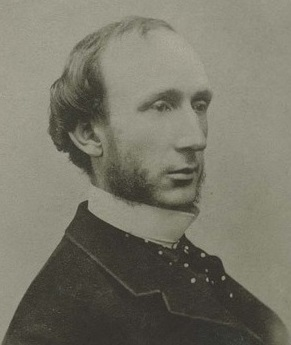
- Photo by J. H. Leonard (Topeka, KS), circa 1882

Member of the U.S. House of Representatives from Kansas's at-large district
- In office January 29, 1861 – March 3, 1863
- Preceded by: District established
- Succeeded by: Abel Carter Wilder

Personal details
- Born: Martin Franklin Conway; November 19, 1827 near Fallston, Harford County, Maryland, U.S.
- Died: February 15, 1882 (aged 54) Washington, D.C., U.S.
- Resting place: Rock Creek Cemetery
- Party: Republican
- Spouse: Emily Frances Dyke (m. 1851)
- Children: 1

Martin Franklin Conway (November 19, 1827 – February 15, 1882) was a U.S. congressman, consul to France, abolitionist, and advocate of the Free-State movement in Kansas.

== Early life ==
Martin Franklin Conway was born on November 19, 1827, at "Bretons Hill" near Fallston, Harford County, Maryland, to Frances Ann (née Maulsby) and William Dorsey Conway. His father was an exploring surveyor in the United States Navy, and a slave owner. In 1831, he moved with his parents to St. Augustine, Florida, and in 1832, they moved to Charleston, South Carolina. In 1840, he returned to Baltimore. He was a member of the Jefferson, Murray Institute and the Minerva, three literary societies in Baltimore. In 1843, he left school and learned the printing trade in Baltimore at the newspaper offices of the American and the Republican. He wrote for the Republican and the Argus. He studied law with Henry Stockbridge Sr. He was admitted to the bar in 1852. He was an organizer of the National Typographical Union. He was secretary and treasurer of the International Typographical Union. He was elected chairman of the executive committee of the first national convention of journeyman printers held in Baltimore on September 12, 1851.

== Career ==
Conway moved to Lawrence, Kansas, in October 1854. He practiced law there and was a correspondent with the Baltimore Sun. In March 1855, Conway was elected from Riley County to the first legislative council in the Kansas Territory, but resigned prior to assuming his seat. In 1855, he was an active member at the Free-State meeting in Big Springs and became a delegate to the Topeka Constitutional convention. From 1856 to 1857, he was chief justice of the Supreme Court under the Topeka constitution. In 1856, he delivered a speech at the Printers' Festival in Lawrence. On July 15, 1857, he was nominated as judge of the Supreme Court, but lost by 22 votes to Samuel N. Lalla. He was elected president of the constitutional convention on March 25, 1858. In April 1858, he was nominated as the Free State candidate for the U.S. House of Representatives. On May 13, 1858, as president of the constitutional convention, he signed the Leavenworth Constitution that opposed slavery in Leavenworth, Kansas. In August, he lost the Republican nomination to the House of Representatives to Marcus J. Parrott. On October 12, 1860, at the Republican state convention in Lawrence, he was nominated for the U.S. Congress. He was elected in December of that year under the Wyandotte Constitution and began serving on January 29, 1861. He was again elected as a Republican to the U.S. Congress on June 11, 1861. He lost a Republican nomination on September 17, 1862, to A. Carter Wilder. While in the U.S. House of Representatives, he was known for his opposition to slavery but also served as a member of the Washington, D.C. "peace convention" in an effort to avert civil war. His senate floor speech on admitting West Virginia to the Union on December 9, 1862, was published by The New York Times.

Conway was an agent for Kansas in the Massachusetts Abolition Society. The Emancipation Proclamation went into effect on January 1, 1863; Conway spent the day in Massachusetts with Ralph Waldo Emerson, William Lloyd Garrison, Wendell Phillips and Julia Ward Howe. In January 1863, he put forth a resolution in Congress to recognize the Confederacy then wage war on the south as war between nations. He served in the U.S. House until March 3, 1863.

Conway defended President Andrew Johnson against political assaults waged by Radical Republicans in Congress. He was nominated for the consul to Marseilles by President Johnson on June 10, 1866. He served in the role until April 16, 1869. On October 11, 1873, he fired three shots at Samuel C. Pomeroy on New York Avenue in Washington, D.C., and was subsequently arrested. After the shooting, he became a patient at St. Elizabeths Hospital (then the Government Hospital for the Insane) in Washington, D.C.

== Personal life ==
In 1851, Conway married Emily Frances Dyke. They had one daughter, Pamelia. Towards the end of his life, he lived in Washington, D.C. He died of pneumonia on February 15, 1882, at the Government Hospital for the Insane in Washington, D.C. He was buried at Rock Creek Cemetery.

U.S. House of Representatives
| Preceded by District created | Member of the U.S. House of Representatives from Kansas's at-large congressional district 1861–1863 | Succeeded by A. Carter Wilder |
