= Hays B. White =

American politician

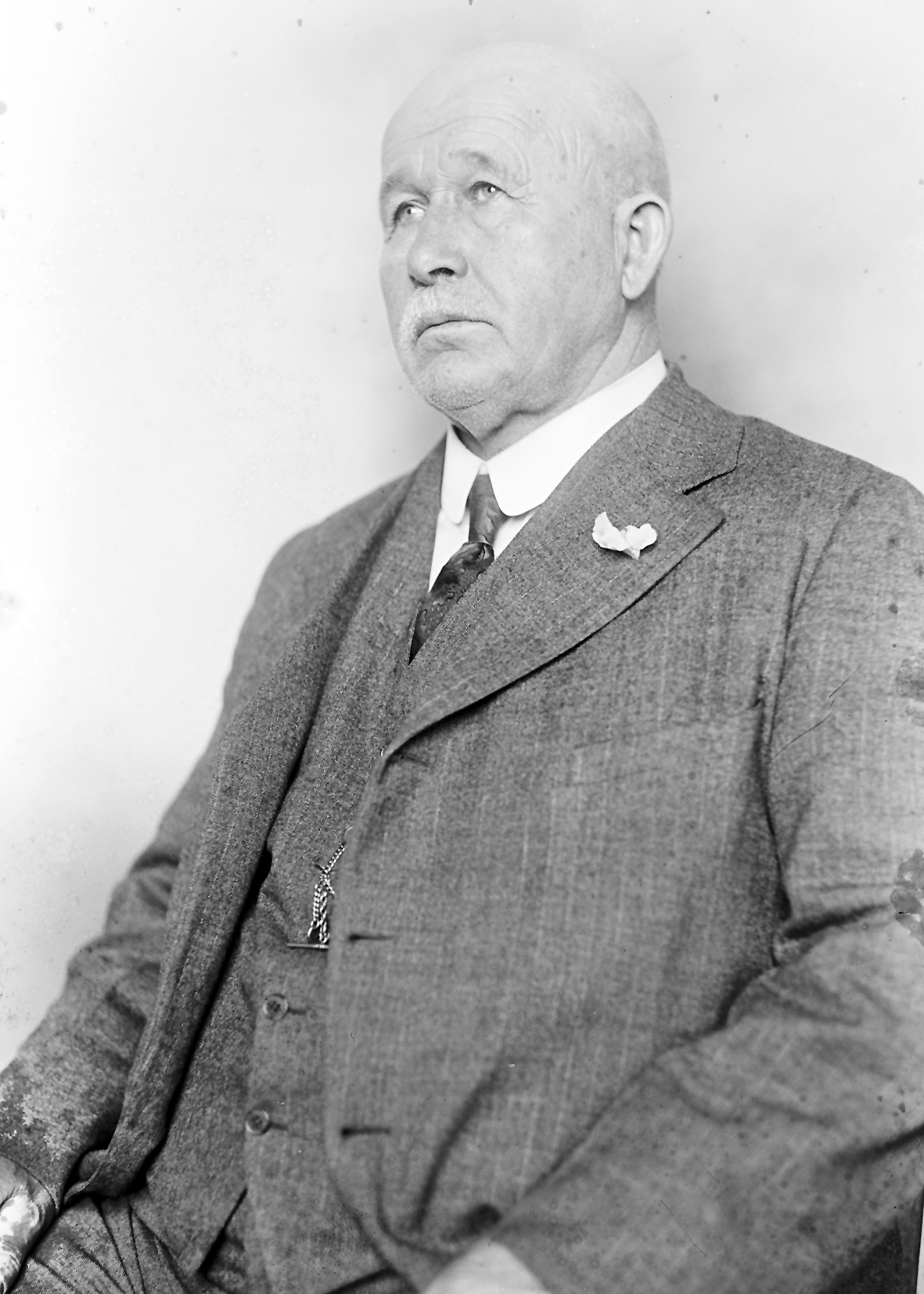

Member of the U.S. House of Representatives from Kansas's 6th district
- In office March 4, 1919 – March 3, 1929
- Preceded by: John R. Connelly
- Succeeded by: Charles I. Sparks

Member of the Kansas House of Representatives from the 33rd district
- In office 1900-1904
- Preceded by: Anson Simonds Cooke
- Succeeded by: Isaac D. Young

Member of the Kansas House of Representatives from the 103rd district
- In office 1888-1890
- Preceded by: H. Wentworth
- Succeeded by: Christopher Columbus Vandeventer

Personal details
- Born: September 21, 1855 Fairfield, Iowa
- Died: September 29, 1930 (aged 75) Mankato, Kansas
- Party: Republican

Hays Baxter White (September 21, 1855 – September 29, 1930) was a U.S. representative from Kansas.

Born near Fairfield, Iowa, White attended the rural schools of his native county. He engaged in agricultural pursuits. He moved to Jewell County, Kansas, in 1875 and engaged in agricultural pursuits near Mankato. He taught school at Mankato in 1876. He served as member of the Kansas House of Representatives from 1888 to 1890, and as a member of the Kansas State Senate from 1900 to 1904. He served as mayor of Mankato in 1914 and 1915. He served as member of the State tax commission in 1915–1918.

White was elected as a Republican to the Sixty-sixth and to the four succeeding Congresses (March 4, 1919 – March 3, 1929). He served as chairman of the Committee on Election of President, Vice President, and Representatives (Sixty-eighth through Seventieth Congresses). Election unsuccessfully contested by W.H. Clark. He was not a candidate for renomination in 1928. He died in Mankato, Kansas on September 29, 1930. He was interred in Mount Hope Cemetery.

U.S. House of Representatives
Preceded by John R. Connelly	Member of the U.S. House of Representatives from Kansas's 6th congressional district 1919-1929	Succeeded by Charles I. Sparks
