= Andrew Jackson Beale =

American politician

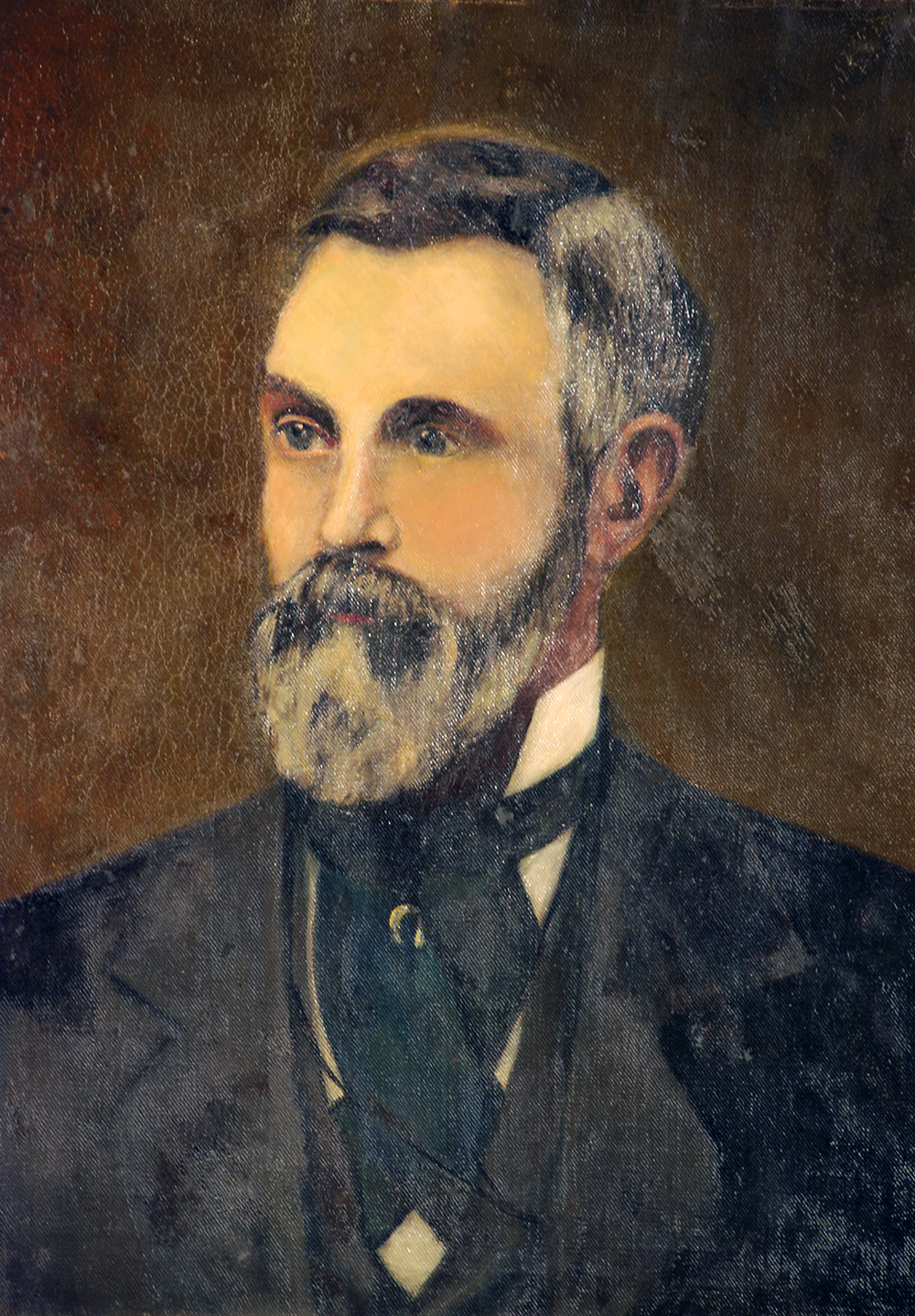
- Beale in 1890

3rd Mayor of Oklahoma City
- In office November 27, 1889 – December 30, 1889
- Preceded by: William Couch (Note: Sidney Clarke served as acting mayor November 11, 1889 – November 27, 1889.)
- Succeeded by: David Williams Gibbs

Personal details
- Born: March 18, 1831 Kentucky
- Died: January 4, 1909 (aged 77) Cynthiana, Kentucky

Andrew Jackson Beale was an American politician and confederate soldier. He served in the Kentucky Legislature before the American Civil War and as Mayor of Oklahoma City in November and December 1889.

== Biography ==
Andrew Jackson Beale was born on March 18, 1831, in Kentucky. He served in the Kentucky General Assembly before the American Civil War and later in the Confederate Army. He participated in the Land Run of 1889. He served as the Mayor of Oklahoma City between November 27, 1889, and December 30, 1889. He defeated Henry Overholser in the election to succeed William Couch. He attempted to settle land disputes while in office, but the United States barred action until the government of Oklahoma Territory was formed. He died on January 4, 1909.
