= Erastus J. Turner =

American politician

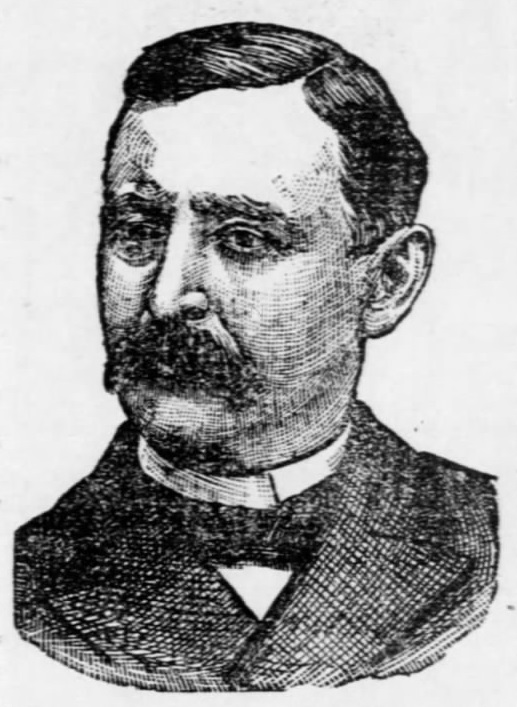
- The Hoxie Sentinel (Hoxie, Kansas), July 26, 1888

Member of the U.S. House of Representatives from Kansas's 6th district
- In office March 4, 1887 – March 3, 1891
- Preceded by: Lewis Hanback
- Succeeded by: William Baker

Personal details
- Born: December 26, 1846 Platea, Pennsylvania
- Died: February 10, 1933 (aged 86) Los Angeles, California
- Party: Republican

Erastus Johnson Turner (December 26, 1846 – February 10, 1933) was a U.S. representative from Kansas.

Born in Lockport, Pennsylvania, Turner attended college in Henry, Illinois, in 1859 and 1860. He moved to Bloomfield, Iowa, in 1860. Enlisted in Company E, 13th Iowa Volunteer Infantry Regiment, in 1864 and served until the close of the Civil War. He attended Adrian (Michigan) College 1866–1868. He was admitted to the bar in 1871 and commenced practice at Bloomfield, Iowa. He moved to Hoxie, Kansas, in 1879 and resumed the practice of law. He served as member of the Kansas House of Representatives 1881–1885. Secretary of the Kansas Board of Railroad Commissioners from April 1, 1883, to August 1, 1886.

Turner was elected as a Republican to the Fiftieth and Fifty-first Congresses (March 4, 1887 – March 3, 1891). He was not a candidate for renomination in 1890. Practiced law several years in Washington, D.C. He moved to Seattle, Washington, in 1905 and continued the practice of law. He retired from active pursuits in 1916 and moved to Los Angeles, California, where he died on February 10, 1933. He was interred in Forest Lawn Mausoleum, Glendale, California.

U.S. House of Representatives
Preceded by Lewis Hanback	Member of the U.S. House of Representatives from Kansas's 6th congressional district 1887-1891	Succeeded by William Baker
