= A. Carter Wilder =

American politician (1828-1875)

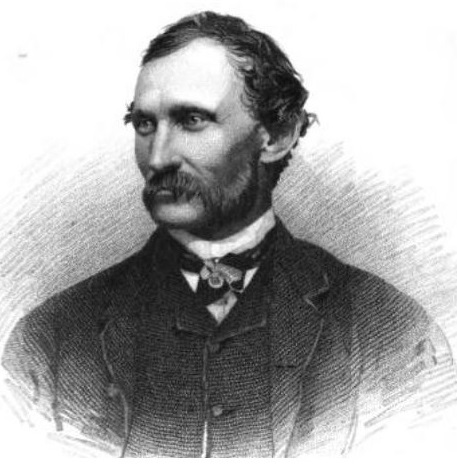

Member of the U.S. House of Representatives from Kansas's at-large district
- In office March 4, 1863 – March 3, 1865
- Preceded by: Martin F. Conway
- Succeeded by: Sidney Clarke

Personal details
- Born: Abel Carter Wilder; March 18, 1828 Mendon, Massachusetts
- Died: December 22, 1875 (aged 47) San Francisco, California
- Resting place: Mount Hope Cemetery, Rochester, New York
- Party: Republican

Abel Carter Wilder (March 18, 1828 – December 22, 1875) was an American Civil War veteran who served one term as a U.S. representative from Kansas from 1863 to 1865.

== Biography ==
Born in Mendon, Massachusetts, Wilder completed preparatory studies and engaged in mercantile pursuits. He moved to Rochester, New York, before moving again to Leavenworth, Kansas in 1857.

=== Political activities ===
He served as delegate to the Osawatomie convention in 1859. He also served as delegate to the Republican National Convention in 1860, where he led the delegates for the Kansas Territory.

=== Civil War ===
He served as a captain in the Kansas brigade for one year in the Civil War.

=== Congress ===
Wilder was elected as a Republican to the Thirty-Eighth Congress (March 4, 1863 – March 3, 1865).

=== Later career and retirement ===
He again served as delegate to the Republican National Conventions in 1864, 1868, and 1872. He returned to Rochester, New York, in 1865 and published the Morning and Evening Express until 1868, when he retired from active business pursuits.

Wilder was elected mayor of Rochester in 1872, but resigned in 1873.

=== Death and burial ===
He died in San Francisco, California, December 22, 1875, while there for his health. He was interred in Mount Hope Cemetery, Rochester, New York.

U.S. House of Representatives
Preceded by Martin F. Conway	Member of the U.S. House of Representatives from Kansas's at-large congressional district 1863–1865	Succeeded by Sidney Clarke
