= John R. Connelly =

American politician

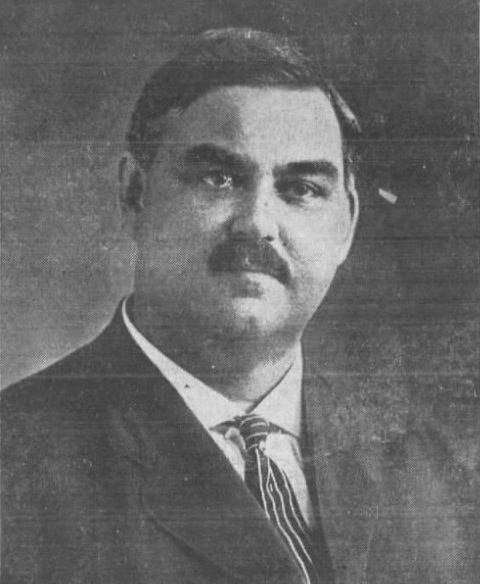

Member of the U.S. House of Representatives from Kansas's 6th district
- In office March 4, 1913 – March 3, 1919
- Preceded by: Isaac D. Young
- Succeeded by: Hays B. White

Personal details
- Born: February 27, 1870 Mount Sterling, Illinois
- Died: September 9, 1940 (aged 70) Concordia, Kansas
- Party: Democratic

John Robert Connelly (February 27, 1870 – September 9, 1940) was a U.S. representative from Kansas.

Born near Mount Sterling, Illinois, Connelly moved to Thayer County, Nebraska, with his parents in 1883. He attended the common schools and Salina (Kansas) Normal University. He moved to Thomas County, Kansas, in 1888, and homesteaded there in 1892. He began teaching school when nineteen years of age and became superintendent of schools for Thomas County 1894-1898. He was owner and editor of the Colby Free Press from 1897 to 1919. He served as mayor of Colby and as a member of the city council. He was an unsuccessful Democratic candidate for election in 1908 to the Sixty-first Congress.

Connelly was elected as a Democrat to the Sixty-third, Sixty-fourth, and Sixty-fifth Congresses (March 4, 1913 - March 3, 1919). On April 5, 1917, he was one of 50 representatives who voted against declaring war on Germany. He was an unsuccessful candidate for reelection in 1918 to the Sixty-sixth Congress. He resumed his former business pursuits. He served as delegate to the Democratic National Conventions in 1908, 1920, and 1928. He was an unsuccessful candidate for election in 1924 to the Sixty-ninth Congress. He engaged in the real-estate business at Colby, Kansas. He died in Concordia, Kansas on September 9, 1940. He was interred in Beulah Cemetery, Colby, Kansas.

U.S. House of Representatives
Preceded by Isaac D. Young	Member of the U.S. House of Representatives from Kansas's 6th congressional district 1913-1919	Succeeded by Hays B. White
