= Isaac D. Young =

American politician

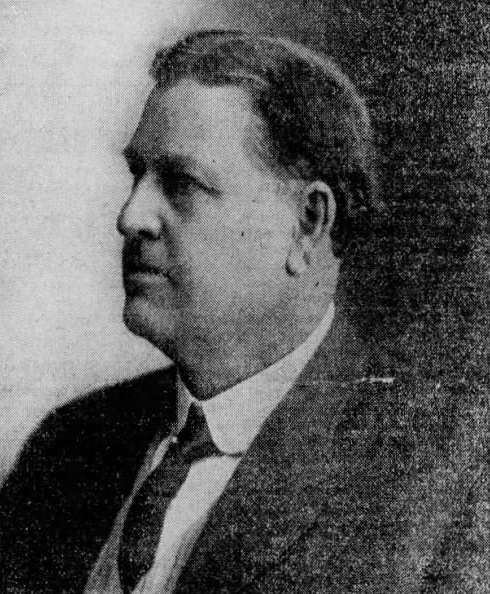
- Norton County News (Norton, Kansas), June 16, 1910

Member of the U.S. House of Representatives from Kansas's 6th district
- In office March 4, 1911 – March 3, 1913
- Preceded by: William Augustus Reeder
- Succeeded by: John R. Connelly

Member of the Kansas Senate from the 33rd district
- In office 1904-1908
- Preceded by: Hays B. White
- Succeeded by: Anson Simonds Cooke

Member of the Kansas Senate from the 29th district
- In office 1884-1888
- Preceded by: Richard M. Crane
- Succeeded by: Orsemus Bentley

Personal details
- Born: March 29, 1849 Pleasantville, Iowa, U.S.
- Died: December 10, 1927 (aged 78) Beloit, Kansas, U.S.
- Party: Republican

Isaac Daniel Young (March 29, 1849 – December 10, 1927) was a U.S. representative from Kansas.

Born near Pleasantville, Iowa, Young attended high school and Oskaloosa College in Iowa and began teaching at the age of fifteen, continuing in that profession for ten years. He moved to Mitchell County, Kansas, in 1874 and settled on a homestead in Turkey Creek Township. He engaged in agricultural pursuits for eleven years. Superintendent of public instruction of Mitchell County, Kansas from 1876 to 1880. He served as member of the State senate 1884-1888. He moved to Beloit, Kansas, in 1885. He studied law. He was admitted to the bar in 1889 and commenced practice in Beloit, Kansas. He was again a member of the State senate 1904-1908.

Young was elected as a Republican to the Sixty-second Congress (March 4, 1911 – March 3, 1913). He was an unsuccessful for reelection in 1912. He resumed the practice of law in Beloit, Kansas, until his death on December 10, 1927. He was interred in Elmwood Cemetery.

U.S. House of Representatives
Preceded by William Augustus Reeder	Member of the U.S. House of Representatives from Kansas's 6th congressional district 1911–1913	Succeeded by John R. Connelly
