= 1956 United States Senate election in Kansas =

- November 6, 1956
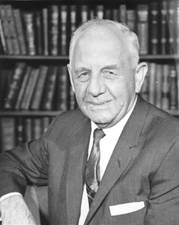

| Nominee | Frank Carlson | George Hart |
| Party | Republican | Democratic |
| Popular vote | 477,822 | 333,939 |
| Percentage | 57.90% | 40.46% |
- County results Carlson: 40–50% 50–60% 60–70% 70–80% Hart: 50–60%
U.S. senator before election
Frank Carlson
Republican
Elected U.S. Senator
Frank Carlson
Republican

The 1956 United States Senate elections in Kansas took place on November 6, 1956. Incumbent Republican Senator Frank Carlson ran for re-election to a second full term. He won a contested Republican primary and then faced George Hart, the 1954 Democratic nominee for Lieutenant Governor, in the general election. Carlson defeated Hart in a landslide, as Republican President Dwight D. Eisenhower carried Kansas in a landslide over Democratic presidential nominee Adlai Stevenson.

== Democratic primary ==
=== Candidates ===
- George Hart, furrier, 1954 Democratic nominee for Lieutenant Governor, 1955 candidate for Wichita City Commission
- Paul L. Aylward, former Ellsworth County Attorney, former State Commander for the American Legion
- Fred Kilian, Wamego farmer
- Marlyn Korf, Hodgeman County Commissioner

=== Results ===
Democratic primary results
| Party | Candidate | Votes | % |
|---|---|---|---|
| Democratic | George Hart | 54,553 | 40.35% |
| Democratic | Paul L. Aylward | 54,085 | 40.00% |
| Democratic | Fred Kilian | 16,384 | 12.12% |
| Democratic | Marlyn Korf | 10,176 | 7.53% |
| Total votes | | 135,198 | 100.00% |

== Republican primary ==
=== Candidates ===
- Frank Carlson, incumbent U.S. Senator
- Walter I. Biddle, Leavenworth City Court Judge, former Leavenworth County Attorney

=== Results ===
Republican primary results
| Party | Candidate | Votes | % |
|---|---|---|---|
| Republican | Frank Carlson (inc.) | 215,364 | 77.91% |
| Republican | Walter I. Biddle | 61,053 | 22.09% |
| Total votes | | 276,417 | 100.00% |

== General election ==
=== Results ===
1956 United States Senate election in Kansas
| Party | Candidate | Votes | % | ±% |
|---|---|---|---|---|
| Republican | Frank Carlson (inc.) | 477,822 | 57.90% | +3.65% |
| Democratic | George Hart | 333,939 | 40.46% | −3.37% |
| Prohibition | C. Floyd Hester | 13,519 | 1.64% | −0.28% |
| Majority | | 143,883 | 17.43% | +7.01% |
| Total votes | | 825,280 | 100.00% | |
| Republican hold | | | | |

== See also ==
- 1956 United States Senate elections
