= Charles I. Sparks =

American politician

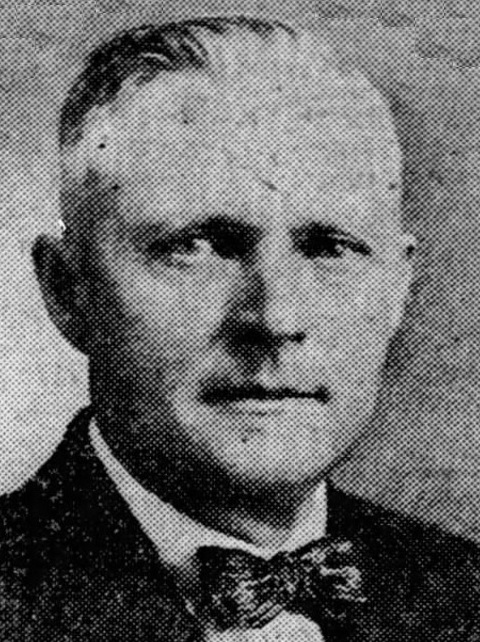
- Associated Press photo from the November 16, 1928 edition of the Daily Clarion-Ledger (Jackson, MS)

Member of the U.S. House of Representatives from Kansas's 6th district
- In office March 4, 1929 – March 3, 1933
- Preceded by: Hays B. White
- Succeeded by: Kathryn O'Loughlin McCarthy

Personal details
- Born: December 20, 1872 Jackson Township, Iowa
- Died: April 30, 1937 (aged 64) Goodland, Kansas
- Party: Republican

Charles Isaac Sparks (December 20, 1872 – April 30, 1937) was a U.S. representative from Kansas.

Born on a farm near Ontario, in Jackson Township, Iowa, Sparks was educated in the rural schools and Simpson College, Indianola, Iowa. He was graduated from the law department of the State University of Iowa at Iowa City in 1896. He was admitted to the bar the same year and commenced practice in Boone, Iowa. He served as prosecuting attorney of Boone County 1899-1902. He served as chairman of the Republican county committee in 1898. He moved to Goodland, Kansas, in 1907 and continued the practice of law. He served as city attorney and was a member of the Goodland School Board. He served as judge of the thirty-fourth judicial district of Kansas 1915-1929.

Sparks was elected as a Republican to the Seventy-first and Seventy-second Congresses (March 4, 1929 – March 3, 1933). He was one of the managers appointed by the House of Representatives in 1933 to conduct the impeachment proceedings against Harold Louderback, judge of the United States District Court for the Northern District of California. He was an unsuccessful candidate for reelection in 1932 to the Seventy-third Congress. He resumed the practice of law in Goodland, Kansas, until his death there on April 30, 1937. He was interred in the Goodland Cemetery.

U.S. House of Representatives
Preceded by Hays B. White	Member of the U.S. House of Representatives from Kansas's 6th congressional district 1929–1933	Succeeded by Kathryn O'Loughlin McCarthy
