= Senator McCarty =

Senator McCarty may refer to:

- Chester E. McCarty (1905–1999), Oregon State Senate
- John McCarty (New York) (1782–1851), New York State Senate

== See also ==
- Senator McCarthy (disambiguation)
