= William Augustus Reeder =

American politician

William A. Reeder
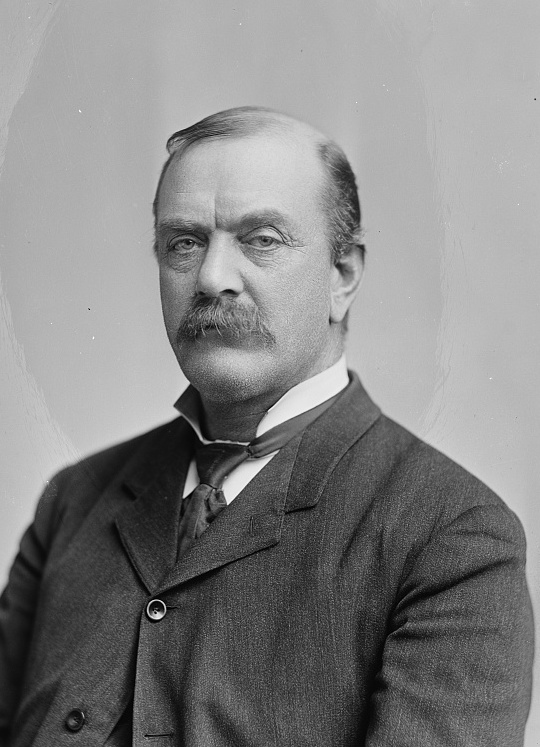
- Reeder photographed by CM Bell studio

Member of the U.S. House of Representatives from Kansas's 6th district
- In office March 4, 1899 – March 3, 1911
- Preceded by: Nelson B. McCormick
- Succeeded by: Isaac D. Young

Personal details
- Born: William Augustus Reeder; August 28, 1849 Shippensburg, Pennsylvania, U.S.
- Died: November 7, 1929 (aged 80) Beverly Hills, California, U.S.
- Party: Republican
- Spouse: Eunice H Andrews Reeder (m. 1876; died 1921)
- Children: Leland Parker Reeder
- Occupation: Banker; Farmer

William Augustus Reeder (August 28, 1849 – November 7, 1929) was a U.S. representative from Kansas.

Born near Shippensburg, Pennsylvania, Reeder moved with his parents to Ipava, Illinois, in 1853, attended the public schools, and "at the age of 14, he began teaching in the public schools, a vocation he followed until 30 years of age". Reeder moved to Beloit, Kansas, in 1871, and served as principal of the Beloit public schools from 1871-1879. Reeder then moved to Logan, Kansas, in 1880, and engaged in banking there. Reeder was interested in irrigation farming 1891-1901.

Reeder was elected as a Republican to the Fifty-sixth and to the five succeeding congresses (March 4, 1899 – March 3, 1911). serving as chairman of the committee on mileage during the (Fifty-seventh, Fifty-eighth, and Fifty-ninth congresses), and on the committee on the irrigation of arid lands during Sixtieth and Sixty-first congresses. Reeder was an unsuccessful candidate for renomination in 1910.

Reeder moved to Los Angeles, California, in 1911 and to Beverly Hills, California, in 1913, where he engaged in banking and in the real estate business until 1926. He died in Beverly Hills, California, on November 7, 1929, and was interred in Hollywood Cemetery, Hollywood, California.

U.S. House of Representatives
| Preceded by Nelson B. McCormick | Member of the U.S. House of Representatives from Kansas's 6th congressional district 1899-1911 | Succeeded by Isaac D. Young |
