= Frank Carlson Library =

Coordinates: 39°34′13″N 97°39′35″W

Frank Carlson Library sign, September 2007

The Frank Carlson Library is a public library in Concordia, Kansas. The library is named for former Governor of Kansas, State Representative, Representative, and Senator Frank Carlson, a long-time resident of Concordia. The library was constructed in 1976.

== Special items ==
In addition to traditional books available for checkout, the library displays many items of memorabilia from the life of Frank Carlson.

The library also has an extensive collection of video and audio tapes available for check out. The Cloud County Genealogical Society has a large collection of reference material stored at the library.

== Frank Carlson Room ==
=== Frank Carlson: Prairie Politician Exhibit ===
In April 2011, the Frank Carlson Library received a mini grant from the Kansas Humanities Council to renovate the Frank Carlson Room. The grant provided funding for the development of a new exhibit dedicated to telling new generations of Kansans about Carlson’s life and political career. Coinciding with the yearlong Kansas 150 Commemoration, the renovation was part of a statewide initiative to preserve the memory of important people and events in the state’s past.

Frank Carlson: Prairie Politician opened to the public on November 5, 2011. The open house was attended by Carlson’s family and friends, members of the local community, and state representatives. Library visitors can view the exhibit. Guided tours are available upon request.

Among the items on display are a check from President Dwight D. Eisenhower, written to Carlson in settlement of a friendly bet, several pens used by President Lyndon B. Johnson to sign important legislation that Carlson helped to create and pass, and Carlson’s elephant figurine collection. The exhibit also contains artifacts that tie Carlson to Concordia. On display are the school bell from the schoolhouse Carlson attended in Cloud County, caricatures and political cartoons drawn by fellow Concordian Don Musik, and keepsakes on loan from Carlson’s friends and family.

The exhibit showcases keepsakes from the library's grand opening celebration, including the ribbon from the ribbon cutting, an invitation to the event, a grand opening pin, and photographs of Senator Carlson giving a speech on the library lawn. Once the library opened, Senator Carlson celebrated his birthday in the Carlson room each year.
