= Kathryn O'Loughlin McCarthy =

American politician (1894–1952)

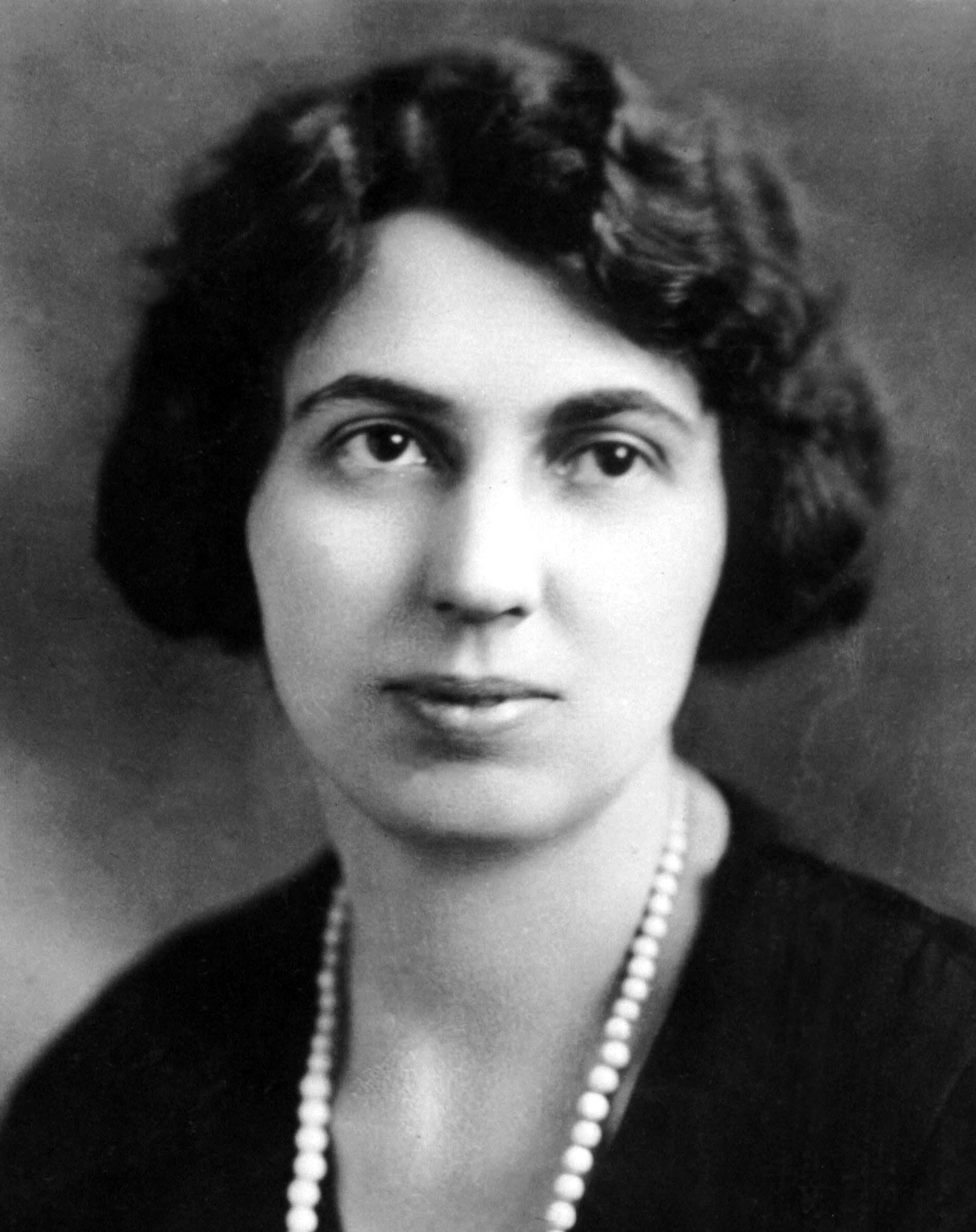

Member of the U.S. House of Representatives from Kansas's 6th district
- In office March 4, 1933 – January 3, 1935
- Preceded by: Charles I. Sparks
- Succeeded by: Frank Carlson

Member of the Kansas House of Representatives
- In office 1931–1932

Personal details
- Born: April 24, 1894 Hays, Kansas, U.S.
- Died: January 16, 1952 (aged 57) Hays, Kansas, U.S.
- Party: Democratic
- Spouse: Daniel M. McCarthy

Kathryn Ellen O'Loughlin (April 24, 1894 – January 16, 1952) was a U.S. representative from Kansas. After her election, she was married to Daniel M. McCarthy, who served in the Kansas State Senate, and thereupon served under the name of Kathryn O'Loughlin McCarthy. She was the first woman elected to Congress from Kansas.

Born near Hays, Kansas, O'Loughlin attended rural schools. She graduated from the Hays (Kansas) High School in 1913, from the Kansas State Teachers College in 1917, and from the law school of the University of Chicago in 1920. She was admitted to the bar in 1921 and commenced practice in Chicago, but she returned to Kansas in 1928 and continued the practice of law in Hays. She served as a delegate to the State Democratic conventions in 1930, 1931, 1932, 1934, and 1936, and she served the Democratic National Conventions in 1940 and 1944. She also served as a member of the Kansas House of Representatives in 1931 and 1932.

O'Loughlin was elected as a Democrat to the Seventy-third Congress (March 4, 1933 – January 3, 1935), defeating Clyde Short in the primary and Charles I. Sparks in the general election. She was an unsuccessful candidate for reelection to the Seventy-fourth Congress. Her support for the New Deal angered Kansas Republicans, including Governor Alf Landon, who promised to have her defeated. Public opinion in Kansas had shifted against the New Deal, especially the Agricultural Adjustment Act, which McCarthy strongly supported. The GOP nominated Frank Carlson, the chair of the Kansas Republican Party and close ally of Governor Landon. McCarthy was narrowly defeated by Carlson by a margin of 51%–49%, or just under 2,800 votes. Carlson would go on to become one of the most powerful politicians in Kansas history, serving as Governor and later representing the state in the US Senate.

In 1937, McCarthy condemned the forced sterilization of 62 inmates of the Kansas Industrial School for Girls in Beloit, Kansas. In an article published in the Abilene Reflector called, McCarthy called for a formal investigation of the school.

After this, she resumed the practice of law. She also owned and operated a large ranch and was part owner of an automobile agency at Hays and Ellis, Kansas. O'Loughlin died in Hays, Kansas, and she was interred in St. Joseph's Cemetery.

== See also ==
- Women in the United States House of Representatives

U.S. House of Representatives
Preceded by Charles I. Sparks	Member of the U.S. House of Representatives from Kansas's 6th congressional district 1933-1935	Succeeded by Frank Carlson
