= David P. Lowe =

American politician

David Perley Lowe
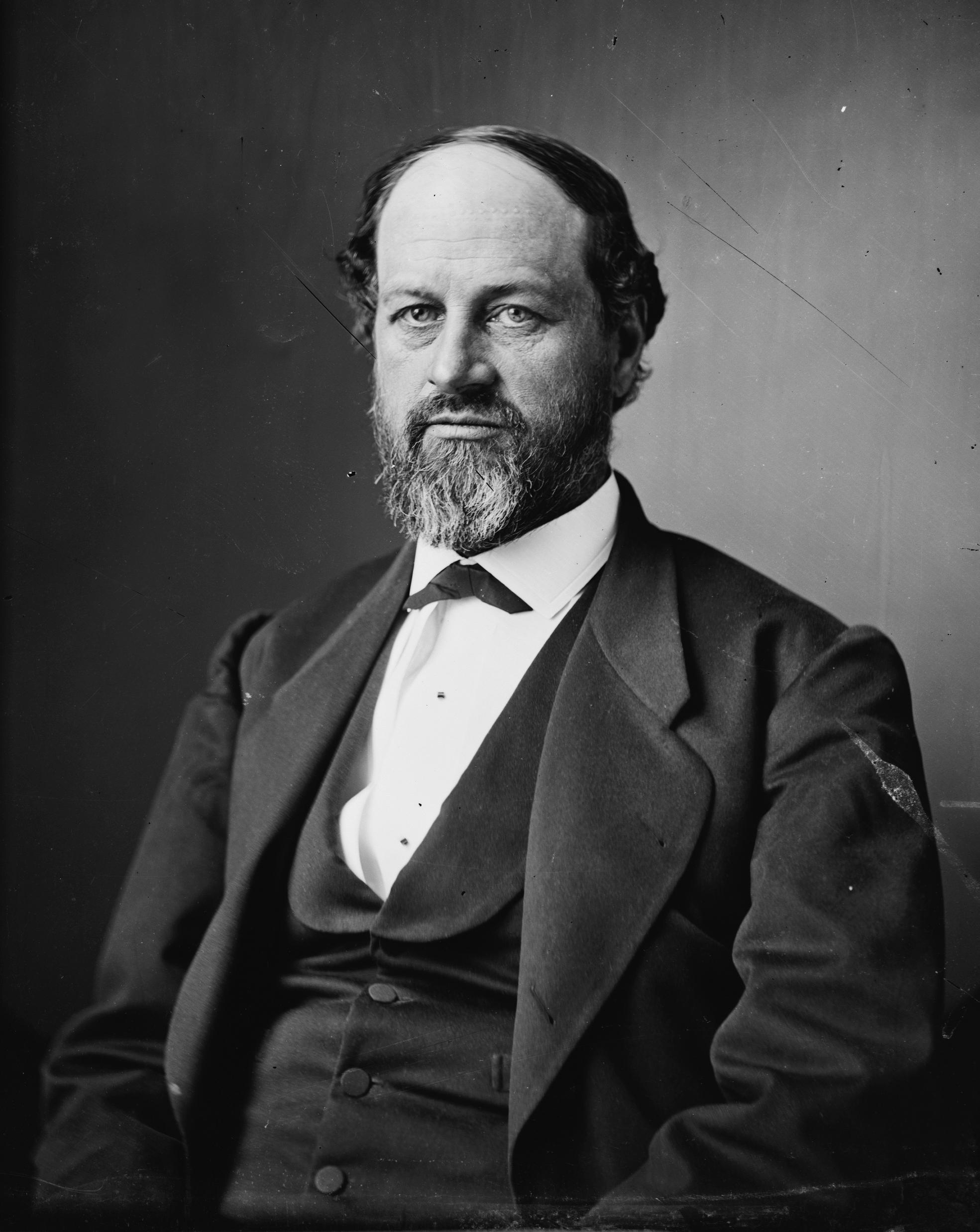

Member of the U.S. House of Representatives from Kansas's at-large district
- In office March 4, 1871 – March 3, 1875
- Preceded by: Sidney Clarke
- Succeeded by: Seat eliminated

Personal details
- Born: August 22, 1823 Utica, New York, US
- Died: April 10, 1882 (aged 58) Fort Scott, Kansas, US
- Resting place: Evergreen Cemetery
- Party: Republican

David Perley Lowe (August 22, 1823 – April 10, 1882) was an American lawyer and politician who served two terms as a representative from Kansas from 1871 to 1875.

== Biography ==
He graduated from the Cincinnati Law College in 1851 and was admitted to the bar and commenced practice in Cincinnati, Ohio. He moved to Mound City, Kansas, in 1861 and continued the practice of law.

=== Career ===
He was a member of the State senate in 1863 and 1864 and served as a judge of the sixth judicial district 1867-1871. He moved to Fort Scott in 1870 and was elected as a Republican to the Forty-second and Forty-third Congresses (March 4, 1871 – March 3, 1875). He was chairman of the Committee on Mines and Mining (Forty-third United States Congress) but declined to be a candidate for renomination in 1874.

=== After Congress ===
He was appointed chief justice of Utah Territory by President Ulysses S. Grant in 1875. He returned to Kansas and settled in Fort Scott, Bourbon County, and was again elected judge of the sixth judicial district of Kansas in 1879 and served until his death in Fort Scott, Kansas, April 10, 1882.

== Legacy ==
Perhaps best remembered for his support of civil rights legislation, Lowe was quoted by the Supreme Court of the United States in 1961 in Monroe v. Pape, discussing Congressional debate of the 1871 Civil Rights Act (Ku Klux Klan Act):

While murder is stalking abroad in disguise, while whippings and lynchings and banishments have been visited upon unoffending American citizens, the local administrations have been found inadequate or unwilling to apply the proper corrective. Combinations, darker than the night [which] hides them, conspiracies, wicked as the worst felons could devise, have gone unwhipped of justice. Immunity is given to crime, and the records of the public tribunals are searched in vain for any evidence of effective redress.

U.S. House of Representatives
Preceded by Sidney Clarke	Member of the U.S. House of Representatives from Kansas's at-large congressional district 1871–1875	Succeeded by Seat eliminated
