= 1946 Kansas gubernatorial election =

- November 5, 1946
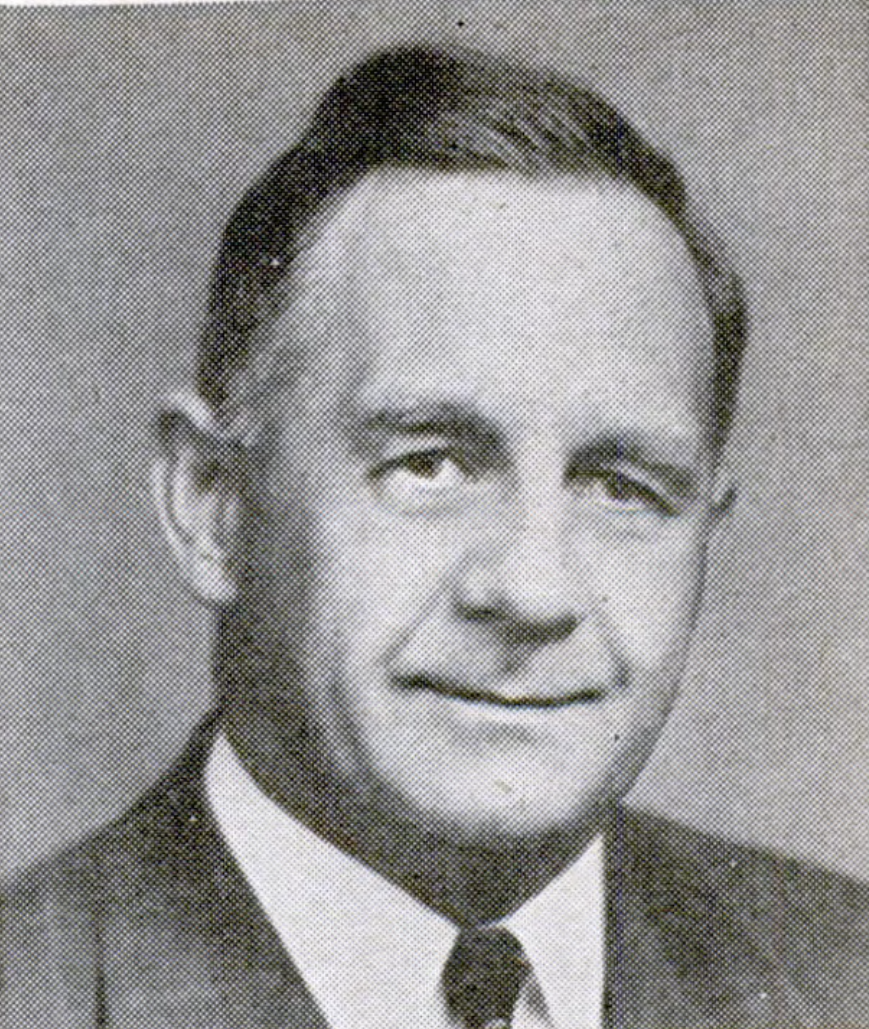

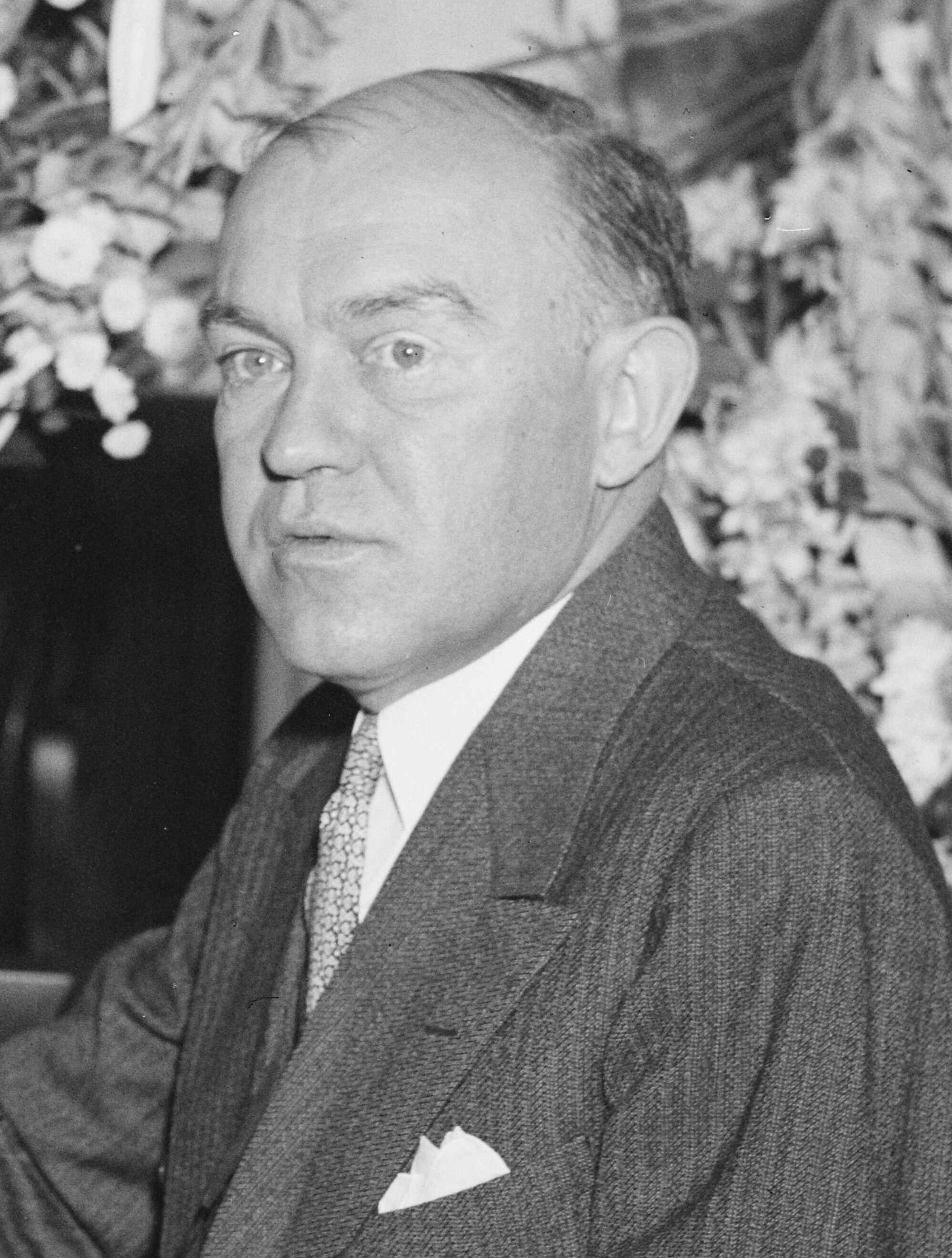
Nominee	Frank Carlson	Harry Hines Woodring
Party	Republican	Democratic
Popular vote	309,064	254,283
Percentage	53.50%	44.02%
- County results Carlson: 40–50% 50–60% 60–70% Woodring: 40–50% 50–60% 60–70%
Governor before election
Andrew Frank Schoeppel
Republican
Elected Governor
Frank Carlson
Republican

The 1946 Kansas gubernatorial election was held on November 5, 1946. Republican nominee Frank Carlson defeated Democratic nominee Harry Hines Woodring with 53.50% of the vote.

== General election ==
=== Candidates ===
Major party candidates

- Frank Carlson, Republican
- Harry H. Woodring, Democratic

Other candidates

- David C. White, Prohibition
- Harry Graber, Socialist

=== Results ===
1946 Kansas gubernatorial election
Party	Candidate	Votes	%	±%
Republican	Frank Carlson	309,064	53.50%	
Democratic	Harry H. Woodring	254,283	44.02%	
Prohibition	David C. White	12,517	2.17%	
Socialist	Harry Graber	1,830	0.32%	
Majority		231,700		
Turnout				
Republican hold		Swing		
