= Daniel W. McCarthy =

American classical composer

Daniel William McCarthy (born 1955, Onekama, Michigan) is an American composer, author, conductor, professor, and black belt martial artist. He has been professor and chair of music composition and theory studies at The University of Akron: School of Music and held the Theodor Dreiser Distinguished Research/Creativity Award at Indiana State University School of Music. He is co-author of "Theory for Today's Musician" with Ralph Turek, published by Routledge Francis & Taylor, NYC ? His career as a conductor included serving on the conducting staff of the Cleveland Chamber Symphony, four seasons as music director of the Interlochen Festival Orchestra, Interlochen, Michigan, as well as conducting the University of Akron Symphony Orchestra and the Terre Haute Symphony Youth Orchestra. McCarthy, a dedicated martial artist, was promoted to 3rd Degree Black Belt in Chun Ma Tae Kwon Do in May 2012. A student of Grand Master Jeon Gyeong Ho, Akron, Ohio , he pursued additional studies in Asian Weapons, American Kenpo, and Chin Na Kung Fu with Grand Master Sifu James Adkins in Traverse City, Michigan .

== Career ==
Daniel McCarthy’s career as a conductor included serving on the conducting staff of the Cleveland Chamber Symphony. McCarthy worked for four seasons as Music Director of the Interlochen Festival Orchestra, Interlochen, Michigan, as well as conducting the University of Akron Symphony Orchestra and the Terre Haute Symphony Youth Orchestra. McCarthy is a widely performed composer with over 100 titles in the catalog of C. Alan Publications (Greensboro, North Carolina) and 30 recordings (current as of April, 2012) on the Albany, Centaur, D'note Classics, Gesparo, Klavier, Capstone, MMC, Potenzamusic, and Xolo Record labels. His wind and percussion music has appeared on numerous repertoire lists throughout American music schools and studios. His music has been performed throughout the world by groups such as the Brevard Festival Orchestra, the Interlochen World Youth Symphony Orchestra, the University of North Texas Wind Symphony, the Taiwan Wind Ensemble, the Slovak Radio Orchestra, the United States Marine Corps. Band (D.C.), the U.S. Army Jazz Ambassadors, The Akron, Amarillo, Cleveland Chamber, and Naples Symphony Orchestras. His music has also been performed by soloists such as Barrick Stees of the Cleveland Orchestra, Michael Burritt of the Eastman School of Music, William Moersch of the University of Illinois, Timothy McAllister of Northwestern University, Mark Ford of the University of North Texas, and Vincent DiMartino, former Distinguished Artist in Residence at Centre College in Danville, Kentucky.

McCarthy, a dedicated martial artist, achieved promoted to 3rd Degree Black Belt in Chun Ma Tae Kwon Do and Asian Weapons in May 2012. A student of Grand Master Jeon Gyeong Ho, Akron, Ohio [2], he pursued additional studies in American Kenpo, and Chin Na Kung Fu with Grand Master Sifu James Adkins in Traverse City, Michigan [3].

== Works ==
McCarthy’s early music (1985-1999) would be best described as ElectroAcoustic but now his music style is funk, a hybrid of rock and jazz. McCarthy works at home in his basement studio where he produces his music. Usually his electronic music with live soloists or chamber ensemble and acoustic chamber music usually featuring an instrumental soloist. He frequently wrote for soloists who played instruments previously neglected by composers such as the marimba, tuba, euphonium, viola, saxophone, and bassoon. Much of the music he wrote during this period was influenced by J.R.R. Tolkien's The Lord of the Rings. His musical language was eclectic, ranging from non-serial atonality to tertian and modal harmonies, frequently contrapuntal, and had a high degree of metric/rhythmic animation. This musical language reflected his previous occupation as a commercial musician in jazz, funk, and rock genres. However, he had an abiding love for the music of Gustav Mahler and Igor Stravinsky which manifested itself in dark, somber musical moods. One of McCarthy’s early work is “Rimbasly” composed for the marimba and synthesizer, commissioned in 1989 by Michael Buritt of Eastman School of Music.

His writing style began to change coinciding with his appointment as Chair of Composition and Theory at the University of Akron School of Music (2000-2014). He became increasingly interested in his relationships with performers, writing music tailored to their virtuosic abilities and musical personalities (Barrick Stees, the Cleveland Orchestra, the Avalon, Harrington, and Arianna String Quartets, U.S. Marine Corps. Tuba/Euphonium Quartet, Timothy McAllister, Northwestern University, Joseph Lulloff, Michigan State University, Michael Burritt, The Eastman School of Music, among others). His compositional style generated music that was uniquely American and unique to himself as a boy who grew up in rural northern Michigan. This resulted in music that reflected McCarthy's adolescent persona such as "Turn the Page" for electric guitar and orchestra (based on a guitar solo played by Jimmy Page from the rock group Led Zeppelin), and "Chamber Symphony No. 4 for Saxophone and Winds" inspired by the music of the funk group Tower of Power. This period of creativity fostered McCarthy's general philosophy of anti-elitism in arts and culture and an aversion to academe; hence, the atypical combination of his occupation of composer and martial artist.

== Early life ==
McCarthy’s early life during the 60s would listen to the Beatles, Beach Boys, Jackson 5 and anything else that was going on, he was also exposed to opera, his earliest memory of music was his mom singing opera music by Verdi. His mother studied at Cleveland Institute of Music, and his older brothers also are art professionals. McCarthy’s brothers introduced him to Mahler, Stravinsky and Shostakovich.

McCarthy attend Interlochen High School and found jazz. He found the love of jazz through a drummer named Peter Erskine who was in a jazz band. McCarthy played the trumpet, his favorite instrument at that time. He originally wanted to be a symphony trumpet player, his teacher, John Lindenau criticized that McCarthy was very inconsistent and wouldn’t win an audition.
