= 1962 United States Senate election in Kansas =

- November 6, 1962
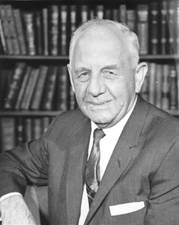

Nominee	Frank Carlson	K.L. Smith
Party	Republican	Democratic
Popular vote	388,500	223,630
Percentage	62.44%	35.94%
- County results Carlson: 50–60% 60–70% 70–80% Smith: 50–60%
U.S. senator before election
Frank Carlson
Republican
Elected U.S. Senator
Frank Carlson
Republican

The 1962 United States Senate election in Kansas was held on November 6, 1962. Incumbent Republican Senator Frank Carlson was re-elected to a third term in office over Democratic nominee Ken Smith.

== Primary elections ==
Primary elections were held on August 7, 1962.

=== Democratic primary ===
==== Candidates ====
- K. L. "Ken" Smith, unsuccessful Democratic candidate for Secretary of State of Kansas in 1960
- Joseph J. Poizner

==== Results ====
Democratic primary results
Party	Candidate	Votes	%
Democratic	K. L. "Ken" Smith	65,876	62.54
Democratic	Joseph J. Poizner	39.458	37.46
Total votes		105,334	100.00

=== Republican primary ===
==== Candidates ====
- Frank Carlson, incumbent U.S. Senator
- Joe Corpstein, farmer

==== Results ====
Republican primary results
Party	Candidate	Votes	%
Republican	Frank Carlson (incumbent)	167,498	86.94
Republican	Joe Corpstein	25,168	13.06
Total votes		192,666	100.00

== General election ==
=== Candidates ===
- Frank Carlson, incumbent Senator (Republican)
- George E. Kline, retired pastor from McPherson (Prohibition)
- Ken L. Smith, former State Highway Department employee from Wichita (Democratic)

=== Results ===
1962 U.S. Senate election in Kansas
Party	Candidate	Votes	%	±%
Republican	Frank Carlson (incumbent)	388,500	62.44%	▲5.46
Democratic	Ken L. Smith	223,630	35.94%	▼4.52
Prohibition	George E. Kline	10,098	1.62%	▼0.02
Total votes		622,228	100.00%	
Republican hold				

== See also ==
- 1962 United States Senate elections

== Bibliography ==
- Congressional Elections, 1946-1996. Washington, D.C.: Congressional Quarterly Inc. 1998. ISBN 1-56802-248-4.
- Scammon, Richard M., ed. (1964). America Votes 5: a handbook of contemporary American election statistics, 1962. Washington, D.C.: Governmental Affairs Institute.
