= Frank Carlson =

American politician

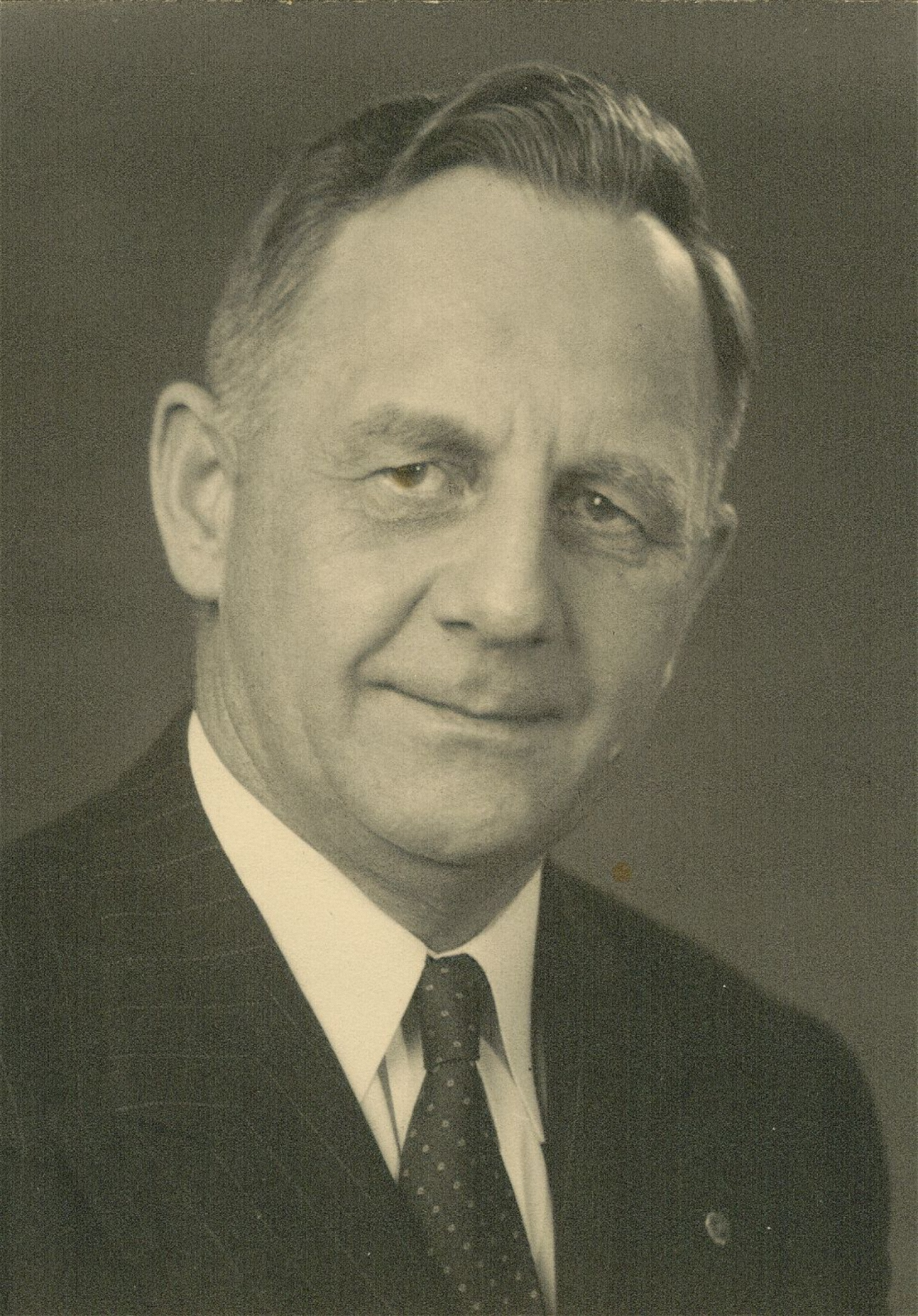
- Carlson while serving c. 1950s

United States Senator from Kansas
- In office November 29, 1950 – January 3, 1969
- Preceded by: Harry Darby
- Succeeded by: Bob Dole

Chair of the National Governors Association
- In office June 19, 1949 – June 18, 1950
- Preceded by: William Preston Lane Jr.
- Succeeded by: Frank Lausche

30th Governor of Kansas
- In office January 13, 1947 – November 28, 1950
- Lieutenant: Frank L. Hagaman
- Preceded by: Andrew Frank Schoeppel
- Succeeded by: Frank L. Hagaman

Member of the U.S. House of Representatives from Kansas's 6th district
- In office January 3, 1935 – January 3, 1947
- Preceded by: Kathryn O'Loughlin McCarthy
- Succeeded by: Wint Smith

Personal details
- Born: January 23, 1893 Cloud County, Kansas, U.S.
- Died: May 30, 1987 (aged 94) Concordia, Kansas, U.S.
- Party: Republican
- Spouse: Alice Fredrickson (m. 1919)
- Education: Cloud County Community College; Kansas State University

Military service
- Allegiance: United States
- Branch/service: United States Army
- Years of service: 1918–1919
- Rank: Private
- Battles/wars: World War I

Frank Carlson (January 23, 1893 – May 30, 1987) was an American politician who served as the 30th governor of Kansas, Kansas State representative, United States representative, and United States senator from Kansas. Carlson is the only Kansan to have held all four offices. His political career spanned 40 years, beginning in November 1928 and ending in January 1969.

== Early life and education ==
Carlson was born in 1893 near Concordia, Kansas, the son of Anna (Johannesson) and Charles Eric Carlson, both Swedish immigrants. He attended public schools and Kansas State University before serving in World War I as a private.

== Career ==
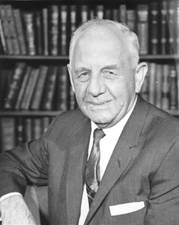
Carlson later in his career

After the war, he returned to Concordia to farm. He was elected as a Republican to first the Kansas House of Representatives in 1928 and then to the United States House of Representatives, where he served from 1935 to 1947.

In 1946 he was elected governor of Kansas. As governor, he pushed mental health programs as well as a long-term highway project. In 1949, Kansas U.S. Senator Clyde M. Reed died, and Carlson appointed Harry Darby to fill the seat. Darby continued his service in the Senate until Carlson himself was elected to fill the seat in 1950. Instead of waiting until January to be sworn in, he took his seat on November 28, 1950, leaving the office of governor to Frank L. Hagaman who served less than two months.

In 1952, he campaigned for Dwight D. Eisenhower, and then brokered a deal through Ohio Senator Robert A. Taft and became Senate majority leader. According to Billy Graham's biography Just As I Am, Carlson invited Eisenhower to the Senate Prayer Breakfast, which thus became the first Presidential Prayer Breakfast, thereafter an annual assembly of all three branches of government, continuing to this day. Carlson was re-elected twice, in 1956 and 1962, before returning to Concordia for retirement.

Carlson served a term as president of the United States Senate Prayer Breakfast Group. He was therein featured by U.S. News & World Report on July 1, 1968, by editor David Lawrence, for his strong moral and spiritual influence in the nation's capital. He was also a member of the board of directors of World Vision.

Carlson voted in favor of the Senate amendment to the Civil Rights Act of 1957 on August 7, 1957, but did not vote on the House amendment to the bill on August 29, 1957 or the Civil Rights Act of 1960. Carlson voted in favor of the Civil Rights Acts of 1964 and 1968, as well as the 24th Amendment to the U.S. Constitution, the Voting Rights Act of 1965, and the confirmation of Thurgood Marshall to the U.S. Supreme Court.

== Death ==
Carlson died in 1987 in Concordia and was buried there in Pleasant Hill Cemetery. The federal court building in Topeka is named in his honor, US 81 from the Nebraska state line north of Belleville to Salina is named the Frank Carlson Memorial Highway, the Frank Carlson Library in Concordia is named in his honor, and Wichita State University hosts the Frank Carlson Lecture Series.

== Frank Carlson Library ==
In April 2011, the Frank Carlson Library in Concordia, Kansas, received a mini grant from the Kansas Humanities Council to renovate the library's Frank Carlson Room. The grant funded the development of a new exhibit dedicated to telling new generations of Kansans about Carlson's life and political career. Coinciding with the yearlong Kansas 150 Commemoration, the renovation was part of a statewide initiative to preserve the memory of important people and events in the state's past. Senator Frank Carlson is the only Kansan to have held four major public offices and is known as "Kansas' Favorite Son".

The renovation project replaced the original Frank Carlson display, created in 1976 and shown until the summer of 2011. The new exhibit, Frank Carlson: Prairie Politician, tells and preserves Senator Carlson's story through an updated exhibit and modern archival techniques. The exhibit showcases Carlson memorabilia, photographs, and items from the Senator's personal collection, which is housed in the Frank Carlson Library. Senator Carlson's story is told in three parts, beginning with his childhood and church leadership in Concordia, Kansas, following him through his forty-year political career, and celebrating his legacy as a political figure and an important local figure.

Among the items on display are a check from President Dwight D. Eisenhower, written to Carlson in settlement of a friendly bet, several pens used by President Lyndon B. Johnson to sign important legislation that Carlson supported, and Carlson's elephant figurine collection. The exhibit also includes artifacts that tie Carlson to his hometown and home state. On display are the school bell from the schoolhouse Carlson attended in Cloud County, Kansas, caricatures and political cartoons drawn by fellow Concordian Don Musik, and keepsakes on loan from Carlson's friends and family.

U.S. House of Representatives
Preceded by Kathryn O'Loughlin McCarthy	Member of the U.S. House of Representatives from Kansas's 6th congressional district 1935–1947	Succeeded by Wint Smith
Political offices
Preceded by Andrew Frank Schoeppel	Governor of Kansas; 1947–1950	Succeeded by Frank L. Hagaman
Preceded by William Preston Lane Jr.	Chair of the National Governors Association; 1949–1950	Succeeded by Frank Lausche
Party political offices
Preceded by Andrew Frank Schoeppel	Republican nominee for Governor of Kansas; 1946, 1948	Succeeded by Edward F. Arn
Preceded by Clyde M. Reed	Republican nominee for U.S. Senator from Kansas (Class 3); 1950, 1956, 1962	Succeeded by Bob Dole
U.S. Senate
Preceded by Harry Darby	U.S. Senator (Class 3) from Kansas; 1950–1969; Served alongside: Andrew Frank Schoeppel, James B. Pearson	Succeeded by Bob Dole
