= Dan McCarthy (hurler) =

Irish hurler (1918–??)

Personal information
- Native name: Dónall Mac Cárthaigh (Irish)
- Born: 1918 (age 107–108) Ballincollig, County Cork, Ireland

Sport
- Sport: Hurling
- Position: Full-forward
Club
- Years: Club
- Ballincollig
Club titles
- Cork titles: 0
Inter-county
Years	County	Apps (scores)
1941	Cork	0 (0-00)
Inter-county titles
- Munster titles: 0
- All-Irelands: 0
- NHL: 0

Daniel McCarthy (born 1918) was an Irish hurler who played as a full-forward for the Cork senior team.

McCarthy joined the team during the 1941 championship and was an unused substitute for that year's campaign. It was a successful year for Cork and McCarthy won an All-Ireland medal as a member of the extended panel.

At club level McCarthy was a three-time county club championship runner-up with Ballincollig.

== Playing career ==
=== Club ===
McCarthy played his club hurling with Ballincollig and enjoyed much success.

In 1939 McCarthy won an intermediate championship medal as Ballincollig defeated Ballinora by 4-6 to 4-4.

McCarthy's side subsequently earned the unwanted distinction of losing three successive championship deciders to Glen Rovers and St. Finbarr's (twice) between 1941 and 1943.

=== Inter-county ===
McCarthy first came to prominence on the inter-county scene as a member of the Cork minor hurling team when he was unused substitute in 1933. Three years later he was recalled to the starting fifteen for the All-Ireland final against Kilkenny. A narrow 2-4 to 2-3 defeat was McCarthy's lot on that occasion.

An outbreak of foot and mouth disease severely hampered the 1941 championship as McCarthy joined the team. As a result of this Cork were nominated to represent the province in the All-Ireland series. McCarthy was an unused substitute for the final against Dublin. At the full-time whistle Cork had won by 5-11 to 0-6. It was one of the most one-sided championship deciders of all-time, however, it did give McCarthy an All-Ireland medal, albeit as a sub.

== Honours ==
=== Team ===
Ballincollig

- Cork Intermediate Hurling Championship (1): 1939

Cork

- All-Ireland Senior Hurling Championship (1): 1941 (sub)
