= Harry Darby =

American politician

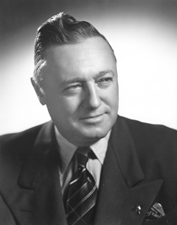

United States Senator from Kansas
- In office December 2, 1949 – November 28, 1950
- Appointed by: Frank Carlson
- Preceded by: Clyde M. Reed
- Succeeded by: Frank Carlson

Personal details
- Born: January 23, 1895 Kansas City, Kansas
- Died: January 17, 1987 (aged 91) Kansas City, Kansas
- Party: Republican

Harry Darby (January 23, 1895 – January 17, 1987) was an American politician from Kansas.

== Life and career ==
Born in Kansas City, Kansas, Darby graduated from the University of Illinois, and served in the United States Army during the World War I, rising to the rank of captain. After the war he became successful in business ventures in several different fields including insurance, steel, railroads, utilities and banking. He served on the Kansas State Highway Commission from 1933 to 1937.

In 1938 Darby, the owner of Darby Steel Company, purchased Kaw Steel Construction Company, in the West Bottoms at Kansas City, Kansas and formed The Darby Corporation from the two companies. The plant built most of the landing craft tanks (LCTs) that were used in various amphibious invasions. The plant built one craft a day and floated them more than 1,000 miles down the Missouri and Mississippi Rivers to New Orleans, Louisiana, prompting their "Prairie Ships" nickname. Darby's plant at the mouth of Kansas River could hold 8 135í LCTs and 16 Landing Craft Mechanizeds (LCMs) in various stages of construction.

Darby served as the Republican National Committeeman for Kansas from the 1940 National Convention to early 1964, when he resigned the position. Gertrude Laughlin McSorley was his personal secretary during his career.

On December 2, 1949, he was appointed to fill a United States Senate seat to replace Clyde M. Reed (who had died on November 8) by Governor Frank Carlson, despite the fact that his only prior government experience was four years on the state highway commission. As a senator, Darby was a friend of General Dwight D. Eisenhower, a fellow Kansan. He kept his seat until November 28, 1950, when he was succeeded by Frank Carlson, the very man who had appointed him to the seat.

Darby returned to Kansas City and lived there until his death. He was buried in Highland Park Cemetery in Kansas City.

== Legacy ==
Interstate 635 (Kansas–Missouri) is named the Harry Darby Memorial Highway for him in both Kansas and Missouri.

The bronze statue of Dwight D. Eisenhower, by Robert L. Dean Jr., on the grounds of the Eisenhower Presidential Library and Museum in Abilene, Kansas is a gift of the Harry and Edith Darby Foundation.

U.S. Senate
Preceded by Clyde M. Reed	United States Senator (Class 3) from Kansas; 1949–1950	Succeeded by Frank Carlson
