= University of Akron School of Music =

Coordinates: 41°04′43.2″N 81°30′54.1″W

The University of Akron: School of Music
- Motto: Fiat Lux (Latin)
- Motto in English: Let there be light
- Director: Dr. Marc Reed
- Academic staff: 46
- Students: ~250
- Location: Akron, Ohio, United States
- Campus: Urban, 218 acres (0.88 km^{2})

The University of Akron: School of Music is an academic program for music content at the University of Akron. Some groups that perform there are: The Wind Symphony, The Symphony Band, and more.

== Performing groups ==
- The Wind Symphony
- The Symphony Band
- Concert Band
- Marching Band "Ohio's Pride" ~250 members
- Pep Band "Blue and Gold"
- Steel Drum Band
- The Akron New Music Ensemble
- Jazz Combo(s) and Ensemble(s)
- Symphony Orchestra
- Concert Choir
- Chamber Choir
- Chamber ensembles

Ensembles are open to music majors and non-majors.

== Facilities ==
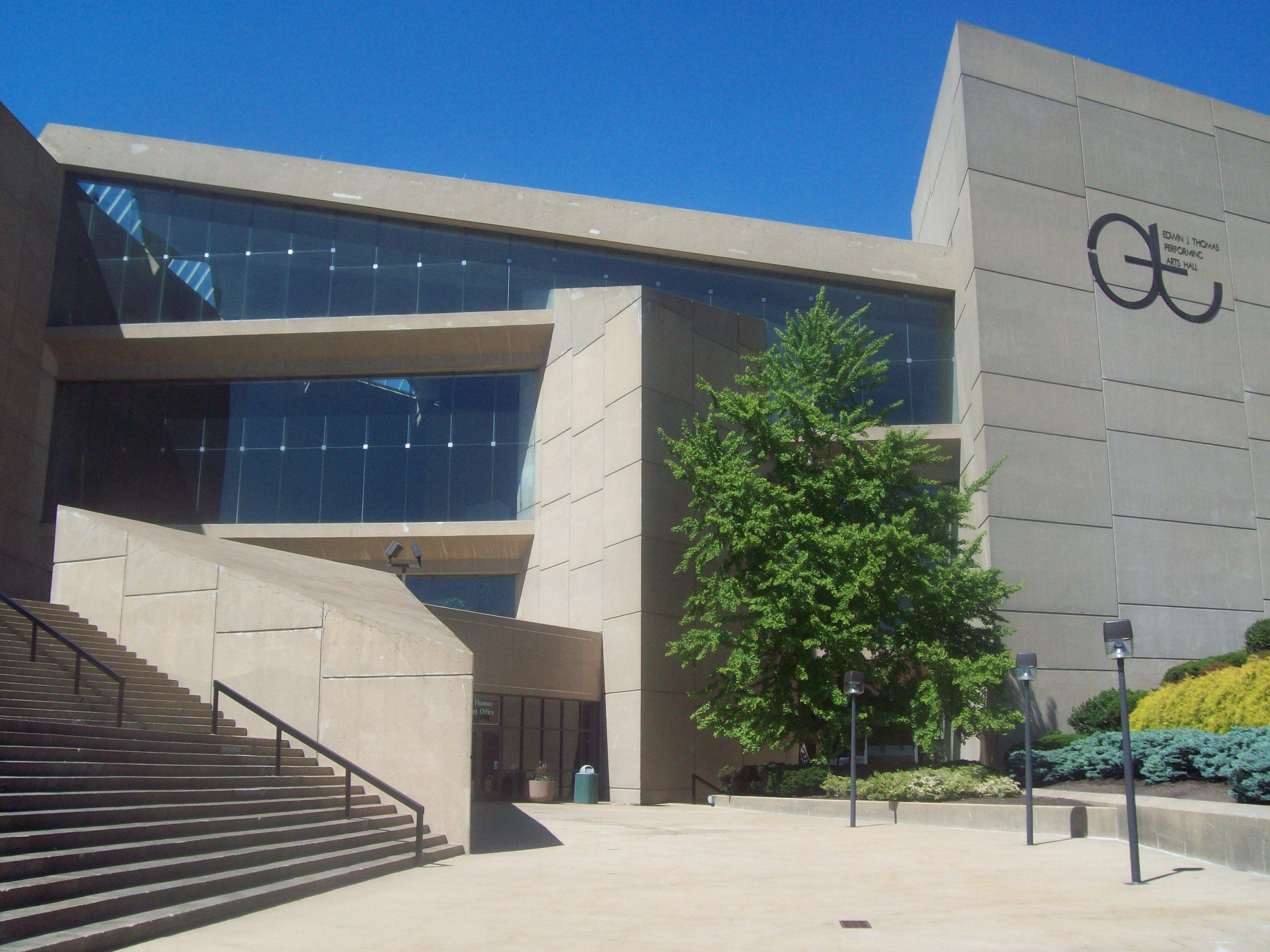
E.J. Thomas Hall on The University of Akron campus

Facilities include a 250-seat recital hall, the 2,895-seat Edwin J. Thomas Performing Arts Hall, a music computer center, a music resource center, and an electronic music composition laboratory. Guzzetta Hall, home of the School of Music, combines with the Edwin J. Thomas Performing Arts Hall to form a center for the performing arts. The Nola Guzzetta Recital Hall is equipped with a manual Moeller pipe organ, a Martin harpsichord, and two Steinway concert grand pianos.

=== Notable alumni ===
- Mark Scatterday - director of the Eastman Wind Ensemble
- Daniel W. McCarthy - Composer and Co-Author
