= Phillipsburg, Kansas =

City in Phillips County, Kansas

- City and County seat
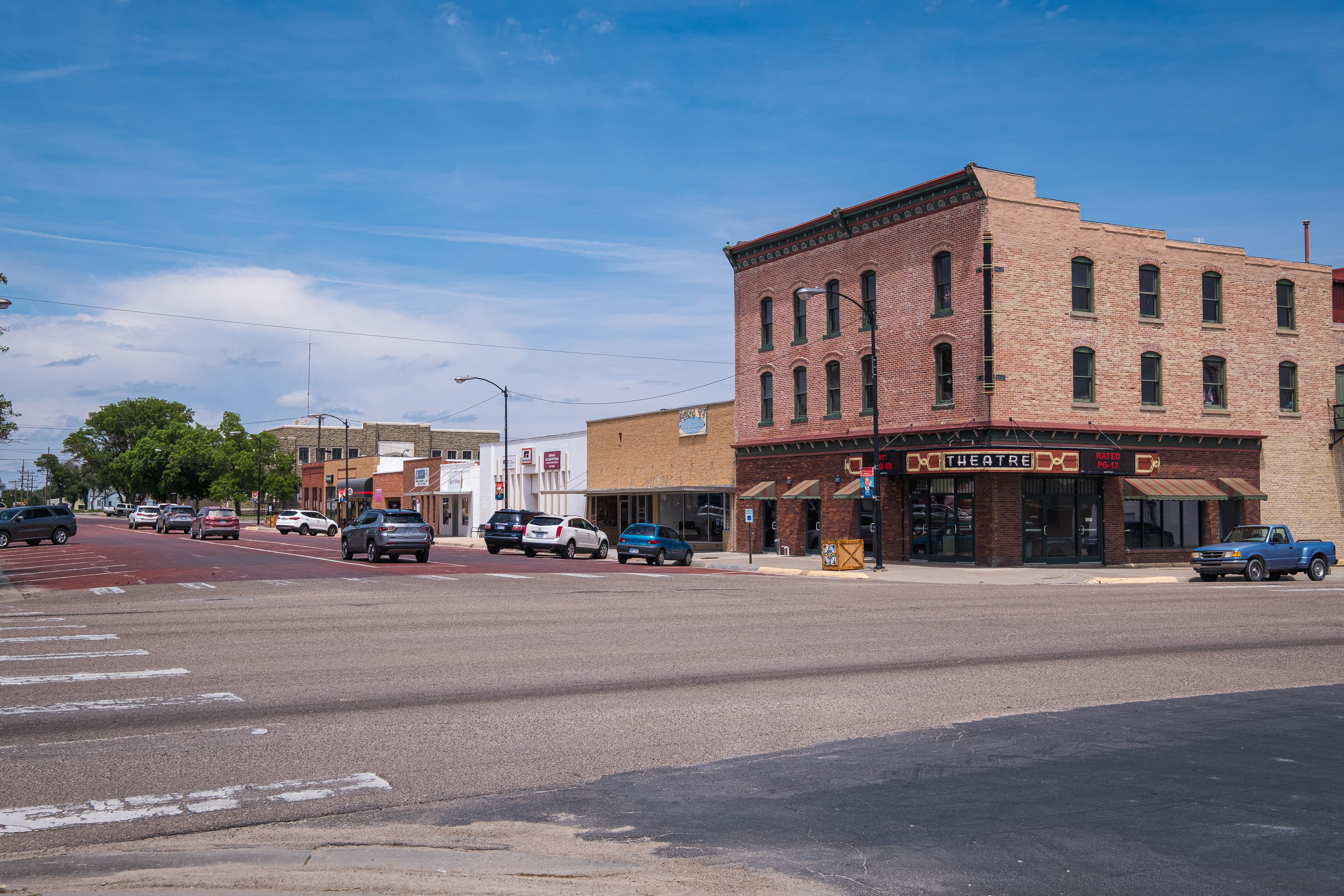
- Phillipsburg in 2021

- Location within Phillips County and Kansas

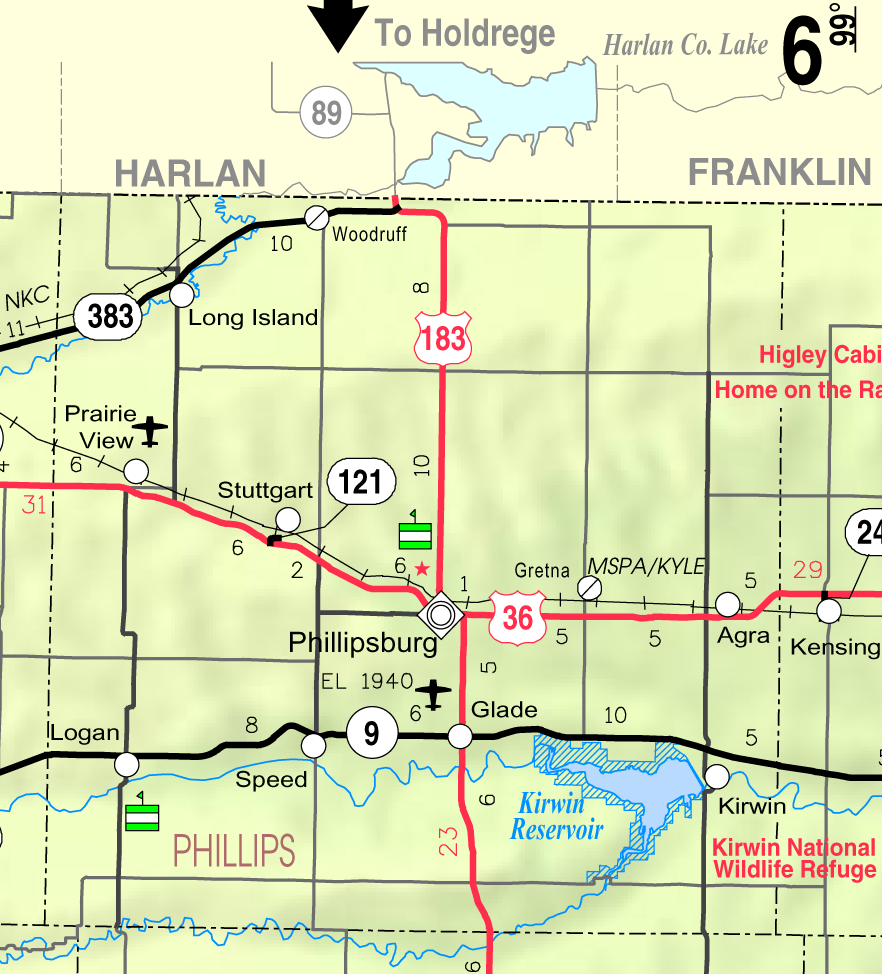
- KDOT map of Phillips County (legend)
- Coordinates: 39°45′04″N 99°19′10″W
- Country: United States
- State: Kansas
- County: Phillips
- Founded: 1872
- Incorporated: 1872
- Named for: William Phillips

Area
  - Total: 1.69 sq mi (4.39 km^{2})
  - Land: 1.69 sq mi (4.39 km^{2})
  - Water: 0 sq mi (0.00 km^{2})
- Elevation: 1,929 ft (588 m)

Population (2020)
  - Total: 2,337
  - Density: 1,380/sq mi (532/km^{2})
- Time zone: UTC-6 (CST)
  - Summer (DST): UTC-5 (CDT)
- ZIP Code: 67661
- Area code: 785
- FIPS code: 20-55675
- GNIS ID: 485642
- Website: cityofphillipsburg.com

Phillipsburg is a city in and the county seat of Phillips County, Kansas, United States. As of the 2020 census, its population was 2,337.

== History ==
Phillipsburg was organized in 1872 and named the county seat due to its central location in the county on July 26, though the first residents did not arrive until late that year. It was named for politician and journalist William A. Phillips. Phillipsburg was incorporated as a city in 1880.

The first post office was established in Phillipsburg on December 23, 1872, with the first postmaster being Fred A Dutton, but the name of the post office was spelled Phillipsburgh until 1893. Named in honor of John Bissel, Fort Bissel was built in 1872 to protect against perceived hostility from Native Americans and closed in 1878. The Fort was reconstructed in city park in 1962. The first cemetery in the town, Close cemetery, was established on March 19, 1879 by the Fairview cemetery association and was deeded to the city on June 4, 1889. A branch of the Chicago, Kansas and Nebraska Railway was established through Phillipsburg in 1887. Also in 1887 complete telephone systems were installed in the city. A fire nearly destroyed the entire town square in 1906. The current courthouse was constructed in 1912. "Kansas' Biggest Rodeo" was first held in 1929 and is held annually on the last weekend in July or first weekend in August.

In 1939, Consumer's Cooperative Association opened the world's first cooperative oil refinery on the northern edge of town, and shutdown in 1992.

== Geography ==
Phillipsburg is located in northwestern Kansas on the western edge of the Smoky Hills region of the Great Plains. Phillipsburg is located in the middle of Phillips County, approximately 20 miles south of the Nebraska border. The city sits on the north side of Deer Creek, a tributary of the North Fork of the Solomon River. Plotner Creek, a tributary of Deer Creek, flows south along the western edge of the city. According to the United States Census Bureau, the city has a total area of 1.67 square miles (4.33 km^{2}), all land.

=== Climate ===
Phillipsburg's climate is either classified as a humid subtropical climate (Köppen Cfa bordering on Cwa), using the −3 °C (26.6 °F) isotherm of the original Köppen scheme, or a humid continental climate (Köppen Dfa bordering on Dwa), using the 0 °C (32 °F) isotherm preferred by some climatologists. Phillipsburg meets the criteria for a true winter dry season under the Köppen climate classification, which is a rarity for its region and for the United States as a whole outside of South Florida. On average, January is the coolest month, July is the warmest month, and May is the wettest month.

Climate data for Phillipsburg, Kansas, 1991–2020 normals, extremes 1893–present
Month	Jan	Feb	Mar	Apr	May	Jun	Jul	Aug	Sep	Oct	Nov	Dec	Year
Record high °F (°C)	79 (26)	86 (30)	101 (38)	102 (39)	106 (41)	114 (46)	120 (49)	117 (47)	111 (44)	100 (38)	88 (31)	83 (28)	120 (49)
Mean maximum °F (°C)	63.3 (17.4)	69.3 (20.7)	78.2 (25.7)	88.1 (31.2)	94.3 (34.6)	101.2 (38.4)	105.3 (40.7)	103.5 (39.7)	97.8 (36.6)	90.2 (32.3)	75.8 (24.3)	64.1 (17.8)	107.7 (42.1)
Mean daily maximum °F (°C)	39.8 (4.3)	43.5 (6.4)	55.7 (13.2)	65.2 (18.4)	75.3 (24.1)	87.3 (30.7)	92.5 (33.6)	90.2 (32.3)	81.9 (27.7)	68.0 (20.0)	53.9 (12.2)	41.8 (5.4)	66.3 (19.1)
Daily mean °F (°C)	28.1 (−2.2)	31.3 (−0.4)	41.9 (5.5)	51.1 (10.6)	62.2 (16.8)	74.0 (23.3)	79.3 (26.3)	77.1 (25.1)	68.0 (20.0)	54.2 (12.3)	40.8 (4.9)	30.0 (−1.1)	53.2 (11.8)
Mean daily minimum °F (°C)	16.3 (−8.7)	19.1 (−7.2)	28.1 (−2.2)	37.0 (2.8)	49.1 (9.5)	60.7 (15.9)	66.0 (18.9)	64.0 (17.8)	54.1 (12.3)	40.4 (4.7)	27.8 (−2.3)	18.2 (−7.7)	40.1 (4.5)
Mean minimum °F (°C)	−1.6 (−18.7)	2.7 (−16.3)	11.8 (−11.2)	23.4 (−4.8)	34.6 (1.4)	47.9 (8.8)	55.9 (13.3)	54.3 (12.4)	39.3 (4.1)	23.2 (−4.9)	11.2 (−11.6)	3.1 (−16.1)	−6.1 (−21.2)
Record low °F (°C)	−22 (−30)	−22 (−30)	−16 (−27)	7 (−14)	21 (−6)	37 (3)	42 (6)	40 (4)	25 (−4)	1 (−17)	−8 (−22)	−28 (−33)	−28 (−33)
Average precipitation inches (mm)	0.49 (12)	0.86 (22)	1.52 (39)	2.44 (62)	4.34 (110)	3.02 (77)	4.04 (103)	3.13 (80)	1.69 (43)	2.09 (53)	1.08 (27)	0.93 (24)	25.63 (651)
Average snowfall inches (cm)	3.4 (8.6)	6.6 (17)	1.5 (3.8)	0.5 (1.3)	0.0 (0.0)	0.0 (0.0)	0.0 (0.0)	0.0 (0.0)	0.0 (0.0)	0.7 (1.8)	1.1 (2.8)	3.2 (8.1)	17.0 (43)
Average precipitation days (≥ 0.01 in)	3.1	3.6	5.2	7.3	9.4	8.8	7.6	7.3	5.0	5.8	3.6	3.5	70.2
Average snowy days (≥ 0.1 in)	2.0	2.6	0.8	0.3	0.0	0.0	0.0	0.0	0.0	0.2	0.7	2.1	8.7
Source 1: NOAA
Source 2: XMACIS2

== Demographics ==
Historical population
Census	Pop.	Note	%±
1880	309		—
1890	992		221.0%
1900	1,008		1.6%
1910	1,302		29.2%
1920	1,310		0.6%
1930	1,543		17.8%
1940	2,109		36.7%
1950	2,589		22.8%
1960	3,233		24.9%
1970	3,241		0.2%
1980	3,229		−0.4%
1990	2,828		−12.4%
2000	2,668		−5.7%
2010	2,581		−3.3%
2020	2,337		−9.5%
U.S. Decennial Census

=== 2020 census ===
As of the 2020 census, Phillipsburg had a population of 2,337, including 1,040 households and 601 families. The median age was 43.0 years. 23.8% of residents were under the age of 18, 5.7% were from 18 to 24, 22.2% were from 25 to 44, 23.7% were from 45 to 64, and 24.5% were 65 years of age or older. For every 100 females there were 100.1 males, and for every 100 females age 18 and over there were 93.5 males age 18 and over.

The population density was 1,377.9 per square mile (532.0/km^{2}). There were 1,269 housing units at an average density of 748.2 per square mile (288.9/km^{2}), of which 18.0% were vacant. The homeowner vacancy rate was 3.6% and the rental vacancy rate was 14.8%.

0.0% of residents lived in urban areas, while 100.0% lived in rural areas.

Of the 1,040 households, 26.0% had children under the age of 18 living in them. Of all households, 44.9% were married-couple households, 22.4% were households with a male householder and no spouse or partner present, and 27.7% were households with a female householder and no spouse or partner present. About 38.4% of all households were made up of individuals and 19.0% had someone living alone who was 65 years of age or older.

Racial composition as of the 2020 census
Race	Number	Percent
White	2,184	93.5%
Black or African American	15	0.6%
American Indian and Alaska Native	8	0.3%
Asian	12	0.5%
Native Hawaiian and Other Pacific Islander	1	0.0%
Some other race	12	0.5%
Two or more races	105	4.5%
Hispanic or Latino (of any race)	66	2.8%

=== Demographic estimates ===
The average household size was 2.0 and the average family size was 2.9. The percent of those with a bachelor's degree or higher was estimated to be 15.9% of the population.

=== Income and poverty ===
The 2016–2020 5-year American Community Survey estimates show that the median household income was $48,241 (with a margin of error of +/- $9,352) and the median family income was $65,313 (+/- $5,414). Males had a median income of $37,833 (+/- $6,895) versus $27,393 (+/- $7,192) for females. The median income for those above 16 years old was $34,826 (+/- $5,776). Approximately, 10.4% of families and 13.1% of the population were below the poverty line, including 30.4% of those under the age of 18 and 5.0% of those ages 65 or over.

=== 2010 census ===
As of the census of 2010, there were 2,581 people, 1,116 households, and 702 families residing in the city. The population density was 1,545.5 inhabitants per square mile (596.7/km^{2}). There were 1,307 housing units at an average density of 782.6 per square mile (302.2/km^{2}). The racial makeup of the city was 96.7% White, 0.5% African American, 0.2% Native American, 1.1% Asian, 0.4% from other races, and 1.1% from two or more races. Hispanic or Latino of any race were 2.6% of the population.

There were 1,116 households, of which 28.0% had children under the age of 18 living with them, 48.9% were married couples living together, 9.4% had a female householder with no husband present, 4.6% had a male householder with no wife present, and 37.1% were non-families. 34.0% of all households were made up of individuals, and 16.9% had someone living alone who was 65 years of age or older. The average household size was 2.25 and the average family size was 2.86.

The median age in the city was 43 years. 24.7% of residents were under the age of 18; 6.4% were between the ages of 18 and 24; 21.2% were from 25 to 44; 26.1% were from 45 to 64; and 21.7% were 65 years of age or older. The gender makeup of the city was 48.0% male and 52.0% female.

== Economy ==
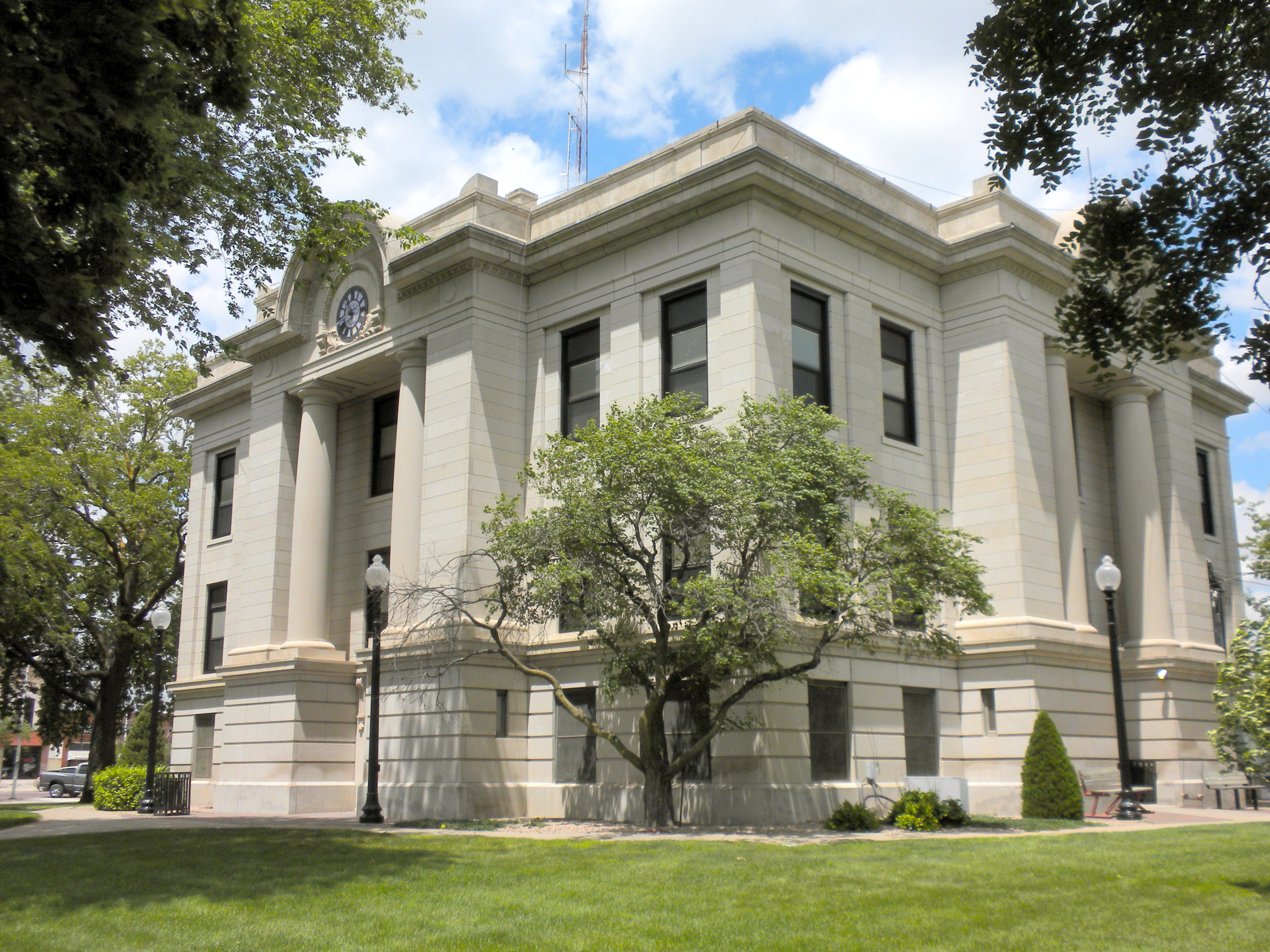
Phillips County Courthouse (2010)

In 1939, a small oil refinery was built on the north side of Phillipsburg, and was the first cooperative refinery in the United States. Later it closed, then eventually demolished in 2012 and 2013.

In 1969, TAMKO Building Products roofing shingle plant was constructed on the north side of Phillipsburg, and is now the largest manufacturer in the city.

In 2006, Amber Wave ethanol plant was built at the east side of Phillipsburg.

== Education ==
The community is served by Phillipsburg USD 325 public school district.

The Phillipsburg Panthers have won the following Kansas State High School championships:

- 2014 Boys Track & Field - Class 3A
- 2015 Football - Class 2-1A
- 2018 Football - Class 2A

== Culture ==
The Riverless Festival is held in June and is a take on other communities that have river or lake festivals. Since Phillipsburg is a dry climate area, the city celebrates its lack of rivers in a tongue-in-cheek way through its annual Riverless Festival. The courthouse square hosts craft booths, food stands line the roads, and children line up for the games and rides, which are sponsored by local area businesses.

The rodeo is promoted as the biggest in Kansas. Phillipsburg hosts the rodeo each year, typically during the first week of August.

== Notable people ==
Notable individuals who were born in or have lived in Phillipsburg include:

- McDill "Huck" Boyd, newspaper editor, Kansas politician
- Nelson B. McCormick, U.S. Representative from Kansas
- Wallace Pratt, geologist
- Mark Simoneau, former National Football League linebacker
