= Dan McCarthy (JAG) =

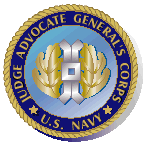
- Military career
- Allegiance: United States of America
- Branch: Judge Advocate General's Corps, U.S. Navy
- Rank: Captain; Chief Prosecutor of the Judge Advocate General's Corps at the Guantanamo Bay detention camp

Dan McCarthy is a captain in the United States Navy and one of around 730 lawyers who are members of the Judge Advocate General's Corps of the United States Navy. He was educated at the Duke University School of Law. McCarthy has been involved with the military commissions at Guantanamo Bay detention camp where over 250 suspected Enemy combatants and terrorists are being held to await trial.

He is chief prosecutor of the Judge Advocate General's Corps of the United States Navy at the Guantanamo Bay Naval Base. McCarthy is also the one who introduced Ex parte Quirin to Lieutenant Commander Charles Swift which would become bases for the military tribunals at the Guantanamo Bay detention camp. While Lieutenant Commander Charles Swift was at the base McCarthy was his supervisor and close friend.

== See also ==
- Judge Advocate General's Corps of the United States Navy
- Guantanamo Bay detention camp
- Guantanamo Bay Naval Base
- Charles Swift
