= Daniel M. McCarthy =

American politician and lawyer (1888–1950)

Member of the Kansas Senate
- In office 1933–1935

Personal details
- Born: 1888 Mankato, Kansas, U.S.
- Died: August 22, 1950 (aged 61–62)
- Party: Democratic
- Spouse: Kathryn O'Loughlin
- Occupation: Politician, lawyer

Daniel M. McCarthy (1888 – August 22, 1950) was an American Democratic politician and lawyer.

Born in Mankato, Kansas, McCarthy was a lawyer. He served in the Kansas State Senate in 1933 and 1935. He married Kathyrn O'Loughlin, who served in the United States House of Representatives.
