= K-128 (Kansas highway) =

State highway in Kansas, U.S.

K-128
- K-128 highlighted in red

Route information
- Maintained by KDOT
- Length: 36.886 mi (59.362 km)
- Existed: January 7, 1937–present

Major junctions
- South end: US-24 / K-9 northwest of Glen Elder
- US-36 west of Mankato
- North end: N-78 at the Nebraska border near Burr Oak

Location
- Country: United States
- State: Kansas
- Counties: Mitchell, Jewell

Highway system
- Kansas State Highway System; Interstate; US; State; Spurs
← K-127	→ K-129

K-128 is a 36.9-mile-long (59.4 km) north–south state highway in the U.S. state of Kansas. K-128's southern terminus is at U.S. Route 24 (US-24) and K-9 northwest of Glen Elder, and the northern terminus continues as Nebraska Highway 78 (N-78) at the Nebraska border north of Burr Oak. West of Mankato, a small section of K-128 is co-designated as US-36.

Before state highways were numbered in Kansas, there were auto trails, which were an informal network of marked routes that existed in the United States and Canada in the early part of the 20th century. The section of K-128 that overlaps with US-36 was part of the Pikes Peak Ocean to Ocean Highway auto trail. K-128 was first designated on January 7, 1937, and ran from US-24 and K-9 north to US-36. In February 1996, K-28 was truncated to K-14 in Jewell, and the section of K-28 from US-36 to the Nebraska state line became an extension of K-128.

== Route description ==
K-128 begins at an intersection with K-9 and US-24 just north of Waconda Lake and northwest of Glen Elder in Mitchell County. It begins travelling northward for roughly 3.6 miles (5.8 km), through rural farmlands, before reaching the Jewell County line. After entering Jewell County it continues northward, following to the west of Limestone Creek, a tributary of the Solomon River. About 3.5 miles (5.6 km) past the county line, K-128 crosses West Limestone Creek, a tributary of Limestone Creek. The highway continues from here for about three miles (4.8 km), before it reaches the western terminus of K-228, which runs eastward to serve Ionia. From K-228, the highway continues northward until it reaches US-36.

At US-36, K-128 turns eastward and runs concurrent with US-36 for about two miles (3.2 km) then turns northward and leaves US-36, which continues east toward Mankato. It continues northward for roughly 5.2 miles (8.4 km), before reaching Burr Oak, where it becomes Main Street. As it continues north through the city it crosses White Rock Creek, a tributary of the Republican River, then exits the city. Just north of Burr Oak it crosses Walnut Creek then Wolf Creek, both tributaries of White Rock Creek. About 3.3 miles (5.3 km) later, K-128 intersects Cedar Road, also known as Rural Secondary 336 (RS-336). At Cedar Road, K-128 turns westward for one mile (1.6 km) before turning back north at Cedar Road (RS-335). From here, K-128 continues northward for two miles (3.2 km) before reaching N-78 at the Nebraska state line.

The Kansas Department of Transportation (KDOT) tracks the traffic levels on its highways, and in 2017, they determined that on average the traffic varied from 295 vehicles per day slightly north of Burr Oak to 1410 vehicles per day along the concurrency with US-36. The only section of K-128 that is included in the National Highway System is its concurrency with US-36. The National Highway System is a system of highways important to the nation's defense, economy, and mobility. K-128 also connects to the National Highway System at its junction with US-24.

== History ==
=== Early roads ===
Before state highways were numbered in Kansas there were auto trails, which were an informal network of marked routes that existed in the United States and Canada in the early part of the 20th century. The section of K-128 that overlaps with US-36 was part of the Pikes Peak Ocean to Ocean Highway. The southern terminus was part of the Roosevelt National Highway, Kansas White Way, and Sunflower Trail.

=== Establishment and realignments ===
K-128 was assigned by the State Highway Commission of Kansas on January 7, 1937, and ran from US-24 and K-9 north to US-36. K-128 originally ran directly north–south through Ionia until it was moved slightly westward to a new alignment in 1945, and at that time K-228 was created to link Ionia to the new alignment. The United States Bureau of Reclamation began purchasing rights-of-way in June 1963, and then started constructing the Glen Elder Dam and Waconda Lake in November 1964. Then in 1965, US-24 was realigned slightly north to a new alignment and K-128 was shortened by 0.457 miles (0.735 km) to meet the new alignment of US-24 and K-9 to make way for the new lake. On February 8, 1996, K-28 was truncated to K-14 in Jewell and the section of K-28 from US-36 to the Nebraska state line became an extension of K-128, which created a short overlap with US-36.

== Major intersections ==
County	Location	mi	km	Destinations	Notes
Mitchell	Glen Elder Township	0.000	0.000	US-24 / K-9 – Beloit, Osborne	Southern terminus
Jewell	Ionia Township	10.328	16.621	K-228 east – Ionia	Western terminus of K-228
Jewell	Limestone Township	18.967	30.524	US-36 west – Smith Center	Southern terminus of US-36 concurrency
Jewell	Limestone Township	20.964	33.738	US-36 east – Mankato	Northern terminus of US-36 concurrency
Jewell	Walnut Township	36.886	59.362	N-78 north – Guide Rock	Continuation at the Nebraska border
1.000 mi = 1.609 km; 1.000 km = 0.621 mi: Concurrency terminus
