= K-28 (Kansas highway) =

State highway in Kansas, U.S.

K-28
- K-28 highlighted in red

Route information
- Maintained by KDOT
- Length: 29.019 mi (46.702 km)
- Existed: 1927–present

Major junctions
- West end: K-14 in Jewell
- East end: K-9 west of Concordia

Location
- Country: United States
- State: Kansas
- Counties: Jewell, Cloud

Highway system
- Kansas State Highway System; Interstate; US; State; Spurs
← K-27	→ K-29

K-28 is a 29.019-mile-long (46.702 km) state highway in the U.S. state of Kansas. K-28's western terminus is at K-14 in Jewell, and the eastern terminus is at K-9 west of Concordia. K-28 passes through the cities of Randall and Jamestown as well as the ghost town of Yuma. The highway also passes within one mile (1.6 km) of the Jamestown Wildlife Area, a popular hunting and fishing destination. The highway is a two-lane paved road its entire length.

Before state highways were numbered in Kansas there were auto trails, the road that K-28 follows crosses the former Sunflower Trail at Randall. It also follows the former Kansas White Way from Jamestown to its eastern terminus. K-28 originally terminated at Nebraska Highway 78 (N-78) at the Nebraska border north of Burr Oak but was truncated to its current western terminus on February 8, 1996. K-28 originally overlapped K-9 to end at US-81 in Concordia but was truncated to its current eastern terminus on April 10, 2010.

== Route description ==
K-28 begins at K-14 in Jewell and runs east to K-9 west of Concordia. The highway is signed as east–west and is a two-lane road its entire length. The Kansas Department of Transportation (KDOT) tracks the traffic levels on its highways, and in 2017, they determined that on average the traffic varied from 195 vehicles per day slightly northwest of Jamestown to 990 vehicles per day near its eastern terminus. K-28 is not included in the National Highway System. The National Highway System is a system of highways important to the nation's defense, economy, and mobility.

=== Jewell County ===
K-28 begins at K-14 (Columbus Street) in the city of Jewell in south central Jewell County. K-14 heads north toward Mankato and south toward Beloit. K-28 heads east along Delaware Street and crosses Buffalo Creek, a tributary of the Republican River, east of the city limits. The highway passes to the north of Wallace Cemetery and then crosses Spring Creek. It continues east for 2.8 miles (4.5 km) then reaches a junction with K-148, which heads east through the southern tier of Republic County. K-28 turns south and enters the city of Randall about 1.5 miles (2.4 km) later. The highway enters the city along Main Street, turns east onto 2nd Street, south onto Water Street, and east again at the south city limit. K-28 continues east, as it parallels Buffalo Creek. The highway then crosses Dry Creek, then crosses into northwestern Cloud County, .6 miles (0.97 km) later.

=== Cloud County ===
The highway enters the county as Wagon Road and after one mile (1.6 km) curves south and begins to follow 10th Road, southwest of Jamestown Wildlife Area. It continues south for one mile (1.6 km) then curves back east at Vale Road, which it begins to follow. It continues east for one mile (1.6 km) through flat rural farmlands then curves south and begins to follow 20th Road. K-28 crosses to the south side of Buffalo Creek, then the highway curves southeast toward Jamestown. The highway crosses Cheyenne Creek and passes very close to but does not enter the Jamestown city limits. East of Jamestown, K-28 has a grade crossing of a Kyle Railroad line and crosses Whites Creek. It then passes Fairview Cemetery as it enters the unincorporated village of Yuma. East of Yuma, the highway closely parallels the Kyle line and a BNSF Railway line that comes to parallel the Kyle line. Here the highway curves southeast as it continues paralleling the railways. After about two miles (3.2 km) it curves south away from the rail lines, crosses Wolf Creek, then reaches its eastern terminus at a Y-intersection with K-9 west of Concordia, the county seat of Cloud County. K-9 heads east into Concordia and southwest toward Beloit.

== History ==
=== Early roads ===
Before state highways were numbered in Kansas there were Auto trails, which were an informal network of marked routes that existed in the United States and Canada in the early part of the 20th century. The former Sunflower Trail crosses K-28 at Randall. The highway closely follows the former Kansas White Way from Jamestown to its eastern terminus. When K-28 terminated in Concordia, the highway intersected the Meridian Highway. When K-28 overlapped US-36, it overlapped the former Pikes Peak Ocean to Ocean Highway.

=== Establishment and realignments ===
K-28 is one of the original Kansas highways designated in 1927, and at that time ran from K-14 in Jewell east to US-81 in Concordia. Then by 1931, it was extended north along K-14 then west along US-36 through Mankato, then north through Bur Oak to the Nebraska border. In a February 10, 1937 resolution, K-28 and K-9 was realigned slightly within Concordia to eliminate two turns. In a March 24, 1954 resolution, it was realigned to the north side of Jamestown, which eliminated a few turns within the city. Until 1996, K-28 terminated at Nebraska Highway 78 (N-78) at the Nebraska border north of Burr Oak. Then on February 8, 1996, K-28 was truncated to K-14 in Jewell and the section of K-28 from US-36 north to the Nebraska border became an extension of K-128. Until 2010, K-28 overlapped K-9 to end at US-81 in Concordia. Then in an April 10, 2010 resolution, the overlap was eliminated and K-28 was truncated to end at K-9 west of Concordia.

== Junction list ==
County	Location	mi	km	Destinations	Notes
Jewell	Jewell	0.000	0.000	K-14 (Columbus Street) – Beloit, Mankato	Western terminus
Jewell	Buffalo–Vicksburg township line	6.100	9.817	K-148 east to US-81	Western terminus of K-148
Cloud	Lincoln Township	29.019	46.702	K-9 – Beloit, Concordia	Eastern terminus
1.000 mi = 1.609 km; 1.000 km = 0.621 mi
