= Limestone Creek (disambiguation) =

Limestone Creek is a tributary of the Tennessee River in Tennessee and Alabama.

Limestone Creek may also refer to:

== Streams ==
(alphabetical by state)

- Limestone Creek (Chattahoochee River tributary), in Georgia
- Limestone Creek (Ocmulgee River tributary), a tributary of the Ocmulgee River in Georgia
- Limestone Creek (Kansas), a tributary of the Little Osage River in Bourbon and Allen counties
- Limestone Creek (Solomon River tributary), in Kansas
- Limestone Creek (Miami Creek tributary), in Missouri
- Limestone Creek (Turnback Creek tributary), in Missouri
- Limestone Creek (Cowaselon Creek), site of Buttermilk Falls in Madison County, New York
- Limestone Creek (Chittenango Creek tributary), in New York

== Settlements ==
- Limestone Creek, Florida, a census-designated place in Palm Beach County
