= K-14 (Kansas highway) =

State highway in Kansas, U.S.

K-14
- K-14 highlighted in red, K-14 Truck highlighted in blue

Route information
- Maintained by KDOT and the cities of Kingman, Sterling, Lyons, Ellsworth and Beloit
- Length: 219.276 mi (352.891 km)
- Existed: 1926–present

Major junctions
- South end: US-160 / K-2 in Harper
- US-54 / US-400 through Kingman County; K-96 near South Hutchinson; US-50 / K-61 in South Hutchinson; US-56 / K-96 in Lyons; K-156 in Ellsworth; I-70 / US-40 through Ellsworth County; US-24 / K-9 in Beloit; US-36 in Mankato
- North end: N-14 at the Nebraska state line in Superior, NE

Location
- Country: United States
- State: Kansas
- Counties: Harper, Kingman, Reno, Rice, Ellsworth, Lincoln, Mitchell, Jewell

Highway system
- Kansas State Highway System; Interstate; US; State; Spurs
← K-13	→ K-15

K-14 is a 219.3-mile-long (352.9 km) north–south state highway which runs through the central part of the U.S. state of Kansas. K-14's southern terminus is at U.S. Highway 160 (US-160) and K-2 in the city of Harper, and the northern terminus is a continuation as Nebraska Highway 14 (N-14) at the Nebraska border by Superior, Nebraska. Along the way it intersects several major east–west highways in the larger cities it passes through, including US-54 and US-400 by Kingman; US-50, K-61 and K-96 by South Hutchinson; K-156 and K-140 by South Ellsworth; Interstate 70 (I-70) and US-40 north of Ellsworth; K-18 in Lincoln; US-24 and K-9 in Beloit; and US-36 east of Mankato. The northern and southern halves of the highway differ fairly significantly in terms of terrain and landscape. The southern half of K-14 travels over fairly flat terrain in the valley of the Arkansas River. Just north of the intersection with K-4 in southern Ellsworth County, K-14 passes into the Smoky Hills region, traveling over a series of broad, rolling hills, providing several scenic vistas of the surrounding countryside. The portion of the highway between Lincoln and Beloit is particularly hilly.

Before state highways were numbered in Kansas there were auto trails, which were an informal network of marked routes that existed in the United States and Canada in the early part of the 20th century. In the city of Kingman K-14 crosses the former Atlantic and Pacific Highway. By Hutchinson the highway crosses the former New Santa Fe Trail. Further north in Lyons, K-14 crosses the former National Old Trails Road and Old Santa Fe Trail. The highway crosses K-4, which closely follows the former Bee Line. In Ellsworth, the highway crosses the former Golden Belt. Further north in Lincoln, the highway intersects the former Blue Line. In Beloit, K-14 crosses the former Roosevelt National Highway, former Sunflower Trail, and former Kansas White Way. The section of K-14 that overlaps US-36 closely follows the Pikes Peak Ocean to Ocean Highway.

K-14 was first designated as a state highway in 1926, to a highway from K-44 in Anthony north through Kingman, Ellsworth, Beloit, and Mankato to the Nebraska border. By 1928, K-14 was realigned to follow US-36 east from Mankato then turn north toward Nebraska. By 1932, K-14 was extended west along the former K-44 to K-8 in Kiowa. By 1933, K-14 was extended west from Kiowa to Hardtner then south from there to the Oklahoma border, which created a short overlap with K-8. By 1939, K-8 was truncated to the west end of the overlap with K-14. Also at this time K-8 north of there became US-281, which also paralleled K-14 west from there through Hardtner to the Nebraska border. In 1994, K-14 was truncated to end at K-2 and US-160 in Harper, which eliminated the overlap with US-281, US-160, and K-2. In 2009, K-14 was rerouted along K-61 from Arlington to South Hutchinson then along K-96 from South Hutchinson through Nickerson to the former end of the K-14 and K-96 overlap west of Nickerson. In 2012, it was realigned further east between Kingman and South Hutchinson along former K-17.

== Route description ==
The Kansas Department of Transportation (KDOT) tracks the traffic levels on its highways, and in 2019, they determined that on average the traffic varied from 510 vehicles per day between US-36 and the Nebraska border to 13,400 vehicles per day along the overlap with I-70 and US-40. The second highest count was 10,100 vehicles per day in South Hutchinson just south of US-50. The sections of K-14 that overlaps US-54 and US-400 by Kingman, K-96 from South Hutchinson to Lyons, I-70 and US-40 north of Ellsworth, and US-36 east of Mankato is included in the National Highway System. The National Highway System is a system of highways important to the nation's defense, economy, and mobility. K-14 also connects to the National Highway System at its junctions with K-156 by Ellsworth, and US-24 and K-9 north of Beloit. The majority of K-14 is maintained by KDOT except for in a few cities. The entire section within the cities of Kingman, Sterling and Lyons are maintained by each city. The section of K-14 in Ellsworth from the south city limits to K-140, and the section in Beloit from the south city limits to K-9 and US-24 are maintained by each city.

=== Harper, Kingman and Reno counties ===
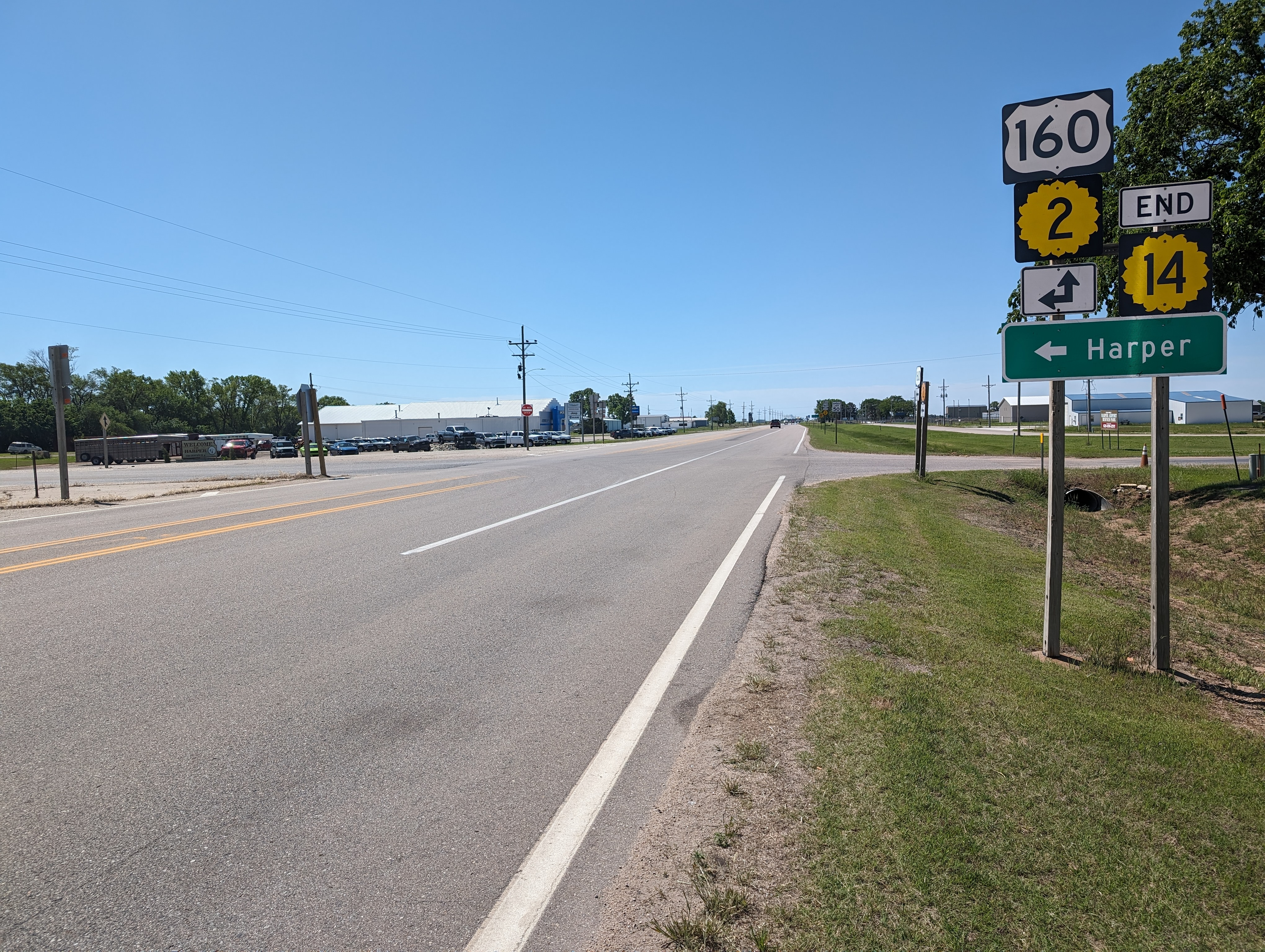
The southern terminus of K-14 at K-2 and US-160

K-14 begins on its southern end at US-160 and K-2 on the west side of the city of Harper in Harper County. The highway travels north past an electrical substation then reaches an at-grade crossing with a BNSF Railway track. K-14 continues north for roughly .6 miles (0.97 km) then crosses an abandoned railway before curving northwest. The highway continues northwest through flat rural farmlands for three miles (4.8 km) then curves more northward. After about 1.8 miles (2.9 km), K-14 intersects NW 150 Road then crosses Sand Creek. The highway continues northward for about one mile (1.6 km) where it enters into Kingman County by Duquoin.

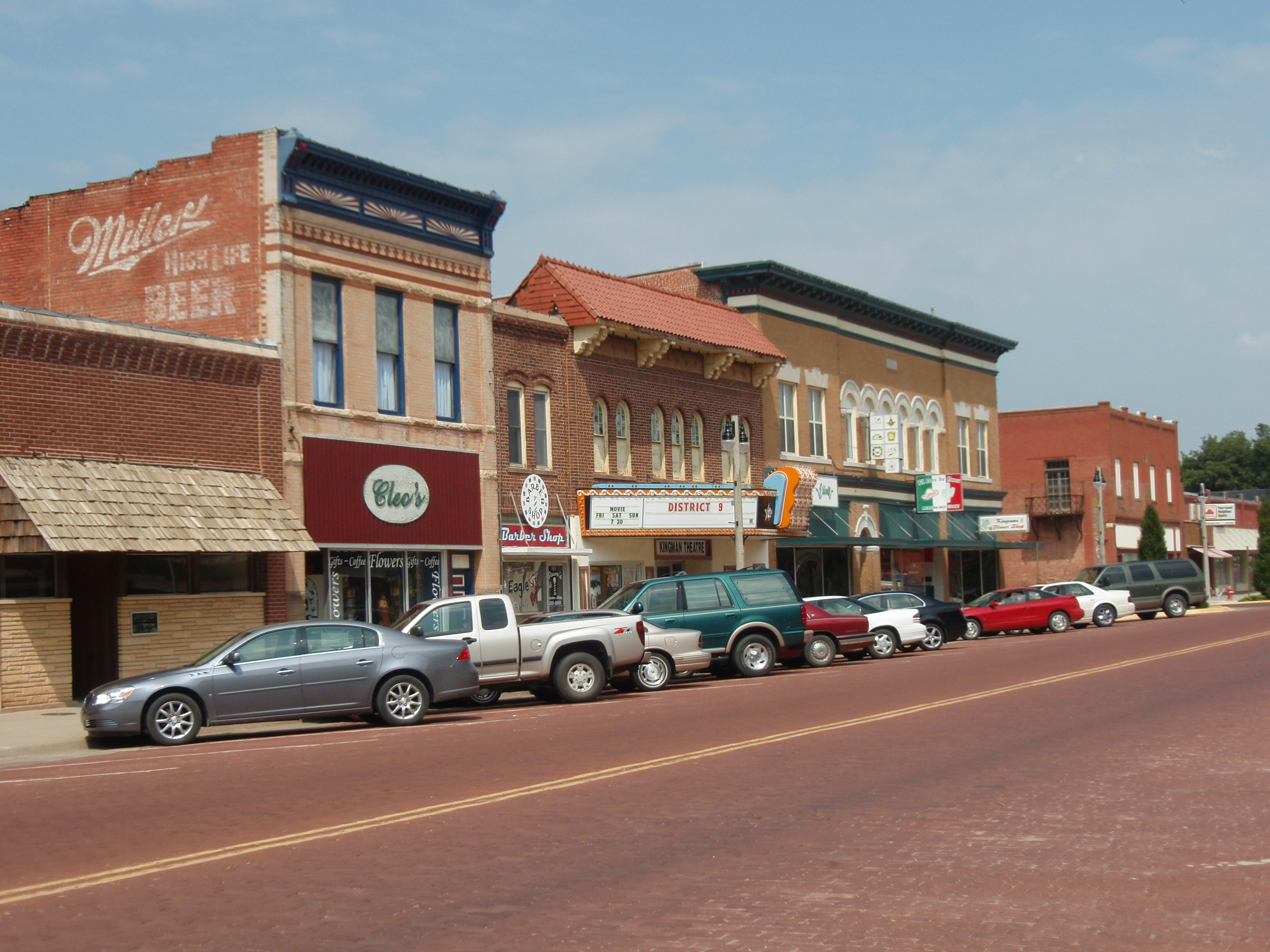
K-14 as it passes through Kingman

K-14 continues north into the county and transitions from flat farmlands to open rolling hills before curving due north. After 1.2 miles (1.9 km) the highway crosses the Chikaskia River then Red Creek soon after. The highway then passes the community of Rago where it intersects K-42. K-14 advances north for .7 miles (1.1 km) where it crosses Rose Bud Creek. The highway then crosses Rose Bud Creek again 1.1 miles (1.8 km) later. The highway continues along the creek for 4.3 miles (6.9 km) and intersects SE 70 Street, where it crosses a Kansas and Oklahoma Railway track. The roadway then crosses Sand Creek and curves northwest. It continues for 2.4 miles (3.9 km), crosses Hunter Creek, then curves north. The highway advances north for another approximately 2.4 miles (3.9 km) and enters the city of Kingman as Main Street. The highway soon crosses the Ninnescah River and has an at-grade crossing with a Kansas and Oklahoma Railway track. The highway continues north for .35 miles (0.56 km) then intersects US-54 and US-400 (D Avenue). K-14 turns east and begins to overlap US-54 and US-400 and after .7 miles (1.1 km) curves northeast. The roadway soon begins to pass Walnut Hill Cemetery and then exits the city about .4 miles (0.64 km) later. The highway continues northeast for 2.1 miles (3.4 km), then curves east and becomes a four-lane limited access highway. The highway soon reaches a partial cloverleaf interchange with 40th Avenue. The roadway continues through rural farmland for three miles (4.8 km) and reaches a diamond interchange with 70th Avenue. It continues another three miles (4.8 km) and reaches another diamond interchange, where K-14 leaves US-54 and US-400 and resumes a north course. K-14 continues north through flat rural farmlands for 4.5 miles (7.2 km) then enters into Reno County.

K-14 continues into the county for three miles (4.8 km) and intersects Pretty Prairie Road, which travels west to Pretty Prairie and east to Cheney State Park. K-14 continues north through flat rural farmlands for 4.65 miles (7.48 km) and crosses North Fork Ninnescah River, then shifts .2 miles (0.32 km) west. The roadway advances north through flat farmlands for 5.9 miles (9.5 km) and intersects Darlow Road by Darlow. The highway continues another 2.3 miles (3.7 km) and joins K-96 and begins to follow it north. K-14 and K-96 continue north as a four-lane divided highway for 2.3 miles (3.7 km) and enters South Hutchinson where they intersect US-50 and K-61 via a diamond interchange. K-14 and K-96 begin to follow US-50 and K-61 west and soon exits the city. The highway continues for one mile (1.6 km) west to a half-clover interchange, where K-14 and K-96 exit and turn north. K-14 and K-96 continue north as a super-two highway and soon crosses over a BNSF Railway track before curving north. The highway then reaches a diamond interchange with 6th Avenue. The highway then crosses over Salt Creek then the Arkansas River, before reaching a diamond interchange with 4th Avenue. K-14 and K-96 then cross over a Kansas and Oklahoma Railway track then curves northwest and reaches a diamond interchange with Wilson Road and Nickerson Boulevard. K-14 then transitions to a two-lane highway with at-grade intersections. The roadway continues through flat rural farmlands for about 3.75 miles (6.04 km) and then enters the city of Nickerson as Railroad Street. After about .35 miles (0.56 km) the highway turns southwest onto Nickerson Street and has an at-grade crossing with a Kansas and Oklahoma railway. K-14 continues on Nickerson Street for .3 miles (0.48 km) then turns northwest onto Avenue H. The highway then turns west onto 82nd Avenue and exits the city approximately .7 miles (1.1 km) later. The highway crosses the Arkansas River then passes through flat rural farmland for 3.65 miles (5.87 km) and intersects North Sego Road, which is the former routing of K-14 south. The highway continues west for 1.1 miles (1.8 km) then curves north and enters into Rice County .9 miles (1.4 km) later.

=== Rice and Ellsworth counties ===
K-14 and K-96 continue north into the county for .75 miles (1.21 km) then crosses the Arkansas River. The highway continues through flat rural farmlands for 1.6 miles (2.6 km) and crosses Bull Creek. The road then enters the city of Sterling as Broadway Avenue. The highway continues north through the city and soon has an at-grade crossing with a Kansas and Oklahoma Railway track. It continues for about .5 miles (0.80 km) then intersects Washington Avenue, which accesses the Hospital and High School. The highway then intersects Cleveland Avenue, which accesses Sterling College, then exits the city .6 miles (0.97 km) later. K-14 and K-96 continue north through flat rural farmland for 2.1 miles (3.4 km) then shifts .25 miles (0.40 km) to the east. The highway continues north for roughly 2.8 miles (4.5 km) and crosses Cow Creek, then Salt Creek .55 miles (0.89 km) later. The roadway advances north for another 1.25 miles (2.01 km) then enters the city of Lyons as Grand Avenue. K-14 and K-96 continues through the city for .8 miles (1.3 km) then crosses Salt Creek just north of Washington Street. The highways then intersect US-56 also known as Main Street. At this point K-96 splits from K-14 and continues west along US-56 toward Great Bend. K-14 continues north along Grand Avenue and after about .25 miles (0.40 km) crosses a Kansas and Oklahoma Railway track. The highway continues north for another .75 miles (1.21 km) and passes a cemetery as it exits the city. K-14 continues north through flat rural farmlands for six miles (9.7 km) and intersects Avenue F by Pollard. The highway continues north for about 4.55 miles (7.32 km) and intersects K-4. K-14 continues north for roughly .5 miles (0.80 km) then enters into Ellsworth County.

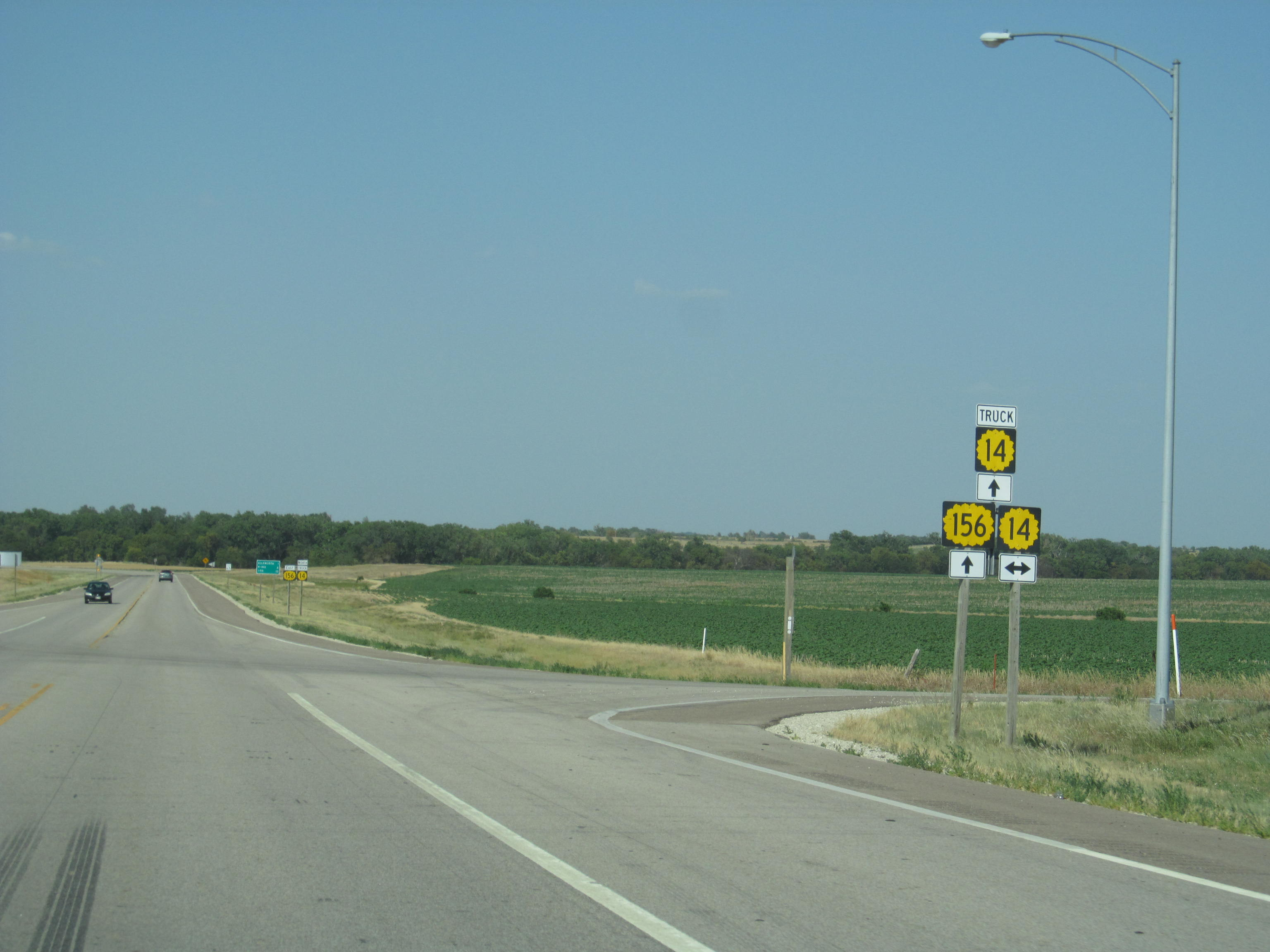
K-156 at junction with K-14 and K-14 Truck

As the highway enters the county it continues north through flat rural farmlands for roughly three miles (4.8 km) then becomes more hilly. K-14 continues for roughly three miles (4.8 km) then crosses Ash Creek, then an unnamed creek .9 miles (1.4 km) later. The highway proceeds for about 4.1 miles (6.6 km) then begins to flatten out and crosses Mud Creek. The roadway curves northwest and crosses Oxide Creek .9 miles (1.4 km) later. K-14 then reaches an intersection with K-156 and the southern terminus of K-14 Truck. K-14 Truck follows K-156 east and K-14 continues north for about one mile (1.6 km) then curves northeast and crosses the Smoky Hill River as it enters the historic city of Ellsworth as Douglas Avenue. After about .75 miles (1.21 km) it curves north and intersects the western terminus of K-140 and the northern terminus of K-14 Truck at 15th Street. K-14 then exits the city and passes to the east of the Ellsworth Municipal Airport. The highway continues north through flat rural farmlands and soon crosses West Oak Creek. K-14 continues north and crosses Oak Creek, which the highway begins to follow. It continues north for about four miles (6.4 km), crossing Oak Creek several more times, before reaching a diamond interchange with Interstate 70 (I-70) and US-40 at exit 219. K-14 joins I-70 and US-40 and begins to follow the interstate east. After roughly 2.9 miles (4.7 km) it exits I-70 and US-40 at exit 221 via another diamond interchange. K-14 resumes travelling north and after approximately 1.5 miles (2.4 km) enters into Lincoln County.

=== Lincoln, Mitchell and Jewell counties ===
The highway continues north into the county and begins to pass through the Smoky Hills Wind Farm and parallel West Elkhorn Creek. K-14 soon reaches a junction with East Elk Drive and curves east along it. After one mile (1.6 km) the highway curves back north, as East Elk Drive continues east. K-14 continues north through flat to slightly hilly farmlands for 5.3 miles (8.5 km) and crosses Bullfoot Creek. The highway continues approximately 1.4 miles (2.3 km) and crosses the Saline River and a Kansas and Oklahoma Railway track. The highway then enters the city of Lincoln as 6th Street. The roadway advances north for .9 miles (1.4 km) and intersects North Street, which accesses the hospital. The roadway continues approximately .5 miles (0.80 km) and intersects K-18, where it exits the city. K-14 continues north for 5.35 miles (8.61 km) through rolling hills with some farmlands, then shifts .2 miles (0.32 km) to the west. The highway continues north for about 1.35 miles (2.17 km) and crosses Battle Creek. K-14 proceeds north through rolling hills for about 2.4 miles (3.9 km) then intersects the western terminus of K-284, which travels east to Barnard. K-14 continues north for roughly one mile (1.6 km), crosses Rattlesnake Creek, then enters into Mitchell County one mile (1.6 km) later.

The highway continues into county for .85 miles (1.37 km) then curves northeast. It proceeds through rolling hills for 1.5 miles (2.4 km) then crosses Salt Creek. The landscape briefly transitions to flat rural farmlands and then soon curves back north. K-14 continues north through rolling open hills for approximately four miles (6.4 km) then transitions back to flat farmlands. The highway continues north for 8.2 miles (13.2 km) then crosses Leban Creek and curves northeast. The roadway then enters the city of Beloit as Hershey Avenue. K-14 soon crosses the Solomon River and has an at-grade crossing with a Union Pacific Railway track. The roadway continues for roughly .7 miles (1.1 km) then turns west and begins to follow 8th Street. K-14 continues for .25 miles (0.40 km), passes south of Mitchell County Community Hospital, then turns north at Independence Avenue. The highway continues north for one mile (1.6 km) and intersects US-24 and K-9 then exits the city. K-14 continues north through flat rural farmland for 5.6 miles (9.0 km) then curves west at and begins to follow the Mitchell–Jewell county line. After roughly 1.8 miles (2.9 km) the highway crosses Mulberry Creek and curves north into Jewell County.

K-14 continues north into the county and soon crosses Mulberry Creek again. The highway continues north through flat farmlands for five miles (8.0 km) then crosses Dry Creek. The roadway soon crosses West Buffalo Creek then enters the city of Jewell as Columbus Street. The highway soon intersects the western terminus of K-28, also known as Delaware Street. K-14 continues north for about one mile (1.6 km) and exits the city. The highway continues north and after about .65 miles (1.05 km) crosses Little Buffalo Creek. The roadway advances north through flat rural farmlands for 3.3 miles (5.3 km) then curves slightly northwest, then back north 1.75 miles (2.82 km) later. The highway continues another 1.65 miles (2.66 km) then intersects US-36 just east of Mankato. K-14 turns east and begins to overlap US-36 and after about 1.5 miles (2.4 km) crosses East Buffalo Creek. The highway continues for one mile (1.6 km), before splitting off and resuming a northerly course. K-14 continues north for about .7 miles (1.1 km) and crosses over a Kyle Railroad track. The highway continues through rolling hills for about 7.5 miles (12.1 km) before passing over White Rock Creek at the far western end of Lovewell Reservoir. The roadway advances north for about 2.15 miles (3.46 km) where it crosses Montana Creek. The highway continues for approximately 2.8 miles (4.5 km) then curves northeast. K-14 then crosses Courtland Canal 1.3 miles (2.1 km) later, then enters Nebraska near the city of Superior, Nebraska, where the highway continues as Nebraska Highway 14 (N-14).

== History ==
=== Early roads ===
Before state highways were numbered in Kansas there were auto trails, which were an informal network of marked routes that existed in the United States and Canada in the early part of the 20th century. In the city of Kingman K-14 crosses the former Atlantic and Pacific Highway, which connected New York City on the Atlantic Ocean with Los Angeles on the Pacific Ocean. By Hutchinson the highway crosses the former New Santa Fe Trail, which ran from Kansas City to Los Angeles. Further north in Lyons, K-14 crosses the former National Old Trails Road and Old Santa Fe Trail. The highway crosses K-4, which closely follows the former Bee Line, which began in Scott City and went east to Herington. In Ellsworth, the highway crosses the former Golden Belt, which began in Denver and went east to Kansas City. Further north in Lincoln, the highway intersects the former Blue Line, which began in Limon and went east to Junction City. In Beloit, K-14 crosses the former Roosevelt National Highway, which ran from Washington, D.C. west to Los Angeles and San Francisco; the former Sunflower Trail; and the former Kansas White Way, which began in Colorado Springs and went east to St. Joseph. The section of K-14 that overlaps US-36 closely follows the Pikes Peak Ocean to Ocean Highway, which was formed in 1912, and went from New York City to Los Angeles.

=== Establishment ===
K-14 was first designated as a state highway in 1926, and began at K-44 in Anthony and ran north through Kingman, Ellsworth, Beloit, and Mankato to the Nebraska border. Also at that time, it had a brief overlap with K-36 south of Harper. By 1927, K-36 had been renumbered as K-12, which was renumbered as US-160 by 1931. By 1928, K-14 was realigned to follow US-36 east from Mankato for a short distance then turn north toward Superior, Nebraska. By 1932, K-44 was truncated to Anthony and K-14 was extended west along the former K-44 to K-8 in Kiowa. By 1933, K-14 was extended west from Kiowa to Hardtner then south from there to the Oklahoma border, which created a short overlap with K-8. By 1939, K-8 was truncated to the west end of the overlap with K-14. Also at this time K-8 north of there became US-281, which also paralleled K-14 west from there through Hardtner to the Nebraska border.

=== Realignments ===
Prior to 1936, K-14 continued north from where it currently curves northeast just north of the Lincoln-Mitchell county line. It continued north for 2.1 miles (3.4 km) then turned east and followed present day V Road for two miles (3.2 km) and met its current alignment. Then in a February 18, 1936, resolution, the highway was realigned to curve northeast at present day X Road then back north at present day V Road. Construction on the new alignment was completed by 1937. In an October 8, 1947, resolution, the section of K-14 between Duquoin and the Chickaskia River was realigned onto a new alignment slightly to the east. Prior to 1949, K-14 turned west just north of US-160. It continued west for two miles (3.2 km) then turned north, and continued six miles (9.7 km) before turning east to meet the current alignment by Duquoin. Then in a February 25, 1949, resolution, a new alignment was built slightly east which eliminated four turns. Prior to 1951, US-24 followed K-14 south through the city of Beloit to East South Street, then turned east and soon exited the city to the east. In a February 28, 1951, resolution, it was approved to realign US-24 to the east of the city, which eliminated the overlap with K-14. By April 1, 1951, the State Highway Commission began accepting bids for the bypass. The new realignment of US-24 was completed by 1952. Around this time K-129 was extended south to K-14, then east along the former routing of US-24.

Before 1953, K-18 entered Lincoln from the west via West North Street to K-14. It then turned south and followed K-14 to Lincoln Avenue, where it turned east and soon exited the city. In an April 8, 1953, resolution, it was approved to realign K-18 onto a new roadway about .5 miles (0.80 km) north of West North Street. The new alignment still turned south onto K-14, which increased the overlap about .5 miles (0.80 km). Then in a May 9, 1958, resolution, it was approved to continue K-18 east past K-14, which eliminated the overlap between K-14 and K-18. In 1962, a new bridge was built for K-14 where it crossed the Saline River, just south of Lincoln. The former bridge was slightly west of the current bridge, and the highway entered Lincoln on 5th Street. In a March 28, 1962, resolution, the new bridge was approved as well as a new .923-mile-long (1.485 km) highway to meet the new bridge, which now entered Lincoln on 6th Street. The old bridge was kept in place and given to Lincoln County for the use of fisherman.

When the city of Ellsworth Chamber of Commerce found out that I-70 was to be built north of the city, a meeting was requested by the Chamber with the State Highway Commission. The Chamber claimed that "I-70 follows US-40 through practically all the rest of the state", and wanted the State Highway Commission to change plans to have the route pass through the city. Once the State Highway Commission explained the reason for bypassing Ellsworth, the city dropped their objection on the condition that K-14 be kept as a state highway to link to I-70. In early 1961, a $361,397 (equivalent to $632,510 in 2025) project began to build a bypass highway to the east of Ellsworth. K-45 (modern K-156) was to be extended northeast over the new bypass to US-40 (modern K-140). A work order was issued to the San-Ore Construction Company of McPherson in August 1961, to pave the bypass at a cost of $117,012.17 (equivalent to $204,792 in 2025). The new bypass was completed by the end of 1961. By July 1964, the State Highway Commission approved to extend K-45 about 10.7 miles (17.2 km) northeast to I-70. In 1963, the State Highway Commission proposed that once the section of K-45 between US-40 and I-70 is built, that K-14 would be rerouted along the new K-45 to I-70. The city of Ellsworth claimed it would add 4.5 miles (7.2 km) to westbound I-70 from the city. The city urged the state keep K-14 as a connector route to I-70, citing the previous agreement made between the city and state. Between 1966 and 1967, the new highway was completed between US-40 and I-70. At this time US-156 was extended northeast from Larned along US-56 to Great Bend, then along K-45 to I-70 northeast of Ellsworth. This resulted in K-45 being eliminated. On October 13, 1967, US-40 was rerouted to overlap the newly constructed section of I-70 from Dorrance east to Salina. On November 27, 1968, old US-40 from Ellsworth eastward to Salina was designated as K-140. Between 1966 and 1967, exit 221 was constructed on I-70. K-14 originally continued north past exit 219 of I-70, then curved west and followed the interstate for about 2.9 miles (4.7 km) then curved back north. In a December 20, 1967, resolution, K-14 was realigned to get on I-70 at exit 219 then east to exit 221 where it exited and resumed a northern course to meet the former alignment.

Prior to 1994, K-14 continued south along K-2 to Anthony then continued westward along K-2 through Kiowa to US-281. K-2 ended here and K-14 continued along US-281 south to the Oklahoma border where it ended. Then in a December 24, 1994, resolution, K-14 was truncated to end at K-2 and US-160 in Harper, which eliminated the overlap with US-281, US-160, and K-2. Prior to 1996, K-28 overlapped K-14 from K-28's current western terminus north to the southern end of the overlap with US-36, then continued west along US-36. Then on February 8, 1996, K-28 was truncated to K-14 in Jewell.

Prior to 2009, K-14 went due north from K-61 in Arlington along present day Sego Road to K-96, which it turned west onto. In a September 9, 2009, resolution, K-14 was rerouted along K-61 from Arlington to South Hutchinson then along K-96 from South Hutchinson through Nickerson to the former end of the K-14 and K-96 overlap west of Nickerson at Sego Road. Then in 2012, it was realigned further east between Kingman and South Hutchinson. Before then, K-14 followed US-54/US-400 west out of Kingman for four miles (6.4 km). From there it went north to K-61 in Arlington then followed K-61 northwest and met K-96 southwest of Hutchinson, which it followed north. In a December 14, 2012, resolution, it was approved to realign K-14 to travel east from Kingman then north along the former K-17 to K-96, which it followed northward and met its old alignment southwest of Hutchison. The former section of K-14 from US-54 and US-400 north to K-61 in Arlington became K-11. At first the 2012 highway designations changes caused some confusion. On February 6, 2013, a rollover occurred on the section of K-14 that was formerly K-17, and the caller accidentally gave an old location to dispatchers. The ambulance made it to the correct location, but the tow truck arrived on the old alignment of K-14, which is 14 miles (23 km) to the west.

== Future ==
KDOT plans to realign K-14 and K-96 between the north end of the super two, southeast of Nickerson, to the current alignment north of Sterling, which will bypass Nickerson and Sterling. The new $96.5 million highway will be a super two, built on a four-lane right-of-way. As of October 2017, there were only three tracts in Rice County and two tracts in Reno County that needed to be purchased. In 2019, KDOT announced that construction is expected to begin in April 2021, and to be completed by November 2022. The project, part of a plan to build a diagonal corridor from Wichita northwest through Hutchinson and Great Bend to I-70 in Hays, was first considered by the state Legislature in 1986. Construction of the Reno and Rice county segment was originally going to begin January 2017 and be complete by June 2018, but was cancelled then due to lack of funding. On April 9, 2021, KDOT announced that the $81.7 million project will begin around April 26, 2021, and will be completed by June 16, 2023. The new section will be a super-two built to freeway standards, so it could be easily upgrade to four-lanes in the future. It will have a 70-mile-per-hour speed limit and no at-grade intersections. Diamond interchanges are going to be installed at 56th and Nickerson Boulevard in Reno County, as well as north of Sterling in Reno County. Bob Bergkamp Construction Company Incorporated of Wichita will be the primary contractor on the project.

== Major intersections ==
All exits are unnumbered.

County	Location	mi	km	Destinations	Notes
Harper	Harper	0.000	0.000	US-160 / K-2 – Anthony, Wellington	Southern terminus; highway continues as US-160 west/K-2 south; former K-14 south
Kingman	Rago	12.506	20.126	K-42 – Wichita	
Kingman	Kingman	26.162	42.104	US-54 west / US-400 west (D Avenue) – Pratt	Southern end of US-54/US-400 overlap; former K-14 north
Kingman		30.344	48.834	40th Avenue	Partial cloverleaf interchange; southern end of freeway
Kingman		33.321	53.625	70th Avenue	Diamond interchange
Kingman		36.321	58.453	US-54 east / US-400 east – Wichita	Northern end of US-54/US-400 overlap; diamond interchange; northern end of overlap with freeway
Reno		57.459	92.471	K-96 east – Wichita	Southern end of K-96 overlap
Reno	South Hutchinson	60.184	96.857	US-50 east / K-61 north (John Neal Memorial Highway) / Main Street north – Newton, McPherson	Eastern end of US-50/K-61 overlap; diamond interchange; east end of expressway section; access to Hutchinson Regional Medical Center
Reno		61.696	99.290	US-50 west / K-61 south (John Neal Memorial Highway) – Kinsley, Pratt	Western end of US-50/K-61 overlap; half-clover interchange; west end of expressway section; south end of super two; former K-14 south
Reno		63.402	102.036	6th Avenue	
Reno		65.084	104.743	4th Avenue	
Reno		67.606	108.801	Wilson Road / Nickerson Boulevard	
Reno				56th Avenue – Nickerson	
Reno				Nickerson Road	
Rice				Sterling	North end of super two
Rice	Lyons	94.319	151.792	US-56 / K-96 west (Main Street) – Great Bend, McPherson	Northern end of K-96 overlap
Rice		105.895	170.421	K-4 – Hoisington, Lindsborg	
Ellsworth		120.214	193.466	K-156 / K-14 Truck north to I-70 – Great Bend	Southern terminus of K-14 Truck
Ellsworth	Ellsworth	122.347	196.898	K-140 east / K-14 Truck south (15th Street) to I-135	Western terminus of K-140; northern terminus of K-14 Truck; serves Ellsworth County Medical Center
Ellsworth		129.800	208.893	I-70 west / US-40 west – Hays	Southern end of I-70/US-40 overlap; exit 219 on I-70; diamond interchange
Ellsworth		132.713	213.581	I-70 east / US-40 east – Salina	Northern end of I-70/US-40 overlap; exit 221 on I-70; diamond interchange
Lincoln	Lincoln	147.514	237.401	K-18 – Plainville, Junction City	
Lincoln		157.111	252.846	K-284 east – Barnard	Western terminus of K-284
Mitchell	Beloit	178.516	287.294	US-24 / K-9 to US-81 – Osborne, Clay Center	
Jewell	Jewell	193.566	311.514	K-28 east (Delaware Street) – Concordia	Western terminus of K-28
Jewell		201.600	324.444	US-36 west – Mankato	Southern end of US-36 overlap
Jewell		204.053	328.391	US-36 east – Belleville	Northern end of US-36 overlap
40th parallel north		219.276	352.891	N-14 north / Elm Road – Superior	Kansas–Nebraska line; highway continues into Nebraska as N-14
1.000 mi = 1.609 km; 1.000 km = 0.621 mi: Concurrency terminus

== K-14 Truck ==
K-14 Truck
- Location: Ellsworth
- Length: 2.790 mi (4.490 km)

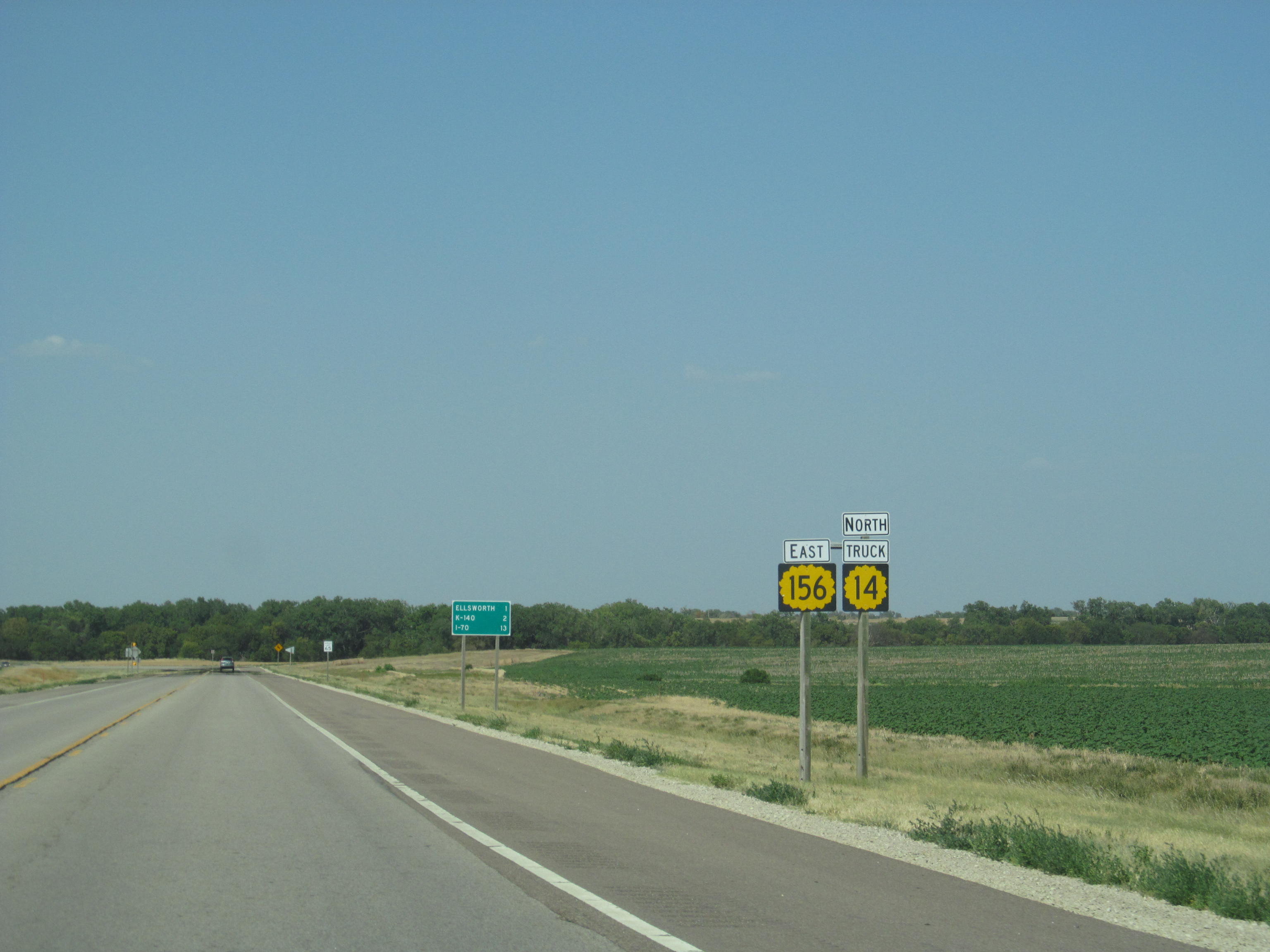
K-14 Truck concurrent with K-156

K-14 Truck is a 2.790-mile-long (4.490 km) truck route in Ellsworth. K-14 Truck begins at K-14 and K-156 south of Ellsworth and proceeds northeast along K-156. K-14 Truck and K-156 continue through flat rural farmland for about .8 miles (1.3 km) then crosses the Smoky Hill River. The highway then passes over a Union Pacific Railway track and Blake Street. Blake Street is accessed via a short connector road. The roadway then curves north and intersects K-140 roughly .5 miles (0.80 km) later. At this point it turns west and begins to follow K-140, as K-156 continues north. K-14 Truck and K-140 continue west for .5 miles (0.80 km) then end at K-14.

=== Major junctions ===
The entire route is in Ellsworth County.

Location	mi	km	Destinations	Notes
	0.000	0.000	K-156 west – Great Bend / K-14 – Lyons, Ellsworth	Southern terminus; southern end of K-156 overlap; highway continues west as K-156
Ellsworth	1.076	1.732	Kanopolis	Partial interchange; access via southbound exit ramp and connector road
Ellsworth	2.295	3.693	K-140 east (Avenue J) to I-135 / K-156 east to I-70	Northern end of K-156 overlap; southern end of K-140 overlap
Ellsworth	2.790	4.490	K-140 ends / K-14 – Ellsworth, Lincoln	Northern terminus; northern end of K-140 overlap; western terminus of K-140; road continues west as 15th Street
1.000 mi = 1.609 km; 1.000 km = 0.621 mi: Concurrency terminus

== See also ==
- List of state highways in Kansas
