= Atlantic and Pacific =

Atlantic and Pacific may refer to:

- Great Atlantic and Pacific Tea Company
- Atlantic and Pacific Railroad
- Atlantic and Pacific Highway
- Atlantic and Pacific Telegraph Company
- Atlantic Avenue – Barclays Center (New York City Subway) (formerly Atlantic Avenue – Pacific Street); subway station serving the 2, 3, 4, 5, B, D, N, Q, R and W trains

== See also ==
- Pacific and Atlantic, the news agency
