= K-284 =

K-284 may refer to:

- Russian submarine K-284 Akula
- K-284 (Kansas highway)
- K. 284, Wolfgang Amadeus Mozart's Piano Sonata No. 6 in D major
