= K-124 (Kansas highway) =

Former state highway in Kansas, United States

K-124
- Former K-124 highlighted in red

Route information
- Maintained by KDOT
- Length: 1.0 mi (1.6 km)
- Existed: August 13, 1958–c. 1986

Major junctions
- West end: K-14 in Beloit
- East end: US-24 in Beloit

Location
- Country: United States
- State: Kansas
- Counties: Mitchell

Highway system
- Kansas State Highway System; Interstate; US; State; Spurs
← K-123	→ K-126

K-124 was a 1.0-mile-long (1.6 km) east–west state highway in the U.S. state of Kansas. K-124's western terminus was at K-14 and, until 1966, K-129 in the city of Beloit and the eastern terminus was at U.S. Route 24 (US-24) in Beloit. It is now known as East Main Street.

== Route description ==
K-124's western terminus was at an intersection with K-14 in the city of Beloit. The highway travelled east along East Main Street through a residential area. After 1.0 mile (1.6 km) the highway reached its eastern terminus at US-24 near the eastern border of Beloit.

K-124 was not included in the National Highway System. The National Highway System is a system of highways important to the nation's defense, economy, and mobility. K-124 did connect to the National Highway System at its eastern terminus, US-24.

== History ==
US-24 originally entered the Beloit on Asherville Road. The highway then curved north becoming Brooklyn Avenue until reaching Elliot Street where it turned back west. It then intersected River Street, where it turned north and crossed a series of railroad tracks. After crossing the tracks, US-24 turned west onto East South Street then intersected K-14. US-24 followed K-14 north through the city to its current alignment. In a February 28, 1951, it was approved to realign US-24 to the east of Beloit. In April 1951, a bid was approved for $100,330 (equivalent to $969,162 in 2024) to build the new section of US-24. Then in an August 13, 1958 resolution, it was approved to designate K-124 from the new alignment of US-24 west to K-14 in Beloit as soon as the county and city had finished necessary projects to bring the road up to state highway standards. Then, by mid-October 1958, the necessary projects had been completed, and in an October 22, 1958 resolution, it became K-124. K-124 was decommissioned in 1986, and is now known as East Main Street.

== Major intersections ==
The entire route was in Beloit, Mitchell County.

mi	km	Destinations	Notes
0.0	0.0	K-14	Western terminus
1.0	1.6	US-24	Eastern terminus
1.000 mi = 1.609 km; 1.000 km = 0.621 mi
