= K-129 (1947–1966 Kansas highway) =

Former state highway in Kansas, United States

K-129
- Former K-129 highlighted in red

Route information
- Maintained by KDOT
- Length: 3.25 mi (5.23 km)
- Existed: October 22, 1947–1966

Major junctions
- South end: US 24 in Beloit
- North end: US 24 / K-9 in Beloit

Location
- Country: United States
- State: Kansas
- Counties: Mitchell

Highway system
- Kansas State Highway System; Interstate; US; State; Spurs
| ← K-128 | → K-129 |

K-129 was a 3.25-mile-long (5.23 km) state highway in the U.S. state of Kansas. K-129's southern terminus was at U.S. Route 24 (US-24) in the city of Beloit and the northern terminus was at US-24 and K-9 in Beloit. Within the city, the highway briefly overlapped K-14.

K-129 was first designated as a state highway on October 22, 1947, to a highway running from the north city limits of Beloit to K-9. On February 28, 1951, it was approved to realign US-24 further along K-9 and to the east of Beloit. Around this time K-129 was extended south to K-14, then along the former routing of US-24.

== Route description ==
K-129 began at US-24 southeast of Beloit and began travelling west along Asherville Road. The highway then curved north becoming Brooklyn Avenue until reaching Elliot Street where it turned back west. It then intersected River Street, where it turned north and crossed a series of railroad tracks. After crossing the tracks, K-129 turned west onto East South Street then intersected K-14. At this point K-129 turned north and began to overlap K-14. The two routes continued north for .13 miles (0.21 km) and intersected at the western terminus of K-124 (East Main Street). K-129 and K-14 continued north for another .5 miles (0.80 km) before reaching East 8th Street, where K-14 turned west and K-129 continued north along North Hershey Avenue. It continued north for then curved east briefly before turning back north onto North Walnut Street. K-129 continued past the then reached its northern terminus at US-24 and K-9.

== History ==
K-129 was first designated as a state highway on October 22, 1947, and at that time ran from K-9 south to the north city limits of Beloit. The section of K-129 from its southern terminus to the north end of the K-14 overlap was originally part of US-24. US-24 was approved to be realigned to the east of Beloit in a February 28, 1951 resolution. Around this time K-129 was extended south to K-14, then along the former routing of US-24.

== Major intersections ==
The entire route was in Beloit, Mitchell County.

| mi | km | Destinations | Notes |
|---|---|---|---|
| 0.00 | 0.00 | US 24 | Southern terminus |
| 1.55 | 2.49 | K-14 south (South Hershey Avenue) | Southern end of K-14 overlap |
| 1.68 | 2.70 | K-124 east (East Main Street) | Western terminus of K-124 |
| 2.18 | 3.51 | K-14 north (East 8th Street) | Northern end of K-14 overlap |
| 3.25 | 5.23 | US 24 / K-9 | Northern terminus |
1.000 mi = 1.609 km; 1.000 km = 0.621 mi: Concurrency terminus
