= K-129 (1980–1997 Kansas highway) =

Former state highway in Kansas, United States

K-129
- Former K-129 highlighted in red

Route information
- Maintained by KDOT
- Length: 0.446 mi (718 m)
- Existed: August 12, 1980–c. 1996

Major junctions
- South end: K-154 in Dodge City
- North end: US-56 / US-283 / US 50 Bus. in Dodge City

Location
- Country: United States
- State: Kansas
- Counties: Ford

Highway system
- Kansas State Highway System; Interstate; US; State; Spurs
← K-129	→ K-130

K-129 was a 0.446-mile-long (0.718 km) state highway in the U.S. state of Kansas. K-129's southern terminus was at K-154 in Dodge City and the northern terminus was at U.S. Route 56 (US-56), US-283 and US-50 Business (US-50 Bus.) in Dodge City.

K-129 was first designated as a state highway in 1980, replacing US-154 Spur. Then in 1994, when US-400 was created, K-129 was decommissioned and became a part of a newly rerouted US-56, US-283 and US-400.

== Route description ==
K-129 began at K-154 and started travelling north, and soon intersected Lariat Drive. It continued north for a short distance, crossed the railroad tracks, then reached its northern terminus at US-56, US-283 and US-50 Business.

The Kansas Department of Transportation (KDOT) tracks the traffic levels on its highways, and in 1995, they determined that on average the traffic was 6420 vehicles on K-129.

== History ==
The highway that became K-129 was first designated as US-154 Spur in a December 22, 1948 resolution. In an August 12, 1980 resolution, U.S. 154 Spur was decommissioned and became K-129. In a December 5, 1994 resolution, it was planned to decommission K-129 and make it a part of a newly rerouted US-56, US-283 and US-400, once other parts of US-400 were built. Then by 1996, K-129 had been decommissioned and became part of the new alignment of US-56, US-283 and US-400.

== Major intersections ==
The entire route was in Dodge City, Ford County.

mi	km	Destinations	Notes
0.000	0.000	K-154	Southern terminus
0.400	0.644	US-56 / US-283 / US 50 Bus.	Northern terminus
1.000 mi = 1.609 km; 1.000 km = 0.621 mi
