= Wolf Creek (White Rock Creek tributary) =

- Location of the mouth of Wolf Creek Wolf Creek (White Rock Creek tributary) (the United States)

Location
- Country: United States
- State: Kansas
- County: Jewell

Physical characteristics
- Source
  - coordinates: 39°56′38″N 98°19′08″W
- Mouth: White Rock Creek
  - location: Northeast of Burr Oak
  - coordinates: 39°53′29″N 98°16′40″W
  - elevation: 1,621 ft (494 m)

Wolf Creek is a river in Jewell County in the U.S. State of Kansas. Wolf Creek flows into the White Rock Creek northeast of the City of Burr Oak.
