= Nebraska Highway 78 =

State highway in Nebraska, U.S.

State Highway 78

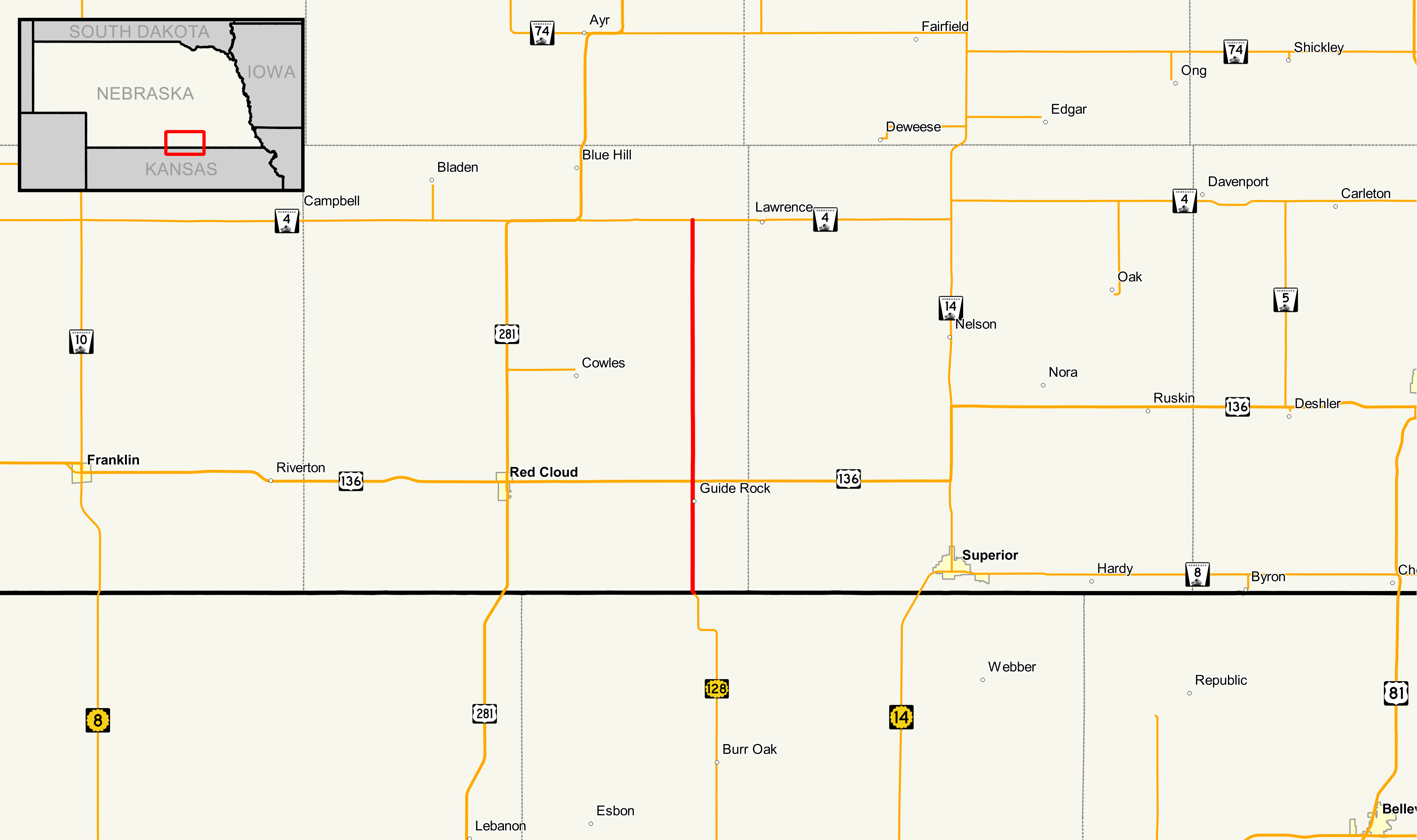
- Nebraska Highway 78 highlighted in red

Route information
- Maintained by NDOT
- Length: 20.02 mi (32.22 km)
- Existed: 1934–present

Major junctions
- South end: K-128 at the Kansas border near Guide Rock
- US 136 north of Guide Rock
- North end: N-4 west of Lawrence

Location
- Country: United States
- State: Nebraska
- Counties: Webster

Highway system
- Nebraska State Highway System; Interstate; US; State; Link; Spur; State Spurs; Recreation
← US 77	→ N-79

Nebraska Highway 78 is a highway in southern Nebraska. It has a southern terminus at the Kansas border where it continues from K-28. Its northern terminus is at an intersection with Nebraska Highway 4 west of Lawrence.

== Route description ==
Nebraska Highway 78 begins at the Kansas border, as a continuation of K-128 south of Guide Rock. The entire route of NE 78 is a straight north–south road through mostly farmland. It heads north from the Kansas border, passing through Guide Rock. To the north of Guide Rock, the highway intersects US 136. It then continues northward until it reaches its termination point at NE 4 west of Lawrence.

== Major intersections ==
The entire route is in Webster County.

Location	mi	km	Destinations	Notes
	0.00	0.00	K-128 south	Continuation into Kansas
Guide Rock	6.00	9.66	US 136	
	20.02	32.22	N-4	Northern terminus
1.000 mi = 1.609 km; 1.000 km = 0.621 mi
