= Yuma, Kansas =

Ghost town in Cloud County, Kansas

Coordinates: 39°35′28″N 97°44′59″W

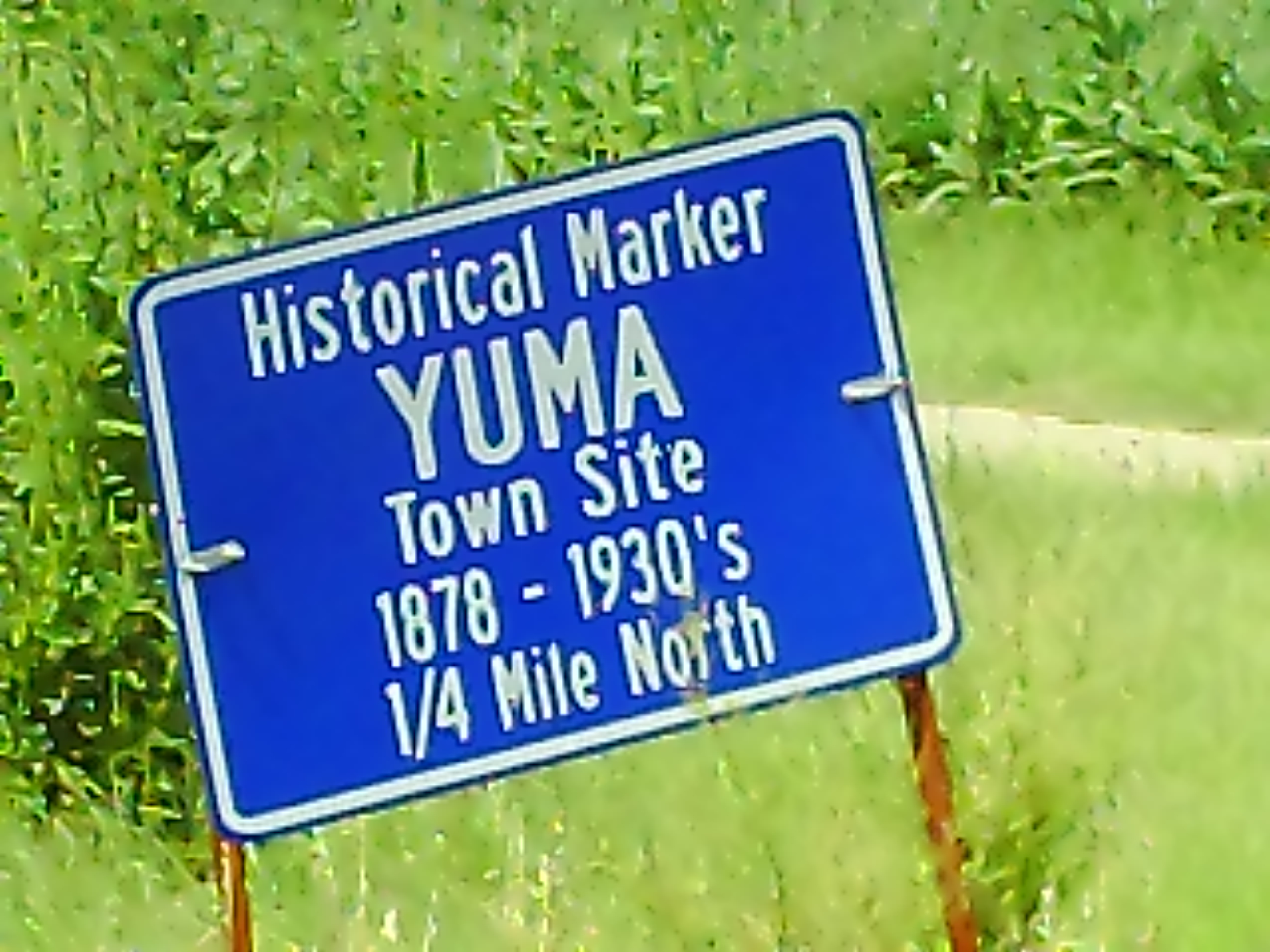
Road sign indicating historical marker of Yuma, Kansas

Yuma is a ghost town in Cloud County, Kansas, United States. It is located west of Concordia, near the intersections of K-28 and County Road 777.

== History ==
Yuma had a post office for some time between May 1880 and December 1900.

A historical marker remains where the town once stood, which was populated from 1878 until the 1930s.
