= Walnut Creek (White Rock Creek tributary) =

- Location of the mouth of Walnut Creek Walnut Creek (White Rock Creek tributary) (the United States)

Location
- Country: United States
- State: Kansas
- County: Jewell

Physical characteristics
- Source
  - coordinates: 39°59′29″N 98°23′30″W
- Mouth: White Rock Creek
  - coordinates: 39°53′01″N 98°17′22″W
  - elevation: 1,624 ft (495 m)

Walnut Creek is a river in Jewell County in the U.S. State of Kansas. Walnut Creek flows into the White Rock Creek northeast of the City of Burr Oak.
