= K-284 (Kansas highway) =

State highway in Kansas, U.S.

K-284

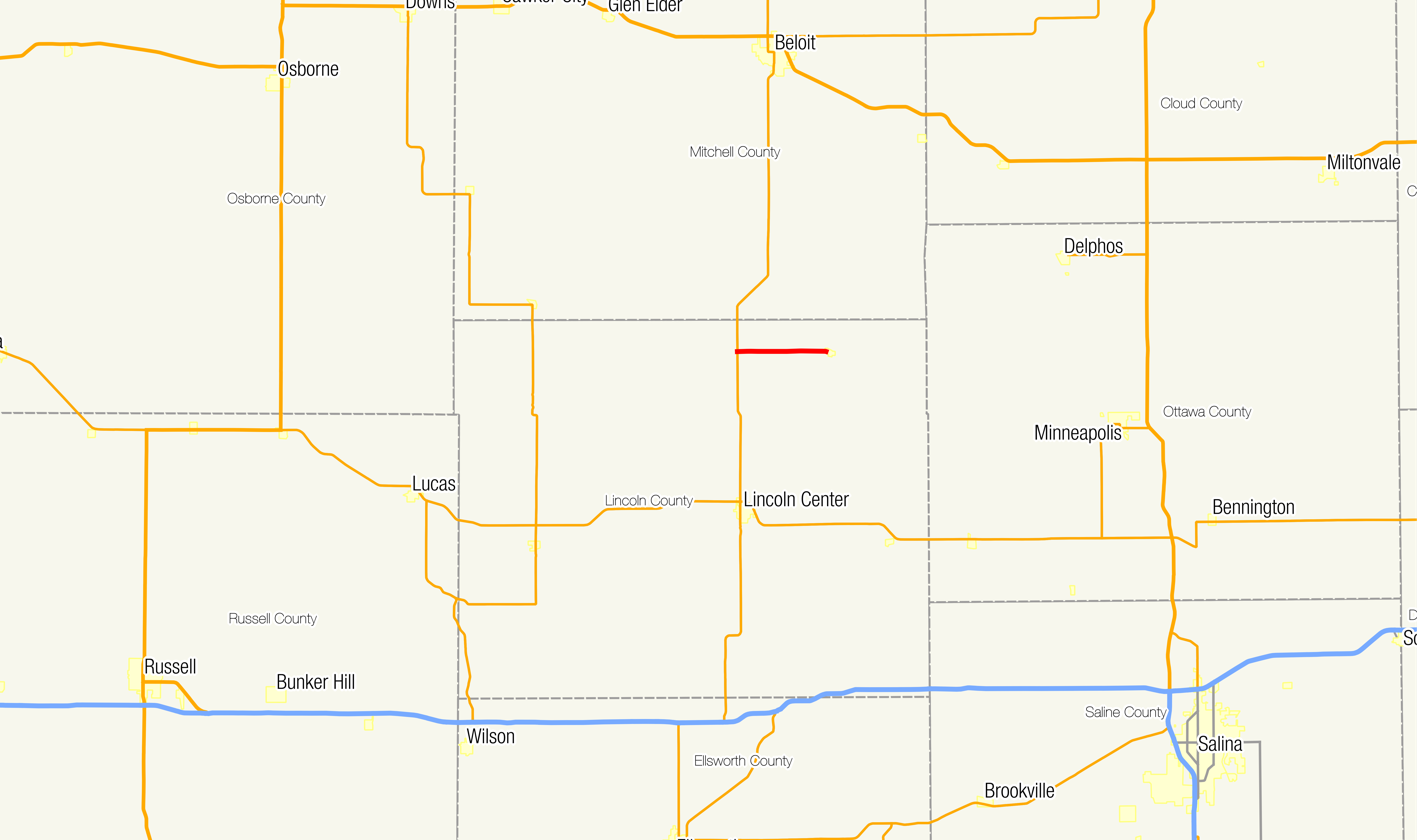

Route information
- Maintained by KDOT
- Length: 5.618 mi (9.041 km)
- Existed: 1972–present

Major junctions
- West end: K-14 north of Lincoln
- East end: Barnard

Location
- Country: United States
- State: Kansas
- Counties: Lincoln

Highway system
- Kansas State Highway System; Interstate; US; State; Spurs
| ← US-283 | → K-285 |

K-284 is a state highway in the U.S. state of Kansas. The highway runs 5.618 miles (9.041 km) from K-14 east to Barnard in northern Lincoln County. The Kansas State Highway Commission wished to establish a state highway connection to Barnard in the 1960s, which they accomplished when they built K-284 in the early 1970s.

== Route description ==
K-284 heads east from K-14 between Lincoln and Beloit, 2 miles (3.2 km) south of the Lincoln–Mitchell county line. The highway crosses Prosser Creek and an unnamed creek, both tributaries of Rattlesnake Creek, before the highway ends at the west city limit of Barnard. The road continues as Ballard Avenue into Barnard, which lies south of the confluence of Rattlesnake Creek with Salt Creek, which flows into the Solomon River. The Kansas Department of Transportation measured an annual average daily traffic of 190 vehicles on K-284 in 2021.

== History ==
As of 1960, the direct link between K-14 and Barnard was a gravel road maintained by Lincoln County. On March 21, 1961, the Kansas State Highway Commission (predecessor of the Kansas Department of Transportation) designated a 5.711-mile-long (9.191 km) link between K-14 and Barnard as K-237. However, by February 15, 1966, the commission had not constructed the link, so the agency decided to create plans for the link and hand them over to Lincoln County to construct. The Kansas State Highway Commission handed the plans to Lincoln County on March 29, 1967, and the commission deleted K-237 from the state highway system. The state later assigned K-237 to a spur serving Perry State Park in northeastern Kansas. By 1971, the direct link from K-14 to Barnard remained a gravel road.

The Kansas State Highway Commission returned to the matter of a spur from K-14 to Barnard in a November 23, 1971, resolution, when the commission designated K-225 to provide a safe and convenient connection between K-14 and Barnard. However, four weeks later, the commission resolved to renumber the Barnard spur because K-225 was already used for a detour from U.S. Route 81 to Interstate 35W (now Interstate 135) at the south end of Wichita. The agency issued an updated resolution to construct the Barnard spur as part of the state highway system as K-284 on January 19, 1972. The next year, the Kansas State Highway Commission recommended that K-284 be removed from the state highway system and that a public hearing be held to discuss the deletion. K-284 first appeared as a paved state highway on the 1974 state highway map. The highway remains on the state highway map as of 2021.

== Major intersections ==
The entire route is in Lincoln County.

| Location | mi | km | Destinations | Notes |
|---|---|---|---|---|
| | 0.000 | 0.000 | K-14 – Beloit, Lincoln | Western terminus |
| Barnard | 5.618 | 9.041 | Ballard Avenue east | Eastern terminus; west city limit of Barnard |
1.000 mi = 1.609 km; 1.000 km = 0.621 mi
