= Jamestown Wildlife Area =

Protected area in Kansas, USA

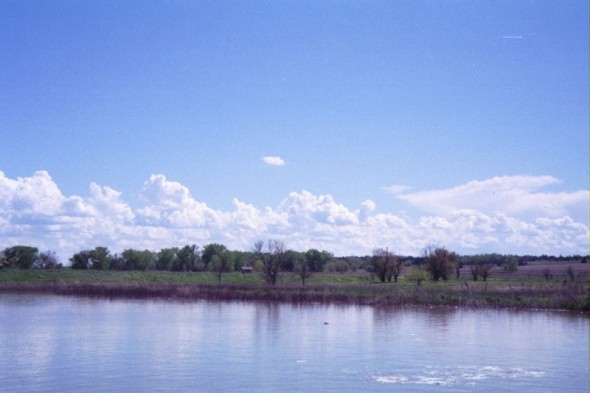
- Looking southwest of the north dam in far southwestern Republic County, 2 April 2010

- Location within Kansas
- Interactive map of Jamestown Wildlife Area
- Location: Republic County, Kansas
- Nearest city: Jamestown, Kansas
- Coordinates: 39°40′00″N 97°54′21″W
- Area: 3,239 ha (12.51 sq mi)
- Designation: Wildlife refuge
- Created: 1923
- Administrator: Kansas Department of Wildlife, Parks and Tourism

Jamestown Wildlife Area consist of 3,239 acres (13.11 km^{2}) in Northern Kansas. It is located primarily in Republic County, Kansas and partially in Cloud County, Kansas. Driving directions are 5 miles (8.0 km) North and 2 miles (3.2 km) West of Jamestown. The area is commonly called "Jamestown Lake" by local residents.

The area is popular for both hunting and fishing. The lake and its surrounding areas are maintained by the Kansas Department of Wildlife, Parks and Tourism.

== History ==
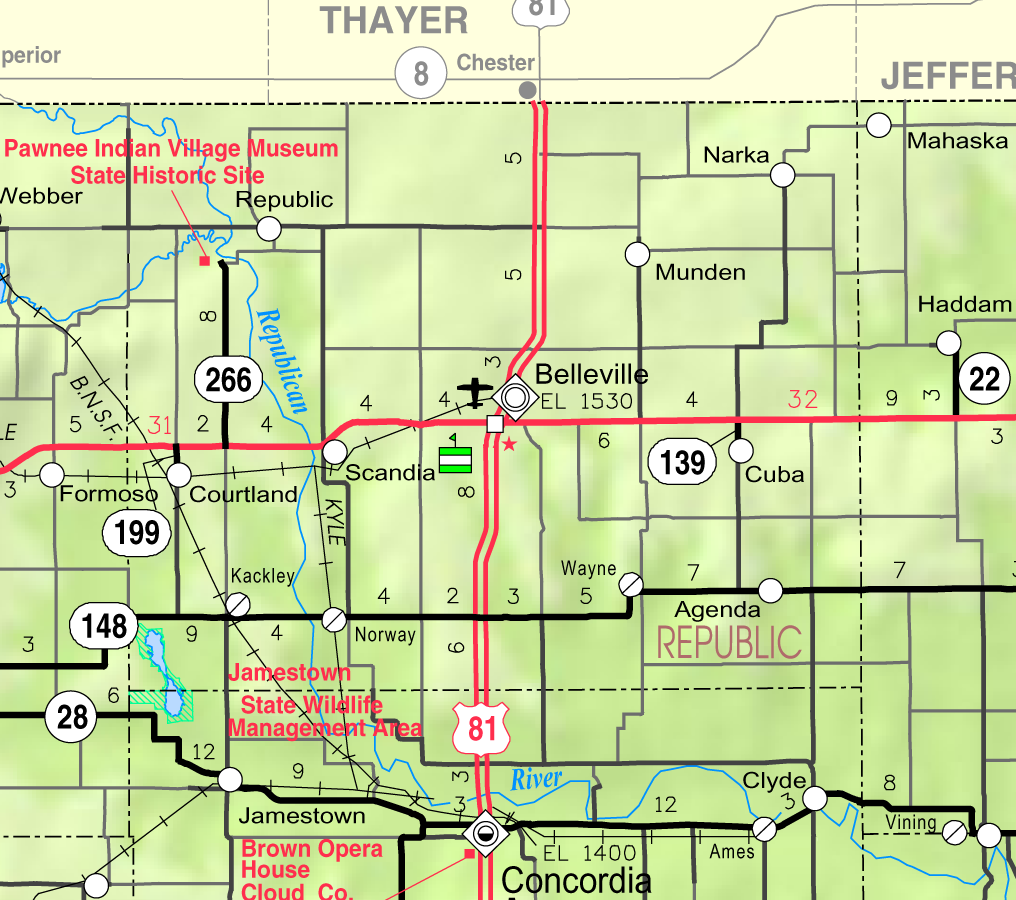
KDOT map of Republic County (legend

The Jamestown Wildlife Area is a collection of wetlands and uplands that have been under state management since 1932. The two larger marshes were one of the twelve wetlands sold to provide funding for Emporia State Teachers College.

Historically, the area was considered a "salty”, shallow, marshy area. In dry seasons salt could be found, and a large amount of wildlife would come to the area in the wet season. The area marshes attracted Native Americans, early settlers and were important to migrating herds of bison, flocks of waterfowl and other wildlife.

Local residents constructed dams on the lower ends of both large marshes in the early 20th century to provide a more reliable water supply for recreation.
