= Limestone Creek (Chattahoochee River tributary) =

Stream in Georgia, U.S.

Coordinates: 34°18′09″N 83°48′55″W

Limestone Creek is a stream in Georgia, and is a tributary of the Chattahoochee River. The creek is approximately 2.32 miles (3.73 km) long.

== Course ==
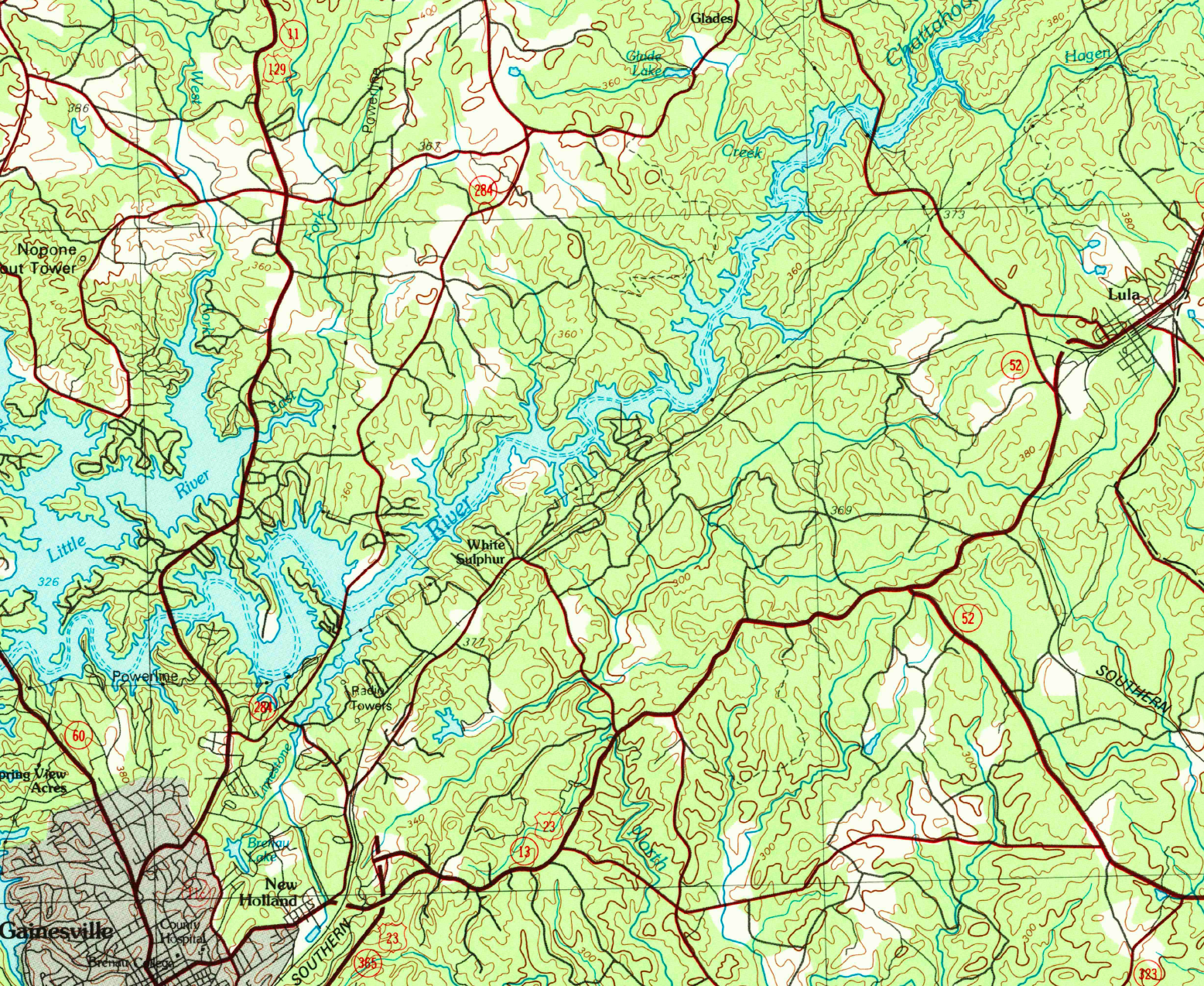
Topographic map showing Limestone Creek and the Chattahoochee River

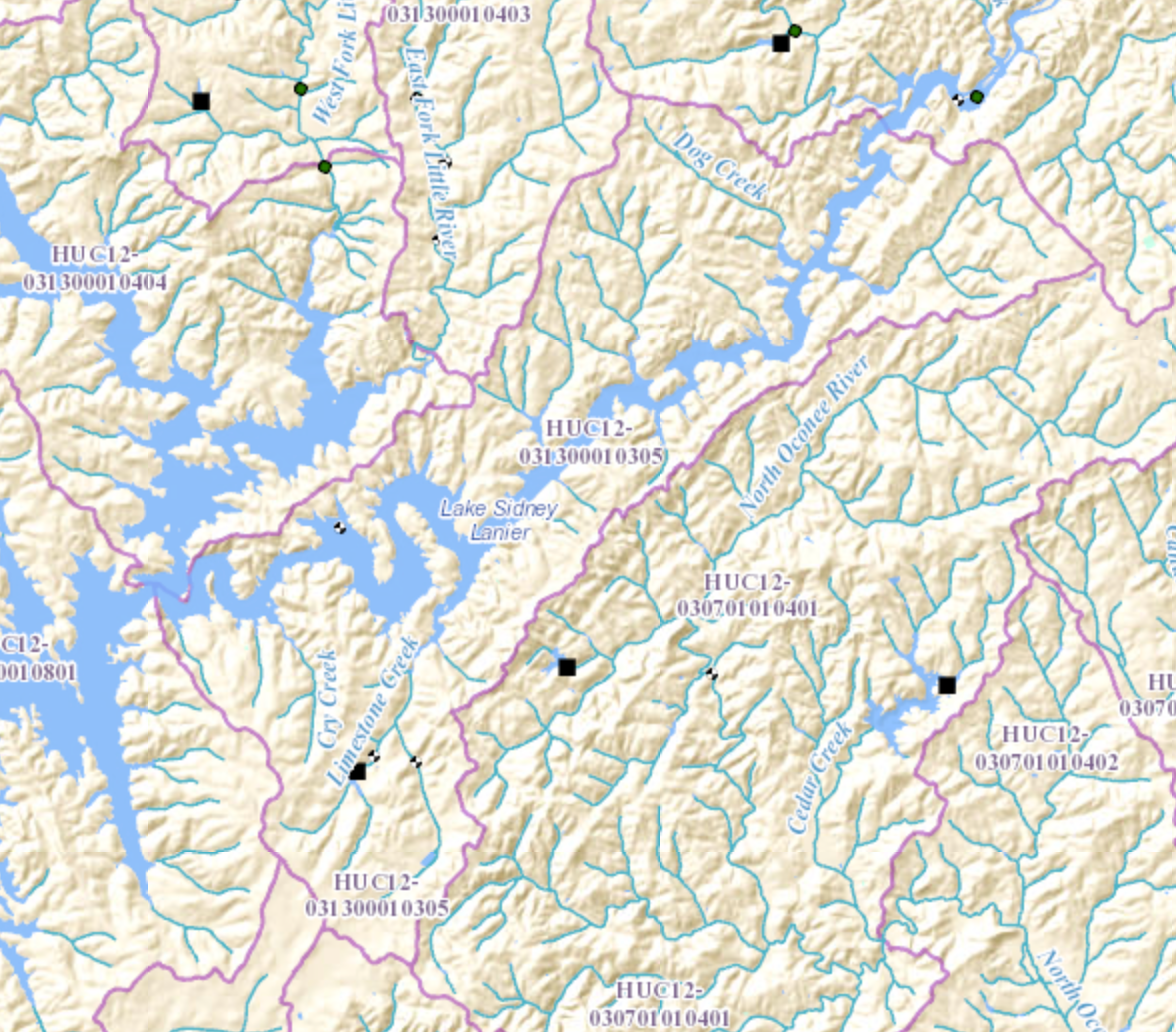
Map showing Limestone Creek and its sub-watershed (outlined in pink), and the Chattahoochee River

Limestone Creek rises in Gainesville, Georgia east of Brenau University, between State Route 365 to the north and Interstate 985 to the south. The creek heads north-northwest and crosses State Route 365, then runs parallel to U.S. Route 129/Limestone Parkway on its way north for just over 1 mile, and crosses US 129 just after it is joined by an unnamed branch. Now heading north-northeast, Limestone Creek flows into the Chattahoochee River branch of Lake Lanier just east of the intersection between US 129 and State Route 284/Clarks Bridge Road.

== Sub-watershed details ==
The creek watershed and associated waters is designated by the United States Geological Survey as sub-watershed HUC 031300010305, is named the Limestone Creek-Chattahoochee River sub-watershed, and drains an area of approximately 25 square miles northeast of Gainesville, and north of the Chattahoochee River. The watershed area encompasses the immediate area around the Chattahoochee branch of Lake Lanier from the confluence of Flat Creek and the Chattahoochee River to southwest of the source of Limestone Creek in central Gainesville, and only includes one other named creek, Dog Creek in the watershed's northeastern corner.

== See also ==
- Water Resource Region
- South Atlantic-Gulf Water Resource Region
- Apalachicola basin
