= Jamestown, Kansas =

City in Cloud County, Kansas

- City
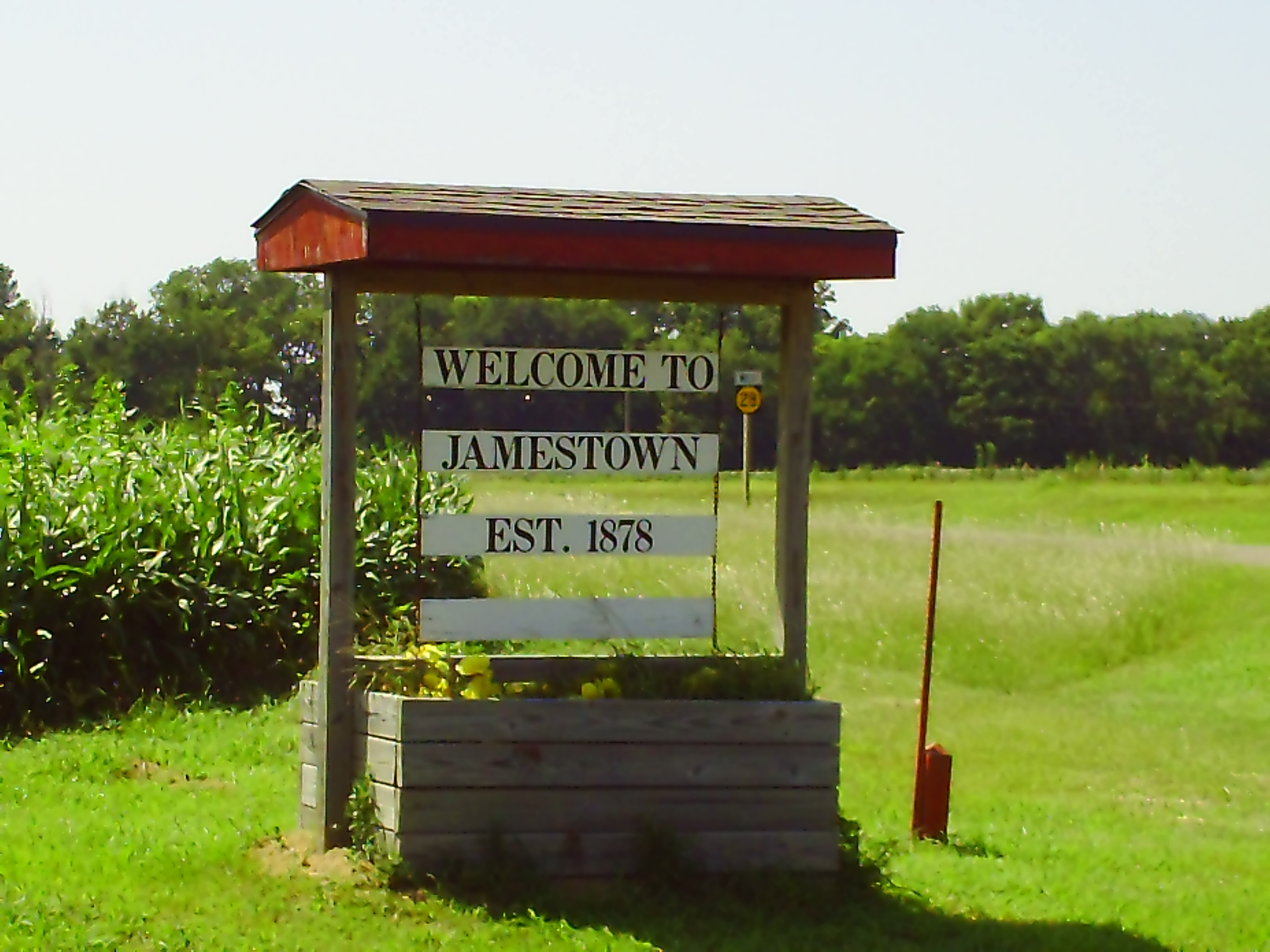
- Welcome sign, north of town (2011)

- Location within Cloud County and Kansas

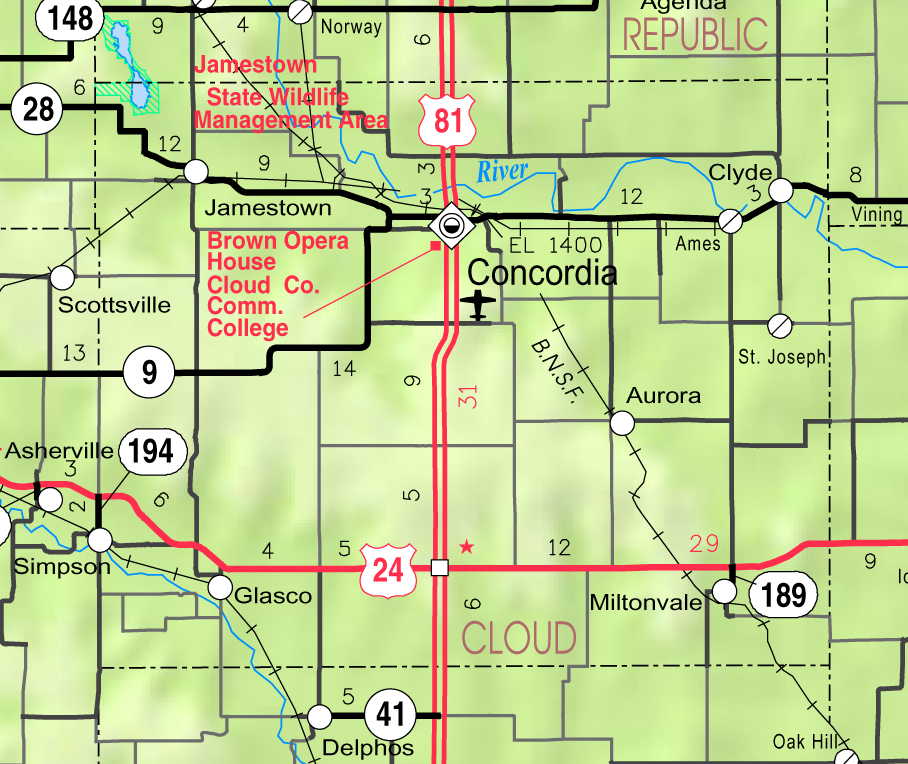
- KDOT map of Cloud County (legend)
- Coordinates: 39°35′58″N 97°51′41″W
- Country: United States
- State: Kansas
- County: Cloud
- Founded: 1878
- Incorporated: 1883

Area
  - Total: 0.29 sq mi (0.76 km^{2})
  - Land: 0.29 sq mi (0.76 km^{2})
  - Water: 0 sq mi (0.00 km^{2})
- Elevation: 1,434 ft (437 m)

Population (2020)
  - Total: 237
  - Density: 810/sq mi (310/km^{2})
- Time zone: UTC-6 (CST)
  - Summer (DST): UTC-5 (CDT)
- ZIP Code: 66948
- Area code: 785
- FIPS code: 20-34975
- GNIS ID: 2395454

Jamestown is a city in Cloud County, Kansas, United States. As of the 2020 census, the population of the city was 237.

== History ==
Jamestown was founded in 1878, and was incorporated as a city in 1883. It was named for either Senator James Pomeroy, or James P. Pomeroy, a railroad official. A post office was opened in Alva (an extinct town) in 1871, but it was moved to Jamestown in 1878. The town located itself on the Missouri Pacific Railroad.

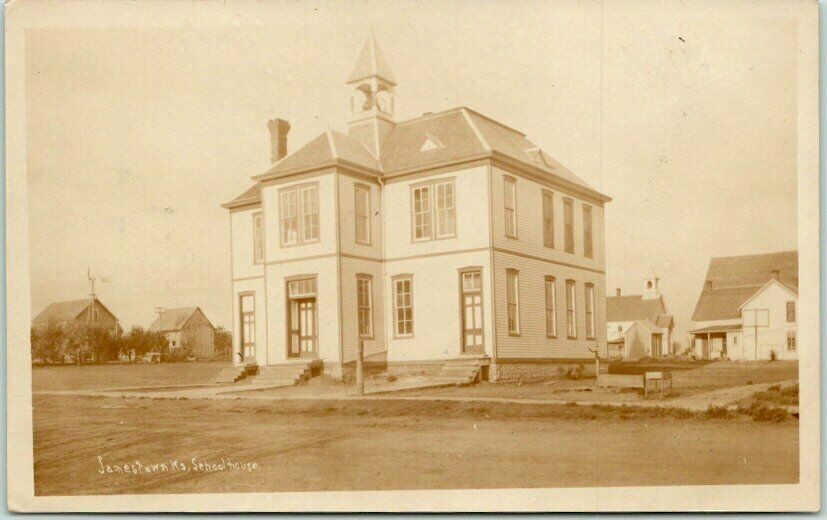
A school in Jamestown in 1908

=== 1911 fire ===
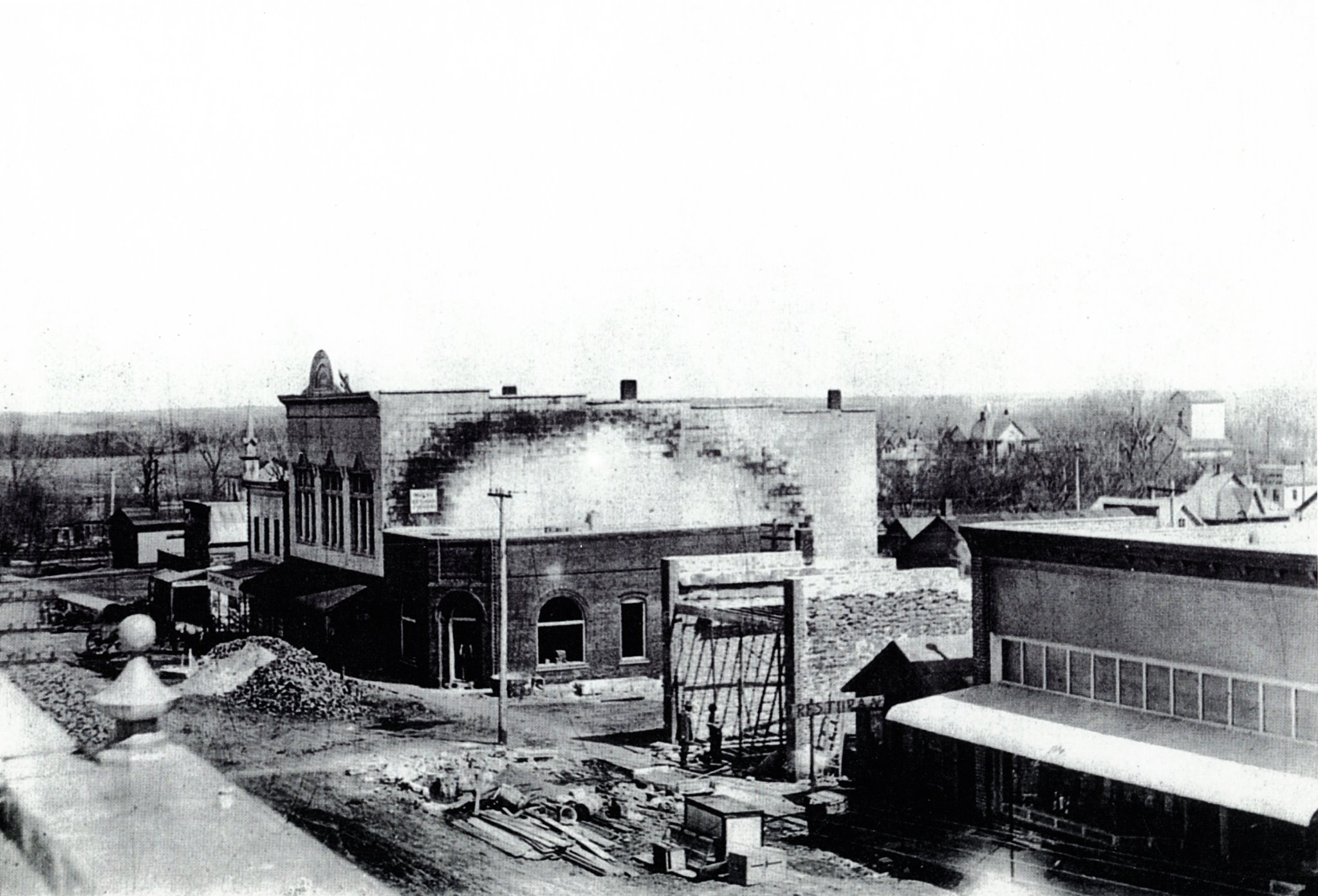
Main street image of Jamestown, Kansas after 1911 fire

In 1911 the entire downtown business district was destroyed by a fire. Few records remain of that fire, but the townspeople subsequently rebuilt the downtown commercial district. Three towns in the area had devastating downtown fires on the same night: Jamestown, Courtland, and Glasco. Damage was reported to amount to $500,000 at the time.

=== 2000 fire ===
History repeated itself on January 28, 2000 when another fire consumed several buildings on Main Street and spread to the city hall. And again, history repeated itself as the town rebuilt. Mayor Judy Hill stated, "A fire like that can destroy a small town, but instead it ignited a community spirit here." In a few days, Jamestown was having town meetings to make plans for the future.

=== Rebuilding town ===
The funeral home in Jamestown was selected as the temporary city office and meeting place. More than 50 people (out of a population of 307 at the time) came to town meetings there and the citizens organized into several committees to begin work.

Today, Jamestown has a new community center with daycare facilities and a downtown activities center with a health clinic, public library, and several businesses.

== Geography ==
According to the United States Census Bureau, the city has a total area of 0.29 square miles (0.75 km^{2}), all land.

== Demographics ==
Historical population
Census	Pop.	Note	%±
1880	101		—
1890	372		268.3%
1900	400		7.5%
1910	462		15.5%
1920	495		7.1%
1930	507		2.4%
1940	490		−3.4%
1950	494		0.8%
1960	422		−14.6%
1970	470		11.4%
1980	440		−6.4%
1990	325		−26.1%
2000	399		22.8%
2010	286		−28.3%
2020	237		−17.1%
U.S. Decennial Census

=== 2020 census ===
The 2020 United States census counted 237 people, 105 households, and 72 families in Jamestown. The population density was 808.9 per square mile (312.3/km^{2}). There were 124 housing units at an average density of 423.2 per square mile (163.4/km^{2}). The racial makeup was 92.41% (219) white or European American (91.56% non-Hispanic white), 0.0% (0) black or African-American, 1.27% (3) Native American or Alaska Native, 0.42% (1) Asian, 0.0% (0) Pacific Islander or Native Hawaiian, 0.0% (0) from other races, and 5.91% (14) from two or more races. Hispanic or Latino of any race was 1.69% (4) of the population.

Of the 105 households, 25.7% had children under the age of 18; 53.3% were married couples living together; 19.0% had a female householder with no spouse or partner present. 29.5% of households consisted of individuals and 11.4% had someone living alone who was 65 years of age or older. The average household size was 2.5 and the average family size was 3.0. The percent of those with a bachelor's degree or higher was estimated to be 11.4% of the population.

20.3% of the population was under the age of 18, 5.5% from 18 to 24, 25.3% from 25 to 44, 24.9% from 45 to 64, and 24.1% who were 65 years of age or older. The median age was 43.8 years. For every 100 females, there were 109.7 males. For every 100 females ages 18 and older, there were 98.9 males.

The 2016–2020 5-year American Community Survey estimates show that the median household income was $63,611 (with a margin of error of +/- $10,377) and the median family income was $66,250 (+/- $15,670). Males had a median income of $27,500 (+/- $12,267) versus $31,667 (+/- $19,980) for females. The median income for those above 16 years old was $30,500 (+/- $10,596). Approximately, 12.5% of families and 13.7% of the population were below the poverty line, including 20.8% of those under the age of 18 and 7.3% of those ages 65 or over.

=== 2010 census ===
As of the census of 2010, there were 286 people, 126 households, and 84 families residing in the city. The population density was 986.2 inhabitants per square mile (380.8/km^{2}). There were 148 housing units at an average density of 510.3 per square mile (197.0/km^{2}). The racial makeup of the city was 97.6% White, 0.7% African American, 0.7% Native American, 0.3% Asian, 0.3% from other races, and 0.3% from two or more races. Hispanic or Latino of any race were 0.7% of the population.

There were 126 households, of which 27.8% had children under the age of 18 living with them, 46.8% were married couples living together, 11.9% had a female householder with no husband present, 7.9% had a male householder with no wife present, and 33.3% were non-families. 29.4% of all households were made up of individuals, and 11.1% had someone living alone who was 65 years of age or older. The average household size was 2.27 and the average family size was 2.71.

The median age in the city was 40.6 years. 22% of residents were under the age of 18; 9.1% were between the ages of 18 and 24; 26.9% were from 25 to 44; 26.5% were from 45 to 64; and 15.4% were 65 years of age or older. The gender makeup of the city was 49.7% male and 50.3% female.

== Economy ==
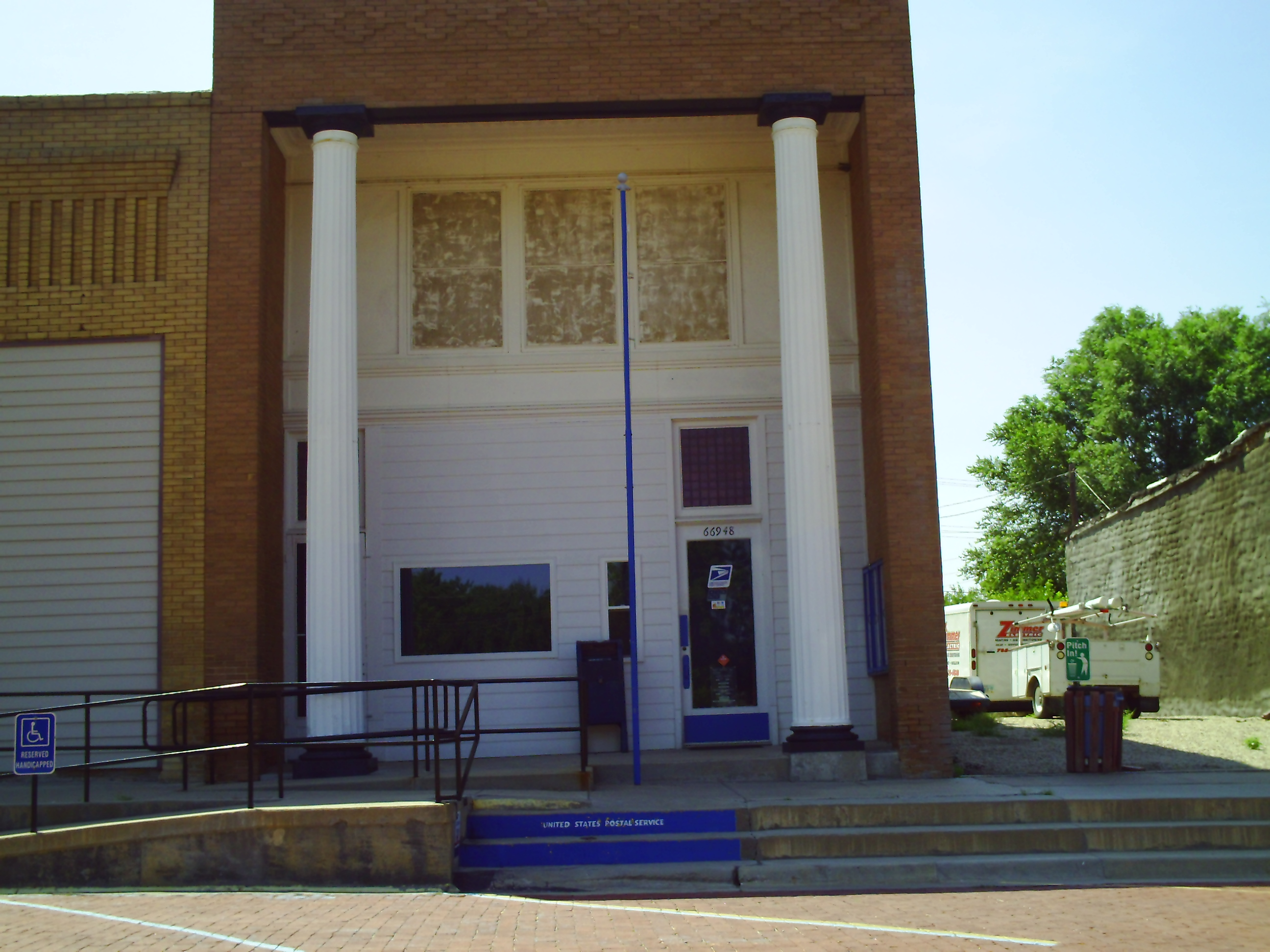
Jamestown United States Post Office, in 2011

Jamestown is mostly a small agricultural community. There is a local bank that services accounts through the area. Through local efforts and federal funding, a community center, activities center, and public library have been added to the downtown area. A large number of residents complete their shopping in nearby Concordia, Kansas.

The opening day of hunting season brings an influx of people who enjoy small bird game hunting. Also, the nearby Jamestown Wildlife Area (commonly called "Jamestown Lake") provides fishing for local anglers seeking small fish such as perch, crappie, and bass.

A weekly newspaper called the Jamestown Settler was published from 1977 until 1983. Other papers were published from time to time, including The Kansas Optimist from 1904 until 1965 and The Quill from 1888–1890.

== Education ==
The community is served by Concordia USD 333 public school district.

In 1911, local residents of Jamestown transferred some property to School District 32 to create the Jamestown Schools. Kansas public schools underwent reorganization and in 1962, the "old" school district 32 entered a Quit Claim Deed and transferred the property to Unified School District 333. The Jamestown School provided classes for grades 1-12 in one building and also maintained a second building for industrial arts classes. The school also kept a playground and athletic field.

Jamestown maintained a public school until the junior high school and high school was closed in 1980. The elementary school was closed in 1983. The student population was always considered small compared to many other area public schools, and in the later years the enrollment fell to an average of between only six and eight students per grade level. Jamestown residents are currently served by Concordia USD 333 public school district.

Records from October 1984 show a Resolution to Transfer the property from USD 333 back to the City of Jamestown. The main building has been demolished and only the gym stands today.

Jamestown High School athletic teams were known as the Jamestown Jayhawks and competed in the Pike Trail League, primarily made up of small local schools in the area. Students participated in 8-man football, volleyball, basketball, and track & field.

== Notable people ==
- Martha Peterson (1916–2006), former president of Barnard College and Beloit College
