= Limestone Creek (Miami Creek tributary) =

Stream in Bates County, Missouri, U.S.

Limestone Creek is a stream in Bates County, Missouri. It is a tributary of Miami Creek.

The stream headwaters are at 38°22′23″N 94°25′18″W and the confluence with the Miami are at 38°17′43″N 94°27′10″W.

Limestone Creek was named for deposits of limestone in the area.

== See also ==
- List of rivers of Missouri
