= Limestone Creek (Solomon River tributary) =

- Location of the mouth of Limestone Creek Limestone Creek (Solomon River tributary) (the United States)

Location
- Country: United States
- State: Kansas
- Counties: Mitchell, Jewell

Physical characteristics
- Source
  - coordinates: 39°50′20″N 98°17′11″W
- Mouth: Solomon River
  - coordinates: 39°29′35″N 98°17′49″W
  - elevation: 1,404 ft (428 m)

Limestone Creek is a river in Mitchell County and Jewell County in the U.S. State of Kansas. Limestone Creek flows into the Solomon River.
