= Jewell, Kansas =

City in Jewell County, Kansas

- City
- Location within Jewell County and Kansas

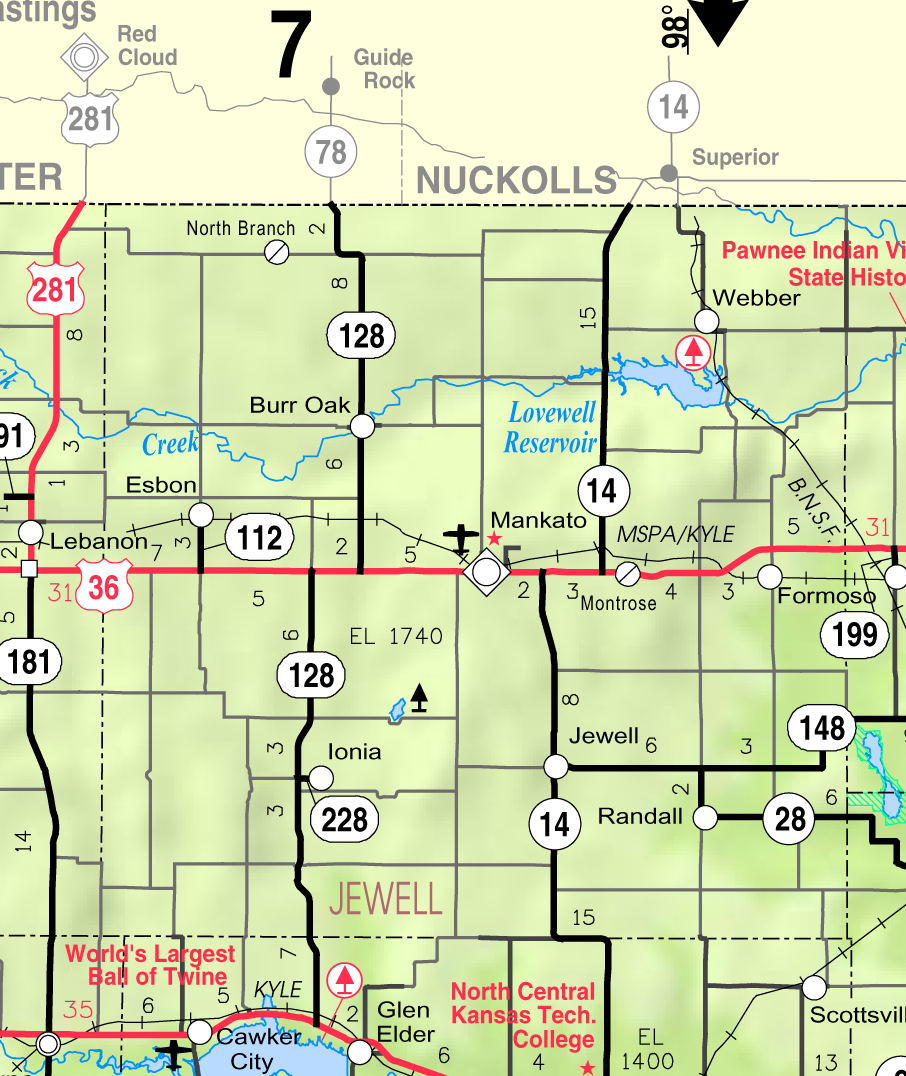
- KDOT map of Jewell County (legend)
- Coordinates: 39°40′18″N 98°09′09″W
- Country: United States
- State: Kansas
- County: Jewell
- Founded: 1870
- Incorporated: 1880
- Named for: Lewis Jewell

Area
  - Total: 0.41 sq mi (1.06 km^{2})
  - Land: 0.41 sq mi (1.06 km^{2})
  - Water: 0 sq mi (0.00 km^{2})
- Elevation: 1,555 ft (474 m)

Population (2020)
  - Total: 370
  - Density: 900/sq mi (350/km^{2})
- Time zone: UTC-6 (CST)
  - Summer (DST): UTC-5 (CDT)
- ZIP Code: 66949
- Area code: 785
- FIPS code: 20-35475
- GNIS ID: 2395470
- Website: jewell.krwa.net

Jewell is a city in Jewell County, Kansas, United States. As of the 2020 census, the population of the city was 370.

== History ==
The City of Jewell began in 1870 as a large sod enclosure called Fort Jewell. Named in honor of Lieutenant-Colonel Lewis R. Jewell, Sixth Kansas Cavalry, who died November 30, 1862, of wounds received in the battle of Cane Hill, Ark. November 28, 1862.

The first post office in Jewell was established in July 1870.

Jewell was incorporated as a city in 1880.

Jewell was located on the Missouri Pacific Railroad.

A new community center was built in 1999 across from the city park; it features a public library, American Legion offices and a four-room hotel.

== Geography ==
According to the United States Census Bureau, the city has a total area of 0.43 square miles (1.11 km^{2}), all land.

== Demographics ==
Historical population
Census	Pop.	Note	%±
1880	372		—
1890	702		88.7%
1900	736		4.8%
1910	839		14.0%
1920	805		−4.1%
1930	707		−12.2%
1940	669		−5.4%
1950	593		−11.4%
1960	582		−1.9%
1970	569		−2.2%
1980	589		3.5%
1990	529		−10.2%
2000	483		−8.7%
2010	432		−10.6%
2020	370		−14.4%
U.S. Decennial Census

=== 2020 census ===
The 2020 United States census counted 370 people, 175 households, and 90 families in Jewell. The population density was 900.2 per square mile (347.6/km^{2}). There were 224 housing units at an average density of 545.0 per square mile (210.4/km^{2}). The racial makeup was 92.43% (342) white or European American (91.89% non-Hispanic white), 0.54% (2) black or African-American, 0.54% (2) Native American or Alaska Native, 0.0% (0) Asian, 0.0% (0) Pacific Islander or Native Hawaiian, 0.81% (3) from other races, and 5.68% (21) from two or more races. Hispanic or Latino of any race was 2.43% (9) of the population.

Of the 175 households, 16.0% had children under the age of 18; 45.1% were married couples living together; 28.0% had a female householder with no spouse or partner present. 45.1% of households consisted of individuals and 31.4% had someone living alone who was 65 years of age or older. The average household size was 1.9 and the average family size was 2.5. The percent of those with a bachelor's degree or higher was estimated to be 12.7% of the population.

19.7% of the population was under the age of 18, 5.7% from 18 to 24, 21.9% from 25 to 44, 24.6% from 45 to 64, and 28.1% who were 65 years of age or older. The median age was 47.7 years. For every 100 females, there were 98.9 males. For every 100 females ages 18 and older, there were 99.3 males.

The 2016–2020 5-year American Community Survey estimates show that the median household income was $37,679 (with a margin of error of +/- $4,925) and the median family income was $48,750 (+/- $10,446). Males had a median income of $27,708 (+/- $2,813) versus $25,357 (+/- $10,087) for females. The median income for those above 16 years old was $26,518 (+/- $1,702). Approximately, 13.0% of families and 19.0% of the population were below the poverty line, including 32.9% of those under the age of 18 and 18.0% of those ages 65 or over.

=== 2010 census ===
As of the census of 2010, there were 432 people, 208 households, and 113 families living in the city. The population density was 1,004.7 inhabitants per square mile (387.9/km^{2}). There were 251 housing units at an average density of 583.7 per square mile (225.4/km^{2}). The racial makeup of the city was 93.8% White, 1.9% Native American, 0.2% Asian, 0.2% from other races, and 3.9% from two or more races. Hispanic or Latino of any race were 5.6% of the population.

There were 208 households, of which 19.7% had children under the age of 18 living with them, 46.6% were married couples living together, 5.3% had a female householder with no husband present, 2.4% had a male householder with no wife present, and 45.7% were non-families. 42.8% of all households were made up of individuals, and 24.1% had someone living alone who was 65 years of age or older. The average household size was 2.08 and the average family size was 2.88.

The median age in the city was 49.2 years. 21.5% of residents were under the age of 18; 6% were between the ages of 18 and 24; 17.1% were from 25 to 44; 29.9% were from 45 to 64; and 25.7% were 65 years of age or older. The gender makeup of the city was 50.9% male and 49.1% female.

== Education ==
The community is served by Rock Hills USD 107 public school district, which was formed in 2006 by the consolidation of White Rock USD 104 and Mankato USD 278.

Randall and Jewell schools were consolidated into Jewell-Randall schools in the 1960s. Prior to unification, the Jewell High School mascot was Jewell Wildcats. The Jewell Wildcats won the following Kansas State High School championships:

- 1967 Boys Track & Field - Class BB
- 1968 Boys Track & Field - Class BB
- 1991 Boys Track & Field - Class 1A
