= Barnard, Kansas =

City in Lincoln County, Kansas

- City
- Location within Lincoln County and Kansas

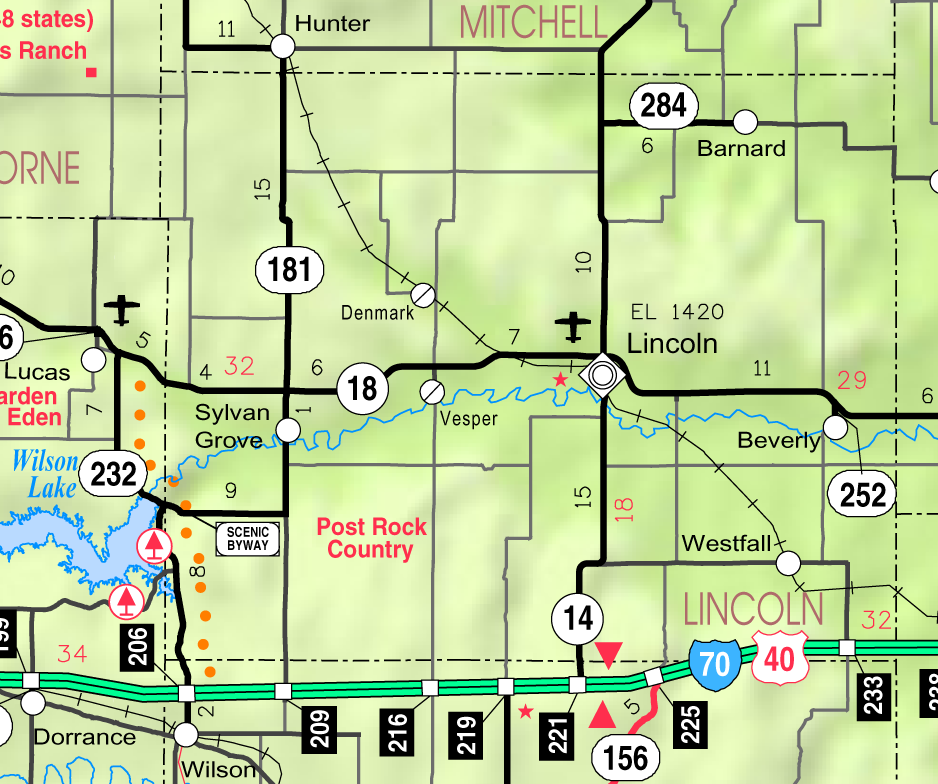
- KDOT map of Lincoln County (legend)
- Coordinates: 39°11′21″N 98°2′35″W
- Country: United States
- State: Kansas
- County: Lincoln
- Founded: 1888
- Incorporated: 1905
- Named for: J.F. Barnard

Area
  - Total: 0.22 sq mi (0.58 km^{2})
  - Land: 0.22 sq mi (0.58 km^{2})
  - Water: 0 sq mi (0.00 km^{2})
- Elevation: 1,316 ft (401 m)

Population (2020)
  - Total: 64
  - Density: 290/sq mi (110/km^{2})
- Time zone: UTC-6 (CST)
  - Summer (DST): UTC-5 (CDT)
- ZIP Code: 67418
- Area code: 785
- FIPS code: 20-04225
- GNIS ID: 472511

Barnard is a city in Lincoln County, Kansas, United States. As of the 2020 census, the population of the city was 64.

== History ==
Barnard was first settled in 1888 when a rail line of the Chicago, Kansas & Western Railroad Company reached the town, and it was incorporated as a city in 1904. Barnard was named for J.F. Barnard, a railroad employee.

The Atchison, Topeka and Santa Fe Railway acquired the C,K & W.R. in 1901. The railroad applied to abandon the 43.38 mile "Minneapolis District" line from Manchester to Barnard in 1983.

== Geography ==
According to the United States Census Bureau, the city has a total area of 0.22 square miles (0.57 km^{2}), all land.

=== Climate ===
The climate in this area is characterized by hot, humid summers and generally mild to cool winters. According to the Köppen Climate Classification system, Barnard has a humid subtropical climate, abbreviated "Cfa" on climate maps.

== Demographics ==
Historical population
Census	Pop.	Note	%±
1910	425		—
1920	359		−15.5%
1930	416		15.9%
1940	306		−26.4%
1950	242		−20.9%
1960	205		−15.3%
1970	190		−7.3%
1980	163		−14.2%
1990	129		−20.9%
2000	123		−4.7%
2010	70		−43.1%
2020	64		−8.6%
U.S. Decennial Census

=== 2020 census ===
The 2020 United States census counted 64 people, 34 households, and 18 families in Barnard. The population density was 287.0 per square mile (110.8/km^{2}). There were 49 housing units at an average density of 219.7 per square mile (84.8/km^{2}). The racial makeup was 85.94% (55) white or European American (85.94% non-Hispanic white), 0.0% (0) black or African-American, 0.0% (0) Native American or Alaska Native, 0.0% (0) Asian, 1.56% (1) Pacific Islander or Native Hawaiian, 0.0% (0) from other races, and 12.5% (8) from two or more races. Hispanic or Latino of any race was 3.12% (2) of the population.

Of the 34 households, 17.6% had children under the age of 18; 41.2% were married couples living together; 26.5% had a female householder with no spouse or partner present. 35.3% of households consisted of individuals and 23.5% had someone living alone who was 65 years of age or older. The average household size was 1.5 and the average family size was 2.4. The percent of those with a bachelor's degree or higher was estimated to be 31.2% of the population.

3.1% of the population was under the age of 18, 10.9% from 18 to 24, 18.8% from 25 to 44, 29.7% from 45 to 64, and 37.5% who were 65 years of age or older. The median age was 60.0 years. For every 100 females, there were 93.9 males. For every 100 females ages 18 and older, there were 100.0 males.

The 2016–2020 5-year American Community Survey estimates show that the median household income was $50,313 (with a margin of error of +/- $20,576) and the median family income was $61,875 (+/- $44,371). Males had a median income of $38,750 (+/- $31,736) versus $12,321 (+/- $11,401) for females. The median income for those above 16 years old was $23,750 (+/- $11,947). Approximately, 7.1% of families and 5.5% of the population were below the poverty line, including 100.0% of those under the age of 18 and 0.0% of those ages 65 or over.

=== 2010 census ===
As of the census of 2010, there were 70 people, 43 households, and 16 families residing in the city. The population density was 318.2 inhabitants per square mile (122.9/km^{2}). There were 71 housing units at an average density of 322.7 per square mile (124.6/km^{2}). The racial makeup of the city was 100.0% White.

There were 43 households, of which 9.3% had children under the age of 18 living with them, 27.9% were married couples living together, 7.0% had a female householder with no husband present, 2.3% had a male householder with no wife present, and 62.8% were non-families. 55.8% of all households were made up of individuals, and 11.7% had someone living alone who was 65 years of age or older. The average household size was 1.63 and the average family size was 2.38.

The median age in the city was 49.3 years. 10% of residents were under the age of 18; 10.1% were between the ages of 18 and 24; 15.8% were from 25 to 44; 45.6% were from 45 to 64; and 18.6% were 65 years of age or older. The gender makeup of the city was 60.0% male and 40.0% female.

== Economy ==
The only businesses or services remaining in Barnard are a post office and a small grocery.

== Education ==
The community is served by Lincoln USD 298 public school district.

Barnard schools were closed through school unification in 1966. The Barnard High School team name was "Cardinals".
