= Randall, Kansas =

City in Jewell County, Kansas

- City
- Location within Jewell County and Kansas

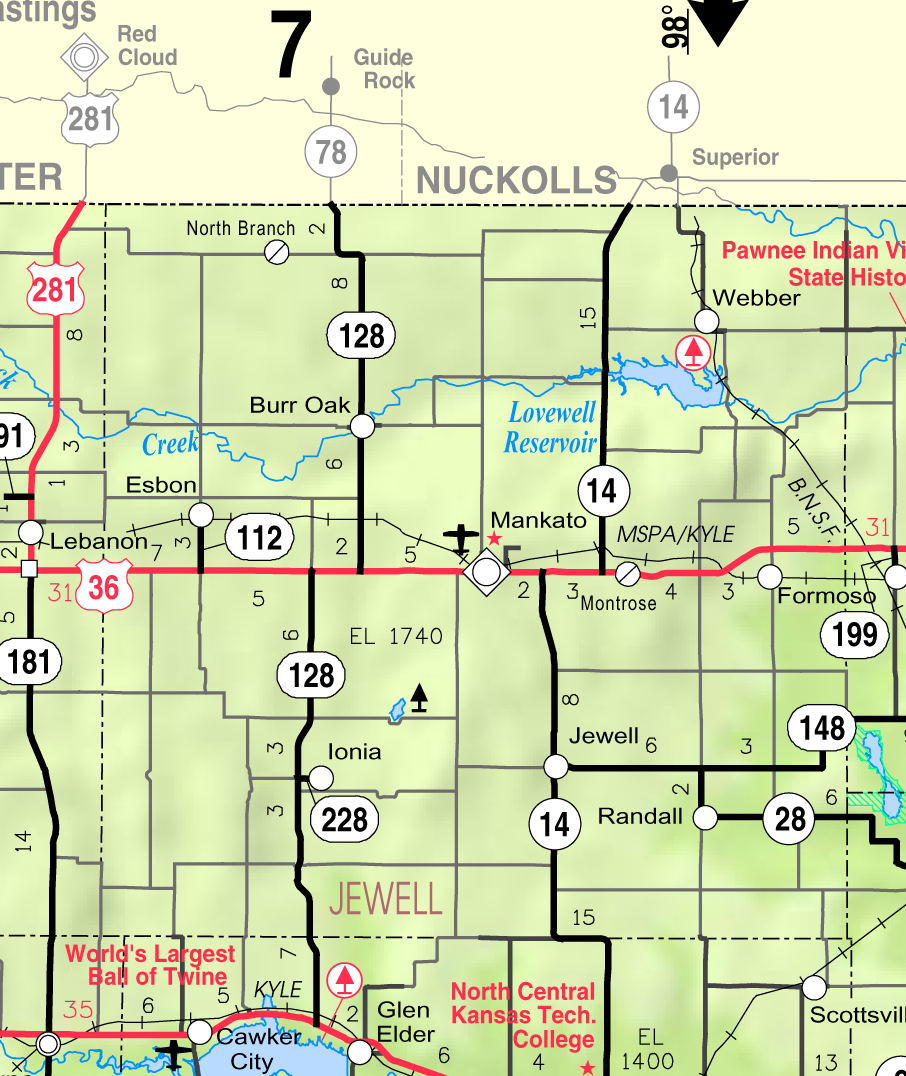
- KDOT map of Jewell County (legend)
- Coordinates: 39°38′30″N 98°02′44″W
- Country: United States
- State: Kansas
- County: Jewell
- Founded: 1870s
- Platted: 1870
- Incorporated: 1887
- Named for: Edward Randall

Area
  - Total: 0.17 sq mi (0.45 km^{2})
  - Land: 0.17 sq mi (0.45 km^{2})
  - Water: 0 sq mi (0.00 km^{2})
- Elevation: 1,453 ft (443 m)

Population (2020)
  - Total: 79
  - Density: 450/sq mi (180/km^{2})
- Time zone: UTC-6 (CST)
  - Summer (DST): UTC-5 (CDT)
- ZIP Code: 66963
- Area code: 785
- FIPS code: 20-58450
- GNIS ID: 2396315

Randall is a city in Jewell County, Kansas, United States. As of the 2020 census, the population of the city was 79.

== History ==
Randall was originally called Vicksburg, and under the latter name laid out in 1870. It was renamed Randall in 1882. The community was named for Edward Randall, an original owner of the site.

== Geography ==
According to the United States Census Bureau, the city has a total area of 0.18 square miles (0.47 km^{2}), all land.

== Demographics ==
Historical population
Census	Pop.	Note	%±
1890	239		—
1900	268		12.1%
1910	325		21.3%
1920	304		−6.5%
1930	262		−13.8%
1940	281		7.3%
1950	240		−14.6%
1960	201		−16.2%
1970	195		−3.0%
1980	154		−21.0%
1990	96		−37.7%
2000	90		−6.2%
2010	65		−27.8%
2020	79		21.5%
U.S. Decennial Census

=== 2020 census ===
The 2020 United States census counted 79 people, 38 households, and 16 families in Randall. The population density was 454.0 per square mile (175.3/km^{2}). There were 50 housing units at an average density of 287.4 per square mile (110.9/km^{2}). The racial makeup was 98.73% (78) white or European American (96.2% non-Hispanic white), 0.0% (0) black or African-American, 1.27% (1) Native American or Alaska Native, 0.0% (0) Asian, 0.0% (0) Pacific Islander or Native Hawaiian, 0.0% (0) from other races, and 0.0% (0) from two or more races. Hispanic or Latino of any race was 2.53% (2) of the population.

Of the 38 households, 23.7% had children under the age of 18; 34.2% were married couples living together; 26.3% had a female householder with no spouse or partner present. 50.0% of households consisted of individuals and 28.9% had someone living alone who was 65 years of age or older. The average household size was 2.6 and the average family size was 3.2. The percent of those with a bachelor's degree or higher was estimated to be 32.9% of the population.

25.3% of the population was under the age of 18, 6.3% from 18 to 24, 27.8% from 25 to 44, 22.8% from 45 to 64, and 17.7% who were 65 years of age or older. The median age was 34.5 years. For every 100 females, there were 113.5 males. For every 100 females ages 18 and older, there were 90.3 males.

The 2016–2020 5-year American Community Survey estimates show that the median household income was $39,375 (with a margin of error of +/- $17,084) and the median family income was $45,625 (+/- $28,576). Males had a median income of $41,103 (+/- $6,387). The median income for those above 16 years old was $31,500 (+/- $18,957). Approximately, 38.3% of families and 42.4% of the population were below the poverty line, including 69.6% of those under the age of 18 and 0.0% of those ages 65 or over.

=== 2010 census ===
As of the census of 2010, there were 65 people, 34 households, and 20 families living in the city. The population density was 361.1 inhabitants per square mile (139.4/km^{2}). There were 65 housing units at an average density of 361.1 per square mile (139.4/km^{2}). The racial makeup of the city was 96.9% White, 1.5% African American, and 1.5% from two or more races. Hispanic or Latino of any race were 3.1% of the population.

There were 34 households, of which 20.6% had children under the age of 18 living with them, 55.9% were married couples living together, 2.9% had a female householder with no husband present, and 41.2% were non-families. 41.2% of all households were made up of individuals, and 32.3% had someone living alone who was 65 years of age or older. The average household size was 1.91 and the average family size was 2.55.

The median age in the city was 57.8 years. 16.9% of residents were under the age of 18; 1.5% were between the ages of 18 and 24; 16.9% were from 25 to 44; 30.8% were from 45 to 64; and 33.8% were 65 years of age or older. The gender makeup of the city was 43.1% male and 56.9% female.

== Education ==
The community is served by Beloit USD 273 public school district, which operates Randall Elementary School, then go onwards to Beloit Junior-Senior High School.

Randall and Jewell schools were consolidated into Jewell-Randall schools in the 1960s. Prior to unification, the Randall High School mascot was Randall Panthers. In 2009 Beloit USD had absorbed some territory from USD 279 Jewell due to that district's dissolution.
