= Atlantic and Pacific Highway =

Auto trail connecting New York City with Los Angeles

The Atlantic and Pacific Highway was an auto trail in the United States, essentially eliminated by the U.S. Highway system in the late 1920s. It connected New York City on the Atlantic Ocean with Los Angeles on the Pacific Ocean.

== Routing ==
Using the present road names, the highway approximately used the following route:

- U.S. Route 1, New York City to Philadelphia
- U.S. Route 13, Philadelphia to Wilmington
- U.S. Route 40, Wilmington to Baltimore
- U.S. Route 1, Baltimore to Washington, D.C.
- U.S. Route 29 and State Route 229, Washington, D.C. to Culpeper
- U.S. Route 15 and State Route 231, Culpeper to Charlottesville
- U.S. Route 250, Charlottesville to Staunton
- State Route 42, State Route 39, and U.S. Route 220, Staunton to Covington
- U.S. Route 60, Covington to Lewisburg
- WV Route 63 and WV Route 3, Lewisburg to Beckley
- WV Route 16, Beckley to Kanawha Falls
- U.S. Route 60, Kanawha Falls to Huntington
- U.S. Route 52, Huntington to Cincinnati
- State Road 56, State Road 64, and Illinois Route 15, Bedford to St. Louis
- U.S. Route 50, St. Louis to Jefferson City
- U.S. Route 54, Jefferson City to Vaughn
- U.S. Route 60, Interstate 10, and California State Route 60, Vaughn to Los Angeles
