= White Rock Creek (Kansas) =

Strean in Kansas, U.S.

- Location of the mouth of White Rock Creek
- Native name: Riviere Amiable (French)

Location
- Country: United States
- State: Kansas

Physical characteristics
- Source
  - location: Republic County, Kansas
  - coordinates: 39°57′19″N 98°40′01″W
- Mouth: Republican River
  - location: Jewell County, Kansas
  - coordinates: 39°55′10″N 97°51′21″W
  - elevation: 1,473 ft (449 m)

White Rock Creek is a river in the central Great Plains of North America. A tributary of the Republican River, it flows through northern Kansas.

== History ==
The mouth of White Rock Creek was the location where a group of six buffalo hunters from Waterville, Kansas were killed by Cheyenne Dog Soldiers in May 1869. Also in May of 1869, the Excelsior Colony from New York, took claims along White Rock Creek and built a blockhouse north of the present town of Mankato. By June 1869, all of the settlers had left because of conflicts with the Indians.

== See also ==
- List of rivers of Kansas
