= National Register of Historic Places listings in Mitchell County, Kansas =

Location of Mitchell County in Kansas

This is a list of the National Register of Historic Places listings in Mitchell County, Kansas.

This is intended to be a complete list of the properties and districts on the National Register of Historic Places in Mitchell County, Kansas, United States. The locations of National Register properties and districts for which the latitude and longitude coordinates are included below, may be seen in a map.

There are 13 properties and districts listed on the National Register in the county.

This National Park Service list is complete through NPS recent listings posted September 4, 2026.

== Current listings ==
| | Name on the Register | Image | Date listed | Location | City or town | Description |
|---|---|---|---|---|---|---|
| 1 | Antelope Creek Masonry Arch Bridge | Antelope Creek Masonry Arch Bridge | July 25, 2014 (#14000437) | Mile 1000 on County Road 210; 39°22′01″N 98°17′02″W | Tipton | |
| 2 | Brown's Creek Tributary Masonry Arch Bridge | Brown's Creek Tributary Masonry Arch Bridge | July 25, 2014 (#14000438) | Mile 2300 on County Road B 39°33′13″N 98°14′32″W | Glen Elder | |
| 3 | Cather Farm | Cather Farm | June 27, 2007 (#07000611) | 4 miles north of the junction of K-15 and K-24; 39°32′27″N 98°06′55″W | Beloit | |
| 4 | Abram Click Farmstead | Abram Click Farmstead | June 25, 2013 (#13000432) | 2030 Independence Avenue; 39°28′51″N 98°06′59″W | Beloit | |
| 5 | E. W. Norris Service Station | E. W. Norris Service Station | December 12, 1976 (#76000832) | Market and Main Sts. 39°29′56″N 98°18′24″W | Glen Elder | |
| 6 | F. H. Hart House | F. H. Hart House | January 29, 1973 (#73000769) | 304 E. Main St. 39°27′31″N 98°06′26″W | Beloit | |
| 7 | Mitchell County Courthouse | Mitchell County Courthouse | November 23, 1977 (#77000591) | Main St. and Hersey Ave. 39°27′31″N 98°06′30″W | Beloit | |
| 8 | North Rock Creek Masonry Arch Bridge | North Rock Creek Masonry Arch Bridge | July 25, 2014 (#14000439) | V Rd., .4 mi. E. of 190th Rd. 39°15′48″N 98°18′50″W | Hunter | |
| 9 | Old Cawker City Library | Old Cawker City Library | March 7, 1973 (#73000770) | 7th and Lake Sts. 39°30′39″N 98°25′58″W | Cawker City | |
| 10 | C. A. Perdue House | C. A. Perdue House | December 12, 1976 (#76000831) | 422 W. 8th St. 39°28′01″N 98°06′56″W | Beloit | |
| 11 | Porter Hotel | Porter Hotel | July 23, 2004 (#04000725) | 209 E. Main St. 39°27′33″N 98°06′30″W | Beloit | |
| 12 | St. John the Baptist Catholic Church | St. John the Baptist Catholic Church | April 14, 1975 (#75000717) | 701 E. Court St. 39°27′31″N 98°06′09″W | Beloit | |
| 13 | Wisconsin Street Historic District | Wisconsin Street Historic District | June 11, 1986 (#86001324) | 700 block of Wisconsin St. 39°30′37″N 98°25′58″W | Cawker City | |

== See also ==
- List of National Historic Landmarks in Kansas
- National Register of Historic Places listings in Kansas
