= Solomon River =

River in Kansas, United States

Solomon River Kiicawiicaku, Mahkineohe, Nepaholla, Rivere de Soucis, Wisgapalla
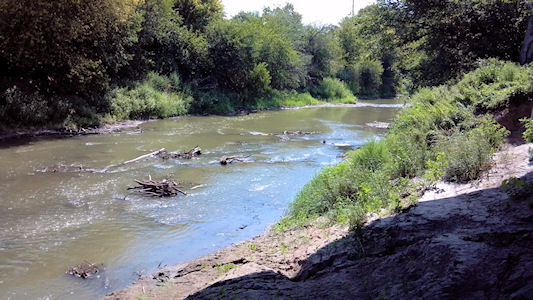
- Solomon River at Beloit, Kansas

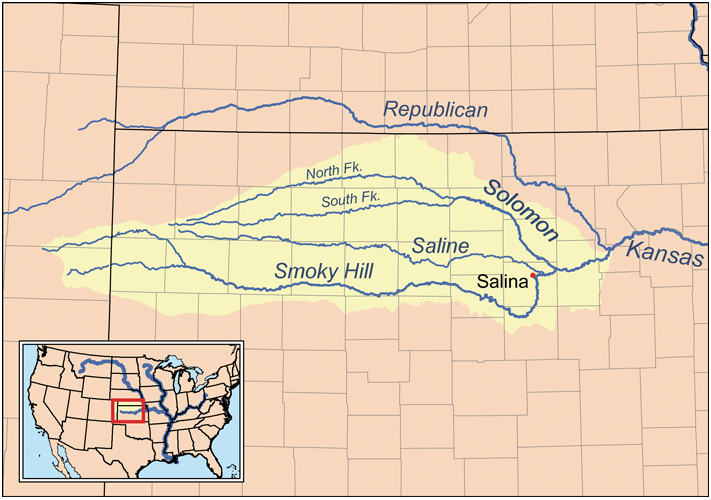
- Map of the Smoky Hill drainage basin including the Solomon River

Location
- Country: United States
- State: Kansas

Physical characteristics
- Source confluence: Waconda Lake
  - location: Cawker City, Kansas
  - coordinates: 39°28′23″N 98°26′00″W
  - elevation: 1,453 ft (443 m)
- Mouth: Smoky Hill River
  - location: Solomon, Kansas
  - coordinates: 38°54′13″N 97°22′09″W
  - elevation: 1,142 ft (348 m)
- Length: 184 mi (296 km)
- Basin size: 6,835 sq mi (17,700 km^{2})
- Discharge
  - location: USGS 06876900 at Niles, KS
  - average: 555 cu ft/s (15.7 m^{3}/s)
  - minimum: 1 cu ft/s (0.028 m^{3}/s)
  - maximum: 157,000 cu ft/s (4,400 m^{3}/s)

Basin features
- Tributaries
  - left: North Fork Solomon River
  - right: South Fork Solomon River
- Watersheds: Solomon-Smoky Hill-Kansas-Missouri-Mississippi

The Solomon River, often referred to as the "Solomon Fork", is a 184-mile-long (296 km) river in the central Great Plains of North America. The entire length of the river lies in the U.S. state of Kansas. It is a tributary of the Smoky Hill River.

== Names ==
The Native name for the river was Nepaholla, meaning "Water on the Hill" in reference to Waconda Spring which was located in the river valley. In 1744, French explorers named the river Salmon, later corrupted into Solomon, after Edme Gatien de Salmon, a prominent colonial official of French Louisiana at the time. Other names for the river include Mahkineohe, Riviere de Soucis, Solomons Creek, Wiskapalla River, and Solomons Fork.

== Geography ==
The Solomon River is formed by the confluence of the North Fork Solomon River and South Fork Solomon River at Waconda Lake in northwestern Mitchell County, Kansas. Both forks originate in the High Plains of northwestern Kansas. From Waconda Lake, the Solomon flows southeast for 184 miles (296 km) through the Smoky Hills region and joins the Smoky Hill River immediately south of Solomon, Kansas in western Dickinson County.

The Solomon River drainage basin covers an area of 6,835 square miles (17,703 km^{2}). Via the Smoky Hill, Kansas, and Missouri Rivers, it is part of the Mississippi River watershed.

Kansas towns along the Solomon River include Cawker City, Beloit, and Minneapolis.

== History ==
Before American colonization, the Solomon River valley was a popular hunting and trapping area for the Plains Indians. Tribes that camped along the river included the Pawnee, Cheyenne, and Kansa. French explorer Etienne Venyard de Bourgmont visited the area in 1712, claiming it for France. Other French explorers returned in 1744 to survey the area and gave the river its name. After the French and Indian War, it became part of the Viceroyalty of New Spain. With the Louisiana Purchase in 1803, the region became part of the territory of the United States. In 1806, explorer Zebulon Pike led an expedition through the area, camping on the Solomon's North Fork near the site of modern Downs, Kansas. American settlers began to arrive in the 1850s, hunters and trappers initially followed by homesteaders. In 1861, the area became part of the state of Kansas.

In 1969, the U.S. Bureau of Reclamation finished construction of Glen Elder Dam, a dam for flood control immediately above Glen Elder, Kansas on the Solomon River, creating Waconda Lake.

== In literature ==
- Willa Cather mentioned the Solomon River in her 1901 short story El Dorado: A Kansas Recessional. Her description says, "it is one of the most futile little streams under the sun, and never gets anywhere. Its sluggish current splits among the sand bars and buries itself in the mud until it literally dries up from weariness and ennui, without ever reaching anything."

== See also ==
- List of Kansas rivers
- South Fork Solomon River
- Smoky Hill River
- Smoky Hills
- Waconda Lake

== External articles ==
- Donald O. Whittemore, Determination of Waconda Lake Releases Needed for Diluting Saline Water in the Solomon River at Beloit for Municipal Water Supply. A Report Prepared for the Kansas Department of Agriculture, Division of Water Resources and Kansas Department of Health and Environment, Kansas Geological Survey. Open-File Report 2003-49.
- Mandrak, Nicholas E., Changes in fish assemblages, Solomon River basin, Kansas: habitat alterations, extirpations, and introductions. Transactions of the Kansas Academy of Science, October 1, 2002
- Martha B. Caldwell, Exploring the Solomon River Valley in 1869.
- Theo. H. Scheffer, Old Fort Solomon at Lindsey.
