= Tipton, Kansas =

City in Mitchell County, Kansas

- City
- Location within Mitchell County and Kansas

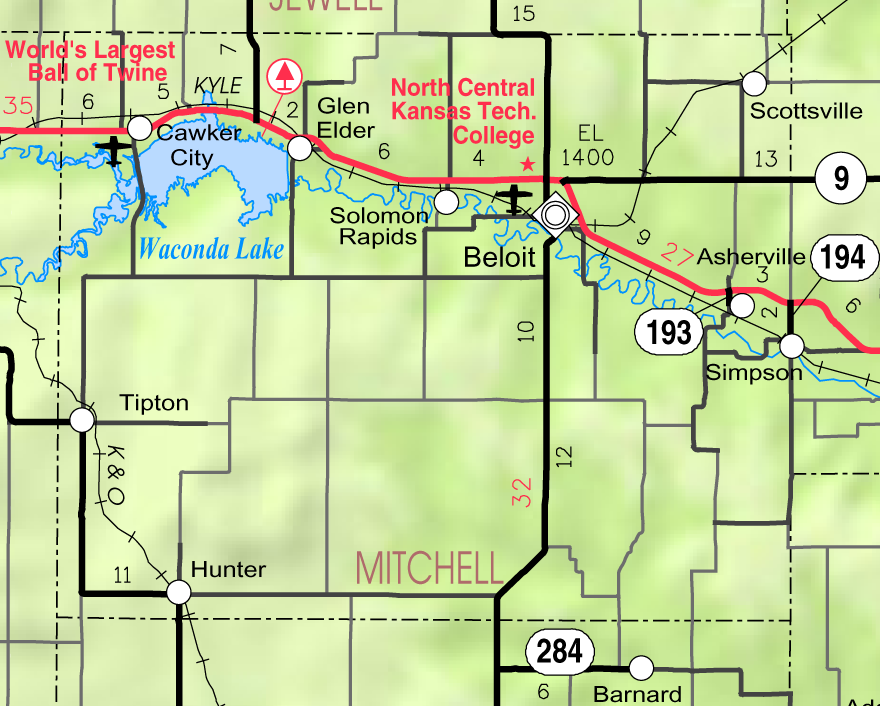
- KDOT map of Mitchell County (legend)
- Coordinates: 39°20′22″N 98°28′15″W
- Country: United States
- State: Kansas
- County: Mitchell
- Founded: 1872
- Incorporated: 1916
- Named for: Tipton, Iowa

Area
  - Total: 0.25 sq mi (0.65 km^{2})
  - Land: 0.25 sq mi (0.65 km^{2})
  - Water: 0 sq mi (0.00 km^{2})
- Elevation: 1,595 ft (486 m)

Population (2020)
  - Total: 193
  - Density: 770/sq mi (300/km^{2})
- Time zone: UTC-6 (CST)
  - Summer (DST): UTC-5 (CDT)
- ZIP Code: 67485
- Area code: 785
- FIPS code: 20-70675
- GNIS ID: 2397031
- Website: tiptonkansas.com

Tipton is a city in Mitchell County, Kansas, United States. As of the 2020 census, the population of the city was 193.

== History ==
Tipton was originally called Pittsburg, and under the latter name was founded in 1872. When it was later realized that another Pittsburg existed in Kansas, the name was changed to Tipton after Tipton, Iowa, the former home of a local resident.

== Geography ==
According to the United States Census Bureau, the city has a total area of 0.26 square miles (0.67 km^{2}), all of it land.

== Demographics ==
Historical population
Census	Pop.	Note	%±
1920	230		—
1930	294		27.8%
1940	248		−15.6%
1950	246		−0.8%
1960	252		2.4%
1970	315		25.0%
1980	321		1.9%
1990	267		−16.8%
2000	243		−9.0%
2010	210		−13.6%
2020	193		−8.1%
U.S. Decennial Census

=== 2010 census ===
As of the census of 2010, there were 210 people, 98 households, and 57 families residing in the city. The population density was 807.7 inhabitants per square mile (311.9/km^{2}). There were 116 housing units at an average density of 446.2 per square mile (172.3/km^{2}). The racial makeup of the city was 98.1% White and 1.9% Asian.

There were 98 households, of which 21.4% had children under the age of 18 living with them, 53.1% were married couples living together, 1.0% had a female householder with no husband present, 4.1% had a male householder with no wife present, and 41.8% were non-families. 40.8% of all households were made up of individuals, and 16.3% had someone living alone who was 65 years of age or older. The average household size was 2.14 and the average family size was 2.88.

The median age in the city was 47 years. 24.8% of residents were under the age of 18; 3.3% were between the ages of 18 and 24; 18.6% were from 25 to 44; 29% were from 45 to 64; and 24.3% were 65 years of age or older. The gender makeup of the city was 54.8% male and 45.2% female.

=== 2000 census ===
As of the census of 2000, there were 243 people, 108 households, and 69 families residing in the city. The population density was 959.5 inhabitants per square mile (370.5/km^{2}). There were 118 housing units at an average density of 465.9 per square mile (179.9/km^{2}). The racial makeup of the city was 99.59% White, 0.41% from other races. Hispanic or Latino of any race were 0.41% of the population.

There were 108 households, out of which 27.8% had children under the age of 18 living with them, 58.3% were married couples living together, 4.6% had a female householder with no husband present, and 36.1% were non-families. 34.3% of all households were made up of individuals, and 20.4% had someone living alone who was 65 years of age or older. The average household size was 2.25 and the average family size was 2.91.

In the city, the population was spread out, with 23.0% under the age of 18, 3.3% from 18 to 24, 21.8% from 25 to 44, 25.9% from 45 to 64, and 25.9% who were 65 years of age or older. The median age was 46 years. For every 100 females, there were 92.9 males. For every 100 females age 18 and over, there were 101.1 males.

The median income for a household in the city was $33,750, and the median income for a family was $45,938. Males had a median income of $30,500 versus $14,375 for females. The per capita income for the city was $17,637. About 7.6% of families and 11.4% of the population were below the poverty line, including 14.8% of those under the age of eighteen and 12.8% of those 65 or over.

== Economy ==
The Great Plains Manufacturing Tipton Tillage Implement Plant, a manufacturing facility, is located in Tipton.

== Education ==
The community is served by Waconda USD 272 public school district. It operates two schools: Lakeside Elementary School in Cawker City and Lakeside High School in Downs.

Previously it operated Tipton Elementary School and Tipton Junior High School.

Tipton Catholic High School is located in the community.

== See also ==
- Meades Ranch Triangulation Station, the geodetic base point for the North American Datum of 1927 (NAD 27), which was used as a reference point until 1989.
- Waconda Lake and Glen Elder State Park.
