= Glen Elder =

Glen Elder may refer:

- Glen Elder, Kansas, a small city
- Glen Elder Dam, impounding Waconda Lake, near Glen Elder, Kansas
- Glen Elder (sociologist)
