= Alrich =

Alrich is a surname. Notable people with the surname include:

- Dora Alrich (1881–1971), German actress
- Emma B. Alrich (1845–1925), American journalist, writer and educator

== See also ==
- Alrich Nicolas (born 1956), German foreign minister
