= TCHS =

TCHS may refer to:

- Tri-Cities High School in East Point, Georgia
- Tates Creek High School in Lexington, Kentucky
- Temescal Canyon High School in Lake Elsinore, California
- Temple City High School in Temple City, California
- Texas City High School in Texas City, Texas
- The Chinese High School (Singapore)
- The Colony High School in The Colony, Texas
- Timber Creek High School in Orlando, Florida
- Timber Creek High School in Fort Worth, Texas
- Tipton Catholic High School in Tipton, Kansas
- Topcoder High School Tournaments, computer programming competition hosted by Topcoder
- Treasure Coast High School, in Port St. Lucie, Florida
- Trinity Christian High School (disambiguation), multiple schools
- Tuscaloosa County High School in Northport, Alabama
- Traverse City High School, a former high school in Traverse City, Michigan
- Trinity Catholic High School in Woodford Green, United Kingdom
- Tyler Consolidated High School in Sistersville, West Virginia
- Tuba City High School in Tuba City, Arizona
