= North Fork Solomon River =

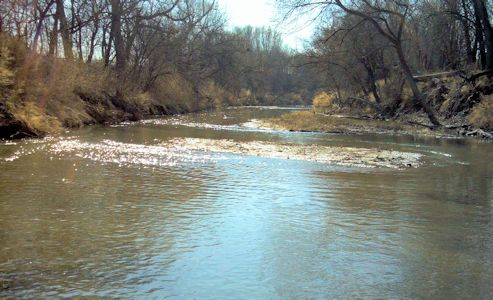
- North Fork Solomon River at Portis, Kansas

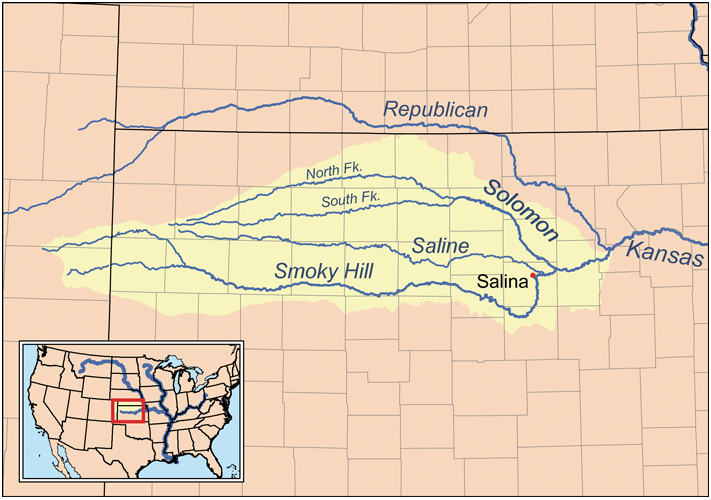
- Map of the Smoky Hill drainage basin including the North Fork Solomon River

Location
- Country: United States
- State: Kansas

Physical characteristics
- Source
  - location: Thomas County, Kansas
  - coordinates: 39°16′52″N 101°16′55″W
  - elevation: 3,362 ft (1,025 m)
- Mouth: Waconda Lake
  - location: Cawker City, Kansas
  - coordinates: 39°28′23″N 98°26′00″W
  - elevation: 1,453 ft (443 m)
- Length: 287 mi (462 km)
- Discharge
  - location: USGS 06872500 at Portis, KS
  - average: 121 cu ft/s (3.4 m^{3}/s)
  - minimum: 0 cu ft/s (0 m^{3}/s)
  - maximum: 32,300 cu ft/s (910 m^{3}/s)

Basin features
- Watersheds: North Fork Solomon-Solomon-Smoky Hill-Kansas-Missouri-Mississippi

The North Fork Solomon River is a river in the central Great Plains of North America. Its entire 287-mile (462 km) length lies within the U.S. state of Kansas. It is a tributary of the Solomon River.

== Geography ==
The North Fork Solomon River originates in the High Plains of northwest Kansas. Its source lies in west-central Thomas County roughly 8 miles (13 km) southeast of Brewster, Kansas. From there, it flows generally east-northeast into the Smoky Hills region of north-central Kansas. Southeast of Phillipsburg, Kansas, the river joins its tributary Bow Creek to feed Kirwin Reservoir. From the reservoir's dam, the river flows east, then turns southeast near Gaylord, Kansas. Immediately south of Cawker City in northwestern Mitchell County, the North Fork joins the South Fork Solomon River to feed Waconda Lake.

== History ==
In 1955, the U.S. Bureau of Reclamation completed a dam on the river immediately south of Kirwin, Kansas for flood control, creating Kirwin Reservoir.

== See also ==
- List of rivers of Kansas
