= Biggest ball of twine =

Title of multiple roadside attractions

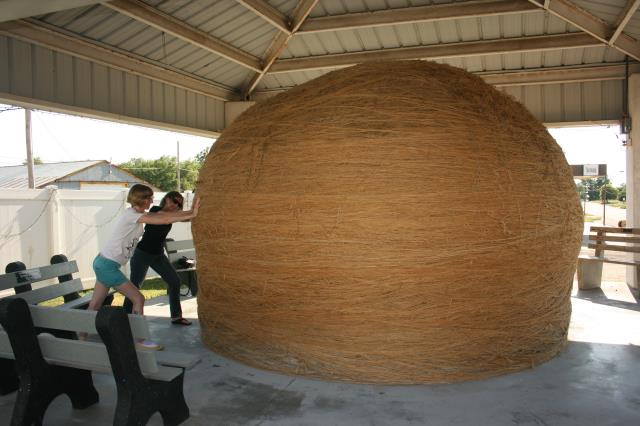
Largest community-rolled ball of twine, located in Cawker City, Kansas (2013)

There are multiple claims to the world's biggest ball of twine record, all within the United States. As of 2014, the ball of twine with the largest circumference is located in Cawker City, Kansas, measured at 8.06 feet (2.46 m) in diameter and 10.83 feet (3.30 m) in height.

== Largest ball of sisal twine built by a community ==
In Cawker City, Kansas, Frank Stoeber created a ball that contained 1.6 million feet (490,000 m) of twine and had reached an 11-foot-diameter (3.4 m) when he died in 1974. Cawker City built an open-air gazebo over Stoeber's ball where every August a "Twine-a-thon" is held and more twine is added to the ball. By 2006, the twine ball had reached 17,886 pounds (8,111 kg, 8.9 US tons), a circumference of 40 feet (12 m), and a length of 7,801,766 feet (2,377.978 km; 1,477.6072 mi). In 2013, its weight was estimated at 19,973 pounds. As of August 2014, the ball measured 41.42 feet (12.62 m) in circumference, 8.06 feet (2.46 m) in diameter, and 10.83 feet (3.30 m) in height and was still growing. In March 2025, the sign at the location shows that the twine ball has reached 46 feet in circumference, making it approximately 14.6 feet in diameter, with a twine length of 8,507,430 feet weighing over 27000 pounds. Visitors can go to the local city hall and acquire twine to add to the ball during daytime hours.

== Largest ball of sisal twine built by a single person ==
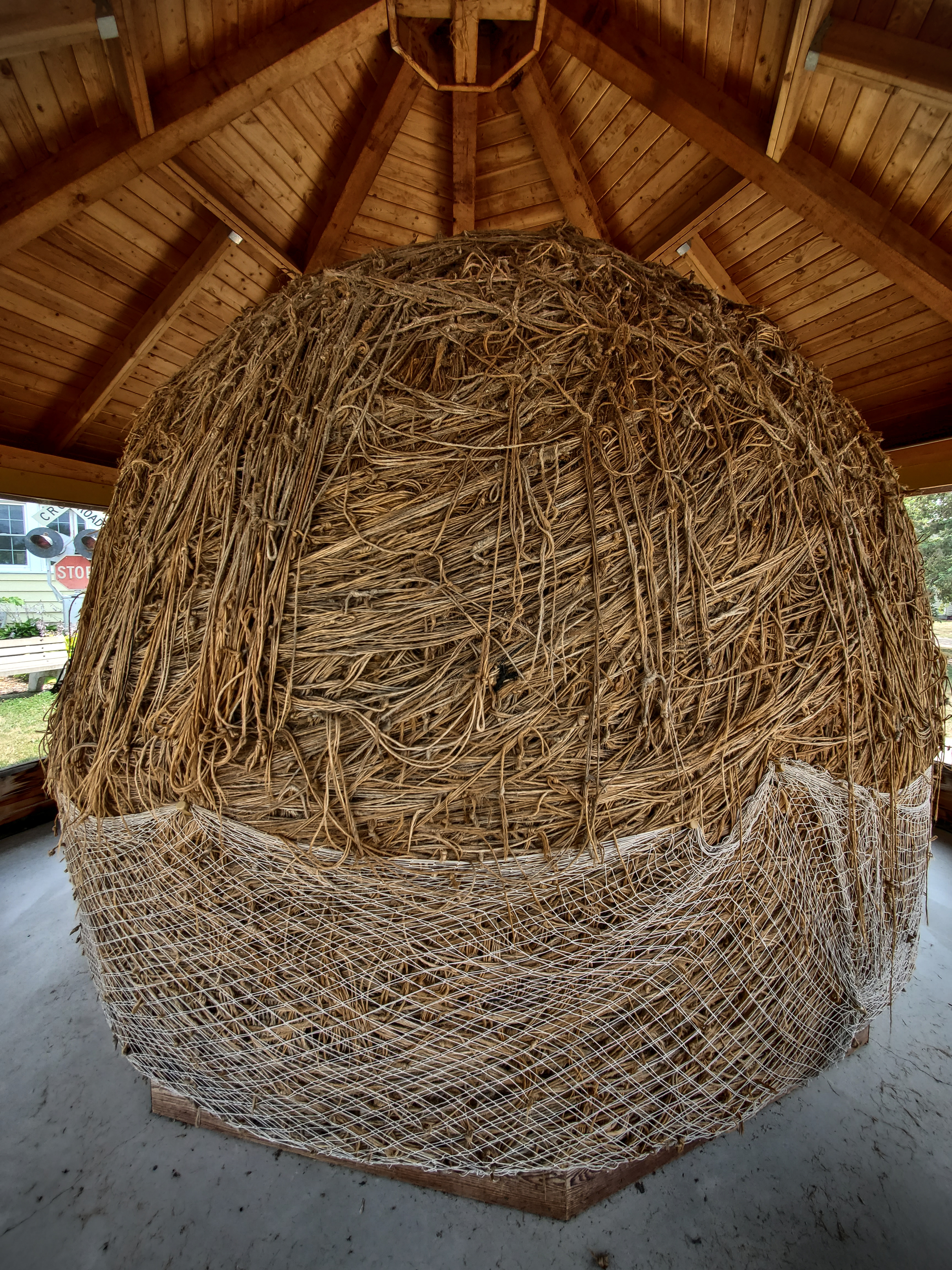
Twine ball in Darwin, Minnesota (2021)

Darwin, Minnesota, is the home of a ball of baler twine rolled by Francis A. Johnson. It is 12 feet (3.7 m) in diameter and weighs 17,400 pounds (7,900 kg; 8.7 short tons). Johnson began rolling the twine in March 1950, and wrapped it for four hours daily for 29 years. It is currently housed in an enclosed gazebo across from the town park on Main Street at (45.096332°N 94.410276°W) to prevent the public from touching it. The town celebrates "Twine Ball Day" on the second Saturday in August every year. An adjacent volunteer-run, free to visit museum and gift shop has information on the history of the ball, as well as a variety of souvenirs for sale. It was the long-standing holder of the "biggest ball of twine" title in the Guinness Book of World Records, holding the title from its completion in 1979 until 1994, and was referenced by "Weird Al" Yankovic in his 1989 song "The Biggest Ball of Twine in Minnesota."

== Heaviest twine ball ==
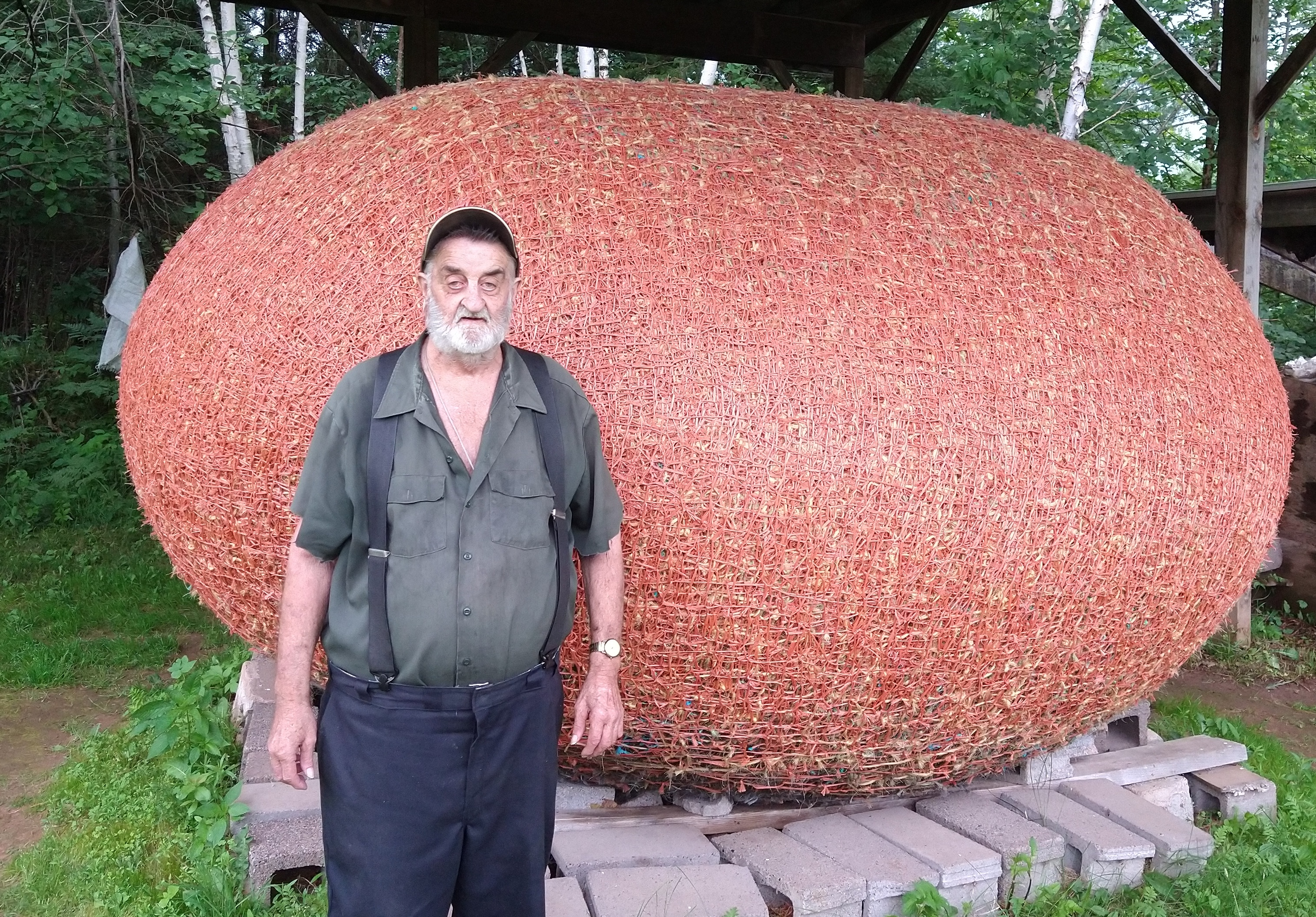
Twine ball in Lake Nebagamon, Wisconsin (2022) with creator James Frank Kotera

In Lake Nebagamon, Wisconsin, James Frank Kotera created the heaviest ball of twine ever built. Kotera, known by his initials "JFK," started working on the ball in 1979 and continued until his death in January 2023. The weight of the ball, 24,160 pounds (10,960 kg), was estimated by measuring the weight of each bag of twine. During Kotera’s life, the ball was housed in an open-air enclosure in his yard; after his death, a former neighbor organized a fundraiser to relocate it, and in 2024 it was moved to a concrete slab near the Highland Town Hall, where volunteers constructed a shelter to protect it. Kotera also created a smaller companion to the ball, which he nicknamed "Junior", that was made of string.

== Largest nylon twine ball ==
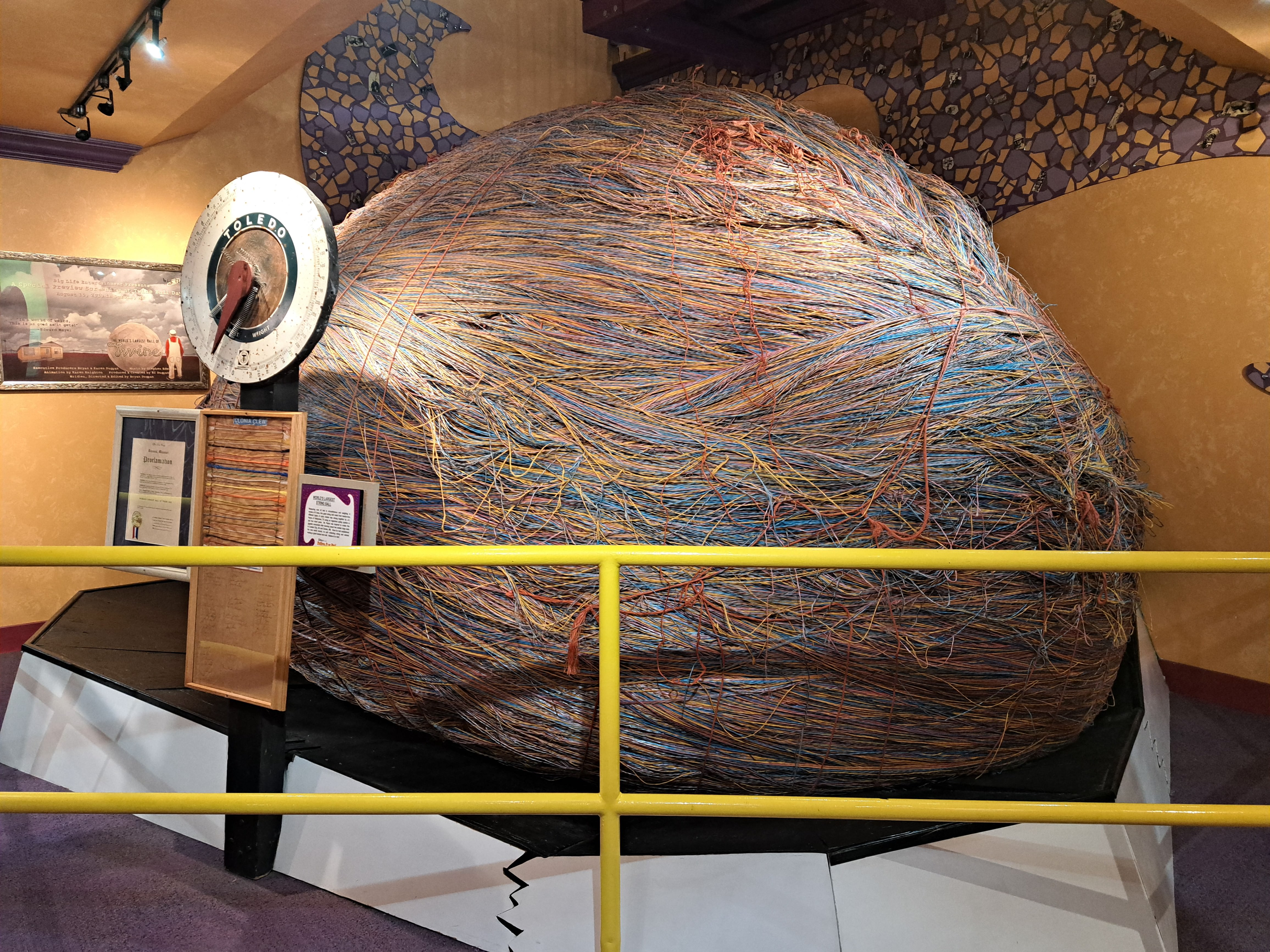
Nylon twine ball in Branson, Missouri (2024)

In Branson, Missouri, a ball of nylon twine built by J. C. Payne of Valley View, Texas, is on display in Ripley's Believe It or Not! museum. The ball, which measures 41.5 feet (12.6 m) in circumference, was certified as the world's largest ball of twine by the Guinness Book of World Records in 1993. It is, however, the lightest of the four contenders, weighing 12,000 pounds.

== Cultural references ==
- In the 1983 movie National Lampoon's Vacation, the character of Clark Griswold tells his family "Or perhaps you don't want to see the second-largest ball of twine on the face of the earth."
- Most notably, one of "Weird Al" Yankovic's original songs is "The Biggest Ball of Twine in Minnesota," from his 1989 album UHF, although Yankovic takes artistic license with the statistics. In 2019, the town renamed the street leading to the ball "Weird Alley" in Yankovic's honor.
  - Postcards that read "Greetings from the Twine Ball, wish you were here," a fictitious invention of Yankovic's, are now an attraction in Darwin. The Twineball Inn was a restaurant (not a motel) that has since closed.
  - Yankovic refers to the ball itself, and thus his previous work, in the video for "White & Nerdy", wherein a Trivial Pursuit card which includes the question "In what city is the largest ball of twine built by one man?" appears on screen.
- In a Garfield and Friends episode, Jon Arbuckle takes his pets to see a giant ball of dental floss, and later a giant ball of gum wrappers.
- In the 1999 film Drop Dead Gorgeous, character Tess Weinhaus references a fictitious world's largest ball of twine in Bunde, Minnesota.
- The Cawker City, Kansas, ball of twine was the subject of the comic strip Doonesbury on July 16, 2012.
- The 1993 video game Sam and Max Hit the Road has the titular duo visit and interact with the world's largest ball of twine, retrieving key items from its interior.
- On October 6, 2026, Comedy Central aired an episode on their series Drunk History titled, "The Biggest Ball of Twine", with Patton Oswalt.
