= Waconda USD 272 =

Public school district in Cawker City, Kansas

Address
- 708 Locust St. Cawker City, Kansas, 67430; United States

District information
- Type: Public
- Grades: K to 12
- Schools: 2

Other information
- Website: usd272.org

Lakeside Junior/Senior High School

Location
- 1306 North Morgan Avenue; Downs, (Osborne County), Kansas 67437; United States
- Coordinates: 39.508171°N 98.544838°W

Information
- Type: Public high school
- Principal: Jeremy Long
- Staff: 12.76 (FTE)
- Enrollment: 135 (2023-24)
- Student to teacher ratio: 10.58
- Colors: Black and white
- Nickname: Knights
- Website: Lakeside Junior/Senior High School

Waconda USD 272 is a public unified school district headquartered in Cawker City, Kansas, United States. The district includes the communities of Cawker City, Downs, Glen Elder, Tipton, and nearby rural areas.

== Schools ==
The school district operates the following schools:

- Lakeside Junior-Senior High School in Downs.
- Lakeside Elementary School in Cawker City.

Lakeside Elementary was formerly known as Cawker City Elementary School, and it received its current name in 2015.

=== Former ===
Schools previously in operation:

- High schools:
  - Downs High School (Downs)
  - Waconda East High School (Cawker City)
- Junior high schools:
  - Downs Junior High School (Downs)
  - Glen Elder Junior High School (Glen Elder)
  - Tipton Junior High School (Tipton)
- Primary schools:
  - Downs Elementary School
  - Glen Elder Elementary School
  - Tipton Elementary School

== See also ==
- Kansas State Department of Education
- Kansas State High School Activities Association
- List of high schools in Kansas
- List of unified school districts in Kansas
