= Old Cawker City Library =

- U.S. National Register of Historic Places
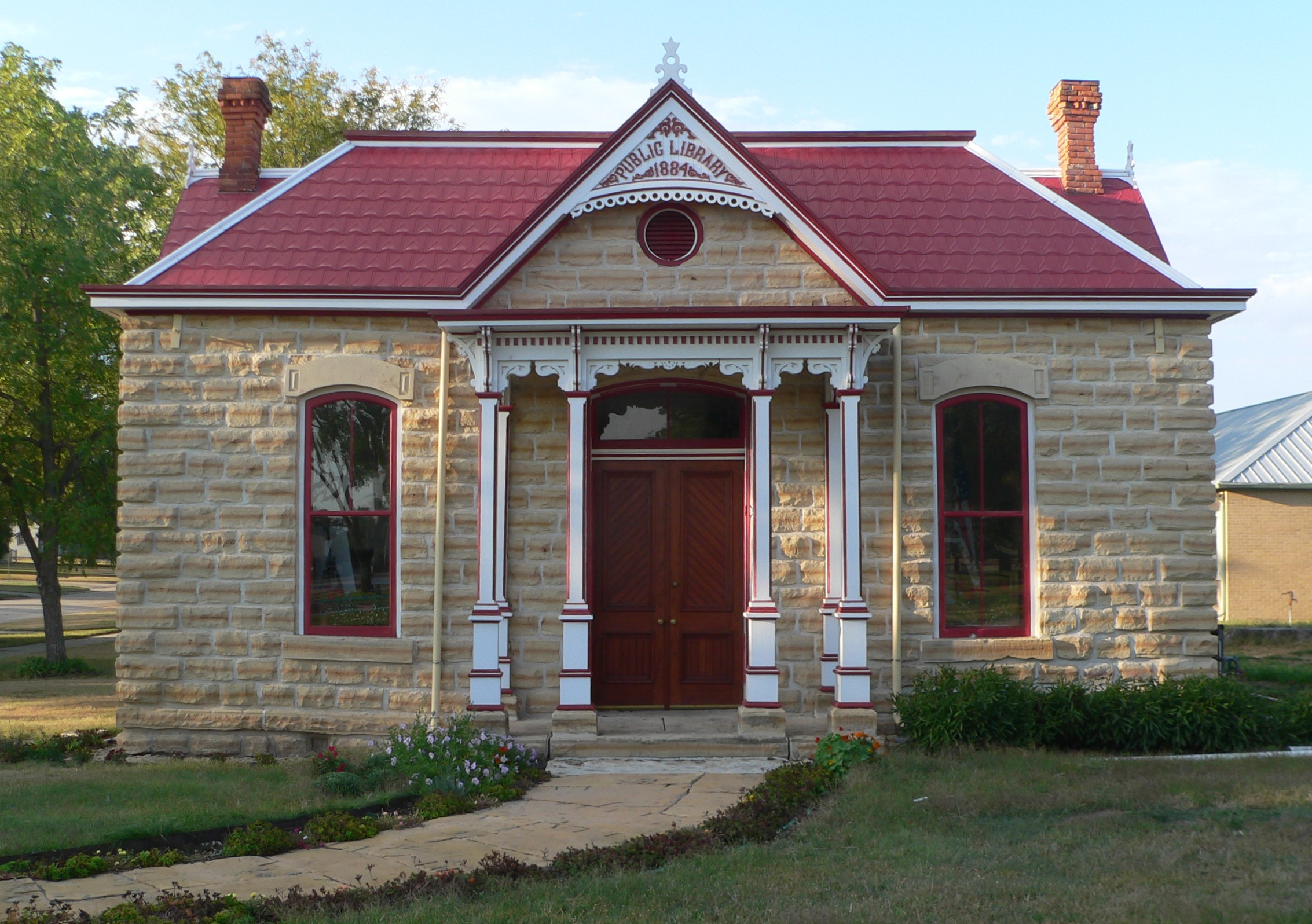

- Location within Kansas Location within the United States
- Location: 7th and Lake Sts., Cawker City, Kansas
- Coordinates: 39.510806°N 98.432839°W
- Built: 1885
- NRHP reference No.: 73000770
- Added to NRHP: March 7, 1973

The Old Cawker City Library at 7th and Lake Sts. in Cawker City, Kansas, United States, was built in 1885. It is a public library which also serves as the headquarters of the North Central Kansas Genealogical Society. It was listed on the National Register of Historic Places in 1973. It was built by local carpenter John Rodger and stonemason William Foster.
