= Lake Nebagamon, Wisconsin =

- Village
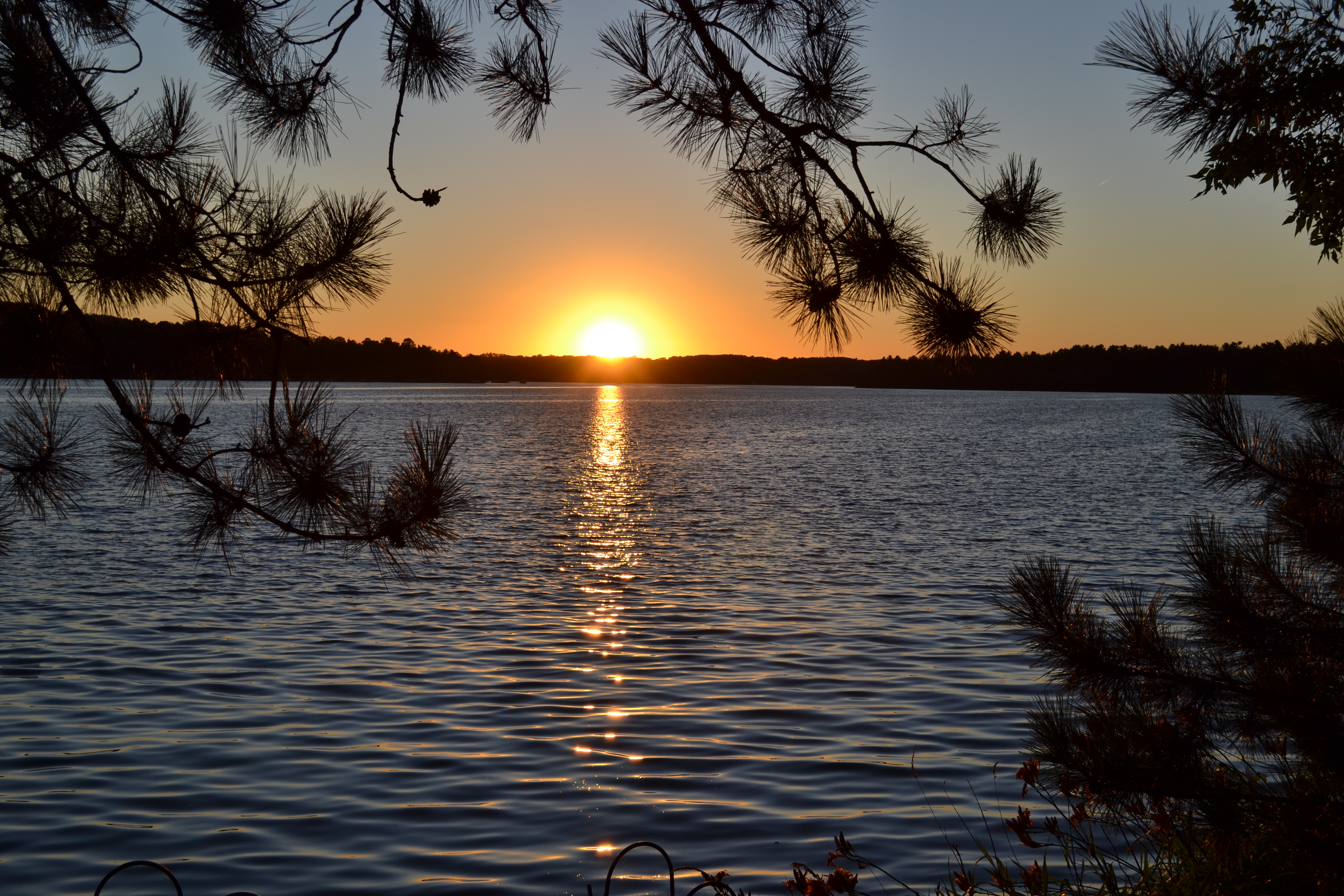
- Sunset in Lake Nebagamon

- Location of Lake Nebagamon in Douglas County, Wisconsin.
- Coordinates: 46°30′46″N 91°42′1″W
- Country: United States
- State: Wisconsin
- County: Douglas

Area
  - Total: 14.26 sq mi (36.94 km^{2})
  - Land: 12.52 sq mi (32.43 km^{2})
  - Water: 1.74 sq mi (4.51 km^{2})
- Elevation: 1,152 ft (351 m)

Population (2020)
  - Total: 1,123
  - Estimate (2022): 1,130
  - Density: 83.8/sq mi (32.35/km^{2})
- Time zone: UTC-6 (Central (CST))
  - Summer (DST): UTC-5 (CDT)
- Area codes: 715 and 534
- FIPS code: 55-41725
- GNIS feature ID: 1567743
- Website: https://villagelakenebagamon.wi.gov/

Lake Nebagamon is a village in Douglas County, Wisconsin, United States. The population was 1,123 at the 2020 census, up from 1,069 at the 2010 census.

== Transportation ==
U.S. Highways 2 and 53 and Wisconsin Highway 27 are located in the Lake Nebagamon area. County Road F, County Road P, and County Road B are three of the main routes in the community.

== History ==
Nebagamon is derived from the Indigenous Chippewa language and the phrase "Nee-bay-go-moh-win", translated as "place to hunt deer by fire on the water." However, the journals and maps of French explorer Joseph Nicollet suggest that this could be a mistake in translation. It is chronicled on Wednesday, August 9, 1837, by Nicollet, that Nibegomowin Creek (Now Nebagamon Creek, sharing its name with the lake) was, at the time, referred to as Sleeping Bear River. Nibegomowin more closely translates to night-time game waiting and could be a place where games, such as bears, are rested or tracked at night. Sleeping Bear River (Nebagamon Creek) can be seen on Nicollet’s 1843 map, Hydrographical Basin of the Upper Mississippi River.

== Geography ==
Lake Nebagamon is located at 46°30′46″N 91°42′1″W (46.512894, -91.700351). According to the United States Census Bureau, the village has a total area of 14.34 square miles (37.14 km^{2}), of which 12.60 square miles (32.63 km^{2}) is land and 1.74 square miles (4.51 km^{2}) is water.

Lake Nebagamon is located 26 miles southeast of its county seat, the city of Superior.

== Demographics ==
Historical population
Census	Pop.	Note	%±
1910	483		—
1920	458		−5.2%
1930	367		−19.9%
1940	357		−2.7%
1950	340		−4.8%
1960	346		1.8%
1970	523		51.2%
1980	780		49.1%
1990	900		15.4%
2000	1,015		12.8%
2010	1,069		5.3%
2020	1,123		5.1%
2022 (est.)	1,130	▲	0.6%
U.S. Decennial Census

=== 2010 census ===
As of the census of 2010, there were 1,069 people, 446 households, and 321 families lived in the village. The population density was 84.8 inhabitants per square mile (32.7/km^{2}). There were 775 housing units at an average density of 61.5 per square mile (23.7/km^{2}). The racial makeup of the village was 95.9% White, 0.4% African American, 0.3% Native American, 0.9% Asian, 0.6% from other races, and 2.0% from two or more races. Hispanic or Latino of any race were 0.7% of the population.

There were 446 households, of which 28.7% had children under the age of 18 living with them, 60.8% were married couples living together, 5.6% had a female householder with no husband present, 5.6% had a male householder with no wife present, and 28.0% were non-families. 21.3% of all households comprised individuals, and 7% had someone living alone who was 65 years of age or older. The average household size was 2.40 and the average family size was 2.75.

The median age in the village was 47.5 years. 22.2% of residents were under the age of 18; 4.7% were between the ages of 18 and 24; 19.4% were from 25 to 44; 38.7% were from 45 to 64; and 14.9% were 65 years of age or older. The gender makeup of the village was 52.5% male and 47.5% female.

=== 2000 census ===
As of the census of 2000, there were 1,015 people, 428 households, and 294 families living in the village. The population density was 80.2 people per square mile (31.0/km^{2}). There were 746 housing units at an average density of 58.9 per square mile (22.8/km^{2}). The racial makeup of the village was 98.52% White, 0.20% African American, 0.69% Native American, 0.10% Asian, 0.30% from other races, and 0.20% from two or more races. Hispanic or Latino of any race were 0.79% of the population.

There were 428 households, out of which 29.9% had children under the age of 18 living with them, 59.3% were married couples living together, 6.3% had a female householder with no husband present, and 31.1% were non-families. 27.6% of all households were made up of individuals, and 12.9% had someone living alone who was 65 years of age or older. The average household size was 2.37 and the average family size was 2.85.

In the village, the population was spread out, with 25.5% under the age of 18, 4.0% from 18 to 24, 26.1% from 25 to 44, 29.5% from 45 to 64, and 14.9% who were 65 years of age or older. The median age was 42 years. For every 100 females, there were 103.8 males. For every 100 females age 18 and over, there were 104.3 males.

The median income for a household in the village was $48,333, and the median income for a family was $59,792. Males had a median income of $41,302 versus $30,156 for females. The per capita income for the village was $23,665. About 2.1% of families and 5.1% of the population were below the poverty line, including 6.0% of those under age 18 and 4.2% of those age 65 or over.

== Recreation ==
The village is the home of Camp Nebagamon, a boys' overnight camp founded in 1929. The camp is located on property originally owned by Weyerhauser Paper Company.

== Culture ==
Lake Nebagamon Auditorium, listed on the National Register of Historic Places

Lake Nebagamon is one of the places claiming to be the home of the world's heaviest ball of twine.

The town's former Dairy Queen, which is now the Dairy & Bean, was the oldest DQ in the state of Wisconsin.

Each year in early July, the town hosts a five-mile run, known as the "Dragin' Tail Run." The run allows contestants to see the entire town, and includes the Imogene McGrath Memorial Library, three churches and the Historic Lakefront Auditorium. Participants receive a T-shirt depicting a fireman using a dragon's tail as a fire hose, representing the Lake Nebagamon Fire Dept.'s heavy sponsorship of the event.

== Notable people ==
- Noel Wien, Alaska aviator, was born in Lake Nebagamon.
