= El Dorado: A Kansas Recessional =

1901 short story by Willa Cather

- Short story by Willa Cather
- Country: United States
- Language: English
- Genre: Short story

Publication
- Published in: New England Magazine
- Publication type: Literary magazine
- Publication date: June 1901

"El Dorado: A Kansas Recessional" is a short story by Willa Cather. It was first published in New England Magazine in June 1901.

== Plot summary ==
=== I ===
Colonel Josiah Bywaters is the sole remaining inhabitant of El Dorado, a Kansas town by the Solomon River (a fictional town, unrelated to the real El Dorado located in Butler County). He keeps a store there, and likes to dress up and go fishing on Sundays.

=== II ===
In Winchester, Virginia four years back, Major Penelton introduced Apollo Gump to Josiah. Although at first he didn't want to invest in Western land, he ended up relenting and moving to El Dorado, a town owned by the Gump family. He invested all his savings there. In Apollo's house he was impressed a picture of Therese Barittini, although Apollo was curt about it. Later the Gumps had to leave because their father had just died. As it was, they took the savings of all the town's inhabitants away in a major swindle. Inhabitants from neighbouring towns learn about it from a columns in a New York City newspaper and come and take back whatever they can for the money they'd been lending them. Consequently, El Dorado inhabitants turn on Josiah, until they leave and he is all alone.

=== III ===
A woman from Missouri stops at El Dorado with her children for water. Upon her departure, he ponders on his life back in Winchester.

=== IV ===
At night, a man is digging into the ground. He is killed by a rattlesnake.

=== V ===
The next day Josiah finds the man's horse and then the dead body; it is Apollo. He ends the digging and finds a box which contains the picture of Therese Barittini. Because Apollo was in love, Josiah decides that he will takes his horse and the $10,000 he finds in his pockets, and give him a proper funeral. He forgives him for his deeds. He sets fire to his store and moves out of El Dorado.

== Characters ==
- Colonel Josiah Bywaters. He is from Winchester, Virginia.
- Major Penelton
- Mr Apollo Gump of Kansas. He worked as an usherer in theatres in Kansas City as a youth.
- Aristotle Gump, an 'architect and builder, and professor of mathematics in the Gump Academy'
- Ezekiel Gump, a 'real estate agent, superintendent of waterworks, professor of natural sciences'.
- Isaiah Gump, a church minister.
- De Witt Gump, the 'physician and druggist'
- Chesterfield Gump
- Hezekiah Gump, 'the hardware merchant and president of the El Dorado Board of Trade'.
- Almira Gump, professor of history and Italian in the Gump Academy
- Venus Gump, director of a dressmaking and millinery establishment.
- El Dorado inhabitants
- Inhabitants from neighbouring towns, who come to take back their money after the Gumps have left.
- a woman from Missouri, with her children.

== Allusions to actual history ==
- The Gumps are compared to Menes and Romulus.

== Allusions to other works ==
- Inhabitants from El Dorado are compared to Hesperides and Hercules.
- In Winchester, Apollo took Josiah to see Adelina Patti.
- The Bible is mentioned, with direct references to Nimrod and Mammon.
- The Gumps have a painting which looks like something by Edgar Degas.
- Dante is also mentioned.

== Literary significance and criticism ==
- In a 1938 letter to Edward Wagenknetch, Willa Cather admitted that El Dorado: A Kansas Recessional was retouched by one of her professors and submitted for publication without her consent.
