= Darwin, Minnesota =

City in Minnesota, United States

- City
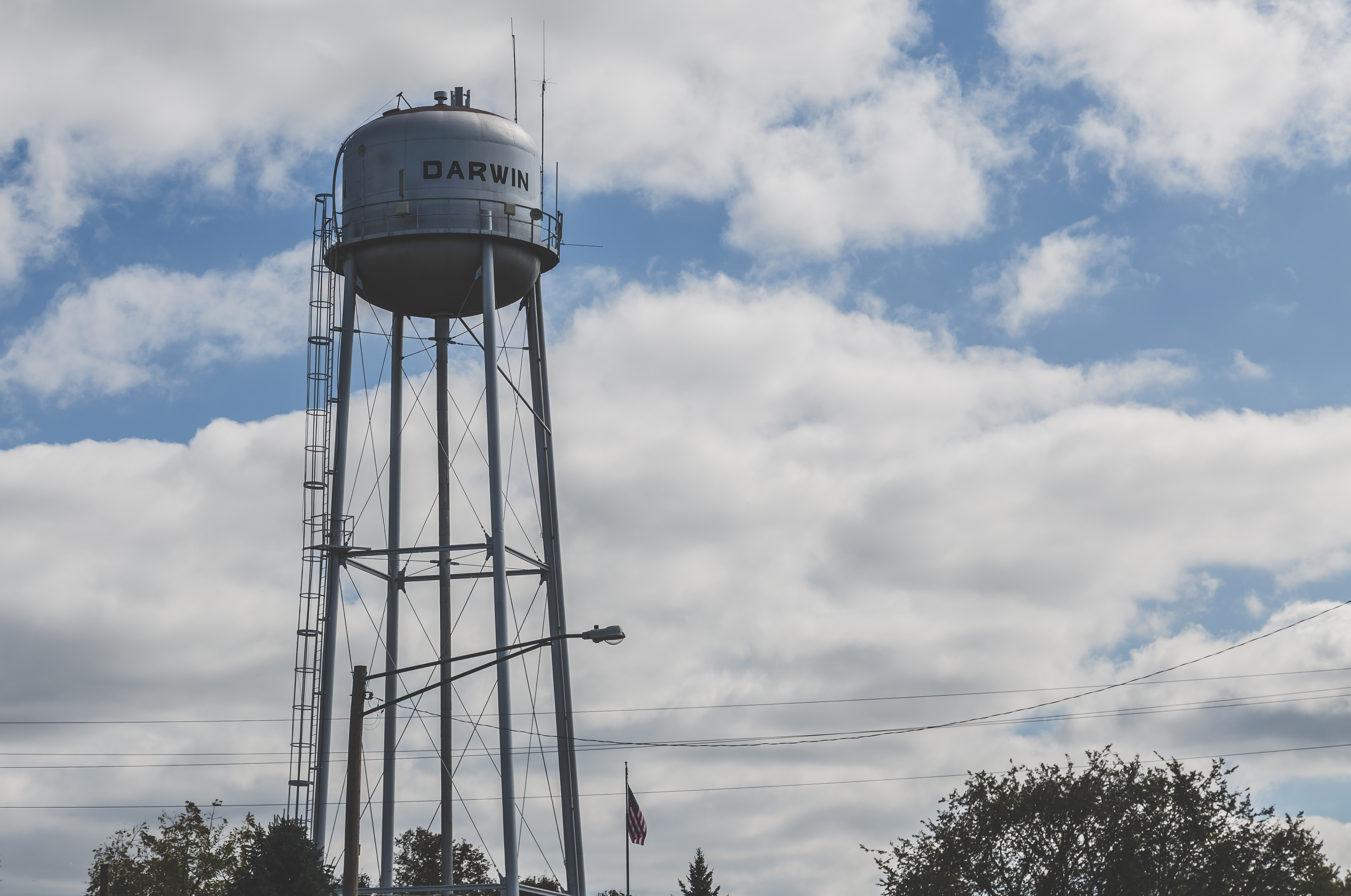
- Darwin water tower

- Location in Meeker County and the state of Minnesota
- Coordinates: 45°05′49″N 94°24′49″W
- Country: United States
- State: Minnesota
- County: Meeker

Area
  - Total: 2.08 sq mi (5.38 km^{2})
  - Land: 2.00 sq mi (5.17 km^{2})
  - Water: 0.081 sq mi (0.21 km^{2})
- Elevation: 1,109 ft (338 m)

Population (2020)
  - Total: 348
  - Density: 174.5/sq mi (67.36/km^{2})
- Time zone: UTC-6 (Central (CST))
  - Summer (DST): UTC-5 (CDT)
- ZIP code: 55324
- Area code: 320
- FIPS code: 27-14842
- GNIS feature ID: 2393721

Darwin is a city in Meeker County, Minnesota, United States. The population was 348 at the 2020 census.

It is one of several places claiming to be home of the largest ball of twine in the world.

== History ==
Darwin was platted in 1869 and named for E. Darwin Litchfield, a major stockholder of the Saint Paul and Pacific Railroad. A post office has been in operation at Darwin since 1869.

== Geography ==
Darwin is in east-central Meeker County, along U.S. Route 12, which passes through the northeast portion of the city. US 12 leads northwest 6 miles (10 km) to Litchfield, the county seat, and east-southeast 5 miles (8 km) to Dassel.

According to the U.S. Census Bureau, Darwin has a total area of 2.08 square miles (5.39 km^{2}), of which 2.00 square miles (5.18 km^{2}) are land and 0.08 square miles (0.21 km^{2}), or 3.99%, are water. Turtle Lake lies partly within the city, along its eastern border, while Lake Darwin lies just outside the southeast corner of the city.

== Demographics ==
Historical population
Census	Pop.	Note	%±
1880	56		—
1920	132		—
1930	156		18.2%
1940	224		43.6%
1950	273		21.9%
1960	273		0.0%
1970	361		32.2%
1980	282		−21.9%
1990	252		−10.6%
2000	276		9.5%
2010	350		26.8%
2020	348		−0.6%
U.S. Decennial Census

=== 2010 census ===
As of the census of 2010, there were 350 people, 139 households, and 91 families residing in the city. The population density was 175.9 inhabitants per square mile (67.9/km^{2}). There were 153 housing units at an average density of 76.9 per square mile (29.7/km^{2}). The racial makeup of the city was 96.9% White, 0.3% African American, 0.3% Asian, 1.4% from other races, and 1.1% from two or more races. Hispanic or Latino of any race were 3.4% of the population.

There were 139 households, of which 30.9% had children under the age of 18 living with them, 57.6% were married couples living together, 2.9% had a female householder with no husband present, 5.0% had a male householder with no wife present, and 34.5% were non-families. 25.2% of all households were made up of individuals, and 8.6% had someone living alone who was 65 years of age or older. The average household size was 2.52 and the average family size was 3.10.

The median age in the city was 38.7 years. 24.3% of residents were under the age of 18; 7% were between the ages of 18 and 24; 27% were from 25 to 44; 27.5% were from 45 to 64; and 14.6% were 65 years of age or older. The gender makeup of the city was 51.7% male and 48.3% female.

=== 2000 census ===
As of the census of 2000, there were 276 people, 119 households, and 79 families residing in the city. The population density was 368.7 inhabitants per square mile (142.4/km^{2}). There were 130 housing units at an average density of 173.6 per square mile (67.0/km^{2}). The racial makeup of the city was 92.03% White, 0.72% African American, 5.80% from other races, and 1.45% from two or more races. Hispanic or Latino of any race were 5.07% of the population.

There were 119 households, out of which 31.1% had children under the age of 18 living with them, 54.6% were married couples living together, 9.2% had a female householder with no husband present, and 33.6% were non-families. 29.4% of all households were made up of individuals, and 14.3% had someone living alone who was 65 years of age or older. The average household size was 2.32 and the average family size was 2.84.

In the city, the population was spread out, with 27.2% under the age of 18, 6.9% from 18 to 24, 25.0% from 25 to 44, 25.0% from 45 to 64, and 15.9% who were 65 years of age or older. The median age was 38 years. For every 100 females, there were 97.1 males. For every 100 females age 18 and over, there were 97.1 males.

The median income for a household in the city was $34,286, and the median income for a family was $37,321. Males had a median income of $31,000 versus $22,500 for females. The per capita income for the city was $16,813. About 6.0% of families and 10.2% of the population were below the poverty line, including 17.1% of those under the age of eighteen and 8.5% of those 65 or over.

== Parks and recreation ==
Darwin Twine Ball Museum

Darwin is the home of Darwin–Dassel Park.

The Twine Ball Museum is located at Darwin, adjacent to the biggest ball of twine in Minnesota. It is located on 1st Street and Weird Alley, the latter named for Weird Al Yankovic, the author of the song The Biggest Ball of Twine in Minnesota.

== Infrastructure ==
=== Transportation ===
U.S. Highway 12 serves as a main route in the community. The BNSF main line to Seattle runs through Darwin.
