= Emma B. Alrich =

American journalist, author, educator

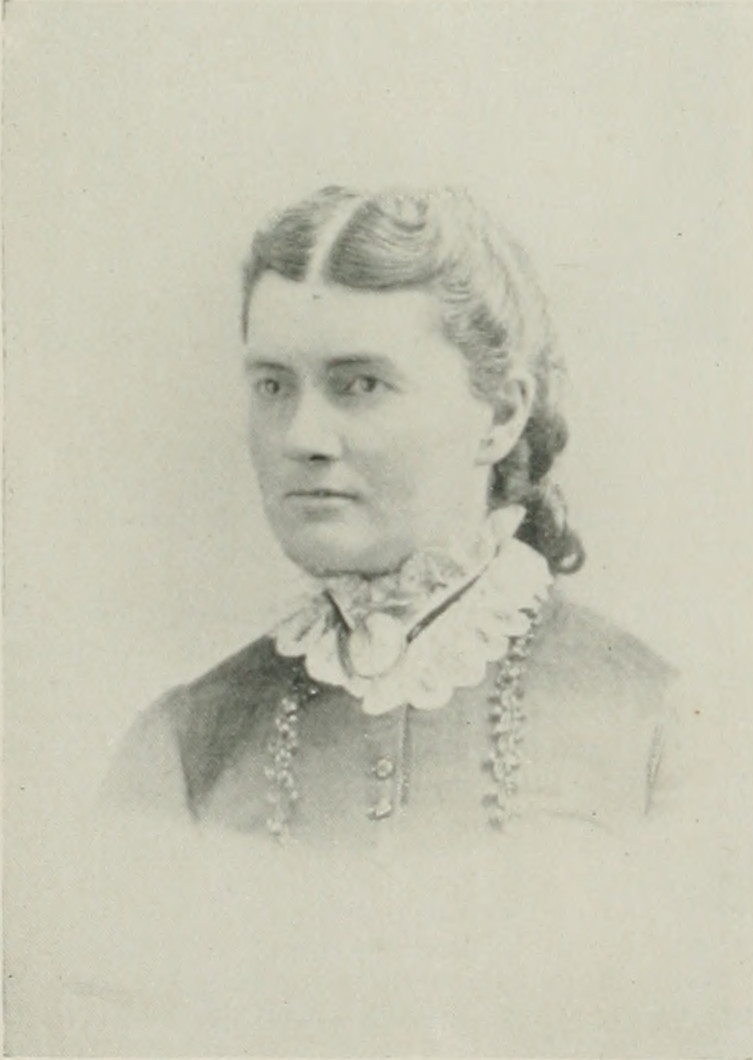
- Photo in A Woman of the Century
- Born: Emma B. Eldridge; April 4, 1845; Cape May County, New Jersey, U.S.
- Died: December 15, 1925 (aged 80); Cawker City, Kansas, U.S.
- Resting place: Prairie Grove Cemetery, Cawker City
- Education: State Normal School (now The College of New Jersey)
- Occupations: journalist; author; educator
- Spouse: Levi L. Alrich (m. 1886)

Emma B. Alrich (née, Eldridge; April 4, 1845 – December 15, 1925) was an American journalist, author, and educator. Born in New Jersey, she moved to Kansas after marriage. Alrich served as Filing Clerk of the Kansas Legislature, and was the only woman in her day to serve as superintendent of the city schools of Mitchell County, Kansas. She was a charter member of the National Woman's Relief Corps (WRC), as well as its national senior vice-president. She was the department president of Kansas WRC, and charter member of the Denver, Colorado WRC in 1883.

== Early life and education ==
Emma B. Eldridge was born in Cape May County, New Jersey, on April 4, 1845. She was her parents' first child. At the age of three, a New Testament was given to her as a prize because she could read it. Two years later, she was selling blackberries to buy an arithmetic book. At age twelve, she joined the Baptist Church and she began to write for the county paper.

When she was sixteen, Alrich taught the summer school at her home. In 1862, she entered the State Normal School (now The College of New Jersey) in Trenton, New Jersey, going out for six months in the middle of the course to earn the money to finish it. She was graduated in June, 1864, as valedictorian of her class.

== Career ==
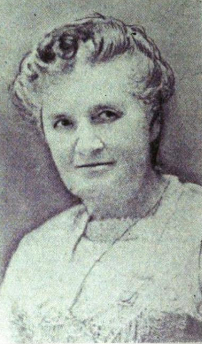
Emma B. Alrich, from a 1922 publication.

Alrich began to teach in a summer school immediately following her graduation. On February 13, 1886, she married Levi L. Alrich, who was remembered as one of Baker's Cavalry of the 71st Pennsylvania Infantry. Her first two years of married life were spent in Philadelphia, Pennsylvania. In 1876, the Centennial opened up new opportunities and the couple settled in Cawker City, Kansas. There, she again taught school. She was also the first woman in Mitchell County to take the highest grade certificate, and the only woman at the time who served as superintendent of the city schools. She was a supporter of teachers' meetings, church social gatherings, a public library and a woman's club. She served two years on the board of teachers' examiners, and was one of the three who founded the Woman's Hesperian Library Club.

In 1883, Levi Alrich's failing health compelled a change in business. He bought the Free Press, and changed its name to the Public Record. All the work of the office was done by the Alrich family, including her journalistic work, but had little time for purely literary work. Alrich was the founder of the Kansas Woman's Press Association..

She was one of the forty who organized the National WRC, and served as its national senior vice-president. She was the department president of the Kansas WRC, and a charter member of the Denver, Colorado WRC (1883).

== Death ==
Emma Alrich died December 15, 1925, in Cawker City, and was buried in the Prairie Grove Cemetery.
