= St. John the Baptist Catholic Church (Beloit, Kansas) =

Historic church in Kansas, United States

- U.S. National Register of Historic Places
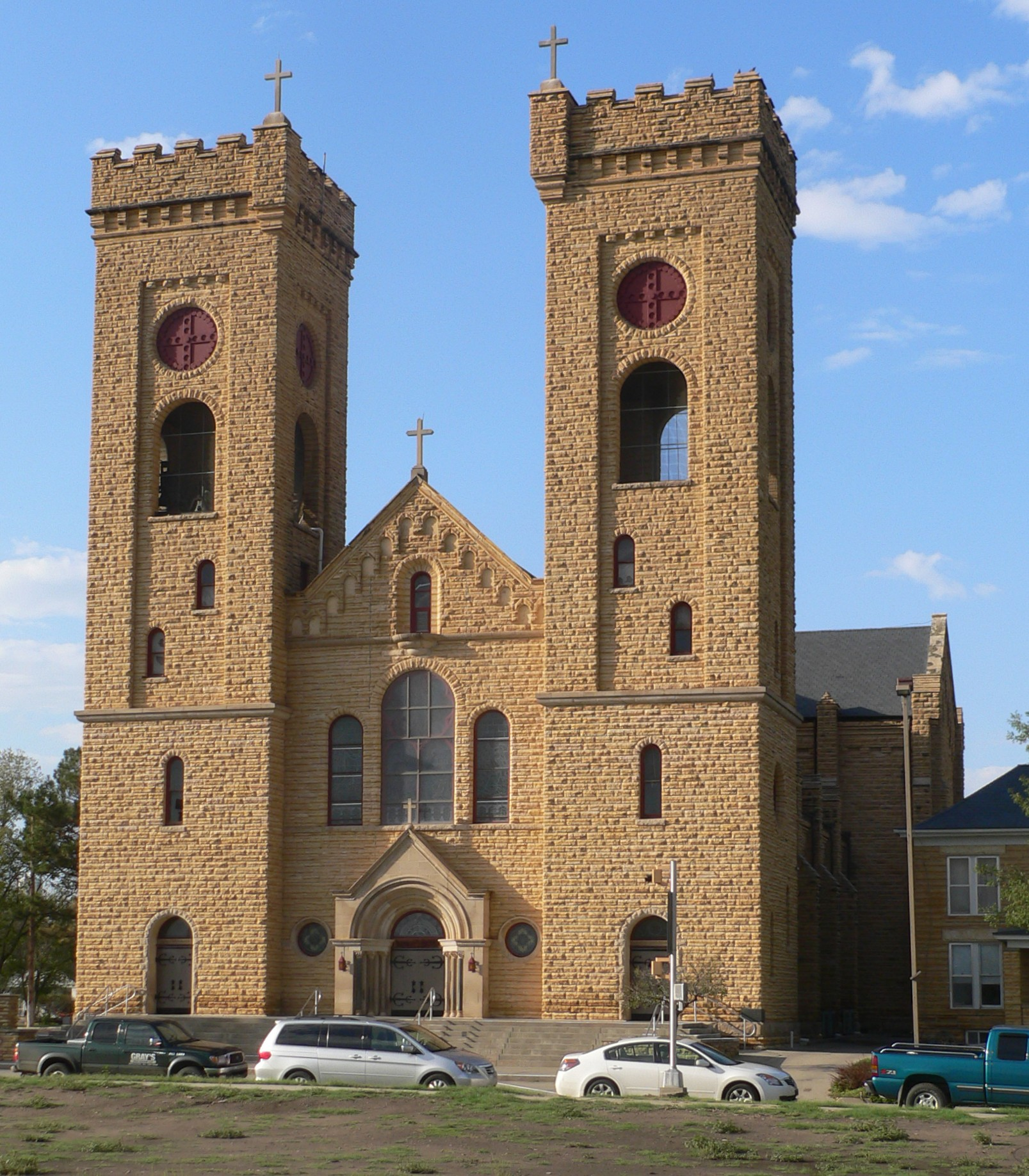

- Location within Kansas Location within the United States
- Location: 701 E. Court St., Beloit, Kansas
- Coordinates: 39°27′31″N 98°6′8″W
- Built: 1900
- Architect: Joseph Marshall
- Architectural style: Romanesque, Gothic
- NRHP reference No.: 75000717
- Added to NRHP: April 14, 1975

St. John the Baptist Catholic Church is a historic Roman Catholic church in Beloit, Kansas, United States. The church is listed on the National Register of Historic Places.

Architect Joseph Marshall of Topeka drew the church plan and design, closely based on the cruciform basilica in a mix of Romanesque and Gothic styles that occur often in Germany and the area of Alsace-Lorraine. The construction uses local Post Rock limestone with Indiana limestone trim at the belt course, doors, and windows. Three flying buttresses on each long wall provide stability to the nave walls and the stone arches above the nave. At the bases of each arch, an immense Vermont granite pillar connects the arch to the foundation and separates the nave from the side aisles. The symmetrical towers are positioned on either side of the nave, and provide separate entry to the side aisles. The sanctuary is a semicircle with a diameter that is the width of the nave, constructed of five pointed arches. The pointed-arch ceilings are built within the pointed roof, made entirely of stone taken from the original church building that the structure replaced.

Dimensions:

- Exterior (facing south) 152 feet long by 74 feet wide, transept width is 98 feet
- Nave (interior) 61 feet long by 66 feet wide, ceiling 40 feet high
- Transept 34 feet deep by 87 feet wide, ceiling 40 feet high
- Towers (exterior) 24 feet long by 36 feet wide, 100 feet high
- Seating capacity 800

The majority of the quarry, delivery, and rock trimming was performed by local farmers under the guidance of the parish pastor, Monsignor Michael Heitz (born in Strasbourg, Alsace-Lorraine, France, date unknown; died 7 February 1941), who had learned to dress stone from professional stonemasons. Building the foundation and full-length crypt began late in 1900; the cornerstone was laid and blessed by Bishop John F. Cunningham (died 23 June 1919) on 4 June 1901. As work progressed around it, the old church was torn down in March 1901. Construction was completed in 1904.

On Sunday, June 27, 2021, a fire started in the church's second floor library. The fire was mostly contained to the library but caused smoke damage throughout the church.
