= Tipton Catholic High School =

Location
- 301 State Street; Tipton, Kansas 67485; United States; 39°20′17″N 98°28′6″W

Information
- Type: Private, Coeducational
- Motto: In the Pursuit of Knowledge
- Religious affiliation: Roman Catholic
- Established: 1919
- Principal: Gery Hake
- Grades: 9–12
- Colors: Red and White
- Team name: Cardinals
- Accreditation: North Central Association of Colleges and Schools
- Publication: Tipton Times
- Athletic Director: Karla Neihouse
- Website: School Website

Tipton Catholic High School is a private Roman Catholic high school in Tipton, Kansas, United States. It is located in the Roman Catholic Diocese of Salina. With an enrollment of 15, it is one of the smallest high schools in Kansas.

== History ==
Tipton Catholic High School was established in 1919. Grades 7 and 8 were added in 2003 and it became known as Tipton Catholic Jr./Sr. High School. In 2011 grades 7 through 8 were moved to the Tipton Community Catholic School and it again was Tipton Catholic High School.

== Athletics ==
Tipton Catholic fields teams with St. John's of Beloit in a co-operative agreement.

== See also ==
- List of high schools in Kansas
- List of unified school districts in Kansas
