= Glen Elder, Kansas =

City in Mitchell County, Kansas

- City
- Glen Elder Statue of Liberty (2017)

- Location within Mitchell County and Kansas

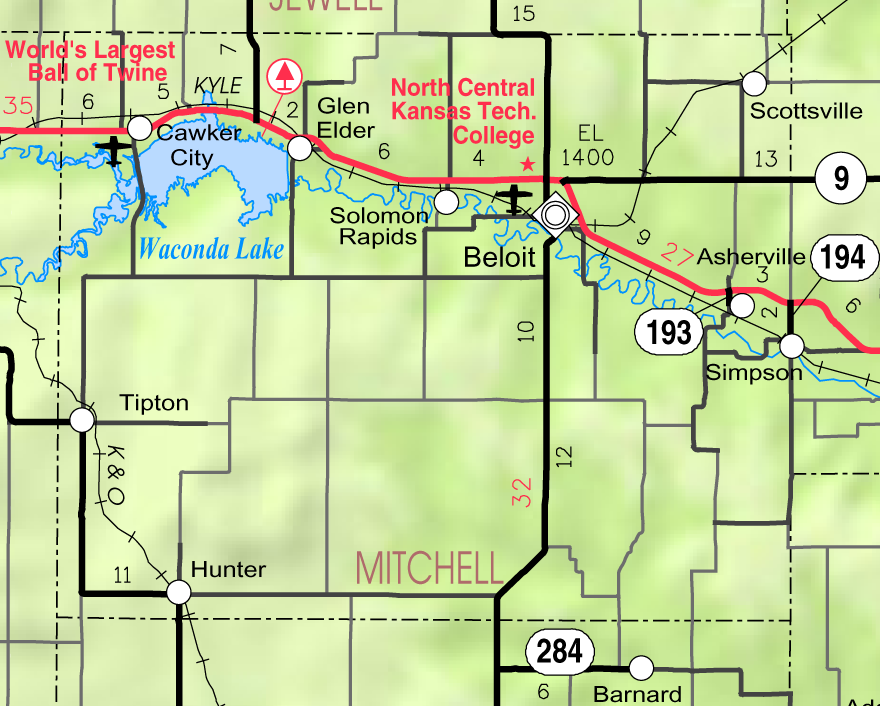
- KDOT map of Mitchell County (legend)
- Coordinates: 39°29′59″N 98°18′23″W
- Country: United States
- State: Kansas
- County: Mitchell
- Founded: 1871
- Incorporated: 1879

Area
  - Total: 0.44 sq mi (1.13 km^{2})
  - Land: 0.44 sq mi (1.13 km^{2})
  - Water: 0 sq mi (0.00 km^{2})
- Elevation: 1,424 ft (434 m)

Population (2020)
  - Total: 362
  - Density: 830/sq mi (320/km^{2})
- Time zone: UTC-6 (CST)
  - Summer (DST): UTC-5 (CDT)
- ZIP Code: 67446
- Area code: 785
- FIPS code: 20-26500
- GNIS ID: 2394910
- Website: glenelder.com

Glen Elder is a city in Mitchell County, Kansas, United States. As of the 2020 census, the population of the city was 362.

== History ==
Glen Elder was originally known as West Hampton, and under the latter name was laid out and platted in 1871 by promoters who built a large gristmill at the site. The town later adopted the name Glen Elder when the post office of that name was moved there from its former location a half mile north. The present name is after a grove of box elder trees. Glen Elder incorporated in 1879.

== Geography ==
According to the United States Census Bureau, the city has a total area of 0.44 square miles (1.14 km^{2}), all of it land.

=== Climate ===
Climate data for Glen Elder, Kansas (1991–2020 normals, extremes 1964–present)
Month	Jan	Feb	Mar	Apr	May	Jun	Jul	Aug	Sep	Oct	Nov	Dec	Year
Record high °F (°C)	75 (24)	81 (27)	88 (31)	100 (38)	103 (39)	109 (43)	111 (44)	109 (43)	107 (42)	95 (35)	89 (32)	82 (28)	111 (44)
Mean daily maximum °F (°C)	40.3 (4.6)	44.8 (7.1)	55.9 (13.3)	66.5 (19.2)	74.9 (23.8)	86.6 (30.3)	92.7 (33.7)	89.4 (31.9)	82.1 (27.8)	69.9 (21.1)	54.9 (12.7)	43.8 (6.6)	66.8 (19.3)
Daily mean °F (°C)	27.0 (−2.8)	30.8 (−0.7)	41.3 (5.2)	51.5 (10.8)	61.4 (16.3)	73.4 (23.0)	78.6 (25.9)	75.8 (24.3)	67.3 (19.6)	54.9 (12.7)	40.6 (4.8)	30.6 (−0.8)	52.8 (11.6)
Mean daily minimum °F (°C)	13.6 (−10.2)	16.8 (−8.4)	26.6 (−3.0)	36.5 (2.5)	47.8 (8.8)	60.2 (15.7)	64.5 (18.1)	62.3 (16.8)	52.5 (11.4)	39.9 (4.4)	26.3 (−3.2)	17.5 (−8.1)	38.7 (3.7)
Record low °F (°C)	−22 (−30)	−16 (−27)	−10 (−23)	10 (−12)	24 (−4)	41 (5)	46 (8)	43 (6)	25 (−4)	14 (−10)	−9 (−23)	−27 (−33)	−27 (−33)
Average precipitation inches (mm)	0.67 (17)	0.72 (18)	1.32 (34)	2.22 (56)	3.87 (98)	3.70 (94)	4.32 (110)	3.12 (79)	2.28 (58)	1.92 (49)	1.14 (29)	0.99 (25)	26.27 (667)
Average precipitation days (≥ 0.01 in)	3.0	3.3	4.8	7.1	9.7	8.6	9.2	7.6	6.7	5.7	3.8	3.0	72.5
Source: NOAA

== Demographics ==
Historical population
Census	Pop.	Note	%±
1880	165		—
1890	407		146.7%
1900	481		18.2%
1910	565		17.5%
1920	615		8.8%
1930	617		0.3%
1940	555		−10.0%
1950	582		4.9%
1960	444		−23.7%
1970	422		−5.0%
1980	491		16.4%
1990	448		−8.8%
2000	439		−2.0%
2010	445		1.4%
2020	362		−18.7%
U.S. Decennial Census

=== 2020 census ===
The 2020 United States census counted 362 people, 171 households, and 106 families in Glen Elder. The population density was 830.3 per square mile (320.6/km^{2}). There were 228 housing units at an average density of 522.9 per square mile (201.9/km^{2}). The racial makeup was 95.3% (345) white or European American (94.75% non-Hispanic white), 0.0% (0) black or African-American, 0.0% (0) Native American or Alaska Native, 0.28% (1) Asian, 0.0% (0) Pacific Islander or Native Hawaiian, 0.28% (1) from other races, and 4.14% (15) from two or more races. Hispanic or Latino of any race was 1.93% (7) of the population.

Of the 171 households, 22.2% had children under the age of 18; 53.2% were married couples living together; 19.3% had a female householder with no spouse or partner present. 33.3% of households consisted of individuals and 18.7% had someone living alone who was 65 years of age or older. The average household size was 2.2 and the average family size was 2.8. The percent of those with a bachelor's degree or higher was estimated to be 18.2% of the population.

22.1% of the population was under the age of 18, 4.1% from 18 to 24, 22.1% from 25 to 44, 24.3% from 45 to 64, and 27.3% who were 65 years of age or older. The median age was 47.6 years. For every 100 females, there were 94.6 males. For every 100 females ages 18 and older, there were 97.2 males.

The 2016–2020 5-year American Community Survey estimates show that the median household income was $51,667 (with a margin of error of +/- $15,534) and the median family income was $80,386 (+/- $11,078). Males had a median income of $45,457 (+/- $7,306) versus $31,875 (+/- $15,028) for females. The median income for those above 16 years old was $36,148 (+/- $2,579). Approximately, 7.3% of families and 8.3% of the population were below the poverty line, including 25.0% of those under the age of 18 and 2.2% of those ages 65 or over.

=== 2010 census ===
As of the census of 2010, there were 445 people, 193 households, and 129 families residing in the city. The population density was 1,011.4 inhabitants per square mile (390.5/km^{2}). There were 250 housing units at an average density of 568.2 per square mile (219.4/km^{2}). The racial makeup of the city was 96.9% White, 0.4% African American, 0.9% Native American, 0.9% Asian, and 0.9% from two or more races. Hispanic or Latino of any race were 2.0% of the population.

There were 193 households, of which 30.6% had children under the age of 18 living with them, 56.0% were married couples living together, 5.2% had a female householder with no husband present, 5.7% had a male householder with no wife present, and 33.2% were non-families. 31.6% of all households were made up of individuals, and 19.2% had someone living alone who was 65 years of age or older. The average household size was 2.31 and the average family size was 2.84.

The median age in the city was 41.2 years. 27% of residents were under the age of 18; 5.8% were between the ages of 18 and 24; 22% were from 25 to 44; 26.5% were from 45 to 64; and 18.7% were 65 years of age or older. The gender makeup of the city was 50.1% male and 49.9% female.

== Parks and Recreation ==
- Waconda Lake and Glen Elder State Park.

== Education ==
The community is served by Waconda USD 272 public school district. The district elementary school is Lakeside Elementary School in Cawker City. The district high school is Lakeside High School in Downs with the mascot Knights.

School unification combined Cawker City High School with Glen Elder High School in 1971 forming Waconda East High School. The Waconda East High School mascot was Vikings. Waconda East High School was then unified with Downs High School in 2003 forming USD 272.

Glen Elder High School was closed through school unification. The Glen Elder High School mascot was Glen Elder Bearcats.

The district previously operated Glen Elder Elementary School and Glen Elder Junior High School.
