= Downs, Kansas =

City in Osborne County, Kansas

- City
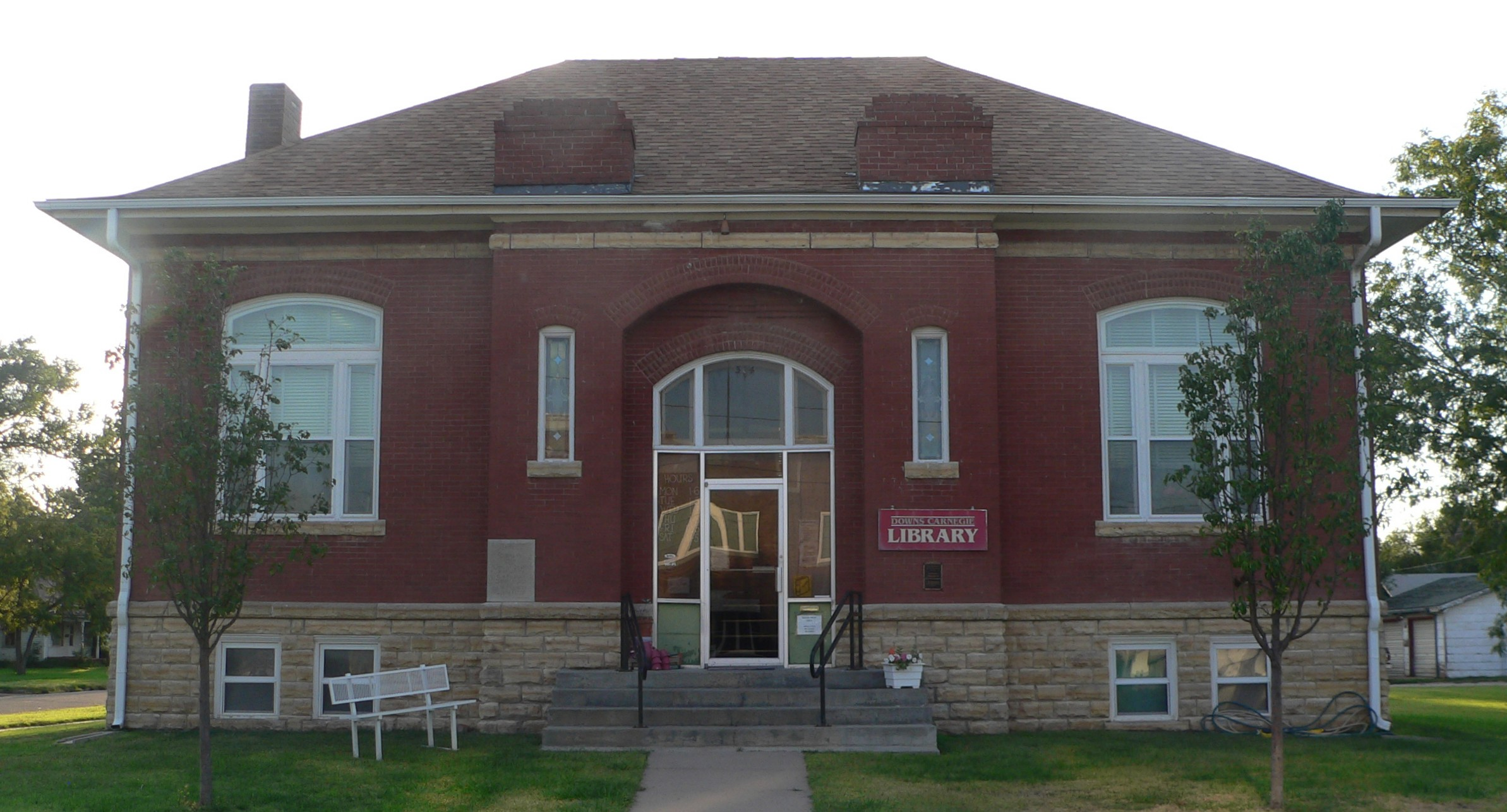
- Downs Carnegie Library (2014)

- Location within Osborne County and Kansas

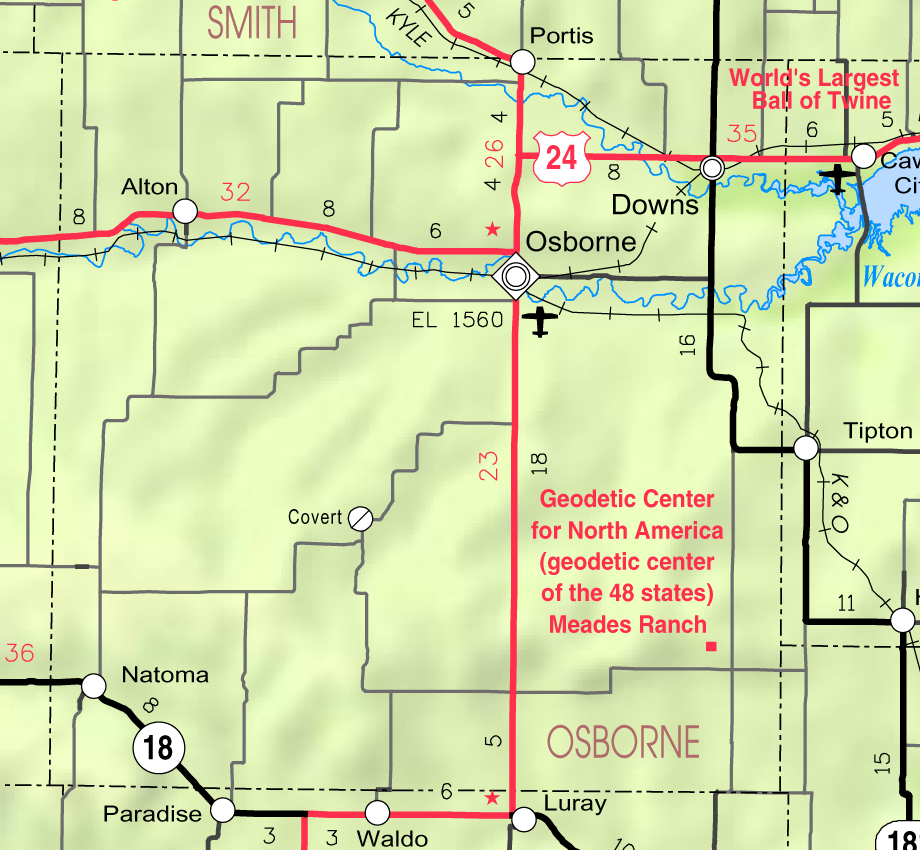
- KDOT map of Osborne County (legend)
- Coordinates: 39°30′12″N 98°32′37″W
- Country: United States
- State: Kansas
- County: Osborne
- Founded: 1879
- Incorporated: 1879
- Named for: William Downs

Area
  - Total: 1.12 sq mi (2.90 km^{2})
  - Land: 1.12 sq mi (2.90 km^{2})
  - Water: 0 sq mi (0.00 km^{2})
- Elevation: 1,483 ft (452 m)

Population (2020)
  - Total: 800
  - Density: 710/sq mi (280/km^{2})
- Time zone: UTC-6 (CST)
  - Summer (DST): UTC-5 (CDT)
- ZIP Code: 67437
- Area code: 785
- FIPS code: 20-18500
- GNIS ID: 2394559
- Website: downsks.net

Downs is a city in Osborne County, Kansas, United States. As of the 2020 census, the population of the city was 800.

== History ==
Downs had its start in the year 1879 when the Central Branch Railroad was extended to that point. It was named for William F. Downs, a railroad official from Atchison. Downs became an incorporated town in December of the same year. In 1910, the city had a population of 1,427. Business included two newspapers, a public library, flour mills, grain elevators, and an opera house.

== Geography ==
According to the United States Census Bureau, the city has a total area of 1.00 square mile (2.59 km^{2}), all land.

== Demographics ==
Historical population
| Census | Pop. | Note | %± |
|---|---|---|---|
| 1880 | 465 | | — |
| 1890 | 938 | | 101.7% |
| 1900 | 938 | | 0.0% |
| 1910 | 1,427 | | 52.1% |
| 1920 | 1,508 | | 5.7% |
| 1930 | 1,383 | | −8.3% |
| 1940 | 1,219 | | −11.9% |
| 1950 | 1,221 | | 0.2% |
| 1960 | 1,206 | | −1.2% |
| 1970 | 1,268 | | 5.1% |
| 1980 | 1,324 | | 4.4% |
| 1990 | 1,119 | | −15.5% |
| 2000 | 1,038 | | −7.2% |
| 2010 | 900 | | −13.3% |
| 2020 | 800 | | −11.1% |
U.S. Decennial Census

=== 2020 census ===
The 2020 United States census counted 800 people, 384 households, and 202 families in Downs. The population density was 714.3 per square mile (275.8/km^{2}). There were 499 housing units at an average density of 445.5 per square mile (172.0/km^{2}). The racial makeup was 92.75% (742) white or European American (92.38% non-Hispanic white), 0.0% (0) black or African-American, 1.12% (9) Native American or Alaska Native, 0.38% (3) Asian, 0.0% (0) Pacific Islander or Native Hawaiian, 1.38% (11) from other races, and 4.38% (35) from two or more races. Hispanic or Latino of any race was 2.38% (19) of the population.

Of the 384 households, 16.4% had children under the age of 18; 43.8% were married couples living together; 27.1% had a female householder with no spouse or partner present. 42.2% of households consisted of individuals and 22.7% had someone living alone who was 65 years of age or older. The average household size was 1.7 and the average family size was 2.4. The percent of those with a bachelor's degree or higher was estimated to be 15.1% of the population.

18.4% of the population was under the age of 18, 4.6% from 18 to 24, 17.4% from 25 to 44, 26.5% from 45 to 64, and 33.1% who were 65 years of age or older. The median age was 54.7 years. For every 100 females, there were 106.7 males. For every 100 females ages 18 and older, there were 109.3 males.

The 2016–2020 5-year American Community Survey estimates show that the median household income was $44,013 (with a margin of error of +/- $7,965) and the median family income was $62,778 (+/- $21,479). Males had a median income of $39,583 (+/- $10,879) versus $26,538 (+/- $8,014) for females. The median income for those above 16 years old was $32,250 (+/- $9,794). Approximately, 7.9% of families and 13.5% of the population were below the poverty line, including 4.5% of those under the age of 18 and 5.8% of those ages 65 or over.

=== 2010 census ===
As of the census of 2010, there were 900 people, 424 households, and 239 families residing in the city. The population density was 900.0 inhabitants per square mile (347.5/km^{2}). There were 508 housing units at an average density of 508.0 per square mile (196.1/km^{2}). The racial makeup of the city was 97.6% White, 0.1% African American, 1.1% Native American, 0.6% Asian, and 0.7% from two or more races. Hispanic or Latino of any race were 0.9% of the population.

There were 424 households, of which 23.3% had children under the age of 18 living with them, 44.6% were married couples living together, 9.4% had a female householder with no husband present, 2.4% had a male householder with no wife present, and 43.6% were non-families. 39.9% of all households were made up of individuals, and 18.4% had someone living alone who was 65 years of age or older. The average household size was 2.04 and the average family size was 2.68.

The median age in the city was 49.5 years. 20.2% of residents were under the age of 18; 5.9% were between the ages of 18 and 24; 17.1% were from 25 to 44; 30.8% were from 45 to 64; and 26% were 65 years of age or older. The gender makeup of the city was 47.3% male and 52.7% female.

== Education ==
The community is served by Waconda USD 272 public school district. The district elementary school is Lakeside Elementary School in Cawker City. The district high school is Lakeside High School in Downs, with the mascot Knights.

School unification combined Downs and Waconda East schools into USD 272 in 2003. The combined high school became Lakeside Jr./Sr. High School located in Downs.

Downs High School was closed through school unification. The Downs High School mascot was Dragons. The Downs Dragons won the following Kansas State High School championships:

- 1938 Boys Basketball - Class B
- 1950 Boys Basketball - Class B
- 1988 Boys Cross Country - Class 2-1A

Downs Elementary School and Downs Junior High School were closed too.

== Notable people ==
- Francis Schmidt, football and basketball coach

== See also ==
- Meades Ranch Triangulation Station, the geodetic base point for the North American Datum of 1927 (NAD 27), which was used as a reference point until 1983.
- Waconda Lake and Glen Elder State Park.
