= Waconda Lake =

Reservoir in Kansas, United States

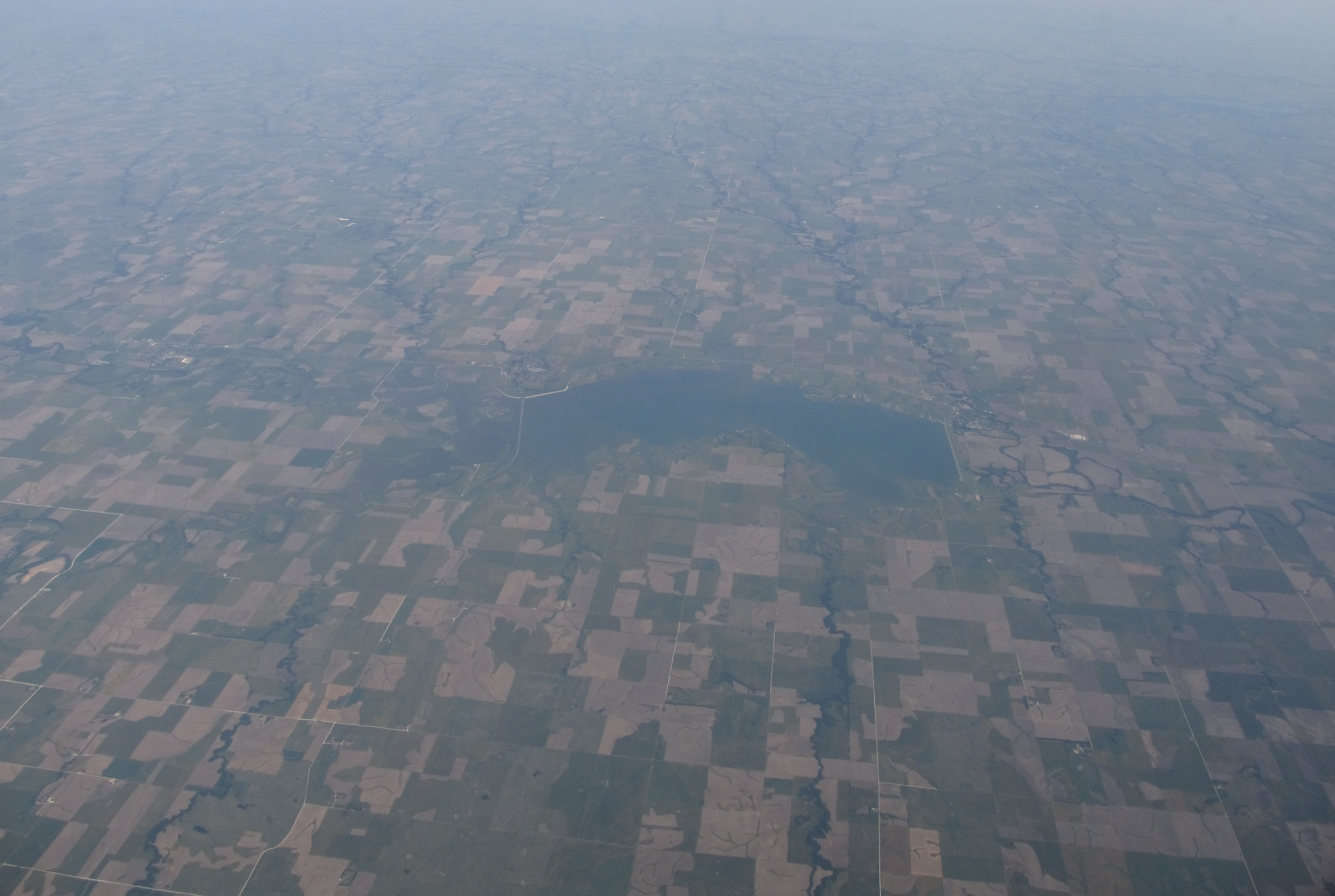
- Aerial view of Waconda Lake

- Location within Kansas Location within the United States

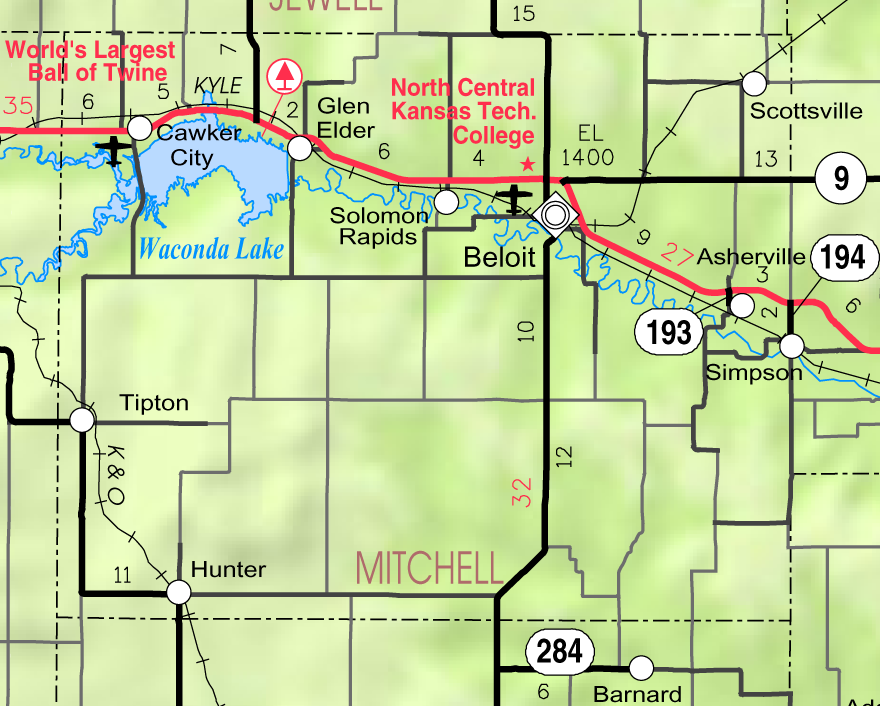
- KDOT map of Mitchell County (legend)
- Location: Mitchell and Osborne counties in Kansas
- Coordinates: 39°29′27″N 98°22′22″W
- Type: Reservoir
- Primary inflows: North Fork Solomon River, South Fork Solomon River
- Primary outflows: Solomon River
- Catchment area: 2,559 sq mi (6,630 km^{2})
- Basin countries: United States
- Managing agency: U.S. Bureau of Reclamation
- Built: November 1964
- First flooded: January 1969
- Max. length: 24 miles (39 km)
- Surface area: 12,602 acres (51.00 km^{2})
- Max. depth: 55 feet (17 m)
- Water volume: Full: 219,420 acre⋅ft (270,650,000 m^{3}); Current (Nov. 2015): 214,784 acre⋅ft (264,932,000 m^{3})
- Shore length^{1}: 100 mi (160 km)
- Surface elevation: Full: 1,456 ft (444 m); Current (Nov. 2015): 1,455 ft (443 m)
- Settlements: Cawker City, Glen Elder
- ^{1} Shore length is not a well-defined measure.

Waconda Lake, also known as Glen Elder Reservoir, is a reservoir in Mitchell County and Osborne County, Kansas, United States. Built and managed by the U.S. Bureau of Reclamation for flood control and irrigation, it is also used for recreation. Glen Elder State Park is located on its north shore.

== History ==
Prior to the building of Glen Elder Dam, the present-day site of Waconda Lake was the location of Waconda Spring, a natural flowing artesian well, from which the lake was named. To capitalize on it, in 1904 the Cawker City Mineral Company opened a resort on the site of the spring. In 1907, G.F. Abraham of Mankato, Kansas converted the resort into a health spa.

Part of the Pick–Sloan Missouri Basin Program authorized by the Flood Control Act of 1944, Glen Elder Dam was one of six units in the Smoky Hill River basin specified as necessary for flood control and irrigation. The U.S. Bureau of Reclamation began purchasing rights-of-way in June 1963 and started constructing the dam and Waconda Lake in November 1964. Despite efforts to preserve Waconda Spring as a national monument, the health spa was torn down, and, in 1968, the spring itself was sealed. Construction finished in January 1969, and the spring was submerged beneath the new reservoir.

Finding the Solomon River inadequate as a municipal water supply, the nearby city of Beloit, Kansas successfully requested use of Waconda Lake. In addition, the reservoir went on to provide water to three rural districts. In November 1976, the Kansas State Board of Agriculture approved Glen Elder Irrigation District-No. 8, enabling use of the reservoir for irrigation.

== Geography ==
Waconda Lake is located at 39°29′27″N 98°22′22″W (39.4909653, -98.3728538) at an elevation of 1,453 feet (443 m). It lies in north-central Kansas in the Smoky Hills region of the Great Plains. Most of Waconda Lake lies in Mitchell County with a small portion of its northwestern arm extending into Osborne County.

The reservoir is impounded at its eastern end by Glen Elder Dam. The dam is located at 39°29′47″N 98°18′57″W (39.4963990, -98.3158893) at an elevation of 1,460 feet (450 m). The North Fork Solomon River and South Fork Solomon River are the reservoir's primary inflows from the west. The Solomon River is its primary outflow to the east. Smaller tributaries, from west to east, include Oak Creek and Granite Creek which flow into the reservoir from the north and Carr Creek, Mill Creek, and Walnut Creek which flow into the reservoir from the south.

U.S. Route 24 and Kansas Highway 9 run concurrently east-west along the reservoir's north shore. Glen Elder Dam Road, a paved county road, runs north-south across the top of the dam. Lake Drive, another paved county road, runs north-south across the reservoir's western end.

There are two settlements on Waconda Lake's north shore: Cawker City at the western end and Glen Elder at the eastern end.

== Hydrography ==
The surface area, surface elevation, and water volume of the reservoir fluctuate based on inflow and local climatic conditions. In terms of capacity, the Bureau of Reclamation vertically divides the reservoir into a set of pools based on volume and water level, and it considers the reservoir full when filled to the capacity of its active conservation pool. When full, Waconda Lake has a surface area of 12,602 acres (51.00 km^{2}), a surface elevation of 1,456 feet (444 m), and a volume of 219,420 acre-feet (270,650,000 m^{3}). When filled to maximum capacity, it has a surface area of 38,178 acres (154.50 km^{2}), a surface elevation of 1,493 feet (455 m), and a volume of 1,107,489 acre-feet (1.366068×10^{9} m^{3}).

The streambed underlying the reservoir has an elevation of 1,385 feet (422 m). Since the reservoir's initial flooding, sedimentation has gradually accumulated on the reservoir bottom thus raising its elevation.

== Infrastructure ==
Glen Elder Dam is an earth-fill embankment dam with a structural height of 142 feet (43 m) tall and length of 15,275 feet (4,656 m). At its crest, the dam has an elevation of 1,500 feet (460 m). A spillway structure controlled by twelve 50-foot radial gates is located at the south end of the dam. It empties into a channel that joins the Solomon River approximately one mile to the east. A separate outlet works structure at the north end of the dam manages outflow into the river itself.

== Management ==
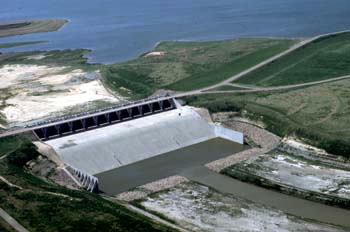
Glen Elder Dam

The U.S. Bureau of Reclamation operates and maintains both Glen Elder Dam and Waconda Lake. The Kansas Department of Wildlife, Parks and Tourism (KDWPT) manages 13,200 acres (53 km^{2}) of land around the reservoir as the Glen Elder Wildlife Area.

== Parks and recreation ==
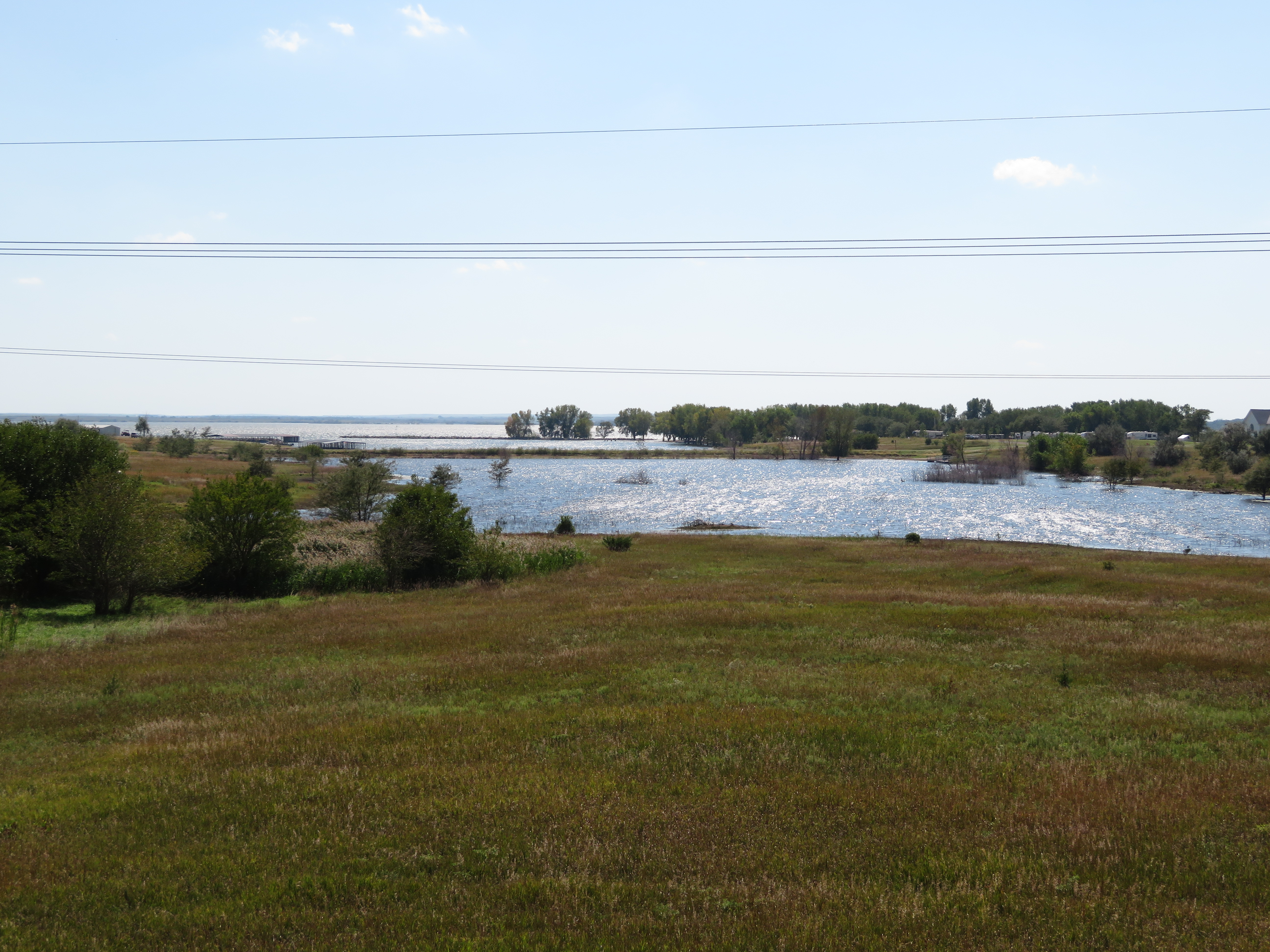
Glen Elder State Park

The KDWPT operates Glen Elder State Park located on the north shore of the reservoir's eastern end. The park includes a visitor center, a marina, an amphitheater, boat ramps, hiking trails, swimming beaches, camping facilities, and the Waconda Heritage Village. It also hosts the annual Waconda Indian Festival.

Waconda Lake is open for sport fishing year-round. The lake contains many top fishing spots, such as The Bluffs, The Dam, Granite Creek and the River. More than 12,000 acres (49 km^{2}) of public land is open for hunting.

=== Points of interest ===
The Waconda Heritage Village is a living museum in Glen Elder State Park. It features Hopewell Church, which was relocated to the park in 1994, and a full-scale replica of Waconda Spring.

== Wildlife ==
Channel catfish, crappie, flathead catfish, striped bass, walleye, and white bass are fish species resident in Waconda Lake. Game animals living around the reservoir include mule deer, pheasants, quail, turkeys, and whitetail deer. Doves, ducks, and geese migrate through the area seasonally. Bald eagles and golden eagles visit in winter.

== See also ==
- List of Kansas state parks
- List of lakes, reservoirs, and dams in Kansas
- List of rivers of Kansas
