= Cawker City, Kansas =

City in Mitchell County, Kansas

- City
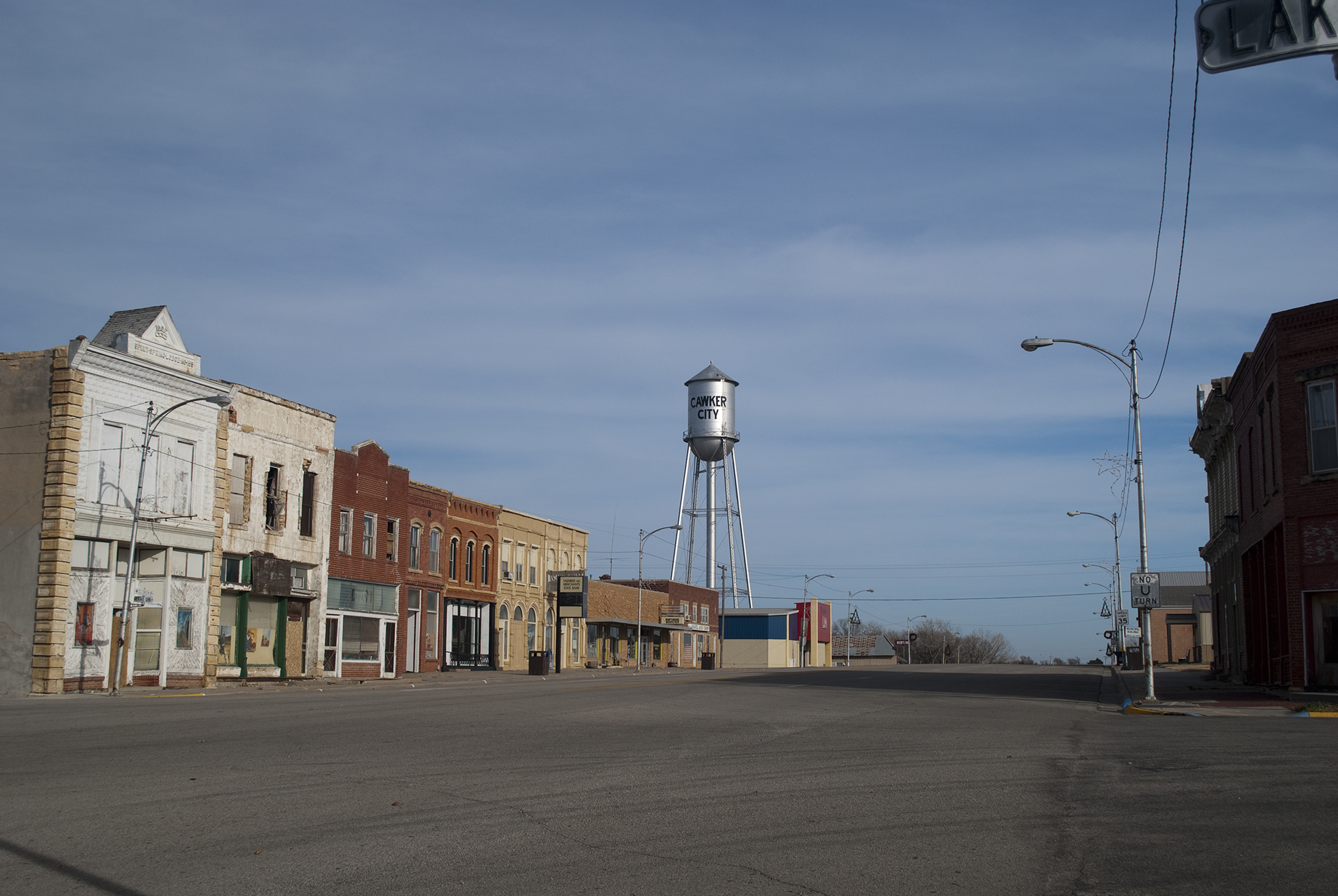
- Water Tower and Downtown (2012) (view from near the Ball of Twine)

- Location within Mitchell County and Kansas

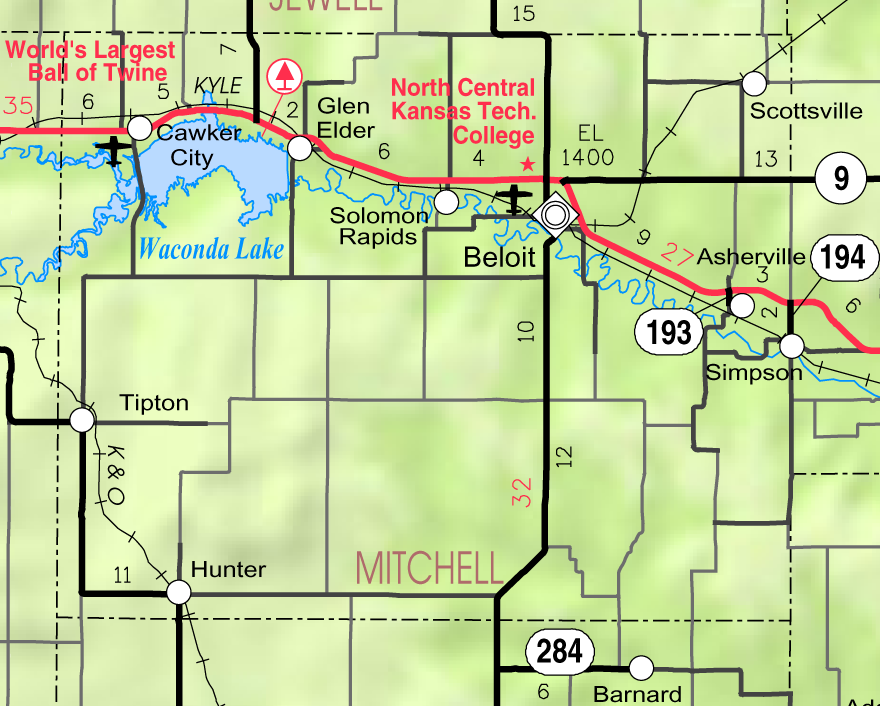
- KDOT map of Mitchell County (legend)
- Coordinates: 39°30′34″N 98°25′59″W
- Country: United States
- State: Kansas
- County: Mitchell
- Founded: 1870
- Incorporated: 1874
- Named for: Colonel E.H. Cawker

Area
  - Total: 1.01 sq mi (2.61 km^{2})
  - Land: 1.01 sq mi (2.61 km^{2})
  - Water: 0 sq mi (0.00 km^{2})
- Elevation: 1,493 ft (455 m)

Population (2020)
  - Total: 457
  - Density: 453/sq mi (175/km^{2})
- Time zone: UTC-6 (CST)
  - Summer (DST): UTC-5 (CDT)
- ZIP Code: 67430
- Area code: 785
- FIPS code: 20-11175
- GNIS ID: 2393772
- Website: cawkercitykansas.com

Cawker City is a city in Mitchell County, Kansas, United States. As of the 2020 census, the population of the city was 457. The city is located along the north shore of Waconda Lake and Glen Elder State Park. It is one of several places claiming to be home of the largest ball of twine in the world.

== History ==
Cawker City was founded in 1870. According to tradition, Colonel E. H. Cawker won naming rights for the town with a winning hand at poker. Cawker City was incorporated as a city in 1874. The first post office in Cawker City was established in June 1870.

The city previously served many families living on small farms. Many young adults were leaving to find work elsewhere. In the area family sizes decreased and farm plot sizes increased. These factors caused the community's population to decline.

== Geography ==
According to the United States Census Bureau, the city has a total area of 1.00 square mile (2.59 km^{2}), all of it land. The city is located along the north shore of Waconda Lake.

== Demographics ==
Historical population
Census	Pop.	Note	%±
1880	1,039		—
1890	898		−13.6%
1900	816		−9.1%
1910	870		6.6%
1920	788		−9.4%
1930	739		−6.2%
1940	657		−11.1%
1950	691		5.2%
1960	686		−0.7%
1970	726		5.8%
1980	640		−11.8%
1990	588		−8.1%
2000	521		−11.4%
2010	469		−10.0%
2020	457		−2.6%
U.S. Decennial Census

=== 2020 census ===
The 2020 United States census counted 457 people, 215 households, and 110 families in Cawker City. The population density was 454.3 per square mile (175.4/km^{2}). There were 292 housing units at an average density of 290.3 per square mile (112.1/km^{2}). The racial makeup was 96.28% (440) white or European American (96.28% non-Hispanic white), 0.22% (1) black or African-American, 0.0% (0) Native American or Alaska Native, 0.0% (0) Asian, 0.0% (0) Pacific Islander or Native Hawaiian, 0.0% (0) from other races, and 3.5% (16) from two or more races. Hispanic or Latino of any race was 0.66% (3) of the population.

Of the 215 households, 20.0% had children under the age of 18; 40.0% were married couples living together; 26.0% had a female householder with no spouse or partner present. 46.5% of households consisted of individuals and 25.1% had someone living alone who was 65 years of age or older. The average household size was 2.3 and the average family size was 2.9. The percent of those with a bachelor's degree or higher was estimated to be 10.3% of the population.

22.8% of the population was under the age of 18, 3.7% from 18 to 24, 19.5% from 25 to 44, 27.4% from 45 to 64, and 26.7% who were 65 years of age or older. The median age was 47.6 years. For every 100 females, there were 97.0 males. For every 100 females ages 18 and older, there were 95.0 males.

The 2016–2020 5-year American Community Survey estimates show that the median household income was $40,125 (with a margin of error of +/- $19,649) and the median family income was $45,250 (+/- $6,979). Males had a median income of $29,750 (+/- $10,771) versus $16,250 (+/- $7,840) for females. The median income for those above 16 years old was $25,000 (+/- $6,753). Approximately, 19.2% of families and 23.7% of the population were below the poverty line, including 47.9% of those under the age of 18 and 14.4% of those ages 65 or over.

=== 2010 census ===
As of the census of 2010, there were 469 people, 244 households, and 132 families residing in the city. The population density was 469.0 inhabitants per square mile (181.1/km^{2}). There were 315 housing units at an average density of 315.0 per square mile (121.6/km^{2}). The racial makeup of the city was 97.0% White, 0.2% African American, 0.2% Asian, 0.9% from other races, and 1.7% from two or more races. Hispanic or Latino of any race were 2.1% of the population.

There were 244 households, of which 19.3% had children under the age of 18 living with them, 40.6% were married couples living together, 7.0% had a female householder with no husband present, 6.6% had a male householder with no wife present, and 45.9% were non-families. 41.8% of all households were made up of individuals, and 19.6% had someone living alone who was 65 years of age or older. The average household size was 1.92 and the average family size was 2.52.

The median age in the city was 50.1 years. 18.6% of residents were under the age of 18; 4.5% were between the ages of 18 and 24; 17.9% were from 25 to 44; 32.4% were from 45 to 64; and 26.7% were 65 years of age or older. The gender makeup of the city was 51.4% male and 48.6% female.

== Attractions ==
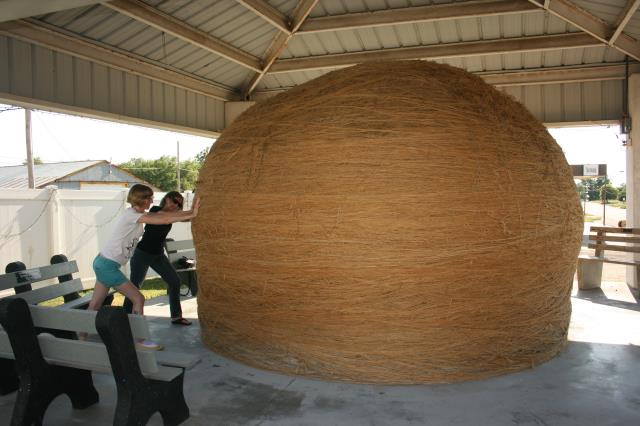
Largest community rolled ball of twine (2013)

- Cawker City is one of several places claiming to be home of the largest ball of twine in the world. Each year a twine-a-thon is held in August to increase the size of the ball.
- Waconda Lake

== Education ==
The community is served by Waconda USD 272 public school district. The district elementary school is Lakeside Elementary school in Cawker City. The district high school is Lakeside High School (Kansas)|Lakeside High School in Downs with the mascot Knights.

School unification combined Cawker City High School with Glen Elder High School in 1971 forming Waconda East High School. The Waconda East High School mascot was Vikings. Waconda East High School was then unified with Downs High School in 2003 forming USD 272.

Prior to school unification, the Cawker City High School mascot was Cawker City Pirates.

The elementary building was formerly known as Cawker City Elementary School. Its name changed to the current one in 2015.

== Notable people ==
- Emma B. Alrich (1845–1925), teacher and superintendent in Cawker City
- Martia L. Davis Berry (1844–1894), social reformer
- Merwin Coad (1924–2025), Iowa politician
- Claire Windsor (1892–1972), silent film actress
