= Dick Bond (Kansas politician) =

American politician (1935–2020)

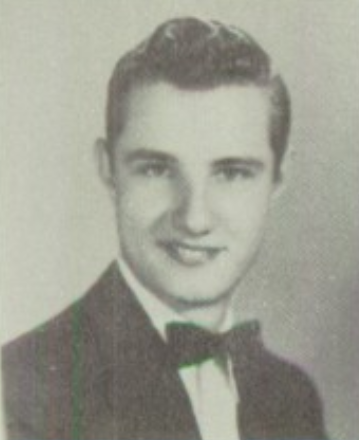
- Dick Bond in 1953

Member of the Kansas Board of Regents
- In office June 21, 2002 – 2007
- Preceded by: Clay Blair III

President of the Kansas Senate
- In office January 13, 1997 – January 8, 2001
- Preceded by: Bud Burke
- Succeeded by: David Kerr

Member of the Kansas Senate from the 8th district
- In office December 1, 1986 – January 8, 2001
- Preceded by: Jack D. Walker
- Succeeded by: Barbara Allen

Personal details
- Born: Richard Lee Bond; September 18, 1935 Kansas City, Kansas, U.S.
- Died: July 23, 2020 (aged 84) Overland Park, Kansas, U.S.
- Party: Republican
- Spouse: Suzanne Sedgwich
- Children: 2
- Education: University of Kansas (BA, JD)

Richard Lee Bond (September 18, 1935 – July 23, 2020) was an American politician who served in the Kansas Senate from the 8th district from 1986 to 2001. A member of the Republican Party, Bond also served as the Majority Whip and President of the Senate. Prior to his tenure in the Kansas Senate, he served as an assistant to three members of the U.S. House of Representatives.

Bond was born in Kansas and practiced law after graduating from the University of Kansas. He served as a city attorney and as an administrative assistant to Representatives Robert Ellsworth, Larry Winn, and Jan Meyers. In 1986, he was appointed to the Kansas Senate to fill the vacancy caused by Jack D. Walker's election as lieutenant governor. In 1992, he was selected to serve as the Majority Whip for the Republicans and was later selected to serve as the President of the Senate in 1997.

After leaving the Kansas Senate he served on the Kansas Board of Regents until his term expired in 2007. During the 2014 and 2018 gubernatorial elections he supported the Democratic nominees and opposed the policies of Governor Sam Brownback and the right-ward shift of the Republican Party.

== Early life and education ==
Richard Lee Bond was born on September 18, 1935, in Kansas City, Kansas, to Ivy and Florine Bond. He graduated from Shawnee Mission High School, and then from the University of Kansas with a bachelor's degree in political science in 1957, and a Juris Doctor in 1960. In 1958, he married Suzanne Sedgwick and had two children with her.

After graduating from law school he served as a lawyer in Mission, Kansas, and later served as the first city attorney of Overland Park, Kansas.

== Career ==
=== Congressional aide ===
From 1961 to 1985, Bond served as an administrative assistant to Representatives Robert Ellsworth, Larry Winn, and Jan Meyers. When Winn announced his retirement in 1983, Governor John W. Carlin stated that Bond was a likely candidate for the Republican nomination to succeed Winn. However, he chose to not seek the Republican nomination. He was retained as an administrative assistant by Representative Meyers who was elected to succeed Winn.

=== Kansas Senate ===
==== Elections ====
In 1986, Mike Hayden and Jack D. Walker won the Kansas gubernatorial election. Walker, a member of the Kansas Senate, would have to resign and have a replacement selected by the Johnson County Republican precinct committeemen appointed by Governor Hayden. On December 1, Bond was appointed to serve the remaining two years of Walker's term by Governor Hayden after being unanimously selected by the Johnson County Republican committeemen.

On June 10, 1992, he filed to run for reelection and won reelection without opposition. In 1996, he won reelection without opposition.

Bond did not seek reelection during the 2000 elections. Barbara Allen was elected in the 2000 election to succeed Bond and took office on January 8, 2001. David Kerr was selected to succeed Bond as President of the Senate.

==== Tenure ====
Bond served on the Transportation, and Federal and State Affairs committees and as the chairman of the Public Health and Welfare sub-committee after being appointed to the Kansas Senate. During the 1993–1997 session of the Kansas Senate he served on the Assessment and Taxation committee, vice-chairman of the Judiciary committee, and as the chairman of the Financial Institutions and Insurance committees. During the 1997–2001 session of the Kansas Senate he served on the Assessment and Taxation, and Judiciary committees and as chairman of the Interstate Cooperation, and Organization, Calendar and Rules committees.

In December 1992, Bond was selected to serve as the Senate Majority Whip starting on January 11, 1993. On April 18, 1996, President of the Senate Bud Burke announced that he would not seek reelection. On December 2, Bond was selected to replace Burke as President of the Senate on the second ballot after defeating Mike Harris and Dave Kerr. On January 13, 1997, he took office as President of the Senate after being approved by acclamation.

During the 1994 Kansas gubernatorial election he supported Secretary of State Bill Graves. He also served on the steering committee of Wint Winter Jr. during the Republican primary for attorney general. In 1996, Governor Graves appointed Suzanne Sedgwick to serve on the nine-member Supreme Court Nominating Commission for a four-year term. During the 1998 Kansas gubernatorial election Bond stated that "It tells you that the Democratic Party is close to bankruptcy" as the party lacked a gubernatorial candidate one week before the filing deadline.

== Later life ==
On June 21, 2002, Governor Graves appointed Bond to replace Clay Blair III on the Kansas Board of Regents for a four-year term. On the same day the Senate Confirmations Oversight Committee voted to allow Bond, James R. Grier III, Martin K. Eby, and Donna Shank to start their service on the Board of Regents until the Kansas Senate could vote on their appointments in 2003. On January 23, 2003, the Kansas Senate voted unanimously with 36 in favor of Bond's nomination. During his tenure on the Board of Regents he served as the vice-chairman and chairman. In 2007, his term on the Board of Regents ended and his successor was selected by Governor Kathleen Sebelius.

During the 2014 Kansas gubernatorial election Bond supported Democratic nominee Paul Davis against incumbent Republican Governor Sam Brownback. During the 2018 Kansas gubernatorial election Bond endorsed Democratic nominee Laura Kelly against Republican nominee Kris Kobach.

In 2005, Bond stated that the Kansas Republican Party had "taken a drastic turn to the right" and that the moderates in the party had allowed the shift. In 2016, former Presidents of the Senate Bond, and Steve Morris, and former Governors Hayden, Graves, Sebelius, and Carlin formed the Save Kansas Coalition to raise money to oppose policies and laws created by Governor Brownback. In 2020, he, Dave Kerr, and Steve Morris, who had all served as Presidents of the Senate, criticized Senate President Susan Wagle for blocking a vote on Medicaid expansion.

On July 23, 2020, Bond died in Overland Park, Kansas, at age 84.

== Political positions ==
=== Capital punishment ===
Bond opposed the use of capital punishment. In 1987, the Federal and State Affairs Senate committee voted six to four, with Bond in favor, in favor of advancing legislation, without a favorable recommendation, that would reconstitute capital punishment in Kansas. He voted in favor of legislation despite being against it as he wanted a debate in the Senate.

=== Crime ===
In 1990, Bond, Bud Bruke, Audrey Langworthy, and Jim Allen introduced legislation that would allow judges to suspend driver licenses if illicit drugs were found in the person's car.

In 1997, the Kansas Senate voted 22 to 18, with Bond against, in favor of legislation that would allow concealed carry.

=== Development ===
In 1987, the Transportation Senate committee voted seven to three, with Bond voting against, in favor of legislation that would create over 740 miles of highways over five years.

In 1992, he stated that he would propose legislation to prohibit casino gambling, including on Indian reservations. He also stated that he would propose a constitutional amendment that would prohibit casino gambling and give half of funds raised through the lottery to education. On January 23, he and twenty-two co-sponsors introduced legislation and a constitutional amendment prohibition casino gambling. The Kansas Senate voted 36 to 2 in favor and the Kansas House of Representatives voted 116 to 6 in favor of the legislation. On May 19, Governor Joan Finney vetoed the legislation and no attempt was made to override her veto by the state legislature.

=== Education ===
In 1996, Bond, Speaker of the House Tim Shallenburger, and Governor Graves supported eliminating the Kansas State Department of Education.

=== Elections ===
In 1989, Bond and nine other Republicans introduced legislation that would replace the presidential caucus with a primary in Kansas, which would be held on the first Tuesday of April, starting during the 1992 presidential election. Bond stated that the presidential caucus held in the 1988 was "a disaster in many cases" due to long waiting hours to vote. The Kansas Senate voted 33 to 6 in favor of the legislation. In 1990, the Kansas House of Representatives voted 85 to 35 in favor of the legislation and the Kansas Senate voted 24 to 15 in favor before Governor Hayden signed the legislation into law on May 18.

While the state legislature was discussing possible ways to have Kansas exempted from the National Voter Registration Act of 1993, as it would cost millions and state law would have to be extensively changed to become compliant with federal law, Bond proposed enacting automatic voter registration for all eligible people.

=== Health ===
In 1988, Bond supported legislation that would define AIDS as a non-communicable disease as that would prevent school districts from prohibiting children with HIV or AIDS from attending school. He also sponsored legislation that would require doctors to report the names and addresses of people with AIDS or had died from AIDS to the Kansas Department of Health and Environment. The Kansas Senate and House of Representatives unanimously voted in favor of Bond's legislation.

=== Taxation ===
In 1990, Bond introduced legislation that would increase the state tax on tobacco and use the money raised by the tax increase on salary increases for the faculty members at Board of Regents schools. The Kansas Senate voted 26 to 13 in favor of the legislation, but the Kansas House of Representatives voted against it.

In 1998, Governor Graves announced that he would cut taxes by over $125 million. Democrats in the Kansas House of Representatives proposed tax cuts ranging from $125 to $150 million; Democrats in the Kansas Senate proposed $140–160 million while Bond supported at least $150 million in tax cuts. On January 23, Bond led all 27 Republican members of the Kansas Senate to show their support for Graves' $178.5 million tax cut proposal.

On November 3, 1999, Bond announced that he would introduced legislation to increase taxes for education funding stating that taxes had been cut too much during the previous legislative session. On January 13, 2000, he introduced legislation that would generate $100 million by increasing the sales tax. His legislation also increased the school year, required knowledge of Spanish for graduation, and abolishing teacher tenure.

== Electoral history ==
1996 President of the Senate first ballot
Party	Candidate	Votes	%
Republican	Dick Bond	10	37.04%
Republican	Mike Harris	9	33.33%
Republican	Dave Kerr	8	29.63%
Total votes		27	100.00%

1996 President of the Senate second ballot
Party	Candidate	Votes	%
Republican	Dick Bond	15	55.56%
Republican	Mike Harris	12	44.44%
Total votes		27	100.00%
