= 1986 Kansas gubernatorial election =

- November 4, 1986
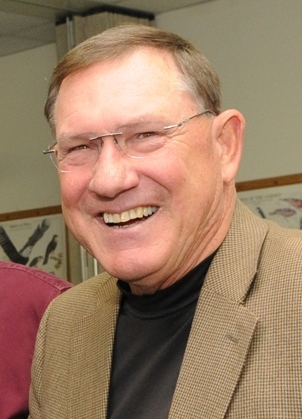

Nominee	Mike Hayden	Thomas Docking
Party	Republican	Democratic
Running mate	Jack D. Walker	John G. Montgomery
Popular vote	436,267	404,338
Percentage	51.90%	48.10%
- County results Hayden: 50–60% 60–70% 70–80% 80–90% Docking: 50–60% 60–70%
Governor before election
John W. Carlin
Democratic
Elected Governor
Mike Hayden
Republican

The 1986 Kansas gubernatorial election was held on November 4, 1986. Incumbent Democratic Governor John W. Carlin did not run for re-election. Republican nominee Mike Hayden, then Speaker of the Kansas House of Representatives, beat the Democratic nominee Thomas Docking, who was then the incumbent Lieutenant Governor of Kansas. This was the last gubernatorial election in Kansas in which the winner was of the same party as the incumbent president until Laura Kelly's victory in 2022.

== Candidates ==
=== Democratic ===
- Thomas Docking, incumbent Lieutenant Governor of Kansas

=== Republican ===
- Mike Hayden, Speaker of the Kansas House of Representatives
- Jack Brier, Secretary of State of Kansas

== General Election ==
=== Results ===
Kansas gubernatorial election, 1986
Party	Candidate	Votes	%	±%
Republican	Mike Hayden/Jack D. Walker	436,267	51.90%	+7.44%
Democratic	Thomas Docking/John G. Montgomery	404,338	48.10%	−5.06%
Majority		31,929	3.80%	−4.90%
Turnout		840,605		
Republican gain from Democratic		Swing		
