= Mary Isenhour =

American political strategist

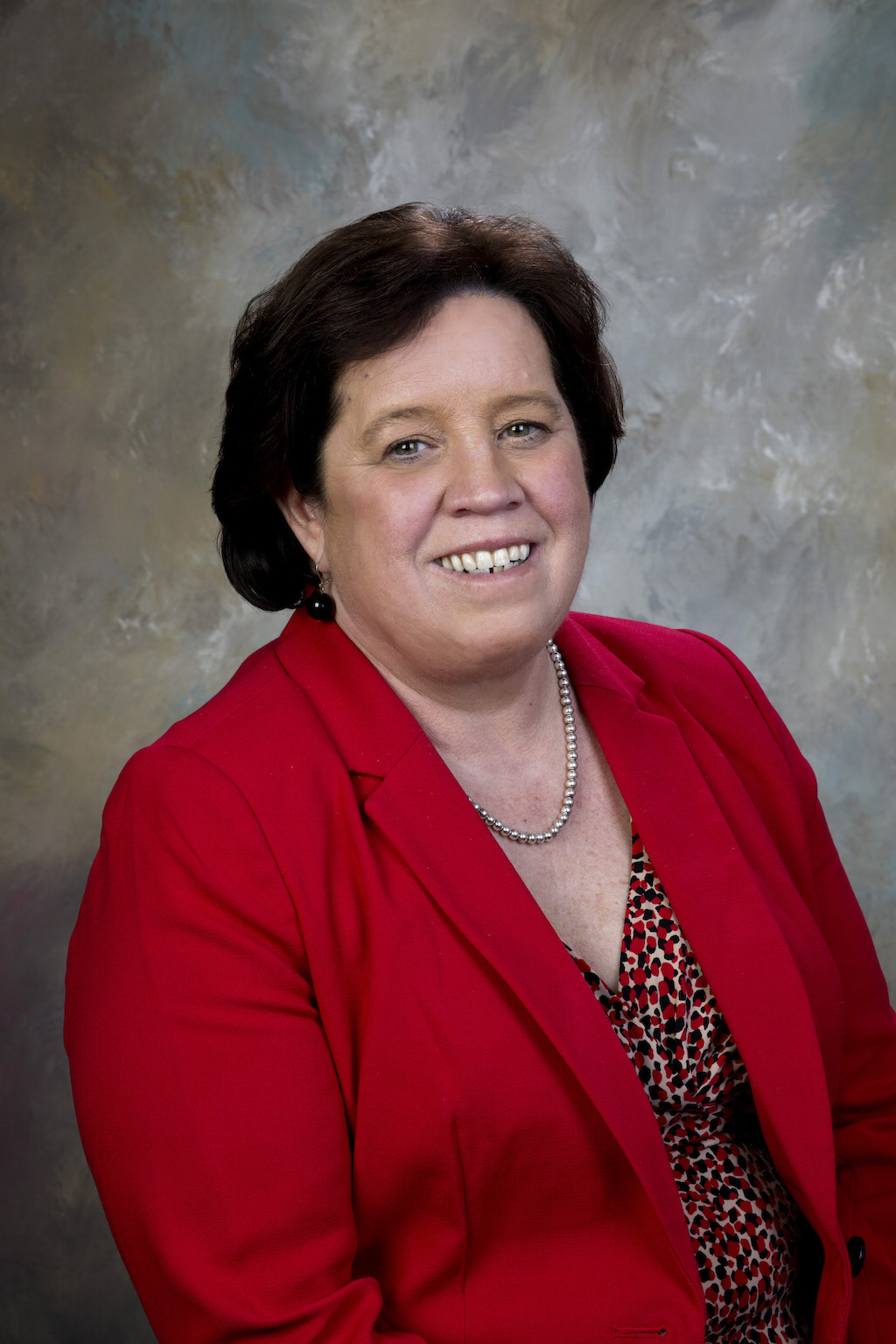
- Official portrait, 2015

Member of the Pennsylvania Liquor Control Board
- In office June 20, 2019 – February 7, 2024
- Appointed by: Tom Wolf
- Preceded by: Michael Newsome
- Succeeded by: Darrell L. Clarke

Chief of Staff to the Governor of Pennsylvania
- In office July 23, 2015 – January 31, 2017
- Governor: Tom Wolf
- Preceded by: Katie McGinty
- Succeeded by: Mike Brunelle

Pennsylvania Secretary of Legislative Affairs
- In office January 20, 2015 – July 23, 2015
- Governor: Tom Wolf
- Preceded by: Katie True
- Succeeded by: Will Danowski

Personal details
- Born: Kansas
- Party: Democratic

Mary Isenhour is an American political strategist, campaign manager, and government official who served as a member of the Pennsylvania Liquor Control Board from 2019 to 2024. A member of the Democratic Party, she served as the Chief of Staff to the Governor of Pennsylvania from 2015 to 2017, and the Pennsylvania Secretary of Legislative Affairs in 2015.

Isenhour also previously worked as executive director of the Pennsylvania House Democratic Campaign Committee, and started a political consulting firm with former state party chairman T.J. Rooney. In 2010, PoliticsPA called her "one of the top consultants in the state", and said, "few can move between the strategy of campaigning and its mechanics with the ease that she does".

Starting her career working on the Kansas House of Representatives staff, Isenhour eventually becoming chief of staff to House Minority Leader Tom Sawyer, and then director of the Democratic Party's Kansas Coordinated Campaign for legislative races. She worked as the national political director for the Democratic Legislative Campaign Committee before starting her Pennsylvania political career in 1999.

== Early career ==
A Kansas native, Isenhour attended the University of Kansas. She began her political career as a staffer in the Kansas House of Representatives. In 1990 she worked as a legislative aide to House Minority Leader Marvin Barkis, and the following year was an administrative assistant to House Majority Leader Donna Whiteman. From 1991 to 1995, Isenhour served as Chief of Staff to House Minority Leader Tom Sawyer, where she worked with Democratic and Republican lawmakers alike to advance legislation, served as a liaison between Sawyer and other officials, and worked with members of leadership and committees to develop legislative strategies and build coalitions. In 1992, Isenhour was the director of the Democratic Party's Kansas Coordinated Campaign for legislative races, both in the state House and Senate. Those races included more than three dozen candidates by July 1992.

From 1995 to 1999, Isenhour served as the Democratic Legislative Campaign Committee's national political director, based in Washington D.C. In that capacity, she worked with legislative leaders and caucus campaign staff in more 15 states to help win or preserve Democratic majorities in state legislatures. In 1996, she worked in Iowa to help orchestrate the Democratic legislative campaigns in that the Iowa General Assembly, partnering with Iowa Senate Majority Leader Wally Horn and other key legislative Democrats to improving the party's position. She described it as an attempt to avoid a repeat of 1994 elections, in which Democrats suffered major losses in both federal and state offices during the Republican Revolution. Isenhour said of those elections:

We were off track. We let the Republicans define what the message was, and they had the same message from top to bottom. ... Now it's our turn, and we're talking about what Democrats have always been about: that we stick up for the little guy. We've gone on the offensive instead of the defensive.

Isenhour also managed Sawyer's campaign for the bid for Kansas governor in 1998. Sawyer won the Democratic nomination, but ultimately lost in a landslide to the popular Republican incumbent, Bill Graves.

== Pennsylvania career ==
Isenhour began her Pennsylvania political career in 1999, when she became executive director of the Pennsylvania House Democratic Campaign Committee, helping to get Democratic candidates elected to the Pennsylvania House of Representatives. She held the position until 2003. Isenhour assisted with Bob Casey, Jr.'s successful 2006 campaign against Republican incumbent Rick Santorum, served as political adviser to state House Democratic Leader Frank Dermody, and ran Governor Ed Rendell's successful 2006 re-election campaign against challenger Lynn Swann, after which she helped plan Rendell's 2007 inauguration. Rendell appointed her to the Pennsylvania Community Service Advisory Board.

Isenhour worked for the Pennsylvania Democratic Party, serving as an aide and political adviser to T.J. Rooney, the state party chairman. In 2007, she became executive director of the party, replacing Don Morabito, who took a position in the Rendell administration. The party enjoyed much success during her time there, controlling the Governor's office, three of four statewide row offices, two U.S. Senators, a majority in the State House, and picking up five seats in the Congressional delegation. She served as director of PA Victory, a statewide coordinated campaign effort. Isenhour was also chosen as the Pennsylvania state director for Hillary Clinton's 2008 presidential campaign, after Rendell recommended her for the position. There was talk of Isenhour continuing to work with the Clinton administration after the primary, but she instead returned to her position with the Pennsylvania Democratic Party.

In 2008, Isenhour and Rooney met with MSNBC news commentator Chris Matthews to discuss the possibility of Matthews running against Republican U.S. Senator Arlen Specter, although he ultimately did not run. Also that year, Isenhour and her Republican counterpart Luke Bernstein, executive director of the Republican Party of Pennsylvania, together taught a class about presidential elections at the Dickinson College in Carlisle, Pennsylvania. Isenhour and Bernstein both believed it was the first class of its type, and said the two had a very cordial relationship despite representing opposite political parties. Isenhour also taught about electoral politics at other educational institutions, including the University of Pennsylvania, Central Penn College and The Washington Center.

In July 2010, after more than seven years leading the Pennsylvania Democratic Party, Isenhour and Rooney started the political consulting firm Isenhour Rooney Strategies, which later became Isenhour Rooney and Carey. Also in 2010, Isenhour was the only woman named to the PoliticsPA's Pennsylvania Top 10 Influencers List by Campaigns and Elections, PoliticsPA also called her "one of the top consultants in the state", and said "few can move between the strategy of campaigning and its mechanics with the ease that she does". Among the candidates she advised was Rob Teplitz in his successful campaign for Pennsylvania State Senate in 2012. Eisenhour served on the board of Planned Parenthood of Pennsylvania.

== Governor Wolf administration ==
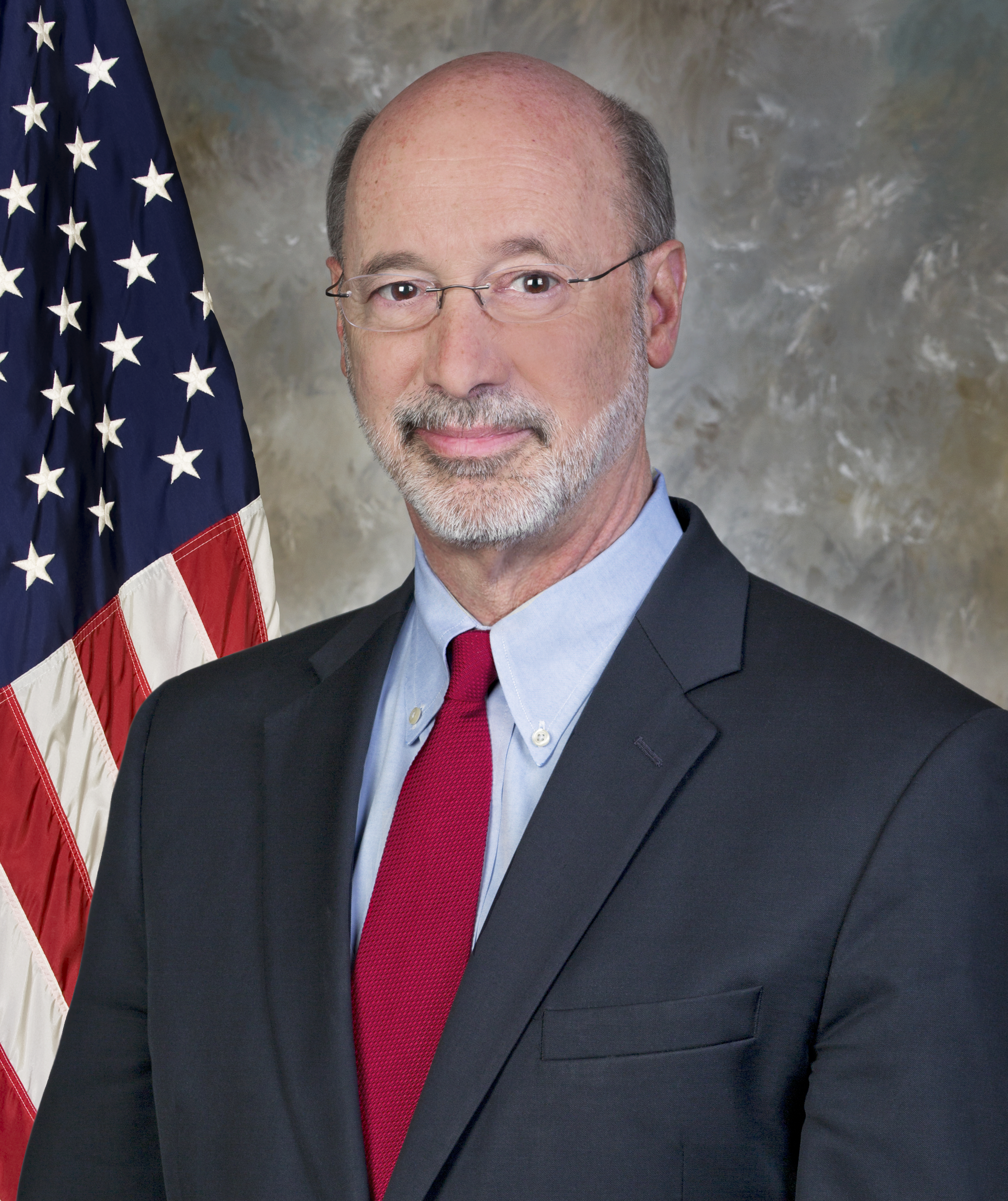
Mary Isenhour became the senior campaign adviser for Tom Wolf (pictured) in his bid for Pennsylvania governor.

Isenhour was an early supporter of Pennsylvania gubernatorial candidate Tom Wolf, and became Wolf's senior campaign adviser during his 2014 campaign, at a time when state Representative Allyson Schwartz and state Treasurer Rob McCord were considered to have better chances of winning. Isenhour, who had long been acquainted with Wolf, had not intended to become involved with a lengthy and work-intensive gubernatorial campaign, but said she was convinced to do so after an hour-long phone conversation with Wolf in 2013, after which she was convinced he was the right man for the job: "I've been in politics 30 years and I've never had a candidate like this." Isenhour maintained other clients during his campaign, but said Wolf was "my main focus for the next year and a half". After Wolf's successful election, Isenhour co-chaired his inaugural committee, then worked as his Secretary of Legislative Affairs, serving as a liaison during negotiating sessions at the Pennsylvania General Assembly, and providing key planning during the governor's budget strategy. Political reporter John L. Micek wrote of Isenhour: "She is in the unique position of having to work with Republicans she once ran campaigns against." Her annual salary in the position was $145,018. Isenhour developed a reputation for communicating and building relationships with legislative leaders and staff members from both parties.

In July 2015, Isenhour replaced Katie McGinty as Wolf's Chief of Staff, after McGinty resigned six months into her tenure to pursue a campaign for U.S. Senate. Wolf called Isenhour "one of my closest advisors" and "a valuable part of my administration", and said she "really understands how the politics of this place actually works." The selection was praised by both parties, including House and Senate Republicans, who expressed hope she would be less adversarial than McGinty. The Butler Eagle wrote an editorial criticizing the appointment due to her position on the Planned Parenthood of Pennsylvania board, in light of a national controversy over undercover videos about the group's alleged sale of aborted fetal body parts. Isenhour came into the Chief of Staff position more than three weeks into a budget impasse between Wolf and the Republican-controlled General Assembly.

In October 2015, four months into the state budget impasse, Isenhour issued a memo notifying Wolf's administration of a hiring freeze and travel ban. On February 3, 2016, Isenhour notified the state Public Employee Retirement Commission that, under Wolf's orders, all employment of its staff would be discontinued. State Representatives Stephen Bloom of Cumberland County and Seth Grove of York County have filed a lawsuit against Wolf challenging that action, arguing the governor lacks the power to dissolve the commission and acted contrary to the Pennsylvania Constitution.

On February 15, 2019, Governor Wolf nominated Isenhour to a seat on the Pennsylvania Liquor Control Board. She was confirmed by the state Senate on June 19, 2019 and became the first female to serve on the board.

== Personal life ==
Isenhour is married to Bill Patton, former chief of staff to Speaker of the Pennsylvania House of Representatives Dennis M. O'Brien. They reside in Harrisburg, Pennsylvania. She has a cat named Hank and enjoys cooking.
