= Senator Francisco =

Senator Francisco may refer to:

- Jim Francisco (1937–2018), Kansas State Senate
- Kenneth Francisco (1941–2013), Kansas State Senate
- Marci Francisco (born 1950), Kansas State Senate
