= 1982 Kansas gubernatorial election =

- November 2, 1982
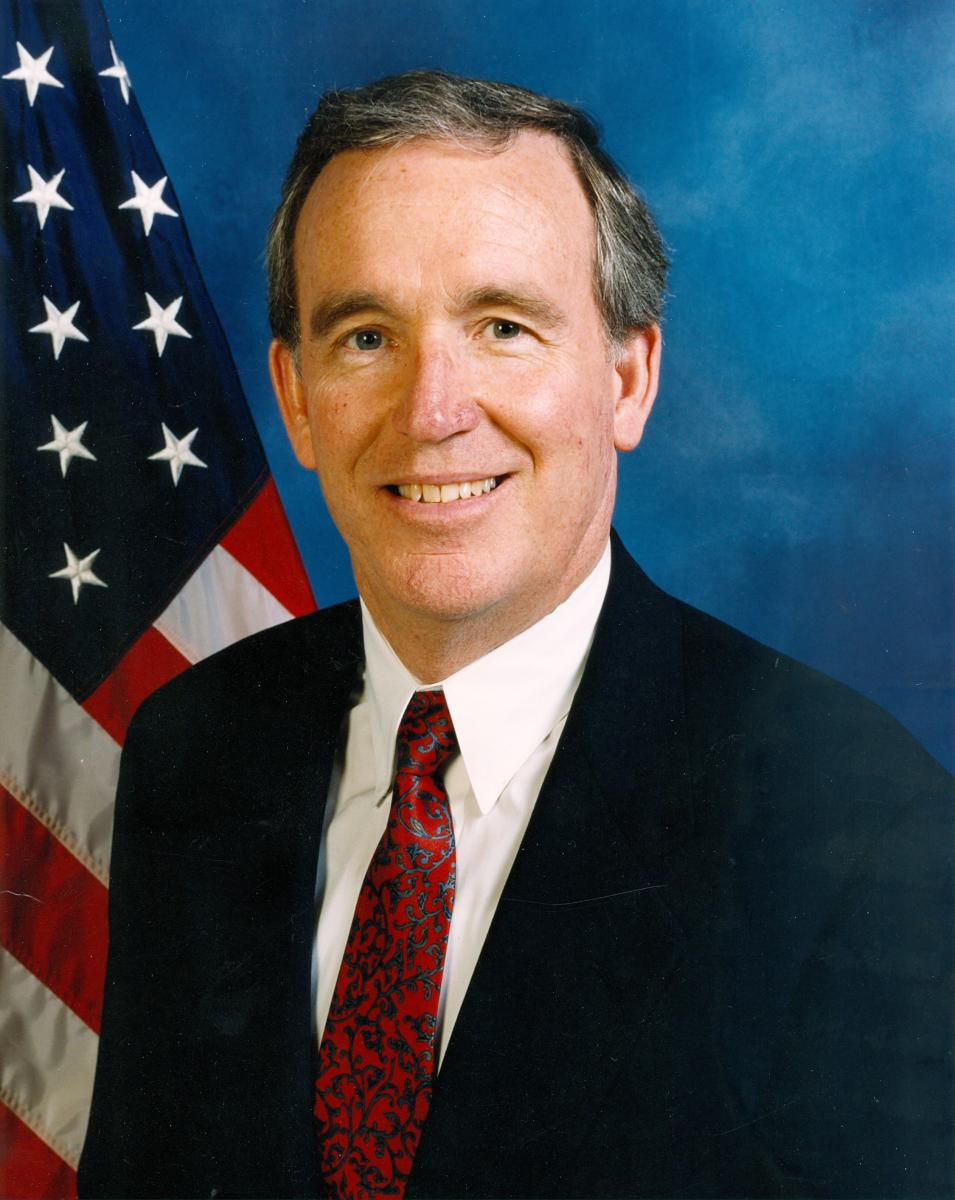

Nominee	John W. Carlin	Sam Hardage
Party	Democratic	Republican
Running mate	Thomas Docking	Dan Thiessen
Popular vote	405,772	339,356
Percentage	53.16%	44.46%
- County results Carlin: 40–50% 50–60% 60–70% 70–80% Hardage: 40–50% 50–60% 60–70% 70–80% 80–90%
Governor before election
John W. Carlin
Democratic
Elected Governor
John W. Carlin
Democratic

The 1982 Kansas gubernatorial election was held on November 2, 1982. Incumbent Democrat John W. Carlin defeated Republican nominee Sam Hardage with 53.2% of the vote. As of 2026, this was the most recent election in which a male Democrat was elected governor of Kansas.

== Primary elections ==
Primary elections were held on August 3, 1982.

=== Democratic primary ===
==== Candidates ====
- John W. Carlin, incumbent Governor
- Jimmy D. Montgomery

==== Results ====
Democratic primary results
Party	Candidate	Votes	%
Democratic	John W. Carlin (incumbent)	103,780	78.88
Democratic	Jimmy D. Montgomery	27,785	21.12
Total votes		131,565	100.00

=== Republican primary ===
==== Candidates ====
- Sam Hardage, businessman
- Dave Owen, former Lieutenant Governor
- Wendell Lady, Speaker of the Kansas House of Representatives
- Louis A. Klemp Jr., Leavenworth County Commissioner
- Bill Huffman

==== Results ====
Republican primary results
Party	Candidate	Votes	%
Republican	Sam Hardage	86,692	36.76
Republican	Dave Owen	79,770	33.83
Republican	Wendell Lady	61,419	26.04
Republican	Louis A. Klemp Jr.	4,113	1.74
Republican	Bill Huffman	3,834	1.63
Total votes		235,828	100.00

== General election ==
=== Candidates ===
Major party candidates

- John W. Carlin, Democratic
- Sam Hardage, Republican

Other candidates

- James H. Ward, Libertarian
- Frank W. Shelton Jr., American
- Warren C. Martin, Prohibition

=== Results ===
1982 Kansas gubernatorial election
Party	Candidate	Votes	%	±%
Democratic	John W. Carlin (incumbent)	405,772	53.16%	
Republican	Sam Hardage	339,356	44.46%	
Libertarian	James H. Ward	7,595	1.00%	
American	Frank W. Shelton Jr.	6,136	0.80%	
Prohibition	Warren C. Martin	4,404	0.58%	
Majority		66,416		
Turnout		763,263		
Democratic hold		Swing		
