= Gary Sherrer (Kansas politician) =

American politician

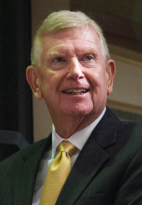

45th Lieutenant Governor of Kansas
- In office July 18, 1996 – January 13, 2003
- Governor: Bill Graves
- Preceded by: Sheila Frahm
- Succeeded by: John E. Moore

42nd Chair of the National Lieutenant Governors Association
- In office 2001–2002
- Preceded by: Steve Henry
- Succeeded by: Charles Fogarty

Personal details
- Born: September 3, 1940 (age 86)
- Party: Republican
- Education: Emporia State University

Gary Sherrer (born September 3, 1940) is an American former politician. He was the 45th Lieutenant Governor of Kansas from 1996 to 2003. He is an alumnus of Emporia State University.

Party political offices
Preceded by Sheila Frahm	Republican nominee for Lieutenant Governor of Kansas; 1998	Succeeded by Dave Lindstrom
Political offices
Preceded by Jim Francisco	Lieutenant Governor of Kansas; 1996–2003	Succeeded by John E. Moore
