= 2008 United States Senate election in Kansas =

- November 4, 2008
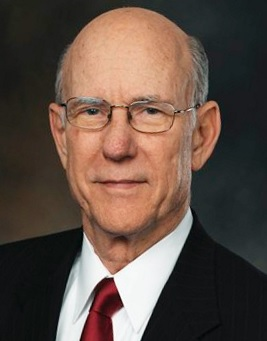

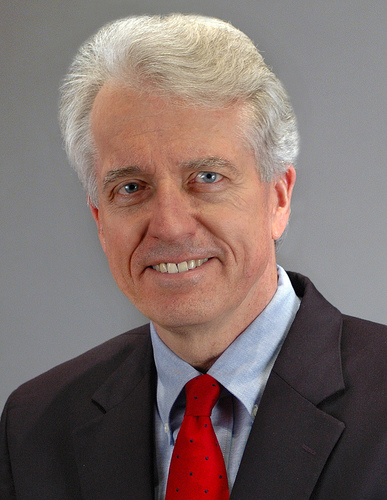
| Nominee | Pat Roberts | Jim Slattery |
| Party | Republican | Democratic |
| Popular vote | 712,396 | 429,691 |
| Percentage | 60.06% | 36.46% |
- County results Roberts: 40–50% 50–60% 60–70% 70–80% 80–90% >90% Slattery: 40–50% 50–60% 60–70%
U.S. senator before election
Pat Roberts
Republican
Elected U.S. Senator
Pat Roberts
Republican

The 2008 United States Senate election in Kansas was held on November 4, 2008. Incumbent Republican U.S. Senator Pat Roberts won re-election to a third term.

As of 2026, this is the last time a Democratic candidate won Atchison County in a US Senate election.

== Background ==
The state of Kansas had not elected a Democrat to the U.S. Senate since 1932. Kansas's other Republican Senator Sam Brownback announced that he was retiring due to "self-imposed term limits," which meant Roberts became the senior senator from Kansas in 2011. It is considered one of the most Republican states in the U.S. The last time its electors went to a Democrat was the presidential election of 1964, when Lyndon Johnson carried the state over Barry Goldwater.

Roberts had announced ahead of the 1996 election that "I plan only to serve two terms in the U.S. Senate", but he broke that pledge in this election.

== Republican primary ==
=== Candidates ===
- Pat Roberts, incumbent U.S. senator

=== Results ===
Republican Party primary results
| Party | Candidate | Votes | % |
|---|---|---|---|
| Republican | Pat Roberts (incumbent) | 214,911 | 100.00% |
| Total votes | | 214,911 | 100.00% |

== Democratic primary ==
=== Candidates ===
- Lee Jones, nominee for the U.S. Senate in 2004
- Jim Slattery, former U.S. representative and nominee for governor in 1994

=== Results ===
Democratic primary results
| Party | Candidate | Votes | % |
|---|---|---|---|
| Democratic | Jim Slattery | 68,106 | 68.93% |
| Democratic | Lee Jones | 30,699 | 31.07% |
| Total votes | | 98,805 | 100.00% |

== General election ==
=== Candidates ===
- Randall Hodgkinson (L), attorney
- Joseph L. Martin (Re), nominee for secretary of state in 2006
- Pat Roberts (R), incumbent U.S. senator
- Jim Slattery (D), former U.S. representative

=== Predictions ===
| Source | Ranking | As of |
|---|---|---|
| The Cook Political Report | Safe R | October 23, 2008 |
| CQ Politics | Likely R | October 31, 2008 |
| Rothenberg Political Report | Safe R | November 2, 2008 |
| Real Clear Politics | Safe R | November 4, 2008 |

=== Polling ===
| Poll source | Dates administered | Slattery | Roberts |
|---|---|---|---|
| Rasmussen Reports | May 13, 2008 | 40% | 52% |
| Research 2000/Daily Kos | June 2–4, 2008 | 38% | 50% |
| Cooper & Secrest | June 5–8, 2008 | 36% | 48% |
| Rasmussen Reports | June 11, 2008 | 39% | 48% |
| TargetPoint Consulting, Inc. | July 1, 2008 | 34% | 54% |
| Rasmussen Reports | July 15, 2008 | 33% | 61% |
| Rasmussen Reports | August 11, 2008 | 37% | 56% |
| Survey USA | August 20, 2008 | 31% | 58% |
| Survey USA | September 22, 2008 | 35% | 55% |
| Rasmussen Reports | September 23, 2008 | 38% | 58% |
| Rasmussen Reports | October 13, 2008 | 36% | 55% |
| Survey USA | October 22, 2008 | 35% | 57% |
| Survey USA | October 28, 2008 | 33% | 60% |

=== Results ===
County flips: Democratic Flip / Republican Hold

General election results
| Party | Candidate | Votes | % | ±% |
|---|---|---|---|---|
| Republican | Pat Roberts (incumbent) | 727,121 | 60.06% | −22.46% |
| Democratic | Jim Slattery | 441,399 | 36.46% | +36.46% |
| Libertarian | Randall Hodgkinson | 25,727 | 2.12% | −6.98% |
| Reform | Joseph L. Martin | 16,443 | 1.36% | −7.02% |
| Majority | | 285,722 | 23.60% | −49.82% |
| Turnout | | 1,210,690 | | |
| Republican hold | | Swing | | |

==== Counties that flipped from Republican to Democratic ====
- Douglas (largest city: Lawrence)
- Wyandotte (largest city: Kansas City)
- Atchison (largest city: Atchison)

== See also ==
- 2008 United States Senate elections
