= Jim Slattery =

American politician

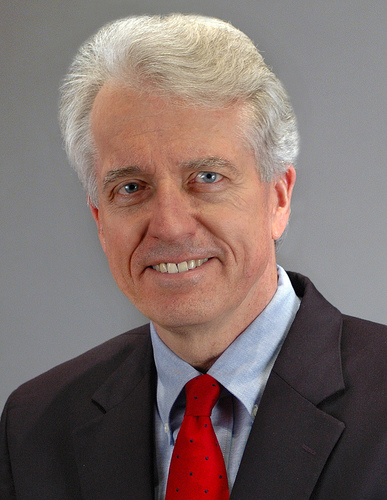

Member of the U.S. House of Representatives from Kansas's 2nd district
- In office January 3, 1983 – January 3, 1995
- Preceded by: Jim Jeffries
- Succeeded by: Sam Brownback

Member of the Kansas House of Representatives from the 53rd district
- In office January 8, 1973 – January 8, 1979
- Preceded by: Glee Jones
- Succeeded by: Vic Miller

Personal details
- Born: James Charles Slattery; August 4, 1948 (age 78) Good Intent, Kansas, U.S.
- Party: Democratic
- Spouse: Linda Slattery
- Education: Washburn University (BS, JD)

Military service
- Allegiance: United States
- Branch/service: United States Army
- Years of service: 1970–1975
- Rank: Second Lieutenant
- Unit: 69th Infantry Brigade; Kansas Army National Guard
- Battles/wars: Vietnam War

James Charles Slattery (born August 4, 1948) is an American politician. He served in the U.S. House of Representatives from 1983 to 1995 representing Kansas's 2nd congressional district as a Democrat, was the Democratic nominee for governor in 1994 and was the Democratic nominee for U.S. Senator in 2008.

== Early life, education, and early career ==
After serving in the United States Army, Slattery earned a Juris Doctor (J.D.) from Washburn University School of Law in 1974. While at Washburn, he was a member of the Kansas Beta chapter of Phi Delta Theta. In 1982, Slattery was inducted into Washburn's prestigious Sagamore Society.

Prior to his election to the Congress, Slattery served in the Kansas House of Representatives, as a reserve Army officer and founded a successful real estate company.

== U.S. House of Representatives ==
=== Elections ===
1982

Incumbent two term Republican Jim Jeffries of Kansas's 2nd congressional district decided to retire. Then-State Representative Slattery decided to run and defeated Republican nominee Morris Kay 57%-43%.

1984

He won re-election to a second term against Jim Van Slyke with 60% of the vote, winning every county except Clay.

1986–1990

Over the next few years, he won re-election with no problem in 1986 (71%), 1988 (73%), and 1990 (63%)/

1992

After redistricting, he represented more counties in the southeastern part of the state. He defeated Jim Van Slyke 56%-41%. He performed strongly in the northern part of the district, but did poorly in the southern part, mostly new territory for Slattery. He lost two counties: Coffey and Linn while winning five counties with less than a 50% majority: Wilson, Woodson, Allen, Bourbon, and Franklin counties.

=== Tenure ===
Slattery served in the U.S. House of Representatives from 1983 to 1995 in the Kansas delegation. He was a central player on many key issues, including environmental protection, health care, telecommunications, and budget cutting efforts. He worked to limit production of the B-2 bomber, and was the chief sponsor of the successful amendment to terminate spending on the Superconducting Super Collider in 1993.

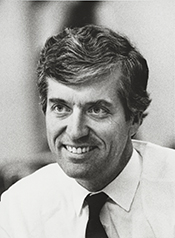
Slattery during his time in Congress

Slattery gained success as a Democrat in a relatively conservative congressional district, Kansas's 2nd congressional district. He considered running for governor in 1990 against incumbent Gov. Mike Hayden, an unpopular governor following changes in property tax law. Slattery decided not to run in 1990, however, and Joan Finney became the first female governor of Kansas.

In 1993, Slattery orchestrated the House campaign that killed the Superconducting Super Collider. The SSC would have been about three times as powerful as CERN's Large Hadron Collider, most notable for discovering a particle consistent with a Higgs boson.

=== Committee assignments ===
Slattery served on the Energy & Commerce, Veterans' Affairs, Budget, and Banking Committees.

== 1994 gubernatorial election ==
Finney served one term as governor, and Slattery decided to run for the open governorship in 1994, stepping down from Congress. However, he faced Republican Bill Graves. Slattery lost that race, a victim of the Republican landslide of 1994.

== Post-congressional career ==
=== Law career ===
Slattery lived in Virginia and was a partner in a Washington, D.C. law firm, Wiley Rein LLP after his defeat. In 2019, he left Wiley Rein, where he had worked for more than two decades, to start his own firm, Slattery Strategy. He has also done various consulting and pro bono work, including successfully advocating for the release of a Princeton University student who had been imprisoned in Iran.

His youngest son, Mike Slattery, lives in Mission, Kansas. Mike was elected to the Kansas State House in 2008, defeating his Republican opponent Ronnie Metzker. Mike edged out fellow Democrat Andy Sandler by three votes in a hotly contested primary.

=== 2008 U.S. Senate campaign ===
Slattery declared his intention to run for the United States Senate in March 2008 against incumbent Pat Roberts, and officially announced his run in a statewide tour on April 29.

After winning the Democratic primary, Slattery was defeated by Roberts. The loss was the 25th consecutive setback for Democratic candidates running for U.S. Senate seats from Kansas (24 regular elections plus a 1996 special election following the resignation of Bob Dole). Until Adam Hamilton was elected in 2026, the last Democrat to win a Senate election in Kansas was George McGill in 1932.

=== Iran ===
In February 2015, Slattery claimed to have visited Iran in December 2014 from an invitation by the Iranian government where he attended the World Against Violence and Extremism conference making him the first American lawmaker to visit the country after the Iranian Revolution. He claimed to have met with then-President of Iran Hassan Rouhani stating that Rouhani was "deeply committed to improving this relationship with the United States". The visit came at a time during negotiations leading to the Joint Comprehensive Plan of Action.

In 2019, Slattery assisted with the release of Xiyue Wang, a Princeton University student who was imprisoned in Iran from 2016 to 2019 after being accused of espionage.

U.S. House of Representatives
Preceded by Jim Jeffries	Member of the U.S. House of Representatives from Kansas's 2nd congressional district 1983–1995	Succeeded by Sam Brownback
Party political offices
Preceded by Joan Finney	Democratic nominee for Governor of Kansas; 1994	Succeeded by Tom Sawyer
Vacant Title last held by Sally Thompson; 1996	Democratic nominee for U.S. Senator from Kansas (Class 2); 2008	Succeeded by Chad Taylor
U.S. order of precedence (ceremonial)
Preceded by Bob Whittaker as Former U.S. Representative	Order of precedence of the United States as Former U.S. Representative	Succeeded by David Skaggs as Former U.S. Representative
