= Governor Graves =

Governor Graves may refer to:

- Bibb Graves (1873–1942), 38th Governor of Alabama
- Bill Graves (born 1953), 43rd Governor of Kansas
- Thomas Graves, 1st Baron Graves (1725–1802), Governor of Newfoundland from 1761 to 1764
