= Tim Holden =

American politician (1957–2026)

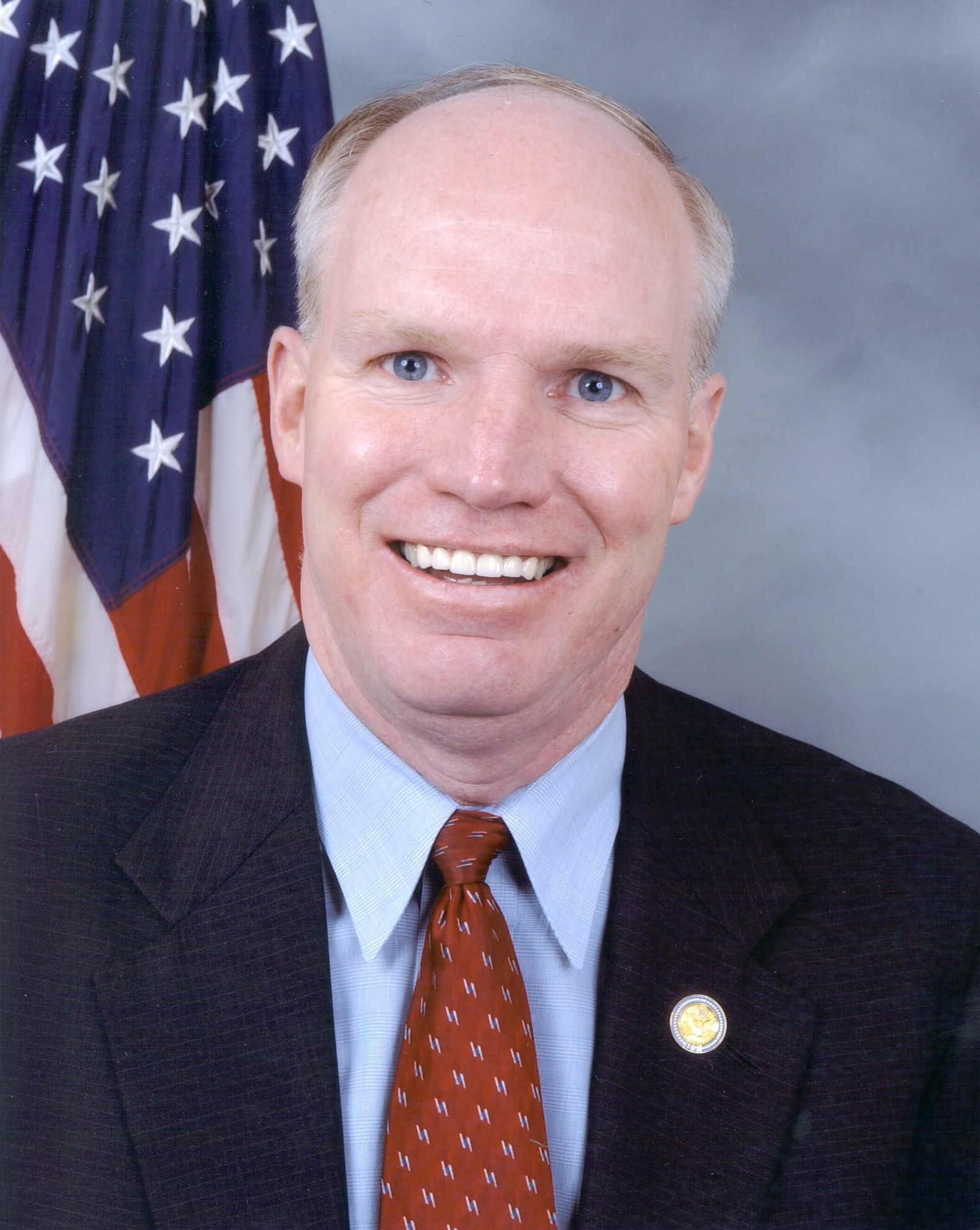
- Official portrait, 2005

Chair of the Pennsylvania Liquor Control Board
- In office February 17, 2015 – November 21, 2024
- Appointed by: Tom Wolf
- Preceded by: Skip Brion
- Succeeded by: Darrell L. Clarke

Member of the Pennsylvania Liquor Control Board
- In office November 13, 2013 – November 21, 2024
- Appointed by: Tom Corbett
- Preceded by: P. J. Stapleton
- Succeeded by: Vacant

Member of the U.S. House of Representatives from Pennsylvania
- In office January 3, 1993 – January 3, 2013
- Preceded by: Gus Yatron
- Succeeded by: Matt Cartwright
- Constituency: 6th district (1993–2003); 17th district (2003–2013)

Personal details
- Born: Thomas Timothy Holden; March 5, 1957 Pottsville, Pennsylvania, U.S.
- Died: November 15, 2026 (aged 69) St. Clair, Pennsylvania, U.S.
- Party: Democratic
- Spouse: Gwen Holden (m. 1993; died 2026)
- Education: Bloomsburg University (BA)

Thomas Timothy Holden (March 5, 1957 – November 15, 2026) was an American politician from Pennsylvania who served as a Democratic U.S. representative for Pennsylvania's 17th congressional district from 1993 to 2013. Holden was the dean of the Pennsylvania congressional delegation during the 112th United States Congress. On April 24, 2012, Holden was defeated in the Democratic primary in his attempt to run for re-election after the boundaries of his district were redrawn. He then became chairman of the Pennsylvania Liquor Control Board in 2015, a position he held until he retired at the end of his term in 2024.

== Early life, education, and early career ==
Holden was born in Pottsville, Pennsylvania, on March 5, 1957, and was a lifelong resident of St. Clair, Pennsylvania. He graduated from St. Clair Area High School in 1975. In 1980, he received a bachelor's degree in sociology from Bloomsburg University of Pennsylvania. He was a Roman Catholic.

Holden became a licensed real estate agent, and later an insurance broker in 1983. He worked as a probation officer and as Sergeant-at-Arms for the Pennsylvania House of Representatives, and was the sheriff of Schuylkill County from 1985 to 1993.

== U.S. House of Representatives ==
=== Elections ===
In the 1990s, he represented Pennsylvania's 6th congressional district based in Reading and including Berks and Schuylkill Counties. The district was populated mostly by Reagan Democrats who were still willing to vote Republican in most elections (it voted for George H. W. Bush in 1992, Bob Dole in 1996 and George W. Bush in 2000), but Holden was re-elected four times without serious opposition.

After redistricting in 1992 following the 1990 United States census, incumbent Democratic U.S. congressman Gus Yatron decided to retire. In the Democratic primary, Holden defeated the mayor of Reading, Pennsylvania, Warren Haggerty, and John Reusing, 39% to 32% to 28%. In the general election, he defeated Republican nominee John E. Jones III, a local government solicitor, 52% to 48%. In 1994, Holden won re-election to a second term by defeating Republican nominee Fred Levering 57% to 43%. He won re-election to a third term in 1996 by defeating Republican nominee Christian Leinbach, a staffer to U.S. senator Rick Santorum, 59% to 41%.

Holden won re-election to a fourth term by defeating Republican nominee John Meckley 61% to 39%. He won re-election to a fifth term by defeating Republican nominee Thomas Kopel 66% to 34%.

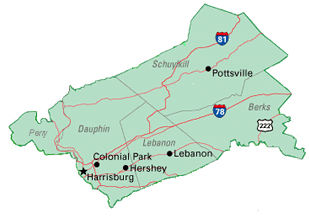
The 17th congressional district from 2003 to 2013, represented by Holden.

Two of Pennsylvania's congressional districts were eliminated after the 2000 United States census. The Republican-controlled General Assembly dismantled the 6th district, splitting its territory among three other districts. The legislature considered placing Holden's home in Schuylkill County in the 11th district, a heavily Democratic area in northeastern Pennsylvania. This would have forced a primary matchup with Paul Kanjorski, an eight-term Democrat who was slightly more liberal than Holden. Eventually, it moved the largest portion of Holden's old district, including his home, to the Republican-leaning Harrisburg-based 17th district, represented by ten-term Republican George Gekas.

On paper, the redrawn 17th district appeared to heavily favor Gekas that it appeared unwinnable for a Democrat, even one as conservative as Holden. To some, it was blatant gerrymandering to force Holden into retirement. Gekas retained 60% of his former territory, and George W. Bush had carried the newly drawn district with 57% of the vote in 2000. However, Holden chose not to retire, instead opting to run in a district that was 65% new to him (a small corner from the even more Republican 9th District was moved to the 17th). Gekas was forced into a competitive campaign. Holden managed to gain endorsements from much of Gekas's old base, much to Gekas's surprise, including Gekas's hometown paper, The Patriot-News, saying that the 17th was not the same district that elected Gekas in 1982. Holden also visited African-American neighborhoods, such as Uptown and Allison Hill, after discovering that Gekas had never visited these neighborhoods during his congressional career. He asked the residents of these neighborhoods not to vote for a congressman who did not bother to visit them. In November 2002, Holden narrowly defeated Gekas.

In 2004, Holden ran for re-election against Republican lawyer Scott Paterno, son of former Penn State football coach Joe Paterno. Paterno was actively supported by influential Republicans, and President Bush and Vice President Dick Cheney visited the district several times to support him. Holden won re-election by a comfortable margin.

Holden faced Republican Matthew Wertz, an Afghanistan War veteran, in 2006. However, Wertz withdrew before the general election citing personal reasons and Holden went on to easily win re-election with 65% of the total vote. In 2008, he faced Republican Toni Gilhooley, a retired Pennsylvania State Trooper and 25-year veteran of the force, whom he defeated with 64% of the vote (one percent less than the previous election).

In 2010, Holden was challenged by the Republican nominee, State Senator Dave Argall, whose state senate district covered much of the eastern portion of the congressional district, including Holden's home. Unlike other Democrats in Eastern Pennsylvania like Paul Kanjorski, Chris Carney and Patrick Murphy, Holden won re-election with a 12-point margin, defeating Argall 56% to 44%.

Before Holden won the general election, he faced a primary challenge within his own party from political activist Sheila Dow Ford, who ran to the left of Holden, criticizing the congressman for voting against the Affordable Care Act in March 2010. Holden defeated Ford by a margin of 65% to 35% in the primary to regain the Democratic nomination.

In 2012, Holden's district was drastically reconfigured as a result of legislative redistricting done in the Pennsylvania legislature in late 2011 following the results of the 2010 Census. The district lost Harrisburg and Lebanon, along with its shares of portions of Berks, Dauphin, Lebanon and Perry Counties. The legislature moved the district to the north and east, adding Scranton, Wilkes-Barre, Pittston, and Easton, among other various towns in Luzerne, Lackawanna, Carbon, Monroe and Northampton Counties. Holden found himself running in territory that he did not know and that did not know him. The only county retained from his old district was his home county, Schuylkill County. As a result of these changes, the 17th was now considerably more Democratic than its predecessor, nearing 60 percent Democratic registration and leaving Holden vulnerable to a challenge to his left in the Democratic primary. Also, the League of Conservation Voters put Holden on their "Dirty Dozen" list, targeting him for supporting former President George W. Bush's energy policy, favoring oil production, and opposing President Barack Obama's policies including development of clean energy.

In the April 24 primary, Holden lost to Moosic attorney Matt Cartwright, a considerably more liberal Democrat. Holden's opposition to the Affordable Care Act and climate-change legislation were believed to have contributed to his defeat. He also could not overcome the demographics of the redrawn district, which was almost 80 percent new to him.

=== Tenure ===
Holden was a member of the Blue Dog Coalition. He was a somewhat conservative Democrat who often opposed his party's voting trend, especially on social issues. For instance, he opposed abortion and gun control. However, he supported Democratic priorities on a number of issues. While Holden voted with a minority of House Democrats in favor of the authorization for the use of U.S. force in Iraq in October 2002, he opposed George W. Bush's Iraq War troop surge in January 2007.

While Holden voted against the Affordable Care Act, the signature legislative domestic policy achievement of President Barack Obama, in March 2010, he did vote for the American Recovery and Reinvestment Act, signed into law by Obama, in February 2009. While Holden voted for legislation supported by President Bush that toughened bankruptcy laws and enacted the Energy Policy Act of 2005, he voted for the Dodd–Frank Wall Street Reform and Consumer Protection Act, signed into law by President Obama, in July 2010. According to opencongreess.com, Holden voted with the Democratic leadership in Congress 73 percent of the time during his last years in the house. He was ranked as one of the top fifteen most conservative Democrats in the House by the National Journal.

In 2011, Holden became a co-sponsor of Bill H.R.3261, otherwise known as the Stop Online Piracy Act. Holden withdrew his co-sponsorship of SOPA on January 18, 2012.

=== Committee assignments ===
- Committee on Agriculture
  - Subcommittee on Conservation, Energy, and Forestry (Ranking Member)
  - Subcommittee on Livestock, Dairy, and Poultry
- Committee on Transportation and Infrastructure
  - Subcommittee on Aviation
  - Subcommittee on Highways and Transit

=== Caucus memberships ===
- German-American Caucus; Holden co-founded the caucus with Representative Jim Gerlach (R-Pennsylvania)
- Congressional Arts Caucus
- Blue Dog Coalition

== Later career ==
Holden was nominated to the Pennsylvania Liquor Control Board (PLCB) by Governor Tom Corbett on June 14, 2013. He was unanimously confirmed by the Pennsylvania State Senate on November 13, 2013. He was named chairman of the PLCB by Governor Tom Wolf on February 17, 2015. He was unanimously confirmed for a second term by the State Senate on June 29, 2016, and sworn in on July 11, 2016. He continued serving until his term in 2024 expired, when he retired. He was succeeded by Darrell L. Clarke.

== Personal life ==
Holden and his wife, Gwen, married in 1993. She died on April 27, 2026.

Holden died at his home in St. Clair, Pennsylvania, on November 15, 2026, at the age of 69.

U.S. House of Representatives
Preceded by Gus Yatron	Member of the U.S. House of Representatives from Pennsylvania's 6th congressional district 1993–2003	Succeeded by Jim Gerlach
Preceded by George Gekas	Member of the U.S. House of Representatives from Pennsylvania's 17th congressional district 2003–2013	Succeeded by Matt Cartwright
