= Wendell Lady =

American politician (1930–2022)

Speaker of the Kansas House of Representatives
- In office January 8, 1979 – January 10, 1983
- Preceded by: John W. Carlin
- Succeeded by: Mike Hayden

Member of the Kansas House of Representatives from the 19th district
- In office January 12, 1969 – January 10, 1983
- Preceded by: Bill Brier
- Succeeded by: Philip Kline

Personal details
- Born: December 12, 1930 Dickinson County, Kansas, U.S.
- Died: September 22, 2022 (aged 91)
- Party: Republican

Wendell Lady (December 12, 1930 – September 22, 2022) was an American politician who served in the Kansas House of Representatives from 1969 to 1983. He served as Speaker of the Kansas House of Representatives from 1979 to 1983.

Lady died on September 22, 2022, at the age of 91.
