= Jack Brier =

American politician

27th Secretary of State of Kansas
- In office May 10, 1978 – January 12, 1987
- Governor: Robert Frederick Bennett; John W. Carlin
- Preceded by: Elwill Shanahan
- Succeeded by: Bill Graves

Personal details
- Born: June 25, 1946 (age 80) Kansas City, Missouri
- Party: Republican

Jack Brier (born June 25, 1946) is an American politician who served as the Secretary of State of Kansas from 1978 to 1987.

Party political offices
| Preceded by Elwill Shanahan | Republican nominee for Secretary of State of Kansas; 1978, 1982 | Succeeded by Bill Graves |
