= Benny Boman =

American politician

Member of the Kansas House of Representatives from the 95th district
- In office 2011–2012
- Preceded by: Melany Barnes
- Succeeded by: Tom Sawyer

Personal details
- Born: December 16, 1934 (age 91)
- Party: Republican

Benny L. Boman (born December 16, 1934) is an American politician who served one term in the Kansas House of Representatives as a Republican from the 95th district during 2011 and 2012.

Boman ran in the 2010 election and faced no opposition in the primary. During the general election, he faced off against Democrat Melany Barnes and Libertarian Randall Batson. Boman took 50% of the vote, with 45% for Barnes and 5% for Batson, to win the election. He served one term in the Kansas House and ran for re-election; he similarly faced no primary opposition, but this time was defeated in the general by Tom Sawyer, 57% to 43%.
