= Elwill Shanahan =

American politician

Elwill M. Shanahan

26th Secretary of State of Kansas
- In office April 28, 1966 – May 10, 1978
- Governor: William H. Avery; Robert Docking; Robert Frederick Bennett
- Preceded by: Paul R. Shanahan
- Succeeded by: Jack Brier

Personal details
- Born: September 22, 1912 Salina, Kansas
- Died: October 5, 1983 (aged 71) Topeka, Kansas
- Party: Republican

Elwill M. Shanahan (September 22, 1912 – October 5, 1983) was an American politician who served as the Secretary of State of Kansas from 1966 to 1978.

She died of cancer on October 5, 1983, in Topeka, Kansas at age 71.

Party political offices
Preceded by Paul R. Shanahan	Republican nominee for Secretary of State of Kansas; 1966, 1968, 1970, 1972, 1974	Succeeded by Jack Brier
