= Paul Dugan =

American politician

Paul V. Dugan

Member of the Kansas House of Representatives
- In office 1969–1973

40th Lieutenant Governor of Kansas
- In office January 8, 1979 – January 10, 1983
- Governor: John W. Carlin
- Preceded by: Shelby Smith
- Succeeded by: Thomas Docking

Personal details
- Born: January 1, 1939 (age 87) near Wichita, Kansas, U.S.
- Party: Democratic
- Education: Regis College, Washburn University
- Occupation: Lawyer

Paul V. Dugan (born January 1, 1939) is an American Democratic politician. He served as a member of the Kansas House of Representatives from 1969 to 1973, then as the 40th Lieutenant Governor of Kansas from 1979 to 1983. He attended Regis College, earning a business administration degree, and Washburn University in Topeka for a law degree.

Party political offices
Preceded by Jack Steineger	Democratic nominee for Lieutenant Governor of Kansas; 1978	Succeeded by Thomas Docking
Political offices
Preceded by Shelby Smith	Lieutenant Governor of Kansas; 1979–1983	Succeeded by Thomas Docking
