= Richard Gannon =

American politician

Member of the Kansas Senate from the 40th district
- In office 1977 – July 11, 1988
- Preceded by: J.C. Tillotson
- Succeeded by: Sheila Frahm

Personal details
- Born: July 29, 1950 (age 75) Goodland, Kansas, U.S.
- Party: Democratic
- Spouse: Martha Ellen Wall

Richard G. Gannon (born July 29, 1950) is an American former politician who served in the Kansas State Senate as a Democrat from 1977 to 1988.
