= Sheila Frahm =

American politician (born 1945)

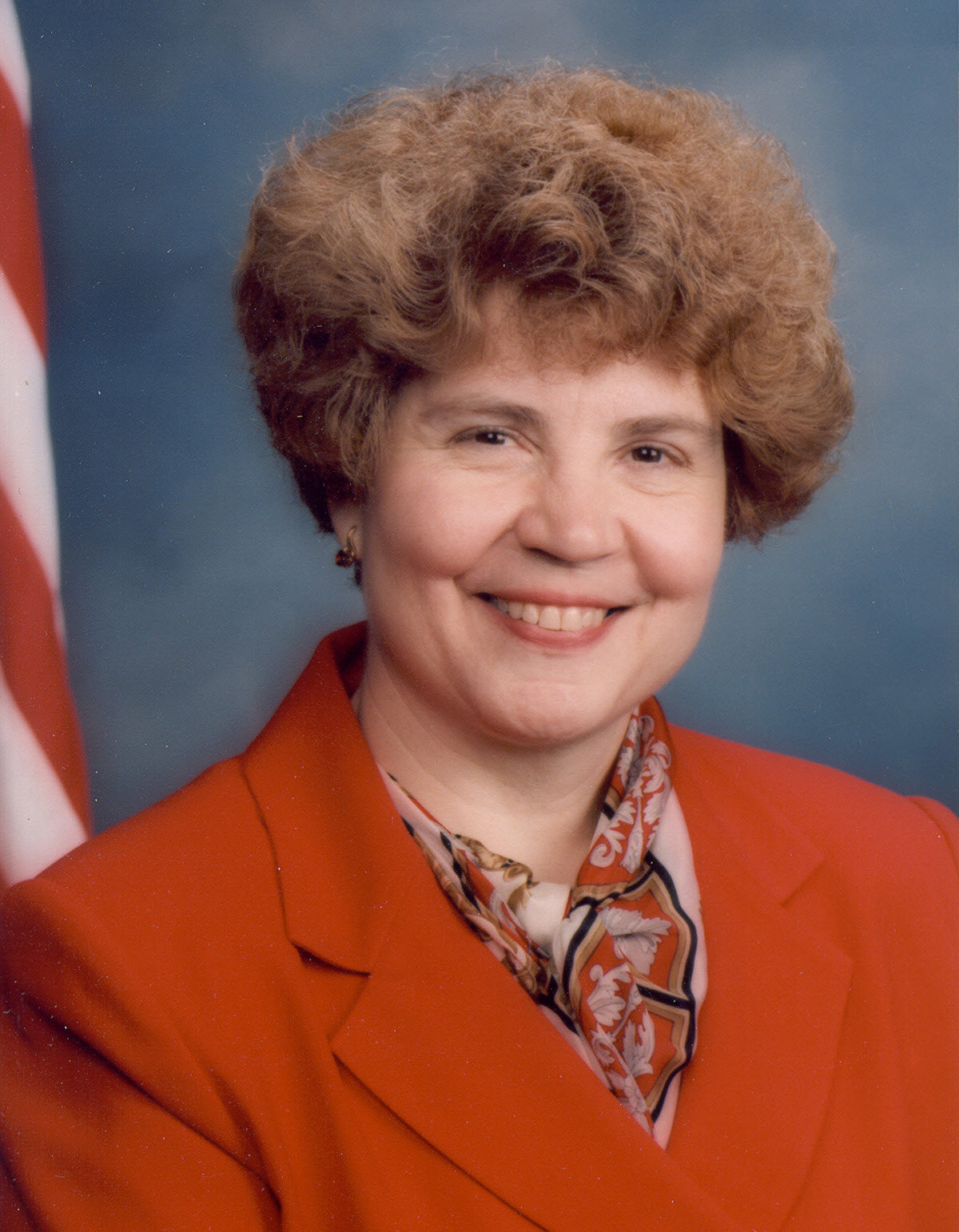

United States Senator from Kansas
- In office June 11, 1996 – November 7, 1996
- Appointed by: Bill Graves
- Preceded by: Bob Dole
- Succeeded by: Sam Brownback

44th Lieutenant Governor of Kansas
- In office January 9, 1995 – June 11, 1996
- Governor: Bill Graves
- Preceded by: Jim Francisco
- Succeeded by: Gary Sherrer

Member of the Kansas Senate from the 40th district
- In office January 9, 1989 – January 9, 1995
- Preceded by: Richard Gannon
- Succeeded by: Stan Clark

Personal details
- Born: Sheila Sloan; March 22, 1945 (age 81) Colby, Kansas, U.S.
- Party: Republican
- Spouse: Kenneth Frahm
- Education: Fort Hays State University (BA); University of Texas, Austin (attended)

Sheila Frahm (née Sloan; born March 22, 1945) is an American politician who served in the United States Senate as a Republican from Kansas for a brief period in 1996.

== Life and career ==
Frahm was born in Colby, Kansas. In 1979, she served as a member of the town school board. She was appointed to the Kansas state Board of Education in 1985 and was re-elected in 1986. In 1988, she was appointed to the position of vice-president. Frahm was a member of the Kansas State Senate from 1989 to 1995. She became the first woman to be given the title of majority leader of the Kansas Senate when she was elected in 1993. Frahm was the 44th Lieutenant Governor of Kansas from 1995 to 1996. While serving as lieutenant governor, Frahm also served as the state's Secretary of Administration.

On May 16, 1996, Senate Majority Leader Bob Dole, announced that he would resign from the Senate to focus all of his time on his presidential campaign, stating that he would formally leave by June 11. Eight days later, Governor Bill Graves announced that he would appoint Frahm to replace Dole. On June 11, Dole resigned and Frahm was sworn in. During her time in the Senate, Frahm voted with the Republican Party 92.9% of the time. The Senate average was 87.5%. Around the time she was sworn in as Senator, she labeled herself as "traditionally conservative...very tight-fisted, very prudent. That's what Kansas is."

Frahm ran in the Republican special primary on August 6 to serve Dole's remaining two years of his term, where she immediately ran into competition in first-term U.S. Representative Sam Brownback (who had asked Graves to appoint him but was rejected). He campaigned in favor of banning legal abortion and a constitutional amendment allowing school prayer, each of which Frahm opposed. Frahm received just 41% of the vote; Brownback went on to win the November 1996 special general election, taking office two days after winning. Frahm was the first appointed senator to lose a party primary since Maryon Pittman Allen in 1978 and the last until Luther Strange did so in 2017.

== Other ==
Frahm is an Honorary Chair of Women for Kansas. She moved back to Colby, Kansas, and became the executive director of the Kansas Association of Community College Trustees. For the 2018 gubernatorial election, Frahm joined many other high-profile Republican current and former legislators and politicians in endorsing the Democratic nominee, and eventual victor, Laura Kelly. Frahm endorsed Kelly again in her successful 2022 reelection bid.

== See also ==
- List of female lieutenant governors in the United States
- Women in the United States Senate

Party political offices
Preceded by Harland Priddle	Republican nominee for Lieutenant Governor of Kansas; 1994	Succeeded by Gary Sherrer
Political offices
Preceded by Jim Francisco	Lieutenant Governor of Kansas; 1995–1996	Succeeded by Gary Sherrer
U.S. Senate
Preceded by Bob Dole	United States Senator (Class 3) from Kansas; 1996; Served alongside: Nancy Kassebaum	Succeeded by Sam Brownback
U.S. order of precedence (ceremonial)
Preceded by Dean Barkley as Former U.S. Senator	Order of precedence of the United States	Succeeded by Carte Goodwin as Former U.S. Senator
