= Melany Barnes =

American politician

Member of the Kansas House of Representatives from the 95th district
- In office October 14, 2009 – January 10, 2011
- Preceded by: Tom Sawyer
- Succeeded by: Benny Boman
- In office January 11, 1999 – January 13, 2003
- Preceded by: Tom Sawyer
- Succeeded by: Tom Sawyer

Personal details
- Born: September 1, 1956 (age 70)
- Party: Democratic

Melany Barnes (September 1, 1956) is an American former politician who was a Democratic member of the Kansas House of Representatives, representing the 95th district. She replaced Tom Sawyer in the Fall of 2009 and served until 2011 when she lost her re-election bid to Republican Benny Boman.
