= Pennsylvania Liquor Control Board =

Independent government agency in Pennsylvania, US

Agency overview
- Jurisdiction: Pennsylvania
- Headquarters: Harrisburg, Pennsylvania, U.S.
- Agency executive: Darrell L. Clarke, Chairman
- Website: Pennsylvania Liquor Control Board

The Pennsylvania Liquor Control Board (PLCB) is the independent state government agency in Pennsylvania that manages the beverage alcohol industry in the state under the regulations of the Pennsylvania Liquor Code. The board is responsible for licensing the possession, sale, storage, transportation, importation, and manufacture of wine, spirits, malt or brewed beverages, and operating the state's system of liquor distribution, including retail sales, and providing education about harmful effects associated with underage and dangerous drinking.

The agency is headquartered is in the Northwest Office Building in Harrisburg, the state capital.

== History ==
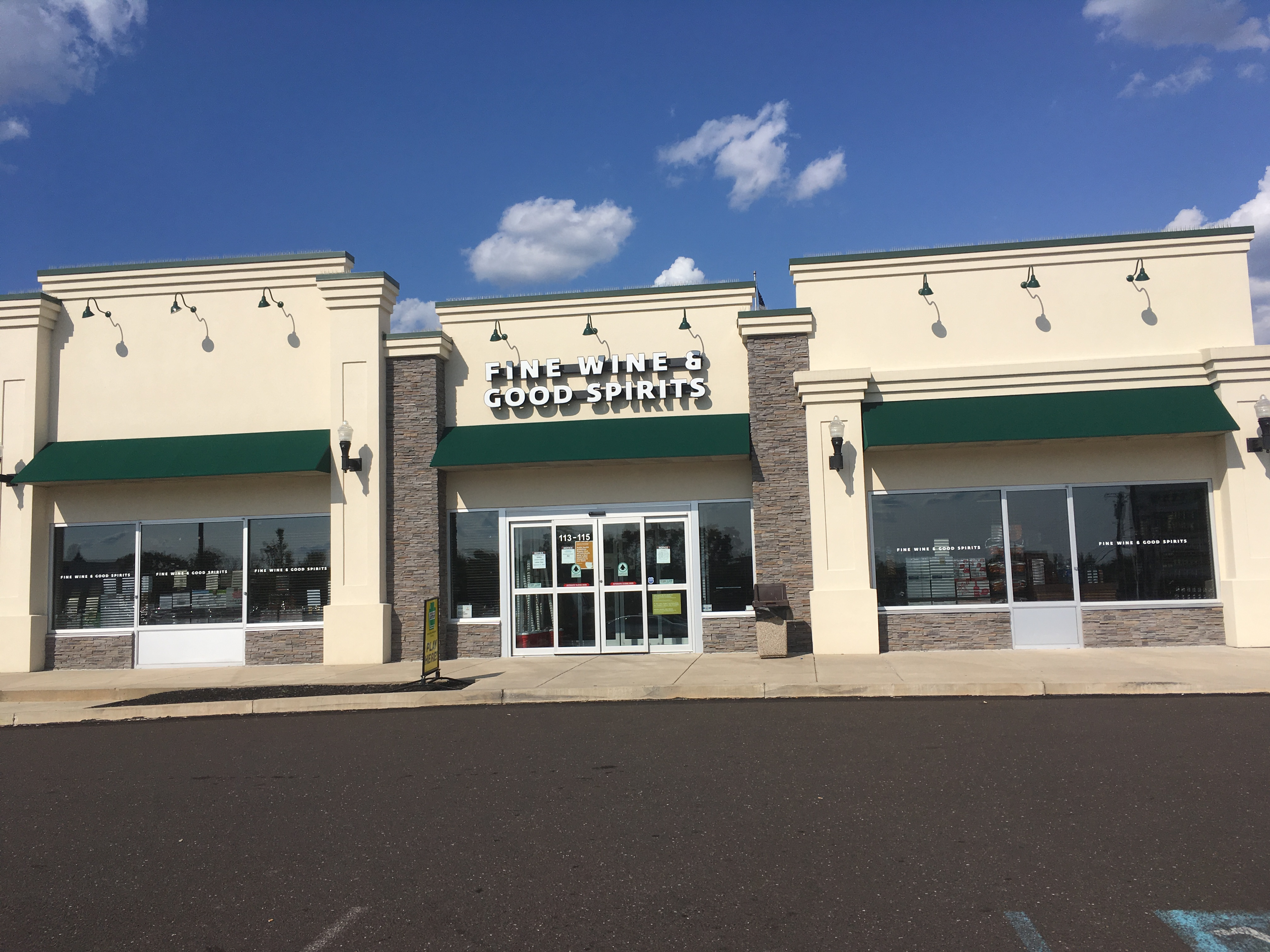
Fine Wine & Good Spirits store in Horsham, Pennsylvania

The Pennsylvania Liquor Control Board was established in conjunction with the 21st Amendment and the repeal of prohibition. In 1933, just four days before the sale of alcohol became legal in Pennsylvania, the board was officially organized. Then Pennsylvania governor Gifford Pinchot is sometimes inaccurately quoted as having said that the purpose of the board was to "discourage the purchase of alcoholic beverages by making it as inconvenient and expensive as possible," when he believed that state control was the best way to manage the state's obligations under federal prohibition.

On-premises retail licenses and off-premises wholesale licenses are apportioned through a quota system established by the Pennsylvania Liquor Code. Under the law, the PLCB may grant one retail license for every 3,000 inhabitants of a county and one wholesale license for every 30,000 inhabitants of a county with a minimum of five wholesale licenses allowed per county. To prevent a municipality from being inundated by liquor licenses, the Pennsylvania Liquor Code also established a population-based municipal quota that limits the number of retail liquor licenses allowed in a municipality; the issuance or transfer of any additional licenses beyond that quota requires prior municipal approval.

As of November 2016, there were about 20,000 active liquor licenses in Pennsylvania. Restaurants and food operations that are licensed to serve or sell drinks in Pennsylvania must purchase their liquor from the PLCB, which operates more than 600 Fine Wine & Good Spirits stores (originally branded simply as a "State Store," then "PA Wine & Spirits" stores before a rebranding project started in 2010) statewide and an e-commerce site. If a wine or spirit is not on the list of registered brands, then it cannot be bought or sold in Pennsylvania.

In 2015–16, sales at Fine Wine & Good Spirits stores generated more than $2.43 billion in sales and taxes. Taxes and store profits are returned to Pennsylvania’s General Fund; more than $626.3 million was returned to the Pennsylvania Treasury, funded state programs or was returned to local communities in FY2015-16.

In the five fiscal years since fiscal year between 2011–12 and 2015–16, PLCB provided more than $2.66 billion to the Pennsylvania Treasury, $122.5 million to the Pennsylvania State Police, $12.1 million to the Department of Drug and Alcohol Programs, and $22.5 million to local communities. Since its inception, the PLCB has contributed more than $15.1 billion to the Pennsylvania Treasury.

The Board also supervises local option referendums in counties and municipalities that wish to prohibit or permit establishments to sell or serve alcohol. According to Section 472 of the Pennsylvania Liquor Code, a local option referendum to change what alcohol sales a municipality allows or prohibits may be voted on during any election.

The issue may not be voted on more than once in four years. A referendum can be broad, allowing all forms of alcohol sales in a municipality, for instance, or it can be very narrow, such as allowing only a specific golf course to sell alcohol. To place a referendum on the ballot requires a petition with a number of signatures equal to at least 25 percent of the highest vote cast for any office in that municipality in the preceding general election. As of August 2017, almost 700 municipalities in Pennsylvania are "dry" or "partially dry."

Unlike other Pennsylvania administrative agencies, appeals from decisions of the board are assigned to the local Pennsylvania Court of Common Pleas, rather than directly to the Commonwealth Court of Pennsylvania.

As a result of Act 14, which was enacted on June 30, 1987, enforcement of the Pennsylvania Liquor Code was transferred from the PLCB to the Pennsylvania State Police. This function is fully funded by the PLCB out of operational revenues.

== Programs to deter underage drinking ==
The PLCB Bureau of Alcohol Education provides educational material to youth, legal consumers and beverage alcohol servers. This includes RAMP (Responsible Alcohol Management Program), which is directed at establishments selling alcoholic beverages.

PLCB policy of "zero tolerance" for sales to minors and intoxicated individuals has resulted in store employees challenging, or "carding," those who appear to be underage. Store employees can also require a customer to fill out a form attesting to his/her age before the sale is completed. This policy and effective implementation are considered to be an excellent deterrent to underage drinking in Pennsylvania. According to the PLCB Fiscal Year 2014–15 Annual Report, Fine Wine & Good Spirits store employees conducted more than 1.3 million ID checks in 2014.

The Bureau of Alcohol Education annually awards approximately $1 million in grants to reduce underage and dangerous drinking to colleges and universities, community organizations, law enforcement departments, and high schools. Those same groups send representatives to an annual Alcohol Education conference for prevention professionals in Pennsylvania. Another annual event is the Alcohol Awareness Poster Contest for students in kindergarten through 12th grade.

== Quotas ==
The quota on retail liquor licenses is set forth in Section 461(a) of the Pennsylvania Liquor Code. While that section lays out exceptions, generally, Restaurant Liquor (R), Eating Place Malt Beverage (E), Club (C) and Catering Club Liquor (CC) licenses are subject to the quota. Quota exceptions include ski resorts and casinos. Hotel (H), Off-Track Wagering Restaurant Liquor (OWR), Airport Restaurant (AR), Golf Course (PGR, PGC, GCC, PGE), Continuing Care Retirement (CRR, CRE), Economic Development (EDR, EDE), Performing Arts (PAF) and Public Venue Restaurant (PV) licenses are not subject to the quota.

The first retail license quota was established by Act 358 of 1939, which set it at 1 license for every 1,000 municipal inhabitants. That was changed to 1 license for every 1,500 inhabitants by Act 702 of 1951; 1 license for every 2,000 inhabitants by Act 108 of 1972; and 1 license for every 3,000 inhabitants by Act 160 of 1990. The quota system was switched to a county-based system by Act 141 of 2000.

Section 437(f) of the Pennsylvania Liquor Code establishes quotas for Malt Beverage Distributors (D) and Malt Beverage Importing Distributors (ID). One D or ID license is issued for every 30,000 residents, with a minimum of five available in each county. There are no exceptions. Act 591 of 1952 established the distributor license quota at 1 license for every 10,000 county inhabitants and a minimum of five per county. Act 445 of 1965 changed the quota to 1 license for every 15,000 county inhabitants; Act 160 of 1990 made it 1 license for every 30,000 county inhabitants.

== Board members and their terms of service ==
Dates	Chairman	Member	Member
Nov. 29, 1933, to March 6, 1934	Robert. S. Gawthrop (R)	A. Marshall Thompson (D)	Vacant
March 7, 1934, to July 7, 1935	Robert. S. Gawthrop (R)	A. Marshall Thompson (D)	W. Worrell Wagner (R)
July 7, 1935, to Dec. 31, 1936	Walter T. Grosscup (D)	W. Worrell Wagner (R)	Leo A. Crossen (D)
Jan. 2, 1937, to Jan. 22, 1939	Leo A. Crossen (D)	W. Worrell Wagner (R)	J. Twing Brooks (D)
Jan. 23, 1939, to April 23, 1939	Vacant	W. Worrell Wagner (R)	J. Twing Brooks (D)
April 24, 1939, to Sept. 15, 1939	Walter Harrison Hitchler (R)	W. Worrell Wagner (R)	J. Twing Brooks (D)
Sept. 16, 1939, to May 31, 1940	Walter Harrison Hitchler (R)	W. Worrell Wagner (R)	Vacant
June 1, 1940, to Dec. 11, 1940	William S. Rial (R)	W. Worrell Wagner (R)	Vacant
Dec. 12, 1940, to July 19, 1941	William S. Rial (R)	W. Worrell Wagner (R)	Frederick T. Gelder (R)
July 20, 1941, to May 12, 1943	Frederick T. Gelder (R)	W. Worrell Wagner (R)	Vacant
May 13, 1943, to Feb. 4, 1947	Frederick T. Gelder (R)	W. Searight Stuart (R)	Vacant
Feb. 5, 1947, to Feb. 11, 1947	Frederick T. Gelder (R)	Vacant	Vacant
Feb. 12, 1947, to Jan. 21, 1948	Frederick T. Gelder (R)	Charles C. McGovern (R)	Vacant
Jan. 22, 1948, to April 30, 1949	Frederick T. Gelder (R)	Charles C. McGovern (R)	Frank D. Armstrong (R)
May 1, 1949, to May 31, 1949	Frederick T. Gelder (R)	Frank D. Armstrong (R)	Vacant
June 1, 1949, to Sept. 3, 1953	Frederick T. Gelder (R)	Frank D. Armstrong (R)	David R. Perry (R)
Sept. 4, 1953, to Feb. 7, 1955	Frederick T. Gelder (R)	David R. Perry (R)	Vacant
Feb. 8, 1955, to Dec. 31, 1955	Patrick E. Kerwin (D)	Donald A. Behney (R)	John S. Rice (D)
Jan. 2, 1956, to Jan. 25, 1956	Patrick E. Kerwin (D)	Donald A. Behney (R)	Vacant
Jan. 26, 1956, to Dec. 1, 1957	Patrick E. Kerwin (D)	Donald A. Behney (R)	Abraham D. Cohn (D)
Dec. 2, 1957, to Sept. 5, 1961	Patrick E. Kerwin (D)	Abraham D. Cohn (D)	Daniel B. Swaney (D)
Sept. 6, 1961, to Jan. 12, 1964	Abraham D. Cohn (D)	Daniel B. Swaney (D)	Dean R. Fisher (D)
Jan. 13, 1964, to May 8, 1966	Abraham D. Cohn (D)	Dean R. Fisher (D)	James E. Staudinger (R)
May 9, 1966, to Nov. 21, 1966	Abraham D. Cohn (D)	Dean R. Fisher (D)	Vacant
Nov. 22, 1966, to Dec. 19, 1966	Abraham D. Cohn (D)	Dean R. Fisher (D)	Edwin Winner (R)
Dec. 20, 1966, to May 31, 1967	Abraham D. Cohn (D)	Edwin Winner (R)	William Z. Scott (R)
June 1, 1967, to Jan. 2, 1968	William Z. Scott (R)	Abraham D. Cohn (D)	Edwin Winner (R)
Jan. 2, 1968, to Jan. 3, 1972	William Z. Scott (R)	Edwin Winner (R)	George R. Bortz (R)
Jan. 4, 1972, to Jan. 28, 1972	Edwin Winner (R)	George R. Bortz (R)	Daniel W. Pennick (D)
Jan. 28, 1972, to Dec. 1, 1972	Edwin Winner (R)	Daniel W. Pennick (D)	Vacant
Dec. 1, 1972, to Dec. 4, 1972	Edwin Winner (R)	Daniel W. Pennick (D)	Gene Roscioli (D)
Dec. 4, 1972, to Nov. 30, 1974	Gene Roscioli (D)	Edwin Winner (R)	Daniel W. Pennick (D)
Nov. 30, 1974, Jan. 6, 1975	Vacant	Edwin Winner (R)	Vacant
Jan. 6, 1975, to Sept. 28, 1976	Henry H. Kaplan (D)	Edwin Winner (R)	Daniel W. Pennick (D)
Sept. 29, 1976, to March 1, 1979	Henry H. Kaplan (D)	Daniel W. Pennick (D)	Ralph O. Barnett (D)
March 2, 1979, to May 18, 1980	Daniel W. Pennick (D)	Ralph O. Barnett (D)	Vacant
May 19, 1980, to Dec. 8, 1987	Daniel W. Pennick (D)	Ralph O. Barnett (D)	Mario Mele (R)
Act 14 of 1987
Dec. 9, 1987, to May 19, 1992	James A. Goodman (D)	Robert P. Fohl (R)	Oliver L. Slinker (D)
May 20, 1992, to July 5, 1992	James A. Goodman (D)	Robert P. Fohl (R)	Vacant
July 6, 1992, to May 16, 1995	James A. Goodman (D)	Robert P. Fohl (R)	Oliver L. Slinker (D)
May 17, 1995, to May 22, 1995	Vacant	Robert P. Fohl (R)	Oliver L. Slinker (D)
May 23, 1995, to May 21, 1996	John E. Jones III (R)	Robert P. Fohl (R)	Oliver L. Slinker (D)
May 22, 1996, to June 16, 1997	John E. Jones III (R)	Robert P. Fohl (R)	Vacant
June 17, 1997, to May 19, 1998	John E. Jones III (R)	Robert P. Fohl (R)	P.J. Stapleton (D)
May 20, 1998, to June 8, 1998	John E. Jones III (R)	P.J. Stapleton (D)	Vacant
June 9, 1998, to Sept. 24, 1999	John E. Jones III (R)	Robert P. Fohl (R)	P.J. Stapleton (D)
Sept. 25, 1999, to Oct. 25, 1999	John E. Jones III (R)	P.J. Stapleton (D)	Vacant
Oct. 26, 1999, to Aug. 2, 2002	John E. Jones III (R)	P.J. Stapleton (D)	Jonathan H. Newman (R)
Aug. 3, 2002, to April 28, 2003	Jonathan H. Newman (R)	P.J. Stapleton (D)	Vacant
April 29, 2003, to Jan. 11, 2007	Jonathan H. Newman (R)	P.J. Stapleton (D)	Thomas F. Goldsmith (R)
Jan. 12, 2007, to Nov. 19, 2007	P.J. Stapleton (D)	Thomas F. Goldsmith (R)	Vacant
Nov. 20, 2007, to Oct. 31, 2011	P.J. Stapleton (D)	Thomas F. Goldsmith (R)	Robert S. Marcus (R)
Nov. 1, 2011, to Oct. 6, 2012	Joseph E. "Skip" Brion (R)	P.J. Stapleton (D)	Robert S. Marcus (R)
Oct. 7, 2012, to Nov. 13, 2013	Joseph E. "Skip" Brion (R)	Robert S. Marcus (R)	Vacant
Nov. 14, 2013, to Oct. 21, 2014	Joseph E. "Skip" Brion (R)	Robert S. Marcus (R)	Tim Holden (D)
Oct. 21, 2014, to Feb. 16, 2015	Joseph E. "Skip" Brion (R)	Tim Holden (D)	Mike Negra (R)
Feb. 16, 2015, to Nov. 19, 2015	Tim Holden (D)	Joseph E. "Skip" Brion (R)	Mike Negra (R)
Nov. 20, 2015, to April 20, 2016	Tim Holden (D)	Mike Negra (R)	Vacant
April 20, 2016, to Jan. 6, 2019	Tim Holden (D)	Mike Negra (R)	Michael Newsome (D)
Jan. 7, 2019, to June 19, 2019	Tim Holden (D)	Mike Negra (R)	Vacant
June 20, 2019, to Present	Tim Holden (D)	Mike Negra (R)	Mary Isenhour (D)

== Privatization support ==
For over forty years, starting with the administration of Governor Milton Shapp, efforts have existed to abolish the Board and privatize liquor sales in Pennsylvania. Critics of the Board argue that the commonwealth would generate significant income by selling state liquor stores to private entities while continuing to reap millions in annual sales taxes from alcohol sales and liquor tax revenues. Further, it has been cited that customers could benefit from lower prices, longer hours and wider selection at privately run liquor stores.

In addition, privatizing liquor sales would allow the commonwealth to recoup taxes from sales in neighboring states such as New Jersey, Ohio and Delaware. Despite these arguments, efforts to privatize have largely stalled. According to former governor Dick Thornburgh, "the principal roadblock to reform has traditionally been an odd coalition of state store employee unions, fundamentalist anti-alcohol groups and organizations such as Mothers Against Drunk Driving, all of which perceive that they have legitimate interests which are not susceptible to statewide budgetary considerations. It would take some courageous leadership to stare down this combination, something I do not see in the commonwealth today."

In September 2014, the Pennsylvania House of Representatives proposed a bill that would decriminalize purchasing wine and liquor in other states and transporting it to the state.

Opponents of privatization argued that keeping the stores public would generate significantly more money over time, as well as keep over 5,000 employees from losing their jobs, pensions, and health benefits, many of whom are elderly. LCB employees are commonwealth employees, with the same benefits as other agencies, but a smaller proportion would be eligible for state-worker-style benefits than among other PA government workers: In 2014-2015, 44% of the total 4,250 employees at LCB stores was seasonal or part-time.

On July 2, 2015, Governor Tom Wolf vetoed the first-ever privatization bill to reach the governor's desk.

On August 8, 2016, Wolf signed into law a bill that allowed for some privatization but kept wine distribution under state control.

A subsequent campaign to further privatize by State Rep. Natalie Mihalek (R-Allegheny) in 2022 was opposed by LCB employees and also their union, the United Food and Commercial Workers.

== See also ==
- List of Pennsylvania state agencies
