= 1994 Kansas gubernatorial election =

- November 8, 1994
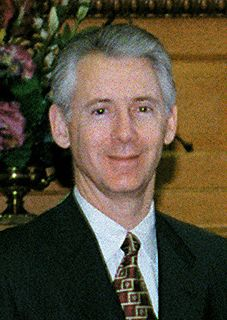

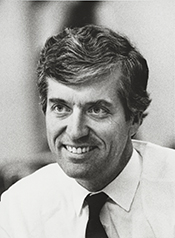
| Nominee | Bill Graves | Jim Slattery |
| Party | Republican | Democratic |
| Running mate | Sheila Frahm | Carol Sader |
| Popular vote | 526,113 | 333,589 |
| Percentage | 64.09% | 35.91% |
- County results Graves: 50–60% 60–70% 70–80% 80–90% Slattery: 50–60%
Governor before election
Joan Finney
Democratic
Elected Governor
Bill Graves
Republican

The 1994 Kansas gubernatorial election was held on November 8, 1994. Republican Bill Graves, the incumbent Secretary of State of Kansas, won the open seat vacated by the pending retirement of incumbent Democratic Governor Joan Finney. Graves defeated Democrat Jim Slattery, the congressman from the second congressional district. Slattery himself defeated incumbent Lieutenant Governor Jim Francisco and state representative Joan Wagnon in the Democratic primary.

== Republican primary ==
=== Candidates ===
- Bill Graves, Secretary of State of Kansas

== Democratic primary ==
=== Candidates ===
- Jim Francisco, incumbent Lieutenant Governor
- Jim Slattery, U.S. Representative from Kansas's 2nd congressional district
- Joan Wagnon, State Representative from Topeka
- Fred Phelps, minister and disbarred lawyer

== Results ==
Kansas gubernatorial election, 1994
| Party | Candidate | Votes | % | ±% |
|---|---|---|---|---|
| Republican | Bill Graves | 526,113 | 64.09% | +21.50% |
| Democratic | Jim Slattery | 294,733 | 35.91% | −12.68% |
| Total votes | | 820,846 | 100.00% | N/A |
| Republican gain from Democratic | | | | |
