= Kenneth Francisco =

American politician

Member of the Kansas Senate from the 26th district
- In office January 14, 1991 – 1992
- Preceded by: Jim Francisco
- Succeeded by: Todd Tiahrt

Member of the Kansas House of Representatives from the 90th district
- In office 1975–1978

Member of the Kansas House of Representatives from the 90th district
- In office 1981–1990

Personal details
- Born: November 16, 1941 Lamar, Colorado, U.S.
- Died: March 7, 2013 Newton, Kansas
- Party: Democratic
- Spouse: Everell D. Baldwin
- Relations: Jim Francisco (brother)

Kenneth D. Francisco (November 16, 1941–March 7, 2013) was an American politician who served in both chamber of the Kansas State Legislature.

Francisco was born in Lamar, Colorado on 16 November 1941. His older brother was Jim Francisco, also a future Kansas state legislator. Kenneth Francisco served in the United States Army before starting a 26-year career in public office. He served in the Kansas House of Representatives from 1975 to 1978, then 1981 to 1990, before his appointment to the Kansas Senate to succeed his brother between 1991 and 1992. Kenneth Francisco later served on the Kansas Racing Commission. Francisco died on 7 March 2013, aged 71.
