= Mike Hayden =

41st Governor of Kansas from 1987 to 1991

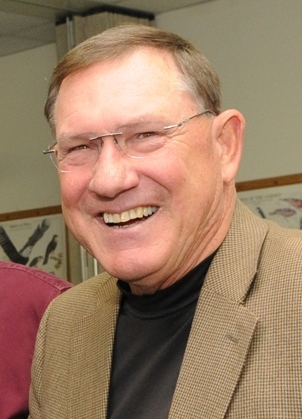
- Hayden in 2010

41st Governor of Kansas
- In office January 12, 1987 – January 14, 1991
- Lieutenant: Jack D. Walker
- Preceded by: John W. Carlin
- Succeeded by: Joan Finney

Speaker of the Kansas House of Representatives
- In office January 10, 1983 – January 12, 1987
- Preceded by: Wendell Lady
- Succeeded by: James Braden

Member of the Kansas House of Representatives from the 120th district
- In office January 8, 1973 – January 12, 1987
- Preceded by: Oscar Spotts
- Succeeded by: Fred Gatlin

Personal details
- Born: John Michael Hayden; March 16, 1944 (age 82) Colby, Kansas, U.S.
- Party: Republican
- Spouse: Patti Rooney
- Education: Kansas State University (BS); Fort Hays State University (MS)

Military service
- Branch/service: United States Army
- Battles/wars: Vietnam War
- Awards: Soldier's Medal; Bronze Star Medal; Army Commendation Medal

John Michael Hayden (born March 16, 1944) is a retired American politician and veteran who served as the 41st governor of Kansas, from 1987 to 1991. He subsequently served as the Secretary of the Kansas Wildlife and Parks Department under Kansas governors Kathleen Sebelius and Mark Parkinson.

== Early life ==
Michael Hayden, also known as Mike Hayden, was born in Colby, Kansas, on March 16, 1944. He grew up in the small western Kansas town of Atwood, in Rawlins County. He was raised by his father Irven Wesley Hayden, and mother Ruth Kelley Hayden.

Hayden's family ties to agriculture compelled him to pursue a degree in wildlife conservation; he received his bachelor's degree from Kansas State University in 1966

After graduation, he was drafted into the U.S. Army during the Vietnam War and was deployed to Vietnam in 1969 as a second lieutenant. He returned home in May 1970, and attended Fort Hays State University where he received a master's degree in biology.

== Running for office ==
Hayden ran for a seat in the Kansas House of Representatives in 1972. The incumbent, Milton Nitsch, focused a lot of his energy on the business world. It was when Nitsch voted down each bill that focused on improving the environment that Hayden turned to his wife and exclaimed "I think I'll run [for legislature]". On learning of his intent, opponent Nitsch was bemused and impartial towards the prospect of a "young kid" competing against him for his incumbent position. Hayden was twenty-eight years old upon his entrance to the Legislative race, and to that point, there had not been a successful campaign that got a person under the age of fifty elected. Hayden claimed that the primary was hard-fought, but in the end, Hayden won by a mere 250 votes. Hayden credits a large portion of his success to the results of the previous election in 1970. During that election, incumbent Nitsch barely scraped by. Another factor that Hayden acknowledged was that the family roots stretched deeply in the realm of politics as far as 1924 with his grandfather as mayor.

== Legislative terms ==
Hayden's experience in the legislature was focused on eventually becoming the Speaker of the House. During his journey to becoming a speaker, he reluctantly accepted a position on the Ways and Means Committee. Hayden had wanted to be a part of the Natural Resources Committee but knew that it was beneficial to have a deeper understanding of how government worked.

Several history-making events occurred during this period. The Watergate Scandal occurred, which caused the only Democratic turnover in the state's history, and kept Hayden on the Ways and Means Committee. Due to this, Hayden was a high-ranking member of the Republican party. Secondly, Hayden became friends with a handful of crucial people: Wendell Lady, who soon became speaker, and Bill Bunten, who accepted the vice-chairman position of the Ways and Means Committee instead of the chairman position, so that Hayden could have the chairmanship. After four years of chairing the Ways and Means committee, Michael Hayden was the "one person left standing" for the position of speaker.

The idea of running for governor was a distant and farfetched thought early on in Hayden's career as a speaker. During his second term as speaker, Governor Carlin's term was coming to an end and the potential nominee was not up to par. Hayden served on the Legislature for the years 1972–1986.

== Running for governor ==
The Republican Party contained seven potential candidates. Hayden approached the primaries with, in his words, a "very simple strategy". The plan he devised was to win the hearts of the ninety counties that contained less than ten thousand citizens. The primary results concluded that Hayden had won eighty-nine of those counties. In the documentary The Kansas Governor, journalist Lew Ferguson claimed that "People will vote for candidate A or B more than based on political party or issues. They vote on the person they are most comfortable with, like the best, and that projects a personality that is pleasing to them". While the other candidates were competing for the urban votes, Hayden's team focused on "solidifying the rural votes".

In the general election, Hayden ran against personal friend Lieutenant Governor Thomas Docking. Docking had had no opposition when it came to the primaries. He spent no money on advertisements, made no effort to make a lot of appearances, and attempted to save his resources. Hayden won the election.

== Governor of Kansas ==
On election, Hayden recalls in The Kansas Governor, "It's an overwhelming feeling … a humbling feeling. You've got to be yourself, that's your best tools. There is no one way, everyone brings their own personality and I brought a no-nonsense one". Hayden focused on three issues during his first term as governor: The Highway Plan, Property Tax Appraisal, and his Tell the Governor sessions.

Kansas has the third-largest highway system in the US. Hayden attempted to rejuvenate the highways in 1987 by calling a special legislative session, but the idea was not supported. It was not until 1989 that Hayden was able to pass an eight billion dollar plan for the highways. The Wichita Eagle stated that "the highway plan has changed people's lives forever in southeastern Kansas."

The second major theme of Hayden's gubernatorial career was to reappraise properties in order to adjust property taxes. Hayden proposed a question as to whether or not the people of his constituency wanted to move from the uniform system to a new system of classification. The people voted yes. He put a system in place that worked annually with one third of the property population so that there would be a turnover in property taxes every three years. The reappraisal raised taxes on some of the citizens, and lowered the taxes on others. It helped the farmers and homeowners, but commercial property owners and real estate agents were enraged at how the property tax appraisal turned out. The issue heavily split the Republican party. Hayden stated "I knew it was the right thing to do, but I also knew that politically it was probably the kiss of death, and ultimately proved to be so far as the election goes."

The third issue that Michael Hayden dealt with over the years was his ability to manage the matters of the state, and the matters of the people within the state. He started a program called "Tell the Governor". Claiming that it was important to break down the barriers, Hayden went all over Kansas, telling everyone that they had five minutes with the governor. On recounting his experience with Tell the Governor, Hayden says "What I remember most about it was, first, it keeps you in touch. It keeps you in touch with reality." Hayden stated that the demand for appearances was overwhelming, and he continuously overscheduled.

== Seeking reelection ==
At the end of Hayden's term, he began to seek reelection. "I knew that reelection prospects were going to be difficult," Hayden said. The main opponent from the Republican primary was Nestor Weigand. Weigand was one of the realtors and a part of the anti-tax movement. In the end, Hayden beat Weigand and went on to compete against Democratic challenger Joan Finney. Finney was the pro-life state treasurer and took over the polls so much that Hayden could not catch up. Finney beat Hayden in the general election and took over the position of governor.

Political offices
Preceded by Wendell Lady	Speaker of the Kansas House of Representatives; 1983–1987	Succeeded by James Braden
Preceded by John W. Carlin	Governor of Kansas; 1987–1991	Succeeded by Joan Finney
Party political offices
Preceded by Sam Hardage	Republican nominee for Governor of Kansas; 1986, 1990	Succeeded by Bill Graves
Preceded by Michael Castle	Chair of the Republican Governors Association; 1988–1989	Succeeded by John Ashcroft
U.S. order of precedence (ceremonial)
Preceded by John W. Carlin as Former Governor	Order of precedence of the United States	Succeeded by Bill Graves as Former Governor
