= Tom Sawyer (Kansas politician) =

American politician (born 1958)

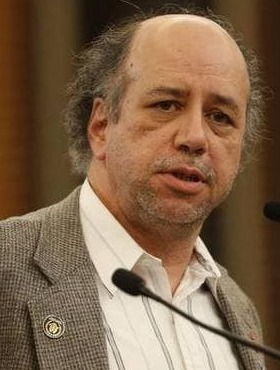

Minority Leader of the Kansas House of Representatives
- In office January 14, 2019 – January 9, 2023
- Preceded by: Jim Ward
- Succeeded by: Vic Miller

Member of the Kansas House of Representatives from the 95th district
- Incumbent
- Assumed office January 14, 2013
- Preceded by: Benny Boman
- In office January 13, 2003 – September 2009
- Preceded by: Melany Barnes
- Succeeded by: Melany Barnes
- In office January 12, 1987 – January 11, 1999
- Preceded by: Homer Jarchow
- Succeeded by: Melany Barnes

Personal details
- Born: April 15, 1958 (age 68) Wichita, Kansas, U.S.
- Party: Democratic
- Education: Wichita State University (BBA)
- Website: Campaign website

Tom Sawyer (born April 15, 1958) is an American politician who served as the minority leader of the Kansas House of Representatives. A Democrat, Sawyer has represented the 95th district, covering southwest Wichita, since 2013. He previously represented the same district from 1987 to 1999 and from 2003 to 2009, serving as both Majority Leader and Minority Leader during his first stint in the legislature.

== Kansas House career ==
Born in Wichita, Kansas, Sawyer graduated from Wichita State University with a BBA in Accounting in 1984. He was first elected to the Kansas House of Representatives two years later in 1986. He became the party's House leader, and through his initial 12-year legislative career served as both the majority leader and the minority leader. He is only the fourth Democrat to ever be elected majority leader of the Kansas House, and the only Wichitan to hold that position in the last 30 years.

After leaving the legislature for an unsuccessful run for governor of Kansas in 1998, Sawyer served as state chairman of the Kansas Democratic Party for four years before being again elected to the state legislature in 2002. He was re-elected in 2004, 2006 and 2008, and served as chair of the Sedgwick County Legislative Delegation in 2005. He resigned from the House of Representatives in 2009 to serve on the state Parole Board.

Following the election of Republican Governor Sam Brownback in 2010, Sawyer left the Parole Board. In 2012 he again won election to the state House, defeating a Republican incumbent and returning to his position as the representative for the 95th district.

== 1998 gubernatorial campaign ==
In 1998, Sawyer opted to run for governor of Kansas to prevent controversial Westboro Baptist Church preacher Fred Phelps from obtaining the Democratic nomination. Though he won the primary in a landslide, Sawyer was defeated badly in the general election, losing all 105 counties and winning just 23% of the vote against popular incumbent Republican governor Bill Graves.

Party political offices
Preceded by Jim Slattery	Democratic nominee for Governor of Kansas; 1998	Succeeded by Kathleen Sebelius
Kansas House of Representatives
Preceded by Jim Ward	Minority Leader of the Kansas House of Representatives; 2019–2023	Succeeded by Vic Miller
