= Jack D. Walker =

American politician and physician

42nd Lieutenant Governor of Kansas
- In office January 12, 1987 – January 14, 1991
- Governor: Mike Hayden
- Preceded by: Thomas Docking
- Succeeded by: Jim Francisco

Member of the Kansas Senate from the 8th district
- In office January 14, 1985 – January 12, 1987
- Preceded by: Jan Meyers
- Succeeded by: Dick Bond

Personal details
- Born: April 5, 1922 Girard, Kansas, U.S.
- Died: September 1, 2005 (aged 83) Overland Park, Kansas, U.S.
- Party: Republican
- Education: Pittsburg State University; University of Kansas

Jack D. Walker (April 5, 1922 – September 1, 2005) was an American politician and physician. He served as the 42nd Lieutenant Governor of Kansas from 1987 to 1991. Walker had previously served as a member of the Kansas Senate from the 8th district and mayor of Overland Park, Kansas.

He is an alumnus of Pittsburg State University and the University of Kansas.

Party political offices
Preceded by Dan Thiessen	Republican nominee for Lieutenant Governor of Kansas; 1986	Succeeded by Harland Priddle
Political offices
Preceded by Thomas Docking	Lieutenant Governor of Kansas; 1987–1991	Succeeded by James L. Francisco
