= Skip Brion =

American politician and attorney

Joseph E. "Skip" Brion
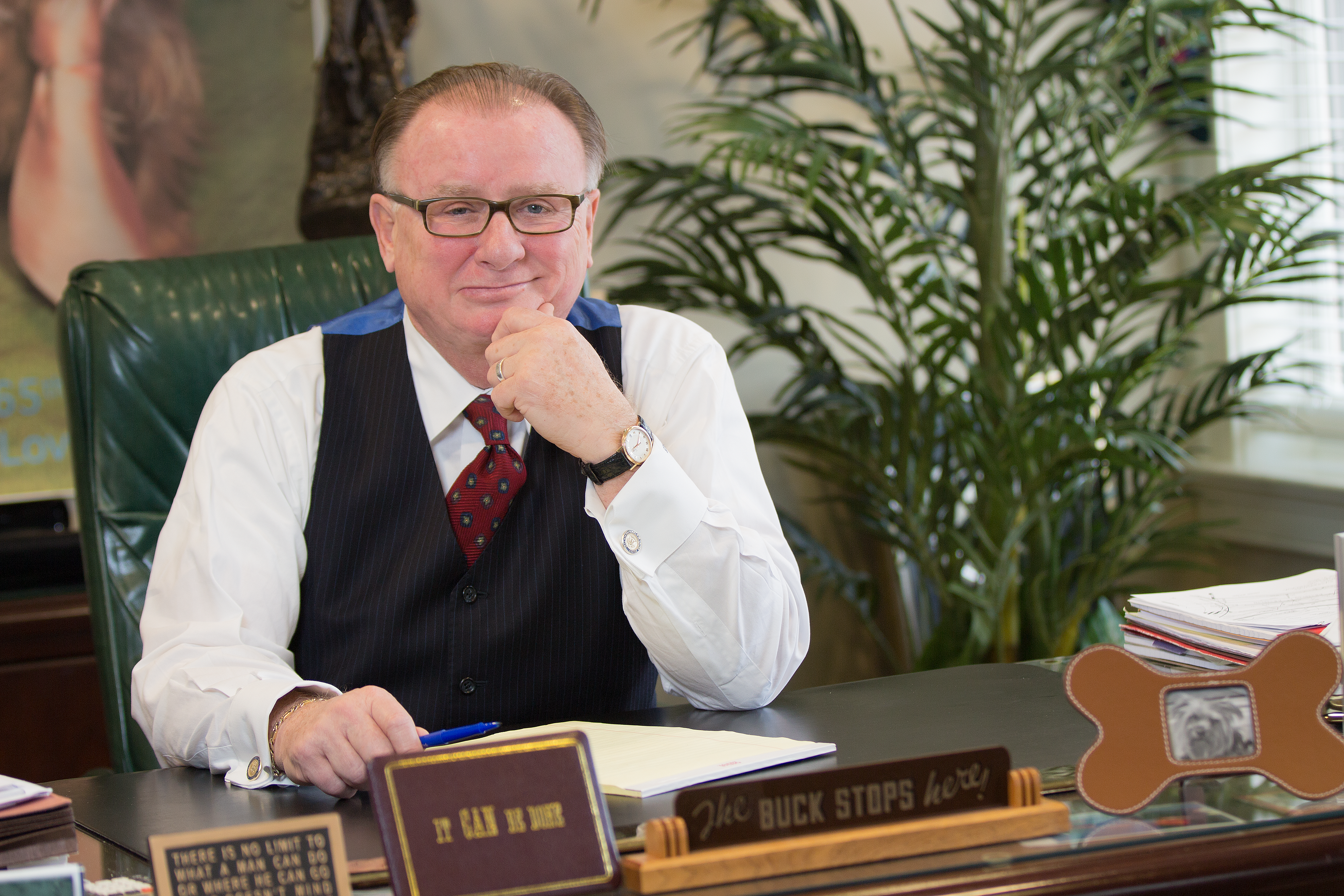
- Skip Brion in his office in West Chester, PA

Member of the Pennsylvania Liquor Control Board
- In office November 1, 2011 – November 19, 2015
- Appointed by: Tom Corbett
- Preceded by: Thomas Goldsmith
- Succeeded by: Michael Newsome

Chairman of the Republican Committee of Chester County
- In office June 9, 1996 – September 23, 2011
- Preceded by: Alan Novak
- Succeeded by: Val DiGiorgio

Personal details
- Born: September 20, 1948 (age 77)
- Party: Republican
- Spouse: Glenda
- Children: 2
- Education: St. Joseph's University; Villanova Law School
- Occupation: Attorney, Politician

Joseph E. "Skip" Brion is an American politician and attorney from the state of Pennsylvania. He is a member of the Republican Party.

Brion is a former chairman of the Chester County Republican Committee, a position he held for 15 years. He resigned from the post in 2011 when Governor Tom Corbett appointed him to fill a vacancy on the Pennsylvania Liquor Control Board. He was chairman of the PLCB from his 2011 appointment through February 2015; he remained a PLCB member until Nov. 19, 2015. He is currently a partner at the West Chester law firm of Buckley, Brion, McGuire, Morris and Sommer.
