= 1998 Kansas gubernatorial election =

- November 3, 1998
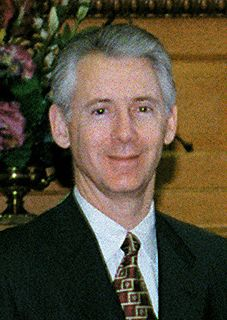

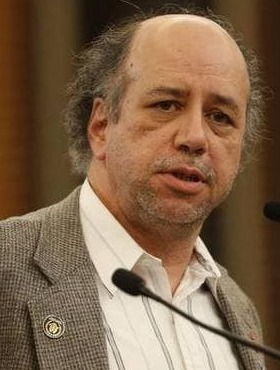
| Nominee | Bill Graves | Tom Sawyer |
| Party | Republican | Democratic |
| Running mate | Gary Sherrer | Elizabeth Baker |
| Popular vote | 544,882 | 168,243 |
| Percentage | 73.37% | 22.65% |
- County results Graves: 50–60% 60–70% 70–80% 80–90%
Governor before election
Bill Graves
Republican
Elected Governor
Bill Graves
Republican

The 1998 Kansas gubernatorial election took place on November 3, 1998 to elect the governor and lieutenant governor of Kansas. Republican incumbent Bill Graves was re-elected to a second term in office over Democratic state representative Tom Sawyer in a landslide. Graves was the first Republican to win re-election as governor since John Anderson Jr. in 1962.

== Republican primary ==
=== Candidates ===
- Bill Graves, incumbent governor of Kansas since 1995
- David Miller, former chair of the Kansas Republican Party

=== Results ===
Republican primary results
| Party | Candidate | Votes | % |
|---|---|---|---|
| Republican | Bill Graves (incumbent) | 225,782 | 72.80 |
| Republican | David Miller | 84,368 | 27.20 |
| Total votes | | 310,150 | 100.00 |

== Democratic primary ==
=== Candidates ===
- Tom Sawyer, state representative from Wichita
- Fred Phelps, founder of the Westboro Baptist Church

=== Results ===
Democratic primary results
| Party | Candidate | Votes | % |
|---|---|---|---|
| Democratic | Tom Sawyer | 88,248 | 85.28 |
| Democratic | Fred Phelps | 15,233 | 14.72 |
| Total votes | | 103,481 | 100.00 |

== General election ==
=== Candidates ===
- Bill Graves, incumbent governor of Kansas since 1995 (Republican)
  - Running mate: Gary Sherrer, incumbent lieutenant governor of Kansas since 1996
- Darrel King (Reform)
- Kirt Poovey (Constitution)
- Tom Sawyer, state representative from Wichita (Democratic)
  - Running mate: Elizabeth Baker

=== Polling ===
| Poll source | Date(s) | Sample size (Note: Key: A – all adults RV – registered voters LV – likely voters V – unclear) | Margin of error | Bill Graves (R) | Tom Sawyer (D) | Other / undecided (Note: Calculated by taking the difference of 100% and all other candidates combined.) |
|---|---|---|---|---|---|---|
| SurveyUSA | October 28, 1998 | 500 | — | 74% | 21% | 5% |
| Mason-Dixon Polling & Strategy | July 6–8, 1998 | 804 (LV) | ± 3.5% | 67% | 16% | 17% |

=== Results ===
Kansas gubernatorial election, 1998
| Party | Candidate | Votes | % | ±% |
|---|---|---|---|---|
| Republican | Bill Graves (incumbent) | 544,882 | 73.37% | +9.27% |
| Democratic | Tom Sawyer | 168,243 | 22.65% | −13.25% |
| Constitution | Kirt Poovey | 21,710 | 2.92% | |
| Reform | Darrel King | 7,830 | 1.05% | |
| Majority | | 376,639 | 50.71% | +22.53% |
| Turnout | | 742,665 | | |
| Republican hold | | Swing | | |
