= Thomas Docking =

American politician

41st Lieutenant Governor of Kansas
- In office January 10, 1983 – January 12, 1987
- Governor: John W. Carlin
- Preceded by: Paul Dugan
- Succeeded by: Jack D. Walker

Personal details
- Born: Thomas Robert Docking; August 10, 1954 Lawrence, Kansas, U.S.
- Died: August 24, 2017 (aged 63) Wichita, Kansas, U.S.
- Party: Democratic
- Spouse: Jill Docking
- Education: University of Kansas
- Occupation: lawyer

Thomas Robert Docking (August 10, 1954 – August 24, 2017) was an American politician. He was the 41st Lieutenant Governor of Kansas from 1983 to 1987. A lawyer, he was an alumnus of the University of Kansas.

His father, Robert Docking, and grandfather, George Docking, both served as Governor of Kansas. Docking died from cancer on August 24, 2017.

Political offices
Preceded by Paul Dugan	Lieutenant Governor of Kansas; 1983–1987	Succeeded by Jack D. Walker
Party political offices
Preceded by Paul Dugan	Democratic nominee for Lieutenant Governor of Kansas; 1982	Succeeded by John G. Montgomery
Preceded by John W. Carlin	Democratic nominee for Governor of Kansas; 1986	Succeeded by Joan Finney
