= Secretary of State of Kansas =

Constitutional officer of the U.S. state of Kansas

Secretary of state of Kansas
- Seal of the secretary of state of Kansas

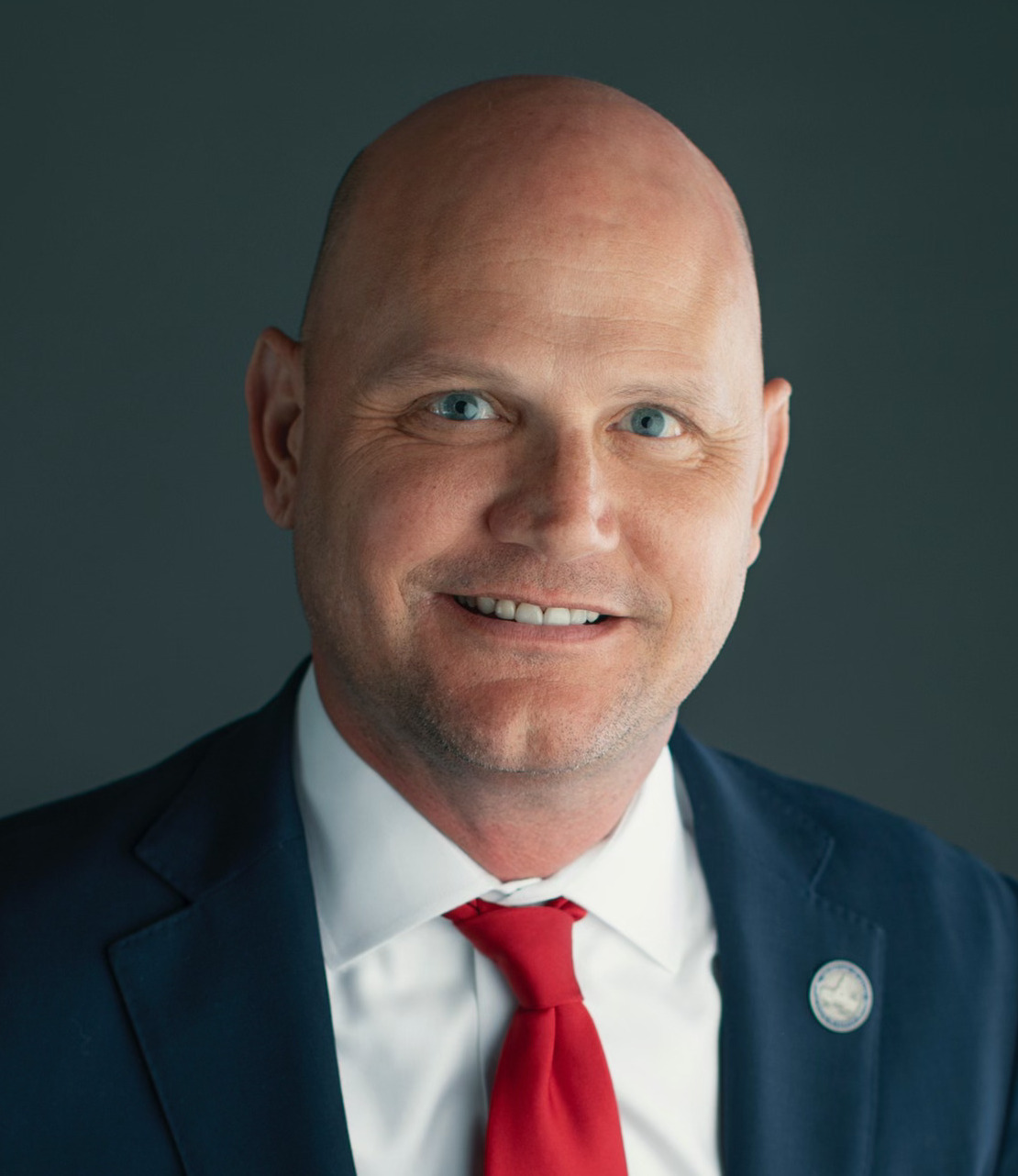
- Incumbent; Scott Schwab since January 14, 2019
- Inaugural holder: John Winter Robinson
- Formation: February 1861
- Succession: Fourth
- Website: sos.kansas.gov

The secretary of state of Kansas is one of the constitutional officers of the U.S. state of Kansas. The incumbent secretary of state is the former speaker pro tempore of the Kansas House of Representatives, Scott Schwab, who was sworn in on January 14, 2019.

== History ==
The first secretary of state for Kansas was John Winter Robinson, a physician originally from Litchfield, Maine, but who had settled in Manhattan, Kansas, in 1857. Robinson was elected in December 1859, in anticipation of statehood for Kansas, and sworn in after Kansas was admitted to the Union in February 1861.

As a result of a bond scandal, Robinson was impeached on February 26, 1862, along with the governor, Charles L. Robinson, and state auditor, George S. Hillyer. Robinson was convicted by the Kansas Senate on June 12, 1862, and removed from his office, becoming the first state executive branch official to be impeached and removed from office in U.S. history. Hillyer was also removed from office, on June 16, but Governor Robinson was acquitted. Sanders R. Shepard succeeded to the job of secretary of state on July 28, 1862.

In 2015, Secretary Kris Kobach requested and was granted by the Kansas Legislature prosecutorial power in voter fraud cases. In October that year, he filed his first three vote fraud cases, dealing with voting in two states.

== Duties ==
=== Electoral ===
The secretary of state is the chief elections officer of the state, administering elections and voter registration throughout the state. The office also receives campaign finance reports and registers lobbyists. The duty of regulating lobbying and campaign finance is shared with the Kansas Governmental Ethics Commission. The secretary was granted by the Kansas Legislature prosecutorial power in voter fraud cases and is the first and only secretary of state to hold that power.

=== Economic ===
The secretary operates the Business Filing Center, which registers business entities, trademarks, trade names and liens made pursuant to the Uniform Commercial Code.

The secretary regulates a wide variety of businesses, including sports agents, trade unions, cemeteries and funeral homes.

=== Administrative ===
The Secretary's Publications Section is responsible for publishing various legal and informational documents for the state including statutory and administrative law publications such as session laws, regulations and the state's gazette, the Kansas Register.

== Officeholders ==
=== Territorial ===
| Name | Term | Party |
|---|---|---|
| Daniel Woodson | 1854–1857 | Democratic |
| Frederick P. Stanton | 1857 | Democratic |
| James W. Denver | 1857–1858 | Democratic |
| Hugh Sleight Walsh | 1858–1860 | Democratic |
| George M. Beebe | 1860–1861 | Democratic |

=== State ===
| Image | Name | Term | Party |
|---|---|---|---|
| | John Winter Robinson | 1861–1862 | Republican |
| | Sanders Rufus Shepherd | 1862–1863 | Republican |
| | Warren Wirt Henry Lawrence | 1863–1865 | Republican |
| | Rinaldo Allen Barker | 1865–1869 | Republican |
| | Thomas Moonlight | 1869–1871 | Republican |
| | William Hillary Smallwood | 1871–1875 | Republican |
| | Thomas Horne Cavanaugh | 1875–1879 | Republican |
| | James Smith | 1879–1885 | Republican |
| | Edwin Bird Allen | 1885–1889 | Republican |
| | William Higgins | 1889–1893 | Republican |
| | Russell Scott Osborn | 1893–1895 | Populist |
| | William Corydon Edwards | 1895–1897 | Republican |
| | William Eben Bush | 1897–1899 | Populist |
| | George Alfred Clark | 1899–1903 | Republican |
| | Joel Randall Burrow | 1903–1907 | Republican |
| | Charles Eugene Denton | 1907–1911 | Republican |
| | Charles Harrison Sessions | 1911–1915 | Republican |
| | John Thomas Botkin | 1915–1919 | Republican |
| | Lewis Julian Pettijohn | 1919–1922 | Republican |
| | David Owen McCray | 1922–1923 | Republican |
| | Frank Joseph Ryan | 1923–1929 | Republican |
| | Edgbert Albert Cornell | 1929–1933 | Republican |
| | Frank Joseph Ryan | 1933–1949 | Republican |
| | Larry Ryan | 1949–1951 | Democratic |
| | Paul R. Shanahan | 1951–1966 | Republican |
| | Elwill Shanahan | 1966–1978 | Republican |
| | Jack Brier | 1978–1987 | Republican |
| | Bill Graves | 1987–1995 | Republican |
| | Ron Thornburgh | 1995–2010 | Republican |
| | Chris Biggs | 2010–2011 | Democratic |
| | Kris Kobach | 2011–2019 | Republican |
| | Scott Schwab | 2019–present | Republican |

== See also ==
- List of company registers
