= Bill Graves =

American politician (born 1953)

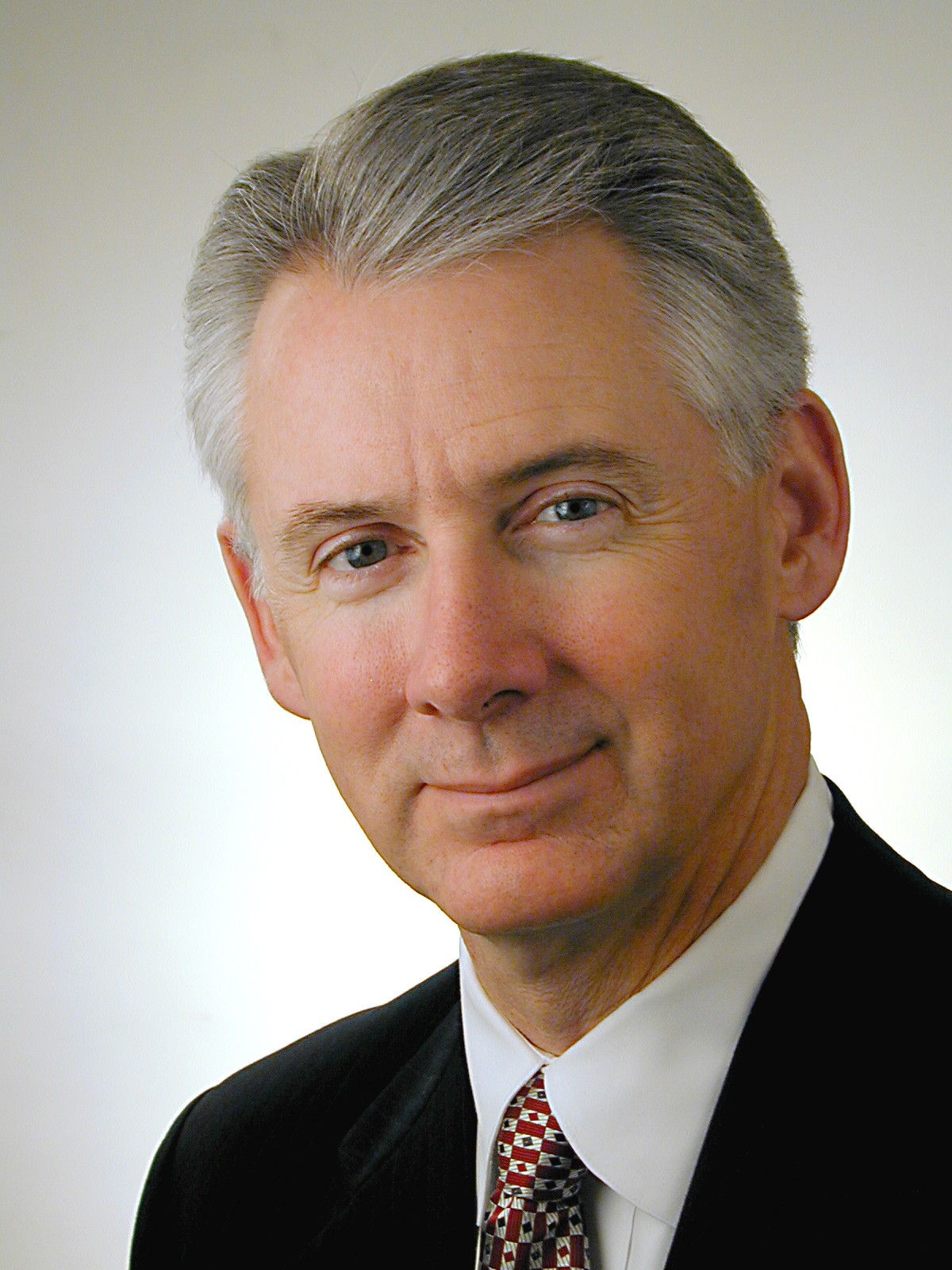

43rd Governor of Kansas
- In office January 9, 1995 – January 13, 2003
- Lieutenant: Sheila Frahm; Gary Sherrer
- Preceded by: Joan Finney
- Succeeded by: Kathleen Sebelius

28th Secretary of State of Kansas
- In office January 12, 1987 – January 9, 1995
- Governor: Mike Hayden; Joan Finney
- Preceded by: Jack Brier
- Succeeded by: Ron Thornburgh

Personal details
- Born: William Preston Graves; January 9, 1953 (age 73) Salina, Kansas, U.S.
- Party: Republican
- Spouse: Linda Richey (m. 1990)
- Children: 1
- Education: Kansas Wesleyan University (BA)

William Preston Graves (born January 9, 1953) is an American former politician who was the 43rd governor of Kansas from 1995 until 2003. He is a member of the Republican Party.

== Early life ==
Graves was born in Salina, Kansas on January 9, 1953. His parents owned a trucking firm. After graduating from Kansas Wesleyan University with a business degree, he worked in human resources.

== Career ==
In 1986, he was elected Kansas Secretary of State and in 1991, he was appointed as a representative of state governments to the Competitiveness Policy Council.

He defeated Democratic Congressman Jim Slattery in the Republican sweeping elections of 1994 at the age of 41. In 1997 Graves was the Chairman of the Midwestern Governors Association.

He won re-election in 1998 with the largest percentage of votes in Kansas gubernatorial history. Graves was ineligible to run for a third term as governor by Kansas state law, and was succeeded by Democrat Kathleen Sebelius in January 2003. Serving with him as lieutenant governor were Sheila Frahm (1995–1996), whom he appointed to fill Bob Dole's seat in the Senate, and Gary Sherrer (1996–2003).

=== Post-gubernatorial tenure ===
Following his tenure as governor, he became president of the American Trucking Associations.

In the 2018 race for governor, Graves endorsed Democratic candidate and eventual winner Laura Kelly over Republican Kris Kobach. Four years later, Graves again endorsed Kelly as she won re-election over Republican Derek Schmidt. In the 2026 U.S. Senate election, Graves endorsed Democratic nominee Adam Hamilton over incumbent Republican Senator Roger Marshall.

== Personal life ==
Bill Graves married Linda Richey in 1990, and they have one daughter.

== Electoral history ==
1994 Kansas gubernatorial election
Party	Candidate	Votes	%
Republican	Bill Graves	526,113	64.09
Democratic	Jim Slattery	294,733	35.91
Total votes		820,846	100.00
Republican gain from Democratic			

1998 Kansas gubernatorial election
Party	Candidate	Votes	%	±%
Republican	Bill Graves (incumbent)	544,882	73.37%	+9.27%
Democratic	Tom Sawyer	168,243	22.65%	−13.25%
Constitution	Kirt Poovey	21,710	2.92%	
Reform	Darrel King	7,830	1.05%	
Majority		376,639	50.71%	+22.53%
Turnout		742,665		
Republican hold		Swing		

Party political offices
Preceded by Jack Brier	Republican nominee for Secretary of State of Kansas; 1986, 1990	Succeeded by Ron Thornburgh
Preceded by Mike Hayden	Republican nominee for Governor of Kansas; 1994, 1998	Succeeded by Tim Shallenburger
Political offices
Preceded by Jack Brier	Secretary of State of Kansas; 1987–1995	Succeeded by Ron Thornburgh
Preceded by Joan Finney	Governor of Kansas; 1995–2003	Succeeded by Kathleen Sebelius
U.S. order of precedence (ceremonial)
Preceded by Mike Hayden as Former Governor	Order of precedence of the United States	Succeeded by Mark Parkinson as Former Governor
