= Jim Francisco =

American politician

43rd Lieutenant Governor of Kansas
- In office January 14, 1991 – January 9, 1995
- Governor: Joan Finney
- Preceded by: Jack D. Walker
- Succeeded by: Sheila Frahm

Member of the Kansas Senate from the 26th district
- In office January 8, 1973 – January 14, 1991
- Preceded by: Harold S. Herd
- Succeeded by: Kenneth D. Francisco

Member of the Kansas House of Representatives from the 69th district
- In office January 9, 1967 – January 8, 1973
- Preceded by: Loyd Andrews
- Succeeded by: Ben Sellers

Personal details
- Born: James Lee Francisco; October 10, 1937 Lamar, Colorado, U.S.
- Died: September 1, 2018 (aged 80) Derby, Kansas, U.S.
- Party: Democratic
- Spouse: Sharon Lynn Maddux
- Relations: Kenneth Francisco (brother)
- Education: Wichita State University

James Lee Francisco (October 10, 1937 – September 1, 2018) was an American politician. He served as the 43rd Lieutenant Governor of Kansas from 1991 to 1995. He graduated from Wichita State University and was an employee relations counselor. Francisco lived in Moundridge, Kansas. He also served in the Kansas House of Representatives from 1967 to 1973 and served in the Kansas Senate from 1973 to 1991.

Party political offices
Preceded by John G. Montgomery	Democratic nominee for Lieutenant Governor of Kansas; 1990	Succeeded by Carol H. Sader
Political offices
Preceded by Jack D. Walker	Lieutenant Governor of Kansas; 1991–1995	Succeeded by Sheila Frahm
