= John W. Carlin =

American politician (born 1940)

John Carlin
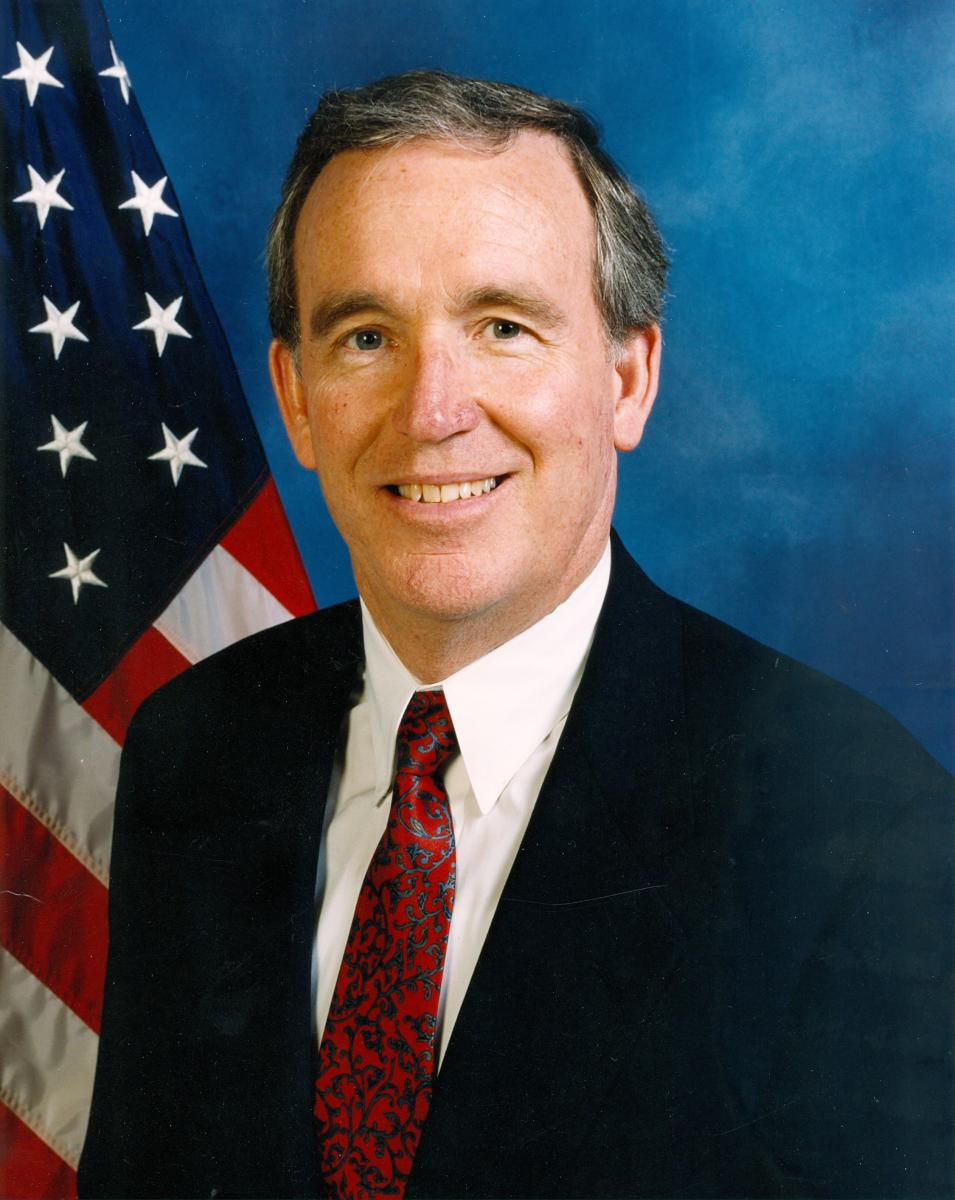

8th Archivist of the United States
- In office May 30, 1995 – February 15, 2005
- President: Bill Clinton; George W. Bush
- Preceded by: Don W. Wilson
- Succeeded by: Allen Weinstein

40th Governor of Kansas
- In office January 8, 1979 – January 12, 1987
- Lieutenant: Paul Dugan; Thomas Docking
- Preceded by: Robert Bennett
- Succeeded by: Mike Hayden

Chair of the National Governors Association
- In office July 31, 1984 – August 6, 1985
- Preceded by: James R. Thompson
- Succeeded by: Lamar Alexander

Member of the Kansas House of Representatives from the 73rd district
- In office January 11, 1971 – January 7, 1979

Personal details
- Born: John William Carlin; August 3, 1940 (age 86) Salina, Kansas, U.S.
- Party: Democratic
- Spouse(s): Ramona Hawkinson; Karen Bigsby Hurley; Diana Prentice; Lynn Lady
- Education: Kansas State University (BS)
- Website: Official website

John William Carlin (born August 3, 1940) is an American educator and politician who served as the 40th governor of Kansas from 1979 to 1987, and the archivist of the United States from May 30, 1995, to February 15, 2005. He is a member of the Democratic Party. Carlin teaches at Kansas State University as a visiting professor and previously operated a website to advance civic engagement.

== Early life ==
Carlin was born in Salina, Kansas. He was raised in the Saline County, Kansas community of Smolan. Carlin attended Kansas State University and earned a degree in dairy science in 1962. He was a member of FarmHouse fraternity.

== Career ==
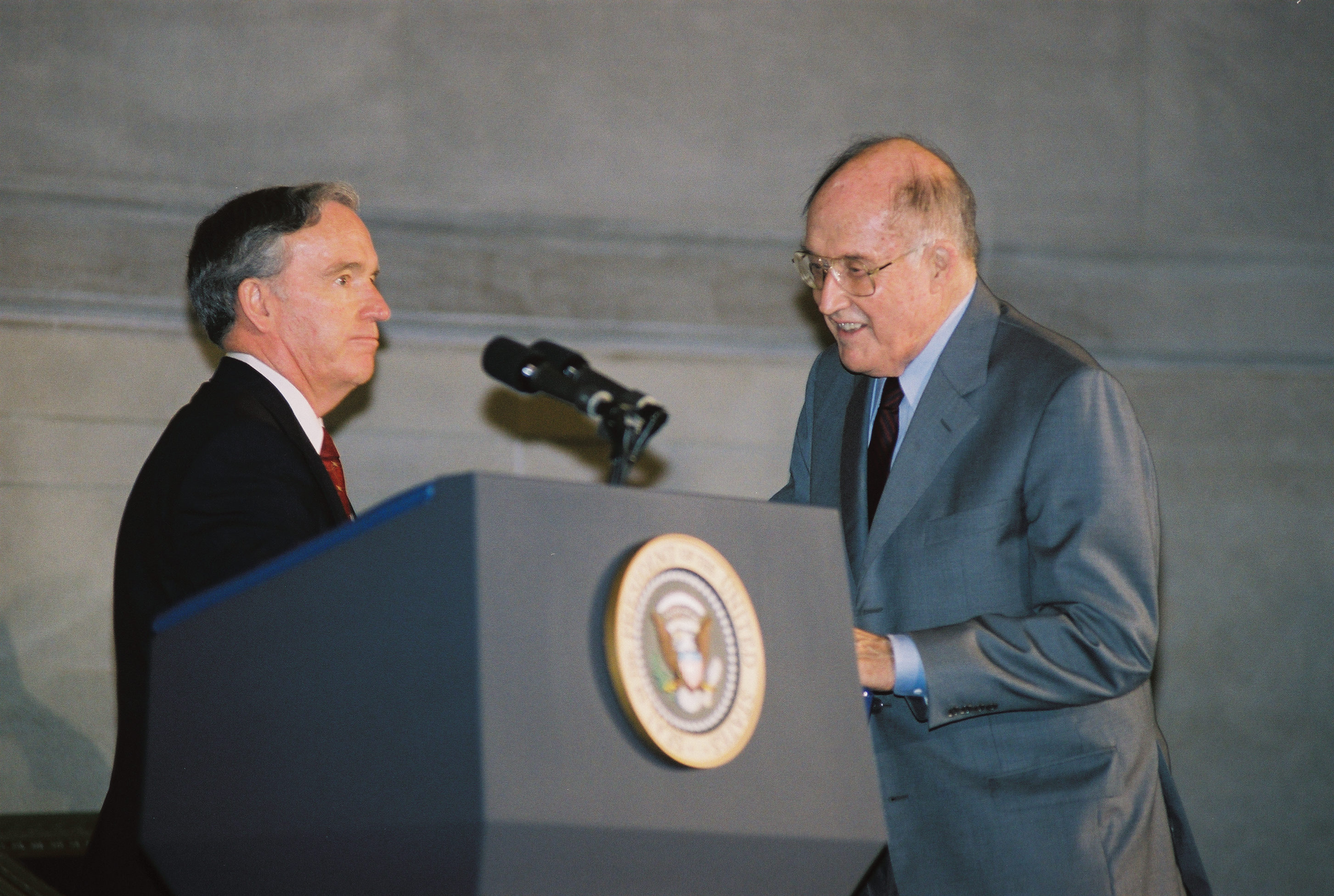
Carlin and William Rehnquist at the rededication of the National Archives Rotunda, 2003

A dairy farmer, Carlin ran for a seat in the Kansas House of Representatives in 1970. He served as Speaker of the Kansas House from 1977 to 1979. In 1979 he became the youngest 20th century governor of Kansas, defeating incumbent Robert Frederick Bennett. In 1984, he ruled out a challenge to Senator Bob Dole in 1986, citing the difficult challenge, and wanting to lessen partisanship in the final years of his term. In 1990, he lost the Democratic nomination for governor to then-State Treasurer Joan Finney. He also ran unsuccessfully for the U.S. House of Representatives in 1994, when he was defeated by Sam Brownback, whom Carlin had appointed Secretary of Agriculture of Kansas in 1986.

Carlin chaired the National Governors Association from 1984 to 1985 and the Midwestern Governors Conference.

Appointed by President Bill Clinton, Carlin served as the Archivist of the United States from 1995 to 2005, in Washington, D.C. After a dispute about Executive Order 13233, Carlin's term as archivist was not renewed by the Bush administration. He served as chair of the National Historical Publications and Records Commission while serving as archivist.

After his retirement, Carlin returned to Manhattan, Kansas, where he serves as a visiting professor, executive-in-residence, in the political science department at Kansas State University and in the university's School of Leadership Studies. He has visited Duke University, the University of Kansas, Wichita State University, and Washburn University as visiting professor.

Carlin served as a member of the Kansas Bioscience Authority from July 2006 to August 2012.

In January 2015, Carlin launched a website to explore ideas, stimulate creative thinking, and advance civic engagement. Along with an active social media presence, the site shares his experience and perspective through a blog on current issues, compelling photo and biographical content, and a series of short video clips that can be used as a resource in classrooms, organizations, and for personal learning on the topic of leadership.

Carlin is also a member of the ReFormers Caucus of Issue One.

== See also ==
- Executive Order 13233

Party political offices
Preceded by Vern Miller	Democratic nominee for Governor of Kansas; 1978, 1982	Succeeded by Thomas Docking
Political offices
Preceded by Robert Bennett	Governor of Kansas; 1979–1987	Succeeded by Mike Hayden
Preceded by James R. Thompson	Chair of the National Governors Association; 1984–1985	Succeeded by Lamar Alexander
Government offices
Preceded by Don W. Wilson	Archivist of the United States; 1995–2005	Succeeded by Allen Weinstein
U.S. order of precedence (ceremonial)
Preceded by Martha McSally as Former US Senator	Order of precedence of the United States; Within Kansas	Succeeded by Mike Hayden as Former Governor
Preceded by Kate Brown as Former Governor	Order of precedence of the United States; Outside Kansas	Succeeded by Mike Hayden as Former Governor
