= 2026 United States Senate election in Kansas =

- November 3, 2026

Nominee	Adam Hamilton	Roger Marshall
Party	Democratic	Republican
Popular vote	571,573	511,360
Percentage	51.18%	45.79%
- Hamilton: 40–50% 50–60% 60–70% 70–80% Marshall: 40–50% 50–60% 60–70% 70–80% 80–90%
U.S. senator before election
Roger Marshall
Republican
Elected U.S. senator
Adam Hamilton
Democratic

The 2026 United States Senate election in Kansas was held on November 3, 2026, to elect a member of the United States Senate to represent the state of Kansas. Democratic pastor Adam Hamilton defeated Republican incumbent Roger Marshall.

Primary elections were held on August 4. Seeking a second term, Marshall won the Republican nomination against minimal opposition with 79.9% of the vote. Hamilton, the senior pastor and founder of the United Methodist Church of the Resurrection, won the Democratic nomination with 34.6% of the vote among a field of eight candidates.

Though initially expected to be an uncompetitive hold for Republicans, by September polls instead showed a much more competitive race between Hamilton and Marshall. Polling in the final weeks of the campaign showed Hamilton with a consistent lead. Hamilton's victory made him the first Democrat to win a Senate race in Kansas since 1932.

This was one of eight seats Democrats flipped in a state carried by Donald Trump in the 2024 presidential election.

== Background ==
Though generally considered to be a red state, Kansas had shown greater competitiveness over time due to shifts in the traditionally Republican-leaning Kansas City suburbs. While Republicans control both houses of the Kansas Legislature, Democrats control the governorship of Kansas, which they flipped from Republican control in 2018, and held in 2022.

Kansas last elected a Democrat to the U.S. Senate in 1932, and was continuously represented by Republicans for 88 years, the longest streak of continuous single-party representation in the Senate since the passage of the Seventeenth Amendment. Incumbent senator Roger Marshall was elected in 2020 with 53.2% of the vote, winning by 11.4% despite expectations of a close race.

ICE raids in Kansas were a major issue in the election, which drove voters against Republicans.

== Republican primary ==
=== Candidates ===
==== Nominee ====
- Roger Marshall, incumbent U.S. senator (2021–present)

==== Eliminated in primary ====
- Arch Naramore, businessman and candidate for U.S. Senate in 2004 (endorsed Hamilton in general election)

=== Endorsements ===
Roger Marshall

Executive branch officials

- Donald Trump, president of the United States (2017–2021, 2025–present)

Organizations

- AIPAC
- Senate Conservatives Fund

=== Fundraising ===
Campaign finance reports as of March 31, 2026
Candidate	Raised	Spent	Cash on hand
Roger Marshall (R)	$5,528,510	$957,210	$4,781,258
Source: Federal Election Commission

=== Results ===
Primary results by county: Marshall: 60–70%; 70–80%; 80–90%; >90%

Republican primary results
Party	Candidate	Votes	%
Republican	Roger Marshall (incumbent)	270,632	79.9
Republican	Arch Naramore	68,100	20.1
Total votes		338,732	100.0

== Democratic primary ==
=== Candidates ===
==== Nominee ====
- Adam Hamilton, pastor and founder of the Church of the Resurrection (initially formed exploratory committee as an independent)

==== Eliminated in primary ====
- Damon Anderson, business owner
- Christy Davis, former Kansas director for USDA Rural Development and candidate for Kansas's 1st congressional district in 2020
- Jason Hart, former federal prosecutor
- Kevin Latz, pediatric orthopedic surgeon
- Erik Murray, commercial real estate developer
- Anne Parelkar, attorney
- Patrick Schmidt, state senator from the 19th district (2025–present) and nominee for Kansas's 2nd congressional district in 2022
- Mike Soetaert, art gallery owner and perennial candidate
- Sandy Spidel Neumann, former financial services executive
- Noah Taylor, counterintelligence specialist

==== Declined ====
- Cindy Holscher, state senator from the 8th district (2021–present) (running for governor)
- Laura Kelly, governor of Kansas (2019–present)
- Sharice Davids, U.S. representative from Kansas's 3rd congressional district (2019–present) (running for re-election)

=== Endorsements ===
Adam Hamilton

Statewide officials

- Kathleen Sebelius, former governor of Kansas (2003–2009)

Local officials

- Quinton Lucas, mayor of Kansas City, Missouri (2019–present)

=== Fundraising ===
Campaign finance reports as of June 30, 2026
Candidate	Raised	Spent	Cash on hand
Christy Davis (D)	$80,478	$38,100	$85,910
Adam Hamilton (D)	$3,678,710	$1,081,012	$2,597,697
Jason Hart (D)	$51,127	$32,910	$18,216
Kevin Latz (D)	$37,759	$8,696	$54,385
Erik Murray (D)	$209,762	$199,781	$9,980
Lois Parelkar (D)	$32,140	$28,839	$3,301
Patrick Schmidt (D)	$244,347	$219,434	$24,912
Sandy Spidel Neumann (D)	$309,765	$234,887	$74,877
Source: Federal Election Commission

=== Polling ===
Poll source	Date(s) administered	Sample size (Note: Key: A – all adults RV – registered voters LV – likely voters V – unclear)	Margin of error	Christy Davis	Adam Hamilton	Patrick Schmidt	Noah Taylor	Other	Undecided
GBAO (D) (Note: Poll sponsored by Hamilton's campaign)	July 13–16, 2026	600 (LV)	± 4.0%	13%	30%	5%	10%	7% (Note: Erik Murray with 2%; Jason Hart, Kevin Latz, Sandy Neumann, Anne Parelkar and Mike Soetaert with 1%; Damon Anderson with 0%)	35%
Change Research (D) (Note: Poll commissioned by Civic Clarity)	June 11–15, 2026	1,022 (LV)	± 3.0%	10%	18%	7%	3%	6% (Note: Erik Murray with 2%, Sandy Neumann with 1%, Anne Parelkar with 3%)	55%

=== Results ===
Primary results by county: Hamilton: 20–30%; 30–40%; 40–50%; 50–60%; 60–70%; Davis: 20–30%; 30–40%; 40–50%; 80–90%; Taylor: 10–20%; 20–30%; 30–40%; 40–50%; 50–60%; Murray: 30–40%; Schmidt: 20–30%; Tie: 20–30%; 30–40%

Democratic primary results
Party	Candidate	Votes	%
Democratic	Adam Hamilton	77,607	34.6
Democratic	Christy Davis	31,857	14.2
Democratic	Noah Taylor	30,362	13.6
Democratic	Anne Parelkar	16,836	7.5
Democratic	Erik Murray	15,177	6.8
Democratic	Patrick Schmidt	13,403	6.0
Democratic	Sandy Spidel Neumann	12,717	5.7
Democratic	Jason Hart	12,412	5.5
Democratic	Damon Anderson	5,879	2.6
Democratic	Kevin Latz	4,110	1.8
Democratic	Michael Soetaert	3,716	1.7
Total votes		224,076	100.0

== Third-party and independent candidates ==
=== Nominee ===
- David C. Graham, attorney (Libertarian)

== General election ==
An issue raised during the campaign was Roger Marshall's history of suing over 700 of his patients for unpaid bills while he worked as an OB/GYN in Kansas. The New York Times reported that in at least 81 cases, patients were arrested at the request of Marshall's lawyers for failure to appear in court for their unpaid debts. There were 13 additional cases where an arrest warrant was requested, but the outcome is unknown. The New York Times additionally interviewed several of the patients who were sued by Marshall, most of whom said they lived paycheck-to-paycheck and did not have the money to pay the bills. Hamilton produced an advertisement featuring a woman who said she was arrested for missing a $50 payment to Marshall. The Marshall campaign sent a letter alleging the ad was "defamatory" because the woman was arrested for failing to appear in court over larger debts to him, rather than for missing one bill, and that she was subject to several other court proceedings.

The election received national attention for the use of an antisemitic slur by President Donald Trump during a Marshall campaign rally in order to deflect allegations about the issue. Former Republican representative Barbara Comstock said that "Trump once again lets loose his anti-Semitic rhetoric" in the incident. The White House did not respond to a request for comment about the President's use of "shylock". It was not the first time that Trump had used the term in the campaign trail, and he had also received criticism for its use in 2025, when he had claimed that he was unaware that the term was an antisemitic slur against Jews. A statement denouncing the incident, though not denouncing Trump by name was released by the Anti-Defamation League.

The Kansas City Star described the Marshall and Hamilton campaigns as making several exaggerated or false claims regarding Jeffrey Epstein, the Epstein files, and a case of sexual abuse at Church of the Resurrection.

=== Debates ===
2026 United States Senate election in Kansas debates
No.	Date	Host	Moderator	Link	Republican	Democratic
Key: P Participant A Absent N Not invited I Invited W Withdrawn						
Key: P Participant A Absent N Not invited I Invited W Withdrawn					Roger Marshall	Adam Hamilton
1	September 12, 2026	WIBW; Kansas Radio Networks	Michael Schwanke	YouTube	P	P
2	October 21, 2026	FOX4	John Holt	YouTube	P	P

==== September 12 ====
The first debate was informal, and held at the Kansas State Fair.

It was marked by a "raucous" and "vocal" crowd "that was far more loudly opposed to the incumbent U.S. senator."

==== October 21 ====
FOX4 hosted the October debate. Economic issues, including gas prices, inflation, tariffs, and the American affordability crisis were the leading topics of the debate. Marshall called for maintaining high taxes on imports and other tariffs, while Hamilton argued that they were a form of taxation that "functioned as an unpredictable tax on Kansans".

Foreign policy was also a central issue in the debate. Marshall supported continued operations in the Iran War, while Hamilton called for an exit as soon as it was sufficiently possible. Marshall defended Trump's agreement to get diesel from and his attempts to geopolitically reapproach Russia, while Hamilton claimed it would be "selling out our allies, the Ukrainians" in the current Russo-Ukrainian war. Marshall referred to Israel as "one of America's greatest allies".

Marshall expressed support for a "light touch" on AI regulation and said that America must achieve superintelligence in the arms race before China. Hamilton argued that progress in artificial intelligence poses a "potential existential threat to the human race" and that "we can't just go with a light touch and hope everybody does their very best".

=== Predictions ===
Source	Ranking	As of
ABC News	Tossup	November 3, 2026
CBS News	Lean R	October 30, 2026
The Cook Political Report	Tossup	November 2, 2026
Decision Desk HQ	Tossup	November 3, 2026
The Economist (Note: The Economist's prediction model uses unconventional terminology. For the purpose of equivalency, their "Very Likely" ratings are formatted as a "Likely" rating while "Likely" ratings are formatted as a "Lean" rating.)	Tossup	November 3, 2026
FiftyPlusOne	Lean D (flip)	November 3, 2026
Fox News	Tossup	November 1, 2026
Inside Elections	Tossup	October 29, 2026
MS NOW	Lean R	October 29, 2026
NBC News	Tossup	November 3, 2026
RealClearPolitics	Tossup	November 2, 2026
Sabato's Crystal Ball	Lean D (flip)	November 2, 2026
Silver Bulletin	Lean D (flip)	November 3, 2026
Split Ticket	Lean D (flip)	November 2, 2026

=== Post-primary endorsements ===
Roger Marshall (R)

Executive branch officials

- JD Vance, vice president of the United States (2025–present)

Statewide officials

- Sam Brownback, former governor of Kansas (2011–2018)

Individuals

- Sean O'Brien, general president of the International Brotherhood of Teamsters

Labor unions

- Brotherhood of Locomotive Engineers and Trainmen
- SMART (co-endorsement with Hamilton)
- International Brotherhood of Teamsters

Organizations

- Conservative Political Action Conference
- Kansas Family Voice
- Kansas Farm Bureau
- NRA Political Victory Fund
Adam Hamilton (D)

U.S. senators

- Sheila Frahm, former Kansas (1996) (Republican)
- Tim Kaine, Virginia (2013–present)

Statewide officials

- John W. Carlin, former governor of Kansas (1979–1987)
- Bill Graves, former governor of Kansas (1995–2003) (Republican)
- Mike Hayden, former governor of Kansas (1987–1991) (Republican)
- Laura Kelly, governor of Kansas (2019–present)
- Mark Parkinson, former governor of Kansas (2009–2011)
- Sandy Praeger, former Kansas Insurance Commissioner (2003–2015) (Republican)

State legislators

- Ed Berger, former SD-34 (2017–2021) (Republican)
- Don Hineman, former majority leader in the Kansas House of Representatives (2017–2019), former AD-118 (2009–2021) (Republican)
- David Kerr, former president of the Kansas Senate (2001–2004), former SD-34 (1985–2004) (Republican)

Individuals

- Arch Naramore, primary candidate for this seat (Republican)
- Matthew Beat, YouTuber and former history teacher (Independent)

Labor unions

- American Federation of Government Employees
- Kansas AFL-CIO
- National Education Association
- SMART (co-endorsement with Marshall)
- United Auto Workers

Organizations

- CAIR Action
- J Street
- Jewish Democratic Council of America

Political parties

- Kansas Democratic Party

Newspapers

- The Kansas City Star

=== Fundraising ===
Campaign finance reports as of October 14, 2026
Candidate	Raised	Spent	Cash on hand
Roger Marshall (R)	$7,546,611	$6,946,763	$809,806
Adam Hamilton (D)	$19,175,044	$16,300,681	$2,874,364
Source: Federal Election Commission

=== Polling ===
Aggregate polls

Source of poll aggregation	Dates administered	Dates updated	Roger Marshall (R)	Adam Hamilton (D)	Other/ Undecided (Note: Calculated by taking the difference of 100% and all other candidates combined.)	Margin
270toWin	October 20 – November 1, 2026	November 3, 2026	45.2%	50.2%	4.6%	Hamilton +5.0%
Decision Desk HQ	through November 1, 2026	November 3, 2026	45.6%	49.3%	5.1%	Hamilton +3.7%
FiftyPlusOne	through November 1, 2026	November 3, 2026	45.4%	49.8%	4.8%	Hamilton +3.4%
RealClearPolitics	October 13 – November 1, 2026	November 2, 2026	46.0%	50.1%	3.9%	Hamilton +4.1%
Silver Bulletin	through November 1, 2026	November 3, 2026	45.8%	49.9%	4.3%	Hamilton +4.1%
Average			45.4%	49.9%	4.7%	Hamilton +4.5%

Poll source	Date(s) administered	Sample size	Margin of error	Roger Marshall (R)	Adam Hamilton (D)	David Graham (L)	Other	Undecided
AtlasIntel	October 28 – November 1, 2026	2,038 (LV)	± 2.0%	45%	52%	—	3% (Note: "Other" with 2%; "Would not vote" with 1%)	1%
Survey 160	October 27 – November 1, 2026	1,267 (LV)	± 3.6%	44% (Note: With voters who lean toward a given candidate)	50%	—	4%	2%
Survey 160	October 27 – November 1, 2026	1,267 (LV)	± 3.6%	43%	50%	—	4%	4%
Survey 160	October 27 – November 1, 2026	1,339 (RV)	± 3.6%	43%	50%	—	5%	2%
Survey 160	October 27 – November 1, 2026	1,339 (RV)	± 3.6%	42%	49%	—	4%	5%
New York Times/Siena University	October 27 – November 1, 2026	736 (LV)	± 4.4%	44%	49%	4%	0%	3%
YouGov	October 26–29, 2026	2,092 (LV)	± 2.8%	49%	50%	—	1%	0%
Emerson College	October 26–28, 2026	800 (LV)	± 3.5%	47%	50%	3%	—	—
Emerson College	October 26–28, 2026	800 (LV)	± 3.5%	45%	49%	3%	—	3%
The Washington Post/SSPG	October 22–26, 2026	801 (LV)	± 3.9%	43%	52%	4%	1% (Note: "Would not vote" with 1%)	—
The Washington Post/SSPG	October 22–26, 2026	801 (LV)	± 3.9%	44%	54%	—	2%	—
SSRS (Note: Poll conducted for CNN)	October 20–26, 2026	838 (LV)	± 4.5%	45%	49%	—	5% (Note: "Neither" with 4%)	0%
RedBox Research (D)	October 20–23, 2026	1,301 (LV)	± 3.2%	46%	45%	3%	3% (Note: "Someone else" with 1%; "Prefer not to answer" with 1%; "Did not vote in this race" with <1%)	4%
InsiderAdvantage (R)	October 13–14, 2026	1,200 (LV)	± 2.8%	48%	47%	3%	—	2%
InsiderAdvantage (R)	October 9–10, 2026	1,200 (LV)	± 2.8%	47%	48%	3%	—	2%
GBAO (D) (Note: Poll sponsored by Hamilton's campaign)	September 30 – October 4, 2026	600 (LV)	± 4.0%	41%	46%	7%	—	—
GBAO (D)	September 30 – October 4, 2026	600 (LV)	± 4.0%	44%	49%	—	—	—
YouGov	September 24 – October 4, 2026	2,255 (LV)	± 3.2%	45%	48%	—	2% (Note: "Someone else" with 1%; "I will not vote in this race" with 1%)	5%
New York Times/Siena University	September 22–30, 2026	605 (LV)	± 4.6%	45%	45%	5%	0%	6%
New York Times/Siena University	September 22–30, 2026	605 (LV)	± 4.6%	47%	46%	—	0%	7%
Trafalgar Group (R)	September 29 – October 1, 2026	1,095 (LV)	± 2.9%	44%	44%	2%	—	10%
Emerson College (Note: Poll sponsored by Nexstar Media Group)	September 15–16, 2026	750 (LV)	± 3.6%	43%	45%	4%	—	8%
Global Strategy Group (D) (Note: Poll sponsored by the Democratic Attorneys General Association)	September 13–16, 2026	800 (LV)	± 3.5%	47%	49%	—	—	—
Global Strategy Group (D)	September 13–16, 2026	800 (LV)	± 3.5%	43%	47%	5%	—	—
co/efficient (R)	September 8–10, 2026	915 (LV)	± 3.22%	49%	44%	2%	—	5%
Global Strategy Group (D) (Note: Poll sponsored by People over Politics Action)	August 12–16, 2026	800 (LV)	± 3.5%	43%	44%	5%	—	8%
Public Policy Polling (D) (Note: Poll sponsored by Senate Majority PAC, which is focused on electing Democrats to the U.S. Senate)	August 7–8, 2026	569 (LV)	—	46%	45%	—	—	—
	August 4, 2026	Primary elections						
GBAO (D)	July 8–13, 2026	600 (LV)	± 4.0%	47%	43%	—	—	10%
Tavern Research (D)	January 26–28, 2026	1,013 (LV)	± 4.0%	54%	46%	—	—	—

Hypothetical polling

Roger Marshall vs. Noah Taylor

Poll source	Date(s) administered	Sample size	Margin of error	Roger Marshall (R)	Noah Taylor (D)	Undecided
Tavern Research (D)	January 26–28, 2026	1,013 (LV)	± 4.0%	55%	45%	—

Roger Marshall vs. Patrick Schmidt

Poll source	Date(s) administered	Sample size	Margin of error	Roger Marshall (R)	Patrick Schmidt (D)	Undecided
GQR (D) (Note: Poll sponsored by Schmidt's campaign)	April 23–27, 2026	500 (LV)	± 4.38%	49%	45%	6%
Tavern Research (D)	January 26–28, 2026	1,013 (LV)	± 4.0%	55%	45%	—

Roger Marshall vs. Adam Hamilton (running as an independent)

Poll source	Date(s) administered	Sample size	Margin of error	Roger Marshall (R)	Adam Hamilton (I)	Undecided
Tavern Research (D)	January 26–28, 2026	1,013 (LV)	± 4.0%	49%	51%	—

=== Results ===
2026 United States Senate election in Kansas
Party	Candidate	Votes	%	±%
Democratic	Adam Hamilton	571,573	51.18	+9.39
Republican	Roger Marshall (incumbent)	511,360	45.79	–7.43
Libertarian	David Graham	33,848	3.03	–1.96
Total votes		1,116,781	100.0	N/A
Democratic gain from Republican				

Counties that flipped from Republican to Democratic

- Finney (largest municipality: Garden City)
- Ford (largest municipality: Dodge City)
- Geary (largest municipality: Junction City)
- Lyon (largest municipality: Emporia)
- Sedgwick (largest municipality: Wichita)
- Seward (largest municipality: Liberal)

==== By congressional district ====
Hamilton won two congressional districts, including one that elected a Republican, while Marshall won the other two.

District	Hamilton	Marshall	Representative
1st	42.99%	53.53%	Tracey Mann
2nd	49.09%	46.81%	Derek Schmidt
3rd	61.23%	36.64%	Sharice Davids
4th	47.38%	49.80%	Ron Estes

== Analysis ==
This was the first time since the election of George McGill in 1932 that a Democrat won a United States Senate election in Kansas. Until this election, Kansas previously held the longest continuous single-party winning streak of any state since the Seventeenth Amendment implemented the direct election of senators in 1913.

=== Exit poll ===
2026 United States Senate election in Kansas (CNN)
Demographic subgroup	Hamilton	Marshall	% of total vote
Ideology
Liberals	99	1	20
Moderates	71	25	38
Conservatives	9	87	42
Party
Democrats	99	1	25
Republicans	12	84	42
Independents	64	31	32
Donald Trump job approval
Approve	1	95	43
Disapprove	88	9	57
2024 presidential vote
Kamala Harris	99	0	42
Donald Trump	9	87	52
Did not vote	75	21	4
Gender
Men	48	50	49
Women	53	43	51
Income
$100,000 or more	55	43	36
$50,000-$99,999	49	48	35
Less than $50,000	49	47	30
White born-again or evangelical Christian?
Yes	19	76	30
No	65	33	70
Race by gender
White men	46	51	42
White women	51	45	44
All other voters	59	34	14
Age
18–29 years old	82	17	8
30–44 years old	56	37	18
45–64 years old	45	53	34
65 and older	47	50	40
Area type
Urban	69	29	14
Suburban	60	37	40
Rural	37	59	46
Education
College graduate	58	40	45
No college degree	45	51	55
Education by race
White college graduates	56	42	40
Whites without college	43	54	46
Non-whites	64	33	14
Education by gender and race
White women with college degrees	59	39	21
White women without college degrees	44	51	23
White men with college degrees	52	46	19
White men without college degrees	41	56	23
Voters of color	64	33	14
Educational attainment
Advanced degree	60	38	21
Bachelor's degree	57	41	25
Associate's degree	51	45	11
Some college	37	58	22
Never attended college	51	47	22

== Notes ==
Partisan clients
