= 1954 United States Senate election in Kansas =

- November 2, 1954
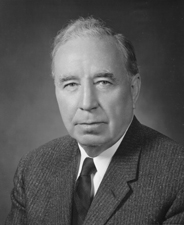

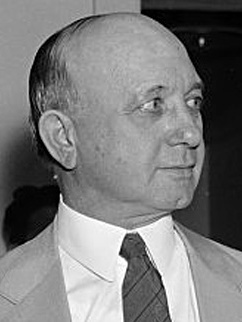
Nominee	Andrew F. Schoeppel	George McGill
Party	Republican	Democratic
Popular vote	348,144	258,575
Percentage	56.33%	41.84%
- County results Schoeppel: 40–50% 50–60% 60–70% McGill: 50–60%
U.S. senator before election
Andrew F. Schoeppel
Republican
Elected U.S. Senator
Andrew F. Schoeppel
Republican

The 1954 United States Senate election in Kansas took place on November 2, 1954. Incumbent Republican Senator Andrew F. Schoeppel ran for re-election to a second term. He was challenged by George McGill, the Democratic nominee and a former U.S. Senator, whom he had defeated in 1948. Despite a favorable national environment for Democrats, Schoeppel increased his margin of victory over McGill, defeating him with 56% of the vote.

== Democratic primary ==
=== Candidates ===
- George McGill, former U.S. Senator
- Ewell Stewart, perennial candidate

=== Results ===
Democratic primary results
Party	Candidate	Votes	%
Democratic	George McGill	66,995	74.81%
Democratic	Ewell Stewart	22,559	25.19%
Total votes		89,554	100.00%

== Republican primary ==
=== Candidates ===
- Andrew F. Schoeppel, incumbent U.S. Senator
- Walter H. Peery, retired farmer
- Abraham Joseph H. Lincoln

=== Results ===
Republican primary results
Party	Candidate	Votes	%
Republican	Andrew J. Schoeppel (inc.)	180,839	80.97%
Republican	Walter H. Peery	30,443	13.63%
Republican	Abraham Joseph H. Lincoln	12,051	5.40%
Total votes		223,333	100.00%

== Prohibition primary ==
=== Candidates ===
- David C. White, 1952 Prohibition Party nominee for Governor

=== Results ===
Prohibition primary results
Party	Candidate	Votes	%
Prohibition	David C. White	217	100.00%
Total votes		217	100.00%

== General election ==
=== Results ===
1954 United States Senate election in Kansas
Party	Candidate	Votes	%	±%
Republican	Andrew F. Schoeppel (inc.)	348,144	56.33%	+1.41%
Democratic	George McGill	258,575	41.84%	−0.88%
Prohibition	David C. White	11,344	1.84%	−0.53%
Majority		89,569	14.49%	+2.29%
Total votes		618,063	100.00%	—
Republican hold				

== See also ==
- 1954 United States Senate elections
