= Adam Hamilton (pastor) =

American politician and Methodist minister (born 1964)

The Reverend Adam Hamilton
- Hamilton in 2026

United States Senator-elect from Kansas
- Assuming office January 3, 2027
- Succeeding: Roger Marshall

Personal details
- Born: Adam Joseph Hamilton; July 12, 1964 (age 62)
- Party: Democratic (2008–2016, 2026–present)
- Other political affiliations: Independent (2020–2026); Republican (before 2008, 2016–2020)
- Spouse: LaVon Bandy (m. 1982)
- Children: 2
- Education: Oral Roberts University (BA); Southern Methodist University (MDiv)
- Website: Personal website Campaign website

Ecclesiastical career
- Religion: Christianity (Methodist)
- Church: United Methodist Church
- Ordained: c. 1986–87
- Congregations: Church of the Resurrection

Adam Joseph Hamilton (born July 12, 1964) is an American politician and Methodist minister who is a United States senator-elect from Kansas. A member of the Democratic Party, he is senior pastor of the United Methodist Church of the Resurrection, the largest United Methodist congregation in the United States, based in the Greater Kansas City area.

Hamilton grew up in Prairie Village, Kansas, and graduated with a bachelor's degree from Oral Roberts University in pastoral ministry and a Master of Divinity from the Perkins School of Theology at Southern Methodist University. He has written more than 30 books about Christian faith, biblical hermeneutics, and contemporary issues. His video-based lessons for Sunday school classes are widely used by Protestant Christians in the United States for instruction in the faith.

Hamilton was the Democratic nominee in the 2026 United States Senate election in Kansas, defeating Republican incumbent Roger Marshall. He is expected to assume office on January 3, 2027. Hamilton is the first Democrat to win a Senate race in Kansas since 1932.

== Early life and education ==
Hamilton was born on July 12, 1964 and was raised in Prairie Village, Kansas. His parents married as teenagers and divorced while he was a child. His father, Mark, was Catholic, and his mother, Glenda, was raised in the Churches of Christ. The family rarely attended church during his childhood. In high school, he started attending a Pentecostal church after a door-to-door evangelist invited him to a service. He began attending church regularly and became head of the church's youth group.

In 1982, Hamilton graduated from Blue Valley High School in Overland Park, Kansas, and married his wife, LaVon Bandy, the next week. He then attended Oral Roberts University, earning a Bachelor of Arts in pastoral ministry in 1985. His undergraduate studies and exploration of his personal faith led him to the theology of John Wesley and the United Methodist Church, and he went on to earn a Master of Divinity from the Perkins School of Theology at Southern Methodist University, where he received the B'nai B'rith Award in Social Ethics.

== Christian ministry ==
Hamilton is founding pastor of the United Methodist Church of the Resurrection in Leawood, Kansas. The church began in 1990 with a few people meeting in a small chapel at a local funeral home and grew into the largest United Methodist congregation in the United States. It has an average weekly attendance of about 25,000 across its nine locations and its online and televised services.

Hamilton has written more than 30 books. His books cover Christian faith, biblical hermeneutics, and contemporary issues. By 2014, his books and related products published by Abingdon Press had sold more than a million copies. His video-based lessons for Sunday school classes are widely used by Protestant Christians in the United States for instruction in the faith.

Hamilton preached at the National Prayer Service after the 2013 presidential inauguration. He was appointed by President Barack Obama to the President's Advisory Council on Faith-Based and Neighborhood Partnerships in 2016.

=== Theology ===
Hamilton has been influenced by Karl Barth, C. S. Lewis, E. Stanley Jones, Dietrich Bonhoeffer, Leslie Weatherhead, Harry Emerson Fosdick, Alister McGrath, Miroslav Volf, Brian McLaren, Stanley Grenz, and John Wesley. Mark Horst, reviewing Hamilton's book Confronting the Controversies in The Christian Century in 2001, wrote that Hamilton "distinguishes himself from the extremes of the theological spectrum and sets out to articulate the center of public and perhaps mainstream Protestant opinion on these matters." In 2022, Cabe Matthews wrote in Firebrand Magazine that "Hamilton claims to be a theological conservative; he doesn't want to change the doctrines contained in our Articles of Religion and our Confession of Faith. But some years ago he changed his mind on homosexuality, and his vision of the future UMC is pluralist when it comes to human sexuality."

Hamilton has said the Bible is inspired by God and that God speaks through scripture, and he defends the Thirty-nine Articles' confession that "Holy Scripture containeth all things necessary to salvation". He rejects both theological liberalism and fundamentalism. In biblical hermeneutics, he supports the Wesleyan Quadrilateral, affirming that reason, revelation, and experience take precedence over tradition. Hamilton is an adherent of the doctrine of invincible ignorance.

== 2026 U.S. Senate campaign ==
Hamilton announced his candidacy for the U.S. Senate in Kansas in April 2026. On August 4, 2026, he secured the Democratic Party nomination by winning the party's statewide primary for the Senate seat.

Hamilton describes himself as a centrist and has said, "I'm a liberal conservative and a conservative liberal, depending on the issue and the day of the week."He has described his approach to both religious and political disagreements as via media, an expression meaning to find a "middle way" between two extremes. He has previously registered as both a Republican and a Democrat and initially considered running as an independent before deciding to seek the Democratic nomination. Hamilton was encouraged to run as a Democrat to avoid splitting the vote against the Republican incumbent, Roger Marshall.His campaign focused on issues of cost of living, healthcare, and political division in federal politics.

Hamilton largely distanced himself from national Democrats during the campaign. He opposed the inclusion of transgender women in women's sports and called the border policy of Democratic former President Joe Biden a "disaster". On affordability, Hamilton opposed Trump's tariff regime and advocated tax credits for first-time homebuyers, firefighters, and teachers.

Hamilton won the general election over Marshall 51%–46%, becoming the first Democrat to be elected U.S. senator in Kansas since George McGill in 1932. His winning margin of 5% is also the best of any Democratic U.S. Senate candidate in the history of Kansas, since direct elections of senators were established by the 17th Amendment.

After Hamilton was elected, the United Methodist Church of the Resurrection said he would continue serving as senior minister at his church on a quarter-time basis concurrently with his U.S. Senate duties. He is expected to speak at the church 12 to 18 weekends a year, including Christmas and Easter, and plans to shift to emeritus status in 2030 based on a previously planned timeline.

== Personal life ==
Hamilton is married to LaVon Hamilton. They have two daughters.

== Electoral history ==
=== U.S. Senate ===
United States Senate Democratic primary in Kansas, 2026
Party	Candidate	Votes	%
Democratic	Adam Hamilton	77,607	34.6
Democratic	Christy Davis	31,857	14.2
Democratic	Noah Taylor	30,362	13.6
Democratic	Anne Parelkar	16,836	7.5
Democratic	Erik Murray	15,177	6.8
Democratic	Patrick Schmidt	13,403	6.0
Democratic	Sandy Spidel Neumann	12,717	5.7
Democratic	Jason Hart	12,412	5.5
Democratic	Damon Anderson	5,879	2.6
Democratic	Kevin Latz	4,110	1.8
Democratic	Michael Soetaert	3,716	1.7
Total votes		224,076	100.0

2026 United States Senate election in Kansas
Party	Candidate	Votes	%	±%
Democratic	Adam Hamilton	571,467	51.18	+9.39
Republican	Roger Marshall (incumbent)	511,212	45.79	–7.43
Libertarian	David Graham	33,830	3.03	–1.96
Total votes		1,116,509	100.0%	
Democratic gain from Republican				

== Awards and recognition ==
- Named one of the "Ten people to watch in America's spiritual landscape" by Religion and Ethics Newsweekly in 2000.
- Recognized as United Methodist Person of the Year by the United Methodist Reporter in 2012.
- Recognized in Kansas City with the first Founder's Civility Award by American Public Square at Jewell (APS) for his efforts in bringing the diverse Kansas City community together.
- Named the Distinguished Evangelist of The United Methodist Church in 2000 by the Foundation for Evangelism, and was recipient of the Harry Denman Award in Evangelism in 1995.

== Bibliography and sermons ==
- 24 Hours That Changed the World (ISBN 978-0-687-46555-2)
- Christianity and World Religions: Wrestling with Questions People Ask (ISBN 978-0-687-49430-9)
- Christianity's Family Tree: What Other Christians Believe and Why (ISBN 978-0-687-49116-2)
- Confronting the Controversies: A Christian Responds to the Tough Issues (ISBN 978-0-687-04567-9)
- Creed: What Christians Believe and Why (ISBN 978-1-7910-2788-9)
- Enough: Discovering Joy through Simplicity and Generosity (ISBN 978-1-4267-0233-4)
- Final Words From the Cross (ISBN 978-1-4267-4680-2)
- Forgiveness: Finding Peace Through Letting Go (ISBN 978-1-4267-4044-2)
- Half Truths: God Helps Those Who Help Themselves and Other Things the Bible Doesn't Say (ISBN 978-1-5018-1387-0)
- Incarnation: Rediscovering the Significance of Christmas (ISBN 978-1-7910-1641-8)
- John: The Gospel of Light and Life (ISBN 978-1-5018-0533-2)
- Leading Beyond the Walls: Developing Congregations with a Heart for the Unchurched (ISBN 978-1-4267-5485-2)
- Love to Stay: Sex, Grace, and Commitment (ISBN 978-1-4267-5951-2)
- Making Sense of the Bible: Rediscovering the Power of Scripture Today (ISBN 978-0-06-223496-4)
- Moses: In the Footsteps of the Reluctant Prophet (ISBN 978-1-7910-1514-5)
- Not a Silent Night: Mary Looks Back to Bethlehem (ISBN 978-1-4267-7184-2)
- Revival: Faith as Wesley Lived It (ISBN 978-1-4267-7884-1)
- Seeing Gray in a World of Black and White: Thoughts on Religion, Morality, and Politics (ISBN 978-1-4267-6662-6)
- Selling Swimsuits in the Arctic: Seven Simple Keys to Growing Churches (ISBN 978-0-687-34384-3)
- Speaking Well: Essential Skills for Speakers, Leaders, and Preachers (ISBN 978-1-5018-0993-4)
- The Call: The Life and Message of the Apostle Paul (ISBN 978-1-63088-262-4)
- The Journey: Walking the Road to Bethlehem (ISBN 978-1-4267-1425-2)
- The Lord's Prayer: The Meaning and Power of the Prayer Jesus Taught (ISBN 978-1-7910-2125-2)
- The Walk: Five Essential Practices of the Christian Life (ISBN 978-1-7910-2638-7)
- The Way: Walking in the Footsteps of Jesus (ISBN 978-1-4267-5251-3)
- Unafraid: Living with Courage and Hope in Uncertain Times (ISBN 978-1-5247-6033-5)
- Unleashing the Word: Preaching with Relevance, Purpose, and Passion (ISBN 978-1-4267-0700-1)
- When Christians Get It Wrong (ISBN 978-1-4267-7523-9)
- Why? Making Sense of God's Will (ISBN 978-1-4267-1478-8)
- Wrestling with Doubt, Finding Faith (ISBN 978-1-7910-2998-2)

Party political offices
Preceded by Barbara Bollier	Democratic nominee for U.S. Senator from Kansas (Class 2); 2026	Most recent
U.S. Senate
Preceded by Roger Marshall	U.S. Senator (Class 2) from Kansas; Taking office 2027; Served alongside: Jerry Moran	Elect
