= List of United States senators from Kansas =

Current delegation

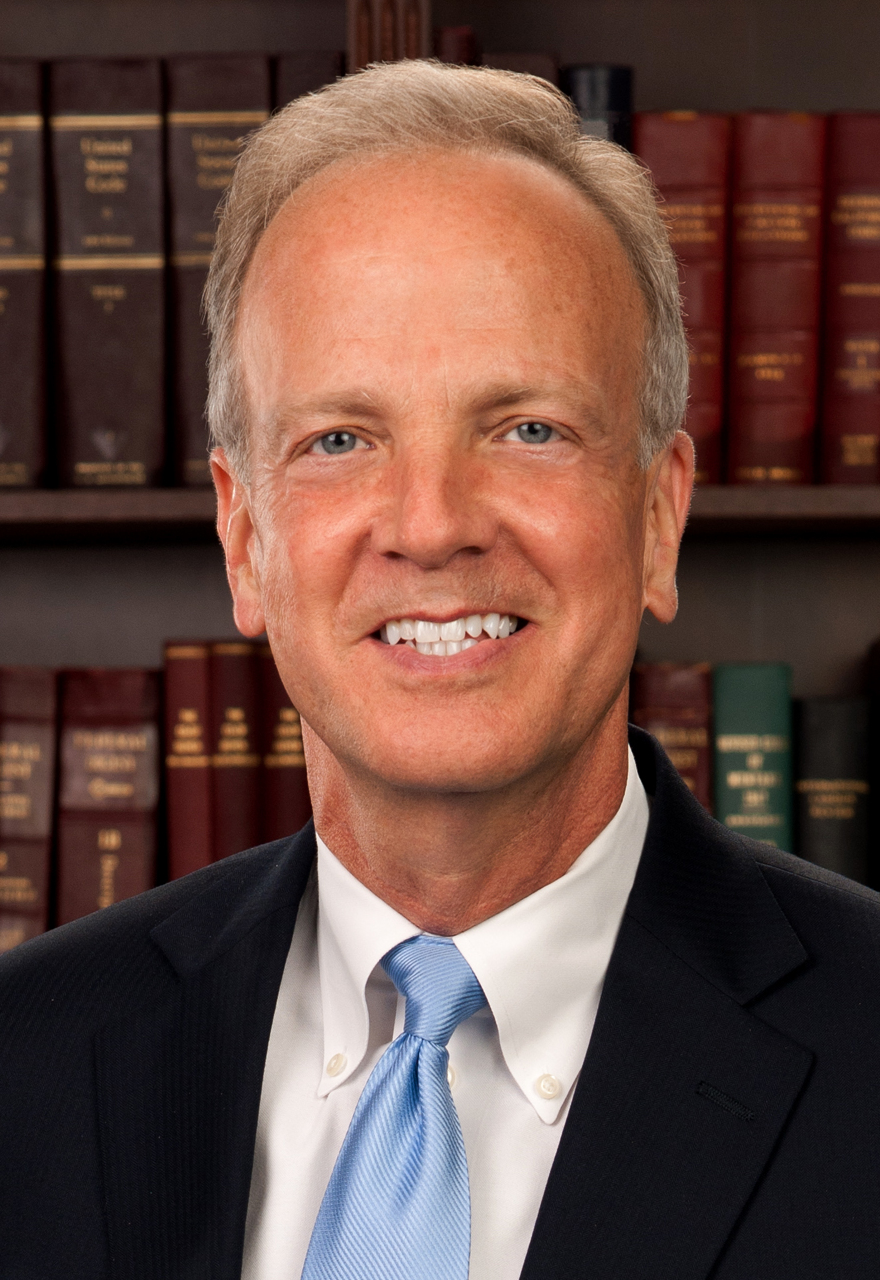
Jerry Moran
(R)

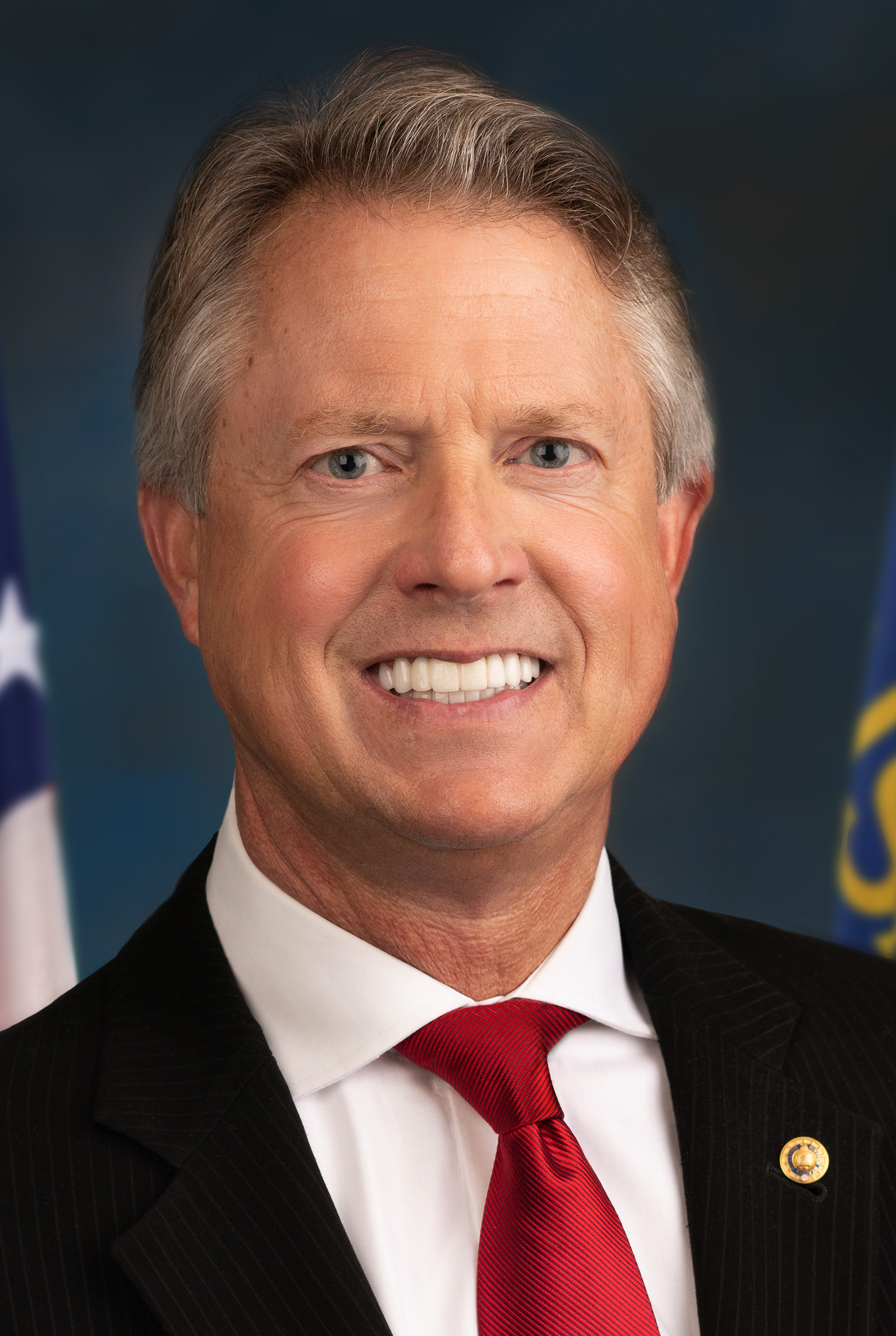
Roger Marshall
(R)

(ordered by seniority)

This is a list of United States senators from Kansas. Kansas was admitted to the Union on January 29, 1861, and its senators belong to class 2 and class 3. Kansas's current senators are Republicans Jerry Moran and Roger Marshall. 29 of Kansas's senators have been Republicans, three have been Democrats, and two have been Populists. Arthur Capper was the state's longest serving senator, served from 1919 to 1949.

In 2026, Kansas elected a Democratic senator for the first time since 1932. Both seats were occupied by Republicans from 1939 until 2026 when Democratic candidate Adam Hamilton won the class 2 seat. It was the longest current streak of one party controlling both of a state's Senate seats. Its class 2 seat had been occupied consecutively by Republicans since 1919, which was the longest current streak for a single seat in the country.

== List of senators ==
Class 2 Class 2 senators belong to the electoral cycle that most recently had regular elections in 2008, 2014, 2020, and 2026. The next election will be in 2032.						C	Class 3 Class 3 senators belong to the electoral cycle that most recently had regular elections in 2004, 2010, 2016, and 2022. The next election will be in 2028.					
#	Senator	Party	Dates in office	Electoral history	T	C	T	Electoral history	Dates in office	Party	Senator	#
Vacant			Jan 29, 1861 – Apr 4, 1861 (Note: Kansas did not elect its senators until two months after statehood.)		1	36th	—		Jan 29, 1861 – Apr 4, 1861	Vacant		
Vacant			Jan 29, 1861 – Apr 4, 1861		1	37th	1		Jan 29, 1861 – Apr 4, 1861	Vacant		
1	James H. Lane (Lawrence)	Republican	Apr 4, 1861 – Jul 11, 1866	Elected in 1861.	1	37th	1	Elected in 1861.	Apr 4, 1861 – Mar 3, 1873	Republican	Samuel C. Pomeroy (Atchison)	1
1	James H. Lane (Lawrence)	Republican	Apr 4, 1861 – Jul 11, 1866	Elected in 1861.	1	38th	1	Elected in 1861.	Apr 4, 1861 – Mar 3, 1873	Republican	Samuel C. Pomeroy (Atchison)	1
1	James H. Lane (Lawrence)	Republican	Apr 4, 1861 – Jul 11, 1866	Re-elected in 1865. Died.	2	39th	1	Elected in 1861.	Apr 4, 1861 – Mar 3, 1873	Republican	Samuel C. Pomeroy (Atchison)	1
Vacant			Jul 11, 1866 – Jul 25, 1866		2	39th	1	Elected in 1861.	Apr 4, 1861 – Mar 3, 1873	Republican	Samuel C. Pomeroy (Atchison)	1
2	Edmund Ross (Lawrence)	Republican	Jul 25, 1866 – Mar 3, 1871	Appointed to continue Lane's term. Elected in 1867 to finish Lane's term. Lost re-election.	2	39th	1	Elected in 1861.	Apr 4, 1861 – Mar 3, 1873	Republican	Samuel C. Pomeroy (Atchison)	1
2	Edmund Ross (Lawrence)	Republican	Jul 25, 1866 – Mar 3, 1871	Appointed to continue Lane's term. Elected in 1867 to finish Lane's term. Lost re-election.	2	40th	2	Re-elected in 1867. Lost re-election.	Apr 4, 1861 – Mar 3, 1873	Republican	Samuel C. Pomeroy (Atchison)	1
2	Edmund Ross (Lawrence)	Republican	Jul 25, 1866 – Mar 3, 1871	Appointed to continue Lane's term. Elected in 1867 to finish Lane's term. Lost re-election.	2	41st	2	Re-elected in 1867. Lost re-election.	Apr 4, 1861 – Mar 3, 1873	Republican	Samuel C. Pomeroy (Atchison)	1
3	Alexander Caldwell (Leavenworth)	Republican	Mar 4, 1871 – Mar 24, 1873	Elected in 1871. Resigned in 1873.	3	42nd	2	Re-elected in 1867. Lost re-election.	Apr 4, 1861 – Mar 3, 1873	Republican	Samuel C. Pomeroy (Atchison)	1
3	Alexander Caldwell (Leavenworth)	Republican	Mar 4, 1871 – Mar 24, 1873	Elected in 1871. Resigned in 1873.	3	43rd	3	Elected in 1873.	Mar 4, 1873 – Mar 3, 1891	Republican	John J. Ingalls (Atchison)	2
Vacant			Mar 24, 1873 – Nov 24, 1873		3	43rd	3	Elected in 1873.	Mar 4, 1873 – Mar 3, 1891	Republican	John J. Ingalls (Atchison)	2
4	Robert Crozier (Leavenworth)	Republican	Nov 24, 1873 – Feb 2, 1874	Appointed to continue Caldwell's term. Retired when successor elected.	3	43rd	3	Elected in 1873.	Mar 4, 1873 – Mar 3, 1891	Republican	John J. Ingalls (Atchison)	2
5	James Harvey (Vinton)	Republican	Feb 2, 1874 – Mar 3, 1877	Elected in 1874 to finish Caldwell's term. [data missing]	3	43rd	3	Elected in 1873.	Mar 4, 1873 – Mar 3, 1891	Republican	John J. Ingalls (Atchison)	2
5	James Harvey (Vinton)	Republican	Feb 2, 1874 – Mar 3, 1877	Elected in 1874 to finish Caldwell's term. [data missing]	3	44th	3	Elected in 1873.	Mar 4, 1873 – Mar 3, 1891	Republican	John J. Ingalls (Atchison)	2
6	Preston B. Plumb (Emporia)	Republican	Mar 4, 1877 – Dec 20, 1891	Elected in 1877.	4	45th	3	Elected in 1873.	Mar 4, 1873 – Mar 3, 1891	Republican	John J. Ingalls (Atchison)	2
6	Preston B. Plumb (Emporia)	Republican	Mar 4, 1877 – Dec 20, 1891	Elected in 1877.	4	46th	4	Re-elected in 1879.	Mar 4, 1873 – Mar 3, 1891	Republican	John J. Ingalls (Atchison)	2
6	Preston B. Plumb (Emporia)	Republican	Mar 4, 1877 – Dec 20, 1891	Elected in 1877.	4	47th	4	Re-elected in 1879.	Mar 4, 1873 – Mar 3, 1891	Republican	John J. Ingalls (Atchison)	2
6	Preston B. Plumb (Emporia)	Republican	Mar 4, 1877 – Dec 20, 1891	Re-elected in 1883.	5	48th	4	Re-elected in 1879.	Mar 4, 1873 – Mar 3, 1891	Republican	John J. Ingalls (Atchison)	2
6	Preston B. Plumb (Emporia)	Republican	Mar 4, 1877 – Dec 20, 1891	Re-elected in 1883.	5	49th	5	Re-elected in 1885. Lost re-election.	Mar 4, 1873 – Mar 3, 1891	Republican	John J. Ingalls (Atchison)	2
6	Preston B. Plumb (Emporia)	Republican	Mar 4, 1877 – Dec 20, 1891	Re-elected in 1883.	5	50th	5	Re-elected in 1885. Lost re-election.	Mar 4, 1873 – Mar 3, 1891	Republican	John J. Ingalls (Atchison)	2
6	Preston B. Plumb (Emporia)	Republican	Mar 4, 1877 – Dec 20, 1891	Re-elected in 1888. Died.	6	51st	5	Re-elected in 1885. Lost re-election.	Mar 4, 1873 – Mar 3, 1891	Republican	John J. Ingalls (Atchison)	2
6	Preston B. Plumb (Emporia)	Republican	Mar 4, 1877 – Dec 20, 1891	Re-elected in 1888. Died.	6	52nd	6	Elected in 1891. Lost re-nomination.	Mar 4, 1891 – Mar 3, 1897	Populist	William A. Peffer (Topeka)	3
Vacant			Dec 20, 1891 – Jan 1, 1892		6	52nd	6	Elected in 1891. Lost re-nomination.	Mar 4, 1891 – Mar 3, 1897	Populist	William A. Peffer (Topeka)	3
7	Bishop Perkins (Oswego)	Republican	Jan 1, 1892 – Mar 3, 1893	Appointed to continue Plumb's term. Retired when successor qualified.	6	52nd	6	Elected in 1891. Lost re-nomination.	Mar 4, 1891 – Mar 3, 1897	Populist	William A. Peffer (Topeka)	3
8	John Martin (Topeka)	Democratic	Mar 4, 1893 – Mar 3, 1895	Elected in 1893 to finish Plumb's term. [data missing]	6	53rd	6	Elected in 1891. Lost re-nomination.	Mar 4, 1891 – Mar 3, 1897	Populist	William A. Peffer (Topeka)	3
9	Lucien Baker (Leavenworth)	Republican	Mar 4, 1895 – Mar 3, 1901	Elected in 1895. Lost renomination.	7	54th	6	Elected in 1891. Lost re-nomination.	Mar 4, 1891 – Mar 3, 1897	Populist	William A. Peffer (Topeka)	3
9	Lucien Baker (Leavenworth)	Republican	Mar 4, 1895 – Mar 3, 1901	Elected in 1895. Lost renomination.	7	55th	7	Elected in 1897. Lost re-election.	Mar 4, 1897 – Mar 3, 1903	Populist	William Harris (Linwood)	4
9	Lucien Baker (Leavenworth)	Republican	Mar 4, 1895 – Mar 3, 1901	Elected in 1895. Lost renomination.	7	56th	7	Elected in 1897. Lost re-election.	Mar 4, 1897 – Mar 3, 1903	Populist	William Harris (Linwood)	4
10	Joseph Burton (Abilene)	Republican	Mar 4, 1901 – Jun 4, 1906	Elected in 1901. Resigned when convicted of bribery.	8	57th	7	Elected in 1897. Lost re-election.	Mar 4, 1897 – Mar 3, 1903	Populist	William Harris (Linwood)	4
10	Joseph Burton (Abilene)	Republican	Mar 4, 1901 – Jun 4, 1906	Elected in 1901. Resigned when convicted of bribery.	8	58th	8	Elected in 1903. Lost renomination.	Mar 4, 1903 – Mar 3, 1909	Republican	Chester I. Long (Medicine Lodge)	5
10	Joseph Burton (Abilene)	Republican	Mar 4, 1901 – Jun 4, 1906	Elected in 1901. Resigned when convicted of bribery.	8	59th	8	Elected in 1903. Lost renomination.	Mar 4, 1903 – Mar 3, 1909	Republican	Chester I. Long (Medicine Lodge)	5
Vacant			Jun 4, 1906 – Jun 11, 1906		8	59th	8	Elected in 1903. Lost renomination.	Mar 4, 1903 – Mar 3, 1909	Republican	Chester I. Long (Medicine Lodge)	5
11	Alfred Benson (Ottawa)	Republican	Jun 11, 1906 – Jan 22, 1907	Appointed to continue Burton's term. Lost election to finish Burton's term.	8	59th	8	Elected in 1903. Lost renomination.	Mar 4, 1903 – Mar 3, 1909	Republican	Chester I. Long (Medicine Lodge)	5
12	Charles Curtis (Topeka)	Republican	Jan 22, 1907 – Mar 3, 1913	Elected in 1907 to finish Burton's term.	8	59th	8	Elected in 1903. Lost renomination.	Mar 4, 1903 – Mar 3, 1909	Republican	Chester I. Long (Medicine Lodge)	5
12	Charles Curtis (Topeka)	Republican	Jan 22, 1907 – Mar 3, 1913	Elected in 1907 to the next term. Lost renomination.	9	60th	8	Elected in 1903. Lost renomination.	Mar 4, 1903 – Mar 3, 1909	Republican	Chester I. Long (Medicine Lodge)	5
12	Charles Curtis (Topeka)	Republican	Jan 22, 1907 – Mar 3, 1913	Elected in 1907 to the next term. Lost renomination.	9	61st	9	Elected in 1909. Lost renomination.	Mar 4, 1909 – Mar 3, 1915	Republican	Joseph Bristow (Salina)	6
12	Charles Curtis (Topeka)	Republican	Jan 22, 1907 – Mar 3, 1913	Elected in 1907 to the next term. Lost renomination.	9	62nd	9	Elected in 1909. Lost renomination.	Mar 4, 1909 – Mar 3, 1915	Republican	Joseph Bristow (Salina)	6
13	William H. Thompson (Kansas City)	Democratic	Mar 4, 1913 – Mar 3, 1919	Elected in 1913. Lost re-election.	10	63rd	9	Elected in 1909. Lost renomination.	Mar 4, 1909 – Mar 3, 1915	Republican	Joseph Bristow (Salina)	6
13	William H. Thompson (Kansas City)	Democratic	Mar 4, 1913 – Mar 3, 1919	Elected in 1913. Lost re-election.	10	64th	10	Elected in 1914.	Mar 4, 1915 – Mar 3, 1929	Republican	Charles Curtis (Topeka)	7
13	William H. Thompson (Kansas City)	Democratic	Mar 4, 1913 – Mar 3, 1919	Elected in 1913. Lost re-election.	10	65th	10	Elected in 1914.	Mar 4, 1915 – Mar 3, 1929	Republican	Charles Curtis (Topeka)	7
14	Arthur Capper (Topeka)	Republican	Mar 4, 1919 – Jan 3, 1949	Elected in 1918.	11	66th	10	Elected in 1914.	Mar 4, 1915 – Mar 3, 1929	Republican	Charles Curtis (Topeka)	7
14	Arthur Capper (Topeka)	Republican	Mar 4, 1919 – Jan 3, 1949	Elected in 1918.	11	67th	11	Re-elected in 1920.	Mar 4, 1915 – Mar 3, 1929	Republican	Charles Curtis (Topeka)	7
14	Arthur Capper (Topeka)	Republican	Mar 4, 1919 – Jan 3, 1949	Elected in 1918.	11	68th	11	Re-elected in 1920.	Mar 4, 1915 – Mar 3, 1929	Republican	Charles Curtis (Topeka)	7
14	Arthur Capper (Topeka)	Republican	Mar 4, 1919 – Jan 3, 1949	Re-elected in 1924.	12	69th	11	Re-elected in 1920.	Mar 4, 1915 – Mar 3, 1929	Republican	Charles Curtis (Topeka)	7
14	Arthur Capper (Topeka)	Republican	Mar 4, 1919 – Jan 3, 1949	Re-elected in 1924.	12	70th	12	Re-elected in 1926. Resigned to become U.S. Vice President.	Mar 4, 1915 – Mar 3, 1929	Republican	Charles Curtis (Topeka)	7
14	Arthur Capper (Topeka)	Republican	Mar 4, 1919 – Jan 3, 1949	Re-elected in 1924.	12	71st	12		Mar 3, 1929 – Apr 1, 1929	Vacant		
14	Arthur Capper (Topeka)	Republican	Mar 4, 1919 – Jan 3, 1949	Re-elected in 1924.	12	71st	12	Appointed to continue Curtis's term. Lost election to finish Curtis's term.	Apr 1, 1929 – Nov 30, 1930	Republican	Henry J. Allen (Wichita)	8
14	Arthur Capper (Topeka)	Republican	Mar 4, 1919 – Jan 3, 1949	Re-elected in 1924.	12	71st	12	Elected in 1930 to finish Curtis's term.	Dec 1, 1930 – Jan 3, 1939	Democratic	George McGill (Wichita)	9
14	Arthur Capper (Topeka)	Republican	Mar 4, 1919 – Jan 3, 1949	Re-elected in 1930.	13	72nd	12	Elected in 1930 to finish Curtis's term.	Dec 1, 1930 – Jan 3, 1939	Democratic	George McGill (Wichita)	9
14	Arthur Capper (Topeka)	Republican	Mar 4, 1919 – Jan 3, 1949	Re-elected in 1930.	13	73rd	13	Re-elected in 1932. Lost re-election.	Dec 1, 1930 – Jan 3, 1939	Democratic	George McGill (Wichita)	9
14	Arthur Capper (Topeka)	Republican	Mar 4, 1919 – Jan 3, 1949	Re-elected in 1930.	13	74th	13	Re-elected in 1932. Lost re-election.	Dec 1, 1930 – Jan 3, 1939	Democratic	George McGill (Wichita)	9
14	Arthur Capper (Topeka)	Republican	Mar 4, 1919 – Jan 3, 1949	Re-elected in 1936.	14	75th	13	Re-elected in 1932. Lost re-election.	Dec 1, 1930 – Jan 3, 1939	Democratic	George McGill (Wichita)	9
14	Arthur Capper (Topeka)	Republican	Mar 4, 1919 – Jan 3, 1949	Re-elected in 1936.	14	76th	14	Elected in 1938.	Jan 3, 1939 – Nov 8, 1949	Republican	Clyde M. Reed (Parsons)	10
14	Arthur Capper (Topeka)	Republican	Mar 4, 1919 – Jan 3, 1949	Re-elected in 1936.	14	77th	14	Elected in 1938.	Jan 3, 1939 – Nov 8, 1949	Republican	Clyde M. Reed (Parsons)	10
14	Arthur Capper (Topeka)	Republican	Mar 4, 1919 – Jan 3, 1949	Re-elected in 1942. Retired	15	78th	14	Elected in 1938.	Jan 3, 1939 – Nov 8, 1949	Republican	Clyde M. Reed (Parsons)	10
14	Arthur Capper (Topeka)	Republican	Mar 4, 1919 – Jan 3, 1949	Re-elected in 1942. Retired	15	79th	15	Re-elected in 1944. Died.	Jan 3, 1939 – Nov 8, 1949	Republican	Clyde M. Reed (Parsons)	10
14	Arthur Capper (Topeka)	Republican	Mar 4, 1919 – Jan 3, 1949	Re-elected in 1942. Retired	15	80th	15	Re-elected in 1944. Died.	Jan 3, 1939 – Nov 8, 1949	Republican	Clyde M. Reed (Parsons)	10
15	Andrew Schoeppel (Wichita)	Republican	Jan 3, 1949 – Jan 21, 1962	Elected in 1948.	16	81st	15	Re-elected in 1944. Died.	Jan 3, 1939 – Nov 8, 1949	Republican	Clyde M. Reed (Parsons)	10
15	Andrew Schoeppel (Wichita)	Republican	Jan 3, 1949 – Jan 21, 1962	Elected in 1948.	16	81st	15		Nov 8, 1949 – Dec 2, 1949	Vacant		
15	Andrew Schoeppel (Wichita)	Republican	Jan 3, 1949 – Jan 21, 1962	Elected in 1948.	16	81st	15	Appointed to continue Reed's term. Retired when successor elected.	Dec 2, 1949 – Nov 28, 1950	Republican	Harry Darby (Kansas City)	11
15	Andrew Schoeppel (Wichita)	Republican	Jan 3, 1949 – Jan 21, 1962	Elected in 1948.	16	81st	15	Elected in 1950 to finish Reed's term.	Nov 29, 1950 – Jan 3, 1969	Republican	Frank Carlson (Concordia)	12
15	Andrew Schoeppel (Wichita)	Republican	Jan 3, 1949 – Jan 21, 1962	Elected in 1948.	16	82nd	16	Elected to full term in 1950.	Nov 29, 1950 – Jan 3, 1969	Republican	Frank Carlson (Concordia)	12
15	Andrew Schoeppel (Wichita)	Republican	Jan 3, 1949 – Jan 21, 1962	Elected in 1948.	16	83rd	16	Elected to full term in 1950.	Nov 29, 1950 – Jan 3, 1969	Republican	Frank Carlson (Concordia)	12
15	Andrew Schoeppel (Wichita)	Republican	Jan 3, 1949 – Jan 21, 1962	Re-elected in 1954.	17	84th	16	Elected to full term in 1950.	Nov 29, 1950 – Jan 3, 1969	Republican	Frank Carlson (Concordia)	12
15	Andrew Schoeppel (Wichita)	Republican	Jan 3, 1949 – Jan 21, 1962	Re-elected in 1954.	17	85th	17	Re-elected in 1956.	Nov 29, 1950 – Jan 3, 1969	Republican	Frank Carlson (Concordia)	12
15	Andrew Schoeppel (Wichita)	Republican	Jan 3, 1949 – Jan 21, 1962	Re-elected in 1954.	17	86th	17	Re-elected in 1956.	Nov 29, 1950 – Jan 3, 1969	Republican	Frank Carlson (Concordia)	12
15	Andrew Schoeppel (Wichita)	Republican	Jan 3, 1949 – Jan 21, 1962	Re-elected in 1960. Died.	18	87th	17	Re-elected in 1956.	Nov 29, 1950 – Jan 3, 1969	Republican	Frank Carlson (Concordia)	12
Vacant			Jan 21, 1962 – Jan 31, 1962		18	87th	17	Re-elected in 1956.	Nov 29, 1950 – Jan 3, 1969	Republican	Frank Carlson (Concordia)	12
16	James B. Pearson (Prairie Village)	Republican	Jan 31, 1962 – Dec 23, 1978	Appointed to continue Schoeppel's term. Elected in 1962 to finish Schoeppel's term.	18	87th	17	Re-elected in 1956.	Nov 29, 1950 – Jan 3, 1969	Republican	Frank Carlson (Concordia)	12
16	James B. Pearson (Prairie Village)	Republican	Jan 31, 1962 – Dec 23, 1978	Appointed to continue Schoeppel's term. Elected in 1962 to finish Schoeppel's term.	18	88th	18	Re-elected in 1962. Retired	Nov 29, 1950 – Jan 3, 1969	Republican	Frank Carlson (Concordia)	12
16	James B. Pearson (Prairie Village)	Republican	Jan 31, 1962 – Dec 23, 1978	Appointed to continue Schoeppel's term. Elected in 1962 to finish Schoeppel's term.	18	89th	18	Re-elected in 1962. Retired	Nov 29, 1950 – Jan 3, 1969	Republican	Frank Carlson (Concordia)	12
16	James B. Pearson (Prairie Village)	Republican	Jan 31, 1962 – Dec 23, 1978	Re-elected in 1966.	19	90th	18	Re-elected in 1962. Retired	Nov 29, 1950 – Jan 3, 1969	Republican	Frank Carlson (Concordia)	12
16	James B. Pearson (Prairie Village)	Republican	Jan 31, 1962 – Dec 23, 1978	Re-elected in 1966.	19	91st	19	Elected in 1968.	Jan 3, 1969 – June 11, 1996	Republican	Bob Dole (Russell)	13
16	James B. Pearson (Prairie Village)	Republican	Jan 31, 1962 – Dec 23, 1978	Re-elected in 1966.	19	92nd	19	Elected in 1968.	Jan 3, 1969 – June 11, 1996	Republican	Bob Dole (Russell)	13
16	James B. Pearson (Prairie Village)	Republican	Jan 31, 1962 – Dec 23, 1978	Re-elected in 1972. Retired and resigned early to allow successor to gain seniority.	20	93rd	19	Elected in 1968.	Jan 3, 1969 – June 11, 1996	Republican	Bob Dole (Russell)	13
16	James B. Pearson (Prairie Village)	Republican	Jan 31, 1962 – Dec 23, 1978	Re-elected in 1972. Retired and resigned early to allow successor to gain seniority.	20	94th	20	Re-elected in 1974.	Jan 3, 1969 – June 11, 1996	Republican	Bob Dole (Russell)	13
16	James B. Pearson (Prairie Village)	Republican	Jan 31, 1962 – Dec 23, 1978	Re-elected in 1972. Retired and resigned early to allow successor to gain seniority.	20	95th	20	Re-elected in 1974.	Jan 3, 1969 – June 11, 1996	Republican	Bob Dole (Russell)	13
17	Nancy Kassebaum (Wichita)	Republican	Dec 23, 1978 – Jan 3, 1997	Appointed to finish Pearson's term, having already been elected to the next term.	20	95th	20	Re-elected in 1974.	Jan 3, 1969 – June 11, 1996	Republican	Bob Dole (Russell)	13
17	Nancy Kassebaum (Wichita)	Republican	Dec 23, 1978 – Jan 3, 1997	Elected in 1978.	21	96th	20	Re-elected in 1974.	Jan 3, 1969 – June 11, 1996	Republican	Bob Dole (Russell)	13
17	Nancy Kassebaum (Wichita)	Republican	Dec 23, 1978 – Jan 3, 1997	Elected in 1978.	21	97th	21	Re-elected in 1980.	Jan 3, 1969 – June 11, 1996	Republican	Bob Dole (Russell)	13
17	Nancy Kassebaum (Wichita)	Republican	Dec 23, 1978 – Jan 3, 1997	Elected in 1978.	21	98th	21	Re-elected in 1980.	Jan 3, 1969 – June 11, 1996	Republican	Bob Dole (Russell)	13
17	Nancy Kassebaum (Wichita)	Republican	Dec 23, 1978 – Jan 3, 1997	Re-elected in 1984.	22	99th	21	Re-elected in 1980.	Jan 3, 1969 – June 11, 1996	Republican	Bob Dole (Russell)	13
17	Nancy Kassebaum (Wichita)	Republican	Dec 23, 1978 – Jan 3, 1997	Re-elected in 1984.	22	100th	22	Re-elected in 1986.	Jan 3, 1969 – June 11, 1996	Republican	Bob Dole (Russell)	13
17	Nancy Kassebaum (Wichita)	Republican	Dec 23, 1978 – Jan 3, 1997	Re-elected in 1984.	22	101st	22	Re-elected in 1986.	Jan 3, 1969 – June 11, 1996	Republican	Bob Dole (Russell)	13
17	Nancy Kassebaum (Wichita)	Republican	Dec 23, 1978 – Jan 3, 1997	Re-elected in 1990. Retired.	23	102nd	22	Re-elected in 1986.	Jan 3, 1969 – June 11, 1996	Republican	Bob Dole (Russell)	13
17	Nancy Kassebaum (Wichita)	Republican	Dec 23, 1978 – Jan 3, 1997	Re-elected in 1990. Retired.	23	103rd	23	Re-elected in 1992. Resigned to campaign for U.S. President.	Jan 3, 1969 – June 11, 1996	Republican	Bob Dole (Russell)	13
17	Nancy Kassebaum (Wichita)	Republican	Dec 23, 1978 – Jan 3, 1997	Re-elected in 1990. Retired.	23	104th	23	Re-elected in 1992. Resigned to campaign for U.S. President.	Jan 3, 1969 – June 11, 1996	Republican	Bob Dole (Russell)	13
17	Nancy Kassebaum (Wichita)	Republican	Dec 23, 1978 – Jan 3, 1997	Re-elected in 1990. Retired.	23	104th	23	Appointed to continue Dole's term. Lost nomination to finish Dole's term.	Jun 11, 1996 – Nov 7, 1996	Republican	Sheila Frahm (Colby)	14
17	Nancy Kassebaum (Wichita)	Republican	Dec 23, 1978 – Jan 3, 1997	Re-elected in 1990. Retired.	23	104th	23	Elected in 1996 to finish Dole's term	Nov 7, 1996 – Jan 3, 2011	Republican	Sam Brownback (Topeka)	15
18	Pat Roberts (Dodge City)	Republican	Jan 3, 1997 – Jan 3, 2021	Elected in 1996.	24	105th	23	Elected in 1996 to finish Dole's term	Nov 7, 1996 – Jan 3, 2011	Republican	Sam Brownback (Topeka)	15
18	Pat Roberts (Dodge City)	Republican	Jan 3, 1997 – Jan 3, 2021	Elected in 1996.	24	106th	24	Re-elected in 1998.	Nov 7, 1996 – Jan 3, 2011	Republican	Sam Brownback (Topeka)	15
18	Pat Roberts (Dodge City)	Republican	Jan 3, 1997 – Jan 3, 2021	Elected in 1996.	24	107th	24	Re-elected in 1998.	Nov 7, 1996 – Jan 3, 2011	Republican	Sam Brownback (Topeka)	15
18	Pat Roberts (Dodge City)	Republican	Jan 3, 1997 – Jan 3, 2021	Re-elected in 2002.	25	108th	24	Re-elected in 1998.	Nov 7, 1996 – Jan 3, 2011	Republican	Sam Brownback (Topeka)	15
18	Pat Roberts (Dodge City)	Republican	Jan 3, 1997 – Jan 3, 2021	Re-elected in 2002.	25	109th	25	Re-elected in 2004. Retired to run for Governor of Kansas.	Nov 7, 1996 – Jan 3, 2011	Republican	Sam Brownback (Topeka)	15
18	Pat Roberts (Dodge City)	Republican	Jan 3, 1997 – Jan 3, 2021	Re-elected in 2002.	25	110th	25	Re-elected in 2004. Retired to run for Governor of Kansas.	Nov 7, 1996 – Jan 3, 2011	Republican	Sam Brownback (Topeka)	15
18	Pat Roberts (Dodge City)	Republican	Jan 3, 1997 – Jan 3, 2021	Re-elected in 2008.	26	111th	25	Re-elected in 2004. Retired to run for Governor of Kansas.	Nov 7, 1996 – Jan 3, 2011	Republican	Sam Brownback (Topeka)	15
18	Pat Roberts (Dodge City)	Republican	Jan 3, 1997 – Jan 3, 2021	Re-elected in 2008.	26	112th	26	Elected in 2010.	Jan 3, 2011 – present	Republican	Jerry Moran (Manhattan)	16
18	Pat Roberts (Dodge City)	Republican	Jan 3, 1997 – Jan 3, 2021	Re-elected in 2008.	26	113th	26	Elected in 2010.	Jan 3, 2011 – present	Republican	Jerry Moran (Manhattan)	16
18	Pat Roberts (Dodge City)	Republican	Jan 3, 1997 – Jan 3, 2021	Re-elected in 2014. Retired.	27	114th	26	Elected in 2010.	Jan 3, 2011 – present	Republican	Jerry Moran (Manhattan)	16
18	Pat Roberts (Dodge City)	Republican	Jan 3, 1997 – Jan 3, 2021	Re-elected in 2014. Retired.	27	115th	27	Re-elected in 2016.	Jan 3, 2011 – present	Republican	Jerry Moran (Manhattan)	16
18	Pat Roberts (Dodge City)	Republican	Jan 3, 1997 – Jan 3, 2021	Re-elected in 2014. Retired.	27	116th	27	Re-elected in 2016.	Jan 3, 2011 – present	Republican	Jerry Moran (Manhattan)	16
19	Roger Marshall (Great Bend)	Republican	Jan 3, 2021 – present	Elected in 2020. Lost re-election.	28	117th	27	Re-elected in 2016.	Jan 3, 2011 – present	Republican	Jerry Moran (Manhattan)	16
19	Roger Marshall (Great Bend)	Republican	Jan 3, 2021 – present	Elected in 2020. Lost re-election.	28	118th	28	Re-elected in 2022.	Jan 3, 2011 – present	Republican	Jerry Moran (Manhattan)	16
19	Roger Marshall (Great Bend)	Republican	Jan 3, 2021 – present	Elected in 2020. Lost re-election.	28	119th	28	Re-elected in 2022.	Jan 3, 2011 – present	Republican	Jerry Moran (Manhattan)	16
20	Adam Hamilton (elect) (Stillwell)	Democratic	Taking office Jan 3, 2027	Elected in 2026.	29	120th	28	Re-elected in 2022.	Jan 3, 2011 – present	Republican	Jerry Moran (Manhattan)	16
20	Adam Hamilton (elect) (Stillwell)	Democratic	Taking office Jan 3, 2027	Elected in 2026.	29	121st	29	To be determined in the 2028 election.				
20	Adam Hamilton (elect) (Stillwell)	Democratic	Taking office Jan 3, 2027	Elected in 2026.	29	122nd	29	To be determined in the 2028 election.				
To be determined in the 2032 election.					30	123rd	29	To be determined in the 2028 election.				

== See also ==
- Elections in Kansas
- Kansas's congressional delegations
- List of United States representatives from Kansas
