= Roger Marshall =

American politician and physician (born 1960)

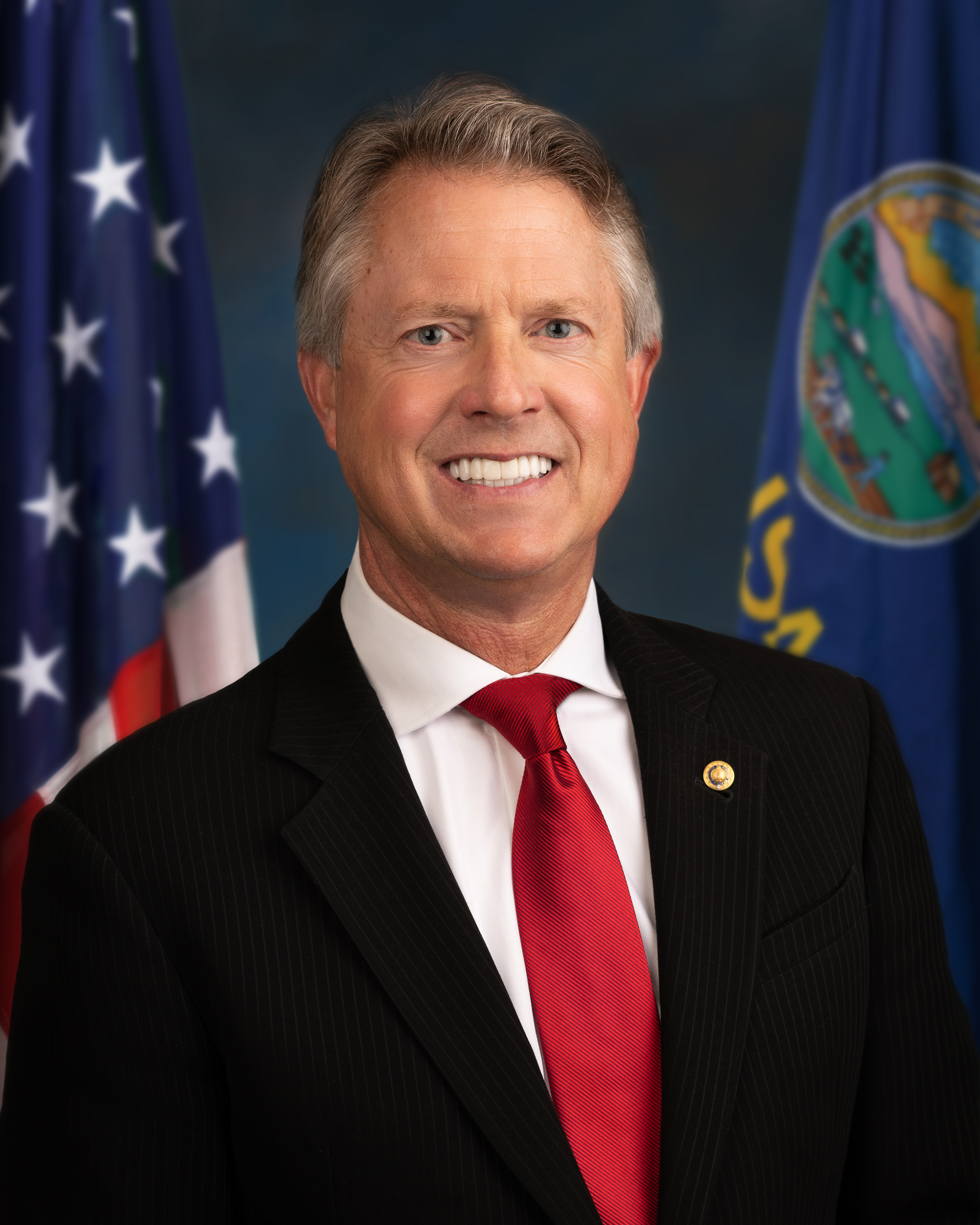
- Official portrait, 2021

United States Senator from Kansas
- Incumbent
- Assumed office January 3, 2021 Serving with Jerry Moran
- Preceded by: Pat Roberts

Member of the U.S. House of Representatives from Kansas's 1st district
- In office January 3, 2017 – January 3, 2021
- Preceded by: Tim Huelskamp
- Succeeded by: Tracey Mann

Personal details
- Born: Roger Wayne Marshall; August 9, 1960 (age 66) El Dorado, Kansas, U.S.
- Party: Republican
- Spouse: Laina Marshall (m. 1983)
- Children: 4
- Education: Butler Community College (attended); Kansas State University (BS); University of Kansas (MD)
- Website: Senate website Campaign website

Military service
- Branch/service: United States Army; Army Reserve
- Years of service: 1984–1991
- Rank: Captain
- Marshall's voice Marshall comments on faults in the U.S. healthcare system Recorded May 9, 2022

Roger Wayne Marshall (born August 9, 1960) is an American politician and physician serving as the junior United States senator from Kansas, a seat he has held since 2021. A member of the Republican Party, he served as the U.S. representative for Kansas's 1st congressional district from 2017 until 2021.

Marshall practiced medicine as an obstetrician for more than 25 years before being elected to Congress in 2016. He was reelected in 2018 and elected to the U.S. Senate in 2020. He ran for reelection in 2026, but lost to Democratic nominee Adam Hamilton.

== Early life and education ==
Marshall was born in El Dorado, Kansas, in the fifth generation of a farming family. Both of his grandfathers owned farms on which he worked as a child, his father was a police chief, and his mother an office clerk. His generation was the first to go to college, and he attended Butler Community College before studying at Kansas State University, where he received a Bachelor of Science in biochemistry and was a member of the Beta Theta Pi fraternity.

Marshall received his Doctor of Medicine from the University of Kansas. He completed a residency in obstetrics and gynecology at Bayfront Medical Center in St. Petersburg, Florida.

== Physician career ==
In 1998, Marshall and eight other doctors opened Great Bend Regional Medical Center in Great Bend, Kansas, where he worked as an obstetrician-gynecologist. From 1998 to 2012 he was owner and 2013 to 2019 co-owner of Heartland Regional OBGYN.

According to a September 2026 New York Times report, Marshall charged patients an 18% annual interest rate on medical debt, and he and Heartland Regional sued more than 700 patients for bills ranging from $101 to thousands of dollars. Reportedly at the request of Marshall's lawyers, at least 81 defendants were arrested for not appearing in court.

Marshall responded by saying his medical firm only used "common business practices", calling the report a "hit job". His spokesperson said he treated all patients regardless of ability to pay, that he welcomed Medicaid patients, that his firm used standard billing and collection procedures, and that his firm provided millions of dollars in free medical care.

Marshall served as vice president of the Farmers Bank and Trust, and was a district governor of Rotary International. He also served seven years in the United States Army Reserve, where he trained a mobile hospital support unit, reaching the rank of captain.

== U.S. House of Representatives ==
=== 2016 campaign ===
2016 Republican primary results Marshall: 50–60%; 60–70%; Huelskamp: 50–60%; 60–70%

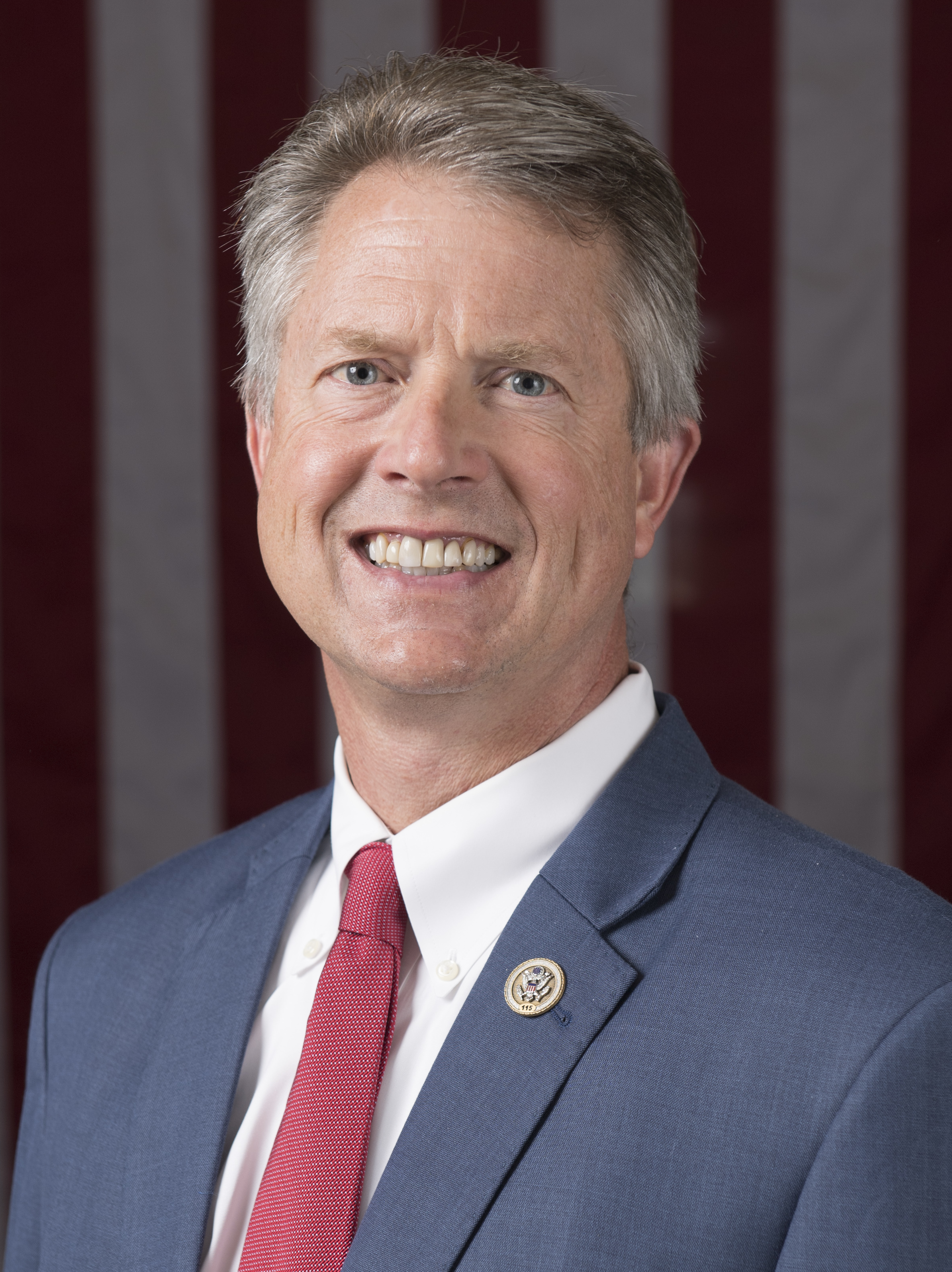
Marshall during the 115th Congress

Marshall ran against incumbent Tim Huelskamp in the Republican Party primary election for Kansas's 1st congressional district in the United States House of Representatives.

Marshall had the support of many of Kansas's agricultural groups, who were angry that Huelskamp lost his seat on the House Agriculture Committee, the first time in a century that no Kansan was on that panel. Marshall was endorsed by the United States Chamber of Commerce, the Kansas Livestock Association, the National Association of Wheat Growers, and the Kansas Farm Bureau, an affiliate of the American Farm Bureau Federation.

During the primary, Huelskamp criticized Marshall over a 2008 confrontation with a neighbor during a land dispute. The neighbor accused Marshall in a 911 call of trying to run him over with his truck. The Barton County Sheriff's Office filed a complaint charging Marshall with battery and reckless driving. Prosecutor Carey Fleske dropped the battery charge as part of plea negotiations, and Marshall pleaded no contest to reckless driving. On Christmas Eve, Fleske (whose father was Marshall's business partner and neighbor) obtained a court order from a different judge who was available, replacing the conviction with a minor traffic infraction on the basis that the earlier documents had been typed up incorrectly.

On August 2, Marshall defeated Huelskamp in the Republican primary, 56% to 44%. No Democrat filed to run in the heavily Republican district. In the general election, Marshall defeated independent candidate Alan LaPolice and Libertarian Kerry Burt with 65.9% of the vote.

=== Tenure ===
Marshall was sworn into office by House Speaker Paul Ryan on January 3, 2017. As a congressman, Marshall regained a seat for his district on the House Agriculture Committee after a three-year lapse, which positioned him to protect crop insurance. The 2018 Farm Bill then did so, while also protecting the Supplemental Nutrition Assistance Program (SNAP).

On October 23, 2019, Marshall was part of a group of 15–30 House Republicans, led by Representative Matt Gaetz, who intruded upon that day's confidential hearing of the House Intelligence Committee. The Republican and Democratic committee members were meeting in a Sensitive Compartmented Information Facility (SCIF) to hear testimony from Deputy Assistant Secretary of Defense Laura Cooper in connection with the impeachment inquiry against Donald Trump. Marshall was one of a group of Republicans that followed Gaetz to the hearing room. Marshall called the impeachment inquiry a "sham" and contended that "the people of Kansas are sick and tired of these impeachment hearings."

List of Committee assignments

- Committee on Agriculture
  - Subcommittee on Commodity Exchanges, Energy, and Credit
  - Subcommittee on Nutrition
  - Subcommittee on Livestock and Foreign Agriculture
- Committee on Science, Space, and Technology
  - Subcommittee on Oversight
  - Subcommittee on Research and Technology
- Committee on Small Business
  - Subcommittee on Health and Technology
  - Subcommittee on Contracting and Workforce

== U.S. Senate ==
Marshall was sworn into office on January 3, 2021.

=== Elections ===
==== 2020 ====
2020 Republican primary results Marshall: 30–40%; 40–50%; 50–60%; 60–70%; Kobach: 30–40%; 40–50%; Hamilton: 30–40%; 40–50%; 50–60%

In September 2019, Marshall announced he would give up his House seat to run for the Senate seat being vacated by four-term incumbent Pat Roberts. In the Republican primary election, Marshall faced Kris Kobach, a polarizing ex-Kansas Secretary of State and Donald Trump ally known for his far-right views. Senate Republican leaders, fearing that Kobach's nomination would endanger their majority in the Senate, urged Trump to endorse Marshall; Trump did not. The U.S. Chamber of Commerce, the Kansas Farm Bureau and several anti-abortion organizations supported Marshall. The National Republican Senatorial Committee launched a major voter contact effort ("Operation Scorched Prairie") on Marshall's behalf making 2.3 million unique voter contacts via text and robocalls in the week before the election.

The campaigns and outside (super PACs) spent millions in attack ads; the primary was anticipated to be close, but Marshall won by 14.2 percentage points with 40.3% of the vote, although the second-place finisher (Kobach) and third-place finisher (Kansas City based plumber Bob Hamilton) combined for a higher total.

Marshall during the 117th Congress

Marshall won all but one county west of Emporia. In Sedgwick County, which contains Wichita, he beat Kobach 47% to 26%. He lost by a majority in Wyandotte County, which contains Kansas City, and by pluralities in most counties in eastern Kansas. In the general election, Marshall defeated Democratic State Senator Barbara Bollier 53% to 42%, with the Libertarian Jason Buckley receiving 5%. He succeeded Roberts, who represented the 1st from 1981 to 1997; Kansas's senior senator, Jerry Moran, represented the district from 1997 to 2011.

==== 2026 ====
Marshall announced his candidacy for reelection in July 2025. He faced Democratic nominee Adam Hamilton in the general election. Hamilton defeated Marshall in a closely contested race, becoming the first Democrat elected to a U.S. Senate seat from Kansas in 94 years.

=== Tenure ===
In October 2021, Business Insider reported that Marshall had violated the Stop Trading on Congressional Knowledge (STOCK) Act of 2012, a federal transparency and conflict-of-interest law, by disclosing up to 17 months late stock purchases made by one of his dependent children.

=== Committees ===
- Committee on Energy and Natural Resources
  - Subcommittee on Water and Power
- Committee on Agriculture, Nutrition, and Forestry
  - Subcommittee on Conservation, Climate, Forestry, and Natural Resources (chair)
  - Subcommittee on Livestock, Dairy, Poultry, Local Food Systems, and Food Safety and Security
  - Subcommittee on Food and Nutrition, Specialty Crops, Organics, and Research
- Committee on Health, Education, Labor and Pensions
  - Subcommittee on Employment and Workplace Safety
  - Subcommittee on Primary Health and Retirement Security (chair)
- Committee on Small Business and Entrepreneurship
- Committee on Finance

== Political positions ==
Marshall voted in line with President Trump's positions 98% of the time.

On January 6, 2021, Marshall was a leading advocate of Trump's efforts to overturn his election loss, and was one of the five senators who objected to both the certification of Arizona's and Pennsylvania's electoral votes.

=== 2021 attempt to overturn the 2020 presidential election results ===
Marshall disputed the results of the 2020 presidential election, claiming that in "several states" "governors, secretaries of states and activist courts" usurped legislatures to create voting rules. Therefore, he announced that he would oppose the January 6, 2021, certification of the Electoral College count. He would also call for an electoral commission to investigate "the integrity of the ballot, to hold states accountable to the time proven constitutional system of the Electoral College."

Marshall was participating in the certification of the Electoral College count when Trump supporters stormed the United States Capitol. He blamed "the rioters, vandals, and trespassers" for destroying "any chance we had for peaceful discussion and debate on restoring and ensuring confidence in this and all future elections." He also called for participants to be "prosecuted to the fullest extent."

After the Capitol was secure, Marshall joined the Senate to continue the vote on the certification. Marshall supported the objections to Arizona's and Pennsylvania's electoral votes. The Senate rejected these objections by 93–6 and 92-7 respectively. He called his decision to object to the count "from my heart." Following the vote on certification, Marshall acknowledged that Joe Biden would be president and urged a peaceful transition of power.

As a result of his refusal to certify the count, the Kansas Democratic Party called for his expulsion from Congress for failure to "execute [his] oath of office to support and defend the United States Constitution". The McPherson Sentinel editorial board wrote that Marshall "should be ashamed" of his decision to support false claims of voter fraud and trying to overturn the election.

On May 28, 2021, Marshall voted against creating an independent commission to investigate the 2021 United States Capitol attack.

=== Abortion ===
Marshall opposes abortion, including in cases of rape and incest. In 2020, he called for overturning Roe v. Wade, the U.S. Supreme Court decision that ruled abortion bans unconstitutional.

In 2022, shortly after the Supreme Court overturned Roe v. Wade in the Dobbs case, Marshall endorsed exceptions to abortion bans that would permit abortion to preserve the mother's life. During a Senate committee hearing, he said: "women with miscarriages and ectopic pregnancies will be treated in every state without exception. Life of the mom will continue to be honored."

Marshall has used his former occupation as an obstetrician/gynecologist as a credential in his expressions of opposition to abortion.

=== Agriculture ===
In 2023, Marshall introduced the Ending Agricultural Trade Suppression (EATS) Act, which sought to prohibit state and local governments from imposing production standards on agricultural goods sold in interstate commerce. The bill was introduced in response to California's Proposition 12, which established animal welfare requirements for pork, veal, and egg products sold in the state, regardless of origin. Marshall argued that such regulations impose burdens on producers and disrupt interstate commerce. Opponents of the EATS Act warned the legislation could undermine efforts to regulate food safety, animal welfare, public health, and environmental standards. The proposal became a key point of contention during negotiations over the 2023 United States farm bill, but it was ultimately not included in the farm bill extension.

In 2022, Marshall introduced legislation to required the Department of Agriculture to assess biostimulants as an "eligible conservation practice standard". In May 2025, Marshall introduced the Plant Biostimulant Act, which would establish statutory definitions of biostimulants and mandates the Department of Agriculture to produce a study on the benefits of biostimulants.

=== Cannabis ===
Of medical marijuana, Marshall said in 2017, "I'm not convinced that it's medically proven and a good idea... I think there's a path there, but I just haven't seen enough scientific data to say it's a good thing."

=== COVID-19 pandemic ===
Marshall has promoted conspiracy theories that falsely suggest that the Centers for Disease Control and Prevention were inflating coronavirus death numbers. Facebook removed Marshall's posts from its platform as a violation of its rule against "harmful misinformation". Marshall called Facebook's removal of his posts "corporate censorship".

Marshall does not dispute the effectiveness of masks in halting the spread of the coronavirus but he opposes face mask mandates. He has appeared at indoor campaign events without a face mask before maskless crowds who did not observe social distancing.

During the pandemic, Marshall promoted prophylactic use of hydroxychloroquine, an antimalarial drug Trump promoted, despite its being unproven as an effective treatment and despite government warnings about using it outside research or hospital settings. He said he himself used the drug to proactively guard against the virus.

=== Environment ===
Marshall rejects the scientific consensus on climate change, saying, "I'm not sure that there is even climate change." He has criticized the Environmental Protection Agency and supports reducing its authority. Marshall supports the federal renewable fuel standard, which requires corn-based ethanol to be blended with gasoline. He supported Trump's decision to withdraw the U.S. from the Paris climate accord.

=== Hate crimes ===
Marshall was one of six Republican senators to vote against expanding the COVID-19 Hate Crimes Act, which would allow the U.S. Justice Department to review hate crimes related to COVID-19 and establish an online database.

=== Health care ===
Marshall supports repealing the Affordable Care Act (aka "Obamacare"). He voted for the American Health Care Act of 2017, which would have repealed and replaced the ACA. In 2020, he continued to campaign on repealing and replacing the ACA.

Marshall opposes Medicaid expansion in Kansas. He says he "measures success in how many people can afford to leave the Medicaid program and enter the private insurance market." In explaining his opposition to Medicaid expansion, Marshall said in an interview in March 2017 that some people "just don't want health care." His remarks attracted criticism; Marshall said they were taken out of context and cited his work as a doctor at a free family planning clinic which he said was the only clinic in the area to accept Medicaid.

=== Economy ===
Marshall supports farm subsidies, such as federal crop insurance. His support for subsidies gained him the 2016 endorsement of the Kansas Farm Bureau in the Republican primary.

In December 2017, Marshall voted for the Tax Cuts and Jobs Act of 2017.

Marshall was among the 31 Senate Republicans who voted against final passage of the Fiscal Responsibility Act of 2023.

Marshall has supported the second Trump administration's tariffs policy.

=== Foreign policy ===
Citing the "America First" doctrine, Marshall generally favors isolationist, non-charitable foreign policy, but with exceptions for Israel.

While serving in the House, Marshall was among 60 Republicans to vote against condemning Trump's decision to withdraw troops from Syria.

In 2022, Marshall resisted moves to provide foreign aid to Ukraine In April 2024, he was one of only 18 U.S. senators (mostly Republicans) to vote against the long contested $95.3 billion in aid for Ukraine, Israel, and Taiwan—and legislation enabling a ban on TikTok. He attempted to persuade the Senate to provide aid to Israel alone, strongly opposing aid to Ukraine. He again opposed aid to Ukraine in early 2025. On all three occasions, he insisted that the spending priority in foreign affairs should instead be "border security".

When, in early 2025, President Donald Trump and his colleague Elon Musk began dismantling USAID (the principal U.S. foreign aid agency)—and the related 70-year-old, Kansas-originated, federal Food for Peace program, which feeds people in poor countries around the globe (largely with farm products purchased from Kansas)—Marshall encouraged their halt of foreign aid.

Alleging "significant fraud and abuse" in the program and complaining that America is "just taken for granted", Marshall said he had spoken to Musk (and Musk colleague Vivek Ramaswamy) about "problems in the USAID program" and complained that the U.S. is no longer "using it to our advantage".

In April 2026, Marshall voted against a war powers resolution intended to halt the 2026 Iran war until Congress authorized it. Of the economic impact of the war, he said, "I'm sorry the gas prices are going up, but help is on the way and your national security, yes, is even more important than your pocketbook."

=== Immigration ===
Marshall supported Trump's Executive Order 13769, which barred citizens of seven Muslim-majority nations from entering the United States. He supports an immigration bill with a pathway to citizenship for people not living in the U.S. legally.

== Personal life ==
Marshall lived in Great Bend, Kansas, where he practiced medicine as an obstetrician/gynecologist. He and his wife, Laina Marshall, have four children. Laina has had a real estate license in Florida.

Shortly after joining the Senate, Marshall sold his home in Great Bend and switched his legal residence to a ranch cabin in St. John, Kansas. Marshall also owns a vacation home in Sarasota, Florida, valued at $1.2 million, near where his children reside.

Marshall is a non-denominational Protestant.

== Electoral history ==
Kansas's 1st congressional district, 2016

Republican primary
Party	Candidate	Votes	%
Republican	Roger Marshall	58,808	56.5%
Republican	Tim Huelskamp (incumbent)	45,315	43.5%
Total		104,123	100%

General election
Party	Candidate	Votes	%
Republican	Roger Marshall	166,051	66.2%
Independent	Alan LaPolice	66,218	26.4%
Libertarian	Kerry Burt	18,415	7.4%
Total		250,684	100%

Kansas's 1st congressional district, 2018

Republican primary
Party	Candidate	Votes	%
Republican	Roger Marshall (incumbent)	64,843	78.7%
Republican	Nick Reinecker	17,593	21.3%
Total		82,436	100%

General election
Party	Candidate	Votes	%
Republican	Roger Marshall (incumbent)	153,082	68.1%
Democratic	Alan LaPolice	71,558	31.9%
Total		224,640	100%

Republican primary results, Kansas 2020
Party	Candidate	Votes	%
Republican	Roger Marshall	157,914	39.41%
Republican	Kris Kobach	102,903	25.68%
Republican	Bob Hamilton	73,492	18.34%
Republican	Dave Lindstrom	25,382	6.33%
Republican	Steve Roberts	14,601	3.64%
Republican	Brian Matlock	6,385	1.59%
Republican	Lance Berland	6,118	1.53%
Republican	John Miller	4,107	1.02%
Republican	Derek Ellis	3,932	0.98%
Republican	Gabriel Robles	3,578	0.89%
Republican	John Berman	2,302	0.57%
Total votes		400,714	100.0%

United States Senate election in Kansas, 2020
Party	Candidate	Votes	%	±%
Republican	Roger Marshall	727,962	53.22%	+0.07%
Democratic	Barbara Bollier	571,530	41.79%	N/A
Libertarian	Jason Buckley	68,263	4.99%	+0.67%
Total votes		1,367,755	100.0%	
Republican hold				

== See also ==
- Physicians in the United States Congress

U.S. House of Representatives
Preceded by Tim Huelskamp	Member of the US House of Representatives from Kansas's 1st congressional district 2017–2021	Succeeded by Tracey Mann
Party political offices
Preceded by Pat Roberts	Republican nominee for U.S. Senator from Kansas (Class 2); 2020, 2026	Most recent
U.S. Senate
Preceded by Pat Roberts	U.S. Senator (Class 2) from Kansas; 2021–present Served alongside: Jerry Moran	Incumbent
U.S. order of precedence (ceremonial)
Preceded by Tommy Tuberville	Order of precedence of the United States as United States Senator	Succeeded by John Hickenlooper
Preceded by Cynthia Lummis	United States senators by seniority 72nd	Succeeded by John Hickenlooper
