= 1948 United States Senate election in Kansas =

- November 2, 1948
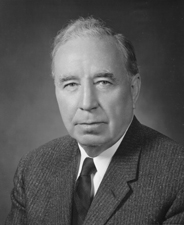

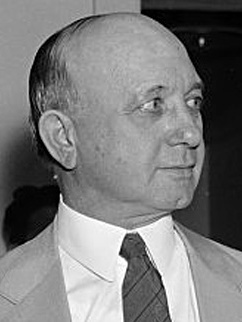
Nominee	Andrew F. Schoeppel	George McGill
Party	Republican	Democratic
Popular vote	393,412	305,987
Percentage	54.92%	42.72%
- County results Schoeppel: 40–50% 50–60% 60–70% 70–80% McGill: 40–50% 50–60%
U.S. senator before election
Arthur Capper
Republican
Elected U.S. Senator
Andrew F. Schoeppel
Republican

The 1948 United States Senate election in Kansas was held on Tuesday November 2, to elect a United States Senator to class 2 United States Senate seat to represent of the State of Kansas for 6-year term. beginning January 3, 1949 ending January 3, 1955, Incumbent Republican Senator Arthur Capper declined to run for re-election to a sixth term. Former Governor Andrew F. Schoeppel won the Republican primary in a landslide and faced former U.S. Senator George McGill, the Democratic nominee. Schoeppel defeated Capper by a wide margin, outperforming Republican presidential nominee Thomas E. Dewey, who defeated President Harry S. Truman in the state.

== Democratic primary ==
=== Candidates ===
- George McGill, former U.S. Senator
- E. K. Dean, former President of the Kansas Farmers Union

=== Results ===
Democratic primary results
Party	Candidate	Votes	%
Democratic	George McGill	46,597	69.65%
Democratic	E. K. Dean	20,301	30.35%
Total votes		66,898	100.00%

== Republican primary ==
=== Candidates ===
- Andrew F. Schoeppel, former Governor of Kansas
- Harold H. Malone, Sedgwick County Attorney

=== Results ===
Republican primary results
Party	Candidate	Votes	%
Republican	Andrew F. Schoeppel	159,359	76.95%
Republican	Harold H. Malone	47,748	23.05%
Total votes		207,107	100.00%

== Prohibition primary ==
=== Candidates ===
- C. Floyd Hester, former President of Miltonvale Wesleyan College, 1942 Prohibition Party nominee for the U.S. Senate

=== Results ===
Prohibition primary results
Party	Candidate	Votes	%
Prohibition	C. Floyd Hester	573	100.00%
Total votes		573	100.00%

== General election ==
=== Results ===
1948 United States Senate election in Kansas
Party	Candidate	Votes	%	±%
Republican	Andrew F. Schoeppel	393,412	54.92%	−2.19%
Democratic	George McGill	305,987	42.72%	+2.41%
Prohibition	C. Floyd Hester	16,943	2.37%	−0.22%
Majority		87,425	12.20%	−4.61%
Total votes		716,342	100.00%	
Republican hold				

== See also ==
- 1948 United States Senate elections
