= 1932 United States Senate election in Kansas =

- November 8, 1932
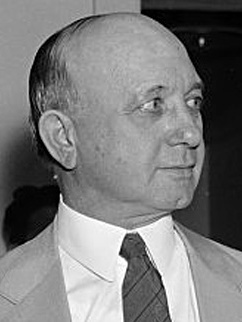

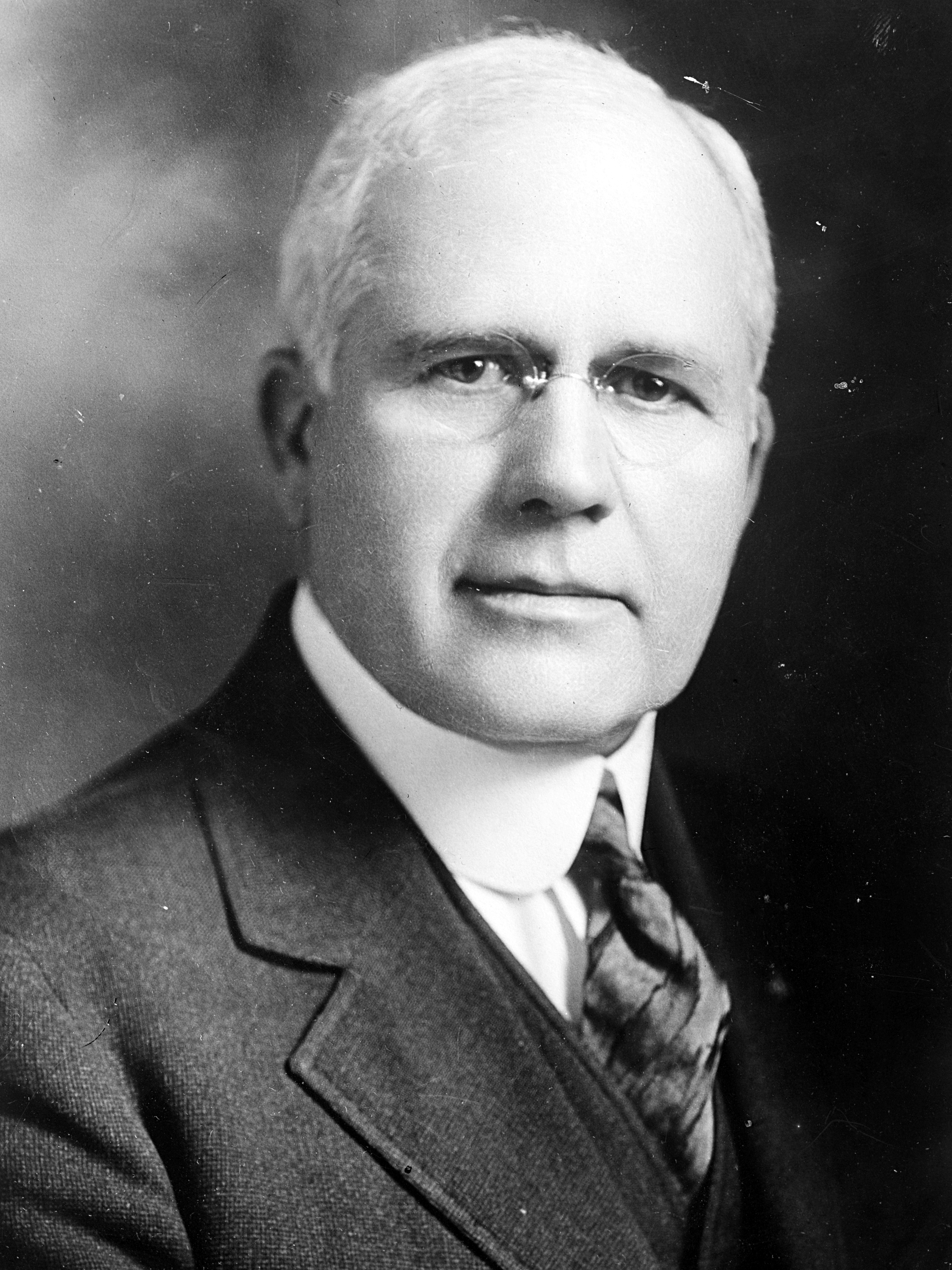

Nominee	George McGill	Benjamin S. Paulen	George A. Brown
Party	Democratic	Republican	Independent
Popular vote	328,992	302,809	65,583
Percentage	45.67%	42.03%	9.10%
- County results McGill: 30–40% 40–50% 50–60% 60–70% Paulsen: 40–50% 50–60%
U.S. senator before election
George McGill
Democratic
Elected U.S. Senator
George McGill
Democratic

The 1932 United States Senate election in Kansas was held on November 8, 1932. Incumbent Democratic Senator George McGill, who was first elected in a 1930 special election, ran for re-election to his first full term. McGill defeated former U.S. Representative Chauncey B. Little in the Democratic primary and faced former Governor Benjamin S. Paulen, the Republican nominee, in the general election, along with independent candidates George Alfred Brown and J. F. William Renker and Socialist nominee E. Haldeman-Julius. McGill ultimately won re-election, winning 46% of the vote to Paulen's 42% and Brown's 9%. This was the last Democratic victory in a U.S. Senate election in Kansas until 2026, which was the longest continuous single-party winning streak in the Senate since the Seventeenth Amendment implemented the direct election of senators in 1913.

== Democratic primary ==
=== Candidates ===
- George McGill, incumbent U.S. Senator
- Chauncey B. Little, former U.S. Representative from Kansas's 2nd congressional district

=== Results ===
Democratic primary results
Party	Candidate	Votes	%
Democratic	George McGill (inc.)	92,474	67.46%
Democratic	Chauncey B. Little	44,613	32.54%
Total votes		137,087	100.00%

== Republican primary ==
=== Candidates ===
- Benjamin S. Paulen, former Governor of Kansas
- Joe H. Mercer, State Livestock Commissioner
- C. C. Isely, Dodge City lumber and grain dealer
- James F. Getty, former State Senator, 1930 Republican candidate for the U.S. Senate
- Tom Harley, Wichita attorney
- E. P. Fuller, Iola real estate agent
- D. E. Dunne, former Comanche County Clerk

=== Results ===
Republican primary results
Party	Candidate	Votes	%
Republican	Benjamin S. Paulen	103,808	36.42%
Republican	Joe H. Mercer	61,912	21.72%
Republican	C. C. Isely	46,635	16.36%
Republican	James F. Getty	34,872	12.24%
Republican	Tom Harley	17,731	6.22%
Republican	E. P. Fuller	10,318	3.62%
Republican	D. E. Dunne	9,734	3.42%
Total votes		285,010	100.00%

== Socialist primary ==
=== Candidates ===
- E. Haldeman-Julius, writer and publisher

=== Results ===
Socialist primary results
Party	Candidate	Votes	%
Socialist	E. Haldeman-Julius	189	100.00%
Total votes		189	100.00%

== General election ==
=== Results ===
1932 United States Senate election in Kansas
Party	Candidate	Votes	%	±%
Democratic	George McGill (inc.)	328,992	45.67%	−4.37%
Republican	Benjamin S. Paulen	302,809	42.03%	−5.91%
Independent	George Alfred Brown	65,583	9.10%	—
Independent	J. F. William Renker	14,550	2.02%	—
Socialist	E. Haldeman-Julius	8,474	1.18%	−0.84%
Majority		26,183	3.63%	+1.55%
Total votes		720,408	100.00%	
Democratic hold				

== See also ==
- 1932 United States Senate elections
