= 1938 United States Senate election in Kansas =

- November 8, 1938
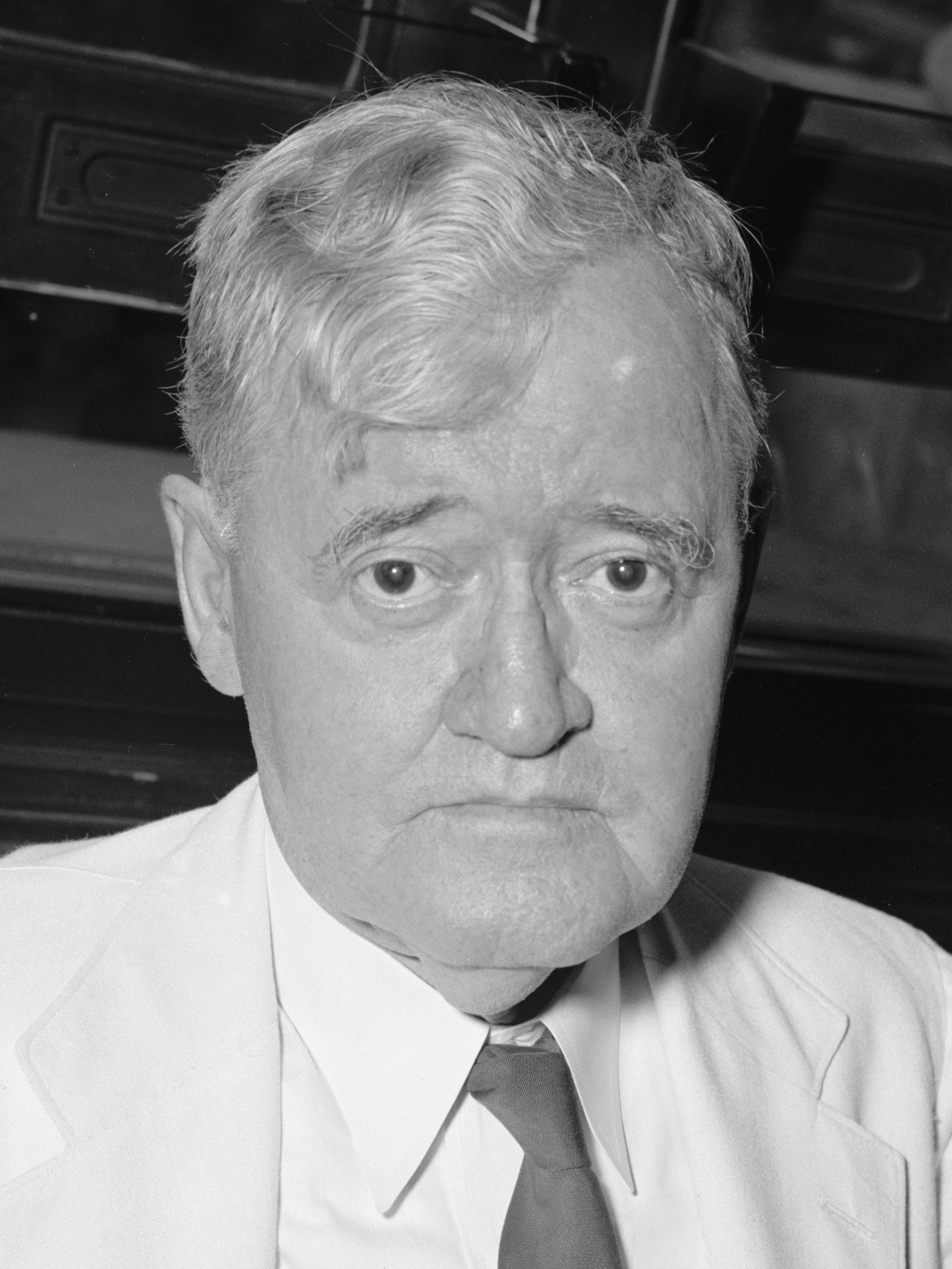

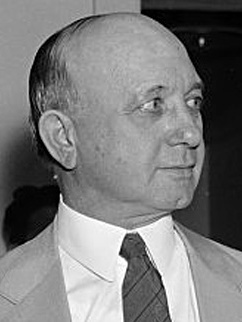
Nominee	Clyde M. Reed	George McGill
Party	Republican	Democratic
Popular vote	419,532	326,774
Percentage	56.21%	43.78%
- County results Reed: 50–60% 60–70% McGill: 50–60%
U.S. senator before election
George McGill
Democratic
Elected U.S. Senator
Clyde M. Reed
Republican

The 1938 United States Senate election in Kansas was held on November 8, 1938. Incumbent Democratic Senator George McGill ran for re-election to his second full term. Former Governor Clyde M. Reed won the Republican nomination to face McGill in a crowded field and ended up defeating him in a landslide, winning 56% of the vote in a year of nationwide Republican gains.

== Democratic primary ==
=== Candidates ===
- George McGill, incumbent U.S. Senator
- Joe Dohner, Peabody farmer

=== Results ===
Democratic primary results
Party	Candidate	Votes	%
Democratic	George McGill	117,500	85.73%
Democratic	Joe Dohner	19,554	14.27%
Total votes		137,054	100.00%

== Republican primary ==
=== Candidates ===
- Clyde M. Reed, former Governor of Kansas
- Dallas W. Knapp, former State Senator
- Gerald B. Winrod, evangelist and Christian Identity promoter
- Jesse Clyde Fisher, Methodist minister and former Augusta City Councilman

=== Results ===
Republican primary results
Party	Candidate	Votes	%
Republican	Clyde M. Reed	104,918	42.28%
Republican	Dallas W. Knapp	64,068	25.82%
Republican	Gerald B. Winrod	53,149	21.42%
Republican	Jesse Clyde Fisher	26,034	10.49%
Total votes		248,169	100.00%

== General election ==
=== Results ===
1938 United States Senate election in Kansas
Party	Candidate	Votes	%	±%
Republican	Clyde M. Reed	419,532	56.21%	+14.17%
Democratic	George McGill (inc.)	326,774	43.78%	−1.89%
Write-in	Joe Corpstein	99	0.01%	—
Majority		92,758	12.43%	+8.79%
Total votes		746,405	100.00%	
Republican gain from Democratic				

== See also ==
- 1938 United States Senate elections
