= 1986 United States Senate election in Kansas =

- November 4, 1986
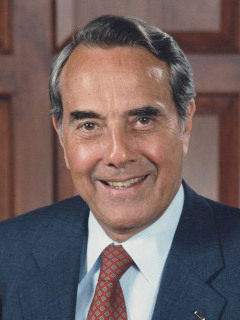

Nominee	Bob Dole	Guy MacDonald
Party	Republican	Democratic
Popular vote	576,902	246,664
Percentage	70.05%	29.95%
- County results Dole: 50–60% 60–70% 70–80%
U.S. senator before election
Bob Dole
Republican
Elected U.S. Senator
Bob Dole
Republican

The 1986 United States Senate election in Kansas was held on November 4, 1986. Incumbent Republican Bob Dole defeated Democratic nominee Guy MacDonald with 70.05% of the vote.

== Primary elections ==
Primary elections were held on August 5, 1986.

=== Democratic primary ===
==== Candidates ====
- Guy MacDonald, school teacher
- Darrell Ringer
- W.H. Addington
- Lionel Kunst
- Jim Oyler

==== Results ====
Democratic primary results
Party	Candidate	Votes	%
Democratic	Guy MacDonald	31,942	27.66
Democratic	Darrell Ringer	30,483	26.39
Democratic	W.H. Addington	21,082	18.25
Democratic	Lionel Kunst	18,795	16.27
Democratic	Jim Oyler	13,201	11.43
Total votes		115,503	100.00

=== Republican primary ===
==== Candidates ====
- Bob Dole, incumbent United States Senator
- Shirley J.A. Landis

==== Results ====
Republican primary results
Party	Candidate	Votes	%
Republican	Bob Dole (incumbent)	228,301	84.39
Republican	Shirley J.A. Landis	42,237	15.61
Total votes		270,538	100.00

== General election ==
=== Candidates ===
- Bob Dole, Republican
- Guy MacDonald, Democratic

=== Results ===
1986 United States Senate election in Kansas
Party	Candidate	Votes	%	±%
Republican	Bob Dole (incumbent)	576,902	70.05%	
Democratic	Guy MacDonald	246,664	29.95%	
Majority		330,238	40.10%	
Turnout		823,566		
Republican hold		Swing		

== See also ==
- 1986 United States Senate elections
