= 1930 United States Senate special election in Kansas =

- November 4, 1930
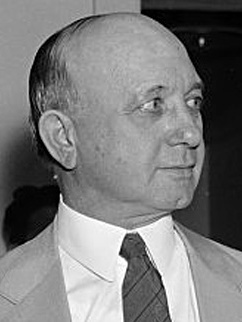

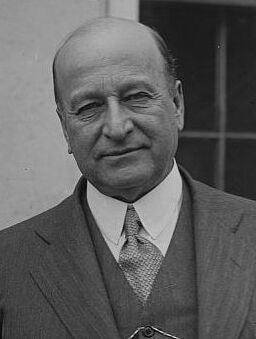
| Nominee | George McGill | Henry J. Allen |
| Party | Democratic | Republican |
| Popular vote | 288,889 | 276,833 |
| Percentage | 50.03% | 47.95% |
- County results McGill: 40–50% 50–60% 60–70% Allen: 40–50% 50–60% 60–70%
U.S. senator before election
Henry Justin Allen
Republican
Elected U.S. Senator
George McGill
Democratic

The 1930 United States Senate special election in Kansas was held on November 4, 1930. After Republican Senator Charles Curtis was re-elected in 1926, he was elected Vice President on a ticket with Herbert Hoover in 1928 and resigned his seat in the Senate. Governor Clyde M. Reed, a Republican, appointed former Governor Henry J. Allen to the seat. At the ensuing special election, Allen won a contested Republican primary and then faced former Sedgwick County Attorney George McGill, the Democratic nominee, in the general election. In a nationwide Democratic landslide, McGill narrowly defeated Allen. Until 2026, this was the last U.S. Senate election in Kansas in which the Democratic candidate won more than 50% of the vote.

== Democratic primary ==
=== Candidates ===
- George McGill, former Sedgwick County Attorney, 1926 Democratic candidate for Senate
- Charles Stephens, Columbus attorney, 1926 Democratic nominee for Senate

=== Results ===
Democratic primary results
| Party | Candidate | Votes | % |
|---|---|---|---|
| Democratic | George McGill | 32,931 | 58.94% |
| Democratic | Charles Stephens | 22,942 | 41.06% |
| Total votes | | 55,873 | 100.00% |

== Republican primary ==
=== Candidates ===
- Henry J. Allen, incumbent U.S. Senator
- Ralph Snyder, President of the Kansas Farm Bureau
- William H. Sproul, U.S. Representative from Kansas's 3rd congressional district
- James F. Getty, State Senator

=== Results ===
Republican primary results
| Party | Candidate | Votes | % |
|---|---|---|---|
| Republican | Henry J. Allen (inc.) | 122,651 | 45.70% |
| Republican | Ralph Snyder | 60,904 | 22.69% |
| Republican | William H. Sproul | 44,750 | 16.67% |
| Republican | James F. Getty | 40,070 | 14.93% |
| Total votes | | 268,375 | 100.00% |

== Socialist primary ==
=== Candidates ===
- H. M. Perkins, Kansas City attorney

=== Results ===
Socialist primary results
| Party | Candidate | Votes | % |
|---|---|---|---|
| Socialist | H. M. Perkins | 102 | 100.00% |
| Total votes | | 102 | 100.00% |

== General election ==
=== Results ===
1930 United States Senate special election in Kansas
| Party | Candidate | Votes | % | ±% |
|---|---|---|---|---|
| Democratic | George McGill | 288,889 | 50.03% | +15.29% |
| Republican | Henry J. Allen (inc.) | 276,833 | 47.95% | −15.62% |
| Socialist | H. M. Perkins | 11,659 | 2.02% | +0.33% |
| Majority | | 12,056 | 2.09% | +26.74% |
| Total votes | | 577,381 | 100.00% | |
| Democratic gain from Republican | | | | |

== See also ==
- 1930 United States Senate elections
