= United Methodist Church of the Resurrection =

United Methodist megachurch in the Kansas City Metropolitan Area (established in 1990)

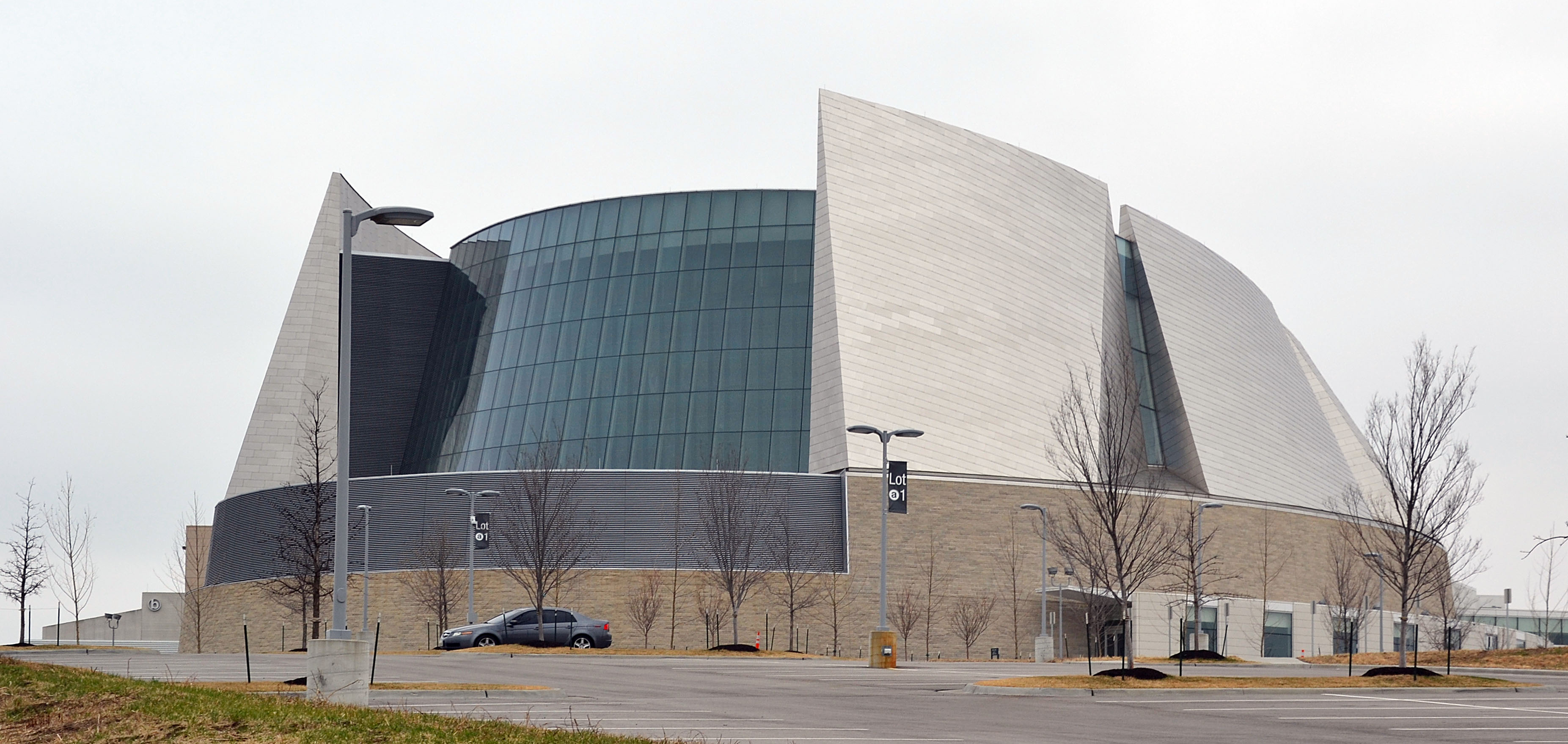
- United Methodist Church of the Resurrection
- 38°52′50″N 94°38′29″W
- Location: Leawood, KS
- Country: United States
- Denomination: United Methodist Church
- Website: resurrection.church

History
- Founded: 1990
- Founder: Adam Hamilton
- Dedication: Resurrection of Jesus

Resurrection, A United Methodist Church, also known as The United Methodist Church of the Resurrection or simply Church of the Resurrection, is the largest United Methodist congregation in the United States. A multi-site United Methodist Church based in the Kansas City metropolitan area, the main campus is located in Leawood, Kansas. In 2025, weekly attendance was 9,600 across 6 campuses.

The United Methodist Saint Paul School of Theology moved its facilities from Kansas City, Missouri, to the Church of the Resurrection in fall of 2013. The Church of the Resurrection’s senior pastor is Reverend and U.S. Senator-elect Adam Hamilton; he started the congregation in 1990. The church is committed to the renewal of mainline Protestantism and the United Methodist Church.

== History ==
In 1990, Church of the Resurrection started as a small church with a goal to welcome those not actively involved in a church. Resurrection met for its first worship service in McGilley Funeral Home, with approximately 10 people in attendance. By 1992, attendance grew and the church began meeting at Leawood Elementary School. They moved into their first permanent sanctuary in the fall of 1994, which is now the Wesley Covenant Chapel. As growth continued, the church constructed a larger sanctuary in 1998 that currently serves as the student center. The continued growth made way for a 3,050-seat sanctuary, an educational wing and prayer chapel in 2004. Live web streaming of worship services began in late 2008 for those unable to worship at a physical location. Since the launch of live streaming, groups around the city and country gather to watch the services online. In 2017, the church opened a new sanctuary which seats 3,500 and includes a large stained glass window called The Resurrection Window. The Resurrection Window was designed by Judson Studios to tell the biblical story, capturing themes of scripture including creation, sin, redemption, and restoration.

In 2025, weekly attendance was 9,600 across 6 campuses.

== Image gallery ==
United Methodist Church of the Resurrection (interior 1).JPG

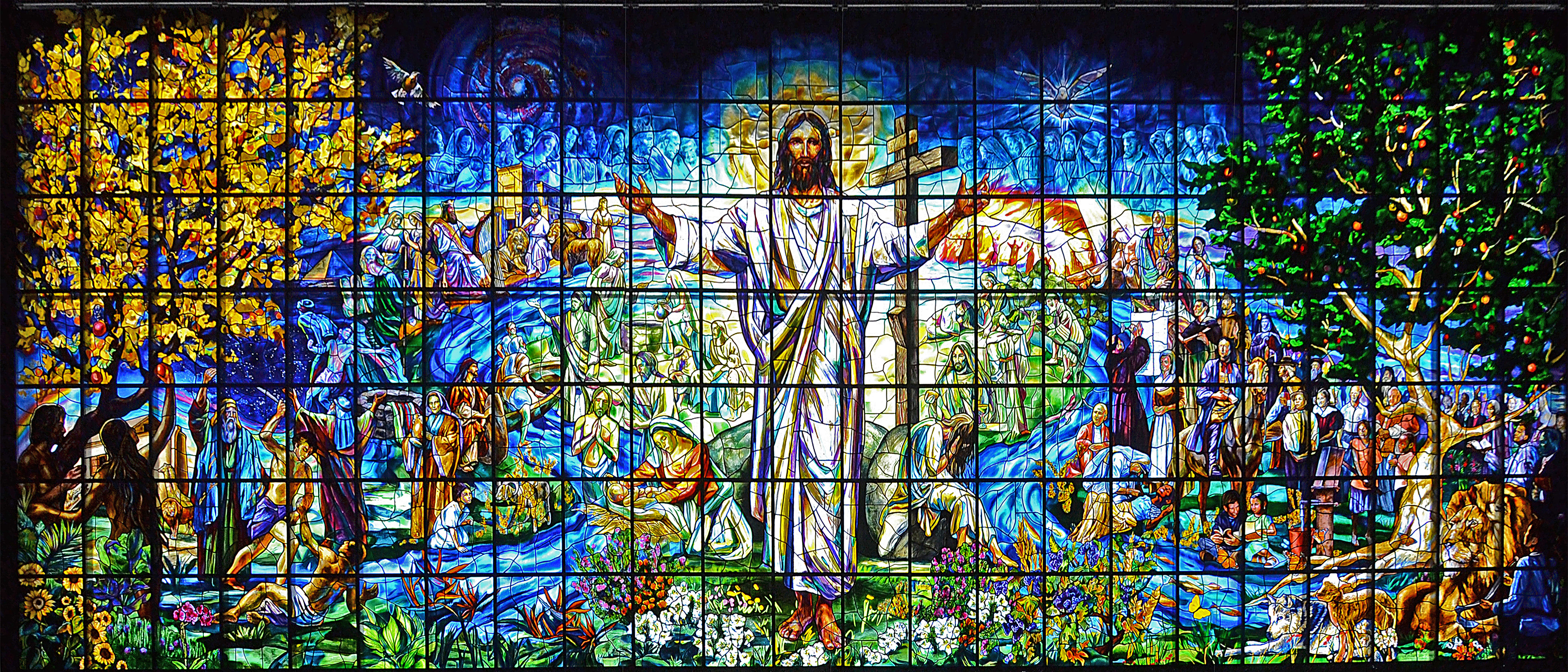
Judson Studios monumental work - A Story of Three Gardens

Wesley Covenant Chapel
