= George McGill (Kansas politician) =

American politician (1879–1963)

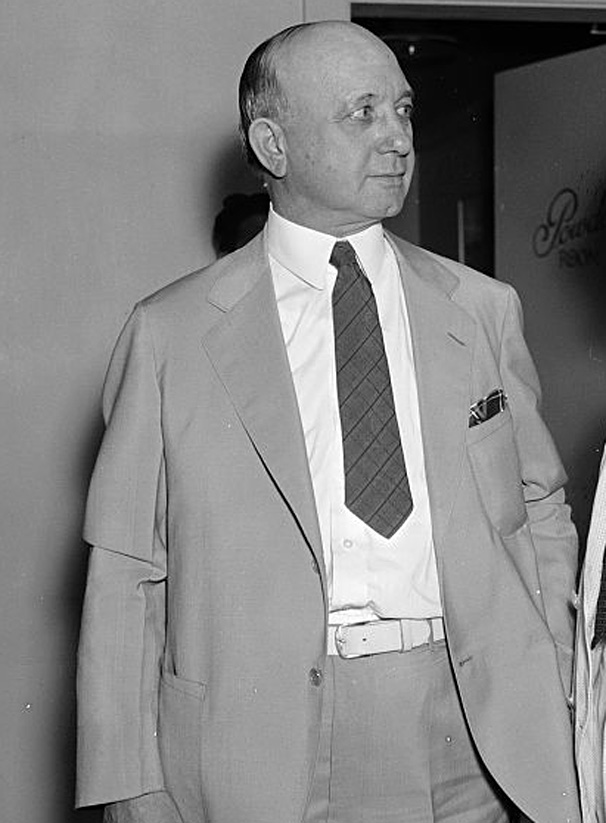
- McGill in 1937

United States Senator from Kansas
- In office December 1, 1930 – January 3, 1939
- Preceded by: Henry J. Allen
- Succeeded by: Clyde M. Reed

Personal details
- Born: February 12, 1879 Russell, Iowa, U.S.
- Died: May 14, 1963 (aged 84) Wichita, Kansas, U.S.
- Party: Democratic

George S. McGill (February 12, 1879 – May 14, 1963) was an American politician who served as a United States senator from Kansas from 1930 to 1939. He was the last Democrat elected to the Senate from Kansas until Adam Hamilton was elected in 2026.

== Biography ==
Born in Lucas County, Iowa, he moved with his parents to Kansas when he was five. He graduated from Central Normal College in Great Bend, Kansas, at the turn of the century and was admitted to the state bar two years later. McGill then moved to Wichita, Kansas, where he was made deputy county attorney and then county attorney for Sedgwick County, Kansas. He was elected to the United States Senate on November 4, 1930, to replace Charles Curtis, who resigned to become vice president of the United States. Former governor Henry J. Allen was appointed to fill the seat until a successor was elected.

In the Senate, he was the chairman of the Committee on Pensions and was particularly involved in the Agricultural Adjustment Act. In 1937, he was considered for a judicial appointment for a seat in United States Court of Appeals for the Tenth Circuit, but declined, opting to seek re-election in 1938.

He was re-elected to a full term in 1932 but decisively lost a reelection bid in 1938 and three more elections in 1942, 1948 and 1954. McGill was appointed by President Franklin D. Roosevelt as a member of the U.S. Tariff Commission, a post he held until 1954. He died in St. Francis Hospital in Wichita in 1963 and was buried in Pawnee Rock Cemetery, in Pawnee Rock, Kansas.

Kansas has elected only four Democratic U.S. senators; McGill is one of two of the four both to be elected by popular vote (as opposed to election by the state legislature) and to serve more than one six-year term, the others being John Martin, William Thompson and Adam Hamilton. McGill was the last Democrat to serve in the U.S. Senate from Kansas until Adam Hamilton was elected in 2026.

== Sources ==
- United States Congress. "George McGill (id: M000447)". Biographical Directory of the United States Congress.
- House Transcript
- Kansas: A Cyclopedia Bio
- "Kansas' McGill", Time. September 12, 1938.

Party political offices
Preceded by Charles Stephens	Democratic nominee for U.S. Senator from Kansas (Class 3); 1930, 1932, 1938	Succeeded by Thurman Hill
Preceded by Omar B. Ketchum	Democratic nominee for U.S. Senator from Kansas (Class 2); 1942, 1948, 1954	Succeeded by Frank Gordon Theis
U.S. Senate
Preceded by Henry Justin Allen	United States Senator (Class 3) from Kansas; 1930-1939; Served alongside: Arthur Capper	Succeeded by Clyde M. Reed
