= 2004 United States Senate election in Kansas =

- November 2, 2004
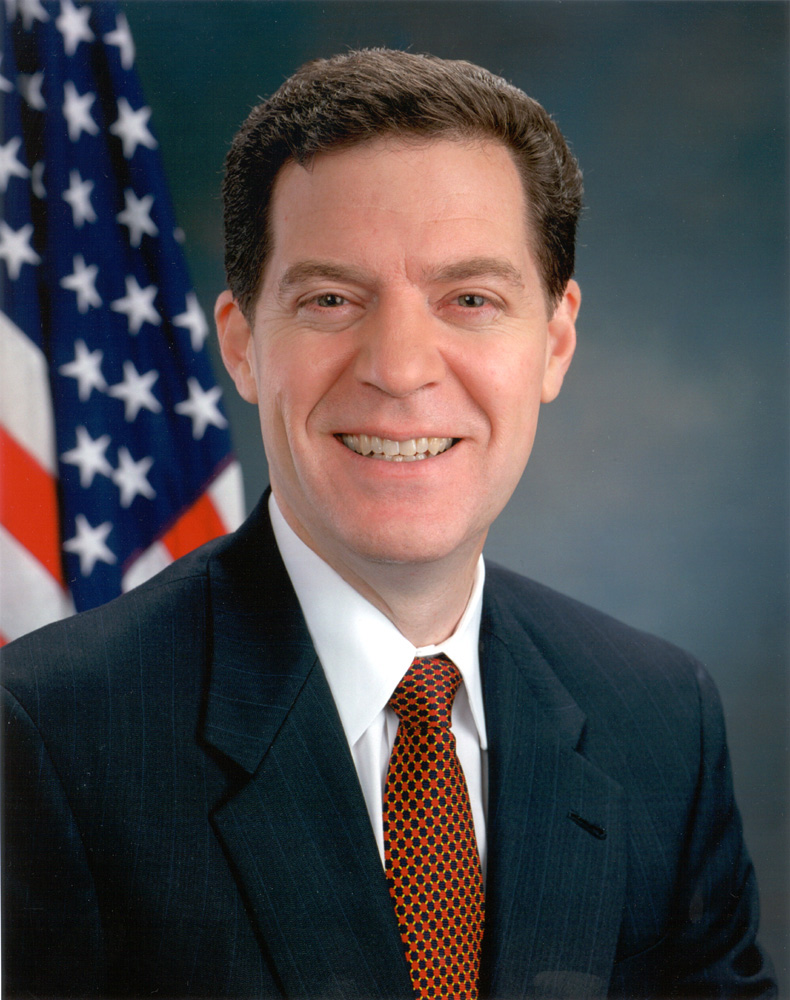

Nominee	Sam Brownback	Lee Jones
Party	Republican	Democratic
Popular vote	780,863	310,337
Percentage	69.16%	27.49%
- County results Brownback: 50–60% 60–70% 70–80% 80–90% >90% Jones: 50–60%
U.S. senator before election
Sam Brownback
Republican
Elected U.S. Senator
Sam Brownback
Republican

The 2004 United States Senate election in Kansas was held November 2, 2004. Incumbent Republican U.S. Senator Sam Brownback won re-election to a third term.

== Democratic primary ==
=== Candidates ===
- Robert Conroy
- Lee Jones, railroad engineer

=== Results ===
Democratic primary results
Party	Candidate	Votes	%
Democratic	Robert A. Conroy	61,052	55.92%
Democratic	Lee Jones	48,133	44.08%
Total votes		109,185	100.00%

Though Robert Conroy won the Democratic nomination, he dropped out of the race shortly after becoming the nominee, noting that he expected Jones to win and was tired of campaigning. The Kansas Democratic Party selected Lee Jones as the replacement candidate.

== Republican primary ==
=== Candidates ===
- Sam Brownback, incumbent U.S. Senator
- Arch Naramore, businessman

=== Results ===
Republican primary results
Party	Candidate	Votes	%
Republican	Sam Brownback (Incumbent)	286,839	86.99%
Republican	Arch Naramore	42,880	13.01%
Total votes		329,719	100.00%

== General election ==
=== Candidates ===
- Sam Brownback (R), incumbent U.S. Senator
- George Cook (Re)
- Lee Jones (D), railroad engineer
- Steven Rosile (L)

=== Campaign ===
Brownback raised $2.5 million for his re-election campaign, while Jones raised only $90,000. Kansas last elected a Democratic senator in 1932. Brownback was very popular in the state.

=== Predictions ===
Source	Ranking	As of
Sabato's Crystal Ball	Safe R	November 1, 2004

=== Results ===
General election results
Party	Candidate	Votes	%	±%
Republican	Sam Brownback (Incumbent)	780,863	69.16%	+3.90%
Democratic	Lee Jones	310,337	27.49%	−4.10%
Libertarian	Steven A. Rosile	21,842	1.93%	+0.35%
Reform	George Cook	15,980	1.42%	−0.14%
Majority		470,526	41.68%	+8.00%
Turnout		1,129,022		
Republican hold		Swing		

== See also ==
- 2004 United States Senate elections
