= 1942 United States Senate election in Kansas =

- November 3, 1942
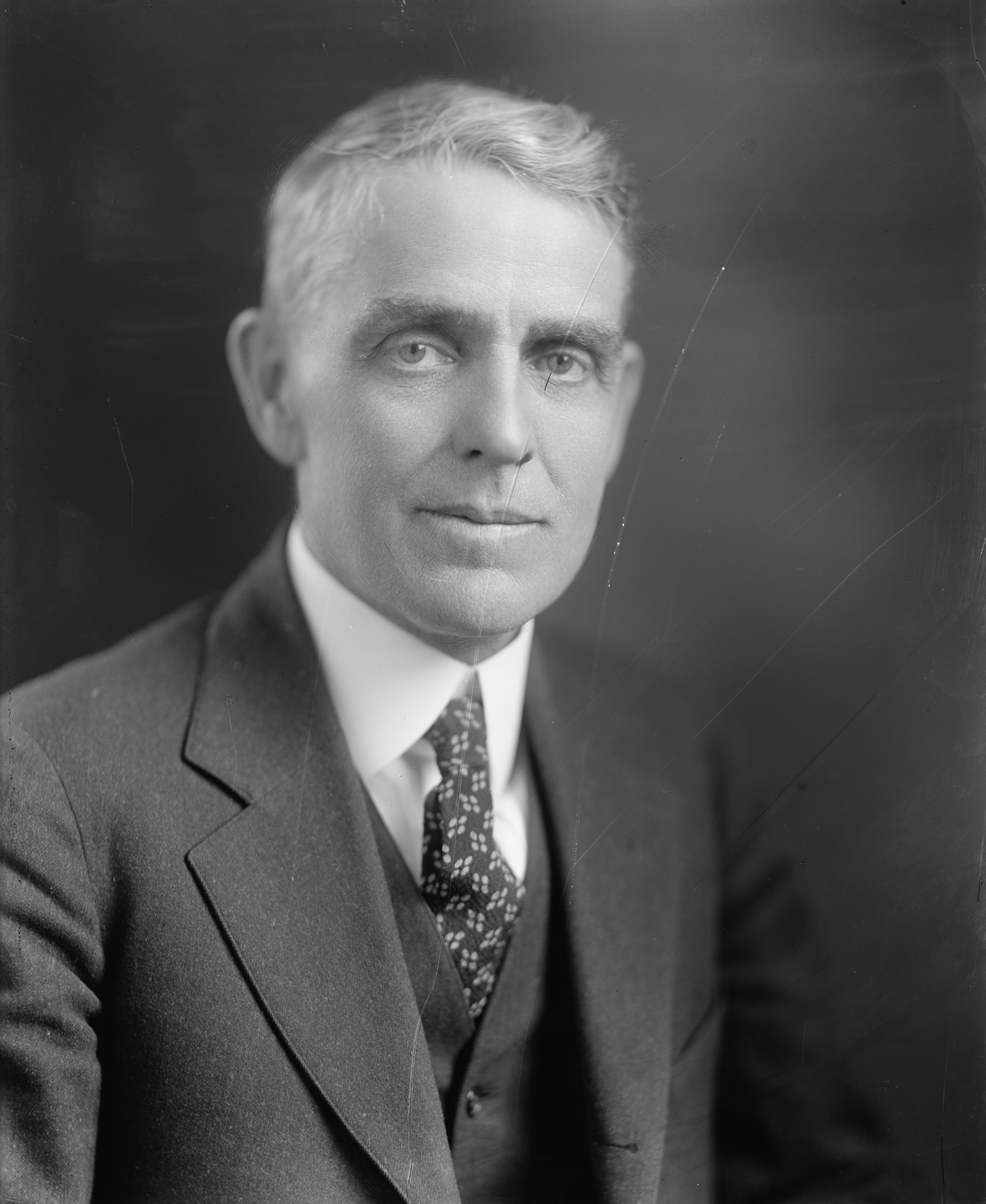

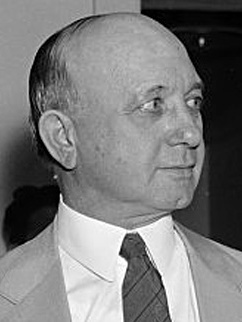
Nominee	Arthur Capper	George McGill
Party	Republican	Democratic
Popular vote	284,059	200,437
Percentage	57.11%	40.30%
- County results Capper: 40–50% 50–60% 60–70% McGill: 40–50% 50–60%
U.S. senator before election
Arthur Capper
Republican
Elected U.S. Senator
Arthur Capper
Republican

The 1942 United States Senate election in Kansas took place on November 3, 1942. Incumbent Republican Senator Arthur Capper ran for re-election to a fifth and final term. He won renomination in the Republican primary and faced former Senator George McGill, the Democratic nominee, in the general election. Capper defeated McGill in a landslide, as Republicans performed well nationwide.

== Democratic primary ==
=== Candidates ===
- George McGill, former U.S. Senator
- Randolph Carpenter, former U.S. Representative from Kansas's 4th congressional district
- W. G. Clugston, newspaperman and political analyst
- Loren Alton Moore, Mont Ida teacher

=== Results ===
Democratic primary results
Party	Candidate	Votes	%
Democratic	George McGill	43,193	60.25%
Democratic	Randolph Carpenter	19,986	27.88%
Democratic	W. G. Clugston	6,174	8.61%
Democratic	Loren Alton Moore	2,342	3.27%
Total votes		71,695	100.00%

== Republican primary ==
=== Candidates ===
- Arthur Capper, incumbent U.S. Senator
- John Allison, McPherson businessman
- C. C. Isely, Dodge City grain dealer

=== Results ===
Republican primary results
Party	Candidate	Votes	%
Republican	Arthur Capper (inc.)	103,221	59.54%
Republican	John Allison	49,703	28.67%
Republican	C. C. Isely	20,430	11.79%
Total votes		173,354	100.00%

== Prohibition primary ==
=== Candidates ===
- C. Floyd Hester, President of Miltonvale Wesleyan College

=== Results ===
Prohibition primary results
Party	Candidate	Votes	%
Prohibition	C. Floyd Hester	156	100.00%
Total votes		156	100.00%

== General election ==
=== Results ===
1942 United States Senate election in Kansas
Party	Candidate	Votes	%	±%
Republican	Arthur Capper (inc.)	284,059	57.11%	+6.11%
Democratic	George McGill	200,437	40.30%	−8.11%
Prohibition	C. Floyd Hester	12,863	2.59%	—
Majority		83,622	16.81%	+14.23%
Total votes		497,359	100.00%	
Republican hold				

== See also ==
- 1942 United States Senate elections
