= 2022 United States state legislative elections =

- November 8, 2022

88 legislative chambers 46 states
	Majority party	Minority party	Third party
Party	Republican	Democratic	Coalition
Chambers before	62	36	1 (Note: The Alaska House of Representatives prior to the 2022 elections was controlled by a coalition of 15 Democrats, 2 Republicans, and 4 Independents.)
Chambers after	57	40	2 (Note: The Alaska House of Representatives following the 2022 elections is controlled by a coalition of 19 Republicans, 2 Democrats, and 2 Independents.) (Note: The Alaska Senate prior to the 2022 elections was controlled by 13 Republicans and 1 Democrat who caucused with them. The Alaska Senate following the 2022 elections is controlled by a grand coalition of 9 Democrats and 8 Republicans.)
Overall change	▼5	▲4	▲1
- Map of upper house elections: Democrats gained control Democrats retained control Republicans retained control Coalition gained control Non-partisan legislature No regularly-scheduled elections

- Map of lower house elections: Democrats gained control Democrats retained control Republicans retained control Coalition retained control Non-partisan legislature No regularly-scheduled elections

The 2022 United States state legislative elections were held on November 8, 2022, for 88 state legislative chambers in 46 states. Across the fifty states, approximately 56 percent of all upper house seats and 92 percent of all lower house seats were up for election. Additionally, six territorial chambers were up in four territories and the District of Columbia. These midterm elections coincided with other state and local elections, including gubernatorial elections in multiple states.

Prior to the elections, Democrats held 14 trifectas (control of the governor's office and legislative chambers), Republicans held 23 trifectas, and 13 states held a divided government. These were the first elections affected by the 2020 redistricting cycle, which reapportioned state legislatures based on data from the 2020 United States census.

Democrats made unexpected gains in state legislatures across the country, flipping four chambers. This was the first midterm election since 1934 in which the party of the incumbent president did not lose any state legislative chambers to the opposition.

== Background ==
Partisan control of state legislatures following the 2020 and 2021 elections Republican control (29) Democratic control (17) Split control (3) Nonpartisan legislature (1)

Despite Democrat Joe Biden's victory in the 2020 presidential election, Republicans expanded their firm hold on state legislatures across the country in the concurrent legislative elections. With control of decennial redistricting on the line, Democrats had spent heavily in hopes of reversing the advantages Republicans held during the 2010s, but they instead gained control of no new chambers and lose control of both chambers of the New Hampshire General Court. Democrats position weakened further in the 2021 elections, where they lost control of the Virginia House of Delegates and several seats in the New Jersey Legislature.

Entering the 2022 elections, Republicans held government trifectas in 23 states to the Democrats' 14, with 13 states having divided governments. Democrats held no chambers in states won by Donald Trump in the 2020 election, although the Alaska House of Representatives was controlled by a Democratic-led coalition. Conversely, Republicans controlled 14 chambers in states won by Joe Biden.

== Issues ==
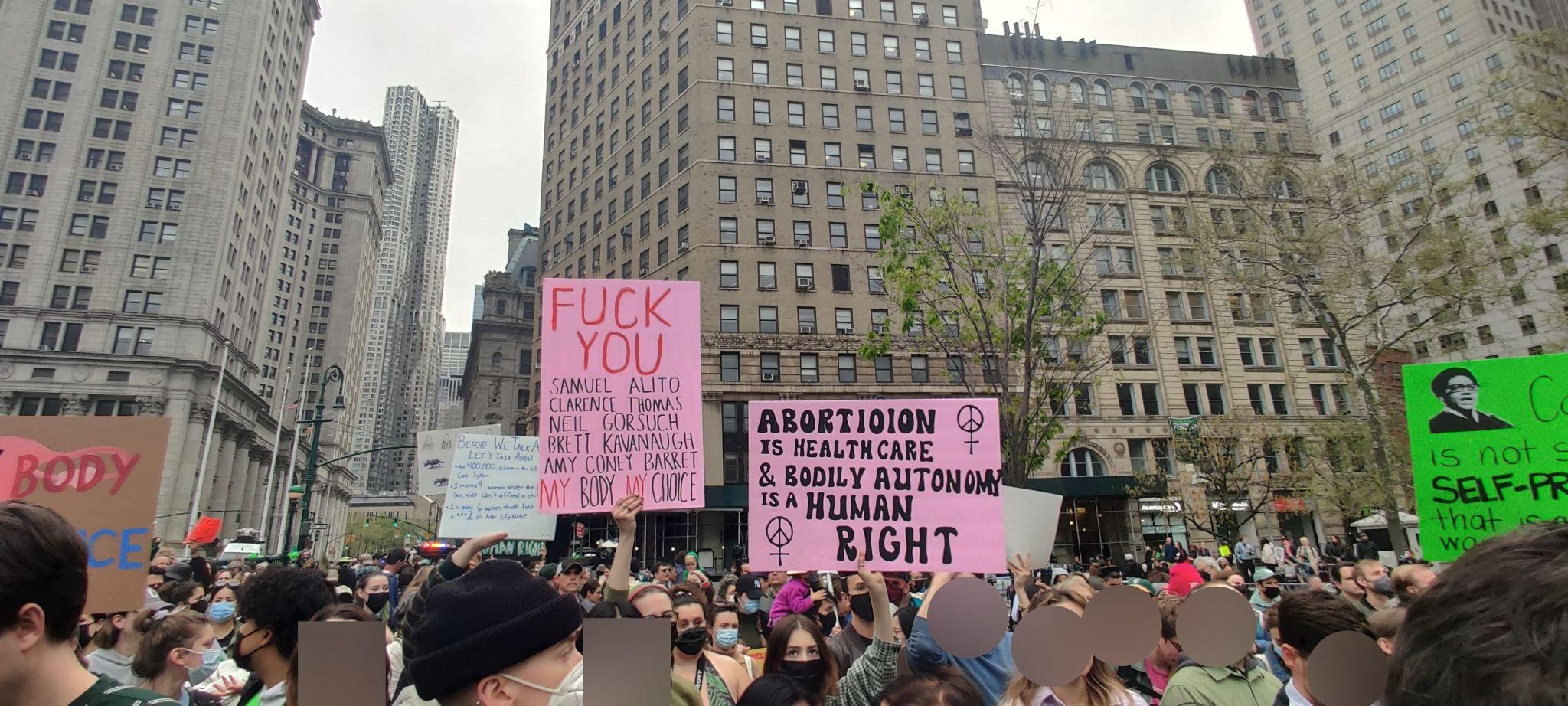
An abortion-rights protest (2022) in New York City

The landmark 2022 ruling Dobbs v. Jackson Women's Health which overturned the constitutional right to abortion established by Roe v. Wade, upended the landscape of the midterm elections, becoming a primary motivating factor for Democratic voters. Prior to Dobbs, inflation, alongside other economic concerns, had been the primary issues of the midterms, with some focus on immigration as well. Republicans continued to focus on these issues, but Dobbs gave Democrats a concrete motivating policy with which to turn out their voters, which they had previously lacked amid Joe Biden's declining approval ratings. Threats to American democracy remained a secondary motivating factor for Democrats in the wake of the January 6, 2021, United States Capitol attack. Abortion access was on the ballot in several states, either directly through ballot measures or indirectly through gubernatorial and legislative elections.

== Summary table ==
Regularly scheduled elections were held in 88 of the 99 state legislative chambers in the United States; nationwide, regularly scheduled elections were held for 6,064 of the 7,383 legislative seats. Most legislative chambers held elections for all seats, but some legislative chambers that use staggered elections held elections for only a portion of the total seats in the chamber. The chambers that were not up for election either hold regularly scheduled elections in odd-numbered years, or have four-year terms and hold all regularly scheduled elections in presidential election years.

Note that this table only covers regularly scheduled elections; additional special elections took place concurrently with these regularly scheduled elections.

State	Upper house				Lower house			
State	Seats up	Total	% up	Term	Seats up	Total	% up	Term
Alabama	35	35	100	4	105	105	100	4
Alaska	10	20	50	4	40	40	100	2
Arizona	30	30	100	2	60	60	100	2
Arkansas	18	35	51	2/4 (Note: The upper houses of Arkansas, Delaware, Florida, Hawaii, Illinois, Minnesota, New Jersey, and Texas use a 2-4-4 term length system.)	100	100	100	2
California	20	40	50	4	80	80	100	2
Colorado	17	35	49	4	65	65	100	2
Connecticut	36	36	100	2	151	151	100	2
Delaware	10	21	48	2/4	41	41	100	2
Florida	20	40	50	2/4	120	120	100	2
Georgia	56	56	100	2	180	180	100	2
Hawaii	12	25	48	2/4	51	51	100	2
Idaho	35	35	100	2	70	70	100	2
Illinois	39	59	66	2/4	118	118	100	2
Indiana	25	50	50	4	100	100	100	2
Iowa	25	50	50	4	100	100	100	2
Kansas	0	40	0	4	125	125	100	2
Kentucky	19	38	50	4	100	100	100	2
Louisiana	0	39	0	4	0	105	0	4
Maine	35	35	100	2	151	151	100	2
Maryland	47	47	100	4	141	141	100	4
Massachusetts	40	40	100	2	160	160	100	2
Michigan	38	38	100	4	110	110	100	2
Minnesota	67	67	100	2/4	134	134	100	2
Mississippi	0	52	0	4	0	122	0	4
Missouri	17	34	50	4	163	163	100	2
Montana	25	50	50	4	100	100	100	2
Nebraska	24 (Note: These figures represent the seats of Nebraska's unicameral legislature.)	49	49	4	N/A (unicameral)			
Nevada	11	21	52	4	42	42	100	2
New Hampshire	24	24	100	2	400	400	100	2
New Jersey	0	40	0	2/4	0	80	0	2
New Mexico	42	42	100	4	70	70	100	2
New York	63	63	100	2	150	150	100	2
North Carolina	50	50	100	2	120	120	100	2
North Dakota	24	47	51	4	47	94	50	4
Ohio	16	33	52	4	99	99	100	2
Oklahoma	24	48	50	4	101	101	100	2
Oregon	15	30	50	4	60	60	100	2
Pennsylvania	25	50	50	4	203	203	100	2
Rhode Island	38	38	100	2	75	75	100	2
South Carolina	0	46	0	4	124	124	100	2
South Dakota	35	35	100	2	70	70	100	2
Tennessee	17	33	52	4	99	99	100	2
Texas	15	31	48	2/4	150	150	100	2
Utah	14	29	48	4	75	75	100	2
Vermont	30	30	100	2	150	150	100	2
Virginia	0	40	0	4	0	100	0	2
Washington	25	49	49	4	98	98	100	2
West Virginia	17	34	50	4	100	100	100	2
Wisconsin	17	33	52	4	99	99	100	2
Wyoming	15	31	50	4	62	62	100	2
Total	1106	1973	56	N/A	4959	5413	92	N/A

== Redistricting ==
Partisan control of state legislative redistricting after the 2020 elections. Republican control (21) Split or bipartisan control (11) Independent redistricting commission (9) Democratic control (9)

The 2022 elections were the first held after redistricting following the 2020 census. All states holding elections in 2022 did so under new maps drawn in accordance with the new census results with the exception of Montana, which implements its new maps four years after the census as opposed to two. In a majority of states, legislative redistricting is controlled by the state legislature, often subject to gubernatorial veto. This allows for widespread gerrymandering, in which the party in power draws legislative boundaries to favor itself. Many states delegate redistricting power to an independent or bipartisan redistricting commission, often with the goal of minimizing or eliminating partisan gerrymandering.

=== New independent commissions ===
Four states established independent redistricting commissions via citizen-led ballot initiative prior to the 2020 redistricting cycle: Colorado, Michigan, Utah, and Virginia. The new commission in Michigan, especially, was significant due to its implementing of maps seen as fair, replacing maps seen as heavily gerrymandered to favor Republicans, which had been established as a part of Project REDMAP after the 2010 elections. In Utah, Republican legislators voted in 2020 to strip the state's newly established commission of its power, returning control over redistricting to the Republican-led legislature. In Virginia, the state's commission failed to agree on new legislative maps, leading the Supreme Court of Virginia to appoint a special master to draw its maps for use beginning in the 2023 elections.

=== Litigation ===
In a number of states, lawsuits successfully challenged district maps drawn by state legislatures. In Ohio and North Carolina, the states' respective Supreme Courts rejected the legislature's maps as unconstitutional partisan gerrymanders. In North Carolina, a second set of maps was eventually approved by the courts, but in Ohio, the courts continually rejected the new maps until a federal court forced them to let one set stand due to the impending primary election. In Minnesota and Wisconsin, redistricting fell to state courts after their legislatures and governors deadlocked. Wisconsin's litigation briefly involved the U.S. Supreme Court over concerns on the application of the Voting Rights Act in the state court's prior decision. The New York Court of Appeals overturned the state's new Senate map, drawn by the Democratic-controlled legislature, calling it an unconstitutional partisan gerrymander. Maps for the State Assembly were not overturned. The new Senate maps drawn by a special master substantially changed the districts drawn in New York City, greatly increasing the number of competitive districts.

=== Gerrymandering ===
In Michigan and Pennsylvania, new maps implemented by independent and bipartisan commissions were seen as much fairer compared to the states' previous maps. In Wisconsin, however, the court's chosen map was seen as favoring Republicans. All three states were severely affected by partisan gerrymandering during the 2010s due to Project REDMAP. Democrats had not won control of any legislative chambers in those states since 2008 despite winning the statewide popular vote multiple times. In Republican-led states such as Texas, Florida, and Georgia, Republican legislatures passed maps seen as gerrymandered and uncompetitive, while states such as Nevada did the same in favor of Democrats.

== Electoral predictions ==
Although the 2022 elections were initially expected to be highly Republican-favoring, given the increasing unpopularity of Democratic president Joe Biden, the overturning of Roe v. Wade in June dramatically shifted the national political environment. By the time of the elections, a similar number of Republican- and Democratic-controlled chambers were considered competitive, mostly in states won narrowly by Biden in the 2020 presidential election. Democrats' best chances for gains were seen in states such as Michigan, Arizona, and Pennsylvania, while Republicans' best chances were in Alaska, Maine, Nevada, Colorado, and Oregon. Both chambers of the Minnesota Legislature, one controlled by each party, were seen as highly-competitive. Overall, fewer legislative chambers were seen as competitive compared to previous cycles.

Most election predictors use:

- "Tossup": No advantage
- "Tilt": Advantage that is not quite as strong as "lean"
- "Lean": Slight advantage
- "Likely": Significant, but surmountable, advantage (Note: Sabato's Crystal Ball additionally uses the "Likely" characterization to indicate chambers where a shift in control is unlikely, but the minority party could make significant gains and/or break a legislative supermajority.)
- "Safe" or "Solid": Near-certain chance of victory

State	PVI	Chamber	Last election	Sabato Oct. 20, 2022	CNalysis Nov. 7, 2022	Result
Alabama	R+15	Senate	R 27–8	Safe R	Solid R	R 27–8
Alabama	R+15	House of Representatives	R 77–28	Safe R	Solid R	R 77–28
Alaska	R+8	Senate	R 14–6	Likely R	Solid R	Coal. 17–3
Alaska	R+8	House of Representatives	Coal. 21–17–2	Lean R (flip)	Lean R (flip)	Coal. 23–16–1
Arizona	R+2	Senate	R 16–14	Tossup	Lean R	R 16–14
Arizona	R+2	House of Representatives	R 31–29	Lean R	Likely R	R 31–29
Arkansas	R+16	Senate	R 27–7–1	Safe R	Solid R	R 29–6
Arkansas	R+16	House of Representatives	R 78–22	Safe R	Solid R	R 82–18
California	D+13	State Senate	D 31–9	Safe D	Solid D	D 32–8
California	D+13	State Assembly	D 60–19–1	Safe D	Solid D	D 62–18
Colorado	D+4	Senate	D 20–15	Lean D	Likely D	D 23–12
Colorado	D+4	House of Representatives	D 41–24	Likely D	Lean D	D 46–19
Connecticut	D+7	State Senate	D 23–13	Likely D	Lean D	D 24–12
Connecticut	D+7	House of Representatives	D 97–54	Likely D	Likely D	D 98–53
Delaware	D+7	Senate	D 14–7	Safe D	Solid D	D 15–6
Delaware	D+7	House of Representatives	D 26–15	Safe D	Solid D	D 26–15
Florida	R+3	Senate	R 24–16	Likely R	Solid R	R 28–12
Florida	R+3	House of Representatives	R 78–42	Safe R	Solid R	R 85–35
Georgia	R+3	State Senate	R 34–22	Likely R	Solid R	R 33–23
Georgia	R+3	House of Representatives	R 103–77	Likely R	Solid R	R 101–79
Hawaii	D+14	Senate	D 24–1	Safe D	Solid D	D 23–2
Hawaii	D+14	House of Representatives	D 47–4	Safe D	Solid D	D 45–6
Idaho	R+18	Senate	R 28–7	Safe R	Solid R	R 28–7
Idaho	R+18	House of Representatives	R 58–12	Safe R	Solid R	R 59–11
Illinois	D+7	Senate	D 41–18	Likely D	Very Likely D	D 40–19
Illinois	D+7	House of Representatives	D 73–45	Likely D	Very Likely D	D 78–40
Indiana	R+11	Senate	R 39–11	Safe R	Solid R	R 40–10
Indiana	R+11	House of Representatives	R 71–29	Safe R	Solid R	R 70–30
Iowa	R+6	Senate	R 32–18	Likely R	Solid R	R 34–16
Iowa	R+6	House of Representatives	R 60–40	Likely R	Solid R	R 64–36
Kansas	R+10	House of Representatives	R 86–39	Safe R	Solid R	R 85–40
Kentucky	R+16	Senate	R 30–8	Safe R	Solid R	R 31–7
Kentucky	R+16	House of Representatives	R 75–25	Safe R	Solid R	R 80–20
Maine	D+2	Senate	D 22–13	Tossup	Lean D	D 22–13
Maine	D+2	House of Representatives	D 82–66–3	Tossup	Tilt D	D 82–67–2
Maryland	D+14	Senate	D 32–15	Safe D	Solid D	D 34–13
Maryland	D+14	House of Delegates	D 99–42	Safe D	Solid D	D 102–39
Massachusetts	D+15	Senate	D 37–3	Safe D	Solid D	D 37–3
Massachusetts	D+15	House of Representatives	D 130–29–1	Safe D	Solid D	D 134–25–1
Michigan	R+1	Senate	R 22–16	Tossup	Tossup	D 20–18
Michigan	R+1	House of Representatives	R 58–52	Tossup	Tilt R	D 56–54
Minnesota	D+1	Senate	R 34–33	Lean R	Tilt R	D 34–33
Minnesota	D+1	House of Representatives	D 70–64	Tossup	Tilt R (flip)	D 70–64
Missouri	R+10	Senate	R 24–10	Safe R	Solid R	R 24–10
Missouri	R+10	House of Representatives	R 114–49	Safe R	Solid R	R 111–52
Montana	R+11	Senate	R 31–19	Safe R	Solid R	R 34–16
Montana	R+11	House of Representatives	R 67–33	Safe R	Solid R	R 68–32
Nevada	R+1	Senate	D 12–9	Tossup	Likely D	D 13–8
Nevada	R+1	Assembly	D 26–16	Lean D	Lean D	D 28–14
New Hampshire	D+1	Senate	R 14–10	Likely R	Very Likely R	R 14–10
New Hampshire	D+1	House of Representatives	R 213–187	Lean R	Likely R	R 201–199
New Mexico	D+3	House of Representatives	D 45–24–1	Likely D	Likely D	D 45–25
New York	D+10	State Senate	D 43–20	Likely D	Solid D	D 42–21
New York	D+10	State Assembly	D 107–43	Safe D	Solid D	D 102–48
North Carolina	R+3	Senate	R 28–22	Likely R	Solid R	R 30–20
North Carolina	R+3	House of Representatives	R 69–51	Likely R	Solid R	R 71–49
North Dakota	R+20	Senate	R 40–7	Safe R	Solid R	R 43–4
North Dakota	R+20	House of Representatives	R 80–14	Safe R	Solid R	R 82–12
Ohio	R+6	Senate	R 25–8	Safe R	Solid R	R 26–7
Ohio	R+6	House of Representatives	R 64–35	Safe R	Solid R	R 67–31
Oklahoma	R+20	Senate	R 39–9	Safe R	Solid R	R 40–8
Oklahoma	R+20	House of Representatives	R 82–19	Safe R	Solid R	R 81–20
Oregon	D+6	State Senate	D 18–11–1	Lean D	Tilt D	D 17–12–1
Oregon	D+6	House of Representatives	D 37–23	Likely D	Tilt D	D 35–25
Pennsylvania	R+2	State Senate	R 28–21–1	Likely R	Solid R	R 28–22
Pennsylvania	R+2	House of Representatives	R 113–90	Lean R	Lean R	D 102–101
Rhode Island	D+8	Senate	D 33–5	Safe D	Solid D	D 33–5
Rhode Island	D+8	House of Representatives	D 65–10	Safe D	Solid D	D 65–9–1
South Carolina	R+8	House of Representatives	R 81–43	Safe R	Solid R	R 88–36
South Dakota	R+16	Senate	R 32–3	Safe R	Solid R	R 31–4
South Dakota	R+16	House of Representatives	R 62–8	Safe R	Solid R	R 63–7
Tennessee	R+14	Senate	R 27–6	Safe R	Solid R	R 27–6
Tennessee	R+14	House of Representatives	R 73–26	Safe R	Solid R	R 75–24
Texas	R+5	Senate	R 18–13	Safe R	Solid R	R 19–12
Texas	R+5	House of Representatives	R 83–67	Safe R	Solid R	R 86–64
Utah	R+13	State Senate	R 23–6	Safe R	Solid R	R 23–6
Utah	R+13	House of Representatives	R 58–17	Safe R	Solid R	R 61–14
Vermont	D+16	Senate	D 21–7–2	Safe D	Solid D	D 22–7–1
Vermont	D+16	House of Representatives	D 92–46–7–5	Safe D	Solid D	D 104–38–5–3
Washington	D+8	State Senate	D 28–21	Safe D	Likely D	D 29–20
Washington	D+8	House of Representatives	D 57–41	Safe D	Tilt D	D 58–40
West Virginia	R+22	Senate	R 23–11	Safe R	Solid R	R 30–4
West Virginia	R+22	House of Delegates	R 78–22	Safe R	Solid R	R 88–12
Wisconsin	R+2	Senate	R 21–12	Safe R	Solid R	R 22–11
Wisconsin	R+2	State Assembly	R 61–38	Safe R	Solid R	R 64–35
Wyoming	R+25	Senate	R 28–2	Safe R	Solid R	R 29–2
Wyoming	R+25	House of Representatives	R 51–7–1–1	Safe R	Solid R	R 57–5

== National results ==
Lower house results by party
Party	Seats before (Note: Counts seats that were vacant prior to the election towards the party that last held them)	Chambers before	Popular vote	%	Seats after	+/-	Chambers after	+/-
Republican	2,939	30	48,230,878	51.62%	2,948	▲9	28	▼2
Democratic	2,438	18	43,530,467	46.59%	2,440	▲2	20	▲2
Independent	19	0	430,731	0.46%	13	▼6	0	Steady
Progressive	7	0	12,577	0.01%	5	▼2	0	Steady
Libertarian	1	0	375,909	0.40%	0	▼1	0	Steady
Green	0	0	30,871	0.03%	0	Steady	0	Steady
Others	0	1	815,447	0.87%	0	Steady	1	Steady
Total	5,411	49	93,426,880	100.00%	5,413	▲2	49	—

Upper house results by party (Note: Counts seats in the officially nonpartisan Nebraska legislature towards the party that endorsed each candidate)
Party	Seats before	Chambers before	Popular vote	%	Seats after	+/-	Chambers after	+/-
Republican	1,096	32	34,096,140	50.96%	1,113	▲17	29	▼3
Democratic	869	18	31,287,148	46.76%	858	▼11	20	▲2
Independent	5	0	249,865	0.37%	1	▼4	0	Steady
Progressive	2	0	12,377	0.02%	1	▼1	0	Steady
Libertarian	0	0	422,193	0.63%	0	Steady	0	Steady
Green	0	0	77,932	0.12%	0	Steady	0	Steady
Others	0	0	767,370	1.15%	0	Steady	1	▲1
Total	1,972	50	66,913,025	100.00%	1,973	▲1	50	—

The Democrats flipped the Minnesota Senate, the Michigan Senate for the first time since 1984, and the Michigan House of Representatives from Republican control, and they also established a coalition government in the Alaska Senate. Meanwhile, the Alaska House of Representatives switched from a Democratic-led coalition to a Republican-led coalition. Further special elections on February 7, 2023, gave Democrats control of the Pennsylvania House of Representatives. Democrats had won control of the chamber in 2022, but vacancies prevented them from seating it until after the special elections. Additionally, Democrats gained a supermajority in the Vermont General Assembly, which combined with their supermajority in the Vermont Senate, allowed Democrats to override any vetoes from Republican governor Phil Scott. Republicans gained a supermajority in the North Carolina Senate, and while they initially fell one seat shy of a supermajority in the General Assembly, they later gained one in April 2023 when a lawmaker switched parties, allowing them to override vetoes from Democratic governor Roy Cooper.

== Maps ==
Partisan control of state governments following the 2022 elections:
Democratic trifecta maintained
Republican trifecta maintained
Democratic trifecta established
Divided government established
Divided government maintained
Officially non-partisan, unicameral legislature

Upper house seats by party holding majority in each state
Republican 50–60% 60–70% 70–80% 80–90% 90–100%	Democratic 50–60% 60–70% 70–80% 80–90% 90–100%

Lower house seats by party holding majority in each state
Republican 50–60% 60–70% 70–80% 80–90% 90–100%	Democratic 50–60% 60–70% 70–80% 80–90%

Net changes to upper house seats after the 2022 elections
+1 Rep seat +2 Rep seats +3–4 Rep seats +7 Rep seats
+1 Dem seat +2 Dem seats +3–4 Dem seats

Net changes to lower house seats after the 2022 elections
+1 Rep seat +2 Rep seats +3–5 Rep seats +6–10 Rep seats
+1 Dem seat +2 Dem seats +3–5 Dem seats +12 Dem seats
+2 Ind seats

== State summaries ==
=== Alabama ===
All of the seats of the Alabama Legislature were up for election. Republicans maintained control of both chambers.

Senate results

House of Representatives results

Alabama Senate
Party	Leader	Before	After	Change
Republican	Greg Reed	27	27	Steady
Democratic	Bobby Singleton	8	8	Steady
Total		35	35	

Alabama House of Representatives
Party	Leader	Before	After	Change
Republican	Mac McCutcheon (retired)	77	77	Steady
Democratic	Anthony Daniels	28	28	Steady
Total		105	105	

=== Alaska ===
Senate results

House of Representatives results

Half of the seats of the Alaska Senate and all of the seats of the Alaska House of Representatives were up for election. The Alaska House of Representatives is controlled by a coalition of Democrats, Republicans, and independents. The Alaska Senate flipped from Republican control to a coalition of Democrats and Republicans.

Alaska Senate
Party	Leader	Before	After	Change
Democratic	Tom Begich (retired)	6	9	▲2
Democratic	Tom Begich (retired)	1	9	▲2
Republican	Peter Micciche (retired)	13	8	▼2
Republican	Peter Micciche (retired)	13	3	▼2
Total		20	20	

Alaska House of Representatives
Party	Leader	Before	After	Change
Republican	Cathy Tilton	17	19	▲1
Republican	Cathy Tilton	2	1	▲1
Independent	—	4	2	▲2
Independent	—	4	4	▲2
Democratic	Louise Stutes (retiring as leader)	15	2	▼2
Democratic	Louise Stutes (retiring as leader)	15	11	▼2
Independent; Republican	—	2 (Note: Consists of two Republican representatives (Sara Rasmussen and David Eastman) who are not members of the Republican caucus.)	1	▼1
Total		40	40	

=== Arizona ===
Senate results

House of Representatives results

All of the seats of the Arizona Legislature were up for election. Republicans maintained control of both chambers.

Arizona Senate
Party	Leader	Before	After	Change
Republican	Karen Fann (retired)	16	16	Steady
Democratic	Rebecca Rios (retired)	14	14	Steady
Total		30	30	

Arizona House of Representatives
Party	Leader	Before	After	Change
Republican	Russell Bowers (term-limited)	31	31	Steady
Democratic	Reginald Bolding (retired)	29	29	Steady
Total		60	60	

=== Arkansas ===
Senate results

House of Representatives results

All of the seats of the Arkansas House of Representatives and half of the Arkansas Senate were up for election. Republicans maintained control of both chambers.

Arkansas State Senate
Party	Leader	Before	After	Change
Republican	Jimmy Hickey Jr.	27	29	▲2
Democratic	Keith Ingram (retired)	7	6	▼1
Independent	Jim Hendren (retired)	1	0	▼1
Total		35	35	

Arkansas House of Representatives
Party	Leader	Before	After	Change
Republican	Matthew Shepherd	78	82	▲4
Democratic	Tippi McCullough	22	18	▼4
Total		100	100	

=== California ===
Senate results

State Assembly results

All of the seats of the California House of Representatives and half of the California Senate were up for election. Democrats maintained control of both chambers.

California State Senate
Party	Leader	Before	After	Change
Democratic	Toni Atkins	31	32	▲1
Republican	Scott Wilk	9	8	▼1
Total		40	40	

California General Assembly
Party	Leader	Before	After	Change
Democratic	Anthony Rendon	60	62	▲2
Republican	James Gallagher	19	18	▼1
Independent	Chad Mayes (retired)	1	0	▼1
Total		80	80	

=== Colorado ===
Senate results

House of Representatives results

All of the seats of the Colorado House of Representatives and half of the Colorado Senate were up for election. Democrats maintained control of both chambers.

Colorado State Senate
Party	Leader	Before	After	Change
Democratic	Steve Fenberg	21	23	▲2
Republican	John Cooke (term-limited)	14	12	▼2
Total		35	35	

Colorado House of Representatives
Party	Leader	Before	After	Change
Democratic	Alec Garnett (term-limited)	41	46	▲5
Republican	Hugh McKean (Note: McKean died nine days before the general election. His successor as minority leader, Rod Pelton, did not assume the position until after the general election.)	24	19	▼5
Total		65	65	

=== Connecticut ===
Senate results

House of Representatives results

All of the seats of the Connecticut Legislature were up for election. Democrats maintained control of both chambers.

Connecticut State Senate
Party	Leader	Before	After	Change
Democratic	Martin Looney	23	24	▲1
Republican	Kevin C. Kelly	13	12	▼1
Total		36	36	

Connecticut House of Representatives
Party	Leader	Before	After	Change
Democratic	Matthew Ritter	97	98	▲1
Republican	Vincent Candelora	54	53	▼1
Total		151	151	

=== Delaware ===
Senate results

House of Representatives election

All of the seats of the Delaware House of Representatives and half of the Delaware Senate were up for election. Democrats maintained control of both chambers.

Delaware State Senate
Party	Leader	Before	After	Change
Democratic	David Sokola	14	15	▲1
Republican	Gerald Hocker	7	6	▼1
Total		21	21	

Delaware House of Representatives
Party	Leader	Before	After	Change
Democratic	Peter Schwartzkopf	26	26	Steady
Republican	Daniel Short	15	15	Steady
Total		41	41	

=== Florida ===
Senate results

House of Representatives results

All of the seats of the Florida House of Representatives and half of the Florida Senate were up for election. Republicans maintained control of both chambers.

Florida Senate
Party	Leader	Before	After	Change
Republican	Wilton Simpson (term-limited)	24	28	▲4
Democratic	Lauren Book	16	12	▼4
Total		40	40	

Florida House of Representatives
Party	Leader	Before	After	Change
Republican	Chris Sprowls (term-limited)	78	85	▲7
Democratic	Evan Jenne (term-limited)	42	35	▼7
Total		120	120	

=== Georgia ===
Senate results

House of Representatives results

All of the seats of the Georgia Legislature were up for election. Republicans maintained control of both chambers.

Georgia State Senate
Party	Leader	Before	After	Change
Republican	Butch Miller (retired)	34	33	▼1
Democratic	Gloria Butler	22	23	▲1
Total		56	56	

Georgia House of Representatives
Party	Leader	Before	After	Change
Republican	David Ralston	103	101	▼2
Democratic	James Beverly	77	79	▲2
Total		180	180	

=== Hawaii ===
Senate results

House of Representatives results

All of the seats of the Hawaii House of Representatives and half of the Hawaii Senate were up for election. Democrats maintained control of both chambers.

Hawaii Senate
Party	Leader	Before	After	Change
Democratic	Ron Kouchi	24	23	▼1
Republican	Kurt Fevella	1	2	▲1
Total		25	25	

Hawaii House of Representatives
Party	Leader	Before	After	Change
Democratic	Scott Saiki	47	45	▼2
Republican	Val Okimoto (retired)	4	6	▲2
Total		51	51	

=== Idaho ===
Senate results

All of the seats of the Idaho Legislature were up for election. Republicans maintained control of both chambers.

Idaho Senate
Party	Leader	Before	After	Change
Republican	Chuck Winder	28	28	Steady
Democratic	Michelle Stennett (retired)	7	7	Steady
Total		35	35	

Idaho House of Representatives
Party	Leader	Before	After	Change
Republican	Scott Bedke (retired)	58	59	▲1
Democratic	Ilana Rubel	12	11	▼1
Total		70	70	

=== Illinois ===
Senate results

House of Representatives results

All of the seats of the Illinois House of Representatives and 2/3rds of the Illinois Senate were up for election. Democrats maintained control of both chambers.

Illinois Senate
Party	Leader	Before	After	Change
Democratic	Don Harmon	41	40	▼1
Republican	Dan McConchie	18	19	▲1
Total		59	59	

Illinois House of Representatives
Party	Leader	Before	After	Change
Democratic	Chris Welch	73	78	▲5
Republican	Jim Durkin	45	40	▼5
Total		118	118	

=== Indiana ===
Senate results

House of Representatives results

All of the seats of the Indiana House of Representatives and half of the Indiana Senate were up for election. Republicans maintained control of both chambers.

Indiana Senate
Party	Leader	Before	After	Change
Republican	Rodric Bray	39	40	▲1
Democratic	Greg Taylor	11	10	▼1
Total		50	50	

Indiana House of Representatives
Party	Leader	Before	After	Change
Republican	Todd Huston	71	70	▼1
Democratic	Phil GiaQuinta	29	30	▲1
Total		100	100	

=== Iowa ===
Senate results

House of Representatives results

All of the seats of the Iowa House of Representatives and half of the Iowa Senate were up for election. Republicans maintained control of both chambers.

Iowa Senate
Party	Leader	Before	After	Change
Republican	Jack Whitver	32	34	▲2
Democratic	Zach Wahls	18	16	▼2
Total		50	50	

Iowa House of Representatives
Party	Leader	Before	After	Change
Republican	Pat Grassley	60	64	▲4
Democratic	Jennifer Konfrst	40	36	▼4
Total		100	100	

=== Kansas ===
All of the seats of the Kansas House of Representatives were up for election. Republicans maintained control of both chambers.

Kansas House of Representatives
Party	Leader	Before	After	Change
Republican	Ron Ryckman Jr. (retired)	86	85	▼1
Democratic	Tom Sawyer	39	40	▲1
Total		125	125	

=== Kentucky ===
Senate results

House of Representatives results

All of the seats of the Kentucky House of Representatives and half of the Kentucky Senate were up for election. Republicans maintained control of both chambers.

Kentucky Senate
Party	Leader	Before	After	Change
Republican	Robert Stivers	30	31	▲1
Democratic	Morgan McGarvey (retired)	8	7	▼1
Total		38	38	

Kentucky House of Representatives
Party	Leader	Before	After	Change
Republican	David Osborne	75	80	▲5
Democratic	Joni Jenkins	25	20	▼5
Total		100	100	

=== Maine ===
Senate results

House of Representatives results

All of the seats of the Maine Legislature were up for election. Democrats maintained control of both chambers.

Maine Senate
Party	Leader	Before	After	Change
Democratic	Troy Jackson	22	22	Steady
Republican	Jeff Timberlake	13	13	Steady
Total		35	35	

Maine House of Representatives
Party	Leader	Before	After	Change
Democratic	Ryan Fecteau (term-limited)	81	82	▲1
Republican	Kathleen Dillingham (term-limited)	66	67	▲1
Independent		4	2	▼2
Total		151	151	

=== Maryland ===
All of the seats of the Maryland Legislature were up for election. Democrats maintained control of both chambers.

Maryland Senate
Party	Leader	Before	After	Change
Democratic	Bill Ferguson	32	34	▲2
Republican	Bryan Simonaire	15	13	▼2
Total		47	47	

Maryland House of Delegates
Party	Leader	Before	After	Change
Democratic	Adrienne A. Jones	99	102	▲3
Republican	Jason C. Buckel	42	39	▼3
Total		141	141	

=== Massachusetts ===
Senate results

House of Representatives results

All of the seats of the Massachusetts General Court were up for election. Democrats maintained control of both chambers.

Massachusetts Senate
Party	Leader	Before	After	Change
Democratic	Karen Spilka	37	37	Steady
Republican	Bruce Tarr	3	3	Steady
Total		40	40	

Massachusetts House of Representatives
Party	Leader	Before	After	Change
Democratic	Ron Mariano	130	134	▲4
Independent	Ron Mariano	1	1	▲4
Republican	Bradley Jones Jr.	29	25	▼4
Total		160	160	

=== Michigan ===
All of the seats of the Michigan Legislature were up for election. Democrats won control of both chambers.

Michigan Senate
Party	Leader	Before	After	Change
Democratic	Jim Ananich (term-limited)	16	20	▲4
Republican	Mike Shirkey (term-limited)	22	18	▼4
Total		38	38	

Michigan House of Representatives
Party	Leader	Before	After	Change
Democratic	Donna Lasinski (term-limited)	53	56	▲3
Republican	Jason Wentworth (term-limited)	57	54	▼3
Total		110	110	

=== Minnesota ===
All of the seats of the Minnesota Legislature were up for election. Democrats maintained control of the Minnesota House of representatives and won control of the Minnesota Senate.

Minnesota Senate
Party	Leader	Before	After	Change
Democratic (DFL)	Melisa Franzen (retired)	31	34	▲3
Republican	Jeremy Miller	34	33	▼1
Independent	—	2	0	▼2
Total		67	67	

Minnesota House of Representatives
Party	Leader	Before	After	Change
Democratic (DFL)	Melissa Hortman	69	70	▲1
Republican	Kurt Daudt	63	64	▲1
Independent	—	1	0	▼1
Independent Republican	—	1	0	▼1
Total		134	134	

=== Missouri ===
Senate results

House of Representatives results

All of the seats of the Missouri House of Representatives and half of the Missouri Senate were up for election. Republicans maintained control of both chambers.

Missouri Senate
Party	Leader	Before	After	Change
Republican	Dave Schatz (term-limited)	24	24	Steady
Democratic	John Rizzo	10	10	Steady
Total		34	34	

Missouri House of Representatives
Party	Leader	Before	After	Change
Republican	Rob Vescovo (term-limited)	114	111	▼3
Democratic	Crystal Quade	49	52	▲3
Total		163	163	

=== Montana ===
Senate results

House of Representatives results

All of the seats of the Montana House of Representatives and half of the Montana Senate were up for election. Republicans maintained control of both chambers.

Montana Senate
Party	Leader	Before	After	Change
Republican	Mark Blasdel (term-limited)	31	34	▲3
Democratic	Jill Cohenour (term-limited)	19	16	▼3
Total		50	50	

Montana House of Representatives
Party	Leader	Before	After	Change
Republican	Wylie Galt (term-limited)	67	68	▲1
Democratic	Kim Abbott	33	32	▼1
Total		100	100	

=== Nebraska ===
Legislative results

All of the seats of the Nebraska Legislature were up for election. Republicans maintained control of the officially non-partisan chamber.

Nebraska Legislature
Party	Before	After	Change
Republican	32	32	Steady
Democratic	17	17	Steady
Total	49	49	

=== Nevada ===
Senate results

Assembly results

All of the seats of the Nevada House of Representatives and half of the Nevada Senate were up for election. Democrats maintained control of both chambers.

Nevada Senate
Party	Leader	Before	After	Change
Democratic	Nicole Cannizzaro	12	13	▲1
Republican	James Settelmeyer (term-limited)	9	8	▼1
Total		21	21	

Nevada Assembly
Party	Leader	Before	After	Change
Democratic	Steve Yeager (acting)	26	28	▲2
Republican	Robin L. Titus (retired)	16	14	▼2
Total		42	42	

=== New Hampshire ===
Senate results

House of Representatives results

All of the seats of the New Hampshire General Court were up for election. Republicans maintained control of both chambers.

New Hampshire Senate
Party	Leader	Before	After	Change
Republican	Chuck Morse (retired)	14	14	Steady
Democratic	Donna Soucy	10	10	Steady
Total		24	24	

New Hampshire House of Representatives
Party	Leader	Before	After	Change
Republican	Sherman Packard	211	201	▼10
Democratic	David Cote	187	199	▲12
Independent	—	2	0	▼2
Total		400	400	

=== New Mexico ===
All of the seats of the New Mexico House of Representatives were up for election. Democrats maintained control of both chambers.

New Mexico House of Representatives
Party	Leader	Before	After	Change
Democratic	Brian Egolf (retired)	45	45	Steady
Republican	James G. Townsend	24	25	▲1
Independent	Phelps Anderson (retired)	1	0	▼1
Total		70	70	

=== New York ===
Senate results

House of Representatives results

All of the seats of the New York Legislature were up for election. Democrats maintained control of both chambers.

New York State Senate
Party	Leader	Before	After	Change
Democratic	Andrea Stewart-Cousins	43	42	▼1
Republican	Rob Ortt	20	21	▲1
Total		63	63	

New York State Assembly
Party	Leader	Before	After	Change
Democratic	Carl Heastie	107	102	▼5
Republican	William Barclay	43	48	▲5
Total		150	150	

=== North Carolina ===
Senate results

House of Representatives results

All of the seats of the North Carolina Legislature were up for election. Republicans maintained control of both chambers.

North Carolina Senate
Party	Leader	Before	After	Change
Republican	Phil Berger	28	30	▲2
Democratic	Dan Blue	22	20	▼2
Total		50	50	

North Carolina House of Representatives
Party	Leader	Before	After	Change
Republican	Tim Moore	69	71	▲2
Democratic	Robert Reives	51	49	▼2
Total		120	120	

=== North Dakota ===
Senate results

House of Representatives results

Half of both chambers of the North Dakota Legislature were up for election. Republicans maintained control of both chambers.

North Dakota Senate
Party	Leader	Before	After	Change
Republican	Larry Luick	40	43	▲3
Democratic-NPL	Joan Heckaman (retired)	7	4	▼3
Total		47	47	

North Dakota House of Representatives
Party	Leader	Before	After	Change
Republican	Kim Koppelman (retired)	80	82	▲2
Democratic-NPL	Joshua Boschee	14	12	▼2
Total		94	94	

=== Ohio ===
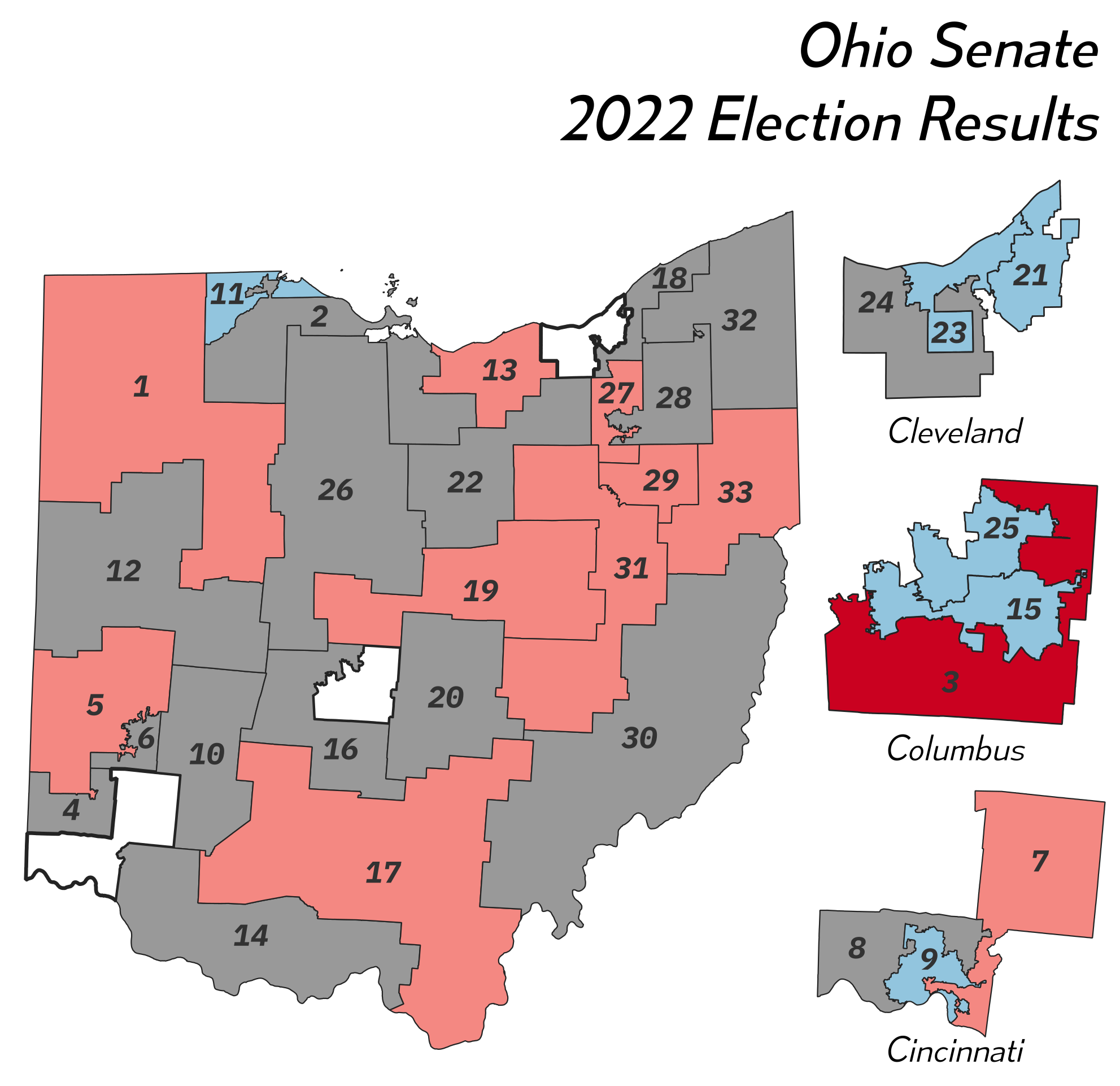
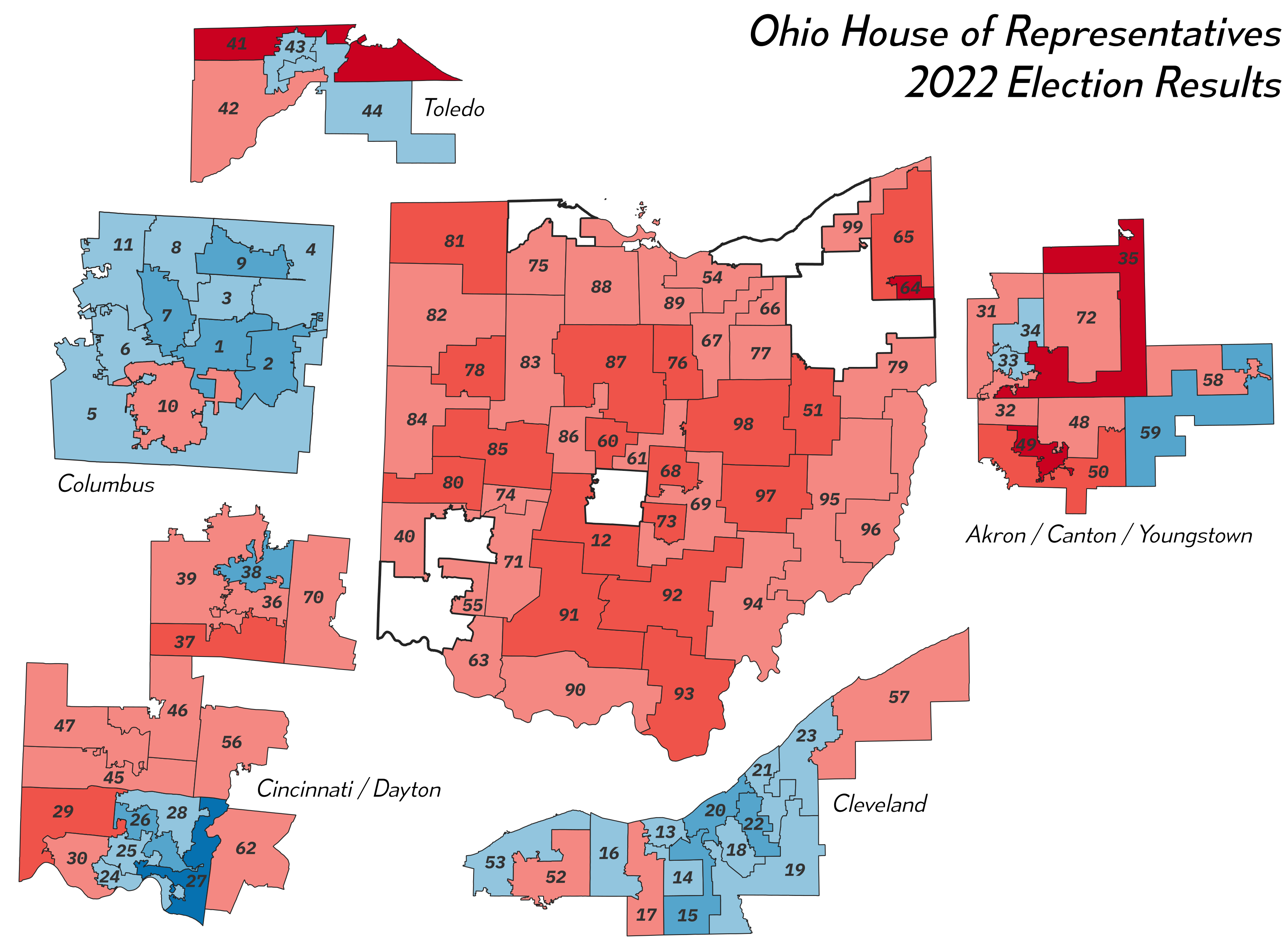

All of the seats of the Ohio House of Representatives and half of the Ohio Senate were up for election. Republicans maintained control of both chambers.

Ohio Senate
Party	Leader	Before	After	Change
Republican	Matt Huffman	25	26	▲1
Democratic	Kenny Yuko (term-limited)	8	7	▼1
Total		33	33	

Ohio House of Representatives
Party	Leader	Before	After	Change
Republican	Robert R. Cupp (term-limited)	64	67	▲3
Democratic	Allison Russo	35	31	▼3
Total		99	99	

=== Oklahoma ===
Senate results

House of Representatives results

All of the seats of the Oklahoma House of Representatives and half of the Oklahoma Senate were up for election. Republicans maintained control of both chambers.

Oklahoma Senate
Party	Leader	Before	After	Change
Republican	Greg Treat (term-limited)	39	40	▲1
Democratic	Kay Floyd	9	8	▼1
Total		48	48	

Oklahoma House of Representatives
Party	Leader	Before	After	Change
Republican	Charles McCall	82	81	▼1
Democratic	Emily Virgin (term-limited)	19	20	▲1
Total		101	101	

=== Oregon ===
Senate results

House of Representatives results

All of the seats of the Oregon House of Representatives and half of the Oregon Senate were up for election. Democrats maintained control of both chambers.

Oregon State Senate
Party	Leader	Before	After	Change
Democratic	Peter Courtney (retired)	18	17	▼1
Republican	Tim Knopp	10	11	▲1
Oregon Independent	—	1	1	Steady
Independent Republican	—	1	1	Steady
Total		30	30	

Oregon House of Representatives
Party	Leader	Before	After	Change
Democratic	Dan Rayfield	37	35	▼2
Republican	Vikki Breese-Iverson	23	25	▲2
Total		60	60	

=== Pennsylvania ===
Senate results

House of Representatives results

All of the seats of the Pennsylvania House of Representatives and half of the Pennsylvania Senate were up for election. Democrats won control of the House of Representatives, while Republicans maintained control of the Senate.

Pennsylvania State Senate
Party	Leader	Before	After	Change
Republican	Jake Corman (retired)	28	28	Steady
Democratic	Jay Costa	21	22	▲1
Independent	John Yudichak (retired)	1	0	▼1
Total		50	50	

Pennsylvania House of Representatives
Party	Leader	Before	After	Change
Democratic	Joanna McClinton	90	102	▲12
Republican	Bryan Cutler	113	101	▼12
Total		203	203	

=== Rhode Island ===
Senate results

House of Representatives results

All of the seats of the Rhode Island Legislature were up for election. Democrats maintained control of both chambers.

Rhode Island Senate
Party	Leader	Before	After	Change
Democratic	Dominick J. Ruggerio	33	33	Steady
Republican	Jessica de la Cruz	5	5	Steady
Total		38	38	

Rhode Island House of Representatives
Party	Leader	Before	After	Change
Democratic	Joe Shekarchi	65	65	Steady
Republican	Michael Chippendale	10	9	Steady
Independent	Michael Chippendale	—	1	Steady
Total		75	75	

=== South Carolina ===
All of the seats of the South Carolina House of Representatives were up for election. Republicans maintained control of both chambers.

South Carolina House of Representatives
Party	Leader	Before	After	Change
Republican	Murrell Smith, Jr.	81	88	▲7
Democratic	Todd Rutherford	43	36	▼7
Total		124	124	

=== South Dakota ===
Senate results

House of Representatives results

All of the seats of the South Dakota Legislature were up for election. Republicans maintained control of both chambers.

South Dakota Senate
Party	Leader	Before	After	Change
Republican	Lee Schoenbeck	32	31	▼1
Democratic	Troy Heinert (term-limited)	3	4	▲1
Total		35	35	

South Dakota House of Representatives
Party	Leader	Before	After	Change
Republican	Spencer Gosch (retired)	62	63	▲1
Democratic	Jamie Smith (retired)	8	7	▼1
Total		70	70	

=== Tennessee ===
Senate results

House of Representatives results

All of the seats of the Tennessee House of Representatives and half of the Tennessee Senate were up for election. Republicans maintained control of both chambers.

Tennessee Senate
Party	Leader	Before	After	Change
Republican	Randy McNally	27	27	Steady
Democratic	Jeff Yarbro	6	6	Steady
Total		33	33	

Tennessee House of Representatives
Party	Leader	Before	After	Change
Republican	Cameron Sexton	73	75	▲2
Democratic	Karen Camper	25	24	▼1
Independent	Karen Camper	1	0	▼1
Total		99	99	

=== Texas ===
Senate results

House of Representatives results

All of the seats of the Texas Legislature were up for election. Republicans maintained control of both chambers.

Texas Senate
Party	Leader	Before	After	Change
Republican	Paul Bettencourt	18	19	▲1
Democratic	Carol Alvarado	13	12	▼1
Total		31	31	

Texas House of Representatives
Party	Leader	Before	After	Change
Republican	Dade Phelan	85	86	▲1
Democratic	Chris Turner	65	64	▼1
Total		150	150	

=== Utah ===
Senate results

House of Representatives results

All of the seats of the Utah House of Representatives and half of the Utah Senate were up for election. Republicans maintained control of both chambers.

Utah Senate
Party	Leader	Before	After	Change
Republican	J. Stuart Adams	23	23	Steady
Democratic	Karen Mayne	6	6	Steady
Total		29	29	

Utah House of Representatives
Party	Leader	Before	After	Change
Republican	Brad Wilson	58	61	▲3
Democratic	Brian King	17	14	▼3
Total		75	75	

=== Vermont ===
Senate results

House of Representatives results

All of the seats of the Vermont Legislature were up for election. Democrats maintained control of both chambers.

Vermont Senate
Party	Leader	Before	After	Change
Democratic	Becca Balint (retired)	21	22	▲1
Republican	Randy Brock	7	7	Steady
Progressive	Anthony Pollina (retired)	2	1	▼1
Total		30	30	

Vermont House of Representatives
Party	Leader	Before	After	Change
Democratic	Jill Krowinski	92	104	▲12
Republican	Patricia McCoy	46	38	▼8
Progressive	Selene Colburn (retired)	7	5	▼2
Independent		5	3	▼2
Total		150	150	

=== Washington ===
Senate results

House of Representatives results

All of the seats of the Washington House of Representatives and half of the Washington Senate were up for election. Democrats maintained control of both chambers.

Washington State Senate
Party	Leader	Before	After	Change
Democratic	Karen Keiser	28	29	Steady
Democratic	John Braun	1 (Note: One Democrat caucused with the Republicans)	29	Steady
Republican	John Braun	20	20	Steady
Total		49	49	

Washington House of Representatives
Party	Leader	Before	After	Change
Democratic	Laurie Jinkins	57	58	▲1
Republican	J. T. Wilcox	41	40	▼1
Total		98	98	

=== West Virginia ===
Senate results

House of Delegates results

All of the seats of the West Virginia House of Delegates and half of the West Virginia Senate were up for election. Republicans maintained control of both chambers.

West Virginia Senate
Party	Leader	Before	After	Change
Republican	Craig Blair	23	30	▲7
Democratic	Stephen Baldwin	11	4	▼7
Total		34	34	

West Virginia House of Delegates
Party	Leader	Before	After	Change
Republican	Roger Hanshaw	78	88	▲10
Democratic	Doug Skaff	22	12	▼10
Total		100	100	

=== Wisconsin ===
Senate results

State Assembly results

All of the seats of the Wisconsin Assembly and half of the Wisconsin Senate were up for election. Republicans maintained control of both chambers.

Wisconsin Senate
Party	Leader	Before	After	Change
Republican	Devin LeMahieu	21	22	▲1
Democratic	Janet Bewley (retired)	12	11	▼1
Total		33	33	

Wisconsin State Assembly
Party	Leader	Before	After	Change
Republican	Robin Vos	61	64	▲3
Democratic	Greta Neubauer	38	35	▼3
Total		99	99	

=== Wyoming ===
Senate results

House of Representatives results

All of the seats of the Wyoming House of Representatives and half of the Wyoming Senate were up for election. Republicans maintained control of both chambers.

Wyoming Senate
Party	Leader	Before	After	Change
Republican	Dan Dockstader (retired)	28	29	▲1
Democratic	Chris Rothfuss	2	2	Steady
Total		30	31	

Wyoming House of Representatives
Party	Leader	Before	After	Change
Republican	Eric Barlow (retired)	51	57	▲6
Democratic	Cathy Connolly (retired)	7	5	▼2
Libertarian	Marshall Burt (defeated)	1	0	▼1
Independent	—N/a	1	0	▼1
Total		60	62	

== Territorial and federal district summaries ==
=== American Samoa ===
All of the seats of the American Samoa House of Representatives were up for election. Members of the House of Representatives serve two-year terms. Gubernatorial and legislative elections are conducted on a nonpartisan basis in American Samoa.

=== Guam ===
All of the seats of the unicameral Legislature of Guam were up for election. All members of the legislature serve a two-year term. Democrats retained control of the legislature.

Guam Legislature
Party	Leader	Before	After	Change
Democratic	Tina Rose Muña Barnes	8	9	▲1
Republican	Telo T. Taitague	7	6	▼1
Total		15	15	

=== Northern Mariana Islands ===
A portion of the seats of the Northern Mariana Islands Senate, and all of the seats of the Northern Mariana Islands House of Representatives, were up for election. Members of the senate serve either four-year terms, while members of the house serve two-year terms. A coalition of Independents and Democrats replaced the Republican-controlled Senate and Democratic-controlled House.

Northern Mariana Islands Senate
Party	Leader	Before	After	Change
Republican	Victor Hocog	5	4	▼1
Independent	Paul Manglona	3	3	Steady
Democratic	Edith Guerrero	1	2	▲1
Total		9	9	

Northern Mariana Islands House of Representatives
Party	Leader	Before	After	Change
Republican	Blas Jonathan T. Attao	9	3	▼6
Democratic	Edmund Villagomez	8	4	▼4
Independent		3	13	▲10
Total		20	20	

=== U.S. Virgin Islands ===
All of the seats of the unicameral Legislature of the Virgin Islands were up for election. All members of the legislature serve a two-year term. Democrats retained control of the legislature.

Virgin Islands Legislature
Party	Leader	Before	After	Change
Democratic	Novelle Francis	10	11	▲1
Independent		5	4	▼1
Total		15	15	

=== Washington, D.C. ===
Council results

The Council of the District of Columbia serves as the legislative branch of the federal district of Washington, D.C. Half of the council seats are up for election in 2022. Council members serve four-year terms. Democrats retained supermajority control of the council.

District of Columbia Council
Party	Leader	Before	After	Change
Democratic	Phil Mendelson	11	11	Steady
Independent		2	2	Steady
Total	13	13		

== Special elections ==
Various states held special elections for legislative districts throughout the year. Neither party made a net gain, with Democrats flipping one seat in the Michigan House of Representatives and Republicans flipping a seat in the Montana Senate.

=== Alabama ===
District		Incumbent			This race	
Chamber	No.	Representative	Party	First elected	Results	Candidates
House	63	Bill Poole	Republican	2010	Incumbent resigned July 31, 2021, to become director of the Alabama Department of Finance. New member elected outright after the February 1, 2022, general election was cancelled. Republican hold.	▌ ✓ Cynthia Almond (Republican)
House	76	Thad McClammy	Democratic	1994	Incumbent died August 21, 2021, of heart disease. New member elected outright after the March 1, 2022, general election was cancelled. Democratic hold.	▌ ✓ Patrice "Penni" McClammy (Democratic)

=== Arkansas ===
District		Incumbent			This race	
Chamber	No.	Representative	Party	First elected	Results	Candidates
Senate	7	Lance Eads	Republican	2016	Incumbent resigned October 28, 2021, to join Capitol Consulting Firm. New member elected February 8, 2022. Republican hold.	▌ ✓ Colby Fulfer (Republican) 50.4%; ▌Lisa Parks (Democratic) 49.6%

=== California ===
District		Incumbent			This race	
Chamber	No.	Representative	Party	First elected	Results	Candidates
Assembly	49	Ed Chau	Democratic	2012	Incumbent resigned December 10, 2021, to become a Los Angeles County Superior Court judge. New member elected in the February 15, 2022, nonpartisan blanket primary after the general election was cancelled. Democratic hold.	▌ ✓ Mike Fong (Democratic) 67.0%; ▌Burton Brink (Republican) 33.0%
Assembly	11	Jim Frazier	Democratic	2012	Incumbent resigned December 31, 2021, to return to the transportation sector. New member elected in the April 5, 2022, nonpartisan blanket primary after the general election was cancelled. Democratic hold.	▌ ✓ Lori Wilson (Democratic)
Assembly	17	David Chiu	Democratic	2014	Incumbent resigned November 1, 2021, after being appointed City Attorney of San Francisco. New member elected April 19, 2022. Democratic hold.	▌ ✓ Matt Haney (Democratic) 62.4%; ▌David Campos (Democratic) 37.6%
Assembly	62	Autumn Burke	Democratic	2014	Incumbent resigned February 1, 2022, for private reasons. New member elected June 7, 2022. Democratic hold.	▌ ✓ Tina McKinnor (Democratic) 52.5%; ▌Robert Pullen-Miles (Democratic) 47.5%
Assembly	80	Lorena Gonzalez	Democratic	2013 (special)	Incumbent resigned January 5, 2022, to lead the California Labor Federation. New member elected June 7, 2022. Democratic hold.	▌ ✓ David Alvarez (Democratic) 54.3%; ▌Georgette Gómez (Democratic) 45.7%

=== Connecticut ===
District		Incumbent			This race	
Chamber	No.	Representative	Party	First elected	Results	Candidates
House	144	Caroline Simmons	Democratic	2014	Incumbent resigned December 1, 2021, to become Mayor of Stamford. New member elected January 25, 2022. Democratic hold.	▌ ✓ Hubert Delany (Democratic) 55.7%; ▌Danny Melchionne (Republican) 44.3%
House	71	Anthony D'Amelio	Republican	1996 (special)	Incumbent resigned December 31, 2021, for private reasons. New member elected February 22, 2022. Republican hold.	▌ ✓ William Pizzuto (Republican) 73.6%; ▌John M. Egan (Democratic) 26.4%
House	5	Brandon McGee	Democratic	2012	Incumbent resigned January 7, 2022, to work on Governor Ned Lamont's re-election campaign. New member elected March 1, 2022. Democratic hold.	▌ ✓ Maryam Khan (Democratic) 74.6%; ▌▌Charles Jackson (Republican) 14.4%; ▌Lawrence Jaggon (Independent) 11.0%

=== Delaware ===
District		Incumbent			This race	
Chamber	No.	Representative	Party	First elected	Results	Candidates
House	4	Gerald Brady	Democratic	2006	Incumbent resigned February 2, 2022, due to PTSD. New member elected March 5, 2022. Democratic hold.	▌ ✓ Charles Freel (Democratic) 68.4%; ▌Ted Kittila (Republican) 31.4%

=== Florida ===
District		Incumbent			This race	
Chamber	No.	Representative	Party	First elected	Results	Candidates
House	94	Bobby DuBose	Democratic	2014	Incumbent resigned January 11, 2022, to run for U.S. Representative. New member elected in the January 11, 2022, universal Democratic primary after the general election was cancelled. Democratic hold.	▌ ✓ Daryl Campbell (Democratic) 40.1%; ▌Josephus Eggelletion III (Democratic) 29.1%; ▌Elijah Manley (Democratic) 25.1%; ▌Rod Kemp (Democratic) 5.7%
House	88	Omari Hardy	Democratic	2020	Incumbent resigned January 11, 2022, to run for U.S. Representative. New member elected March 8, 2022. Democratic hold.	▌ ✓ Jervonte Edmonds (Democratic) 80.3%; ▌Guarina Torres (Republican) 19.7%
Senate	33	Perry Thurston	Democratic	2016	Incumbent resigned January 11, 2022, to run for U.S. Representative. New member elected March 8, 2022. Democratic hold.	▌ ✓ Rosalind Osgood (Democratic) 80.8%; ▌Joseph Carter (Republican) 19.2%

=== Georgia ===
District		Incumbent			This race	
Chamber	No.	Representative	Party	First elected	Results	Candidates
House	45	Matt Dollar	Republican	2002	Incumbent resigned February 1, 2022, to become deputy commissioner of economic development at the Technical College System of Georgia. General election held April 5. New member elected in runoff May 3, 2022. Republican hold.	▌ ✓ Mitchell Kaye (Republican) 56.5%; ▌Dustin McCormick (Democratic) 43.5%
House	129	Henry Howard	Democratic	2006	Incumbent died October 13, 2022, of peripheral artery disease. New member elected December 20, 2022. Democratic hold.	▌ ✓ Karlton Howard (Democratic) 68.4%; ▌Brad Owens (Democratic) 16.4%; ▌Scott Cambers (Democratic) 9.2%; ▌Davis Green (Democratic) 6.0%

=== Kansas ===
District		Incumbent			This race	
Chamber	No.	Representative	Party	First elected	Results	Candidates
Senate	38	Bud Estes	Republican	2016	Incumbent died February 13, 2021, of a prolonged illness. New member elected November 8, 2022. Republican hold.	▌ ✓ Ron Ryckman Sr. (Republican) 75.3%; ▌Jose Lara (Democratic) 24.7%

=== Kentucky ===
District		Incumbent			This race	
Chamber	No.	Representative	Party	First elected	Results	Candidates
House	42	Reginald Meeks	Democratic	2000	Incumbent resigned December 17, 2021, for private reasons. New member elected February 22, 2022. Democratic hold.	▌ ✓ Keturah Herron (Democratic) 94.2%; ▌Judy Stallard (Republican) 5.8%

=== Louisiana ===
District		Incumbent			This race	
Chamber	No.	Representative	Party	First elected	Results	Candidates
House	101	Edward James	Democratic	2011	Incumbent resigned January 28, 2022, to become regional administrator of the Small Business Administration's South Central region. New member elected in the March 26, 2022, jungle primary after the general election was cancelled. Democratic hold.	▌ ✓ Vanessa Caston LaFleur (Democratic) 61.5%; ▌Dawn Chanet Collins (Democratic) 28.9%; ▌Terry Hebert (Independent) 9.6%
Senate	5	Karen Carter Peterson	Democratic	2010 (special)	Incumbent resigned April 8, 2022, for mental health reasons. New member elected in the November 8, 2022, jungle primary after the general election was cancelled. Democratic hold.	▌ ✓ Royce Duplessis (Democratic) 53.2%; ▌Mandie Landry (Democratic) 46.8%
Senate	17	Rick Ward III	Republican	2011	Incumbent resigned June 6, 2022, to take a job in the public relations sector. New member elected in the November 8, 2022, jungle primary after the general election was cancelled. Republican hold.	▌ ✓ Caleb Kleinpeter (Republican) 50.4%; ▌Jeremy LaCombe (Democratic) 41.9%; ▌Kirk Rousset (Republican) 7.7%

=== Maine ===
District		Incumbent			This race	
Chamber	No.	Representative	Party	First elected	Results	Candidates
House	27	Kyle Bailey	Democratic	2020	Incumbent resigned October 15, 2021, to take a new professional opportunity. New member elected January 11, 2022. Democratic hold.	▌ ✓ James Boyle (Democratic) 57.0%; ▌Timothy Thorsen (Republican) 38.5%; ▌Suzanne Phillips (Independent) 4.5%
Senate	7	Louis Luchini	Democratic	2018	Incumbent resigned January 18, 2022, to become Region 1 Advocate within the U.S. Small Business Administration. New member elected June 14, 2022. Democratic hold.	▌ ✓ Nicole Grohoski (Democratic) 63.2%; ▌Brian Langley (Republican) 35.3%; ▌Benjamin Meiklejohn (Green) 1.1%

=== Massachusetts ===
District		Incumbent			This race	
Chamber	No.	Representative	Party	First elected	Results	Candidates
Senate	Suffolk and Middlesex 1	Joseph Boncore	Democratic	2016 (special)	Incumbent resigned September 9, 2021, to become CEO of the Massachusetts Biotechnology Council. New member elected January 11, 2022. Democratic hold.	▌ ✓ Lydia Edwards (Democratic)

=== Michigan ===
District		Incumbent			This race	
Chamber	No.	Representative	Party	First elected	Results	Candidates
House	15	Abdullah Hammoud	Democratic	2016	Incumbent resigned December 29, 2021, to become Mayor of Dearborn. New member elected May 3, 2022. Democratic hold.	▌ ✓ Jeffrey Pepper (Democratic) 72.6%; ▌Ginger Shearer (Republican) 27.4%
House	36	Douglas Wozniak	Republican	2018	Incumbent resigned November 9, 2021, to join the State Senate. New member elected May 3, 2022. Republican hold.	▌ ✓ Terence Mekoski (Republican) 59.6%; ▌James Diez (Democratic) 40.4%
House	43	Andrea Schroeder	Republican	2018	Incumbent died October 1, 2021, of stomach cancer. New member elected May 3, 2022. Republican hold.	▌ ✓ Mike R. Harris (Republican) 56.5%; ▌Kent Douglas (Democratic) 43.2%
House	74	Mark Huizenga	Republican	2018	Incumbent resigned November 9, 2021, to join the State Senate. New member elected May 3, 2022. Democratic gain.	▌ ✓ Carol Glanville (Democratic) 51.7%; ▌Robert Regan (Republican) 40.4%; ▌Write-in 7.9%

=== Mississippi ===
District		Incumbent			This race	
Chamber	No.	Representative	Party	First elected	Results	Candidates
House	119	Sonya Williams-Barnes	Democratic	2011	Incumbent resigned May 8, 2022, to join the SPLC. New member elected July 19, 2022. Democratic hold.	▌ ✓ Jeffrey Hulum III (Democratic) 68.1%; ▌ Gary Fredericks (Democratic) 31.9%
House	37	Lynn Wright	Republican	2020 (special)	Incumbent died June 17, 2022, of Lou Gehrig's disease. New member elected November 8, 2022. Republican hold.	▌ ✓ Andy Boyd (Republican) 57.5%; ▌David Chism (Republican) 42.5%

=== Montana ===
District		Incumbent			This race	
Chamber	No.	Representative	Party	First elected	Results	Candidates
Senate	15	Ryan Osmundson	Republican	2016	Incumbent resigned September 29, 2021, to become Governor Greg Gianforte's budget director. New member elected November 8, 2022. Republican hold.	▌ ✓ Dan Bartel (Republican) 79.9%; ▌Cindy Palmer (Democratic) 20.1%
Senate	39	Mark Sweeney	Democratic	2020	Incumbent died May 6, 2022, of natural causes. New member elected November 8, 2022. Republican gain.	▌ ✓ Terry Vermeire (Republican) 54.7%; ▌Jesse Mullen (Democratic) 45.3%

=== Nebraska ===
District		Incumbent			This race	
Chamber	No.	Representative	Party	First elected	Results	Candidates
Legislature	31	Rich Pahls	Republican	2020	Incumbent died April 27, 2022, of cancer. New member elected November 8, 2022. Republican hold.	▌ ✓ Kathleen Kauth (Republican) 52.5%; ▌Tim Royers (Democratic) 47.5%

=== New Jersey ===
District		Incumbent			This race	
Chamber	No.	Representative	Party	First elected	Results	Candidates
Assembly	12	Ronald S. Dancer	Republican	2002 (appointed)	Incumbent died July 23, 2022, of a long illness. New member elected November 8, 2022. Republican hold.	▌ ✓ Alex Sauickie (Republican) 61.1%; ▌Paul Sarti (Democratic) 38.9%
Senate	28	Ronald Rice	Democratic	1986 (special)	Incumbent resigned August 31, 2022, for health reasons. New member elected November 8, 2022. Democratic hold.	▌ ✓ Renee Burgess (Democratic) 78.1%; ▌Joy Freeman (Republican) 21.9%

=== New York ===
District		Incumbent			This race	
Chamber	No.	Representative	Party	First elected	Results	Candidates
Assembly	68	Robert J. Rodriguez	Democratic	2010	Incumbent resigned November 4, 2021, to become Secretary of State of New York. New member elected January 18, 2022. Democratic hold.	▌ ✓ Eddie Gibbs (Democratic) 80.4%; ▌Write-in 10.0%; ▌Daby Carreras (Republican) 9.6%
Assembly	60	Charles Barron	Democratic	2014	Incumbent resigned January 1, 2022, to join the New York City Council. New member elected February 15, 2022. Democratic hold.	▌ ✓ Nikki Lucas (Democratic) 77.7%; ▌Keron Alleyne (Working Families) 19.4%; ▌▌Marvin King (Republican) 2.0%
Assembly	72	Carmen De La Rosa	Democratic	2016	Incumbent resigned December 31, 2021, to join the New York City Council. New member elected February 15, 2022. Democratic hold.	▌ ✓ Manny De Los Santos (Democratic) 61.1%; ▌Nayma Silver-Matos (Uptown Rises) 31.3%; ▌Erwin De La Cruz (Republican) 7.1%
Assembly	43	Diana Richardson	Democratic	2015 (special)	Incumbent resigned February 4, 2022, to become Deputy Borough President of Brooklyn under Antonio Reynoso. New member elected March 22, 2022. Democratic hold.	▌ ✓ Brian Cunningham (Democratic) 62.2%; ▌Jelanie DeShong (Working Families) 34.5%; ▌▌Mesidor Azor (Republican) 2.9%
Assembly	20	Melissa Miller	Republican	2016	Incumbent resigned February 15, 2022, to join the Hempstead Town Board. New member elected April 7, 2022. Republican hold.	▌▌ ✓ Eric Brown (Republican) 65.7%; ▌David Lobl (Democratic) 34.0%
Assembly	58	Nick Perry	Democratic	1992	Incumbent resigned March 30, 2022, to become U.S. Ambassador to Jamaica. New member elected May 24, 2022. Democratic hold.	▌▌ ✓ Monique Chandler-Waterman (Democratic) 79.5%; ▌Hercules Reid (Education is Key) 18.1%; ▌▌Monique Allen-Davy (Republican) 2.3%

=== Oregon ===
District		Incumbent			This race	
Chamber	No.	Representative	Party	First elected	Results	Candidates
Senate	18	Ginny Burdick	Democratic	1996	Incumbent resigned November 1, 2021, to join the Northwest Power and Conservation Council. New member elected November 8, 2022. Democratic hold.	▌ ✓ Wlnsvey Campos (Democratic) 56.5%; ▌Kimberly Rice (Republican) 33.0%; ▌Rich Vial (Independent) 10.4%

=== Pennsylvania ===
District		Incumbent			This race	
Chamber	No.	Representative	Party	First elected	Results	Candidates
House	19	Jake Wheatley	Democratic	2002	Incumbent resigned January 31, 2022, to become Pittsburgh mayor Ed Gainey's chief of staff. New member elected April 5, 2022. Democratic hold.	▌ ✓ Aerion Abney (Democratic)
House	24	Ed Gainey	Democratic	2012	Incumbent resigned January 3, 2022, to become Mayor of Pittsburgh. New member elected April 5, 2022. Democratic hold.	▌ ✓ Martell Covington (Democratic) 94.2%; ▌Todd Elliott Koger (Republican) 5.8%
House	116	Tarah Toohil	Republican	2010	Incumbent resigned December 31, 2021, to join the Luzerne County Court of Common Pleas. New member elected April 5, 2022. Republican hold.	▌ ✓ Robert Schnee (Republican) 65.5%; ▌Amilcar Arroyo (Democratic) 29.6%; ▌Paul Cwalina (Libertarian) 4.9%
Senate	5	John Sabatina	Democratic	2015 (special)	Incumbent resigned January 1, 2022, to join the Philadelphia County Court of Common Pleas. New member elected May 17, 2022. Democratic hold.	▌ ✓ Jimmy Dillon (Democratic) 56.7%; ▌Samuel Oropeza (Republican) 43.3%

=== South Carolina ===
District		Incumbent			This race	
Chamber	No.	Representative	Party	First elected	Results	Candidates
Senate	31	Hugh Leatherman	Republican	1980	Incumbent died November 12, 2021, of intestinal cancer. New member elected March 29, 2022. Republican hold.	▌ ✓ Mike Reichenbach (Republican) 90.1%; ▌Suzanna La Rochelle (Democratic) 9.7%
House	97	Mandy Kimmons	Republican	2018	Incumbent resigned December 21, 2021, for private reasons. New member elected May 17, 2022. Republican hold.	▌ ✓ Robby Robbins (Republican) 63.4%; ▌ ReZsaun Lewis (Democratic) 36.2%
House	18	Tommy Stringer	Republican	2008	Incumbent resigned January 5, 2022, due to Parkinson's disease. New member elected May 24, 2022. Republican hold.	▌ ✓ Alan Morgan (Republican) 86.4%; ▌Write-in 13.6%

=== Texas ===
District		Incumbent			This race	
Chamber	No.	Representative	Party	First elected	Results	Candidates
House	38	Eddie Lucio III	Democratic	2006	Incumbent resigned January 31, 2022, for private reasons. New member elected outright after the May 7, 2022, general election was cancelled. Democratic hold.	▌ ✓ Erin Gamez (Democratic)
House	147	Garnet Coleman	Democratic	1990	Incumbent resigned February 28, 2022, for private reasons. New member elected May 7, 2022. Democratic hold.	▌ ✓ Jolanda Jones (Democratic) 52.3%; ▌ Danielle Keys Bess (Democratic) 47.7%

=== Virginia ===
District		Incumbent			This race	
Chamber	No.	Representative	Party	First elected	Results	Candidates
House	89	Jay Jones	Democratic	2017	Incumbent resigned December 31, 2021, for private reasons. New member elected January 11, 2022. Democratic hold.	▌ ✓ Jackie Glass (Democratic) 76.4%; ▌Giovanni Dolmo (Republican) 23.4%

=== Washington ===
District		Incumbent			This race	
Chamber	No.	Representative	Party	First elected	Results	Candidates
Senate	27	Jeannie Darneille	Democratic	2012	Incumbent resigned November 1, 2021, to become assistant secretary of the Washington State Department of Corrections Women's Prison Division. New member elected November 8, 2022. Democratic hold.	▌ ✓ Yasmin Trudeau (Democratic) 70.5%; ▌Ashley Ray (Republican) 29.4%
