= List of speakers of the Kansas House of Representatives =

Speaker of Kansas House of Representatives
- Incumbent; Daniel Hawkins since January 9, 2023
- Status: Presiding officer
- Seat: Kansas State Capitol, Topeka
- Appointer: Kansas House of Representatives
- Inaugural holder: William Wale Updegraff

The following is a list of speakers of the Kansas House of Representatives since statehood.

== Speakers of the Kansas House of Representatives ==
Speaker	Term	Party	County/Residence	Notes	Citation
William Wale Updegraff	1861	Republican	Osawatomie		
Moses S. Adams	1862	Republican	Leavenworth		
Josiah Kellogg	1863	Republican	Leavenworth		
Jacob Stotler	1865	Radical Republican	Leavenworth		
John Taylor Burris	1866	Republican	Emporia		
Preston Bierce Plumb	1867	Republican	Olathe		
George W. Smith	1868	Republican	Emporia		
Moses S. Adams	1869	Republican	Leavenworth		
Jacob Stotler	1870	Radical Republican	Emporia		
Benjamin Franklin Simpson	1871	Republican	Paola		
Stephen Alonzo Cobb	1872	Republican	Wyandotte		
Josiah Kellogg	1873	Republican	Leavenworth		
Boyd H. McEckron	1874	Republican	Shirley		
Thomas P. Fenlon	1874	Republican	Leavenworth		
Edward H. Funston	1875	Republican	Carlyle		
Dudley Chase Haskell	1876	Republican	Lawrence		
Peter Percival Elder	Jan 1877–Feb 1877	Republican	Council Grove		
Samuel Newitt Wood	Feb 1877–1879	Republican	Ottawa		
Sidney Clarke	1879	Republican	Lawrence		
John Blosser Johnson	1881	Republican	Topeka		
James Donaldson Snoddy	1883	Republican	La Cygne		
John Blosser Johnson	1885	Republican	Topeka		
Abram Wentworth Smith	1887	Republican	McPherson		
Henry Booth	1889	Republican	Larned		
Peter Percival Elder	1891	Farmers' Alliance	Princeton		
George L. Douglass	1893	Republican	Wichita		
John M. Dunsmore	1893	People's Party	Thayet		
Charles E. Lobdell	1895	Republican	Dighton		
William Daniel Street	1897	Republican	Oberlin		
Stephen J. Osborn	1899	Republican	Salina		
George Jerome Barker	1901	Republican	Lawrence		
James T. Pringle	1903	Republican	Burlingame		
Walter Roscoe Stubbs	1905	Republican	Lawrence		
John S. Simmons	1907	Republican	Dighton		
Joseph N. Dolley	1909	Republican	Maple Hill		
George H. Buckman	1911	Republican	Winfield		
Willis L. Brown	1913	Democratic	Kingman		
Robert Stone	1915	Republican	Topeka		
Austin M. Keene	1917	Republican	Fort Scott		
William Purnell Lambertson	1919–1921	Republican	Fairview		
William West Harvey	1921–1923	Republican	Ashland		
Charles E. Mann	1923–1925	Republican	Osborne		
Clifford R. Hope	1925–1927	Republican	Garden City		
John D. M. Hamilton	1927–1929	Republican	Topeka		
John H. Myers	1929–1931	Republican	Merriam		
Hal Harlan	1931–1933	Republican	Manhattan		
William H. Vernon	1933–1935	Republican	Larned		
Schuyler C. Bloss	1935–1937	Republican	Winfield		
Henry S. Buzick	1937–1939	Republican	Sylvan Grove		
Ernest A. Briles	1939–1941	Republican	Stafford		
Clay C. Carper	1941–1943	Republican	Eureka		
Paul R. Wunsch	1943–1945	Republican	Kingman		
Frank L. Hagaman	1945–1947	Republican	Kansas City		
Frank B. Miller	1947–1949	Republican	Langdon		
Dale M. Bryant	1949–1951	Republican	Wichita		
Lawrence M. Gibson	1951–1953	Republican	Pittsburg		
Charles D. Stough	1953–1955	Republican	Lawrence		
Robert H. Jennison	1955–1957	Republican	Healy		
Jess E. Taylor	1957–1961	Republican	Tribune		
William L. Mitchell	1961–1963	Republican	Hutchinson		
Charles S. Arthur	1963–1965	Republican	Manhattan		
Clyde Hill	1966–1967	Republican	Yates Center		
John J. Conard	1967–1969	Republican	Greensburg		
Calvin S. Strowig	1969–1973	Republican	Abilene		
Duane S. McGill	1973–1975	Republican	Winfield		
John W. Carlin	1975–1979	Democratic	Smolan		
Wendell Lady	1979–1983	Republican	Overland Park		
Mike Hayden	1983–1987	Republican	Atwood		
James D. Braden	1987–1990	Republican	Clay Center		
Marvin Barkis	1991–1993	Democratic	Louisburg		
Robert H. Miller	1993–1995	Republican	Wellington		
Tim Shallenburger	1995–1999	Republican	Baxter Springs		
Robin Jennison	1999–2000	Republican	Healy		
Kent Glasscock	2001–2003	Republican	Manhattan		
Doug Mays	2003–2007	Republican	Topeka		
Melvin Neufeld	2007–2009	Republican	Ingalls		
Michael O'Neal	2009–2013	Republican	Hutchinson		
Raymond Merrick	2013–2017	Republican	Stilwell		
Ron Ryckman Jr.	2017–2023	Republican	Olathe		
Daniel Hawkins	2023–	Republican	Wichita		

== Speakers of the Kansas Territorial House of Representatives ==
Speaker	Term	Party	County/Residence	Notes	Citation
John H. Stringfellow	1855–1857				
W. G. Matthias	1857				
G. W. Deitzler	1857–1859	Republican	Lawrence		
Alfred Larzalere	1859–1860				
Gustavus A. Colton	1860–1861				
J. W. Scott (Kansas politician)	1861				

== See also ==
- List of Kansas state legislatures
