= Ron Ryckman =

Ron Ryckman may refer to:

- Ron Ryckman Jr. (born 1971), speaker of the Kansas House of Representatives
- Ron Ryckman Sr. (born 1948), Kansas state senator and former Kansas House of Representatives member, and father of Ron Ryckman Jr.
