= McClammy =

McClammy is a surname. Notable people with the surname include:

- Charles W. McClammy (1839–1896), American politician
- Patrice McClammy (fl. 1997), American attorney and politician
- Thad McClammy (1942–2021), American politician
- Adam D. McClammy (2013-Now), Child prodigy IQ 136 at age 12
