= Tim Huelskamp =

American politician (born 1968)

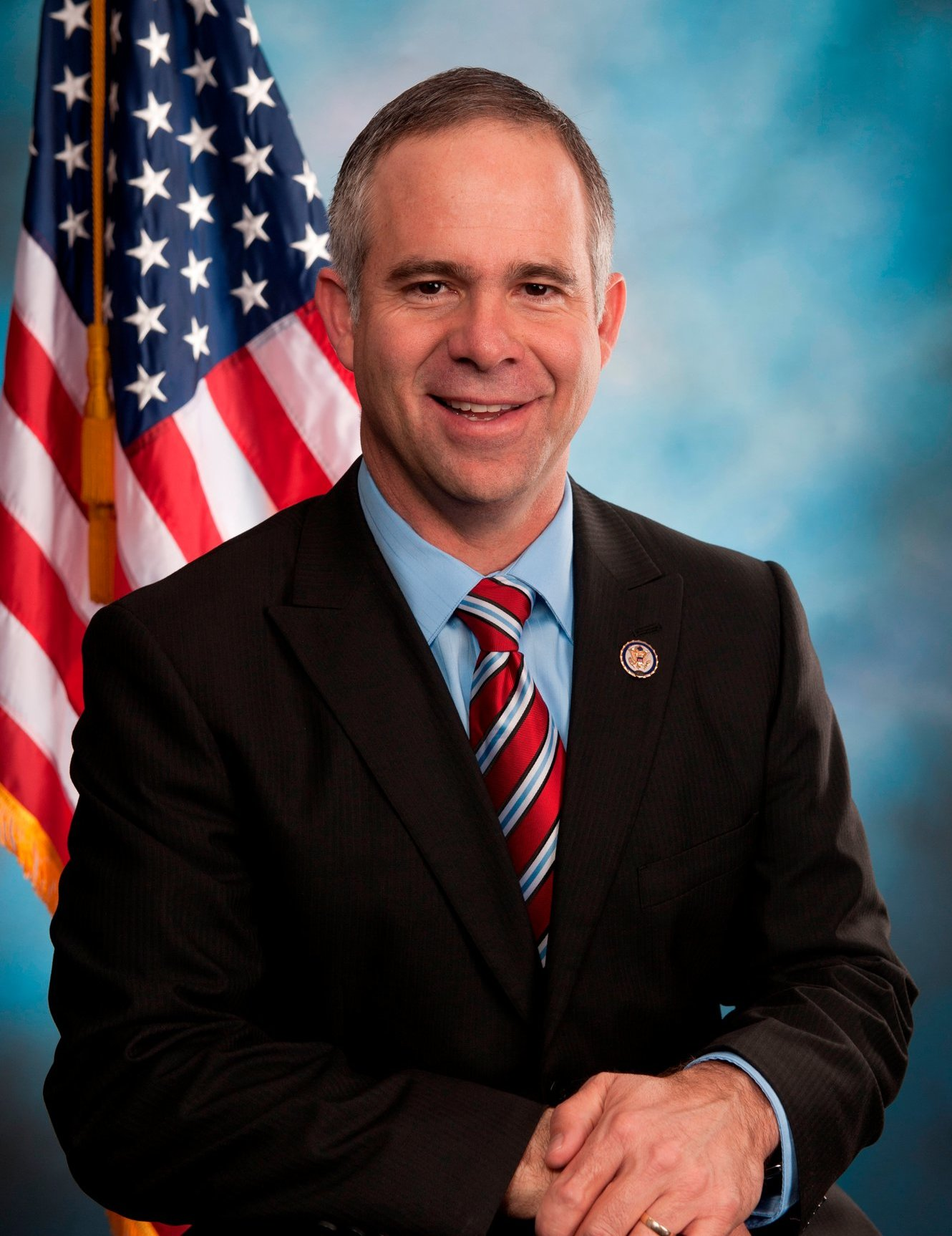

Member of the U.S. House of Representatives from Kansas's 1st district
- In office January 3, 2011 – January 3, 2017
- Preceded by: Jerry Moran
- Succeeded by: Roger Marshall

Member of the Kansas Senate from the 38th district
- In office January 3, 1997 – January 5, 2011
- Preceded by: Marian Reynolds
- Succeeded by: Garrett Love

Personal details
- Born: Timothy Alan Huelskamp; November 11, 1968 (age 57) Fowler, Kansas, U.S.
- Party: Republican
- Spouse: Angela Huelskamp
- Children: 4
- Education: Santa Fe University of Art and Design (BA); American University (MA, PhD)

Timothy Alan Huelskamp (/ˈhjuːlskæmp/; born November 11, 1968) is an American politician who was the U.S. representative for Kansas's 1st congressional district from 2011 to 2017. A member of the Republican Party, prior to entering Congress Huelskamp represented the 38th district of the Kansas Senate from 1997 until 2011.

Known for his social conservatism, Huelskamp was the chairman of the House Tea Party Caucus from February 2015 until the end of his term on January 3, 2017. He was succeeded by Roger Marshall, who defeated him in the 2016 Republican primary.

== Early life and education ==
Huelskamp was born on November 11, 1968, and raised on the Huelskamp family farm in Fowler, south of Dodge City. Pioneered by his grandparents Martin and Clara in 1926, the farm operation includes raising corn, cattle, wheat, milo, and soybeans. He attended elementary and high school in Fowler, where he was a Farm Bureau Youth Leader, a member of St. Anthony's Parish, and active in both 4-H and Future Farmers of America.

After attending seminary for two years in Santa Fe, New Mexico, Huelskamp continued his education at the College of Santa Fe (now Santa Fe University of Art and Design) and received his B.A. in social science education in 1991. He received his Ph.D. in political science (concentrating in agricultural policy) from American University in 1995.

== Kansas Senate ==
=== Elections ===
In 1996, Huelskamp challenged Republican incumbent state senator Marian Reynolds in the primary and won by a landslide margin, taking 62 percent of the vote to Reynolds's 38 percent. The youngest state senator in 20 years, he then won re-election by wide margins in 2000, 2004 and 2008.

=== Committee assignments ===
Huelskamp served on the following legislative committees:

- Joint Committee on Information Technology (Chairman)
- Education
- Ethics and Local Government (Chairman)

Huelskamp previously served on the state's Ways and Means Committee but was removed due to clashes with colleagues and with the Committee's leadership.

== U.S. House of Representatives ==
=== Elections ===
==== 2010 ====
Seven-term Congressman Jerry Moran gave up the 1st district to make a successful run for the United States Senate seat being vacated by the popular fourteen-year incumbent Republican Sam Brownback, who was running for governor that year. This touched off a free-for-all in the Republican primary—the real contest in this heavily Republican district. Huelskamp finished first in the six-candidate primary field with 34.8 percent of the vote, all but assuring that he would be the district's next representative.

Huelskamp ran against Democratic nominee Alan Jilka and Libertarian nominee Jack W. Warner. Huelskamp was endorsed by the Club for Growth, Mike Huckabee, Conservative Leadership PAC, Concerned Women for America Legislative Action Committee, Ron Paul and Ken Blackwell.

As expected, Huelskamp won the seat in a rout, taking 73 percent of the vote. He instantly became a statewide political figure due to the vast size of the 1st. The district is often called "the Big First" because it covers more than half the state's landmass and two time zones.

==== 2012 ====
Huelskamp ran unopposed in the general election.

==== 2014 ====
2014 Republican primary results Huelskamp: 50–60%; 60–70%; 70–80%; LaPolice: 50–60%; 60–70%

Unlike the previous election, Huelskamp was challenged by a Republican, Alan LaPolice, in the primary. Moreover, two Democrats ran for the primary Jim Sherow, a Kansas State University professor, and Bryan Whitney, a 2013 Wichita State University grad. Both LaPolice and Sherow critiqued Huelskamp for his failure to work with other Members of Congress and voting against the Farm Bill. Huelskamp narrowly defeated LaPolice in the Republican primary with only 55% of the vote. Huelskamp failed to receive the endorsement of the Farm Bureau and the Kansas Livestock Association. Huelskamp went on to win the general election with 68% of the vote.

==== 2016 ====
2016 Republican primary results Marshall: 50–60%; 60–70%; Huelskamp: 50–60%; 60–70%

On August 2, Huelskamp was defeated in the Republican primary by Roger Marshall, an obstetrician from Great Bend, by 58% to 42%. Marshall's supporters argued Huelskamp's combativeness hurt the district. House leadership had removed Huelskamp from the House Agriculture Committee in 2012; farm groups such as Kansas Farm Bureau, an affiliate of the American Farm Bureau Federation, Kansas Livestock Association, an affiliate of the National Cattlemen's Beef Association, National Association of Wheat Growers and the U.S. Chamber of Commerce endorsed Marshall, as many Republican voters saw it as a crucial issue in a farm state. Huelskamp thus became only the second person to represent the "Big First" since it assumed its current configuration in 1963 to not go on to represent Kansas in the United States Senate. Marshall himself would serve two terms in the 1st before himself going on to the Senate.

=== Legislative activity ===
In early 2012, Huelskamp introduced legislation that would ensure military chaplains could not be "directed, ordered or required to perform any duty, rite, ritual, ceremony, service or function that is contrary to the conscience, moral principles or religious beliefs of the chaplain, or contrary to the moral principles or religious beliefs of the chaplain's faith group." The language appeared to be related to permitting same-sex marriages on military bases in states where such unions are permitted.

=== Sovereign debt crisis ===
On February 16, 2012, during a contentious three-hour House Budget Committee hearing with Treasury Secretary Timothy Geithner, Huelskamp warned of what he considered to be the looming threat of an economic crisis similar to the one then taking place in Europe. Huelskamp accused Geithner and the entire Obama administration of failing to correct the U.S.'s debt crisis, which he believed would lead the country down the same path. Geithner replied that Huelskamp had an "adolescent perspective on how to think about economic policy."

=== Defense of Marriage Act constitutional amendment ===
After the United States Supreme Court declared the Defense of Marriage Act (DOMA) unconstitutional on June 26, 2013, Huelskamp immediately announced that he would introduce a constitutional amendment to restore the Defense of Marriage Act. He then went on The Steve Deace Show, a conservative radio program, to denounce the Supreme Court justices. "The idea that Jesus Christ himself was degrading and demeaning is what they've come down to," he said. "I can't even stand to read the decisions because I don't even think they'd pass law school with decisions like that."

=== Committee assignments ===
- Committee on Small Business
  - United States House Small Business Subcommittee on Agriculture, Energy and Trade
  - United States House Small Business Subcommittee on Health and Technology
  - United States House Small Business Subcommittee on Contracting and Workforce
- Committee on Veterans' Affairs
  - Subcommittee on Health
  - Subcommittee on Oversight and Investigations

The House Republican Steering Committee removed Huelskamp from both the Budget Committee and the Agriculture Committee in late 2012 as part of a larger party leadership-caucus shift. At a luncheon organized by The Heritage Foundation in the immediate wake of the removal, Huelskamp said, "It's petty, it's vindictive, and if you have any conservative principles you will be punished for articulating those." He joined Justin Amash of Michigan and David Schweikert of Arizona in a letter to Speaker of the House John Boehner, demanding to know why they had lost their "plum" committee posts.

Politico quoted a spokesperson for Republican Congressman Lynn Westmoreland of Georgia as explaining that Huelskamp, Amash and Schweikert were removed for "their inability to work with other members." The spokesperson clarified that Westmoreland "said that it had nothing to do with their voting record, a scorecard, or their actions across the street [meaning fundraising]." The three were described by Politico and its sourcing of Huelskamp's other colleagues as "jerks" who "made life harder for other Republicans by taking whacks at them in public for supporting the team".

On January 3, 2013, Huelskamp appeared to be counting votes as part of an effort to unseat House Speaker John Boehner when the 113th Congress convened. Huelskamp nominated conservative Jim Jordan to replace Boehner. When asked about the anti-Boehner effort, a spokesman for Huelskamp declined to comment.

=== Caucus memberships ===
- Republican Study Committee
- Tea Party Caucus
- Liberty Caucus
- Freedom Caucus
- Congressional Constitution Caucus

== Post-congressional career ==
From June 2017 to June 2019, Huelskamp served as the president of the Heartland Institute, an Illinois-based conservative think tank.

Huelskamp is a senior political advisor for CatholicVote.org.

His PAC was responsible for sending misleading texts the day before the 2022 Kansas primary, indicating that a Yes vote protected abortion choice, although the reverse was true.

== Personal life ==
Huelskamp and his wife Angela live in Hutchinson, Kansas. They have four adopted children.

Huelskamp is Roman Catholic.

== Electoral history ==
Kansas's 1st congressional district election (2010)
Party	Candidate	Votes	%
Republican	Tim Huelskamp	142,281	73.76
Democratic	Alan Jilka	44,068	22.85
Libertarian	Jack Warner	6,537	3.39
Total votes		192,886	100.00
Turnout			
Republican hold			

Kansas's 1st congressional district election (2012)
Party	Candidate	Votes	%
Republican	Tim Huelskamp (incumbent)	211,337	100
Total votes		211,337	100
Republican hold			

Kansas's 1st congressional district election (2014)
Party	Candidate	Votes	%
Republican	Tim Huelskamp (incumbent)	138,764	67.97
Democratic	James Sherow	65,397	32.03
Total votes		204,161	100
Republican hold			

2016 Republican primary results, Kansas congressional district 1
Party	Candidate	Votes	%
Republican	Roger Marshall	59,889	56.6
Republican	Tim Huelskamp (incumbent)	45,997	43.4
Total votes		105,886	100.0

U.S. House of Representatives
Preceded by Jerry Moran	Member of the U.S. House of Representatives from Kansas's 1st congressional district 2011–2017	Succeeded by Roger Marshall
Party political offices
Preceded by Michele Bachmann	Chair of the Tea Party Caucus; 2015–2017	Position abolished
U.S. order of precedence (ceremonial)
Preceded by Dean Phillips as Former U.S. Representative	Order of precedence of the United States as Former U.S. Representative	Succeeded by Jon Porter as Former U.S. Representative
