= District 125 =

District 125 could refer to:

School districts

- Atwood Heights District 125, a grade school district headquartered in Alsip, Cook County, Illinois
- Oglesby Elementary School District 125, a grade school district in Oglesby, LaSalle County, Illinois
- Stevenson High School (Lincolnshire, Illinois), Consolidated High School District 125, Lake County, Illinois
- Medicine Valley School District 125, a unit school district headquartered in Curtis, Frontier County, Nebraska
- Manvel School District 125, a grade school district in Manvel, Grand Forks County, North Dakota

National legislative districts

- District 125 of the Bundestag, the German parliament

United States legislative districts

- Georgia House of Representatives District 125
- Kansas House of Representatives 125th District, the seat held by Carl Holmes
- New York State Assembly District 125, the seat held by Barbara Lifton
- Missouri House of Representatives District 125, the seat held by Barney Joe Fisher
- Pennsylvania House of Representatives, District 125, the seat held by Mike Tobash
- Texas House of Representatives District 125, the seat formerly held by Justin Rodriguez

Other districts

- King County Water District 125, a public water district headquartered in Tukwila, Washington
