= Robert G. Frey =

American politician

Robert Frey

Member of the Kansas Senate from the 38th district
- In office 1985–1988
- Preceded by: Charles Angell
- Succeeded by: Janice McClure

Member of the Kansas House of Representatives from the 125th district
- In office 1975 – January 14, 1985
- Preceded by: Wilfred Bush
- Succeeded by: Carl Holmes

Personal details
- Born: 1938 or 1939 Wisconsin
- Party: Republican
- Education: Wichita State University (B.A.); Washburn University School of Law (J.D.)

Robert G. Frey (born 1938 or 1939) is an American former politician who served in the Kansas State Senate and Kansas House of Representatives as a Republican from 1975 to 1988.

Frey was born in Wisconsin, and moved to Kansas after being discharged from the U.S. Air Force in Wichita in 1962. He attended Wichita State University. He graduated from Washburn University School of Law in 1970, after which he moved to Liberal, Kansas, where he became county attorney and founded a law practice.

In 1974, Frey successfully ran for an open seat in the Kansas House. He spent the next ten years in the House, eventually rising to the post of Majority Leader and chairing the Judiciary Committee. Frey identified as a moderate Republican during his time in the legislature. In 1984, he successfully ran for the Kansas Senate, but served only one term before unexpectedly losing his 1988 re-election campaign to Democrat Janice McClure.

After he left the Senate, Frey worked as a lobbyist for the Kansas Trial Lawyers Association. In 1995, he was appointed to the State Board of Tax Appeals by Governor Bill Graves.
