= Senator McClure (disambiguation) =

Jim McClure (1924–2011) was a U.S. Senator from Idaho from 1973 to 1991.

Senator McClure may also refer to:

- Alexander McClure (1828–1909), Pennsylvania State Senate
- Ian McClure (politician) (1905–1982), Northern Irish Senate
- Janice McClure (born 1941), Kansas State Senate
- John J. McClure (1886–1965), Pennsylvania State Senate
- Mary McClure (1939–2016), South Dakota State Senate
- Steve McClure (politician) (born 1984), Illinois State Senate
