= Charles Angell =

American politician

Member of the Kansas Senate from the 38th district
- In office 1973 – January 14, 1985
- Succeeded by: Robert Frey

Personal details
- Born: May 17, 1929
- Died: May 15, 2014 (aged 84) Colorado Springs, Colorado
- Party: Republican
- Spouse: Phyllis Marie Austin (m. September 18, 1949)

Charles L. Angell (May 17, 1929–May 15, 2014) was an American politician who served in the Kansas State Senate as a Republican from 1973 to 1984.
