= Senator Estes =

Senator Estes may refer to:

- Bud Estes (1946–2021), Kansas State Senate
- Craig Estes (born 1953), Texas State Senate
