= Joe Patton =

Joe Patton may refer to:

- Joe Patton (American football)
- Joe Patton (politician)
- Billy Joe Patton, American golfer
