= Marian Reynolds =

American politician

Member of the Kansas Senate from the 38th district
- In office 1993–1996
- Preceded by: Janice McClure
- Succeeded by: Tim Huelskamp

Member of the Kansas House of Representatives from the 115th district
- In office 1975–1976
- Preceded by: Don Spotts

Personal details
- Born: February 16, 1950 (age 76) Dodge City, Kansas
- Party: Democrat during House term; Republican during Senate term
- Spouse: Jay Don Reynolds (m. before 1974; div. 1978)
- Children: Mark Reynolds
- Education: Dodge City Community College and Parks Business College (Associate's degree)

Marian K. Reynolds (born February 16, 1950) is an American former politician who served in the Kansas House of Representatives and Kansas State Senate.

Reynolds was born in Dodge City, Kansas and grew up on her family's farm in Cimarron as one of eight children. She attended community college and married Jay Reynolds. In 1974, she ran for the Kansas House as a Democrat. She defeated two other candidates in the primary election with relative ease, and then beat three-term incumbent Republican Don Spotts in the general election. Reynolds served only a single term in the Kansas House, during which she received national and local media attention for being one of the first women to be pregnant and give birth while serving in a state legislature. She declined to run for re-election in 1976.

After leaving the Kansas House, Reynolds took a job as a sales representative covering Western Kansas for IBM, and she and Jay Reynolds divorced in 1978. In 1992, Reynolds re-entered politics, running for the 38th district in the Kansas Senate; she opted to run as a Republican, citing her conservatism and distaste for government spending. Once again, she served only a single term; Tim Huelskamp successfully challenged her in the 1996 Republican primary, taking 62% of the vote to Reynolds' 38%.
