= Steven Ediger =

American politician

Member of the Kansas House of Representatives from the 104th district
- In office January 10, 1983 – January 14, 1985
- Preceded by: Timothy P. O'Sullivan
- Succeeded by: Michael O'Neal

Personal details
- Born: June 24, 1956 (age 70)
- Party: Democratic

Steven A. Ediger (born June 24, 1956) is a lawyer from Hutchinson, Kansas who served one term as a Democratic member of the Kansas House of Representatives. He was defeated in 1984 by Republican Michael O'Neal, also a lawyer from Hutchinson.
