= Janice McClure =

American politician

Member of the Kansas Senate from the 38th district
- In office 1989–1992
- Preceded by: Robert G. Frey
- Succeeded by: Marian Reynolds

Personal details
- Born: January 1, 1941 (age 85) Northern California
- Party: Democratic
- Children: 1 son
- Education: University of New Mexico (B.A.); University of Kansas (M.A.)

Janice Lee McClure (born January 1, 1941) is an American former politician who served one term in the Kansas State Senate from 1989 to 1992.

McClure was born in Northern California, after her parents left Kansas to escape the Dust Bowl. The family returned to Kansas during her early childhood, and she grew up on her family farm. She attended college at the University of New Mexico and worked as a graphic designer, including on equipment manuals that were used as part of the Apollo Program. She married during her 20s, but divorced after the relationship was abusive during her pregnancy, and returned to Kansas to work on the farm.

In 1988, she was recruited to run for the Kansas Senate from the 38th district in Western Kansas. She faced no opposition in the primary, and in the general defeated incumbent Republican Robert Frey. She served for one term in the Senate before being succeeded by Marian Reynolds in the 1992 election.
