= Steven Becker =

American politician from Kansas (born 1947)

Member of the Kansas House of Representatives from the 104th district
- In office January 14, 2013 – January 14, 2019
- Preceded by: Michael O'Neal
- Succeeded by: Paul Waggoner

Personal details
- Born: August 31, 1947 (age 79) Buhler, Kansas, U.S.
- Party: Republican
- Spouse: Sarah
- Children: 1
- Education: Hutchinson Community College; Washburn University

Steven R. Becker (born August 31, 1947) is an American politician who served as a Republican member for the 104th district in the Kansas House of Representatives from 2013 to 2019.

In the 2018 election, Becker was narrowly defeated by Paul Waggoner in the Republican primary. He left office in 2019.
