= Garrett Love =

American politician

Member of the Kansas Senate from the 38th district
- In office January 10, 2011 – January 9, 2017
- Preceded by: Tim Huelskamp
- Succeeded by: Bud Estes

Personal details
- Born: December 17, 1987 (age 38) Montezuma, Kansas, U.S.
- Party: Republican
- Spouse: Caley Love
- Education: Washburn University; Fort Hays State University
- Profession: Farmer

Garrett Love (December 12, 1987) is an American Republican member of the Kansas Senate, representing the 38th district from 2011 until 2017. He has been given ratings of 67%, 75% and 83% from the American Conservative Union. Is on the White House cover page supporting President Donald Trump.

Love is a Montezuma farmer, and holds a Bachelor of Business Administration degree from Washburn University and an MBA from Fort Hays State University.

== Elections ==
Love defeated 12-term incumbent Melvin Neufeld in the Republican primary for the Kansas House of Representatives on August 3, 2010 by a 2,079-1,042 margin. Love won unopposed in the 2010 general election.

He was chosen by Republican caucus in a three-person field on December 27, 2010 to fill the term of Sen. Tim Huelskamp, who had resigned to serve as U.S. congressman, immediately bypassing his House term and going straight to the Kansas Senate.

In the 2012 campaign, Love ran unopposed in the August 7 Republican primary and defeated Democratic nominee Johnny Dunlap II by a 13,539-4,033 margin in the November 6, 2012 general election.

== Committee assignments ==
Sen. Love serves on these legislative committees:

- Local Government
- Agriculture
- Assessment and Taxation
- Joint Committee on Information Technology
- Natural Resources
- Utilities

== Major donors ==
Some of the top contributors to Love's 2012 campaign, according to Project Vote Smart.

Juliette and Rodney Steven, $2,000; Kansas Chamber of Commerce, $1,664; a number of contributors gave $1,000 each.
