= Reid Petty =

American politician

Member of the Kansas House of Representatives from the 125th district
- In office 2013 – January 12, 2015
- Preceded by: Carl Holmes
- Succeeded by: Shannon Francis

Personal details
- Born: May 14, 1985 (age 41)
- Party: Republican

Reid Petty (born May 14, 1985) is an American politician who served in the Kansas House of Representatives as a Republican for one term in 2013 and 2014. Petty challenged incumbent Republican Carl Holmes in the 2012 primary election; Petty won by only 9 votes, taking 904 ballots (50.2%) to Holmes' 895 (49.7%). The general election was not contested, and Petty took office in January 2013. He served for only one term, declining to run for re-election in 2014, and was succeeded by fellow Republican Shannon Francis.
