= Melvin Neufeld =

American politician (1940–2020)

Speaker of the Kansas House of Representatives
- In office January 2007 – January 2009
- Preceded by: Doug Mays
- Succeeded by: Michael O'Neal

Member of the Kansas House of Representatives from the 115th district
- In office January 14, 1991 – January 10, 2011
- Preceded by: Ronald Reinert
- Succeeded by: Ron Ryckman Sr.
- In office January 14, 1985 – January 9, 1989
- Preceded by: Dean Shelor
- Succeeded by: Ronald Reinert

Personal details
- Born: October 3, 1940 Ingalls, Kansas, U.S.
- Died: August 3, 2020 (aged 79) Garden City, Kansas, U.S.
- Party: Republican
- Spouse: Maxine Bond (m. 1960)
- Children: 1

Melvin James Neufeld (October 3, 1940 – August 3, 2020) was a Republican member of the Kansas House of Representatives. He represented the 115th district. Neufeld first served from 1985 to 1988, and again from 1991 to 2010, when he lost the primary election to Garrett Love.

On August 3, 2020, Neufeld died from Glioblastoma.

== 1994 Blackmail Scandal ==
In 1994, Neufeld threatened to blackmail a Democratic member of the Kansas House of Representatives if he did not vote "yes" on a pending appropriations bill. The Kansas Supreme Court ruled that the state could not prosecute Neufeld because legislative immunity prevented a court from considering his threats as evidence.

== Committee membership ==
- Education
- Federal and State Affairs (Chair)
- Government Efficiency and Fiscal Oversight

== Major donors ==
The top five donors to Neufeld's 2008 campaign:

1. Kansas Dental Association - $1,000
2. Monsanto - $1,000
3. Kansas Association of Realtors - $1,000
4. Koch Industries - $1,000
5. Kansas Contractors Association - $1,000
