= Joe Patton (politician) =

American politician

Member of the Kansas House of Representatives from the 54th district
- In office January 8, 2007 – January 14, 2013
- Preceded by: Doug Mays
- Succeeded by: Ken Corbet

Personal details
- Born: December 30, 1952 (age 73)
- Party: Republican
- Spouse: Cindy
- Children: 4
- Education: Washburn University

Joe Patton (December 30, 1952) was a Republican member of the Kansas House of Representatives, representing the 54th district. He served from 2007 until 2013.

He is also a current lawyer for the Patton&Patton law firm in Topeka and Lenexa, Kansas.
