= Doug Mays =

American politician

Speaker of the Kansas House of Representatives
- In office January 13, 2003 – January 8, 2007
- Preceded by: Kent Glasscock
- Succeeded by: Melvin Neufeld

Member of the Kansas House of Representatives from the 54th district
- In office 1993 – January 8, 2007
- Preceded by: Bill Roy Jr.
- Succeeded by: Joe Patton

Personal details
- Born: August 18, 1950 (age 75) Pittsburg, Kansas
- Party: Republican
- Spouse: Lena Mays

Doug Mays (born August 18, 1950) is an American politician who served in the Kansas House of Representatives as a Republican from the 54th district from 1993 to January 8, 2007.

Mays was originally elected in the November 1992 general election. He served for seven terms in the House, including serving as Speaker of the House for the 2003 through 2006 sessions; in 2006, he declined to run for re-election and was succeeded by fellow Republican Joe Patton.
