= Robin Jennison =

American politician

Speaker of the Kansas House of Representatives
- In office January 11, 1999 – January 8, 2001
- Preceded by: Tim Shallenburger
- Succeeded by: Kent Glasscock

Member of the Kansas House of Representatives from the 117th district
- In office 1991 – January 8, 2001
- Succeeded by: Larry Powell

Personal details
- Born: March 10, 1954 (age 72) Fort Scott, KS
- Party: Republican
- Spouse: Denise Jennison

Robin Jennison (born March 10, 1954) is an American politician who served in the Kansas House of Representatives from 1991 to 2001, including a two-year stint as House Speaker during his final term. Jennison worked as a farmer and stockman.
