= Carl Holmes =

American politician

Member of the Kansas House of Representatives from the 125th district
- In office January 14, 1985 – January 14, 2013
- Preceded by: Robert Frey
- Succeeded by: Reid Petty

Personal details
- Born: October 19, 1940 (age 85) Dodge City, Kansas, U.S.
- Party: Republican
- Spouse: Willynda Holmes
- Education: Colorado State University

Carl Holmes (October 19, 1940) is an American politician, and a Republican former member of the Kansas House of Representatives, who represented the 125th district from 1985 to 2013.

Prior to his election to the House, Holmes served as mayor of the city of Plains from 1982 to 1989. Since 1962 he has worked as a land manager of Holmes Farms.

Holmes received his BBA from Colorado State University.

Holmes was defeated in the August 7, 2012, Republican Primary by Reid Petty, losing by only 9 votes, 904–895. Petty is a member of the school board in Liberal and is the Seward County Republican Chairman.

== Committee membership ==
- Energy and Utilities (Chair)
- Agriculture and Natural Resources Budget
- Joint Committee on Administrative Rules and Regulations (Chair)
- Joint Committee on Energy and Environmental Policy (Vice-Chair)

== Major donors ==
The top 5 donors to Holmes's 2008 campaign:

- 1. Pioneer Communications - $1,000
- 2. Westar Energy - $1,000
- 3. Kansas Contractors Assoc - $1,000
- 4. AT&T - $1,000
- 5. Prairie Band Potawatomi Nation - $750
