= Michael O'Neal =

American politician (born 1951)

Speaker of the Kansas House of Representatives
- In office 2009 – January 14, 2013
- Preceded by: Melvin Neufeld
- Succeeded by: Raymond Merrick

Member of the Kansas House of Representatives from the 104th district
- In office January 14, 1985 – January 14, 2013
- Preceded by: Steven Ediger
- Succeeded by: Steven Becker

Personal details
- Born: January 16, 1951 (age 75) Kansas City, Missouri, U.S.
- Party: Republican
- Spouse: Cindy
- Children: Haley O'Neal, Austin O'Neal
- Education: University of Kansas

Michael O'Neal (born January 16, 1951) is an American lawyer and Republican politician from Hutchinson, Kansas. He served as the Speaker of the Kansas House of Representatives from 2009 to 2013.

== Early life and education ==
O'Neal was adopted as an infant by Ralph and Margaret O'Neal, a farm family from Manning, Kansas, near Scott City, Kansas. An only child, O'Neal lived on the farm until he was four. O'Neal's father had been farming with his father and a brother but decided to give up farming and the family moved to Colby, Kansas, for a short time before moving to Scott City, where Ralph made a living in bread sales and owned and operated a home delivery dairy business. O'Neal attended public schools from kindergarten through high school in Scott City. O'Neal graduated #2 in his class at Scott Community High School in 1969.

O'Neal went to college on a National Science Foundation scholarship, attending the University of Kansas from 1969 to 1973, where he earned a B.A. in English and was accepted into the University of Kansas School of Law. During his second and third year of law school, O'Neal interned with the Office of Legislative Counsel. There he was involved in writing Supreme Court briefs on the Legislature's behalf in such landmark cases as Brown v. Wichita State University and Leek v. Theis. In his third year of law school O'Neal was co-chairman of Moot Court Council. O'Neal earned his J.D. degree at KU in 1976 and moved to Hutchinson, Kansas, where he has practiced law for nearly 30 years. O'Neal has been active in the Reno County Republican Party, first as a precinct committeeman, then as a member of the executive committee of the county party.

== Political career ==
O'Neal was first elected to the Kansas House of Representatives in 1984, beating incumbent Democrat Steven Ediger. In 1984, O'Neal was in the inaugural class of Leadership Hutchinson and in 1985, his first year in the House, he was selected to Leadership Kansas. In 1986, O'Neal received the Outstanding Young Men of America award and in 1987 was an American Council of Young Political Leaders delegate to the Biennial Assembly in Strasbourg, France. O'Neal has also served on the Kansas Sentencing Commission, KU Law Society Board of Governors, the Kansas Tourism Commission, the Hutchinson YMCA Board of Directors, and was Chairman of the Wesley Towers Advisory Committee.

O'Neal served as Chairman of the House Judiciary Committee and was Chairman of the House Redistricting Committee during the 2002 session. That Committee redrew House, Senate, State Board of Education and Congressional boundaries following the revised federal census of 2000. O'Neal then successfully represented the Legislature in Federal Court when the redistricting plan was challenged. O'Neal has chaired the House Judiciary Committee three different times totaling 13 years and has served as Chairman of the House Education Committee. O'Neal was twice elected to the office of Republican Whip. In his eleventh term, O'Neal, along with two of his 1985 legislative classmates, is the senior member of the Kansas House of Representatives.

O'Neal is a commissioner with the National Conference of Commissioners on Uniform State Laws and serves as a member of the Kansas Judicial Council. His other current committee assignments are Rules & Journal Committee and the House Transportation, Judicial Branch, Revenue and KPERS Budget Subcommittee. Other legislative memberships include the National Conference of State Legislatures, Council of State Governments, and the American Legislative Exchange Council (ALEC). In 1997, O'Neal accompanied a group of Kansas State University educators and fellow legislators on an educational exchange mission to Voronezh, Russia to assist their emerging democracy.

O'Neal was the recipient of the Friend of Small Business award from the Kansas Chapter of the National Federation of Small Business, and recipient of the Kansas Bar Association's Making a Difference Award. Recent honors include being named 2002 State Official of the Year by the National Association of Home Builders, being named 2005 Kansas Pro-Jobs Legislator by the Kansas Chamber of Commerce, and being selected to the 2005 Class of Kansas Super Lawyers. The Kansas Policy Institute gave him a Freedom Index score of 75%. The Kansas Chapter of Americans for Prosperity gave him an evaluation of 90 on conservative issues.

=== Controversies ===
In 2011, O'Neal sent an email that referred to the First Lady Michelle Obama as "Mrs. YoMama". He later apologized for the email.

In 2012, O'Neal forwarded an e-mail about President Obama that quoted Psalm 109:8 which reads, "... Let his days be few; and let another take his office." Criticism followed in part because of the following Verse 9, "Let his children be fatherless, and his wife a widow." O'Neal has to date offered no apology for this second email claiming that he was only referencing the first verse. Some politically conservative Christians have used this Psalm as an anti-Obama slogan throughout the President's administration.

O'Neal's behavior in public office has led to calls for his resignation. This public ire with O'Neal has surfaced on a Facebook page titled "Fire Mike O'Neal". This page has many postings calling for his resignation, removal from public office, and even calling for his arrest. It's uncertain though whether general public ire or ridicule by members of his own party that have led to the Speaker's decision to retire.

On June 1, 2012, O'Neal announced his retirement and his decision to stand down from running for re-election. He was succeeded as Speaker by Ray Merrick.

== Career in law ==
Since 1988, O'Neal has been a shareholder in the Gilliland & Hayes law firm in Hutchinson. The firm also has offices in Wichita, Kansas, Kansas City, Kansas, and Lawrence, Kansas. The firm's senior partner was former House member and Majority Leader John Hayes, whose former district O'Neal now represents. O'Neal has an active state and federal trial practice involving, primarily, the defense of doctors and other health care providers. O'Neal is a member of the Kansas Bar Association, Kansas Association of Defense Counsel, Kansas Trial Lawyers Association, and the Defense Research Institute.

== Family and interests ==
O'Neal and his wife Cindy lived in Hutchinson, Kansas, until 2013 when they moved to Lawrence, Kansas. O'Neal has two children, Haley and Austin. Both Haley and Austin graduated from the University of Kansas. Cindy worked for the Kansas legislature 1987-2014 and was a lead lobbyist for Hein Governmental Consulting from 2015 to 2016. Cindy was twice appointed to serve on the Kansas State Fair Board 2012–2017. The O’Neals divorced in 2016 and both have since remarried.

== Comments regarding the President ==
O'Neal used scripture in a widely circulated email to suggest President Barack Obama's "days be few in number" from Psalm 109:8. The Psalm continued: "may his children be orphans and his wife a widow". As a result of O'Neal's comments, a widely circulated petition quickly garnered over 30,000 signatures. "He is using sacred scripture to flippantly suggest people should be praying for the death of the president," said Michael Sherrard, a spokesman for Faithful America, an online interfaith community based in Washington that organized the petition.
