= Kent Glasscock =

American politician

Speaker of the Kansas House of Representatives
- In office 2001 – January 13, 2003
- Preceded by: Robin Jennison
- Succeeded by: Doug Mays

Member of the Kansas House of Representatives from the 62nd district
- In office January 14, 1991 – January 13, 2003
- Preceded by: Bruce Larkin
- Succeeded by: Bruce Larkin

Personal details
- Born: November 4, 1952 (age 73) Warrensburg, Missouri, U.S.
- Party: Republican

Kenton Lee "Kent" Glasscock (born November 4, 1952) is a former Republican politician from Manhattan, Kansas. Glasscock was born in Warrensburg, Missouri, to Bill and Frances Glasscock. He served as Speaker of the House of the State of Kansas from 2001 to 2003. During his tenure, he served as the co-author of Governor Bill Graves budgets. Glasscock served as State Representative from the 62nd District from 1991–2003, was mayor of Manhattan in 1989 and served as a city commissioner from 1987–1990.

== Candidate for Governor ==
During the 2002 election, Glasscock pursued the office of Governor of Kansas in a large field of conservatives and moderates. Glasscock announced while speaking to the Manhattan Konza Rotary Club. Glasscock left the race due to health problems. Kansas Attorney General Carla Stovall briefly campaigned for the Republican nomination for the office of Governor with Glasscock as her running mate. Despite an early lead in the polls, Stovall withdrew from the race in order to get married and spend more time with family.

Glasscock returned to the race and was the front runner in campaign funds. Stovall's abrupt exit from the race caused the Republican party leaders to call a summit with Governor Bill Graves, Lt. Governor Gary Sherrer, Glasscock, Mark Parkinson, and the Governor's Chief of Staff. They met to strategize who should seek the nomination and take on eventual Democratic nominee Kathleen Sebelius. Governor Graves opted to support no one, and the result was an expensive three-way race. Glasscock joined with long-time mayor of Wichita, Bob Knight. The Knight-Glasscock ticket finished third behind Senator Dave Kerr and Mary Birch in second, and then State Treasurer Tim Shallenburger. Kansans did not elect the conservative nominee Shallenburger.

== Kansas House service ==
Glasscock represented Manhattan’s 62nd House District beginning in 1991. First elected to the House in 1990, he served the state legislature in many capacities including Speaker of the House, House Majority Leader, chair of the Government Organization and Elections Committee, chair of the Local Government Committee, and vice-chair of the Taxation Committee. He also served as a member of several committees: Appropriations, Energy and Natural Resources, Economic Development, the Joint Committee on Pensions and Investments, and the Joint Committee on Administrative Rules and Regulations.

Glasscock's tenure as Speaker of the House and House Majority Leader was challenged with moderate versus conservative battles over control of committees and legislation. Glasscock was elected to speaker on the fourth ballot after three ties. Despite these challenges, Glasscock successfully led a legislative initiative that made the state's single largest one-time investment in higher education research infrastructure; advanced an innovative early childhood Skills for Success education investment; and produced balanced budgets that protected funding for both higher education and K-12 education. In 1992, the National Council on State Governments selected Glasscock as one of 32 members of the annual Henry Toll Fellowship Program, the premier leadership development program for state government officials.

During his tenure, he served as the co-author of Governor Bill Graves budgets. Glasscock served as State Representative from the 62nd District from 1991-2003, was Mayor of Manhattan in 1989 and served as City Commissioner from 1987-1990.

== Education, family, business ==
Glasscock earned his undergraduate degree in English from Kansas State University and is a graduate of Manhattan High School.

Following 2002, the Glasscocks live in Manhattan, working in private and local business and perform non-profit charitable work. Glasscock is married to Janna Williams, director of a regional non-profit and has two sons.

Glasscock is currently CEO of K-State Innovation Partners. K-State Innovation Partners mission is to collaborate with university, industry and communities to deliver a streamlined mission of corporate engagement, technology commercialization and economic development.

Glasscock also is president of his family business, the Kansas Lumber Homestore, Inc.
