= Patrice McClammy =

American attorney and politician

Member of the Alabama House of Representatives from the 76th district
- Incumbent
- Assumed office November 17, 2021
- Preceded by: Thad McClammy

Personal details
- Born: Patrice Ernita McClammy
- Party: Democratic
- Parent: Thad McClammy (father)
- Education: Hampton University (BA); Faulkner University (AA, JD); Florida State University (PhD)

Patrice Ernita "Penni" McClammy is an American attorney and politician serving as a member of the Alabama House of Representatives from the 76th district. She assumed office on November 17, 2021. She a member of the Democratic Party.

== Early life and education ==
A native of Montgomery, Alabama, McClammy attended Sidney Lanier High School. She earned a Bachelor of Arts degree in political science from Hampton University in 1997, an Associate of Arts in legal studies from Faulkner University in 1999, a Juris Doctor from the Thomas Goode Jones School of Law in 2002, and a PhD in public policy and administration from Florida State University in 2006.

== Career ==
Outside of politics, McClammy operates a private legal practice. After her father, Thad McClammy, died in office, Patrice declared her candidacy to succeed him. She did not face a challenger in the general election and assumed office on November 17, 2021.
