= Thad McClammy =

American politician (1942–2021)

Member of the Alabama House of Representatives from the 76th district
- In office November 9, 1994 – August 21, 2021
- Preceded by: Mike Mikell
- Succeeded by: Patrice McClammy

Personal details
- Born: October 22, 1942 Beatrice, Alabama, U.S.
- Died: August 21, 2021 (aged 78) Atlanta, Georgia, U.S.
- Party: Democratic
- Children: Patrice McClammy
- Education: Alabama State University (BA); Auburn University (MS)

Thad McClammy (October 22, 1942 – August 21, 2021) was an American politician who was a member of the Alabama House of Representatives for the 76th district from 1994 to 2021.

== Early life and education ==
Born in Beatrice, Alabama, McClammy received his Bachelor of Arts degree from Alabama State University in 1966 and a Master of Science in vocational and adult education from Auburn University in 1975.

== Career ==
McClammy was in the real estate business. He was a member of the Alabama House of Representatives for the 76th district, from 1994 until his death. He was a member of the Democratic party.

== Personal life ==
McClammy died on August 21, 2021, in Atlanta, Georgia, at age 78.
