= Bud Estes =

American politician (1946–2021)

Member of the Kansas Senate from the 38th district
- In office January 9, 2017 – February 13, 2021
- Preceded by: Garrett Love
- Succeeded by: Ron Ryckman Sr.

Member of the Kansas House of Representatives from the 119th district
- In office June 20, 2013 – January 9, 2017
- Preceded by: Brian Weber
- Succeeded by: Bradley Ralph

Mayor of Bucklin
- In office 1976–1990

Personal details
- Born: October 4, 1946 Dodge City, Kansas, U.S.
- Died: February 13, 2021 (aged 74) Bucklin, Kansas, U.S.
- Party: Republican
- Spouse: Renae Estes
- Children: 4
- Education: Fort Hays State University
- Website: BudEstes.com

Bud Estes (October 4, 1946 – February 13, 2021) was an American politician. He was a Republican member of the Kansas Senate for the 38th district, from 2017 until his death, and previously served as the 119th district state representative. Estes also served as the mayor of Bucklin, Kansas, for fourteen years.

Estes died in February 2021, after being hospitalized due to a prolonged illness.

== Committee membership ==
Estes has served on the following legislative committees:

- Health & Human Services
- Insurance & Financial Institutions
- Federal and State Affairs
