= Ron Ryckman Sr. =

American politician

Ron Ryckman

Member of the Kansas Senate from the 38th district
- Incumbent
- Assumed office March 4, 2021
- Preceded by: Bud Estes

Member of the Kansas House of Representatives from the 115th district
- In office January 10, 2011 – January 9, 2017
- Preceded by: Melvin Neufeld
- Succeeded by: Boyd Orr

Personal details
- Born: December 16, 1948 (age 77) Traverse City, Michigan, U.S.
- Party: Republican
- Spouse: Mary
- Children: Ron Ryckman Jr.

Ronald W. Ryckman Sr. (born December 16, 1948) is an American politician. He was a Republican member of the Kansas House of Representatives representing the 115th District which includes a southern section of Dodge City, Ashland, Fowler, Meade, Plains, Copeland, Montezuma, Ensign, Ingalls and Cimarron in southwestern Kansas from 2011 to 2017. Ryckman's first term began in January 2011 when he was elected by precinct people to replace Garrett Love who was elected to the State Senate after defeating former Speaker Melvin Neufeld. Ryckman served in the United States Army from 1970 to 1972 before beginning his twenty-nine-year career as a public school teacher. He served on the Meade School Board from 2009 until elected to the Kansas House.

On March 4, 2021, Ryckman was appointed to the Senate after the death of Bud Estes.

== Committee Memberships ==
- Judiciary
- Education
- General Government Budget
