= Ron Ryckman Jr. =

American politician from Kansas

Ron Ryckman

Speaker of the Kansas House of Representatives
- In office January 9, 2017 – January 9, 2023
- Preceded by: Raymond Merrick
- Succeeded by: Dan Hawkins

Member of the Kansas House of Representatives from the 78th district
- In office January 14, 2013 – January 9, 2023
- Preceded by: Ed Trimmer
- Succeeded by: Robyn Essex

Personal details
- Born: December 17, 1971 (age 54) Meade, Kansas, U.S.
- Party: Republican
- Children: 3
- Relatives: Ron Ryckman Sr. (father)
- Education: MidAmerica Nazarene University (BA)

Ronald Ryckman Jr. (December 17, 1971) is an American politician who represented the 78th District in the Kansas House of Representatives from 2013 to 2023, and served as the Speaker of the House from 2017 to 2023. He was first elected to the Kansas House in 2012, and previously served on the Olathe City Council from 2009 to 2017.

== Early life ==
Ryckman was born and raised in Meade, Kansas. He attended MidAmerica Nazarene University as a student athlete, where he received his bachelor's degree. He later started several small businesses in the Johnson County area.

== Kansas House of Representatives ==
Ryckman was first elected to the Kansas House of Representatives in 2012. He was inspired by his father Ron Ryckman Sr. to run for the Kansas House of Representatives; his father was a state representative at the time. In 2017, Ryckman was first elected by his peers to preside as Speaker of the House. He was re-elected as speaker in 2019 and again in 2021, marking him as the first state representative in state history to be elected as Speaker of the House for three consecutive terms.

Ryckman currently chairs the Interstate Cooperation Committee, and serves as vice-chair of the Legislative Coordinating Council and the House Committee on Calendar and Printing Committee. He also serves as a member on the House Legislative Budget Committee.

He previously served as the chairman of the House Appropriations Committee, a position he assumed in January 2015. He is the former House Majority Whip and a former chairman of the House Social Services Budget Committee.

=== Transparency ===
In 2018, Ryckman instituted a new set of rules to end the century-old practice of the anonymous introduction of bills in the Kansas House. Any individuals including legislator, lobbyist, advocate, or organization that request the introduction of legislation is now posted publicly and visibly on the Legislature's website. This change was made in effort to improve transparency within the Legislative Branch.

=== Welfare reform ===
In 2013, Ryckman sponsored legislation to require welfare recipients to undergo drug testing. Specifically, only individuals who are suspected of using illegal drugs would be required to be tested. Any individual who is tested and fails to qualify can request a second test, and can be reimbursed for that test. This legislation was signed into law by Governor Sam Brownback in April of that year.

=== Legislative process changes ===
After a shortened 2020 Legislative Session due to the COVID-19 pandemic, Ryckman implemented several changes to House protocol in effort to keep legislators and staff safe and healthy during the 2021 session. Of these safety precautions most notable was the $3 million spent on upgrading the legislature's video and audio streaming, and teleconference technology, which allowed the public to participate virtually in the committee process for the first time. In addition, half of the House members were seated by Ryckman in the east and west galleries to ensure appropriate social distance while in the House chamber.

== Personal life ==
Ryckman was born and raised in Meade, Kansas, and later attended MidAmerica Nazarene University as a student athlete. He has three children.

Political offices
| Preceded by Ray Merrick | Speaker of the Kansas House of Representatives; 2017–2023 | Succeeded by Dan Hawkins |
