= Kansas's 38th Senate district =

American legislative district

Kansas's 38th State Senate district
Senator
Ron Ryckman Sr. R–Meade
- Demographics: 45% White; 3% Black; 49% Hispanic; 2% Asian; 1% Other
- Population (2018): 69,819

Kansas's 38th Senate district is one of 40 districts in the Kansas Senate. It has been represented by Republican Ron Ryckman Sr. since March 2021, following the death of incumbent Bud Estes on February 13, 2021.

== Geography ==
District 38 is predominantly based in the two Western Kansas cities of Dodge City and Liberal, covering all of Clark, Ford, Gray, Meade, and Seward Counties and part of Hodgeman County. Other communities in the district include Cimarron, Meade, and Ashland.

The district is located entirely within Kansas's 1st congressional district, and overlaps with the 115th, 117th, 119th, 124th, and 125th districts of the Kansas House of Representatives. It borders the state of Oklahoma.

== Recent election results ==
=== 2020 ===
2020 Kansas Senate election, District 38
Party	Candidate	Votes	%
Republican	Bud Estes (incumbent)	13,274	68.9
Democratic	Edgar Pando	5,994	31.1
Total votes		19,268	100
Republican hold			

=== 2016 ===
2016 Kansas Senate election, District 38
Primary election
Party	Candidate	Votes	%
Republican	Bud Estes	4,488	64.8
Republican	Joyce Warshaw	2,438	35.2
Total votes		6,926	100
General election
Republican	Bud Estes	12,884	75.7
Democratic	Miguel Angel Rodriguez	4,130	24.3
Total votes		17,014	100
Republican hold			

=== 2012 ===
2012 Kansas Senate election, District 38
Party	Candidate	Votes	%
Republican	Garrett Love (incumbent)	13,539	77.0
Democratic	Johnny Dunlap II	4,033	23.0
Total votes		17,572	100
Republican hold			

=== Federal and statewide results ===
Year	Office	Results
2020	President	Trump 69.8 – 28.3%
2018	Governor	Kobach 54.7 – 32.0%
2016	President	Trump 70.1 – 24.8%
2012	President	Romney 71.8 – 26.4%
