= Greg Orman =

American businessman and politician

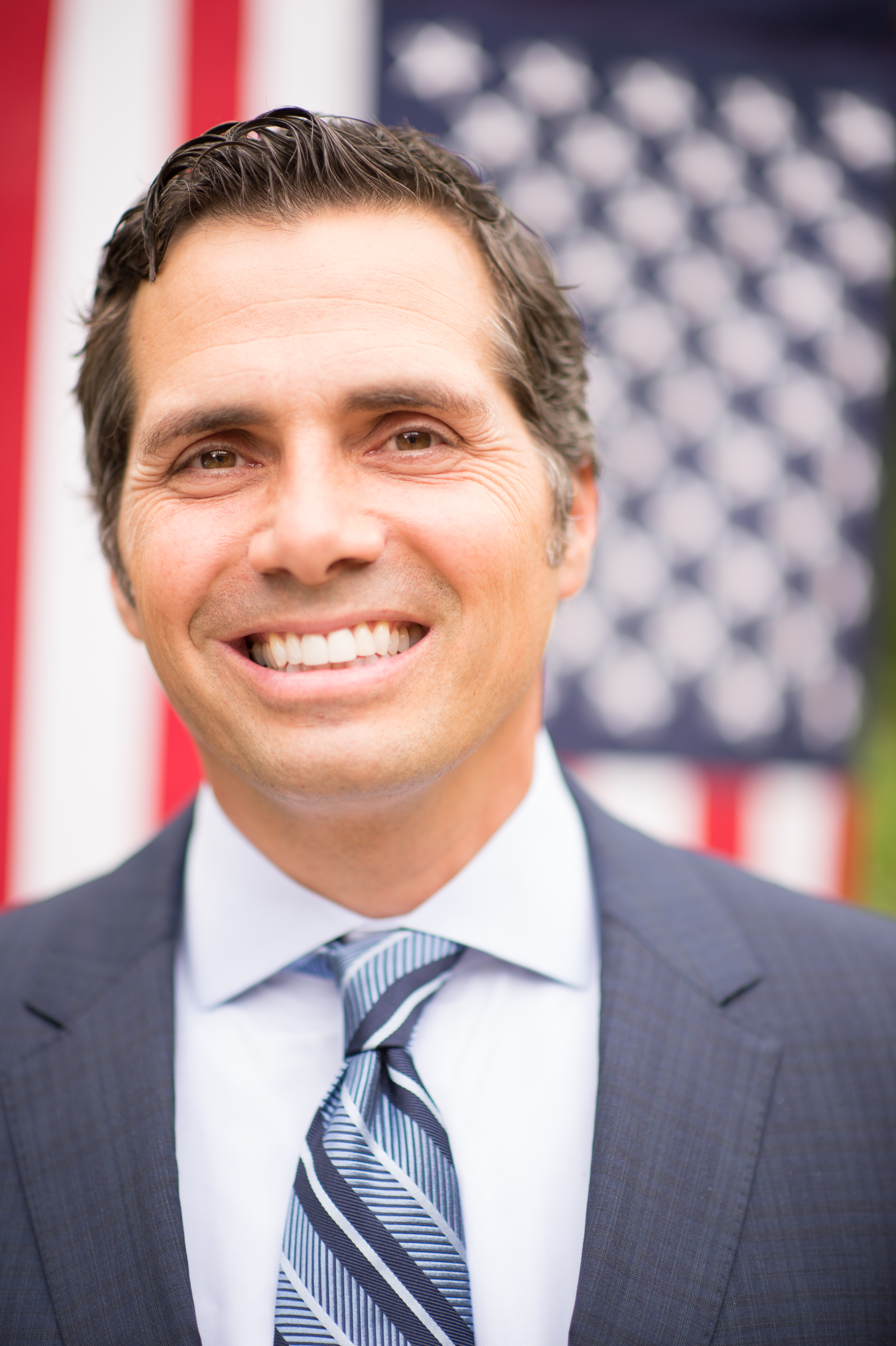
- Orman in 2014

Personal details
- Born: Gregory John Orman; December 2, 1968 (age 57) Mankato, Minnesota, U.S.
- Party: Independent (2009–present)
- Other political affiliations: Republican (before 2007); Democratic (2007–2009)
- Spouse: Sybil Orman (m. 2013)
- Children: 3
- Education: Princeton University (BA)
- Website: greg-orman.com

Gregory John Orman (born December 2, 1968) is an American politician, businessman, and entrepreneur. He ran as an independent to represent Kansas in the United States Senate in the 2014 election and for governor of Kansas in the 2018 election.

Orman challenged incumbent U.S. Senator Pat Roberts in the 2014 election, earning 42.5 percent of the vote. Running for governor in 2018, polling indicated that in a three-way race Orman was at 19 percent, Democrat Laura Kelly at 32 percent and Republican Kris Kobach at 38 percent after the major party conventions. Orman suspended his television ads and stopped actively fundraising in mid-September. In the general election of 2018, he received approximately 6.5% of the vote.

== Background ==
Orman was born in Minneapolis, Minnesota, raised in Mankato, Minnesota, and is the second-oldest of six children. His mother, Darlene Gates, was a registered nurse. When he was five his parents divorced. His mother received full custody of the children and later sued her ex-husband for increases in child support payments. His father, Tim, moved to Stanley, Kansas, where he co-owned a furniture store. Orman lived with his mother during the school year and with his father during the summer where he worked in his father's warehouse. His mother was a Democrat and his father a Republican. As a young adult, Orman admired Ronald Reagan.

Orman graduated from Mankato East Senior High School in 1987 as co-valedictorian of his class. In 1986, he was the national President of the Boys Nation and met President Reagan at a ceremony in the White House Rose Garden.

Orman graduated magna cum laude from Princeton University in 1991 with a degree in economics and finance. He was a member of the Princeton College Republicans and worked for George H. W. Bush's presidential campaign in 1988. However, in 1992 he supported independent candidate Ross Perot.

Orman currently sits as a member of the boards for various charitable organizations and non-profit organizations, including Unite America, the National Police Foundation which studies the effects of policing, and American Public Square at Jewell College which advocates for public discourse.

== Business career ==
After graduating, Orman worked for a consultancy firm McKinsey & Company. At age 23 he founded Environmental Lighting Concepts LLC, which designs and installs energy-efficient lighting systems for commercial and industrial companies. Orman built the business "into a multi-million-dollar enterprise with 120 employees within four years." About Orman, a colleague at the time said "this guy had a plan and a vision" and "seemed to work around the clock."

In 1996, Orman was put in charge of KLT Energy Services, a subsidiary of Kansas City Power & Light after it bought a 70 percent stake in Orman's business. Orman remained at Kansas City Power & Light for six more years and grew KLT Energy Services from less than $100 million in revenues to almost $1 billion before leaving the company in 2002.

Drue Jennings, the CEO of Kansas City Power & Light at the time of their purchase of Environmental Lighting Concepts, referred to Orman as "very disciplined, and very studious, and never just took a flier at something. He had it thought through."

In 2004, Orman co-founded private equity firm Denali Partners LLC and is the Managing Member of Exemplar Holdings, LLC. Exemplar Holdings lists six portfolio companies on its website: 1. Combat Brands, a Lenexa, Kansas-based boxing equipment manufacturer; 2. Ripple Glass, a Kansas City-based recycler of glass containers that operates in six states; 3. Exemplar Medical, which focuses on investing in companies that reduce the cost of healthcare; 4. Exemplar Finance, which provides financing for capital equipment projects utilizing energy-efficient technology; 5. Dragon Jacket, a manufacturer of a patented, reusable pipe insulation product; and 6. an affordable housing subsidiary that invests in local, affordable housing communities.

On December 28, 2015, Combat Brands LLC, the Orman-led company, announced it acquired Kansas City-based Fitness First, Inc. Fitness First, a fitness equipment provider, was consolidated into Combat Brands, but operates under the name Fitness First. Acquiring Fitness First would help expand Combat's product offerings and grow the company, Orman said in an interview with Kansas City Business Journal. Orman extended employment offers to all Fitness First employees.

In July 2020, according to the Kansas City Business Journal, Orman sold Combat Brands to its employees through an Employee Stock Ownership Plan. Instead of selling to a competitor which would have led to layoffs and moving operations out of Lenexa, KS, Orman said the sale "allowed us to ultimately reward the people who had been so instrumental in helping the business be successful." Combat Brands CEO Doug Skeens is also quoted, as saying the transfer of ownership to the employees has "boosted morale, employee engagement, and collaboration" and "gives employees financial security." Skeens referred to it as "the highlight" of his career.

He has professional and personal ties to former Goldman Sachs director Rajat Gupta, and served as his designated representative on the board of New Silk Route, a private equity fund, from April 2013 until March 2014. When Gupta was convicted of insider trading in 2012, Orman said that "He is a friend of mine, he made a huge mistake, and he's paying the price for it. It shocked me like it shocked a lot of people when it came out that he was charged with those things." According to news reports, Gupta's conviction was unrelated to any business affiliation with Orman.

== Political career ==
Orman has been unaffiliated with a party since 2010. At various times before that, he was registered as a Republican and a Democrat. After a debate in 2014 Orman stated, "I've tried both parties, and, like most Kansans, I've been disappointed."

Orman has made donations to both Democratic and Republican candidates. In 2006, while he was considering running as a Democrat for the Senate, he gave $1,000 to Harry Reid and $4,600 to the 2008 presidential campaigns of Barack Obama and Hillary Clinton. Public records also show donations to the Democratic Party, Kansan United States representatives Dennis Moore and Nancy Boyda, as well as Minnesota Democratic senator Al Franken.

Orman's Republican donations include Todd Akin in 2006 and Scott Brown in 2010. Orman said the Scott Brown donation was made in part to block the passage of Obamacare because Orman believed that the ACA would not achieve the central goal of decreasing healthcare costs. According to the Associated Press, Orman said, "I thought at the time we were expanding a broken system." Orman also said that later attempts by Republicans to repeal the law were impractical because Obama remained in office with veto power. The AP quotes Orman saying "It sounds like a hollow political promise they can't keep."

Orman was briefly a candidate for the Democratic nomination in the 2008 U.S. Senate election in Kansas, but dropped out before the primary, saying "Whenever you run as a candidate in either party, there are certain constituencies that want you to behave and act and believe certain things. As I evaluated the race and looked at the positions I was going to have to take to get the support that was necessary to win, I just didn't feel comfortable taking those positions."

=== 2014 U.S. Senate election ===
Orman was an independent candidate in Kansas's 2014 U.S. Senate election. The campaign gathered enough signatures to get on the ballot as a candidate for the general election.

He faced incumbent Republican Senator Pat Roberts in the November general election. Orman was the main rival to Roberts after Democrat Chad Taylor dropped out of the race on September 3 over concerns that he and Orman would split votes from Independent and Democratic voters not breaking for Roberts.

The group Traditional Republicans for Common Sense endorsed Orman on September 3, 2014. This group was composed of approximately 70 former Republican elected officials. Jim Yonally, chairman of the group, stated "We believe Greg Orman is the best-qualified candidate for the office of United States senator from Kansas", although some other members of the group expressed their support for Roberts following the announcement. During the campaign, Orman did not appear to receive significant support or help from any politicians or organizations, including Democrats. After the election, final fundraising reports showed that groups supporting Orman had received $1.5 million from Senate Majority PAC, run by former advisors to Democratic Majority Leader Harry Reid, $1 million from Independent New York City Mayor Michael Bloomberg, and donations from GOP donors Peter Ackerman, Greg Penner, Jeffrey Binder and John Burbank.

Because the makeup of the U.S. Senate might have been affected if Orman were elected, NBC News said that Orman could be "the most interesting man in politics" in 2014. If Orman had been victorious, the U.S. Senate would have had three independent senators for the first time in the chamber's history.

==== Potential caucus affiliation ====
Due to congressional makeup leading up to the 2014 Senate elections, Orman could have played a pivotal role in selecting the Senate Majority Leader. He proposed to caucus with whichever party held the majority in the Senate, saying that "it's in the best interests of the voters of Kansas that they have a senator in the majority".

In the event that Orman held the tiebreaking vote in the Senate, he stated that he would ask both parties to commit to issues including immigration and tax reform and caucus with whichever agreed. He said in October 2014 that if, after caucusing with one party for four or five months he found that "they're engaged in the same old partisan politics", he would "absolutely" consider caucusing with the other party to give them the majority instead. He explained: "Ultimately, this is about solving problems. This is about the voters of Kansas saying—the status quo doesn't work anymore."

Orman stated that he voted for Obama in 2008 and voted for Republican nominee Mitt Romney in 2012. In 2010 he founded the Common Sense Coalition to promote the voices of "the sensible middle".

==== Election results ====
Although Orman led incumbent Roberts in the polls in early November, Roberts defeated Orman 53% to 43%, with the balance going to Randall Batson, the Libertarian candidate. Robert's win was coined a "rescue mission" by the Washington Post. According to another Washington Post report, "Roberts spent the better part of September trailing his challenger by as much as 10 points...So, the national party sent in reinforcements and replaced the people at the head of Roberts's campaign. Sarah Palin, Ted Cruz, Rand Paul -- a galaxy of the GOP's top stars -- trotted through what is often described as a flyover state. Bob Dole, on his tour of all 105 counties in Kansas, talked about his friend, Pat. Outside groups poured in nearly $10 million to support Roberts and to oppose Orman. Other outside groups also spent nearly $6 million in negative ads against Roberts."

On April 29, 2015, Lincoln Park Strategies released its PAAR (Percent Above Anticipated Results) report on predicted results versus actual results for the 2014 Senate elections. The report included Greg Orman's independent campaign for the U.S. Senate. The report concluded that "Greg Orman in Kansas had the highest positive PAAR score at 10.8. Although Pat Roberts is back in Washington DC for another six years, Orman was able to drop Roberts an astronomical 12 points below what a Republican candidate was expected to receive in 2014. Governor Sam Brownback and some self-imposed mistakes clearly helped Orman, yet the campaign deserves full accolades for having the second highest PAAR score from both parties."

=== Political positions ===
According to Kansas Democratic Party Chairwoman Joan Wagnon, Orman, and the Democratic Party have similar views in support of certain gun restrictions, reproductive rights, and other matters. Orman has described himself as "a problem solver, not a partisan" and describes his ideology as "fiscally responsible and socially tolerant". He supports "broad tax reform", is concerned about the impact entitlement spending is having on the federal deficit, and agrees with some of the ideas of former Republican House Budget Committee Chairman Paul Ryan.

Orman has stated that he supports campaign finance reform, by proposing expansion of campaign finance disclosure rules and contribution restrictions. He also supports a constitutional amendment that would overturn the Citizens United decision. Orman has also proposed several reforms to campaign financing, including a ban on political action committees formed by congressional leaders and a ban on PAC donations from lobbyists to candidates.

Orman has declined to indicate whether he would have voted for the Dodd–Frank Wall Street Reform and Consumer Protection Act. He did say, however, that "we need to relax the Dodd-Frank regulations that relate to community banks and region banks."

Orman indicated in 2014 that he would promote oil and gas development, stating, "I believe that we need to support continued oil and gas development." He also indicated he would support, "promoting fuels like compressed natural gas and liquid natural gas and electric vehicles..."

Orman is a gun owner and supports universal background checks on gun sales. In an op-ed with Real Clear Politics Orman wrote, "I am a gun owner, and I certainly don't want to impede those rights. But I also believe that we can proudly bear our arms and have responsible firearm laws. The safety of our children and citizens doesn't have to be at odds with gun ownership. It doesn't have to be mutually exclusive."

In 2014 while running for the U.S. Senate, Orman told the Lawrence Journal-World his views on the Patient Protection and Affordable Care Act, saying that, "I opposed the ACA (in 2009) because it did nothing to fix a broken system. We had a national crisis in health care before the Affordable Care Act passed, and that crisis still exists today. But instead of playing political games with this issue as Republicans and Democrats in Congress have done, I believe we need to focus on what Washington can actually do to ensure that health care is affordable for all Americans."

He has stated he supports maintaining or increasing border patrols to reduce the flow of illegal immigrants into the United States. In addition, he supports a path to citizenship for some of the illegal immigrants already present in the country.

On abortion, Orman is politically pro-choice.

Orman, is a supporter of term limits, and promised to serve no more than two terms if he was elected to the Senate in 2014. He is also an advocate for Ranked Choice Voting, writing a 2016 op-ed title Why Ranked-Choice Voting Makes Sense. In that editorial, he wrote, "Ranked-choice voting effectively allows voters to vote their actual preferences instead of having to vote strategically. This would have a meaningful impact on elections and governing. It would empower independent and third party candidates by eliminating the "wasted vote" argument." "A ranked-choice system would force major party candidates to broaden their appeal to compete for second-choice votes. Candidates could only get elected by appealing to a majority of voters. Negative campaigning would likely decline."

=== 2016 book release ===
On May 3, 2016, Greg Orman's book A Declaration of Independents, How We Can Break the Two-Party Stranglehold and Restore the American Dream, published through the Greenleaf Book Group, went on sale. In the book Orman described his view on how hyper-partisanship, division, and a win-at-all-costs environment in Washington have created a toxic culture of self-interest that has left average Americans behind.

Morton Kondracke praised the book in his 2015 Wall Street Journal book review. He said, "[Orman] argues passionately and convincingly that a third force is necessary to challenge the Republican-Democrat "duopoly" that sustains a status quo of laws, regulations, subsidies and loopholes paid for by special-interest contributions to both parties."

Charles Wheelan, a senior lecturer and policy fellow at the Rockefeller Center at Dartmouth College and contributing writer for U.S. News & World Report wrote in his review, "I hope this will be the first shot in a sustained assault on the broken two-party system. Orman is not a political scientist hunkered down in the Ivory Tower. Nor is he a vapid politician...He's a guy who ran a U.S. Senate campaign that nearly upended the political system."

=== 2018 gubernatorial election ===
Orman filed to run as an independent in the 2018 Kansas governor's race with state senator John Doll. Doll was formerly a Republican House and then Senate member who changed his registration to independent in 2018 to run as Orman's lieutenant gubernatorial running mate. After submitting more than 10,000 signatures, twice the amount needed to appear on the November general election ballot, an objection was raised and then debated in front of the Kansas Board of Objections. Ultimately, only 323 signatures were deemed ineligible by the state Objections Board and Orman was granted ballot access for the November election. The Objections Board consisted of statewide Republican officials, Attorney General Derek Schmidt, Governor Jeff Colyer, and Secretary of State Kris Kobach. All three were represented at the board by their proxies. Colyer and Kobach were candidates for governor, with the latter winning the Republican primary by 343 votes. Colyer's campaign chairman, Steve Baccus, a long time President of Kansas Farm Bureau endorsed Orman after the Republican primary and became a campaign co-chairman for Orman.

Immediately after the major party primaries, polling in a three-way race indicated that Orman was at 19 percent, trailing Democrat Laura Kelly by 13 points and Republican Kris Kobach by 19 points. There was some media attention in the early stages of the general election because additional polling showed Orman outperforming Kelly in a hypothetical head-to-head showdown against Kobach. Polling done by Triton Research and reported on by the Topeka Capital Journal showed Orman would beat Kobach in a head-to-head race by 13 percentage points, while Democrat Kelly was in a dead heat. The race eventually became about which candidate, Orman or Kelly, was more likely to beat Kobach in a three-way race. According to senior staff on the Orman campaign, [despite] "great Orman debate performances, innovative policies, and a compelling message, we just couldn't sell Greg's electability argument. We couldn't get Kansans past the fear of accidentally electing Kobach." In polling released by the Docking Institute at Fort Hays State University in October 2018, Orman had a net positive favorability rating and significantly higher name ID than Laura Kelly (75% for Orman and 62% for Kelly). However, a significant number more said they planned to vote for Kelly. Orman suspended active fundraising efforts and elected to stop running TV advertisements in the Kansas City market by Labor Day. He stopped running ads in the rest of the state in mid-September.

In a poll conducted on September 12–13, Orman, at 9% trailed Kobach and Democratic state senator Laura Kelly, each by about 30 points. By September 18, 2018, dozens of prominent Republicans had endorsed Kelly, including former governor Bill Graves, former U.S. Senators Sheila Frahm and Nancy Kassebaum, and former Kansas Senate President Dick Bond.

Despite significant calls for Orman to drop out of the governor's race and support Laura Kelly, he elected to continue the campaign. After the election, Orman justified this rationale and stated, "Because I believe the most important issue facing us as Americans is our destructive and self-perpetuating two-party system, I was not willing to join it in the service of personal advancement."

== Personal life ==
Orman lives in Fairway, Kansas, with his wife Sybil and their three children (two daughters and a son). He moved to Kansas in 1997, where he was registered as a Republican.

== Bibliography ==
- A Declaration of Independents, How We Can Break the Two-Party Stranglehold and Restore the American Dream ISBN 978-1-62634-332-0
