= Grocery Manufacturers of America =

American lobby group

The Grocery Manufacturers of America (GMA) is a food lobby group. It has existed since at least 1946. GMA "was the largest contributor of honoraria to US Senators in 1976". It was referred to as "the (American) food industry's power broker" in 1979, when its membership roll included 134 large corporations. In 1985, the Grocery Manufacturers of America was an incorporated association in Delaware. The GMA is (or has) a Political Action Committee.

== History ==
In 1979, the GMA opposed product sell-by regulations created by the Massachusetts Department of Public Health right into the Massachusetts Supreme Judicial Court. Judge Herbert P. Wilkins declared for five justices in favour of the regulator.

In 1979, the GMA aimed to stop the Federal Trade Commission (FTC) "from restricting television commercials of sugared products aimed at children".

In 2005, paper producer Kimberly-Clark Corporation announced the appointment of their CEO Thomas J. Falk to the Board of Directors of the GMA. At the time, "42 CEOs representing the nation's leading food, beverage and consumer product companies and sales agencies" were on the board.

In July 2005, the GMA changed its name to the Grocery Manufacturers Association.

In January 2007, the GMA merged with the Food Products Association.

The GMA supported Senator Pat Roberts when he introduced a biotech labeling and GMO foods bill on February 19, 2016. The bill (now Public Law 114-214) established a standardized voluntary labeling plan that would block the state of Vermont from enacting its mandatory genetic engineering labeling law on July 1. In addition it seeks to promote "consumer acceptance of agricultural biotechnology".

The Consumer Brands Association was formed in 2020 "to adopt a proactive agenda".

By 2021, the Grocery Manufacturers of America Inc still had a listing at Bloomberg News. It was said that it "operates as a non-profit organization".
