= Coalition for Safe Affordable Food =

The Coalition for Safe Affordable Food (CFSAF) is an industry group set up by the Biotechnology Industry Organization, the Grocery Manufacturers Association, and CropLife America (the trade association for agrochemical producers). It lobbies against individual states having GMO foods labelling laws and instead supports a federal law (the Safe and Accurate Food Labeling Act of 2015) that would create national standards for GMO labelling. Friends of the Earth and the nutritionist Andy Bellatti have described them as a front group.

CFSAF has lobbied the U.S. Congress regarding labeling of GMOs.
