= 1996 United States Senate election in Kansas =

- November 5, 1996
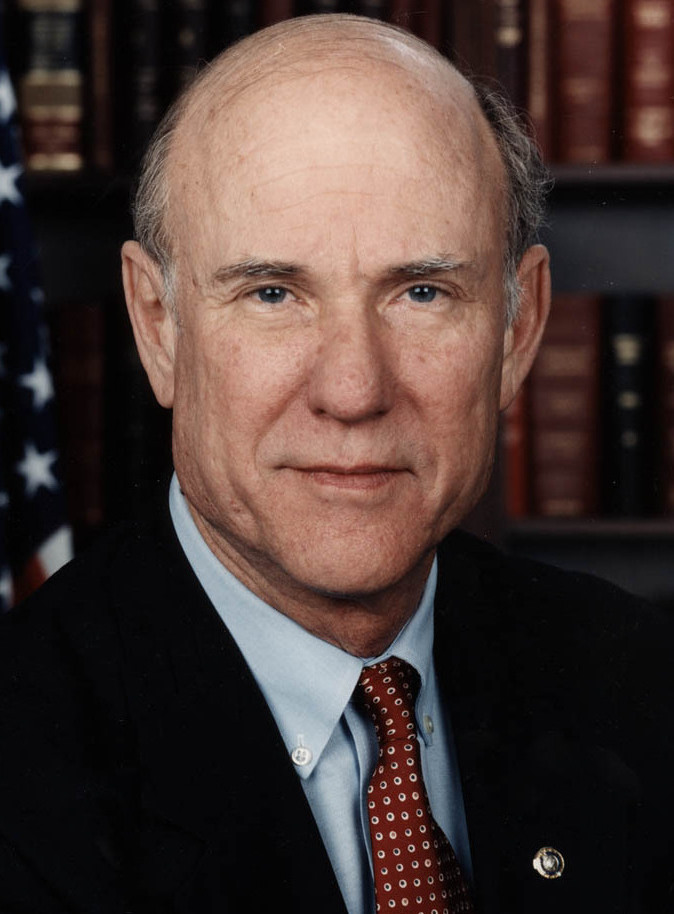

| Nominee | Pat Roberts | Sally Thompson |
| Party | Republican | Democratic |
| Popular vote | 652,677 | 362,380 |
| Percentage | 62.02% | 34.44% |
- County results Roberts: 40–50% 50–60% 60–70% 70–80% 80–90% Thompson: 60–70%
U.S. senator before election
Nancy Kassebaum
Republican
Elected U.S. Senator
Pat Roberts
Republican

The 1996 United States Senate election in Kansas was held November 5, 1996. Incumbent Republican U.S. Senator Nancy Kassebaum decided to retire instead of seeking a fourth term. Republican Pat Roberts won the open seat.

Term limits were an issue during the campaign; while Roberts said that he was not totally opposed to term limits, he was wary of limits that did not apply to current members of Congress, saying that the proposed limits should apply to everyone. While Thompson signed the national term limits pledge from the group Americans for Limited Terms, Roberts declined to do so, becoming the only major party candidate for the U.S. Senate in the 1996 elections to not sign the pledge. However, he did say that "I plan only to serve two terms in the U.S. Senate." In 2014, he was re-elected to a fourth and final term in office, before retiring in 2020.

== Democratic primary ==
=== Candidates ===
- Sally Thompson, Kansas State Treasurer

=== Results ===
Democratic Party primary results
| Party | Candidate | Votes | % |
|---|---|---|---|
| Democratic | Sally Thompson | 121,476 | 100.00% |
| Total votes | | 121,476 | 100.00% |

== Republican primary ==
=== Candidates ===
- Pat Roberts, U.S. Representative
- Tom Little
- Tom Oyler
- Richard L. Cooley

=== Results ===
Republican primary results
| Party | Candidate | Votes | % |
|---|---|---|---|
| Republican | Pat Roberts | 245,411 | 78.21% |
| Republican | Tom Little | 25,052 | 7.98% |
| Republican | Tom Oyler | 23,266 | 7.42% |
| Republican | Richard L. Cooley | 20,060 | 6.39% |
| Total votes | | 313,789 | 100.00% |

== General election ==
=== Candidates ===
- Mark Marney (Reform)
- Pat Roberts (R), U.S. Representative
- Steven Rosile (L)
- Sally Thompson (D), Kansas State Treasurer

=== Results ===
General election results
| Party | Candidate | Votes | % | ±% |
|---|---|---|---|---|
| Republican | Pat Roberts | 652,677 | 62.02% | −11.57% |
| Democratic | Sally Thompson | 362,380 | 34.44% | +8.05% |
| Reform | Mark S. Marney | 24,145 | 2.29% | |
| Libertarian | Steven Rosile | 13,098 | 1.25% | |
| Majority | | 290,297 | 27.59% | −19.61% |
| Turnout | | 1,052,300 | | |
| Republican hold | | Swing | | |

== See also ==
- 1996 United States Senate elections
