= Milton R. Wolf =

American physician

Milton Wolf

Personal details
- Born: April 8, 1971 (age 55) Lyons, Kansas, U.S.
- Party: Republican
- Spouse: Karrie Wolf
- Children: 2
- Education: University of Kansas (BS, MD)
- Website: Official website

Milton R. Wolf (born April 8, 1971) is an American physician. He is a Tea Party movement-aligned activist who ran against incumbent Kansas U.S. Senator Pat Roberts for the Republican Party nomination in the 2014 United States Senate election. On August 5, 2014, Wolf was defeated by Roberts. The final percentages were Roberts 48% and Wolf 41%.

Wolf is a board-certified radiologist and is President Barack Obama's second cousin, once removed. He has previously written for The Washington Times and has appeared as a conservative commentator on shows including Hannity, Fox & Friends, and The Rush Limbaugh Show.

== Policy positions ==
Wolf opposes the Affordable Care Act, also known as Obamacare, and promises to support efforts to repeal it and to oppose funding to implement it. Wolf instead has proposed patient-centered, free-market health-care reforms. Wolf has been very critical of U.S. Senator Pat Roberts for endorsing former Kansas Governor Kathleen Sebelius, a Democrat, to be United States Secretary of Health and Human Services.

Wolf has accused Roberts of bailing out Wall Street. Wolf has been critical of Roberts for supporting earmarks. Wolf is against using military force in Syria.

Wolf also opposes increasing the debt ceiling and has criticized Roberts for supporting raising the debt ceiling.

== Personal life ==
Wolf was born and raised in the small town of Lyons, Kansas, a farming community. He earned his undergraduate degree from the University of Kansas and his medical degree from University of Kansas School of Medicine. He did his internship at the Baptist Lutheran Medical Center in Kansas City, Missouri. He completed his residency at the University of Missouri–Kansas City which included time spent at Saint Luke's Hospital, Truman Medical Center, and Children's Mercy Hospital. He currently practices radiology in the Kansas City metropolitan area. Wolf is married and has two children.

In February 2014, the Topeka Capital-Journal reported that in January 2010, Milton Wolf had "posted a collection of gruesome X-ray images of gunshot fatalities and medical injuries to his Facebook page and participated in online commentary layered with macabre jokes and descriptions of carnage." The Kansas Board of Healing Arts is investigating the matter.

=== Obama familial relationship ===
Obama and Wolf are related through Thomas Creekmore McCurry (1850–1939), Former President Obama's great-great-grandfather, and Wolf's great-grandfather. Obama's grandmother, Madelyn Dunham, was Wolf's mother's first cousin. Obama's mother and Wolf's mother were friends in Wichita, Kansas, where the former president's mother, Ann Dunham, was born and spent part of her childhood.

== Electoral results ==
Republican primary results
Party	Candidate	Votes	%
Republican	Pat Roberts	125,306	48
Republican	Milton Wolf	106,128	41
Republican	D.J. Smith	15,057	6
Republican	Alvin E. Zahnter	13,935	5
Total votes		260,426	100.00
