= Joan Finney =

American politician (1925–2001)

42nd Governor of Kansas
- In office January 14, 1991 – January 9, 1995
- Lieutenant: Jim Francisco
- Preceded by: Mike Hayden
- Succeeded by: Bill Graves

33rd Kansas State Treasurer
- In office January 6, 1975 – January 14, 1991
- Governor: Robert Frederick Bennett; John W. Carlin; Mike Hayden
- Preceded by: Tom Van Sickle
- Succeeded by: Sally Thompson

Personal details
- Born: Joan Marie McInroy; February 12, 1925 Topeka, Kansas, U.S.
- Died: July 28, 2001 (aged 76) Topeka, Kansas, U.S.
- Party: Republican (Before 1974); Democratic (1974–2001)
- Spouse: Spencer Finney
- Education: Washburn University (BA)

Joan Marie Finney (née McInroy; February 12, 1925 – July 28, 2001) was an American politician who served as the 42nd governor of Kansas from 1991 to 1995. Prior to her tenure as governor, Finney served four terms as the Kansas state treasurer from 1975 to 1991. Finney was the first woman to hold either office.

== Early life ==
Finney was born Joan Marie McInroy in Topeka, Kansas. She was the daughter of Leonard and Mary Sands McInroy. Her father abandoned the family shortly after her birth. McInroy graduated from high school in Manhattan, Kansas in 1942.

In 1957, she married Spencer Finney, Jr. The Finneys had three children: Sarah "Sally" Finney Timm, Richard Finney, and Mary Finney Holladay. In 1978, Finney graduated from Washburn University with a bachelor's degree in economic history.

== Early political career ==
From 1953 to 1969, Finney served on the staff of Republican U.S. Senator Frank Carlson. From 1970 to 1972, she served as Commissioner of Elections for Shawnee County, Kansas. In 1972, she was an unsuccessful candidate in the Republican primary for a U.S. House seat in Kansas's 2nd congressional district.

She also served as a special assistant to Topeka Mayor Bill McCormick from 1973 to 1974.

After switching her political affiliation from Republican to Democrat, Finney served as Kansas State Treasurer from 1975 to 1991. She was the first woman to hold that position.

== Governorship ==
In the 1990 Democratic primary for governor of Kansas, Finney upset former Governor John W. Carlin. She then went on to defeat incumbent Republican Mike Hayden in the general election, becoming the first woman in U.S. history to defeat an incumbent governor in a general election.

In addition to being the State of Kansas's first female governor, Finney was the first Roman Catholic governor of Kansas. She was known for her pro-Native American stances and was one of the few anti-abortion Democratic governors of her time.

Finney served only one term as governor, retiring after the 1994 election.

== Post-governorship ==
In 1996, Finney ran for the U.S. Senate special election triggered by the resignation of Bob Dole. She was defeated in the Democratic primary by Jill Docking, who gained 74% of the primary vote, and subsequently lost the general election to U.S. Congressman Sam Brownback.

Finney died in 2001 from complications of liver cancer at St. Francis Hospital in Topeka. She is buried in Mount Calvary Cemetery in Topeka.

== See also ==
- List of female governors in the United States

Political offices
Preceded by Tom Van Sickle	Treasurer of Kansas; 1975–1991	Succeeded by Sally Thompson
Preceded by Mike Hayden	Governor of Kansas; 1991–1995	Succeeded by Bill Graves
Party political offices
Preceded by Marjorie L. Taylor	Democratic nominee for Treasurer of Kansas; 1974, 1976, 1978, 1982, 1986	Succeeded by Sally Thompson
Preceded by Thomas Docking	Democratic nominee for Governor of Kansas; 1990	Succeeded by Jim Slattery
