= Tom Van Sickle =

American politician

32nd Kansas State Treasurer
- In office January 8, 1973 – January 13, 1975
- Governor: Robert Docking
- Preceded by: Walter Peery
- Succeeded by: Joan Finney

Member of the Kansas Senate
- In office January 9, 1961 – January 8, 1973

Member of the Kansas House of Representatives
- In office January 12, 1959 – January 9, 1961

Personal details
- Born: June 22, 1937 Vernon County, Missouri
- Died: July 3, 2016 (aged 79) Olathe, Kansas
- Party: Republican

Tom Van Sickle (June 22, 1937 – July 3, 2016) was an American politician who served as the Treasurer of Kansas from 1973 to 1975. He previously served in Kansas House of Representatives from 1959 to 1961 and in the Kansas Senate from 1961 to 1973.

He died on July 3, 2016, in Olathe, Kansas at age 79.

Party political offices
| Preceded by Walter Peery | Republican nominee for Kansas State Treasurer; 1972 | Succeeded by Clay E. Hedrick |
| Preceded by Robert E. Hoffman | Republican nominee for Kansas Attorney General; 1974 | Succeeded by Robert Stephan |
