= Safe and Accurate Food Labeling Act of 2015 =

The Safe and Accurate Food Labeling Act (SAFL Act) was an American bill that died in 2016 but not before it influenced Public Law 114-214 in Committee. The purpose of both bills was to amend the Agricultural Marketing Act of 1946. The competitor legislation was signed into law by President Obama on 29 July 2016.

== 2015: House Resolution ==
Originally sponsored by Mike Pompeo on 23 March 2015, the SAFL Act as (H.R. 1599) passed the House of Representatives on July 23, 2015.

The bill was received in the Senate on 24 July 2015 and referred to the Committee on Agriculture, Nutrition, and Forestry. The bill died on the order paper when the first session of the 114th Congress ended. The dead bill would have required food producers to notify FDA of any bioengineered foods intended to be sold interstate and would prevent the sale any bioengineered foods not deemed safe by the federal agency.

It competed against Senate bill S.744 in the 114th Congress, which was deceptively entitled "AN ACT To reauthorize and amend the National Sea Grant College Program Act, and for other purposes." That bill, when it originated as just "AN ACT To reauthorize and amend the National Sea Grant College Program Act" was sponsored by a bipartisan team, however the Democratic co-sponsors (Cantwell and Schatz) withdrew their support on 15 March 2016, after Pat Roberts introduced his GMO Foods bill and it became apparent that the Republicans intended to tack on his bill "for other purposes" to Public Law 114-214.The primary sponsor was Roger Wicker. On 7 July 2016, the reauthorization passed the Senate, and on 14 July it passed the House of Representatives. On 29 July 2016, President Obama signed bill S.744 (114th) into law. It amended the Agricultural Marketing Act of 1946.
