= Sally Thompson =

American politician

Chief financial officer of the United States Department of Agriculture
- In office March 2, 1998 – January 20, 2001
- President: Bill Clinton
- Preceded by: Anthony A. Williams
- Succeeded by: Edward R. McPherson

34th Treasurer of Kansas
- In office January 14, 1991 – February 27, 1998
- Governor: Joan Finney; Bill Graves
- Preceded by: Joan Finney
- Succeeded by: Clyde Graeber

Personal details
- Born: February 17, 1940 (age 86) Spokane, Washington
- Party: Democratic

Sally Thompson (born February 17, 1940) is an American politician who served as the Treasurer of Kansas from 1991 to 1998 and as the Chief financial officer of the United States Department of Agriculture from 1998 to 2001.

Party political offices
Preceded by Dick Williams	Democratic nominee for U.S. Senator from Kansas (Class 2); 1996	Vacant Title next held by Jim Slattery
