= 1990 Kansas gubernatorial election =

- November 6, 1990
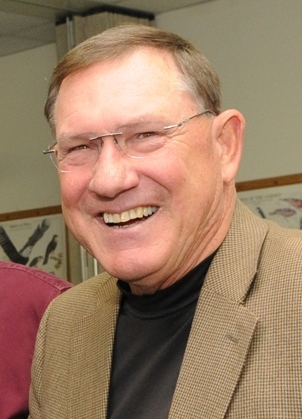

Nominee	Joan Finney	Mike Hayden	Christina Campbell-Cline
Party	Democratic	Republican	Independent
Running mate	Jim Francisco	Harland Priddle	Tim Benton
Popular vote	380,609	333,589	69,127
Percentage	48.59%	42.59%	8.82%
- County results Finney: 40–50% 50–60% 60–70% 70–80% Hayden: 40–50% 50–60% 60–70% 70–80%
Governor before election
Mike Hayden
Republican
Elected Governor
Joan Finney
Democratic

The 1990 Kansas gubernatorial election took place on November 6, 1990. Incumbent Republican Governor Mike Hayden lost re-election to Democratic nominee Joan Finney.

The State Treasurer at the time, Finney was elected governor over Hayden in 1990, giving Hayden the distinction of being the first incumbent governor of any state to lose to a woman. In addition to being Kansas's first female governor, she was Kansas' oldest governor at the age of 65 until Laura Kelly took office at the age of 68 in 2019, Kansas' first Roman Catholic Governor, and one of the few anti-abortion Democratic Governors at the time.

As of 2026, this was the last time in which an incumbent Kansas Governor lost a general election.

== Background ==
Hayden was chosen as chair of the Republican Governors Association. His term saw tax cuts and programs to combat substance abuse. A split in the Kansas Republican Party between moderates and conservatives considerably reduced other accomplishments. He was perceived as a moderate; on abortion, for instance, he took a pro-choice position. Because of the legislative gridlock, he did not reinstate the death penalty.

It is speculated that Hayden lost his re-election bid primarily because of voter passage of a property reclassification amendment in Kansas which resulted in property reappraisals – the first in some cases in 20 years – and the resulting property tax increases when market values were applied to properties for tax purposes.

== Candidates ==
=== Republican ===
- Mike Hayden, incumbent Governor

=== Democratic ===
- Joan Finney, State Treasurer
- John W. Carlin, former Governor

=== Independent ===
- Christina Campbell-Cline, CPA

== General election ==
=== Results ===
Kansas gubernatorial election, 1990
Party	Candidate	Votes	%	±%
Democratic	Joan Finney	380,609	48.59%	+0.49%
Republican	Mike Hayden (incumbent)	333,589	42.59%	−9.31%
Independent	Christina Campbell-Cline	69,127	8.82%	N/A
Total votes		783,325	100.00%	N/A
Democratic gain from Republican				
