= 2002 United States Senate election in Kansas =

- November 5, 2002
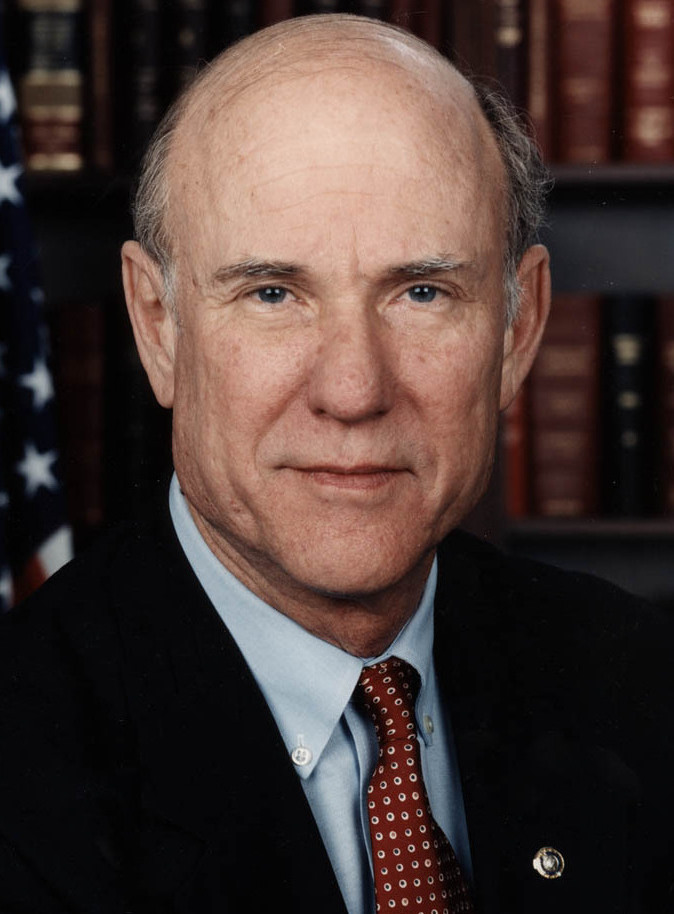

Nominee	Pat Roberts	Steven Rosile	George Cook
Party	Republican	Libertarian	Reform
Popular vote	641,075	70,725	65,050
Percentage	82.52%	9.10%	8.37%
- County results Roberts: 50–60% 70–80% 80–90% >90%
U.S. senator before election
Pat Roberts
Republican
Elected U.S. Senator
Pat Roberts
Republican

The 2002 United States Senate election in Kansas was held on November 4, 2002. Incumbent Republican U.S. Senator Pat Roberts won re-election to a second term overwhelmingly. No Democrats filed to run, and Roberts was only opposed by a Libertarian candidate and a Reform Party candidate. This was the only United States Senate election in Kansas in which Pat Roberts won every county in the state.

== Republican primary ==
=== Candidates ===
- Tom Oyler, perennial candidate
- Pat Roberts, incumbent U.S. Senator

=== Results ===
Republican primary results
Party	Candidate	Votes	%
Republican	Pat Roberts (incumbent)	233,642	83.70%
Republican	Tom Oyler	45,491	16.30%
Total votes		279,133	100.00%

== General election ==
County Flips: Republican Hold Flip

=== Candidates ===
- George Cook (Re)
- Pat Roberts (R), incumbent U.S. Senator
- Steven Rosile (L)

=== Predictions ===
Source	Ranking	As of
Sabato's Crystal Ball	Safe R	November 4, 2002

=== Results ===
General election results
Party	Candidate	Votes	%	±%
Republican	Pat Roberts (incumbent)	641,075	82.52%	+20.50%
Libertarian	Steven Rosile	70,725	9.10%	+7.86%
Reform	George Cook	65,050	8.37%	+6.08%
Majority		570,350	73.42%	+45.83%
Turnout		776,850		
Republican hold		Swing		

==== Counties that flipped from Democratic to Republican ====
- Wyandotte (largest city: Kansas City)

== See also ==
- 2002 United States Senate election
