= Stanley, Kansas =

Neighborhood in Johnson County, Kansas, US

Coordinates: 38°51′16″N 94°39′57″W

Stanley is a neighborhood in Johnson County, Kansas, which previously had the status of an unincorporated community before being absorbed by the larger Overland Park in 1985. It is part of the Kansas City metropolitan area.
