= Pat Roberts =

American politician and journalist (born 1936)

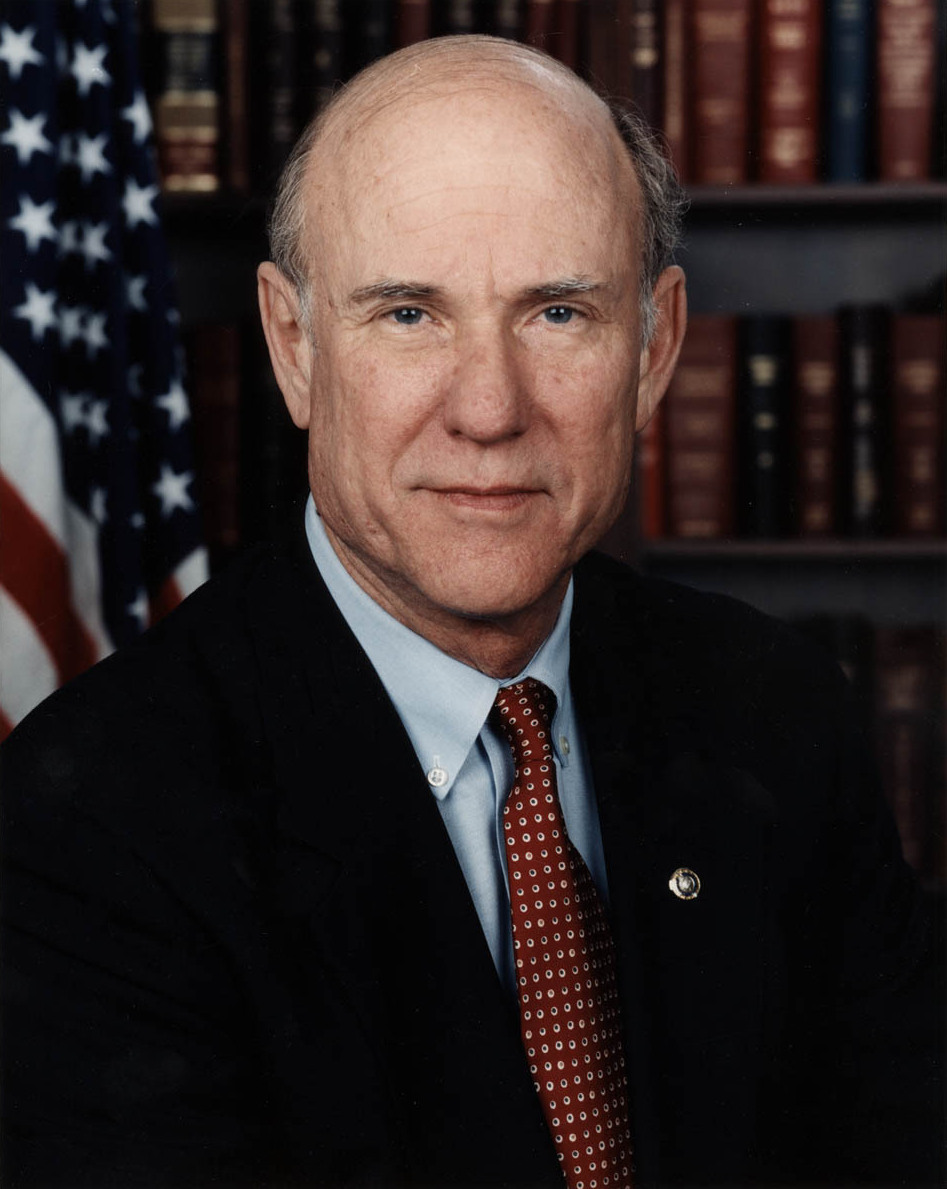
- Official portrait, 2009

United States Senator from Kansas
- In office January 3, 1997 – January 3, 2021
- Preceded by: Nancy Kassebaum
- Succeeded by: Roger Marshall
Senate positions
Chair of the Senate Agriculture Committee
In office January 3, 2015 – January 3, 2021
Preceded by	Debbie Stabenow
Succeeded by	Debbie Stabenow
Ranking Member of the Senate Agriculture Committee
In office January 3, 2011 – January 3, 2013
Preceded by	Saxby Chambliss
Succeeded by	Thad Cochran
Chair of the Senate Intelligence Committee
In office January 3, 2003 – January 3, 2007
Preceded by	Bob Graham
Succeeded by	Jay Rockefeller
Chair of the Senate Ethics Committee
In office January 20, 2001 – June 6, 2001
Preceded by	Harry Reid
Succeeded by	Harry Reid
In office November 19, 1999 – January 3, 2001
Preceded by	Bob Smith
Succeeded by	Harry Reid
Ranking Member of the Senate Ethics Committee
In office June 6, 2001 – January 3, 2003
Preceded by	Harry Reid
Succeeded by	Harry Reid
In office January 3, 2001 – January 20, 2001
Preceded by	Harry Reid
Succeeded by	Harry Reid

Member of the U.S. House of Representatives from Kansas's 1st district
- In office January 3, 1981 – January 3, 1997
- Preceded by: Keith Sebelius
- Succeeded by: Jerry Moran
House positions
Chair of the House Agriculture Committee
In office January 3, 1995 – January 3, 1997
Preceded by	Kika de la Garza
Succeeded by	Robert Smith
Ranking Member of the House Agriculture Committee
In office January 3, 1993 – January 3, 1995
Preceded by	Tom Coleman
Succeeded by	Kika de la Garza

Personal details
- Born: Charles Patrick Roberts; April 20, 1936 (age 90) Topeka, Kansas, U.S.
- Party: Republican
- Spouse: Franki Fann (m. 1969)
- Children: 3
- Education: Kansas State University (BA)

Military service
- Branch/service: United States Marine Corps
- Years of service: 1958–1962
- Rank: First Lieutenant
- Roberts's voice Roberts opening a Senate Intelligence Committee hearing on post-9/11 intelligence community restructuring. Recorded July 20, 2004

Charles Patrick Roberts (born April 20, 1936) is a retired American politician and journalist who served as a United States senator from Kansas from 1997 to 2021. A member of the Republican Party, Roberts served 8 terms in the U.S. House of Representatives, from 1981 to 1997, before his election to the Senate.

Born in Topeka, Kansas, Roberts is a graduate of Kansas State University. He served as a First Lieutenant in the U.S. Marine Corps and worked as a newspaper reporter before entering politics in the late 1960s. He was elected to the U.S. House of Representatives in 1980 to succeed 1st District Congressman Keith Sebelius, for whom he had worked. He served eight terms in the House, including one as chairman of the House Agriculture Committee.

Roberts was first elected to the U.S. Senate in 1996. On the Intelligence Committee, he was responsible for an investigation into the intelligence failures prior to the 2003 invasion of Iraq. He was the dean of Kansas's congressional delegation and Chairman of the Senate Agriculture, Nutrition and Forestry Committee (ANF). He is the first person to chair both the House and the Senate agriculture committees.

On January 4, 2019, Roberts announced that he would not seek reelection in 2020. He was succeeded by Representative Roger Marshall of Great Bend on January 3, 2021.

== Early life, education, and early political career ==
Roberts was born on April 20, 1936, in Topeka, Kansas, the son of Ruth B. (née Patrick) and C. Wesley Roberts. His father served for four months as Chairman of the Republican National Committee under Dwight D. Eisenhower. Roberts's great-grandfather, J.W. Roberts, was the founder of the Oskaloosa Independent, which is the second-oldest newspaper in Kansas.

Roberts graduated in 1954 from Holton High School in Holton, Kansas. He went on to earn a Bachelor of Arts degree in journalism from Kansas State University in 1958, where he became a member of the Pi Kappa Alpha fraternity. From 1958 to 1962, he served as an officer in the U.S. Marine Corps, achieving the rank of First Lieutenant. Roberts was a reporter and editor for several Arizona newspapers between 1962 and 1967, when he joined the staff of Republican Kansas Senator Frank Carlson. In 1969, he became administrative assistant to Kansas's 1st District Congressman Keith Sebelius.

== U.S. House of Representatives (1981–1997) ==
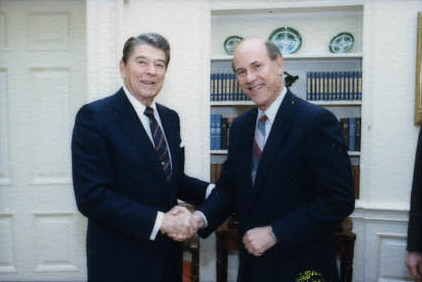
Roberts (right) with President Ronald Reagan in 1988

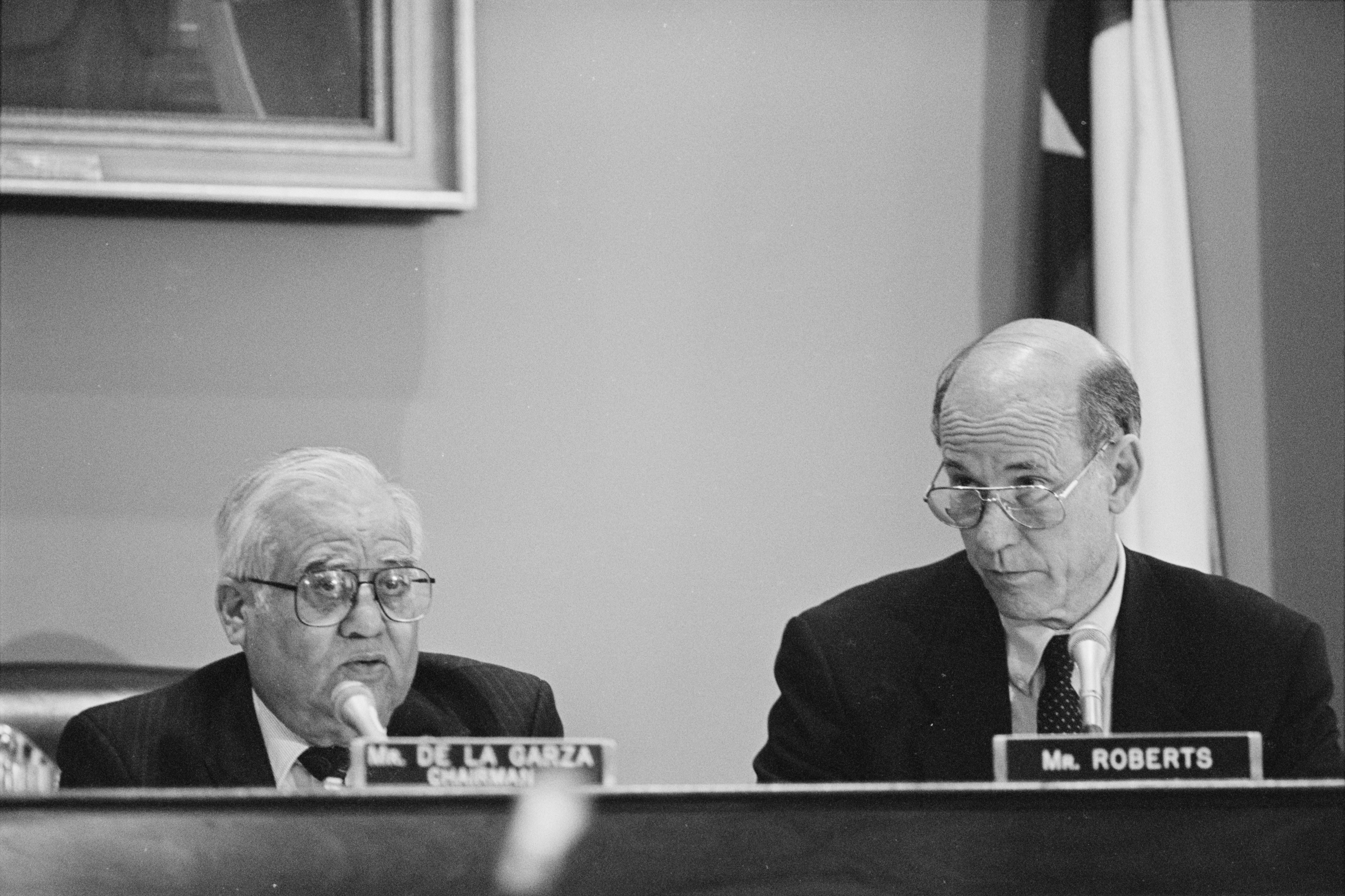
Roberts and Kika de la Garza at a House Agriculture Committee meeting in 1994

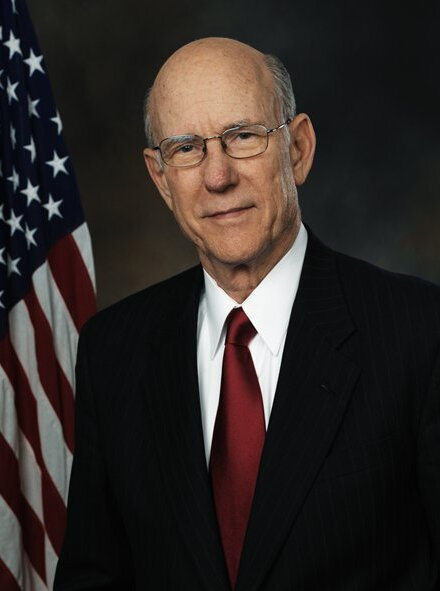
Senator Roberts in 2005

=== Elections ===
After Keith Sebelius announced his retirement, Roberts easily won the Republican primary, which was tantamount to election in the heavily Republican 1st District. He was re-elected seven times without serious difficulty, never receiving less than 60 percent of the vote; in 1988, he ran unopposed.

=== Committee assignments ===
Roberts served as the chairman of the House Agriculture Committee from 1995 to 1997.

=== Sponsored Legislation that became Law ===
- Public Law 99-624: Dwight David Eisenhower Centennial Commission Act
- Public Law 101-353: To designate the Agricultural Research Service, U.S. Department of Agriculture, animal health research building in Clay Center, Nebraska, as the "Virginia D. Smith Animal Health Research Laboratory"
- Public Law 104-107: Federal Agriculture Improvement and Reform Act of 1996

== U.S. Senate (1997–2021) ==
=== Elections ===
==== 1996 ====
After Republican Senator Nancy Kassebaum declined to seek a fourth term, Roberts ran to succeed her. He easily won the Republican primary, defeating three minor candidates with 78% of the vote. In the general election, he faced Democratic State Treasurer Sally Thompson. Term limits were an issue during the campaign; while Roberts said he was not totally opposed to term limits, he was wary of limits that did not apply to current members of Congress, saying the proposed limits should apply to everyone. While Thompson signed the national term limits pledge from the group Americans for Limited Terms, Roberts declined to do so, becoming the only major party candidate for the U.S. Senate in the 1996 elections to not sign the pledge. However, he did say that "I plan only to serve two terms in the U.S. Senate." Despite that stated intention, he eventually served four terms.

In the general election, Roberts defeated Thompson by 652,677 votes (62.02%) to 362,380 (34.44%), almost certainly helped by the presence of former Kansas Senator Bob Dole atop the ticket as the Republican presidential nominee.

==== 2002 ====
Roberts was opposed in the Republican primary by Tom Oyler, who had run against him in 1996. Roberts defeated him 84% to 16%. No Democratic candidate opposed him in the general election; he faced only Libertarian nominee Steven Rosile and Reform nominee George H. Cook, defeating them by 641,075 votes (82.52%) to 70,725 (9.10%) and 65,050 (8.37%), respectively.

==== 2008 ====
Roberts was unopposed in the Republican primary and defeated the Democratic nominee, former Congressman Jim Slattery, in the general election by 727,121 votes (60.06%) to 441,399 (36.46%).

==== 2014 ====
In the 2014 election, Roberts faced a hard-fought primary challenge from physician Milton R. Wolf. Wolf received several endorsements from national organizations associated with the Tea Party movement. Roberts defeated Wolf in the Republican primary by 125,406 votes (48.12%) to 106,202 (40.75%). In the general election, for the second time in his tenure, Roberts did not face a Democratic opponent; Democratic nominee Chad Taylor withdrew from the race. Roberts won the general election, obtaining 53.15% of the vote; Independent Greg Orman received 42.53%, while Libertarian nominee Randall Batson received 4.32%.

=== Tenure ===
Despite being the longest-serving member of the Kansas delegation, Roberts spent the first 14 years of his Senate career as Kansas's junior senator, since Sam Brownback had taken office on election day 1996 to finish out Dole's term. However, after Brownback gave up his seat to make a successful run for governor, Roberts became Kansas's senior senator.

Roberts was a senior member of the Senate Armed Services Committee, chairing the Subcommittee on Emerging Threats and Capabilities. This subcommittee oversaw the military's work in the area of homeland security and the efforts to prevent proliferation of nuclear, chemical, and biological weapons.

After winning the 2008 Presidential election, Barack Obama nominated Tom Daschle for United States Secretary of Health and Human Services. In February, after Daschle offered a public apology for his failure to pay income taxes on use of a luxury car and driver, Roberts declined to state his opinion of Daschle's explanation and stated that sentiment for the nomination in Kansas was "not especially good". Daschle subsequently withdrew.

In March 2009, Roberts was one of fourteen senators to vote against a procedural move that essentially guaranteed a major expansion of a national service corps. The bill was estimated by the Congressional Budget Office to cost at least an outlay for the fiscal year 2010 of $418 million toward around $5.7 billion from 2010 through 2014.

In May 2009, President Obama nominated Sonia Sotomayor for Supreme Court Associate Justice. Roberts had previously voted against Sotomayor with twenty-eight other Republicans when she was nominated for the Second Circuit Court of Appeals. In an interview shortly after the nomination, Roberts was asked if he would vote for Sotomayor to avoid being called a "bigot" and answered, "I’m a Marine and nothing much scares me. That's not going to be a consideration in my vote." Roberts stated his reasons for voting against Sotomayor in 1998 in a separate interview, and that he did "not plan to vote for her". Roberts's comments were significant for his being the first Republican to announce how he would vote on the Sotomayor nomination. Sotomayor was confirmed in August in a vote of 68 to 31 with Roberts voting against the nomination.

President Obama's top domestic agenda at the start of his presidency was to ensure health insurance for all Americans, which entailed Democrats in Congress scaling back their proposals in attempts to trim tens of billions of dollars a year from existing health programs. Roberts pushed back against a proposal by the Obama administration to use $600 billion of Medicare and Medicaid savings to pay for health care legislation, saying, "More cuts to Medicare? Let’s not do that right now, please."

Roberts rose to the Chair of the Committee on ANF in the 2014-2016 114th Congress. He continued to chair the Committee for the duration of his tenure in the 115th Congress and the 116th Congress.

In June 2016, the "Roberts GMO bill" which had come out of the Committee on ANF was proposed as an amendment to Public Law 114-214 by Mitch McConnell. Public Law 114-214 was also known to opponents as the DARK Act, for "Deny Americans the Right to Know" about GMO foods.

In February 2019, when asked about comments by House Agriculture Committee Chairman Collin Peterson regarding the passage of the reauthorization of the Commodity Futures Trading Commission and the Pesticide Registration Enhancement Act, Roberts stated his support for both, and in passing child nutrition reauthorization legislation.

Roberts served as chairman of the Dwight D. Eisenhower Memorial Commission, dedicating the memorial on September 17, 2020, after many years of planning.

In September 2020, with less than two months to the next presidential election, Roberts supported an immediate vote on President Trump's nominee to fill the Supreme Court vacancy caused by the death of justice Ruth Bader Ginsburg. Roberts argued that it was the "Senate’s constitutional duty to fill vacancies on the Supreme Court". Previously in March 2016, around seven months before the next presidential election, Roberts argued that President Obama's Supreme Court nominee should not be considered by the Senate, as the process would be "rushed", and that this was "about giving the American people and the next president a role in selecting the next Supreme Court justice" via the upcoming presidential election.

=== Agriculture Committee attendance ===
During his tenure in the Senate, Roberts missed 130 (65%) of his Agriculture Committee meetings. The Agriculture Committee is responsible for farm, nutrition and forestry issues.

=== Controversy ===
While participating in negotiations over the Republican-sponsored American Healthcare Act, Roberts was asked by Alice Ollstein if he supported a proposed revision to mandated coverage in the bill. He responded: "I wouldn't want to lose my mammograms." This comment was widely condemned. Roberts subsequently apologized.

=== Sponsored legislation ===
- Public Law 108-144: A bill to designate the facility of the United States Postal Service located at 3710 West 73rd Terrace in Prairie Village, Kansas, as the "Senator James B. Pearson Post Office"
- Public Law 108-207: An original bill to extend the final report date and termination date of the 9/11 Commission, to provide additional funding for the Commission, and for other purposes
- Public Law 109-17: A bill to amend the Agricultural Credit Act of 1987 to reauthorize State mediation programs
- Public Law 109-299: Wichita Project Equus Beds Division Authorization Act of 2005
- Public Law 115-60: Bob Dole Congressional Gold Medal Act
- Public Law 115-162: A bill to designate the facility of the United States Postal Service located at 621 Kansas Avenue in Atchison, Kansas, as the "Amelia Earhart Post Office Building"

=== Committee assignments ===
- Committee on Agriculture, Nutrition, and Forestry (Chairman during 114-116th Congresses)
  - Subcommittee on Energy, Science and Technology
  - Subcommittee on Domestic and Foreign Marketing, Inspection, and Plant and Animal Health
  - Subcommittee on Production, Income Protection and Price Support
- Committee on Finance
  - Subcommittee on Taxation, IRS Oversight, and Long-term Growth
  - Subcommittee on Social Security, Pensions, and Family Policy
  - Subcommittee on International Trade, Customs, and Global Competitiveness
- Committee on Health, Education, Labor, and Pensions
  - Subcommittee on Children and Families
- Select Committee on Ethics
- Committee on Rules & Administration

=== Caucuses ===
Senate Republican Conference

== Political positions ==
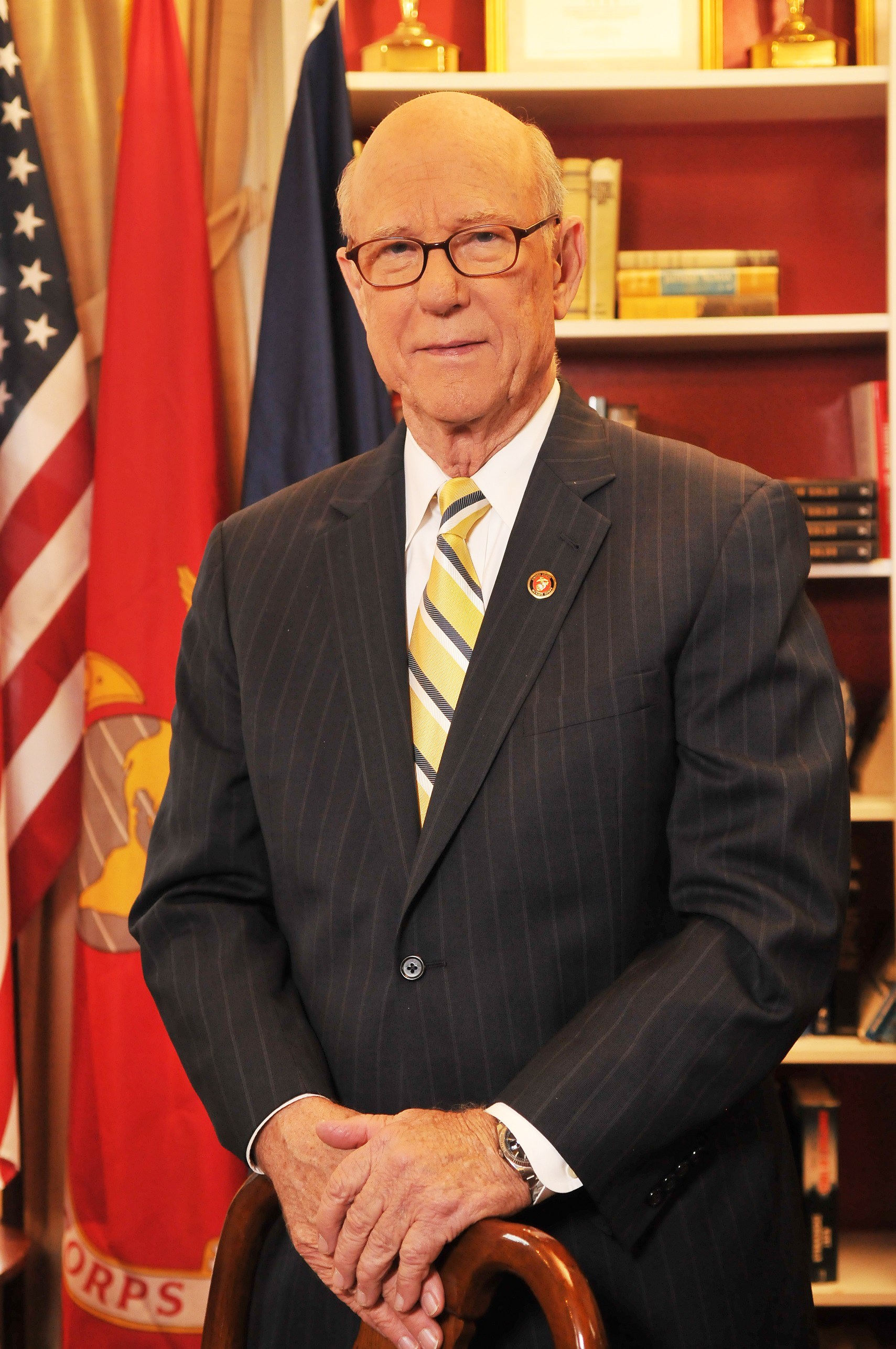
Official portrait, 2015

=== Social issues ===
Roberts is anti-abortion, opposes same-sex marriage, and denied Americans the right to know about GMO foods as part of Public Law 114-214.

==== Healthcare and Obamacare ====
Roberts opposed President Barack Obama's health reform legislation; he voted against the Affordable Care Act in December 2009, and he voted against the Health Care and Education Reconciliation Act of 2010. In September 2017, Roberts supported the Graham-Cassidy healthcare bill. When interviewed about why he supported it, Roberts repeatedly refused to say why he thought the bill was good, and avoided speaking about the bill's policy contents. Instead, he said he supported the bill because it was the last best chance to repeal Obamacare.

==== GMO foods law ====
Roberts introduced a biotech labeling and GMO foods bill on February 19, 2016. The bill aims to establish a standardized voluntary labeling plan that would block the state of Vermont from enacting its mandatory genetic engineering labeling law on July 1 of that year. In addition it seeks to promote "consumer acceptance of agricultural biotechnology". The Roberts GMO bill was supported by the Grocery Manufacturers of America, the Food & Agriculture, Biotechnology Innovation Organization, the American Bakers Association, the International Dairy Foods Association, and the Snack Food Association amongst others in the face of the opposition for more than a decade of more than 90% of the public. It was noted that the World Health Organization, the American Medical Association, the National Academy of Sciences and "the concerted advocacy of 107 concerned Nobel laureates" all were in favor of GMO foods. The fait accompli fallacy was used by a writer for National Geographic to conclude her article in favor of the Roberts bill, whereas labeling of GMO food is mandated in at least 64 countries, including most European countries, China, Russia, Japan, Brazil, South Africa, and Australia.

The bill was engrossed into Public Law 114-214. At the time, Vermont governor Peter Shumlin said that "For a Republican-controlled Congress that continually argues for states’ rights to act to take away Vermonters’ right to know what is in their food is the height of hypocrisy and a sad statement on the power of special interests in Congress." An environmental advocacy organization said that "the food lobby spent over $100 million in the fight to block GMO labeling in 2015".

President Obama signed the bill into law on July 29, 2016.

==== Environment ====
Roberts worked to secure $15 million for research on carbon sequestration. On the topic of global warming, Roberts has said, "There's no question there's some global warming, but I'm not sure what it means. A lot of this is condescending elitism."

Roberts voted to confirm Gale Norton as U.S. Secretary of the Interior, to exclude oil and gas smokestacks from mercury regulations, and to reclassify the Environmental Protection Agency (EPA) as a Cabinet department.

In 2012, Roberts introduced an amendment that would open up the Arctic National Wildlife Refuge to drilling for oil and approve the Keystone XL Pipeline.

In 2017, Roberts was one of 22 senators to sign a letter to President Donald Trump urging the President to have the United States withdraw from the Paris Agreement. According to OpenSecrets, Roberts has received over $415,000 from oil, gas and coal interests since 2012.

==== Education ====
In January 2014, Roberts introduced the Opportunities Created At the Local Level Act, a bill that would allow states to freely choose without federal intervention in their education standards, testing and curricula.

In February 2019, Roberts was one of 20 senators to sponsor the Employer Participation in Repayment Act, enabling employers to contribute up to $5,250 to the student loans of their employees as a means of granting employees relief and incentivizing applicants to apply to jobs with employers who implement the policy.

==== Domestic security ====
Roberts supports the Patriot Act, and the President's authority for warrantless surveillance. Roberts was the only senator blocking the nomination of Army Secretary Eric Fanning. Roberts's refusal to lift his hold on the nomination until President Obama promised to never move anyone from the Guantanamo Bay detention camp to Fort Leavenworth drew criticism on the Senate floor from Armed Services Committee Chairman John McCain, who noted that the United States Secretary of the Army has no control over the detainees.

==== Intelligence program ====
The 2004 Intelligence Authorization Act saw the creation of the Pat Roberts Intelligence Scholars Program. The program links undergraduate and graduate students with US security and intelligence agencies" by providing funding to selected US students entering university, in return for a commitment to join the agency for at least 18 months on graduation. PRISP is a decentralized program which funds students through various intelligence agencies.

==== Investigation into pre-war intelligence on Iraq ====
As chairman of the U.S. Senate Select Committee on Intelligence, Roberts was responsible for the committee's investigation into the intelligence failures prior to the 2003 invasion of Iraq. The first half of the Senate Report of Pre-war Intelligence on Iraq was released on July 9, 2004. The second half, according to language voted on by the full Committee, consists of five parts including: whether public statements and reports and testimony regarding Iraq by U.S. Government officials made between the Gulf War period and the commencement of Operation Iraqi Freedom were substantiated by intelligence information; the postwar findings about Iraq's weapons of mass destruction and weapons programs and links to terrorism and how they compare with prewar assessments; prewar intelligence assessments about postwar Iraq; any intelligence activities relating to Iraq conducted by the Policy Counterterrorism Evaluation Group (PCTEG) and the Office of Special Plans within the Office of the Under Secretary of Defense for Policy; and the use by the Intelligence Community of information provided by the Iraqi National Congress (INC).

==== Immigration ====
A member of the House of Representatives at the time, Roberts voted against Ronald Reagan's 1986 immigration limited amnesty bill.

In June 2018, Roberts was one of 13 Republican senators to sign a letter to U.S. Attorney General Jeff Sessions requesting a moratorium on the Trump administration family separation policy while Congress drafted legislation. He is in favor of increasing border patrols to reduce undocumented immigrant flow.

==== Net neutrality ====
In May 2018, Roberts voted against a bill that would reinstate net neutrality rules and thereby overturn the FCC's repeal via a law authorizing Congress to reverse regulatory actions by a simple majority vote.

==== Taxes ====
In March 2019, Roberts was a cosponsor of a bipartisan bill to undo a drafting error in the Tax Cuts and Jobs Act that mandated stores and restaurants to have to write off the costs of renovations over the course of 39 years via authorizing businesses to immediately deduct the entirety of costs of renovations.

==== United States Postal Service ====
In March 2019, Roberts was a cosponsor of a bipartisan resolution led by Gary Peters and Jerry Moran that opposed privatization of the United States Postal Service (USPS), citing the USPS as an establishment that was self-sustained and noting concerns that a potential privatization could cause higher prices and reduced services for customers of USPS with a particular occurrence in rural communities.

=== Gun law ===
Roberts has an "A" grade from the National Rifle Association (NRA) for his consistent, ongoing support of pro-gun legislation. The NRA endorsed Roberts in the 2014 election; the NRA-Political Victory Fund chairman said, "Pat is the only ally and battle-tested candidate in this race who has consistently protected our Second Amendment freedoms." Since 1998, the NRA has provided Roberts $23,800 in donations.

One month after the Orlando nightclub shooting, Roberts voted for two Republican-backed proposals on gun policy: Chuck Grassley's amendment to increase funding for background checks and John Cornyn's policy that would have put a 72-hour hold on any terrorist suspect buying a gun. He voted against both the Democrat's policies, including the Feinstein Amendment, which banned suspected terrorists from buying guns. Roberts voted against the Manchin-Toomey amendment to expand background checks for gun purchases.

In the immediate aftermath of the 2017 Las Vegas shooting, Roberts said it was "too early" to discuss gun policy change.

In February 2018, after the Stoneman Douglas High School shooting in which 17 were killed, Roberts came out in favor of age limits on the AR-15, the weapon used at the high school shooting. Roberts said, "Certainly nobody under 21 should have an AR-15. I don't know why anybody would want an AR-15 unless they're going to take one out on the shooting range."

In January 2019, Roberts was one of 31 Republican senators to cosponsor the Constitutional Concealed Carry Reciprocity Act, a bill introduced by John Cornyn and Ted Cruz which would grant individuals with concealed carry privileges in their home state the right to exercise this right in any other state with concealed carry laws while concurrently abiding by that state's laws.

=== Foreign policy ===
In December 2010, Roberts voted against the ratification of New START, a nuclear arms reduction treaty between the United States and Russian Federation obliging both countries to have no more than 1,550 strategic warheads as well as 700 launchers deployed during the next seven years along with providing a continuation of on-site inspections that halted when START I expired the previous year. It was the first arms treaty with Russia in eight years.

In September 2016, Roberts was one of 34 senators to sign a letter to U.S. Secretary of State John Kerry advocating for the United States using "all available tools to dissuade Russia from continuing its airstrikes in Syria that are clearly not in our interest" and saying there should be clear enforcement by the US of the airstrikes violating "a legally binding Security Council Resolution".

In June 2017, Roberts voted against a resolution by Rand Paul and Chris Murphy that would block President Trump's $510 million sale of precision-guided munitions to Saudi Arabia which made up a portion of the $110 billion arms sale Trump announced during his visit to Saudi Arabia the previous year.

In March 2018, Roberts voted to table a resolution spearheaded by Bernie Sanders, Chris Murphy, and Mike Lee that would have required President Trump to withdraw American troops either in or influencing Yemen within the next thirty days unless they were combating Al-Qaeda.

In July 2019, Roberts was one of 16 Republican senators to send a letter to Acting Office of Management and Budget (OMB) Director Russell Vought, Acting White House Chief of Staff Mick Mulvaney, and Treasury Secretary Steven Mnuchin encouraging them to work with them to prevent a continuing resolution "for FY 2020 that would delay the implementation of the President's National Defense Strategy (NDS) and increase costs" and that the year long continuing resolution suggested by administration officials would render the Defense Department "incapable of increasing readiness, recapitalizing our force, or rationalizing funding to align with the National Defense Strategy (NDS)".

== Personal life ==
Roberts married Franki Fann in 1969. The couple has three adult children: David, Ashleigh, and Anne-Wesley.

Roberts lives in Alexandria, Virginia. The New York Times reported that the house Roberts claimed as his residence in Dodge City, Kansas, is actually owned and occupied by campaign contributors C. Duane and Phyllis Ross.

== Electoral history ==
2014 United States Senate election in Kansas

Pat Roberts (R) (inc.) 53.3%
Greg Orman (Ind.) 42.4%
Randall Batson (Lib.) 4.3%

United States Senate Republican Primary election in Kansas, 2014

Pat Roberts (R) (inc.) 48%
Milton Wolf (R) 40.7%
D.J. Smith (R) 5.7%
Alvin Zahnter (R) 5.3%

2008 United States Senate election in Kansas

Pat Roberts (R) (inc.) 60%
Jim Slattery (D) 36%

2002 United States Senate election in Kansas

Pat Roberts (R) (inc.) 82.5%
Steven Rosile (Lib.) 9.1%
George Cook (Reform) 8.4%

United States Senate Republican Primary election in Kansas, 2002

Pat Roberts (R) (inc.) 83.7%
Tom Oyler (R) 16.3%

1996 United States Senate election in Kansas

Pat Roberts (R) 62%
Sally Thompson (D) 34.4%
Mark S. Marney (Reform) 2.3%
Steven Rosile (Lib.) 1.2%

United States Senate Republican Primary election in Kansas, 1996

Pat Roberts (R) 78.2%
Tom Little (R) 8%
Thomas Oyler (R) 7.4%
Richard Cooley (R) 6.4%

1994 Kansas 1st District United States Congressional Election

Pat Roberts (R) (inc.) 77%
Terry L. Nichols (D) 23%

1992 Kansas 1st District United States Congressional Election

Pat Roberts (R) (inc.) 68%
Duane West (D) 29%
Steven Rosile (L) 2%

1990 Kansas 1st District United States Congressional Election

Pat Roberts (R) (inc.) 62%
Duane West (D) 37%

1988 Kansas 1st District United States Congressional Election

Pat Roberts (R) (inc.) 100%

1986 Kansas 1st District United States Congressional Election

Pat Roberts (R) (inc.) 76.5%
Dale Lyon (D) 23.5%

1980 Kansas 1st District United States Congressional Election

Pat Roberts (R) 62%
Phil Martin (D) 38%

== See also ==
- Kansas's congressional delegations

== Notes and references ==
U.S. House of Representatives
Preceded by Keith Sebelius	Member of the U.S. House of Representatives from Kansas's 1st congressional district 1981–1997	Succeeded by Jerry Moran
Preceded by Tom Coleman	Ranking Member of the House Agriculture Committee; 1993–1995	Succeeded by Kika de la Garza
Preceded by Kika de la Garza	Chair of the House Agriculture Committee; 1995–1997	Succeeded by Robert Smith
Party political offices
Preceded by Nancy Landon Kassebaum	Republican nominee for U.S. Senator from Kansas (Class 2); 1996, 2002, 2008, 2014	Succeeded by Roger Marshall
U.S. Senate
Preceded by Nancy Kassebaum	U.S. Senator (Class 2) from Kansas; 1997–2021; Served alongside: Sam Brownback, Jerry Moran	Succeeded by Roger Marshall
Preceded by Bob Smith	Chair of the Senate Ethics Committee; 1999–2001	Succeeded by Harry Reid
Preceded by Harry Reid	Ranking Member of the Senate Ethics Committee; 2001–2003	Succeeded by Harry Reid
Preceded by Bob Graham	Chair of the Senate Intelligence Committee; 2003–2007	Succeeded by Jay Rockefeller
Preceded by Saxby Chambliss	Ranking Member of the Senate Agriculture Committee; 2011–2013	Succeeded by Thad Cochran
Preceded by Lamar Alexander	Ranking Member of the Senate Rules Committee; 2013–2015	Succeeded by Chuck Schumer
Preceded by Debbie Stabenow	Chair of the Senate Agriculture Committee; 2015–2021	Succeeded by Debbie Stabenow
U.S. order of precedence (ceremonial)
Preceded by Barbara Boxer as Former U.S. Senator	Order of precedence of the United States as Former U.S. Senator	Succeeded by Kay Bailey Hutchison as Former U.S. Senator
