= 2014 United States Senate election in Kansas =

- November 4, 2014
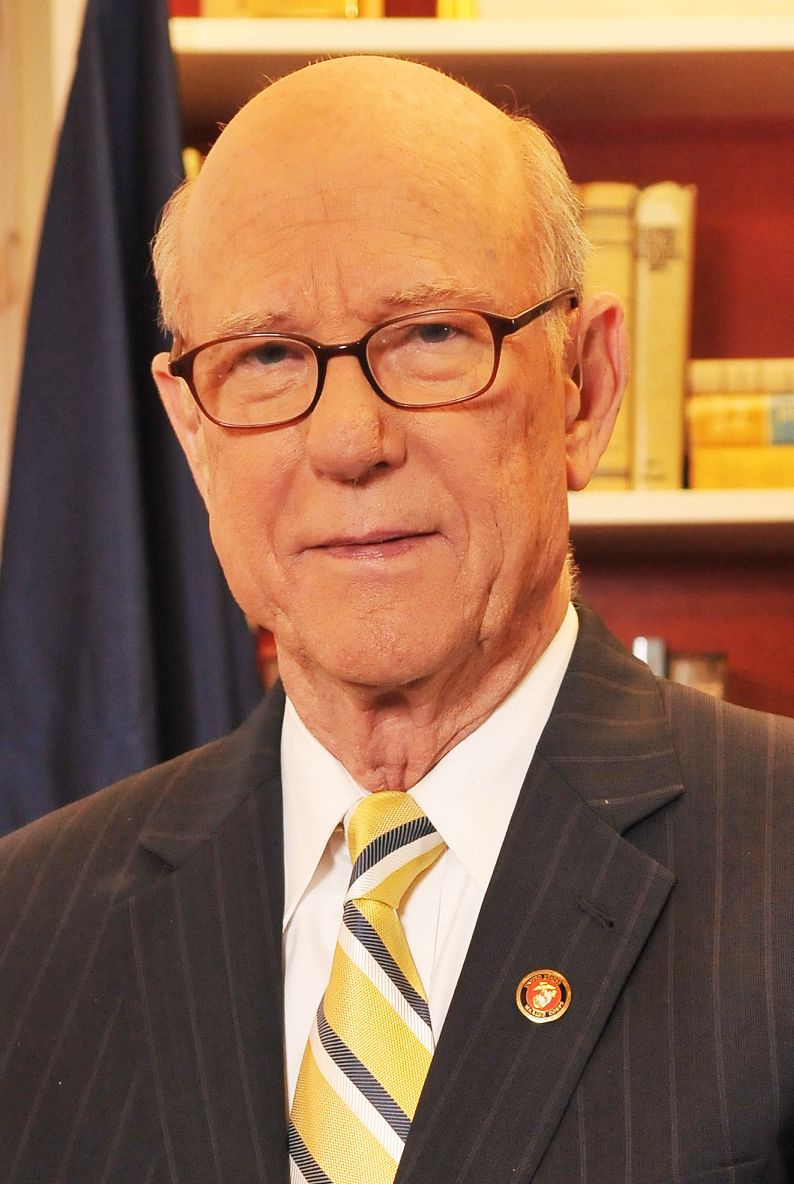

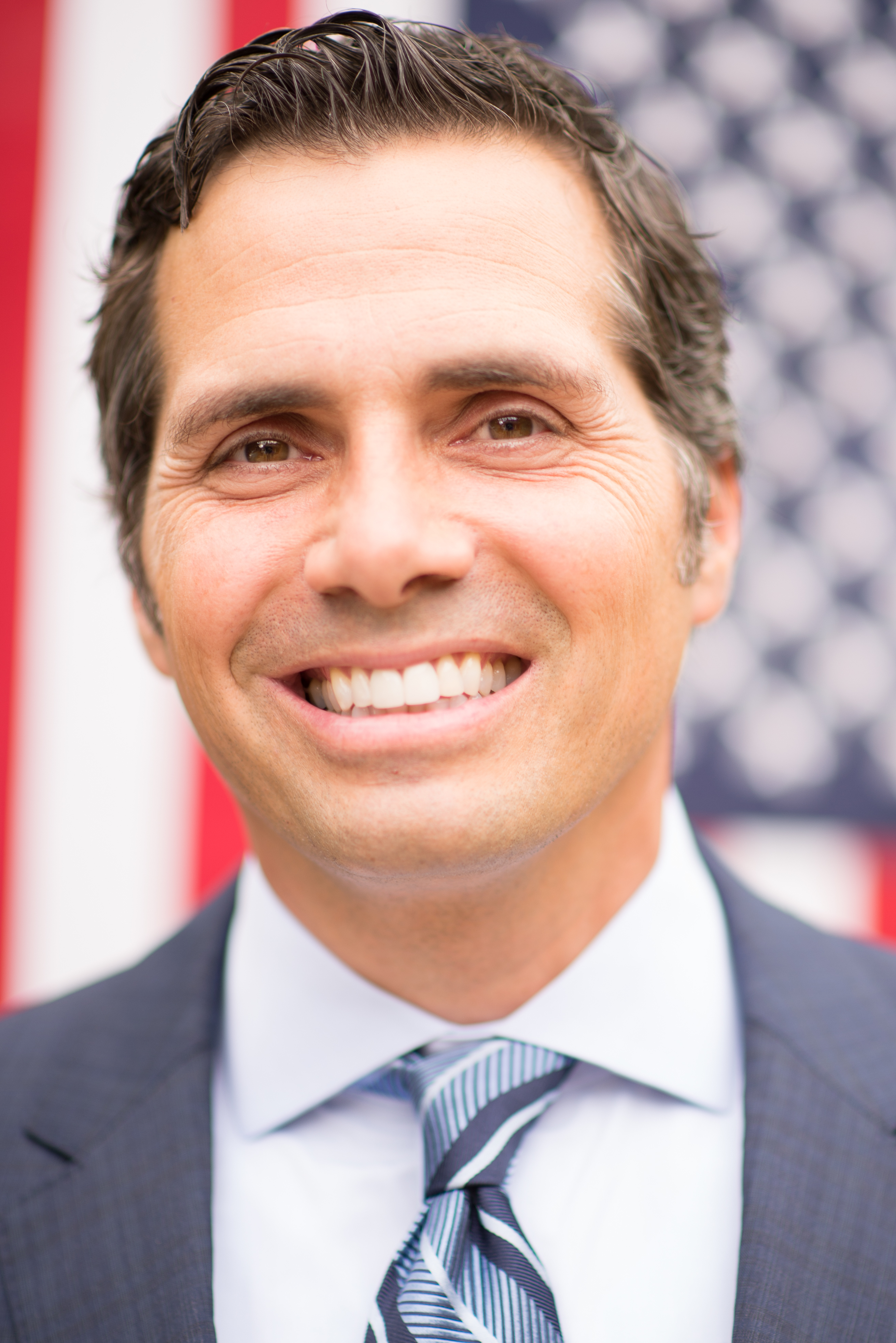
Nominee	Pat Roberts	Greg Orman
Party	Republican	Independent
Popular vote	460,350	368,372
Percentage	53.15%	42.53%
- Roberts: 40–50% 50–60% 60–70% 70–80% 80–90% Orman: 40–50% 50–60% 60–70%
U.S. senator before election
Pat Roberts
Republican
Elected U.S. Senator
Pat Roberts
Republican

The 2014 United States Senate election in Kansas was held on November 4, 2014, to elect a member of the United States Senate to represent the State of Kansas, concurrently with other elections to the United States Senate in other states, elections to the United States House of Representatives, and various state and local elections.

Incumbent Republican Senator Pat Roberts was re-elected to a fourth term against Independent Greg Orman and Libertarian nominee Randall Batson. The Democratic nominee, Chad Taylor, withdrew from the race.

== Republican primary ==
Roberts gained negative press attention after criticism that he did not own a home in Kansas, with some comparing the situation to that of former Indiana Senator Richard Lugar, who lost a 2012 Senate primary after a similar residency controversy. Roberts owns a home in Alexandria, Virginia. The primary was held on August 5, 2014.

Primary opponent Milton R. Wolf, a radiologist, was under investigation by a state medical ethics board for posting X-ray images of dead patients with macabre commentary to Facebook.

=== Candidates ===
==== Declared ====
- Pat Roberts, incumbent senator
- D.J. Smith, former Osawatomie city councilwoman
- Milton R. Wolf, radiologist, conservative commentator and Barack Obama's second cousin
- Alvin Zahnter, truck driver and Vietnam War veteran

==== Declined ====
- Tim Huelskamp, U.S. representative (re-elected to House)
- Kris Kobach, secretary of state of Kansas (re-elected as secretary of state)
- Dennis Pyle, state senator
- Todd Tiahrt, former U.S. representative (ran for KS-04)

=== Endorsements ===
Pat Roberts

Statewide officials

- Jeb Bush, former governor of Florida
- Sarah Palin, former governor of Alaska and 2008 Republican nominee for vice president of the United States
Milton Wolf

U.S. representatives

- Jim Ryun, former U.S. representative

Individuals

- Mark Levin, host of The Mark Levin Show

Organizations

- Republican Liberty Caucus
- Senate Conservatives Fund
- Tea Party Express

=== Polling ===
Poll source	Date(s) administered	Sample size	Margin of error	Pat Roberts	D.J. Smith	Milton Wolf	Alvin Zahnter	Other	Undecided
The Tarrance Group^	January 13–15, 2014	501	± 4.5%	69%	—	15%	—	—	16%
Public Policy Polling	February 18–20, 2014	375	± 5.1%	49%	—	23%	—	—	28%
SurveyUSA	June 19–23, 2014	508	± 4.4%	56%	—	23%	—	8%	12%
GEB International	July 9, 2014	500	± 4.28%	42%	—	30%	—	—	28%
SurveyUSA	July 17–22, 2014	691	± 3.8%	50%	6%	30%	3%	—	12%
Daily Kos/Google Consumer Surveys	August 4, 2014	1,002	± 3.1%	53.4%	—	39.1%	—	—	7.5%

Poll source	Date(s) administered	Sample size	Margin of error	Pat Roberts	Someone more conservative	Undecided
Public Policy Polling	February 18–20, 2014	375	± 5.1%	43%	39%	18%
Public Policy Polling	February 21–24, 2013	760	± 3.6%	42%	34%	24%

- ^ Internal poll for the Pat Roberts campaign
Hypothetical polling

Poll source	Date(s) administered	Sample size	Margin of error	Pat Roberts	Tim Huelskamp	Undecided
Public Policy Polling	February 21–24, 2013	760	± 3.6%	53%	22%	26%

Poll source	Date(s) administered	Sample size	Margin of error	Pat Roberts	Kris Kobach	Undecided
Public Policy Polling	February 21–24, 2013	760	± 3.6%	55%	19%	26%

Poll source	Date(s) administered	Sample size	Margin of error	Pat Roberts	Todd Tiahrt	Undecided
Public Policy Polling	February 21–24, 2013	760	± 3.6%	47%	26%	27%

=== Results ===
Results by county: Roberts: 40–50%; 50–60%; 60–70%; 70–80%; Wolf: 40–50%; 50–60%

Republican primary results
Party	Candidate	Votes	%
Republican	Pat Roberts (incumbent)	127,089	48.08%
Republican	Milton Wolf	107,799	40.78%
Republican	D.J. Smith	15,288	5.78%
Republican	Alvin E. Zahnter	13,935	5.26%
Total votes		264,340	100.00%

== Democratic primary ==
=== Candidates ===
==== Declared ====
- Chad Taylor, Shawnee County district attorney
- Patrick Wiesner, attorney and candidate for the U.S. Senate in 2010

==== Declined ====
- Kathleen Sebelius, former U.S. secretary of health and human services and former governor of Kansas

=== Polling ===
Poll source	Date(s) administered	Sample size	Margin of error	Chad Taylor	Patrick Wiesner	Undecided
KSN News/SurveyUSA	July 17–22, 2014	322	± 5.6%	48%	17%	35%
KSN News/SurveyUSA	June 19–23, 2014	252	± 6.3%	41%	16%	43%

=== Results ===
Results by county: Taylor: 50–60%; 60–70%; 70–80%; 80–90%; Wiesner: 50–60%; 60–70%; Tie: 50–60%

Democratic primary results
Party	Candidate	Votes	%
Democratic	Chad Taylor	35,067	53.3%
Democratic	Patrick Wiesner	30,752	46.7%
Total votes		65,819	100.0%

== Libertarian primary ==
=== Candidates ===
==== Declared ====
- Randall Batson, nominee for the State House in 2012

== Independents ==
=== Candidates ===
==== Declared ====
- Greg Orman, businessman, briefly ran in the Democratic primary in 2008 before dropping out

== General election ==
=== Campaign ===
Republicans were worried about Roberts' campaign in August 2014, perceiving it as lethargic and inactive, that Roberts had a low favorability rating, and that internal polling suggested the race was rather close. At the behest of Senate Minority leader Mitch McConnell as well as former Senator Bob Dole, Roberts fired his longtime campaign manager Leroy Towns in early September 2014. Chris LaCivita was brought in to revamp the race, and LaCivita protege Corry Bliss replaced Towns as campaign manager. Bliss urged Roberts focus on a strategy of tying Orman to President Obama at every turn, as Obama had low favorability ratings in Kansas. Roberts also began spending more time in Kansas, living in a hotel in Topeka rather than his home in Alexandria, Virginia.

On September 3, Democratic nominee Chad Taylor withdrew from the race. On September 4, Kris Kobach, the Republican Kansas Secretary of State, announced that Taylor would remain on the ballot because state law demands he declare himself "incapable of fulfilling the duties of office if elected" in order to be removed, which he did not do. Taylor challenged the decision, and on September 18 the Kansas Supreme Court decided that his name would be taken off the ballot.

On the same day, Kobach demanded the chairman of the Democratic Party name a replacement in eight days, saying he would consider litigation to force the party if they refused.

A registered Democrat with family ties to Republican Governor Sam Brownback's campaign also filed a petition with the Kansas Supreme Court on September 18 to force the Democratic Party to name a new candidate. Kobach ordered ballots to be mailed to overseas voters on September 20 without a Democratic candidate, but included a disclaimer that another ballot will be sent if the Democratic Party names a replacement candidate.

The state district court in Shawnee County threw out the petition, meaning no replacement for Taylor needed to be named.

The efforts by Bliss and other Republican strategists would ultimately prove successful. Roberts' polling improved in October. Roberts defeated Orman in the general election, winning reelection to a fourth term in office.

If Orman had been elected, the U.S. Senate would have had three independent senators for the first time in the chamber's history. This—and the question of whom Orman would choose to caucus with if elected—were large questions in the electoral contest, and because the Kansas race was showing tight in the polls, a subject of considerable national political discourse as well.

=== Fundraising ===
Candidate	Raised	Spent	Cash on hand	Debt
Greg Orman (I)	$2,461,766	$3,298,186	$183,599	$1,124,982
Pat Roberts (R)	$5,383,491	$5,534,415	$927,449	0

=== Debates ===
- Complete video of debate, October 8, 2014
- Complete video of debate, October 15, 2014

=== Endorsements ===
Greg Orman (I)

Individuals

- Tim Owens, Republican former state senator
- Jim Sherow, former mayor of Manhattan and Democratic nominee for KS-01

Organizations

- AFL-CIO
- The Centrist Project
- Human Rights Campaign
- Traditional Republicans for Common Sense
- Women for Kansas
Pat Roberts (R)

Organizations

- National Federation of Independent Business
- NRA Political Victory Fund
- Tea Party Express

=== Predictions ===
Source	Ranking	As of
The Cook Political Report	Tossup	November 3, 2014
Sabato's Crystal Ball	Lean R	November 3, 2014
Rothenberg Political Report	Tossup	November 3, 2014
Real Clear Politics	Tossup	November 3, 2014

=== Polling ===
View source data.

Poll source	Date(s) administered	Sample size	Margin of error	Pat Roberts (R)	Chad Taylor (D)	Greg Orman (I)	Randall Batson (L)	Other	Undecided
Public Policy Polling	February 18–20, 2014	693	± 3.7%	48%	32%	—	—	—	20%
Rasmussen Reports	April 16–17, 2014	750	± 4%	50%	32%	—	—	5%	13%
SurveyUSA	June 19–23, 2014	1068	± 3.1%	43%	33%	7%	5%	—	12%
SurveyUSA	July 17–22, 2014	1,208	± 2.9%	38%	33%	14%	4%	—	10%
CBS News/NYT/YouGov	July 5–24, 2014	1,281	± 6.1%	53%	37%	—	—	7%	4%
Rasmussen Reports	August 6–7, 2014	750	± 4%	44%	40%	—	—	7%	8%
Public Policy Polling	August 14–17, 2014	903	± 3.3%	32%	25%	23%	3%	—	17%
Public Policy Polling	August 14–17, 2014	903	± 3.3%	43%	39%	—	—	—	17%
Public Policy Polling	August 14–17, 2014	903	± 3.3%	33%	—	43%	—	—	24%
KSN News/SurveyUSA	August 20–23, 2014	560	± 4.2%	37%	32%	20%	4%	—	6%
CBS News/NYT/YouGov	August 18 – September 2, 2014	839	± 5%	47%	35%	—	—	2%	15%
KSN News/SurveyUSA	September 4–7, 2014	555	± 4.2%	36%	10%	37%	6%	—	11%
Public Policy Polling	September 11–14, 2014	1,328	± 2.7%	34%	6% (Note: Poll did not tell respondents that Taylor had withdrawn until after they answered.)	41%	4%	—	15%
Public Policy Polling	September 11–14, 2014	1,328	± 2.7%	36%	—	46%	—	—	17%
Fox News	September 14–16, 2014	604	± 4%	40%	11% (Note: Poll did not tell respondents that Taylor had withdrawn.)	38%	4%	—	8%
Fox News	September 14–16, 2014	604	± 4%	42%	—	48%	—	—	8%
Rasmussen Reports	September 16–17, 2014	750	± 4%	40%	3% (Note: Rasmussen does not specify whether respondents were given the option of voting for a withdrawn Taylor, or they specifically named him.)	45%	—	2%	10%
Rasmussen Reports	September 16–17, 2014	750	± 4%	39%	9% (Note: With Taylor still listed on the ballot)	38%	—	2%	12%
Remington Research	September 23, 2014	625	± 3.91%	42%	—	50%	3%	—	5%
Suffolk University	September 27–30, 2014	500	± 4.4%	41.2%	—	46.4%	0.8%	—	11.6%
CBS News/NYT/YouGov	September 20 – October 1, 2014	2,013	± 3%	40%	—	40%	2%	0%	17%
NBC News/Marist	September 27 – October 1, 2014	511 LV	± 4.3%	38%	—	48%	5%	1%	9%
NBC News/Marist	September 27 – October 1, 2014	848 RV	± 3.4%	36%	—	46%	5%	1%	12%
Gravis Marketing	September 30 – October 1, 2014	850	± 3%	40%	—	47%	—	—	13%
SurveyUSA	October 2–5, 2014	549	± 4.3%	42%	—	47%	4%	—	7%
CNN/ORC	October 2–6, 2014	687	± 3.5%	49%	—	48%	—	—	3%
Fox News	October 4–7, 2014	702	± 3.5%	44%	—	39%	3%	4%	12%
Rasmussen Reports	October 7–8, 2014	750	± 4%	40%	—	52%	—	4%	4%
Public Policy Polling	October 9–12, 2014	1,081	± 3%	41%	—	44%	5%	—	10%
Public Policy Polling	October 9–12, 2014	1,081	± 3%	43%	—	46%	—	—	11%
Remington Research	October 9–12, 2014	1,091	± 2.97%	48%	—	46%	2%	—	4%
Monmouth University	October 16–19, 2014	429	± 4.7%	46%	—	46%	—	3%	5%
Rasmussen Reports	October 20–21, 2014	960	± 3%	44%	—	49%	—	3%	5%
Gravis Marketing	October 20–21, 2014	1,124	± 3%	45%	—	47%	—	—	8%
NBC News/Marist	October 18–22, 2014	757 LV	± 3.6%	44%	—	45%	4%	<1%	7%
NBC News/Marist	October 18–22, 2014	1,055 RV	± 3%	42%	—	45%	4%	1%	9%
CBS News/NYT/YouGov	October 16–23, 2014	1,973	± 4%	42%	—	38%	1%	0%	18%
Survey USA	October 22–26, 2014	623	± 4%	42%	—	44%	4%	—	10%
Fox News	October 28–30, 2014	907	± 3%	43%	—	44%	3%	1%	8%
YouGov	October 25–31, 2014	1,137	± 4.8%	38%	—	37%	2%	2%	22%
Public Policy Polling	October 30–31, 2014	752	± ?	47%	—	46%	3%	—	4%
Public Policy Polling	November 1–3, 2014	963	± 3.2%	46%	—	47%	3%	—	4%
Public Policy Polling	November 1–3, 2014	963	± 3.2%	47%	—	49%	—	—	3%

Hypothetical polling

With Huelskamp

Poll source	Date(s) administered	Sample size	Margin of error	Tim Huelskamp (R)	Carl Brewer (D)	Other	Undecided
Public Policy Polling	February 21–24, 2013	1,229	± 2.8%	40%	36%	—	24%

Poll source	Date(s) administered	Sample size	Margin of error	Tim Huelskamp (R)	Mark Parkinson (D)	Other	Undecided
Public Policy Polling	February 21–24, 2013	1,229	± 2.8%	41%	35%	—	24%

Poll source	Date(s) administered	Sample size	Margin of error	Tim Huelskamp (R)	Kathleen Sebelius (D)	Other	Undecided
Public Policy Polling	February 21–24, 2013	1,229	± 2.8%	46%	41%	—	13%

With Roberts

Poll source	Date(s) administered	Sample size	Margin of error	Pat Roberts (R)	Carl Brewer (D)	Other	Undecided
Public Policy Polling	February 21–24, 2013	1,229	± 2.8%	50%	34%	—	16%

Poll source	Date(s) administered	Sample size	Margin of error	Pat Roberts (R)	Mark Parkinson (D)	Other	Undecided
Public Policy Polling	February 21–24, 2013	1,229	± 2.8%	49%	34%	—	17%

Poll source	Date(s) administered	Sample size	Margin of error	Pat Roberts (R)	Kathleen Sebelius (D)	Other	Undecided
Rasmussen Reports	April 16–17, 2014	750	± 4%	54%	37%	5%	4%
Public Policy Polling	February 18–20, 2014	693	± 3.7%	52%	38%	—	10%
Public Policy Polling	February 21–24, 2013	1,229	± 2.8%	51%	40%	—	9%

Poll source	Date(s) administered	Sample size	Margin of error	Pat Roberts (R)	Patrick Wiesner (D)	Randall Batson (L)	Greg Orman (I)	Other	Undecided
SurveyUSA	June 19–23, 2014	1068	± 3.1%	45%	29%	6%	8%	—	12%
SurveyUSA	July 17–22, 2014	1,208	± 2.9%	40%	27%	5%	17%	—	11%

With Wolf

Poll source	Date(s) administered	Sample size	Margin of error	Milton Wolf (R)	Kathleen Sebelius (D)	Other	Undecided
Public Policy Polling	February 18–20, 2014	693	± 3.7%	46%	39%	—	15%

Poll source	Date(s) administered	Sample size	Margin of error	Milton Wolf (R)	Chad Taylor (D)	Randall Batson (L)	Greg Orman (I)	Other	Undecided
Public Policy Polling	February 18–20, 2014	693	± 3.7%	33%	32%	—	—	—	35%
SurveyUSA	June 19–23, 2014	1068	± 3.1%	33%	36%	6%	7%	—	18%
SurveyUSA	July 17–22, 2014	1,208	± 2.9%	33%	34%	5%	14%	—	14%

Poll source	Date(s) administered	Sample size	Margin of error	Milton Wolf (R)	Patrick Wiesner (D)	Randall Batson (L)	Greg Orman (I)	Other	Undecided
SurveyUSA	June 19–23, 2014	1068	± 3.1%	36%	30%	6%	8%	—	20%
SurveyUSA	July 17–22, 2014	1,208	± 2.9%	35%	28%	5%	16%	—	16%

=== Results ===
United States Senate election in Kansas, 2014
Party	Candidate	Votes	%	±%
Republican	Pat Roberts (incumbent)	460,350	53.15%	−6.91%
Independent	Greg Orman	368,372	42.53%	N/A
Libertarian	Randall Batson	37,469	4.32%	+2.20%
Total votes		866,191	100.00%	N/A
Republican hold				

==== By county ====
County	Pat Roberts Republican		Greg Orman Independent		Randall Batson Libertarian		Margin		Total
County	#	%	#	%	#	%	#	%	Total
Allen	2,531	57.2%	1,564	35.3%	333	7.5%	967	21.9%	4,428
Anderson	1,554	61.3%	826	32.6%	157	6.2%	728	28.7%	2,537
Atchison	2,490	52.7%	1,953	41.3%	286	6.0%	537	11.4%	4,729
Barber	1,196	70.1%	447	26.2%	63	3.7%	749	43.9%	1,706
Barton	5,403	67.0%	2,313	28.7%	354	4.4%	3,090	38.7%	8,070
Bourbon	3,190	64.3%	1,456	29.4%	312	6.3%	1,734	34.9%	4,958
Brown	2,074	65.1%	964	30.2%	150	4.7%	1,110	34.9%	3,188
Butler	12,387	59.7%	7,413	35.7%	937	4.5%	4,974	24.0%	20,737
Chase	649	59.9%	377	34.8%	57	5.3%	272	25.1%	1,083
Chautauqua	837	75.6%	221	20.0%	49	4.4%	616	55.6%	1,107
Cherokee	3,675	61.9%	1,800	30.3%	459	7.7%	1,875	31.6%	5,934
Cheyenne	823	78.5%	196	18.7%	30	2.9%	627	59.8%	1,049
Clark	607	74.2%	177	21.6%	34	4.2%	430	52.6%	818
Clay	2,156	68.3%	869	27.5%	131	4.2%	1,287	40.8%	3,156
Cloud	2,123	66.4%	906	28.3%	168	5.3%	1,217	38.1%	3,197
Coffey	2,025	64.4%	951	30.2%	168	5.3%	1,074	34.2%	3,144
Comanche	496	71.3%	163	23.4%	37	5.3%	333	47.9%	696
Cowley	5,292	53.9%	3,947	40.2%	575	5.9%	1,345	13.7%	9,814
Crawford	5,136	49.1%	4,539	43.4%	790	7.5%	597	5.7%	10,465
Decatur	943	77.2%	231	18.9%	48	3.9%	712	58.3%	1,222
Dickinson	4,160	64.5%	1,951	30.2%	340	5.3%	2,209	34.3%	6,451
Doniphan	1,555	69.3%	552	24.6%	136	6.1%	1,003	44.7%	2,243
Douglas	11,116	29.4%	25,315	67.0%	1,327	3.5%	-14,199	-37.6%	37,758
Edwards	806	70.3%	294	25.6%	47	4.1%	512	44.7%	1,147
Elk	680	62.7%	318	29.3%	86	7.9%	362	33.4%	1,084
Ellis	5,730	60.2%	3,368	35.4%	415	4.4%	2,362	24.8%	9,513
Ellsworth	1,410	62.0%	750	33.0%	113	5.0%	660	29.0%	2,273
Finney	4,446	65.6%	2,028	29.9%	302	4.5%	2,418	35.7%	6,776
Ford	4,126	66.8%	1,814	29.4%	239	3.9%	2,312	37.4%	6,179
Franklin	4,374	55.6%	3,024	38.5%	462	5.9%	1,350	17.1%	7,860
Geary	2,779	55.8%	1,974	39.6%	230	4.6%	805	16.2%	4,983
Gove	857	75.8%	228	20.2%	45	4.0%	629	55.6%	1,130
Graham	799	69.9%	298	26.1%	46	4.0%	501	43.8%	1,143
Grant	1,275	72.0%	413	23.3%	84	4.7%	862	48.7%	1,772
Gray	1,210	73.8%	360	22.0%	69	4.2%	850	51.8%	1,639
Greeley	426	75.3%	113	20.0%	27	4.8%	313	55.3%	566
Greenwood	1,432	64.1%	644	28.8%	157	7.0%	788	35.3%	2,233
Hamilton	546	76.2%	150	20.9%	21	2.9%	396	55.3%	717
Harper	1,352	67.2%	538	26.8%	121	6.0%	814	40.4%	2,011
Harvey	6,169	53.0%	5,051	43.4%	424	3.6%	1,118	9.6%	11,644
Haskell	829	78.9%	187	17.8%	35	3.3%	642	61.1%	1,051
Hodgeman	581	75.5%	169	21.9%	20	2.6%	412	53.6%	770
Jackson	2,553	53.2%	2,014	41.9%	234	4.9%	539	11.3%	4,801
Jefferson	3,421	52.1%	2,878	43.8%	267	4.1%	543	8.3%	6,566
Jewell	850	75.9%	216	19.3%	54	4.8%	634	56.2%	1,120
Johnson	94,843	49.2%	92,849	48.2%	4,985	2.6%	1,994	1.0%	192,677
Kearny	763	75.8%	214	21.3%	30	3.0%	549	54.5%	1,007
Kingman	1,858	64.9%	875	30.6%	129	4.5%	983	34.3%	2,862
Kiowa	687	76.5%	185	20.6%	26	2.9%	502	55.9%	898
Labette	3,214	56.7%	2,086	36.8%	372	6.6%	1,128	19.9%	5,672
Lane	580	75.9%	159	20.8%	25	3.3%	421	55.1%	764
Leavenworth	10,411	52.4%	8,561	43.1%	900	4.5%	1,850	9.3%	19,872
Lincoln	925	72.5%	299	23.4%	52	4.1%	626	49.1%	1,276
Linn	2,032	63.6%	973	30.5%	188	5.9%	1,059	33.1%	3,193
Logan	798	76.1%	202	19.3%	49	4.7%	596	56.8%	1,049
Lyon	4,261	47.8%	4,254	47.7%	402	4.5%	7	0.1%	8,917
Marion	2,847	64.3%	1,363	30.8%	219	4.9%	1,484	33.5%	4,429
Marshall	2,250	60.8%	1,295	35.0%	158	4.3%	955	25.8%	3,703
McPherson	6,043	59.6%	3,588	35.4%	507	5.0%	2,455	24.2%	10,138
Meade	1,035	73.9%	314	22.4%	52	3.7%	721	51.5%	1,401
Miami	6,090	57.9%	4,012	38.2%	408	3.9%	2,078	19.7%	10,510
Mitchell	1,635	72.5%	527	23.4%	94	4.2%	1,108	49.1%	2,256
Montgomery	5,997	69.6%	2,213	25.7%	403	4.7%	3,784	43.9%	8,613
Morris	1,196	58.8%	723	35.5%	116	5.7%	473	23.3%	2,035
Morton	699	76.8%	176	19.3%	35	3.8%	523	57.5%	910
Nemaha	2,890	68.6%	1,134	26.9%	188	4.5%	1,756	41.7%	4,212
Neosho	2,905	60.4%	1,565	32.5%	338	7.1%	1,340	27.9%	4,808
Ness	917	77.8%	220	18.7%	41	3.5%	697	59.1%	1,178
Norton	1,339	73.7%	390	21.5%	87	4.8%	949	52.2%	1,816
Osage	3,198	55.2%	2,278	39.3%	315	5.4%	920	15.9%	5,791
Osborne	1,046	72.3%	329	22.7%	72	5.0%	717	49.6%	1,447
Ottawa	1,683	72.5%	503	21.7%	136	5.9%	1,180	50.8%	2,322
Pawnee	1,373	63.5%	697	32.2%	92	4.3%	676	31.3%	2,162
Phillips	1,926	75.6%	504	19.8%	117	4.6%	1,422	55.8%	2,547
Pottawatomie	5,408	66.8%	2,338	28.9%	347	4.3%	3,070	37.9%	8,093
Pratt	1,968	63.0%	1,006	32.2%	152	4.9%	962	28.8%	3,126
Rawlins	944	81.0%	176	15.1%	46	3.9%	768	65.9%	1,166
Reno	10,489	55.6%	7,425	39.3%	956	5.1%	3,064	16.3%	18,870
Republic	1,421	71.0%	483	24.1%	96	4.8%	938	46.9%	2,000
Rice	1,899	63.5%	936	31.3%	154	5.2%	963	32.2%	2,989
Riley	7,779	50.4%	7,182	46.5%	488	3.2%	597	3.9%	15,449
Rooks	1,510	74.5%	396	19.5%	121	6.0%	1,114	55.0%	2,027
Rush	888	67.0%	370	27.9%	67	5.1%	518	39.9%	1,325
Russell	1,739	67.6%	704	27.4%	131	5.1%	1,035	40.2%	2,574
Saline	9,694	55.6%	6,720	38.6%	1,015	5.8%	2,974	17.0%	17,429
Scott	1,363	78.4%	296	17.0%	80	4.6%	1,067	61.4%	1,739
Sedgwick	72,506	50.9%	62,527	43.9%	7,318	5.1%	9,979	7.0%	142,351
Seward	2,399	73.2%	729	22.2%	151	4.6%	1,670	51.0%	3,279
Shawnee	26,566	43.0%	32,770	53.1%	2,392	3.9%	-6,204	-10.1%	61,728
Sheridan	815	77.5%	200	19.0%	36	3.4%	615	58.5%	1,051
Sherman	1,511	75.2%	426	21.2%	71	3.5%	1,085	54.0%	2,008
Smith	1,272	73.7%	365	21.1%	90	5.2%	907	52.6%	1,727
Stafford	1,027	67.6%	421	27.7%	72	4.7%	606	39.9%	1,520
Stanton	560	79.2%	119	16.8%	28	4.0%	441	62.4%	707
Stevens	1,119	78.5%	240	16.8%	66	4.6%	879	61.7%	1,425
Sumner	4,268	57.9%	2,650	35.9%	454	6.2%	1,618	22.0%	7,372
Thomas	1,956	72.3%	636	23.5%	112	4.1%	1,320	48.8%	2,704
Trego	813	68.4%	309	26.0%	67	5.6%	504	42.4%	1,189
Wabaunsee	1,769	61.8%	922	32.2%	173	6.0%	847	29.6%	2,864
Wallace	545	86.5%	68	10.8%	17	2.7%	477	75.7%	630
Washington	1,684	73.4%	496	21.6%	113	4.9%	1,188	51.8%	2,293
Wichita	617	80.9%	115	15.1%	31	4.1%	502	65.8%	763
Wilson	1,799	69.1%	656	25.2%	147	5.6%	1,143	43.9%	2,602
Woodson	676	63.4%	305	28.6%	85	8.0%	371	34.8%	1,066
Wyandotte	8,836	31.3%	17,938	63.6%	1,418	5.0%	-9,102	-32.3%	28,192
Totals	460,350	53.1%	368,372	42.5%	37,469	4.3%	91,978	10.6%	866,191

Counties that flipped from Democratic to Independent

- Douglas (largest city: Lawrence)
- Wyandotte (largest city: Kansas City)

Counties that flipped from Republican to Independent

- Shawnee (largest city: Topeka)

Counties that flipped from Democratic to Republican

- Atchison (largest city: Atchison)

==== By congressional district ====
Roberts won three of four congressional districts, with Orman winning the remaining one, which elected a Republican.

District	Roberts	Orman	Representative
1st	63%	32%	Tim Huelskamp
2nd	49%	46%	Lynn Jenkins
3rd	47%	50%	Kevin Yoder
4th	54%	41%	Mike Pompeo

== See also ==
- 2014 United States Senate elections
- 2014 United States elections
- 2014 United States House of Representatives elections in Kansas
- 2014 Kansas gubernatorial election
- 2014 Kansas elections
