= Public Law 114-216 =

Federal law regulating GMO food labeling

Public Law 114-216 is a federal law of the United States that regulates GMO food labeling. It was enacted on July 29, 2016 when President Obama signed then Senate Bill 764 (S.764) and is codified at 7 U.S.C. ch. 38, subch. V and VI. While the law is officially termed A bill to reauthorize and amend the National Sea Grant College Program Act, and for other purposes, it evolved over time into "the legislative vehicle for a measure concerning bioengineered food disclosure", which opponents have called the "DARK Act", an acronym for "Deny Americans the Right to Know Act".

== Legislative history ==
The bill was crafted by Senator Pat Roberts (R-KS) and Debbie Stabenow (D-MI). The "GMO labeling bill" was introduced on 17 March 2015 by its sponsor, Sen. Roger F. Wicker (R-MS), cosponsored by Sen. Dan Sullivan (R-AK), and passed Senate and House in June 2016. The law overturned relevant state laws such as Vermont's GMO labeling law that had called for strict and transparent GMO food labeling in Vermont after July 1, 2016.

Labeling of GMO food is mandated in at least 64 countries, including most European countries, China, Russia, Japan, Brazil, South Africa, and Australia.

== Contents ==
Senate resolution S.744 as originally introduced on 17 March 2015 contained no language to regulate bioengineered foods. A bill entitled "Safe and Accurate Food Labeling Act of 2015" was received in the Senate on 24 July 2015 and referred to the Committee on Agriculture, Nutrition, and Forestry (ANF), which resulted in the amendments to Public Law 114-216 seen now; this was done on 7 July 2016 to "establish a national bioengineered food disclosure standard", whereby bioengineered food (commonly referred to as genetically modified organism or GMO food) is defined as "food that has been genetically engineered in a way that could not be obtained through conventional breeding or found in nature".

Mitch McConnell introduced on 29 June 2016 the "Roberts GMO bill" named after Pat Roberts who was then Chair of the Committee on ANF, and Public Law 114-216 thereafter suffered through no less than 40 amendments over the course of one week.

Public Law 114-216 charges the U. S. Department of Agriculture (USDA) to establish a national mandatory bioengineered food disclosure standard within two years with certain provisions:

- Food from an animal cannot be declared bioengineered on the basis that animal has been fed bioengineered food.
- The minimum amount of bioengineered food present in food needs to be defined by the USDA to carry the bioengineered label.
- The disclosure of bioengineered food can be a text, a symbol, or a digital or electronic link according to the discretion of the food manufacturer.
- USDA is asked to conduct a study to see whether challenges exist in regard to access to electronic information.
- In certain cases a telephone number or internet site are allowed as a means of disclosure.
- Restaurant food and "very small" food manufacturers are excluded from disclosure requirements.
- States (and its subunits) are prohibited from establishing or continuing to require other GMO labeling practices.
- Food cannot be claimed to have no bioengineered food when there is no disclosure label.
- Certification by USDA's National Organic Program "is sufficient" for a claim that bioengineered food is absent.

The law indicates that a QR code could suffice as a GMO label

== USDA responsible for GMO labeling ==
While the FDA is responsible for protecting and promoting public health through the control and supervision of food safety, the agency holds the position that "the use of genetic engineering in the production of food does not present any safety concerns for such foods as a class", and, as there is "an absence of reliable data indicating safety concerns" with GMO foods as a class, voiced no opposition for USDA having the responsibility of regulating GMO food labeling. The agency commented that the bill has language that may allow GMO material to escape labeling: the bill requires labeling if the food contains "genetic material", but that may exempt secondary products like oil, starches, sweeteners, or proteins derived from GMO substrates. The agency questioned the specificity of the definition of bioengineered food when it would not apply to GMOs that could also be achieved by "conventional breeding". The FDA has also voiced some concerns about food information being presented in electronic codes.

As the details of the law need to be worked out, USDA established a working group by September 2016 "to develop a timeline for rulemaking and to ensure an open and transparent process for effectively establishing this new program, which will increase consumer confidence and understanding of the foods they buy, and avoid uncertainty for food companies and farmers".

== History ==
Public Law 114-216 was passed after previous attempts to introduce a national GMO labeling bill had failed. It was fast-tracked without debate or committee review. The original bill S. 764 - "A bill to reauthorize and amend the National Sea Grant College Program Act, and for other purposes" - had nothing to do with food and stalled after having passed the Senate. Hollowed out of its content it was replaced with a bill to defund Planned Parenthood. This bill was then replaced with a bill creating to outlaw state-level GMO labeling and setting a voluntary GMO labeling bill. When this bill failed, the S. 764 husk was used to rush through the present bill, just in time before the Vermont GMO food labeling requirement would have been activated on July 1.

Previous attempts to enact a national GMO labeling law included H. R. 1599 in 2017 – the Safe and Accurate Food Labeling Act of 2017. It was a proposed legislative amendment to the United States Federal Food, Drug and Cosmetic Act. The act passed the House of Representatives on July 23, 2017 but failed in the Senate. An earlier version of the bill had been originally introduced as H. R. 4432 in 2004. and attempted to regulate food labeling specifically in view of the introduction of GMO food in the United States.

== Proponents' view ==
Katie Hill, White House spokesperson, lauded the bill, "(t)his measure will provide new opportunities for consumers to have access to information about their food". Proponents have argued for a comprehensive labeling law that applies nationwide instead of a "patchwork" approach state-by-state. They also feel that a proposed bill will enhance agricultural biotechnology.

Proponents argue that approved GMO food has undergone extensive testing, is "safe" and that basically labeling is unnecessary. Labeling may discourage consumers to use GMO products when such a choice may be irrational. A lot of consumers express fears that have not been substantiated by science.

The bill is backed by Grocery Manufacturers Association, Monsanto, and other large food and beverage corporations.

== Opponents' view ==
While GMOs are present in 75-80% of food Americans consume and have been termed "substantially equivalent" to the corresponding non-GMO foods by the FDA, consumers believe that they have a right to know what is in their food. Thus, a 2013 poll by The New York Times indicated that ninety-three percent of American consumers would like to know if their food has been genetically modified.

The primary objection to the bill is that manufacturers have the option to use electronic codes in lieu of clear readable labels placed directly on the food package, which they argue hides the information. The bill allows the use codes such as the QR code as a form of labeling, and opponents see this as impractical as well as discriminatory. They argue that, for instance, low-income families may not be able to access the information. Critics also oppose the fact that no fines or penalties are included when companies do not follow the law. Additionally, they are concerned that the bill's stipulation that labeling will be required when foods contain genetic material from genetic modification may exempt many of the highly processed foods and ingredients that are usually derived from genetically-modified crops (such as many seed oils, high-fructose corn syrup, and some refined starches and sweeteners), because such foods are often sufficiently refined that no genetic material remains in them. Senator Stabenow dismissed this interpretation when it was advanced by the FDA.

Because clear and accessible labeling is not mandated, some opponents have called this bill and its predecessors the "DARK act" as in "Deny Americans the Right to Know" or "Keep Americans in the DARK".
