= Thomas J. Falk =

American businessman (born 1958)

- Born: 1958 (age 67–68); Waterloo, Iowa, U.S.
- Education: University of Wisconsin–Madison (B.Acy); Stanford University (MS)
- Occupation: Businessman
- Spouse: Karen Kalk
- Children: 1

Thomas J. Falk (born 1958) is an American businessman. He was Chief Executive Officer of consumer product products giant Kimberly-Clark Corporation from 2002 until 2018 and remained as Executive Chairman until his retirement at the end of 2019.

== Early life and education ==
Falk was born in 1958, in Waterloo, Iowa, the oldest of nine children in a modest family. He grew up in the Milwaukee area. His first job was as a caddie at a local golf course Chenequa Country Club, at the age of 12. By age 16, he professionally played drums.

Falk won the Evans Scholarship (a full-tuition award available only to caddies) and received his bachelor's degree in accounting from the University of Wisconsin in 1980. Falk earned a Master's of Science in management at Stanford University Graduate School of Business in 1989.

== Career ==
=== Alexander Grant & Co ===
Falk's first job was with accounting firm Alexander Grant & Co, where he got his public accountant certification. He worked there for 3 years, from 1980 till 1983.

=== Kimberly-Clark Corporation ===
Falk began his career at Kimberly-Clark in 1983. He was appointed as a senior auditor in 1984 and two years later he became a senior financial analyst, in 1986.

In 1989, Falk worked as an operations manager for infant care at South Carolina diaper plant.

In 1991, Falk took the position of the senior vice-president of analysis and administration.

Falk has been an executive director of Kimberly-Clark Corporation since 1999. He served as the President and Chief Operating Officer of Kimberly-Clark Corporation from 1999 to 2002 and as chief executive officer from September 12, 2002, until December 31, 2018. He became Chairman of Kimberly-Clark Corporation's Board of Directors on February 18, 2003, a position he retained for a year following his December 2018 retirement as CEO.

Falk served as Group President - Global Tissue, Pulp and Paper in 1998. He served as the President and Chief Operating Officer since 1999, and as president and chief executive officer in 2002.

== Other activity ==
Falk currently serves on the board of directors of Catalyst, the University of Wisconsin Foundation and Centex Corporation. He is also a governor of the Boys & Girls Clubs of America.

== Personal life ==
Falk is married to Karen Kalk, a native of Hartland. Together they have a son Michael. Tom's brother, Bob Falk, is CEO of Purdue Federal Credit Union in West Lafayette, Indiana.
