= Chad Taylor (politician) =

American politician and attorney

District Attorney of Shawnee County, Kansas
- In office 2009 – January 9, 2017
- Preceded by: Robert Hecht
- Succeeded by: Mike Kagay

Personal details
- Born: November 4, 1973 (age 52) Silver Lake, Kansas, U.S.
- Party: Democratic
- Education: University of Kansas (BA); Illinois Institute of Technology (JD)
- Website: Government website

Chad Taylor (born November 4, 1973) is an American politician and attorney, who served as the district attorney of Shawnee County, Kansas from 2009 to 2017. He was nominated to run for United States Senate in the 2014 election for the Democratic Party, but withdrew from the race on September 3, 2014.

Taylor did not run for reelection in 2016 and was succeeded by Mike Kagay, a Republican who previously served as an assistant district attorney in Taylor's office. His term ended on January 9, 2017.

== Early life and education ==
Taylor grew up on a family farm in Silver Lake, Kansas. He earned a bachelor's degree in accounting from the University of Kansas and a JD from Chicago-Kent College of Law.

== Career ==
Prior to being elected District Attorney, Taylor worked in the Public Power Industry and in private practice. He has also served as a Municipal Court Judge Pro Tem, an administrative hearing officer, a member of the Shawnee County Civil Service Board, and a member of the Shawnee County Planning Commission. Taylor was elected the District Attorney of Shawnee County in 2008. He was re-elected in 2012, after facing no opposition.

In 2009, Taylor launched a Cold Case Homicide Unit to pursue unsolved homicides in Shawnee County. In 2013 the County granted funding to the unit, which has since prosecuted an average of three cases a year. These cases date as far back as 30 years. By January 2010, Taylor's office reported having reduced an over-4000 file backlog, left by predecessor Robert Hecht, to 22 cases. By September of that year, Taylor reported the office being "current."

In 2011, Taylor's office gained national notoriety after Taylor said that budget cuts would stop his office from prosecuting misdemeanor domestic abuse cases. Taylor wanted the city of Topeka to prosecute the cases, but Topeka repealed its ordinance outlawing domestic abuse, forcing Taylor to prosecute the cases. Taylor ultimately had to lay off 17 percent of his work force.

In 2012, Taylor criticized members of the Kansas Legislature for meeting privately with Governor Sam Brownback, despite the state's open meeting rules.

In February 2014, Taylor announced his candidacy for U.S. Senate. Republican Pat Roberts held the seat at the time. On September 3, 2014, Taylor dropped out of the race. Taylor gave no reason for his withdrawal.

The next day, Kansas Secretary of State Kris Kobach declared Taylor's letter to withdraw from the race to be insufficient. Taylor sued Kobach in the Kansas Supreme Court to have his name taken off the ballot. On September 18, however, the Supreme Court issued a ruling in Taylor's favor, and Taylor's name was not included on the ballot.

Party political offices
Preceded by Jim Slattery	Democratic nominee for U.S. Senator from Kansas (Class 2); Withdrew; 2014	Succeeded by Barbara Bollier
