= Kansas's congressional delegations =

Since Kansas became a U.S. state in 1861, it has sent congressional delegations to the United States Senate and United States House of Representatives. Each state elects two senators to serve for six years, and members of the House to two-year terms. Before becoming a state, the Kansas Territory elected a non-voting delegate at-large to Congress from 1854 to 1861.

These are tables of congressional delegations from Kansas to the United States Senate and the United States House of Representatives.

== Current delegation ==
Current U.S. senators from Kansas
| Kansas CPVI (2025): R+8 | Class II senator | Class III senator |
|---|---|---|
| Kansas CPVI (2025): R+8 | Roger Marshall (Junior senator) (Great Bend) | Jerry Moran (Senior senator) (Manhattan) |
| Party | Republican | Republican |
| Incumbent since | January 3, 2021 | January 3, 2011 |

Kansas's current congressional delegation in the 119th Congress consists of its two senators, both of whom are Republicans, and its four representatives: three Republicans and one Democrat.

The current dean of the Kansas delegation is Senator Jerry Moran, having served in the Senate since 2011 and in Congress since 1997.

U.S. representatives from Kansas
| District | Member (Residence) | Party | Incumbent since | CPVI (2025) | District map |
|---|---|---|---|---|---|
| 1st | Tracey Mann (Salina) | Republican | January 3, 2021 | R+16 | |
| 2nd | Derek Schmidt (Independence) | Republican | January 3, 2025 | R+10 | |
| 3rd | Sharice Davids (Roeland Park) | Democratic | January 3, 2019 | D+2 | |
| 4th | Ron Estes (Wichita) | Republican | April 25, 2017 | R+12 | |

== United States Senate ==
| Class II senator | Congress | Class III senator |
|---|---|---|
| Jim Lane (R) | 37th (1861–1863) | Samuel C. Pomeroy (R) |
| Jim Lane (R) | 38th (1863–1865) | Samuel C. Pomeroy (R) |
| Jim Lane (R) | 39th (1865–1867) | Samuel C. Pomeroy (R) |
| Edmund G. Ross (R) | 39th (1865–1867) | Samuel C. Pomeroy (R) |
| Edmund G. Ross (R) | 40th (1867–1869) | Samuel C. Pomeroy (R) |
| Edmund G. Ross (R) | 41st (1869–1871) | Samuel C. Pomeroy (R) |
| Alexander Caldwell (R) | 42nd (1871–1873) | Samuel C. Pomeroy (R) |
| Alexander Caldwell (R) | 43rd (1873–1875) | John J. Ingalls (R) |
| Robert Crozier (R) | 43rd (1873–1875) | John J. Ingalls (R) |
| James M. Harvey (R) | 43rd (1873–1875) | John J. Ingalls (R) |
| James M. Harvey (R) | 44th (1875–1877) | John J. Ingalls (R) |
| Preston B. Plumb (R) | 45th (1877–1879) | John J. Ingalls (R) |
| Preston B. Plumb (R) | 46th (1879–1881) | John J. Ingalls (R) |
| Preston B. Plumb (R) | 47th (1881–1883) | John J. Ingalls (R) |
| Preston B. Plumb (R) | 48th (1883–1885) | John J. Ingalls (R) |
| Preston B. Plumb (R) | 49th (1885–1887) | John J. Ingalls (R) |
| Preston B. Plumb (R) | 50th (1887–1889) | John J. Ingalls (R) |
| Preston B. Plumb (R) | 51st (1889–1891) | John J. Ingalls (R) |
| Preston B. Plumb (R) | 52nd (1891–1893) | William A. Peffer (Pop) |
| Bishop W. Perkins (R) | 52nd (1891–1893) | William A. Peffer (Pop) |
| John Martin (D) | 53rd (1893–1895) | William A. Peffer (Pop) |
| Lucien Baker (R) | 54th (1895–1897) | William A. Peffer (Pop) |
| Lucien Baker (R) | 55th (1897–1899) | William A. Harris (Pop) |
| Lucien Baker (R) | 56th (1899–1901) | William A. Harris (Pop) |
| Joseph R. Burton (R) | 57th (1901–1903) | William A. Harris (Pop) |
| Joseph R. Burton (R) | 58th (1903–1905) | Chester I. Long (R) |
| Joseph R. Burton (R) | 59th (1905–1907) | Chester I. Long (R) |
| Alfred W. Benson (R) | 59th (1905–1907) | Chester I. Long (R) |
| Charles Curtis (R) | 60th (1907–1909) | Chester I. Long (R) |
| Charles Curtis (R) | 61st (1909–1911) | Joseph L. Bristow (R) |
| Charles Curtis (R) | 62nd (1911–1913) | Joseph L. Bristow (R) |
| William H. Thompson (D) | 63rd (1913–1915) | Joseph L. Bristow (R) |
| William H. Thompson (D) | 64th (1915–1917) | Charles Curtis (R) |
| William H. Thompson (D) | 65th (1917–1919) | Charles Curtis (R) |
| Arthur Capper (R) | 66th (1919–1921) | Charles Curtis (R) |
| Arthur Capper (R) | 67th (1921–1923) | Charles Curtis (R) |
| Arthur Capper (R) | 68th (1923–1925) | Charles Curtis (R) |
| Arthur Capper (R) | 69th (1925–1927) | Charles Curtis (R) |
| Arthur Capper (R) | 70th (1927–1929) | Charles Curtis (R) |
| Arthur Capper (R) | 71st (1929–1931) | Henry J. Allen (R) |
| Arthur Capper (R) | 71st (1929–1931) | George McGill (D) |
| Arthur Capper (R) | 72nd (1931–1933) | George McGill (D) |
| Arthur Capper (R) | 73rd (1933–1935) | George McGill (D) |
| Arthur Capper (R) | 74th (1935–1937) | George McGill (D) |
| Arthur Capper (R) | 75th (1937–1939) | George McGill (D) |
| Arthur Capper (R) | 76th (1939–1941) | Clyde M. Reed (R) |
| Arthur Capper (R) | 77th (1941–1943) | Clyde M. Reed (R) |
| Arthur Capper (R) | 78th (1943–1945) | Clyde M. Reed (R) |
| Arthur Capper (R) | 79th (1945–1947) | Clyde M. Reed (R) |
| Arthur Capper (R) | 80th (1947–1949) | Clyde M. Reed (R) |
| Andrew Frank; Schoeppel (R) | 81st (1949–1951) | Clyde M. Reed (R) |
| Andrew Frank; Schoeppel (R) | 81st (1949–1951) | Harry Darby (R) |
| Andrew Frank; Schoeppel (R) | 81st (1949–1951) | Frank Carlson (R) |
| Andrew Frank; Schoeppel (R) | 82nd (1951–1953) | Frank Carlson (R) |
| Andrew Frank; Schoeppel (R) | 83rd (1953–1955) | Frank Carlson (R) |
| Andrew Frank; Schoeppel (R) | 84th (1955–1957) | Frank Carlson (R) |
| Andrew Frank; Schoeppel (R) | 85th (1957–1959) | Frank Carlson (R) |
| Andrew Frank; Schoeppel (R) | 86th (1959–1961) | Frank Carlson (R) |
| Andrew Frank; Schoeppel (R) | 87th (1961–1963) | Frank Carlson (R) |
| James B. Pearson (R) | 87th (1961–1963) | Frank Carlson (R) |
| James B. Pearson (R) | 88th (1963–1965) | Frank Carlson (R) |
| James B. Pearson (R) | 89th (1965–1967) | Frank Carlson (R) |
| James B. Pearson (R) | 90th (1967–1969) | Frank Carlson (R) |
| James B. Pearson (R) | 91st (1969–1971) | Bob Dole (R) |
| James B. Pearson (R) | 92nd (1971–1973) | Bob Dole (R) |
| James B. Pearson (R) | 93rd (1973–1975) | Bob Dole (R) |
| James B. Pearson (R) | 94th (1975–1977) | Bob Dole (R) |
| James B. Pearson (R) | 95th (1977–1979) | Bob Dole (R) |
| Nancy Kassebaum (R) | 95th (1977–1979) | Bob Dole (R) |
| Nancy Kassebaum (R) | 96th (1979–1981) | Bob Dole (R) |
| Nancy Kassebaum (R) | 97th (1981–1983) | Bob Dole (R) |
| Nancy Kassebaum (R) | 98th (1983–1985) | Bob Dole (R) |
| Nancy Kassebaum (R) | 99th (1985–1987) | Bob Dole (R) |
| Nancy Kassebaum (R) | 100th (1987–1989) | Bob Dole (R) |
| Nancy Kassebaum (R) | 101st (1989–1991) | Bob Dole (R) |
| Nancy Kassebaum (R) | 102nd (1991–1993) | Bob Dole (R) |
| Nancy Kassebaum (R) | 103rd (1993–1995) | Bob Dole (R) |
| Nancy Kassebaum (R) | 104th (1995–1997) | Bob Dole (R) |
| Nancy Kassebaum (R) | 104th (1995–1997) | Sheila Frahm (R) |
| Nancy Kassebaum (R) | 104th (1995–1997) | Sam Brownback (R) |
| Pat Roberts (R) | 105th (1997–1999) | Sam Brownback (R) |
| Pat Roberts (R) | 106th (1999–2001) | Sam Brownback (R) |
| Pat Roberts (R) | 107th (2001–2003) | Sam Brownback (R) |
| Pat Roberts (R) | 108th (2003–2005) | Sam Brownback (R) |
| Pat Roberts (R) | 109th (2005–2007) | Sam Brownback (R) |
| Pat Roberts (R) | 110th (2007–2009) | Sam Brownback (R) |
| Pat Roberts (R) | 111th (2009–2011) | Sam Brownback (R) |
| Pat Roberts (R) | 112th (2011–2013) | Jerry Moran (R) |
| Pat Roberts (R) | 113th (2013–2015) | Jerry Moran (R) |
| Pat Roberts (R) | 114th (2015–2017) | Jerry Moran (R) |
| Pat Roberts (R) | 115th (2017–2019) | Jerry Moran (R) |
| Pat Roberts (R) | 116th (2019–2021) | Jerry Moran (R) |
| Roger Marshall (R) | 117th (2021–2023) | Jerry Moran (R) |
| Roger Marshall (R) | 118th (2023–2025) | Jerry Moran (R) |
| Roger Marshall (R) | 119th (2025–2027) | Jerry Moran (R) |
| Adam Hamilton (D) | 120th (2027–2029) | Jerry Moran (R) |

== United States House of Representatives ==
=== 1854–1861: 1 non-voting delegate ===
Starting on December 20, 1854, Kansas Territory sent a non-voting delegate to the House.

| Congress | Delegate from territorial district |
|---|---|
| 33rd (1853–1854) | John Wilkins Whitfield (D) |
| 34th (1855–1856) | John Wilkins Whitfield (D) |
| 35th (1857–1858) | Marcus J. Parrott (R) |
| 36th (1859–1860) | Marcus J. Parrott (R) |

=== 1859–1873: 1 at-large seat ===
Following statehood on January 29, 1861, Kansas had one seat in the House.

| Congress | At-large district |
|---|---|
| 36th (1859–1861) | Martin F. Conway (R) |
| 37th (1861–1863) | Martin F. Conway (R) |
| 38th (1863–1865) | A. Carter Wilder (R) |
| 39th (1865–1867) | Sidney Clarke (R) |
| 40th (1867–1869) | Sidney Clarke (R) |
| 41st (1869–1871) | Sidney Clarke (R) |
| 42nd (1871–1873) | David P. Lowe (R) |

=== 1873–1883: 3 seats ===
Following the 1870 census, Kansas was apportioned 3 seats, all of which were elected at-large statewide until 1875, when it redistricted into 3 districts.

| Congress | At-large district | | |
| Congress | Seat A | Seat B | Seat C |
|---|---|---|---|
| 43rd (1873–1875) | David P. Lowe (R) | Stephen A. Cobb (R) | William A. Phillips (R) |
| Congress | 1st district | 2nd district | 3rd district |
| 44th (1875–1877) | William A. Phillips (R) | John R. Goodin (D) | William Ripley Brown (R) |
| 45th (1877–1879) | William A. Phillips (R) | Dudley C. Haskell (R) | Thomas Ryan (R) |
| 46th (1879–1881) | John A. Anderson (R) | Dudley C. Haskell (R) | Thomas Ryan (R) |
| 47th (1881–1883) | John A. Anderson (R) | Dudley C. Haskell (R) | Thomas Ryan (R) |

=== 1883–1893: 7 seats ===
Following the 1880 census, Kansas was apportioned 7 seats. Until 1885, 3 seats were elected from single member districts and 4 were elected at-large statewide on a general ticket. In 1885, all 7 seats were redistricted.

| Congress | District | | | Elected on a general ticket from Kansas's at-large district | | | |
| Congress | 1st | 2nd | 3rd | Seat A | Seat B | Seat C | Seat D |
|---|---|---|---|---|---|---|---|
| 48th (1883–1885) | John A. Anderson (R) | Dudley C. Haskell (R) | Thomas Ryan (R) | Lewis Hanback (R) | Edmund N. Morrill (R) | Bishop W. Perkins (R) | Samuel R. Peters (R) |
| Congress | District | | | | | | |
| Congress | 1st | 2nd | 3rd | 4th | 5th | 6th | 7th |
| 49th (1885–1887) | Edmund N. Morrill (R) | Edward H. Funston (R) | Bishop W. Perkins (R) | Thomas Ryan (R) | John A. Anderson (R) | Lewis Hanback (R) | Samuel R. Peters (R) |
| 50th (1887–1889) | Edmund N. Morrill (R) | Edward H. Funston (R) | Bishop W. Perkins (R) | Thomas Ryan (R) | John A. Anderson (IR) | Erastus J. Turner (R) | Samuel R. Peters (R) |
| 51st (1889–1891) | Edmund N. Morrill (R) | Edward H. Funston (R) | Bishop W. Perkins (R) | Thomas Ryan (R) | John A. Anderson (R) | Erastus J. Turner (R) | Samuel R. Peters (R) |
| 51st (1889–1891) | Edmund N. Morrill (R) | Edward H. Funston (R) | Bishop W. Perkins (R) | Harrison Kelley (R) | John A. Anderson (R) | Erastus J. Turner (R) | Samuel R. Peters (R) |
| 52nd (1891–1893) | Case Broderick (R) | Edward H. Funston (R) | Benjamin H. Clover (Pop) | John G. Otis (Pop) | John Davis (Pop) | William Baker (Pop) | Jerry Simpson (Pop) |

=== 1893–1933: 8 seats ===
Following the 1890 census, Kansas was apportioned 8 seats. Until 1907, 7 seats were elected from single-member districts and 1 was elected at-large statewide. In 1907, all 8 seats were redistricted.

| Congress | District | | | | | | | At-large |
| Congress | 1st | 2nd | 3rd | 4th | 5th | 6th | 7th | At-large |
|---|---|---|---|---|---|---|---|---|
| 53rd (1893–1895) | Case Broderick (R) | Horace Ladd Moore (D) | Thomas J. Hudson (Pop) | Charles Curtis (R) | John Davis (Pop) | William Baker (Pop) | Jerry Simpson (Pop) | William A. Harris (Pop) |
| 54th (1895–1897) | Case Broderick (R) | Orrin L. Miller (R) | Snyder S. Kirkpatrick (R) | Charles Curtis (R) | William A. Calderhead (R) | William Baker (Pop) | Chester I. Long (R) | Richard W. Blue (R) |
| 55th (1897–1899) | Case Broderick (R) | Mason S. Peters (Pop) | Edwin R. Ridgely (Pop) | Charles Curtis (R) | William D. Vincent (Pop) | Nelson B. McCormick (Pop) | Jerry Simpson (Pop) | Jeremiah D. Botkin (Pop) |
| 56th (1899–1901) | Charles Curtis (R) | Justin De Witt; Bowersock (R) | Edwin R. Ridgely (Pop) | James Monroe; Miller (R) | William A. Calderhead (R) | William Augustus; Reeder (R) | Chester I. Long (R) | Willis J. Bailey (R) |
| 57th (1901–1903) | Charles Curtis (R) | Justin De Witt; Bowersock (R) | Alfred Metcalf; Jackson (D) | James Monroe; Miller (R) | William A. Calderhead (R) | William Augustus; Reeder (R) | Chester I. Long (R) | Charles Frederick; Scott (R) |
| 58th (1903–1905) | Charles Curtis (R) | Justin De Witt; Bowersock (R) | Philip P. Campbell (R) | James Monroe; Miller (R) | William A. Calderhead (R) | William Augustus; Reeder (R) | Victor Murdock (R) | Charles Frederick; Scott (R) |
| 59th (1905–1907) | Charles Curtis (R) | Justin De Witt; Bowersock (R) | Philip P. Campbell (R) | James Monroe; Miller (R) | William A. Calderhead (R) | William Augustus; Reeder (R) | Victor Murdock (R) | Charles Frederick; Scott (R) |
| Congress | District | | | | | | | |
| Congress | 1st | 2nd | 3rd | 4th | 5th | 6th | 7th | 8th |
| 60th (1907–1909) | Daniel R. Anthony Jr. (R) | Charles Frederick; Scott (R) | Philip P. Campbell (R) | James Monroe; Miller (R) | William A. Calderhead (R) | William Augustus; Reeder (R) | Edmond H. Madison (R) | Victor Murdock (R) |
| 61st (1909–1911) | Daniel R. Anthony Jr. (R) | Charles Frederick; Scott (R) | Philip P. Campbell (R) | James Monroe; Miller (R) | William A. Calderhead (R) | William Augustus; Reeder (R) | Edmond H. Madison (R) | Victor Murdock (R) |
| 62nd (1911–1913) | Daniel R. Anthony Jr. (R) | Alexander Mitchell (R) | Philip P. Campbell (R) | Fred S. Jackson (R) | Rollin R. Rees (R) | Isaac D. Young (R) | Edmond H. Madison (R) | Victor Murdock (R) |
| 62nd (1911–1913) | Daniel R. Anthony Jr. (R) | Joseph Taggart (D) | Philip P. Campbell (R) | Fred S. Jackson (R) | Rollin R. Rees (R) | Isaac D. Young (R) | Edmond H. Madison (R) | Victor Murdock (R) |
| 63rd (1913–1915) | Daniel R. Anthony Jr. (R) | Joseph Taggart (D) | Philip P. Campbell (R) | Dudley Doolittle (D) | Guy T. Helvering (D) | John R. Connelly (D) | George A. Neeley (D) | Victor Murdock (R) |
| 64th (1915–1917) | Daniel R. Anthony Jr. (R) | Joseph Taggart (D) | Philip P. Campbell (R) | Dudley Doolittle (D) | Guy T. Helvering (D) | John R. Connelly (D) | Jouett Shouse (D) | William Augustus; Ayres (D) |
| 65th (1917–1919) | Daniel R. Anthony Jr. (R) | Edward C. Little (R) | Philip P. Campbell (R) | Dudley Doolittle (D) | Guy T. Helvering (D) | John R. Connelly (D) | Jouett Shouse (D) | William Augustus; Ayres (D) |
| 66th (1919–1921) | Daniel R. Anthony Jr. (R) | Edward C. Little (R) | Philip P. Campbell (R) | Homer Hoch (R) | James G. Strong (R) | Hays B. White (R) | Jasper N. Tincher (R) | William Augustus; Ayres (D) |
| 67th (1921–1923) | Daniel R. Anthony Jr. (R) | Edward C. Little (R) | Philip P. Campbell (R) | Homer Hoch (R) | James G. Strong (R) | Hays B. White (R) | Jasper N. Tincher (R) | Richard Ely Bird (R) |
| 68th (1923–1925) | Daniel R. Anthony Jr. (R) | Edward C. Little (R) | William H. Sproul (R) | Homer Hoch (R) | James G. Strong (R) | Hays B. White (R) | Jasper N. Tincher (R) | William Augustus; Ayres (D) |
| 69th (1925–1927) | Daniel R. Anthony Jr. (R) | Chauncey B. Little (D) | William H. Sproul (R) | Homer Hoch (R) | James G. Strong (R) | Hays B. White (R) | Jasper N. Tincher (R) | William Augustus; Ayres (D) |
| 70th (1927–1929) | Daniel R. Anthony Jr. (R) | U. S. Guyer (R) | William H. Sproul (R) | Homer Hoch (R) | James G. Strong (R) | Hays B. White (R) | Clifford R. Hope (R) | William Augustus; Ayres (D) |
| 71st (1929–1931) | William P. Lambertson (R) | U. S. Guyer (R) | William H. Sproul (R) | Homer Hoch (R) | James G. Strong (R) | Charles I. Sparks (R) | Clifford R. Hope (R) | William Augustus; Ayres (D) |
| 72nd (1931–1933) | William P. Lambertson (R) | U. S. Guyer (R) | Harold C. McGugin (R) | Homer Hoch (R) | James G. Strong (R) | Charles I. Sparks (R) | Clifford R. Hope (R) | William Augustus; Ayres (D) |

=== 1933–1943: 7 seats ===
Following the 1930 census, Kansas was apportioned 7 seats, all of which were elected from single-member districts.

| Congress | District | | | | | | |
| Congress | 1st | 2nd | 3rd | 4th | 5th | 6th | 7th |
|---|---|---|---|---|---|---|---|
| 73rd (1933–1935) | William P. Lambertson (R) | U. S. Guyer (R) | Harold C. McGugin (R) | Randolph; Carpenter (D) | William A. Ayers (D) | Kathryn O'Loughlin; McCarthy (D) | Clifford R. Hope (R) |
| 74th (1935–1937) | William P. Lambertson (R) | U. S. Guyer (R) | Edward White; Patterson (D) | Randolph; Carpenter (D) | John M. Houston (D) | Frank Carlson (R) | Clifford R. Hope (R) |
| 75th (1937–1939) | William P. Lambertson (R) | U. S. Guyer (R) | Edward White; Patterson (D) | Edward H. Rees (R) | John M. Houston (D) | Frank Carlson (R) | Clifford R. Hope (R) |
| 76th (1939–1941) | William P. Lambertson (R) | U. S. Guyer (R) | Thomas D. Winter (R) | Edward H. Rees (R) | John M. Houston (D) | Frank Carlson (R) | Clifford R. Hope (R) |
| 77th (1941–1943) | William P. Lambertson (R) | U. S. Guyer (R) | Thomas D. Winter (R) | Edward H. Rees (R) | John M. Houston (D) | Frank Carlson (R) | Clifford R. Hope (R) |

=== 1943–1963: 6 seats ===
Following the 1940 census, Kansas was apportioned 6 seats, all of which were elected from single-member districts.

| Congress | 1st district | 2nd district | 3rd district | 4th district | 5th district | 6th district |
|---|---|---|---|---|---|---|
| 78th (1943–1945) | William P. Lambertson (R) | Errett P. Scrivner (R) | Thomas D. Winter (R) | Edward H. Rees (R) | Clifford R. Hope (R) | Frank Carlson (R) |
| 79th (1945–1947) | Albert M. Cole (R) | Errett P. Scrivner (R) | Thomas D. Winter (R) | Edward H. Rees (R) | Clifford R. Hope (R) | Frank Carlson (R) |
| 80th (1947–1949) | Albert M. Cole (R) | Errett P. Scrivner (R) | Herbert A. Meyer (R) | Edward H. Rees (R) | Clifford R. Hope (R) | Wint Smith (R) |
| 81st (1949–1951) | Albert M. Cole (R) | Errett P. Scrivner (R) | Herbert A. Meyer (R) | Edward H. Rees (R) | Clifford R. Hope (R) | Wint Smith (R) |
| 82nd (1951–1953) | Albert M. Cole (R) | Errett P. Scrivner (R) | Myron V. George (R) | Edward H. Rees (R) | Clifford R. Hope (R) | Wint Smith (R) |
| 83rd (1953–1955) | Howard Miller (D) | Errett P. Scrivner (R) | Myron V. George (R) | Edward H. Rees (R) | Clifford R. Hope (R) | Wint Smith (R) |
| 84th (1955–1957) | William H. Avery (R) | Errett P. Scrivner (R) | Myron V. George (R) | Edward H. Rees (R) | Clifford R. Hope (R) | Wint Smith (R) |
| 85th (1957–1959) | William H. Avery (R) | Errett P. Scrivner (R) | Myron V. George (R) | Edward H. Rees (R) | J. Floyd; Breeding (D) | Wint Smith (R) |
| 86th (1959–1961) | William H. Avery (R) | Newell A. George (D) | Denver D. Hargis (D) | Edward H. Rees (R) | J. Floyd; Breeding (D) | Wint Smith (R) |
| 87th (1961–1963) | William H. Avery (R) | Robert Ellsworth (R) | Walter McVey Jr. (R) | Garner E. Shriver (R) | J. Floyd; Breeding (D) | Bob Dole (R) |

=== 1963–1993: 5 seats ===
Following the 1960 census, Kansas was apportioned 5 seats, all of which were elected from single-member districts.

| Congress | 1st district | 2nd district | 3rd district | 4th district | 5th district |
|---|---|---|---|---|---|
| 88th (1963–1965) | Bob Dole (R) | William H. Avery (R) | Robert Ellsworth (R) | Garner E. Shriver (R) | Joe Skubitz (R) |
| 89th (1965–1967) | Bob Dole (R) | Chester L. Mize (R) | Robert Ellsworth (R) | Garner E. Shriver (R) | Joe Skubitz (R) |
| 90th (1967–1969) | Bob Dole (R) | Chester L. Mize (R) | Larry Winn (R) | Garner E. Shriver (R) | Joe Skubitz (R) |
| 91st (1969–1971) | Keith Sebelius (R) | Chester L. Mize (R) | Larry Winn (R) | Garner E. Shriver (R) | Joe Skubitz (R) |
| 92nd (1971–1973) | Keith Sebelius (R) | William R. Roy (D) | Larry Winn (R) | Garner E. Shriver (R) | Joe Skubitz (R) |
| 93rd (1973–1975) | Keith Sebelius (R) | William R. Roy (D) | Larry Winn (R) | Garner E. Shriver (R) | Joe Skubitz (R) |
| 94th (1975–1977) | Keith Sebelius (R) | Martha Keys (D) | Larry Winn (R) | Garner E. Shriver (R) | Joe Skubitz (R) |
| 95th (1977–1979) | Keith Sebelius (R) | Martha Keys (D) | Larry Winn (R) | Dan Glickman (D) | Joe Skubitz (R) |
| 96th (1979–1981) | Keith Sebelius (R) | Jim Jeffries (R) | Larry Winn (R) | Dan Glickman (D) | Bob Whittaker (R) |
| 97th (1981–1983) | Pat Roberts (R) | Jim Jeffries (R) | Larry Winn (R) | Dan Glickman (D) | Bob Whittaker (R) |
| 98th (1983–1985) | Pat Roberts (R) | Jim Slattery (D) | Larry Winn (R) | Dan Glickman (D) | Bob Whittaker (R) |
| 99th (1985–1987) | Pat Roberts (R) | Jim Slattery (D) | Jan Meyers (R) | Dan Glickman (D) | Bob Whittaker (R) |
| 100th (1987–1989) | Pat Roberts (R) | Jim Slattery (D) | Jan Meyers (R) | Dan Glickman (D) | Bob Whittaker (R) |
| 101st (1989–1991) | Pat Roberts (R) | Jim Slattery (D) | Jan Meyers (R) | Dan Glickman (D) | Bob Whittaker (R) |
| 102nd (1991–1993) | Pat Roberts (R) | Jim Slattery (D) | Jan Meyers (R) | Dan Glickman (D) | Dick Nichols (R) |

=== 1993–present: 4 seats ===
Following the 1990 census, Kansas was apportioned 4 seats, all of which were elected from single member districts.

| Congress | 1st district | 2nd district | 3rd district | 4th district |
|---|---|---|---|---|
| 103rd (1993–1995) | Pat Roberts (R) | Jim Slattery (D) | Jan Meyers (R) | Dan Glickman (D) |
| 104th (1995–1997) | Pat Roberts (R) | Sam Brownback (R) | Jan Meyers (R) | Todd Tiahrt (R) |
| 104th (1995–1997) | Pat Roberts (R) | Jim Ryun (R) | Jan Meyers (R) | Todd Tiahrt (R) |
| 105th (1997–1999) | Jerry Moran (R) | Jim Ryun (R) | Vince Snowbarger (R) | Todd Tiahrt (R) |
| 106th (1999–2001) | Jerry Moran (R) | Jim Ryun (R) | Dennis Moore (D) | Todd Tiahrt (R) |
| 107th (2001–2003) | Jerry Moran (R) | Jim Ryun (R) | Dennis Moore (D) | Todd Tiahrt (R) |
| 108th (2003–2005) | Jerry Moran (R) | Jim Ryun (R) | Dennis Moore (D) | Todd Tiahrt (R) |
| 109th (2005–2007) | Jerry Moran (R) | Jim Ryun (R) | Dennis Moore (D) | Todd Tiahrt (R) |
| 110th (2007–2009) | Jerry Moran (R) | Nancy Boyda (D) | Dennis Moore (D) | Todd Tiahrt (R) |
| 111th (2009–2011) | Jerry Moran (R) | Lynn Jenkins (R) | Dennis Moore (D) | Todd Tiahrt (R) |
| 112th (2011–2013) | Tim Huelskamp (R) | Lynn Jenkins (R) | Kevin Yoder (R) | Mike Pompeo (R) |
| 113th (2013–2015) | Tim Huelskamp (R) | Lynn Jenkins (R) | Kevin Yoder (R) | Mike Pompeo (R) |
| 114th (2015–2017) | Tim Huelskamp (R) | Lynn Jenkins (R) | Kevin Yoder (R) | Mike Pompeo (R) |
| 115th (2017–2019) | Roger Marshall (R) | Lynn Jenkins (R) | Kevin Yoder (R) | Mike Pompeo (R) |
| 115th (2017–2019) | Roger Marshall (R) | Lynn Jenkins (R) | Kevin Yoder (R) | Ron Estes (R) |
| 116th (2019–2021) | Roger Marshall (R) | Steve Watkins (R) | Sharice Davids (D) | Ron Estes (R) |
| 117th (2021–2023) | Tracey Mann (R) | Jake LaTurner (R) | Sharice Davids (D) | Ron Estes (R) |
| 118th (2023–2025) | Tracey Mann (R) | Jake LaTurner (R) | Sharice Davids (D) | Ron Estes (R) |
| 119th (2025–2027) | Tracey Mann (R) | Derek Schmidt (R) | Sharice Davids (D) | Ron Estes (R) |
| 120th (2027–2029) | Tracey Mann (R) | Derek Schmidt (R) | Sharice Davids (D) | Ron Estes (R) |

== Key ==
Democratic (D)
Independent Republican (IR)
Populist (Pop)
Republican (R)

== See also ==
- List of United States congressional districts
- Kansas's congressional districts
- Political party strength in Kansas
