= List of United States representatives from Kansas =

Current delegation

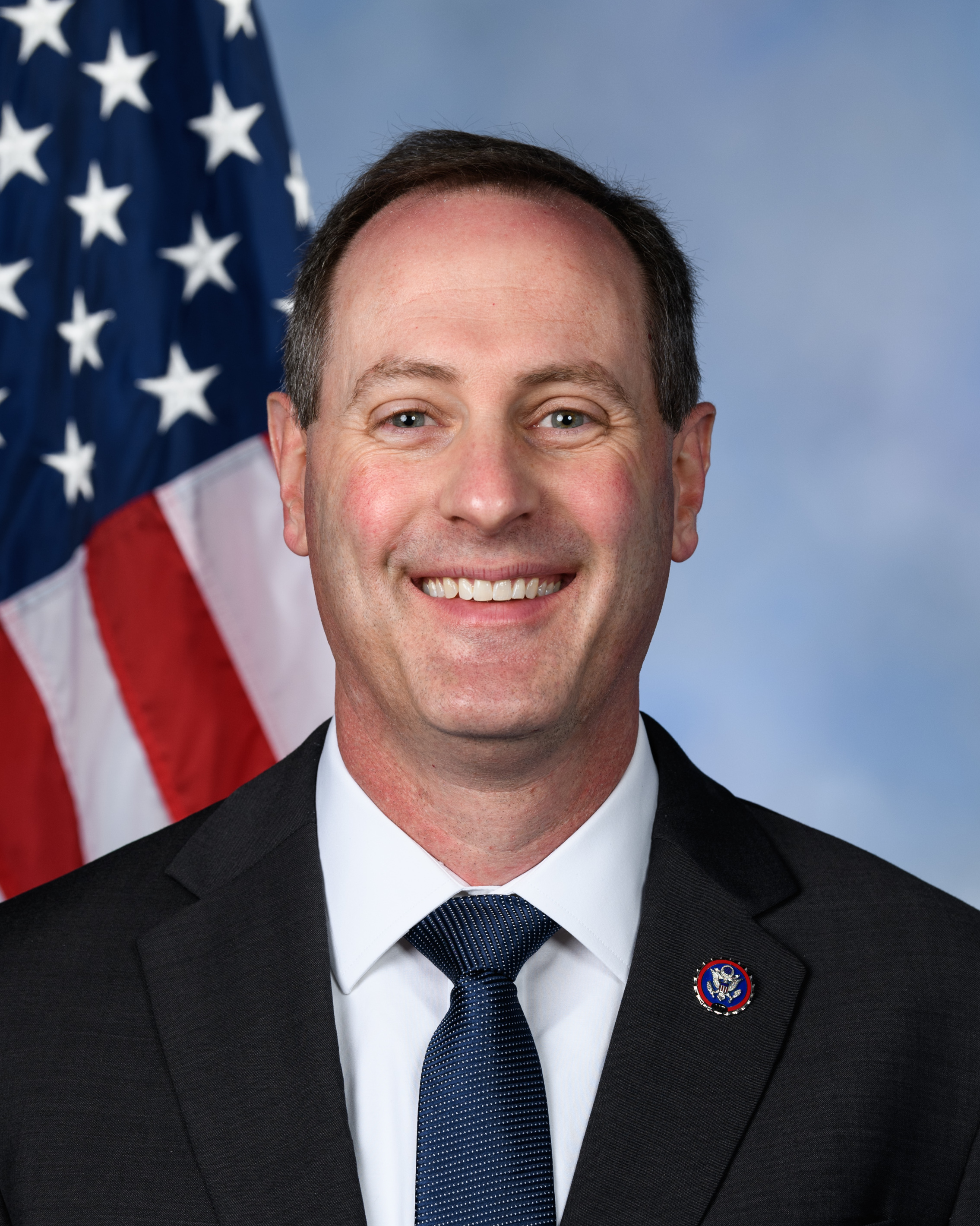
Rep. Tracey Mann (R, 1st district)

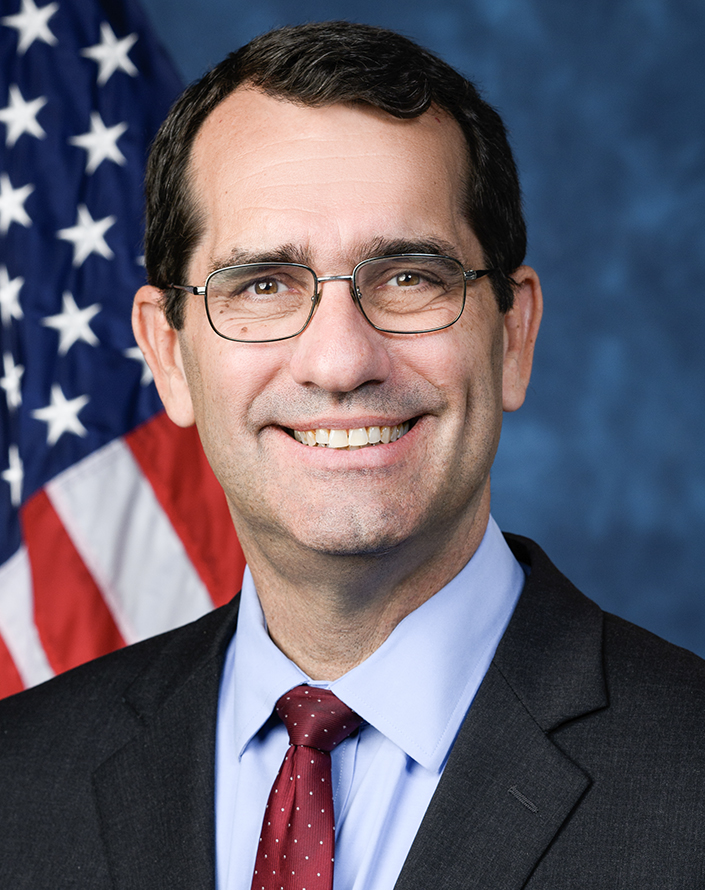
Rep. Derek Schmidt (R, 2nd district)

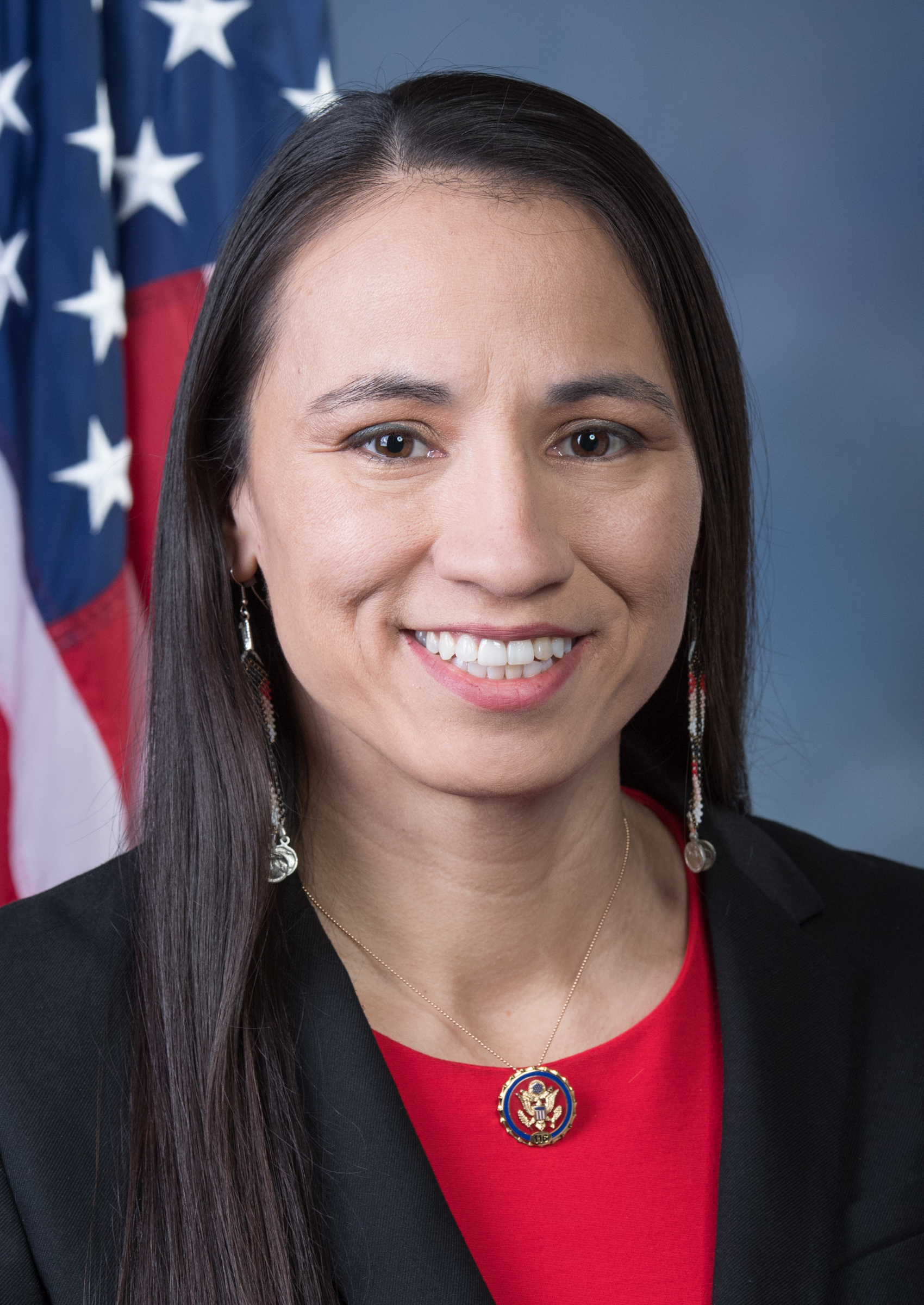
Rep. Sharice Davids (D, 3rd district)

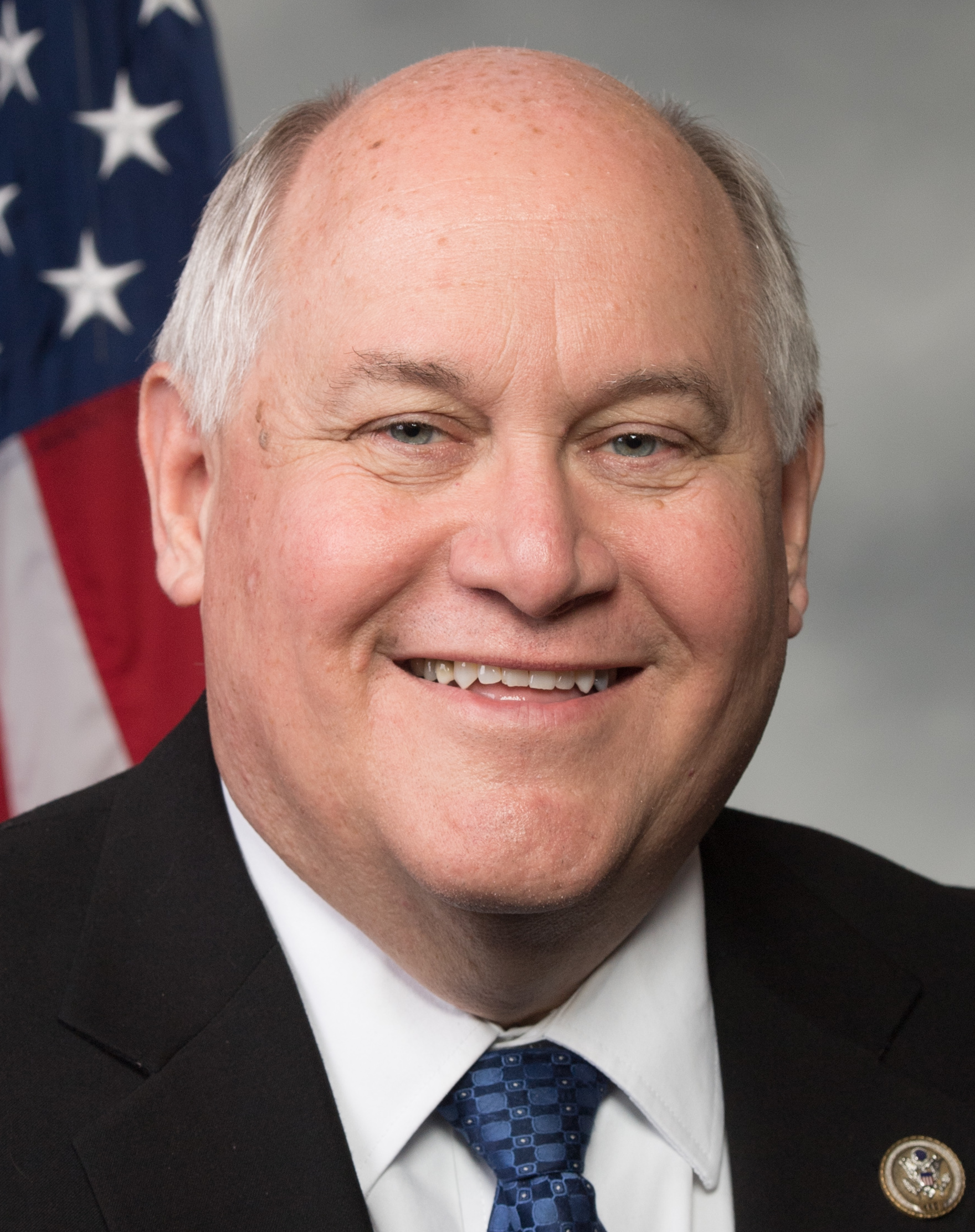
Rep. Ron Estes (R, 4th district)

Current U.S. representatives from Kansas

The following is an alphabetical list of United States representatives from the state of Kansas. For chronological tables of members of both houses of the United States Congress from the state (through the present day), see Kansas's congressional delegations. The list of names should be complete (as of January 3, 2021), but other data may be incomplete. It includes members who have represented both the state and the territory, both past and present.

== Current members ==
Updated January 3, 2025.

- 1st district: Tracey Mann (R) (since 2021)
- 2nd district: Derek Schmidt (R) (since 2025)
- 3rd district: Sharice Davids (D) (since 2019)
- 4th district: Ron Estes (R) (since 2017)

== List of members and delegates ==
Member / Delegate	Party	Years	District	Notes
John Alexander Anderson	Republican	March 4, 1879 – March 3, 1885	1st	Elected in 1878. Re-elected in 1880. Re-elected in 1882. Redistricted to the 5th district.
John Alexander Anderson	Republican	March 4, 1885 – March 3, 1887	5th	Redistricted from the 1st and re-elected in 1884.
John Alexander Anderson	Independent Republican	March 4, 1887 – March 3, 1889	5th	Re-elected in 1886 as an Independent Republican.
John Alexander Anderson	Republican	March 4, 1889 – March 3, 1891	5th	Re-elected in 1888 as a Republican. Retired.
Daniel Read Anthony, Jr.	Republican	May 23, 1907 – March 3, 1929	1st	Elected to finish Curtis's term. Re-elected in 1908. Re-elected in 1910. Re-elected in 1912. Re-elected in 1914. Re-elected in 1916. Re-elected in 1918. Re-elected in 1920. Re-elected in 1922. Re-elected in 1924. Re-elected in 1926. Retired.
William H. Avery	Republican	January 3, 1955 – January 3, 1963	1st	Elected in 1954. Re-elected in 1956. Re-elected in 1958. Re-elected in 1960. Redistricted to the 2nd district.
William H. Avery	Republican	January 3, 1963 – January 3, 1965	2nd	Redistricted from the 1st district and re-elected in 1962. Retired to run for Governor of Kansas.
William Augustus Ayres	Democratic	March 4, 1915 – March 3, 1921	8th	Elected in 1914. Re-elected in 1916. Re-elected in 1918. Lost re-election to Bird.
William Augustus Ayres	Democratic	March 4, 1923 – March 3, 1933	8th	Elected in 1922. Re-elected in 1924. Re-elected in 1926; Re-elected in 1928. Re-elected in 1930. Redistricted to the 5th district.
William Augustus Ayres	Democratic	March 4, 1933 – August 22, 1934	5th	Redistricted from the 8th district and Re-elected in 1932. Resigned when appointed to the Federal Trade Commission.
Willis Joshua Bailey	Republican	March 4, 1899 – March 3, 1901	At-large	Elected in 1898. Retired.
William Baker	Populist	March 4, 1891 – March 3, 1897	6th	Elected in 1890. Re-elected in 1892. Re-elected in 1894. Retired.
Richard Ely Bird	Republican	March 4, 1921 – March 3, 1923	8th	Elected in 1920. Lost re-election to Ayres.
Richard W. Blue	Republican	March 4, 1895 – March 3, 1897	At-large	Elected in 1894. Lost re-election to Botkin.
Jeremiah D. Botkin	Populist	March 4, 1897 – March 3, 1899	At-large	Elected in 1896. Lost re-election to Bailey.
Justin De Witt Bowersock	Republican	March 4, 1899 – March 3, 1907	2nd	Elected in 1898. Re-elected in 1900. Re-elected in 1902. Re-elected in 1904. Retired.
Nancy Boyda	Democratic	January 3, 2007 – January 3, 2009	2nd	Elected in 2006. Lost re-election to Jenkins.
James Floyd Breeding	Democratic	January 3, 1957 – January 3, 1963	5th	Elected in 1956. Re-elected in 1958. Elected in 1960. Lost re-election to Skubitz.
Case Broderick	Republican	March 4, 1891 – March 3, 1899	1st	Elected in 1890. Re-elected in 1892. Re-elected in 1894. Re-elected in 1896. Lost renomination to Curtis.
William R. Brown	Republican	March 4, 1875 – March 3, 1877	3rd	Elected in 1874. Lost renomination to Ryan.
Sam Brownback	Republican	January 3, 1995 – November 7, 1996	2nd	Elected in 1994. Resigned November 27, 1996, retroactive to November 7, 1996, when elected U.S. senator.
William A. Calderhead	Republican	March 4, 1895 – March 3, 1897	5th	Elected in 1894. Lost re-election to Vincent.
William A. Calderhead	Republican	March 4, 1899 – March 3, 1911	5th	Elected in 1898. Re-elected in 1900. Re-elected in 1902. Re-elected in 1904. Re-elected in 1906. Re-elected in 1908. Lost renomination R. Rees.
Philip P. Campbell	Republican	March 4, 1903 – March 3, 1923	3rd	Elected in 1902. Re-elected in 1904. Re-elected in 1906. Re-elected in 1908. Re-elected in 1910. Re-elected in 1912. Re-elected in 1914. Re-elected in 1916. Re-elected in 1918. Re-elected in 1920. Lost renomination to Sproul.
Frank Carlson	Republican	January 3, 1935 – January 3, 1947	6th	Elected in 1934. Re-elected in 1936. Re-elected in 1938. Re-elected in 1940. Re-elected in 1942. Re-elected in 1944. Retired to run for Governor of Kansas.
Randolph Carpenter	Democratic	March 4, 1933 – January 3, 1937	4th	Elected in 1932. Re-elected in 1934. Retired.
Sidney Clarke	Republican	March 4, 1865 – March 3, 1871	At-large	Elected in 1864. Re-elected in 1866. Re-elected in 1868. Lost re-election to Lowe.
Benjamin H. Clover	Populist	March 4, 1891 – March 3, 1893	3rd	Elected in 1890. Retired.
Stephen A. Cobb	Republican	March 4, 1873 – March 3, 1875	At-large	Elected in 1872. Redistricted to the 1st district and lost re-election to Phillips.
Albert M. Cole	Republican	January 3, 1945 – January 3, 1953	1st	Elected in 1944. Re-elected in 1946. Re-elected in 1948. Re-elected in 1950. Lost re-election to H. Miller.
John R. Connelly	Democratic	March 4, 1913 – March 3, 1919	6th	Elected in 1912. Re-elected in 1914. Re-elected in 1916. Lost re-election to White.
Martin F. Conway	Republican	January 29, 1861 – March 3, 1863	At-large	Elected in 1859, in advance of statehood. Continued in office without re-election in 1861. Retired.
Charles Curtis	Republican	March 4, 1893 – March 3, 1899	4th	Elected in 1892. Re-elected in 1894. Re-elected in 1896. Redistricted to the 1st district.
Charles Curtis	Republican	March 4, 1899 – January 28, 1907	1st	Redistricted from the 4th district and re-elected in 1898. Re-elected in 1900. Re-elected in 1902. Re-elected in 1904. Re-elected in 1906 but resigned when elected U.S. senator.
Sharice Davids	Democratic	January 3, 2019 – present	3rd	Elected in 2018. Re-elected in 2020. Re-elected in 2022. Re-elected in 2024.
John Davis	Populist	March 4, 1891 – March 3, 1895	5th	Elected in 1890. Re-elected in 1892. Lost re-election to Calderhead.
Bob Dole	Republican	January 3, 1961 – January 3, 1963	6th	Elected in 1960. Redistricted to the 1st district.
Bob Dole	Republican	January 3, 1963 – January 3, 1969	1st	Redistricted from the 6th district and re-elected in 1962. Re-elected in 1964. Re-elected in 1966. Retired to run for U.S. senator.
Dudley Doolittle	Democratic	March 4, 1913 – March 3, 1919	4th	Elected in 1912. Re-elected in 1914. Re-elected in 1916. Lost re-election to Hoch.
Robert Fred Ellsworth	Republican	January 3, 1961 – January 3, 1963	2nd	Elected in 1960. Redistricted to the 3rd district.
Robert Fred Ellsworth	Republican	January 3, 1963 – January 3, 1967	3rd	Redistricted from the 2nd district and re-elected in 1962. Re-elected in 1964. Retired to run for U.S. senator.
Ron Estes	Republican	April 11, 2017 – present	4th	Elected to finish Pompeo's term. Re-elected in 2018. Re-elected in 2020. Re-elected in 2022. Re-elected in 2024.
Edward H. Funston	Republican	March 21, 1884 – August 2, 1894	2nd	Elected to finish Haskell's term. Re-elected in 1884. Re-elected in 1886. Re-elected in 1888. Re-elected in 1890. Re-elected in 1892. Lost contested election to H. Moore.
Myron V. George	Republican	November 7, 1950 – January 3, 1959	3rd	Elected in 1950 and seated early. Re-elected in 1952. Re-elected in 1954. Re-elected in 1956. Lost re-election to Hargis.
Newell A. George	Democratic	January 3, 1959 – January 3, 1961	2nd	Elected in 1958. Lost re-election to Ellsworth.
Dan Glickman	Democratic	January 3, 1977 – January 3, 1995	4th	Elected in 1976. Re-elected in 1978. Re-elected in 1980. Re-elected in 1982. Re-elected in 1984. Re-elected in 1986. Re-elected in 1988. Re-elected in 1990. Re-elected in 1992. Lost re-election to Tiahrt.
John R. Goodin	Democratic	March 4, 1875 – March 3, 1877	2nd	Elected in 1874. Lost re-election to Haskell.
U. S. Guyer	Republican	November 4, 1924 – March 3, 1925	2nd	Elected to finish Little's term. Lost re-election to C.B. Little.
U. S. Guyer	Republican	March 4, 1927 – June 5, 1943	2nd	Elected in 1926. Re-elected in 1928. Re-elected in 1930. Re-elected in 1932. Re-elected in 1934. Re-elected in 1936. Re-elected in 1938. Re-elected in 1940. Re-elected in 1942. Died.
Lewis Hanback	Republican	March 4, 1883 – March 3, 1885	At-large	Elected in 1882. Redistricted to the 6th district.
Lewis Hanback	Republican	March 4, 1885 – March 3, 1887	6th	Redistricted from the at-large district and re-elected in 1884. Lost renomination to Turner.
Denver David Hargis	Democratic	January 3, 1959 – January 3, 1961	3rd	Elected in 1958. Lost re-election to McVey Jr.
William A. Harris	Populist	March 4, 1893 – March 3, 1895	At-large	Elected in 1892. Lost re-election to Blue.
Dudley C. Haskell	Republican	March 4, 1877 – December 16, 1883	2nd	Elected in 1876. Re-elected in 1878. Re-elected in 1880. Re-elected in 1882. Died.
Guy T. Helvering	Democratic	March 4, 1913 – March 3, 1919	5th	Elected in 1912. Re-elected in 1914. Re-elected in 1916. Lost re-election to Strong.
Homer Hoch	Republican	March 4, 1919 – March 3, 1933	4th	Elected in 1918. Re-elected in 1920. Re-elected in 1922. Re-elected in 1924. Re-elected in 1926. Re-elected in 1928. Re-elected in 1930. Lost re-election to Carpenter.
Clifford R. Hope	Republican	March 4, 1927 – January 3, 1943	7th	Elected in 1926; Re-elected in 1928. Re-elected in 1930. Re-elected in 1932. Re-elected in 1934. Re-elected in 1936. Re-elected in 1938. Re-elected in 1940. Redistricted to the 5th district.
Clifford R. Hope	Republican	January 3, 1943 – January 3, 1957	7th district	Redistricted from the 7th district and re-elected in 1942. Re-elected in 1944. Re-elected in 1946. Re-elected in 1948. Re-elected in 1950. Re-elected in 1952. Re-elected in 1954. Retired.
John Mills Houston	Democratic	January 3, 1935 – January 3, 1943	5th	Elected in 1934. Re-elected in 1936. Re-elected in 1938. Re-elected in 1940. Redistricted to 4th and lost re-election to Rees.
Thomas Jefferson Hudson	Populist	March 4, 1893 – March 3, 1895	3rd	Elected in 1892. Retired.
Tim Huelskamp	Republican	January 3, 2011 – January 3, 2017	1st	Elected in 2010. Re-elected in 2012. Re-elected in 2014. Lost renomination to Marshall.
Alfred Metcalf Jackson	Democratic	March 4, 1901 – March 3, 1903	3rd	Elected in 1900. Lost re-election to Campbell.
Fred S. Jackson	Republican	March 4, 1911 – March 3, 1913	4th	Elected in 1910. Lost re-election to Doolittle.
James Edmund Jeffries	Republican	January 3, 1979 – January 3, 1983	2nd	Elected in 1978. Re-elected in 1980. Retired.
Lynn Jenkins	Republican	January 3, 2009 – January 3, 2019	2nd	Elected in 2008. Re-elected in 2010. Re-elected in 2012. Re-elected in 2014. Re-elected in 2016. Retired.
Harrison Kelley	Republican	December 2, 1889 – March 3, 1891	4th	Elected to finish Ryan's term. Retired.
Martha Keys	Democratic	January 3, 1975 – January 3, 1979	2nd	Elected in 1974. Re-elected in 1976. Lost re-election to Jeffries.
Snyder S. Kirkpatrick	Republican	March 4, 1895 – March 3, 1897	3rd	Re-elected in 1894. Lost re-election to Ridgely.
William P. Lambertson	Republican	March 4, 1929 – January 3, 1945	1st	Elected in 1928. Re-elected in 1930. Re-elected in 1932. Re-elected in 1934. Re-elected in 1936. Re-elected in 1938. Re-elected in 1940. Re-elected in 1942. Lost renomination to Cole.
Jake LaTurner	Republican	January 3, 2021 – January 3, 2025	2nd	Elected in 2020. Re-elected in 2022. Retired.
Chauncey B. Little	Democratic	March 4, 1925 – March 3, 1927	2nd	Elected in 1924. Lost re-election to Guyer.
Edward C. Little	Republican	March 4, 1917 – June 27, 1924	2nd	Elected in 1916. Re-elected in 1918. Re-elected in 1920. Re-elected in 1922. Died.
Chester I. Long	Republican	March 4, 1895 – March 3, 1897	7th	Elected in 1894. Lost re-election to Simpson.
Chester I. Long	Republican	March 4, 1899 – March 3, 1903	7th	Elected in 1898. Re-elected in 1900. Re-elected in 1902 but resigned when elected to the US Senate.
David Perley Lowe	Republican	March 4, 1871 – March 3, 1875	At-large	Elected in 1870. Re-elected in 1872. Retired.
Edmond H. Madison	Republican	March 4, 1907 – September 18, 1911	7th	Elected in 1906. Re-elected in 1908. Re-elected in 1910. Died.
Tracey Mann	Republican	January 3, 2021 – present	1st	Elected in 2020. Re-elected in 2022. Re-elected in 2024.
Roger Marshall	Republican	January 3, 2017 – January 3, 2021	1st	Elected in 2016. Re-elected in 2018. Retired to run for U.S. senator.
Kathryn O'Loughlin McCarthy	Democratic	March 4, 1933 – January 3, 1935	6th	Elected in 1932. Lost re-election to Carlson.
Nelson B. McCormick	Populist	March 4, 1897 – March 3, 1899	6th	Elected in 1896. Lost re-election to Reeder.
Harold C. McGugin	Republican	March 4, 1931 – January 3, 1935	3rd	Elected in 1930. Re-elected in 1932. Lost re-election to Patterson.
Walter Lewis McVey, Jr.	Republican	January 3, 1961 – January 3, 1963	3rd	Elected in 1960. Lost renomination to Ellsworth.
Herbert Alton Meyer	Republican	January 3, 1947 – October 2, 1950	3rd	Elected in 1946. Re-elected in 1948. Died.
Jan Meyers	Republican	January 3, 1985 – January 3, 1997	3rd	Elected in 1984. Re-elected in 1986. Re-elected in 1988. Re-elected in 1990. Re-elected in 1992. Re-elected in 1994. Retired.
Howard Shultz Miller	Democratic	January 3, 1953 – January 3, 1955	1st	Elected in 1952. Lost re-election to Avery.
James Monroe Miller	Republican	March 4, 1899 – March 3, 1911	4th	Elected in 1898. Re-elected in 1900. Re-elected in 1902. Re-elected in 1904. Re-elected in 1906. Re-elected in 1908. Lost renomination to Jackson.
Orrin L. Miller	Republican	March 4, 1895 – March 3, 1897	2nd	Elected in 1894. Retired.
Alexander C. Mitchell	Republican	March 4, 1911 – July 7, 1911	2nd	Elected in 1910. Died.
Chester L. Mize	Republican	January 3, 1965 – January 3, 1971	2nd	Elected in 1964. Re-elected in 1966. Re-elected in 1968. Lost re-election to Roy.
Dennis Moore	Democratic	January 3, 1999 – January 3, 2011	3rd	Elected in 1998. Re-elected in 2000. Re-elected in 2002. Re-elected in 2004. Re-elected in 2006. Re-elected in 2008. Retired.
Horace Ladd Moore	Democratic	August 2, 1894 – March 3, 1895	2nd	Won contested election. Lost re-election to Miller.
Jerry Moran	Republican	January 3, 1997 – January 3, 2011	1st	Elected in 1996. Re-elected in 1998. Re-elected in 2000. Re-elected in 2002. Re-elected in 2004. Re-elected in 2006. Re-elected in 2008. Retired to run for U.S. senator.
Edmund Needham Morrill	Republican	March 4, 1883 – March 3, 1885	At-large	Elected in 1882. Redistricted to the 1st district.
Edmund Needham Morrill	Republican	March 4, 1885 – March 3, 1891	1st	Redistricted from the at-large district and re-elected in 1884. Re-elected in 1886. Re-elected in 1888. Retired.
Victor Murdock	Republican	May 26, 1903 – March 3, 1907	7th	Elected to finish Long's term. Re-elected in 1904. Redistricted to the 8th district.
Victor Murdock	Republican	March 4, 1907 – March 3, 1915	8th	Redistricted from the 7th district and re-elected in 1906. Re-elected in 1908. Re-elected in 1910. Re-elected in 1912. Retired to run for U.S. senator.
George A. Neeley	Democratic	January 9, 1912 – March 3, 1915	7th	Elected to finish Madison's term. Retired to run for U.S. senator.
Dick Nichols	Republican	January 3, 1991 – January 3, 1993	5th	Elected in 1990. Redistricted to the 4th district and lost renomination to Roger M. Grund Sr.
John G. Otis	Populist	March 4, 1891 – March 3, 1893	4th	Elected in 1890. Lost renomination.
Marcus Junius Parrott	Republican	March 4, 1857 – January 29, 1861	Territory	Elected in 1856 or 1857. Re-elected in 1858 or 1859. Kansas admitted as a state.
Edward White Patterson	Democratic	January 3, 1935 – January 3, 1939	3rd	Re-elected in 1934. Re-elected in 1936. Lost re-election to Winter.
Bishop W. Perkins	Republican	March 4, 1883 – March 3, 1885	At-large	Elected in 1882. Redistricted to the 3rd district.
Bishop W. Perkins	Republican	March 4, 1885 – March 3, 1891	3rd	Redistricted from the at-large district and re-elected in 1884. Re-elected in 1886. Re-elected in 1888. Lost re-election to Clover.
Mason S. Peters	Populist	March 4, 1897 – March 3, 1899	2nd	Elected in 1896. Lost re-election to Bowersock.
Samuel R. Peters	Republican	March 4, 1883 – March 3, 1885	At-large	Elected in 1882. Redistricted to the 7th district.
Samuel R. Peters	Republican	March 4, 1885 – March 3, 1891	7th	Redistricted from the at-large district and re-elected in 1884. Re-elected in 1886. Re-elected in 1888. Retired.
William A. Phillips	Republican	March 4, 1873 – March 3, 1875	At-large	Elected in 1872. Redistricted to the 1st district.
William A. Phillips	Republican	March 4, 1875 – March 3, 1879	1st	Redistricted from the At-large district and Re-elected in 1874. Re-elected in 1876. Lost renomination to Anderson.
Mike Pompeo	Republican	January 3, 2011 – January 23, 2017	4th	Elected in 2010. Re-elected in 2012. Re-elected in 2014. Re-elected in 2016. Resigned to become Director of the Central Intelligence Agency.
William A. Reeder	Republican	March 4, 1899 – March 3, 1911	6th	Elected in 1898. Re-elected in 1900. Re-elected in 1902. Re-elected in 1904. Re-elected in 1906. Re-elected in 1908. Lost renomination to Young.
Edward Herbert Rees	Republican	January 3, 1937 – January 3, 1961	4th	Elected in 1936. Re-elected in 1938. Re-elected in 1940. Re-elected in 1942. Re-elected in 1944. Re-elected in 1946. Re-elected in 1948. Re-elected in 1950. Re-elected in 1952. Re-elected in 1954. Re-elected in 1956. Re-elected in 1958. Retired.
Rollin R. Rees	Republican	March 4, 1911 – March 3, 1913	5th	Elected in 1910. Lost re-election to Helvering.
Edwin R. Ridgely	Populist	March 4, 1897 – March 3, 1901	3rd	Elected in 1896. Re-elected in 1898. Retired.
Pat Roberts	Republican	January 3, 1981 – January 3, 1997	1st	Elected in 1980. Re-elected in 1982. Re-elected in 1984. Re-elected in 1986. Re-elected in 1988. Re-elected in 1990. Re-elected in 1992. Re-elected in 1994. Retired to run for U.S. senator.
William R. Roy	Democratic	January 3, 1971 – January 3, 1975	2nd	Elected in 1970. Re-elected in 1972. Retired to run for U.S. senator.
Thomas Ryan	Republican	March 4, 1877 – March 3, 1885	3rd	Elected in 1876. Re-elected in 1878. Re-elected in 1880. Re-elected in 1882. Redistricted to the 4th district.
Thomas Ryan	Republican	March 4, 1885 – April 4, 1889	4th	Redistricted from the 3rd district and re-elected in 1884. Re-elected in 1886. Re-elected in 1888. Resigned to become U.S. Minister to Mexico.
Jim Ryun	Republican	November 27, 1996 – January 3, 2007	2nd	Elected in 1996 and seated early. Re-elected in 1998. Re-elected in 2000. Re-elected in 2002. Re-elected in 2004. Lost re-election to Boyda.
Derek Schmidt	Republican	January 3, 2025 – present	2nd	Elected in 2024.
Charles Frederick Scott	Republican	March 4, 1901 – March 3, 1907	At-large	Elected in 1900. Re-elected in 1902. Re-elected in 1904. Redistricted to the 2nd district.
Charles Frederick Scott	Republican	March 4, 1907 – March 3, 1911	2nd	Redistricted from the at-large district and re-elected in 1906. Re-elected in 1908. Lost re-election to Mitchell.
Errett P. Scrivner	Republican	September 14, 1943 – January 3, 1959	2nd	Elected to finish Guyer's term. Elected in 1944. Re-elected in 1946. Re-elected in 1948. Re-elected in 1950. Re-elected in 1952. Re-elected in 1954. Re-elected in 1956. Lost re-election to N. George.
Keith Sebelius	Republican	January 3, 1969 – January 3, 1981	1st	Elected in 1968. Re-elected in 1970. Re-elected in 1972. Re-elected in 1974. Re-elected in 1976. Re-elected in 1978. Retired.
Jouett Shouse	Democratic	March 4, 1915 – March 3, 1919	7th	Elected in 1914. Re-elected in 1916. Retired when appointed Assistant Secretary of the Treasury.
Garner E. Shriver	Republican	January 3, 1961 – January 3, 1977	4th	Elected in 1960. Re-elected in 1962. Re-elected in 1964. Re-elected in 1966. Re-elected in 1968. Re-elected in 1970. Re-elected in 1972. Re-elected in 1974. Lost re-election to Glickman.
Jerry Simpson	Populist	March 4, 1891 – March 3, 1895	7th	Elected in 1890. Re-elected in 1892. Lost re-election to Long.
Jerry Simpson	Populist	March 4, 1897 – March 3, 1899	7th	Elected in 1896. Lost re-election to Long.
Joe Skubitz	Republican	January 3, 1963 – December 31, 1978	5th	Elected in 1962. Re-elected in 1964. Re-elected in 1966. Re-elected in 1968. Re-elected in 1970. Re-elected in 1972. Re-elected in 1974. Re-elected in 1976. Retired and resigned early.
Jim Slattery	Democratic	January 3, 1983 – January 3, 1995	2nd	Elected in 1982. Re-elected in 1984. Re-elected in 1986. Re-elected in 1988. Re-elected in 1990. Re-elected in 1992. Retired to run for Governor of Kansas.
Wint Smith	Republican	January 3, 1947 – January 3, 1961	6th	Elected in 1946. Re-elected in 1948. Re-elected in 1950. Re-elected in 1952. Re-elected in 1954. Re-elected in 1956. Re-elected in 1958. Retired.
Vince Snowbarger	Republican	January 3, 1997 – January 3, 1999	3rd	Elected in 1996. Lost re-election to D. Moore.
Charles I. Sparks	Republican	March 4, 1929 – March 3, 1933	6th	Elected in 1928. Re-elected in 1930. Lost re-election to McCarthy.
William H. Sproul	Republican	March 4, 1923 – March 3, 1931	3rd	Elected in 1922. Re-elected in 1924. Re-elected in 1926. Re-elected in 1928. Retired to Run for U.S. senator.
James G. Strong	Republican	March 4, 1919 – March 3, 1933	5th	Elected in 1918. Re-elected in 1920. Re-elected in 1922. Re-elected in 1924. Re-elected in 1926. Re-elected in 1928. Re-elected in 1930. Redistricted to 1st and lost renomination to Lambertson.
Joseph Taggart	Democratic	November 7, 1911 – March 3, 1917	2nd	Elected to finish Mitchell's term. Re-elected in 1912. Re-elected in 1914. Lost re-election to E. Little.
Todd Tiahrt	Republican	January 3, 1995 – January 3, 2011	4th	Elected in 1994. Re-elected in 1996. Re-elected in 1998. Re-elected in 2000. Re-elected in 2002. Re-elected in 2004. Re-elected in 2006. Re-elected in 2008. Retired to run for U.S. Senator.
Jasper N. Tincher	Republican	March 4, 1919 – March 3, 1927	7th	Elected in 1918. Re-elected in 1920. Re-elected in 1922. Re-elected in 1924. Retired.
Erastus J. Turner	Republican	March 4, 1887 – March 3, 1891	6th	Elected in 1886. Re-elected in 1888. Retired.
William D. Vincent	Populist	March 4, 1897 – March 3, 1899	5th	Elected in 1896. Lost re-election to Calderhead.
Steve Watkins	Republican	January 3, 2019 – January 3, 2021	2nd	Elected in 2018. Lost renomination to LaTurner.
Hays B. White	Republican	March 4, 1919 – March 3, 1929	6th	Elected in 1918. Re-elected in 1920. Re-elected in 1922. Re-elected in 1924. Re-elected in 1926. Retired.
John Wilkins Whitfield	Democratic	December 20, 1854 – August 1, 1856	Territory	Elected in 1854. Seat was declared vacant.
John Wilkins Whitfield	Democratic	December 9, 1856 – March 3, 1857	Territory	Elected to finish his own term. Retired.
Bob Whittaker	Republican	January 3, 1979 – January 3, 1991	5th	Elected in 1978. Re-elected in 1980. Re-elected in 1982. Re-elected in 1984. Re-elected in 1986. Re-elected in 1988. Retired.
Abel Carter Wilder	Republican	March 4, 1863 – March 3, 1865	At-large	Elected in 1862. Retired.
Larry Winn	Republican	January 3, 1967 – January 3, 1985	3rd	Elected in 1966. Re-elected in 1968. Re-elected in 1970. Re-elected in 1972. Re-elected in 1974. Re-elected in 1976. Re-elected in 1978. Re-elected in 1980. Re-elected in 1982. Retired.
Thomas Daniel Winter	Republican	January 3, 1939 – January 3, 1947	3rd	Elected in 1938. Re-elected in 1940. Re-elected in 1942. Re-elected in 1944. Lost renomination to Meyer.
Kevin Yoder	Republican	January 3, 2011 – January 3, 2019	3rd	Elected in 2010. Re-elected in 2012. Re-elected in 2014. Re-elected in 2016. Lost re-election to Davids.
Isaac D. Young	Republican	March 4, 1911 – March 3, 1913	6th	Elected in 1910. Lost re-election to Connelly.

== See also ==
- Kansas's congressional delegations
- Kansas's congressional districts
- List of United States senators from Kansas
