= Kansas's 2nd congressional district =

U.S. House district for Kansas

Coordinates: 38.6°N 95.3°W

- Interactive map of district boundaries since January 3, 2023
- Representative: Derek Schmidt; R–Independence
- Distribution: 59.73% urban; 40.27% rural
- Population (2025): 737,136
- Median household income: $69,521
- Ethnicity: 69.8% White; 12.9% Hispanic; 8.4% Black; 5.6% Two or more races; 1.8% Asian; 1.0% Native American; 0.5% other
- Cook PVI: R+10

Kansas' 2nd congressional district is a congressional district in the U.S. state of Kansas that covers most of the eastern part of the state, except for the core of the Kansas City Metropolitan Area. The district encompasses less than a quarter of the state. The state capital of Topeka, the cities of Emporia, Junction City and Leavenworth and most of Kansas City are located within this district. The district is currently represented by Republican Derek Schmidt.

== History ==
Kansas had but one representative in the U.S. House of Representatives until after the 1870 U.S. census, which showed that the state was entitled to three members of the lower branch of the national legislature. In 1872, three representatives-at-large were elected, but by the act of March 2, 1874, the legislature divided the state into three districts. The 2nd congressional district was composed of the counties of Montgomery, Wilson, Labette, Cherokee, Crawford, Neosho, Bourbon, Allen, Anderson, Linn, Miami, Franklin, Johnson, Douglas and Wyandotte.

No changes were made in until after the 1880 U.S. census, which gave the state seven representatives. On March 5, 1883, Governor George Washington Glick approved an act of the legislature which reduced the 2nd congressional district to only include the counties of Wyandotte, Johnson, Douglas, Miami, Franklin, Anderson, Linn, Allen and Bourbon.

Although the 1890 U.S. census showed the population of Kansas to be large enough to entitle the state to eight representatives, no additional district was created until 1905. By the act of March 9, 1905, the state was divided into eight districts with the 2nd Congressional district being composed of the counties of Wyandotte, Johnson, Douglas, Miami, Franklin, Anderson, Linn, Allen and Bourbon.

Reapportionment for 2002 placed the western half of Lawrence as well as Miami County into the 2nd congressional district and cut out the counties of Geary, Montgomery and Nemaha.

Reapportionment in 2012 meant that the entirety of Lawrence was moved to the 2nd congressional district. The district's boundaries were altered to remove Manhattan, home of Kansas State University, and portions of Miami County while adding all of Montgomery County and Nemaha County and portions of Marshall County.

Reapportionment in 2022 moved the entirety of Lawrence to the 1st congressional district. The district's boundaries were also altered to move Anderson and Franklin counties and portions of Miami County to the 3rd congressional district. The entirety of Miami County is now in the 3rd congressional district. Most of Jackson, all of Jefferson and the remaining part of Marshall counties moved from the district to the 1st congressional district. The counties of Chase, Geary, Lyon, Marion, Morris and Wabaunsee all moved from the 1st congressional district to the district.

=== 2000 demographics ===
Following redistricting after the 2000 U.S. census, there were 672,102 people, 257,856 households, and 173,309 families residing in the district. The population density was 47.6/mi^{2} over a land area of 14,133 square miles (36,600 km^{2}). There were 280,213 housing units at an average density of 19.8/mi^{2}. The racial makeup of the district is 89.01% White, 5.06% Black or African American, 1.26% Native American, 0.97% Asian, 0.06% Pacific Islander, 1.52% from other races, and 2.12% from two or more races. Hispanic or Latino of any race were 3.81% of the population.

There were 257,856 households, out of which 34.60% had children under the age of 18 living with them, 54.48% were married couples living together, 9.20% had a female householder with no husband present, and 32.79% were non-families. 26.73% of all households were made up of individuals, and 10.63% had someone living alone who was 65 years of age or older. The average household size was 2.49 and the average family size was 3.02.

In the district the population distribution by age is 25.34% under the age of 18, 11.88% from 18 to 24, 27.54% from 25 to 44, 21.70% from 45 to 64, and 13.54% who were 65 years of age or older. The median age was 35.3 years. For every 100 females, there were 99.08 males. For every 100 females age 18 and over, there were 96.85 males.

The median income for a household in the district is $37,855, and the median income for a family was $47,095. Males had a median income of $32,033 versus $24,230 for females. The per capita income for the district was $18,595. About 7.1% of families and 11.2% of the population were below the poverty line, including 12.0% of those under age 18 and 9.3% of those age 65 or over.

Among the population aged 16 years and older, 64.5% was in the civilian labor force and 1.9% were in the armed forces. Of the employed civilian workers, 20.6% were government workers and 7.5% were self-employed. Management, professional, and related occupations employed 32.3% of the work force and sales and office occupations employ 25.4%. Only 0.8% were employed in farming, fishing, and forestry occupations. The largest employment by industry was: educational, health and social services, 24.5%; manufacturing, 12.3%; and retail trade, 11.4%. Agriculture, forestry, fishing and hunting, and mining industries only employed 3.0%.

== Composition ==
The 2nd district includes the entirety of the following counties, with the exceptions of Douglas and Jackson, which it shares with the 1st district, and Wyandotte, which it shares with the 3rd district. Douglas County cities within the 2nd district include Baldwin City, Eudora and Lecompton, while Jackson County cities include Netawaka and Whiting. The only Wyandotte County city within the 2nd district is a portion of Kansas City.

#	County	Seat	Population
1	Allen	Iola	12,412
5	Atchison	Atchison	16,016
11	Bourbon	Fort Scott	14,408
13	Brown	Hiawatha	9,250
17	Chase	Cottonwood Falls	2,579
21	Cherokee	Columbus	19,054
31	Coffey	Burlington	8,251
37	Crawford	Girard	38,764
43	Doniphan	Troy	7,493
45	Douglas	Lawrence	120,553
61	Geary	Junction City	35,047
85	Jackson	Holton	13,368
99	Labette	Oswego	19,728
103	Leavenworth	Leavenworth	83,518
107	Linn	Mound City	9,860
111	Lyon	Emporia	32,172
115	Marion	Marion	11,690
125	Montgomery	Independence	30,568
127	Morris	Council Grove	5,334
131	Nemaha	Seneca	10,114
133	Neosho	Erie	15,420
139	Osage	Lyndon	15,824
177	Shawnee	Topeka	177,746
197	Wabaunsee	Alma	7,057
205	Wilson	Fredonia	8,382
207	Woodson	Yates Center	3,115
209	Wyandotte	Kansas City	165,281

== List of members representing the district ==
Member (Residence)	Party	Years in office	Cong ress	Electoral history	District map and location
District created March 4, 1875
John R. Goodin (Humboldt)	Democratic	March 4, 1875 – March 3, 1877	44th	Elected in 1874. Lost re-election.	
Dudley C. Haskell (Lawrence)	Republican	March 4, 1877 – December 16, 1883	45th 46th 47th 48th	Elected in 1876. Re-elected in 1878. Re-elected in 1880. Re-elected in 1882. Died.	
Vacant		December 16, 1883 – March 21, 1884	48th		
Edward H. Funston (Iola)	Republican	March 21, 1884 – August 2, 1894	48th 49th 50th 51st 52nd 53rd	Elected to finish Haskell's term. Re-elected in 1884. Re-elected in 1886. Re-elected in 1888. Re-elected in 1890. Re-elected in 1892. Lost contested election.	
Horace L. Moore (Lawrence)	Democratic	August 2, 1894 – March 3, 1895	53rd	Won contested election. Lost re-election.	
Orrin L. Miller (Kansas City)	Republican	March 4, 1895 – March 3, 1897	54th	Elected in 1894. Retired.	
Mason S. Peters (Kansas City)	Populist	March 4, 1897 – March 3, 1899	55th	Elected in 1896. Lost re-election.	
Justin D. Bowersock (Lawrence)	Republican	March 4, 1899 – March 3, 1907	56th 57th 58th 59th	Elected in 1898. Re-elected in 1900. Re-elected in 1902. Re-elected in 1904. Retired.	
Charles F. Scott (Iola)	Republican	March 4, 1907 – March 3, 1911	60th 61st	Redistricted from the at-large district and re-elected in 1906. Re-elected in 1908. Lost re-election.	
Alexander C. Mitchell (Lawrence)	Republican	March 4, 1911 – July 7, 1911	62nd	Elected in 1910. Died.	
Vacant		July 7, 1911 – November 7, 1911	62nd		
Joseph Taggart (Kansas City)	Democratic	November 7, 1911 – March 3, 1917	62nd 63rd 64th	Elected to finish Mitchell's term. Re-elected in 1912. Re-elected in 1914. Lost re-election.	
Edward C. Little (Kansas City)	Republican	March 4, 1917 – June 27, 1924	65th 66th 67th 68th	Elected in 1916. Re-elected in 1918. Re-elected in 1920. Re-elected in 1922. Died.	
Vacant		June 27, 1924 – November 4, 1924	68th		
Ulysses S. Guyer (Kansas City)	Republican	November 4, 1924 – March 3, 1925	68th	Elected to finish Little's term. Lost re-election.	
Chauncey B. Little (Olathe)	Democratic	March 4, 1925 – March 3, 1927	69th	Elected in 1924. Lost re-election.	
Ulysses S. Guyer (Kansas City)	Republican	March 4, 1927 – June 5, 1943	70th 71st 72nd 73rd 74th 75th 76th 77th 78th	Elected in 1926. Re-elected in 1928. Re-elected in 1930. Re-elected in 1932. Re-elected in 1934. Re-elected in 1936. Re-elected in 1938. Re-elected in 1940. Re-elected in 1942. Died.	
Vacant		June 5, 1943 – September 14, 1943	78th		
Errett P. Scrivner (Kansas City)	Republican	September 14, 1943 – January 3, 1959	78th 79th 80th 81st 82nd 83rd 84th 85th	Elected to finish Guyer's term. Elected in 1944. Re-elected in 1946. Re-elected in 1948. Re-elected in 1950. Re-elected in 1952. Re-elected in 1954. Re-elected in 1956. Lost re-election.	
Newell A. George (Kansas City)	Democratic	January 3, 1959 – January 3, 1961	86th	Elected in 1958. Lost re-election.	
Robert F. Ellsworth (Lawrence)	Republican	January 3, 1961 – January 3, 1963	87th	Elected in 1960. Redistricted to the 3rd district.	
William H. Avery (Wakefield)	Republican	January 3, 1963 – January 3, 1965	88th	Redistricted from the 1st district and re-elected in 1962. Retired to run for Governor of Kansas.	
Chester L. Mize (Atchison)	Republican	January 3, 1965 – January 3, 1971	89th 90th 91st	Elected in 1964. Re-elected in 1966. Re-elected in 1968. Lost re-election.	
William Robert Roy (Topeka)	Democratic	January 3, 1971 – January 3, 1975	92nd 93rd	Elected in 1970. Re-elected in 1972. Retired to run for U.S. senator.	
Martha Elizabeth Keys (Manhattan)	Democratic	January 3, 1975 – January 3, 1979	94th 95th	Elected in 1974. Re-elected in 1976. Lost re-election.	
James Edmund Jeffries (Atchison)	Republican	January 3, 1979 – January 3, 1983	96th 97th	Elected in 1978. Re-elected in 1980. Retired.	
Jim Slattery (Topeka)	Democratic	January 3, 1983 – January 3, 1995	98th 99th 100th 101st 102nd 103rd	Elected in 1982. Re-elected in 1984. Re-elected in 1986. Re-elected in 1988. Re-elected in 1990. Re-elected in 1992. Retired to run for Governor of Kansas.	
Sam Brownback (Topeka)	Republican	January 3, 1995 – November 7, 1996	104th	Elected in 1994. Resigned November 27, 1996 retroactive to November 7, 1996 when elected U.S. senator.	
Vacant		November 7, 1996 – November 27, 1996	104th		
Jim Ryun (Topeka)	Republican	November 27, 1996 – January 3, 2007	104th 105th 106th 107th 108th 109th	Elected in 1996 and seated early to finish Brownback's term, having already been elected to the next term, under the provisions of K.S.A. 25-3503[d]. Re-elected in 1998. Re-elected in 2000. Re-elected in 2002. Re-elected in 2004. Lost re-election.	
Jim Ryun (Topeka)	Republican	November 27, 1996 – January 3, 2007	104th 105th 106th 107th 108th 109th	Elected in 1996 and seated early to finish Brownback's term, having already been elected to the next term, under the provisions of K.S.A. 25-3503[d]. Re-elected in 1998. Re-elected in 2000. Re-elected in 2002. Re-elected in 2004. Lost re-election.	2003–2013
Nancy Boyda (Topeka)	Democratic	January 3, 2007 – January 3, 2009	110th	Elected in 2006. Lost re-election.	2003–2013
Lynn Jenkins (Topeka)	Republican	January 3, 2009 – January 3, 2019	111th 112th 113th 114th 115th	Elected in 2008. Re-elected in 2010. Re-elected in 2012. Re-elected in 2014. Re-elected in 2016. Retired.	2003–2013
Lynn Jenkins (Topeka)	Republican	January 3, 2009 – January 3, 2019	111th 112th 113th 114th 115th	Elected in 2008. Re-elected in 2010. Re-elected in 2012. Re-elected in 2014. Re-elected in 2016. Retired.	2013–2023
Steve Watkins (Topeka)	Republican	January 3, 2019 – January 3, 2021	116th	Elected in 2018. Lost renomination.	2013–2023
Jake LaTurner (Topeka)	Republican	January 3, 2021 – January 3, 2025	117th 118th	Elected in 2020. Re-elected in 2022. Retired.	2013–2023
Jake LaTurner (Topeka)	Republican	January 3, 2021 – January 3, 2025	117th 118th	Elected in 2020. Re-elected in 2022. Retired.	2023–present
Derek Schmidt (Independence)	Republican	January 3, 2025 – present	119th	Elected in 2024. Re-elected in 2026.	2023–present

== Recent election results from statewide races ==
Year	Office	Results
2008	President	McCain 52% - 46%
2008	Senate	Roberts 56% - 44%
2012	President	Romney 55% - 43%
2016	President	Trump 56% - 37%
2016	Senate	Moran 60% - 35%
2018	Governor	Kelly 49% - 42%
2018	Secretary of State	Schwab 52% - 45%
2018	Attorney General	Schmidt 60% - 40%
2018	Treasurer	LaTurner 58% - 42%
2020	President	Trump 57% - 41%
2020	Senate	Marshall 53% - 41%
2022	Senate	Moran 61% - 35%
2022	Governor	Kelly 49% - 48%
2022	Secretary of State	Schwab 59% - 38%
2022	Attorney General	Kobach 52% - 48%
2022	Treasurer	Johnson 55% - 41%
2024	President	Trump 59% - 39%

== Recent election results ==
=== 2002 ===
Kansas's 2nd Congressional District Election (2002)
Party	Candidate	Votes	%
Republican	Jim Ryun*	126,169	60.45
Democratic	Dan Lykins	78,286	37.51
Libertarian	Art Clack	4,263	2.04
Total votes		208,718	100.00
Republican hold			

=== 2004 ===
Kansas's 2nd Congressional District Election (2004)
Party	Candidate	Votes	%
Republican	Jim Ryun*	165,325	56.15
Democratic	Nancy Boyda	121,532	41.28
Libertarian	Dennis Hawver	7,579	2.57
Total votes		294,436	100.00
Republican hold			

=== 2006 ===
Kansas's 2nd Congressional District Election (2006)
Party	Candidate	Votes	%
Democratic	Nancy Boyda	111,759	50.60
Republican	Jim Ryun*	104,128	47.15
Reform	Roger Tucker	4,980	2.26
Total votes		220,867	100.00
Democratic gain from Republican			

=== 2008 ===
Kansas's 2nd Congressional District Election (2008)
Party	Candidate	Votes	%
Republican	Lynn Jenkins	155,532	50.61
Democratic	Nancy Boyda*	142,013	46.21
Reform	Leslie Martin	5,080	1.65
Libertarian	Robert Garrard	4,683	1.52
Total votes		262,027	100.00
Republican gain from Democratic			

=== 2010 ===
Kansas's 2nd Congressional District Election (2010)
Party	Candidate	Votes	%
Republican	Lynn Jenkins*	130,034	63.13
Democratic	Cheryl Hudspeth	66,588	32.33
Libertarian	Robert Garrard	9,353	4.54
Total votes		205,975	100.00
Republican hold			

=== 2012 ===
Kansas's 2nd Congressional District Election (2012)
Party	Candidate	Votes	%
Republican	Lynn Jenkins*	167,463	57.0
Democratic	Tobias Schlingensiepen	113,735	38.7
Libertarian	Dennis Hawver	12,520	4.2
Total votes		293,718	100.00
Republican hold			

=== 2014 ===
Kansas's 2nd Congressional District Election (2014)
Party	Candidate	Votes	%
Republican	Lynn Jenkins*	128,742	57.0
Democratic	Margie Wakefield	87,153	38.6
Libertarian	Christopher Clemmons	9,791	4.3
Total votes		225,686	99.9
Republican hold			

=== 2016 ===
Kansas's 2nd Congressional District Election (2016)
Party	Candidate	Votes	%
Republican	Lynn Jenkins*	181,228	60.9
Democratic	Britani Potter	96,840	32.5
Libertarian	James Houston Bales	19,333	6.5
Total votes		297,401	99.9
Republican hold			

=== 2018 ===
Kansas's 2nd Congressional District Election (2018)
Party	Candidate	Votes	%
Republican	Steve Watkins	126,098	47.6
Democratic	Paul Davis	123,859	46.8
Libertarian	Kelly Standley	14,731	5.6
Total votes		264,688	100
Republican hold			

=== 2020 ===
Kansas's 2nd Congressional District Election (2020)
Party	Candidate	Votes	%
Republican	Jake LaTurner	185,464	55.2
Democratic	Michelle De La Isla	136,650	40.6
Libertarian	Robert Garrard	14,201	4.2
Total votes		336,315	100.0
Republican hold			

=== 2022 ===
Kansas's 2nd Congressional District Election (2022)
Party	Candidate	Votes	%
Republican	Jake LaTurner (incumbent)	134,506	57.6
Democratic	Patrick Schmidt	98,852	42.4
Total votes		233,358	100.0
Republican hold			

=== 2024 ===
Kansas's 2nd Congressional District Election (2024)
Party	Candidate	Votes	%
Republican	Derek Schmidt	172,847	57.1
Democratic	Nancy Boyda	115,685	38.2
Libertarian	John Hauer	14,229	4.7
Total votes		302,761	100.0
Republican hold			

== See also ==
- Kansas's congressional delegations
- Kansas's congressional districts
- List of United States congressional districts
