= Martha Keys =

American politician (1930–2024)

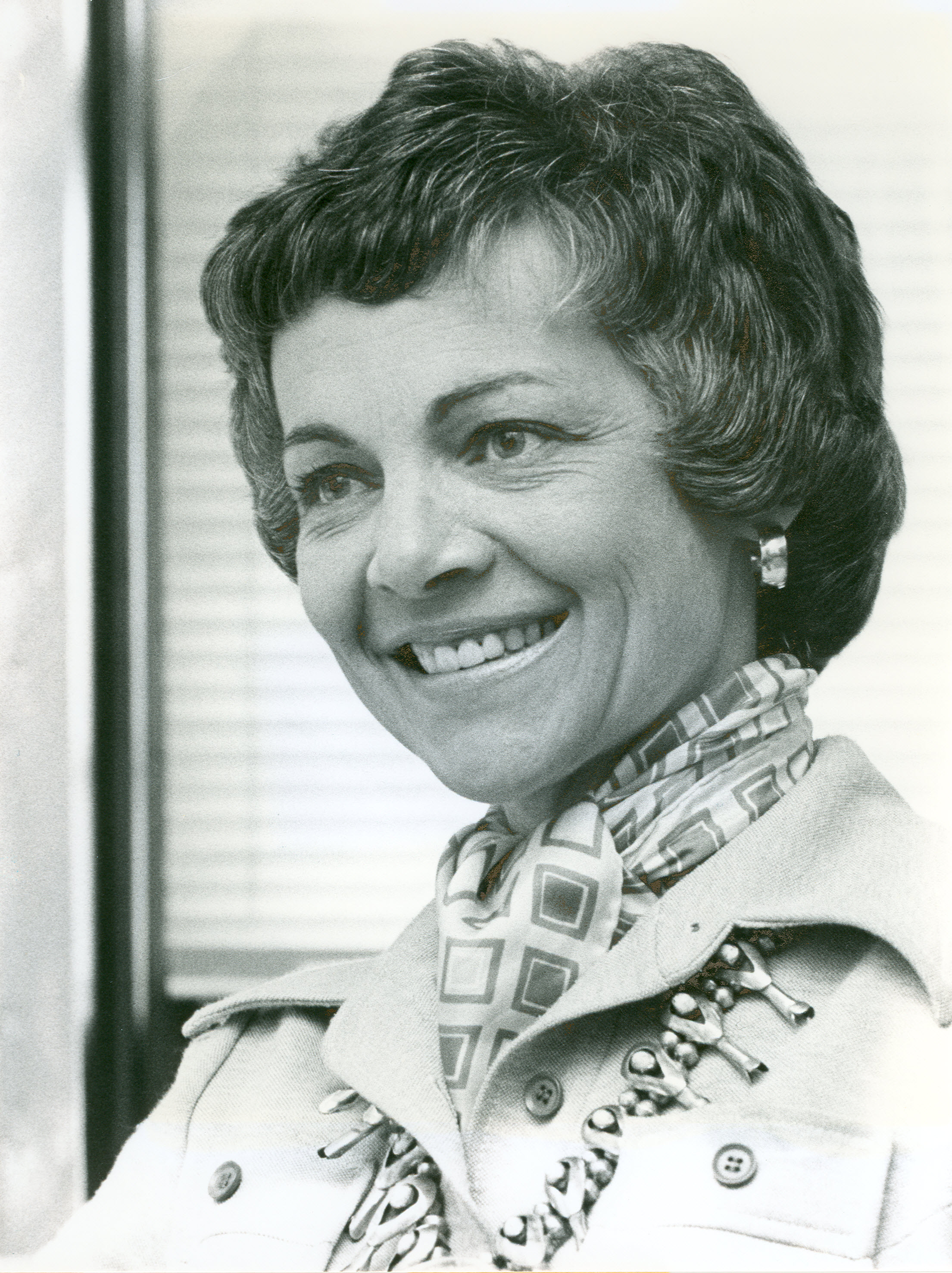

Member of the U.S. House of Representatives from Kansas's 2nd district
- In office January 3, 1975 – January 3, 1979
- Preceded by: William R. Roy
- Succeeded by: James E. Jeffries

Personal details
- Born: Martha Elizabeth Ludwig; August 10, 1930 Hutchinson, Kansas, U.S.
- Died: December 19, 2024 (aged 94) Locust Grove, Virginia, U.S.
- Party: Democratic
- Spouses: Sam Keys (m. 1949; div. 1975) Andrew Jacobs, Jr. (m. 1976; sep. 1981)
- Children: 4
- Relatives: Gary Hart (brother-in-law)
- Education: University of Missouri–Kansas City (BA)

Martha Elizabeth Keys (née Ludwig; August 10, 1930 – December 19, 2024) was an American politician who served in the U.S. House of Representatives from Kansas from 1975 to 1979.

== Early life and education ==
Keys was born in Hutchinson, Kansas, the daughter of Clara Krey and S.T. Ludwig. Keys graduated from Paseo High School in Kansas City, Missouri, in 1945. She attended Olivet College from 1946 to 1947 and earned a Bachelor of Arts degree at the University of Missouri–Kansas City in 1951.

== Career ==
Keys was a Democratic campaigner in 1964 and 1968. She ran the McGovern presidential campaign in Kansas in 1972. When Bill Roy retired from the U.S. Congress, her brother-in-law Senator Gary Hart, a Colorado Democrat, persuaded her to run for the seat.

She was elected a Democrat to the United States House of Representatives from Manhattan, Kansas in 1974 and served two terms before being defeated for reelection in 1978. While serving in the House of Representatives, Keys and her husband divorced, and she was remarried to fellow Congressman Andrew Jacobs Jr. They separated in 1981 and eventually divorced.

She then served as a special adviser to the Secretary of Health, Education, and Welfare from February 1979 to May 1980 and as an assistant secretary of education from June 1980 to January 1981. In 1982, Keys was elected to the Common Cause National Governing Board. Afterwards, she worked as a consultant and as director of the Center for a New Democracy from 1985 to 1986.

== Personal life and death ==
She married Sam Keys, a university professor and, later, dean of the College of Education at Kansas State University. Keys's sister, Lee, was married to former U.S. Senator and presidential candidate Gary Hart until her death in 2021. Keys died in Locust Grove, Virginia, on December 19, 2024, at the age of 94.

== See also ==
- Women in the United States House of Representatives

U.S. House of Representatives
Preceded by William R. Roy	Member of the U.S. House of Representatives from Kansas's 2nd congressional district 1975–1979	Succeeded by James E. Jeffries
