= Edward H. Funston =

American politician (1836–1911)

Edward Hogue Funston
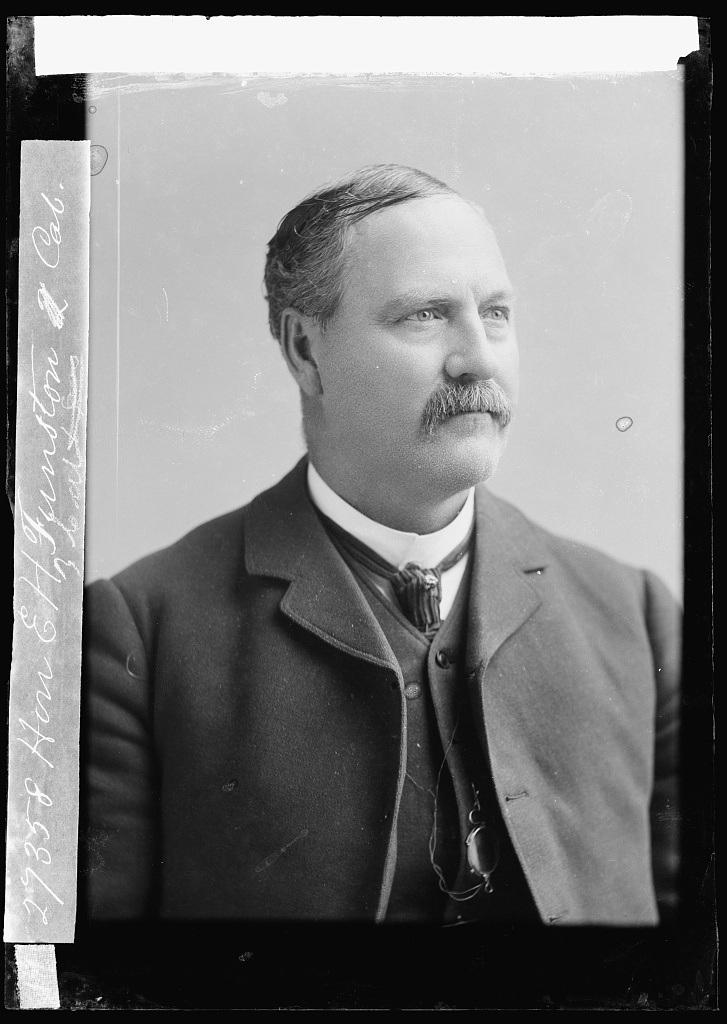
- Funston c. 1880

Member of the U.S. House of Representatives from Kansas's 2nd district
- In office March 21, 1884 – August 2, 1894
- Preceded by: Dudley C. Haskell
- Succeeded by: Horace L. Moore

Member of the Kansas Senate
- In office 1880-1884

Member of the Kansas House of Representatives
- In office 1873-1876

Personal details
- Born: September 16, 1836 New Carlisle, Ohio, U.S.
- Died: September 10, 1911 (aged 74) Iola, Kansas, U.S.
- Resting place: Iola Cemetery, Iola, Kansas, U.S.
- Party: Republican
- Spouse: Anne Eliza Mitchell Funston (1843-1917) (m. 1861)
- Children: Frederick Funston; Ella F. Funston Eckdall; Edward H. Funston Jr.

Military service
- Allegiance: United States of America Union
- Branch/service: United States Army Union Army
- Years of service: 1861–1865
- Rank: 1st Lieutenant
- Unit: 16th Ohio Battery

Edward Hogue Funston (September 16, 1836 – September 10, 1911) was an American politician who was a U.S. representative from Kansas. He was the father of general Frederick Funston.

== Biography ==
Funston was born near New Carlisle, Ohio on September 16, 1836. He attended the country schools of New Carlisle, then Linden Hill Academy in New Carlisle and Marietta College in Ohio.

He taught school, and during the American Civil War, entered the Union Army in 1861 as lieutenant in the Sixteenth Ohio Battery. He participated in the principal engagements along the Mississippi River and mustered out in 1865.

He moved to a farm in Carlyle, Kansas in 1867. Funston served as member of the Kansas House of Representatives (1873–1876) and was Speaker in 1875. He served in the Kansas Senate (1880–1884), and was Senate President in 1880.

Funston was elected as a Republican to the 48th Congress to fill the vacancy caused by the death of Dudley C. Haskell. He was reelected to the 49th and to the three succeeding Congresses and served from March 21, 1884, to March 3, 1893. He served as chairman of the Agriculture Committee (Fifty-first Congress).

He presented credentials as a Member-elect to the 53rd Congress and served from March 4, 1893, until August 2, 1894, when he was succeeded by Horace L. Moore, who successfully contested the election. After leaving Congress, Funston returned to his Kansas farm.

He died at his home in Iola, Kansas, on September 10, 1911, and was interred in Iola Cemetery.

== Family ==
In 1861, Funston married 18-year-old Ann Eliza Mitchell of West Charleston, Ohio; she was a cousin of his Civil War battery commander and a great-grandniece of Daniel Boone. Their children included: Frederick; James Burton; Pogue Warwick; Ella (Eckdall); Aldo; and Edward H. Jr. They were also the parents of two other children, a boy and a girl, who died in infancy.

Frederick Funston went on to become a major general in the United States Army and was a recipient of the Medal of Honor.

== Sources ==
=== Books ===
- Blackmar, Frank Wilson (1912). Kansas: A Cyclopedia of State History, Embracing Events, Institutions, Industries, Counties, Cities, Towns, Prominent Persons, Etc. Standard Publishing Company. pp. 703.

=== Newspapers ===
- "Fred Funston's Restless Life of Adventure". Chicago Tribune. Chicago, IL. May 7, 1899. p. 33.
- "Hon E. H. Funston Dead". Daily Republican. Cherryvale, KS. September 12, 1911. p. 1.

=== Internet ===
- Denger, Mark J. (February 8, 2016). "Major-General Frederick Funston, U.S.V." Californians and the Military. Sacramento, CA: California Center for Military History.

== See also ==
U.S. House of Representatives
Preceded by Dudley C. Haskell	Member of the U.S. House of Representatives from Kansas's 2nd congressional district March 21, 1884 – August 2, 1894	Succeeded by Horace L. Moore
