= Dudley C. Haskell =

American politician (1842–1883)

Dudley Chase Haskell
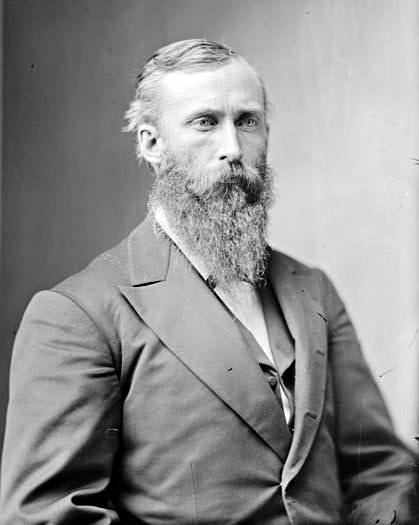

Member of the U.S. House of Representatives from Kansas's 2nd district
- In office March 4, 1877 – December 16, 1883
- Preceded by: John R. Goodin
- Succeeded by: Edward H. Funston

Member of the Kansas House of Representatives
- In office 1872; 1875–1876

Personal details
- Born: March 23, 1842 Springfield, Vermont, US
- Died: December 16, 1883 (aged 41) Washington, D.C., US
- Party: Republican
- Profession: Politician, merchant

Military service
- Allegiance: United States of America
- Branch/service: Union Army
- Battles/wars: Civil War

Dudley Chase Haskell (March 23, 1842 – December 16, 1883) was an American merchant, Civil War veteran, and Republican Party politician from the Lawrence, Kansas, area. He first served several terms in the Kansas House of Representatives, where he was elected as Speaker in 1876. That year he was elected to Congress, and served several terms until his death in office in 1883.

As a congressman, Haskell served as chairman of the Committee on Indian Affairs from 1881 to 1883. In that capacity, he helped gain congressional authorization for construction of three off-reservation Indian boarding schools, and the location of one in Lawrence, Kansas. It opened in 1884, and was named for him in 1887. It has since developed as Haskell Indian Nations University, with its most famous alumnus being Jim Thorpe.

== Biography ==
Haskell was born in Springfield, Vermont, in 1842, a son of Franklin and Almira (Chase) Haskell. His siblings included John G. Haskell. Haskell moved with his parents in 1855 to Lawrence, Kansas. He returned to Vermont to attend schools in Springfield in 1857 and 1858.

After beginning work as a shoe merchant, he moved west in 1859 to follow the Pike's Peak Gold Rush. He lived in Pikes Peak, Colorado, until 1861, when he returned to Missouri to enter Union ranks after war broke out.

During the Civil War, Haskell served as an assistant to the quartermaster of the Union Army in Missouri, Arkansas, Kansas, and the Indian Territory in 1861 and 1862.

== Post-Civil War years ==
He left the army and entered Williston’s Seminary in Easthampton, Massachusetts, in 1863 for further education. He graduated from Yale College in 1865, when he was 23.

Afterward, he returned to Lawrence, Kansas, where he engaged in the shoe business from 1865 to 1867. He entered politics with the Republican Party and was a member of the Kansas House of Representatives in 1872, 1875 and 1876, serving as Speaker of the House in 1876.

In 1876 Haskell was elected a Republican from Kansas's 2nd congressional district to the United States House of Representatives, serving from 1877 until his death in Washington, D.C., on December 16, 1883. There, he served as chairman of the Committee on Indian Affairs from 1881 to 1883. He believed in education for Native American children and supported legislation to authorize construction of three off-reservation Indian boarding schools, to be located in Nebraska, Kansas, and Indian Territory. He gained location of the Kansas school in his hometown of Lawrence. It opened with 22 elementary school students but soon grew. It was named Haskell Institute in his honor four years after his death.

His body was returned to Lawrence, where he was interred in Oak Hill Cemetery.

Haskell had married and had a family. Among his descendants was grandson Otis Halbert Holmes, who also became a politician. Holmes grew up in Eastern Washington, and served eight terms from there as a U.S. representative (R-WA).

== Legacy and honors ==
- The off-reservation Indian boarding school that he secured in Lawrence was named the Haskell Institute in 1887 in his honor. Since the mid-20th century, it has developed as the Haskell Indian Nations University.
- He is the namesake of Haskell County in southwestern Kansas

== See also ==
- Haskell Indian Nations University
- List of members of the United States Congress who died in office (1790–1899)

U.S. House of Representatives
Preceded by John R. Goodin	Member of the U.S. House of Representatives from Kansas's 2nd congressional district March 4, 1877 – December 16, 1883	Succeeded by Edward H. Funston
