= Horace Ladd Moore =

American politician (1837–1914)

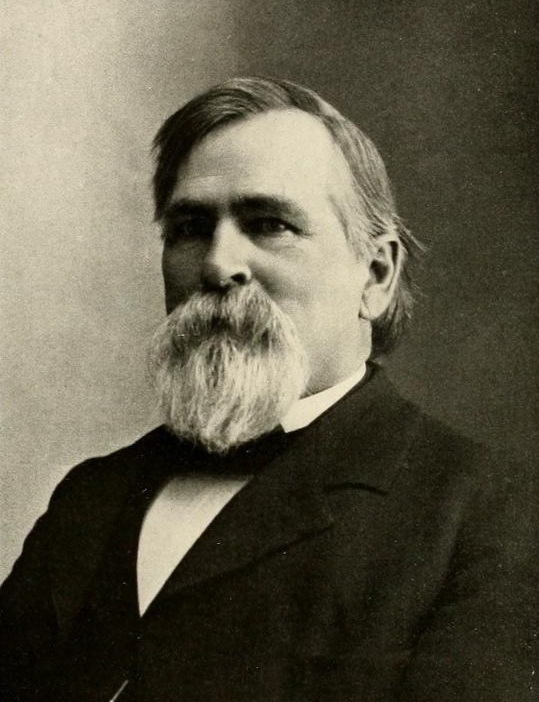

Member of the U.S. House of Representatives from Kansas's 2nd district
- In office August 2, 1894 – March 3, 1895
- Preceded by: Edward H. Funston
- Succeeded by: Orrin Larrabee Miller

Personal details
- Born: February 25, 1837 Mantua, Ohio, US
- Died: May 1, 1914 (aged 77) Lawrence, Kansas, US
- Party: Democratic

Military service
- Allegiance: United States of America
- Branch/service: Union Army
- Rank: Lieutenant colonel
- Unit: 4th Regiment, Arkansas Volunteer Cavalry; 2nd Regiment, Kansas Volunteer Infantry
- Battles/wars: Civil War

Horace Ladd Moore (February 25, 1837 – May 1, 1914) was a U.S. representative from Kansas.

Moore was born in Mantua, Ohio and attended the common schools and the Western Reserve Eclectic Institute in Hiram, Ohio. He moved to Lawrence, Kansas, in 1858. He studied law and one month after his admission to the bar enlisted in the Union Army in the Second Regiment, Kansas Volunteer Infantry, on May 14, 1861, and served continuously until June 30, 1865, when he was mustered out of the service as lieutenant colonel of the Fourth Regiment, Arkansas Volunteer Cavalry. As major of the Eighteenth and colonel of the Nineteenth Regiments of Kansas Cavalry, he served against the Indians on the Plains in 1867 and 1868. He again engaged in the practice of law and later, from 1886 to 1892, engaged in the wholesale grocery business in Trinidad, Colorado. He served as treasurer of Douglas County, Kansas, in 1886 and 1887.

He successfully contested as a Democrat the election of Edward H. Funston to the Fifty-third Congress and served from August 2, 1894, until March 3, 1895. He was an unsuccessful candidate for reelection in 1894 to the Fifty-fourth Congress. He served as vice president of a national bank in Lawrence, Kansas, until his death on May 1, 1914. He was interred in Oak Hill Cemetery.

U.S. House of Representatives
Preceded by Edward H. Funston	Member of the U.S. House of Representatives from Kansas's 2nd congressional district August 2, 1894 – March 3, 1895	Succeeded by Orrin L. Miller
