= William R. Roy =

American politician

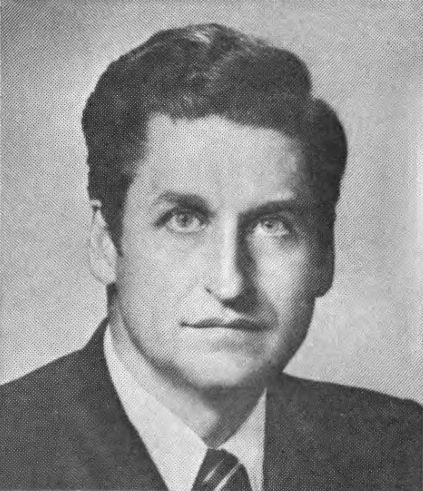

Member of the U.S. House of Representatives from Kansas's 2nd district
- In office January 3, 1971 – January 3, 1975
- Preceded by: Chester L. Mize
- Succeeded by: Martha Keys

Personal details
- Born: William Robert Roy; February 23, 1926 Bloomington, Illinois, U.S.
- Died: May 26, 2014 (aged 88) Topeka, Kansas, U.S.
- Party: Democratic
- Spouse: Jane Twining Osterhoudt
- Children: 6, incl. Bill Roy Jr.
- Education: Illinois Wesleyan University (BS); Northwestern University (MD); Washburn University (JD)
- Occupation: Physician, politician, newspaper columnist

Military service
- Allegiance: United States of America
- Branch/service: United States Air Force
- Years of service: 1953–1955
- Rank: Captain

William Robert Roy (February 23, 1926 – May 26, 2014), also known as Bill Roy, was a United States representative from Kansas, a physician, and a columnist for The Topeka Capital-Journal. He was the Democratic nominee for U.S Senator from Kansas in the 1974 and 1978 senate elections, but lost both races.

== Early life and career ==
Roy was born in Bloomington, Illinois, and attended the public schools in nearby Lexington and earned a B.S. from Illinois Wesleyan University in 1945, followed by a B.M. from Northwestern University Medical School in Chicago in 1948. He received an M.D. from Northwestern in 1949 as well as a J.D. from Washburn University Law School in Topeka, Kansas, in 1970. He did his obstetrics and gynecology residency at Detroit Receiving Hospital. Roy served in the United States Air Force from 1953 to 1955, and was a military doctor at Forbes Air Force Base in Topeka; he was discharged with the rank of captain. He practiced medicine in Topeka from 1955 to 1970

Roy was elected as a Democrat to the Ninety-second and Ninety-third Congresses (January 3, 1971 – January 3, 1975). He changed his registration in 1970 to run as a Democrat.

He did not run for reelection to the House in 1974, but instead ran for the United States Senate. In a bitter race, he lost to incumbent Senator Bob Dole only by a few thousand votes, which was the closest margin of Dole's congressional career. In a 1996 interview with PBS, he explained his decision to seek election to the Senate, saying, "I was far from an admirer of Bob Dole, I'll tell you that. He'd been around and he had been pretty much a hatchet man, both in Kansas, and as far as President Nixon was concerned. And so I saw it as a wonderful opportunity to take him out of politics, which I thought was very important at that time." He ran for the U.S. Senate again in 1978 but lost to Nancy Kassebaum. He resumed the practice of medicine in Topeka until 1989. He sought a rematch with Kassebaum in 1990 and won the Democratic primary, but dropped out of the race, citing personal issues. His replacement was runner-up Dick Williams.

In addition to his political races, Roy served as a member of the Kansas Board of Regents. Since 1989, Roy was a regular columnist for The Topeka Capital-Journal. His columns often reflected a liberal perspective, including support for abortion rights and opposition to the policies of President George W. Bush. His 2001–2002 columns in The Topeka Metro News rallied sentiment to stop the sale of Kansas Blue Cross Blue Shield to Anthem of Indianapolis.

Roy died in Topeka on May 26, 2014, of congestive heart failure.

Party political offices
Preceded by William I. Robinson	Democratic nominee for U.S. Senator from Kansas (Class 3); 1974	Succeeded by John Simpson
Preceded by Arch Tetzlaff	Democratic nominee for U.S. Senator from Kansas (Class 2); 1978	Succeeded by James R. Maher
Preceded by James R. Maher	Democratic nominee for U.S. Senator from Kansas (Class 2); Withdrew; 1990	Succeeded by Dick Williams
U.S. House of Representatives
Preceded by Chester L. Mize	Member of the U.S. House of Representatives from Kansas's 2nd congressional district 1971–1975	Succeeded by Martha Elizabeth Keys
