= Stephen A. Cobb =

American politician (1833–1878)

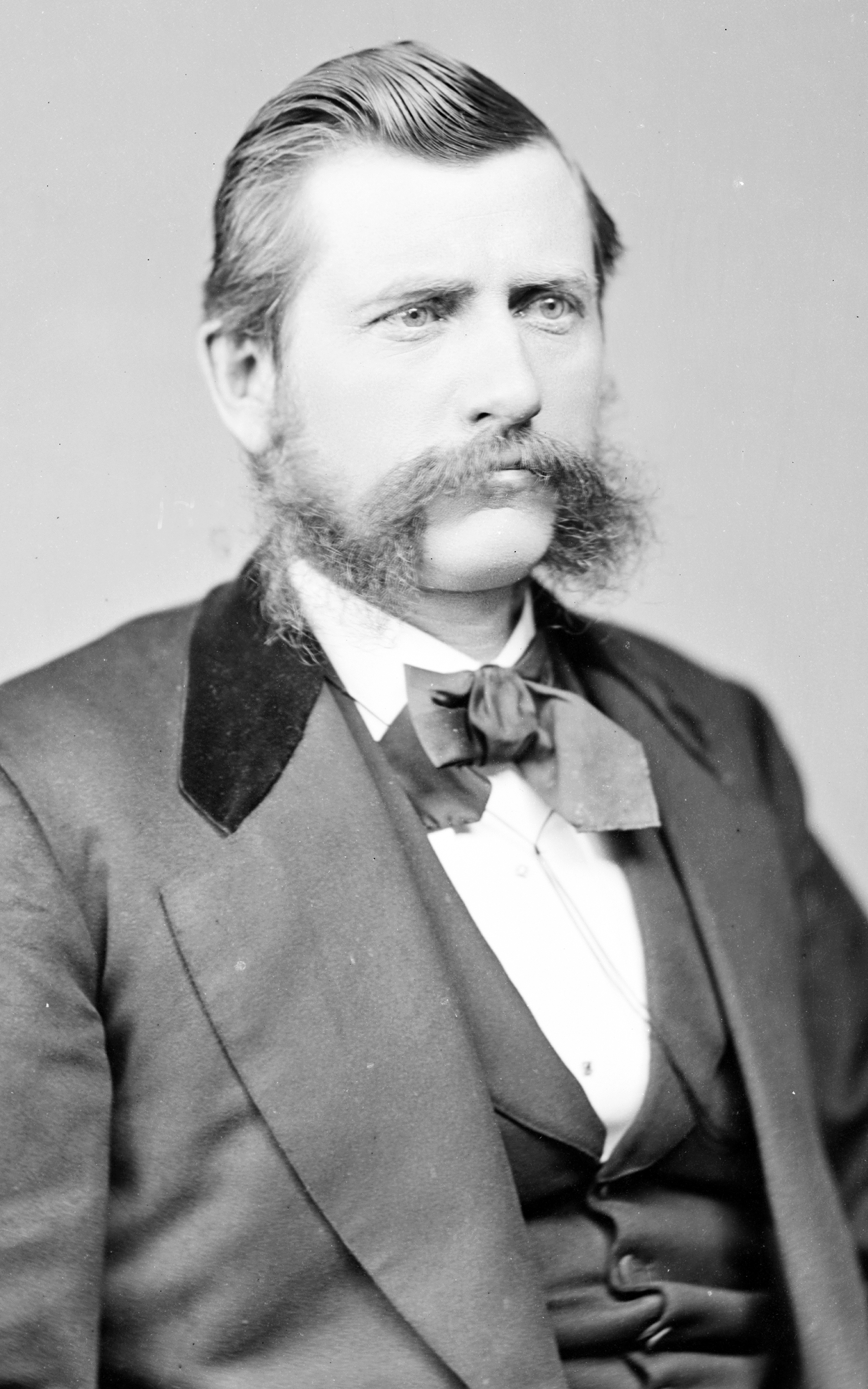

Member of the U.S. House of Representatives from Kansas's at-large district
- In office March 4, 1873 – March 3, 1875
- Preceded by: Seat created
- Succeeded by: Seat eliminated

Member of the Kansas House of Representatives
- In office 1872

Member of the Kansas State Senate
- In office 1862; 1869; 1870

Personal details
- Born: June 17, 1833 Madison, Maine
- Died: August 24, 1878 (aged 45) Kansas City, Kansas
- Party: Republican

Stephen Alonzo Cobb (June 17, 1833 – August 24, 1878) was a U.S. representative from Kansas.

Born in Madison, Maine, Cobb attended the common schools. He moved with his father to Minnesota in 1850, where Stephen found work in the lumber business. He studied languages and prepared for college. He entered Beloit College, Beloit, Wisconsin, in 1854, where he was a student for two years. He graduated from Brown University, Providence, Rhode Island, in 1858. He settled in Wyandotte, Kansas, in 1859 and commenced the practice of law. He entered the Union Army in 1862. He became captain and commissary sergeant of Volunteers on May 18, 1864. Brevetted major August 16, 1865, and honorably discharged on September 23, 1865. He served as mayor of Wyandotte in 1862 and again in 1868. He served in the State senate in 1862, 1869, and 1870. He served as member of the State house of representatives in 1872 and served as speaker.

Cobb was elected as a Republican to the Forty-third Congress (March 4, 1873 – March 3, 1875). He was an unsuccessful candidate for reelection in 1874 to the Forty-fourth Congress. He died in Wyandotte (now a part of Kansas City), Kansas, August 24, 1878. He was interred in Oak Grove Cemetery, Kansas City, Kansas.

== Notes ==
U.S. House of Representatives
Preceded by Seat created	Member of the U.S. House of Representatives from Kansas's at-large congressional district 1873–1875	Succeeded by Seat eliminated
