= Chester L. Mize =

American politician

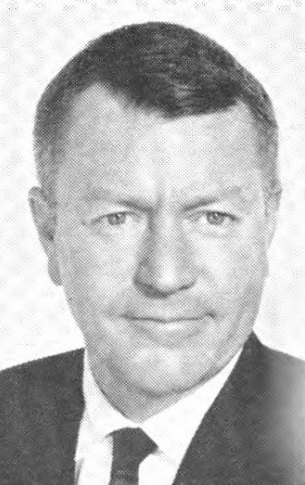
- From 1969's Pocket Congressional Directory of the Ninety-First Congress

Member of the U.S. House of Representatives from Kansas's 2nd district
- In office January 3, 1965 – January 3, 1971
- Preceded by: William Henry Avery
- Succeeded by: William R. Roy

Personal details
- Born: December 25, 1917 Atchison, Kansas, U.S.
- Died: January 11, 1994 (aged 76) La Jolla, California, U.S.
- Party: Republican
- Spouse: Elizabeth Muchnic
- Children: 3
- Education: University of Kansas School of Business
- Occupation: Businessman; Rancher; Farmer

Military service
- Allegiance: United States of America
- Branch/service: United States Navy
- Years of service: 1941-1945
- Rank: Lieutenant Commander
- Battles/wars: World War II: South Pacific Theater
- Awards: Bronze Star Medal with Combat V

Chester Louis Mize (December 25, 1917 – January 11, 1994) was a Republican member of the United States House of Representatives from Kansas.

Mize was a native of Atchison, Kansas, and attended the University of Kansas School of Business. He served in the United States Navy during World War II, and received the Bronze Star Medal with Combat V.

After the war, Mize was involved in his family's wholesale hardware business, and was an officer of several other corporations, in addition to owning and operating a farm and a cattle ranch. Mize also served on the Atchison school board, and was active in several other civic organizations, including the board of trustees of Mount St. Scholastica College.

In 1964, Mize was elected to the U.S. House of Representatives. He served three terms, 1965 to 1971, and was an unsuccessful candidate for reelection in 1970. After leaving Congress, Mize served as chairman of the United States Tariff Commission in 1971. In retirement, he resided in Naples, Florida before moving to La Jolla, California. He died in La Jolla on January 11, 1994, and was buried in Atchison.

== Early life ==
Mize was born in Atchison, Kansas on December 25, 1917. He attended the public schools of Atchison, and graduated from Atchison High School. He then studied at the University of Kansas School of Business from 1935 to 1939.

== World War II ==
He joined the United States Naval Reserve in 1940, where he served on active duty in the South Pacific Theater from 1941 to 1945 on board the USS Hornet. He was released to inactive service as a lieutenant commander at the end of the war, and was awarded the Bronze Star with Combat V.

== Career ==
After World War II, Mize served in a number of leadership positions in business, including succeeding his father as treasurer of Blish, Mize & Silliman wholesale hardware. He served as vice president of Locomotive Finished Materials Co. from 1951 to 1958, and as vice president of Valley Co., Inc. from 1958 to 1964. He owned and operated a cattle ranch in New Mexico and a farm in Atchison County, Kansas, where he was a member of the Atchison School Board.

Mize served as chairman of the board of trustees of Mount St. Scholastica College in Atchison. He also served as member of the School of Business Administration Advisory Board and the athletic board of the University of Kansas, and was president of the school's alumni association. In addition, Mize was a member of the Phi Delta Theta social fraternity.

Mize was an active member of the Episcopal Church. In addition, he was a member of the Kansas Farm Bureau, Kansas Chamber of Commerce, Elks Club, American Legion, and Veterans of Foreign Wars.

== Congressman ==
Mize was elected as a Republican to the Eighty-ninth, Ninetieth, and Ninety-first Congresses (January 3, 1965 – January 3, 1971).

Mize served on the House Banking and Currency Committee, and was a member of House Republican Conference task forces on Aging, the United Nations, and Latin America. He was also interested in government farm policy, as well as several conservation and flood control projects that were planned for or under construction in his district.

In 1970, Mize was an unsuccessful candidate for reelection to the Ninety-second Congress. He served as chairman of the United States Tariff Commission in 1971.

== Death and burial ==
In retirement, Mize was a resident of first Naples, Florida, and then La Jolla, California. He died in La Jolla of bladder cancer on January 11, 1994. He was buried Mount Vernon Cemetery in Atchison, Kansas.

== Family ==
Mize was married to Elizabeth Muchnic Mize. They later divorced, and in 1985 Elizabeth Mize married Paul Elicker. Chester and Elizabeth Mize were the parents of David, Janet, and Anne.

== Sources ==
=== Internet ===
- "Biography, Chester Louis Mize". Kansapedia. Topeka, KS: Kansas Historical Society. June 1, 2011.
- "Biography, Chester Louis Mize Jr". Chester Mize Papers. Topeka, KS: Kansas Historical Society. June 2, 1977.

=== Newspapers ===
- "Obituary, Chester L. Mize". Valley Falls Vindicator. Valley Falls, KS. January 20, 1994 – via Newspapers.com.

U.S. House of Representatives
Preceded by William Henry Avery	Member of the U.S. House of Representatives from Kansas's 2nd congressional district 1965–1971	Succeeded by Bill Roy
