= Justin De Witt Bowersock =

American politician (1842–1922)

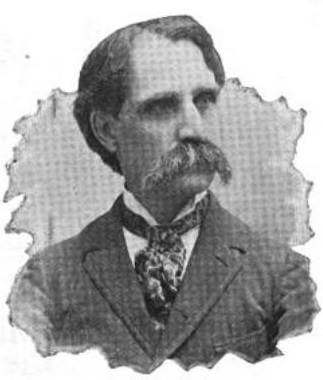

Member of the U.S. House of Representatives from Kansas's 2nd district
- In office March 4, 1899 – March 3, 1907
- Preceded by: Mason S. Peters
- Succeeded by: Charles Frederick Scott

Personal details
- Born: September 19, 1842 Columbiana, Ohio, U.S.
- Died: October 27, 1922 (aged 80) Lawrence, Kansas, U.S.
- Resting place: Oak Hill Cemetery; Lawrence, Kansas, U.S.
- Party: Republican

Justin De Witt Bowersock (September 19, 1842 – October 27, 1922) was a U.S. representative from Kansas.

== Early life ==
Justin De Witt Bowersock was born on September 19, 1842, near Columbiana, Ohio, Bowersock moved to Iowa City, Iowa, in 1860 and engaged in mercantile pursuits and grain shipping. He moved to Lawrence, Kansas, where he engaged in business as a grain merchant. In 1877, he moved to Lawrence, Kansas, where he saw water power possibilities. He built a dam across the Kansas River and established several manufacturing plants with the power thus developed. He was later made president of the Kansas Water Power Company, organized the Douglas County Bank (later the Lawrence National) in 1878, and was elected president in 1888. He was also president of the Bowersock Mills & Power Company, the Kansas Water Power Company, the Griffin Ice Company, the Lawrence Iron Works, the Lawrence Paper Manufacturing Company, and the Kansas & Colorado Railroad Company.

== Government ==
Bowersock was elected as a Republican to the Fifty-sixth and to the three succeeding Congresses (March 4, 1899 – March 3, 1907). He was not a candidate for renomination in 1906. He was interested in banking and manufactures in Lawrence, Kansas, until his death there on October 27, 1922. He was interred in Oak Hill Cemetery in Lawrence.

U.S. House of Representatives
Preceded by Mason S. Peters	Member of the U.S. House of Representatives from Kansas's 2nd congressional district March 4, 1899 – March 3, 1907	Succeeded by Charles F. Scott
