= Orrin L. Miller =

American politician (1856–1926)

Orrin Larrabee Miller
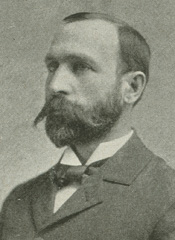

Member of the U.S. House of Representatives from Kansas's 2nd district
- In office March 4, 1895 – March 3, 1897
- Preceded by: Horace Ladd Moore
- Succeeded by: Mason S. Peters

Personal details
- Born: January 11, 1856 Newburgh, Maine, U.S.
- Died: September 11, 1926 (aged 70) Kansas City, Kansas, U.S.
- Party: Republican

Orrin Larrabee Miller (January 11, 1856 – September 11, 1926) was an American politician who served as a member of the United States House of Representatives for Kansas's 2nd congressional district from 1895 to 1897.

== Early life ==
Miller was born in Newburgh, Maine. He attended local common schools and graduated from the Maine Central Institute at Pittsfield, Maine. He studied law and was admitted to the bar in 1880.

== Career ==
Miller began his career in Bangor, Maine, before moving to Kansas City, Kansas, in 1880. He was appointed and subsequently elected district judge for the twenty-ninth judicial district of Kansas in 1887, and served until 1891, when he resigned to resume the practice of law. He served as counsel for many years for several large railroad corporations and was elected as a Republican to the Fifty-fourth Congress (March 4, 1895 – March 3, 1897). Miller declined to be a candidate for renomination in 1896.

== Personal life ==
Miller continued the practice of law in Kansas City, Kansas, until his death there on September 11, 1926. He was buried at Woodlawn Cemetery.

U.S. House of Representatives
Preceded by Horace L. Moore	Member of the U.S. House of Representatives from Kansas's 2nd congressional district March 4, 1895 – March 3, 1897	Succeeded by Mason S. Peters
