= Jim Jeffries (politician) =

American politician

James Edmund Jeffries

Member of the U.S. House of Representatives from Kansas's 2nd district
- In office January 3, 1979 – January 3, 1983
- Preceded by: Martha Keys
- Succeeded by: Jim Slattery

Personal details
- Born: June 1, 1925 Detroit, Michigan, U.S.
- Died: August 22, 1997 (aged 72) Tucson, Arizona, U.S.
- Party: Republican
- Education: Michigan State University

Military service
- Allegiance: United States of America
- Branch/service: United States Army Air Corps
- Years of service: 1943–1945

James Edmund Jeffries (June 1, 1925 – August 22, 1997) was a U.S. representative from Kansas from 1979 to 1983.

Born in Detroit, Michigan, Jeffries attended the public schools. He graduated from Cranbrook School, Bloomfield Hills, Michigan, 1943. He attended Michigan State University, Lansing, 1947. He served in the United States Army Air Corps from 1943 to 1945. and was an investment counselor and corporate director from 1956 to 1979. He served as a delegate to the Kansas State Republican convention, 1978.

Jeffries was elected as a Republican to the Ninety-sixth and to the Ninety-seventh Congresses (January 3, 1979 – January 3, 1983). He was a conservative. He introduced 14 bills during his tenure, the most prominent of which was a 1981 law which settled a long-standing controversy over a minor border dispute between Missouri and Kansas

He was not a candidate for reelection in 1982 to the Ninety-eighth Congress and was a resident of Atchison, Kansas, until he retired to Tucson, Arizona, where he died.

== Notes ==
U.S. House of Representatives
Preceded by Martha Keys	Member of the U.S. House of Representatives from Kansas's 2nd congressional district 1979 - 1983	Succeeded by Jim Slattery
