= Newell A. George =

American politician

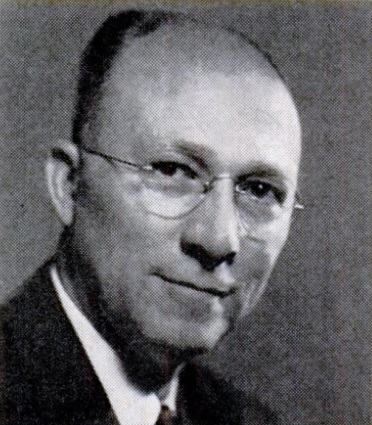

Member of the U.S. House of Representatives from Kansas's 2nd district
- In office January 3, 1959 – January 3, 1961
- Preceded by: Errett P. Scrivner
- Succeeded by: Robert Ellsworth

Personal details
- Born: September 24, 1904 Kansas City, Missouri, U.S.
- Died: October 22, 1992 (aged 88) Kansas City, Kansas, U.S.
- Party: Democratic

Newell Adolphus George (September 24, 1904 – October 22, 1992) was a U.S. representative from Kansas.

Born in Kansas City, Missouri, George attended public schools in Kansas City, Kansas, Wentworth Military Academy in Lexington, Missouri, Park College in Parkville, Missouri, and University of Kansas School of Law. He graduated from the George Washington University, Washington, D.C., in 1935. He was admitted to the District of Columbia bar in 1935 and to the Kansas bar in 1941. He commenced the practice of law in Kansas City, Kansas. He served as member of the staff of United States Senator George McGill of Kansas in 1933 and 1934. Regional attorney, Bureau of Employment Security from 1941 to 1945, and Federal Security Agency 1947-1953. Chief legal counsel, Regional War Manpower Commission, during the Second World War. First assistant Wyandotte County attorney 1953-1958. He served as delegate to the Democratic National Convention in 1960.

George was elected as a Democrat to the Eighty-sixth Congress (January 3, 1959 – January 3, 1961). He was an unsuccessful candidate for reelection in 1960 to the Eighty-seventh Congress. He was appointed United States attorney for the district of Kansas March 28, 1961, and served until June 20, 1968. He was a resident of Kansas City, Kansas, until his death on October 22, 1992.

== Sources ==
- United States Congress. "Newell A. George (id: G000130)". Biographical Directory of the United States Congress.

U.S. House of Representatives
Preceded by Errett P. Scrivner	Member of the U.S. House of Representatives from Kansas's 2nd congressional district 1959–1961	Succeeded by Robert F. Ellsworth
