= Mason S. Peters =

American politician (1844–1914)

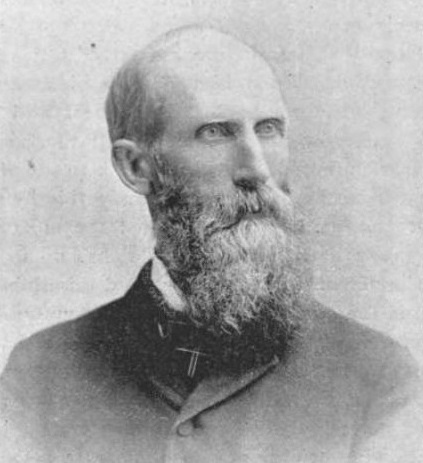

Member of the U.S. House of Representatives from Kansas's 2nd district
- In office March 4, 1897 – March 3, 1899
- Preceded by: Orrin Larrabee Miller
- Succeeded by: Justin De Witt Bowersock

Personal details
- Born: Marcus Summers Peters; September 3, 1844 Clay County, Missouri, U.S.
- Died: February 14, 1914 (aged 69) Kansas City, Missouri, U.S.
- Resting place: Forest Hill Calvary Cemetery; Kansas City, Missouri, U.S.
- Party: Populist

Mason Summers Peters (September 3, 1844 – February 14, 1914) was a U.S. representative from Kansas.

== Early life ==
Marcus Summers Peters was born on September 3, 1844, in Clay County, Missouri near Kearney. He attended the William Jewell College, Liberty, Missouri.

== Career ==
Peters taught in the grammar schools of Clay County, Missouri from 1867 to 1870. He served as clerk of the court of Clinton County, Missouri from 1870 to 1874. He studied law and was admitted to the bar in 1875 and commenced practice in Plattsburg, Missouri. He moved to Wyandotte County, Kansas, in 1886. He organized the Union Live Stock Commission Co. in 1895.

Peters was elected as a Populist to the Fifty-fifth Congress (March 4, 1897 – March 3, 1899). He was unsuccessful in reelection in 1898 to the Fifty-sixth Congress. He resumed his business and professional pursuits in Kansas City, Kansas.

== Personal life ==
Peters died on February 14, 1914, in Kansas City, Missouri. He was interred at Forest Hill Calvary Cemetery in Kansas City.

U.S. House of Representatives
Preceded by Orrin L. Miller	Member of the U.S. House of Representatives from Kansas's 2nd congressional district March 4, 1897 – March 3, 1899	Succeeded by Justin D. Bowersock
