= 1996 United States House of Representatives elections in Kansas =

- November 5, 1996

All 4 Kansas seats to the United States House of Representatives
	Majority party	Minority party
Party	Republican	Democratic
Last election	4	0
Seats won	4	0
Seat change	Steady	Steady
Popular vote	591,146	424,984
Percentage	56.36%	40.52%
Swing	▼7.15%	▲4.03%

Republican
40–50%
50–60%
60–70%
70–80%
80–90%
>90%
Democratic
50–60%
60–70%

The 1996 United States House of Representatives elections in Kansas were held on November 5, 1996, to determine who will represent the state of Kansas in the United States House of Representatives. Kansas has four seats in the House, apportioned according to the 1990 United States census. Representatives are elected for two-year terms.

== Overview ==
United States House of Representatives elections in Kansas, 1996
Party	Votes	Percentage	Seats	+/–
Republican	591,146	56.36%	4	-
Democratic	424,984	40.52%	0	-
Libertarian	23,253	2.22%	0	-
Reform	9,495	0.91%	0	-
Totals	1,048,878	100.00%	4	-
