= 2006 United States House of Representatives elections in Kansas =

- November 7, 2006

All 4 Kansas seats to the United States House of Representatives
	Majority party	Minority party
Party	Republican	Democratic
Last election	3	1
Seats won	2	2
Seat change	▼1	▲1
Popular vote	459,267	369,191
Percentage	54.34%	43.68%
Swing	▼8.25%	▲10.22%

Republican
40–50%
50–60%
60–70%
70–80%
80–90%
>90%
Democratic
40–50%
50–60%
60–70%
80–90%

The 2006 United States House of Representatives elections in Kansas were held on November 7, 2006, to determine who will represent the state of Kansas in the United States House of Representatives. Kansas has four seats in the House, apportioned according to the 2000 United States census. Representatives are elected for two-year terms.

== Overview ==
United States House of Representatives elections in Kansas, 2006
Party	Votes	Percentage	Seats	+/–
Republican	459,267	54.34%	2	-1
Democratic	369,191	43.68%	2	+1
Reform	16,669	1.97%	0	—
Totals	845,127	100.00%	4	—

== District 1 ==
2006 Kansas's 1st congressional district election

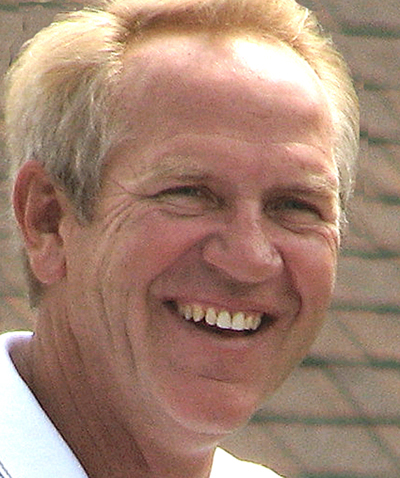
Nominee	Jerry Moran	John Doll
Party	Republican	Democratic
Popular vote	156,728	39,781
Percentage	78.6%	19.9%
U.S. Representative before election
Jerry Moran
Republican
Elected U.S. Representative
Jerry Moran
Republican

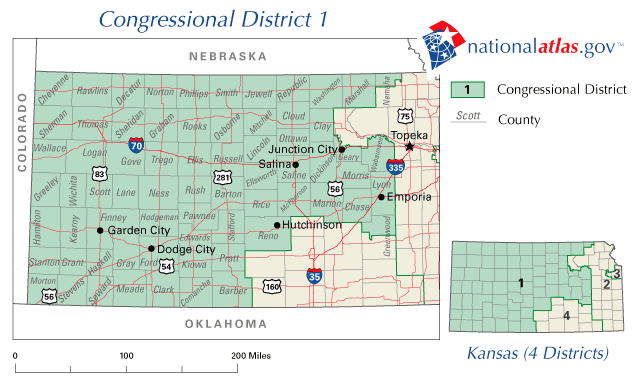

Incumbent Republican Jerry Moran defeated Democrat John Doll, a history professor. This district covers the western part of the state.

=== Predictions ===
Source	Ranking	As of
The Cook Political Report	Safe R	November 6, 2006
Rothenberg	Safe R	November 6, 2006
Sabato's Crystal Ball	Safe R	November 6, 2006
Real Clear Politics	Safe R	November 7, 2006
CQ Politics	Safe R	November 7, 2006

Kansas's 1st congressional district election, 2006
Party	Candidate	Votes	%
Republican	Jerry Moran (incumbent)	156,728	78.61
Democratic	John Doll	39,781	19.95
Reform	Sylvester Cain	2,869	1.44
Total votes		199,378	100.00
Republican hold			

== District 2 ==
2006 Kansas's 2nd congressional district election
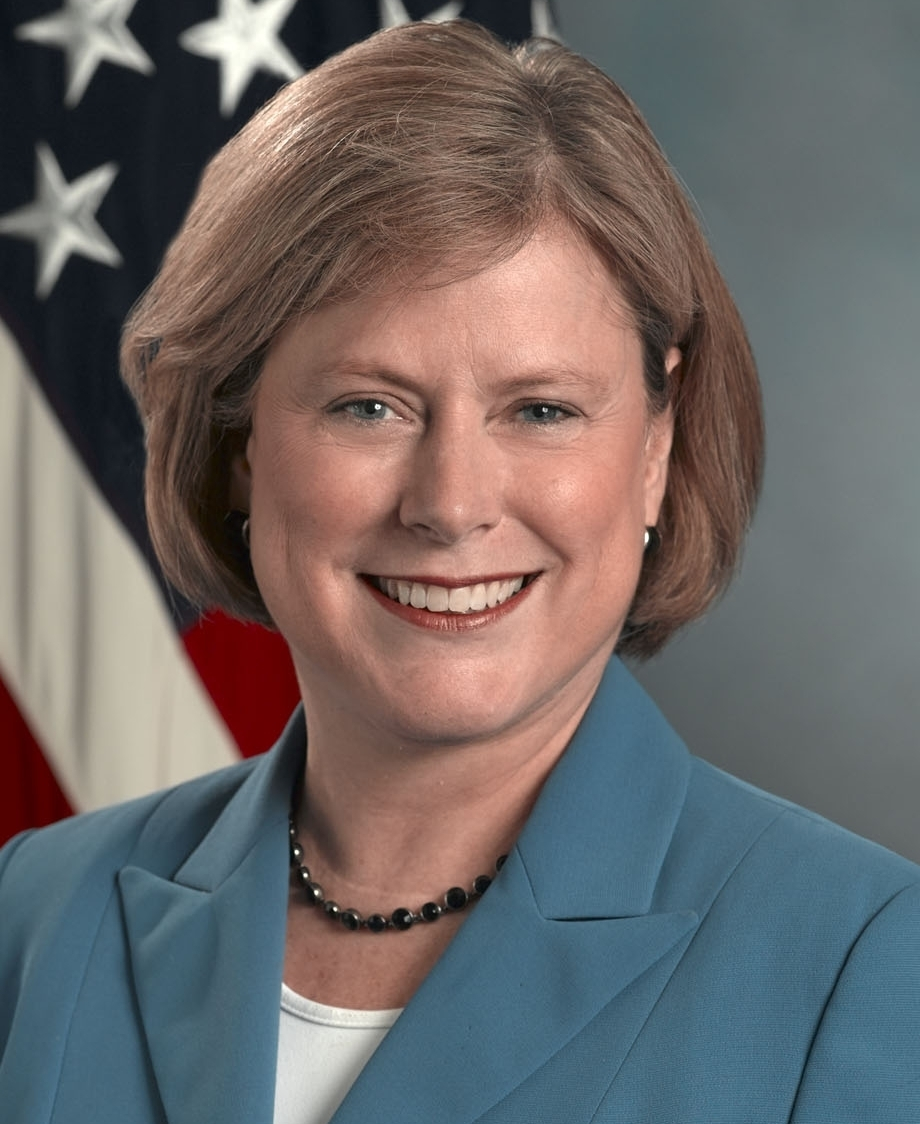

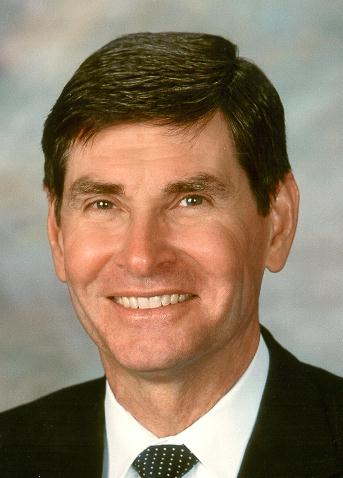
Nominee	Nancy Boyda	Jim Ryun
Party	Democratic	Republican
Popular vote	114,139	106,329
Percentage	50.6%	47.1%
- County results Boyda: 40–50% 50–60% 60–70% Ryun: 40–50% 50–60% 60–70%
U.S. Representative before election
Jim Ryun
Republican
Elected U.S. Representative
Nancy Boyda
Democratic

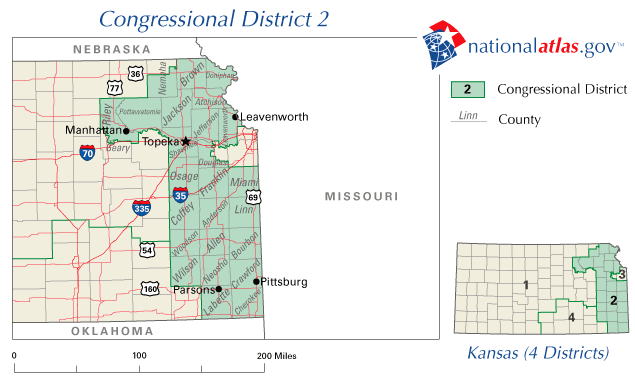

Incumbent Republican Jim Ryun lost re-election to Democrat Nancy Boyda, a chemist. The district covers the eastern part of the state.

=== Predictions ===
Source	Ranking	As of
The Cook Political Report	Tossup	November 6, 2006
Rothenberg	Tossup	November 6, 2006
Sabato's Crystal Ball	Tilt R	November 6, 2006
Real Clear Politics	Safe R	November 7, 2006
CQ Politics	Likely R	November 7, 2006

Kansas's 2nd congressional district election, 2006
Party	Candidate	Votes	%
Democratic	Nancy Boyda	114,139	50.60
Republican	Jim Ryun (incumbent)	106,329	47.14
Reform	Roger D. Tucker	5,094	2.26
Total votes		225,562	100.00
Democratic gain from Republican			

== District 3 ==
2006 Kansas's 3rd congressional district election

Nominee	Dennis Moore	Chuck Ahner
Party	Democratic	Republican
Popular vote	153,105	79,824
Percentage	64.6%	33.7%
U.S. Representative before election
Dennis Moore
Democratic
Elected U.S. Representative
Dennis Moore
Democratic

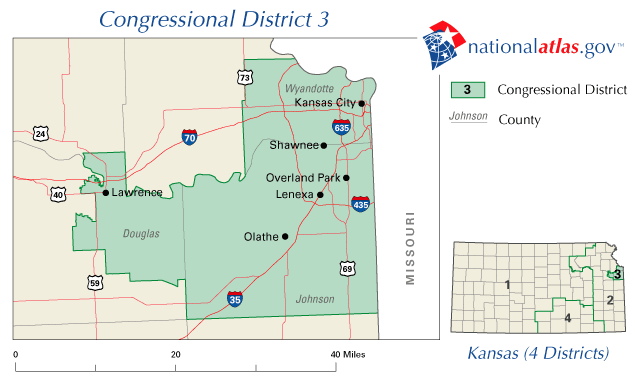

Incumbent Democrat Dennis Moore defeated Republican Chuck Ahner, a businessman. The district covers the Metro Kansas City area.

=== Predictions ===
Source	Ranking	As of
The Cook Political Report	Likely D	November 6, 2006
Rothenberg	Safe D	November 6, 2006
Sabato's Crystal Ball	Safe D	November 6, 2006
Real Clear Politics	Safe D	November 7, 2006
CQ Politics	Likely D	November 7, 2006

Kansas's 3rd congressional district election, 2006
Party	Candidate	Votes	%
Democratic	Dennis Moore (incumbent)	153,105	64.61
Republican	Chuck Ahner	79,824	33.68
Reform	Robert A. Conroy	4,051	1.71
Total votes		236,980	100.00
Democratic hold			

== District 4 ==
2006 Kansas's 4th congressional district election
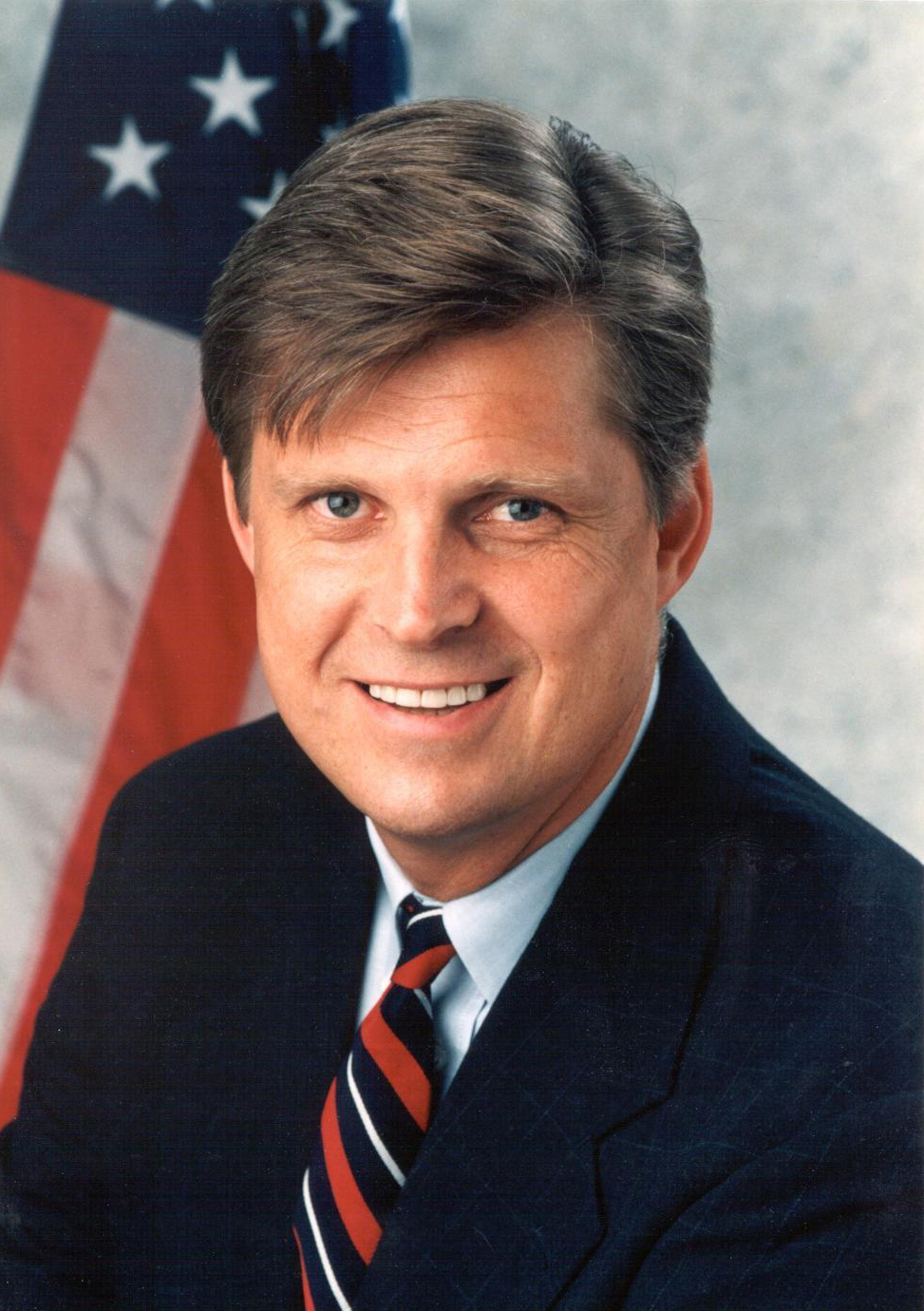

Nominee	Todd Tiahrt	Garth J. McGinn
Party	Republican	Democratic
Popular vote	116,386	62,166
Percentage	63.5%	33.9%
U.S. Representative before election
Todd Tiahrt
Republican
Elected U.S. Representative
Todd Tiahrt
Republican

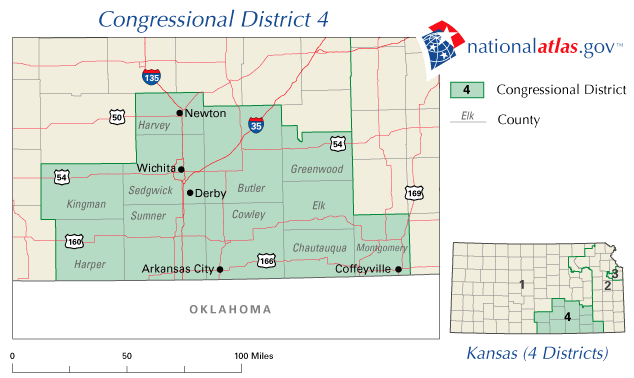

Incumbent Republican Todd Tiahrt defeated Democrat Garth McGinn. This district covers the metro Wichita area.

=== Predictions ===
Source	Ranking	As of
The Cook Political Report	Safe R	November 6, 2006
Rothenberg	Safe R	November 6, 2006
Sabato's Crystal Ball	Safe R	November 6, 2006
Real Clear Politics	Safe R	November 7, 2006
CQ Politics	Safe R	November 7, 2006

Kansas's 4th congressional district election, 2006
Party	Candidate	Votes	%
Republican	Todd Tiahrt (incumbent)	116,386	63.53
Democratic	Garth J. McGinn	62,166	33.93
Reform	Joy R. Holt	4,655	2.54
Total votes		183,207	100.00
Republican hold			
