= 2014 United States House of Representatives election ratings =

Predictions for select races in the 2014 U.S. House elections

- Competitive seats highlighted by party Democratic seats: Competitive Uncompetitive; Republican seats: Competitive Uncompetitive

The 2014 United States House of Representatives elections were held on November 4, 2014, with early voting taking place in some states in the weeks preceding that date. Voters chose representatives from all 435 congressional districts across each of the 50 U.S. states. Non-voting delegates from the District of Columbia and four of the five inhabited U.S. territories (Note: Not including the Resident Commissioner of Puerto Rico, who serves a four-year term.) were also elected. These midterm elections took place nearly halfway through the second term of Democratic President Barack Obama. The winners served in the 114th United States Congress, with seats apportioned among the states based on the 2010 United States census. On Election Day, Republicans had held a House majority since January 2011 as a result of the 2010 elections.

== Election ratings ==
Several sites and individuals publish ratings of competitive seats. The seats listed below were considered competitive (not "safe" or "solid") by at least one of the rating groups. These ratings are based upon factors such as the strength of the incumbent (if the incumbent is running for re-election), the strength of the candidates, and the partisan history of the district (the Cook Partisan Voting Index is one example of this metric). Each rating describes the likelihood of a given outcome in the election.

Incumbents not running for re-election have parentheses around their names, while incumbents with a caret (^) sought re-election, but were defeated in the primary election. Note that safeness of a district is not necessarily a prediction as to outcome.

Most election ratings use:

- Tossup: no advantage
- Tilt (sometimes used): slight advantage
- Lean: clear advantage
- Likely: strong, but not certain advantage
- Safe: outcome is nearly certain

District	CPVI	Incumbent	Previous result	Cook November 3, 2014	Rothenberg October 29, 2014	Sabato October 30, 2014	RCP November 2, 2014	Daily Kos November 4, 2014	Winner
Alaska at-large	R+12	Don Young (R)	63.9% R	Safe R	Safe R	Likely R	Likely R	Likely R	Don Young (R)
Arizona 1	R+4	Ann Kirkpatrick (D)	48.8% D	Tossup	Tossup	Lean R (flip)	Tossup	Tossup	Ann Kirkpatrick (D)
Arizona 2	R+3	Ron Barber (D)	50.4% D	Tossup	Tossup	Lean D	Tossup	Tossup	Martha McSally (R)
Arizona 9	R+1	Kyrsten Sinema (D)	48.5% D	Lean D	Likely D	Likely D	Likely D	Lean D	Kyrsten Sinema (D)
Arkansas 2	R+8	Timothy Griffin (R) (retiring) (Note: Retired to run for Lieutenant Governor)	55.2% R	Tossup	Tilt R	Lean R	Tossup	Tossup	French Hill (R)
Arkansas 4	R+15	Tom Cotton (R) (retiring) (Note: Retired to run for senate)	59.5% R	Lean R	Likely R	Lean R	Tossup	Lean R	Bruce Westerman (R)
California 3	D+3	John Garamendi (D)	53.7% D	Likely D	Safe D	Safe D	Likely D	Likely D	John Garamendi (D)
California 7	EVEN	Ami Bera (D)	51.1% D	Tossup	Tossup	Lean R (flip)	Tossup	Tossup	Ami Bera (D)
California 9	D+6	Jerry McNerney (D)	54.1% D	Safe D	Safe D	Safe D	Likely D	Safe D	Jerry McNerney (D)
California 21	D+2	David Valadao (R)	59.9% R	Lean R	Likely R	Likely R	Lean R	Lean R	David Valadao (R)
California 24	D+4	Lois Capps (D)	54.8% D	Likely D	Likely D	Likely D	Likely D	Likely D	Lois Capps (D)
California 26	D+4	Julia Brownley (D)	51.7% D	Tossup	Lean D	Lean D	Tossup	Tossup	Julia Brownley (D)
California 31	D+5	Gary Miller (R) (retiring)	55.2% R	Lean D (flip)	Lean D (flip)	Lean D (flip)	Lean D (flip)	Lean D (flip)	Pete Aguilar (D)
California 36	R+1	Raul Ruiz (D)	51.4% D	Lean D	Safe D	Lean D	Lean D	Lean D	Raul Ruiz (D)
California 52	D+2	Scott Peters (D)	50.2% D	Tossup	Tossup	Lean D	Tossup	Tossup	Scott Peters (D)
Colorado 6	D+1	Mike Coffman (R)	48.7% R	Lean R	Tilt R	Lean R	Tossup	Tilt R	Mike Coffman (R)
Connecticut 5	D+3	Elizabeth Esty (D)	51.5% D	Likely D	Safe D	Likely D	Likely D	Likely D	Elizabeth Esty (D)
Florida 2	R+6	Steve Southerland (R)	52.7% R	Tossup	Tossup	Lean D (flip)	Tossup	Tossup	Gwen Graham (D)
Florida 18	R+3	Patrick Murphy (D)	50.3% D	Likely D	Safe D	Likely D	Lean D	Lean D	Patrick Murphy (D)
Florida 26	R+1	Joe Garcia (D)	53.6% D	Tossup	Tilt R (flip)	Lean R (flip)	Tossup	Tossup	Carlos Curbelo (R)
Georgia 12	R+9	John Barrow (D)	53.7% D	Tossup	Lean D	Lean D	Tossup	Tossup	Rick Allen (R)
Hawaii 1	D+18	Colleen Hanabusa (D) (retiring)	54.6% D	Lean D	Lean D	Lean D	Tossup	Lean D	Mark Takai (D)
Illinois 8	D+8	Tammy Duckworth (D)	54.7% D	Likely D	Safe D	Safe D	Safe D	Safe D	Tammy Duckworth (D)
Illinois 10	D+8	Brad Schneider (D)	50.5% D	Tossup	Tossup	Lean R (flip)	Tossup	Tossup	Robert Dold (R)
Illinois 11	D+8	Bill Foster (D)	58.1% D	Likely D	Safe D	Likely D	Lean D	Likely D	Bill Foster (D)
Illinois 12	EVEN	Bill Enyart (D)	51.5% D	Tossup	Tilt R (flip)	Lean R (flip)	Tossup	Tossup	Mike Bost (R)
Illinois 13	EVEN	Rodney Davis (R)	46.6% R	Likely R	Safe R	Likely R	Lean R	Likely R	Rodney Davis (R)
Illinois 17	D+7	Cheri Bustos (D)	53.3% D	Lean D	Likely D	Likely D	Lean D	Lean D	Cheri Bustos (D)
Indiana 2	R+6	Jackie Walorski (R)	49.0% R	Safe R	Safe R	Likely R	Likely R	Safe R	Jackie Walorski (R)
Iowa 1	D+5	Bruce Braley (D) (retiring)	56.9% D	Tossup	Tossup	Lean D	Tossup	Tossup	Rod Blum (R)
Iowa 2	D+4	Dave Loebsack (D)	55.6% D	Lean D	Lean D	Lean D	Lean D	Lean D	Dave Loebsack (D)
Iowa 3	EVEN	Tom Latham (R) (retiring)	52.3% R	Tossup	Tossup	Lean R	Tossup	Tossup	David Young (R)
Iowa 4	R+5	Steve King (R)	53.2% R	Safe R	Safe R	Safe R	Likely R	Likely R	Steve King (R)
Kansas 2	R+8	Lynn Jenkins (R)	57.0% R	Likely R	Safe R	Likely R	Likely R	Likely R	Lynn Jenkins (R)
Kansas 3	R+6	Kevin Yoder (R)	68.4% R	Likely R	Safe R	Likely R	Likely R	Safe R	Kevin Yoder (R)
Maine 2	D+2	Mike Michaud (D) (retiring) (Note: Retired to run for Governor)	58.1% D	Lean D	Lean D	Lean D	Tossup	Lean D	Bruce Poliquin (R)
Maryland 6	D+4	John Delaney (D)	58.8% D	Likely D	Safe D	Safe D	Likely D	Likely D	John Delaney (D)
Massachusetts 6	D+4	John F. Tierney (D) (lost renomination)	48.3% D	Lean D	Tilt D	Lean D	Lean D	Tilt D	Seth Moulton (D)
Massachusetts 9	D+5	Bill Keating (D)	58.3% D	Likely D	Likely D	Likely D	Lean D	Likely D	Bill Keating (D)
Michigan 1	R+5	Dan Benishek (R)	48.2% R	Likely R	Likely R	Likely R	Lean R	Lean R	Dan Benishek (R)
Michigan 4	R+5	Dave Camp (R) (retiring)	63.1% R	Safe R	Safe R	Safe R	Likely R	Safe R	John Moolenaar (R)
Michigan 6	R+1	Fred Upton (R)	54.6% R	Likely R	Safe R	Safe R	Safe R	Likely R	Fred Upton (R)
Michigan 7	R+3	Tim Walberg (R)	53.3% R	Safe R	Safe R	Likely R	Likely R	Likely R	Tim Walberg (R)
Michigan 8	R+2	Mike Rogers (R) (retiring)	58.6% R	Safe R	Safe R	Likely R	Likely R	Likely R	Mike Bishop (R)
Michigan 11	R+4	Kerry Bentivolio (R) (lost renomination) (Note: Ran as a Write-In in the General Election)	50.7% R	Likely R	Safe R	Safe R	Safe R	Likely R	Dave Trott
Minnesota 1	R+1	Tim Walz (D)	57.6% D	Likely D	Safe D	Safe D	Safe D	Safe D	Tim Walz (D)
Minnesota 7	R+6	Collin Peterson (D)	60.4% D	Lean D	Lean D	Lean D	Lean D	Tossup	Collin Peterson (D)
Minnesota 8	D+1	Rick Nolan (D)	54.5% D	Tossup	Tossup	Lean R (flip)	Tossup	Tossup	Rick Nolan (D)
Montana at-large	R+7	Steve Daines (R) (retiring)	53.2% R	Likely R	Safe R	Likely R	Likely R	Safe R	Ryan Zinke (R)
Nebraska 2	R+4	Lee Terry (R)	51.2% R	Tossup	Tilt D (flip)	Lean D (flip)	Tossup	Tilt D (flip)	Brad Ashford (D)
Nevada 3	EVEN	Joe Heck (R)	50.4% R	Likely R	Safe R	Safe R	Likely R	Safe R	Joe Heck (R)
Nevada 4	D+4	Steven Horsford (D)	50.1% D	Lean D	Likely D	Lean D	Lean D	Tilt D	Cresent Hardy (R)
New Hampshire 1	R+1	Carol Shea-Porter (D)	49.7% D	Tossup	Tilt D	Lean R (flip)	Tossup	Tossup	Frank Guinta (R)
New Hampshire 2	D+3	Ann McLane Kuster (D)	50.2% D	Lean D	Lean D	Lean D	Tossup	Lean D	Ann McLane Kuster (D)
New Jersey 3	R+1	Jon Runyan (R) (retiring)	53.8% R	Lean R	Lean R	Lean R	Lean R	Lean R	Tom MacArthur (R)
New Jersey 5	R+4	Scott Garrett (R)	55.5% R	Likely R	Safe R	Safe R	Likely R	Safe R	Scott Garrett (R)
New York 1	R+2	Tim Bishop (D)	52.2% D	Tossup	Tossup	Lean R (flip)	Tossup	Tossup	Lee Zeldin (R)
New York 4	D+3	Carolyn McCarthy (D) (retiring)	61.8% D	Likely D	Safe D	Safe D	Likely D	Likely D	Kathleen Rice (D)
New York 11	R+2	Michael Grimm (R)	52.8% R	Lean R	Tilt R	Lean R	Tossup	Lean R	Michael Grimm (R)
New York 18	EVEN	Sean Patrick Maloney (D)	51.7% D	Tossup	Tilt D	Lean D	Lean D	Lean D	Sean Patrick Maloney (D)
New York 19	D+1	Chris Gibson (R)	53.4% R	Likely R	Safe R	Likely R	Likely R	Likely R	Chris Gibson (R)
New York 21	EVEN	Bill Owens (D) (retiring)	50.2% D	Likely R (flip)	Safe R (flip)	Likely R (flip)	Lean R (flip)	Likely R (flip)	Elise Stefanik (R)
New York 23	R+3	Tom Reed (R)	52.1% R	Safe R	Safe R	Likely R	Likely R	Likely R	Tom Reed (R)
New York 24	D+5	Dan Maffei (D)	48.4% D	Tossup	Tilt D	Lean D	Tossup	Tossup	John Katko (R)
North Carolina 7	R+12	Mike McIntyre (D) (retiring)	50.1% D	Likely R (flip)	Safe R (flip)	Safe R (flip)	Safe R (flip)	Safe R (flip)	David Rouzer (R)
North Dakota at-large	R+10	Kevin Cramer (R)	54.9% R	Likely R	Safe R	Likely R	Safe R	Likely R	Kevin Cramer (R)
Ohio 6	R+8	Bill Johnson (R)	53.3% R	Safe R	Safe R	Safe R	Likely R	Safe R	Bill Johnson (R)
Ohio 14	R+4	David Joyce (R)	54.3% R	Safe R	Safe R	Safe R	Likely R	Safe R	David Joyce (R)
Pennsylvania 6	R+2	Jim Gerlach (R) (retiring)	57.1% R	Likely R	Likely R	Safe R	Likely R	Safe R	Ryan Costello (R)
Texas 23	R+3	Pete Gallego (D)	50.3% D	Lean D	Lean D	Lean D	Lean D	Lean D	Will Hurd (R)
Utah 4	R+16	Jim Matheson (D) (retiring)	49.3% D	Likely R (flip)	Safe R (flip)	Likely R (flip)	Safe R (flip)	Likely R (flip)	Mia Love (R)
Virginia 10	R+2	Frank Wolf (R) (retiring)	58.8% R	Lean R	Lean R	Lean R	Tossup	Lean R	Barbara Comstock (R)
Washington 1	D+4	Suzan DelBene (D)	53.6% D	Likely D	Safe D	Safe D	Likely D	Safe D	Suzan DelBene (D)
West Virginia 2	R+11	Shelley Moore Capito (R) (retiring)	69.8% R	Tossup	Tilt R	Lean R	Tossup	Lean R	Alex Mooney (R)
West Virginia 3	R+14	Nick Rahall (D)	53.9% D	Tossup	Tossup	Lean R (flip)	Tossup	Tilt R (flip)	Evan Jenkins (R)
Wisconsin 6	R+5	Tom Petri (R) (retiring)	62.1% R	Likely R	Safe R	Safe R	Likely R	Likely R	Glenn Grothman (R)
Wisconsin 7	R+2	Sean Duffy (R)	56.1% R	Safe R	Safe R	Safe R	Likely R	Safe R	Sean Duffy (R)
Overall				R - 228; D - 182; 25 tossups	R - 235; D - 189; 11 tossups	R - 243; D - 192	R - 226; D - 179; 30 tossups	R - 227; D -190; 18 tossups	R - 247; D - 188
