= 2016 United States House of Representatives elections in Kansas =

- November 8, 2016

All 4 Kansas seats to the United States House of Representatives
	Majority party	Minority party
Party	Republican	Democratic
Last election	4	0
Seats won	4	0
Seat change	Steady	Steady
Popular vote	694,240	317,635
Percentage	59.15%	27.06%
Swing	▼3.58%	▼9.08%
	Third party	Fourth party
Party	Independent	Libertarian
Last election	0	0
Seats won	0	0
Seat change	Steady	Steady
Popular vote	86,790	74,227
Percentage	7.39%	6.32%
Swing	New	▲5.18%

Republican
50–60%
60–70%
70–80%
80–90%
Democratic
50–60%
Independent
60–70%

The 2016 United States House of Representatives elections in Kansas were held on November 8, 2016, to elect the four U.S. representatives from the state of Kansas, one from each of the state's four congressional districts. The elections coincided with the 2016 U.S. presidential election, as well as other elections to the House of Representatives, elections to the United States Senate and various state and local elections. The primaries were held on August 2.

== Overview ==
Party	Votes	Percentage	Seats before	Seats after	+/–
Republican	694,240	59.15%	4	4	Steady
Democratic	317,635	27.06%	0	0	Steady
Independents	86,790	7.39%	0	0	Steady
Libertarian	74,227	6.32%	0	0	Steady
Write-ins	874	0.07%	0	0	Steady
Totals	1,173,736	100.00%	4	4	0

Popular vote
Republican	59.15%
Democratic	27.06%
Libertarian	6.32%

House seats
Republican	100.00%

== District 1 ==
2016 Kansas's 1st congressional district election
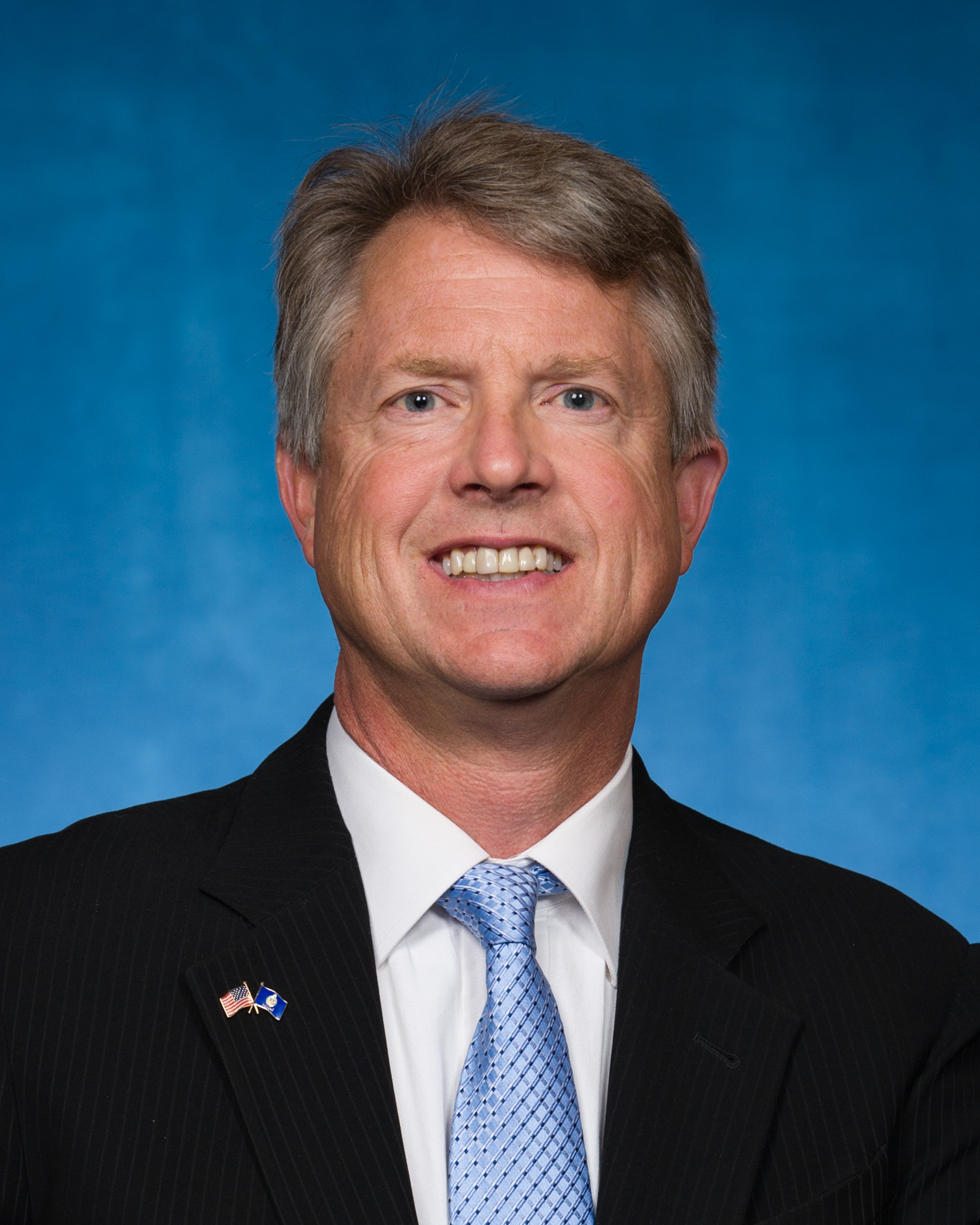

Nominee	Roger Marshall	Alan LaPolice	Kerry Burt
Party	Republican	Independent	Libertarian
Popular vote	169,992	67,739	19,366
Percentage	65.9%	26.3%	7.5%
- County results Marshall: 50–60% 60–70% 70–80% 80–90% LaPolice: 60–70%
U.S. Representative before election
Tim Huelskamp
Republican
Elected U.S. Representative
Roger Marshall
Republican

Incumbent Republican Tim Huelskamp defeated a little-known opponent, former school administrator Alan LaPolice, in the Republican primary election by a closer than expected margin of 55% to 45% in the 2014 elections. Because of this, his poor relationship with House Republican leadership and his support for cutting farm subsidies, which cost him the support of the Kansas Farm Bureau and Kansas Livestock Association in 2014, he was thought to be vulnerable to a primary challenge. In the primary election on August 2, 2016, Huelskamp was defeated 57%-43%.

=== Republican primary ===
==== Candidates ====
===== Nominee =====
- Roger Marshall, obstetrician

===== Eliminated in primary =====
- Tim Huelskamp, incumbent U.S. Representative

===== Declined =====
- Garrett Love, state senator

==== Polling ====
Poll source	Date(s) administered	Sample size	Margin of error	Tim Huelskamp	Roger Marshall	Other	Undecided
Fort Hays State University	July 11–22, 2016	176	± 6.76%	40%	41%	3%	15%
Clout Research (R)	July 7–9, 2016	615	± 3.9%	42%	49%	—	9%

==== Results ====
2016 Republican primary results by county Marshall: 50–60%; 60–70%; Huelskamp: 50–60%; 60–70%

Republican primary results
Party	Candidate	Votes	%
Republican	Roger Marshall	59,889	56.6
Republican	Tim Huelskamp (incumbent)	45,997	43.4
Total votes		105,886	100.0

=== Libertarian ===
==== Nominee ====
- Kerry Burt

==== Independent ====
Declared

- Alan LaPolice, former school administrator and Republican candidate for this seat in 2014

=== General election ===
==== Predictions ====
Source	Ranking	As of
The Cook Political Report	Safe R	November 7, 2016
Daily Kos Elections	Safe R	November 7, 2016
Rothenberg	Safe R	November 3, 2016
Sabato's Crystal Ball	Safe R	November 7, 2016
RCP	Safe R	October 31, 2016

==== Results ====
Kansas's 1st congressional district, 2016
Party	Candidate	Votes	%
Republican	Roger Marshall	169,992	65.9
Independent	Alan LaPolice	67,739	26.3
Libertarian	Kerry Burt	19,366	7.5
Write-in	Tim Huelskamp (incumbent)	874	0.3
Total votes		257,971	100.0
Republican hold			

== District 2 ==
2016 Kansas's 2nd congressional district election
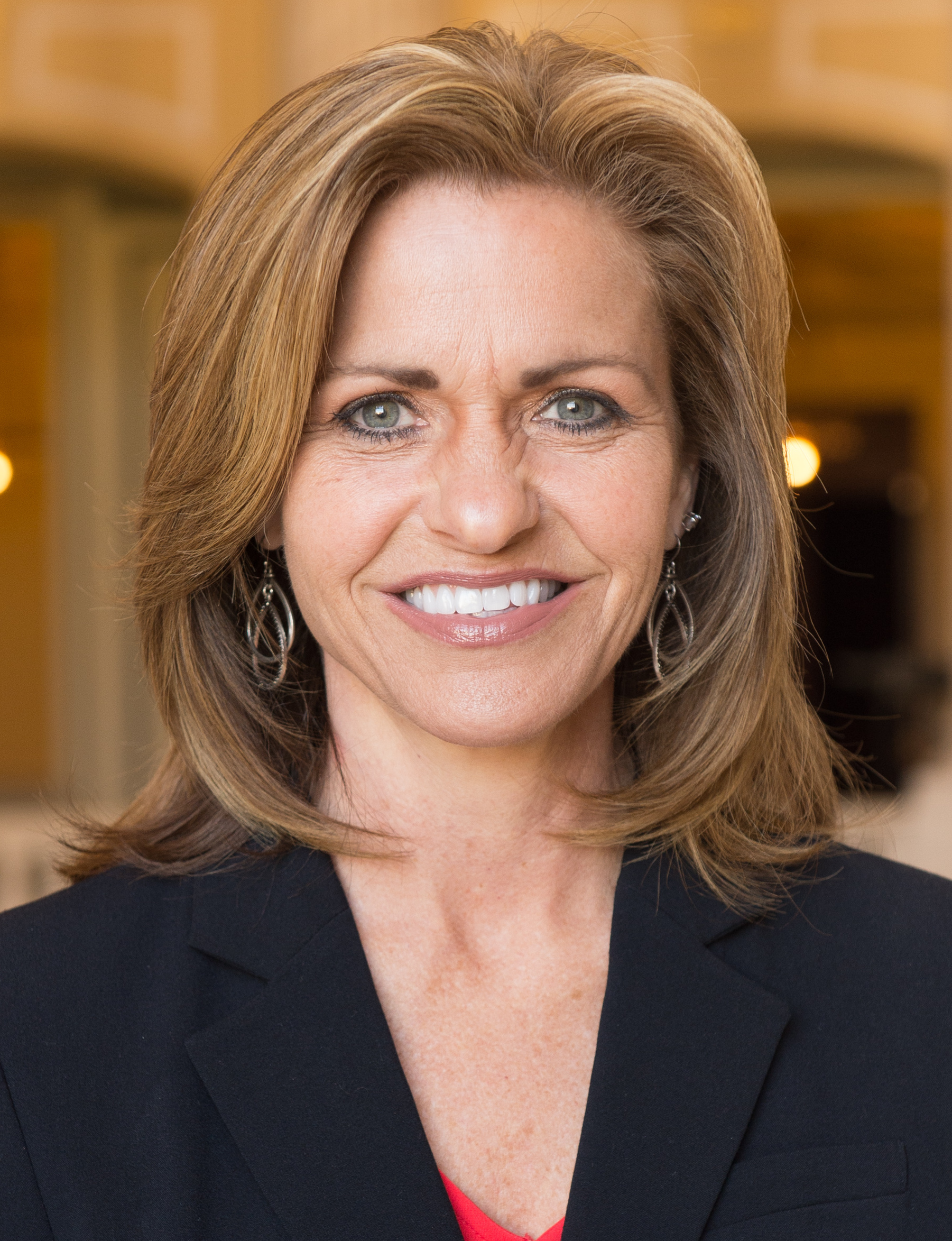

Nominee	Lynn Jenkins	Britani Potter	James Houston Bales
Party	Republican	Democratic	Libertarian
Popular vote	181,228	96,840	19,333
Percentage	60.9%	32.6%	6.5%
- County results Jenkins: 50–60% 60–70% 70–80% 80–90% Potter: 50–60%
U.S. Representative before election
Lynn Jenkins
Republican
Elected U.S. Representative
Lynn Jenkins
Republican

=== Republican primary ===
==== Candidates ====
===== Nominee =====
- Lynn Jenkins, incumbent U.S. Representative

==== Results ====
Republican primary results
Party	Candidate	Votes	%
Republican	Lynn Jenkins (incumbent)	54,958	100.0
Total votes		54,958	100.0

=== Democratic primary ===
==== Candidates ====
===== Nominee =====
- Britani Potter, financial consultant and Ottawa School Board Member

===== Withdrawn =====
- James Pryor

==== Results ====
Democratic primary results
Party	Candidate	Votes	%
Democratic	Britani Potter	24,383	100.0
Total votes		24,383	100.0

=== Libertarian ===
==== Nominee ====
- James Houston Bales

=== General election ===
==== Endorsements ====
Britani Potter (D)

Individuals

- Barry Grissom, former United States Attorney for the District of Kansas

==== Predictions ====
Source	Ranking	As of
The Cook Political Report	Safe R	November 7, 2016
Daily Kos Elections	Safe R	November 7, 2016
Rothenberg	Safe R	November 3, 2016
Sabato's Crystal Ball	Safe R	November 7, 2016
RCP	Safe R	October 31, 2016

==== Results ====
Kansas's 2nd congressional district, 2016
Party	Candidate	Votes	%
Republican	Lynn Jenkins (incumbent)	181,228	60.9
Democratic	Britani Potter	96,840	32.6
Libertarian	James Houston Bales	19,333	6.5
Total votes		297,401	100.0
Republican hold			

== District 3 ==
2016 Kansas's 3rd congressional district election
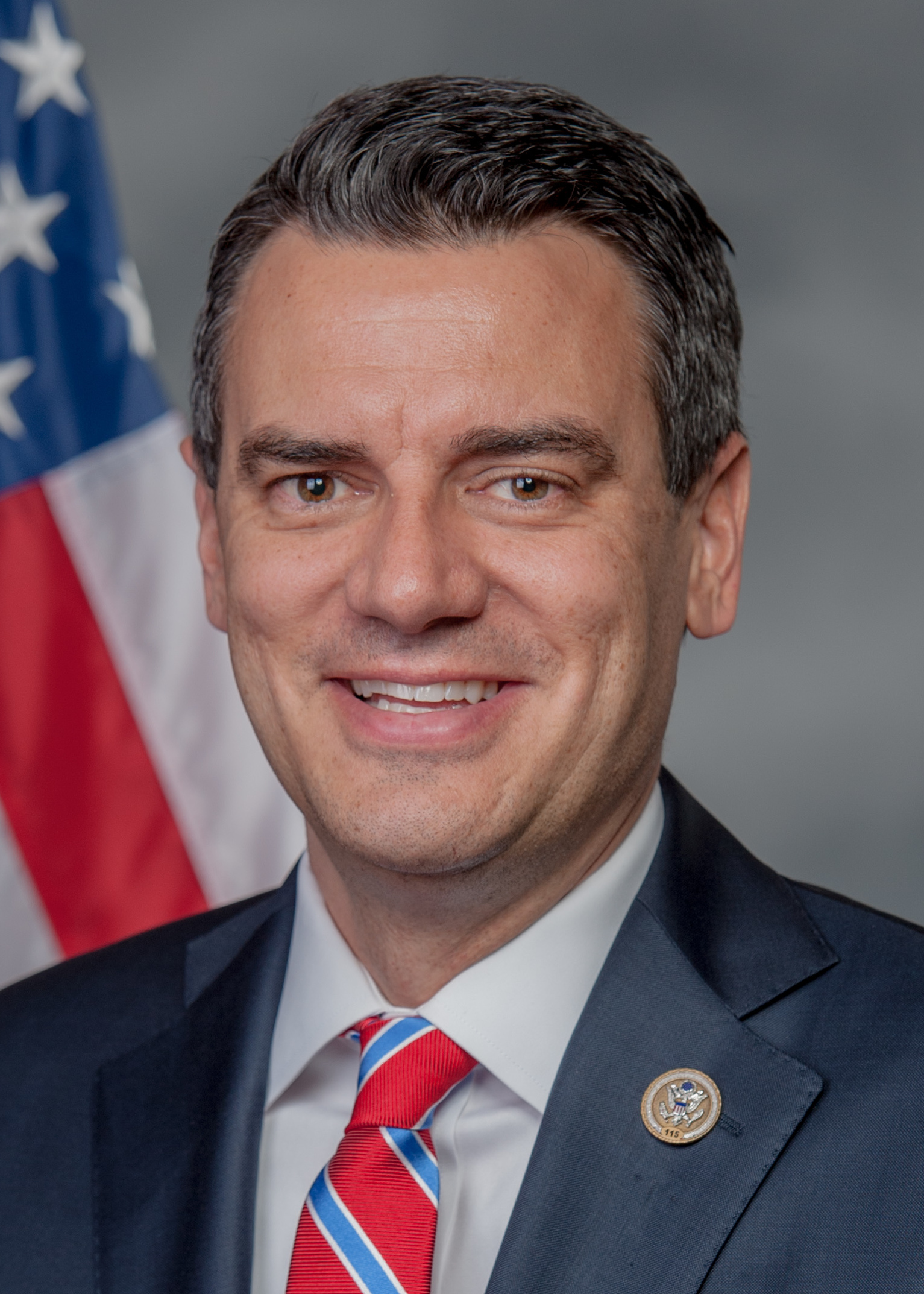

Nominee	Kevin Yoder	Jay Sidie	Steve Hohe
Party	Republican	Democratic	Libertarian
Popular vote	176,022	139,300	27,791
Percentage	51.3%	40.6%	8.1%
- County results Yoder: 50–60% 60–70% Sidie: 50–60%
U.S. Representative before election
Kevin Yoder
Republican
Elected U.S. Representative
Kevin Yoder
Republican

Incumbent Republican Kevin Yoder faced a primary challenge from retired U.S. Army officer Greg Goode, who ran strongly to the right; Yoder easily won.

As of June 2016, Yoder had raised far more money in campaign contributions than either his Republican primary opponent or his Democratic rival.

=== Republican primary ===
==== Candidates ====
===== Nominee =====
- Kevin Yoder, incumbent U.S. Representative

===== Eliminated in primary =====
- Greg Goode, retired U.S. Army lieutenant colonel

===== Declined =====
- Milton R. Wolf, physician and candidate for Senate in 2014.

==== Results ====
Election results were as follows:

Republican primary results
Party	Candidate	Votes	%
Republican	Kevin Yoder (incumbent)	37,681	63.6
Republican	Greg Goode	21,563	36.4
Total votes		59,244	100.0

=== Democratic primary ===
Three candidates ran in the Democratic primary. Businessman Jay Sidie of Mission Woods won a three-way Democratic primary.

==== Candidates ====
===== Nominee =====
- Jay Sidie, financial counselor

===== Eliminated in primary =====
- Nathaniel McLaughlin president of the Kansas NAACP
- Reggie Marselus, retired union official

==== Results ====
Election results were as follows:

Democratic primary results
Party	Candidate	Votes	%
Democratic	Jay Sidie	13,879	41.5
Democratic	Nathaniel McLaughlin	12,105	36.2
Democratic	Reggie Marselus	7,435	22.3
Total votes		33,419	100.0

=== Libertarian ===
==== Candidates ====
===== Nominee =====
- Steve Hohe

=== General election ===
==== Predictions ====
Source	Ranking	As of
The Cook Political Report	Lean R	November 7, 2016
Daily Kos Elections	Lean R	November 7, 2016
Rothenberg	Lean R	November 3, 2016
Sabato's Crystal Ball	Lean R	November 7, 2016
RCP	Lean R	October 31, 2016

==== Results ====
Kansas's 3rd congressional district, 2016
Party	Candidate	Votes	%
Republican	Kevin Yoder (incumbent)	176,022	51.3
Democratic	Jay Sidie	139,300	40.6
Libertarian	Steve Hohe	27,791	8.1
Total votes		343,113	100.0
Republican hold			

== District 4 ==
2016 Kansas's 4th congressional district election
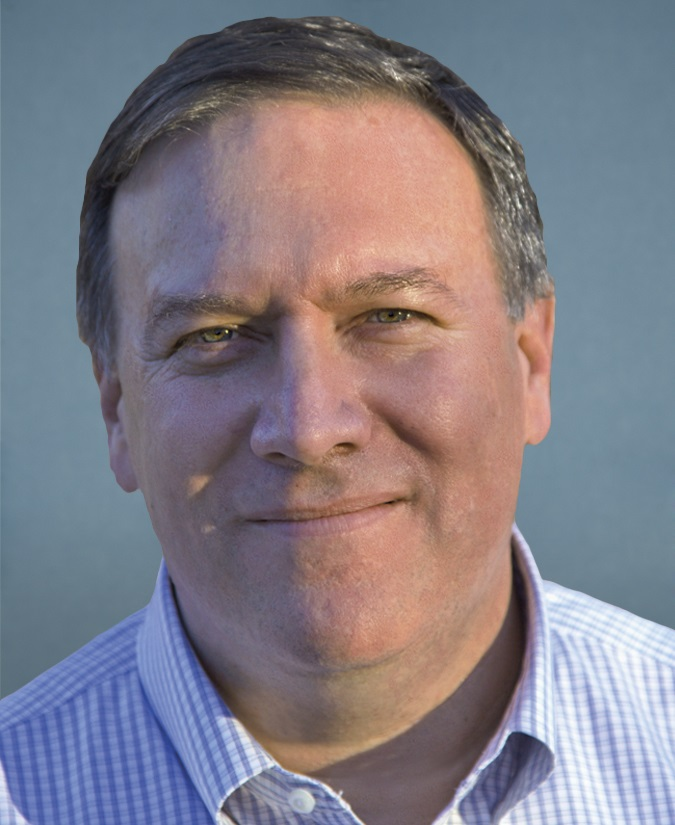

Nominee	Mike Pompeo	Daniel Giroux	Miranda Allen
Party	Republican	Democratic	Independent
Popular vote	166,998	81,495	19,021
Percentage	60.7%	29.6%	6.9%
- County results Pompeo: 50–60% 60–70% 70–80% 80–90%
U.S. Representative before election
Mike Pompeo
Republican
Elected U.S. Representative
Mike Pompeo
Republican

=== Republican primary ===
==== Candidates ====
===== Nominee =====
- Mike Pompeo, incumbent U.S. Representative

==== Results ====
Republican primary results
Party	Candidate	Votes	%
Republican	Mike Pompeo (incumbent)	56,808	100.0
Total votes		56,808	100.0

=== Democratic primary ===
==== Candidates ====
===== Nominee =====
- Daniel B. Giroux, attorney and small business owner

===== Eliminated in primary =====
- Robert Tillman, retired court officer, Kansas National Guard veteran, candidate for this seat in 2010 and nominee in 2012

==== Results ====
Democratic primary results
Party	Candidate	Votes	%
Democratic	Daniel B. Giroux	9,489	51.5
Democratic	Robert Leon Tillman	8,936	48.5
Total votes		18,425	100.0

=== Libertarian ===
==== Nominee ====
- Gordon Bakken

=== Independent ===
Declared

- Miranda Allen

=== General election ===
==== Endorsements ====
Daniel B. Giroux (D)

Labor unions

- AFL-CIO

Newspapers

- The Wichita Eagle

==== Predictions ====
Source	Ranking	As of
The Cook Political Report	Safe R	November 7, 2016
Daily Kos Elections	Safe R	November 7, 2016
Rothenberg	Safe R	November 3, 2016
Sabato's Crystal Ball	Safe R	November 7, 2016
RCP	Safe R	October 31, 2016

==== Results ====
Kansas's 4th congressional district, 2016
Party	Candidate	Votes	%
Republican	Mike Pompeo (incumbent)	166,998	60.7
Democratic	Daniel B. Giroux	81,495	29.6
Independent	Miranda Allen	19,021	6.9
Libertarian	Gordon Bakken	7,737	2.8
Total votes		275,251	100.0
Republican hold			
