= 2012 United States House of Representatives elections in Kansas =

- November 6, 2012

All 4 Kansas seats to the United States House of Representatives
	Majority party	Minority party	Third party
Party	Republican	Democratic	Libertarian
Last election	4	0	0
Seats won	4	0	0
Seat change	Steady	Steady	Steady
Popular vote	740,981	195,505	121,253
Percentage	70.05%	18.48%	11.46%
Swing	▲6.84%	▼14.43%	▲8.18%

Republican
50–60%
60–70%
70–80%
80–90%
90–100%
Democratic
40–50%
50–60%

The 2012 United States House of Representatives elections in Kansas were held on Tuesday, November 6, 2012, to elect the four U.S. representatives from the state of Kansas. The elections coincided with the elections of other federal and state offices, including a quadrennial presidential election.

== Overview ==
United States House of Representatives elections in Kansas, 2012
Party	Votes	Percentage	Seats	+/–
Republican	740,981	70.05%	4	-
Democratic	195,505	18.48%	0	-
Libertarian	121,253	11.46%	0	-
Totals	1,057,739	100.00%	4	—

== Redistricting ==
The 2010 United States census reflected a shift of population "primarily from rural western and northern Kansas to urban and suburban areas in the eastern part of the state."

In spite of Republican political control of the governor's office, the state senate, the state house, and the entire U.S. congressional delegation, redistricting had to be decided by a federal court. To decide the case, a three-judge panel was appointed by Mary Beck Briscoe, the chief judge of the Court of Appeals for the 10th Circuit: Briscoe appointed herself, along with two judges from the District Court for Kansas: Chief District Judge Kathryn Hoefer Vratil, and District Judge John Watson Lungstrum.

According to the Court:

While legislators publicly demurred that they had done the best they could, the impasse resulted from a bitter ideological feud—largely over new Senate districts. The feud primarily pitted GOP moderates against their more conservative GOP colleagues. Failing consensus, the process degenerated into blatant efforts to gerrymander various districts for ideological political advantage and to serve the political ambitions of various legislators.

Once redistricting was finalized in federal court, primary elections were held on August 7, 2012.

== District 1 ==
2012 Kansas's 1st congressional district election
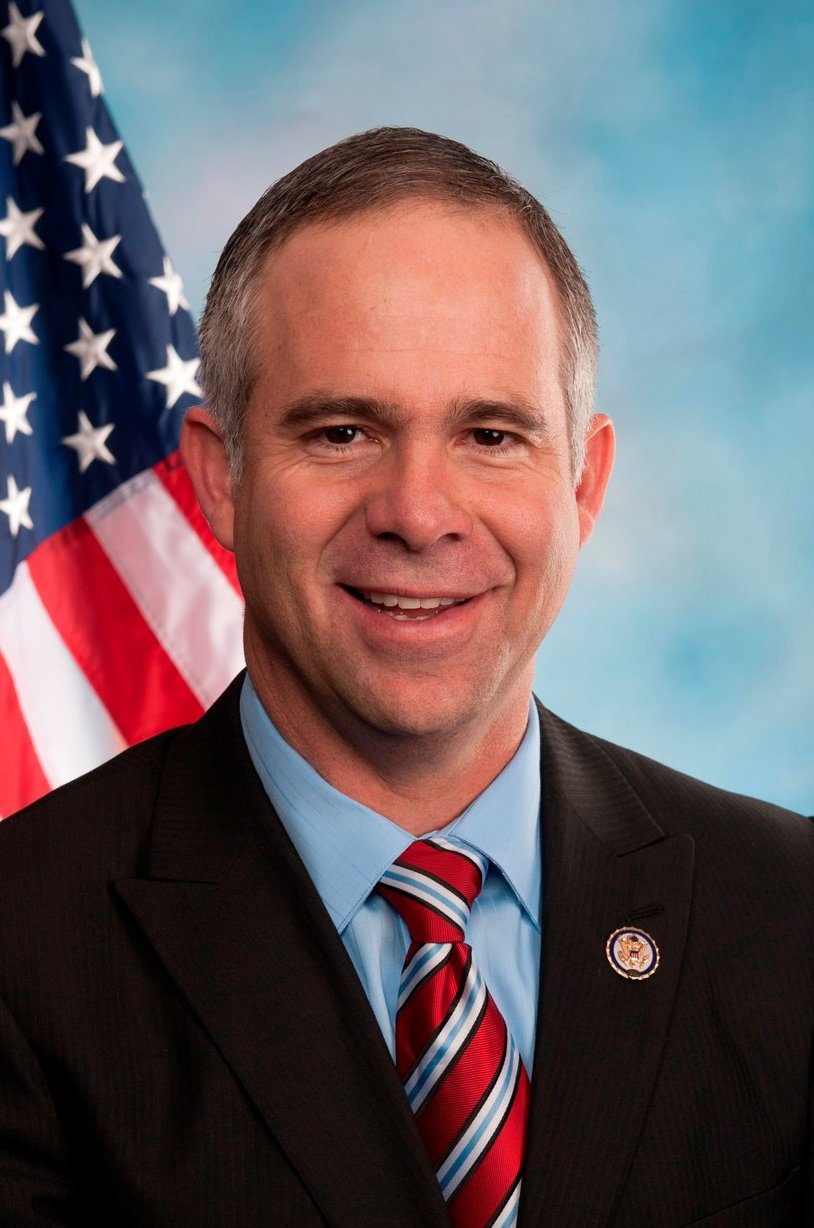
Nominee	Tim Huelskamp
Party	Republican
Popular vote	211,337
Percentage	100.0%
U.S. Representative before election
Tim Huelskamp
Republican
Elected U.S. Representative
Tim Huelskamp
Republican

The redrawn 1st district will continue to encompass all or parts of 62 counties in western and central Kansas, and also taking in a sliver of the Flint Hills region. The district will now also include Pottawatomie and Riley counties, including Manhattan and Kansas State University, but will no longer include Barber, Comanche, Edwards, Kiowa, Pratt, and Stafford counties, and parts of Greenwood, Marshall, Nemaha, and Pawnee counties.

Republican Tim Huelskamp, who had represented the 1st district since 2011, ran for re-election. He ran without challengers from any party.

=== Republican primary ===
==== Candidates ====
===== Nominee =====
- Tim Huelskamp, incumbent U.S. representative

==== Primary results ====
Republican primary results
Party	Candidate	Votes	%
Republican	Tim Huelskamp (incumbent)	79,633	100.0
Total votes		79,633	100.0

=== General election ===
==== Endorsements ====
Tim Huelskamp (R)

Organizations

- Campaign for Working Families
- Kansas Farm Bureau
- National Right to Life Committee
- NRA Political Victory Fund
- United States Chamber of Commerce

==== Predictions ====
Source	Ranking	As of
The Cook Political Report	Safe R	November 5, 2012
Rothenberg	Safe R	November 2, 2012
Roll Call	Safe R	November 4, 2012
Sabato's Crystal Ball	Safe R	November 5, 2012
NY Times	Safe R	November 4, 2012
RCP	Safe R	November 4, 2012
The Hill	Safe R	November 4, 2012

==== Results ====
Kansas' 1st congressional district, 2012
Party	Candidate	Votes	%
Republican	Tim Huelskamp (incumbent)	211,337	100.0
Total votes		211,337	100.0
Republican hold			

== District 2 ==
2012 Kansas's 2nd congressional district election
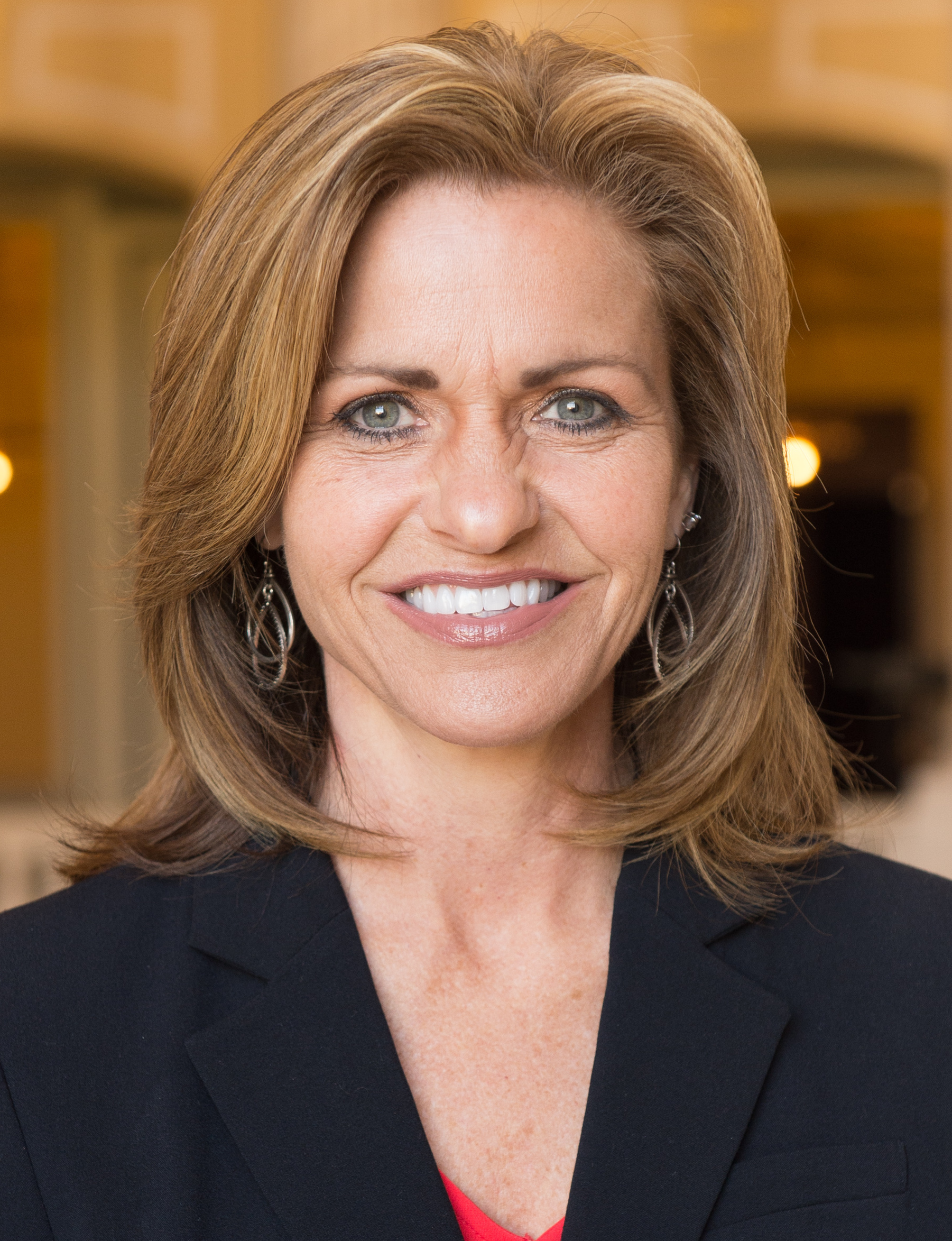

Nominee	Lynn Jenkins	Tobias Schlingensiepen
Party	Republican	Democratic
Popular vote	167,463	113,735
Percentage	57.0%	38.7%
- County results Jenkins: 50–60% 60–70% 70–80% Schlingensiepen: 40–50% 50–60%
U.S. Representative before election
Lynn Jenkins
Republican
Elected U.S. Representative
Lynn Jenkins
Republican

The redrawn 2nd district will continue to encompass Allen, Anderson, Atchison, Bourbon, Brown, Cherokee, Coffey, Crawford, Doniphan, Franklin, Jackson, Jefferson, Labette, Leavenworth, Linn, Neosho, Osage, Shawnee, Wilson, and Woodson, and parts of Douglas, Miami, and Nemaha counties. The district will now also include Montgomery County, parts of Marshall County, and the remainder of Douglas and Nemaha counties, but will no longer include Pottawatomie, Riley, and parts of Miami counties. The district lost Kansas State University to the first district, but gained the state's other major college, the University of Kansas.

Republican Lynn Jenkins, who had represented the 2nd district since 2009, ran for re-election.

Dennis Hawver ran as the Libertarian nominee.

=== Republican primary ===
==== Candidates ====
===== Nominee =====
- Lynn Jenkins, incumbent U.S. representative

=== Democratic primary ===
==== Candidates ====
===== Nominee =====
- Tobias Schlingensiepen, pastor and police chaplain

===== Eliminated in primary =====
- Scott Barnhart, farmer and Lawrence attorney
- Bob Eye, attorney

==== Primary results ====
Democratic primary results
Party	Candidate	Votes	%
Democratic	Tobias Schlingensiepen	11,747	39.5
Democratic	Bob Eye	10,353	34.8
Democratic	Scott Barnhart	7,627	25.6
Total votes		29,727	100.0

=== General election ===
==== Endorsements ====
Lynn Jenkins (R)

U.S. representatives

- Dave Camp, U.S. representative from Michigan's 4th congressional district (1991–present)
- Tom Cole, U.S. representative from Oklahoma's 4th congressional district (2003–present)
- Scott DesJarlais, U.S. representative from Tennessee's 4th congressional district (2011–present)
- Doc Hastings, U.S. representative from Washington's 4th congressional district (1995–present)
- Jeb Hensarling, U.S. representative from Texas's 5th congressional district (2003–present)
- Patrick McHenry, U.S. representative from North Carolina's 10th congressional district (2005–present)

Labor unions

- National Association of Letter Carriers

Organizations

- Kansas Farm Bureau
- Maggie's List
- National Right to Life Committee
- NRA Political Victory Fund
- United States Chamber of Commerce
Tobias Schlingensiepen (D)

U.S. representatives

- Martha Keys, U.S. representative from Kansas's 2nd congressional district (1975–1979)
- William R. Roy, U.S. representative from Kansas's 2nd congressional district (1971–1975)

Statewide officials

- Robert Harder, Secretary of the Kansas Department of Social and Rehabilitation (1967–1987)

State legislators

- Marti Crow, former state representative

Labor unions

- AFL-CIO

Newspapers

- The Kansas City Star

Individuals

- Bob Eye, attorney and candidate for this seat in 2012
- John Frieden, attorney and nominee for this seat in 1996

==== Predictions ====
Source	Ranking	As of
The Cook Political Report	Safe R	November 5, 2012
Rothenberg	Safe R	November 2, 2012
Roll Call	Safe R	November 4, 2012
Sabato's Crystal Ball	Safe R	November 5, 2012
NY Times	Safe R	November 4, 2012
RCP	Safe R	November 4, 2012
The Hill	Safe R	November 4, 2012

==== Results ====
Kansas' 2nd congressional district, 2012
Party	Candidate	Votes	%
Republican	Lynn Jenkins (incumbent)	167,463	57.0
Democratic	Tobias Schlingensiepen	113,735	38.7
Libertarian	Dennis Hawver	12,520	4.3
Total votes		293,718	100.0
Republican hold			

External links

- Lynn Jenkins campaign website
- Tobias Schlingensiepen campaign website
- Jenkins, Schlingensiepen spar in 2nd District forum, The Topeka Capital-Journal, September 30, 2012

== District 3 ==
2012 Kansas's 3rd congressional district election

Nominee	Kevin Yoder	Joel Balam
Party	Republican	Libertarian
Popular vote	201,087	92,675
Percentage	68.5%	31.5%
- County results Yoder: 50–60% 70–80%
U.S. Representative before election
Kevin Yoder
Republican
Elected U.S. Representative
Kevin Yoder
Republican

The redrawn 3rd district will continue to encompass Johnson and Wyandotte counties. The district will now also include the northeastern part of Miami County, but will no longer include the eastern part of Douglas County.

Republican Kevin Yoder, who had represented the 3rd district since 2011, ran for re-election. Joel Balam, a college professor, ran as the Libertarian nominee. Even though he lost, Balam's 31.5% set a new record for the highest percentage a Libertarian candidate ever received in any U.S. House election, mostly because Yoder had no Democratic opponent running against him.

=== Republican primary ===
==== Candidates ====
===== Nominee =====
- Kevin Yoder, incumbent U.S. representative

==== Primary results ====
Republican primary results
Party	Candidate	Votes	%
Republican	Kevin Yoder (incumbent)	50,270	100.0
Total votes		50,270	100.0

=== General election ===
==== Endorsements ====
Kevin Yoder (R)

Organizations

- Kansas Farm Bureau
- National Right to Life Committee
- NRA Political Victory Fund
- United States Chamber of Commerce

Newspapers

- The Kansas City Star

==== Predictions ====
Source	Ranking	As of
The Cook Political Report	Safe R	November 5, 2012
Rothenberg	Safe R	November 2, 2012
Roll Call	Safe R	November 4, 2012
Sabato's Crystal Ball	Safe R	November 5, 2012
NY Times	Safe R	November 4, 2012
RCP	Safe R	November 4, 2012
The Hill	Safe R	November 4, 2012

==== Results ====
Kansas' 3rd congressional district, 2012
Party	Candidate	Votes	%
Republican	Kevin Yoder (incumbent)	201,087	68.5
Libertarian	Joel Balam	92,675	31.5
Total votes		293,762	100.0
Republican hold			

== District 4 ==
2012 Kansas's 4th congressional district election

Nominee	Mike Pompeo	Robert Tillman	Thomas Jefferson
Party	Republican	Democratic	Libertarian
Popular vote	161,094	81,770	16,058
Percentage	62.2%	31.6%	6.2%
- County results Pompeo: 50–60% 60–70% 70–80% 80–90%
U.S. Representative before election
Mike Pompeo
Republican
Elected U.S. Representative
Mike Pompeo
Republican

The redrawn 4th district will continue to encompass Butler, Chautauqua, Cowley, Elk, Harper, Harvey, Kingman, Sedgwick, and Sumner counties, as well as the southern part of Greenwood county. The district will now also include Barber, Comanche, Edwards, Kiowa, Pratt, and Stafford counties, the remainder of Greenwood County, and the southwestern part of Pawnee County, but will no longer include Montgomery County.

Republican Mike Pompeo, who had represented the 4th district since 2011, ran for re-election. Thomas Jefferson, a computer technician formerly known as Jack Talbert, ran as the Libertarian nominee.

=== Republican primary ===
==== Candidates ====
===== Nominee =====
- Mike Pompeo, incumbent U.S. representative

==== Primary results ====
Republican primary results
Party	Candidate	Votes	%
Republican	Mike Pompeo (incumbent)	60,195	100.0
Total votes		60,195	100.0

=== Democratic primary ===
==== Candidates ====
===== Nominee =====
- Robert Tillman, retired court officer and candidate for this seat in 2010

===== Eliminated in primary =====
- Esau Freeman, painter

==== Primary results ====
Democratic primary results
Party	Candidate	Votes	%
Democratic	Robert Tillman	11,224	70.8
Democratic	Esau Freeman	4,618	29.1
Total votes		15,842	100.0

=== General election ===
==== Endorsements ====
Mike Pompeo (R)

Organizations

- Campaign for Working Families
- Kansas Farm Bureau
- National Right to Life Committee
- NRA Political Victory Fund
- United States Chamber of Commerce

==== Predictions ====
Source	Ranking	As of
The Cook Political Report	Safe R	November 5, 2012
Rothenberg	Safe R	November 2, 2012
Roll Call	Safe R	November 4, 2012
Sabato's Crystal Ball	Safe R	November 5, 2012
NY Times	Safe R	November 4, 2012
RCP	Safe R	November 4, 2012
The Hill	Safe R	November 4, 2012

==== Results ====
Kansas' 4th congressional district, 2012
Party	Candidate	Votes	%
Republican	Mike Pompeo (incumbent)	161,094	62.2
Democratic	Robert Tillman	81,770	31.6
Libertarian	Thomas Jefferson	16,058	6.2
Total votes		258,922	100.0
Republican hold			
