= Child Tax Credit Improvement Act of 2014 =

Proposed United States law

- Long title: To amend the Internal Revenue Code of 1986 to make improvements to the child tax credit.
- Announced in: the 113th United States Congress
- Sponsored by: Rep. Lynn Jenkins (R, KS-2)
- Number of co-sponsors: 2

Legislative history
- Introduced in the House as H.R. 4935 by Rep. Lynn Jenkins (R, KS-2) on June 23, 2014; Committee consideration by United States House Committee on Ways and Means; Passed the House on July 25, 2014 (237-173)

The Child Tax Credit Improvement Act of 2014 (H.R. 4935) is a bill that would amend the Internal Revenue Code with respect to the child tax credit. The bill would require taxpayers claiming the child tax credit to provide their Social Security Numbers, a change that would prevent undocumented immigrants from claiming the credit. The bill would index the child credit to inflation.

The bill was introduced into the United States House of Representatives during the 113th United States Congress.

== Background ==
A study by the United States Department of Agriculture found that it costs a middle-income family more than $241,000 to raise a child up to age 18.

== Provisions of the bill ==
This summary is based largely on the summary provided by the Congressional Research Service, a public domain source.

The Child Tax Credit Improvement Act of 2014 would amend the Internal Revenue Code, with respect to the child tax credit, to: (1) increase from $110,00 to $150,000 ($75,000 for individual taxpayers and married taxpayers filing separately) the threshold amount applicable to married couples filing joint tax returns above which such tax credit is reduced, and (2) allow an inflation adjustment to the threshold amounts and the $1,000 credit amount beginning after 2014.

== Congressional Budget Office report ==
This summary is based largely on the summary provided by the Congressional Budget Office, as ordered reported by the House Committee on Ways and Means on June 25, 2014. This is a public domain source.

H.R. 4935 would increase the amount of the child tax credit and the income thresholds at which the credit begins to phase out for taxpayers. Under current law, an individual may claim a tax credit of $1,000 for each qualifying child under the age of 17. H.R. 4935 would index the $1,000 amount for inflation starting in 2015. In addition, under current law the aggregate amount of child credits that may be claimed is phased out for married individuals filing joint tax returns with modified adjusted gross income over $110,000 and for unmarried individuals with such income over $75,000. H.R. 4935 would increase the beginning of the phaseout for joint filers to $150,000, and it would index for inflation the beginning points of the income phaseouts for all taxpayers starting in 2015. For married taxpayers filing separately, the beginning of the income phaseout would increase from $55,000 under current law to $75,000, indexed for inflation.

The staff of the Joint Committee on Taxation (JCT) estimates that enacting H.R. 4935 would reduce revenues over the 2014-2024 period by about $93.9 billion, and increase direct spending by about $21.0 billion over that period. JCT therefore estimates that enacting the legislation would increase federal budget deficits by about $114.9 billion over the 2014-2024 period.

The Statutory Pay-As-You-Go Act of 2010 establishes budget-reporting and enforcement procedures for legislation affecting direct spending and revenues. Because enacting H.R. 4935 would affect revenues and direct spending, pay-as-you-go procedures apply.

JCT has determined that the bill contains no intergovernmental or private-sector mandates as defined in the Unfunded Mandates Reform Act.

== Procedural history ==
The Child Tax Credit Improvement Act of 2014 was introduced into the United States House of Representatives on June 23, 2014, by Rep. Lynn Jenkins (R, KS-2). It was referred to the United States House Committee on Ways and Means. On July 17, 2014, the bill was reported (amended) alongside House Report 113-527. The bill passed the House on July 25, 2014, in a vote of 237–173.

The White House threatened to veto the bill.

== Debate and discussion ==
Rep. Sam Johnson (R-TX) supported the bill. He said that "right now the IRS is providing this refundable child tax credit to those who are here illegally," arguing that "the last thing we need is to continue to encourage folks from Central America to make the dangerous and life-threatening trek to Texas."

Rep. Jim McDermott (D-WA) opposed the bill, arguing that "this provision will harm millions of American kids who are in the United States living in immigrant families."

Rep. Rubén Hinojosa (D-TX) accused House Republicans of "attacks on the Latino community" with this bill as an example.

Elaine Maag, writing in The Christian Science Monitor, argued that Jenkins' "proposed expansions are ill-targeted and fail to address the credit's biggest looming issue: the change in refundability that will hit the poorest recipients after 2017." According to Maag, the plan would be improved if the credit was made refundable for all families so that families so poor they had no tax liability could still benefit from the credit.

== See also ==
- List of bills in the 113th United States Congress
