= John Littlejohn (disambiguation) =

John Littlejohn (1931–1994) was an American blues musician. The name can also refer to:

- John Littlejohn (preacher) (1756–1836), American Methodist preacher and politician
- John B. Littlejohn (1937–2014), Kansas politician and football player
