= Vince Cook =

American politician (1946–2020)

Member of the Kansas House of Representatives from the 52nd district
- In office November 1997 – January 11, 1999
- Preceded by: Tom Bradley
- Succeeded by: Lynn Jenkins

Personal details
- Born: Charles Cook; August 27, 1946 Topeka, Kansas
- Died: September 29, 2020 (aged 74) Topeka, Kansas
- Party: Republican
- Spouses: Carol Hochard (m. 1966; div.); Shirley Cook (m. 1988)
- Children: 4
- Education: Washburn University

Charles "Vince" Cook (August 27, 1946 – September 29, 2020) was an American politician from the U.S. state of Kansas. A Republican, he served a partial term in the Kansas House of Representatives from 1997 to 1999 and spent eight years on the Topeka City Council.

== Political career ==
In the 1990 Republican primary election, Cook unsuccessfully challenged incumbent Jim Cates for the 52nd district seat in the Kansas House of Representatives. The following year, he was elected to the Topeka City Council, on which he served from 1991 to 1999.

In November 1997, the Shawnee County Republican Party appointed Cook to fill the vacancy in the 52nd district created by the resignation of Tom Bradley. Cook served simultaneously on the city council and in the state legislature, a practice that has since been prohibited, and donated his legislative salary to charity. He ran for a full term in 1998 but was defeated in the Republican primary by Lynn Jenkins.

== Personal life ==
Cook was a lifelong resident of Topeka, where he graduated from Hayden High School and Washburn University. He served in the U.S. Army during the Vietnam War. After returning to Kansas, he worked for the Santa Fe Railroad until his retirement in 2006, and also worked as a realtor.

Cook married Carol Hochard in 1966; they had four children and later divorced. He married Shirley Cook in 1988. He suffered several strokes in later life, the first in 2010. He died in Topeka on September 29, 2020, at the age of 74.
