= Ron Hein =

American politician (1949–2022)

Member of the Kansas Senate from the 20th district
- In office 1977 – September 18, 1984
- Preceded by: Bob Storey
- Succeeded by: Jim Cates

Member of the Kansas House of Representatives from the 52nd district
- In office 1975–1976
- Succeeded by: John B. Littlejohn

Personal details
- Born: November 7, 1949 Seneca, Kansas, U.S.
- Died: December 21, 2022 (aged 73) Kansas City, Kansas, U.S.
- Party: Republican
- Spouse(s): Catherine Lee Fischer (m. 1975); Julie J. Hein (m. 1989)
- Education: Washburn University (B.A.); Washburn University School of Law (J.D.)

Ronald R. Hein (November 7, 1949 – December 21, 2022) was an American lobbyist and politician who served as a Republican in the Kansas State Senate from 1977 to 1984, and in the Kansas House of Representatives from 1975 to 1976.

Hein was born in Seneca, Kansas, and was active in student government and politics during his childhood. He studied political science at Washburn University, and immediately entered law school at Washburn University School of Law. He ran for the Kansas House in 1974, while also studying for the bar exam, and won a seven-way primary with 35% of the vote. He won the general election with relative ease, and served in the House for one term.

In 1976, he successfully challenged fellow Republican Bob Storey in the primary for the 20th district in the Kansas Senate. He served two terms there, and declined to run for re-election due to a desire for higher salary. He unsuccessfully ran for a seat in the United States House of Representatives in 1978. Hein resigned from the State Senate in September of 1984 and Jim Cates was appointed to serve out the remainder of his term. Cates was swiftly succeeded in the state senate by fellow Republican Alicia Salisbury, who won the 1984 election and took office in January of 1985. Hein founded a lobbying firm after leaving office.

Hein died at the University of Kansas Hospital on December 21, 2022, at the age of 73.
