= Thomas S. Bradley =

American politician

Tom Bradley

Member of the Kansas House of Representatives from the 52nd district
- In office January 1993 – November 1997
- Preceded by: Jim Cates
- Succeeded by: Vince Cook

Personal details
- Born: June 14, 1948 (age 78) Topeka, Kansas
- Party: Republican

Thomas S. Bradley (born June 14, 1948) is an American politician who served in the Kansas House of Representatives from 1993 to 1997. He resigned in the fall of that year, and Vince Cook was appointed to serve out the remainder of his term.
