= Rob Bruchman =

American politician, businessman, entrepreneur and attorney

Member of the Kansas House of Representatives from the 20th district
- In office January 10, 2011 – January 9, 2017
- Preceded by: Kevin Yoder
- Succeeded by: Jan Kessinger

Personal details
- Born: May 2, 1978 (age 48) Prairie Village, Kansas
- Party: Republican
- Parent(s): Pat & Bob Bruchman

Rob Bruchman (May 2, 1978) is an American politician, businessman, entrepreneur and attorney from Kansas. He represented the 20th district (Overland Park in Johnson County) from 2010 to 2016.

Bruchman was an associate attorney for an AM Law 100 firm before founding the Bruchman Law Firm, LLC. He is licensed to practice law in Kansas, Missouri, and Illinois. His practice focuses on technology, fashion and the restaurant industry. Before becoming a lawyer he started a lawn care business when in high school and it continues to operate into the present.

Bruchman was first elected to the Kansas House of Representatives to represent the 20th district in 2010. He was one of the youngest members ever selected to serve as Chairman of the Johnson County Delegation. During this term in the House he also served as vice-chairman of the House Judiciary and Insurance Committees. He is also the author of the Kansas Series Limited Liability Company Act.
