= Clint Acheson =

American politician

Member of the Kansas House of Representatives from the 52nd district
- In office 1982 – January 1989
- Preceded by: John B. Littlejohn
- Succeeded by: Jim Cates

Personal details
- Born: October 22, 1913 Auburn, Kansas
- Died: October 15, 2008 (aged 94) Topeka, Kansas
- Party: Republican
- Spouse: Violet Acheson
- Education: Baker University

Clinton C. Acheson (October 22, 1913 – October 15, 2008) is an American politician who served in the Kansas House of Representatives from 1982 to January of 1989. He was appointed to his seat to replace John B. Littlejohn, who had resigned, and he won elections in 1982, 1984 and 1986, after which he was succeeded by Jim Cates.

Acheson was born on a farm near Auburn, Kansas. He attended Baker University and fought in World War II, where he served in the U.S. Army in the European theater and received a Bronze Star after fighting in the Battle of the Bulge. After his war service, Acheson worked for the Kansas Chamber of Commerce before being elected to the state legislature.
