= Jan Kessinger =

American politician

Member of the Kansas House of Representatives from the 20th district
- In office January 9, 2017 – January 11, 2021
- Preceded by: Rob Bruchman
- Succeeded by: Mari-Lynn Poskin

Personal details
- Born: Jan Henderson Kessinger; February 20, 1951 (age 75) Junction City, Kansas, U.S.
- Party: Republican
- Spouse: Jeanne
- Children: 3
- Education: University of Kansas
- Profession: Consultant

Jan Henderson Kessinger (born February 20, 1951) is an American politician and retired management consultant. He served as a Republican member for the 20th district in the Kansas House of Representatives from 2017 to 2021 and currently serves as an elected member and president of the Blue Valley School District Board of Education.

== Early life and education ==
Kessinger was born and raised in Junction City, Kansas and has lived in Overland Park for over 40 years. Kessinger served in the Kansas House of Representatives in 2016, where both his father and grandfather had previously served.

He earned his Bachelor of Science in journalism from the William Allen White School of Journalism at the University of Kansas and completed his Master's in Business Administration at Rockhurst University in 1988.

== Business career ==
Kessinger built his career in publishing, where he served in roles as varied as Sales Director, Associate Publisher, and Division Manager for Vance Publishing at The Packer, the leading business publication for the fresh fruit and vegetable industry.

Kessinger and his family later moved to Overland Park where founded ProNet, Vance Publishing's leading edge online service for the fresh produce industry.

In 1994, Kessinger established Henderson Kessinger Consulting (HKC, Inc.) as a global management, sales and marketing consulting firm.

In 2015, Kessinger was appointed to the Kansas Gaming and Racing Commission. In 2013 - 2014, he consulted for the Kansas Lottery and was tasked with restructuring and reorganizing the sales team.

Kessinger also works with local businesses as well as Fortune 500 firms with the goal of growing and developing strong work environments and employees, simultaneously generating sales growth and profits, and in turn, creating more jobs.

== Personal life ==
For over 20 years, Kessinger has been a member of the United Methodist Church of the Resurrection where he volunteers as a Congregational Care Minister. He also serves on the Staff Parish, is a small group leader and has taught adult education at the church. He's active in developing the Global Impact missions program and training at Church of the Resurrection. In 2014, he traveled to South Africa for three weeks to serve on a mission trip to Mooiplaas, a settlement outside of Pretoria.

== Political career ==
Kessinger was elected to the Kansas House of Representatives in 2016 to represent the 20th District, after defeating incumbent Rob Bruchman in the Republican primary in a wave election that saw the ascent of moderates in GOP primaries across Kansas in what was widely seen as a rebuke of then-Governor Sam Brownback's tax policies.

Kessinger served in the Kansas House of Representatives from 2017-2021. During his tenure, he served on the Appropriations Committee; Commerce, Labor and Economic Development Committee; the Transportation and Public Safety Budget Committee; and the Federal and State Affairs Committee.

While in office, Kessinger sponsored or co-sponsored legislation related to anti-discrimination protections, medical cannabis legalization, teacher contract due process, domestic violence protections, and repeal of the death penalty.

In 2019, Kessinger drew statewide attention after opposing an override of Governor Laura Kelly's veto of a bill requiring physicians to inform patients about disputed abortion-pill reversal procedures. Kessinger was the only Republican House member to vote against the override attempt.

In 2020, Kessinger bucked Republican leadership again as he voted to sustain the governor's veto of a resolution to put an amendment on the ballot to remove abortion rights from the Kansas Constitution. Kessinger was defeated in the 2020 Republican primary election by Jane Dirks, who later lost the general election to Democrat Mari-Lynn Poskin.

In 2022, Kessinger was appointed to fill a vacancy on the Blue Valley School District Board of Education, where he was later elected to a full term in 2023.

In 2025, Kessinger was selected to serve as President of the Blue Valley Board of Education by his peers.

== Kansas House of Representatives ==
2019-2020 Committees

- Commerce, Labor and Economic Development
- Transportation and Public Safety Budget
- Federal and State Affairs

2017-2018 Committees

- Commerce, Labor and Economic Development
- Transportation and Public Safety Budget
- Appropriations

== Electoral history ==
2016 Primary Election: Kansas House of Representatives, District 20
Party	Candidate	Votes	%
Republican	Jan Kessinger	2,277	54.74%
Republican	Rob Bruchman (Inc.)	1,883	45.26%

2016 General Election: Kansas House of Representatives, District 20
Party	Candidate	Votes	%
Republican	Jan Kessinger	9,153	64.93%
Democratic	Christopher McQueeny	4,944	35.07%

2018 General Election: Kansas House of Representatives, District 20
Party	Candidate	Votes	%
Republican	Jan Kessinger	7,982	60.30%
Democratic	Becky Barber	5,259	39.70%

2020 Primary Election: Kansas House of Representatives, District 20
Party	Candidate	Votes	%
Republican	Jane Dirks	2,863	57.20%
Republican	Jan Kessinger	2,139	42.80%

2023 General Election: Blue Valley Board of Education
Party	Candidate	Votes	%
Non-Partisan	Jan Kessinger	16,921	57.30%
Non-Partisan	Christine Vasquez	12,555	42.51%
