= John B. Littlejohn =

American politician

J.B. Littlejohn

Member of the Kansas House of Representatives from the 52nd district
- In office January 1977 – 1982
- Preceded by: Ron Hein
- Succeeded by: Clint Acheson

Personal details
- Born: March 17, 1937
- Died: July 6, 2014 (aged 77) Dallas, Texas
- Party: Republican
- Education: Kansas State University (undergraduate); University of Kansas (Master's

John B. Littlejohn (March 17, 1937 – July 6, 2014) was an American politician who served in the Kansas House of Representatives from 1977 to 1982.

Littlejohn attended Kansas State University, where he played college football as a defensive back. After his college career, he was drafted by the Green Bay Packers of the National Football League in the 1960 draft, as well as the Buffalo Bills of the American Football League; he signed with the Packers, but did not actually play any professional football.

Littlejohn received his master's degree from the University of Kansas and worked as a management consultant. He was the head of the Kansas City branch of the U.S. Department of Housing and Urban Development. In the 1976 election, he was elected as a Republican to the Kansas House of Representatives, the first African-American elected from Shawnee County. In 1982, he resigned his seat and was succeeded by Clint Acheson.
