= Marti Crow =

American politician (born 1944)

Member of the Kansas House of Representatives from the 41st district
- In office January 13, 1997 – January 10, 2011
- Preceded by: Clyde Graeber
- Succeeded by: Jana Goodman

Personal details
- Born: December 7, 1944 (age 81) Bryan, Texas, U.S.
- Party: Democratic
- Spouse: Michael Crow
- Education: Baker University; Washburn Law School
- Profession: Attorney

Marti Crow (born December 7, 1944) is a former Democratic member of the Kansas House of Representatives, who represented the 41st district. She served from 1997 - 2011. Crow did not seek re-election in 2010. Crow has resided in Leavenworth, Kansas, since 1974. She is an attorney/partner with Crow and Associates, along with her husband, Mike, and four other attorneys. She received a Bachelor's degree in secondary education in 1966 from Baker University and a Juris Doctor degree from Washburn Law School in 1993. While in law school, Crow served as an editor on the Washburn Law Review. She graduated from law school 4th in her class and magna cum laude. She taught eighth grade English and Social Studies for two years in the Shawnee Mission, Kansas schools 1966-68. After receiving her law license in 1993, she worked as an environmental planning consultant with the Kansas Department of Health and Environment, and as an attorney with the Kansas Department of Revenue.

Prior to her election to the House, Crow served on the Leavenworth USD 453 Board of Education (1983–1996), Leavenworth City Board of Zoning Appeals (1978-1990/1993-1996), and Leavenworth City Planning Commission (1978-1990/1993-1996). She was a member of the 1986 class of Leadership Kansas and one of the founders of Leadership Leavenworth. In 2009, she was named Citizen of the Year by the Leavenworth/Lansing Chamber of Commerce and honored as a "Defender of Education" by the Kansas Families for Education.

Crow grew up in an Air Force family, living in Texas, Alabama, Georgia, Missouri, Maryland, and in Germany and Okinawa in her youth. She met her husband, Mike Crow, at Baker University during college and they married in 1968. Mike served in VietNam and was badly injured in a helicopter crash. He and Marti spent eight months at Brooke General Hospital in San Antonio, Texas, while he recovered. The Crows have three grown children, Jennifer, Emily and Bryan.

== Issue positions ==
Crow's official website lists her main issues as Guantanamo detainees, family, health care, and education.

== Committee membership ==
- Education
- Veterans, Military and Homeland Security
- Judiciary
- Interstate Cooperation
- Joint Committee on Children's Issues

== Major Donors ==
The top 5 donors to Crow's 2008 campaign all come from professional organizations:

- 1. Life Science Fund of the GKC Chamber $1,000
- 2. Kansas National Education Assoc $1,000
- 3. Kansas Contractors Assoc $900
- 4. Kansas Optometric Assoc $750
- 5. Kansas Bankers Assoc $550
