= Alicia Salisbury =

American politician

Member of the Kansas Senate from the 20th district
- In office 1985 – January 8, 2001
- Preceded by: Jim Cates
- Succeeded by: Lynn Jenkins

Personal details
- Born: September 20, 1939 (age 86) Topeka, Kansas, U.S.
- Party: Republican
- Education: University of Kansas

Alicia Laing Salisbury (born September 20, 1939) is an American former politician who served as a Republican in the Kansas State Senate from 1984 to 2000.

Salisbury was born in Topeka into a political family; her father, Herbert Laing, was a member of the Kansas House of Representatives, and her grandfather, Henry Laing, was a longtime state senator. She attended the University of Kansas, graduating with a bachelor's degree in 1961. Prior to her service in the state legislature, Salisbury spent four years on the Kansas Board of Education.

In 1984, Salisbury was elected to the Kansas Senate, and she was re-elected in 1988, 1992 and 1996. She was considered a centrist in the Kansas Republican Party, opposed to the more conservative wing of the party; in 2000, she lost her primary election to a more-conservative challenger. After her time in the Senate, she won a seat on the Republican National Committee. Her split with the conservative wing continued and she endorsed Democratic Governor Laura Kelly's re-election in April 2022.
