= James Cates (Kansas politician) =

American politician

Jim Cates

Member of the Kansas House of Representatives from the 52nd district
- In office January 1989 – January 1993
- Preceded by: Clint Acheson
- Succeeded by: Tom Bradley

Member of the Kansas Senate from the 20th district
- In office September 27, 1984 – January 1985
- Preceded by: Ron Hein
- Succeeded by: Alicia Salisbury

Personal details
- Born: November 19, 1944
- Party: Republican

James Cates (born November 19, 1944) is an American politician who served in the Kansas House of Representatives and Kansas State Senate.

On September 27, 1984, Cates was appointed to fill out the remainder of the term in the 20th State Senate district, where Ron Hein had resigned, leaving a vacancy. He served there only briefly, after Alicia Salisbury won the 1984 election and assumed office in January 1985.

In 1988, Cates gained office in his own right, winning the election for Kansas House district 52. He won re-election in 1990, and was succeeded by Tom Bradley after the 1992 elections.

In addition to his time in the legislature, Cates hosted a radio talk show where he was noted for his anti-tax views.
