= Kevin Yoder =

American politician (born 1976)

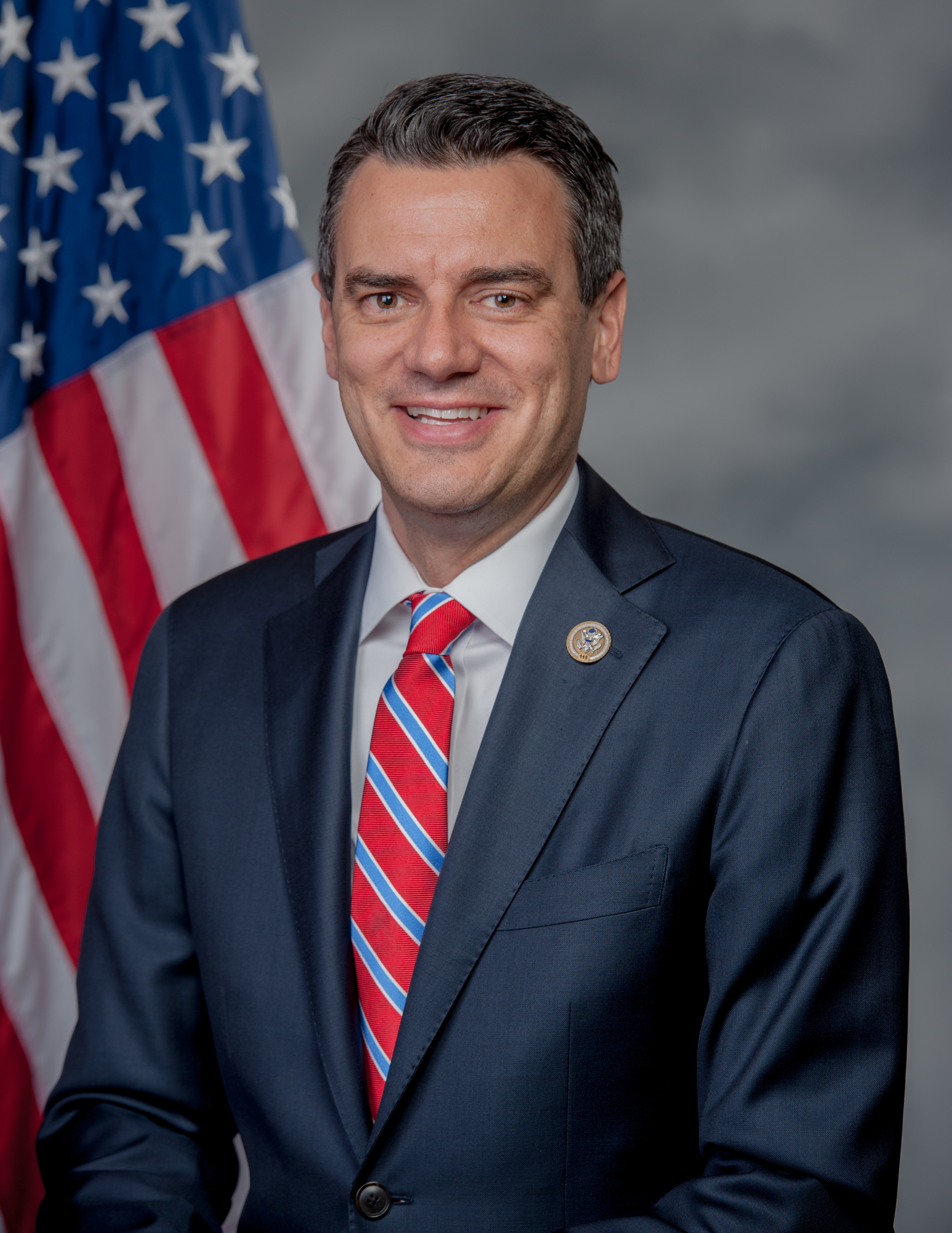

Member of the U.S. House of Representatives from Kansas's 3rd district
- In office January 3, 2011 – January 3, 2019
- Preceded by: Dennis Moore
- Succeeded by: Sharice Davids

Member of the Kansas House of Representatives from the 20th district
- In office January 13, 2003 – January 3, 2011
- Preceded by: Gerry Ray
- Succeeded by: Rob Bruchman

Personal details
- Born: Kevin Wayne Yoder; January 8, 1976 (age 50) Hutchinson, Kansas, U.S.
- Party: Republican
- Spouse: Brooke Yoder
- Children: 2
- Education: University of Kansas (BA, JD)
- Website: House website

Kevin Wayne Yoder (born January 8, 1976) is an American lawyer and former politician who served as a member of the United States House of Representatives for Kansas's 3rd congressional district from 2011 to 2019. A Republican, Yoder was the Kansas State Representative for the 20th district from 2003 to 2011. In his 2018 reelection bid, he was defeated by Democrat Sharice Davids by ten percentage points. After leaving Congress, he became a lobbyist for Venture Government Strategies.

== Early life and education ==
Yoder was born and raised on a grain and livestock farm in Yoder, Kansas, a small farming town outside of Hutchinson. He is the son of Susan Elizabeth Peck (née Alexander) and Wayne E. Yoder. His ancestry includes Northern Irish, German, and English.

Yoder graduated from Hutchinson High School and, in 1999, from the University of Kansas with a dual major in English and Political Science. He served as KU Student Body president, president of the Kansas Union Memorial Corporation Board of Directors, and as a board member of the KU Athletics Corporation. He was a member of Lambda Chi Alpha fraternity, served as president, and received the 2012 Order of Achievement award from Lambda Chi Alpha. While at KU, Yoder interned with the Kansas State Legislature. In 2002, he received a J.D. degree from the University of Kansas Law School where he served for two years as Student Bar Association President. Yoder has served on the KU Law School Board of Governors. He was a 2007 graduate of Leadership Kansas.

== Law career ==
Yoder worked as a law clerk for Payne and Jones from 2000 to 2001, then as a special assistant in the U.S. Department of Defense's Office of Counternarcotics in 2001. He joined Speer and Holliday LLP, a small law firm in Olathe, as an associate and became a partner in 2005.

Yoder is a member of the American Council of Young Political Leaders and the Kansas Bar Association, and has served on the board of directors of the Johnson County Bar Association.

== Kansas House of Representatives ==
Yoder was first elected to the Kansas House of Representatives (20th district) on January 13, 2003. He succeeded Gerry Ray. He was then subsequently re-elected to the office three times. The district includes portions of Overland Park and Leawood.

As chair of the Kansas State House Appropriations Committee, he had the responsibility to balance the budget, cut government spending, oppose raising taxes, and allocate over $13 billion in state revenue to public schools, universities, prisons, social services and highways. In March 2010, the committee introduced its budget plan. The proposed plan was defeated by a bipartisan group of moderate Republicans and Democrats in May 2010. Yoder also served on the Judiciary Committee from 2003 through 2011.

=== Committee assignments ===
- Appropriations (chair)
- Legislative Budget (chair)
- Judiciary
- Joint Committee of Congress on the Library

== U.S. House of Representatives ==
=== Elections ===
==== 2010 ====
On December 15, 2009, Yoder announced his intention to run for the open seat in the United States Congress. On August 3, 2010, he won the Republican primary with 45% of the vote, running against former State Representative Patricia Lightner, Dave King, Garry R. Klotz, Daniel Gilyeat, Jerry M. Malone, Craig McPherson, John Rysavy, and Jean Ann Uvodich.

He received the endorsement of The Kansas City Star, which stated, "He believes government spending has to be controlled and is best used when it spurs economic growth, a good stance in this jobless recovery. His experience as the Kansas House appropriations committee would serve him well in Congress". Yoder also received endorsement from the NRA Political Victory Fund.

During the general campaign, Yoder set up the website stephenemoore.com in the name of Stephene Moore, his Democratic opponent, and the wife of Dennis Moore, the retiring congressman. Yoder used the site to raise questions about her campaign and issue policy positions. Moore's campaign filed a complaint with the Federal Election Commission about the website on grounds that an "unauthorized committee" is not permitted to use the name of a candidate in the title of a special project or message if it "clearly and unambiguously" shows opposition to the named candidate. The FEC dismissed the complaint against Yoder on a 3-2 party-line vote, with Republican commissioners voting in Yoder's favor and Democratic commissioners voting in Moore's favor. In the general election, with 59% of the vote, Yoder won against Democratic nominee obstetrics nurse Stephene Moore and Libertarian nominee Jasmin Talbert.

==== 2012 ====
In the election of 2012, Yoder ran for re-election. He faced no opposition in the 2012 primary election. In the general election, Yoder was endorsed by The Kansas City Star, and faced Libertarian nominee Joel Balam, a college professor. Yoder won with 68% of the vote.

==== 2014 ====
In the election of 2014, Yoder again ran for re-election. He faced no opposition in the 2014 primary election. In the general election, Yoder faced Democratic nominee Kelly Kultala, a former member of the Kansas Senate. Yoder won with 60% of the vote. In the 2014 election cycle, "Securities and Investment" was the number one industry contributing to Yoder's campaign committee and leadership PAC. According to OpenSecrets, Yoder received $53,257 from the payday-loan industry in the 2014 election cycle.

==== 2016 ====
In May 2016, Yoder endorsed Donald Trump in the 2016 presidential race.

In 2016, Yoder was challenged in the Republican primary by retired U.S. Army lieutenant colonel Greg Goode of Louisburg, who ran on a far-right platform. Yoder defeated Goode, 64-36 percent. As of June 2016, Yoder had raised far more money in campaign contributions than either his Republican primary opponent or his Democratic rival.

In the November general election, Yoder faced Democratic nominee Jay Sidie of Mission Woods. According to an October 19, 2016, poll commissioned by the Democratic Congressional Campaign Committee, Sidie was polling four points behind Yoder. Yoder defeated Sidie by 10 points, winning 51% of the vote to Sidie's 41%.

==== 2018 ====
Through three quarters of 2017, Yoder had raised more money than any other congressional candidate in Kansas history up to that point in an election cycle. In the November 2018 general election, he was defeated by Democrat Sharice Davids who raised almost $1 million more than Yoder. Davids won 53.3% of the vote to Yoder's 44.2%, with Libertarian Chris Clemmons winning the remaining 2.5%.

=== Tenure ===
Yoder was a co-chairman of the Bipartisan Congressional Civility Caucus, Cancer Caucus, Deaf Caucus, and Beef Caucus.

In 2012, Yoder and Missouri Democratic Representative Emanuel Cleaver were jointly awarded the Consensus Civility award for their respectful and bipartisan efforts to work with members of both political parties. In 2017, the two representatives penned a CNN guest column on remaining united in response to the Congressional baseball shooting that left House Majority Whip Steve Scalise gravely injured.

In May 2018, Yoder became chairman of the Subcommittee on Homeland Security.

=== Committee assignments ===
112th Congress

- Committee on Appropriations
  - Subcommittee on Commerce, Justice, Science, and Related Agencies
  - Subcommittee on Financial Services and General Government
  - Subcommittee on Military Construction, Veterans Affairs, and Related Agencies

113th Congress

- Committee on Appropriations
  - Subcommittee on Financial Services and General Government
  - Subcommittee on Agriculture, Rural Development, Food and Drug Administration, and Related Agencies (Vice Chair)
  - Subcommittee on State, Foreign Operations, and Related Programs

114th Congress

- Committee on Appropriations
  - Subcommittee on Financial Services and General Government
  - Subcommittee on Agriculture, Rural Development, Food and Drug Administration, and Related Agencies
  - United States House Appropriations Subcommittee on Transportation, Housing and Urban Development, and Related Agencies
- Republican Study Committee

115th Congress

- Committee on Appropriations
  - Subcommittee on Homeland Security (Chair)
  - Subcommittee on Financial Services and General Government
  - Subcommittee on Agriculture, Rural Development, Food and Drug Administration, and Related Agencies
- Republican Study Committee
- Republican Main Street Partnership

=== Caucus memberships ===
- United States Congressional International Conservation Caucus
- Veterinary Medicine Caucus
- Climate Solutions Caucus
- U.S.-Japan Caucus

== Political positions ==
According to McClatchy, Yoder had by July 2018 voted with Trump 92 percent of the time.

=== Economic issues ===
==== Taxes ====
In December 2017, Yoder voted in favor of the Tax Cuts and Jobs Act of 2017.

==== Child care ====
Throughout the tax debate, Yoder focused his efforts on lowering the costs of child care as the lead sponsor of the Promoting Affordable Childcare for Everyone Act along with Democrat Stephanie Murphy of Florida. The two representatives met privately with Adviser to the President Ivanka Trump, who focused her efforts on child care throughout the tax debate as well, in October to pitch their legislation for inclusion in the Tax Cuts and Jobs Act. Although the bill was not eventually included in the final tax reform draft, Yoder fought alongside members of the House Ways and Means Committee to preserve child care tax credits and flex spending accounts in the new tax code.

==== Financial regulations ====
Yoder was responsible for the so-called "push-out" provision inserted into the 2014 spending bill, the text of which critics argued was written by Citigroup. Yoder denied the claim, arguing the amendment was based on bipartisan legislation called the Swaps Regulatory Improvement Act that had passed the House of Representatives in 2013 with votes from 70 Democrats. Yoder's amendment and the 2013 legislation rolled-back Section 716 of the Dodd–Frank Wall Street Reform and Consumer Protection Act of 2010 dealing with derivatives, credit-default swaps and other instruments (which some argued helped spark the 2008 financial crisis) uninsured by taxpayers if they went bad. Yoder said the measure was necessary to prevent smaller regional and community banks from being squeezed out of the swaps derivatives market entirely. In an editorial, the Kansas City Star wrote that Yoder had "played a regrettable role in the raucous government-funding exercise."

=== Domestic issues ===
==== Immigration ====
As Chairman of the House Homeland Security Appropriations Committee in 2018, Yoder secured $5 billion for 200 miles of new border barrier construction in the Rio Grande Valley region of the southern border, where cartels currently traffic most of the $64 billion in drugs and people each year into the United States. Yoder's bill also secured funding for 400 new ICE agents, 375 new CBP agents, nearly 4,000 new detention beds, money for opioid detection and other border enforcement measures. President Donald Trump subsequently tweeted that Yoder has his "full and total endorsement" for re-election, saying he is "strong on crime, strong on border." Having lost his 2018 re-election bid, the congressman will likely play an important role in shepherding the final passage of the border wall funding which might be telling on the President's legacy, as well as, determining the congressman's political future.

Yoder opposed sanctuary cities, which are jurisdictions that do not strictly enforce federal immigration laws, and has pushed legislation to withhold Homeland Security funds from those jurisdictions.

Yoder sponsored the Fairness for High-Skilled Immigrants Act, which would remove the per-nation cap on employment-based green cards, which the Cato Institute estimates is causing a backlog of anywhere between 230,000 and 2 million Indian nationals in the system, forcing them to wait between 50 and 250 years for green cards. The text of the bill was successfully adopted into Yoder's must-pass Homeland Security Appropriations bill in July.

==== Health care ====
Yoder opposed the Affordable Care Act (Obamacare). On May 4, 2017, he voted to repeal the act and pass the American Health Care Act.

In March 2017, ProPublica reported that Yoder had said that the quality of health care in the country had declined due to the Affordable Care Act, an assertion that ProPublica found to be without proof and in contradiction to some data.

==== Scientific research ====
Yoder has advocated for increased funding for biomedical research. In 2016, Yoder tried to convince "the most ardent or strident conservatives in the House of Representatives to get them to embrace research" as a fiscally and morally responsible thing to fund. More than 100 House Republicans, including conservative members like Dave Brat, signed onto his letter to House leadership pushing for a $3 billion bump. In the end, Congress provided the largest funding increase for research in 12 years. At the end of that year, he penned a guest column for Fox News, arguing that support for cures to diseases and federal funding for medical research could be an issue to rally a divided country following the 2016 presidential election.

In 2017, Yoder vocally opposed the Trump Administration's proposed budget cuts to the National Institutes of Health. Instead, Yoder worked with colleagues on the House Appropriations Committee to secure another $2 billion funding increase for the NIH for Fiscal Year 2017.

==== Technology ====
In 2017, Yoder voted for a Congressional Review Act resolution repealing an Obama-era Federal Communications Commission rule regarding internet privacy. Yoder broke ranks, siding with 190 Democrats (and 14 Republicans) when he voted against allowing internet providers to snoop on users and sell their personal online history.

In 2013, Yoder, along with Democrat Rep. Jared Polis (D-CO) introduced the Email Privacy Act which prevents law enforcement officials to access email communications without warrants. Congress passed it in 2016 by a vote of 419–0, and again by a unanimous vote in 2017.

Yoder also reintroduced the Kelsey Smith Act, legislation that required cell phone carriers to provide location information to the authorities in situations involving "risk of death or serious physical injury." In May 2016, the bill failed to receive the two-thirds required majority of the House of Representatives to pass under a procedural hurdle, due to privacy concerns.

==== Disaster aid ====
In September 2017, Yoder voted against a bipartisan deal to increase the debt ceiling while also providing relief to the communities devastated by Hurricane Harvey.

==== Environment ====
Regarding climate change, Yoder said in 2015, "Global warming is a concern that should be debated, but most proposals require huge amount of American sacrifice with little effect on global temperatures, and we should oppose those at every turn."

Yoder supported President Trump's withdrawal from the Paris Climate Agreement, saying that the costs of the agreement outweighed the benefits.

=== Social issues ===
==== Abortion ====
Yoder has a 100 percent voting record from the National Right to Life Committee for his abortion-related voting record.

==== LGBT issues ====
In 2017, Yoder split with President Trump, opposing his announced ban on transgender individuals serving openly in the military.

Yoder has a zero rating from the Human Rights Campaign for his LGBT rights voting record. Yoder opposed same-sex marriage and believed it was federal overreach legalizing it nationally.

=== Controversies ===
In February 2009, Yoder was pulled over for speeding on the K-10 expressway. After passing a field sobriety test, Yoder declined the officer's request to take a roadside Breathalyzer test. The officer cited Yoder for speeding and for refusing to take the breathalyzer test, and then let Yoder drive himself home. In a plea agreement, the speeding charge was dropped. Yoder pleaded guilty to refusing law enforcement's request for a breath test and paid a $165 fine.

In 2012, Politico reported that about a year earlier, on August 4, 2011, Yoder partook in a late-night dip in the Sea of Galilee while on a fact-finding trip to Israel with other members of Congress. According to the report, about 20 of the 30 members of the trip joined in, with Yoder swimming nude. Yoder apologized to his constituents and said in a statement that "it was dark out with visibility limited to only a few feet," and said he was in the water for about 10 seconds before climbing out. Yoder continued, "Part of the reason I made that decision at that moment was there was really nobody in the vicinity who could see me," he said. "I dove in, hopped right back out, put my clothes on and, regardless, that was still not the behavior people expected out of their congressman." The FBI investigated the matter but did not interview either Yoder or any member of his staff. Then-House Majority Leader Eric Cantor, who was present, reprimanded Yoder for the incident.

== Personal life ==
Yoder and his wife, Brooke, live in Overland Park with their two daughters. They are members of the Church of the Resurrection in Leawood. He is a fan of the Kansas City Chiefs and Kansas City Royals.

Following his service in the House of Representatives, Yoder worked as a partner at HHQ Ventures, a DC lobbying firm. He currently works as a lobbyist with Venture Government Strategies. In 2025, he criticized President Donald Trump’s tariff policies.

== Electoral history ==
2002 election for state legislature

Kevin Yoder (R) 55% Kirk Perucca (D) 45%

2004 election for state legislature

Kevin Yoder (R) 67% Max Skidmore (D) 33%

2006 election for state legislature'

Kevin Yoder (R) 58% Alex Holsinger (D) 42%

2008 election for state legislature

Kevin Yoder (R) 65% Gary Glauberman (D) 35%

2010 election for U.S. House of Representatives

US House election, 2010: Kansas District 3
Party	Candidate	Votes	%	±%
Republican	Kevin Yoder	136,246	58	
Democratic	Stephene Moore	90,123	39	
Libertarian	Jasmin Talbert	6,846	3	
Total votes		233,285	100	

2012 election for U.S. House of Representatives

Election results, Kansas' 3rd district, November 6, 2012
Party	Candidate	Votes	%
Republican	Kevin Yoder (incumbent)	201,087	69
Libertarian	Joel Balam	92,675	31
Total votes		293,762	100

2014 election for U.S. House of Representatives

Kansas's 3rd Congressional District, 2014
Party	Candidate	Votes	%
Republican	Kevin Yoder (Incumbent)	134,493	60
Democratic	Kelly Kultala	89,584	40
Total votes		224,077	100

2016 election for U.S. House of Representatives

Kansas's 3rd Congressional District, 2016
Party	Candidate	Votes	%
Republican	Kevin Yoder (Incumbent)	176,022	51.3
Democratic	Jay Sidie	139,300	40.6
Libertarian	Steve Hohe	27,791	8.1
Total votes		343,113	100

2018 election for U.S. House of Representatives

Kansas's 3rd Congressional District, 2018
Party	Candidate	Votes	%
Democratic	Sharice Davids	164,253	53.3
Republican	Kevin Yoder (incumbent)	136,104	44.2
Libertarian	Chris Clemmons	7,643	2.5
Total votes		308,000	100

U.S. House of Representatives
Preceded by Dennis Moore	Member of the U.S. House of Representatives from Kansas's 3rd congressional district 2011–2019	Succeeded by Sharice Davids
U.S. order of precedence (ceremonial)
Preceded by Michele Bachmann as Former U.S. Representative	Order of precedence of the United States as Former U.S. Representative	Succeeded by Hal Daub as Former U.S. Representative
