= Lynn Jenkins =

American politician (born 1963)

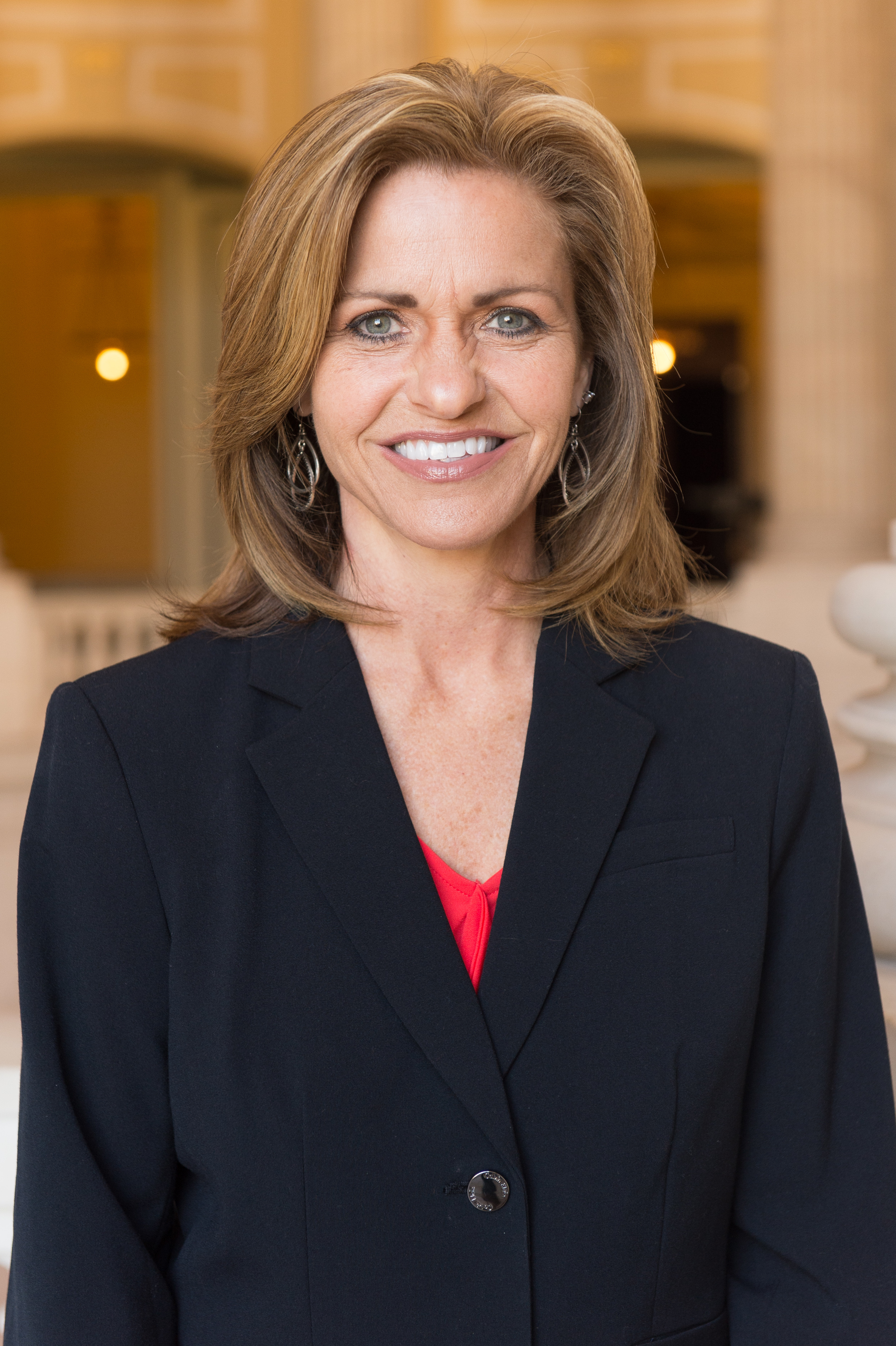
- Official portrait, 2016

Vice Chair of the House Republican Conference
- In office January 3, 2013 – January 3, 2017
- Leader: John Boehner; Paul Ryan
- Preceded by: Cathy McMorris Rodgers
- Succeeded by: Doug Collins

Member of the U.S. House of Representatives from Kansas's 2nd district
- In office January 3, 2009 – January 3, 2019
- Preceded by: Nancy Boyda
- Succeeded by: Steve Watkins

37th Treasurer of Kansas
- In office January 13, 2003 – January 3, 2009
- Governor: Kathleen Sebelius
- Preceded by: Tim Shallenburger
- Succeeded by: Dennis McKinney

Member of the Kansas Senate from the 20th district
- In office January 8, 2001 – January 13, 2003
- Preceded by: Alicia Salisbury
- Succeeded by: Bill Bunten

Member of the Kansas House of Representatives from the 52nd district
- In office January 11, 1999 – January 8, 2001
- Preceded by: Vince Cook
- Succeeded by: Lana Gordon

Personal details
- Born: Lynn Haag; June 10, 1963 (age 63) Holton, Kansas, U.S.
- Party: Republican
- Spouse: Scott Jenkins (m. 1983; div. 2008)
- Children: 2
- Education: Kansas State University (attended); Weber State University (BS)
- Jenkins's voice Jenkins opposing the Iran nuclear deal. Recorded September 11, 2015

Lynn Haag Jenkins (born June 10, 1963) is an American politician and lobbyist who served as the U.S. representative for Kansas's 2nd congressional district, in office from 2009 to 2019. She previously served as Kansas State Treasurer from 2003 to 2009, in the Kansas House of Representatives from 1999 to 2000 and the Kansas Senate from 2000 to 2002. She is a member of the Republican Party.

She is a founder of Maggie's List, a political action committee designed to increase the number of conservative women elected to federal public office. Jenkins announced in January 2017 that she would not be running for re-election in 2018 and she left the House when her term expired on January 3, 2019.

== Early life, education, and early political career ==
Jenkins was born in Holton, Kansas, and is a sixth-generation Kansan. She was raised on a dairy farm in Holton, where she attended high school. Later she graduated from Kansas State University and Weber State College with an accounting major and an economics minor. She is a Certified Public Accountant.

Jenkins served for two years in the Kansas House of Representatives and for one term in the Kansas Senate. She was elected state treasurer in 2002, at which time she began serving in a number of organizations, including as president of the National Association of State Treasurers (NAST).

Lynn's brother is Chris Haag and she also has a sister.

== U.S. House of Representatives ==
=== Elections ===
==== 2008 ====
On April 4, 2007, Jenkins announced that she had filed papers with the Federal Election Commission as a first step of running for the U.S. House of Representatives for Kansas's 2nd congressional district.

Her opponent in the Republican primary was former U.S. Representative Jim Ryun, who served five terms before being defeated in 2006 by prior Democratic incumbent Nancy Boyda, who ran for reelection. In the campaign between Jenkins and Ryun, he criticized her for having voted for tax increases while a state legislator, and she criticized him for having supported earmarks. Jenkins was seen as more moderate than Ryun and received the support of the Republican Leadership Council. The primary was held on August 5, 2008. Jenkins won the Republican nomination by approximately 1,000 votes. In the general election, Jenkins went on to defeat Boyda 51%–46%.

==== 2010 ====
Jenkins won re-election to a second term, defeating Democratic candidate Cheryl Hudspeth, 63%–32%.

==== 2012 ====
Jenkins won re-election to a third term, defeating Democratic candidate Tobias Schlingensiepen, 57%–39%.

=== Tenure ===
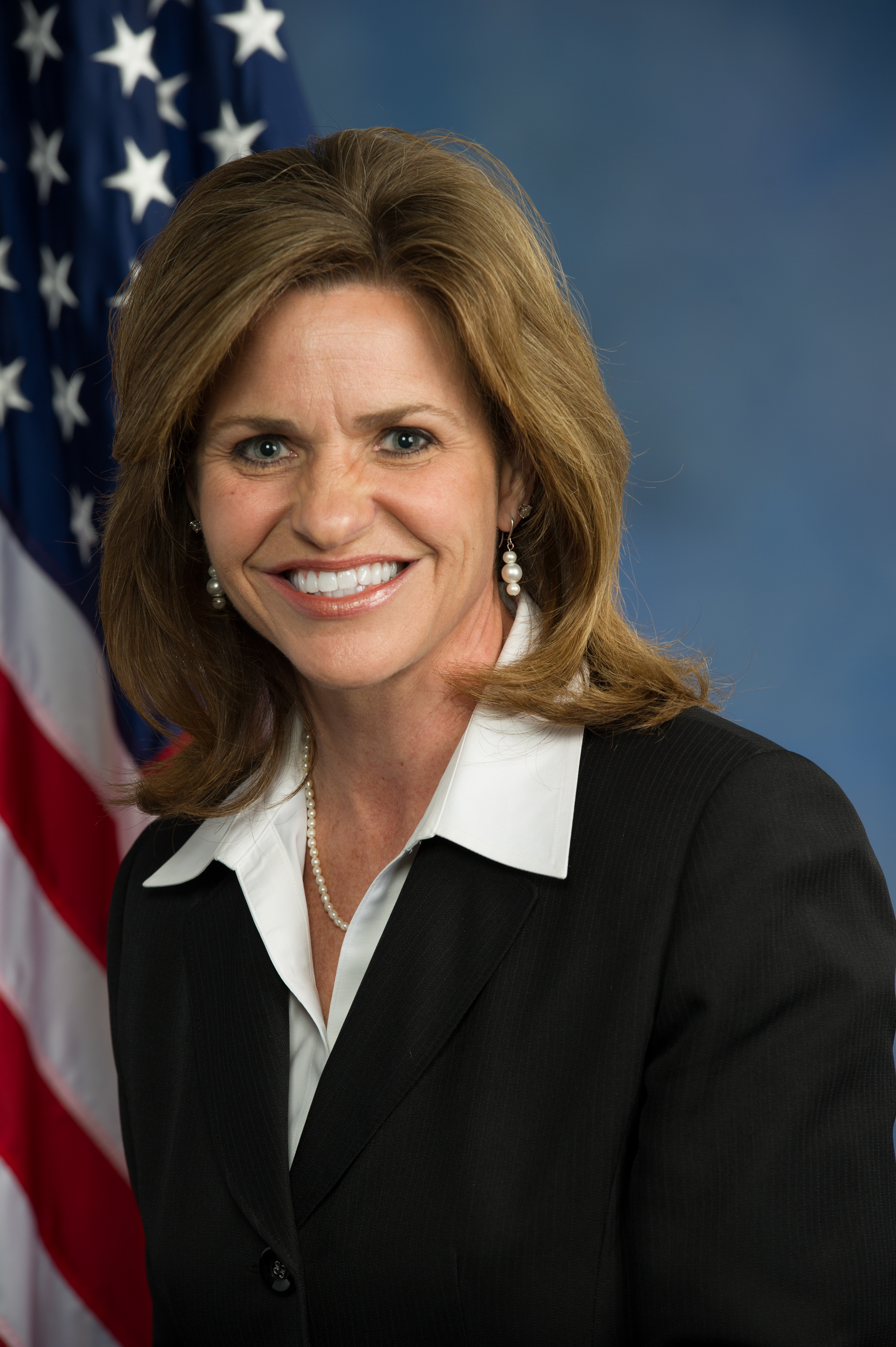
Jenkins during the 113th Congress

In June 2013, after the United States farm bill failed again, Jenkins claimed she was disappointed in House Republicans, who were divided over the issue. She blamed the failure in the House on the inability to find common ground, stating that there are still too many Democratic and Republican members who allowed politics to trump progress.

Jenkins was ranked as the 96th most bipartisan member of the House during the 114th United States Congress by The Lugar Center and the McCourt School of Public Policy.

In December 2017, Jenkins voted in favor of the Tax Cuts and Jobs Act of 2017. Jenkins says the bill will provide tax relief to middle-class Americans and create more jobs. She also claims the bill will improve the economy and therefore will "pay down our national debt," despite the bill being anticipated to add over $1 trillion to the national debt.

==== "The Great White Hope" ====
At a town hall on August 19, 2009, Jenkins commented on President Barack Obama's policies, saying, "Republicans are struggling right now to find the great white hope." Jenkins said to the crowd. "I suggest to any of you who are concerned about that, who are Republican, there are some great young Republican minds in Washington." Jenkins then gave the names of several young, white Republicans. "The Great White Hope," a phrase that originated in the early 1900s, was a reference to any boxer whites hoped would finally defeat the World Heavyweight Champion Jack Johnson, who was black. Jenkins later apologized, clarifying her remarks and saying that "I was explaining that there are some bright lights in the House, and I was unaware of any negative connotation. If I offended somebody, obviously I apologize." Only one month earlier she had voted for a resolution urging President Obama to pardon black U.S. boxer Johnson, which had text that explained the meaning of the phrase "The Great White Hope". Jenkins responded by saying she had voted for the resolution without reading it first.

==== Lobbying ====
Before her tenure in Congress ended, Jenkins set up the lobbying firm LJ Strategies. She registered the firm in Kansas on November 20, 2018. Jenkins' spokesperson said that Jenkins did not intend to actively seek clients until her congressional term had ended.

=== Committee assignments ===
Jenkins was assigned to the Committee on Financial Services including the Subcommittee on Capital Markets, Insurance, and Government-Sponsored Enterprises and the Subcommittee on Housing and Community Opportunity. She was named to the Ways and Means Committee when the Republicans gained control of the House for the 112th Congress.

Jenkins was a member of the Republican Study Committee, the Republican Main Street Partnership, and the Tea Party Caucus.

=== Caucus memberships ===
- Republican Study Committee
- Republican Main Street Partnership
- Tea Party Caucus
- Congressional Cement Caucus
- Congressional Prayer Caucus
- Tea Party Caucus
- Congressional Constitution Caucus
- Congressional Arts Caucus
- Congressional Western Caucus
- Climate Solutions Caucus
- Problem Solvers Caucus

== Political positions ==
Jenkins had a mostly conservative voting record in Congress. According to the Washington Examiner, "Jenkins, who had originally won her 2008 primary as a moderate, proved to be a fairly reliable conservative vote once she got to Congress (91 percent lifetime ACU rating and 73 percent Heritage Action in the last Congress)." In 2013, the non-partisan National Journal gave Jenkins a score of 77% conservative and 23% liberal.

=== Crime ===
In a 2000 survey from Vote Smart, Jenkins indicated that if elected, she would support the use of the death penalty in Kansas, contracting with private sector firms to build and/or manage state prisons, and prosecuting youth accused of a felony as adults.

=== Energy and environment ===
Jenkins was in favor of the Keystone XL Pipeline, stating that it would create more jobs and enable the United States to compete against China. She supports federal funding for renewable energy.

Jenkins has a zero rating from Environment America regarding her environment-related voting record. She opposes federal regulations of greenhouse gas emissions and considers it government overreach.

=== Gun law ===
Jenkins has an A rating from the NRA Political Victory Fund regarding her gun-related voting record. She supports banning the sale or transfer of semi-automatic guns except those used for hunting. She supports background checks at gun shows.

=== Health care ===
Jenkins supported the repeal and replacement of the Affordable Care Act ("Obamacare").

=== Economic issues ===
Jenkins believes cutting government spending will increase job opportunities and improve the economy.

Jenkins opposes increasing taxes to work towards a balanced budget.

=== Immigration ===
Jenkins has a zero rating from the National Hispanic Leadership Agenda for her immigration-related voting record. Jenkins believes that by "improving" the Mexico–United States border it will be "more difficult for illegal immigrants to obtain and use false identification documents." She supports installing technology and building additional fences along the border. In 2008, Jenkins stated that she is against amnesty for undocumented immigrants. Regarding DACA and the Dreamers, Jenkins released the following statement: "These children did not come to America on their own terms, they simply followed their parents. In the coming weeks, I look forward to working with my colleagues to create a permanent solution through the legislative process with input from Kansans in the 2nd District."

=== Abortion ===
Jenkins described herself as "pro-choice" or pro-abortion rights while running for Congress. She frequently received a zero percent score from NARAL Pro-Choice America and a 100 percent score from the National Right to Life Committee (NRLC) for her voting record on abortion-related legislation. She received mixed ratings from Planned Parenthood and NARAL. Also in 2009, Population Connection, which supports family planning, gave her a 100% score. Her lowest score from NRLC is an 83%, mostly earning a 100% score. She supports abortion when pregnancy results from incest, rape or the woman's life is threatened; asked about Roe v Wade, the decision legalizing abortion, she replied that it was a "constitutional issue" on which she would not take a position. She opposes partial-birth abortions and federal funding for organizations who provide abortions. She supports providing buffer zones around abortion clinics for both protesters to demonstrate and to provide security for patients.

During her 2007-2008 congressional campaign, Jenkins was endorsed by and received campaign contributions from pro-abortion rights Republican PACs, The WISH List and Republican Majority for Choice. The Republican Majority for Choice was among her top 100 contributors in 2010. Jenkins was referred to as "pro-choice" during the campaign and "Jenkins was endorsed by WISH List, a Republican group." In 2014, Jenkins was endorsed by Kansans for Life, an anti-abortion PAC.

=== LGBT issues ===
Jenkins opposed same-sex marriage and supported Kansas legislation to make marriage only between a man and a woman. She considered it government overreach and believed states should be able to decide for themselves. She did support Kansas including sexual orientation in anti-discrimination laws. Jenkins voted against repealing the Don't Ask Don't Tell Policy, to prohibit funds being used against the Defense of Marriage Act, and she voted against prohibiting federal funds from being given to organizations that discriminate based on sexual orientation. She did vote in favor of the 2009-2010 Defense Appropriations bill that expanded hate crime laws to include sexual orientation, and she voted in favor of the Violence Against Women Act Reauthorization of 2013 which prohibited that program's funds from being given to groups that discriminate based on gender identity or sexual orientation. She received a 10% from the Human Rights Campaign, an LGBTQ PAC, in 2010, mostly receiving a 0% during her tenure.

After the Supreme Court allowed a lower court ruling to stand that struck down Kansas' ban on same-sex marriage, Jenkins said that she was going to focus on other issues. "'The Supreme Court has spoken, or not spoken in this situation'", said Jenkins. "'So by default the court says it's not constitutional, so before too long, that will be a law.'" She did not take a position on legislation to ban same-sex marriage as Treasurer.

== Electoral history ==
Kansas House, District 52: Results 1998
Year	Republican	Party	Votes	%	Democratic	Party	Votes	%
1998	Lynn Jenkins	Republican	5,550	63%	Fran Lee	Democratic	3,218	37%

Kansas Senate, District 20: Results 2000
Year	Republican	Party	Votes	%	Democratic	Party	Votes	%
2000	Lynn Jenkins	Republican	20,987	67%	Jim Clark	Democratic	10,187	33%

Kansas Treasurer: Results 2002–2006
Year	Republican	Party	Votes	%	Democratic	Party	Votes	%
2002	Lynn Jenkins	Republican	457,407	56%	Sally Finney	Democratic	354,157	44%
2006	Lynn Jenkins	Republican	516,940	64%	Larry Wilson	Democratic	286,148	36%

Kansas's 2nd congressional district: Results 2008–2016
Year	Republican	Party	Votes	%	Democratic	Party	Votes	%	Third Party	Party	Votes	%	Third Party	Party	Votes	%
2008	Lynn Jenkins	Republican	155,532	51%	Nancy Boyda	Democratic	142,013	46%	Leslie Martin	Reform	5,080	2%	Robert Garrard	Libertarian	4,683	2%
2010	Lynn Jenkins	Republican	130,034	63%	Cheryl Hudspeth	Democratic	66,588	32%	Robert Garrard	Libertarian	9,353	5%				
2012	Lynn Jenkins	Republican	131,950	61%	Tobias Schlingensiepen	Democratic	76,249	35%	Dennis Hawver	Libertarian	9,823	5%				
2014	Lynn Jenkins	Republican	128,742	57%	Marge Wakefield	Democratic	87,153	39%	Christopher Clemmons	Libertarian	9,791	4%				
2016	Lynn Jenkins	Republican	181,228	61%	Britani Potter	Democratic	96,840	33%	James Houston Bales	Libertarian	19,333	6%				

== Personal life ==
Jenkins has two children, Hayley and Hayden, and was married for 25 years. Her husband Scott filed for divorce on Friday, November 7, 2008, shortly after her election to the U.S. House. She is a member of the United Methodist Church.

== See also ==
- Women in the United States House of Representatives

Party political offices
Preceded by Tim Shallenburger	Republican nominee for Treasurer of Kansas; 2002, 2006	Succeeded by Ron Estes
Preceded by Cathy McMorris Rodgers	Vice Chair of the House Republican Conference; 2013–2017	Succeeded by Doug Collins
Political offices
Preceded by Tim Shallenburger	Treasurer of Kansas; 2003–2009	Succeeded by Dennis McKinney
U.S. House of Representatives
Preceded by Nancy Boyda	Member of the U.S. House of Representatives from Kansas's 2nd congressional district 2009–2019	Succeeded by Steve Watkins
U.S. order of precedence (ceremonial)
Preceded by Jim Ryun as Former U.S. Representative	Order of precedence of the United States as Former U.S. Representative	Succeeded by Harley O. Staggers Jr. as Former U.S. Representative
