= 2010 United States House of Representatives elections in Kansas =

- November 2, 2010

All 4 Kansas seats to the United States House of Representatives
	Majority party	Minority party
Party	Republican	Democratic
Last election	3	1
Seats won	4	0
Seat change	▲1	▼1
Popular vote	528,136	274,992
Percentage	63.21%	32.91%
Swing	▲6.10%	▼5.99%

Republican
50–60%
60–70%
70–80%
80–90%
Democratic
50–60%
60–70%

The 2010 congressional elections in Kansas were held on November 2, 2010, and determined who would survive the state of Kansas in the United States House of Representatives. Kansas has four seats in the House, apportioned according to the 2000 United States census. Representatives are elected for two-year terms; the elected served in the 112th Congress from January 3, 2011, until January 3, 2013.

== Overview ==
Results of the 2010 United States House of Representatives elections in Kansas by district:

District	Republican		Democratic		Others		Total		Result
District	Votes	%	Votes	%	Votes	%	Votes	%	Result
District 1	142,281	73.76%	44,068	22.85%	6,537	3.39%	192,886	100%	Republican Hold
District 2	130,034	63.13%	66,588	32.33%	9,353	4.54%	205,975	100%	Republican Hold
District 3	136,246	58.40%	90,193	38.66%	6,846	2.93%	233,285	100%	Republican Gain
District 4	119,575	58.79%	74,143	36.45%	9,665	4.75%	203,383	100%	Republican Hold
Total	528,136	63.21%	274,992	32.91%	32,401	3.88%	835,529	100%	

== District 1 ==
2010 Kansas's 1st congressional district election
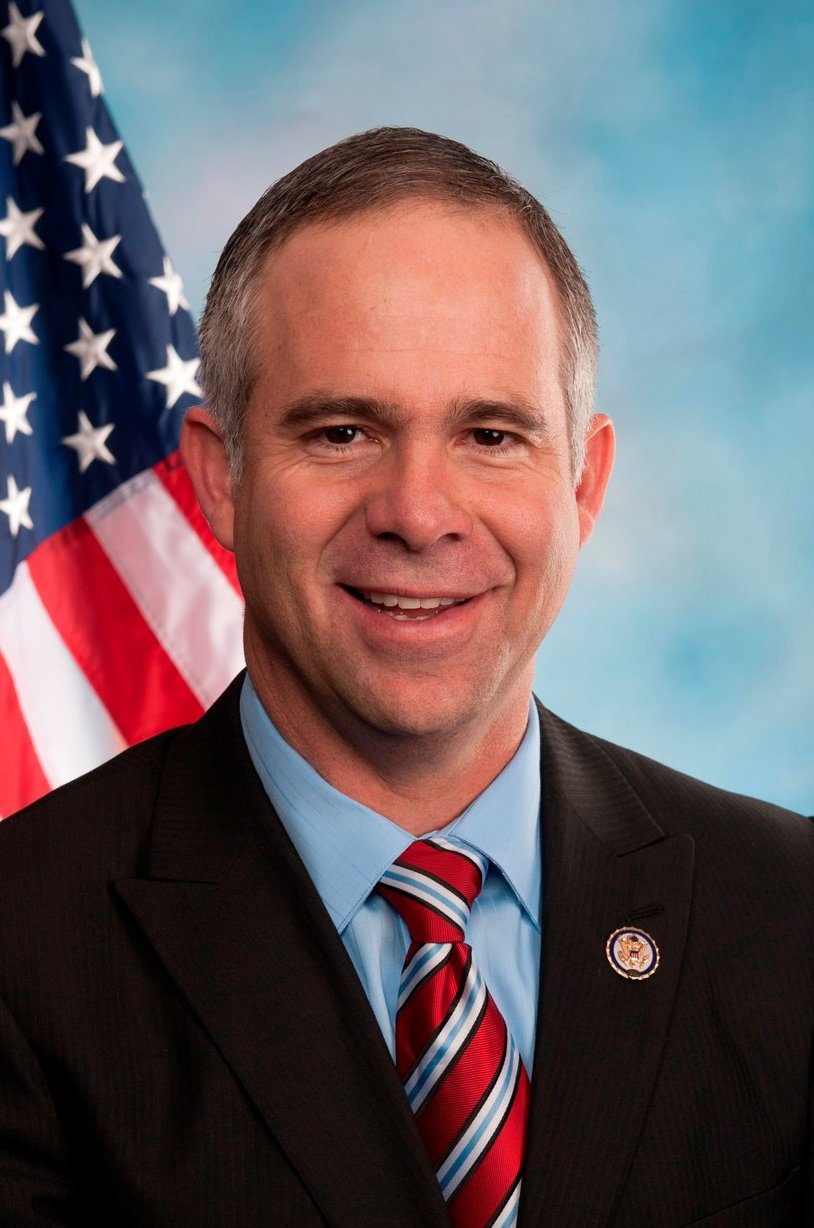

Nominee	Tim Huelskamp	Alan Jilka
Party	Republican	Democratic
Popular vote	142,281	44,068
Percentage	73.8%	22.9%
U.S. Representative before election
Jerry Moran
Republican
Elected U.S. Representative
Tim Huelskamp
Republican

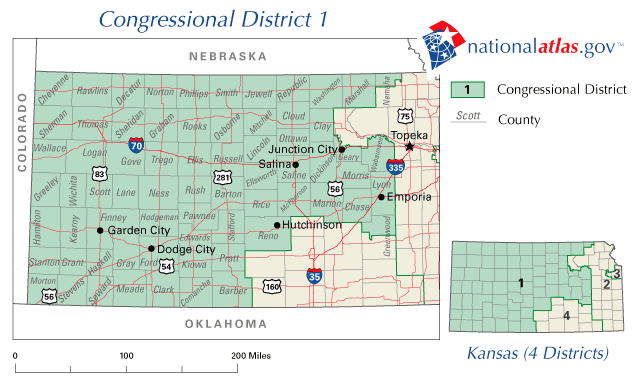

When incumbent Republican Congressman Jerry Moran opted to run for Senate instead of seeking an eighth term in Congress, creating an open seat. Republican State Senator Tim Huelskamp won in a crowded Republican primary that included Jim Barnett, a fellow State Senator and the 2006 Republican nominee for Governor; Rob Wasinger, the former Chief of Staff to retiring Senator Sam Brownback; Sue Boldra, a college instructor; Tracey Mann, a real estate agent; and Monte Shadwick, the former Mayor of Salina. Huelskamp faced Alan Jilka, the Democratic nominee and another former Mayor of Salina and Jack Warner, the Libertarian candidate. As was expected in this solidly conservative district that encompasses almost two-thirds of the state, Huelskamp overwhelmingly defeated Jilka and Warner and won his first term to Congress.

=== Polling ===
Poll Source	Dates Administered	Tim Huelskamp (R)	Alan Jilka (D)	Jack Warner (L)	Undecided
Survey USA	October 5–6, 2010	63%	26%	5%	6%
SurveyUSA	August 5–8, 2010	65%	23%	7%	5%

==== Predictions ====
Source	Ranking	As of
The Cook Political Report	Safe R	November 1, 2010
Rothenberg	Safe R	November 1, 2010
Sabato's Crystal Ball	Safe R	November 1, 2010
RCP	Safe R	November 1, 2010
CQ Politics	Safe R	October 28, 2010
New York Times	Safe R	November 1, 2010
FiveThirtyEight	Safe R	November 1, 2010

=== Results ===
Kansas's 1st congressional district election, 2010
Party	Candidate	Votes	%
Republican	Tim Huelskamp	142,281	73.76
Democratic	Alan Jilka	44,068	22.85
Libertarian	Jack Warner	6,537	3.39
Total votes		192,886	100.00
Republican hold			

==== By county ====
County	Tim Huelskamp Republican		Alan Jilka Democratic		Jack Warner Libertarian		Margin		Total
County	Votes	%	Votes	%	Votes	%	Votes	%	Total
Barber	1,646	80.84%	324	15.91%	66	3.24%	1,322	64.93%	2,036
Barton	6,356	78.19%	1,515	18.64%	258	3.17%	4,841	59.55%	8,129
Chase	774	72.40%	252	23.57%	43	4.02%	522	48.83%	1,069
Cheyenne	935	83.93%	148	13.29%	31	2.78%	787	70.65%	1,114
Clark	740	81.23%	128	14.05%	43	4.72%	612	67.18%	911
Clay	2,328	79.95%	530	18.20%	54	1.85%	1,798	61.74%	2,912
Cloud	2,195	71.99%	771	25.29%	83	2.72%	1,424	46.70%	3,049
Comanche	658	84.04%	100	12.77%	25	3.19%	558	71.26%	783
Decatur	934	80.80%	194	16.78%	28	2.42%	740	64.01%	1,156
Dickinson	4,423	71.59%	1,555	25.17%	200	3.24%	2,868	46.42%	6,178
Edwards	844	79.77%	166	15.69%	48	4.54%	678	64.08%	1,058
Ellis	6,039	70.28%	2,330	27.12%	224	2.61%	3,709	43.16%	8,593
Ellsworth	1,526	68.52%	639	28.69%	62	2.78%	887	39.83%	2,227
Finney	4,839	75.91%	1,303	20.44%	233	3.65%	3,536	55.47%	6,375
Ford	4,597	73.19%	1,336	21.27%	348	5.54%	3,261	51.92%	6,281
Geary	3,055	63.71%	1,580	32.95%	160	3.34%	1,475	30.76%	4,795
Gove	880	81.18%	176	16.24%	28	2.58%	704	64.94%	1,084
Graham	823	76.56%	226	21.02%	26	2.42%	597	55.53%	1,075
Grant	1,459	82.24%	267	15.05%	48	2.71%	1,192	67.19%	1,774
Gray	1,232	78.57%	252	16.07%	84	5.36%	980	62.50%	1,568
Greeley	442	72.34%	147	24.06%	22	3.60%	295	48.28%	611
Greenwood	536	77.79%	124	18.00%	29	4.21%	412	59.80%	689
Hamilton	632	78.80%	132	16.46%	38	4.74%	500	62.34%	802
Haskell	977	85.03%	129	11.23%	43	3.74%	848	73.80%	1,149
Hodgeman	739	81.12%	120	13.17%	52	5.71%	619	67.95%	911
Jewell	867	75.85%	219	19.16%	57	4.99%	648	56.69%	1,143
Kearny	867	82.65%	151	14.39%	31	2.96%	716	68.26%	1,049
Kiowa	903	86.99%	110	10.60%	25	2.41%	793	76.40%	1,038
Lane	605	79.82%	119	15.70%	34	4.49%	486	64.12%	758
Lincoln	858	72.90%	266	22.60%	53	4.50%	592	50.30%	1,177
Logan	929	85.15%	140	12.83%	22	2.02%	789	72.32%	1,091
Lyon	5,180	60.55%	2,998	35.04%	377	4.41%	2,182	25.51%	8,555
Marion	3,386	75.73%	977	21.85%	108	2.42%	2,409	53.88%	4,471
Marshall	2,560	69.55%	959	26.05%	162	4.40%	1,601	43.49%	3,681
McPherson	7,007	73.51%	2,271	23.83%	254	2.66%	4,736	49.69%	9,532
Meade	1,244	83.66%	193	12.98%	50	3.36%	1,051	70.68%	1,487
Mitchell	1,648	74.54%	487	22.03%	76	3.44%	1,161	52.51%	2,211
Morris	1,496	73.15%	472	23.08%	77	3.77%	1,024	50.07%	2,045
Morton	862	86.63%	105	10.55%	28	2.81%	757	76.08%	995
Nemaha	2,127	75.91%	580	20.70%	95	3.39%	1,547	55.21%	2,802
Ness	953	84.86%	131	11.67%	39	3.47%	822	73.20%	1,123
Norton	1,362	78.55%	326	18.80%	46	2.65%	1,036	59.75%	1,734
Osborne	1,229	78.58%	281	17.97%	54	3.45%	948	60.61%	1,564
Ottawa	1,632	75.42%	463	21.40%	69	3.19%	1,169	54.02%	2,164
Pawnee	1,635	75.31%	475	21.88%	61	2.81%	1,160	53.43%	2,171
Phillips	1,607	81.91%	300	15.29%	55	2.80%	1,307	66.62%	1,962
Pratt	2,267	75.49%	624	20.78%	112	3.73%	1,643	54.72%	3,003
Rawlins	980	86.27%	127	11.18%	29	2.55%	853	75.09%	1,136
Reno	12,748	70.19%	4,837	26.63%	577	3.18%	7,911	43.56%	18,162
Republic	1,409	74.91%	418	22.22%	54	2.87%	991	52.68%	1,881
Rice	2,215	75.78%	615	21.04%	93	3.18%	1,600	54.74%	2,923
Rooks	1,649	83.28%	262	13.23%	69	3.48%	1,387	70.05%	1,980
Rush	982	77.63%	232	18.34%	51	4.03%	750	59.29%	1,265
Russell	2,010	75.11%	579	21.64%	87	3.25%	1,431	53.48%	2,676
Saline	10,871	62.02%	5,961	34.01%	697	3.98%	4,910	28.01%	17,529
Scott	1,515	84.64%	221	12.35%	54	3.02%	1,294	72.29%	1,790
Seward	2,781	78.27%	645	18.15%	127	3.57%	2,136	60.12%	3,553
Sheridan	846	81.98%	164	15.89%	22	2.13%	682	66.09%	1,032
Sherman	1,500	78.99%	336	17.69%	63	3.32%	1,164	61.30%	1,899
Smith	1,149	77.06%	305	20.46%	37	2.48%	844	56.61%	1,491
Stafford	1,175	78.75%	269	18.03%	48	3.22%	906	60.72%	1,492
Stanton	493	85.15%	68	11.74%	18	3.11%	425	73.40%	579
Stevens	1,310	87.22%	155	10.32%	37	2.46%	1,155	76.90%	1,502
Thomas	2,055	80.43%	448	17.53%	52	2.04%	1,607	62.90%	2,555
Trego	901	77.87%	212	18.32%	44	3.80%	689	59.55%	1,157
Wabaunsee	1,961	72.74%	599	22.22%	136	5.04%	1,362	50.52%	2,696
Wallace	504	83.44%	85	14.07%	15	2.48%	419	69.37%	604
Washington	1,766	82.56%	322	15.05%	51	2.38%	1,444	67.51%	2,139
Wichita	628	82.63%	117	15.39%	15	1.97%	511	67.24%	760

== District 2 ==
2010 Kansas's 2nd congressional district election
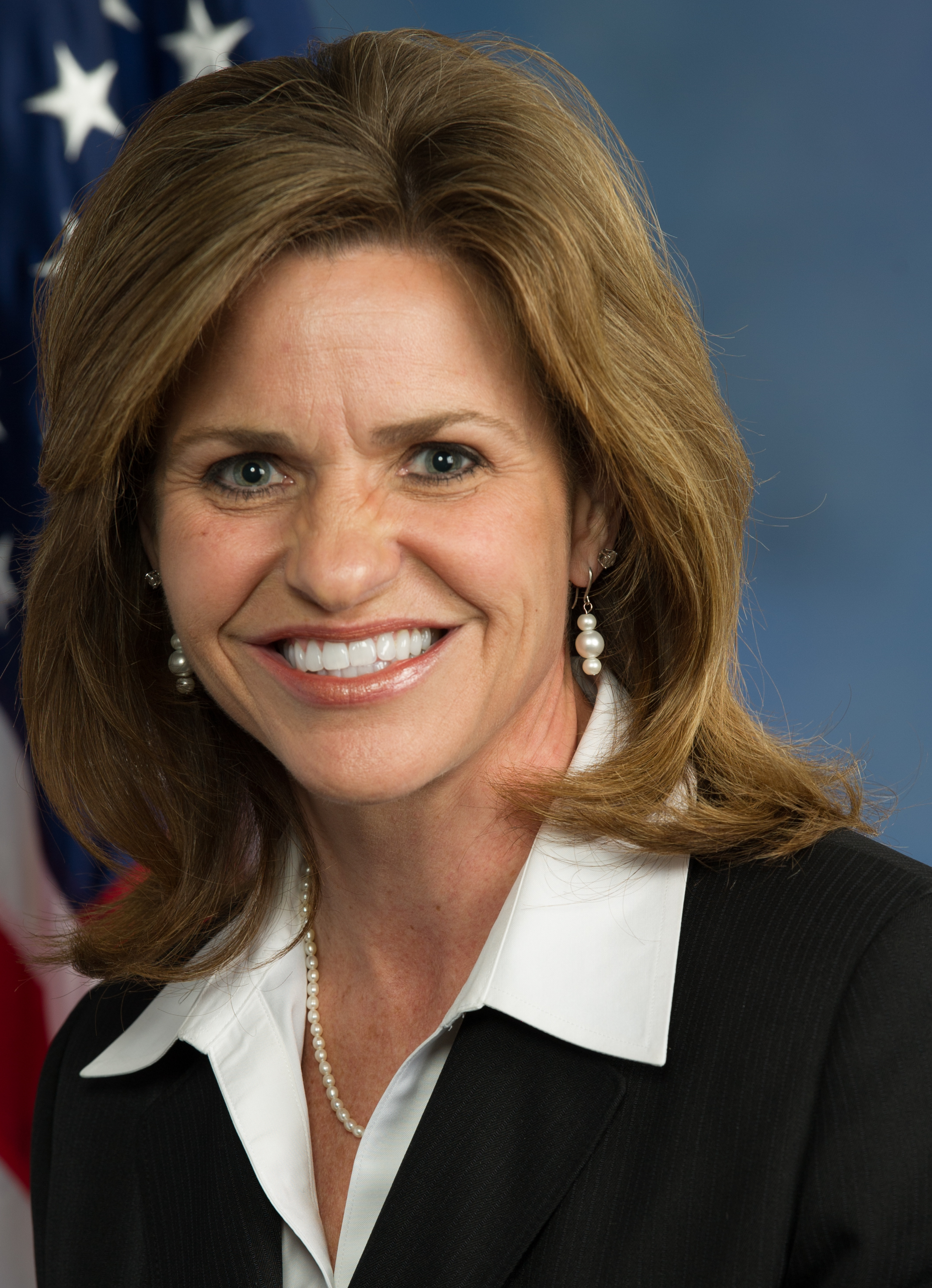

Nominee	Lynn Jenkins	Cheryl Hudspeth
Party	Republican	Democratic
Popular vote	130,034	66,588
Percentage	63.1%	32.3%
- County results Jenkins: 40–50% 50–60% 60–70% 70–80%
U.S. Representative before election
Lynn Jenkins
Republican
Elected U.S. Representative
Lynn Jenkins
Republican

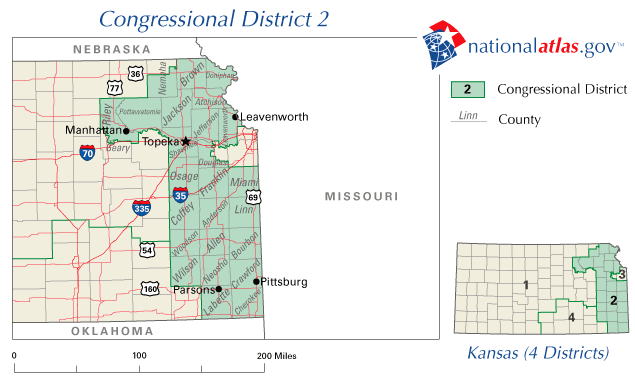

Freshman incumbent Republican Congresswoman Lynn Jenkins, who was initially sent to Congress after defeating previous Congresswoman Nancy Boyda in 2008, was the only member of the Kansas congressional delegation to seek re-election this cycle. This conservative district that consists of most of eastern Kansas normally elects Republicans by large margins, so Congresswoman Jenkins was in no real danger of losing her seat to the Democratic nominee, community organizer Cheryl Hudspeth. Though Democrats hoped to make hay out of Jenkins’ claim that Republicans needed a "great white hope" to challenge President Obama, Jenkins was not vulnerable in the slightest and was overwhelmingly elected to her second term.

=== Predictions ===
Source	Ranking	As of
The Cook Political Report	Safe R	November 1, 2010
Rothenberg	Safe R	November 1, 2010
Sabato's Crystal Ball	Safe R	November 1, 2010
RCP	Safe R	November 1, 2010
CQ Politics	Safe R	October 28, 2010
New York Times	Safe R	November 1, 2010
FiveThirtyEight	Safe R	November 1, 2010

=== Results ===
Kansas's 2nd congressional district election, 2010
Party	Candidate	Votes	%
Republican	Lynn Jenkins (incumbent)	130,034	63.13
Democratic	Cheryl Hudspeth	66,588	32.33
Libertarian	Robert Garrard	9,353	4.54
Total votes		205,975	100.00
Republican hold			

==== By county ====
County	Lynn Jenkins Republican		Cheryl Hudspeth Democratic		Robert Garrard Libertarian		Margin		Total
County	Votes	%	Votes	%	Votes	%	Votes	%	Total
Allen	3,103	69.92%	1,186	26.72%	149	3.36%	1,917	43.20%	4,438
Anderson	1,948	71.83%	595	21.94%	169	6.23%	1,353	49.89%	2,712
Atchison	3,007	64.96%	1,439	31.09%	183	3.95%	1,568	33.87%	4,629
Bourbon	3,462	72.72%	1,146	24.07%	153	3.21%	2,316	48.65%	4,761
Brown	2,194	73.70%	616	20.69%	167	5.61%	1,578	53.01%	2,977
Cherokee	3,964	65.35%	1,877	30.94%	225	3.71%	2,087	34.40%	6,066
Coffey	2,389	79.85%	475	15.88%	128	4.28%	1,914	63.97%	2,992
Crawford	5,946	54.06%	4,667	42.43%	386	3.51%	1,279	11.63%	10,999
Doniphan	1,713	76.75%	415	18.59%	104	4.66%	1,298	58.15%	2,232
Douglas	7,588	49.26%	7,197	46.72%	618	4.01%	391	2.54%	15,403
Franklin	5,324	70.53%	1,748	23.16%	477	6.32%	3,576	47.37%	7,549
Geary	24	77.42%	7	22.58%	0	0.00%	17	54.84%	31
Jackson	2,804	66.12%	1,224	28.86%	213	5.02%	1,580	37.26%	4,241
Jefferson	4,019	64.97%	1,864	30.13%	303	4.90%	2,155	34.84%	6,186
Labette	3,789	66.80%	1,691	29.81%	192	3.39%	2,098	36.99%	5,672
Leavenworth	12,572	67.52%	5,298	28.45%	750	4.03%	7,274	39.07%	18,620
Linn	2,480	75.45%	646	19.65%	161	4.90%	1,834	55.80%	3,287
Miami	7,300	73.49%	2,150	21.65%	483	4.86%	597	55.53%	9,933
Nemaha	946	72.99%	281	21.68%	69	5.32%	665	51.31%	1,296
Neosho	3,330	70.02%	1,250	26.28%	176	3.70%	2,080	43.73%	4,756
Osage	3,706	66.50%	1,472	26.41%	395	7.09%	2,234	40.09%	5,573
Pottawatomie	5,001	74.54%	1,335	19.90%	373	5.56%	3,666	54.64%	6,709
Riley	8,770	62.99%	4,570	32.83%	582	4.18%	4,200	30.17%	13,922
Shawnee	31,662	55.42%	22,723	39.77%	2,748	4.81%	8,939	15.65%	57,133
Wilson	2,155	79.67%	455	16.82%	95	3.51%	1,700	62.85%	2,705
Jewell	838	72.68%	261	22.64%	54	4.68%	577	50.04%	1,153

== District 3 ==
2010 Kansas's 3rd congressional district election

Nominee	Kevin Yoder	Stephene Moore
Party	Republican	Democratic
Popular vote	136,246	90,193
Percentage	58.4%	38.7%
U.S. Representative before election
Dennis Moore
Democratic
Elected U.S. Representative
Kevin Yoder
Republican

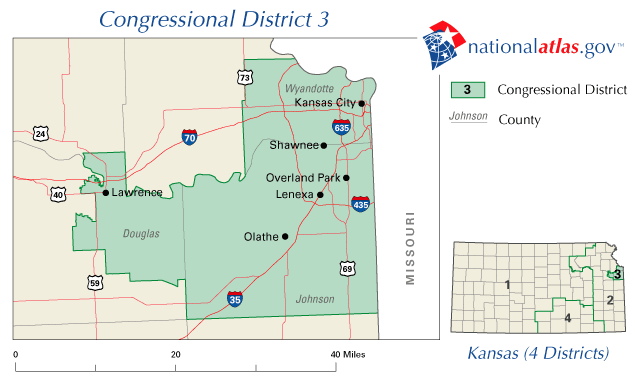

This conservative-leaning district, which is based in the Kansas City metropolitan area and the college town of Lawrence, has been represented by Democratic Congressman Dennis Moore since he was first elected in 1998. This year, however, Moore declined to seek a seventh term to Congress, calling for a "new generation of leadership." On the Republican side, Kevin Yoder won the primary to became the Republican nominee; while Stephene Moore, a nurse and the wife of the retiring Congressman, won the Democratic nomination. Though the race was marked by sharp disagreement between Yoder and Moore on matters such as cap-and-trade and international outsourcing American jobs, Yoder won the election with a 20-point margin of victory. This was Yoder's first of four congressional election victories.

=== Predictions ===
Source	Ranking	As of
The Cook Political Report	Likely R (flip)	November 1, 2010
Rothenberg	Likely R (flip)	November 1, 2010
Sabato's Crystal Ball	Likely R (flip)	November 1, 2010
RCP	Likely R (flip)	November 1, 2010
CQ Politics	Likely R (flip)	October 28, 2010
New York Times	Safe R (flip)	November 1, 2010
FiveThirtyEight	Safe R (flip)	November 1, 2010

=== Results ===
Kansas's 3rd congressional district election, 2010
Party	Candidate	Votes	%
Republican	Kevin Yoder	136,246	58.40
Democratic	Stephene Moore	90,193	38.66
Libertarian	Jasmin Talbert	6,846	2.93
Total votes		233,285	100.00
Republican gain from Democratic			

==== By county ====
County	Kevin Yoder Republican		Stephene Moore Democratic		Jasmin Talbert Libertarian		Margin		Total
County	Votes	%	Votes	%	Votes	%	Votes	%	Total
Douglas	6,018	34.88%	10,575	61.30%	659	3.82%	-4,557	-26.41%	17,252
Johnson	118,876	64.74%	59,858	32.60%	4,899	2.67%	59,018	32.14%	183,633
Wyandotte	11,352	35.04%	19,760	60.99%	1,288	3.98%	-8,408	-25.95%	32,400

== District 4 ==
2010 Kansas's 4th congressional district election

Nominee	Mike Pompeo	Raj Goyle
Party	Republican	Democratic
Popular vote	119,575	74,143
Percentage	58.8%	36.5%
U.S. Representative before election
Todd Tiahrt
Republican
Elected U.S. Representative
Mike Pompeo
Republican

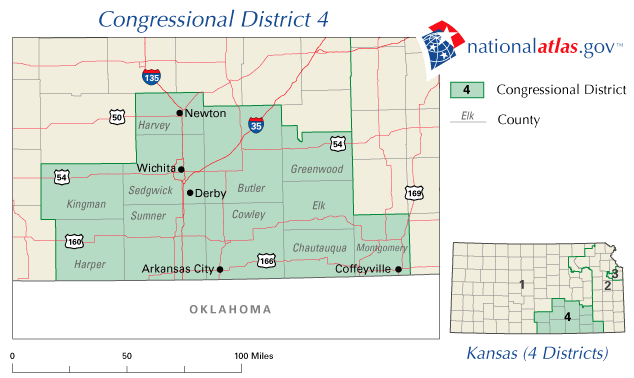

Based around metro Wichita and rural counties in the south-central region of Kansas, this conservative district has been represented by Republican Congressman Todd Tiahrt since he was first elected in the Republican Revolution of 1994. This year, though, Congressman Tiahrt declined to seek a ninth term and opted to run for U.S. Senate instead. In the Republican primary, businessman Mike Pompeo edged out several rivals, including State Senator Jean Schodorf and businessman Wink Hartman. State Representative Raj Goyle, who raised eyebrows when he was elected to represent a conservative area in the Kansas House of Representatives, became the Democratic nominee. The general election was contentious, and sparks flew when the Pompeo campaign tweeted a link to a controversial blog that referred to Goyle as "just another 'turban topper' we don’t need in Congress or any political office that deals with the U.S. Constitution, Christianity, and the United States of America!" The tweet, recommending the piece as a "good read", led to an apology from Pompeo. The Goyle camp attacked Pompeo for what they called "bigoted attacks" when a supporter of the Republican candidate sponsored billboards that said "Vote American, [v]ote Pompeo" and "True Americans vote for Pompeo." Pompeo went on to defeat Goyle, 59%-36%.

=== Polling ===
Poll source	Dates administered	Mike Pompeo (R)	Raj Goyle (D)	David Moffett/Shawn Smith* (L)	Undecided
Survey USA	October 25–28, 2010	54%	38%	2%*	2%
Cole Hargrave	October 10–11, 2010	48%	31%	-	-
Survey USA	October 6–7, 2010	53%	40%	2%*	3%
Survey USA	September 14–15, 2010	50%	40%	3%	4%
Gerstein Agne	September 8–9, 2010	46%	46%	-	-
Gerstein Agne	August 10–12, 2010	50%	47%	-	-
Survey USA	August 9–11, 2010	49%	42%	4%	5%

==== Predictions ====
Source	Ranking	As of
The Cook Political Report	Safe R	November 1, 2010
Rothenberg	Safe R	November 1, 2010
Sabato's Crystal Ball	Safe R	November 1, 2010
RCP	Safe R	November 1, 2010
CQ Politics	Safe R	October 28, 2010
New York Times	Safe R	November 1, 2010
FiveThirtyEight	Safe R	November 1, 2010

=== Results ===
Kansas's 4th congressional district election, 2010
Party	Candidate	Votes	%
Republican	Mike Pompeo	119,575	58.79
Democratic	Raj Goyle	74,143	36.45
Reform	Susan G. Ducey	5,041	2.48
Libertarian	Shawn Smith	4,624	2.27
Total votes		203,383	100.00
Republican hold			

==== By county ====
County	Mike Pompeo Republican		Raj Goyle Democratic		Susan G. Ducey Reform		Shawn Smith Libertarian		Margin		Total
County	Votes	%	Votes	%	Votes	%	Votes	%	Votes	%	Total
Butler	13,308	63.64%	6,473	30.95%	612	2.93%	519	2.48%	6,835	32.68%	20,912
Chautauqua	1,010	78.54%	204	15.86%	40	3.11%	32	2.49%	806	62.67%	1,286
Cowley	5,786	57.11%	3,856	38.06%	230	2.27%	260	2.57%	1,930	19.05%	10,132
Elk	756	66.49%	307	27.00%	38	3.34%	36	3.17%	449	39.49%	1,137
Greenwood	1,017	62.62%	486	29.93%	52	3.20%	69	4.25%	531	32.70%	1,624
Harper	1,373	65.19%	600	28.49%	66	3.13%	67	3.18%	773	36.70%	2,106
Harvey	6,597	57.51%	4,362	38.03%	283	2.47%	229	2.00%	2,235	19.48%	11,471
Kingman	1,801	67.18%	686	25.59%	111	4.14%	83	3.10%	1,115	41.59%	2,681
Montgomery	6,802	73.60%	2,030	21.96%	213	2.30%	197	2.13%	4,772	51.63%	9,242
Sedgwick	76,548	56.69%	52,475	38.86%	3,101	2.30%	2,897	2.15%	24,073	17.83%	135,021
Sumner	4,577	58.90%	2,664	34.28%	295	3.80%	235	3.02%	1,913	24.62%	7,771
