= Survival Condo =

Underground bunker in Kansas

The Survival Condo or Luxury Survival Condo Project is a company and real estate property in Kansas, which has converted an Atlas ICBM missile silo into a 15-story underground bunker.

== Raven 11 history ==
Owner Laurence "Larry" A. Hall Jr. (described as "a burly Willy Wonka") purchased the Raven Ridge 11 Atlas missile silo at Raven Ridge near Concordia, Kansas (39.4119444°N 97.6805556°W) in 2008 for $300,000. It is 197 feet (60 m) in depth, which he built into a 15-floor bunker complete with tilapia aquaponic facility, vegetable gardens, mini grocery store, swimming pool, theater, library, gym, sauna and steam room, jail cell, climbing wall, bar, three years of stockpiled food, and 12 condo units for up to 75 people. The development was completed by 2012 at a cost of $20 million.

The facility also contains a shooting range, three armories, decontamination room, volcanic ash remover, reverse osmosis water filtration, and a remote-controlled .223 rifle (with a fully automated mode) in a sniper post atop the facility to defend the bunker. It also has at least two armored vehicles including a Pit-Bull VX tactical truck, typically used as a SWAT vehicle. It also has small apartments for an undisclosed number of employees, such as maintenance and medical staff.

The vice president of business development is Bill Craig.

=== Owners ===
While owners may occupy units at any time, in 2020 none were doing so. Hall has stated all 12 units had been sold in 2014 and 2017, though 6 appeared for sale in 2020. Owners include:

- Nik Halik
- Tyler Allen, real estate developer from Florida
- A woman from New York City who has also contributed 2600 bottles of wine to the bar
- Peter Ziegler until 2017 (see below)
- Robert David Harris MD, Unit 7S (see below)
- Larry Hall, facility owner, also owns a condo in the development, Unit 7N

==== Peter Ziegler ====
In 2013, Peter Ziegler, (son of William Ziegler III, grandson of William Ziegler Jr.) purchased Unit 5 and also loaned $3 million to LAH Cubed with a promissory note, due one year later. Ziegler died in 2017. The estate formally demanded the funds, which were in default by late 2018. Shortly after, Hall's LAH Cubed transferred assets to other LLCs in his name. The estate filed in January 2019 to pierce the corporate veil as Hall/LAH Cubed had transferred assets to other LLCs. In a May 2019 response, LAH Cubed stated that there was confusion, that Ziegler owed LAH for $5 million in improvements, so the $3 million was partial payment towards that, which satisfied the note, but he died before actually voiding it. LAH also denied any connection between Ziegler and the asset transfers. The parties settled out of court in August 2019.

=== Co-op ===
The facility is owned by the not-for-profit Raven Ridge of Kansas Site 11, Inc., incorporated in 2012. By 2020 the company board contained Larry Hall, Leila Samoodi Centner of Brookville, New York (cofounder of Centner Academy Miami), Lizanne Holland of Westerly, Rhode Island, and Robert D. Harris MD of Snoqualmie, Washington.

== Raven 10 ==
Hall discussed a second silo that was being converted in 2017 as being 25 miles (40 km) away. This Raven 10 facility (39.019515°N 97.850423°W) is in Tescott, Kansas and owned by Raven Ten Development LLC.

== Other projects ==
Hall had options on four other silos in 2017 and was designing private bunkers for clients.

== See also ==
- Presidential Emergency Operations Center
- Pink Visual#Pink Visual Apocalypse Bunker
- Project Greek Island
- Vivos (underground shelter)
- Antonio García Martínez (author)
