= Vivos (underground shelter) =

American survival shelter company

Vivos (also known as The Vivos Group) is a California-based company that built underground shelters designed to withstand future disasters and life-extinction catastrophes. Robert Vicino founded the company.

Shelters 10,000-square-foot (0.093 ha) have been completed in Indiana, 575 bunkers each 2,150 square feet across the Black Hills Ordnance Depot, a former military base in South Dakota, and others are in the process of construction. As of September 2022, Vicino stated that the company has approximately 100,000 members, of whom more than 1,000 have bought space in one or more of the Vivos shelters.

== History ==
The first completed shelter, located in Indiana, was built during the Cold War to withstand a near direct hit from a 20-megaton nuclear bomb. With accommodations for 80 people, the Indiana complex has a few spots left due to member relocations and family changes.

Vivos plans to convert a surplus Cold War Soviet-built underground complex of 250,000 square feet (2.3 ha) located in Rothenstein, Germany, into a luxury shelter to house up to 1,000 people, a small zoo, storage for cultural treasures, and a gene bank for reconstituting plants and animals after a possible extinction event. Fire safety regulations were expected to present a problem for the project requiring a fire sprinkler system throughout the facility.

In 2013, Vivos acquired the purchase rights to a large portion of the Atchison Storage Facility, a 2,700,000-square-foot (25 ha) former limestone mine in Atchison, Kansas, formerly owned by the US Army, and announced plans to convert it into "the world's largest private underground survivor shelter", housing 5,000 people. In June 2014, Vivos cancelled the Kansas project due to Army geologists' concerns about the structural stability of the former limestone mine, having experienced a number of dome out collapses of the limestone.

Vivos Group acquired a property of 1967-built shelters in Fall River County, United States, in 2016 and repurposed it. Each bunker is either 60 x 26.5 feet (18.29 meters x 8 meters), or 80 feet × 26.5 feet (24.4 meters × 8 meters).
