= Tom Brokaw =

American broadcast journalist and author (born 1940)

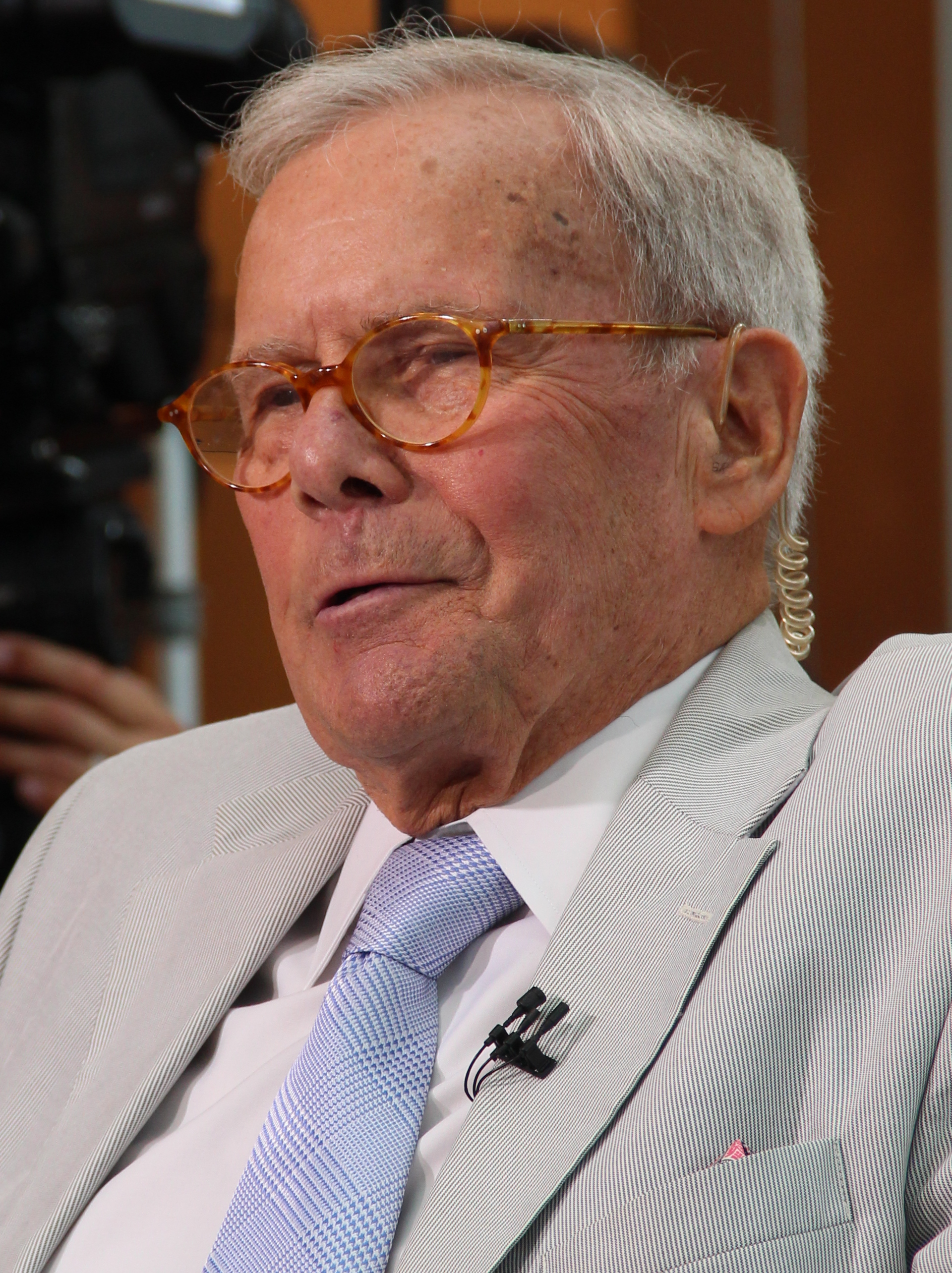
- Brokaw in 2015
- Born: Thomas John Brokaw; February 6, 1940 (age 86); Webster, South Dakota, U.S.
- Education: University of South Dakota (BA)
- Occupations: Television journalist; author
- Years active: 1960–2021
- Employer: NBC (1966–2021)
- Notable credits: Today co-anchor (1976–1981); NBC Nightly News anchor (1982–2004); NBC News Special Correspondent (2004–2021); Meet the Press moderator (2008)
- Term: Anchor of NBC Nightly News
- Predecessor: John Chancellor
- Successor: Brian Williams
- Spouse: Meredith Auld (m. 1962)
- Children: 3

Signature
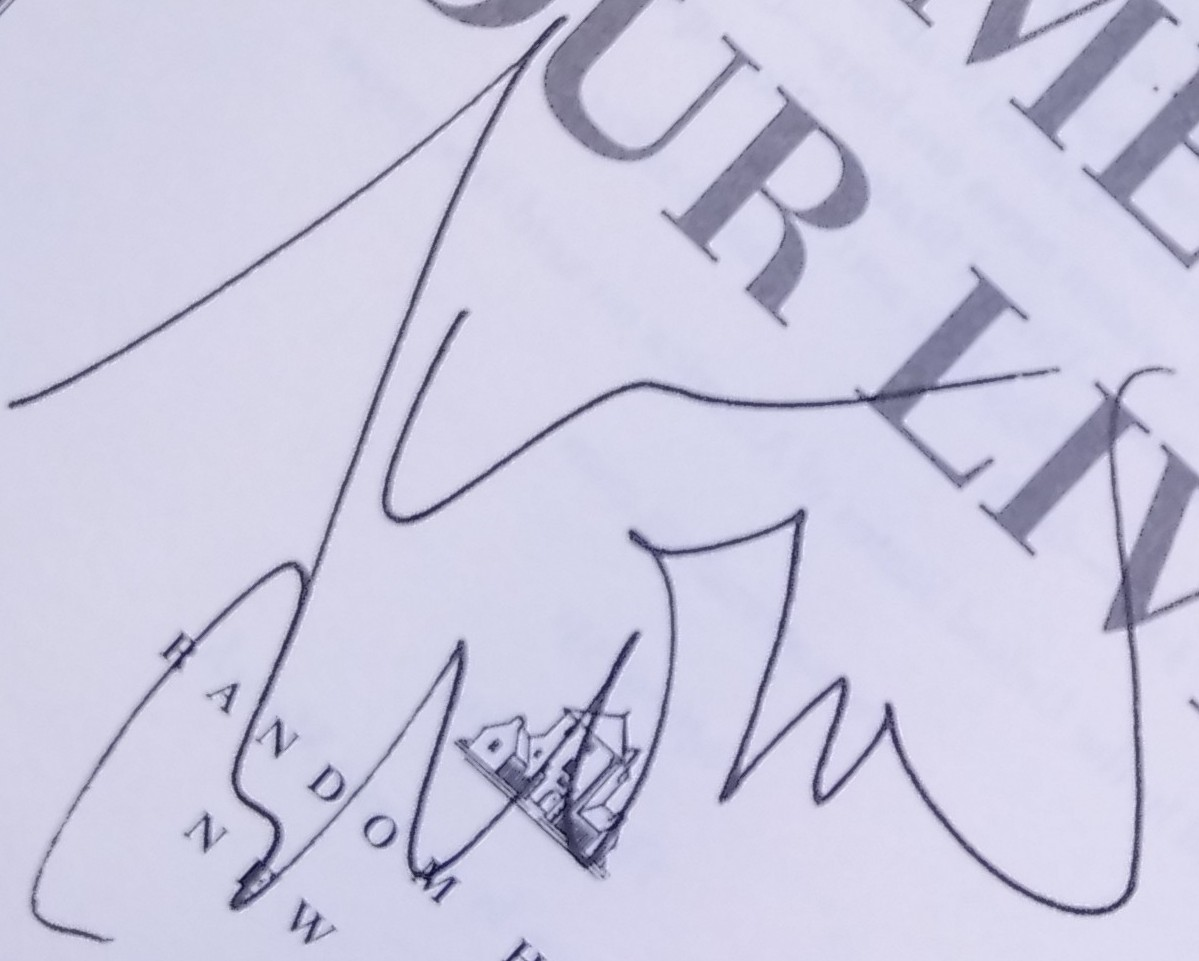

Thomas John Brokaw (/ˈbroʊkɔː/; born February 6, 1940) is an American author and retired network television journalist. He first served as the co-anchor of The Today Show from 1976 to 1981 with Jane Pauley, then as the anchor and managing editor of NBC Nightly News for 22 years (1982–2004). In the previous decade he served as a weekend anchor for the program from 1973 to 1976. He is the only person to have hosted all three major NBC News programs: The Today Show, NBC Nightly News, and, briefly, Meet the Press. He formerly held a special correspondent post for NBC News.

Along with his competitors Peter Jennings at ABC News, and Dan Rather at CBS News, Brokaw was one of the "Big Three" American news anchors during the 1980s, 1990s and early 2000s. All three hosted their networks' flagship nightly news programs for more than 20 years. (Note: They began and retired from their anchor chairs (or died, in Jennings' case) within a year of each other.)

Brokaw has also written several books on American history and society in the 20th century including The Greatest Generation (1998). He occasionally writes and narrates documentaries for other outlets. In 2021, NBC announced that Brokaw would retire after 55 years at the network, one of the longest standing anchors in the world at the same news network. (Note: along with Ecuadorian news anchor Alfonso Espinosa de los Monteros who has been in Ecuavisa since 1967.)

Brokaw is the recipient of numerous awards and honors including the two Peabody Awards; two Emmy Awards; the Presidential Medal of Freedom, which was awarded to him by President Barack Obama in 2014; and the French Legion of Honor in 2016.

== Early life ==
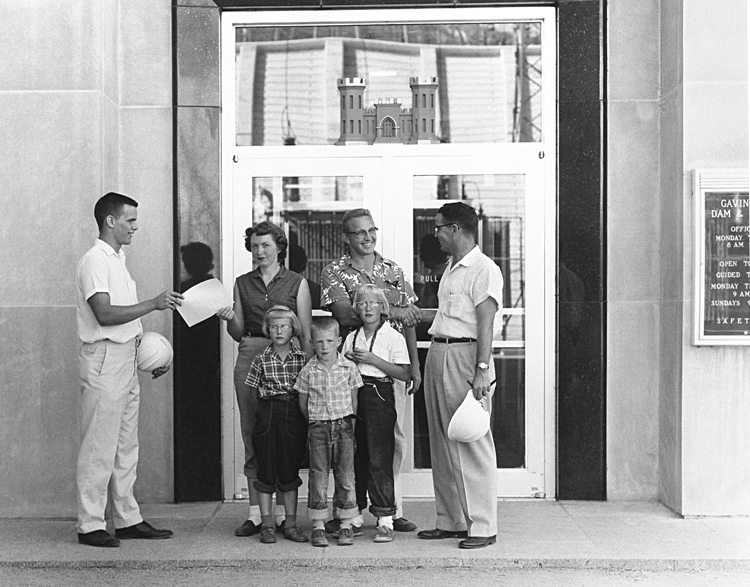
Brokaw (left) greeting the 20,000th visitor to the Gavins Point Dam in 1958; Brokaw was a tour guide there.

Brokaw was born in Webster, South Dakota, the son of Eugenia "Jean" (née Conley; 1917–2011), who worked in sales and as a post office clerk, and Anthony Orville "Red" Brokaw (1912–1982). He was the eldest of their three sons (brothers named William and Michael) and named for his maternal great-grandfather, Thomas Conley.

His father was a descendant of Huguenot immigrants Bourgon and Catherine (née Le Fèvre) Broucard, and his mother was Irish American. His paternal great-grandfather, Richard P. Brokaw, founded the town of Bristol, South Dakota, and the Brokaw House, a small hotel and the first structure in Bristol.

Brokaw's father was a construction foreman for the Army Corps of Engineers. He worked at the Black Hills Ordnance Depot (BHOD) and helped construct Fort Randall Dam; his job often required the family to resettle throughout South Dakota during Brokaw's early childhood. The Brokaws lived for short periods in Bristol, Igloo (the small residential community of the BHOD), and Pickstown, before settling in Yankton, where Brokaw attended high school.

As a high school student attending Yankton Senior High School, Brokaw was the governor of the school's America Legion Boys State chapter, and in that capacity he accompanied then-South Dakota Governor Joe Foss to New York City for a joint appearance on a TV game show. It was to be the beginning of a long relationship with Foss, whom Brokaw would later feature in his book about World War II veterans, The Greatest Generation. Brokaw also became an advisory board member of the Joe Foss Institute.

Brokaw matriculated at the University of Iowa in Iowa City, Iowa, but dropped out after a year as he apparently failed to keep up in his studies, in his words majoring in "beer and co-eds". He later transferred to the University of South Dakota, where he graduated Phi Beta Kappa in 1962 with a Bachelor of Arts degree in political science. In 2010, he was awarded an honorary doctorate from the University of Iowa, and later donated his papers to its library. He joked that the "honorary degree is especially coveted because it helps to make up for the uneven (to put it mildly) performance of my freshman year."

For several years, Brokaw mountain-climbed with the "Do Boys", whose members included Yvon Chouinard and Douglas Tompkins. He owned a home on 53 acres in Pound Ridge, New York, for over two decades.

== Broadcasting career ==
=== 1966–1981: early years ===
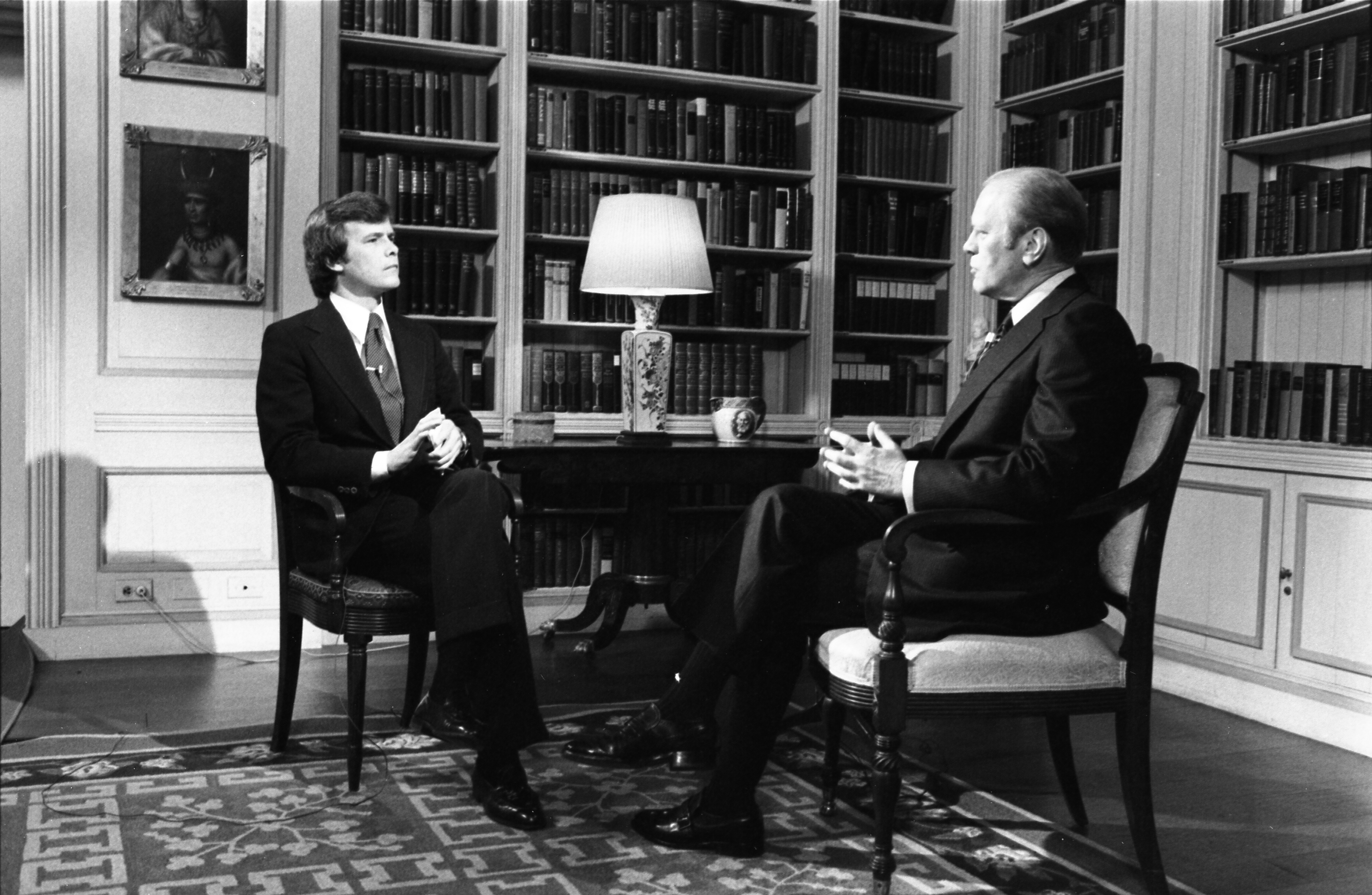
Brokaw interviewing President Gerald Ford in 1976

Brokaw's television career began at KTIV in Sioux City, Iowa, followed by stints at KMTV in Omaha, Nebraska, and WSB-TV in Atlanta. In 1966, he joined NBC News, reporting from Los Angeles and anchoring the 11:00 p.m. news for KNBC. In 1973, NBC made Brokaw White House correspondent, covering the Watergate scandal, and anchor of the Saturday editions of Nightly News. He became co-host (with Jane Pauley) of NBC's Today Show in 1976 and remained in the job until 1981, when he was succeeded by Bryant Gumbel.

Brokaw kept a closely guarded secret for many years: in 2017 Brokaw wrote of having been offered – and having promptly turned down – the press secretary position in the Nixon White House in 1969. While living in California before Nixon made his political comeback, Brokaw had come to know H. R. 'Bob' Haldeman (White House chief of staff and initiator of the offer) as well as Nixon's press secretary, Ron Ziegler, and others members of the White House staff.

In 2019, Brokaw wrote a book entitled The Fall of Richard Nixon: A Reporter Remembers Watergate, about his experiences working as a reporter and member of the White House press corps.

=== 1982–2004: NBC Nightly News ===
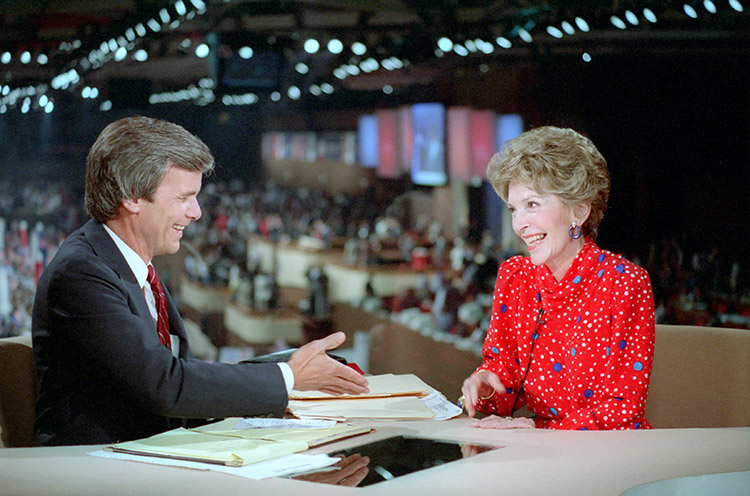
Brokaw with Nancy Reagan at the Republican National Convention in August 1984

On April 5, 1982, Brokaw began co-anchoring NBC Nightly News from New York with Roger Mudd in Washington, succeeding John Chancellor. After a year, NBC News president Reuven Frank concluded that the dual-anchor program was not working and selected Brokaw to be sole anchor. The NBC Nightly News with Tom Brokaw commenced on September 5, 1983. Among other news items, he covered the Challenger disaster, EDSA Revolution, the June Struggle, Loma Prieta earthquake, fall of the Berlin Wall, and Hurricane Andrew.

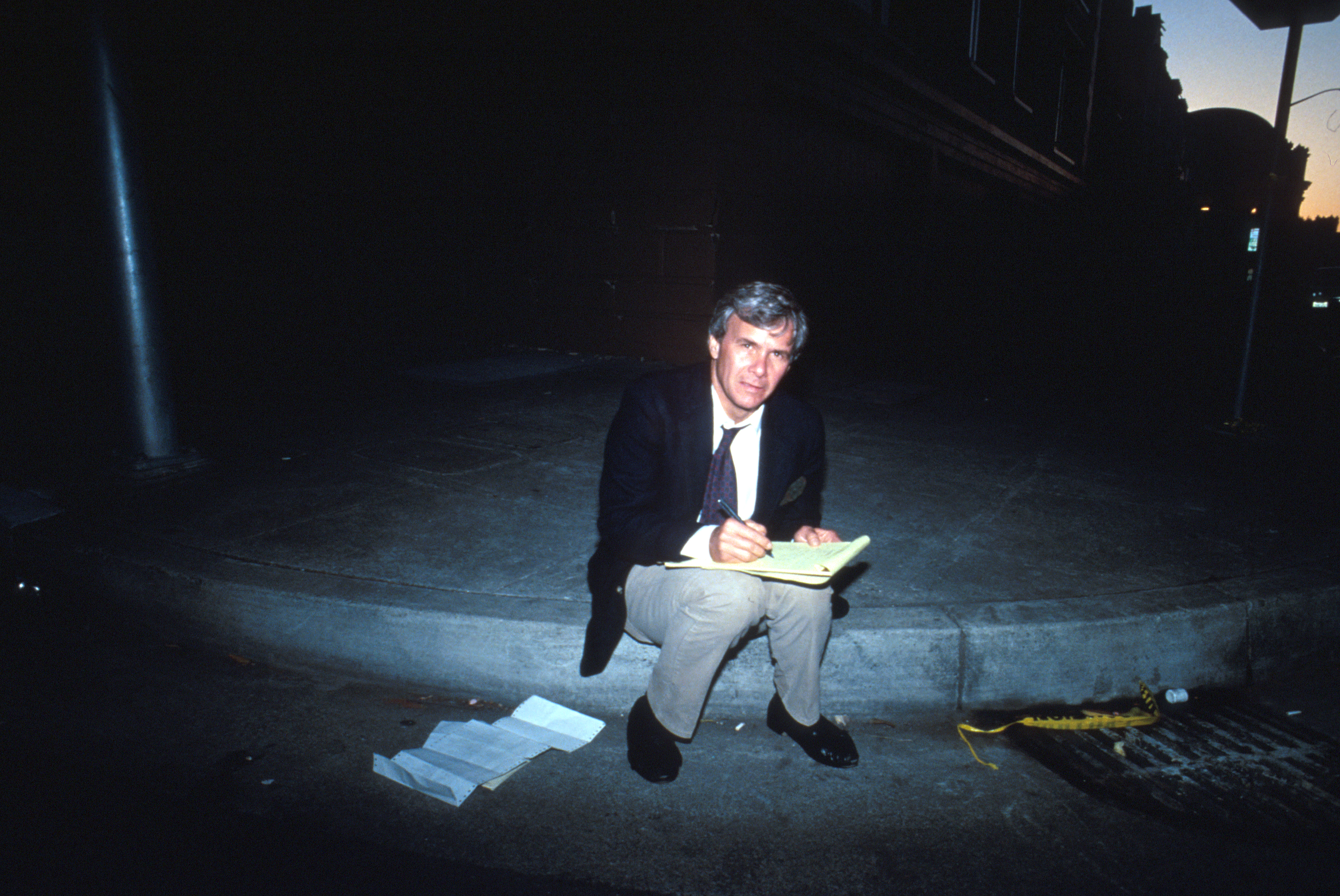
Brokaw preparing for a live broadcast in the aftermath of the 1989 Loma Prieta earthquake

Brokaw scored a major coup when, on November 9, 1989, he was the first English-language broadcast journalist to report the Fall of the Berlin Wall. Brokaw attended a televised press conference organized in East Berlin by Günter Schabowski, press spokesman for East German Politburo, which had just decided to allow its citizens to apply to permanently leave the country through its border with West Germany. When Schabowski was asked when this loosening of regulations would take effect, he glanced through his notes, then said, "sofort, unverzüglich" ("immediately, without delay"), touching off a stampede of East Berliners to the Wall. Brokaw had an interview with Schabowski after the press conference, who repeated his "immediately" statement when pressed. Later that evening Brokaw reported from the west side of Brandenburg Gate on this announcement and the pandemonium that had broken out in East Berlin because of it.

As anchor, Brokaw conducted the first one-on-one American television interviews with Soviet leader Mikhail Gorbachev and Russian President Vladimir Putin. He and Katie Couric hosted a prime-time newsmagazine, Now, that aired from 1993 to 1994 before being folded into the multi-night Dateline NBC program.

Also, in 1993, on the first broadcast of Late Show with David Letterman on CBS, in response to David Letterman's monologue containing jokes about NBC, Brokaw walked on stage in a surprise appearance (accompanied by Paul Shaffer and the CBS Orchestra playing the NBC Nightly News theme). He congratulated Letterman on his new show and wished him well, but also stated he was disappointed and shocked; he subsequently walked over to the man holding the cue cards, took two, and remarked, "These last two jokes are the intellectual property of NBC!", leaving the stage afterwards. Letterman then remarked, "Who would have thought you would ever hear the words 'intellectual property' and 'NBC' in the same sentence?"

In 1996 Brokaw made the following statement about Richard Jewell's suspected involvement in the 1996 Olympic Park bombing, after which Jewell sued NBC News:

The speculation is that the FBI is close to making the case. They probably have enough to arrest [Jewell] right now, probably enough to prosecute him, but you always want to have enough to convict him as well. There are still some holes in this case.

Even though NBC stood by its story, the network agreed to pay Jewell $500,000.

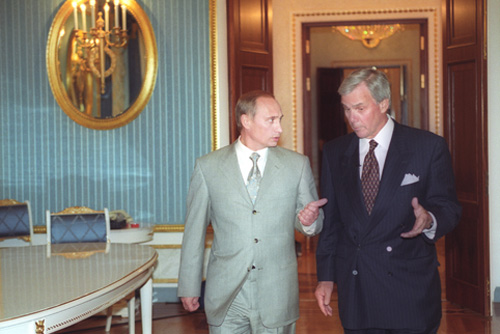
Brokaw with Vladimir Putin before an interview on June 2, 2000

On September 11, 2001, Brokaw joined Katie Couric and Matt Lauer around 9:30 a.m., following the live attack on the South Tower of the World Trade Center, and continued to anchor all day, until after midnight. Following the collapse of the second tower, Brokaw observed: "This is war. This is a declaration and an execution of an attack on the United States." He continued to anchor coverage to midnight on the following two days. Later that month, a letter containing anthrax was addressed to him as part of the 2001 anthrax attacks. Brokaw was not harmed, but two NBC News employees were infected. In 2008, he testified before the Commission on Prevention of Weapons of Mass Destruction Proliferation and Terrorism about the anthrax attacks, publicly discussing his experiences for the first time in a detailed, day-by-day account.

In 2002, NBC announced that Brokaw would retire as anchor of the NBC Nightly News following the 2004 Presidential election, to be succeeded by Brian Williams. Brokaw would remain with NBC News in a part-time capacity from that point onwards, serving as an analyst and anchoring and producing documentary programs. Brokaw closed his final Nightly News broadcast in front of 15.7 million viewers on NBC on December 1, 2004, by saying:

Well the time is here. We've been through a lot together through dark days and nights and seasons of hope and joy. Whatever the story, I had only one objective, to get it right. When I failed, it was personally painful, and there was no greater urgency than course correction. On those occasions, I was grateful for your forbearance and always mindful that your patience and attention didn't come with a lifetime warranty.

I was not alone here, of course. I am simply the most conspicuous part of a large, thoroughly dedicated and professional staff that extends from just beyond these cameras, across the country, and around the world. In too many instances, in places of grave danger and personal hardship and they're family to me.

What have I learned here? More than we have time to recount this evening, but the enduring lessons through the decades are these: it's not the questions that get us in trouble, it's the answers. And just as important, no one person has all the answers.

Just ask a member of the generation that I came to know well, the men and women who came of age in the Great Depression who had great personal sacrifice, saved the world during World War II and returned home to dedicate their lives to improving the nation they had already served so nobly. They weren't perfect, no generation is, but this one left a large and vital legacy of common effort to find common ground here and abroad in which to solve our most vexing problems. They did not give up their personal beliefs and greatest passions, but they never stopped learning from each other and most of all, they did not give up on the idea that we're all in this together, we still are.

And it is in that spirit that I say, thanks, for all that I have learned from you. That's been my richest reward.

That's Nightly News for this Wednesday night. I'm Tom Brokaw. You'll see Brian Williams here tomorrow night, and I'll see you along the way.

By the end of his time as Nightly News anchor, Brokaw was regarded as the most popular news personality in the United States. Nightly News had moved into first place in the Nielsen ratings in late 1996 and held on to the spot for the remainder of Brokaw's tenure on the program, placing him ahead of ABC's Peter Jennings and World News Tonight, and CBS's Dan Rather and the CBS Evening News. Along with Jennings and Rather, Brokaw helped usher in the era of the TV news anchor as a lavishly compensated, globe-trotting star in the 1980s. The magnitude of a news event could be measured by whether Brokaw and his counterparts on the other two networks showed up on the scene. Brokaw's retirement in December 2004, followed by Rather's ousting from the CBS Evening News in March 2005, and Jennings's death in August 2005, brought that era to a close.

=== 2004–2021: after Nightly News ===
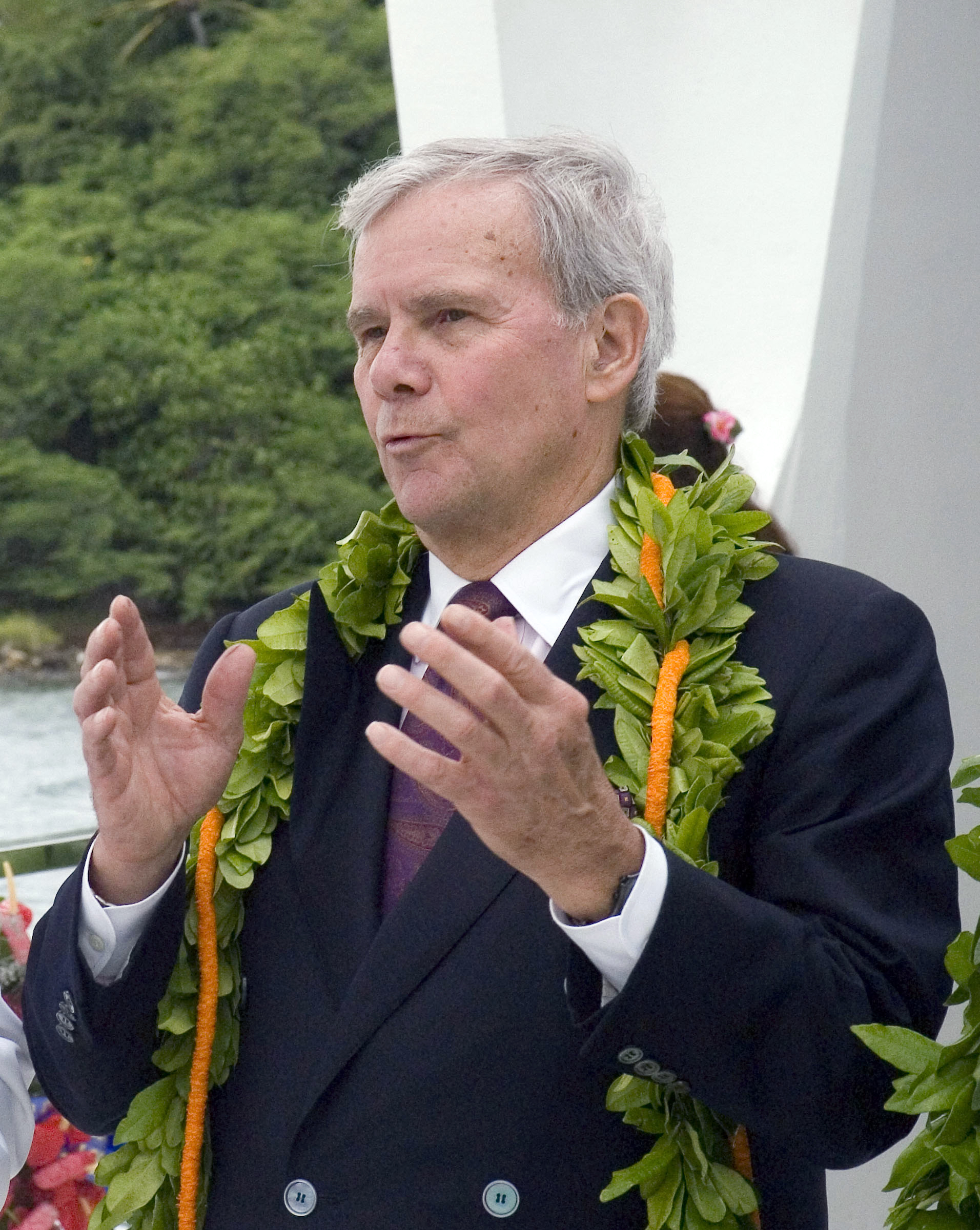
Brokaw in 2006 speaking about the attack on Pearl Harbor

After leaving the anchor chair, Brokaw remained at NBC as Special Correspondent, providing periodic reports for Nightly News. He served as an NBC analyst during the 2008 presidential election campaign and moderated the second presidential debate between Barack Obama and John McCain at Belmont University. He reported documentaries for the Discovery Channel and the History Channel and in 2006 delivered one of the eulogies during the state funeral of former President Gerald R. Ford.

On June 13, 2008, when NBC interrupted its regular programming to announce the sudden death of NBC News Washington Bureau Chief and Meet the Press moderator Tim Russert, Brokaw served as the announcer. A week later, NBC announced that Brokaw would serve as host of Meet the Press on an interim basis. He was succeeded by David Gregory in December 2008.

Brokaw serves on the board of directors of the Council on Foreign Relations, the Committee to Protect Journalists, the International Rescue Committee, and the Mayo Clinic. He is also a member of the Howard University School of Communications Board of Visitors and a trustee of the University of South Dakota, the Norton Simon Museum, the American Museum of Natural History, and the International Rescue Committee. He also provides the voiceover for a University of Iowa advertisement that airs on television during Iowa Hawkeyes athletic events.

In 2011, Brokaw began hosting The Boys in the Hall, a baseball documentary series for Fox Sports Net.

In December 2012, Brokaw starred in the Mormon Tabernacle Choir's annual Christmas concert, with live audiences of 84,000. The concert, titled Home for the Holidays, was nationally televised in December 2013.

In April 2014, a new broadcast facility opened on the Universal Studios Hollywood lot, and named in Brokaw's honor as the Brokaw News Center. The facility houses KNBC-TV, Telemundo owned-and-operated station KVEA, and the Los Angeles bureau of NBC News.

In November 2014, President Barack Obama presented Brokaw with the Presidential Medal of Freedom, America's highest civilian honor. He received the honor with the citation, "The chronicler of the Greatest Generation...we celebrate him as one of our nation’s greatest journalists".

On March 11, 2016, Brokaw gave one of the eulogies for former First Lady Nancy Reagan at her funeral. He spoke about his relationship with both the Reagans as a reporter and later anchor.

On January 22, 2021, NBC announced Brokaw would retire after 55 years at the network, one of only two news anchors in the world who have spent the longest time on the same news network, along with Ecuadorian news anchor Alfonso Espinosa de los Monteros who was on Ecuavisa for over 56 years from 1967 to May 2023.

== Personal life ==
Since 1962, Brokaw has been married to author Meredith Lynn Auld. They have three daughters: Jennifer, Andrea, and Sarah. Brokaw and his wife spend considerable time at their ranch near Livingston, Montana, which they bought in 1989.

On September 6, 2012, Brokaw was hospitalized after appearing on MSNBC's Morning Joe. He later tweeted that he was "all well" and explained his illness as having accidentally taken half a dose of Ambien in the morning. He was diagnosed with multiple myeloma, a treatable but incurable blood cancer, in August 2013 at the Mayo Clinic. Brokaw and his physicians were "very encouraged with his progress". He continued to work for NBC throughout his treatments. On December 21, 2014, Brokaw announced that his cancer is in remission. His 2015 book, A Lucky Life Interrupted: A Memoir of Hope (published by Random House), was about his cancer battle.

In 2018, Brokaw was accused of having made unwanted sexual advances toward two women in the 1990s. Brokaw denied the allegations. In response to the allegations, former colleagues Rachel Maddow, Andrea Mitchell, Maria Shriver, Kelly O'Donnell, and 64 others, signed a letter characterizing Brokaw as "a man of tremendous decency and integrity".

== Career timeline ==
- 1960–1962: KTIV-TV Newscaster, weatherman, and staff announcer
- 1962–1965: KMTV-TV Reporter
- 1965: Anchor of WSB-TV late-evening news
- 1966–2021: NBC News
  - 1966–1972: NBC News West Coast correspondent and KNBC anchor
  - 1973–1976: White House correspondent and Saturday anchor of NBC Nightly News
  - 1976–1981: Today Show co-anchor
  - 1982–1983: NBC Nightly News co-anchor
  - 1983–2004: NBC Nightly News anchor
  - 2004–2021: Special correspondent
  - 2004–2021: Contributing anchor
  - 2008: Meet the Press moderator (interim)

== Bibliography ==
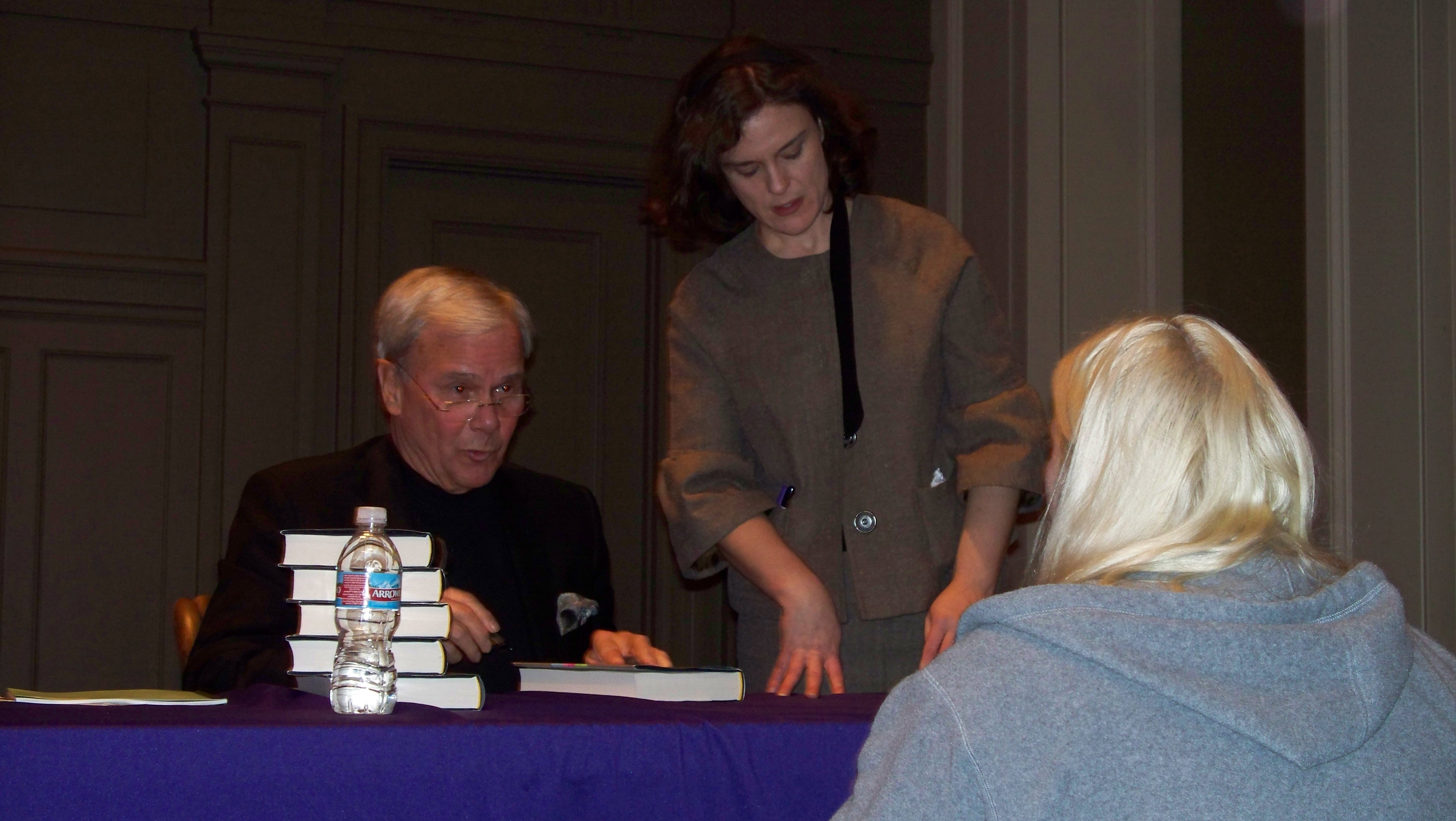
Brokaw signing a book in Seattle in 2007

- 1998 The Greatest Generation ISBN 0-375-50202-5 (hardback) ISBN 0-385-33462-1 (paperback) depicting the Americans who came of age during the Great Depression and fought World War II;
- 1999 The Greatest Generation Speaks: Letters and Reflections ISBN 0-375-50394-3 (hardback) ISBN 0-385-33538-5 (paperback);
- 2001 An Album of Memories: Personal Histories from the Greatest Generation ISBN 0-375-50581-4 (hardback) ISBN 0-375-76041-5 (paperback);
- 2002 A Long Way from Home: Growing Up in the American Heartland ISBN 0-375-50763-9 (hardback) ISBN 0-375-75935-2 (paperback);
- 2006 Galen Rowell: A Retrospective ISBN 1-57805-115-0 (hardback) Foreword by Tom Brokaw;
- 2007 Boom!: Voices of the Sixties Personal Reflections on the '60s and Today ISBN 1-4000-6457-0 (hardback);
- 2011 The Time of Our Lives: A Conversation About America ISBN 978-1-4000-6458-8 (hardback);
- 2013 Christmas from Heaven: The True Story of the Berlin Candy Bomber ISBN 978-1-6090-7700-6 (hardback);
- 2015 A Lucky Life Interrupted: A Memoir of Hope ISBN 978-1-4000-6969-9 (hardback) ISBN 978-0804-19500-3 (paperback);
- 2019 The Fall of Richard Nixon: A Reporter Remembers Watergate ISBN 978-1-4000-6970-5 (hardback) ISBN 978-0-5932-0925-7 (paperback);
- 2023 Never Give Up: A Prairie Family's Story ISBN 978-0-5935-9637-1 (hardback).

== Awards and honors ==
Over his career, Brokaw has received Seven Emmy Awards including one for China in Crisis special report.

Organizations	Year	Notes	Result	Ref.
South Dakota Broadcasting Hall of Fame	1981	First recipient of the Tom Brokaw Award	Honored	
Peabody Award	1989	For the report called To Be an American	Honored	
American Academy of Achievement	1989	Golden Plate Award	Honored	
Alfred I. duPont–Columbia University Awards	1989	For the Dateline NBC special on racial separation in suburban America	Honored	
Alfred I. duPont–Columbia University Awards	1990	For excellence in broadcast journalism for his interview with Mikhail Gorbachev	Honored	
National Conference of Christians and Jews	1990	National Headliner Award	Honored	
South Dakota Hall of Fame	1991	Inductee into the South Dakota Hall of Fame	Honored	
Freedom Forum	1992	Al Neuharth Award for Excellence in the Media	Honored	
Emmy Award	1993	Reporting on floods in the Midwest	Won	
Boston University	1995	The Dennis Kauff Memorial Award for Lifetime Achievement in Journalism	Honored	
Marist College	1995	Lowell Thomas Award	Honored	
University of Missouri School of Journalism	1997	Honor Medal for Distinguished Service in Journalism	Honored	
Fred Friendly First Amendment Award	1998	For "individuals devoted to freedom of speech and First Amendment"	Honored	
American Legion	1998	Distinguished public service Award	Honored	
Citizens' Scholarship Foundation	1998	America's President's Award	Honored	
Congressional Medal of Honor Society	1999	Tex" McCrary Excellence in Journalism Award	Honored	
Emmy Awards	1999	International coverage of the Kosovo conflict	Won	
Radio Television Digital News Association	2002	Paul White Award	Honored	
Peabody Award	2003	For his special report called "A Question of Fairness"	Honored	
American Academy of Arts and Sciences;	2005	Elected to its membership	Honored	
Freedom of Speech And Expression	2005	Four Freedoms Medal	Honored	
Washington State University	2006	Edward R. Murrow Lifetime Achievement in Broadcasting Award	Honored	
United States Military Academy at West Point	2006	Sylvanus Thayer Award	Honored	
Arizona State University	2006	Walter Cronkite Award for Excellence in Journalism	Honored	
Television Hall of Fame	2006	Induction into the Television Hall of Fame	Honored	
Horatio Alger Association	2007	Horatio Alger Award for Distinguished Americans	Honored	
Broadcast Journalism from WFUV	2011	Charles Osgood Lifetime Achievement Award	Honored	
Vanderbilt University	2012	The Nichols-Chancellor's Medal	Honored	
Old Sturbridge Village	2012	Ken Burns Lifetime Achievement Award	Honored	
Peabody Award	2013	Honorary Peabody for enhancing his reputation since he left the NBC News desk	Honored	
Presidential Medal of Freedom	2014	Medal presented by President Barack Obama	Honored	
French Legion of Honor	2016	For supporting of WWII veterans, along with actor Tom Hanks and Gordon H. Mueller	Honored	
Poynter Institute	2016	Lifetime Achievement in Journalism Award	Honored	

Honorary degrees

- Air University (United States Air Force);
- Arizona State University;
- Boston College;
- Brandeis University;
- California Institute of Technology;
- The College of William & Mary;
- Dartmouth College;
- Duke University;
- Emory University;
- Fairfield University;
- Fordham University;
- Florida State University
- Hofstra University;
- John Carroll University;
- Johns Hopkins University;
- Montana State University;
- Mayo Clinic and the College of Medicine;
- Northwestern University;
- Providence College;
- Saint Anselm College;
- Seton Hall University;
- Skidmore College;
- St. Lawrence University;
- University of Iowa;
- University of Montana;
- University of Notre Dame;
- University of Oklahoma;
- University of Pennsylvania;
- University of South Dakota;
- University of South Carolina;
- Washington University in St. Louis.

== See also ==
- New Yorkers in journalism

== Notes ==
Media offices
Preceded by Barbara Walters and Jim Hartz	Today Co-Anchor with Jane Pauley; June 7, 1976 – December 31, 1981	Succeeded by Jane Pauley and Bryant Gumbel
Preceded by John Chancellor	NBC Nightly News Anchor; April 5, 1982 – December 1, 2004 (co-anchor with Roger Mudd until September 5, 1983)	Succeeded by Brian Williams
Preceded by Tim Russert	Meet the Press Moderator; June 29, 2008 – December 7, 2008	Succeeded by David Gregory
