= Atchison USD 409 =

Public school district in Atchison, Kansas

Address
- 626 Commercial St. Atchison, Kansas, 66002; United States
- Coordinates: 39.56167°N 95.12162°W

District information
- Type: Public
- Grades: PreK to 12
- Schools: 4

Other information
- Website: usd409.net

Atchison USD 409 is a public unified school district headquartered in Atchison, Kansas, United States.

== History ==
In 2021, the school board decided to change from Native American themed mascots for the sports teams at their high school and middle school.

== Schools ==
The school district operates four schools:

- Atchison High School
- Atchison Middle School
- Atchison Elementary School
- Central School

== See also ==
- List of high schools in Kansas
- List of unified school districts in Kansas
