= Atchison High School =

Location
- 1500 West Riley Street; Atchison, Kansas 66002; United States
- Coordinates: 39°34′7″N 95°8′22″W

Information
- School type: Public, High School
- School district: Atchison USD 409
- CEEB code: 170140
- Teaching staff: 36.80 (FTE)
- Grades: 9–12
- Gender: Coed
- Enrollment: 434 (2023–2024)
- Student to teacher ratio: 11.79
- Campus type: Rural
- Color
- Team name: Phoenix
- Website: atchisonhs.ss13.sharpschool.com

Atchison High School is a public secondary school in Atchison, Kansas, United States, operated by Atchison USD 409 school district. It serves students of grades 9 to 12.

== Notable alumni ==
- Chester Mize (1917–1994), Republican member of the United States House of Representatives from Kansas
- Harry Alexander Smith (1866–1929), US Army major general
- John Cameron Swayze (1906–1995), news commentator, spokesperson, game show panelist during the 1950s, graduated in 1924

== See also ==
- List of high schools in Kansas
- List of unified school districts in Kansas
