= SS Atchison Victory =

World War II Victory ship of the United States

- Typical Victory Ship.

History

United States
- Name: SS Atchison Victory
- Namesake: Atchison, Kansas
- Owner: War Shipping Administration
- Operator: American President Lines
- Builder: California Shipbuilding Company, Los Angeles
- Laid down: 17 February 1944
- Launched: 22 April 1944
- Completed: 8 June 1944
- Fate: Sold to the United Kingdom, 1946

United Kingdom
- Name: SS Mohamed Ali el-Kebir
- Operator: Khedivial Mail S.S. Company
- Route: Alexandria - New York City
- Fate: Sold to Egypt, 1960

(United Arab Republic) Egypt
- Name: SS Salah El Din
- Acquired: United Arab Maritime Company 1961
- Fate: Burned, 4 September 1963 Sold to Liberia, 1963

Liberia
- Name: SS Mercantile Victory
- Fate: Burned, 1964 Scrapped, 1965

General characteristics
- Class & type: VC2-S-AP3 Victory ship
- Tonnage: 7612 GRT, 4,553 NRT
- Displacement: 15,200 tons
- Length: 455 ft (139 m)
- Beam: 62 ft (19 m)
- Draft: 28 ft (8.5 m)
- Installed power: 8,500 shp (6,300 kW)
- Propulsion: HP & LP turbines geared to a single 20.5-foot (6.2 m) propeller
- Speed: 16.5 knots
- Boats & landing craft carried: 4 Lifeboats
- Complement: 62 Merchant Marine and 28 US Naval Armed Guards
- Armament: 1 × 5 inch (127 mm)/38 caliber gun; 1 × 3 inch (76 mm)/50 caliber gun; 8 × 20 mm Oerlikon

SS Atchison Victory was a Victory ship built during World War II under the Emergency Shipbuilding program. She was launched by the California Shipbuilding Company on 22 April 1944 and completed on 8 June 1944. The ship’s United States Maritime Commission designation was VC2-S-AP3, hull number 11 (MCV-11, V11). She was built at a cost of $3,606,688.00 in 1944. The Maritime Commission turned her over to a civilian contractor, the American President Lines, for operation until the end of hostilities. Atchison Victory served in the Pacific during World War II. Her first stop was to Pearl Harbor on her way to the islands in the Pacific.

== Postwar service ==
Atchison Victory was purchased by Furness Withy in 1946 and renamed SS Mohamed Ali el-Kebir. After refitting as an 8199-GRT 78 passenger, 1st class accommodations, cargo liner, she began service between Alexandria and New York City in 1948. She was renamed the SS Salah el-Din in 1960, but service to New York ended when she was nationalized by the United Arab Maritime Company in 1961 and converted back to a cargo only ship.

After two 1962 voyages through the Saint Lawrence Seaway, the Salah el-Din suffered a superstructure fire on 4 September 1963 killing the chief steward and gutting the bridge and crew's quarters. The fire was extinguished with the help of Hamilton, Ontario, firefighters who prevented the fire from reaching explosive cargo in the forward hold; but the ship took on a heavy angle of list. Stability was restored by pumping out the firefighting water, and on 22 November 1963 the Salah El-Din left Hamilton under tow. Salvador Investment Company purchased the ship at Quebec City for repair in Houston. The ship was renamed SS Mercantile Victory and returned to service in March 1964, but suffered an engine room fire on the Red Sea on 23 April 1964. The ship was towed to Khorramshahr in Iran to offload her cargo, and then was towed back to Marseille in France. Repair was considered impractical, so the ship was scrapped at Castellón de la Plana in 1965.

== Sources ==
- Sawyer, L.A. and W.H. Mitchell. Victory ships and tankers: The history of the ‘Victory’ type cargo ships and of the tankers built in the United States of America during World War II, Cornell Maritime Press, 1974, 0-87033-182-5.
- United States Maritime Commission:
- Victory Cargo Ships
