= American Civics Test =

Oral examination in the U.S. naturalization process

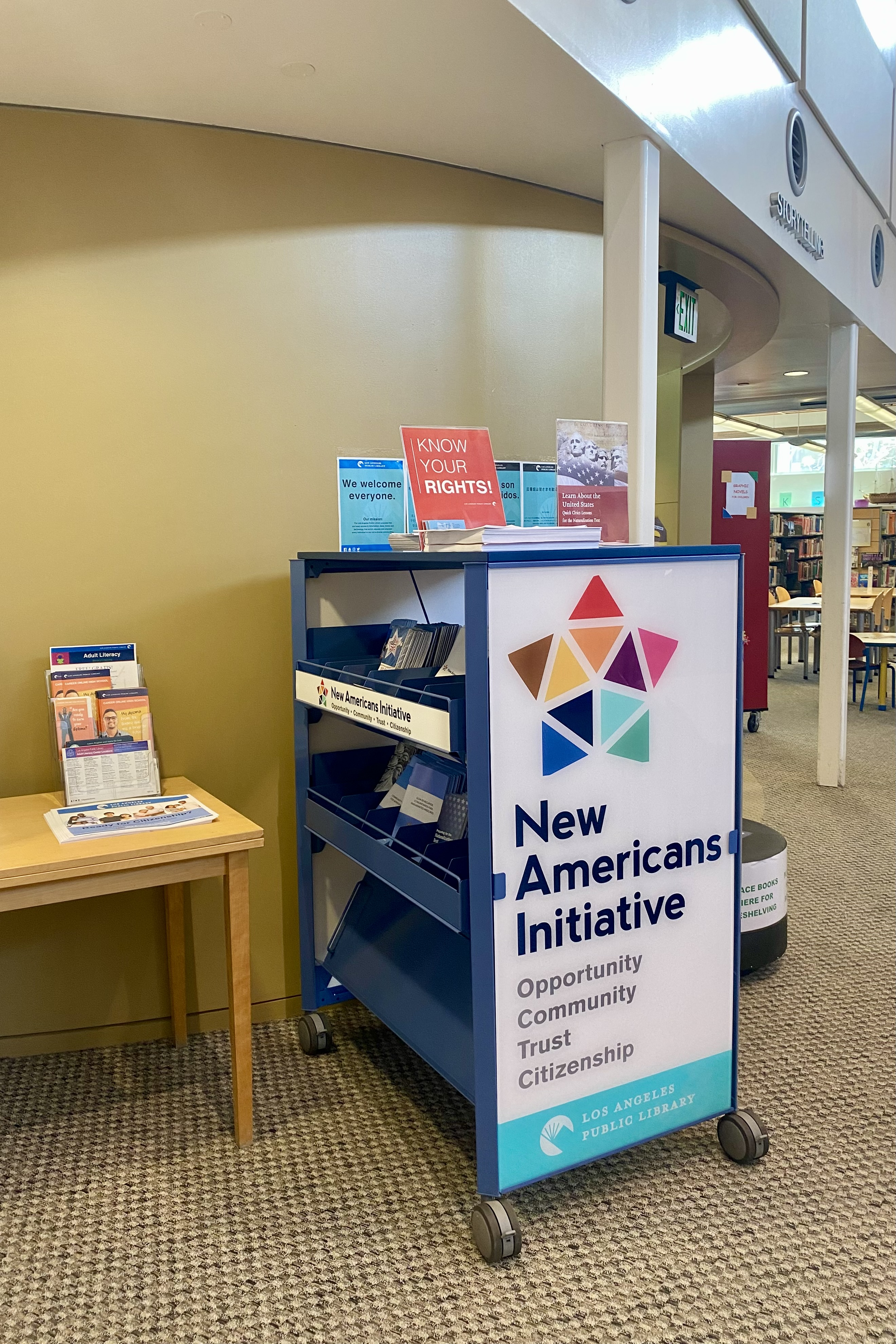
Local libraries may offer free resources to help naturalization applicants prepare for the American Civics Test

The American Civics Test (also known as the American Citizenship Test, U.S. Civics Test, U.S. Citizenship Test, and U.S. Naturalization Test) is an oral examination that is administered to immigrants who are applying for U.S. citizenship. The test is designed to assess the applicants' knowledge of U.S. history and government. US Citizenship and Immigration Services (USCIS) administers the test as part of the naturalization process.

== History ==
The Basic Naturalization Act, passed by Congress on June 29, 1906, established the Bureau of Immigration and Naturalization, which oversaw national standardization of citizenship procedures. Prior to the 1906 law, naturalization was under the jurisdiction of the courts (municipal, county, state, or federal), where petitioners could go to the most convenient location and procedures varied. Because there was no explicit requirement to administer a test on American civics as part of the naturalization process, testing was left to the judge's discretion.

During the Bureau of Naturalization's early years of operation, concerns were raised about immigrants being denied citizenship due to a lack of knowledge of American civics and history, so the bureau established education programs to combat the problem, but no standardized test or testing procedure was developed. As a result, courts continued to administer tests with no specific list of questions. The history of the test questions is difficult to document as they were given orally and were usually impromptu.

In an effort to reduce immigration, congress passed the Immigration Act of 1917. This act added a literacy test for ages 16 and above. The literacy test required one to have basic reading comprehension in any language. The modern day literacy test is similar, but it requires most to read, write, and be able to speak partial English. Depending on the circumstances, some may receive special accommodations allowing them to take the test in another language.

Reforms were implemented in 1933 by the newly consolidated Immigration and Naturalization Service (INS). Rather than memorizing simple trivial facts, changes were made to ensure that test takers had a meaningful understanding of US history and civics. Years later, on March 1, 2003, the United States Citizenship and Immigration Services (USCIS) was established and took over all responsibility for immigration service functions previously managed by the INS. Following a thorough investigation, it was discovered that the INS lacked standard test content, instruments, protocols, and even a scoring system for the naturalization process. Although the INS began combating these issues in 2001, the Department of Homeland Security suggested reforms to the citizenship test procedures under the newly established USCIS in 2005. The current version of the civics exam became a requirement of the naturalization process on October 1, 2008.

== Naturalization ==
=== Testing procedures ===
The civics test is part of the naturalization process for applicants seeking US citizenship. The test is prepared in English (with exceptions) and is administered orally by a USCIS officer who asks up to 10 of the 100 civics questions. Special considerations are given to applicants who demonstrate need. The questions cover a wide range of topics, including the principles of American democracy, the functions of the different branches of government, and the rights and responsibilities of U.S. citizens.

The test questions are in 3 major categories.

American Government:

- Principle of American Democracy,
- System of Government,
- Rights and Responsibilities

American History:

- Colonial Period and Independence
- 1800s
- Recent American History and Other Important Historical Information

Integrated Civics:

- Geography
- Symbols
- Holidays

U.S. Citizenship Test Questions since October 20, 2025

Among the 100 questions that may be asked to applicants, a few examples (along with corresponding answers) are:

- "What is the supreme law of the land?"
  - "The Constitution"
- "Name one branch or part of the government."
  - "Congress"
  - "legislative"
  - "President"
  - "executive"
  - "the courts"
  - "judicial"
- "What is the highest court in the United States?"
  - "the Supreme Court"

Keep in mind that an applicant may have to study for some of these questions, if they are at least 65 years old and have been a legal permanent resident for at least 20 years.

Over recent years, two types of tests were made:

==== Civics test (2008 version) ====
The 2008 civics test is an oral exam, and the USCIS officer will ask up to 10 questions from a list of 100 civics test questions. To pass the 2008 civics exam, applicants must correctly answer six questions. From March 2021 to October 20, 2025 this was the version in use in the country.

==== Civic test (2020 version) ====
The 2020 civics test is an oral exam, and the USCIS officer will ask up to 20 of the 128 civics test questions. To pass the 2020 civics exam, applicants must correctly answer at least 12 questions. In February 2021 this version of the test was abolished by President Joe Biden.

On September 17, 2025, the USCIS announced the 2020 Naturalization Civics Test would be reimplemented since October 20, 2025. The redesigned test expands the number of questions asked during the interview to 128, also raising the total number of correct answers. However, applicants who filed before October 20, 2025 take the older 2008 version.

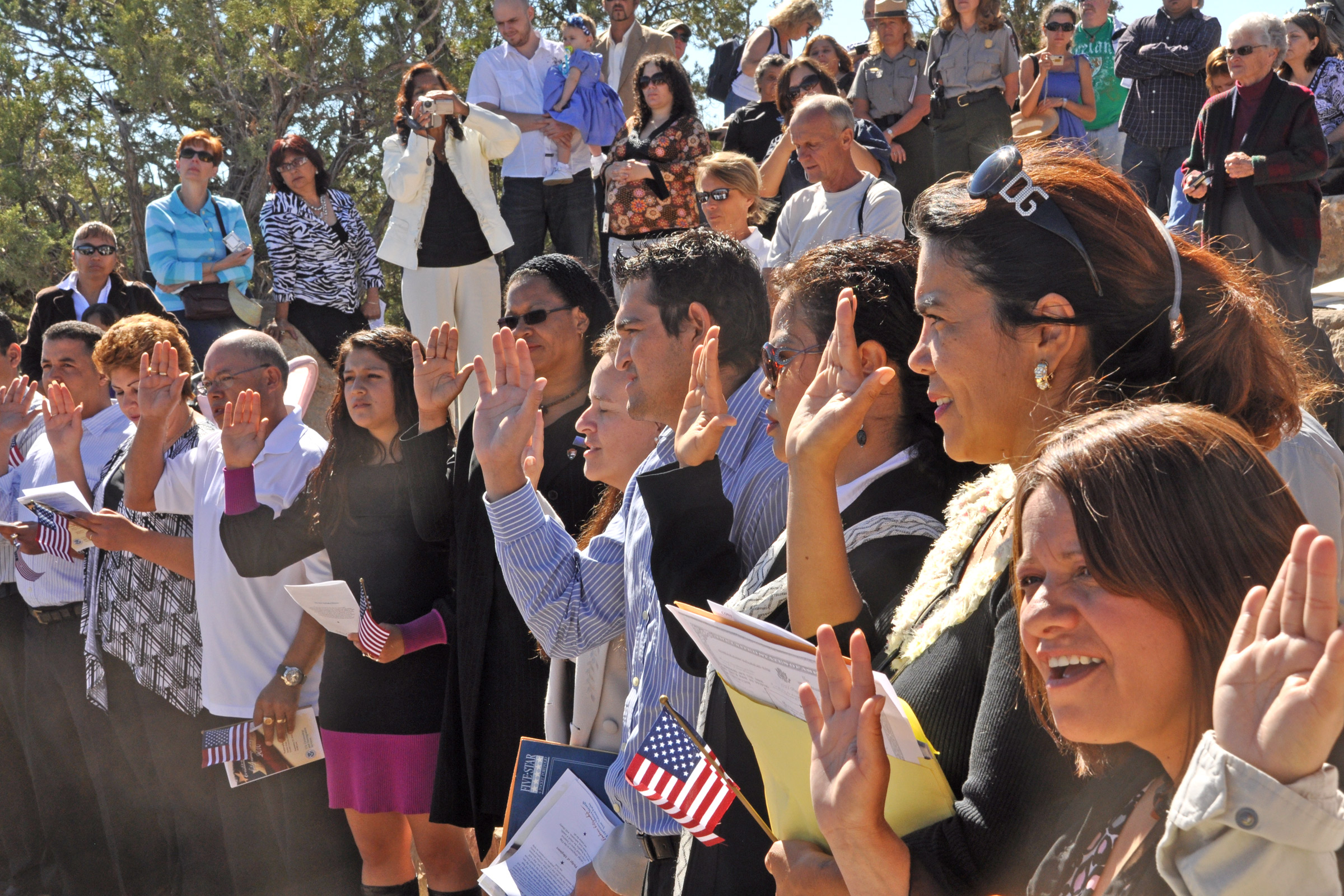
A naturalization ceremony at the Grand Canyon

Requirements

There are several requirements that an applicant must accomplish before they apply to become a citizen. These requirements include being at least 18 years old, being a legal permanent resident, and overall being a person of good moral character. An applicant may be denied an application to become a citizen if they have been convicted multiple times (depending on the charges), gained money through gambling, having a drinking problem, etc.

=== Accommodations ===
==== 65/20 special consideration ====
If the applicant is 65 years old or older and has been living in the United States as a lawful permanent resident of the United States for 20 or more years, they may only study for 20 select questions marked with an asterisk. They may also take the civics test in the language of their choice.

==== Disability waiver ====
Applicants seeking naturalization are expected to be literate in the English language as well as understand the fundamental principles of the history and government of the United States. Applicants with physical, developmental, and/or mental disabilities that last 12 months or more may be exempt from this requirement by completing a medical exemption form provided by USCIS. Only a medical doctor can verify and certify the information on the form.

==== English language exemption ====
The civics test can be taken in a non-English language requested by the applicant as part of the naturalization interview if:

- 50/20: the person filed the application when they were 50 years of age or older and lived in U.S. for 20 years or more as a lawful permanent resident with green card.
- 55/15: the person the application when they were 55 years of age or older and lived in U.S. for 15 years or more as a lawful permanent resident with green card.
- 65/20: the person the application when they were 65 years of age or older and lived in U.S. for 20 years or more as a lawful permanent resident with green card.

=== Controversy ===
On December 1, 2020, USCIS adopted a revised version of the 2008 civics test. This came after a decennial review during President Donald Trump's administration. The revised 2020 version increased the number of questions while making the wording more difficult for non-native English speakers. Many of the standards and accommodations were also modified, such as raising the application fee and expanding requirements for disabled applicants. To that end, immigration organizations warned that the test revision would make it harder for poor immigrants from non-English-speaking countries to become voting citizens. Although a copy of the test and its answers are made available online, advocates worry about more disadvantaged applicants' ability to understand more nuanced questions. Critics of the new test believe it is designed to add an unnecessary barrier to naturalization.

== Resources and initiatives ==
=== USCIS helpful materials ===
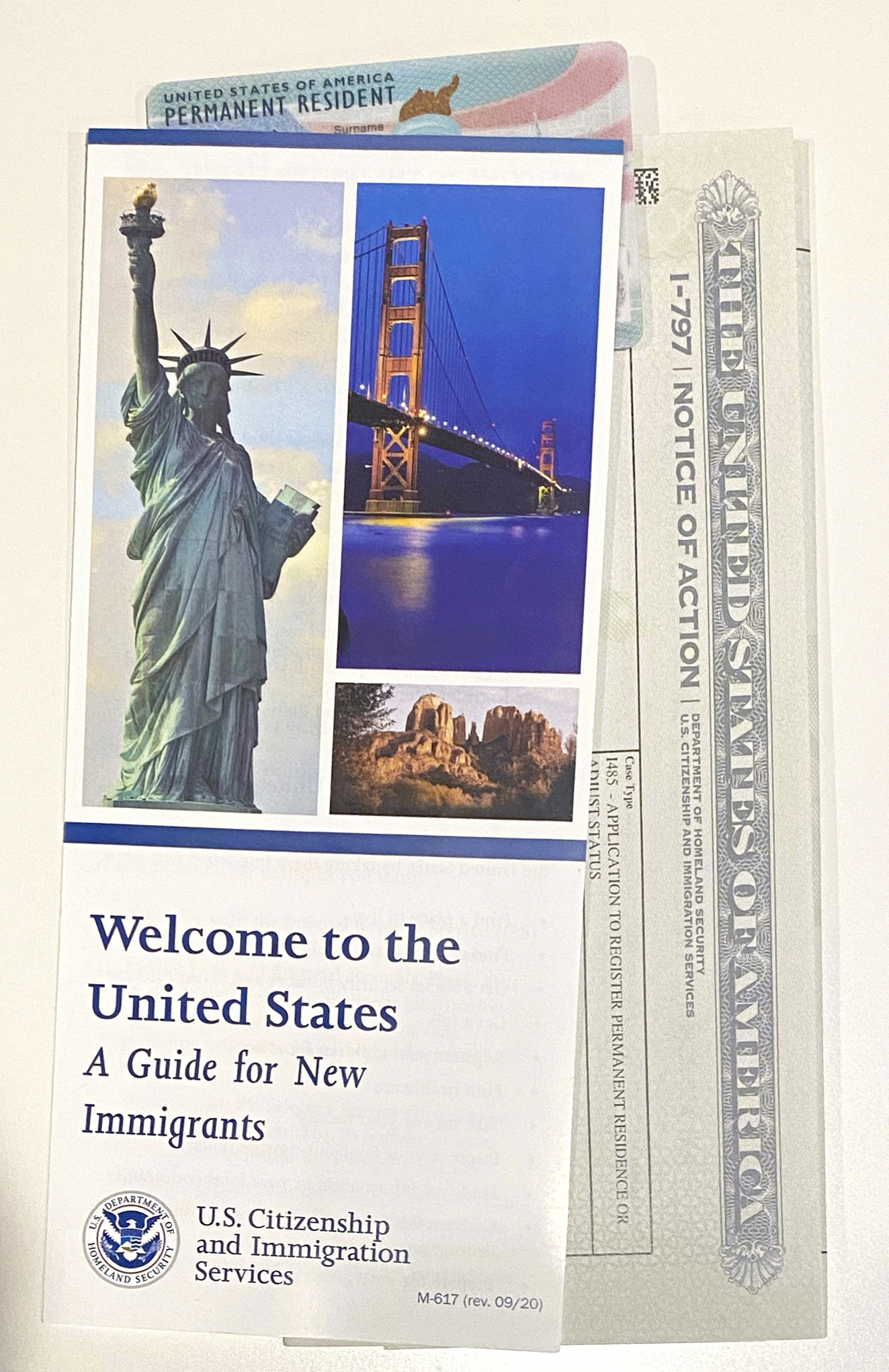
U.S. New Immigrant Guide

USCIS provides free study materials which includes sample test questions of both the 2020 and 2008 civics tests, although the 2008 version is in use within interviews. The agency is currently exploring ways to revamp the civics test, with the help of national engagements for feedback and comments on the proposed changes. The test will go through a trial phase for about five months in 2023. In the meantime, applicants preparing for the civics test should study the questions in accordance with the current policy applicable to their application case. USCIS has free information seminars held online and in person. These are open to anyone who is interested, and are offered in different languages. Citizenship classes are held for immigrants looking to naturalize. Legal assistance is available to those who seek advice. The USCIS also funds certain groups who help immigrants naturalize. Low cost services are available by state.

=== American civics in education ===
In January 2015, Arizona became the first state in the United States to require high school students to pass a civics test before graduation. The law, signed by Governor Doug Ducey, requires high school students to correctly answer 60 of 100 questions on a test similar to the one new citizens must pass during naturalization. Governor Ducey believes that requiring the civics test in schools would improve civic and political engagement in the country. Advocates like the Arizona-based Joe Foss Institute have set a goal of having all 50 states pass similar legislation by 2017, the 230th anniversary of the United States Constitution. However, only 20 states had followed suit as of 2019.
