= Black Hills Ordnance Depot =

Abandoned munitions storage facility in South Dakota, United States

Coordinates: 43°10′N 103°56′W

The Black Hills Ordnance Depot (BHOD) was a munitions storage and maintenance facility formerly operated by the United States Army Ordnance Corps. The depot was located in Fall River County, in far southwestern South Dakota about eight miles south of the town of Edgemont.

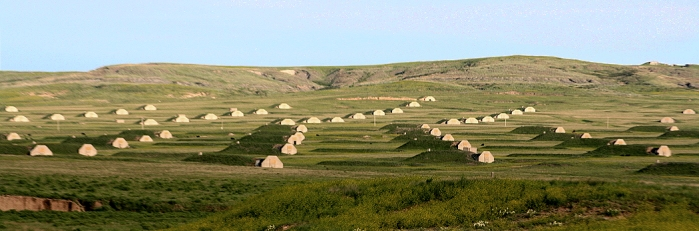
BHOD Bunker Landscape

BHOD was established and constructed in 1942, to help meet the Army's increased ordnance handling needs caused by World War II. Because of the relative remoteness of the location, nearly all of the facility's civilian workforce lived in federally owned housing at the depot; this residential community was known as Igloo.

Among Igloo's residents was a young Tom Brokaw, who spent a few years living on the base as a boy.

The level of employment at BHOD varied over the years, increasing during periods of war. During typical peacetime periods of the 1950s, between 650 and 750 workers were employed at the site, and the community population was around 1800 people.

BHOD was renamed "Black Hills Army Depot" (BHAD) in 1962.

Over the years, BHOD was used for storage and testing of chemical weapons, including sarin and mustard gas. Additionally, during World War II, the site also held Italian prisoners of war.

The Depot was closed on June 30, 1967, and the Igloo community was abandoned. The land was transferred to the General Service Administration which sold the majority of the land to Edgemont, South Dakota, and the remainder was transferred to the United States Forest Service. Once the Depot was closed, most of the residential housing units were moved to the Pine Ridge Indian Reservation. Three burning and chemical areas, and about 100 drums worth of waste remain on the former military base. A large number of former Depot buildings remained at the site in 2007.

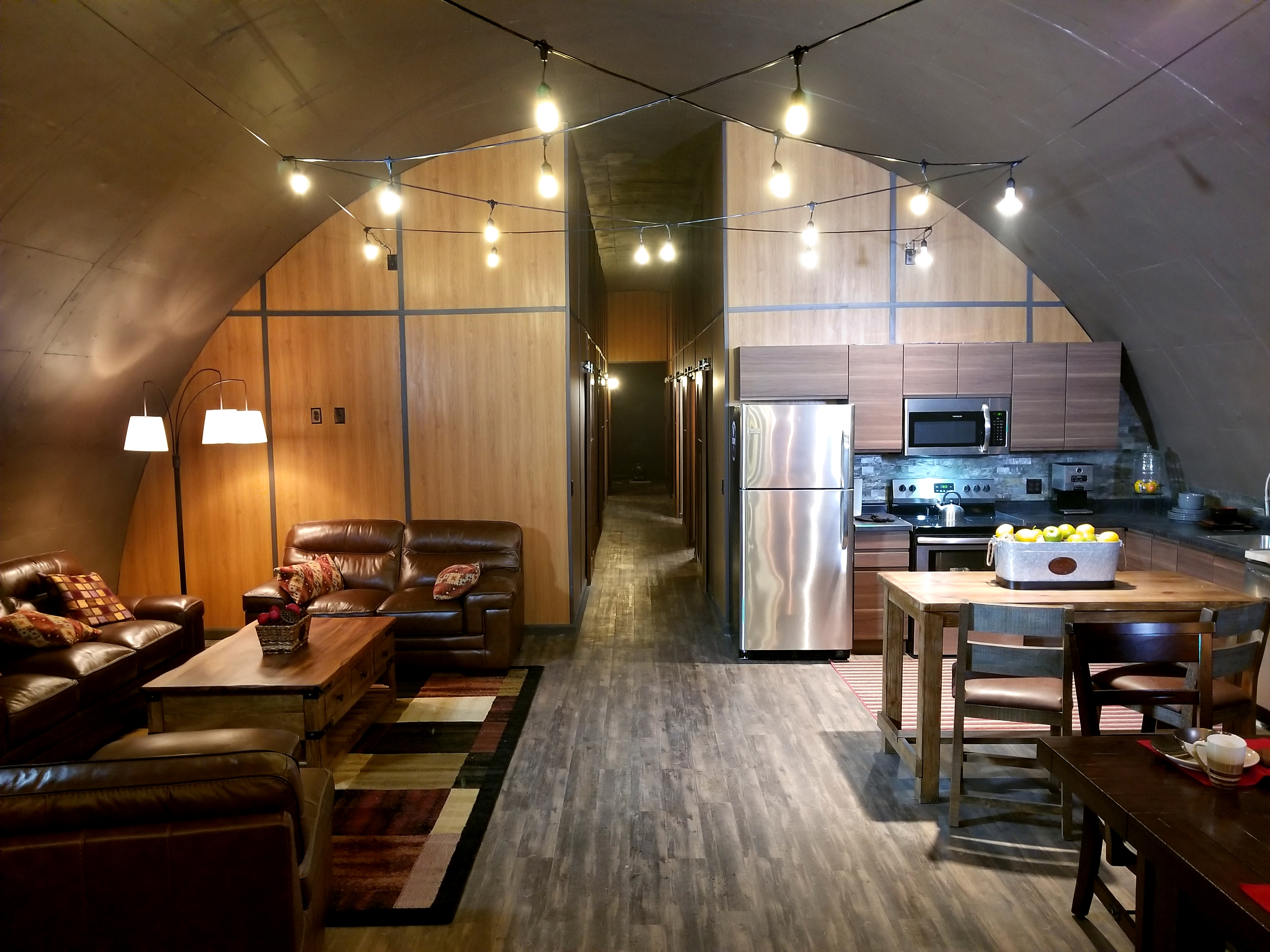
Vivos xPoint Showroom Bunker

Since 2016, The Vivos group has purchased the majority of the former base containing 575 of the ordnance igloos, each approximately 2,200 square feet (200 m^{2}). The development now known as Vivos xPoint has become an international story and is currently in filming by a major cable network for an ongoing docu-series on the making of the world's largest survival community. Homeowner Association (HOA) disputes have twice reached the South Dakota Supreme Court.
