= Atchison Storage Facility =

Underground warehouse in Kansas, U.S.

Coordinates: 39°32′36″N 95°07′03″W

The Atchison Storage Facility, commonly known as the Atchison Caves, is a 2.7-million-square-foot (250×10^{3} m^{2}) underground storage facility in a former pillar limestone mine, 50 to 150 feet (15 to 46 m) below the ground in the Missouri River bluffs, at Atchison, Kansas. The bunker complex was a secure US government storage facility from World War II until 2013.

As of April 2015, Smart Warehousing, based in Kansas, owns the Atchison Caves.

The facility, which is adjacent to Jackson Park in Atchison, has 125 acres (51 ha) of above ground land and 60 acres (24 ha) of underground storage space, and has been called the "World's Largest One-Level Storage Facility".

== History ==
In 1886, George W. Kerford began to quarry limestone from the large bluffs 2 miles (3.2 km) south of downtown Atchison, Kansas. Initially, the company produced riprap for the Chicago, Burlington and Quincy Railroad, one of several railroads that traveled through the area. The Kerford Quarry Company's operations at the site resulted in a series of large caverns supported by 20 to 30 feet (6.1 to 9.1 meters) of unmined rock. The mines in the quarry grew to encompass more than 60 acres (24 ha) of underground space.

=== World War II ===
During the Second World War, the United States War Food Administration was tasked with collecting and storing reserve farm products to support the war effort. A businessman in Atchison suggested to them that the Kerford Mines would be an ideal facility to store perishables due to the constant temperature and humidity in the caverns. In July 1944, the Kerford Quarry Company stopped their mining operations and began to lease the facility to the government for the sum of $20,000 each year.

The government immediately began renovations, spending nearly $2 million to create a refrigerated storage facility where the temperature would be maintained at 32 °F (0 °C). The War Food Administration stored perishables including meat, fruits, vegetables, dairy products, and eggs in the facility. In 1949, the Atchison Storage Facility held nearly 9,000 tons of eggs, 20,000 tons of prunes, 1,000 tons of raisins, and nearly 50 tons of milk.

=== The Cold War ===
In the years leading up to World War II, the Army Ordnance Department suffered from a shortage of specialized-production machine tools. These highly specialized tools were necessary to make the increasingly complex weapons used in modern battles. In the drawdown following the war, the Army began to stockpile these tools to be held in reserve status, for use during another national mobilization.

The Atchison Storage Facility, with its constant temperature, low humidity, and protection from the building threat of nuclear weapons, was chosen to be part of the Ordnance Corps Production Equipment Readiness Program. The tools were held in a state of readiness, to be shipped nationwide to manufacturers in the event of a national emergency.

In 1952, the facility was renamed the United States Storage Facility – Atchison Caves. The Army converted two of the largest mines (more than 60 acres (24 ha) of underground space) into storage areas with the installation of concrete block walls, concrete floors, electrical lighting, sump pumps, air-handling equipment, and an extensive dehumidification system. To facilitate moving the large machine tools in and out of the storage facility, a truck receiving dock was built near the entrance. A railroad spur and dock were constructed, and dock facilities for barges were established on the Missouri River.

A shop to refurbish and maintain the machine tools was established at the facility. At its peak, a private contractor was responsible for maintaining more than 5,000 machine tools in the reserve facility.

In 1977, the facility was transferred to the Defense Logistics Agency and renamed as the Atchison Storage Facility. It was later used to store surplus parachutes (more than 8,500), medical supplies and important defense department documents, plans, and computer files. Documents classified as Secret were securely stored inside two large vaults.

Until 2013, it was operated by the Army Reserve's 88th Regional Support Command in Fort McCoy, Wisconsin. Defense Department documents listed the facility's use as storage and training. They list the size of the facility as 125 acres (51 ha) above ground and 60 acres (24 ha) below ground. In the 1990s, some hazardous materials were identified at a former landfill at the site. Extensive site remediation was conducted. Groundwater monitoring is being conducted in cooperation with the State of Kansas.

== Ownership ==
In April 2013, the entire facility and property was sold via an online GSA auction. The final sales price was $510,001.00. One of the new owners was Coby Cullins, a businessman from Missouri.

In April 2015, Smart Warehousing owned the Atchison Caves.
