= Joe Foss Institute =

American nonprofit to promote patriotism

The Joe Foss Institute is a nonprofit organization in the United States that promotes civic education programs. It was founded in 2001 by general and politician Joe Foss, and is headquartered in Scottsdale, Arizona.

== History ==
The Institute was founded in 2001 by General Joseph J. Foss and his wife Donna Foss to promote civic education in the United States. It offers educational programs for youth groups and public school students, involving events like veterans visiting schools to talk about their experiences or the screening of patriotic films, including a film about the life of Foss. The institute also awards scholarships to students who win video and essay competitions.

In 2015, the organization campaigned to make passing the American Civics Test, which is administered as a requirement for naturalized citizens, a requirement of graduating high school.

The institute holds an annual Stars in Service event to honor national heroes, educators and public servants. Traditionally held in Arizona, past speakers have included Charles Krauthammer, Carl Bernstein and Richard Dreyfuss.
