= Atchison, Kansas =

City in northeast Kansas, U.S.

- City and County seat
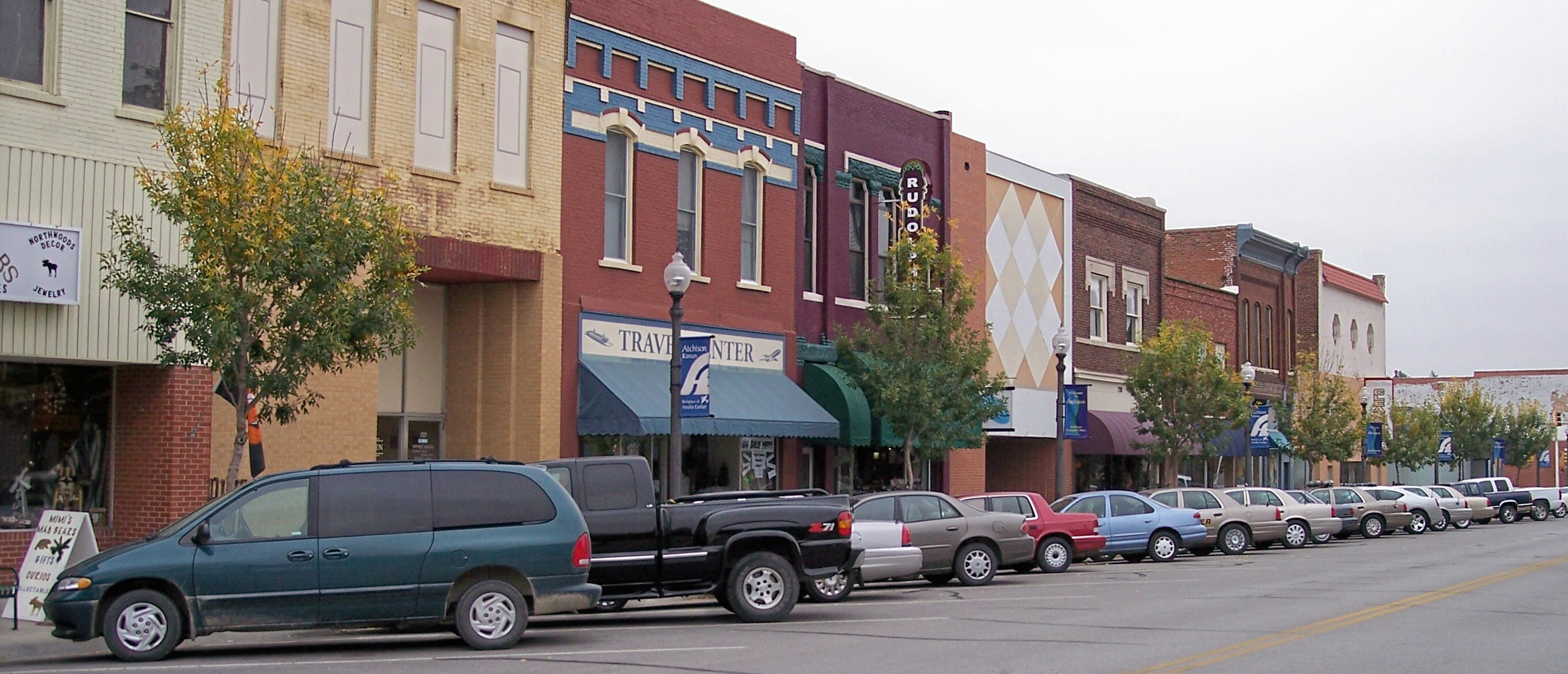
- Commercial Street in downtown Atchison (2006)

- Flag

- Location within Atchison County and Kansas

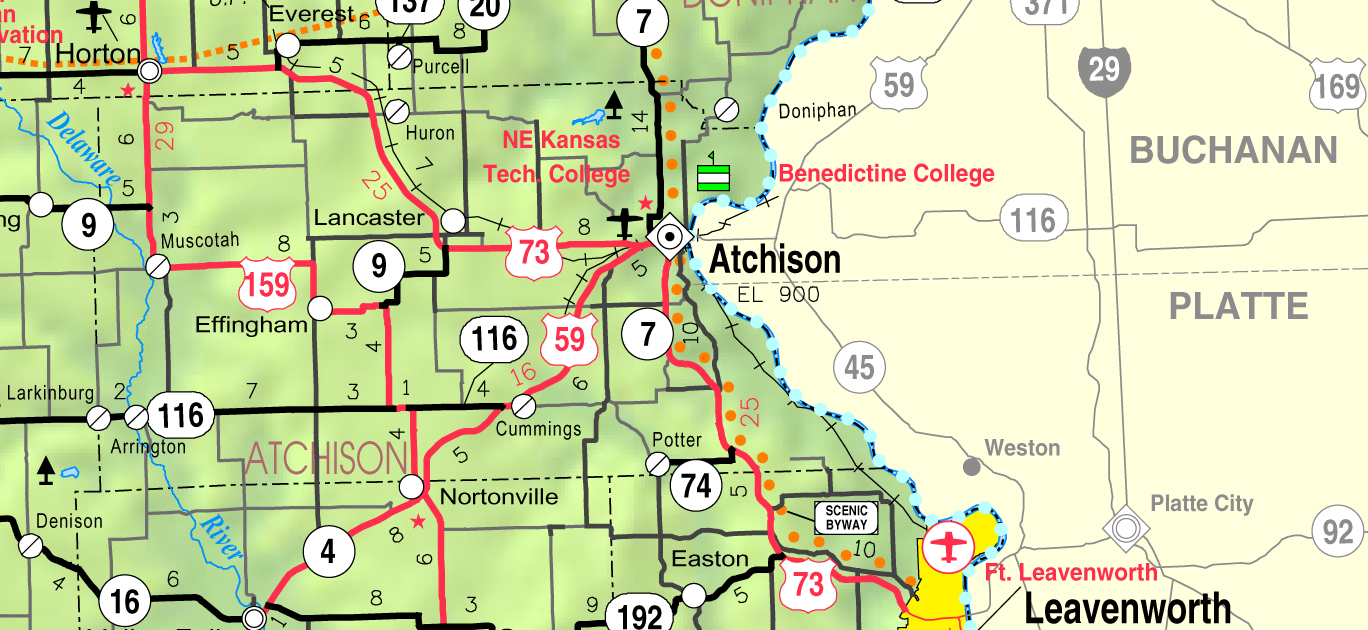
- KDOT map of Atchison County (legend)
- Coordinates: 39°33′45″N 95°7′42″W
- Country: United States
- State: Kansas
- County: Atchison
- Founded: 1854
- Incorporated: 1855
- Named for: David Rice Atchison

Government
  - Type: Council-Manager
  - Mayor: La Rochelle Young
  - City Manager: Mark Westhoff

Area
  - Total: 8.47 sq mi (21.93 km^{2})
  - Land: 8.01 sq mi (20.75 km^{2})
  - Water: 0.46 sq mi (1.18 km^{2})
- Elevation: 869 ft (265 m)

Population (2020)
  - Total: 10,885
  - Density: 1,359/sq mi (524.6/km^{2})
- Time zone: UTC-6 (CST)
  - Summer (DST): UTC-5 (CDT)
- ZIP Code: 66002
- Area code: 913
- FIPS code: 20-02900
- GNIS ID: 485542
- Website: CityOfAtchison.com

Atchison is a city in and the county seat of Atchison County, Kansas, United States, along the Missouri River. As of the 2020 census, the population of the city was 10,885. The city is named in honor of US Senator David Rice Atchison from Missouri and was the original eastern terminus of the Atchison, Topeka and Santa Fe Railway. Atchison is also the home of Benedictine College, a Catholic liberal arts university.

== History ==
=== Founding ===
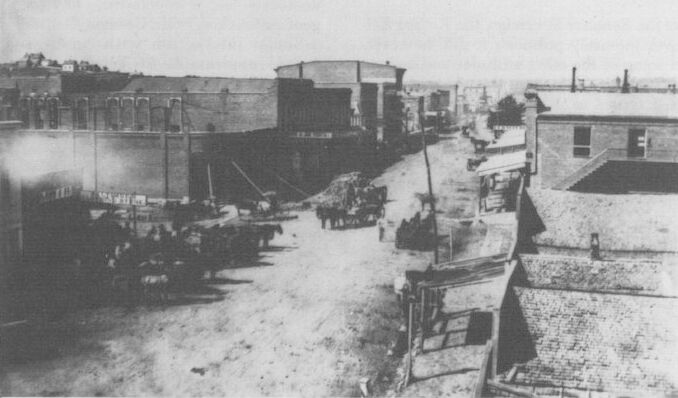
Commercial Street, 1860

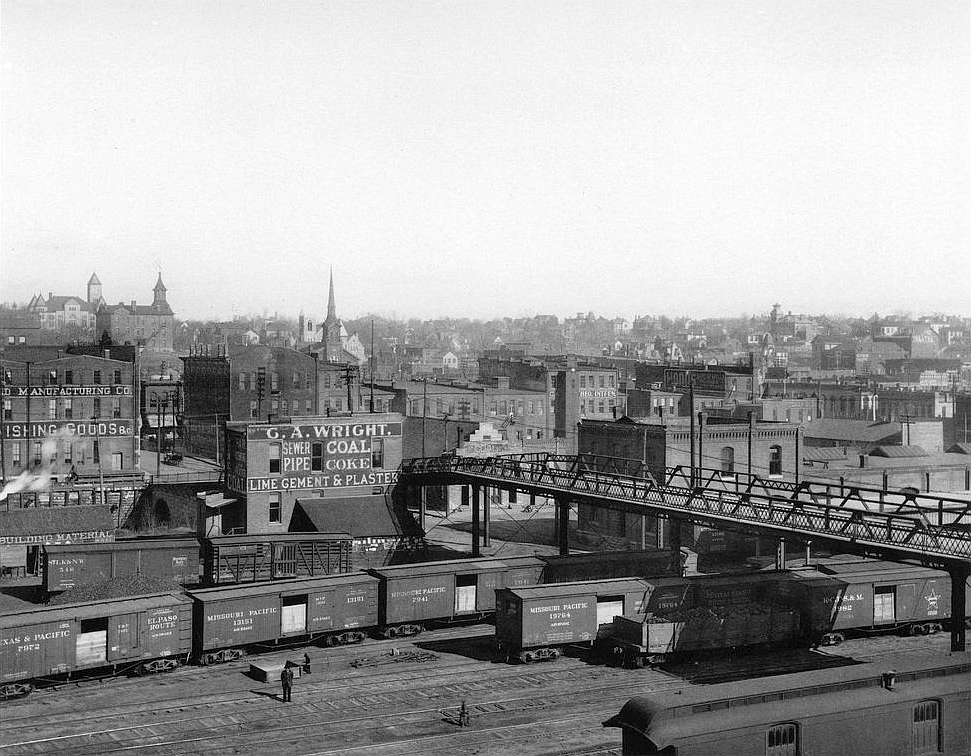
Looking north at the rail yard beneath the lower Sixth Street viaduct, circa 1880-1900

Atchison was founded in 1854 and named in honor of Missouri senator David Rice Atchison, who, when Kansas was opened for settlement, interested some of his friends in the scheme of forming a city in the new territory. Senator Atchison was interested in ensuring that the population of the new Kansas Territory would be majority pro-slavery, as he had been a prominent promoter of both slavery and the idea of popular sovereignty over the issue in the new lands. However, not everyone agreed upon the location he had selected, and on July 20, 1854, Dr. John H. Stringfellow, Ira Norris, Leonidas Oldham, James B. Martin, and Neal Owens left Platte City, Missouri, to decide definitely upon a site. They found a site that was the natural outlet of a remarkably rich agricultural region just open to settlement. George M. Million and Samuel Dickson had staked claims near the river; Dr. Stringfellow staked a tract north of Million's. Million sold his claim for $1,000—an exorbitant price. Eighteen persons were present when the town company was formally organized by electing Peter T. Abell, president; James Burns, treasurer; and Dr. Stringfellow, secretary. The site was divided into 100 shares by the company, of which each member retained five shares, the remainder being reserved for common benefit of all. By September 20, 1854, Henry Kuhn had surveyed the 480 acres (1.9 km^{2}) and made a plat, and the next day was fixed for the sale of lots, an event of great importance as it had become understood that Senator Atchison would make a speech upon the political question of the day, hence the sale would be of political as well as business significance. At his meeting on the 21st, two public institutions of vital interest to a new community were planned for—a hotel and a newspaper. Each share of stock in the town company was assessed $25, the proceeds to be used to build the National Hotel, which was completed in the spring of 1855, and $400 was donated to Dr. Stringfellow and Robert S. Kelley to erect a printing office.

The Squatter Sovereign, a paper with strong pro-slavery sentiments, was first issued on February 3, 1855. It had formerly been published at Liberty, Missouri, under the name of the Democratic Platform. In the spring of 1857 it was purchased by Samuel C. Pomeroy, Robert McBratney and F.G. Adams, who changed its policy and published it as a free-state paper until the fall of the same year, when Pomeroy became the sole owner.

The first post office in Atchison was established April 10, 1855, with Kelley as postmaster. It was opened in a small building in the block later occupied by the Otis house. In July 1883, the free-delivery system was inaugurated.

For years there had been considerable trade up and down the Missouri River, which had naturally centered at Leavenworth, but in June 1855, several overland freighters, such as Livingston, Kinkead & Co., and Hooper & Williams were induced to select Atchison as their outfitting point and formed the basis that established Atchison as a commercial center. Early merchants to establish businesses in the new town were George Challis, Burns Bros., Stephen Johnston and Samuel Dickson.

On August 30, 1855, Atchison was incorporated. Dr. Stringfellow had North Atchison surveyed and platted in the fall of 1857. This started a fever of additions. In February 1858, West Atchison was laid out by John Roberts, and in May Samuel Dickson had his property surveyed as South Atchison. Still another addition was made by John Challis.

Until 1858, the city was a pro-slavery bastion, but by that year, the anti-slavery forces took control of the city. On February 12, 1858, the legislature issued a charter to the city of Atchison, which was approved by the people on March 2 at a special election. The first city officers were elected at a second special election on March 13, 1858, and Republican Samuel C. Pomeroy was elected mayor. The German element, largely Catholic, opposed the Sunday closing laws of the new city government, but a satisfactory compromise was reached that allowed the sale of beer on Sundays after church services.

=== Early development ===
The first schools in the town were private, including parochial schools operated by the Germans. One of the first English schools was opened in 1857 by Lizzie Bay. The first school district was established in October 1858, and a month later the Atchison free high school was opened at the corner of Atchison and Commercial streets.

=== Civil War ===
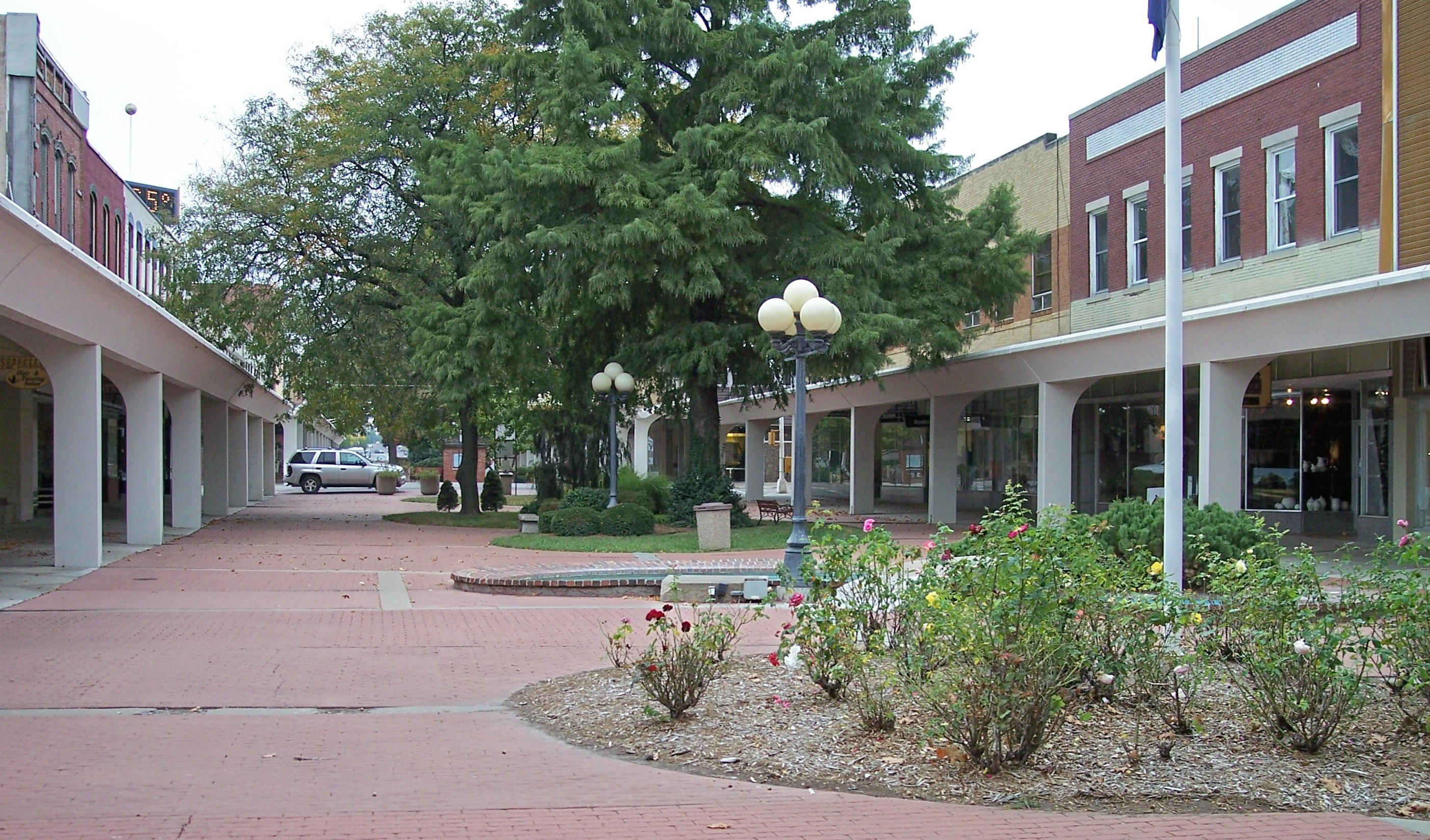
Pedestrian mall on Commercial Street in downtown Atchison (2006)

At the outbreak of the American Civil War there were three militia companies organized in Atchison, whose members enlisted in the Kansas regiments. They were known as Companies A, C and “At All Hazards”. Early in September 1861, a home guard was organized in the town to protect it in case of invasion from Missouri, and on the 15th of the month another company was raised, which was subsequently mustered into a state regiment. In 1863 the city of Atchison raised $4,000 to assist the soldiers from the county and after the Lawrence Massacre a like sum was subscribed to assist the stricken people of that city. Citizens of the town also joined the vigilance committees that so materially aided the civil authorities in suppressing raiding and the lawless bands of thieves that infested the border counties.

During the war, Atchison was also the headquarters of numerous bands of jayhawkers including the notorious Charles Metz, who was known as Cleveland. Metz, a former prisoner at the Missouri State Penitentiary, selected Atchison as his headquarters for raids into Missouri and was accepted with open arms by the people of the town. During his period of operations, he stole hundreds of horses from Missouri farmers and sold them in Kansas. He robbed any suspected southern sympathizer and threatened several leading citizens with murder and robbery if they remained in town. He even had the audacity to run off the first president of Atchison, P.T. Abell, who was forced into exile until after the Civil War concluded. He defied all authorities who attempted to rein in his excesses, but was finally shot and killed at some point in 1862. He is buried in St. Joseph, Missouri.

=== Industrialization ===
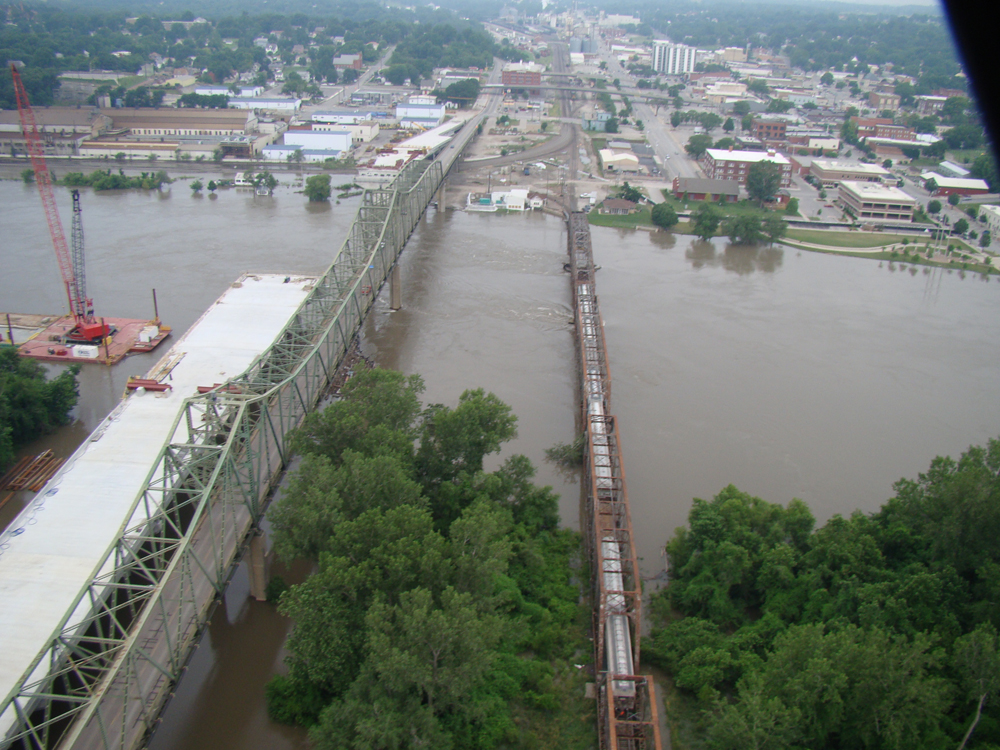
The new Atchison Bridge, the Amelia Earhart Bridge and the Atchison rail bridge on June 26, 2011, during the 2011 Missouri River floods

In the late 1850s, plans were underway to connect California to the rest of the country by rail. The logical location for a western terminus was in or around San Francisco, California, but an eastern terminus had yet to be chosen. Atchison was in fierce competition to be selected as the terminus, and in order to bolster its position, a rail line was constructed from St. Joseph, Missouri to Atchison between 1857 and 1859, funded in large part by $150,000 raised by the citizens of Atchison and connected to the Hannibal & St. Joseph R.R. at its eastern end. The Atchison and Topeka Railroad was founded in 1859 with Atchison as its eastern terminus and the intention of connecting Kansas to the southwest by rail. Although construction was delayed by the Civil War, a land grant similar to the one given the Union Pacific to construct the first transcontinental railroad was made by the federal government to Kansas in 1863, which was transferred to the newly reformed Atchison, Topeka, and Santa Fe Railroad (AT&SF). Finally, in 1868, construction was begun on the line in Topeka, but was aimed west and south towards the Colorado border. The connection between Atchison and Topeka, a distance of less than 50 miles, would not be completed until May, 1872.

The city tried to become a major railroad center, but was surpassed by Kansas City and Omaha, due to the former's greater industrial capability and connections to Texas and the latter's connection to Chicago, rather than St. Louis. Furthermore, Atchison boosters were unable to unite on a single project, instead scattering their efforts to the southwest, west and northwest, none of which proved successful. A proposed "Atchison and Pike's Peak" line was eventually taken over by the Union Pacific, while a speculative Atchison-Nebraska connector was eventually finished and taken over by other investors. Bickering delayed the building of bridges, stockyards, elevators, warehouses and railroad yards, revealing the disharmony that plagued Atchison's entrepreneurs.

However, with the completion of the connector to St. Joseph, which later became part of the Missouri Pacific, and the final connection to the growing AT&SF system, industrialization reached Atchison. Grain elevators, flour mills, and a flax mill were all erected in Atchison in the late 1860s and early 1870s. Several prominent businessmen in town lured Captain John Seaton, who operated a foundry in Alton, Illinois, to town to improve the Atchison Foundry and Machine Works in 1872. It soon began turning out decorative wrought iron fences, spiral staircases, and hitching posts for horses. The foundry expanded quickly, as Seaton transported his entire Alton operation to Atchison to establish the Seaton Foundry. It employed over 200 men and had a payroll of more than $14,000 per month in 1872. Expanding rapidly in the coming years, it was known as Seaton Lea for most of the 1870s, becoming the Atchison Foundry and Machine Works in 1880. A branch location was constructed in Lincoln, Nebraska in 1881, but closed in 1887. In 1905, the Locomotive Finished Materials Company was established by Harry E. Muchnic, formerly of the AT&SF railroad, which produced finished materials for the construction of railroad locomotives in close conjunction with Seaton's foundry. The companies eventually merged in 1914 after the 1912 death of John Seaton.

After his arrival in 1872, John Seaton became one of the leading citizens of Atchison. Besides establishing the foundry which became the center of the town's industry, he also owned the local theater, served on the school board, was elected to the Kansas Legislature in 1889, served on the Kansas Penitentiary Board, and was nominated for Governor of Kansas. He died on January 12, 1912.

In 1914, Harry Muchnic invented a revolutionary diesel locomotive piston ring. In 1924 the John Seaton Foundry built an electric arc melting furnace for efficient smelting. In 1924 Atchison began the transition from iron to steel which paved the transition from steam locomotives to diesel locomotives. The first steel locomotive truck assembly was designed, cast, and assembled in 1934. In 1938 LFM was making 18 locomotive assemblies every day for General Motors-Electric Motive Division (EMD) and continued to be a key supplier of components to EMD.

In 1958 Rockwell purchased the LFM Steel Foundry to make locomotive trucks for EMD and GM (Progress Rail). Rockwell's Transit Truck Design Group was established in 1960. Rockwell Manufacturing and Rockwell International were the owners from 1956 to 1993 and they renamed the LFM to Atchison Casting Corporation (ACC) in 1991. Atchison Casting became a publicly held corporation in 1994. ACC bought the Old Canadian Steel Foundry in Montreal, Canada from Hawker Siddeley in 1995. The foundry has primarily become a producer of rail transport components, including commuter rail truck frames for commuter rail systems in San Francisco, Chicago, Atlanta, and Washington, D.C. It has also undergone various mergers, reorganizations, and renamings, most recently after it was purchased by Bradken, a global manufacturing company headquartered in Australia.

== Geography ==
The city lies along the western bank of the Missouri River, which also marks the Kansas-Missouri state line. Located at the junction of U.S. Route 59 and U.S. Route 73, it is 21 miles (34 km) southwest of St. Joseph, Missouri, along US-59 and 25 miles (40 km) northwest of Leavenworth Kansas, along US-73. The section of US-73 between Atchison and Leavenworth is part of the Glacial Hills Scenic Byway, which follows K-7 northward from Atchison.

According to the United States Census Bureau, the city has a total area of 8.29 square miles (21.47 km^{2}), of which 7.83 square miles (20.28 km^{2}) is land and 0.46 square miles (1.19 km^{2}) is water.

=== Climate ===
Under the Köppen climate classification, Atchison falls within either a hot-summer humid continental climate (Dfa) if the 0 °C (32 °F) isotherm is used or a humid subtropical climate (Cfa) if the −3 °C (27 °F) isotherm is used. Over the course of a year, temperatures range from an average low of nearly 18.4 °F (−7.6 °C) in January to an average high of nearly 87.6 °F (30.9 °C) in July. The maximum temperature reaches 90 °F (32 °C) an average of 38 days per year and reaches 100 °F (38 °C) an average of three days per year. The minimum temperature falls below the freezing point (32 °F (0 °C)) an average of 107 days per year. Typically the first fall freeze occurs between the second week of October and the first week of November, and the last spring freeze occurs between the end of March and the third week of April.

The area receives nearly 36.38 in (924 mm) of precipitation during an average year, with the largest share being received in May, June, and July—with a combined 29 days of measurable precipitation. During a typical year the total amount of precipitation may be anywhere from 25 to 52 in (1,300 mm). There are on average 89 days of measurable precipitation per year. Winter snowfall averages almost 17 in (43 cm), but the median is less than 16 inches (410 mm). Measurable snowfall occurs an average of 10 days per year, with at least an inch of snow being received on six of those days. Snow depth of at least an inch occurs an average of 23 days per year.

Climate data for Atchison, Kansas (1991–2020 normals, extremes 1893–2009)
Month	Jan	Feb	Mar	Apr	May	Jun	Jul	Aug	Sep	Oct	Nov	Dec	Year
Record high °F (°C)	72 (22)	84 (29)	93 (34)	95 (35)	103 (39)	106 (41)	109 (43)	111 (44)	108 (42)	98 (37)	84 (29)	74 (23)	111 (44)
Mean daily maximum °F (°C)	36.2 (2.3)	41.6 (5.3)	54.0 (12.2)	65.0 (18.3)	74.4 (23.6)	83.7 (28.7)	87.6 (30.9)	86.4 (30.2)	78.9 (26.1)	66.6 (19.2)	51.9 (11.1)	40.1 (4.5)	63.9 (17.7)
Daily mean °F (°C)	27.3 (−2.6)	32.2 (0.1)	43.2 (6.2)	54.0 (12.2)	64.9 (18.3)	74.4 (23.6)	78.4 (25.8)	76.5 (24.7)	68.5 (20.3)	56.4 (13.6)	42.6 (5.9)	31.8 (−0.1)	54.2 (12.3)
Mean daily minimum °F (°C)	18.4 (−7.6)	22.8 (−5.1)	32.4 (0.2)	42.9 (6.1)	55.4 (13.0)	65.2 (18.4)	69.3 (20.7)	66.5 (19.2)	58.1 (14.5)	46.2 (7.9)	33.3 (0.7)	23.4 (−4.8)	44.5 (6.9)
Record low °F (°C)	−28 (−33)	−25 (−32)	−10 (−23)	8 (−13)	23 (−5)	40 (4)	46 (8)	43 (6)	30 (−1)	11 (−12)	−2 (−19)	−21 (−29)	−28 (−33)
Average precipitation inches (mm)	0.93 (24)	1.20 (30)	1.92 (49)	3.42 (87)	5.32 (135)	4.87 (124)	5.17 (131)	3.75 (95)	3.48 (88)	3.10 (79)	1.81 (46)	1.41 (36)	36.38 (924)
Average snowfall inches (cm)	5.0 (13)	4.8 (12)	1.8 (4.6)	0.4 (1.0)	0.0 (0.0)	0.0 (0.0)	0.0 (0.0)	0.0 (0.0)	0.0 (0.0)	0.3 (0.76)	0.9 (2.3)	3.8 (9.7)	17.0 (43)
Average precipitation days (≥ 0.01 in)	5.0	5.0	7.3	9.6	11.1	9.6	8.7	8.0	7.6	6.9	5.2	5.0	89.0
Average snowy days (≥ 0.1 in)	2.9	2.4	0.9	0.3	0.0	0.0	0.0	0.0	0.0	0.1	0.6	2.5	9.7
Source: NOAA

== Demographics ==
Historical population
Census	Pop.	Note	%±
1860	2,616		—
1870	7,054		169.6%
1880	15,105		114.1%
1890	13,963		−7.6%
1900	15,722		12.6%
1910	16,429		4.5%
1920	12,630		−23.1%
1930	13,024		3.1%
1940	12,648		−2.9%
1950	12,792		1.1%
1960	12,529		−2.1%
1970	12,565		0.3%
1980	11,407		−9.2%
1990	10,656		−6.6%
2000	10,232		−4.0%
2010	11,021		7.7%
2020	10,885		−1.2%
2023 (est.)	10,670		−2.0%
U.S. Decennial Census; 2010-2020

=== 2020 census ===
As of the 2020 census, Atchison had a population of 10,885, with 3,871 households and 2,255 families. The population density was 1,358.4 per square mile (524.5/km^{2}), and there were 4,361 housing units at an average density of 544.2 per square mile (210.1/km^{2}).

The median age was 31.7 years. 22.0% of residents were under the age of 18, 20.4% were from 18 to 24, 21.3% were from 25 to 44, 20.5% were from 45 to 64, and 15.7% were 65 years of age or older. For every 100 females there were 91.1 males, and for every 100 females age 18 and over there were 88.9 males age 18 and over.

97.9% of residents lived in urban areas, while 2.1% lived in rural areas.

Of all households, 28.7% had children under the age of 18 living in them, 39.2% were married-couple households, 21.9% were households with a male householder and no spouse or partner present, and 32.1% were households with a female householder and no spouse or partner present. About 36.4% of all households were made up of individuals, and 14.8% had someone living alone who was 65 years of age or older.

Of housing units, 11.2% were vacant. The homeowner vacancy rate was 2.5% and the rental vacancy rate was 11.3%.

Racial composition as of the 2020 census
Race	Number	Percent
White	8,962	82.3%
Black or African American	745	6.8%
American Indian and Alaska Native	60	0.6%
Asian	77	0.7%
Native Hawaiian and Other Pacific Islander	6	0.1%
Some other race	246	2.3%
Two or more races	789	7.2%
Hispanic or Latino (of any race)	511	4.7%

Non-Hispanic White residents were 80.89% of the population.

=== 2016–2020 ACS estimates ===
The 2016–2020 5-year American Community Survey estimates show that the median household income was $47,742 (with a margin of error of +/- $3,419) and the median family income was $60,939 (+/- $2,957). Males had a median income of $30,093 (+/- $6,798) versus $12,464 (+/- $4,601) for females. The median income for those above 16 years old was $17,399 (+/- $8,087).

The average household size was 2.4 and the average family size was 3.0. The percent of those with a bachelor's degree or higher was estimated to be 15.8% of the population. Approximately, 13.0% of families and 16.9% of the population were below the poverty line, including 12.7% of those under the age of 18 and 11.4% of those ages 65 or over.

=== 2010 census ===
As of the census of 2010, there were 11,021 people, 3,933 households, and 2,447 families residing in the city. The population density was 1,407.5 inhabitants per square mile (543.4/km^{2}). There were 4,442 housing units at an average density of 567.3 per square mile (219.0/km^{2}). The racial makeup of the city was 87.9% White, 7.2% African American, 0.6% Native American, 0.5% Asian, 0.1% Pacific Islander, 0.7% from other races, and 3.1% from two or more races. Hispanic or Latino of any race were 2.7% of the population.

There were 3,933 households, of which 33.0% had children under the age of 18 living with them, 43.0% were married couples living together, 13.9% had a female householder with no husband present, 5.3% had a male householder with no wife present, and 37.8% were non-families. 31.9% of all households were made up of individuals, and 13.2% had someone living alone who was 65 years of age or older. The average household size was 2.45 and the average family size was 3.08.

The median age in the city was 31.6 years. 23.7% of residents were under the age of 18; 18.6% were between the ages of 18 and 24; 20.9% were from 25 to 44; 22.2% were from 45 to 64; and 14.6% were 65 years of age or older. The gender makeup of the city was 47.2% male and 52.8% female.

== Education ==
=== Colleges ===
- Benedictine College
- Northeast Kansas Technical College
- Highland Community College Technical Center

=== Primary and secondary ===
The community is served by Atchison USD 409 public school district, which operates four schools, and serves more than 1,600 students. In 1997 the Atchison Public Schools closed six of its neighborhood school buildings to open one large elementary school. Although schools had been desegregated for more than 50 years, this move ensured more diversity and equality of education by uniting different segments of the city's children into one school. A few of the old neighborhood schools still stand - one, known as Lincoln school at 810 Division Street was historically a segregated school for black children. Many entities have attempted to restore Lincoln School, which is on the Kansas State Register of Historic Places.

- Atchison High School, grades 9–12
- Atchison Middle School, grades 6–8
- Atchison Elementary School, grades K–5
- Atchison Alternative School, grades 6–12

Private schools in the city include:

- Maur Hill Mount Academy
- Trinity Lutheran School
- St. Benedict Catholic School (was renamed from Atchison Catholic Elementary School in 2013)

== Notable people ==
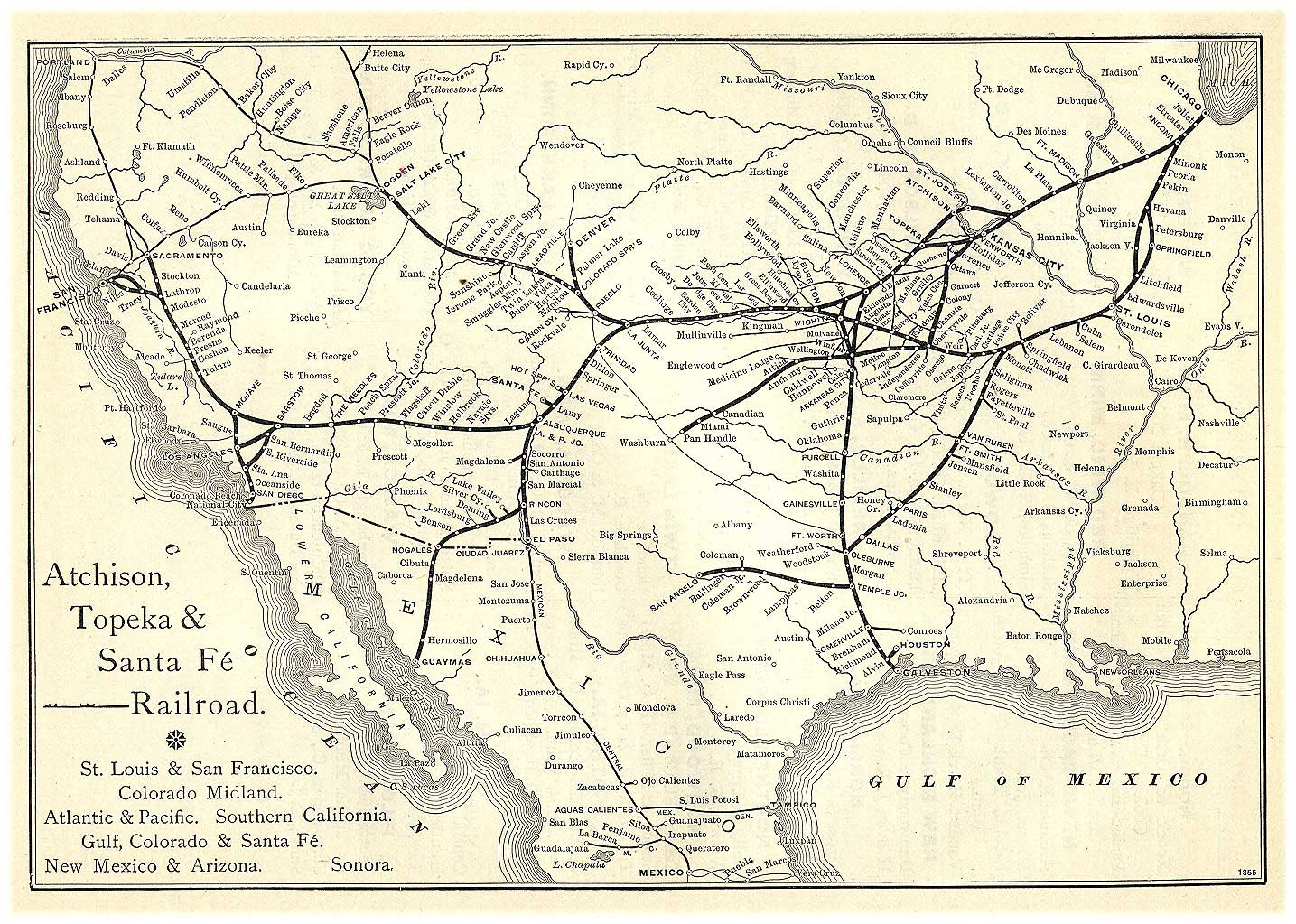
An Atchison, Topeka & Santa Fe Railway route map from 1891 issue of Grain Dealers and Shippers Gazetteer.

- Willis J. Bailey, U.S. Representative and 16th governor of the state.
- Frank L. Boyd (1881–1962), labor organizer with the Brotherhood of Sleeping Car Porters.
- Laura M. Cobb, United States Navy nurse during World War II.
- Amelia Earhart, aviator.
- Rory Lee Feek, songwriter and half of country duo Joey and Rory.
- James Carroll Fox, United States judge.
- George W. Glick, ninth governor of the state.
- Sheffield Ingalls, former lieutenant governor of Kansas.
- John James Ingalls, former state and U.S. senator who coined the state motto, Ad Astra per Aspera.
- James Edmund Jeffries, U.S. Congressman.
- Ernie Jennings, football player.
- Heavy Johnson, baseball player with Kansas City Monarchs.
- Victor Linley, Wisconsin State Senator.
- Paul Christoph Mangelsdorf, botanist known for his work on the origins of maize
- John Alexander Martin, 10th governor of the state.
- Chester L. Mize, U.S. Congressman.
- Harry Alexander Smith, US Army major general
- James M. Stanton, sixth bishop of the Episcopal Diocese of Dallas.
- Jesse Stone, American rhythm and blues musician and songwriter. Developed the basic rock 'n' roll sound.

== Points of interest ==
- National Register of Historic Places listings in Atchison County, Kansas
  - Amelia Earhart Birthplace Museum
  - Santa Fe Depot Rail Museum
- International Forest of Friendship, arboretum
- Sallie House, reportedly haunted house

== See also ==
- Atchison Storage Facility
- Central Branch Union Pacific Railroad
- Lewis and Clark Trail
- SS Atchison Victory
