= Alexander C. Mitchell =

American politician (1860–1911)

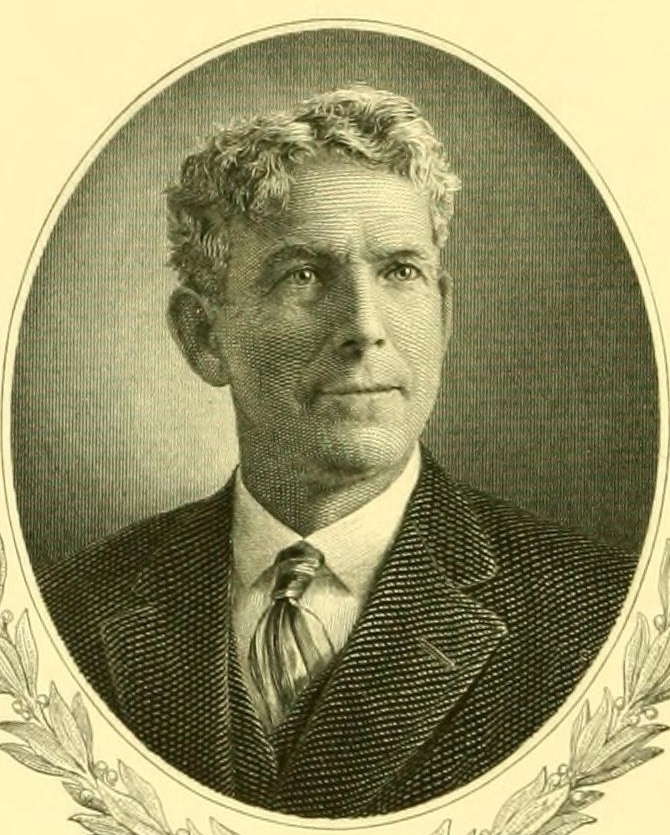

Member of the U.S. House of Representatives from Kansas's 2nd district
- In office March 4, 1911 – July 7, 1911
- Preceded by: Charles Frederick Scott
- Succeeded by: Joseph Taggart

Member of the Kansas House of Representatives
- In office 1907-1911

Personal details
- Born: October 11, 1860 Cincinnati, Ohio, U.S.
- Died: July 7, 1911 (aged 50) Lawrence, Kansas, U.S.
- Resting place: Oak Hill Cemetery; Lawrence, Kansas, U.S.
- Party: Republican

Alexander Clark Mitchell (October 11, 1860 – July 7, 1911) was a U.S. representative from Kansas.

Born in Cincinnati, Ohio, Mitchell moved to Kansas in 1867 with his parents, who settled in Douglas County, near Lawrence, Kansas. He attended the public schools, and was graduated from the law department of the University of Kansas at Lawrence in 1889. He was admitted to the bar the same year and commenced practice in Lawrence.

Mitchell served as prosecuting attorney of Douglas County 1894–1898, and as a member of the University of Kansas board of regents 1904-10. He served as a member of the State board of law examiners 1907-10, and was a member of the Kansas House of Representatives 1907-11. He was elected as a Republican to the Sixty-second Congress and served from March 4, 1911, until his death in Lawrence, Kansas, July 7, 1911, and was interred in Oak Hill Cemetery.

== See also ==
- List of members of the United States Congress who died in office (1900–1949)

U.S. House of Representatives
Preceded by Charles F. Scott	Member of the U.S. House of Representatives from Kansas's 2nd congressional district March 4, 1911 – July 7, 1911	Succeeded by Joseph Taggart
