= H. Murray-Jacoby =

American diplomat (1892–1955)

Herman Murray Jacoby was a diplomat and Latin American affairs specialist who served as the Ambassador Extraordinary to Abyssinia. He was born on November 25, 1892, in Bavaria, Germany, to a family of medical professionals, and died on January 27, 1955, at the age of 62 in Palm Beach County, Florida.

Jacoby was educated at the University of Berlin and Columbia University, and in 1920 he married Catherine Fairbanks Murray, and they had two daughters. Before 1930, he served as the chairman of the board of Associated Public Utilities Corp., president of the North American Water Works Corp., and a director of the Southern Cities Utilities Co. He also sat on the board of several insurance companies.

In 1930, Jacoby was appointed as the head of the diplomatic mission to Abyssinia, with the rank of ambassador extraordinary, and he attended the 1930 coronation of Tafari Makonnen as Hayla Sellase I as the personal representative of President Herbert Hoover. Jacoby served as an economic consultant to the Dominican Republic in 1934. In 1936, he compiled extensive reports for Secretary of War Harry H. Woodring while on a trip to Puerto Rico. In 1941, Jacoby was appointed as the commercial adviser to the Dominican Republic. He was the plenipotentiary delegate to the Inter-American Conference of American Republics on Financial and Economic Control in 1942, and he was one of the signatories of the final treaty of the Pan-American Union in Washington, D.C. In 1944, he served as an advisor in connection with the United Nations Monetary and Financial Conference.

Throughout his career, Jacoby was honored with numerous awards, including the Grand Cordon Order of Menelik from Abyssinia, the Official Order of Carlos Manuel de Cespedes from Cuba, the Commander of the Order of St. Sava from Yugoslavia, the Commander of the Order Juan Pablo Duarte from the Dominican Republic, and the Commander of the Order of Al Merito from Ecuador.
