= 1928 Kansas gubernatorial election =

- November 6, 1928
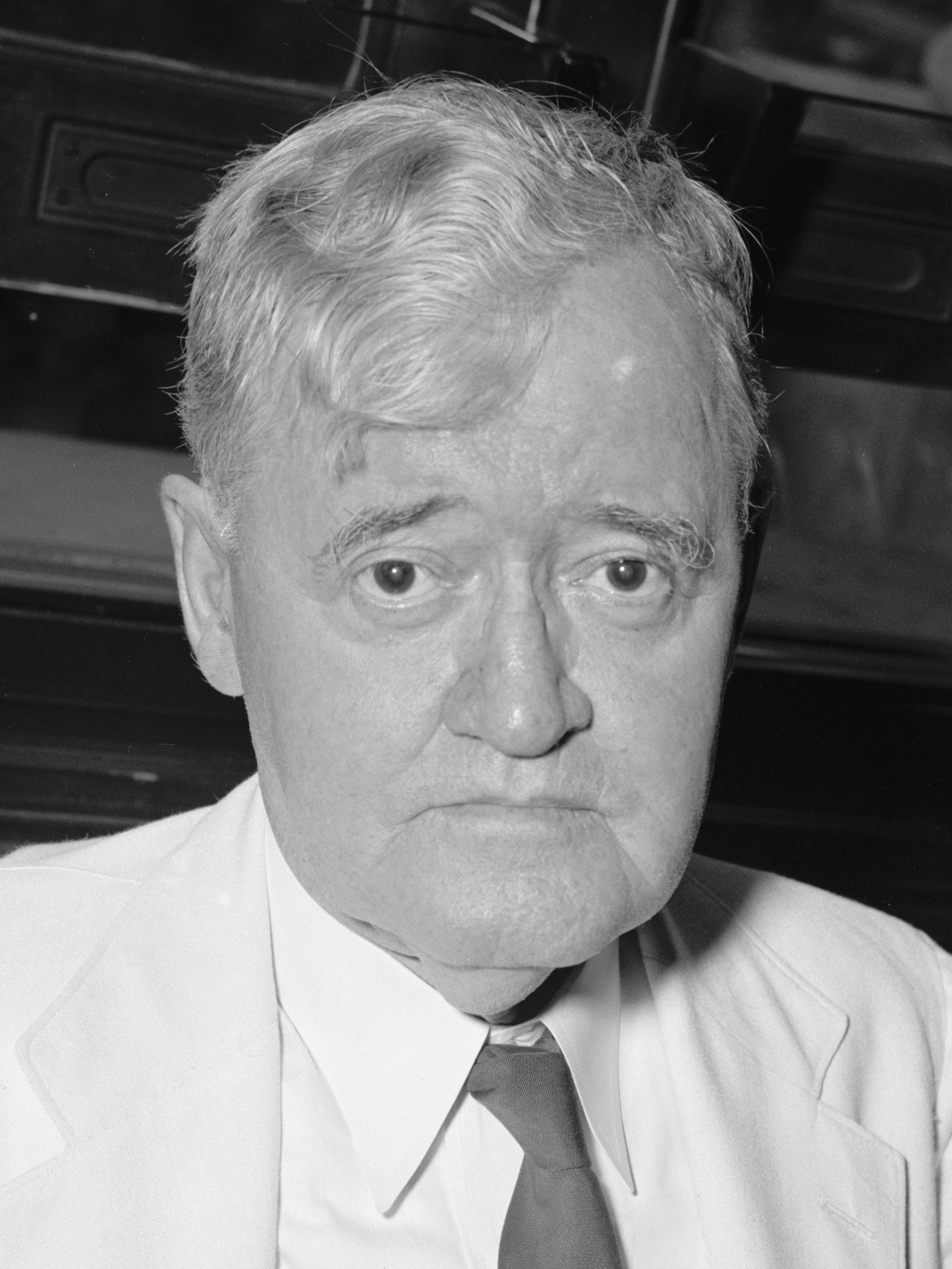

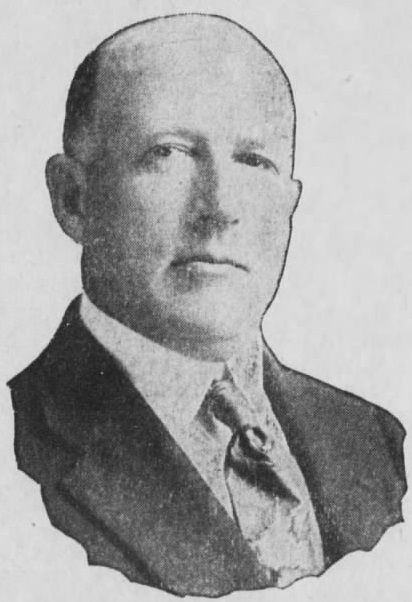
Nominee	Clyde M. Reed	Chauncey B. Little
Party	Republican	Democratic
Popular vote	433,395	219,327
Percentage	65.60%	33.20%
- County results Reed: 40–50% 50–60% 60–70% 70–80% Little: 60–70%
Governor before election
Benjamin S. Paulen
Republican
Elected Governor
Clyde M. Reed
Republican

The 1928 Kansas gubernatorial election was held on November 6, 1928. Republican nominee Clyde M. Reed, who defeated former representative Charles Frederick Scott, lieutenant governor De Lanson Alson Newton Chase, and Secretary of State Frank Joseph Ryan for the Republican nomination, defeated Democratic nominee Chauncey B. Little with 65.60% of the vote.

== General election ==
=== Candidates ===
Major party candidates

- Clyde M. Reed, Republican
- Chauncey B. Little, Democratic

Other candidates

- Henry L. Peterson, Socialist

=== Results ===
1928 Kansas gubernatorial election
Party	Candidate	Votes	%	±%
Republican	Clyde M. Reed	433,395	65.60%	
Democratic	Chauncey B. Little	219,327	33.20%	
Socialist	Henry L. Peterson	7,924	1.20%	
Majority		214,068		
Turnout				
Republican hold		Swing		
