= Alf Landon =

American politician (1887–1987)

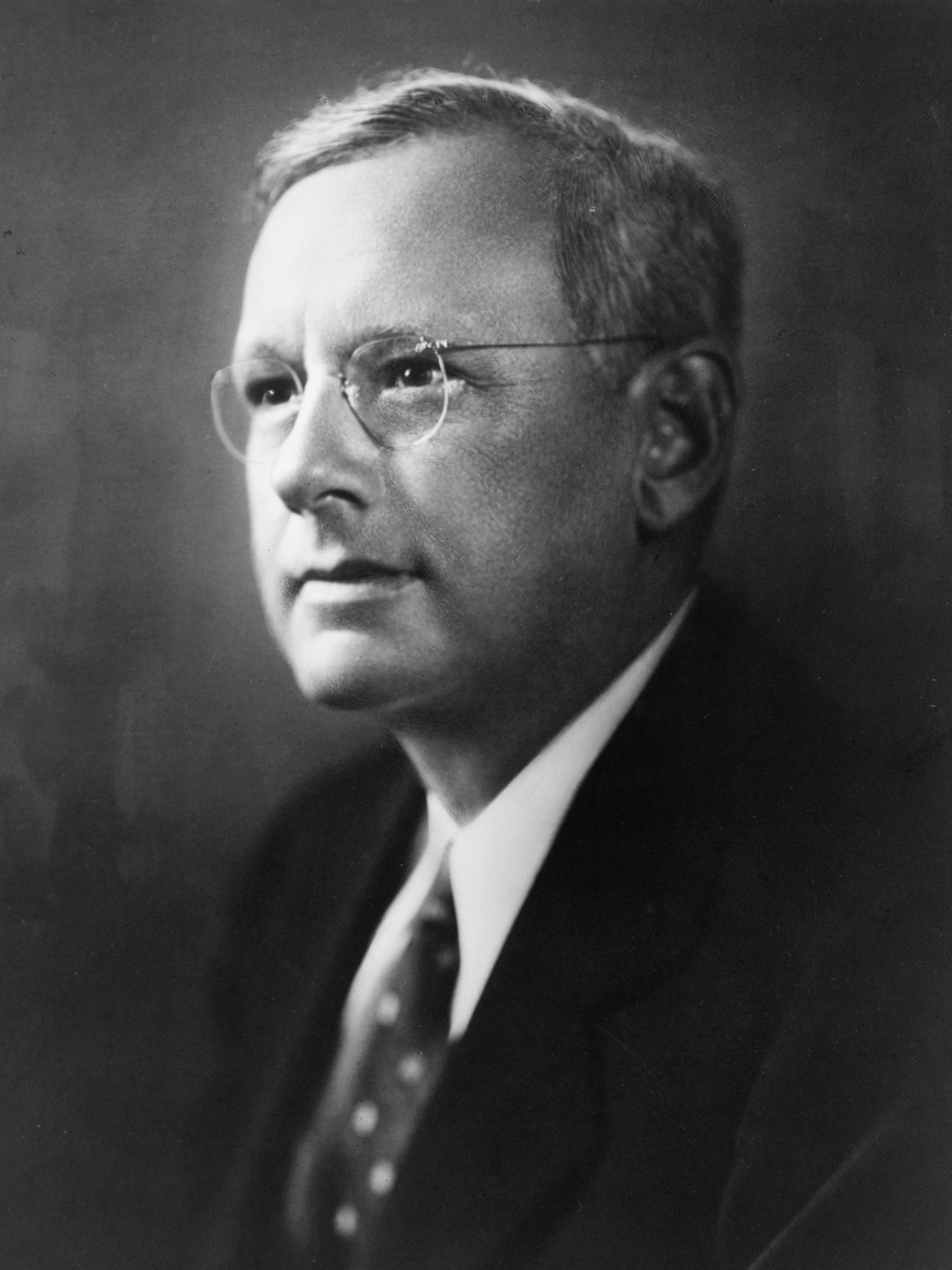
- Landon, c. 1936

26th Governor of Kansas
- In office January 9, 1933 – January 11, 1937
- Lieutenant: Charles Thompson
- Preceded by: Harry Woodring
- Succeeded by: Walter Huxman

Chairman of the Kansas Republican Party
- In office August 27, 1928 – August 26, 1930
- Preceded by: Seth G. Wells
- Succeeded by: John Hamilton

Personal details
- Born: Alfred Mossman Landon; September 9, 1887 West Middlesex, Pennsylvania, U.S.
- Died: October 12, 1987 (aged 100) Topeka, Kansas, U.S.
- Resting place: Mount Hope Cemetery, Topeka
- Party: Republican
- Other political affiliations: Progressive "Bull Moose"
- Spouses: Margaret Fleming (m. 1915; died 1918) Theo Cobb (m. 1930)
- Children: 4, including Nancy
- Education: University of Kansas (LLB)
- Profession: Oil producer

Military service
- Branch/service: United States Army
- Years of service: 1918–1919
- Rank: Captain
- Unit: Chemical Corps
- Battles/wars: World War I

Alfred Mossman Landon (September 9, 1887 – October 12, 1987) was an American oilman and politician who served as the 26th governor of Kansas from 1933 to 1937. A member of the Republican Party, he was the party's nominee in the 1936 presidential election, and was defeated in a landslide by incumbent president Franklin D. Roosevelt.

Born in West Middlesex, Pennsylvania, Landon spent most of his childhood in Marietta, Ohio, before moving to Kansas. After graduating from the University of Kansas, he became an independent oil producer in Lawrence, Kansas. His business made him a millionaire, and he became a leader of the liberal Republicans in Kansas. Landon won election as Governor of Kansas in 1932 and sought to reduce taxes and balance the budget in the midst of the Great Depression. He supported components of the New Deal but criticized aspects that he found inefficient.

The 1936 Republican National Convention selected Landon as the Republican Party's presidential nominee. He proved to be an ineffective campaigner and carried just two states in the election, neither of which was Kansas despite him being the sitting governor of that state. The margin of victory in the electoral college was the largest of Roosevelt's four elections to the office of president, as Landon won just 8 electoral votes to Roosevelt's 523.

Landon never sought public office again. Later in life, he supported the Marshall Plan and President Lyndon B. Johnson's Great Society programs. He gave the first in a series of lectures, now known as the Landon Lecture Series, at Kansas State University. Landon lived to the age of 100 and died in Topeka, Kansas, on October 12, 1987, becoming the only presidential candidate from either of the major parties to live to the age of 100 until Jimmy Carter in 2024, and is to date the only Republican candidate to do so. His daughter, Nancy Kassebaum, represented Kansas in the United States Senate from 1978 to 1997.

== Early life and education ==
Alfred Mossman Landon was born on September 9, 1887, in West Middlesex, Pennsylvania, the son of Anne Mossman and John Manuel Landon. Landon grew up in Marietta, Ohio. He moved with his family to Kansas at age 17 and graduated from the University of Kansas in 1908. Landon first pursued a career in banking, but in 1912 he became an independent petroleum producer in Independence, Kansas. During World War I, he joined the Army and was selected for assignment as an officer. He was commissioned in the Chemical Corps and attained the rank of captain. He was preparing to depart for France when the Armistice ended the war, so he was discharged and returned to Kansas.

By 1929, Landon's career in the oil industry had made him a millionaire, and he was instrumental in the establishment of the Kansas-Oklahoma division of the United States Oil and Gas Association, then known as the Mid-Continent Oil and Gas Association, a petroleum lobbying organization.

Landon was married to Margaret Fleming until her death in 1918.

== Career ==
Landon supported Theodore Roosevelt's Progressive Party in 1912, and by 1922, was private secretary to the governor of Kansas. He later became known as the leader of the liberal Republicans in the state. He was elected chairman of the Republican state central committee in 1928 and directed the successful Republican presidential and gubernatorial campaigns in Kansas in that year.

In 1930, however, incumbent Republican Kansas governor Clyde M. Reed failed to gain renomination, as he was defeated by challenger Frank Haucke, who would later go on to lose the general election to Harry H. Woodring. The election left the Kansas Republican Party damaged and divided. Landon decided to run in 1932 as a candidate who would reunite the Kansas GOP, and he won the nomination.

== Governorship (1933-1937) ==
Landon was elected Governor of Kansas in the general election, where he defeated both the incumbent Democrat Woodring and independent challenger John R. Brinkley in a closely contested race. He was re-elected governor in 1934, over Democrat Omar B. Ketchum (whose campaign was directed by Clyde Short); Gov. Frank Merriam of California and Landon were the only Republican governors in the nation to be re-elected that year. As governor, Landon gained a reputation for reducing taxes and balancing the budget. Landon is often described as a fiscal conservative who nevertheless believed that government must also address certain social issues. He supported parts of the New Deal and labor unions. Later in life, Landon would come out against Right-to-Work laws. Landon was opposed to segregation. When newly elected black party officials asked where their office space would be, Landon responded with "Right here with the rest of us."

During the 1932 presidential campaign, a degree of animosity developed between Landon and then U.S. President Herbert Hoover. Osro Cobb of Arkansas, a friend of both men, tried to bring about a reconciliation, as he explains in his memoirs:

For reasons I never understood, some friction developed between President Hoover and my friend, Governor Landon, who had a summer place in Evergreen, Colorado ... I was in and out of Colorado during the summers and visited frequently with Governor Landon. I was eager to get him and the President together in hopes of bringing about a reconciliation that would benefit them personally and the Republican Party. All of us were at the Broadmoor Hotel in Colorado Springs for a meeting, which I saw as an opportunity to get them together ... for dinner, but whatever undercurrent existed remained, and they continued to be cool toward each other. President Hoover was one of the great Americans of this century. He was competent, compassionate, and a man of unequaled qualifications. The country paid an awful price when he was sacrificed by political caprice.

During his gubernatorial years, Landon attempted to address the needs of his Depression-battered state while still advancing the Republican Party. After his speech at the Cleveland convention in 1936, Landon stated, "My chief concern in this crisis is to see the Republican Party name its strongest possible candidate and a man that would be a good president." During the election year, Landon called for a "special session of the Legislature to enact measures to bring Kansas within the requirements of the federal social security program."

=== 1936 presidential election ===
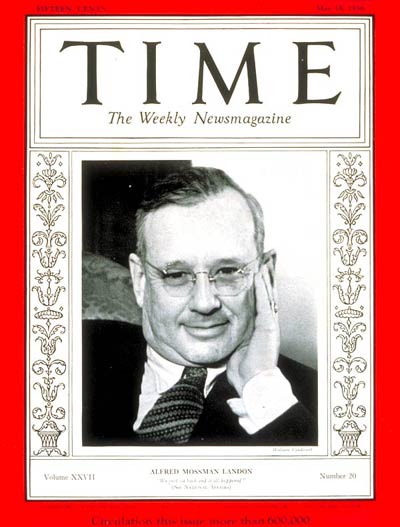
Cover of Time magazine, May 18, 1936

In 1936, Landon sought the Republican presidential nomination opposing the re-election of Franklin D. Roosevelt. At the 1936 Republican National Convention, Landon's campaign manager John Hamilton mobilized the younger elements of the party against the faction led by Herbert Hoover. Landon won the nomination on the first ballot; the convention selected Chicago newspaper publisher (and Roosevelt's future Secretary of the Navy) Frank Knox as his running mate.

Landon proved to be an ineffective campaigner who rarely traveled. Most of the attacks on Roosevelt and Social Security were developed by Republican campaigners rather than Landon himself. In the two months after his nomination he made no campaign appearances. As columnist Westbrook Pegler lampooned, "Considerable mystery surrounds the disappearance of Alfred M. Landon of Topeka, Kansas ... The Missing Persons Bureau has sent out an alarm bulletin bearing Mr. Landon's photograph and other particulars, and anyone having information of his whereabouts is asked to communicate direct with the Republican National Committee."

The Literary Digest conducted a large mail poll that incorrectly predicted Landon would defeat Roosevelt. The survey, based on responses from magazine subscribers, automobile owners, and telephone users, disproportionately represented wealthier Americans who tended to favor Landon, resulting in severe sampling bias. The poll’s publication created a false sense of momentum for Landon’s campaign and briefly boosted Republican morale, though it had little real effect on the election’s outcome, as Roosevelt went on to win in a landslide.

Landon respected and admired Roosevelt and accepted much of the New Deal but objected that it was hostile to business and involved too much waste and inefficiency. Late in the campaign, Landon accused Roosevelt of corruption – that is, of acquiring so much power that he was subverting the Constitution. Landon said:

The President spoke truly when he boasted ... 'We have built up new instruments of public power.' He spoke truly when he said these instruments could provide 'shackles for the liberties of the people ... and ... enslavement for the public.' These powers were granted with the understanding that they were only temporary. But after the powers had been obtained, and after the emergency was clearly over, we were told that another emergency would be created if the power was given up. In other words, the concentration of power in the hands of the President was not a question of temporary emergency. It was a question of permanent national policy. In my opinion the emergency of 1933 was a mere excuse ... National economic planning—the term used by this Administration to describe its policy—violates the basic ideals of the American system ... The price of economic planning is the loss of economic freedom. And economic freedom and personal liberty go hand in hand.

Also, while a believer in social justice and a strong supporter of social security, Landon spoke out against the Social Security Act of 1935, arguing that the legislation represented paternal government by making the assumption (as Landon put it) “that old age pensions are necessary because Americans lack the foresight to provide for their old age.”

The 1936 presidential election was extraordinarily lopsided. Although Landon accrued nearly seventeen million votes and obtained the endorsement of track star Jesse Owens, he lost the popular vote by more than 10 million votes. He lost his home state of Kansas and carried only Maine and Vermont for a total of eight electoral votes to Roosevelt's 523. On the same day, Republicans lost control of the Kansas governorship, as Democrat Walter A. Huxman was elected as his successor as governor. FDR's win was the most lopsided electoral victory since the 1820 election. The overwhelming Roosevelt victory prompted Democratic National Committee chair James Farley to jokingly update the political maxim "As Maine goes, so goes the nation" to "As Maine goes, so goes Vermont".

== Later life ==
Alf Landon in 1978, aged 90

Following his defeat, Landon finished out his term as Governor of Kansas and returned to the oil industry. Landon did not seek elected office again.

In 1938, he spoke out in defense of the First Amendment rights of one of his 1936 opponents, Norman Thomas. Mayor Frank Hague, a close FDR ally, had forced Thomas to leave Jersey City after he attempted to speak at a rally for free speech. The two men struck up a lifetime friendship. Landon hoped that the incident would "draw together all those who have common ideals of freedom and tolerance" and pledged to stand "shoulder to shoulder with you in this fight for free speech." Landon's comments portrayed the New Deal and Hague as closely aligned threats to free speech.

The Republicans' defeats in 1932 and 1936 plunged their party into a period of bitter intra-party strife. Landon played an important role in ending this internal bickering in 1938 by helping to prepare a new group of leaders for the presidential campaign of 1940, and in trying to bring about a compromise between the isolationist and internationalist viewpoints in foreign policy. Landon was in the American delegation led by Secretary of State Cordell Hull to the 1938 Pan-American Conference in Lima, Peru. However, Landon declined a position in Franklin Roosevelt's Cabinet because he made his acceptance contingent upon the President's renunciation of a third term.

After war broke out in Europe in 1939, Landon fought against isolationists such as America First Committee who supported the Neutrality Act; he feared it would mislead Nazi Germany into thinking the United States was unwilling to fight. In 1941, however, he joined isolationists in arguing against lend-lease, although he did urge that United Kingdom be given $5 billion outright instead.

After the war, he backed the Marshall Plan, while opposing high domestic spending. After the communist revolution in China, he was one of the first to advocate recognition of Mao Zedong's communist government, and its admission to the United Nations, when this was still a very unpopular position among the leadership and followers of both major parties.

In 1961, Landon urged the United States to join the European Common Market. In November 1962, when he was asked to describe his political philosophy, Landon said: "I would say practical progressive, which means that the Republican party or any political party has got to recognize the problems of a growing and complex industrial civilization. And I don't think the Republican party is really wide awake to that." Later in the 1960s, Landon backed President Lyndon Johnson on Medicare and other Great Society programs.

On December 13, 1966, Landon gave his first "Landon Lecture" at Kansas State University in Manhattan, Kansas. Landon's lecture, titled "New Challenges in International Relations" was the first in a series of public issues lectures that continues to this day and has featured numerous world leaders and political figures, including seven U.S. presidents (Richard Nixon, Gerald Ford, Jimmy Carter, Ronald Reagan, George H. W. Bush, Bill Clinton and George W. Bush).

Landon addressed the Republican National Convention in 1976 in Kansas City.

== Final year ==
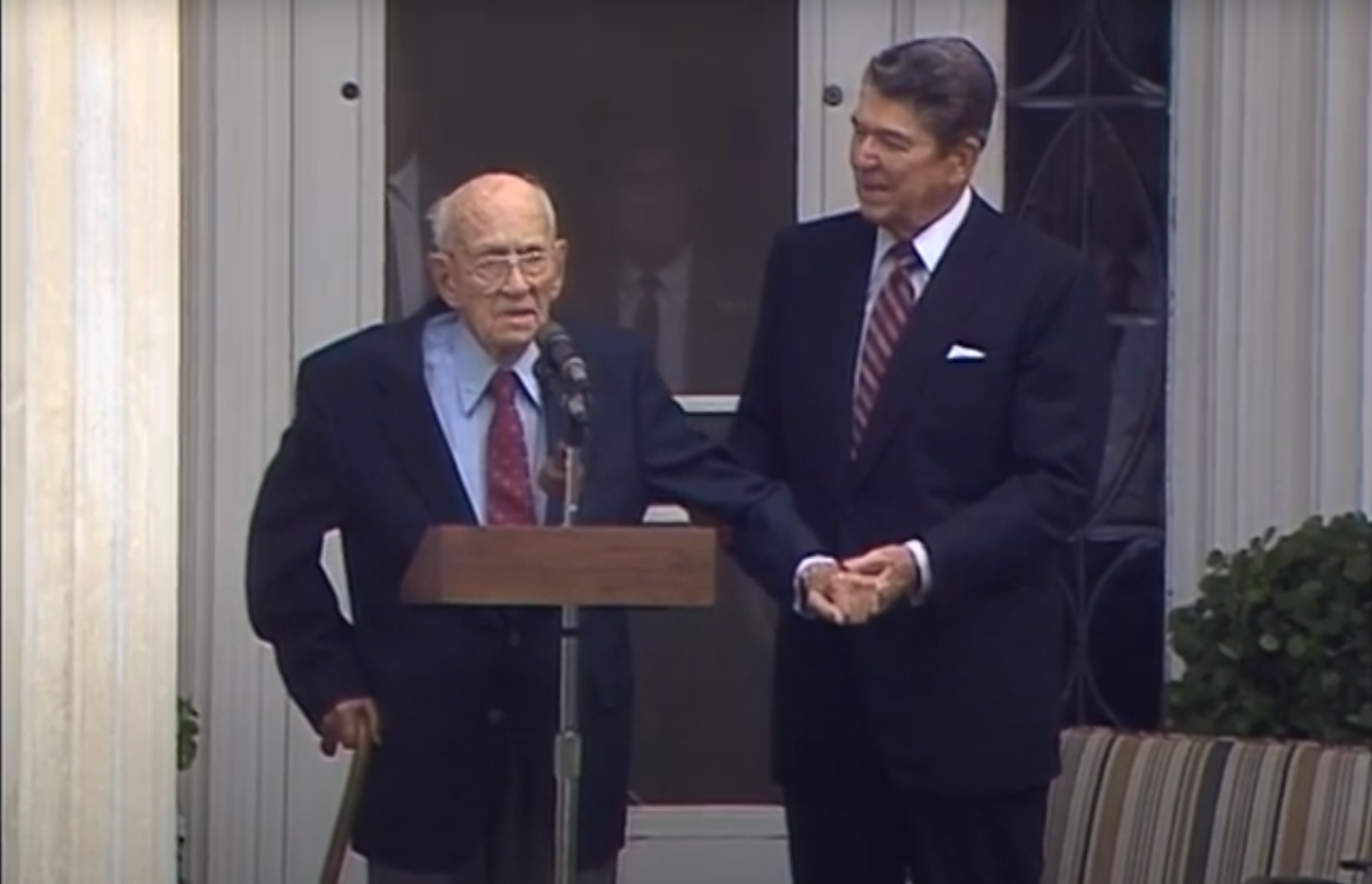
Alf Landon meeting U.S. President Ronald Reagan on September 6, 1987, three days before his 100th birthday and thirty-five days before his death.

President Ronald Reagan and his wife Nancy attended Landon's one-hundredth birthday party at his home in Topeka. Describing Landon as "the living soul of Kansas", the 76-year-old Reagan remarked, "You don't know what a joy it is for a fella like me to go to a birthday party for someone who can, in all honesty, call me a kid." Landon, standing with the use of a walking stick, told the President and well-wishers at the party, "It's a great day in my life. And it's a great day in the lives of all of us to have had the privilege that we have today of meeting with the President of the United States and Mrs. Reagan." White House Chief of Staff Howard Baker married Landon's daughter Nancy nine years later.

Nine days after his birthday, Landon was hospitalized at Stormant-Vail Regional Medical Center after complaining of internal pain. He was treated for a gallstone and a mild case of bronchitis and returned home on October 10. Landon died in Topeka on October 12, 1987, at 5:25 p.m., thirty-three days after celebrating his hundredth birthday, and is interred at Mount Hope Cemetery in Topeka. At the time of his death, he was survived by his second wife, Theo Cobb.

== Family ==
On January 7, 1915, Landon married Margaret Fleming of Oil City, Pennsylvania. They had one son and one daughter, both of whom they named after themselves, but the marriage only lasted three years, until the senior Margaret's death in 1918. The junior Alf died a week after birth. Landon then "devoted himself to managing his oil interests and raising his young daughter", remaining unmarried until January 15, 1930, when he married Theo Cobb, of Topeka, Kansas. They had one son and one daughter. Theo preferred to stay at home and raise the children rather than engaging in her husband's political efforts, later quipping about the 1936 presidential election that "Mrs. Roosevelt was doing enough traveling for both of us". Theo outlived Landon by nine years, dying in Topeka on July 21, 1996, at the age of 97.

Landon's daughter, Nancy Kassebaum, was a United States Senator from Kansas. Elected to the U.S. Senate in 1978, she was re-elected in 1984 and 1990. Her second husband was her former Senate colleague Howard Baker, of Tennessee (1925–2014). Landon's nephew was actor Hal Landon Jr.

== Electoral history ==
Kansas gubernatorial election, 1932

- Alf Landon (R) – 278,581 (34.82%)
- Harry Hines Woodring (D, Inc.) – 272,944 (34.12%)
- John Romulus Brinkley (I) – 244,607 (30.58%)

Republican primary for Governor of Kansas, 1934

- Alf Landon (Inc.) – 233,956 (79.87%)
- John Romulus Brinkley – 58,983 (20.14%)

Kansas gubernatorial election, 1934

- Alf Landon (R, Inc.) – 422,030 (53.51%)
- Omar B. Ketchum (D) – 359,877 (45.63%)
- George M. Whiteside (Socialist) – 6,744 (0.86%)

Republican presidential primaries, 1936

- William E. Borah – 1,478,676 (44.48%)
- Alf Landon – 729,908 (21.96%)
- Frank Knox – 527,054 (15.85%)
- Earl Warren – 350,917 (10.56%)
- Stephen A. Day – 155,732 (4.69%)
- Warren E. Green – 44,518 (1.34%)
- Leo J. Chassee – 18,986 (0.57%)
- Herbert Hoover – 7,750 (0.23%)
- Frederick Steiwer – 3,285 (0.10%)
- Franklin D. Roosevelt (write-in) – 1,159 (0.04%)

1936 Republican National Convention

- Alf Landon – 984 (98.11%)
- William E. Borah – 19 (1.89%)

1936 United States presidential election

- Franklin D. Roosevelt/John Nance Garner (Democratic) – 27,752,648 (60.8%) and 523 electoral votes (46 states carried)
- Alf Landon/Frank Knox (Republican) – 16,681,862 (36.5%) and 8 electoral votes (2 states carried)
- William Lemke/Thomas C. O'Brien (Union) – 892,378 (2.0%) and 0 electoral votes
- Norman Thomas/George A. Nelson (Socialist) – 187,910 (0.4%) and 0 electoral votes
- Earl Browder/James W. Ford (Communist) – 79,315 (0.2%) and 0 electoral votes
- Others – 53,586 (0.1%) and 0 electoral votes

Party political offices
Preceded by Frank Haucke	Republican nominee for Governor of Kansas; 1932, 1934	Succeeded by Will West
Preceded by Herbert Hoover	Republican nominee for President of the United States; 1936	Succeeded by Wendell Willkie
Political offices
Preceded by Harry Woodring	Governor of Kansas; 1933–1937	Succeeded by Walter Huxman
