= Joseph Taggart =

American politician

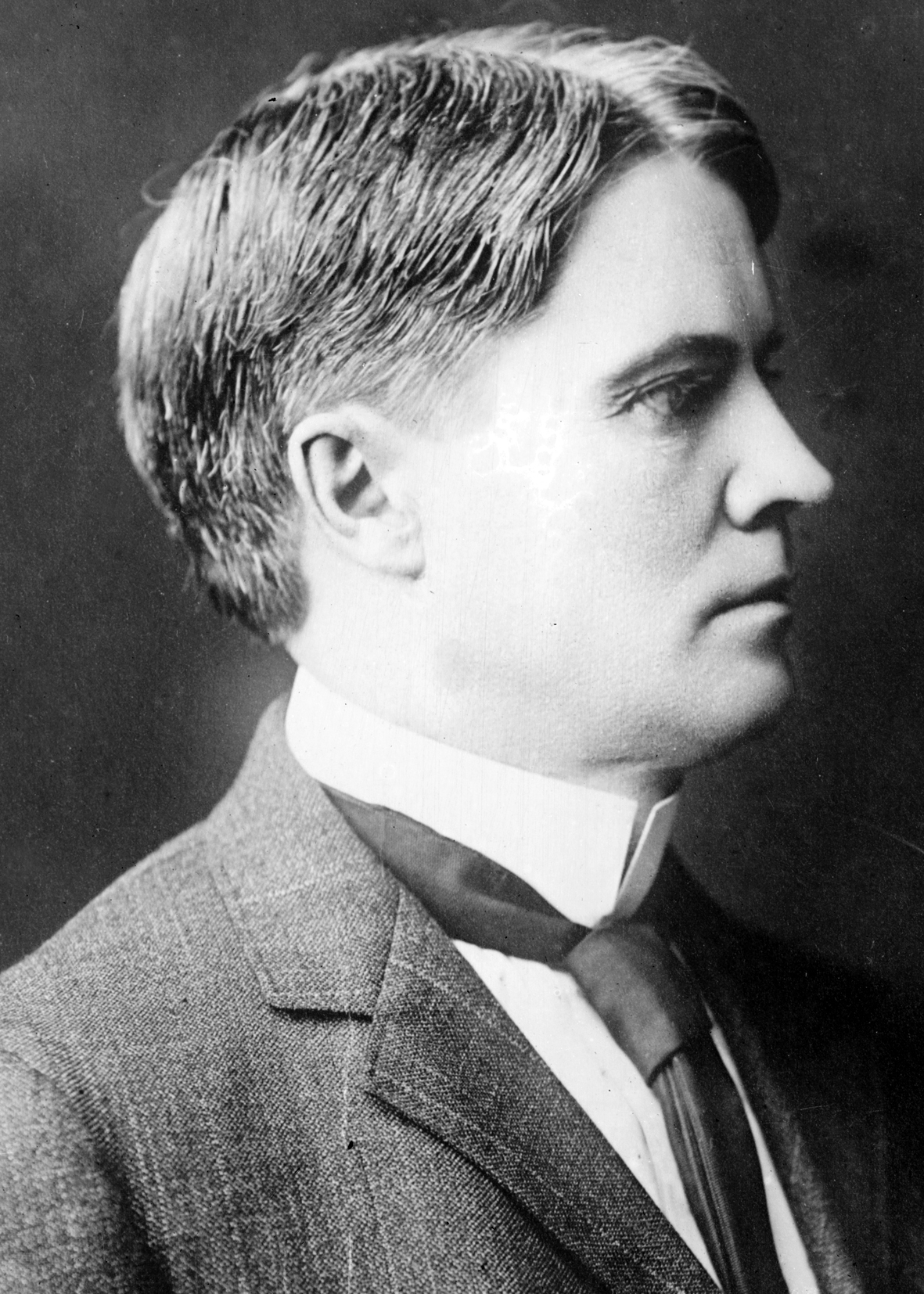

Member of the U.S. House of Representatives from Kansas's 2nd district
- In office November 7, 1911 – March 3, 1917
- Preceded by: Alexander C. Mitchell
- Succeeded by: Edward C. Little

Personal details
- Born: June 15, 1867 Waukon, Iowa, U.S.
- Died: December 3, 1938 (aged 71) Wadsworth, Kansas, U.S.
- Party: Democratic

Military service
- Allegiance: United States of America
- Branch/service: United States Army
- Unit: Quartermaster Corps
- Battles/wars: World War I

Joseph Taggart (June 15, 1867 – December 3, 1938) was a lawyer and a Democratic member of the U.S. House of Representatives, representing the 2nd Congressional District of Kansas from November 7, 1911, to March 3, 1917.

He was born near Waukon, Iowa, the son of John and Bridget (née McDavitt) Taggart. His mother died when he was an infant. He moved with his father to Saline County, Kansas in 1885, and attended Salina Normal University in Salina, graduating in 1890. He taught school in nearby Bavaria in 1892 and 1893, studying law during his evenings and vacations. He was admitted to the bar in 1893, and practiced law in Salina for several years before moving to Kansas City, Kansas in 1900.

Four years later he was the Democratic nominee for Wyandotte County, losing in a close election. He won the office two years later, and was re-elected in 1908 and 1910. He was elected in 1911 to the U.S. House of Representatives, filling a vacancy caused by the death of Alexander C. Mitchell, and was reelected twice.

He served in the Quartermaster Corps of the United States Army during World War I, then resumed his law practice in Kansas City. He was appointed judge of the controversial Kansas Court of Industrial Relations in 1924, serving during its last year of existence.

== Death ==
Taggart died in Wadsworth, Kansas, and is buried in Mount Vernon Cemetery, Atchison, Kansas.

== Legacy ==
A pin oak planted in 1917 on the East Grounds of the U.S. Capitol to honor Taggart was assessed as "in poor condition and in decline" by the Architect of the Capitol. It was located at the planned entrance to a new subterranean Capitol Visitor Center scheduled to open in 2006. It was chopped down in 2002, with plans to plant a replacement memorial elsewhere on the Capitol grounds.

== External links and sources ==
- United States Congress. "Joseph Taggart (id: T000011)". Biographical Directory of the United States Congress.
- Biography, from History of Wyandotte County Kansas and its people (published in 1911), transcription hosted by the Kansas State Library
- Memorial tree on Capitol grounds:
  - Capitol Visitor Center Tree Facts, mentioning the assessment of the Taggart memorial tree
  - Subterranean visitor center taking shape, an AP news article from the CNN website mentioning the Taggart memorial tree

U.S. House of Representatives
Preceded by Alexander C. Mitchell	Member of the U.S. House of Representatives from Kansas's 2nd congressional district November 7, 1911 – March 3, 1917	Succeeded by Edward C. Little
