= U. S. Guyer =

American politician (1868–1943)

Ulysses Samuel Guyer
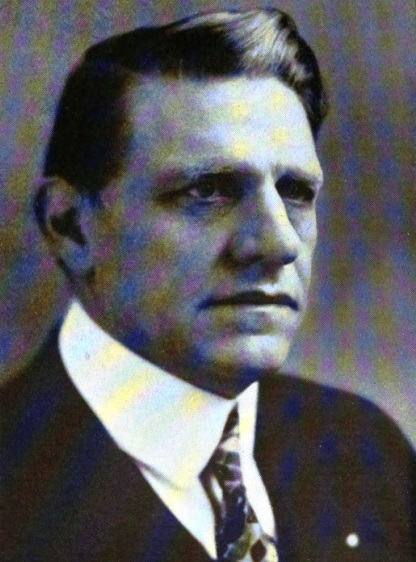

Member of the U.S. House of Representatives from Kansas's 2nd district
- In office March 4, 1927 – June 5, 1943
- Preceded by: Chauncey B. Little
- Succeeded by: Errett P. Scrivner
- In office November 4, 1924 – March 3, 1925
- Preceded by: Edward C. Little
- Succeeded by: Chauncey B. Little

Mayor of Kansas City, Kansas
- In office 1909–1910
- Preceded by: Dudley E. Cornell
- Succeeded by: James E. Porter

Personal details
- Born: Ulysses Samuel Guyer; December 13, 1868 Paw Paw, Illinois, U.S.
- Died: June 5, 1943 (aged 74) Bethesda, Maryland, U.S.
- Party: Republican

Ulysses Samuel Guyer (December 13, 1868 – June 5, 1943) was a U.S. representative from Kansas.

Born near Paw Paw, Illinois, Guyer attended the public schools, Lane University at Lecompton, Kansas, and the University of Kansas School of Law at Lawrence, Kansas. He was admitted to the bar in 1902 and commenced practice in Kansas City, Kansas. He served as judge of the first division city court of Kansas City from 1907 to 1909. He served as mayor of Kansas City, Kansas from 1909 to 1910.

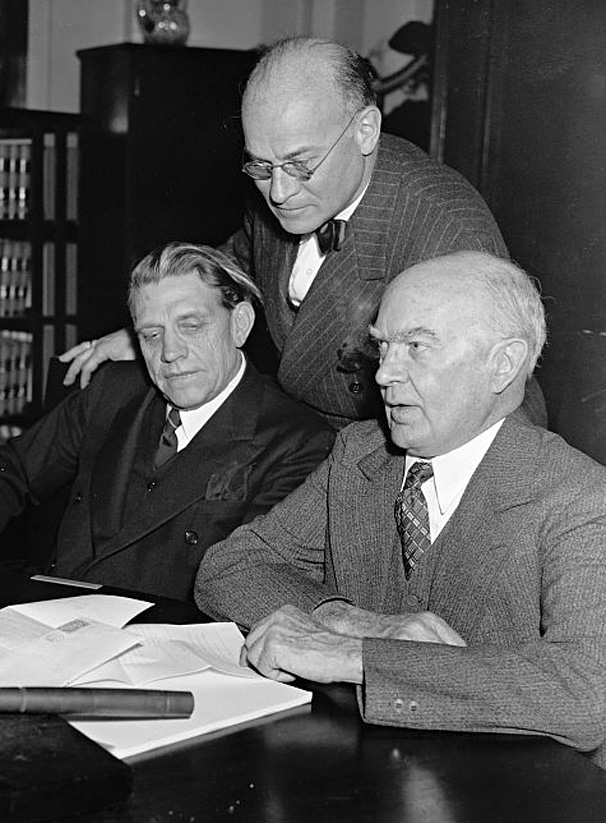
Guyer with Emanuel Celler, and Hatton W. Sumners.

Guyer was elected as a Republican to the Sixty-eighth Congress to fill the vacancy caused by the death of Edward C. Little and served from November 4, 1924, to March 3, 1925. He was not a candidate for election for the full term in 1924. He resumed the practice of law in Kansas City.

He was re-elected to the Seventieth and to the eight succeeding Congresses and served from March 4, 1927, until his death. He was one of the managers appointed by the United States House of Representatives in 1933 to conduct the impeachment proceedings against Harold Louderback, judge of the United States District Court for the Northern District of California. He died in Bethesda, Maryland on June 5, 1943. Among the items in his estate was a 40-volume personal diary he had kept for many years.

== See also ==
- List of members of the United States Congress who died in office (1900–1949)

U.S. House of Representatives
Preceded by Edward C. Little	Member of the U.S. House of Representatives from Kansas's 2nd congressional district November 4, 1924 – March 3, 1925	Succeeded by Chauncey B. Little
Preceded by Chauncey B. Little	Member of the U.S. House of Representatives from Kansas's 2nd congressional district March 4, 1927 – June 5, 1943	Succeeded by Errett P. Scrivner
