= 1944 United States Senate election in Kansas =

- November 7, 1944
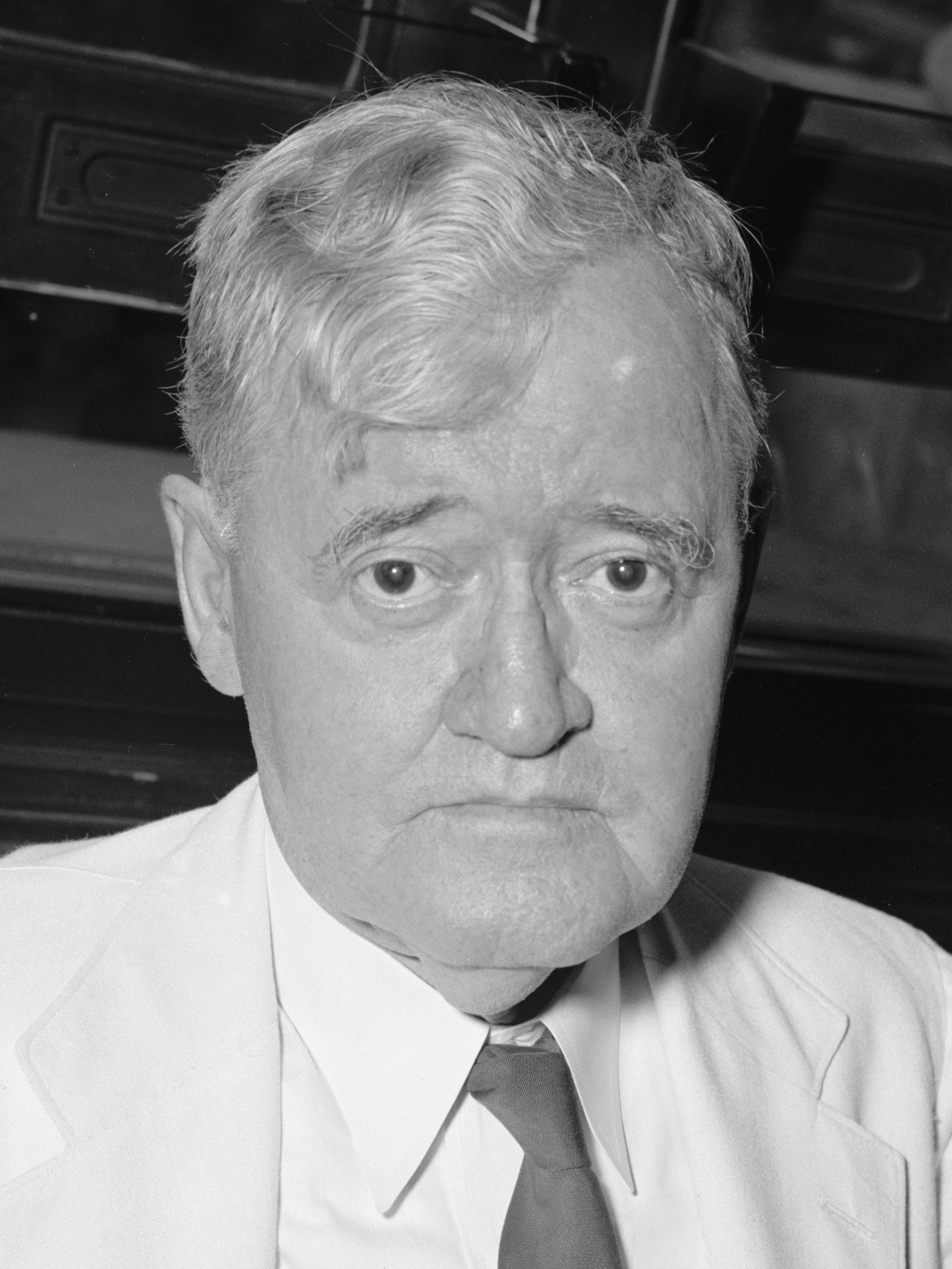

Nominee	Clyde M. Reed	Thurman Hill
Party	Republican	Democratic
Popular vote	387,090	272,053
Percentage	57.84%	40.65%
- County results Reed: 50–60% 60–70% 70–80% Hill: 50–60%
U.S. senator before election
Clyde M. Reed
Republican
Elected U.S. Senator
Clyde M. Reed
Republican

The 1944 United States Senate election in Kansas was held on November 7, 1944. Incumbent Republican Senator Clyde M. Reed ran for re-election to a second term. He was initially challenged by former Senator George McGill, whom he had defeated in 1938. However, after winning the Democratic nomination, McGill withdrew from the race to accept an appointment to the U.S. Tariff Commission. McGill was replaced as the Democratic nominee by Thurman Hill, an Independence attorney and former Public Service Commissioner. Reed defeated Hill in a landslide as Republican presidential nominee Thomas E. Dewey handily won the state over President Franklin D. Roosevelt.

== Democratic primary ==
=== Candidates ===
- George McGill, former U.S. Senator

=== Results ===
Democratic primary results
Party	Candidate	Votes	%
Democratic	George McGill	40,568	100.00%
Total votes		40,568	100.00%

After McGill won the primary, he withdrew from the race upon his nomination to the U.S. Tariff Commission. He was replaced as the Democratic nominee by Thurman Hill, an attorney from Independence, former member of the Kansas Public Service Commission, and counsel to the U.S. Department of the Treasury.

== Republican primary ==
=== Candidates ===
- Clyde M. Reed, incumbent U.S. Senator
- Carl E. Friend, former Lieutenant Governor of Kansas
- Chauncey Dewey, Brewster rancher

=== Results ===
Republican primary results
Party	Candidate	Votes	%
Republican	Clyde M. Reed (inc.)	86,107	55.89%
Republican	Carl E. Friend	54,490	35.37%
Republican	C. Dewey	13,460	8.74%
Total votes		154,057	100.00%

== Prohibition primary ==
=== Candidates ===
- L. B. Dubbs

=== Results ===
Prohibition primary results
Party	Candidate	Votes	%
Prohibition	L. B. Dubbs	116	100.00%
Total votes		116	100.00%

== Socialist primary ==
=== Candidates ===
- Arthur Goodwin Billings

=== Results ===
Socialist primary results
Party	Candidate	Votes	%
Socialist	Arthur Goodwin Billings	26	100.00%
Total votes		26	100.00%

== General election ==
=== Results ===
1944 United States Senate election in Kansas
Party	Candidate	Votes	%	±%
Republican	Clyde M. Reed (inc.)	387,090	57.84%	+1.64%
Democratic	Thurman Hill	272,053	40.65%	−3.13%
Socialist	Arthur Goodwin Billings	2,374	0.35%	—
Prohibition	L. B. Dubbs	7,674	1.15%	—
Majority		115,037	17.19%	+4.76%
Total votes		669,191	100.00%	
Republican hold				

== See also ==
- 1944 United States Senate elections
