= Edward C. Little =

American politician (1858–1924)

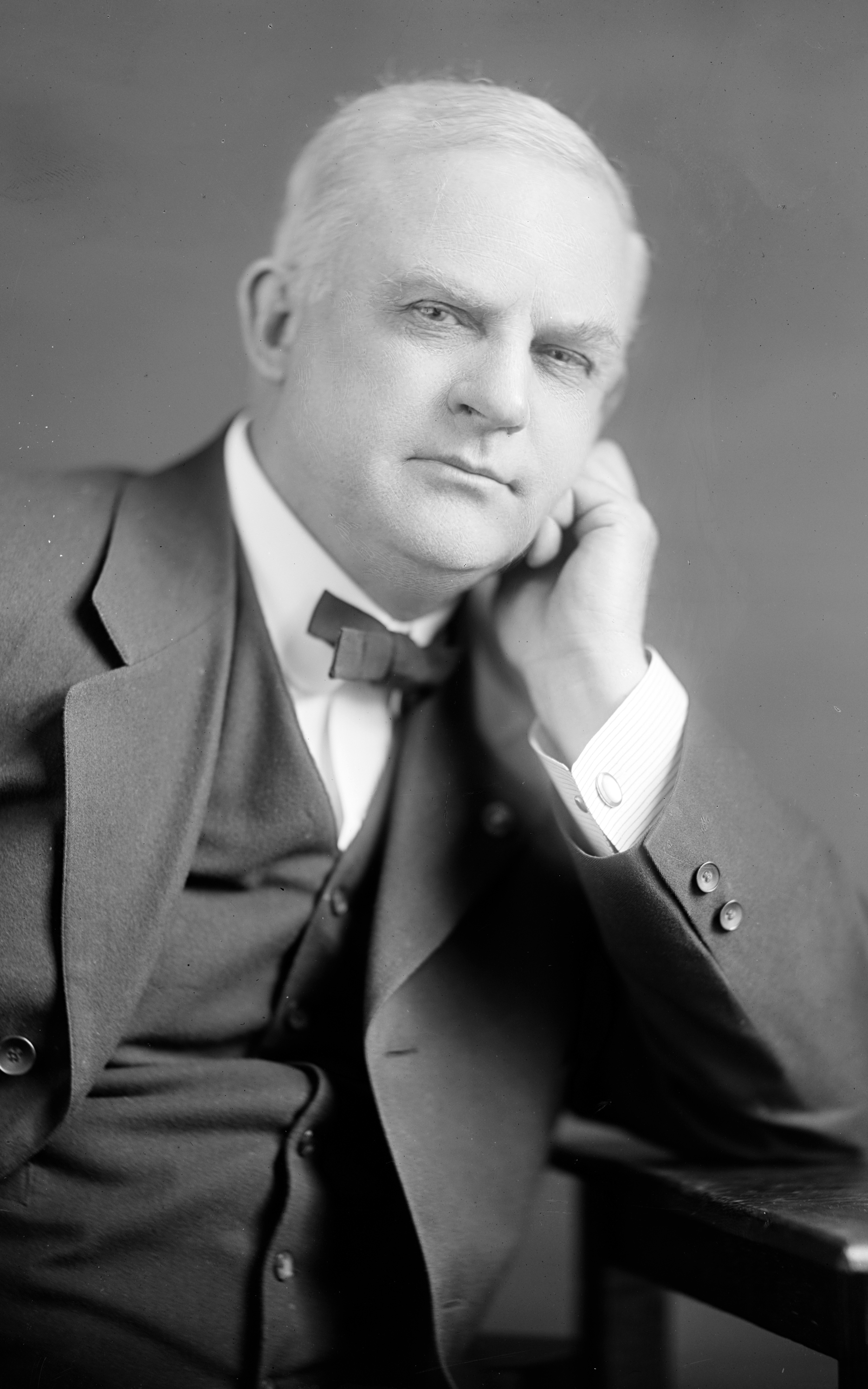
- Little, 1905–1924

United States Diplomatic Agent to Egypt
- In office November 15, 1892 – April 22, 1893
- President: Benjamin Harrison
- Preceded by: John A. Anderson
- Succeeded by: Frederic Courtland Penfield

Member of the U.S. House of Representatives from Kansas's 2nd district
- In office March 4, 1917 – June 27, 1924
- Preceded by: Joseph Taggart
- Succeeded by: U. S. Guyer

Personal details
- Born: December 14, 1858 Newark, Ohio, U.S.
- Died: June 27, 1924 (aged 65) Washington, D.C., U.S.
- Party: Republican
- Awards: Spanish War Service Medal; Philippine Campaign Medal

Military service
- Allegiance: United States of America
- Branch/service: United States Army
- Years of service: 1898–1899
- Rank: Lieutenant colonel
- Unit: 12th Regiment, Kansas Volunteers
- Battles/wars: Spanish–American War

Edward Campbell Little (December 14, 1858 – June 27, 1924) was a U.S. representative from Kansas.

== Life ==
Born in Newark, Ohio, Little moved to Kansas in 1866 with his parents, who settled in Olathe. He attended the public schools of Abilene, Kansas, and graduated from the University of Kansas in Lawrence in 1883. For several years, he was connected with the Santa Fe Railroad. After studying law, he was admitted to the bar in 1886 and commenced practice in Lawrence.

Little served as chairman of the Republican State convention in 1888. In 1889, he was the city attorney of Ness City, and from 1890 to 1892, he was prosecuting attorney of Dickinson County. He served as delegate at large to the Republican National Convention in 1892.

In 1892 and 1893, Little was Minister Resident to Egypt. In 1896 and 1897, he was the private secretary of Governor John W. Leedy. He unsuccessfully ran for senator in 1897. During the Spanish–American War, from 1898 to 1899, he was lieutenant colonel of the Twentieth Regiment, Kansas Volunteers. This service earned him the Spanish War Service Medal, and the Philippine Campaign Medal. In 1908, he settled in Kansas City, Kansas.

Little was elected to the Sixty-fifth and to the three succeeding Congresses, from Kansas's 2nd congressional district, and served from March 4, 1917, until his death in Washington, D.C., on June 27, 1924.

In the Sixty-sixth through Sixty-eighth Congresses, he was chairman of the Committee on Revision of Laws. He was one of the 50 representatives who on April 5, 1917 voted against declaring war on Germany

Little is buried in the City Cemetery of Abilene, Kansas.

== See also ==
- List of members of the United States Congress who died in office (1900–1949)

U.S. House of Representatives
Preceded by Joseph Taggart	Member of the U.S. House of Representatives from Kansas's 2nd congressional district March 4, 1917 – June 27, 1924	Succeeded by Ulysses S. Guyer
