= 1932 Kansas gubernatorial election =

- November 8, 1932
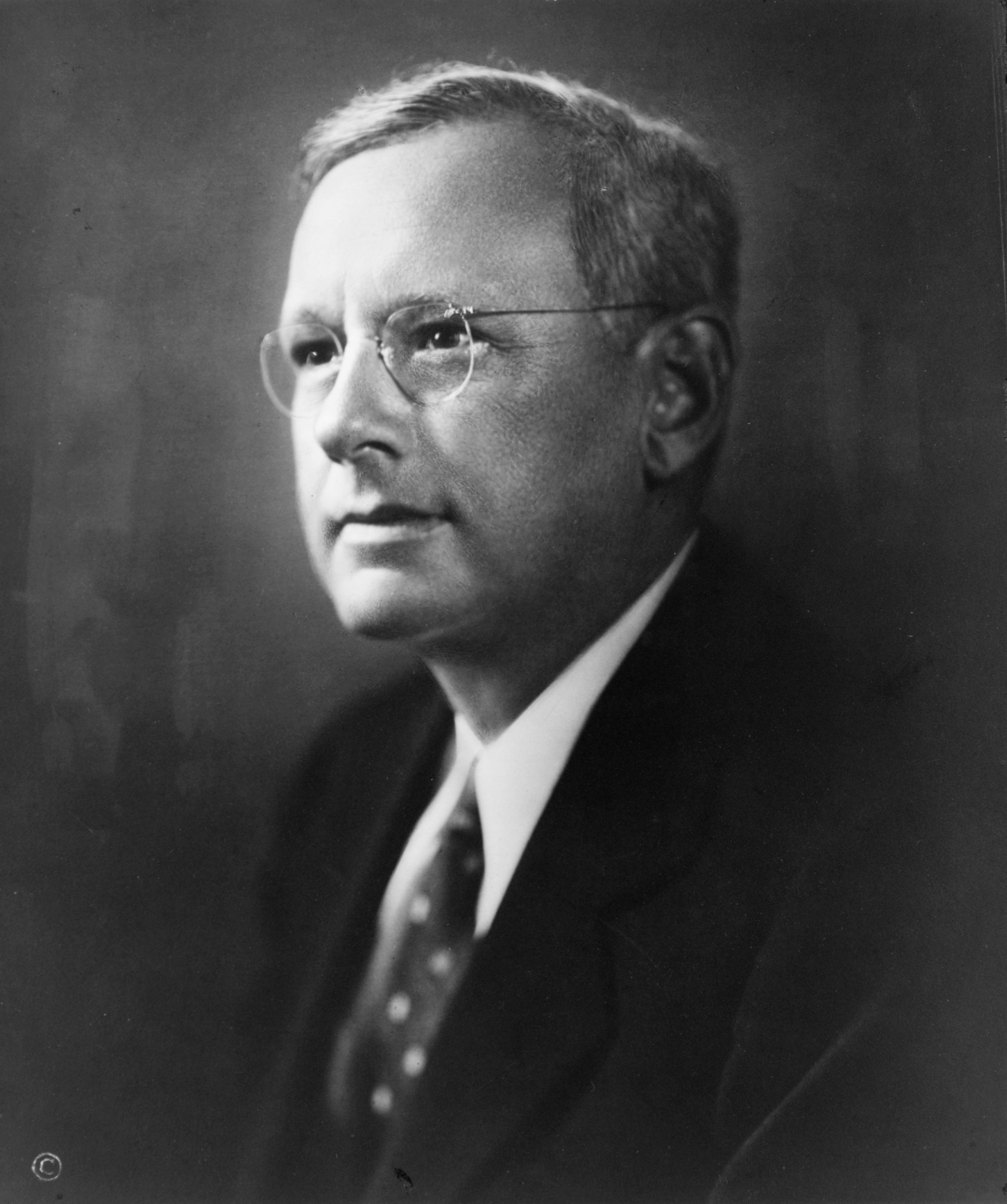

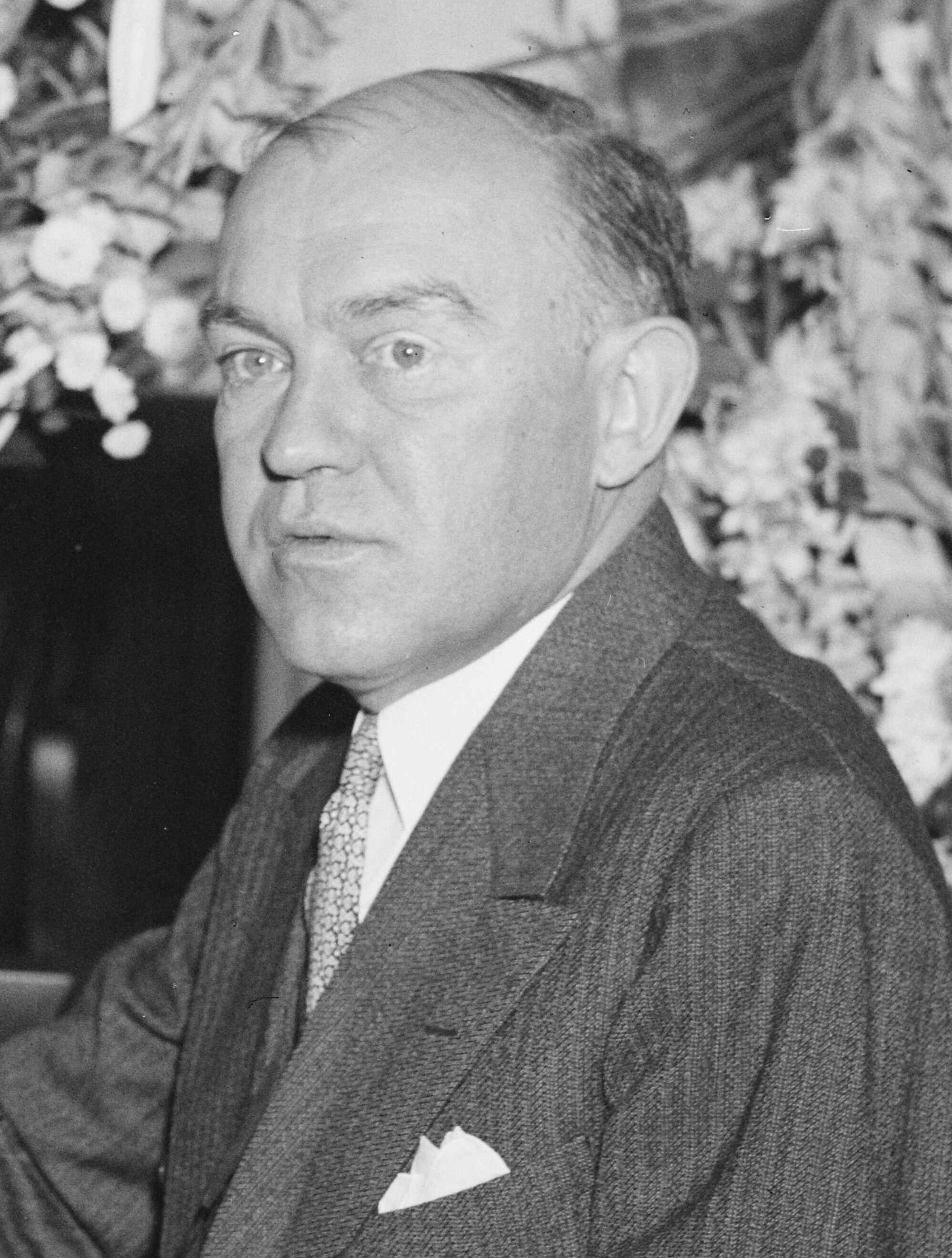

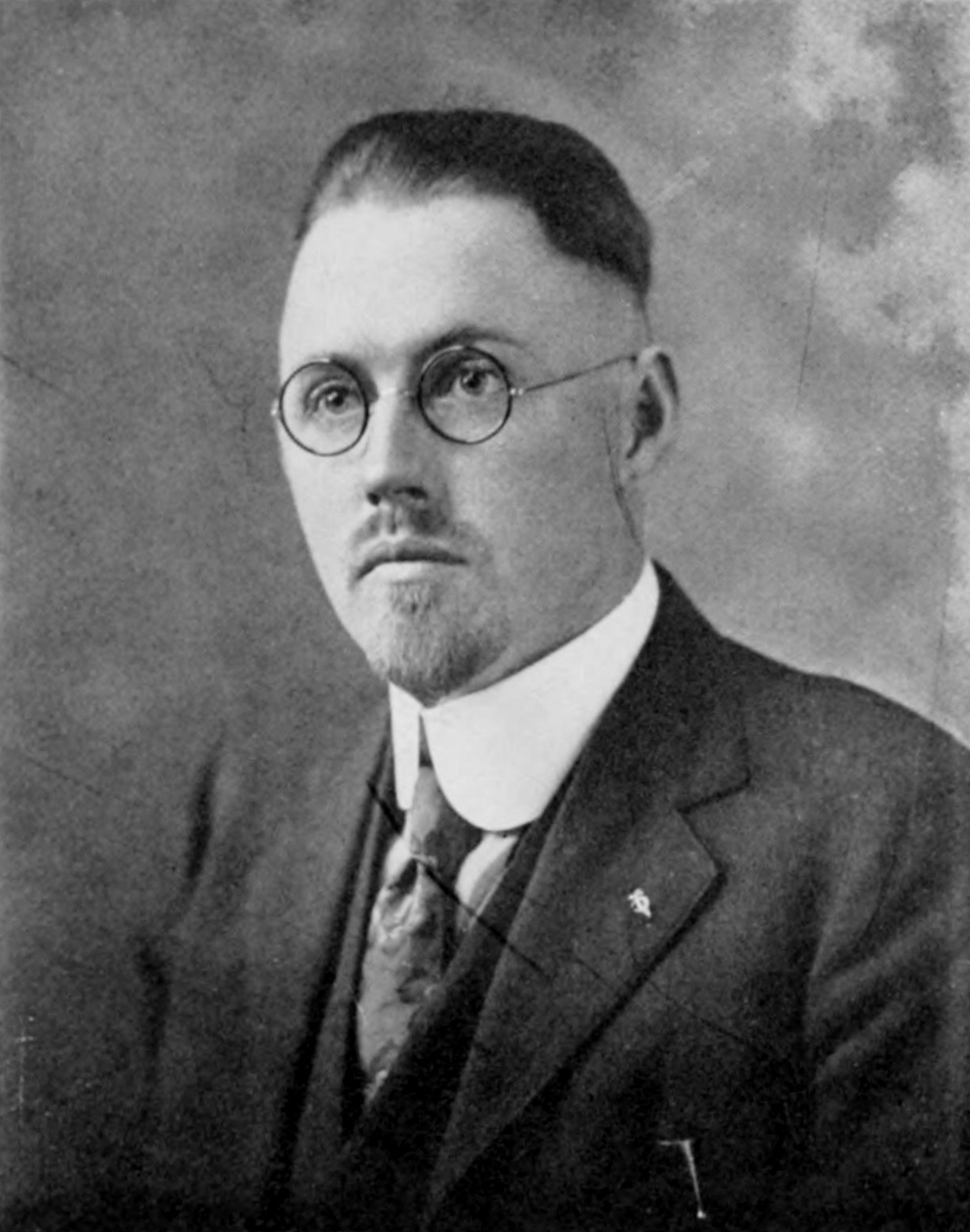
Candidate	Alf Landon	Harry H. Woodring	John R. Brinkley
Party	Republican	Democratic	Independent
Popular vote	278,581	272,944	244,607
Percentage	34.82%	34.12%	30.58%
- County results Landon: 30–40% 40–50% Woodring: 30–40% 40–50% 50–60% Brinkley: 30–40% 40–50% 50–60%
Governor before election
Harry Woodring
Democratic
Elected Governor
Alf Landon
Republican

The 1932 Kansas gubernatorial election took place on November 8, 1932. Democrat Harry H. Woodring, the incumbent Governor of Kansas, was narrowly defeated by Alf Landon, a Republican. Landon polled 34.82%, Woodring 34.14%, and John R. Brinkley, an independent, polled 30.58%.

== Results ==
Landon won 34 counties, Woodring won 31 counties, and Brinkley won 40 counties.

Kansas gubernatorial election, 1932
Party	Candidate	Votes	%	±%
Republican	Alf Landon	278,581	34.82%	–0.13
Democratic	Harry Woodring (incumbent)	272,944	34.12%	–0.83
Independent	John R. Brinkley	244,607	30.58%	+1.08
Socialist	H. M. Perkins	3,892	0.49%	–0.13
Majority		5,637	0.70%	N/A
Republican gain from Democratic		Swing		

== See also ==
- List of third party performances in United States gubernatorial elections
