= 1930 Kansas gubernatorial election =

- November 4, 1930
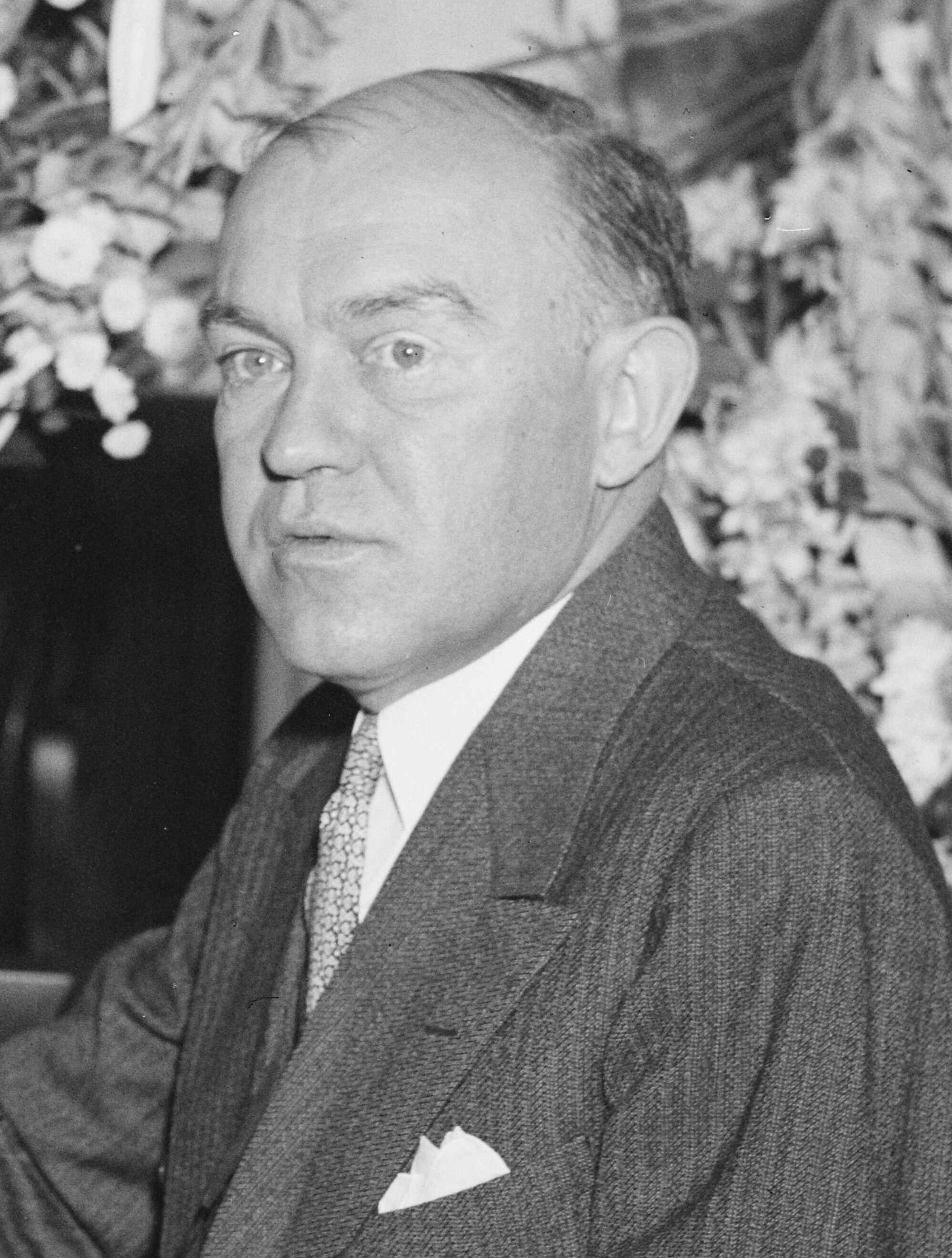

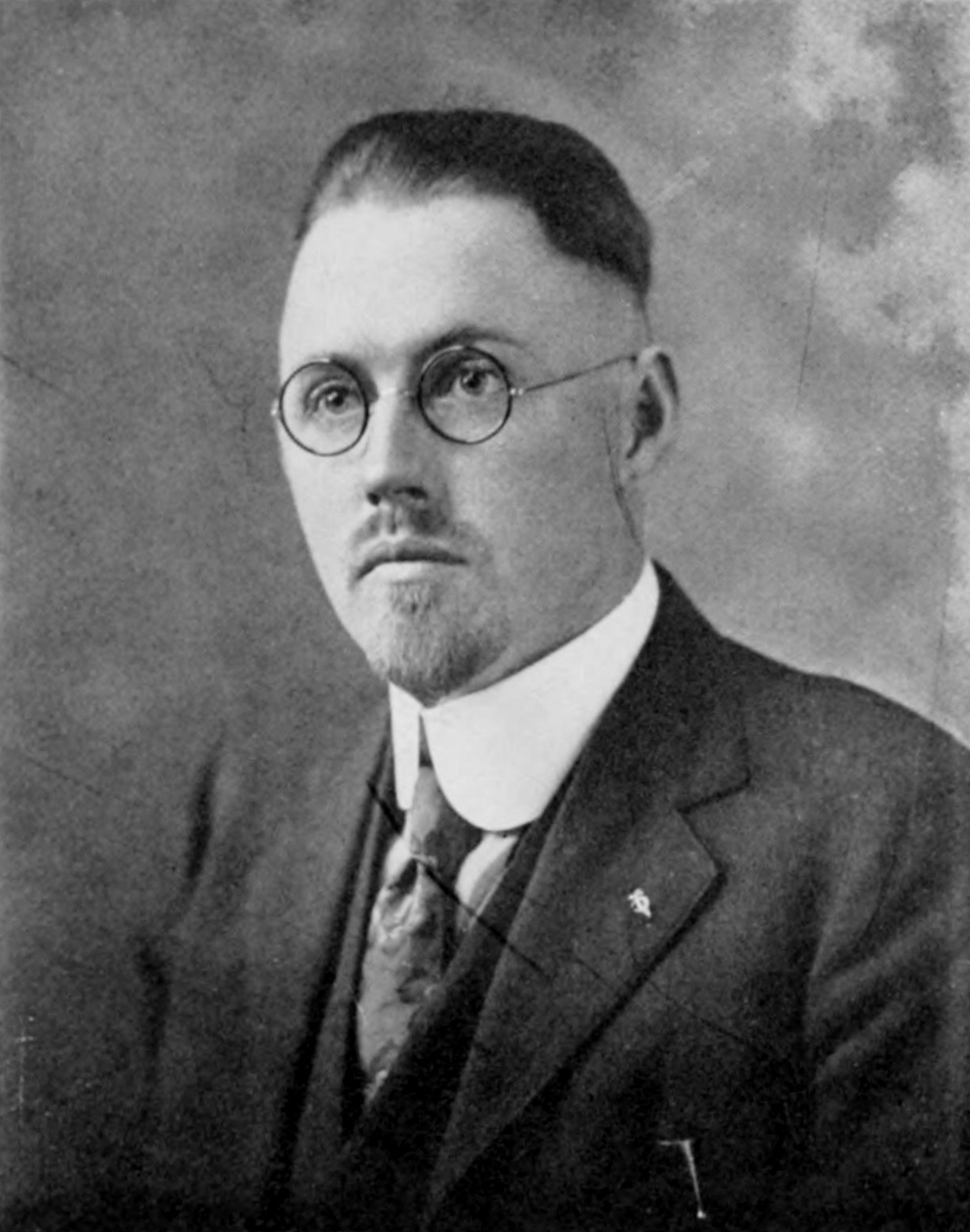
Nominee	Harry H. Woodring	Frank Haucke	John R. Brinkley (write-in)
Party	Democratic	Republican	Independent
Popular vote	217,171	216,920	183,278
Percentage	34.96%	34.92%	29.50%
- County results Woodring: 30–40% 40–50% 50–60% 60–70% Haucke: 30–40% 40–50% 50–60% Brinkley: 30–40% 40–50% 50–60%
Governor before election
Clyde M. Reed
Republican
Elected Governor
Harry H. Woodring
Democratic

The 1930 Kansas gubernatorial election took place on November 4, 1930. Harry H. Woodring was elected Governor of Kansas, becoming only the fourth member of the Democratic Party to hold the position in state history. He won with only 34.96% of the vote, with the remainder being split between Republican candidate Frank Haucke and independent write-in candidate John R. Brinkley. Woodring's final margin of victory over Haucke was just 251 votes, or 0.04 percent. The incumbent governor, Republican Clyde M. Reed, was defeated for renomination.

== Campaign and voting controversy ==
After losing his medical and broadcast licenses, "goat-gland doctor" John R. Brinkley decided to run for governor, a position that would enable him to appoint his own members to the medical board and thus regain his right to practice medicine. He began his candidacy in September 1930, just three days after he lost his medical license. He used his radio station to help his campaign, including recruiting a country music star to campaign for him. He also made use of several other publicity stunts. Brinkley campaigned on a vague program that included public works (a state lake in every county), education (free textbooks for public schoolchildren and increased educational opportunities for African Americans), lower taxes, and old-age pensions.

External image
- 1930 gubernatorial campaign advertisement, published in the Belleville Telescope. Touting Brinkley's military service during World War I and decrying the loss of his medical license, the advertisement instructs voters explicitly how to vote for the write-in candidate.

Because Brinkley announced his campaign late, he was required to run as a write-in candidate. Three days before the election, the Attorney General of Kansas, an opponent of Brinkley, announced that the rules surrounding write-in candidates had changed, and that Brinkley's name could only be written in in one specific way for the vote to count (as "J. R. Brinkley"). An article published at the time in The Des Moines Register estimated that between 30,000 and 50,000 ballots were disqualified in this manner. The successful candidate, Woodring, later admitted he would have lost had all of Brinkley's votes been counted.

== Results ==
Woodring won 39 counties (including Rawlins County by a single vote), Haucke won 38 counties, and Brinkley 28 counties.

Kansas gubernatorial election, 1930
Party	Candidate	Votes	%	±%
Democratic	Harry H. Woodring	217,171	34.96	+1.76
Republican	Frank Haucke	216,920	34.92	–30.68
Independent	John R. Brinkley (write-in)	183,278	29.50	+29.50
Socialist	J. B. Shields	3,866	0.62	–0.58
Majority		251	0.04	N/A
Democratic gain from Republican		Swing	+1.76	

== See also ==
- List of third party performances in United States gubernatorial elections
