= Chauncey B. Little =

American politician

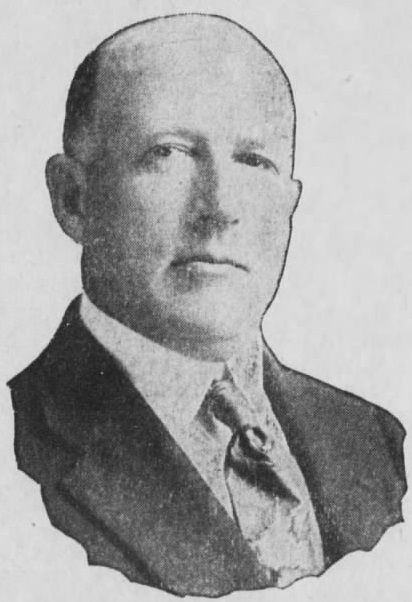

Member of the U.S. House of Representatives from Kansas's 2nd district
- In office March 4, 1925 – March 3, 1927
- Preceded by: Ulysses Samuel Guyer
- Succeeded by: Ulysses Samuel Guyer

Personal details
- Born: February 10, 1877 Olathe, Kansas, US
- Died: September 29, 1952 (aged 75) Olathe, Kansas, US
- Party: Democratic

Chauncey Bundy Little (February 10, 1877 – September 29, 1952) was a U.S. representative from Kansas.

Born in Olathe, Kansas, Little attended grade school and high school in Olathe and the Kansas State College at Manhattan. In 1898, he graduated from the law department of the University of Kansas at Lawrence. He was admitted to the bar the same year and commenced practice in Olathe. He was the city attorney of Olathe from 1901–06, and served as the county attorney of Johnson County, Kansas from 1909 to 1913.

Little was elected as a Democrat to the Sixty-ninth Congress (March 4, 1925 – March 3, 1927). He was an unsuccessful candidate for re-election in 1926 to the Seventieth Congress. He resumed the practice of law. He was an unsuccessful candidate for Governor of Kansas in 1928. He died in Olathe, Kansas on September 29, 1952, and was interred in Olathe Cemetery.

Party political offices
Preceded by Ralph T. O'Neil	Democratic nominee for Kansas Attorney General; 1922	Succeeded by Thurman Hill
Preceded by Jonathan M. Davis	Democratic nominee for Governor of Kansas; 1928	Succeeded by Harry Hines Woodring
Preceded by Howard E. Payne	Democratic nominee for Kansas Attorney General; 1934	Succeeded by Innis D. Harris
U.S. House of Representatives
Preceded by Ulysses S. Guyer	Member of the U.S. House of Representatives from Kansas's 2nd congressional district 1925–1927	Succeeded by Ulysses S. Guyer
