= Errett P. Scrivner =

American politician

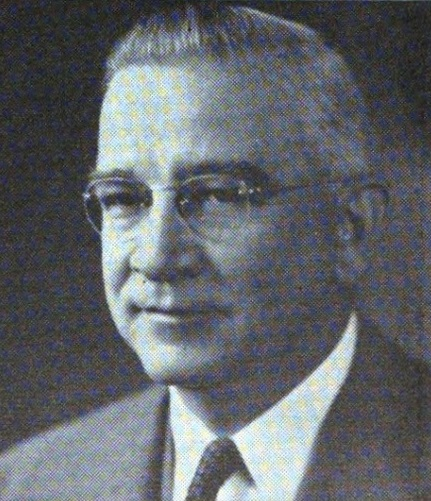

Member of the U.S. House of Representatives from Kansas's 2nd district
- In office September 14, 1943 – January 3, 1959
- Preceded by: Ulysses Samuel Guyer
- Succeeded by: Newell A. George

Personal details
- Born: March 20, 1898 Newton, Kansas, U.S.
- Died: May 5, 1978 (aged 80) Cocoa Beach, Florida, U.S.
- Party: Republican
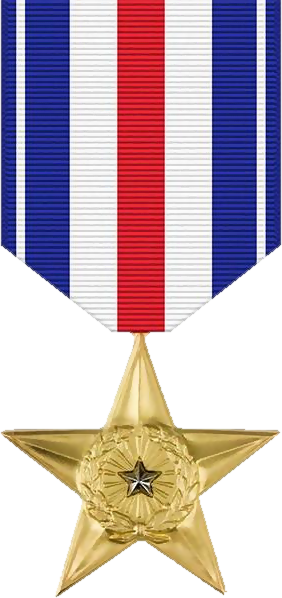
- Awards: Silver Star; Purple Heart

Military service
- Allegiance: United States of America
- Branch/service: United States Army
- Rank: First lieutenant
- Unit: Battery B, 129th Field Artillery Regiment
- Battles/wars: World War I

Errett Power Scrivner (March 20, 1898 – May 5, 1978) was a U.S. representative from Kansas.

== Biography ==
Born in Newton, Kansas, Scrivner attended grade schools and was graduated from Manual Training High School, Kansas City, Missouri. In July 1917, during World War I, he enlisted in Battery B of the One Hundred and Twenty-ninth Field Artillery; he served overseas in 1918 and 1919. He was awarded the Silver Star and Purple Heart Medals. After promotion from the rank of private first class, he left military service as a first lieutenant.

He was graduated from the law department of the University of Kansas in Lawrence, Kansas with a Bachelor of Laws degree in 1925, Phi Delta Phi and Order of the Coif. He was admitted to the bar the same year and commenced practice in Kansas City, Kansas.

Scrivner was elected as a Republican to the Seventy-eight Congress, by special election, September 14, 1943, to fill the vacancy caused by the death of U.S. Guyer. He was reelected to the seven succeeding Congresses and served from September 14, 1943 to January 3, 1959. Scrivner voted in favor of the Civil Rights Act of 1957. He was an unsuccessful candidate for reelection in 1958 to the Eighty-sixth Congress, largely due to his request for a vote for appropriations to continue construction on the controversial and wildly unpopular Tuttle Creek Dam along the Big Blue River. President Eisenhower had specifically chosen to leave out funding for the continuation of the dam, but Scrivner's insistence led to the displacement of thousands of families and the flooding of some of America's best crop land.

He served as special assistant to the comptroller, Department of Defense, Washington, D.C., from January 1959 to March 1960. He served as Deputy Assistant Secretary of Defense, Public Affairs, from March 7, 1960, to January 20, 1961. He was City commissioner in 1970 in Cocoa Beach, Florida, where he resided until his death on May 5, 1978. He was cremated and entombed in Florida. In 1984, his remains were reinterred in the niches at Arlington National Cemetery.

== Personal ==
Scrivner was the son of Rev. William H. Scrivner and his wife Etta (West) Scrivner. He married Jean Lorraine Marshall in 1921 and they had one daughter.

U.S. House of Representatives
Preceded by Ulysses S. Guyer	Member of the U.S. House of Representatives from Kansas's 2nd congressional district September 14, 1943 – January 3, 1959	Succeeded by Newell A. George
