= Oak Hill Cemetery (Lawrence, Kansas) =

Historic site in Douglas County, Kansas

- U.S. National Register of Historic Places
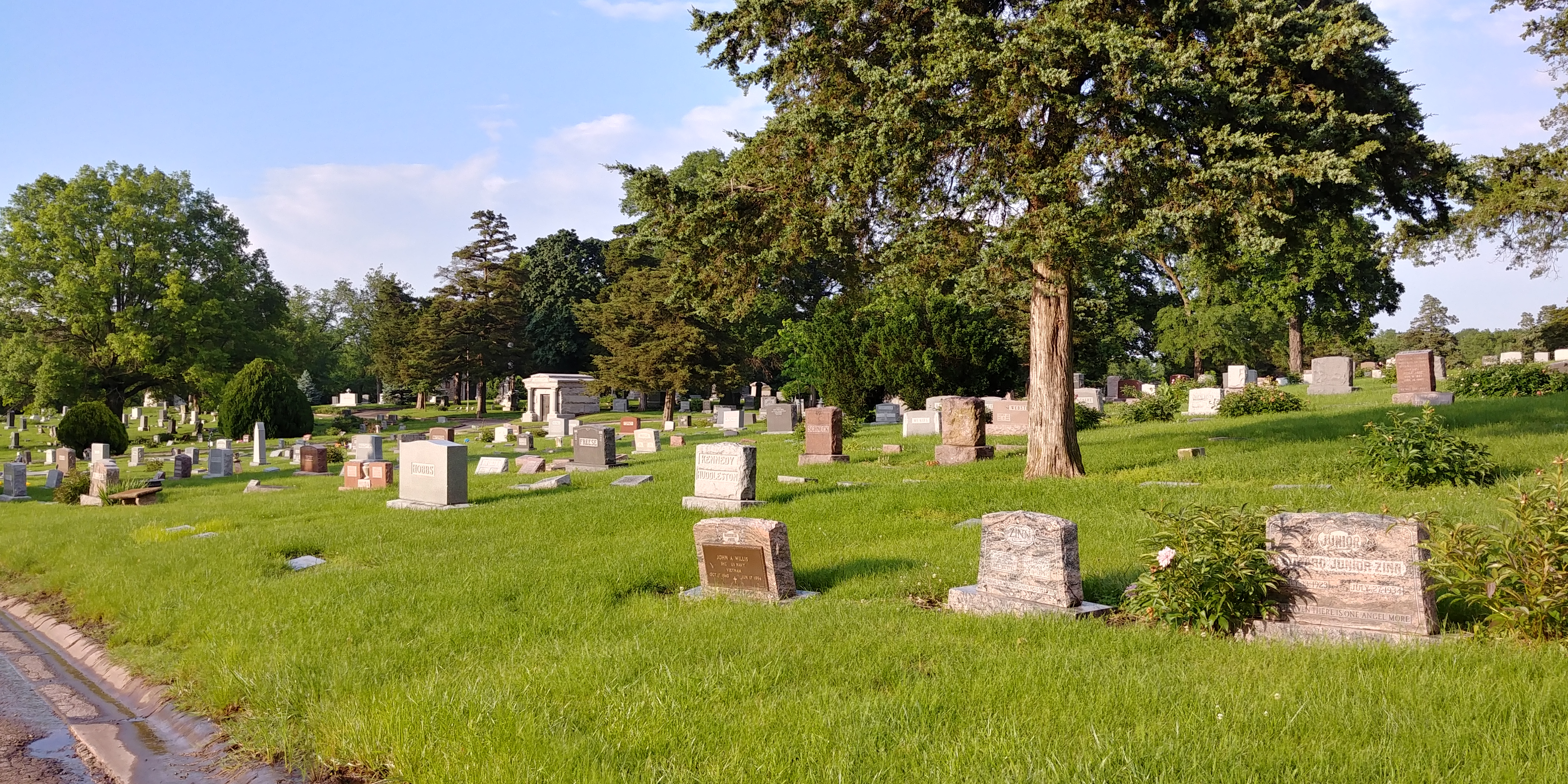

- Location within Kansas
- Location: 1605 Oak Hill Avenue, Lawrence, Kansas
- Coordinates: 38°57′31″N 95°12′44″W
- NRHP reference No.: 100001287
- Added to NRHP: July 10, 2017

The Oak Hill Cemetery is a cemetery in Lawrence, Kansas. It was first constructed as a way for the people of Lawrence to remember those who were killed in Quantrill's Raid. Several prominent Kansans are buried there, including Charles L. Robinson, John P. Usher, Lucy Hobbs Taylor, James H. Lane, and the grandparents of Langston Hughes—Charles and Mary Langston. It was started in 1866.
