= Clyde M. Reed =

American politician (1871–1949)

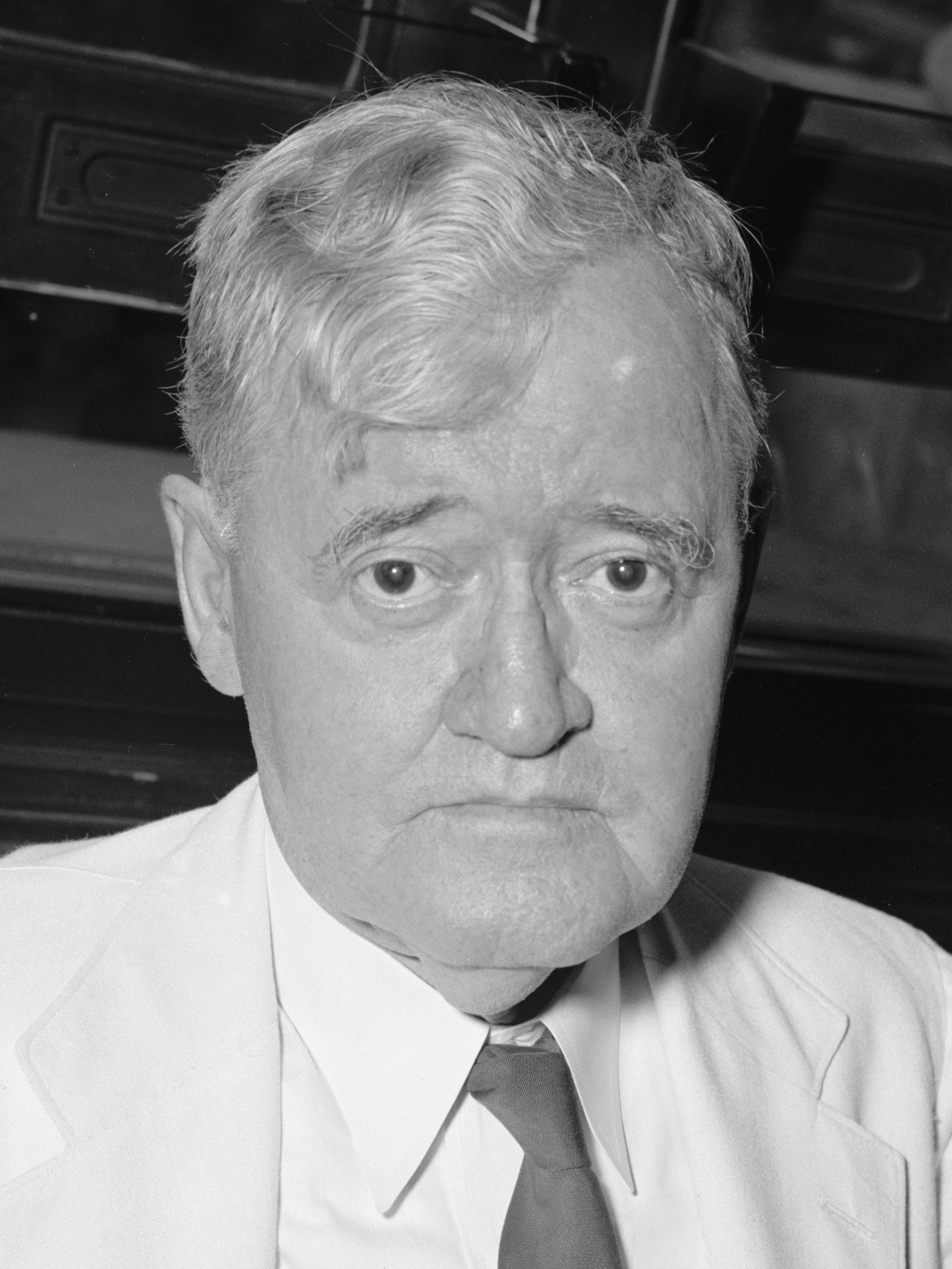
- Reed in 1940

United States Senator from Kansas
- In office January 3, 1939 – November 8, 1949
- Preceded by: George McGill
- Succeeded by: Harry Darby

24th Governor of Kansas
- In office January 14, 1929 – January 12, 1931
- Lieutenant: Jacob W. Graybill
- Preceded by: Benjamin S. Paulen
- Succeeded by: Harry H. Woodring

Personal details
- Born: October 19, 1871 Champaign County, Illinois, US
- Died: November 8, 1949 (aged 78) Parsons, Kansas, US
- Party: Republican
- Spouse: Minnie E. Hart
- Profession: teacher, postman, newspaper editor

Clyde Martin Reed (October 19, 1871 – November 8, 1949) was an American politician who served as the 24th governor of Kansas from 1929 to 1931 and as a United States senator from 1939 until his death in 1949.

== Biography ==
Born in Champaign County, Illinois, Reed moved to Kansas with his family when he was four years old. After completing a basic education, he taught school for a single year then began work as a federal employee. He served in different capacities for the next thirty years. He first worked for the railroad mail carrier service, rising to be superintendent of several areas throughout the Midwest and then to the Railway Adjustment Division, Post Office Department superintendent. He married Minnie E. Hart in 1891 and they had ten children.

== Career ==
In 1919, Reed became personal secretary to Governor Henry J. Allen in Topeka, who was also owner and publisher of the Wichita Beacon. Four years later, he purchased controlling interest in the Parsons Sun newspaper of Parsons, Kansas, and continued as publisher until his death in 1949. He served on the Kansas Industrial Court from 1920 to 1921, and was a member of the Public Utilities Commission from 1921 to 1924.

Reed was elected Governor of Kansas in 1928, after becoming known as a candidate for being extremely progressive. Shortly after he moved into the governor's mansion, the Great Depression began. Reed called an extra session of the state legislature to combat the troubles faced by Kansans dealing with the depression.

Reed was defeated in his bid for renomination in 1930, and returned to newspaper editing. When the antisemitic preacher Gerald B. Winrod ran for the Republican nomination for the United States Senate in 1938 and seemed likely to win it, Reed was recruited by the mainstream political establishment as a popular figure who could prevent Winrod's nomination. Reed won the nomination and the general election, unseating incumbent Democrat George McGill, and was re-elected in 1944, and served in that office until his death. While in the Senate, his fellow Kansas Senator was also a former governor, Arthur Capper. Reed attempted to obtain the 1942 Republican nomination for governor of Kansas but failed.

== Death ==
Reed died in 1949 while on a visit home from the Senate. He is interred at Oakwood Cemetery in Parsons.

== See also ==
- List of members of the United States Congress who died in office (1900–1949)

Party political offices
| Preceded by Benjamin S. Paulen | Republican nominee for Governor of Kansas; 1928 | Succeeded by Frank Haucke |
| Preceded by Benjamin S. Paulen | Republican nominee for U.S. Senator from Kansas (Class 3); 1938, 1944 | Succeeded by Frank Carlson |
Political offices
| Preceded by Benjamin S. Paulen | Governor of Kansas; 1929–1931 | Succeeded by Harry H. Woodring |
U.S. Senate
| Preceded by George McGill | United States Senator (Class 3) from Kansas; 1939–1949 | Succeeded by Harry Darby |
