= Charles Frederick Scott =

American politician (1860–1938)

Charles F. Scott
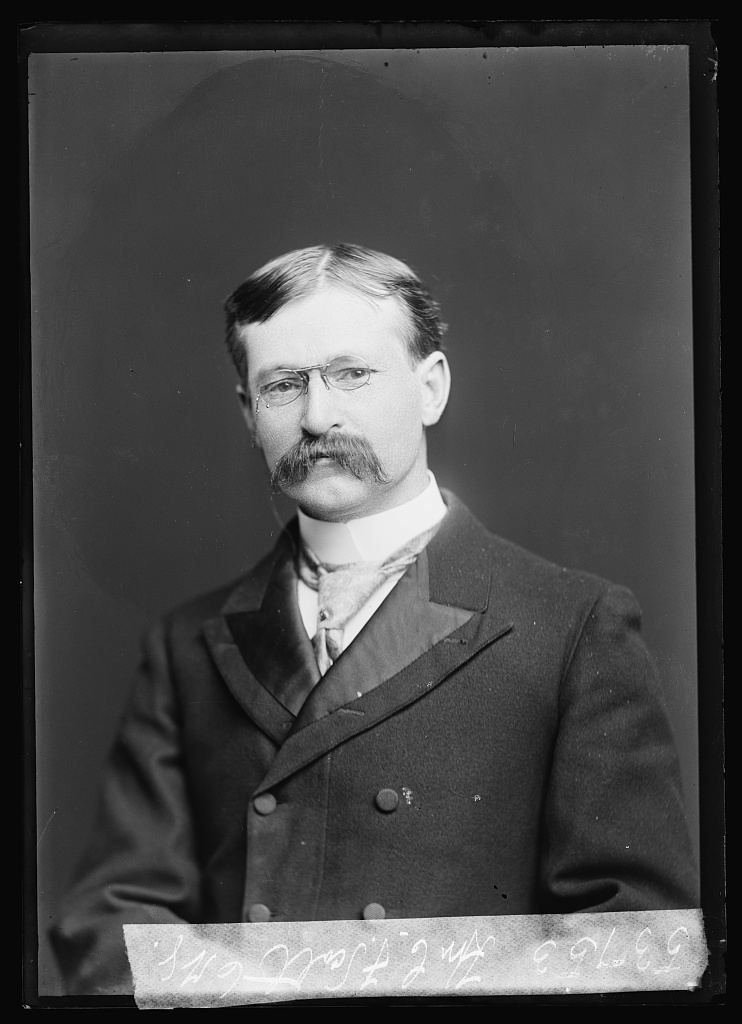
- Scott, 1903–1905

Member of the U.S. House of Representatives from Kansas
- In office March 4, 1901 – March 3, 1911
- Preceded by: Willis J. Bailey (AL); Justin D. Bowersock (2nd)
- Succeeded by: District eliminated (AL); Alexander C. Mitchell (2nd)
- Constituency: At-large district (1901-07); 2nd district (1907-11)

Member of the Kansas Senate
- In office 1892–1896

Personal details
- Born: September 7, 1860 Iola, Kansas, U.S.
- Died: September 18, 1938 (aged 78) Iola, Kansas, U.S.
- Party: Republican

Charles Frederick Scott (September 7, 1860 – September 18, 1938) was a United States House of Representatives from Kansas.

== Biography ==
Born near Iola, Kansas, Scott attended the common schools. He was graduated from the University of Kansas at Lawrence in 1881. He went to Colorado, New Mexico, and Arizona, and was engaged chiefly in clerical work. He returned to Iola in 1882 and edited the Iola Register. He was appointed regent of the university in 1891–1900. He served as member of the Kansas State Senate from 1892 to 1896, and according to the 1903 Congressional Directory, "at different times has been president of the State Editorial Association, president of the Kansas League of Republican Clubs, and president of the Kansas Day Club, an organization of the young Republicans of the State".

Scott was elected as a Republican to the 57th Congress and to the four succeeding Congresses (1901–1911). He served as chairman of the Committee on Agriculture (60th and 61st Congresses).

Scott was an unsuccessful candidate for reelection in 1910 to the 62nd Congress, losing the Republican nomination to Alexander C. Mitchell. He was appointed one of five delegates to the International Institute of Agriculture at Rome in 1911. He lectured on Chautauqua platform in 1913, 1915, and 1916. He served as delegate to the Republican National Conventions in 1916 and 1932.

Scott was an unsuccessful candidate for nomination to the United States Senate in 1918, losing the Arthur Capper. He resumed newspaper work until his death in Iola, Kansas, on September 18, 1938. He was interred in Iola Cemetery.

Scott was an elected member of the American Philosophical Society.

Political offices
Preceded by James W. Wadsworth	Chairman of the House Agriculture Committee; 1907–1911	Succeeded by John Lamb
U.S. House of Representatives
Preceded by Justin D. Bowersock	Member of the U.S. House of Representatives from Kansas's 2nd congressional district 1907–1911	Succeeded by Alexander C. Mitchell
Preceded by Willis J. Bailey	Member of the U.S. House of Representatives from Kansas's at-large congressional district 1901–1907	Succeeded by Seat eliminated
