= Harry Hines Woodring =

American politician (1887–1967)

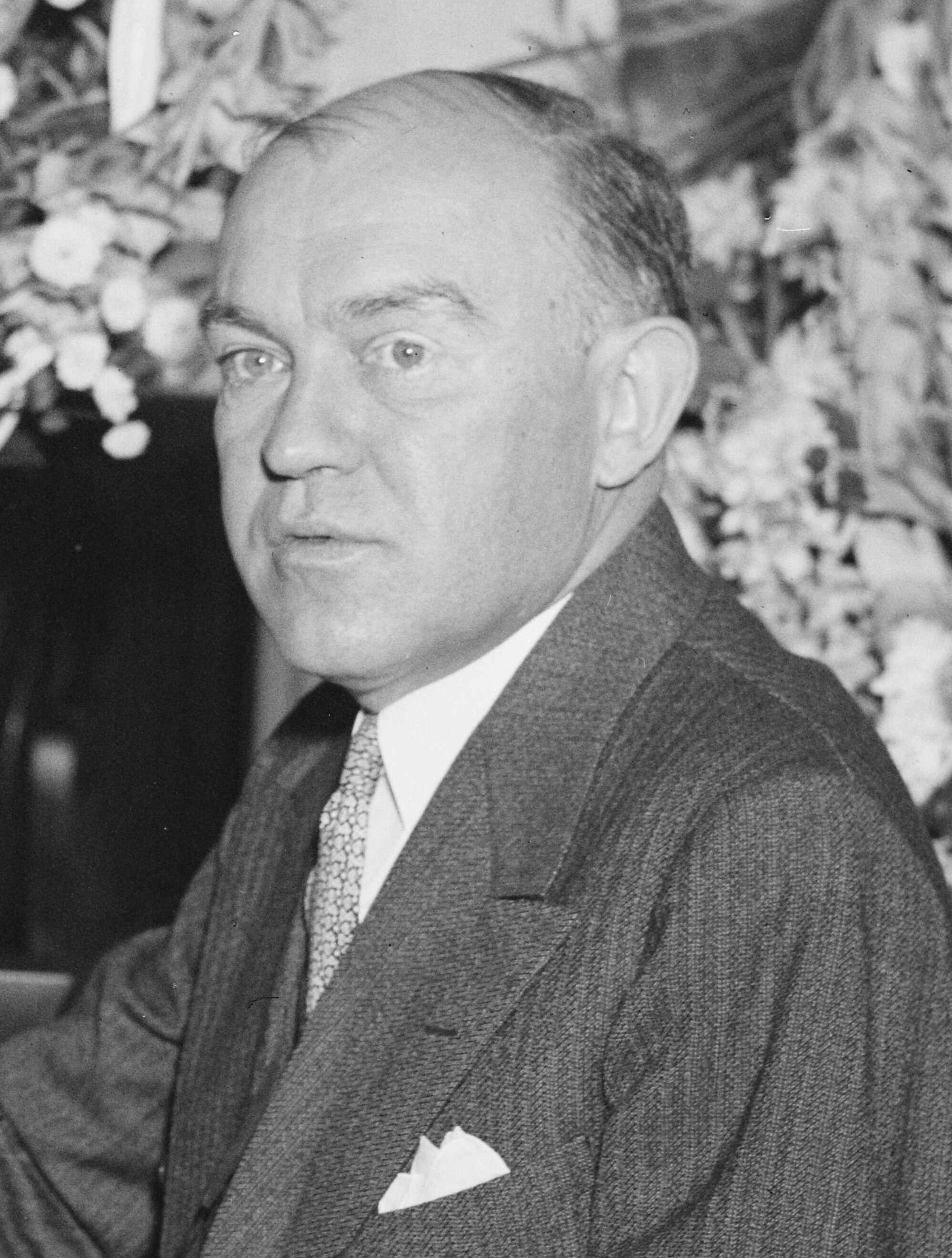
- Woodring in 1936

53rd United States Secretary of War
- In office September 25, 1936 – June 20, 1940
- President: Franklin D. Roosevelt
- Preceded by: George Dern
- Succeeded by: Henry L. Stimson

25th Governor of Kansas
- In office January 12, 1931 – January 9, 1933
- Lieutenant: Jacob W. Graybill
- Preceded by: Clyde M. Reed
- Succeeded by: Alf Landon

Personal details
- Born: Harry Hines Woodring; May 31, 1887 Elk City, Kansas, U.S.
- Died: September 9, 1967 (aged 80) Topeka, Kansas, U.S.
- Party: Democratic
- Spouse: Helen Coolidge
- Education: Lebanon Business University

Military service
- Branch: United States Army
- Rank: Second Lieutenant
- Unit: Tank Corps
- Wars: World War I
- Awards: World War I Victory Medal

Harry Hines Woodring (May 31, 1887 – September 9, 1967) was an American politician. A Democrat, he was the 25th governor of Kansas and the United States assistant secretary of war from 1933 to 1936. His most important role was Secretary of War in President Franklin Delano Roosevelt's cabinet from 1936 to 1940. After 1938, Roosevelt rejected isolationism regarding Europe; Woodring, who quietly opposed Roosevelt, was eventually removed.

== Biography ==
Harry Hines Woodring was born in 1887 in Elk City, Kansas, the son of farmer and Union Army soldier Hines Woodring. He was educated in city and county schools and at sixteen began work as a janitor. He attended Lebanon Business University in Lebanon, Indiana, for one year, which gained him employment as a bookkeeper and assistant cashier of the First National Bank in Elk City.

== Career ==
Woodring soon became assistant cashier at the First National Bank of Neodesha. Woodring moved up quickly to become vice president and owner of the bank until he enlisted as a private in the U.S. Army. He was later commissioned a second lieutenant in the Tank Corps in World War I. He was elected state commander of the American Legion Department of Kansas, then in 1928 he sold his banking business to enter politics.

=== Governor of Kansas ===
Woodring won the Kansas gubernatorial election of 1930 in a controversial three-way race with Republican Frank Haucke and write-in candidate and goat-gland transplantation specialist, John Brinkley. Brinkley won the most votes, but the state only counted ballots with J. R. Brinkley written in, disqualifying tens of thousands of ballots with variants like John Brinkley written in. Woodring himself admitted he would have lost, had all Brinkley's votes been counted. Woodring served as governor of Kansas from 1931 to 1933. As the only Democrat elected to a statehouse office, his efforts to cut expenditures were largely blocked by Republicans, so he cut his own salary and the highway department, the one place where Democrats had control.

On March 14, 1931, Woodring, an opponent of the death penalty, vetoed legislation to reinstate it in Kansas. This decision was later harshly criticized by the author of the legislation, Donald Muir, after the April 17, 1932, lynching of Pleasant Read, a white man who had kidnapped, raped, and murdered an 8-year-old girl. Read was the first person to be lynched in Kansas since 1920. Muir had previously warned Woodring that unless his legislation was approved, there was a risk that people would soon "take the law into their own hands." Quoting Woodring as saying prior to the veto, "There is certainly no crisis in Kansas which would necessitate the retrogression toward the dark ages in our criminal law," Muir said, "We now see the result." The death penalty was eventually reinstated in 1935. Pleasant Read would remain the last person to ever be lynched in Kansas.

Woodring ran for re-election in 1932, but lost to Republican Alf Landon in a three-way race, again featuring John Brinkley.

On July 25, 1933, Woodring married Helen Coolidge, with whom he had three children. Coolidge was the daughter of United States Senator Marcus A. Coolidge.

=== War Department ===
Woodring served as Assistant Secretary of War from 1933 to 1936, with supervision over procurement matters. He was promoted and served as Secretary of War in the Roosevelt cabinet from 1936 to 1940. He continued the recommendations of his predecessor for increasing the strength of the Regular Army, National Guard, and the Reserve Corps. During his tenure he directed a revision of mobilization plans to bring personnel and procurement into balance and stressed the need to perfect the initial (peacetime) protective force.

A strict non-interventionist, Woodring came under pressure from other cabinet members to resign in the first year of World War II. Secretary of the Interior Harold Ickes met with Roosevelt at least twice to call for Woodring's firing, but FDR was at first unwilling to do so, instead appointing outspoken interventionist Louis A. Johnson as Woodring's assistant secretary of war. Woodring and Johnson were immediately at odds, and quickly reached the point where they refused to speak to each other. On June 20, 1940, Roosevelt ended the struggle by finally firing Woodring, replacing him with long-time Republican politician Henry Stimson. Woodring remained isolationist, opposing the Selective Training and Service Act of 1940.

Woodring ran unsuccessfully for Governor of Kansas in 1946, and for the Democratic Party nomination for that post in 1956.

== Death ==
Woodring died following a stroke in Topeka, Kansas, on September 9, 1967, at the age of 80. He is buried at the Mount Hope Cemetery in Topeka.

== See also ==
- List of members of the American Legion

== Bibliography ==
- Goodwin, Doris Kearns (1994). No Ordinary Time. Simon & Schuster. ISBN 9780684804484.

Party political offices
Preceded by Chauncey B. Little	Democratic nominee for Governor of Kansas; 1930, 1932	Succeeded by Omar Ketchum
Preceded by Robert Lemon	Democratic nominee for Governor of Kansas; 1946	Succeeded by Randolph Carpenter
Political offices
Preceded by Clyde M. Reed	Governor of Kansas; 1931–1933	Succeeded by Alf Landon
Preceded by Frederick Huff Payne	United States Assistant Secretary of War; 1933–1936	Succeeded by Louis A. Johnson
Preceded by George Dern	United States Secretary of War; 1936–1940	Succeeded by Henry L. Stimson
